= 17th Tamil Nadu Assembly =

2026–2031 Tamil Nadu Assembly term

←	16th	18th	→

Overview
- Legislative body: Tamil Nadu Legislative Assembly
- Meeting place: Fort St. George, Chennai, India
- Term: 11 May 2026 –
- Election: 2026 Tamil Nadu Legislative Assembly election
- Government: C. Joseph Vijay ministry
- Opposition: DMK
- Website: Official website
- Members: 234
- Speaker: J. C. D. Prabhakar
- Deputy Speaker: M. Ravisankar
- Chief Minister: C. Joseph Vijay
- Leader of the Opposition: Udhayanidhi Stalin
- Party control: TVK

The 17th Assembly of Tamil Nadu succeeded the 16th Tamil Nadu Assembly and was constituted after the 2026 Tamil Nadu Legislative Assembly election, which resulted in a Hung Assembly for the second time in the state's history, with no party or alliance reaching the majority mark since the 1952 election when INC was the largest party with no majority in the 1st Madras Assembly.

== Office bearers ==
The main officials of the Tamil Nadu Legislative Assembly are:

Position	Name	Office Taken
Speaker	J. C. D. Prabhakar	12 May 2026
Deputy Speaker	M. Ravisankar	12 May 2026
Chief Minister	C. Joseph Vijay	10 May 2026
Leader of the House	K. A. Sengottaiyan	12 May 2026
Government Whip	R. Sabarinathan	12 May 2026
Leader of Opposition	Udhayanidhi Stalin	10 May 2026
Deputy Leader of Opposition	K. N. Nehru	10 May 2026

== Chief Minister ==
Chief Minister	Took office	Left office	Term
C. Joseph Vijay	10 May 2026	Incumbent	193 days

== Council of Ministers ==
Source:Government of Tamil Nadu

Sr. No.	Name	Portait	Constituency	Portfolio(s)	Party	Term of office	
Sr. No.	Name	Portait	Constituency	Portfolio(s)	Party	Took office	Duration
Chief Minister
1	C. Joseph Vijay		Perambur	Public, General Administration, Indian Administrative Service, Indian Police Service, Indian Forest Service, District Revenue Officers; Police; Home; Special Programme Implementation, Poverty Alleviation and Rural Indebtedness; Special Initiatives; Youth Welfare; Welfare of Children, Aged, and Differently Abled Persons; Municipal Administration, Urban and Water Supply	TVK	10 May 2026	193 days
Cabinet ministers
2	N. Anand		Thiyagarayanagar	Rural Development, Panchayats and Panchayat Union; Irrigation, Irrigation Projects including Small Irrigation	TVK	10 May 2026	193 days
3	Aadhav Arjuna		Villivakkam	Public Works (Buildings); Highways and Minor Ports; Sports Development	TVK	10 May 2026	193 days
4	K. G. Arunraj		Tiruchengode	Health, Medical Education and Family Welfare	TVK	10 May 2026	193 days
5	K. A. Sengottaiyan		Gobichettipalayam	Revenue, District Revenue Establishment, Deputy Collectors, Disaster Management, Boodhan, Gramadhan; Legislative Assembly	TVK	10 May 2026	193 days
6	P. Venkataramanan		Mylapore	Food and Civil Supplies, Consumer Protection and Price Control	TVK	10 May 2026	193 days
7	C. T. R. Nirmal Kumar		Thiruparankundram	Electricity & Non-Conventional Energy Development; Law, Courts, Prisons, Prevention of Corruption; Governor; Elections and Passports	TVK	10 May 2026	193 days
8	Rajmohan Arumugam		Egmore	School Education; Archaeology; Tamil Official Language and Tamil Culture, Information & Publicity, Film Technology and Cinematograph Act, Newsprint Control, Stationery and Printing, Government Press	TVK	10 May 2026	193 days
9	T. K. Prabhu		Karaikudi	Minerals and Mines	TVK	10 May 2026	193 days
10	S. Keerthana		Sivakasi	Industries, Investment Promotion	TVK	10 May 2026	193 days
11	P. Viswanathan		Melur	Higher Education including Technical Education, Electronics, Science and Technology	INC	21 May 2026	182 days
12	S. Rajeshkumar		Killiyoor	Tourism and Tourism Development Corporation	INC	21 May 2026	182 days
13	A. M. Shahjahan		Papanasam	Minorities Welfare and Wakf Board	IUML	22 May 2026	181 days
14	Vanni Arasu		Tindivanam	Adi Dravidar Welfare and Hill Tribes	VCK	22 May 2026	181 days
15	Vijay Tamilan Parthiban		Salem South	Motor Vehicle Acts – Administration, Transport, Nationalised Transport and Motor Vehicles Act	TVK	21 May 2026	182 days
16	B. Rajkumar		Cuddalore	Housing, Rural Housing, Town Planning Projects and Housing Development, Accommodation Control, Tamil Nadu Urban Habitat Development Board, Urban Planning and Urban Development; CMDA	TVK	21 May 2026	182 days
17	V. Sampath Kumar		Coimbatore North	Backward Classes Welfare, Most Backward Classes Welfare and De-notified Communities Welfare	TVK	21 May 2026	182 days
18	M. Vijay Balaji		Erode East	Handlooms and Textiles, Khadi and Village Industries Board	TVK	21 May 2026	182 days
19	K. Vignesh		Kinathukadavu	Prohibition and Excise	TVK	21 May 2026	182 days
20	Thennarasu. K.		Sriperumbudur	Non-Resident Tamils Welfare, Refugees & evacuees	TVK	21 May 2026	182 days
21	J. Mohamed Farvas		Arantangi	Labour Welfare, Population, Employment and Training, Urban and Rural Employment and Bonded Labour Welfare; Census	TVK	21 May 2026	182 days
22	V. Gandhiraj		Arakkonam	Co-operation	TVK	21 May 2026	182 days
23	Jegadeshwari. K.		Rajapalayam	Social Welfare including Women Welfare; Orphanages and Correctional Administration and Beggar Homes and Social Reforms & Nutritious Meal Programme	TVK	21 May 2026	182 days
24	R. Vinoth		Kumbakonam	Agriculture, Agricultural Engineering, Agro Service Co-operatives, Horticulture, Sugar, Sugarcane Excise, Sugarcane Development and Waste Land Development	TVK	21 May 2026	182 days
25	C. Vijayalakshmi		Kumarapalayam	Milk and Dairy Development	TVK	21 May 2026	182 days
26	D. Sarathkumar		Tambaram	Human Resources Management & Ex-Servicemen Welfare	TVK	21 May 2026	182 days
27	S. Ramesh		Srirangam	Hindu Religious and Charitable Endowments	TVK	21 May 2026	182 days
28	P. Mathanraja		Ottapidaram	Rural Industries including Cottage Industries, Small Industries	TVK	21 May 2026	182 days
29	N. Marie Wilson		R. K. Nagar	Finance, Pensions and Pensionary Benefits; Planning & Development	TVK	21 May 2026	182 days
30	Srinath		Thoothukkudi	Fisheries, Fisheries Development Corporation	TVK	21 May 2026	182 days
31	S. Kamali		Avanashi	Animal Husbandry	TVK	21 May 2026	182 days
32	R. Kumar		Velachery	Artificial Intelligence, Information Technology and Digital Services	TVK	21 May 2026	182 days
33	R. V. Ranjithkumar		Kancheepuram	Forests	TVK	21 May 2026	182 days
34	Logesh Tamilselvan		Rasipuram	Commercial Taxes, Registration and Stamp Act, Debt Relief including legislation on Money lending, Chits and Registration of Companies	TVK	21 May 2026	182 days
35	Rajeev		Tiruvadanai	Environment, Pollution Control Board, Climate Change	TVK	21 May 2026	182 days

== Party position ==
Number of members of legislative assembly by party-wise and their floor leaders (As on 19 November 2026):

Alliance	Political party	No. of MLAs	Floor leader of the party
Government; SSJVA; Seats: 118	Tamilaga Vettri Kazhagam	108	C. Joseph Vijay (Chief Minister)
Government; SSJVA; Seats: 118	Indian National Congress	5	Tharahai Cuthbert
Government; SSJVA; Seats: 118	Indian Union Muslim League	2	A. M. Shahjahan
Government; SSJVA; Seats: 118	Viduthalai Chiruthaigal Katchi	2	Vanni Arasu
Outside Support/ Confidence and Supply; LF and one other Seats: 5	Communist Party of India	2	T. Ramachandran
Outside Support/ Confidence and Supply; LF and one other Seats: 5	Communist Party of India (Marxist)	2	R. Chellaswamy
Outside Support/ Confidence and Supply; LF and one other Seats: 5	Independent	1	S. Kamaraj
Opposition; SPA; Seats: 60	Dravida Munnetra Kazhagam	59	Udhayanidhi Stalin (Leader of the Opposition)
Opposition; SPA; Seats: 60	Desiya Murpokku Dravida Kazhagam	1	Premallatha Vijayakant
Others AIADMK+ Seats: 46	All India Anna Dravida Munnetra Kazhagam	41	Edappadi K. Palaniswami
Others AIADMK+ Seats: 46	Pattali Makkal Katchi	4	Sowmiya Anbumani
Others AIADMK+ Seats: 46	Bharatiya Janata Party	1	M. Bhojarajan
Vacant; Seats: 6	Perundurai; Karur; Tiruchirappalli (East); Viralimalai; Ambasamudram; Kolathur	6	N/A
Total		234	

== Members ==
District	No.	Constituency	Name	Party	Alliance	Remarks
Tiruvallur	1	Gummidipoondi	S. Vijayakumar	TVK	SSJVA	
Tiruvallur	2	Ponneri	M. S. Ravi	TVK	SSJVA	
Tiruvallur	3	Tiruttani	G. Hari	AIADMK	NDA	Supported TVK; Later declared support for EPS
Tiruvallur	4	Thiruvallur	T. Arunkumar	TVK	SSJVA	
Tiruvallur	5	Poonamallee (SC)	R. Prakasam	TVK	SSJVA	
Tiruvallur	6	Avadi	R. Ramesh Kumar	TVK	SSJVA	
Chennai	7	Maduravoyal	P. Rhevanth Charan	TVK	SSJVA	
Chennai	8	Ambattur	G. Balamurugan	TVK	SSJVA	
Chennai	9	Madavaram	M. L. Vijayprabhu	TVK	SSJVA	
Chennai	10	Thiruvottiyur	N. Senthil Kumar	TVK	SSJVA	
Chennai	11	Dr. Radhakrishnan Nagar	N. Marie Wilson	TVK	SSJVA	Cabinet Minister
Chennai	12	Perambur	C. Joseph Vijay	TVK	SSJVA	Chief Minister
Chennai	13	Kolathur	V. S. Babu	TVK	SSJVA	
Chennai	14	Villivakkam	Aadhav Arjuna	TVK	SSJVA	Cabinet Minister
Chennai	15	Thiru-Vi-Ka-Nagar (SC)	M. R. Pallavi	TVK	SSJVA	
Chennai	16	Egmore (SC)	A. Rajmohan	TVK	SSJVA	Cabinet Minister
Chennai	17	Royapuram	K. V. Vijay Damu	TVK	SSJVA	
Chennai	18	Harbour	P. K. Sekar Babu	DMK	SPA	
Chennai	19	Chepauk-Thiruvallikeni	Udhayanidhi Stalin	DMK	SPA	Leader of the Opposition
Chennai	20	Thousand Lights	J. C. D. Prabhakar	TVK	SSJVA	Speaker
Chennai	21	Anna Nagar	V. K. Ramkumar	TVK	SSJVA	
Chennai	22	Virugampakkam	R. Sabarinathan	TVK	SSJVA	Government Whip
Chennai	23	Saidapet	M. Arul Prakasam	TVK	SSJVA	
Chennai	24	Thiyagarayanagar	Bussy N. Anand	TVK	SSJVA	Cabinet Minister
Chennai	25	Mylapore	P. Venkataramanan	TVK	SSJVA	Cabinet Minister
Chennai	26	Velachery	R. Kumar	TVK	SSJVA	Cabinet Minister
Chennai	27	Sholinganallur	P. Saravanan	TVK	SSJVA	
Chennai	28	Alandur	M. Harish	TVK	SSJVA	
Kanchipuram	29	Sriperumbudur (SC)	Thennarasu. K.	TVK	SSJVA	Cabinet Minister
Chengalpattu	30	Pallavaram	J. Kamatchi	TVK	SSJVA	
Chengalpattu	31	Tambaram	D. Sarathkumar	TVK	SSJVA	Cabinet Minister
Chengalpattu	32	Chengalpattu	S. Thiyagarajan	TVK	SSJVA	
Chengalpattu	33	Thiruporur	B. Vijayaraj	TVK	SSJVA	
Chengalpattu	34	Cheyyur (SC)	E. Rajasekar	AIADMK	NDA	Opposed TVK
Chengalpattu	35	Madurantakam (SC)	Maragatham Kumaravel	AIADMK	NDA	Supported TVK, On 25 May 2026, resigned from office and officially joined TVK
Chengalpattu	35	Madurantakam (SC)	Maragatham Kumaravel	TVK	SSJVA	Elected on 9 October 2026 by election
Kanchipuram	36	Uthiramerur	J. Munirathinam	TVK	SSJVA	
Kanchipuram	37	Kancheepuram	R. V. Ranjithkumar	TVK	SSJVA	Cabinet Minister
Ranipet	38	Arakkonam (SC)	V. Gandhiraj	TVK	SSJVA	Cabinet Minister
Ranipet	39	Sholinghur	G. Kapil	TVK	SSJVA	
Vellore	40	Katpadi	M. Sudhakar	TVK	SSJVA	
Ranipet	41	Ranipet	I. Thahira	TVK	SSJVA	
Ranipet	42	Arcot	S. M. Sukumar	AIADMK	NDA	Supported TVK; Later declared support for EPS
Vellore	43	Vellore	M. M. Vinoth Kannan	TVK	TVK+	
Vellore	44	Anaicut	D. Velazhagan	AIADMK	NDA	Opposed TVK
Vellore	45	Kilvaithinankuppam (SC)	E. Thenral Kumar	TVK	TVK+	
Vellore	46	Gudiyatham (SC)	K. Sindhu	TVK	TVK+	
Tirupathur	47	Vaniyambadi	Syed Farooq Basha	IUML	TVK+	Won as SPA candidate, switched to TVK+ post-election
Tirupathur	48	Ambur	A. C. Vilwanathan	DMK	SPA	
Tirupathur	49	Jolarpet	K. C. Veeramani	AIADMK	NDA	Supported TVK; Later declared support for EPS
Tirupathur	50	Tirupattur	N. Thirupathi	TVK	TVK+	
Krishnagiri	51	Uthangarai (SC)	N. Elaiyaraja	TVK	TVK+	
Krishnagiri	52	Bargur	E. C. Govindarasan	AIADMK	NDA	Opposed TVK
Krishnagiri	53	Krishnagiri	P. Mukundhan	TVK	TVK+	
Krishnagiri	54	Veppanahalli	P. S. Srinivasan	DMK	SPA	
Krishnagiri	55	Hosur	P. Balakrishna Reddy	AIADMK	NDA	Supported TVK; Later declared support for EPS
Krishnagiri	56	Thalli	T. Ramachandran	CPI	LDF	Won as SPA candidate; party switched to TVK+ post-election; Outside support to TVK government
Dharmapuri	57	Palacode	K. P. Anbalagan	AIADMK	NDA	Supported TVK; Later declared support for EPS
Dharmapuri	58	Pennagaram	S. Gajendran	TVK	TVK+	
Dharmapuri	59	Dharmapuri	Sowmiya Anbumani	PMK	NDA	
Dharmapuri	60	Pappireddipatti	Maragatham Vetrivel	AIADMK	NDA	Supported TVK; Later declared support for EPS
Dharmapuri	61	Harur (SC)	V. Sampathkumar	AIADMK	NDA	Opposed TVK
Tiruvannamalai	62	Chengam (SC)	T. S. Velu	AIADMK	NDA	Opposed TVK
Tiruvannamalai	63	Tiruvannamalai	E. V. Velu	DMK	SPA	
Tiruvannamalai	64	Kilpennathur	S. Ramachandran	AIADMK	NDA	Opposed TVK
Tiruvannamalai	65	Kalasapakkam	Agri S. S. Krishnamurthy	AIADMK	NDA	Opposed TVK
Tiruvannamalai	66	Polur	R. Abhishek	TVK	TVK+	
Tiruvannamalai	67	Arani	L. Jaya Sudha	AIADMK	NDA	Opposed TVK
Tiruvannamalai	68	Cheyyar	Mukkur N. Subramanian	AIADMK	NDA	Opposed TVK
Tiruvannamalai	69	Vandavasi (SC)	S. Ambethkumar	DMK	SPA	
Viluppuram	70	Gingee	A. Ganeshkumar	PMK	NDA	
Viluppuram	71	Mailam	C. Ve. Shanmugam	AIADMK	NDA	Supported TVK; Later declared support for EPS
Viluppuram	72	Tindivanam (SC)	Vanni Arasu	VCK	TVK+	Won as SPA candidate; party switched to TVK+ post-election; Cabinet Minister
Viluppuram	73	Vanur (SC)	D. Gowtham	DMK	SPA	
Viluppuram	74	Villupuram	R. Lakshmanan	DMK	SPA	
Viluppuram	75	Vikravandi	C. Sivakumar	PMK	NDA	
Viluppuram	76	Tirukkoyilur	S. Palaniswamy	AIADMK	NDA	Opposed TVK
Kallakurichi	77	Ulundurpet	G. R. Vasanthavel	DMK	SPA	
Kallakurichi	78	Rishivandiyam	K. Karthikeyan	DMK	SPA	
Kallakurichi	79	Sankarapuram	R. Rakesh	AIADMK	NDA	Supported TVK; Later declared support for EPS
Kallakurichi	80	Kallakurichi (SC)	Arul Vignesh	TVK	TVK+	
Salem	81	Gangavalli (SC)	A. Nallathambi	AIADMK	NDA	Opposed TVK
Salem	82	Attur (SC)	A. P. Jayasankaran	AIADMK	NDA	Opposed TVK
Salem	83	Yercaud (ST)	P. Usharani	AIADMK	NDA	Opposed TVK
Salem	84	Omalur	R. Mani	AIADMK	NDA	Opposed TVK
Salem	85	Mettur	G. Venkatachalam	AIADMK	NDA	Opposed TVK
Salem	86	Edappadi	Edappadi K. Palaniswami	AIADMK	NDA	Opposed TVK
Salem	87	Sankari	S. Vetrivel	AIADMK	NDA	Opposed TVK
Salem	88	Salem West	S. Lakshmanan	TVK	TVK+	
Salem	89	Salem North	K. Sivakumar	TVK	TVK+	
Salem	90	Salem South	Vijay Tamilan Parthiban	TVK	TVK+	Cabinet Minister
Salem	91	Veerapandi	M. S. Palanivel	TVK	TVK+	
Namakkal	92	Rasipuram (SC)	Logesh Tamilselvan	TVK	TVK+	Cabinet Minister
Namakkal	93	Senthamangalam (ST)	P. Chandrasekar	TVK	TVK+	
Namakkal	94	Namakkal	C. S. Dileep	TVK	TVK+	
Namakkal	95	Paramathi-Velur	S. Sekar	AIADMK	NDA	Supported TVK; Later declared support for EPS
Namakkal	96	Tiruchengode	K. G. Arunraj	TVK	TVK+	Cabinet Minister
Namakkal	97	Kumarapalayam	C. Vijayalakshmi	TVK	TVK+	Cabinet Minister
Erode	98	Erode East	M. Vijay Balaji	TVK	TVK+	Cabinet Minister
Erode	99	Erode West	K. K. Anand Mohan	TVK	TVK+	
Erode	100	Modakkurichi	D. Shanmugan	TVK	TVK+	
Tiruppur	101	Dharapuram (SC)	P. Sathyabama	AIADMK	NDA	Supported TVK
Tiruppur	101	Dharapuram (SC)	P. Sathyabama	TVK	TVK+	On 25 May 2026, resigned from office and officially joined TVK
Tiruppur	102	Kangayam	N. S. N. Nataraj	AIADMK	NDA	Supported TVK; Later declared support for EPS
Erode	103	Perundurai	S. Jayakumar	AIADMK	NDA	Supported TVK
Erode	103	Perundurai	Vacant			On 25 May 2026, resigned from office and officially joined TVK
Erode	104	Bhavani	K. C. Karuppannan	AIADMK	NDA	Opposed TVK
Erode	105	Anthiyur	P. Haribaskar	AIADMK	NDA	Supported TVK; Later declared support for EPS
Erode	106	Gobichettipalayam	K. A. Sengottaiyan	TVK	TVK+	Cabinet Minister
Erode	107	Bhavanisagar (SC)	V. P. Tamilselvi	TVK	TVK+	
Nilgiris	108	Udhagamandalam	M. Bhojarajan	BJP	NDA	
Nilgiris	109	Gudalur (SC)	M. Dravidamani	DMK	SPA	
Nilgiris	110	Coonoor	M. Raju	DMK	SPA	
Coimbatore	111	Mettuppalayam	N. Sunil Anand	TVK	TVK+	
Tiruppur	112	Avanashi (SC)	S. Kamali	TVK	TVK+	Cabinet Minister
Tiruppur	113	Tiruppur North	V. Sathyabama	TVK	TVK+	
Tiruppur	114	Tiruppur South	S. Balamurugan	TVK	TVK+	
Tiruppur	115	Palladam	K. Ramkumar	TVK	TVK+	
Coimbatore	116	Sulur	N. M. Sukumar	TVK	TVK+	
Coimbatore	117	Kavundampalayam	Kanimozhi Santhosh	TVK	TVK+	
Coimbatore	118	Coimbatore North	V. Sampathkumar	TVK	TVK+	Cabinet Minister
Coimbatore	119	Thondamuthur	S. P. Velumani	AIADMK	NDA	Supported TVK; Later declared support for EPS
Coimbatore	120	Coimbatore South	V. Senthilbalaji	DMK	SPA	
Coimbatore	121	Singanallur	K. S. Sri Giri Prasath	TVK	TVK+	
Coimbatore	122	Kinathukadavu	K. Vignesh	TVK	TVK+	Cabinet Minister
Coimbatore	123	Pollachi	K. Nithyanandhan	DMK	SPA	
Coimbatore	124	Valparai (SC)	A. Sudhakar	DMK	SPA	
Tiruppur	125	Udumalaipettai	M. Jayakumar	DMK	SPA	
Tiruppur	126	Madathukulam	R. Jayaramakrishnan	DMK	SPA	
Dindigul	127	Palani	K. Ravimanoharan	AIADMK	NDA	Supported TVK; Later declared support for EPS
Dindigul	128	Oddanchatram	R. Sakkarapani	DMK	SPA	
Dindigul	129	Athoor	I. Periyasamy	DMK	SPA	
Dindigul	130	Nilakkottai (SC)	R. Ayyanar	TVK	TVK+	
Dindigul	131	Natham	Natham R. Viswanathan	AIADMK	NDA	Supported TVK; Later declared support for EPS
Dindigul	132	Dindigul	I. P. Senthilkumar	DMK	SPA	
Dindigul	133	Vedasandur	T. Saminathan	DMK	SPA	
Karur	134	Aravakurichi	R. Elango	DMK	SPA	
Karur	135	Karur	M. R. Vijayabhaskar	AIADMK	NDA	Supported TVK
Karur	135	Karur	Vacant			On 29 June 2026, resigned from office
Karur	136	Krishnarayapuram (SC)	Sathya M.	TVK	TVK+	
Karur	137	Kulithalai	Suriyanur A. Chandran	DMK	SPA	
Tiruchirappalli	138	Manapparai	R. Kathiravan	TVK	TVK+	
Tiruchirappalli	139	Srirangam	S. Ramesh	TVK	TVK+	Cabinet Minister
Tiruchirappalli	140	Tiruchirappalli West	K. N. Nehru	DMK	SPA	Deputy Leader of the Opposition
Tiruchirappalli	141	Tiruchirappalli East	C. Joseph Vijay	TVK	TVK+	
Tiruchirappalli	141	Tiruchirappalli East	Vacant			On 10 May 2026, resigned from office and retained the Perambur Assembly constituency
Tiruchirappalli	142	Thiruverumbur	Navalpattu S. Viji	TVK	TVK+	
Tiruchirappalli	143	Lalgudi	Leema Rose Martin	AIADMK	NDA	Supported TVK; Later declared support for EPS
Tiruchirappalli	144	Manachanallur	S. Kathiravan	DMK	SPA	
Tiruchirappalli	145	Musiri	M. Vignesh	TVK	TVK+	
Tiruchirappalli	146	Thuraiyur (SC)	M. Ravisankar	TVK	TVK+	Deputy Speaker
Perambalur	147	Perambalur (SC)	K. Sivakumar	TVK	TVK+	
Perambalur	148	Kunnam	S. S. Sivasankar	DMK	SPA	
Ariyalur	149	Ariyalur	S. Rajendran	AIADMK	NDA	Opposed TVK
Ariyalur	150	Jayankondam	G. Vaithilingam	PMK	NDA	
Cuddalore	151	Tittakudi (SC)	C. V. Ganesan	DMK	SPA	
Cuddalore	152	Vriddhachalam	Premallatha Vijayakant	DMDK	SPA	
Cuddalore	153	Neyveli	R. Rajendran	AIADMK	NDA	Opposed TVK
Cuddalore	154	Panruti	K. Mohan	AIADMK	NDA	Supported TVK; Later declared support for EPS
Cuddalore	155	Cuddalore	B. Rajkumar	TVK	TVK+	Cabinet Minister
Cuddalore	156	Kurinjipadi	M. R. K. Panneerselvam	DMK	SPA	
Cuddalore	157	Bhuvanagiri	A. Arunmozhithevan	AIADMK	NDA	Supported TVK; Later declared support for EPS
Cuddalore	158	Chidambaram	M. Thamimum Ansari	DMK	SPA	
Cuddalore	159	Kattumannarkoil (SC)	L. E. Jothimani	VCK	TVK+	Won as SPA candidate; party switched to TVK+ post-election
Mayiladuthurai	160	Sirkazhi (SC)	R. Senthilselvan	DMK	SPA	
Mayiladuthurai	161	Mayiladuthurai	Jamal Mohamed Younoos	INC	TVK+	Won as SPA candidate; party switched to TVK+ post-election
Mayiladuthurai	162	Poompuhar	Nivedha M. Murugan	DMK	SPA	
Nagapattinam	163	Nagapattinam	M. H. Jawahirullah	DMK	SPA	
Nagapattinam	164	Kilvelur (SC)	T. Latha	CPI(M)	LDF	Won as SPA candidate; party switched to TVK+ post-election; outside support to TVK government
Nagapattinam	165	Vedaranyam	O. S. Manian	AIADMK	NDA	Opposed TVK
Tiruvarur	166	Thiruthuraipoondi (SC)	K. Marimuthu	CPI	LDF	Won as SPA candidate; party switched to TVK+ post-election; outside support to TVK government
Tiruvarur	167	Mannargudi	S. Kamaraj	AMMK	NDA	
Tiruvarur	167	Mannargudi	S. Kamaraj	IND	TVK+	Outside support to TVK government; Expelled from AMMK
Tiruvarur	168	Thiruvarur	K. Poondi Kalaivanan	DMK	SPA	
Tiruvarur	169	Nannilam	R. Kamaraj	AIADMK	NDA	Supported TVK; Later declared support for EPS
Thanjavur	170	Thiruvidaimarudur	Govi. Chezhian	DMK	SPA	
Thanjavur	171	Kumbakonam	R. Vinoth	TVK	TVK+	Cabinet Minister
Thanjavur	172	Papanasam	A. M. Shahjahan	IUML	TVK+	Won as SPA candidate; party switched to TVK+ post-election; Cabinet Minister
Thanjavur	173	Thiruvaiyaru	Durai Chandrasekaran	DMK	SPA	
Thanjavur	174	Thanjavur	R. Vijaysaravanan	TVK	TVK+	
Thanjavur	175	Orathanadu	R. Vaithilingam	DMK	SPA	
Thanjavur	176	Pattukkottai	K. Annadurai	DMK	SPA	
Thanjavur	177	Peravurani	N. Ashokkumar	DMK	SPA	
Pudukkottai	178	Gandarvakkottai (SC)	N. Subramanian	TVK	TVK+	
Pudukkottai	179	Viralimalai	C. Vijayabaskar	AIADMK	NDA	Supported TVK
Pudukkottai	179	Viralimalai	Vacant			On 16 June 2026, resigned from office
Pudukkottai	180	Pudukkottai	V. Muthuraja	DMK	SPA	
Pudukkottai	181	Thirumayam	S. Regupathy	DMK	SPA	
Pudukkottai	182	Alangudi	Siva V. Meyyanathan	DMK	SPA	
Pudukkottai	183	Aranthangi	J. Mohamed Farvas	TVK	TVK+	Cabinet Minister
Sivaganga	184	Karaikudi	T. K. Prabhu	TVK	TVK+	Cabinet Minister
Sivaganga	185	Tirupattur	Srinivasa Sethupathi	TVK	TVK+	
Sivaganga	186	Sivaganga	Kulanthai Rani	TVK	TVK+	
Sivaganga	187	Manamadurai (SC)	D. Elangovan	TVK	TVK+	
Madurai	188	Melur	P. Viswanathan	INC	TVK+	Won as SPA candidate; party switched to TVK+ post-election; Cabinet Minister
Madurai	189	Madurai East	S. Karthikeyan	TVK	TVK+	
Madurai	190	Sholavandan (SC)	M. V. Karuppiah	TVK	TVK+	
Madurai	191	Madurai North	A. Kallanai	TVK	TVK+	
Madurai	192	Madurai South	M. M. Gopison	TVK	TVK+	
Madurai	193	Madurai Central	Madhar Badhurudeen	TVK	TVK+	
Madurai	194	Madurai West	S. R. Thangapandi	TVK	TVK+	
Madurai	195	Thiruparankundram	C. T. R. Nirmal Kumar	TVK	TVK+	Cabinet Minister
Madurai	196	Thirumangalam	Sedapatti M. Manimaran	DMK	SPA	
Madurai	197	Usilampatti	M. Vijay	TVK	TVK+	
Theni	198	Andipatti	A. Maharajan	DMK	SPA	
Theni	199	Periyakulam (SC)	G. Sabari Iyngaran	TVK	TVK+	
Theni	200	Bodinayakanur	O. Panneerselvam	DMK	SPA	
Theni	201	Cumbum	P. L. A. Jeganathmishra	TVK	TVK+	
Virudhunagar	202	Rajapalayam	K. Jegadeshwari	TVK	TVK+	Cabinet Minister
Virudhunagar	203	Srivilliputhur (SC)	A. Karthik	TVK	TVK+	
Virudhunagar	204	Sattur	A. Kadarkarairaj	DMK	SPA	
Virudhunagar	205	Sivakasi	S. Keerthana	TVK	TVK+	Cabinet Minister
Virudhunagar	206	Virudhunagar	P. Selvam	TVK	TVK+	
Virudhunagar	207	Aruppukkottai	K. K. S. S. R. Ramachandran	DMK	SPA	
Virudhunagar	208	Tiruchuli	Thangam Thenarasu	DMK	SPA	
Ramanathapuram	209	Paramakudi (SC)	K. K. Kathiravan	DMK	SPA	
Ramanathapuram	210	Tiruvadanai	Rajeev	TVK	TVK+	Cabinet Minister
Ramanathapuram	211	Ramanathapuram	Katharbatcha Muthuramalingam	DMK	SPA	
Ramanathapuram	212	Mudhukulathur	R. S. Rajakannappan	DMK	SPA	
Thoothukudi	213	Vilathikulam	G. V. Markandayan	DMK	SPA	
Thoothukudi	214	Thoothukkudi	Srinath	TVK	TVK+	Cabinet Minister
Thoothukudi	215	Tiruchendur	Anitha R. Radhakrishnan	DMK	SPA	
Thoothukudi	216	Srivaikuntam	G. Saravanan	TVK	TVK+	
Thoothukudi	217	Ottapidaram (SC)	P. Mathanraja	TVK	TVK+	Cabinet Minister
Thoothukudi	218	Kovilpatti	K. Karunanithi	DMK	SPA	
Tenkasi	219	Sankarankovil (SC)	Dhilipan Jaishankar	AIADMK	NDA	Supported TVK; Later declared support for EPS
Tenkasi	220	Vasudevanallur (SC)	E. Raja	DMK	SPA	
Tenkasi	221	Kadayanallur	T. M. Rajendran	DMK	SPA	
Tenkasi	222	Tenkasi	Kalai Kathiravan	DMK	SPA	
Tenkasi	223	Alangulam	P. H. Manoj Pandian	DMK	SPA	
Tirunelveli	224	Tirunelveli	R. S. Murughan	TVK	TVK+	
Tirunelveli	225	Ambasamudram	Esakki Subaya	AIADMK	NDA	Supported TVK
Tirunelveli	225	Ambasamudram	Vacant			On 26 May 2026, resigned from office and officially joined TVK
Tirunelveli	226	Palayamkottai	M. Abdul Wahab	DMK	SPA	
Tirunelveli	227	Nanguneri	Reddiarpatti V. Narayanan	TVK	TVK+	
Tirunelveli	228	Radhapuram	Sathish Christopher	TVK	TVK+	
Kanyakumari	229	Kanniyakumari	N. Thalavai Sundaram	AIADMK	NDA	Opposed TVK
Kanyakumari	230	Nagercoil	S. Austin	DMK	SPA	
Kanyakumari	231	Colachal	Tharahai Cuthbert	INC	TVK+	Won as SPA candidate; party switched to TVK+ post-election
Kanyakumari	232	Padmanabhapuram	R. Chellaswamy	CPI(M)	LDF	Won as SPA candidate; party switched to TVK+ post-election; outside support to TVK government
Kanyakumari	233	Vilavancode	T. T. Praveen	INC	TVK+	Won as SPA candidate; party switched to TVK+ post-election
Kanyakumari	234	Killiyoor	S. Rajeshkumar	INC	TVK+	Won as SPA candidate; party switched to TVK+ post-election; Cabinet Minister

== See also ==
- Government of Tamil Nadu
- List of chief ministers of Tamil Nadu
- Legislative assembly of Tamil Nadu
