= C. Joseph Vijay ministry =

Government of Tamil Nadu, India since 2026

- 22nd Cabinet of Tamil Nadu
- 2026–present
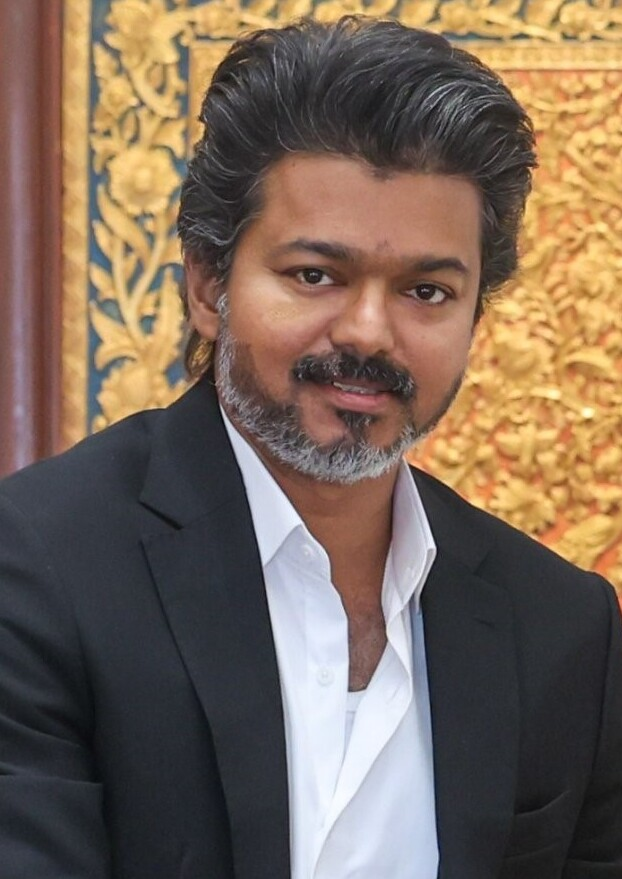
- Date formed: 10 May 2026

People and organisations
- Governor: Rajendra Arlekar
- Chief Minister: C. Joseph Vijay
- No. of ministers: 1 Chief minister 34 Cabinet ministers
- Total no. of members: 123; SSJVA 118; Outside support and confidence 5
- Member parties: TVK (31); INC (2); IUML (1); VCK (1)
- Status in legislature: Coalition
- Opposition party: DMK
- Opposition leader: Udhayanidhi Stalin

History
- Election: 2026
- Legislature term: 2026–present
- Predecessor: M. K. Stalin ministry

C. Joseph Vijay ministry is the Council of Ministers headed by C. Joseph Vijay, who was sworn in as the 22nd Chief Minister of Tamil Nadu on 10 May 2026 after the 17th Tamil Nadu Assembly was constituted after the 2026 Tamil Nadu Legislative Assembly election.

In the 2026 election, the Tamilaga Vettri Kazhagam (TVK), led by Vijay, emerged as the single largest party in the assembly with 108 seats. The party subsequently entered into an alliance with Indian National Congress, which won five seats. The Communist Party of India, and Communist Party of India (Marxist), Viduthalai Chiruthaigal Katchi (VCK), and Indian Union Muslim League (IUML), which won two seats each, later extended support to the TVK, which enabled it to form the government.

Governor Rajendra Arlekar administered the oath of office and secrecy to Vijay and nine other ministers of the cabinet at the Jawaharlal Nehru Indoor Stadium in Chennai on 10 May 2026. This marked the first time since 1967 that Tamil Nadu had a government led by a non-Dravidian party. Later on 10 May 2026, Vijay resigned from the Tiruchirappalli (East) Assembly constituency and retained the Perambur Assembly constituency, thereby reducing the strength of the TVK in the assembly by one. On 21 May 2026, the governor administered oaths to 23 new ministers who were inducted into the cabinet including two from the Congress. On the next day, two more ministers, one each from the IUML and the VCK, joined the cabinet.

== Council of Ministers ==
Source:Government of Tamil Nadu

Sr. No.	Name	Portait	Constituency	Portfolio(s)	Party	Term of office	
Sr. No.	Name	Portait	Constituency	Portfolio(s)	Party	Took office	Duration
Chief Minister
1	C. Joseph Vijay		Perambur	Public, General Administration, Indian Administrative Service, Indian Police Service, Indian Forest Service, District Revenue Officers; Police; Home; Special Programme Implementation, Poverty Alleviation and Rural Indebtedness; Special Initiatives; Youth Welfare; Welfare of Children, Aged, and Differently Abled Persons; Municipal Administration, Urban and Water Supply	TVK	10 May 2026	185 days
Cabinet ministers
2	N. Anand		Thiyagarayanagar	Rural Development, Panchayats and Panchayat Union; Irrigation, Irrigation Projects including Small Irrigation	TVK	10 May 2026	185 days
3	Aadhav Arjuna		Villivakkam	Public Works (Buildings); Highways and Minor Ports; Sports Development	TVK	10 May 2026	185 days
4	K. G. Arunraj		Tiruchengode	Health, Medical Education and Family Welfare	TVK	10 May 2026	185 days
5	K. A. Sengottaiyan		Gobichettipalayam	Revenue, District Revenue Establishment, Deputy Collectors, Disaster Management, Boodhan, Gramadhan; Legislative Assembly	TVK	10 May 2026	185 days
6	P. Venkataramanan		Mylapore	Food and Civil Supplies, Consumer Protection and Price Control	TVK	10 May 2026	185 days
7	C. T. R. Nirmal Kumar		Thiruparankundram	Electricity & Non-Conventional Energy Development; Law, Courts, Prisons, Prevention of Corruption; Governor; Elections and Passports	TVK	10 May 2026	185 days
8	Rajmohan Arumugam		Egmore	School Education; Archaeology; Tamil Official Language and Tamil Culture, Information & Publicity, Film Technology and Cinematograph Act, Newsprint Control, Stationery and Printing, Government Press	TVK	10 May 2026	185 days
9	T. K. Prabhu		Karaikudi	Minerals and Mines	TVK	10 May 2026	185 days
10	S. Keerthana		Sivakasi	Industries, Investment Promotion	TVK	10 May 2026	185 days
11	P. Viswanathan		Melur	Higher Education including Technical Education, Electronics, Science and Technology	INC	21 May 2026	174 days
12	S. Rajeshkumar		Killiyoor	Tourism and Tourism Development Corporation	INC	21 May 2026	174 days
13	A. M. Shahjahan		Papanasam	Minorities Welfare and Wakf Board	IUML	22 May 2026	173 days
14	Vanni Arasu		Tindivanam	Adi Dravidar Welfare and Hill Tribes	VCK	22 May 2026	173 days
15	Vijay Tamilan Parthiban		Salem South	Motor Vehicle Acts – Administration, Transport, Nationalised Transport and Motor Vehicles Act	TVK	21 May 2026	174 days
16	B. Rajkumar		Cuddalore	Housing, Rural Housing, Town Planning Projects and Housing Development, Accommodation Control, Tamil Nadu Urban Habitat Development Board, Urban Planning and Urban Development; CMDA	TVK	21 May 2026	174 days
17	V. Sampath Kumar		Coimbatore North	Backward Classes Welfare, Most Backward Classes Welfare and De-notified Communities Welfare	TVK	21 May 2026	174 days
18	M. Vijay Balaji		Erode East	Handlooms and Textiles, Khadi and Village Industries Board	TVK	21 May 2026	174 days
19	K. Vignesh		Kinathukadavu	Prohibition and Excise	TVK	21 May 2026	174 days
20	Thennarasu. K.		Sriperumbudur	Non-Resident Tamils Welfare, Refugees & evacuees	TVK	21 May 2026	174 days
21	J. Mohamed Farvas		Arantangi	Labour Welfare, Population, Employment and Training, Urban and Rural Employment and Bonded Labour Welfare; Census	TVK	21 May 2026	174 days
22	V. Gandhiraj		Arakkonam	Co-operation	TVK	21 May 2026	174 days
23	Jegadeshwari. K.		Rajapalayam	Social Welfare including Women Welfare; Orphanages and Correctional Administration and Beggar Homes and Social Reforms & Nutritious Meal Programme	TVK	21 May 2026	174 days
24	R. Vinoth		Kumbakonam	Agriculture, Agricultural Engineering, Agro Service Co-operatives, Horticulture, Sugar, Sugarcane Excise, Sugarcane Development and Waste Land Development	TVK	21 May 2026	174 days
25	C. Vijayalakshmi		Kumarapalayam	Milk and Dairy Development	TVK	21 May 2026	174 days
26	D. Sarathkumar		Tambaram	Human Resources Management & Ex-Servicemen Welfare	TVK	21 May 2026	174 days
27	S. Ramesh		Srirangam	Hindu Religious and Charitable Endowments	TVK	21 May 2026	174 days
28	P. Mathanraja		Ottapidaram	Rural Industries including Cottage Industries, Small Industries	TVK	21 May 2026	174 days
29	N. Marie Wilson		R. K. Nagar	Finance, Pensions and Pensionary Benefits; Planning & Development	TVK	21 May 2026	174 days
30	Srinath		Thoothukkudi	Fisheries, Fisheries Development Corporation	TVK	21 May 2026	174 days
31	S. Kamali		Avanashi	Animal Husbandry	TVK	21 May 2026	174 days
32	R. Kumar		Velachery	Artificial Intelligence, Information Technology and Digital Services	TVK	21 May 2026	174 days
33	R. V. Ranjithkumar		Kancheepuram	Forests	TVK	21 May 2026	174 days
34	Logesh Tamilselvan		Rasipuram	Commercial Taxes, Registration and Stamp Act, Debt Relief including legislation on Money lending, Chits and Registration of Companies	TVK	21 May 2026	174 days
35	Rajeev		Tiruvadanai	Environment, Pollution Control Board, Climate Change	TVK	21 May 2026	174 days

== Ministerial changes ==
=== 21 May 2026 ===
Name	Existing Portfolios	Proposed Portfolios
C. Joseph Vijay	Public; General Administration; Indian Administrative Service; Indian Police Service; Indian Forest Service; District Revenue Officers; Police; Home; Special Programme Implementation; ~~Women Welfare~~; Youth Welfare; Welfare of Children; Aged, Differently Abled Persons; Municipal Administration; Urban and Water Supply.	Public; General Administration; Indian Administrative Service; Indian Police Service; Indian Forest Service; District Revenue Officers; Police; Home; Special Programme Implementation; Special Initiatives; Poverty Alleviation and Rural Indebtedness; Youth Welfare; Welfare of Children; Aged, Differently Abled Persons; Municipal Administration; Urban and Water Supply.
N. Anand	Rural Development; Panchayats and Panchayat Union; ~~Poverty alleviation Programme~~; ~~Rural Indebtedness~~; Irrigation; Irrigation Projects including Small Irrigation.	Rural Development; Panchayats and Panchayat Union; Irrigation; Irrigation Projects including Small Irrigation.
C. T. R. Nirmal Kumar	Electricity; Non- Conventional Energy Development; Law; Courts; Prisons; Prevention of Corruption; ~~Legislative Assembly~~; Governor; Elections; Passports.	Electricity; Non- Conventional Energy Development; Law; Courts; Prisons; Prevention of Corruption; Governor; Elections; Passports.
K. A. Sengottaiyan	~~Finance~~; ~~Pensions and Pension Allowances~~	Revenue; District Revenue Establishment; Deputy Collectors; Disaster Management; Boodhan; Gramadhan; Legislative Assembly

== Ministers by political party ==
Party	Count of ministers
Tamilaga Vettri Kazhagam	31
Indian National Congress	2
Indian Union Muslim League	1
Viduthalai Chiruthaigal Katchi	1
Total	35

== Demographics ==
Ministers by district (Note: Based on the location of the assembly constituency from which the corresponding member was elected from.)
#	District	Ministers	Name
1	Ariyalur		
2	Chengalpattu	1	D. Sarathkumar
3	Chennai	7	C. Joseph Vijay (Chief Minister); N. Anand; Aadhav Arjuna; P. Venkataramanan; Rajmohan Arumugam; N. Marie Wilson; R. Kumar
4	Coimbatore	2	V. Sampath Kumar; K. Vignesh
5	Cuddalore	1	B. Rajkumar
6	Dharmapuri		
7	Dindigul		
8	Erode	2	K. A. Sengottaiyan (Leader of the House); M. Vijay Balaji
9	Kallakurichi		
10	Kanchipuram	2	R. V. Ranjithkumar; Thennarasu. K.
11	Kanniyakumari	1	S. Rajesh Kumar
12	Karur		
13	Krishnagiri		
14	Madurai	2	C. T. R. Nirmal Kumar; P. Viswanathan
15	Mayiladuthurai		
16	Nagapattinam		
17	Namakkal	3	K. G. Arunraj; C. Vijayalakshmi; Logesh Tamilselvan
18	Nilgiris		
19	Perambalur		
20	Pudukkottai	1	J. Mohamed Farvas
21	Ramanathapuram	1	Rajeev
22	Ranipet	1	V. Gandhiraj
23	Salem	1	Vijay Tamilan Parthiban
24	Sivagangai	1	T. K. Prabhu
25	Tenkasi		
26	Thanjavur	2	R. Vinoth; A. M. Shahjahan
27	Theni		
28	Thoothukudi	2	A. Srinath; P. Mathanraja
29	Tiruchirappalli	1	S. Ramesh
30	Tirunelveli		
31	Tirupathur		
32	Tiruppur	1	Kamali. S.
33	Tiruvallur		
34	Tiruvannamalai		
35	Tiruvarur		
36	Vellore		
37	Viluppuram	1	Vanni Arasu
38	Virudhunagar	2	S. Keerthana; Jegadeshwari. K.
