= Tamil Nadu Council of Ministers =

Executive branch of Indian state government

- Council of Ministers of Tamil Nadu
- C. Joseph Vijay ministry
- Date formed: 10 May 2026

People and organisations
- Governor: Rajendra Arlekar
- Chief Minister: C. Joseph Vijay
- No. of ministers: 1 Chief minister 34 Cabinet ministers
- Member parties: TVK (31); INC (2); IUML (1); VCK (1)
- Status in legislature: Coalition

History
- Election: 2026
- Outgoing election: 2021
- Legislature term: 2026–present
- Predecessor: M. K. Stalin ministry

The Tamil Nadu Council of Ministers is the executive wing of the Government of Tamil Nadu and is headed by the Chief Minister, who is the head of government and leader of the state cabinet.

The current state council of ministers were sworn in on 10 May 2026, following the 2026 Tamil Nadu Legislative Assembly election. The term of every executive wing is for 5 years. The council of ministers are assisted by department secretaries attached to each ministry who are from the Tamil Nadu cadre of the IAS. The chief executive officer responsible for issuing orders on behalf of the Government is the Chief Secretary to the State Government, currently M. Sai Kumar, who assumed office on 8 April 2026.

== Constitutional requirement ==
=== For the Council of Ministers to aid and advise Governor ===
According to Article 163 of the Indian Constitution, there shall be a Council of Ministers with the Chief Minister at the head to aid and advise the Governor in the exercise of his functions.

# There shall be a Council of Ministers with the Chief Minister at the head to aid and advise the Governor in the exercise of his function, except in so far as he is by or under this Constitution required to exercise his functions or any of them in his discretion.

1. If any question arises whether any matter is or is not a matter as respects which the Governor is by or under this Constitution required to act in his discretion, the decision of the Governor in his discretion shall be final, and the validity of anything done by the Governor shall not be called in question on the ground that he ought or ought not to have acted in his discretion.
2. The question whether any, and if so what, advice was tendered by Ministers to the Governor shall not be inquired into in any court.

This means that the Ministers serve under the pleasure of the Governor and he/she may remove them, on the advice of the Chief Minister, whenever they want.

=== For other provisions as to Ministers ===
The Chief Minister shall be appointed by the Governor and the other Ministers shall be appointed by the Governor on the advice of the Chief Minister, and the Minister shall hold office during the pleasure of the Governor.

# The Council of Minister shall be collectively responsible to the Legislative Assembly of the State.

1. Before a Minister enters upon his office, the Governor shall administer to him the oaths of office and of secrecy according to the forms set out for the purpose in the Third Schedule.
2. A Minister who for any period of six consecutive months is not a member of the Legislature of the State shall at the expiration of that period cease to be a Minister.
3. The salaries and allowances of Ministers shall be such as the Legislature of the State may from time to time by law determine and, until the Legislature of the State so determines, shall be as specified in the Second Schedule.

The 91st Constitutional Amendment Act, 2003 inserted Article 164(1A), capping the total number of ministers, including the Chief Minister, at 15 per cent of the total membership of the Legislative Assembly, with a minimum of twelve ministers. For Tamil Nadu's 234-member Assembly, this places the maximum cabinet size at 35 ministers.

== Chief Minister ==
The Chief Minister of Tamil Nadu is the real head of the government and responsible for state administration. He is the leader of the parliamentary party in the legislature and heads the state cabinet. The current Chief Minister is C. Joseph Vijay, president of the Tamilaga Vettri Kazhagam, who was sworn in on 10 May 2026 as the 16th Chief Minister of Tamil Nadu. His election ended nearly six decades of alternating rule between the DMK and the AIADMK.

== Deputy Chief Minister ==
The Deputy Chief Minister of Tamil Nadu is the deputy head of the government and senior minister of the cabinet after the Chief Minister. The current Vijay ministry has not designated a Deputy Chief Minister.

== State Cabinet ==
As per the Indian Constitution, all portfolios of state government are vested in the Chief Minister, who distributes various portfolios to individual ministers whom he nominates to the State Governor. The state governor appoints individual ministers for various portfolios and departments as per the advice of the Chief Minister, and together they form the State Cabinet. Actions of individual ministers are part of the collective responsibility of the state cabinet, and the Chief Minister is responsible for the actions of each minister. The state cabinet along with the Chief Minister prepares general policy and individual department policy, which guides the day-to-day administration of each minister.

== Council of Ministers ==
Source:Government of Tamil Nadu

Sr. No.	Name	Portait	Constituency	Portfolio(s)	Party	Term of office	
Sr. No.	Name	Portait	Constituency	Portfolio(s)	Party	Took office	Duration
Chief Minister
1	C. Joseph Vijay		Perambur	Public, General Administration, Indian Administrative Service, Indian Police Service, Indian Forest Service, District Revenue Officers; Police; Home; Special Programme Implementation, Poverty Alleviation and Rural Indebtedness; Special Initiatives; Youth Welfare; Welfare of Children, Aged, and Differently Abled Persons; Municipal Administration, Urban and Water Supply	TVK	10 May 2026	179 days
Cabinet ministers
2	N. Anand		Thiyagarayanagar	Rural Development, Panchayats and Panchayat Union; Irrigation, Irrigation Projects including Small Irrigation	TVK	10 May 2026	179 days
3	Aadhav Arjuna		Villivakkam	Public Works (Buildings); Highways and Minor Ports; Sports Development	TVK	10 May 2026	179 days
4	K. G. Arunraj		Tiruchengode	Health, Medical Education and Family Welfare	TVK	10 May 2026	179 days
5	K. A. Sengottaiyan		Gobichettipalayam	Revenue, District Revenue Establishment, Deputy Collectors, Disaster Management, Boodhan, Gramadhan; Legislative Assembly	TVK	10 May 2026	179 days
6	P. Venkataramanan		Mylapore	Food and Civil Supplies, Consumer Protection and Price Control	TVK	10 May 2026	179 days
7	C. T. R. Nirmal Kumar		Thiruparankundram	Electricity & Non-Conventional Energy Development; Law, Courts, Prisons, Prevention of Corruption; Governor; Elections and Passports	TVK	10 May 2026	179 days
8	Rajmohan Arumugam		Egmore	School Education; Archaeology; Tamil Official Language and Tamil Culture, Information & Publicity, Film Technology and Cinematograph Act, Newsprint Control, Stationery and Printing, Government Press	TVK	10 May 2026	179 days
9	T. K. Prabhu		Karaikudi	Minerals and Mines	TVK	10 May 2026	179 days
10	S. Keerthana		Sivakasi	Industries, Investment Promotion	TVK	10 May 2026	179 days
11	P. Viswanathan		Melur	Higher Education including Technical Education, Electronics, Science and Technology	INC	21 May 2026	168 days
12	S. Rajeshkumar		Killiyoor	Tourism and Tourism Development Corporation	INC	21 May 2026	168 days
13	A. M. Shahjahan		Papanasam	Minorities Welfare and Wakf Board	IUML	22 May 2026	167 days
14	Vanni Arasu		Tindivanam	Adi Dravidar Welfare and Hill Tribes	VCK	22 May 2026	167 days
15	Vijay Tamilan Parthiban		Salem South	Motor Vehicle Acts – Administration, Transport, Nationalised Transport and Motor Vehicles Act	TVK	21 May 2026	168 days
16	B. Rajkumar		Cuddalore	Housing, Rural Housing, Town Planning Projects and Housing Development, Accommodation Control, Tamil Nadu Urban Habitat Development Board, Urban Planning and Urban Development; CMDA	TVK	21 May 2026	168 days
17	V. Sampath Kumar		Coimbatore North	Backward Classes Welfare, Most Backward Classes Welfare and De-notified Communities Welfare	TVK	21 May 2026	168 days
18	M. Vijay Balaji		Erode East	Handlooms and Textiles, Khadi and Village Industries Board	TVK	21 May 2026	168 days
19	K. Vignesh		Kinathukadavu	Prohibition and Excise	TVK	21 May 2026	168 days
20	Thennarasu. K.		Sriperumbudur	Non-Resident Tamils Welfare, Refugees & evacuees	TVK	21 May 2026	168 days
21	J. Mohamed Farvas		Arantangi	Labour Welfare, Population, Employment and Training, Urban and Rural Employment and Bonded Labour Welfare; Census	TVK	21 May 2026	168 days
22	V. Gandhiraj		Arakkonam	Co-operation	TVK	21 May 2026	168 days
23	Jegadeshwari. K.		Rajapalayam	Social Welfare including Women Welfare; Orphanages and Correctional Administration and Beggar Homes and Social Reforms & Nutritious Meal Programme	TVK	21 May 2026	168 days
24	R. Vinoth		Kumbakonam	Agriculture, Agricultural Engineering, Agro Service Co-operatives, Horticulture, Sugar, Sugarcane Excise, Sugarcane Development and Waste Land Development	TVK	21 May 2026	168 days
25	C. Vijayalakshmi		Kumarapalayam	Milk and Dairy Development	TVK	21 May 2026	168 days
26	D. Sarathkumar		Tambaram	Human Resources Management & Ex-Servicemen Welfare	TVK	21 May 2026	168 days
27	S. Ramesh		Srirangam	Hindu Religious and Charitable Endowments	TVK	21 May 2026	168 days
28	P. Mathanraja		Ottapidaram	Rural Industries including Cottage Industries, Small Industries	TVK	21 May 2026	168 days
29	N. Marie Wilson		R. K. Nagar	Finance, Pensions and Pensionary Benefits; Planning & Development	TVK	21 May 2026	168 days
30	Srinath		Thoothukkudi	Fisheries, Fisheries Development Corporation	TVK	21 May 2026	168 days
31	S. Kamali		Avanashi	Animal Husbandry	TVK	21 May 2026	168 days
32	R. Kumar		Velachery	Artificial Intelligence, Information Technology and Digital Services	TVK	21 May 2026	168 days
33	R. V. Ranjithkumar		Kancheepuram	Forests	TVK	21 May 2026	168 days
34	Logesh Tamilselvan		Rasipuram	Commercial Taxes, Registration and Stamp Act, Debt Relief including legislation on Money lending, Chits and Registration of Companies	TVK	21 May 2026	168 days
35	Rajeev		Tiruvadanai	Environment, Pollution Control Board, Climate Change	TVK	21 May 2026	168 days

== List of cabinets of Tamil Nadu ==
No.	Ministry	Chief Minister	Assembly (Election)	Political party
1	Rajagopalachari I	C. Rajagopalachari	1st (1952)	Indian National Congress
2	Kamaraj I	K. Kamaraj	1st (1952)	Indian National Congress
3	Kamaraj II	K. Kamaraj	2nd (1957)	Indian National Congress
4	Kamaraj III	K. Kamaraj	3rd (1962)	Indian National Congress
5	Bhakthavatsalam I	M. Bhakthavatsalam	3rd (1962)	Indian National Congress
6	Annadurai I	C. N. Annadurai	4th (1967)	Dravida Munnetra Kazhagam
Interim	Nedunchezhiyan I	V. R. Nedunchezhiyan	4th (1967)	Dravida Munnetra Kazhagam
7	Karunanidhi I	M. Karunanidhi	4th (1967)	Dravida Munnetra Kazhagam
8	Karunanidhi II	M. Karunanidhi	5th (1971)	Dravida Munnetra Kazhagam
9	MGR I	M. G. Ramachandran	6th (1977)	All India Anna Dravida Munnetra Kazhagam
10	MGR II	M. G. Ramachandran	7th (1980)	All India Anna Dravida Munnetra Kazhagam
11	MGR III	M. G. Ramachandran	8th (1984)	All India Anna Dravida Munnetra Kazhagam
Interim	Nedunchezhiyan II	V. R. Nedunchezhiyan	8th (1984)	All India Anna Dravida Munnetra Kazhagam
12	Janaki I	V. N. Janaki Ramachandran	8th (1984)	All India Anna Dravida Munnetra Kazhagam
13	Third Karunanidhi ministry	M. Karunanidhi	9th (1989)	Dravida Munnetra Kazhagam
14	Jayalalithaa I	J. Jayalalithaa	10th (1991)	All India Anna Dravida Munnetra Kazhagam
15	Karunanidhi IV	M. Karunanidhi	11th (1996)	Dravida Munnetra Kazhagam
16	Jayalalithaa II	J. Jayalalithaa	12th (2001)	All India Anna Dravida Munnetra Kazhagam
17	Panneerselvam I	O. Panneerselvam	12th (2001)	All India Anna Dravida Munnetra Kazhagam
18	Jayalalithaa III	J. Jayalalithaa	12th (2001)	All India Anna Dravida Munnetra Kazhagam
19	Karunanidhi V	M. Karunanidhi	13th (2006)	Dravida Munnetra Kazhagam
20	Jayalalithaa IV	J. Jayalalithaa	14th (2011)	All India Anna Dravida Munnetra Kazhagam
21	Panneerselvam II	O. Panneerselvam	14th (2011)	All India Anna Dravida Munnetra Kazhagam
22	Jayalalithaa V	J. Jayalalithaa	14th (2011)	All India Anna Dravida Munnetra Kazhagam
23	Jayalalithaa VI	J. Jayalalithaa	15th (2016)	All India Anna Dravida Munnetra Kazhagam
24	Panneerselvam I	O. Panneerselvam	15th (2016)	All India Anna Dravida Munnetra Kazhagam
25	Palaniswami I	Edappadi K. Palaniswami	15th (2016)	All India Anna Dravida Munnetra Kazhagam
26	Stalin I	M. K. Stalin	16th (2021)	Dravida Munnetra Kazhagam
27	Vijay I	C. Joseph Vijay	17th (2026)	Tamilaga Vettri Kazhagam

== Oath as the state chief minister ==
I, <Name of Chief Minister>, do swear in the name of God/solemnly affirm that I will bear true faith and allegiance to the Constitution of India as by law established, that I will uphold the sovereignty and integrity of India, that I will faithfully and conscientiously discharge my duties as a Minister for the State of () and that I will do right to all manner of people in accordance with the Constitution and the law without fear or favour, affection or ill-will.

== See also ==
- Government of Tamil Nadu
- Legislature of Tamil Nadu
- Chief Ministers of Tamil Nadu
- List of Tamil Nadu governmental organisations
- Tamil Nadu Government's Departments
- Government of India
- Cabinet of India
