= Civil Services of Tamil Nadu =

State government services in India

Government of Tamil Nadu
- Seat of Government: Chennai

Legislative branch
- Assembly: Tamil Nadu Legislative Assembly
- Speaker: Appavu
- Council: None
- Chairman: None
- Deputy Chair: none

Executive branch
- Governor: R. N. Ravi
- Chief Minister: M.K. Stalin
- Chief Secretary: Shiv Das Meena I.A.S.,

Judiciary
- High Court: Madras High Court
- Chief Justice: S. V. Gangapurwala

The Civil Services of Tamil Nadu (Tamil: தமிழ்நாடு குடியியல் பணிகள்) (known simply as the Civil Services) refer to the civil service and the permanent bureaucracy of the Government of Tamil Nadu.

== Authority ==
- Government of Tamil Nadu
- Tamil Nadu Public Service Commission
- Department of Personnel and Administrative Reforms (Tamil Nadu)

== Recruitment ==
Recruitment to the Tamil Nadu Civil Services is carried out in two ways:

- Direct Recruitment through a competitive examination called the "TNPSC Group 1 to 8 Exam", organized by the Tamil Nadu Public Service Commission (TNPSC).
- Recruitment by Transfer from exiting Service

== Employment by agency ==
- Department of Agriculture (Tamil Nadu)
- Department of Animal Husbandry, Dairying and Fisheries (Tamil Nadu)
- Department of Backward Classes, Most Backward Classes and Minorities Welfare (Tamil Nadu)
- Department of Co-operation, Food and Consumer Protection (Tamil Nadu)
- Department of Commercial Taxes and Registration (Tamil Nadu)
- Department of Energy (Tamil Nadu)
- Department of Environment and Forests (Tamil Nadu)
- Department of Finance (Tamil Nadu)
- Department of Handlooms, Handicrafts, Textiles and Khadi (Tamil Nadu)
- Department of Health and Family Welfare (Tamil Nadu)
- Department of Higher Education (Tamil Nadu)
- Department of Highways and Minor Ports (Tamil Nadu)
- Department of Home, Prohibition and Excise (Tamil Nadu)
- Department of Housing and Urban Development (Tamil Nadu)
- Department of Industries (Tamil Nadu)
- Department of Information Technology (Tamil Nadu)
- Department of Labour and Employment (Tamil Nadu)
- Department of Law (Tamil Nadu)
- Department of Legislative Assembly (Tamil Nadu)
- Department of Municipal Administration and Water Supply (Tamil Nadu)
- Department of Micro, Small and Medium Enterprises (Tamil Nadu)
- Department of Personnel and Administrative Reforms (Tamil Nadu)
- Department of Planning, Development and Special Initiatives (Tamil Nadu)
- Department of Public (Tamil Nadu)
- Department of Public Works (Tamil Nadu)
- Department of Revenue (Tamil Nadu)
- Department of Rural Development and Panchayat Raj (Tamil Nadu)
- Department of School Education (Tamil Nadu)
- Department of Social Justice (Tamil Nadu)
- Department of Social Reforms (Tamil Nadu)
- Department of Social Welfare and Nutritious Meal Programme (Tamil Nadu)
- Department of Special Programme Implementation (Tamil Nadu)
- Department of Tourism and Culture (Tamil Nadu)
- Department of Tamil Development, Religious Endowments and Information (Tamil Nadu)
- Department of Transport (Tamil Nadu)
- Department of Youth Welfare and Sports Development (Tamil Nadu)
- Department of Welfare of Differently Abled Persons (Tamil Nadu)

== See also ==
- Tamil Nadu Public Service Commission
- Government of Tamil Nadu
- Civil Services of India
- Union Public Service Commission
