= Government of Tamil Nadu =

Indian state government

- State: Tamil Nadu
- Country: India
- Website: tn.gov.in

Legislative branch
- Assembly: Tamil Nadu Legislative Assembly
- Speaker: J. C. D. Prabhakar
- Deputy Speaker: M. Ravisankar
- Assembly members: 234
- Meeting place: Fort St. George

Executive branch
- Governor: Rajendra Arlekar
- Chief Minister: C. Joseph Vijay
- Chief Secretary: M. Sai Kumar
- Headquarters: Chennai
- Departments: 43

Judicial branch
- High Court: Madras High Court
- Chief Justice: S. A. Dharmadhikari

The Government of Tamil Nadu (IPA: [t̪əmɪɻnɑːɖʉ əɾəsʉ]) is the administrative body responsible for the governance of the Indian state of Tamil Nadu. Chennai is the capital of the state and houses the state's executive, legislature and its apex judiciary.

Under the Constitution of India, de jure executive authority lies with the governor, although this authority is exercised only by, or on the advice of, the chief minister, the de facto authority and the cabinet. Following elections to the Tamil Nadu Legislative Assembly, the state's governor usually invites the party (or coalition) with a majority of seats to form the government. The governor appoints the chief minister, whose council of ministers are collectively responsible to the assembly.

Legislative assembly elections are held every five years to elect a new assembly, unless there is a successful vote of no confidence in the government or a two-thirds vote for a snap election in the assembly, in which case an election may be held sooner. The legislature of Tamil Nadu was bicameral until 1986, when it was replaced by a unicameral legislature. The judiciary branch is led by a High Court (Madras High Court) led by a Chief Justice.

== Executive ==
Administrative officials
Title	Name
Governor	Rajendra Arlekar
Chief minister	C. Joseph Vijay
Chief Justice	S. A. Dharmadhikari

The Governor is the de jure constitutional head of state while the Chief Minister is the de facto chief executive. The governor is appointed by the President of India. Following elections to the Tamil Nadu Legislative Assembly, the state's governor usually invites the party (or coalition) with a majority of seats to form the government. The governor appoints the chief minister, whose council of ministers are collectively responsible to the assembly. Given that he has the confidence of the assembly, the chief minister's term is for five years and is subject to no term limits. Chennai is the capital of the state and houses the state executive, legislative and head of judiciary.

== Council of Ministers ==
Source:Government of Tamil Nadu

Sr. No.	Name	Portait	Constituency	Portfolio(s)	Party	Term of office	
Sr. No.	Name	Portait	Constituency	Portfolio(s)	Party	Took office	Duration
Chief Minister
1	C. Joseph Vijay		Perambur	Public, General Administration, Indian Administrative Service, Indian Police Service, Indian Forest Service, District Revenue Officers; Police; Home; Special Programme Implementation, Poverty Alleviation and Rural Indebtedness; Special Initiatives; Youth Welfare; Welfare of Children, Aged, and Differently Abled Persons; Municipal Administration, Urban and Water Supply	TVK	10 May 2026	174 days
Cabinet ministers
2	N. Anand		Thiyagarayanagar	Rural Development, Panchayats and Panchayat Union; Irrigation, Irrigation Projects including Small Irrigation	TVK	10 May 2026	174 days
3	Aadhav Arjuna		Villivakkam	Public Works (Buildings); Highways and Minor Ports; Sports Development	TVK	10 May 2026	174 days
4	K. G. Arunraj		Tiruchengode	Health, Medical Education and Family Welfare	TVK	10 May 2026	174 days
5	K. A. Sengottaiyan		Gobichettipalayam	Revenue, District Revenue Establishment, Deputy Collectors, Disaster Management, Boodhan, Gramadhan; Legislative Assembly	TVK	10 May 2026	174 days
6	P. Venkataramanan		Mylapore	Food and Civil Supplies, Consumer Protection and Price Control	TVK	10 May 2026	174 days
7	C. T. R. Nirmal Kumar		Thiruparankundram	Electricity & Non-Conventional Energy Development; Law, Courts, Prisons, Prevention of Corruption; Governor; Elections and Passports	TVK	10 May 2026	174 days
8	Rajmohan Arumugam		Egmore	School Education; Archaeology; Tamil Official Language and Tamil Culture, Information & Publicity, Film Technology and Cinematograph Act, Newsprint Control, Stationery and Printing, Government Press	TVK	10 May 2026	174 days
9	T. K. Prabhu		Karaikudi	Minerals and Mines	TVK	10 May 2026	174 days
10	S. Keerthana		Sivakasi	Industries, Investment Promotion	TVK	10 May 2026	174 days
11	P. Viswanathan		Melur	Higher Education including Technical Education, Electronics, Science and Technology	INC	21 May 2026	163 days
12	S. Rajeshkumar		Killiyoor	Tourism and Tourism Development Corporation	INC	21 May 2026	163 days
13	A. M. Shahjahan		Papanasam	Minorities Welfare and Wakf Board	IUML	22 May 2026	162 days
14	Vanni Arasu		Tindivanam	Adi Dravidar Welfare and Hill Tribes	VCK	22 May 2026	162 days
15	Vijay Tamilan Parthiban		Salem South	Motor Vehicle Acts – Administration, Transport, Nationalised Transport and Motor Vehicles Act	TVK	21 May 2026	163 days
16	B. Rajkumar		Cuddalore	Housing, Rural Housing, Town Planning Projects and Housing Development, Accommodation Control, Tamil Nadu Urban Habitat Development Board, Urban Planning and Urban Development; CMDA	TVK	21 May 2026	163 days
17	V. Sampath Kumar		Coimbatore North	Backward Classes Welfare, Most Backward Classes Welfare and De-notified Communities Welfare	TVK	21 May 2026	163 days
18	M. Vijay Balaji		Erode East	Handlooms and Textiles, Khadi and Village Industries Board	TVK	21 May 2026	163 days
19	K. Vignesh		Kinathukadavu	Prohibition and Excise	TVK	21 May 2026	163 days
20	Thennarasu. K.		Sriperumbudur	Non-Resident Tamils Welfare, Refugees & evacuees	TVK	21 May 2026	163 days
21	J. Mohamed Farvas		Arantangi	Labour Welfare, Population, Employment and Training, Urban and Rural Employment and Bonded Labour Welfare; Census	TVK	21 May 2026	163 days
22	V. Gandhiraj		Arakkonam	Co-operation	TVK	21 May 2026	163 days
23	Jegadeshwari. K.		Rajapalayam	Social Welfare including Women Welfare; Orphanages and Correctional Administration and Beggar Homes and Social Reforms & Nutritious Meal Programme	TVK	21 May 2026	163 days
24	R. Vinoth		Kumbakonam	Agriculture, Agricultural Engineering, Agro Service Co-operatives, Horticulture, Sugar, Sugarcane Excise, Sugarcane Development and Waste Land Development	TVK	21 May 2026	163 days
25	C. Vijayalakshmi		Kumarapalayam	Milk and Dairy Development	TVK	21 May 2026	163 days
26	D. Sarathkumar		Tambaram	Human Resources Management & Ex-Servicemen Welfare	TVK	21 May 2026	163 days
27	S. Ramesh		Srirangam	Hindu Religious and Charitable Endowments	TVK	21 May 2026	163 days
28	P. Mathanraja		Ottapidaram	Rural Industries including Cottage Industries, Small Industries	TVK	21 May 2026	163 days
29	N. Marie Wilson		R. K. Nagar	Finance, Pensions and Pensionary Benefits; Planning & Development	TVK	21 May 2026	163 days
30	Srinath		Thoothukkudi	Fisheries, Fisheries Development Corporation	TVK	21 May 2026	163 days
31	S. Kamali		Avanashi	Animal Husbandry	TVK	21 May 2026	163 days
32	R. Kumar		Velachery	Artificial Intelligence, Information Technology and Digital Services	TVK	21 May 2026	163 days
33	R. V. Ranjithkumar		Kancheepuram	Forests	TVK	21 May 2026	163 days
34	Logesh Tamilselvan		Rasipuram	Commercial Taxes, Registration and Stamp Act, Debt Relief including legislation on Money lending, Chits and Registration of Companies	TVK	21 May 2026	163 days
35	Rajeev		Tiruvadanai	Environment, Pollution Control Board, Climate Change	TVK	21 May 2026	163 days

== Legislature ==
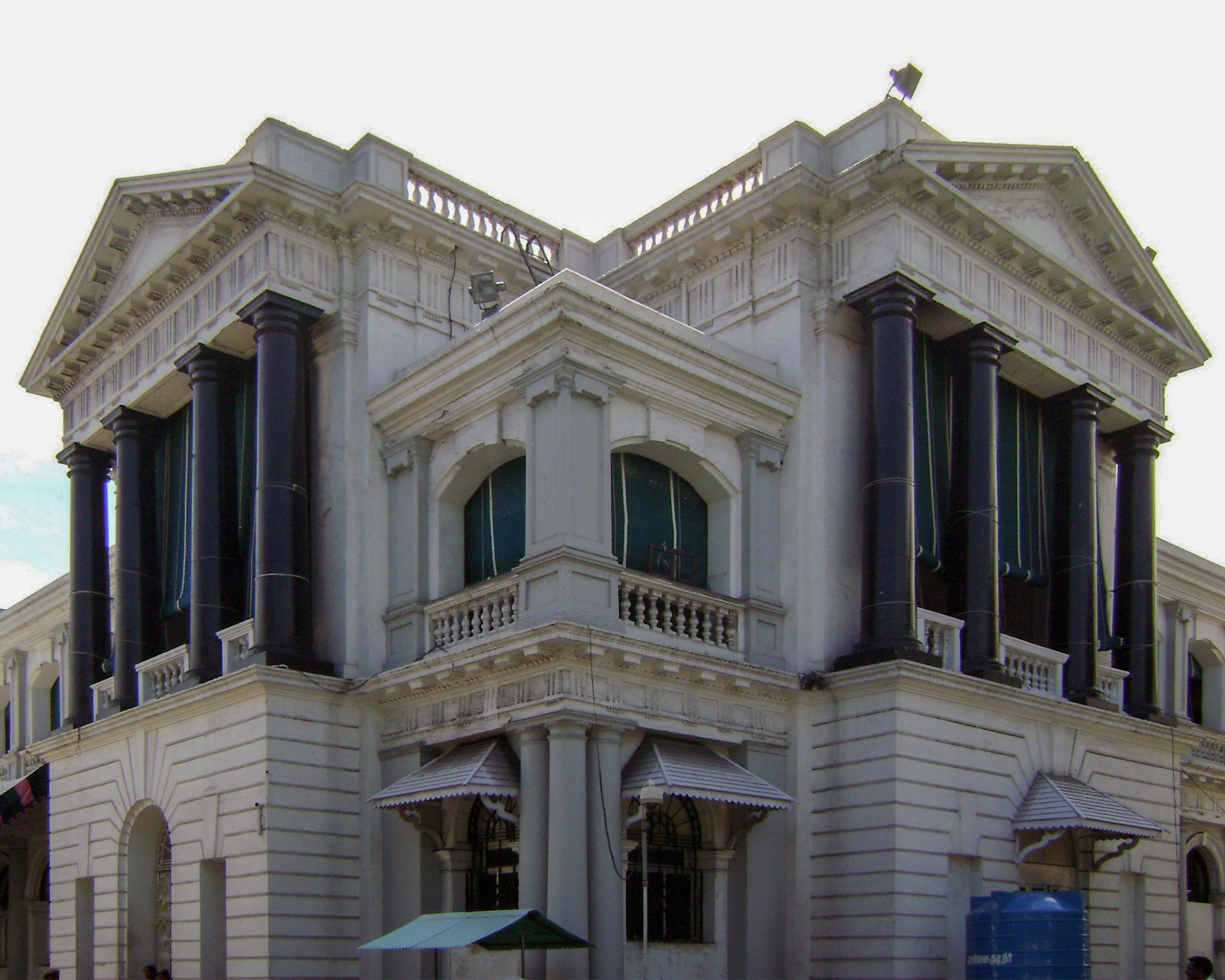
Fort St. George, the seat of the Tamil Nadu Legislative Assembly

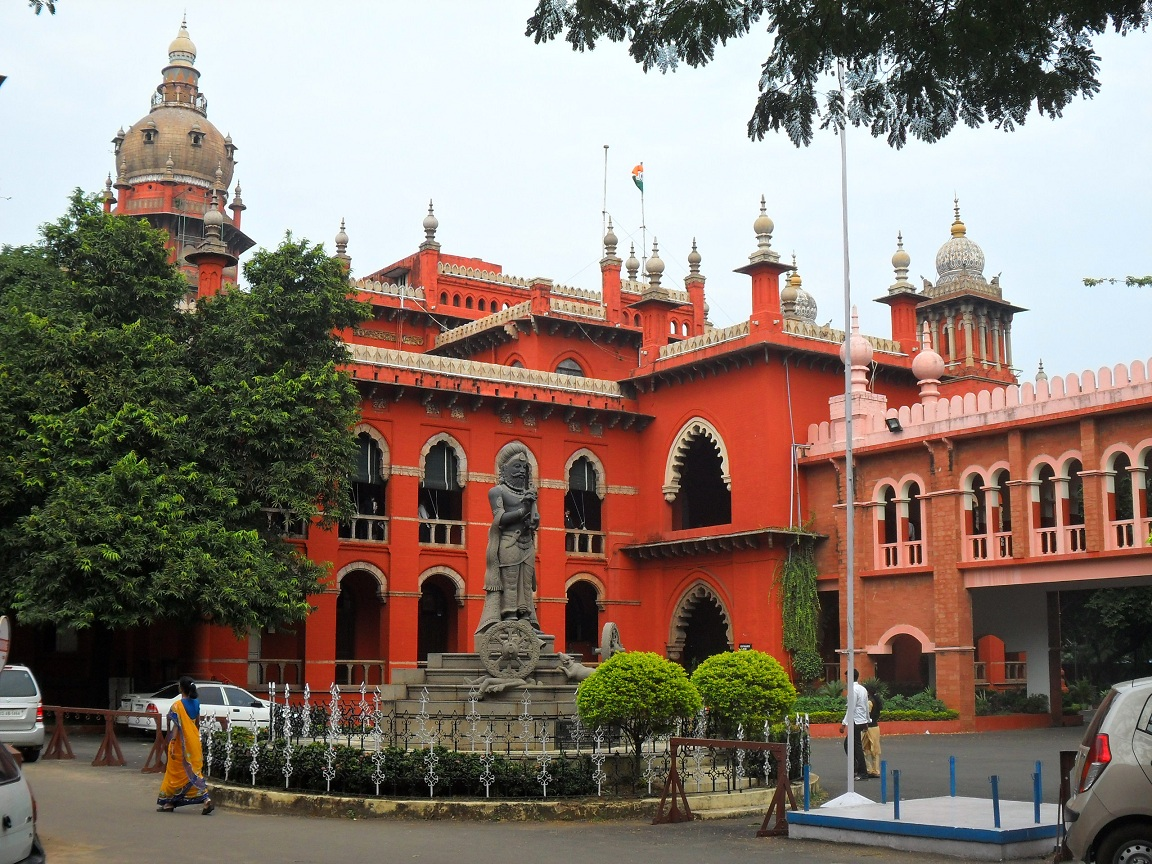
Madras High Court, the highest judicial authority in Tamil Nadu

The Tamil Nadu Legislative Assembly consists of 234 members elected through democratic elections. The current seat of the assembly is at Fort St. George in Chennai. The first election to the assembly on the basis of universal adult suffrage was held in January 1952. The legislature of Tamil Nadu was bicameral until 1986, when it was replaced by a unicameral legislature after the abolishment of Tamil Nadu Legislative Council. Any bill passed by the legislature needs the assent of the governor before becoming an act.

== Judiciary ==
The Madras High Court was established on 26 June 1862 and is the highest judicial authority of the state with control over all the civil and criminal courts in the state. It is headed by a Chief Justice, a position currently held by M. M. Shrivastava. The court is based out of Chennai and has a bench at Madurai since 2004.

== Administrative divisions ==
Districts of Tamil Nadu.

As per the 2011 census, Tamil Nadu is the seventh most populous state in India with a population of 72.1 million. It covers an area of 130,058 km^{2} (50,216 sq mi) and is the tenth largest Indian state by area. The state is divided into 38 districts, each of which is administered by a District Collector, who is an officer of the Indian Administrative Service (IAS) appointed to the district by the Government of Tamil Nadu. For revenue administration, the districts are further subdivided into 87 revenue divisions administered by Revenue Divisional Officers (RDO) which comprise 310 taluks administered by Tahsildars. The taluks are divided into 1,349 revenue blocks called firkas which encompass 17,680 revenue villages.

As of 2024, the local administration consists of 15 municipal corporations, 121 municipalities and 528 town panchayats in the urban and 385 panchayat unions and 12,618 village panchayats, administered by Village Administrative Officers (VAO). Greater Chennai Corporation, established in 1688, is the second oldest in the world and Tamil Nadu was the first state to establish town panchayats as a new administrative unit.

== Departments ==
The administration of the state government functions through various secretariat departments. Each department consists of a secretary to the government, who is the official head of the department with the Chief secretary superintending control over the secretariat and staff. The departments have further sub-divisions which may govern various undertakings and boards. There are 43 departments of the state.

== Insignia ==
The state emblem was designed in 1949 and consists of the Lion Capital of Ashoka without the bell lotus foundation and flanked on either side by an Indian flag with an image of a Gopuram or Hindu temple tower on the background. There are two inscriptions in Tamil language displayed around the rim of the seal runs. தமிழ் நாடு அரசு ('Tamil Nadu arasu') translating to "Government of Tamil Nadu" is inscribed on the top. Inscribed at the bottom is வாய்மையே வெல்லும் ('Vaymaiye Vellum') which translates to "Truth Alone Triumphs" and derived from the words "Satyameva Jayate" in the Indian emblem.

Symbols of Tamil Nadu
Type	Symbol	Image
Animal	Nilgiri tahr (Nilgiritragus hylocrius)	
Bird	Emerald dove (Chalcophaps indica)	
Butterfly	Tamil Yeoman (Cirrochroa thais)	
Flower	Glory lily (Gloriosa superba)	
Fruit	Jackfruit (Artocarpus heterophyllus)	
Tree	Palmyra palm (Borassus flabellifer)	

== See also ==
- List of agencies of the government of Tamil Nadu
- List of government of Tamil Nadu laws and rules
