= Welfare department =

Welfare department may refer to:

- United States Department of Health, Education, and Welfare
- Department of Social Welfare and Development
- Health, Welfare and Food Bureau of Hong Kong
- Pennsylvania Department of Public Welfare, former name of Pennsylvania Department of Human Services
- Department of Welfare of Differently Abled Persons (Tamil Nadu), India

== See also ==
- Welfare (financial aid)
