= List of departments of the government of Tamil Nadu =

The government of Tamil Nadu, the administrative body responsible for the governance of the Indian state of Tamil Nadu, comprises 43 departments. The Governor of Tamil Nadu is the constitutional head of state while the Chief Minister heads the executive branch acting along with the council of ministers. The ministers are responsible for the administration of various departments of the government.

== List ==
There are 43 departments as follows:

- Department of Agriculture
- Department of Animal Husbandry, Dairying and Fisheries
- Department of Artificial Intelligence, Information Technology and Digital Services
- Department of Backward Classes, Most Backward Classes and Minorities Welfare
- Department of Commercial Taxes and Registration
- Department of Co-operation, Food and Consumer Protection
- Department of Energy
- Department of Environment and Forests
- Department of Finance
- Department of Handlooms, Handicrafts, Textiles and Khadi
- Department of Health and Family Welfare
- Department of Higher Education
- Department of Highways and Minor Ports
- Department of Home, Prohibition and Excise
- Department of Housing and Urban Development
- Department of Human Resources Management
- Department of Industries
- Department of Labour and Employment
- Department of Law
- Department of Legislative Assembly
- Department of Micro, Small and Medium Enterprises
- Department of Miscellaneous Officers, Secretariat
- Department of Mudalvarin Mugavari
- Department of Municipal Administration and Water Supply
- Department of Natural Resources
- Department of Other States Government
- Department of Planning, Development and Special Initiatives
- Department of Public
- Department of Public (Elections)
- Department of Public Works
- Department of Revenue and Disaster Management
- Department of Rural Development and Panchayat Raj
- Department of School Education
- Department of Social Justice
- Department of Social Reforms
- Department of Social Welfare and Women Empowerment
- Department of Special Programme Implementation
- Department of Tamil Development and Information
- Department of Tourism, Culture and Religious Endowments
- Department of Transport
- Department of Water Resources
- Department of Welfare of Differently Abled Persons
- Department of Youth Welfare and Sports Development

== See also ==
- Legislature of Tamil Nadu
- List of Tamil Nadu Government Agencies
- Union Government ministries of India
