= Tamil Nadu Magnesite Limited =

Tamil Nadu Magnesite Limited தமிழ் நாடு வெள்ளைக்கல் நிறுவனம்
- Company type: A Government of Tamil Nadu Undertaking
- Industry: Minerals Mining
- Founded: January 1979
- Headquarters: 5/53, Omalur Main Road, Jagir Ammapalayam Post, Salem, Tamil Nadu, India
- Area served: Tamil Nadu
- Key people: Kathiravan, I.A.S. (Chairman and Managing Director)
- Owner: Government of Tamil Nadu
- Website: tanmag.org

Tamil Nadu Magnesite Limited (TANMAG) (Tamil: தமிழ் நாடு வெள்ளைக்கல் நிறுவனம்) is a state-government undertaking of Government of Tamil Nadu located in the Indian state of Tamil Nadu. It is mining & processing magnesite minerals in Salem Region.

Government of Tamilnadu formed TAMILNADU MAGNESITE LIMITED popularly known as TANMAG in January 1979. Company produce Dead Burnt Magnesite, Lightly Calcined Magnesite from raw Magnesite.

Company own captive mine and two factories to produce DBM and LCM of various grades.

== Objectives ==
TANMAG company have various objectives, that are listed below:

1. Usage of mineral wealth for industrial growth
2. Promotion of Socio-economic development
3. Environment protection
4. Maximum usage of mineral for various product

== Process of winning of Raw Magnesite involves ==
1. Selection and preparation of Site
2. Drilling
3. Blasting
4. Picking, dressing, sorting and stacking
5. Removal of reject to spoil bank

== TANMAG Products ==
1. Lightly Calcined Magnesite
2. Dead Burnt Magnesite
3. Dunite
4. Raw Magnesite (Slaty & Dust)
