= K. Sivakumar =

Indian politician

Member of the Tamil Nadu Legislative Assembly
- Incumbent
- Assumed office 4 May 2026
- Preceded by: R. Rajendran
- Constituency: Salem (North)

Personal details
- Born: 1974 (age 51–52)
- Party: Tamilaga Vettri Kazhagam
- Profession: Politician

Kaliyannan Sivakumar (born 1974) is an Indian politician from Tamil Nadu. He is a member of the Tamil Nadu Legislative Assembly from Salem (North) representing Tamilaga Vettri Kazhagam.

== Early life and education ==
Sivakumar is the son of Kaliyannan. He is engaged in real estate business activities. He completed a Master of Business Administration degree from Vinayaka Missions University during 1998–2000.

== Political career ==
Sivakumar won the Salem (North) seat in the 2026 Tamil Nadu Legislative Assembly election as a candidate of Tamilaga Vettri Kazhagam. He received 85,710 votes and defeated R. Rajendran of the Dravida Munnetra Kazhagam by a margin of 14,034 votes.
