= T. K. Prabhu =

Indian politician and dentist (born 1985)

Dr. T. K. Prabhu

Cabinet Minister Government of Tamil Nadu
- Incumbent
- Assumed office 10 May 2026
- Minister: Natural Resources
- Chief Minister: C. Joseph Vijay

Member of the Tamil Nadu Legislative Assembly
- Incumbent
- Assumed office 4 May 2026
- Preceded by: S. Mangudi (INC)
- Constituency: Karaikudi

Secretary, Tamilaga Vettri Kazhagam
- Incumbent
- Assumed office 2025
- President: Vijay

Personal details
- Born: 1985 (age 40–41) Karaikudi, Tamil Nadu, India
- Party: Tamilaga Vettri Kazhagam (2025–present)
- Spouse: Amritha Dora Prabhu
- Children: 2
- Parent: Thurai Karunanidhi (father)
- Education: Bachelor of Dental Surgery (BDS); Master of Dental Surgery (MDS); Master of Science (MSc); Fellowship (FICOI); Fellowship (ICDI)
- Alma mater: Goethe University, Germany (MSc, 2022)
- Profession: Dentist

Thurai Karunanidhi Prabhu (born 1985) is an Indian politician and dentist from Tamil Nadu. He was elected as Member of the Legislative Assembly (MLA) for the Karaikudi constituency in the 2026 Tamil Nadu Legislative Assembly election. He is a member of Tamilaga Vettri Kazhagam (TVK) and serves as party secretary for Sivaganga East District.

== Early life and education ==
Prabhu was born in 1985 in Karaikudi, Sivaganga district. His father is Thurai Karunanidhi.

He holds a Bachelor of Dental Surgery (BDS) and Master of Dental Surgery (MDS) degree. In 2019, he received FICOI fellowship certification in Colombo, Sri Lanka. He also completed Master of Science (MSc) at Goethe University in Germany in 2022, and also holds an ICDI fellowship.

== Career ==
=== Dentistry ===
Prabhu practices dentistry specialising on dental implantology. He runs Prabu Dental, a clinic at Door No. 13, Mudiarasan Salai, Karaikudi.

=== Politics ===
Prabhu joined Tamilaga Vettri Kazhagam in 2025, a party founded by actor Vijay. He was appointed secretary for Sivaganga East District.

In the 2026 Tamil Nadu Legislative Assembly election, Prabhu was nominated as TVK's candidate for Karaikudi Assembly constituency. He won with 101,358 votes, defeating incumbent INC MLA S. Mangudi, who received 55,284 votes, with a winning margin of 46,074 votes. Other candidates include Seeman from Naam Tamilar Katchi and Therpoki V. Pandi from Amma Makkal Munnetra Kazhagam.

2026 Tamil Nadu Legislative Assembly election: Karaikudi
Party	Candidate	Votes	%	±%
TVK	T. K. Prabhu	101,358		
INC	S. Mangudi	55,284		
NTK	Seeman			
AMMK	Therpoki V. Pandi			
Majority		46,074		
