= K. Vignesh =

Indian politician

Cabinet Minister Government of Tamil Nadu
- Incumbent
- Assumed office 21 May 2026
- Governor: Rajendra Arlekar
- Chief Minister: C. Joseph Vijay
- Ministry and Departments: Minister of Prohibition and Excise

Member of the Tamil Nadu Legislative Assembly
- Incumbent
- Assumed office 4 May 2026
- Preceded by: S. Damodaran
- Constituency: Kinathukadavu

Personal details
- Party: Tamilaga Vettri Kazhagam (since 2024)
- Profession: Politician

K. Vignesh is an Indian politician from Tamil Nadu. He is a member of the Tamil Nadu Legislative Assembly from Kinathukadavu representing Tamilaga Vettri Kazhagam.

== Political career ==
Vignesh won the Kinathukadavu constituency in the 2026 Tamil Nadu Legislative Assembly election as a candidate of Tamilaga Vettri Kazhagam. He received 99,950 votes and defeated K. V. K. S. Sabari Karthikeyan of the Dravida Munnetra Kazhagam by a margin of 11,710 votes.
