= Vijay Tamilan Parthiban =

Indian politician

Minister for Transport Government of Tamil Nadu
- Incumbent
- Assumed office 21 May 2026
- Governor: Rajendra Arlekar
- Chief Minister: C. Joseph Vijay
- Ministry and Departments: Transportation

Member of the Tamil Nadu Legislative Assembly
- Incumbent
- Assumed office 4 May 2026
- Preceded by: E. Balasubramanian
- Constituency: Salem (South)

Personal details
- Born: 1976 (age 49–50)
- Party: Tamilaga Vettri Kazhagam
- Profession: Politician

Vijay Tamilan Parthiban is an Indian politician and a former actor from Tamil Nadu. He is a member of the Tamil Nadu Legislative Assembly from Salem (South) representing Tamilaga Vettri Kazhagam. He was appointed as the minister for Transport Department of Tamil Nadu in the C. Joseph Vijay ministry.

== Early life and education ==
Parthiban is the son of Arumugam. He had a mobile shop named Tamilan Mobiles, where he sold mobiles and CDs, DVD's in the past. He completed Higher Secondary education at Municipality Boys Higher Secondary School, Ammapettai, Salem, during the 1993–1994 academic year. He played cameo roles in Singam 3 and Vijay films from Leo to Jana Nayagan.

== Political career ==
Parthiban won the Salem (South) seat in the 2026 Tamil Nadu Legislative Assembly election as a candidate of Tamilaga Vettri Kazhagam. He received 91,371 votes and defeated M. Loganathan of the Dravida Munnetra Kazhagam by a margin of 33,369 votes.
