= S. Ramesh (TVK politician) =

Indian politician (born 1994)

Cabinet Minister Government of Tamil Nadu
- Incumbent
- Assumed office 21 May 2026
- Minister: Hindu Religious and Charitable Endowments
- Governor: R. V. Arlekar
- Chief Minister: C. Joseph Vijay
- Preceded by: P. K. Sekar Babu

Member of the Tamil Nadu Legislative Assembly
- Incumbent
- Assumed office 7 May 2026
- Chief Minister: C. Joseph Vijay
- Preceded by: M. Palaniyandi
- Constituency: Srirangam

Personal details
- Party: Tamilaga Vettri Kazhagam
- Parent: Srinivasan (father)
- Education: ARM College of Engineering and Technology, Maraimalai Nagar, Chengalpattu

Srinivasan Ramesh (born 1994) is an Indian politician from Tamil Nadu. He is from the Tamil Nadu Legislative Assembly from Srirangam Assembly constituency in Tiruchirapalli district, as well as the current Minister for Hindu Religious and Charitable Endowments Department in Government of Tamil Nadu, representing Tamilaga Vettri Kazhagam.

== Early life and education ==
Ramesh is resident of Maraimalai Nagar, Chengalpattu, Tamil Nadu. He is the son of Srinivasan. He hails from a Tamil Thenkalai Iyengar Brahmin Family. He pursued his graduation from ARM College of Engineering & Technology, Maramalai Nagar in the year 2017.

== Political career ==
Ramesh was associated with actor Vijay's fan club Thalapathy Vijay Makkal Iyakkam, long before the launch of the actor's Tamilaga Vettri Kazhagam political party. He led grassroots-level mobilisation of youth cadre, constituency engagement and political communication.

Ramesh was elected as MLA from Srirangam Assembly constituency in 2026 Tamil Nadu Legislative Assembly election representing Tamilaga Vettri Kazhagam. He is the one among the two candidates from Brahmin community fielded by TVK party, with the other candidate P. Venkataramanan from Mylapore constituency.

He polled 1,03,235 votes and defeated his opponent, S. Durairaj of the Dravida Munnetra Kazhagam, by a margin of 33,590 votes.

On 21 May 2026, Ramesh was appointed as Minister for Hindu Religious and Charitable Endowments Department in Government of Tamil Nadu, as a part of TVK led government's cabinet expansion.

== Electoral performance ==
2026 Tamil Nadu Legislative Assembly election: Srirangam
Party	Candidate	Votes	%	±%
TVK	S. Ramesh	103,235	40.49	New
DMK	S. Durairaj	69,645	27.31	▼20.58
AIADMK	R. Manoharan	65,819	25.81	▼13.71
NTK	Dharmaraj M.	11,026	4.32	▼3.21
NOTA	None of the above	929	0.36	▼0.66
Margin of victory		33,590	13.18	▲4.81
Turnout		2,54,985	88.78	▲12.49
Registered electors		2,87,214		
TVK gain from DMK		Swing	▲40.49	
