= M. Jayakumar =

Indian art director, artist, and writer

M. Jayakumar, aka JK
- Born: 1 January 1970 (age 56); Kerala, India
- Occupations: Art Director; Artist; Writer
- Years active: 1970-present

M. Jayakumar aka JK is an eminent Indian art director, writer, and artist. Some of his works in Tamil cinema include Mahanadhi and Manmadhan Ambu. He has received numerous accolades, including the Kalaimamani award for the year 2021 from the Government of Tamil Nadu.
