= Rajeev (politician) =

Indian politician

Cabinet Minister Government of Tamil Nadu
- Incumbent
- Assumed office 21 May 2026
- Governor: Rajendra Arlekar
- Chief Minister: C. Joseph Vijay
- Ministry and Departments: Environment Pollution Control Board Climate Change

Member of the Tamil Nadu Legislative Assembly
- Incumbent
- Assumed office 4 May 2026
- Preceded by: Karumanickam
- Constituency: Tiruvadanai

Personal details
- Party: Tamilaga Vettri Kazhagam
- Profession: Politician

Rajeev is an Indian politician from Tamil Nadu. He is a member of the Tamil Nadu Legislative Assembly from Tiruvadanai representing Tamilaga Vettri Kazhagam.

== Political career ==
Rajeev won the Tiruvadanai seat in the 2026 Tamil Nadu Legislative Assembly election as a candidate of Tamilaga Vettri Kazhagam. He received 69,551 votes and defeated R. M. Karumanikam of the Indian National Congress by a margin of 2,513 votes.
