= A. M. Shahjahan =

Indian politician

Minister for Minorities Welfare & Waqf Board Government of Tamil Nadu
- Incumbent
- Assumed office 22 May 2026
- Governor: Rajendra Arlekar
- Chief Minister: C. Joseph Vijay
- Ministry and Departments: Minority Affairs

Member of the Tamil Nadu Legislative Assembly
- Incumbent
- Assumed office 4 May 2026
- Preceded by: M. H. Jawahirullah
- Constituency: Papanasam

Personal details
- Party: Indian Union Muslim League
- Profession: Politician

A. M. Shahjahan is an Indian politician from Tamil Nadu. He is a member of the Tamil Nadu Legislative Assembly from Papanasam representing the Indian Union Muslim League.

== Political career ==
Shahjahan won the Papanasam seat in the 2026 Tamil Nadu Legislative Assembly election as a candidate of the Indian Union Muslim League. He received 69,284 votes and defeated Azarudeen Uduman Ali of Tamilaga Vettri Kazhagam by a margin of 1,065 votes.

Shahjahan was made Minister of Minority Welfare in CM Vijay's government.
