= M. Vijay Balaji =

Indian politician

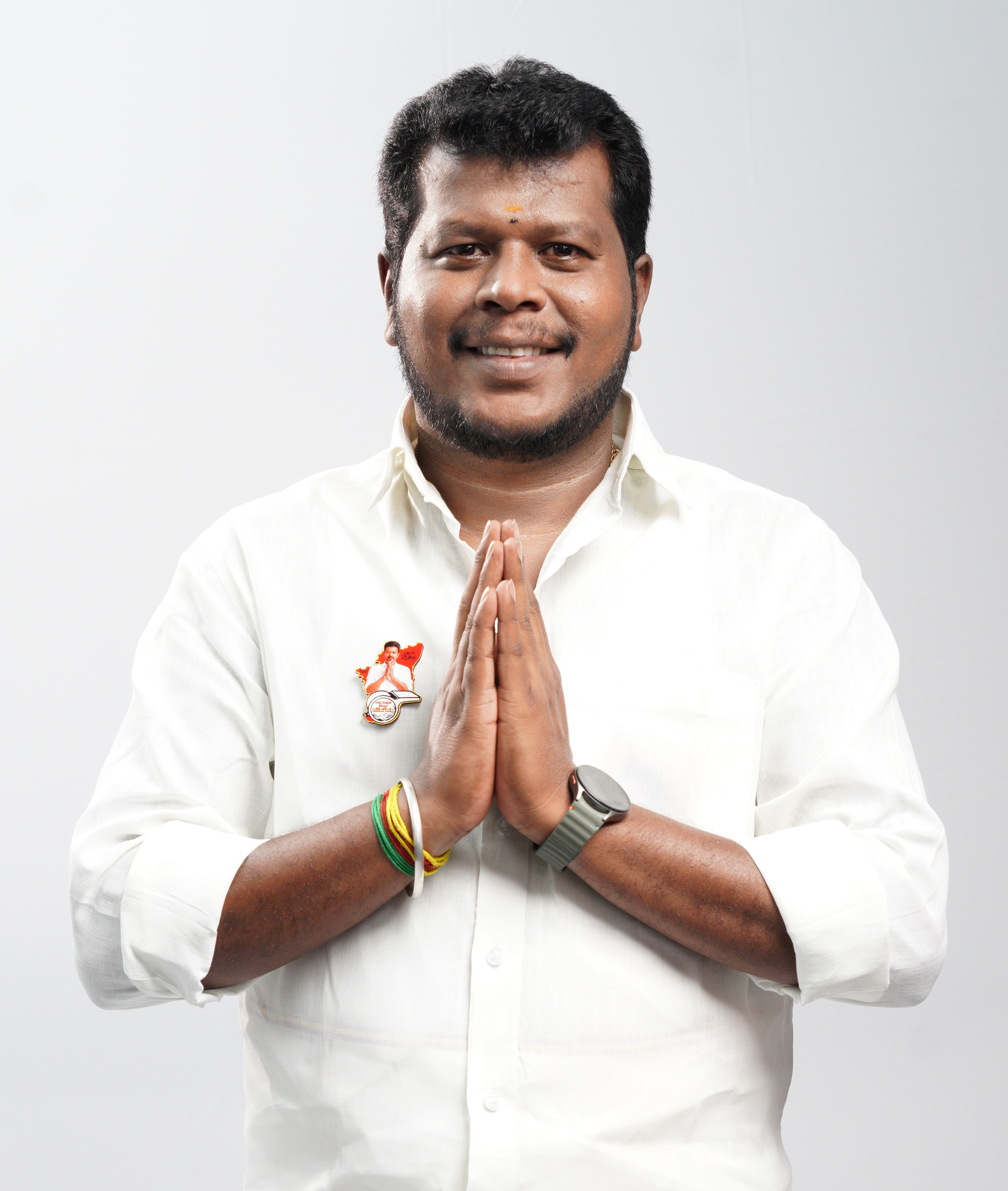

Cabinet Minister Government of Tamil Nadu
- Incumbent
- Assumed office 21 May 2026
- Governor: Rajendra Arlekar
- Chief Minister: C. Joseph Vijay
- Ministry and Departments: TBD

Member of the Tamil Nadu Legislative Assembly
- Incumbent
- Assumed office 4 May 2026
- Preceded by: V. C. Chandhirakumar
- Constituency: Erode East

Personal details
- Born: 27 June 1986 (age 40) Karungalpalayam, Erode, Tamil Nadu, India
- Party: Tamilaga Vettri Kazhagam
- Spouse: Tanya
- Children: Darshan (son); Maitra (daughter)
- Education: Dr. G.R. Damodaran College of Science
- Occupation: Politician

Mathiyalagan Vijay Balaji is an Indian politician from Tamil Nadu. He was elected as Member of the Legislative Assembly (MLA) for the Erode East in the 2026 Tamil Nadu Legislative Assembly election. He is a member of Tamilaga Vettri Kazhagam (TVK) and serves as party secretary for Erode City District.

== Early and personal life ==
Vijay Balaji was born in a Telugu-speaking Gavara Naidu family on 27 June 1986 in Erode, Tamil Nadu, India. His father’s name is Mathiyalagan, and his mother’s name is Mateshwari. He earned a Bachelor of Commerce degree.

Vijay Balaji married Tanya. They have two children: a son (Darshan) and a daughter (Maitra).

== Political career ==
Vijay Balaji won the Erode East seat in the 2026 Tamil Nadu Legislative Assembly election as a candidate of Tamilaga Vettri Kazhagam. He received 69,747 votes and defeated Gopinath Palaniyappan of the Indian National Congress by a margin of 23,966 votes.

== Elections Contested and Results ==
Elections	Constituency	Result	Vote %	Opposition Candidate	Opposition Party	Opposition vote %
2026	Erode East	Won	42.93%	Gopinath Palaniyappan	INC	28.18%
