= C. Vijayalakshmi =

Indian politician

Cabinet Minister Government of Tamil Nadu
- Incumbent
- Assumed office 10 May 2026
- Governor: R. V. Arlekar
- Chief Minister: C. Joseph Vijay
- Ministry and Departments: Milk and Dairy Development
- Preceded by: Mano Thangaraj

Member of the Tamil Nadu Legislative Assembly
- Incumbent
- Assumed office 10 May 2026
- Chief Minister: C. Joseph Vijay
- Preceded by: P. Thangamani
- Constituency: Kumarapalyam

Personal details
- Party: Tamilaga Vettri Kazhagam

C. Vijayalakshmi (born 1976) is an Indian politician from Tamil Nadu. She is a member of the Tamil Nadu Legislative Assembly from Kumarapalayam in Namakkal district representing Tamilaga Vettri Kazhagam.

Vijayalakshmi is from Namakkal district, Tamil Nadu. She studied till Class 12. She declared assets worth Rs.97 lakhs in her affidavit to the Election Commission of India.

Vijayalakshmi became an MLA for the first time winning the debut 2026 Tamil Nadu Legislative Assembly election from Kumarapalayam Assembly constituency representing Tamilaga Vettri Kazhagam. She polled 81,179 votes and defeated her nearest rival, P. Thangamani of the All India Anna Dravida Munnetra Kazhagam, by a margin of 7,696 votes.
