= D. Sarathkumar =

Indian politician (born 1992)

Cabinet Minister Government of Tamil Nadu
- Incumbent
- Assumed office 21 May 2026
- Minister: Human Resources Management
- Governor: R. V. Arlekar
- Chief Minister: C. Joseph Vijay
- Preceded by: N. Kayalvizhi

Member of the Tamil Nadu Legislative Assembly
- Incumbent
- Assumed office 10 May 2026
- Preceded by: S. R. Raja
- Constituency: Tambaram

Personal details
- Party: Tamilaga Vettri Kazhagam
- Parent: Dhanasekaran (father)
- Education: M. M. Jain College (B.B.A)
- Nickname: Ghilli Sarath

Dhanasekaran Sarathkumar (born 1992), also known as Ghilli Sarath, is an Indian politician from Tamil Nadu. He is serving as a Cabinet Minister in the Government of Tamil Nadu, holding the portfolio of Human Resources Management. He is also an elected member of the Tamil Nadu Legislative Assembly from Tambaram Assembly constituency in Chengalpattu district, representing Tamilaga Vettri Kazhagam.

Sarathkumar is from Tambaram, Chengalpattu district. He declared assets worth Rs.4.1 crore in his affidavit to the Election Commission of India.

== Electoral performance ==
Sarathkumar became an MLA for the first time making a winning debut in the 2026 Tamil Nadu Legislative Assembly election from Tambaram Assembly constituency representing Tamilaga Vettri Kazhagam. He polled 1,18,967 votes and defeated his nearest rival, R. S. Krithika Devi of the Dravida Munnetra Kazhagam, by a margin of 35,621 votes.

2026 Tamil Nadu Legislative Assembly election: Tambaram
Party	Candidate	Votes	%	±%
TVK	Sarathkumar	118,967	42.67	New
DMK	R. S. Kiruthika Devi	83,346	29.89	▼17.04
AIADMK	C. Rajendran	61,991	22.23	▼9.91
NTK	S. Tamilchelvi	11,627	4.17	▼3.66
NOTA	NOTA	1,512	0.54	▼0.38
Margin of victory		35,621	12.78	▼2.01
Turnout		2,78,809	84.44	▲24.52
Registered electors		3,30,181		▼85,306
TVK gain from DMK		Swing	▲42.67	
