= Department of Water Resources (Tamil Nadu) =

Government department of Tamil Nadu state, India

Agency overview
- Formed: 2021
- Jurisdiction: Tamil Nadu
- Headquarters: Chennai
- Minister responsible: N. Anand, Minister of Water Resources Department
- Agency executive: Sandeep Saxena, IAS, Additional Chief Secretary, Water Resources
- Parent agency: Government of Tamil Nadu
- Website: https://wrd.tn.gov.in

The Department of Water Resources is one of the departments of Government of Tamil Nadu.

The department was split from the Public works department in June 2021 and is responsible for the management and conservation of water bodies in the state.

== See also ==
- Government of Tamil Nadu
- Tamil Nadu Government's Departments
