= Department of Natural Resources (Tamil Nadu) =

Government department of Tamil Nadu state, India

Agency overview
- Formed: 2022
- Jurisdiction: Tamil Nadu
- Headquarters: Chennai
- Minister responsible: T. K. Prabhu, Minister of Natural Resources Department
- Agency executive: K. Phanindra Reddy, IAS, Additional Chief Secretary, Natural Resources Management
- Parent agency: Government of Tamil Nadu
- Website: Natural Resources Department

The Department of Natural Resources is one of the departments of Government of Tamil Nadu.

== History ==
The directorate of Natural Resources Management was established in 2010 as a part of the industries department. It was separated into a stand-alone department in January 2022.

== Objective ==
The department is responsible for the management of mines and minerals.

== Sub-divisions ==
The department of geology and mining function under the purview of the department and includes the following bodies:

- Tamil Nadu Magnesite Limited (TANMAG)
- Tamil Nadu Minerals Limited (TAMIN)

== See also ==
- Government of Tamil Nadu
- Tamil Nadu Government's Departments
