= R. Kumar =

Indian politician (born 1966)

Dr R. Kumar

Minister for Artificial Intelligence, Information Technology and Digital Services, Government of Tamil Nadu
- Incumbent
- Assumed office 21 May 2026
- Governor: Rajendra Vishwanath Arlekar
- Chief Minister: C. Joseph Vijay
- Departments: Artificial Intelligence, Information Technology and Digital Services
- Preceded by: Palanivel Thiaga Rajan

Member of the Tamil Nadu Legislative Assembly
- Incumbent
- Assumed office 11 May 2026
- Preceded by: J. M. H. Aassan Maulaana
- Constituency: Velachery

Personal details
- Party: Tamilaga Vettri Kazhagam

Dr. Ram Kumar (born 1965) is an Indian politician from Tamil Nadu. He is a member of the Tamil Nadu Legislative Assembly from the Velachery Assembly constituency in Chennai district, representing the Tamilaga Vettri Kazhagam. He was inducted into the Vijay ministry as Minister for Artificial Intelligence, Information Technology and Digital Services, a dedicated ministry created for AI for the first time in Tamil Nadu.

== Early life ==
Kumar is from Velachery, Chennai district, Tamil Nadu. He is the son of Ram Tula. He completed his Bachelor of Engineering in civil at University of Madras in 1989. Later, he did Business Leadership Programme at Indian Institute of Management (IIM), Bengaluru in 2024. He and his wife run the family business, Creations Concrete Prefab products and a Creations Charitable Trust. He declared assets worth Rs.117 crore in his affidavit to the Election Commission of India. He had no criminal cases registered against him as of May 2026.

== Career ==
Kumar became an MLA for the first time winning the Velachery Assembly constituency representing the Tamilaga Vettri Kazhagam in the 2026 Tamil Nadu Legislative Assembly election. He polled 80,430 votes and defeated his nearest rival and former MLA, M. K. Ashok of the All India Anna Dravida Munnetra Kazhagam, by a margin of 33,305 votes.
