= Department of Human Resources Management (Tamil Nadu) =

Government department of Tamil Nadu state, India

Agency overview
- Formed: 1976
- Jurisdiction: Tamil Nadu
- Headquarters: Chennai
- Minister responsible: D. Sarathkumar, Minister of Human Resources Management Department, Ex Serviceman welfare
- Agency executive: K. Nanthakumar, IAS, Secretary, Human Resources Management
- Parent agency: Government of Tamil Nadu
- Website: Human Resources Management Department

The Department of Human Resources Management is one of the departments of Government of Tamil Nadu.

== History ==
The Personnel and Administrative Reforms department was carved out in 1976 from the Public Department. In 2021, the department was renamed as Human Resources Management department.

== Objective ==
The main objective of the department is recruitment, training and development of human resource. It ensures rules and regulations are adhered to in the administration of all government departments, maintain uniformity and standards, training of requisite personnel.

== Sub-divisions ==
The following bodies function under the purview of the department:

- Tamil Nadu Public Service Commission (TNPSC)
- Tamil Nadu Information Commission (TNIC)
- State Vigilance Commission (SVC)
- Directorate of Vigilance and Anti-Corruption (DVAC)

== See also ==
- Government of Tamil Nadu
- Tamil Nadu Government's Departments
