= Department of Public Elections (Tamil Nadu) =

Government department of Tamil Nadu state, India

Agency overview
- Jurisdiction: Tamil Nadu
- Headquarters: Chennai
- Minister responsible: C. T. R. Nirmal Kumar, Minister of Elections Department
- Parent agency: Government of Tamil Nadu
- Website: Public Elections Department

The Department of Public Elections is one of the departments of Government of Tamil Nadu.

== Objective and functions ==
The department is responsible for enabling the conduction of free and fair elections in coordination with the Election Commission of India and its entities. The department is responsible for infrastructure for storage of Electronic Voting Machines, maintaining IT infrastructure for elections, electoral roll maintenance and issue of voter identity cards, voter awareness and appointment of poll observers and officers as directed by Election Commission.

== See also ==
- Government of Tamil Nadu
- Tamil Nadu Government's Departments
