= Department of Public (Tamil Nadu) =

Government department of Tamil Nadu state, India

Agency overview
- Jurisdiction: Tamil Nadu
- Headquarters: Chennai
- Minister responsible: C. Joseph Vijay, Minister of Public Department
- Agency executive: K. Nantha Kumar, IAS, Additional Chief Secretary, Public Management
- Parent agency: Government of Tamil Nadu
- Website: Public Department

The Department of Public is one of the departments of Government of Tamil Nadu.

== Objective and functions ==
The department functions under the direct control of the Chief secretary and deals with essential matters concerning the administration of the state. It is responsible for the following: functioning of Governor's household, appointment of ministers, establishment of office of chief minister and ministers, arrangements for cabinet meetings, protocol and arrangements for visits of VVIPs, managing aviation wing of the government, liaison between Government of India and state government, liaison with Ministry of External Affairs and foreign consulates, postings of IAS officers, constitution of commissions of inquiry, human rights, administration of government guest houses, welfare of ex-servicemen, freedom fighters welfare, relief to Sri Lankan Tamils, welfare of non-resident Tamils, declaration of public holidays, population census, Management of Chief Minister's special cell, arrangements for the celebration of national functions, recommendations to Government of India for awards, permission for entry and exit to foreign nationals.

== Sub-divisions ==
The following bodies function under the purview of the department:

- Tamil Nadu State Human Rights Commission (TNSHRC): Established in 1996 under the Protection of Human Rights Act, 1993 and responsible for safeguarding the basic human rights of the citizens in the state.
- Tamil Nadu Ex-Servicemen's Corporation (TEXCO): Established in 1986 and responsible for the welfare and assistance for rehabilitation of Ex-servicemen from the state.
- Non-Resident Tamils Welfare Board (NRTWB): Established in 2022 and responsible for resolving grievances of Tamil people abroad.
- Overseas Manpower Corporation (OMCL): Established in 1978 with the objective of enabling and promoting employment of manpower from the state in foreign countries.

== See also ==
- Government of Tamil Nadu
- Tamil Nadu Government's Departments
