= J. Mohamed Farvas =

Indian politician (born 1995)

J. Mohamed Farvas (born 1995) is an Indian politician from Tamil Nadu. He is a member of the Tamil Nadu Legislative Assembly from the Aranthangi Assembly constituency in Pudukkottai district representing the Tamilaga Vettri Kazhagam.

Farvas is from Pudukottai, Tamil Nadu. He is the son of M Jafer Ali. He graduated his undergraduate law degree B.A.LL.B. (Hons.) from Tamil Nadu National Law University in 2022. He runs his own printing business. He declared assets worth Rs.9 crore in his affidavit to the Election Commission of India.

== Career ==
Farvas won the Aranthangi Assembly constituency representing the Tamilaga Vettri Kazhagam in the 2026 Tamil Nadu Legislative Assembly election. He polled 73,244 votes and defeated his nearest rival, T. Ramachandran of the Indian National Congress, by a margin of 10,062 votes. Earlier, he served as a councillor of Pudukottai Corporation.

== Electoral performance ==
Election	Constituency	Political party	Result	Vote %	Opposition			Ref
Election	Constituency	Political party	Result	Vote %	Candidate	Political party	Vote %	Ref
2026	Aranthangi	TVK	Won	40.08%	T. Ramachandran	INC	34.58%	-
