= Department of Tourism, Culture and Religious Endowments =

Government department of Tamil Nadu state, India

Department of Tourism, Culture and Religious Endowments (Tamil Nadu)

Agency overview
- Formed: 1951
- Jurisdiction: Tamil Nadu
- Headquarters: Chennai
- Ministers responsible: S. Rajeshkumar, Minister of Tourism; Thiru.Ramesh, Minister of Culture and Religious Endowments Department
- Agency executive: K. Manivasan, IAS, Additional Chief Secretary, Tourism, Culture and Religious Endowments
- Parent agency: Government of Tamil Nadu
- Website: Tourism, Culture and Religious Endowments Department

The Department of Tourism, Culture and Religious Endowments is one of the departments of Government of Tamil Nadu. The department has two major sub-departments, tourism and Hindu religious endowments.

== Religious endowments ==
The state famed for Tamil architecture styled Hindu temples, culture and tradition and commonly known as the Land of Temples. There are more than 34,000 temples in Tamil Nadu built across various periods including some of the largest and oldest temples in the world. The department was established by the Madras Hindu Religious and Charitable Endowments Act of 1951 and is responsible for the maintenance, promotion and consecration of temples and mutts under its supervision.

== Tourism ==
The tourism wing is responsible for the promotion of tourism and development of tourist related infrastructure in the state. In 1971, Tamil Nadu Tourism Development Corporation was established as a nodal agency responsible for the same. The tag line "Enchanting Tamil Nadu" has been adopted in the tourism promotions by the department. In the 21st century, the state has been among the top destinations for domestic and international tourists. As of 2021, Tamil Nadu recorded the most tourist foot-falls.

== See also ==
- Government of Tamil Nadu
- Tamil Nadu Government's Departments
- Hindu Religious Institutions and Charitable Endowments Department (Karnataka)
