= Department of School Education (Tamil Nadu) =

Government department of Tamil Nadu state, India

Agency overview
- Jurisdiction: Tamil Nadu
- Headquarters: Chennai
- Minister responsible: A. Rajmohan, Minister of School Education Department
- Agency executive: Dr. P. Senthil Kumar, IAS, Secretary, School Education
- Parent agency: Government of Tamil Nadu
- Website: School Education Department

The Department of School Education is one of the departments of Government of Tamil Nadu.

== Objective ==
The department is responsible for the management of elementary, primary and secondary education in the state.

== Right to education ==
School education starts with two years of Kindergarten from age three onward and then follows the Indian 10+2 plan, ten years of school and two years of higher secondary education. As per the Right of Children to Free and Compulsory Education Act, 2009 of Government of India, free education is to be guaranteed to all children between the age of 6 to 14 years in accordance with Article 21A of the Indian Constitution. Sarva Shiksha Abhiyan programme was launched to ensure the same with the school education department responsible for the implementation in the state.

== School education ==
The directorate of school education is responsible for the management of public schools in the state. As of October 2021, the state had over 37,211 government schools and 8,403 government-aided schools which educate 54.71 lakh and 28.44 lakh students respectively. Public schools are all affiliated with the Tamil Nadu State Board, the curriculum for which is framed by the department. The directorate is also responsible for financial assistance and the distribution of welfare schemes for school students.

== Private schools ==
The directorate of private schools was established in January 2023. Private schools may be affiliated with either of Tamil Nadu Board of Secondary Education, Central Board of Secondary Education (CBSE), Council for the Indian School Certificate Examinations (ICSE) or National Institute of Open Schooling (NIOS). As of 2023, there are 12,631 private schools with 56.9 lakh students. The directorate regulates the registration of private schools and determines the fee structure.

== State council of educational research and training ==
State Council of Educational Research and Training (SCERT) is the nodal body managed by the department that is responsible for ensuring the quality of school education and provides inputs to the directorate of school education on curriculum and text books.

== Government exams ==
The directorate of government examinations was established in 1975 and is responsible for conducting the state board examinations for SSLC (Class 10) and Higher Secondary (Class 11 and 12).

== Teachers and training ==
As of 2022, there were 3,12,683 teachers in government and aided schools with an average teacher-pupil ratio of 1:26.6. The teachers recruitment board was established in 1987 and is responsible for recruitment and training of teachers.

== Adult education ==
Adult education is aimed at educating adults who do not have had formal schooling to enable them to learn basic reading and writing knowledge and skills. The department is responsible for adult education programme and runs adult learning centers in the state.

== Public libraries ==
The directorate of public libraries is responsible to set-up and manage the administration of public libraries in the state. As of 2023, the state has 4622 public libraries. Established in 1896, Connemara Public Library is one of the oldest and is amongst the four National Depository Centres in India that receive a copy of all newspapers and books published in the country and the Anna Centenary Library is the largest library in Asia.

== See also ==
- Government of Tamil Nadu
- Tamil Nadu Government's Departments
