= Thennarasu K. =

Indian politician (born 1990)

Thennarasu K. (born 1990) is an Indian politician from Tamil Nadu. He is a member of the Tamil Nadu Legislative Assembly from Sriperumbudur Assembly constituency which is reserved for Scheduled Caste community in Kanchipuram district representing Tamilaga Vettri Kazhagam.

Thennarasu is from Kanchipuram, Tamil Nadu. He is the son of Kanniyappan. He runs his own business as a commission agent. He studied at Government Higher Secondary School, Thiruputkuzhi but discontinued before completing Class 10 in 2005. He declared assets worth Rs.52 lakhs in his affidavit to the Election Commission of India.

Thennarasu became an MLA for the first time winning the 2026 Tamil Nadu Legislative Assembly election from Sriperumbudur Assembly constituency representing Tamilaga Vettri Kazhagam. He polled 1,47,611 votes and defeated his nearest rival and sitting MLA, K. Selvaperunthagai of the Indian National Congress, by a margin of 54,246 votes.
