= Department of Rural Development and Panchayat Raj (Tamil Nadu) =

Government department of Tamil Nadu state, India

Agency overview
- Jurisdiction: Tamil Nadu
- Headquarters: Chennai
- Minister responsible: N. Anand, Minister of Rural Development and Panchayat Raj Department
- Agency executive: Thiru Gagandeep Singh Bedi,IAS, Principal secretary, Rural Development and Panchayat Raj
- Parent agency: Government of Tamil Nadu
- Website: Rural Development and Panchayat Raj Department

The Department of Rural Development and Panchayat Raj is one of the departments of Government of Tamil Nadu.

== Objective ==
The local administration of the state consists of municipal corporations, municipalities and town panchayats in the urban and panchayat unions and village panchayats in the rural, administered by village administrative officers (VAO). The department is responsible for the implementation of rural development and welfare schemes and facilitates Panchayat administration in the rural. The department is responsible for implementing programmes to reach the localisation sustainable development goals by 2030 as laid down by United Nations.

== Units ==
Tamil Nadu State Institute of Rural Development (SIRD) and Tamil Nadu Corporation for Development of Women (TNCDW) function under the department and are involved in the training of administrative officers and implementation of social schemes for women in rural areas respectively.

== Ministers ==
- N. Anand (2026-Incumbent)
- I. Periyasamy (2021–2026)
- S. P. Velumani (2016–21)
- K. P. Munusamy (2012–16)
- P. Mohan (2011–12)
- M.K.Stalin (2006–11)

== See also ==
- Government of Tamil Nadu
- Tamil Nadu Government's Departments
