= Department of Social Welfare and Women Empowerment (Tamil Nadu) =

Government department of Tamil Nadu state, India

Agency overview
- Jurisdiction: Tamil Nadu
- Headquarters: Chennai
- Minister responsible: C. Joseph Vijay, Minister of Social Welfare, Women and Children Welfare, Youth Welfare, Aged and Differently Abled Persons Welfare
- Agency executive: Shunchonngam Jatak Chiru, IAS, Principal Secretary, Social Welfare and Women Empowerment
- Parent agency: Government of Tamil Nadu
- Website: Social Welfare and Women Empowerment Department

The Department of Social Welfare and Women Empowerment is one of the departments of Government of Tamil Nadu.

== Overview ==
The department is responsible for the implementation of the welfare schemes for children, women, senior citizens and transgender. It monitors the implementation of various enacted social legislation to protect children, women and senior citizens and to prevent child trafficking, dowry, domestic violence against women, child marriage and sexual offences. The department has three wings: social welfare, social defence and integrated child welfare services.

== Social welfare ==
The directorate of social welfare is responsible for welfare schemes such as marriage assistance to poor, protection of girl children, nutritious meal for children and supply of uniforms to school children. The department runs service homes for the destitute and young girls and working women hostels in district headquarters and industrial areas. Various co-operative societies for women and transgender self-employment are facilitated by the department. The department is also responsible for the monitoring and enrollment of girl students in public schools.

The state was the first to introduce the Midday Meal Scheme to school children which was started in 1926 and expanded to cover all public schools by K. Kamaraj. The state government also introduced a breakfast meal programme for school children in 2022. The department is responsible for the implementation of the schemes. The state introduced free school uniforms to weed out caste, creed and class distinctions among school children in the 1960s and the department is responsible for the distribution of the same.

== Social defence ==
The directorate of social defence is responsible for government pension schemes implemented by revenue department.

== Integrated child development services ==
The department of integrated child development services is responsible for the health and nutrition of pregnant and lactating mothers and children of age 0 to 6 years. The department oversees distribution of nutritional supplements for the responsible categories, ensure healthy child birth, inoculation and healthcare services.

== See also ==
- Government of Tamil Nadu
- Tamil Nadu Government's Departments
