= K. Jegadeshwari =

Indian politician

Member of the Tamil Nadu Legislative Assembly
- Incumbent
- Assumed office 11 May 2026
- Preceded by: S. Thanga Pandian
- Constituency: Rajapalayam

Personal details
- Party: Tamilaga Vettri Kazhagam

Jegadeshwari. K. (born 1986) is an Indian politician from Tamil Nadu. She is a Member of the Legislative Assembly from Rajapalayam in Virudhunagar district representing Tamilaga Vettri Kazhagam.

Jegadeshwari first became an MLA winning on debut in the 2026 Tamil Nadu Legislative Assembly election from Rajapalayam Assembly constituency representing the TVK Party.
