= Department of Social Justice (Tamil Nadu) =

Government department for scheduled castes in India

Agency overview
- Jurisdiction: Tamil Nadu
- Headquarters: Chennai
- Minister responsible: Vanni Arasu, Minister of Social Justice Department
- Agency executive: Dr N. Subbaiyan, IAS, Secretary to Government of Tamil Nadu
- Parent agency: Government of Tamil Nadu
- Website: Department of Social Justice (Tamil Nadu)

The Department of Social Justice is one of the departments of Government of Tamil Nadu. The department is responsible for enacting and implementing various policies for the welfare of scheduled castes and scheduled tribes in the state.

== See also ==
- Government of Tamil Nadu
- Tamil Nadu Government's Departments
