= S. Kamali =

Indian politician (born 1998)

Minister for Animal Husbandry
- Incumbent
- Assumed office 21 May 2026
- Chief Minister: C. Joseph Vijay

Member of the Tamil Nadu Legislative Assembly
- Incumbent
- Assumed office 11 May 2026
- Preceded by: P. Dhanapal
- Constituency: Avanashi

Personal details
- Party: Tamilaga Vettri Kazhagam
- Education: Vidhya Mandir College, Guruswamypalayam (B. Ed.)

Senthilnadhan Kamali (born 1998) is an Indian politician from Tamil Nadu. She is a Member of the Legislative Assembly from Avanashi which is reserved for Scheduled Caste community in Tiruppur district representing the Tamilaga Vettri Kazhagam.

== Early life and education ==
Kamali is from Rasipuram, Tiruppur, Tamil Nadu. Her father Senthilnadhan, is a member of Vijay Rasigar Mandram. She married Pachamuthu, a self employed person, who runs an e-service center in Rasipuram. She completed her Master of Arts in English Literature in 2018 at Pavai Girls Arts and Science College, Rasipuram and did B. Ed. at Vidhya Mandir College, Guruswamypalayam in 2023.

== Career ==
Kamali began her political life with TVK and became an MLA for the first time winning the 2026 Tamil Nadu Legislative Assembly election from Avanashi Assembly constituency representing the Tamilaga Vettri Kazhagam. She polled 84,209 votes and defeated her nearest rival and union minister of state, L. Murugan of the Bharatiya Janata Party, by a margin of 15,373 votes. She also defeated another greenhorn and a 28 year old doctor, Gokilamani. V. of DMK, who finished third behind Murugan.

== Electoral performance ==
Election	Constituency	Political party	Result	Vote %	Opposition			Ref
Election	Constituency	Political party	Result	Vote %	Candidate	Political party	Vote %	Ref
2026	Avinashi	TVK	Won	36.36%	Kamali	Tamilaga Vetri Kalagam	29.72%	-
