= R. V. Ranjithkumar =

Indian politician (born 1976)

Ragavan Veerasamy Ranjith Kumar (born 1976) is an Indian politician from Tamil Nadu. He is a member of the Tamil Nadu Legislative Assembly from Kancheepuram Assembly constituency in Kanchipuram district representing Tamilaga Vettri Kazhagam.

== Early life and education ==
Kumar is from Kanchipuram, Tamil Nadu. He is the son of Ragavan Veerasamy. He runs his own business. He completed his graduation from Tamil Nadu Open University in 2015. He declared assets worth Rs.17 crore in his affidavit to the Election Commission of India.

== Career ==
Kumar became an MLA for the first time winning the 2026 Tamil Nadu Legislative Assembly election from Kancheepuram Assembly constituency representing Tamilaga Vettri Kazhagam. He polled 91,350 votes and defeated his nearest rival, V. Somasundaram of the All India Anna Dravida Munnetra Kazhagam, by a margin of 15,488 votes. He contested the 2021 Tamil Nadu Legislative Assembly election on Amma Makkal Munnetra Kazhagam ticket and finished only fourth in his electoral debut.
