= P. Mathan Raja =

Indian politician

Member of the Tamil Nadu Legislative Assembly
- Incumbent
- Assumed office 2026
- Preceded by: C. Shanmugaiah
- Constituency: Ottapidaram (SC)

Personal details
- Party: Tamilaga Vettri Kazhagam
- Profession: Politician

P. Mathan Raja is an Indian politician from Tamil Nadu. He is a member of the Tamil Nadu Legislative Assembly from Ottapidaram (SC) representing Tamilaga Vettri Kazhagam.

== Political career ==
Mathan Raja won the Ottapidaram (SC) seat in the 2026 Tamil Nadu Legislative Assembly election as a candidate of Tamilaga Vettri Kazhagam. He received 81,625 votes and defeated P. M. Ramajeyam of the Dravida Munnetra Kazhagam by a margin of 29,083 votes. Currently serving as MSME minister.
