= Department of Planning, Development and Special Initiatives (Tamil Nadu) =

Government department of Tamil Nadu state, India

Agency overview
- Jurisdiction: Tamil Nadu
- Headquarters: Chennai
- Ministers responsible: C. Joseph Vijay, Minister of Special Initiatives Department; N. Marie Wilson, Minister of Planning and Development Department
- Agency executive: Sandhya Venugopal Sharma, IAS, Additional Chief Secretary, Planning, Development and Special Initiatives Management
- Parent agency: Government of Tamil Nadu
- Website: Planning, Development and Special Initiatives Department

The Department of Planning, Development and Special Initiatives is one of the departments of Government of Tamil Nadu.

== Objective ==
The department is responsible for coordinating with all the departments to achieve the sustainable development goals for 2030, strategic planning in co-ordination with NITI Aayog, implementation and evaluation of major schemes, programmes and special initiatives of the government, collection, compilation and dissemination of statistical data and providing administrative support for government planning.

== Sub-divisions ==
The following bodies function under the purview of the department:

- Tamil Nadu State Planning Commission (TNSPC): Established in 1976 and responsible for monitoring macroeconomic parameters, reporting and assisting the government in formulating policies for overall development and achievement of goals.
- Department of Economics and Statistics (DES): Formed in 1902 with the objective of collection, compilation, analysis and dissemination of data to enable policy decisions.
- Department of Evaluation and Applied Research (DEAR): Established in 1964 and responsible for conducting survey and research.
- Special Area Development Programme (SADP): Implemented in 1975-76, the programme focuses on development of specially identified areas in the state.
- Chennai Metro Rail Limited (CMRL): A SPV created on 7 November 2007 by a joint venture between Government of India and Government of Tamil Nadu to execute the Chennai Metro project.

== See also ==
- Government of Tamil Nadu
- Tamil Nadu Government's Departments
