= Department of Social Reforms (Tamil Nadu) =

Government department of Tamil Nadu state, India

Agency overview
- Formed: 1999
- Jurisdiction: Tamil Nadu
- Headquarters: Chennai
- Minister responsible: Geetha Jeevan, Minister of Social Reforms Department
- Agency executive: T. Abraham, IAS, Secretary, Social Reforms
- Parent agency: Government of Tamil Nadu
- Website: Social Reforms Department

The Department of Social Reforms is one of the departments of Government of Tamil Nadu.

== Objective ==
The department was established in 1999 and is responsible for social reforms including management of orphanages and correctional facilities.

== Ministers ==
- Geetha Jeevan (2021-)
- V. Saroja (2016-21)
- B. Valarmathi (2011-16)

== See also ==
- Government of Tamil Nadu
- Tamil Nadu Government's Departments
