= V. Gandhiraj =

Indian politician (born 1974)

Vadivel Gandhiraj (born 1974) is an Indian politician from Tamil Nadu. He is a member of the Tamil Nadu Legislative Assembly from Arakkonam Assembly constituency which is reserved for Scheduled Caste community in Ranipet district representing Tamilaga Vettri Kazhagam.

== Early life ==
Gandhiraj is from Arakkonam, Ranipet district, Tamil Nadu. He is the son of Vadivel. He did his schooling at Adi Dravidar Government Boy`s Higher Secondary School in Arakkonam and passed Class 12 in 1992. Later, he joined B.A. degree course but discontinued in second year, and completed ITI at John Bosco ITI in Tiruvallur from 1994 to 1996. He is a civil contractor and declared assets worth Rs.3 crore in his affidavit to the Election Commission of India.

== Career ==
Gandhiraj became an MLA for the first time winning the 2026 Tamil Nadu Legislative Assembly election from Arakkonam Assembly constituency representing Tamilaga Vettri Kazhagam. He polled 73,776 and defeated his nearest rival, Ezhil Caroline of the Viduthalai Chiruthaigal Katchi, by a margin of 23,121 votes.

== Electoral performance ==
Election	Constituency	Political party	Result	Vote %	Opposition			Ref
Election	Constituency	Political party	Result	Vote %	Candidate	Political party	Vote %	Ref
2026	Arakkonam	TVK	Won	40.46%	Ezhil Caroline	VCK	27.78%	-
