= Department of Housing and Urban Development (Tamil Nadu) =

Government department in Tamil Nadu state, India

Agency overview
- Jurisdiction: Tamil Nadu
- Headquarters: Chennai
- Parent agency: Government of Tamil Nadu
- Website: Housing and Urban Development Department

The Department of Housing and Urban Development is one of the departments of Government of Tamil Nadu.

== Objective ==
The objective of the department is to formulate and implement a housing policy, to provision quality housing at affordable cost for the poor, encouraging urban development and town planning through inclusion and balanced growth and development of Chennai metropolitan area.

== Sub-departments ==
Directorate of Town and Country Planning (DTCP) operates under the department and consists of the following undertakings and bodies:

- Chennai Metropolitan Development Authority (CMDA)
- Tamil Nadu Housing Board (TNHB)
- Tamil Nadu Slum Clearance Board (TNSCB)
- Tamil Nadu Cooperative Housing Federation (TNCHF)

== See also ==
- Government of Tamil Nadu
- Tamil Nadu Government's Departments
- Ministry of Urban Development (India)
- Ministry of Housing and Urban Poverty Alleviation (India)
