= Department of Commercial Taxes and Registration (Tamil Nadu) =

Government department of Tamil Nadu state, India

Minister for Commercial Taxes, Registration and Stamp Duty (Tamil Nadu)

Agency overview
- Formed: 1885
- Jurisdiction: Tamil Nadu
- Headquarters: Chennai
- Minister responsible: Logesh Tamilselvan, Minister of Commercial Taxes and Registration Department
- Agency executive: B. Jothi Nirmalasamy, IAS, Secretary, Commercial Taxes and Registration
- Parent agency: Government of Tamil Nadu
- Website: Commercial Taxes and Registration Department

The Department of Commercial Taxes and Registration is one of the departments of Government of Tamil Nadu.It is headed by Minister of Commercial Taxes, Registration and stamp duty The department generates the highest tax revenue for the state government.

== Objective ==
The commercial taxes department is responsible for implementing the commercial taxation policy of the government and ensure collection of taxes. The registration department is responsible for the management and administration of property and related registration services.

== Commercial taxes ==
The department generates the highest tax revenue for the state government. The core function of the department is two pronged: implementation of taxes on various commodities and services as laid out by various tax laws enacted by Government of India and the state government and to maximize the collection of taxes.

== Registration ==
The registration department is responsible for all registration related activities including properties and marriages. The department administers and ensures levying of stamp duties as per the enacted laws and guidelines values of properties. The department is also responsible for the maintenance of registration offices across the state.

== See also ==
- Government of Tamil Nadu
- Tamil Nadu Government's Departments
