= R. Vinoth =

Indian politician (born 1994)

Ravi Vinoth (born 1994) is an Indian politician from Tamil Nadu. He is a member of the Tamil Nadu Legislative Assembly from the Kumbakonam Assembly constituency in Thanjavur district representing the Tamilaga Vettri Kazhagam.

Vinoth is from Kumbakonam, Thanjavur district, Tamil Nadu. He is the son of Ravi. He studied at Sri Kumara Guruparar Swamigal Higher Secondary School, Aduthurai and passed his Class 12. Later, he joined BE at Arasu Engineering College, Kumbakonam but dropped out in 2016. He runs his own business. He declared assets worth Rs.18 lakhs in his affidavit to the Election Commission of India.

== Career ==
Vinoth won the Kumbakonam Assembly constituency representing the Tamilaga Vettri Kazhagam in the 2026 Tamil Nadu Legislative Assembly election. He polled 78,650 votes and defeated G. Anbalagan of the Dravida Munnetra Kazhagam (DMK), by a margin of 679 votes.

.He serves as the Minister for Agriculture and Farmers Welfare in Tamilnadu.
