= Department of Handlooms, Handicrafts, Textiles and Khadi =

Government department of Tamil Nadu state, India

Department of Handlooms, Handicrafts, Textiles and Khadi (Tamil Nadu)

Agency overview
- Formed: 1956
- Jurisdiction: Tamil Nadu
- Headquarters: Chennai
- Minister responsible: Minister of Handlooms, Handicrafts, Textiles and Khadi Department
- Agency executive: Dharmendra Pratap Yadav, IAS, Principal Secretary, Handlooms, Handicrafts, Textiles and Khadi
- Parent agency: Government of Tamil Nadu
- Website: Handlooms, Handicrafts, Textiles and Khadi Department

The Department of Handlooms, Handicrafts, Textiles and Khadi is one of the departments of Government of Tamil Nadu.

== Objective ==
The objective of the department is to promote the growth of various components of the textile industry such as handloom, powerloom, spinning and finished garments.

== Textile industry ==
The state is home to more than half of the operating fiber textile mills in India. Coimbatore is often referred to as the Manchester of South India due to its cotton production and textile industries. As of 2022, Tiruppur exported garments worth $480 billion, contributing to nearly 54% of the all the textile exports from India and the city is known as the knitwear capital due to its cotton knitwear export. As of 2015, the textile industry in the state accounted for 17% of the total invested capital in all the industries. As of 2021, 40% of leather goods exported from India worth ₹9,252 crore (US$960 million) are being manufactured in the state.

Kanchipuram silk sari is a type of silk sari made in the Kanchipuram region the state which has been recognized as a Geographical indication by the Government of India in 2005–2006. Kovai Cora Cotton and Bhavani Jamakkalam are other noted Geographical indications.

== Departments and functions ==
=== Handlooms and textiles ===
Textiles

The state is one of the largest producer of textile yarns and finished garments, accounting for more than 70% of the national output. The department is responsible for the management of entire textile supply chain including facilitating resources including materials, land and labour, textile machinery, education and research and promotion. The department also provides for various savings and pension schemes to support the industries. The government also procures free school uniforms and textiles for distribution to the poor from the textile co-operative industries.

Handloom

The handloom industry employs more than 2.4 lakh workers with more than 52% women in 1.55 lakh units. The state has the third highest number of handlooms and the highest number of handloom weavers in co-operative units. The department of handlooms is responsible for ensuring the sustainability of the weavers by facilitating raw materials for production, infrastructure support, marketing and sales of finished goods through Co-optex.

Powerloom

The powerloom sector in the state accounts for one fifth share of the country with 5.63 lakh units and employing more than ten lakh people. The department is responsible for modernization of the powerloom sector, up-skilling of workers and facilitating marketing and exports.

Sericulture

The state is the third largest producer of silk and the sericulture department is responsible for increasing the silk output, modernization of the industry, education of farmers, research and marketing.

=== Handicrafts and Khadi ===
Handicraft

The handicraft board is responsible for training of artisans, facilitate employment and benefits, improve productivity and quality and sales and marketing of products through "Poompuhar".

Khadi

The Khadi board was created in 1960 and is responsible for improving the production of khadi products, facilitation of financing and social benefits to khadi producers in rural areas and marketing of the products.

Palm products

The Palm products development board functions under the department and was established in 1994. It is responsible for safeguarding the interests of palm farmers, improve production, facilitation of sales and marketing of products.

== See also ==
- Government of Tamil Nadu
- Tamil Nadu Government's Departments
