= Department of Micro, Small and Medium Enterprises (Tamil Nadu) =

Government department of Tamil Nadu state, India

Agency overview
- Jurisdiction: Tamil Nadu
- Headquarters: Chennai
- Minister responsible: P.Mathanraja, Minister of Micro, Small and Medium Enterprises Department
- Agency executive: Archana Patnaik, IAS, Secretary, Legislative Assembly
- Parent agency: Government of Tamil Nadu
- Website: Micro, Small and Medium Enterprises Department

The Department of Micro, Small and Medium Enterprises is one of the departments of Government of Tamil Nadu.

== Objective ==
The objective of the department is to enable and develop the micro, small and medium enterprises.

== Industry ==
The state has the third highest number of MSMEs in India. As of 2016, there are 49.48 lakh MSMEs in the state, 7.8% of the country's total. More than 51% of these industries are located in rural areas. Major industrial sectors include electrical and electronics, leather, auto parts, pharmaceuticals, energy equipment, jewellery, pollution control, sport goods, building material, garments, food processing, plastic and rubber.

== Sub-divisions ==
The following sub-divisions operate under the department:

- Commissionerate of Industries and Commerce: Facilitate policy making and implementation for the growth of the industries
- Tamil Nadu Small Industries Development Corporation (TANSIDCO): Establish and maintain industrial clusters, estates, industrial plots and facilities for workers
- Tamil Nadu Small Industries Corporation (TANSI): Manufacture of steel and wooden furniture for the government
- Entrepreneurship Development and Innovation Institute (edII): Promote entrepreneurship
- Bureau for Facilitating MSMEs of Tamil Nadu (FaMeTN): Facilitate financing and credit for MSMEs
- Tamil Nadu Startup and Innovation Mission (TANSIM): Enable establishments of startups

== See also ==
- Government of Tamil Nadu
- Tamil Nadu Government's Departments
