= B. Rajkumar =

Indian politician (born 1980)

Member of the Tamil Nadu Legislative Assembly
- Incumbent
- Assumed office 11 May 2026
- Preceded by: G. Iyappan
- Constituency: Cuddalore

Personal details
- Party: Tamilaga Vettri Kazhagam

Bhagavantaswamy Rajkumar (born 1980) is an Indian politician from Tamil Nadu. He is a member of the Tamil Nadu Legislative Assembly from the Cuddalore Assembly constituency in Cuddalore district, representing the Tamilaga Vettri Kazhagam.

== Early life ==
Rajkumar is from Cuddalore, Cuddalore district, Tamil Nadu. He is the son of R. Bhagavantaswamy. He completed his Diploma in Mechanical Engineering at Muthiah Polytechnic, Chidambaram, in October 2002. He declared assets worth Rs.45 lakhs in his affidavit to the Election Commission of India. He has a few criminal cases registered against him.

== Career ==
Rajkumar became an MLA for the first time winning the Cuddalore Assembly constituency representing the Tamilaga Vettri Kazhagam in the 2026 Tamil Nadu Legislative Assembly election. He polled 70,856 votes and defeated his nearest rival, A. S. Chandrasekaran of the Indian National Congress, by a margin of 15,519 votes.
