= Department of Youth Welfare and Sports Development (Tamil Nadu) =

Government department of Tamil Nadu state, India

Agency overview
- Jurisdiction: Tamil Nadu
- Headquarters: Chennai
- Ministers responsible: C. Joseph Vijay, Minister of Youth Welfare; Aadhav Arjuna, Minister of Sports Development Department
- Agency executive: Sandeep Nanduri, IAS, Secretary, Youth Welfare and Sports Development
- Parent agency: Government of Tamil Nadu
- Website: Youth Welfare and Sports Development Department

The Department of Youth Welfare and Sports Development is one of the departments of Government of Tamil Nadu. The department is responsible for development and administration of sports infrastructure and development of sportspersons.

Sports Development Authority of Tamil Nadu (SDAT) is the body working under the ministry responsible for implementing the same. Tamil Nadu Physical Education and Sports University (TNPESU), established in 2005, was the first sports university by any state government in India and works on development of physical education and sports. It is first public sports university established in India. The department is also responsible for the management of National Cadet Corps (NCC) and National Service Scheme (NSS).

== See also ==
- Government of Tamil Nadu
- Tamil Nadu Government's Departments
