= Department of Special Programme Implementation (Tamil Nadu) =

Government department of Tamil Nadu state, India

Agency overview
- Jurisdiction: Tamil Nadu
- Headquarters: Chennai
- Minister responsible: C. Joseph Vijay, Minister of Special Programme Implementation Department
- Agency executive: Darez Ahamed, IAS, Secretary, Special Programme Implementation
- Parent agency: Government of Tamil Nadu
- Website: Special Programme Implementation Department

The Department of Special Programme Implementation is one of the departments of Government of Tamil Nadu. The department is responsible for monitoring and implementation of government programmes and skill development.

== Objective and functions ==
The department is responsible for working with other departments to ensure the implementation of various programmes and schemes of the state government. The department serves as the monitoring body of the state government and monitors the progress of various schemes and programmes announced by the government. It is responsible for coordination with various departments and agencies to ensure timelines are met and intended beneficiaries are benefited. The department also co-ordinates the e-governance initiatives and leads the skill development initiatives of the state government.

== Sub-divisions ==
The following sub-departments, bodies and undertakings function under the purview of the department:

- Tamil Nadu Skill Development Corporation (TNSDC)
- Skill Acquisition and Knowledge Awareness for Livelihood Promotion (SANKALP)
- Tamil Nadu Apex Skill Development Centre (TNASDC)
- Tamil Nadu Chief Ministers Fellowship Programme (TNCMFP)

== See also ==
- Government of Tamil Nadu
- Tamil Nadu Government's Departments
