= Department of Legislative Assembly (Tamil Nadu) =

Government department of Tamil Nadu state, India

Agency overview
- Formed: 1956
- Jurisdiction: Tamil Nadu
- Headquarters: Chennai
- Minister responsible: K. A. Sengottaiyan, Minister of Legislative Assembly Department
- Agency executive: R Shanthi, Principal Secretary, Legislative Assembly
- Parent agency: Government of Tamil Nadu
- Website: Legislative Assembly Department

The Department of Legislative Assembly is one of the departments of Government of Tamil Nadu. Established in 1956, it is responsible for enabling the functioning of the Tamil Nadu Legislative Assembly.

== History ==
The legislature department was established in August 1956 and was later bifurcated as legislative assembly and legislative council departments in May 1960 to represent the two houses in existence. On 16 February 1984, the legislative assembly department was renamed as the legislative assembly secretariat with independent status and powers of a department of the state government.

== Objective ==
The objectives of the department based out of the secretariat is to enable the functioning of the Tamil Nadu Legislative Assembly at Fort St. George, Chennai. It is responsible for determining dates of session and prorogation of the assembly, Governor's address to the assembly, planning and co-ordination of legislative and other official business, allocation of government time for discussion of motions given notice of by the members, liaison with leaders of various parties and committees and appointment of members on select committees and other bodies set up by the government.

== See also ==
- Government of Tamil Nadu
- Tamil Nadu Government's Departments
- Ministry of Parliamentary Affairs (India)
