= Department of Finance (Tamil Nadu) =

Government department of Tamil Nadu state, India

Agency overview
- Jurisdiction: Tamil Nadu
- Headquarters: Chennai
- Minister responsible: N. Marie Wilson, Minister of Finance Department
- Agency executive: M.A. Siddique, IAS, Principal Secretary, Finance
- Parent agency: Government of Tamil Nadu
- Website: Finance Department

The Department of Finance is one of the departments of Government of Tamil Nadu. It is responsible for managing the public finances and presenting the budget of the state government.

== Objective ==
The department is responsible for managing the public finances of the state government. It is responsible for the preparation of the state budget and presenting it to the Tamil Nadu Legislative Assembly every year.

== Sub-divisions ==
The following sub-departments are under the administrative control of the finance department.

- Treasuries and accounts
- Local fund audit
- Small savings
- Government data center
- Co-operative audit
- Internal and statutory boards audit
- Pension

== Finances ==
As of 2022, Tamil Nadu's GSDP was ₹23.65 lakh crore (US$250 billion), second highest amongst Indian states. For the financial year 2023–24, the projected expenditure is ₹3.65 lakh crore (US$38 billion) against a projected revenue of ₹2.73 lakh crore (US$28 billion) with the fiscal deficit at ₹0.92 lakh crore (US$9.6 billion).

== List of Finance Secretaries of Tamil Nadu (1947-2026) ==
1. T.N.S. Raghavan, ICS
2. T. A. Varghese, ICS
3. G. Ramachandran, IAS
4. S. Venkitaramanan, IAS
5. S. Guhan, IAS
6. K. Venkatesan, IAS
7. K. J. M. Shetty, IAS
8. C. Ramachandran, IAS

== See also ==
- Government of Tamil Nadu
- Tamil Nadu Government's Departments
