= Department of Welfare of Differently Abled Persons (Tamil Nadu) =

Indian state government agency

Agency overview
- Formed: 1994
- Jurisdiction: Tamil Nadu, India
- Headquarters: Chennai
- Minister responsible: C. Joseph Vijay, Minister for Welfare of Differently Abled Persons Department
- Agency executive: Jayashree Muralidharan IAS, Secretary to Government
- Parent agency: Government of Tamil Nadu
- Website: Welfare of Differently Abled Persons Department

The Department of Welfare of Differently Abled Persons departments of Government of Tamil Nadu. The department is responsible for implementation of welfare schemes and rehabilitation of differently abled. In 1993, the Government of Tamil Nadu established a separate directorate for the rehabilitation of the differently abled persons from the social department and enacted a policy in 1994. In 1995, it was upgraded as the office of the state commissioner for the differently abled with a state commissioner appointed since 1999.

== See also ==
- Government of Tamil Nadu
- Tamil Nadu Government's Departments
