= Tamil Nadu Public Works Department =

Agency overview
- Formed: 1858
- Jurisdiction: Tamil Nadu
- Headquarters: Chennai
- Minister responsible: Aadhav Arjuna, Minister for Public Works Department
- Agency executive: Mangat Ram Sharma, IAS, Additional Chief Secretary to Government
- Parent agency: Government of Tamil Nadu
- Child agency: Public Works Department (Buildings), Chepauk, Chennai, Ph No. 044 2841 0402
- Website: Public Works Department

The Public Works Department (PWD) is one of the departments of Government of Tamil Nadu. The department is one of the oldest departments and became a government body in 1858.

== Objective ==
The department is responsible for planning, designing, construction and maintenance of Government buildings across the state. It is also responsible for the execution of local area development works sanctioned under MLAs and MP funds, reconstruction works during calamities and issuance of rent certificate for private buildings used by Government departments.

== Ministers ==
- Aadhav Arjuna (2026-Present)
- E. V. Velu (2021–2026)
- Edappadi K. Palaniswami (2016–21)
- O. Panneerselvam (2013–16)
- K. V. Ramalingam (2011–13)
- Duraimurugan (1989–91, 96–2001, 2006–09)
- S. R. Eradha (1980)
- M. G. Ramachandran (1977–89)
- P. U. Shanmugam (1969, 71, 77)
- M. Karunanidhi (1967–71, 2009–11)
- V. Ramaiah (1962–67)
- P. Kakkan (1957–62)
- Shanmugha Rajeswara Sethupathi (1953–57)
- M. Bhaktavatsalam (1946–52)
- P. Kalifulla Sahib Bahadur (1939–46)
- Maulana Yakub Hasan Sait (1937–39)

== See also ==
- Government of Tamil Nadu
- Tamil Nadu Government's Departments
- Ministry of Social Justice and Empowerment (India)
- Central Public Works Department, India
