= Palaniswami ministry =

Government of Tamil Nadu, India (2017–2021)

K. Palaniswami Ministry
- 20th Ministry of Tamil Nadu
- Head of the government
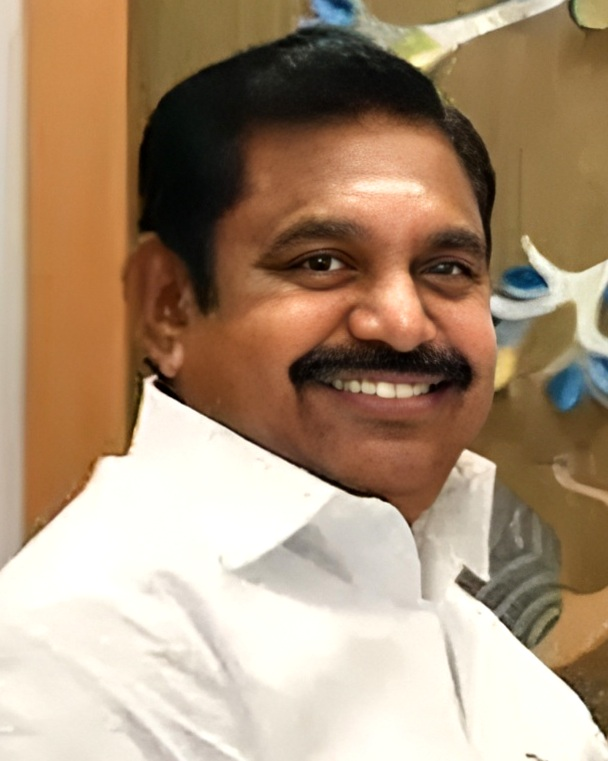
- Dr. Edappadi K. Palaniswami
- Date formed: 16 February 2017
- Date dissolved: 7 May 2021

People and organisations
- Head of state: C. Vidyasagar Rao (Till 6 October 2017); Banwarilal Purohit (From 6 October 2017 till 7 May 2021)
- Head of government: Edappadi K. Palaniswami
- Status in legislature: Majority government

History
- Election: 2016
- Predecessor: Third Panneerselvam ministry
- Successor: M. K. Stalin ministry

The Ministry of Palaniswami was the Council of Ministers, headed by Edappadi K. Palaniswami, that was formed after the fifteenth legislative assembly election, which was held on 16th of May 2016. The results of the election were announced on 19 May 2016, and this led to the formation of the 15th Assembly. On 16 February 2017, the Council took office. He was selected as CM by VK Sasikala

== Constitutional requirement ==
=== For the Council of Ministers to aid and advise Governor ===
According to Article 163 of the Indian Constitution,

# There shall be a Council of Ministers with the Chief Minister at the head to aid and advise the Governor in the exercise of his function, except in so far as he is by or under this Constitution required to exercise his functions or any of them in his discretion.

1. If any question arises whether any matter is or is not a matter as respects which the Governor is by or under this Constitution required to act in his discretion, the decision of the Governor in his discretion shall be final, and the validity of anything done by the Governor shall not be called in question on the ground that he ought or ought not to have acted in his discretion.
2. The question whether any, and if so what, advice was tendered by Ministers to the Governor shall not be inquired into in any court.

This means that the Ministers serve under the pleasure of the Governor and he/she may remove them, on the advice of the Chief Minister, whenever they want.

The Chief Minister shall be appointed by the Governor and the other Ministers shall be appointed by the Governor on the advice of the Chief Minister, and the Minister shall hold office during the pleasure of the Governor:
Provided that in the States of Bihar, Madhya Pradesh and Odisha, there shall be a Minister in charge of tribal welfare who may in addition be in charge of the welfare of the Scheduled Castes and backward classes or any other work.

# The Council of Minister shall be collectively responsible to the Legislative Assembly of the State.

1. Before a Minister enters upon his office, the Governor shall administer to him the oaths of office and of secrecy according to the forms set out for the purpose in the Third Schedule.
2. A Minister who for any period of six consecutive months is not a member of the Legislature of the State shall at the expiration of that period cease to be a Minister.
3. The salaries and allowances of Ministers shall be such as the Legislature of the State may from time to time by law determine and, until the Legislature of the State so determines, shall be a specified in the Second Schedule.

== Council of Ministers ==
S.No	Name	Constituency	Designation	Departments	Party
1.	K. Palaniswami	Edappadi	Chief Minister of Tamil Nadu	Public; Home.; Police; Indian Administrative Service; Indian Police Service; Indian Forest Service; General Administration.; District Revenue Officers.; Irrigation (including Minor Irrigation).; Programme Works.; Public Works.; Highways and Minor Ports.; Departments not allocated to any other Minister	All India Anna Dravida Munnetra Kazhagam
2.	O. Panneerselvam	Bodinayakkanur	Deputy Chief Minister of Tamil Nadu	Finance.; Planning.; Legislative Assembly; Elections.; Passports.; Housing; Rural Housing and Housing Development.; Slum Clearance Board and Accommodation Control.; Town Planning.; Urban Development.; Chennai Metropolitan Development Authority.	All India Anna Dravida Munnetra Kazhagam
3.	C. Sreenivaasan	Dindigul	Minister for Forests	Forests.	All India Anna Dravida Munnetra Kazhagam
4.	K. A. Sengottaiyan	Gobichettipalayam	Minister for School Education and Youth Welfare & Sports	School Education.; Youth Welfare and Sports.	All India Anna Dravida Munnetra Kazhagam
5.	K. Raju	Madurai West	Minister for Co-operation	Co-operation.; Statistics.; Ex-Servicemen Welfare.	All India Anna Dravida Munnetra Kazhagam
6.	P. Thangamani	Kumarapalayam	Minister for Electricity and Prohibition & Excise	Electricity.; Prohibition and Excise.; Non-Conventional Energy.; Molasses	All India Anna Dravida Munnetra Kazhagam
7.	S. P. Velumani	Thondamuthur	Minister for Local Administration and Rural Development	Municipal Administration.; Rural Development.; Panchayats and Panchayat Unions.; Poverty Alleviation Programmes.; Rural Indebtedness.; Urban and Rural Water Supply.; Implementation of Special Programme.	All India Anna Dravida Munnetra Kazhagam
8.	D. Jayakumar	Royapuram	Minister for Fisheries	Fisheries.; Personnel.; Administrative Reforms.	All India Anna Dravida Munnetra Kazhagam
9.	C. Ve. Shanmugam	Villupuram	Minister for Law	Law.; Courts and Prisons.; Mines and Minerals.	All India Anna Dravida Munnetra Kazhagam
10.	K. P. Anbalagan	Palacode	Minister for Higher Education and Agriculture	Higher Education.; Technical Education.; Electronics.; Science and Technology.; Agriculture.; Agricultural Engineering.; Agro Service Co-operatives.; Horticulture.; Sugarcane Cess.; Sugarcane Development and Waste Land Development.	All India Anna Dravida Munnetra Kazhagam
11.	V. Saroja	Rasipuram	Minister for Social Welfare	Social Welfare.; Women's and Children's Welfare.; Orphanages and Correctional Administration.; Integrated Child Development.	All India Anna Dravida Munnetra Kazhagam
12.	M. C. Sampath	Cuddalore	Minister for Industries	Industries.; Steel Control.	All India Anna Dravida Munnetra Kazhagam
13.	K. C. Karuppannan	Bhavani	Minister for Environment	Environment and Pollution Control.	All India Anna Dravida Munnetra Kazhagam
14.	R. Kamaraj	Nannilam	Minister for Food & Civil Supplies	Food.; Civil Supplies.; Consumer Protection.; Price Control.	All India Anna Dravida Munnetra Kazhagam
15.	O. S. Manian	Vedaranyam	Minister for Handlooms & Textiles	Handlooms and Textiles.	All India Anna Dravida Munnetra Kazhagam
16.	K. Radhakrishnan	Udumalaipettai	Minister for Animal Husbandry	Animal Husbandry.	All India Anna Dravida Munnetra Kazhagam
17.	C. Vijayabaskar	Viralimalai	Minister for Health & Family Welfare	Health.; Medical Education.; Family Welfare.	All India Anna Dravida Munnetra Kazhagam
18.	C. Raju	Kovilpatti	Minister for Information & Publicity	Information and Publicity.; Film Technology and Cinematograph Act.; Stationery and Printing; Government Press.	All India Anna Dravida Munnetra Kazhagam
19.	R. B. Udhaya Kumar	Tirumangalam	Minister for Revenue and Information Technology	Revenue.; District Revenue Establishment.; Deputy Collectors.; Weights and Measures.; Debt Relief including Legislation on Money lending.; Chits.; Registration of Companies and Disaster Management.; Information Technology.	All India Anna Dravida Munnetra Kazhagam
20.	N. Natarajan	Tiruchirappalli East	Minister for Tourism	Tourism.; Tourism Development Corporation.	All India Anna Dravida Munnetra Kazhagam
21.	K.C. Veeramani	Jolarpet	Minister for Commercial Taxes & Registration	Commercial Taxes.; Registration and Stamp Act.	All India Anna Dravida Munnetra Kazhagam
22.	K. T. Rajenthra Bhalaji	Sivakasi	Minister for Milk & Dairy Development	Milk and Dairy Development.	All India Anna Dravida Munnetra Kazhagam
23.	P. Benjamin	Maduravoyal	Minister for Micro, Small and Medium Enterprises	Rural Industries.; Small Industries.	All India Anna Dravida Munnetra Kazhagam
24.	M. R. Vijayabhaskar	Karur	Minister for Transport	Transport.; Nationalised Transport and Motor Vehicles Act.	All India Anna Dravida Munnetra Kazhagam
25.	Nilofer Kafeel	Vaniyambadi	Minister for Labour & Employment	Labour.; Population.; Employment and Training.; Newsprint Control.; Census.; Urban and Rural Employment; Wakf Board.	All India Anna Dravida Munnetra Kazhagam
26.	V. M. Rajalakshmi	Sankarankoil	Minister for Adi Dravidar Welfare	Adi Dravidar Welfare.; Hill Tribes and Bonded Labour.	All India Anna Dravida Munnetra Kazhagam
27.	K. Pandiarajan	Avadi	Minister for Tamil Development and Archaeology	Tamil Official Language and Tamil Culture.; Archaeology.	All India Anna Dravida Munnetra Kazhagam
28.	G. Baskaran	Sivaganga	Minister for Village Industries	Khadi and Village Industries Board.; Bhoodan and Gramadhan.	All India Anna Dravida Munnetra Kazhagam
29.	S. Ramachandran	Arani	Minister for Hindu Religious & Charitable Endowments	Hindu Religious.; Charitable Endowments.	All India Anna Dravida Munnetra Kazhagam
30.	S. Valarmathi	Srirangam	Minister for Backward Classes and Minorities Welfare	Backward Classes.; Most Backward Classes and Denotified Communities.; Overseas Indians.; Refugees and Evacuees and Minorities Welfare.	All India Anna Dravida Munnetra Kazhagam

== Cabinet Reshuffles ==
21 August 2017

S.No	Name of the Minister	Existing Designation	Proposed Designation	Proposed allocation of portfolios
1.	O. Panneerselvam		Deputy Chief Minister of Tamil Nadu	Finance.; Planning.; Legislative Assembly; Elections.; Passports.; Housing; Rural Housing and Housing Development.; Slum Clearance Board and Accommodation Control.; Town Planning.; Urban Development.; Chennai Metropolitan Development Authority.
2.	K. Pandiarajan		Minister for Tamil Development and Archaeology	Tamil Official Language and Tamil Culture.; Archaeology.
3.	K. A. Sengottaiyan	Minister for School Education and Youth Welfare & Sports	Minister for School Education	School Education.
4.	D. Jayakumar	Minister for Finance and Fisheries	Minister for Fisheries	Fisheries.; Personnel.; Administrative Reforms.
5.	C. Ve. Shanmugam	Minister for Law	Minister for Law	Law.; Courts and Prisons.; Mines and Minerals.
6.	M. C. Sampath	Minister for Industries	Minister for Industries	Industries; Steel Control
7.	K. Radhakrishnan	Minister for Housing and Urban Development	Minister for Animal Husbandry	Animal Husbandry
8.	S. Ramachandran	Minister for Hindu Religious & Charitable Endowments and Tamil Development	Minister for Hindu Religious & Charitable Endowments	Hindu Religious; Charitable Endowments
9.	P. Balakrishna Reddy	Minister for Animal Husbandry	Minister for Youth Welfare & Sports	Youth Welfare and Sports.

26 March 2019

S.No	Name of the Minister	Existing Designation	Proposed Designation	Proposed allocation of portfolios
1.	P. Balakrishna Reddy	Minister for Youth Welfare & Sports		
2.	K. A. Sengottaiyan	Minister for School Education	Minister for School Education and Youth Welfare & Sports	School Education.; Youth Welfare and Sports.

7 August 2019

S.No	Name of the Minister	Existing Designation	Proposed Designation	Proposed allocation of portfolios
1.	M. Manikandan	Minister for Information Technology		
2.	R. B. Udhaya Kumar	Minister for Revenue	Minister for Revenue and Information Technology	Revenue.; District Revenue Establishment.; Deputy Collectors.; Weights and Measures.; Debt Relief including Legislation on Money lending.; Chits.; Registration of Companies and Disaster Management.; Information Technology.

31 October 2020

S.No	Name of the Minister.	Existing Designation	Proposed Designation	Proposed allocation of portfolios
1.	R. Doraikannu	Minister for Agriculture		
2.	K. P. Anbalagan	Minister for Higher Education	Minister for Higher Education and Agriculture	Higher Education.; Technical Education.; Electronics.; Science and Technology.; Agriculture.; Agricultural Engineering.; Agro Service Co-operatives.; Horticulture.; Sugarcane Cess.; Sugarcane Development and Waste Land Development.

== Demographics of the Council of Ministers ==
Cabinet by District

S.No	District	Ministers	Name of Ministers
1.	Ariyalur	-	-
2.	Chengalpattu	-	-
3.	Chennai	2	P. Benjamin; D. Jayakumar
4.	Coimbatore	1	S. P. Velumani
5.	Cuddalore	1	M. C. Sampath
6.	Dharmapuri	1	K. P. Anbalagan
7.	Dindigul	1	C. Sreenivaasan
8.	Erode	2	K. A. Sengottaiyan; K. C. Karuppannan
9.	Kallakurichi	-	-
10.	Kanchipuram	-	-
11.	Kanniyakumari	-	-
12.	Karur	1	M. R. Vijayabhaskar
13.	Krishnagiri	-	-
14.	Madurai	2	K. Raju; R. B. Udhayakumar
15.	Mayiladuthurai	-	-
16.	Nagapattinam	1	O. S. Manian
17.	Namakkal	2	P. Thangamani; V. Saroja
18.	Nilgiris	-	-
19.	Perambalur	-	-
20.	Pudukkottai	1	C. Vijayabaskar
21.	Ramanathapuram	-	-
22.	Ranipet	-	-
23.	Salem	1	K. Palaniswami
24.	Sivagangai	1	G. Baskaran
25.	Tenkasi	1	V. M. Rajalakshmi
26.	Thanjavur	-	-
27.	Theni	1	O. Panneerselvam
28.	Thoothukudi	1	C. Raju
29.	Tiruchirappalli	2	N. Natarajan; S. Valarmathi
30.	Tirunelveli	-	-
31.	Tirupathur	2	K. C. Veeramani; Nilofer Kafeel
32.	Tiruppur	1	K. Radhakrishnan
33.	Tiruvallur	1	K. Pandiarajan
34.	Tiruvannamalai	1	S. Ramachandran
35.	Tiruvarur	1	R. Kamaraj
36.	Vellore	-	-
37.	Viluppuram	1	C. Ve. Shanmugam
38.	Virudhunagar	1	K. T. Rajenthra Bhalaji

== Achievements ==
The Government introduced various schemes like Kudimaramaththu Work similar to Telangana's Mission Kakatiya, FAME India scheme and Amma Patrol in Tamil Nadu to ascertain the security of women and children in public places. In response to the introduction of mandatory NEET exams starting in 2017, Palaniswami government formed a high-level committee led by M. Anandakrishnan in May that year to reform the Tamil Nadu school education system. The school textbook syllabus and exam pattern for classes 1 to 12 were revised on par with CBSE standards in phases, starting from the 2018–19 academic year, to better prepare students for competitive exams.

On 15 August 2018, Palaniswami Government announced a 2% sub-quota in select government jobs and State Public Sector Undertakings for national, state, and international-level medal-winning sportspersons in games organized by recognized federations, later increasing it to 3% on 16 October 2018.

In 2019, The Chief Minister went on a 13-day tour in the United States, United Kingdom and United Arab Emirates to promote foreign investment in Tamil Nadu. While there he launched the Yaadhum Oore programme (lit. all countries, based on Purananuru 192) to encourage the Tamil diaspora to re-invest in Tamil Nadu. During trip he secured 3 lakh crores worth of foreign investment, a greater amount than even his predecessor Jayalalithaa did. His administration created new districts such as Tenkasi, Kallakurichi, Tirupattur, Ranipet and Chengalpattu in 2019, and Mayiladuthurai in 2020, by carving them out from existing districts. After six decades of waiting by the people, Palaniswami laid the foundation stone for the ₹1,652-crore Athikadavu–Avinashi Groundwater Recharge and Drinking Water Supply Scheme on 28 February 2019, and the project work commenced on 25 December that year.

In February 2020, Palaniswami led Tamil Nadu government declared the Cauvery delta region as a Protected Special Agriculture Zone. The announcement was widely hailed by political parties and farmers organisations.

In 2020, Palaniswami led AIADMK government passed order for 7.5% Quota in Medical Admissions for Govt. School Students. He took action to set up government medical colleges in newly formed 11 districts which offered 1,650 more seats to then existing 3,400 seats. After the first three phases of excavation by the Archaeological Survey of India (ASI) at Keezhadi between 2014 and 2017, the Palaniswami Government, whose State Department of Archaeology took over further excavations in consultation with the ASI, initiated the fourth phase of excavations in 2017–18 with an allocation of Rs.55 lakh, during which as many as 5,820 rare artifacts and brick constructions dating back to the Sangam era were excavated. On 20 July 2020, Palaniswami laid the foundation for the Keezhadi museum to showcase the artefacts unearthed from Keezhadi excavation site in Sivagangai district.

Under this governance, Tamil Nadu was rated as the best governed state based on a composite index in the context of sustainable development according to the Public Affairs Index-2020 released by the Public Affairs Centre in Oct. 2020. Palaniswami is also praised for his administration during the coronavirus pandemic. Tamil Nadu was one of the few states that did not register negative growth in the period of pandemic.

During this regime, Tamil Nadu was the best performing big state overall from the year 2018 to 2021. With a gross state domestic product of $290 billion or Rs 21.6 lakh crore, Tamil Nadu became India's second-largest economy.

In 2020, the study “States of the State” of India Today, said that Palaniswami led Tamil Nadu has topped in 11 categories from a total of 12, including economy, tourism, infrastructure, inclusive development, law and order, along with entrepreneurship, cleanliness, environment, health, education and agriculture. Tamil Nadu had been chosen for this recognition for the third consecutive year.
