= Third Panneerselvam ministry =

Government of Tamil Nadu, India (2016–2017)

- 19th Ministry of Tamil Nadu
- Date formed: 5 December 2016
- Date dissolved: 15 February 2017

People and organisations
- Head of state: Governor C. Vidyasagar Rao
- Head of government: O. Panneerselvam
- No. of ministers: 32
- Member parties: AIADMK
- Status in legislature: Majority
- Opposition party: DMK
- Opposition leader: M. K. Stalin

History
- Election: 2016
- Legislature term: 5 Years
- Predecessor: Sixth Jayalalithaa ministry
- Successor: Palaniswami ministry

O. Panneerselvam was sworn in as Chief Minister of Tamil Nadu on 6 December 2016. O. Panneerselvam was elected as the Chief Minister of Tamil Nadu following the death of incumbent Chief Minister Jayalalithaa.

== Cabinet ministers ==
Ministers sworn on 6 December 2016:

S.no	Name	Constituency	Designation	Portfolios	Party
Chief Minister
1.	O. Panneerselvam	Bodinayakkanur	Chief Minister	Public; Police; Home; Indian Administrative Service; Indian Police Service; Indian Forest Service; District Revenue Officers; General Administration; Legislative Assembly; Elections and Passports; Finance; Planning; Personnel and Administrative Reforms, Training	AIADMK
Cabinet Ministers
2.	Dindigul C. Sreenivasan	Dindigul	Minister for Forests	Forests	AIADMK
3.	Edappadi Palaniswami	Edappadi	Minister for Public Works, Highways and Minor Ports	Public Works; Irrigation including Minor Irrigation *Programme Works; Highways; Minor Ports	AIADMK
4.	Sellur K. Raju	Madurai West	Minister for Co-operation	Co-operation; Statistics; Ex-Servicemen Welfare	AIADMK
5.	P. Thangamani	Kumarapalayam	Minister for Electricity, Prohibition and Excise	Electricity; Non-Conventional Energy Development; Prohibition and Excise; Molasses and Prevention of Corruption Act	AIADMK
6.	S. P. Velumani	Thondamuthur	Minister for Municipal Administration, Rural Development and Implementation of Special Programme	Municipal Administration; Rural Development; Panchayats and Panchayat Unions; Poverty Alleviation Programmes; Rural Indebtedness; Urban and Rural Water Supply; Implementation of Special Programme	AIADMK
7.	D. Jayakumar	Royapuram	Minister for Fisheries	Fisheries and Fisheries Development Corporation	AIADMK
8.	C. Shanmugam	Villupuram	Minister for Law, Courts and Prisons	Law; Courts; Prisons	AIADMK
9.	K. P. Anbalagan	Palacode	Minister for Higher Education	Higher Education including Technical *Education; Electronics; Science and Technology	AIADMK
10.	Dr. V. Saroja	Rasipuram	Minister for Social Welfare and Nutritious Noon Meal Programme	Social Welfare including Women's and Children's Welfare; Orphanages and Correctional Administration; Integrated Child Development and Beggar Homes; Welfare of the Differently Abled and Social Reforms; Nutritious Noon Meal Programme	AIADMK
11.	M. C. Sampath	Cuddalore	Minister for Industries	Industries; Steel Control; Mines and Minerals; Special Initiatives	AIADMK
12.	K. C. Karuppannan	Bhavani	Minister for Environment	Environment; Pollution Control	AIADMK
13.	R. Kamaraj	Nannilam	Minister for Food and Civil Supplies	Food; Civil Supplies; Consumer Protection and Price Control	AIADMK
14.	O. S. Manian	Vedaranyam	Minister for Handlooms and Textiles	Handlooms and Textiles	AIADMK
15.	Udumalai K. Radhakrishnan	Udumalaipettai	Minister for Housing and Urban Development	Housing; Rural Housing and Housing Development; Slum Clearance Board and Accommodation Control; Town Planning; Urban Development; Chennai Metropolitan Development Authority	AIADMK
16.	C. Vijayabaskar	Karur	Minister for Health and Family Welfare	Health; Medical Education; Family Welfare	AIADMK
17.	R. Doraikkannu	Papanasam	Minister for Agriculture	Agriculture; Agricultural Engineering; Agro Service Cooperatives, *Horticulture; Sugarcane Cess; Sugarcane Development; Waste Land Development	AIADMK
18.	Kadambur Raju	Kovilpatti	Minister for Information and Publicity	Information and Publicity; Film Technology and Cinematograph Act; Stationery; Printing and Government Press	AIADMK
19.	R. B. Udhayakumar	Tirumangalam	Minister for Revenue	Revenue; District Revenue Establishment; Deputy Collectors; Weights and Measures; Debt Relief including Legislation on *Money lending; Chits; Registration of Companies	AIADMK
20.	Vellamandi N. Natarajan	Tiruchirappalli (East)	Minister for Tourism	Tourism; Tourism Development Corporation	AIADMK
21.	K. C. Veeramani	Jolarpet	Minister for Commercial Taxes	Commercial Taxes; Registration and Stamp Act	AIADMK
22.	K. Pandiarajan	Avadi	Minister for School Education and Sports and Youth Welfare	School Education; Archaeology; Youth Welfare; Sports Development Department	AIADMK
23.	K. T. Rajenthra Bhalaji	Sivakasi	Minister for Milk and Dairy Development	Milk and Dairy Development	AIADMK
24.	P. Benjamin	Maduravoyal	Minister for Rural Industries	Rural Industries including Cottage Industries; Small Industries	AIADMK
25.	Dr. Nilofer Kafeel	Vaniyambadi	Minister for Labour	Labour; Population; Employment and Training; Newsprint Control; Census; Urban and Rural Employment; Wakf Board	AIADMK
26.	M.R.Vijayabhaskar	Karur	Minister for Transport	Transport; Nationalised Transport and Motor Vehicles Act	AIADMK
27.	Dr. M. Manikandan	Ramanathapuram	Minister for Information Technology	Information Technology	AIADMK
28.	V. M. Rajalakshmi	Sankarankoil	Minister for Adi Dravidar and Tribal Welfare	Adi Dravidar Welfare; Hill Tribes; Bonded Labour	AIADMK
29.	G. Baskaran	Sivaganga	Minister for Khadi and Village Industries Board	Khadi and Village Industries Board, *Bhoodhan and Gramadhan	AIADMK
30.	Sevvoor S. Ramachandran	Arani	Minister for Hindu Religious and Charitable Endowments	Hindu Religious and Charitable Endowments; Tamil Official Language and Tamil Culture	AIADMK
31.	S. Valarmathi	Srirangam	Minister for Backward Classes and Minorities Welfare	Backward Classes and Most Backward Classes and Denotified Communities; Overseas Indians; Refugees and Evacuees; Minorities Welfare	AIADMK
32.	P. Balakrishna Reddy	Hosur	Minister for Animal Husbandry	Animal Husbandry	AIADMK
