= Sixth Jayalalithaa ministry =

Government of Tamil Nadu, India in 2016

- 18th Ministry of Tamil Nadu

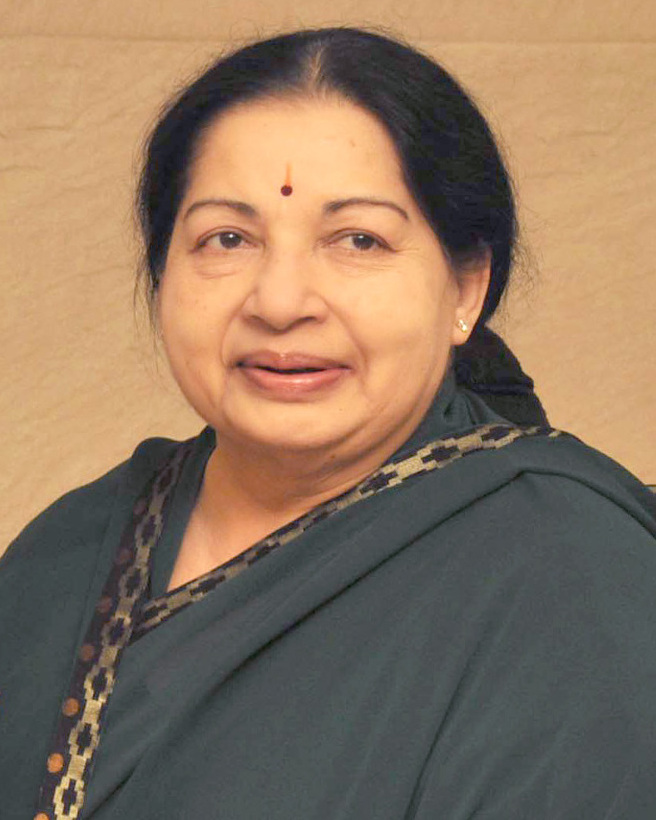
- J. Jayalalithaa
- Date formed: 23 May 2016
- Date dissolved: 5 December 2016

People and organisations
- Head of state: Governor: Konijeti Rosaiah; C. Vidyasagar Rao (Additional Charge)
- Head of government: J. Jayalalithaa
- No. of ministers: 28
- Member parties: AIADMK
- Status in legislature: Majority
- Opposition party: DMK
- Opposition leader: M. K. Stalin

History
- Incoming formation: 15th Tamil Nadu Assembly
- Outgoing formation: 14th Tamil Nadu Assembly
- Election: 2016
- Outgoing election: 2011
- Legislature term: 5 Years
- Predecessor: Fifth Jayalalithaa ministry
- Successor: Third Panneerselvam ministry

J. Jayalalithaa was sworn in as Chief Minister of Tamil Nadu on 23 May 2016. Two major political parties Dravida Munnetra Kazhagam (DMK) and All India Anna Dravida Munnetra Kazhagam (AIADMK) faced the assembly election held on 16 May 2016 for the 232 seats (except Thanjavur and Aravakurichi for which held on 26 October 2016) of the Legislative Assembly in the state of Tamil Nadu in India. AIADMK under J. Jayalalithaa won the elections and became the first ruling party to be re-elected in the state since 1984 with a simple majority. On 22 September 2016, Jayalalithaa was hospitalised as her health condition worsened. Her official duties were handed over to her aide O. Panneerselvam on 12 October 2016, though she continued to remain as the chief minister of the state. On 5 December 2016, the hospital announced her death and O. Panneerselvam sworn in as her successor.

== Cabinet ministers ==
S.no	Name	Constituency	Designation	Portfolios	Party
Chief Minister
1.	J. Jayalalithaa	Radhakrishnan Nagar	Chief Minister	Public; Home; Police; Indian Administrative Service; Indian Police Service; Indian Forest Service; District Revenue Officers; General Administration	AIADMK
Cabinet Ministers
2.	O. Panneerselvam	Bodinayakkanur	Minister for Finance	Finance; Personnel and Administrative Reforms	AIADMK
3.	Dindigul C. Sreenivasan	Dindigul	Minister for Forests	Forests	AIADMK
4.	Edappadi Palaniswami	Edappadi	Minister for Public Works, Highways and Minor Ports	Public Works; Irrigation including Minor Irrigation *Programme Works; Highways; Minor Ports	AIADMK
5.	Sellur K. Raju	Madurai West	Minister for Co-operation and Labour	Labour; Co-operation; Statistics; Ex-Servicemen Welfare	AIADMK
6.	P. Thangamani	Kumarapalayam	Minister for Electricity, Prohibition and Excise	Electricity; Non-Conventional Energy Development; Prohibition and Excise; Molasses and Prevention of Corruption Act	AIADMK
7.	S. P. Velumani	Thondamuthur	Minister for Municipal Administration, Rural Development and Implementation of Special Programme	Municipal Administration; Rural Development; Panchayats and Panchayat Unions; Poverty Alleviation Programmes; Rural Indebtedness; Urban and Rural Water Supply; Implementation of Special Programme	AIADMK
8.	D. Jayakumar	Royapuram	Minister for Fisheries	Fisheries and Fisheries Development Corporation	AIADMK
9.	C. Shanmugam	Villupuram	Minister for Law, Courts and Prisons	Law; Courts; Prisons	AIADMK
10.	K. P. Anbalagan	Palacode	Minister for Higher Education	Higher Education including Technical *Education; Electronics; Science and Technology	AIADMK
11.	Dr. V. Saroja	Rasipuram	Minister for Social Welfare and Nutritious Noon Meal Programme	Social Welfare including Women's and Children's Welfare; Orphanages and Correctional Administration; Integrated Child Development and Beggar Homes; Welfare of the Differently Abled and Social Reforms; Nutritious Noon Meal Programme	AIADMK
12.	M. C. Sampath	Cuddalore	Minister for Industries	Industries; Steel Control; Mines and Minerals; Special Initiatives	AIADMK
13.	K. C. Karuppannan	Bhavani	Minister for Environment	Environment; Pollution Control	AIADMK
14.	R. Kamaraj	Nannilam	Minister for Food and Civil Supplies	Food; Civil Supplies; Consumer Protection and Price Control	AIADMK
15.	O. S. Manian	Vedaranyam	Minister for Handlooms and Textiles	Handlooms and Textiles	AIADMK
16.	Udumalai K. Radhakrishnan	Udumalaipettai	Minister for Housing and Urban Development	Housing; Rural Housing and Housing Development; Slum Clearance Board and Accommodation Control; Town Planning; Urban Development; Chennai Metropolitan Development Authority	AIADMK
17.	Dr. C. Vijayabaskar	Viralimalai	Minister for Health	Health; Medical Education; Family Welfare	AIADMK
18.	R. Doraikkannu	Papanasam	Minister for Agriculture	Agriculture; Agricultural Engineering; Agro Service Cooperatives; Animal Husbandry; Horticulture; Sugarcane Cess; Sugarcane Development; Waste Land Development	AIADMK
19.	Kadambur Raju	Kovilpatti	Minister for Information and Publicity	Information and Publicity; Film Technology and Cinematograph Act; Stationery; Printing and Government Press	AIADMK
20.	R. B. Udhayakumar	Tirumangalam	Minister for Revenue	Revenue; District Revenue Establishment; Deputy Collectors; Weights and Measures; Debt Relief including Legislation on *Money lending; Chits; Registration of Companies	AIADMK
21.	S. P. Shunmuganathan	Srivaikuntam	Minister for Milk and Dairy Development	Milk and Dairy Development	AIADMK
22.	Vellamandi N. Natarajan	Tiruchirappalli (East)	Minister for Tourism	Tourism; Tourism Development Corporation	AIADMK
23.	K. C. Veeramani	Jolarpet	Minister for Commercial Taxes	Commercial Taxes; Registration and Stamp Act	AIADMK
24.	K. T. Rajenthra Bhalaji	Sivakasi	Minister for Rural Industries	Rural Industries	AIADMK
25.	P. Benjamin	Maduravoyal	Minister for School Education, Sports and Youth Welfare	School Education; Sports; Youth Welfare	AIADMK
26.	M.R.Vijayabhaskar	Karur	Minister for Transport	Transport; Nationalised Transport and Motor Vehicles Act	AIADMK
27.	Dr. M. Manikandan	Ramanathapuram	Minister for Information Technology	Information Technology	AIADMK
28.	V. M. Rajalakshmi	Sankarankoil	Minister for Adi Dravidar and Tribal Welfare	Adi Dravidar Welfare; Hill Tribes; Bonded Labour	AIADMK
29.	S. Valarmathi	Srirangam	Minister for Backward Classes and Minorities Welfare	Backward Classes and Most Backward Classes and Denotified Communities; Overseas Indians; Refugees and Evacuees; Minorities Welfare	AIADMK

== Achievements ==
The government within 100 days of resuming power on 23 May 2016, wrote off the outstanding crop loans given by cooperative banks to over 16.94 lakh farmers, gave free power to households to extent of first 100 units and gave free power to handloom weavers to extent of 200 units, gave 750 units of power to power loom weavers, implemented closure of 500 liquor shops and reduction of working hours of liquor outlets emergence of power surplus states. The establishment of first 1,000 MW nuclear power plant at Kudankulam is also regarded as one of the achievements. Jayalalithaa Government increased the freedom fighters monthly pension to Rs 12,000, family pension and increased special pension to Rs 6,000. On 21 September 2016 Jayalalithaa Government inaugurated two Chennai Metro rail lines by way of video conferencing.

== Gallery ==
Jayalalithaa - PM Modi Meet, June 2016

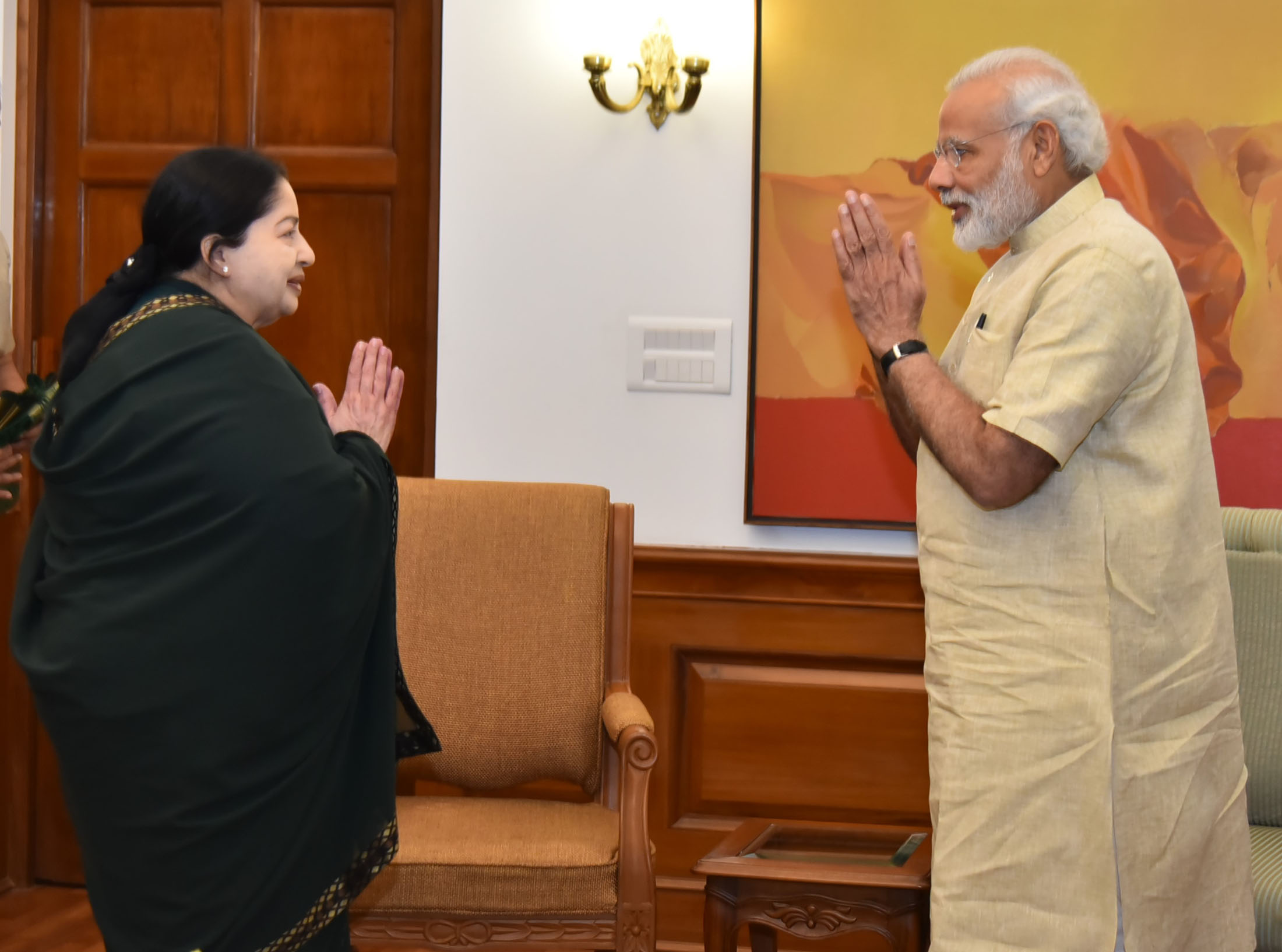

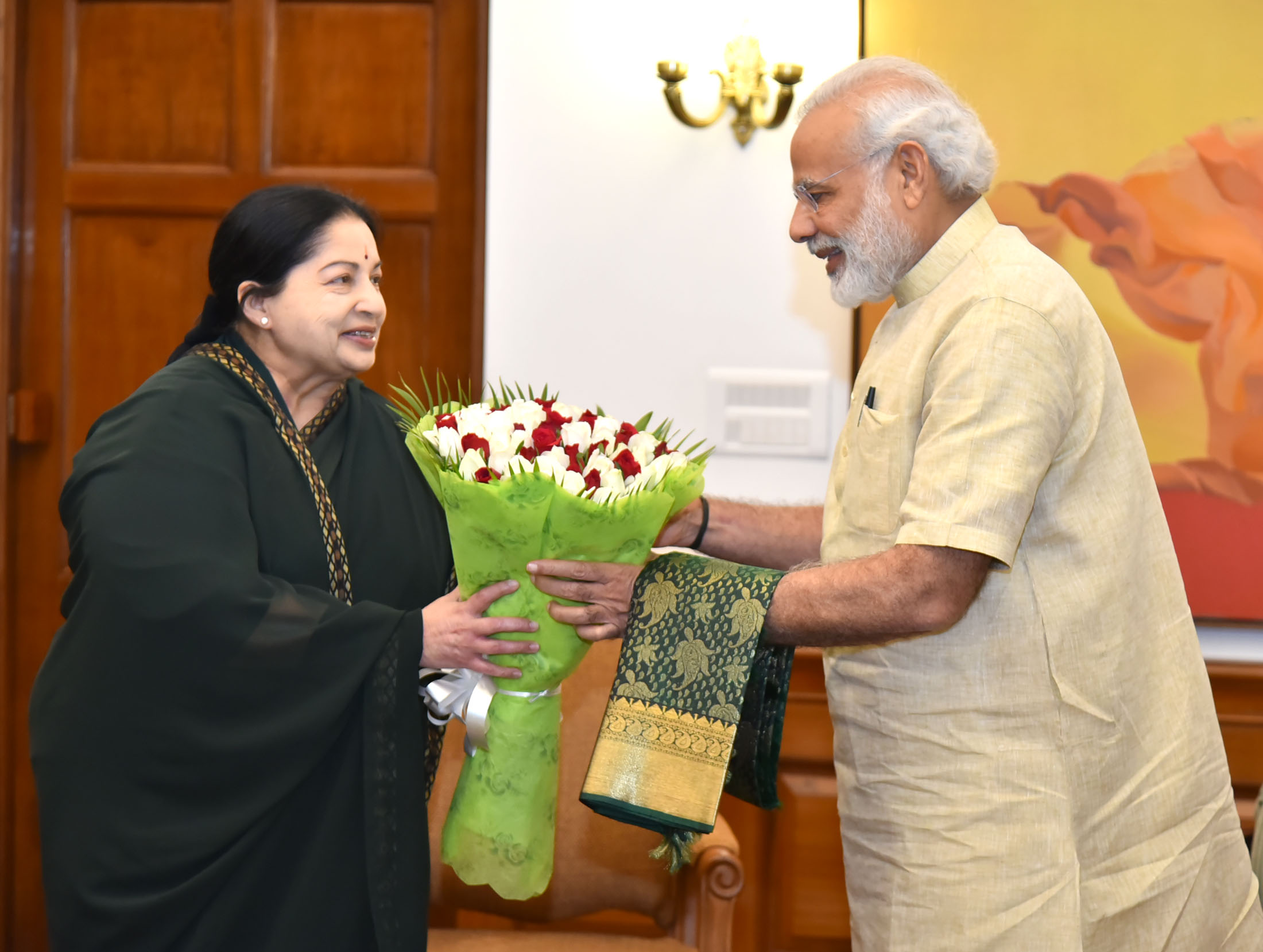

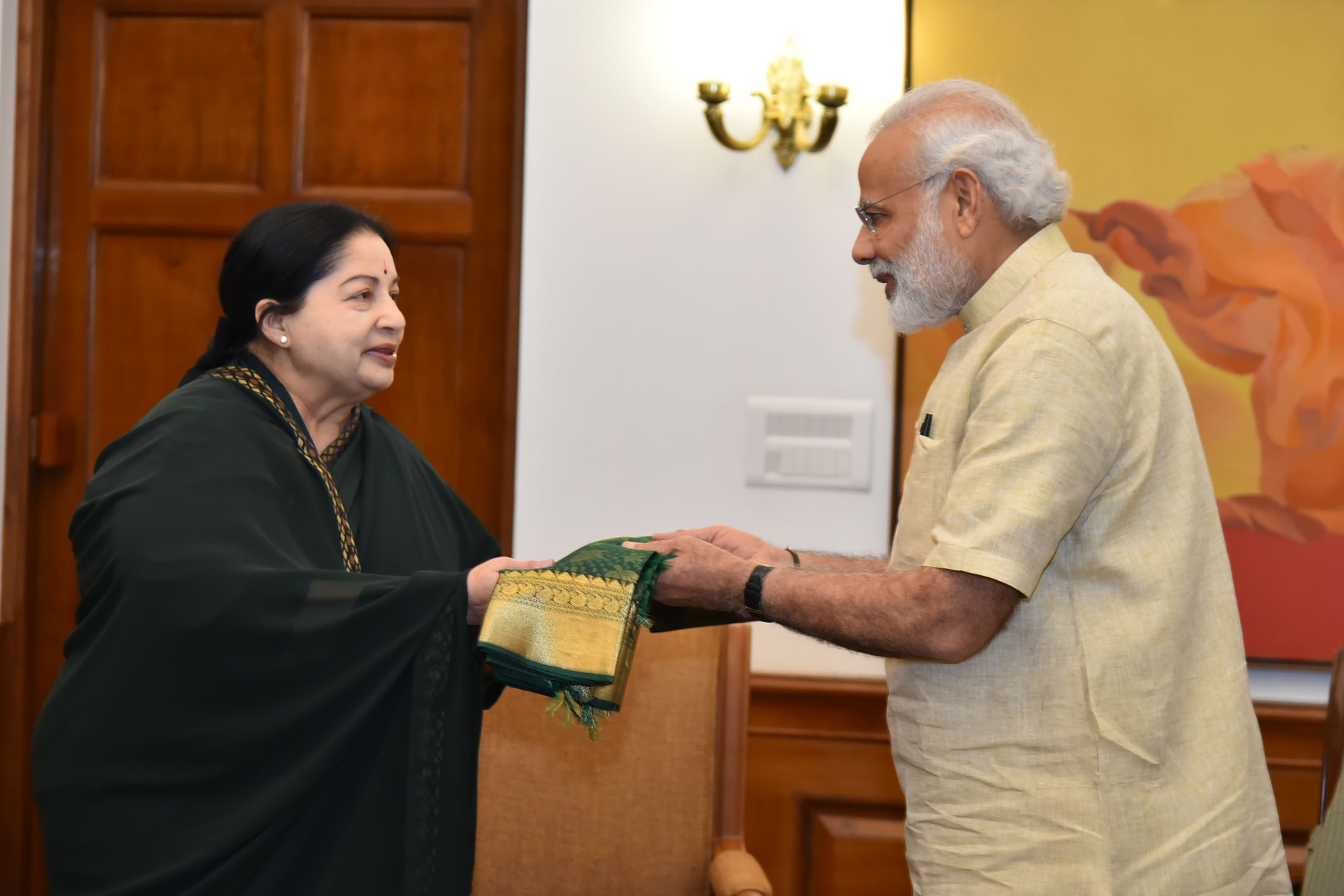

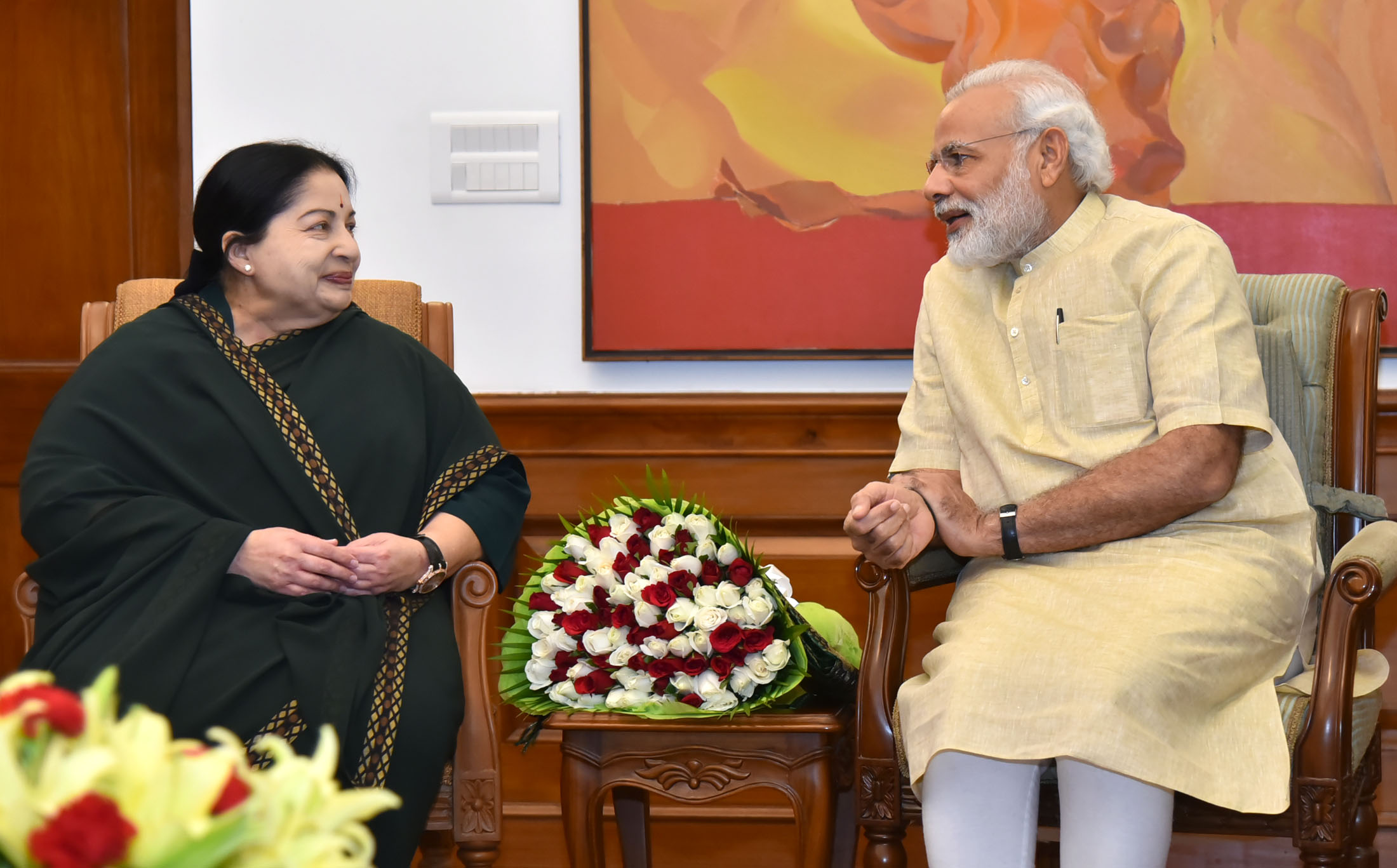

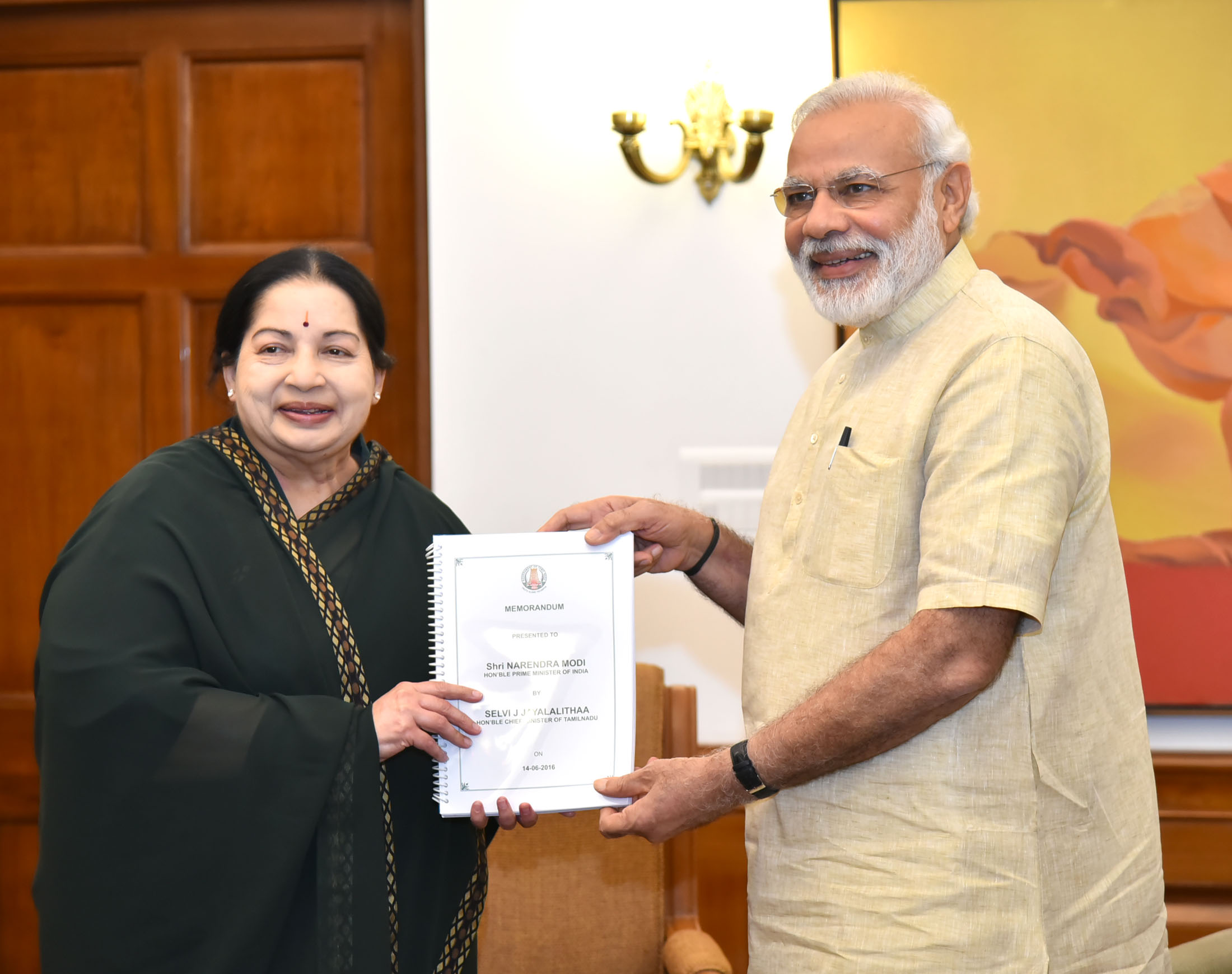
Jayalalithaa meets Prime Minister Narendra Modi in New Delhi, after sworn in as Tamil Nadu Chief Minister post 2016 state election victory
Jayalalithaa - Modi - Putin Meet, August 2016

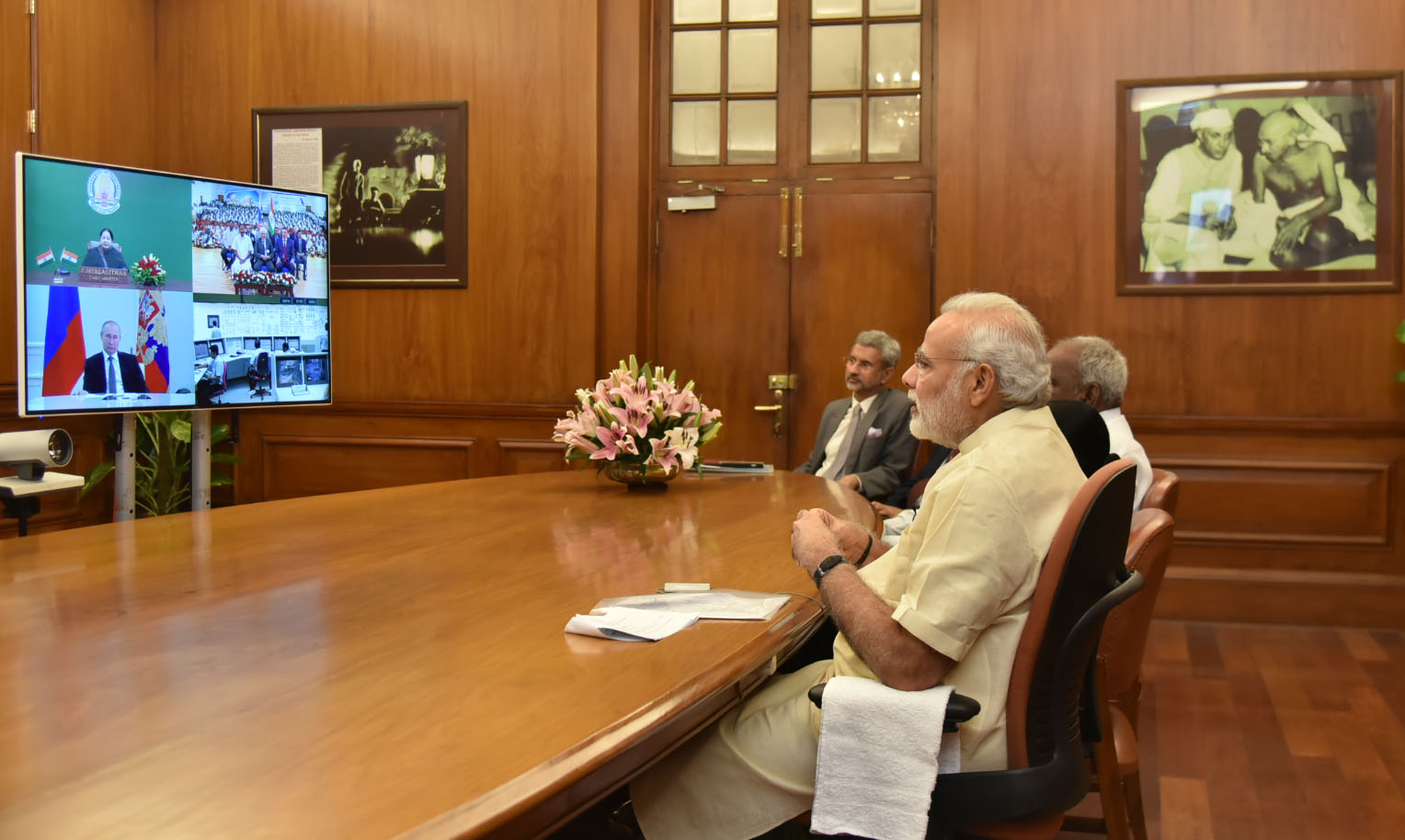

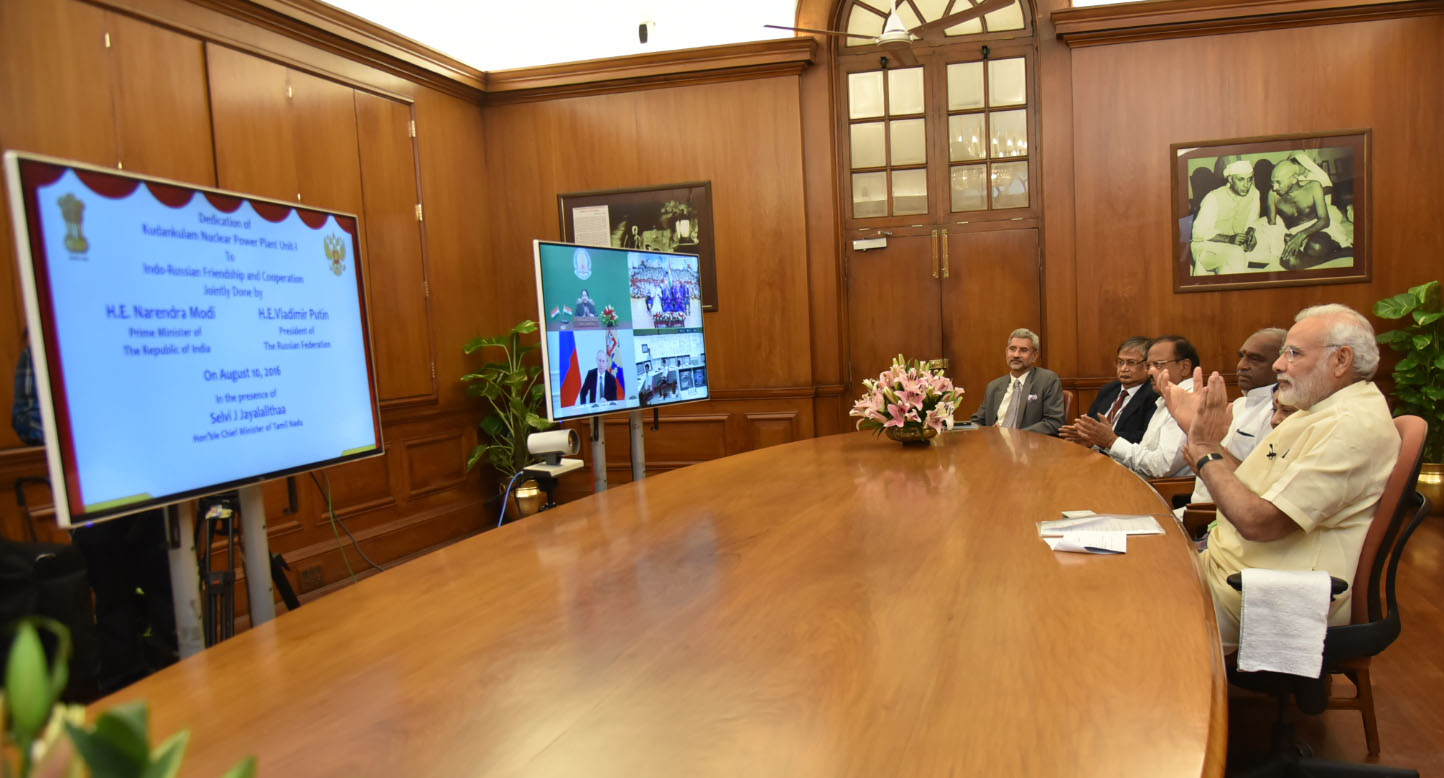
Jayalalithaa along Russian President Vladimir Putin, When PM Modi dedicated Kudankulam nuclear power plant unit-1 to the Nation, through video conferencing on 10 August 2016
