= 15th Tamil Nadu Assembly =

2016–2021 Tamil Nadu Assembly term

←	14th	16th	→

Overview
- Legislative body: Tamil Nadu Legislative Assembly
- Meeting place: Fort St. George, Chennai
- Term: 23 May 2016 – 6 May 2021
- Election: 2016 Tamil Nadu Legislative Assembly election
- Government: Sixth Jayalalithaa ministry (2016); Third Panneerselvam ministry (2016-2017); Palaniswami ministry (2017-2021)
- Opposition: Dravida Munnetra Kazhagam
- Website: Official website
- Members: 235
- Speaker: P. Dhanapal
- Deputy Speaker: V. Jayaraman
- Chief Minister: Edappadi K. Palaniswami
- Deputy Chief Minister: O. Panneerselvam (2017-2021)
- Leader of the Opposition: M. K. Stalin
- Party control: All India Anna Dravida Munnetra Kazhagam

The 15th Assembly of Tamil Nadu succeeded the 14th Tamil Nadu Assembly and was constituted after the victory of All India Anna Dravida Munnetra Kazhagam (AIADMK) and allies in the 2016 state assembly election held on 16 May. J. Jayalalitha assumed office as Chief Minister of Tamil Nadu for the sixth time.

== Overview ==
Source: Tamil Nadu Legislative Assembly website

Office	Office bearer
Speaker	P. Dhanapal
Deputy Speaker	Jayaraman
Leader of the House	O. Panneerselvam (until 17 February 2017) K.A. Sengottaiyan (17 February 2017 to 4 January 2018) O. Panneerselvam (from 4 January 2018)
Leader of Opposition	M. K. Stalin

== Chief ministers ==
Chief Minister	Took office	Left office	Term	Notes
J. Jayalalithaa	23 May 2016	5 December 2016	195 days	Died in office
O. Panneerselvam	5 December 2016	16 February 2017	73 days	O. Panneerselvam gave up his position, allegedly so that V. K. Sasikala could take his place as the head of the government.
Edappadi K. Palaniswami	16 February 2017	6 May 2021	4 years 2 months 21 days	With her chief ministerial hopes ended by a conviction in a disproportionate assets case, V.K. Sasikala named Edappadi K. Palaniswami as her successor.

== Council of Ministers ==
The council of Ministers in the Cabinet of Chief Minister Edappadi K. Palaniswami as follows

Name	Image	Designation	Portfolios
Edappadi K. Palaniswami		Chief Minister	Public, Indian Administrative Service, Indian Police Service, Indian Forest Service, General Administration, District Revenue Officers, Police and Home, Public Works, Irrigation including Minor Irrigation, Programme Works, Highways and Minor Ports
O. Panneerselvam		Deputy Chief Minister	Finance, Planning, Legislative Assembly, Elections and Passports, Housing, Rural Housing and Housing Development, Slum Clearance Board and Accommodation Control, Town Planning, Urban Development and Chennai Metropolitan Development Authority
Dindigul C. Sreenivasan		Minister for Forests	Forests
K. A. Sengottaiyan		Minister for School Education, Minister for Youth Welfare and Sports Development	School Education, Youth Welfare and Sports Development Department
Sellur K. Raju		Minister for Co-operation	Co-operation, Statistics and Ex-Servicemen Welfare
P. Thangamani		Minister for Electricity, Minister for Prohibition and Excise	Electricity, Non-Conventional Energy Development, Prohibition and Excise, Molasses and Prevention of Corruption Act
S. P. Velumani		Minister for Municipal Administration, Minister for Rural Development and Implementation of Special Programme	Municipal Administration, Rural Development, Panchayats and Panchayat Unions, Poverty Alleviation Programmes, Rural Indebtedness, Urban and Rural Water Supply, Implementation of Special Programme
D. Jayakumar		Minister for Fisheries Minister for Personal and Administrative Reforms	Fisheries and Fisheries Development Corporation Personnel and Administrative Reforms, Personnel and Administrative Reforms (Training)
C. Ve. Shanmugam		Minister for Law, Courts and Prisons, Minister for Mines and Minerals	Law, Courts and Prisons, Mines and Minerals
K. P. Anbalagan		Minister for Higher Education	Higher Education including Technical Education, Electronics, Science and Technology
V. Saroja		Minister for Social Welfare and Nutritious Noon Meal Programme	Social Welfare including Women's and Children's Welfare, Orphanages and Correctional Administration, Integrated Child Development and Beggar Homes, Welfare of the Differently Abled and Social Reforms and Nutritious Noon Meal Programme
M. C. Sampath		Minister for Industries, Steel Control and Special Initiatives	Industries, Steel Control and Special Initiatives
K. C. Karuppannan		Minister for Environment	Environment and Pollution Control
R. Kamaraj		Minister for Food and Civil Supplies	Food, Civil Supplies, Consumer Protection and Price Control
O. S. Manian		Minister for Handlooms and Textiles	Handlooms and Textiles
Udumalai K. Radhakrishnan		Minister for Animal Husbandry	Animal Husbandry
C. Vijaya Baskar		Minister for Health and Family Welfare	Health, Medical Education and Family Welfare
R. Doraikkannu		Minister for Agriculture	Agriculture, Agricultural Engineering, Agro Service Cooperatives, Horticulture, Sugarcane Cess, Sugarcane Development and Waste Land Development
Kadambur Raju		Minister for Information and Publicity	Information and Publicity; Film Technology and Cinematograph Act, Stationery and Printing and Government Press
R. B. Udhayakumar		Minister for Revenue Minister for Disaster Management	Revenue, District Revenue Establishment, Deputy Collectors, Weights and Measures, Debt Relief including Legislation on Money lending, Chits, Registration of Companies Disaster Management
Vellamandi N. Natarajan		Minister for Tourism	Tourism, Tourism Development Corporation
K. C. Veeramani		Minister for Commercial Taxes	Commercial Taxes, Registration and Stamp Act
K. T. Rajenthra Bhalaji		Minister for Milk and Dairy Development	Milk and Dairy Development
P. Benjamin		Minister for Rural Industries	Rural Industries including Cottage Industries, Small Industries
M. R. Vijayabhaskar		Minister for Transport	Transport, Nationalised Transport and Motor Vehicles Act
Nilofer Kafeel		Minister for Labour	Labour, Population, Employment and Training, Newsprint Control, Census and Urban and Rural Employment and Wakf Board
M. Manikandan		Minister for Information Technology	Information Technology
V. M. Rajalakshmi		Minister for Adi Dravidar and Tribal Welfare	Adi Dravidar Welfare, Hill Tribes and Bonded Labour
K. Pandiarajan		Minister for Tamil Official Language and Tamil Culture	Tamil Official Language and Tamil Culture and Archaeology
G. Baskaran		Minister for Khadi and Village Industries Board	Khadi and Village Industries Board, Bhoodhan and Gramadhan
Sevvoor S. Ramachandran		Minister for Hindu Religious and Charitable Endowments	Hindu Religious and Charitable Endowments
S. Valarmathi		Minister for Backward Classes and Minorities Welfare	Backward Classes, Most Backward Classes and Denotified Communities, Overseas Indians, Refugees and Evacuees and Minorities Welfare

== Party positions ==
Party	Number of members
All India Anna Dravida Munnetra Kazhagam	123
Dravida Munnetra Kazhagam	100
Indian National Congress	7
Bharatiya Janata Party	0
Indian Union Muslim League	1
Independent	1
Nominated	1
Vacant	1
Total	235

The 123 AIADMK members include three independents who contested and won under the AIADMK symbol.

== Members ==
Information derived from data produced by the Election Commission of India (ECI) except where noted. The results for two constituencies – Aravakurichi and Thanjavur – were undeclared at the time that the ECI published its list. Reserved constituencies for candidates from the Scheduled Castes and Scheduled Tribes (SC / ST) were defined in 2007 by the Delimitation Commission.

Results
#	Name	Winner	Party
Tiruvallur District
1	Gummidipoondi	K. S. Vijayakumar	AIADMK
2	Ponneri (SC)	P. Balaraman	AIADMK
3	Tiruttani	P. M. Narasimhan	AIADMK
4	Thiruvallur	V. G. Raajendran	DMK
5	Poonamallee (SC)	A. Krishnaswamy	DMK
6	Avadi	K. Pandiarajan	AIADMK
Chennai District
7	Maduravoyal	P. Benjamin	AIADMK
8	Ambattur	V. Alexander	AIADMK
9	Madavaram	S. Sudharsanam	DMK
10	Thiruvottiyur	Vacant	
11	Dr. Radhakrishnan Nagar	T. T. V. Dhinakaran	AMMK
12	Perambur	R. D. Sekar	DMK
13	Kolathur	M. K. Stalin	DMK
14	Villivakkam	B. Ranganathan	DMK
15	Thiru. Vi. Ka. Nagar (SC)	P. Sivakumar	DMK
16	Egmore (SC)	K. S. Ravichandran	DMK
17	Royapuram	D. Jayakumar	AIADMK
18	Harbour	P. K. Sekar Babu	DMK
19	Chepauk-Thiruvallikeni	Vacant	
20	Thousand Lights	K. K. Selvam	BJP
21	Anna Nagar	M. K. Mohan	DMK
22	Virugambakkam	V. N. Virugai Ravi	AIADMK
23	Saidapet	M. A. Subramanian	DMK
24	T. Nagar	B. Sathyanarayanan	AIADMK
25	Mylapore	R. Nataraj	AIADMK
26	Velachery	Vagai Chandrasekhar	DMK
27	Sholinganallur	Ramesh S. Aravind	DMK
28	Alandur	T. M. Anbarasan	DMK
Kanchipuram District
29	Sriperumbudur (SC)	K. Palani	AIADMK
Chengalpattu District
30	Pallavaram	I. Karunanithi	DMK
31	Tambaram	S. R. Raja	DMK
32	Chengalpattu	M. Varalakshmi	DMK
33	Thiruporur	L. Idhayavarman	DMK
34	Cheyyur (SC)	R. T. Arasu	DMK
35	Maduranthakam (SC)	S. Pugazhenthi	DMK
Kanchipuram District
36	Uthiramerur	K. Sundar	DMK
37	Kancheepuram	C. V. M. P. Ezhilarasan	DMK
Ranipet District
38	Arakkonam (SC)	S. Ravi	AIADMK
39	Sholingur	G. Sampathu	AIADMK
Vellore District
40	Katpadi	Duraimurugan	DMK
Ranipet District
41	Ranipet	R. Gandhi	DMK
42	Arcot	J. L. Eswarappan	DMK
Vellore District
43	Vellore	P. Karthikeyan	DMK
44	Anaikattu	A. P. Nandakumar	DMK
45	K. V. Kuppam (SC)	G. Loganathan	AIADMK
46	Gudiyattam (SC)	Vacant	
Tirupattur District
47	Vaniyambadi	Kafeel Nilofer	AIADMK
48	Ambur	A. C. Vilwanathan	DMK
49	Jolarpet	K. C. Veeramani	AIADMK
50	Tirupattur, Vellore	A. Nallathambi	DMK
Krishnagiri District
51	Uthangarai (SC)	N. Manoranjitham	AIADMK
52	Bargur	C. V. Rajendiran	AIADMK
53	Krishnagiri	T. Senguttuvan	DMK
54	Veppanahalli	P. Murugan	DMK
55	Hosur	S. A. Sathya	DMK
56	Thalli	Y. Prakaash	DMK
Dharmapuri District
57	Palacode	K. P. Anbalagan	AIADMK
58	Pennagaram	P. N. P. Inbasekaran	DMK
59	Dharmapuri	P. Subramani	DMK
60	Pappireddippatti	A. Govindasamy	AIADMK
61	Harur (SC)	V. Sampathkumar	AIADMK
Tiruvannamalai District
62	Chengam (SC)	M. P. Giri	DMK
63	Tiruvannamalai	E. V. Velu	DMK
64	Kilpennathur	K. Pitchandi	DMK
65	Kalasapakkam	V. Panneerselvam	AIADMK
66	Polur	K. V. Sekaran	DMK
67	Arani	S. Sevoor Ramachandran	AIADMK
68	Cheyyar	K. Mohan	AIADMK
69	Vandavasi (SC)	S. Ambethkumar	DMK
Villupuram District
70	Gingee	K. S. Masthan	DMK
71	Mailam	R. Masilamani	DMK
72	Tindivanam (SC)	P. Seethapathy	DMK
73	Vanur (SC)	M. Chakrapani	AIADMK
74	Villupuram	C. Ve. Shanmugam	AIADMK
75	Vikravandi	R. Muthamilselvan	AIADMK
Kallakurichi District
76	Tirukkoyilur	K. Ponmudy	DMK
77	Ulundurpettai	R. Kumaraguru	AIADMK
78	Rishivandiyam	K. Karthikeyan	DMK
79	Sankarapuram	T. Udhayasuriyan	DMK
80	Kallakurichi (SC)	A. Prabhu	AIADMK
Salem District
81	Gangavalli (SC)	A. Nallathambi	AIADMK
82	Attur (SC)	R. M. Chinnathambi	AIADMK
83	Yercaud (ST)	G. Chitra	AIADMK
84	Omalur	S. Vetrivel	AIADMK
85	Mettur	S. Semmalai	AIADMK
86	Edappadi	Edappadi K. Palaniswami	AIADMK
87	Sankari	S. Raja	AIADMK
88	Salem (West)	G. Venkatachalam	AIADMK
89	Salem (North)	R. Rajendran	DMK
90	Salem (South)	A. B. Sakthivel	AIADMK
91	Veerapandi	P. Manonmani	AIADMK
Namakkal District
92	Rasipuram (SC)	V. Saroja	AIADMK
93	Senthamangalam (ST)	C. Chandrasekaran	AIADMK
94	Namakkal	K. P. P. Baskar	AIADMK
95	Paramathi Velur	K. S. Moorthiy	DMK
96	Tiruchengodu	Pon. Saraswathi	AIADMK
97	Kumarapalayam	P. Thangamani	AIADMK
Erode District
98	Erode (East)	K. S. Thennarasu	AIADMK
99	Erode (West)	K. V. Ramalingam	AIADMK
100	Modakkurichi	V. P. Sivasubramani	AIADMK
Tiruppur District
101	Dharapuram (SC)	V. S. Kalimuthu	INC
106	Kangayam	U. Thaniyarasu	AIADMK
Erode District
103	Perundurai	N. D. Venkatachalam	AIADMK
104	Bhavani	K. C. Karuppannan	AIADMK
105	Anthiyur	K. R. Rajakrishnan	AIADMK
106	Gobichettipalayam	K. A. Sengonttaiyan	AIADMK
107	Bhavanisagar (SC)	S. Eswaran	AIADMK
Nilgiris District
108	Udhagamandalam	R. Ganesh	INC
109	Coonoor	A. Ramu	AIADMK
110	Gudalur (SC)	M. Thiravidamani	DMK
Coimbatore District
111	Mettupalayam	O. K. Chinnaraj	AIADMK
Tiruppur District
112	Avanashi (SC)	P. Dhanapal	AIADMK
113	Tiruppur (North)	K. N. Vijayakumar	AIADMK
114	Tiruppur (South)	S. Gunasekaran	AIADMK
115	Palladam	A. Natarajan	AIADMK
116	Sulur	P. Kandhasamy	AIADMK
Coimbatore District
117	Kavundampalayam	V. C. Arukutty	AIADMK
118	Coimbatore North	P. R. G. Arun Kumar	AIADMK
119	Thondamuthur	S. P. Velumani	AIADMK
120	Coimbatore (South)	Arjunan alias K. Amman Arjunan	AIADMK
121	Singanallur	N. Karthik	DMK
122	Kinathukadavu	A. Shanmugam	AIADMK
123	Pollachi	Pollachi V. Jayaraman	AIADMK
124	Valparai (SC)	V. Kasthuri Vasu	AIADMK
Tiruppur District
125	Udumalaipettai	K. Radhakrishnan	AIADMK
126	Madathukulam	R. Jayaramakrishnan	DMK
Dindigul District
127	Palani	I. P. Senthil Kumar	DMK
128	Oddanchatram	R. Sakkarapani	DMK
129	Athoor	I. Periyasamy	DMK
130	Nilakottai (SC)	S. Thenmozhi	AIADMK
131	Natham	M. A. Andiambalam	DMK
132	Dindigul	C. Sreenivasan	AIADMK
133	Vedasandur	V. P. B. Paramasivam	AIADMK
Karur District
134	Aravakurichi	V. Senthil Balaji	DMK
135	Karur	M. R. Vijayabhaskar	AIADMK
136	Krishnarayapuram (SC)	M. Geetha	AIADMK
137	Kulithalai	E. Ramar	DMK
Tiruchirappalli District
138	Manapaarai	R. Chandrasekar	AIADMK
139	Srirangam	S. Valarmathi	AIADMK
140	Tiruchirappalli (West)	K. N. Nehru	DMK
141	Tiruchirappalli (East)	Vellamandi N. Natarajan	AIADMK
142	Thiruverumbur	Anbil Mahesh Poyyamozhi	DMK
143	Lalgudi	A. Soundarapandian	DMK
144	Manachanallur	M. Parameswari	AIADMK
145	Musiri	M. Selvarasu	AIADMK
146	Thuraiyur (SC)	S. Stalinkumar	DMK
Perambalur District
147	Perambalur (SC)	R. Thamizhselvan	AIADMK
148	Kunnam	R. T. Ramachandran	AIADMK
Ariyalur District
149	Ariyalur	S. Rajendran	AIADMK
150	Jayankondam	J. K. N. Ramajeyalingam	AIADMK
Cuddalore District
151	Tittakudi (SC)	V. Ganesan	DMK
152	Vriddhachalam	V. T. Kalaiselvan	AIADMK
153	Neyveli	Rajendran Saba	DMK
154	Panruti	P. Sathya	AIADMK
155	Cuddalore	M. C. Sampath	AIADMK
156	Kurinjipadi	M. R. K. Panneerselvam	DMK
157	Bhuvanagiri	K. Durai Saravanan	DMK
158	Chidambaram	K. A. Pandian	AIADMK
159	Kattumannarkoil (SC)	N. Murugumaran	AIADMK
Mayiladuthurai District
160	Sirkazhi (SC)	P. V. Bharathi	AIADMK
161	Mayiladuthurai	V. Rathakrishnan	AIADMK
162	Poompuhar	S. Pavunraj	AIADMK
Nagapattinam District
163	Nagapattinam	M. Thamimun Ansari	AIADMK
164	Kilvelur (SC)	U. Mathivanan	DMK
165	Vedaranyam	O. S. Manian	AIADMK
Tiruvarur District
166	Thiruthuraipoondi (SC)	P. Adalarasan	DMK
167	Mannargudi	T. R. B. Rajaa	DMK
168	Thiruvarur	Poondi K. Kalaivanan	DMK
169	Nannilam	R. Kamaraj	AIADMK
Thanjavur District
170	Thiruvidaimarudur (SC)	Govi Chezhiaan	DMK
171	Kumbakonam	G. Anbalagan	DMK
172	Papanasam	Vacant	
173	Thiruvaiyaru	Durai Chandrashekaran	DMK
174	Thanjavur	T. K. G. Neelamegam	DMK
175	Orathanadu	M. Ramchandran	DMK
176	Pattukkottai	V. Sekar	AIADMK
177	Peravurani	M. Govindarasu	AIADMK
Pudukottai District
178	Gandharvakottai (SC)	B. Arumugam	AIADMK
179	Viralimalai	C. Vijaya Baskar	AIADMK
180	Pudukkottai	Periyannan Arassu	DMK
181	Thirumayam	S. Regupathy	DMK
182	Alangudi	Siva V. Meyyanathan	DMK
183	Aranthangi	E. Rathinasabhapathy	AIADMK
Sivaganga District
184	Karaikudi	K. R. Ramasamy	INC
185	Tiruppattur, Sivaganga	K. R. Periyakaruppan	DMK
186	Sivaganga	G. Baskaran	AIADMK
187	Manamadurai (SC)	S. Nagarajan	AIADMK
Madurai District
188	Melur	Periyapullan alias P. Selvam	AIADMK
189	Madurai East	P. Moorthy	DMK
190	Sholavandan (SC)	K. Manickam	AIADMK
191	Madurai North	V. V. Rajan Chellappa	AIADMK
192	Madurai South	S. S. Saravanan	AIADMK
193	Madurai Central	Palanivel Thiagarajan	DMK
194	Madurai West	K. Raju	AIADMK
195	Thiruparankundram	P. Saravanan	DMK
196	Tirumangalam	R. B. Udhayakumar	AIADMK
197	Usilampatti	P. Neethipathi	AIADMK
Theni District
198	Andipatti	A. Maharajan	DMK
199	Periyakulam (SC)	K. S. Saravanakumar	DMK
200	Bodinayakanur	O. Panneerselvam	AIADMK
201	Cumbum	S. T. K. Jakkaiyan	AIADMK
Virudhunagar District
202	Rajapalayam	S. Thangappandian	DMK
203	Srivilliputhur (SC)	M. Chandra Prabha	AIADMK
204	Sattur	M. S. R. Rajavarman	AIADMK
205	Sivakasi	K. T. Rajenthra Bhalaji	AIADMK
206	Virudhunagar	A. R. R. Seenivasan	DMK
207	Aruppukkottai	K. K. S. S. R. Ramachandran	DMK
208	Tiruchuli	T. Thangam Thenarasu	DMK
Ramanathapuram District
209	Paramakudi (SC)	N. Sadhan Prabhakar	AIADMK
210	Tiruvadanai	Karunas	AIADMK
211	Ramanathapuram	M. Manikandan	AIADMK
212	Mudhukulathur	S. Pandi	INC
Thoothukudi District
213	Vilathikulam	P. Chinnappan	AIADMK
214	Thoothukkudi	P. Geetha Jeevan	DMK
215	Tiruchendur	Anitha R. Radhakrishnan	DMK
216	Srivaikuntam	S. P. Shanmuganathan	AIADMK
217	Ottapidaram (SC)	C. Shanmugaiah	DMK
218	Kovilpatti	C. Kadambur Raju	AIADMK
Tenkasi District
219	Sankarankovil (SC)	V. M. Rajalakshmi	AIADMK
220	Vasudevanallur (SC)	A. Manoharan	AIADMK
221	Kadayanallur	K. A. M. Muhammed Abubacker	IUML
222	Tenkasi	S. Selvamohandas Pandian	AIADMK
223	Alangulam	Poongothai Aladi Aruna	DMK
Tirunelveli District
224	Tirunelveli	A. L. S. Lakshmanan	DMK
225	Ambasamudram	R. Murugaiah Pandian	AIADMK
226	Palayamkottai	T. P. M. Mohideen Khan	DMK
227	Nanguneri	V. Narayanan	AIADMK
228	Radhapuram	I. S. Inbadurai	AIADMK
Kanniyakumari District
229	Kanniyakumari	S. Austin	DMK
230	Nagercoil	N. Suresh Rajan	DMK
231	Colachal	J. G. Prince	INC
232	Padmanabhapuram	T. Mano Thangaraj	DMK
233	Vilavancode	S. Vijayadharani	INC
234	Killiyoor	S. Rajesh Kumar	INC
235	Anglo-Indian	Nancy Ann Cynthia Francis	Nominated

== Important events ==
On 18 September 2017, the Speaker of the Assembly disqualified 18 dissident AIADMK MLAs.

T. T. V. Dhinakaran was elected as an independent candidate from Dr. Radhakrishnan Nagar constituency in the bye-election held on 21 December 2017.

On 7 January 2019, Tamil Nadu sports minister P Balakrishna Reddy sentenced to three years in 1998 riot case, steps down.

H.Vasanthakumar elected as Member of Parliament in 2019 election,

K K Selvam Joined BJP on 6 August 2020

== See also ==
- Government of Tamil Nadu
- List of chief ministers of Tamil Nadu
- Legislative assembly of Tamil Nadu
