= T. N. Sivasubramanian =

- தோ. ந. சிவசுப்பிரமணியன்

Member of the Tamil Nadu Legislative Assembly
- In office 2001–2006
- Preceded by: Vasuki Murugesan
- Succeeded by: V. Senthil Balaji
- Constituency: Karur

Personal details
- Born: 15 April 1949 (age 76) Karur, Tamil Nadu, India
- Party: Dravida Munnetra Kazhagam
- Education: B.E. (Bachelor of Engineering)
- Profession: Farmer

T. N. Sivasubramanian is an Indian politician and a former Member of the Legislative Assembly (MLA) of Tamil Nadu. Hailing from the Pugalur region of Karur district, he holds a Bachelor's degree in Engineering (B.E.). Representing the Indian National Congress party, he contested and won the 2006 Tamil Nadu Legislative Assembly election from the Karur Assembly constituency.

== Election Performance ==
=== 2001 ===
2001 Tamil Nadu Legislative Assembly election: Karur
Party	Candidate	Votes	%	±%
INC	T. N. Sivasubramanian	82,012	53.36	
DMK	Vasuki Murugesan	58,574	38.11	−15.76
MDMK	R. Natarajan	6,769	4.40	−5.70
Independent	Kamaraj	2,735	1.78	
Independent	S. Yakup	1,695	1.10	
JD(S)	N. Natarajan	738	0.48	
Independent	N. Suresh	544	0.35	
Independent	K. Palanisamy	366	0.24	
Independent	K. Subramani	264	0.17	
Margin of victory		23,438	15.25	−6.49
Turnout		153,697	64.17	−5.74
Registered electors		239,674		
INC gain from DMK		Swing	-0.51	
