= K. Vadivel =

Indian politician

K. Vadivel (also known as Ku. Vadivel) is an Indian politician and former Member of the Legislative Assembly of Tamil Nadu. He was elected to the Tamil Nadu legislative assembly as the Anna Dravida Munnetra Kazhagam candidate for Karur in the 1977 and 1984 elections. He is the founder of Rasammal Educational Institutions, Karur. In 2024, he joined the Bharatiya Janata Party in the presence of Tamil Nadu BJP chief K. Annamalai and Rajeev Chandrasekhar.
