= Vasuki Murugesan =

Indian politician

Vasuki Murugesan (died 2009) was elected to the Tamil Nadu Legislative Assembly from the Karur constituency in the 1996 elections. She was a candidate of the Dravida Munnetra Kazhagam (DMK) party.

Murugesan died in 2009.

== Tamil Nadu Legislative Assembly Elections ==
Elections	Constituency	Party	Result	Vote percentage	Opposition Candidate	Opposition Party	Opposition vote percentage
1991 Tamil Nadu Legislative Assembly election	Karur	DMK	Lost	32.77	M. Chinnasamy	AIADMK	64.69
1996 Tamil Nadu Legislative Assembly election	Karur	DMK	Won	53.87	M. Chinnasamy	AIADMK	32.13
2001 Tamil Nadu Legislative Assembly election	Karur	DMK	Lost	38.11	T. N. Sivasubramanian	INC	53.36
2006 Tamil Nadu Legislative Assembly election	Karur	DMK	Lost	43.84	V. Senthil Balaji	AIADMK	47.00
