= T. M. Nallaswamy =

Indian politician

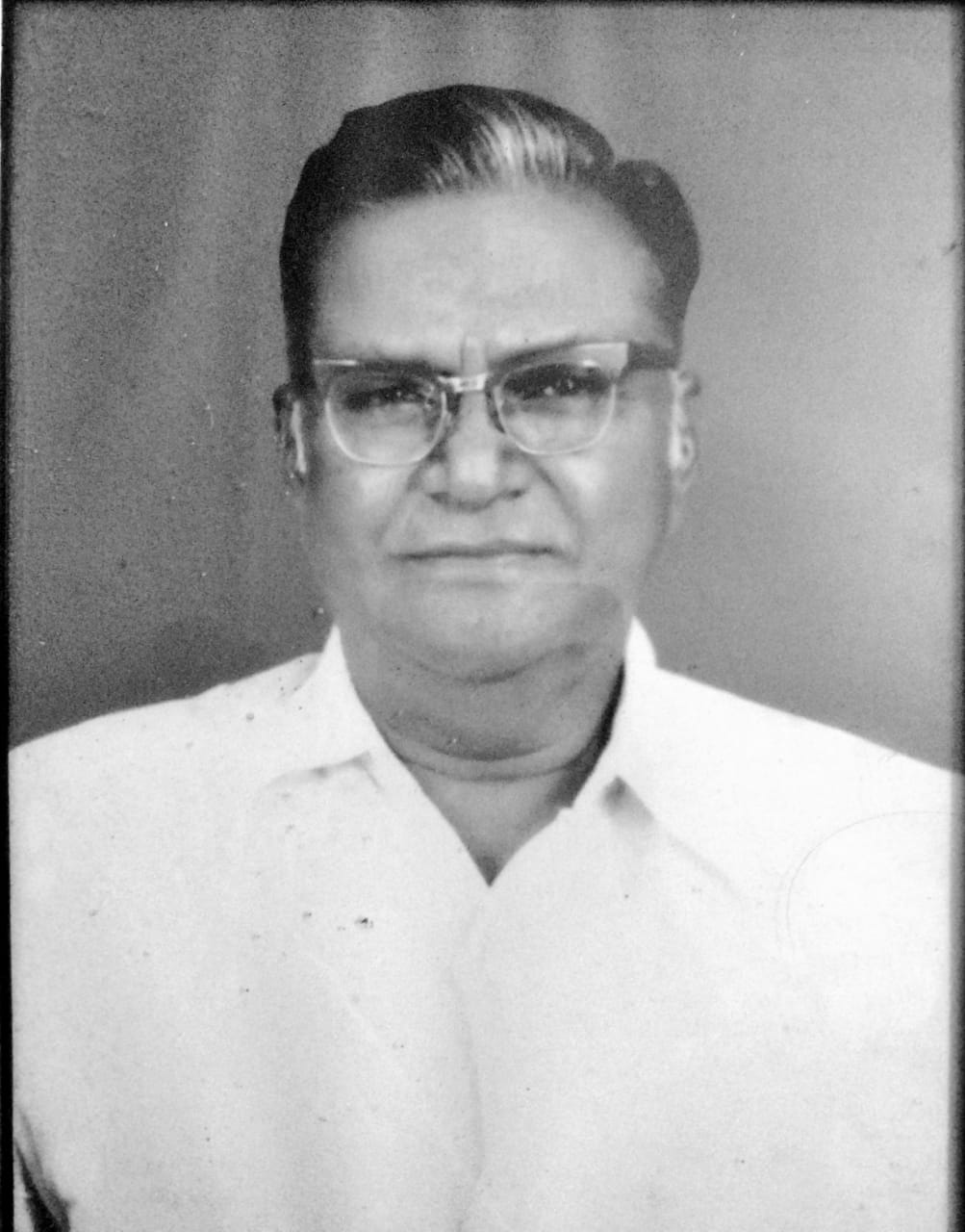

Member of State Legislative Assembly, Tamil Nadu, India
- In office 1957–1971
- Nominated by: Perunthalaivar K.Kamaraj
- First Minister: K.Kamaraj (CM) C.N.Anna Durai (CM) V.R.Nedunchezhiyan (Acting CM) M.Karunanidhi (CM)
- Constituency: Karur, Tiruchirappalli District

President, District Board, Tiruchirapalli District, Tamil Nadu, India
- In office 1954–1957

Personal details
- Born: 2 September 1924, Thottakurichi, Karur Taluka, Tiruchirappalli District (Madras Presidency, British Rule)
- Died: 30 September 2005
- Party: Indian National Congress (INC)
- Spouse: Ponnammal
- Profession: Agriculturist, Politician

Thottakurichi Muthuswamy Nallaswamy, (2 September 1924 – 30 September 2005) popularly known as T.M.N, was an Indian politician and Member of the Legislative Assembly of Tamil Nadu. He was elected to the 2nd, 3rd & 4th Madras State Legislative Assemblies, later renamed Tamil Nadu Legislative Assembly, as an Indian National Congress candidate from Karur constituency in the Madras State Legislative Assembly elections in 1957, 1962 and 1967.

TMN is remembered for his achievements in the implementation of several agriculture irrigation & development schemes in Karur constituency, and obtaining sanction for establishing numerous government schools for the first time in Tiruchirappalli District in the 1950s and 1960s. He took great initiative in the agricultural development of his constituency, with the cause of farmers being his prime endeavor and key purpose in public life.

== Early life ==
Nallaswamy, was born in an agricultural family in 1924 at Thottakurichi, a village near Karur, Tamil Nadu, India (the then Madras Presidency) as the second child to M. Muthuswamy Gounder and wife Raasaayi Ammal. His paternal grandfather was Malayanna Gounder. He completed his schooling in 1940, obtaining his secondary school-leaving certificate at Municipal High School, Karur. He then moved to Trichy to study the "intermediate" course at St. Joseph's College, Trichy, which he could not complete due to family circumstances.

== Career ==
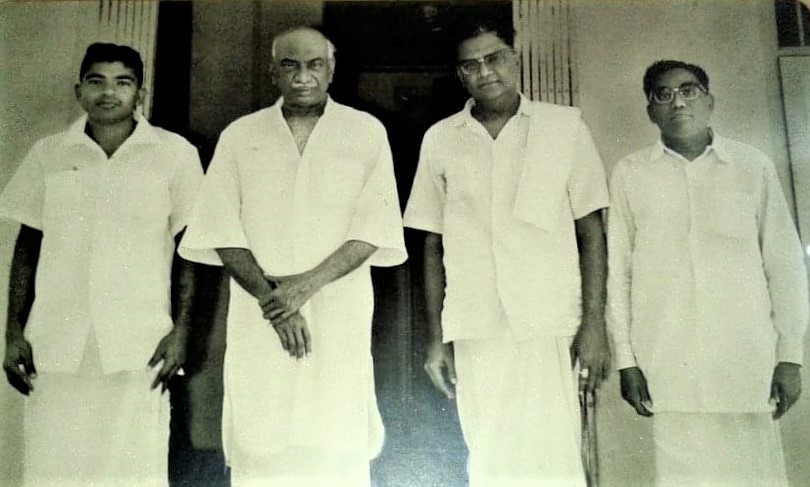
T.M.N seen with Chief Minister K.Kamaraj and INC colleague S. Murugaiyan

TMN's political career began in 1952 when he contested in the Madras State Legislative Assembly election from Aravakurichi constituency which he lost to N. Rathina Gounder.

TMN then served as president, District Board, Tiruchirappalli district (comprising the present Trichy, Ariyalur, Perambalur and Karur districts) from 1954 to 1957. During his tenure as MLA in 1962, TMN was chairman of Tamil Nadu Legislature House Committee on Estimates.

He served as secretary, Tamil Nadu Sugarcane Growers Federation and was founder, Pugalur Sugarcane Growers Association, Trichy District. He also served as chairman, Tiruchirappalli District Co-operative Spinning Mills, Karur 1964 to 1967.

T. M. Nallaswamy was elected as an Indian National Congress candidate in the 1957, 1962 and 1967 state assemblies.

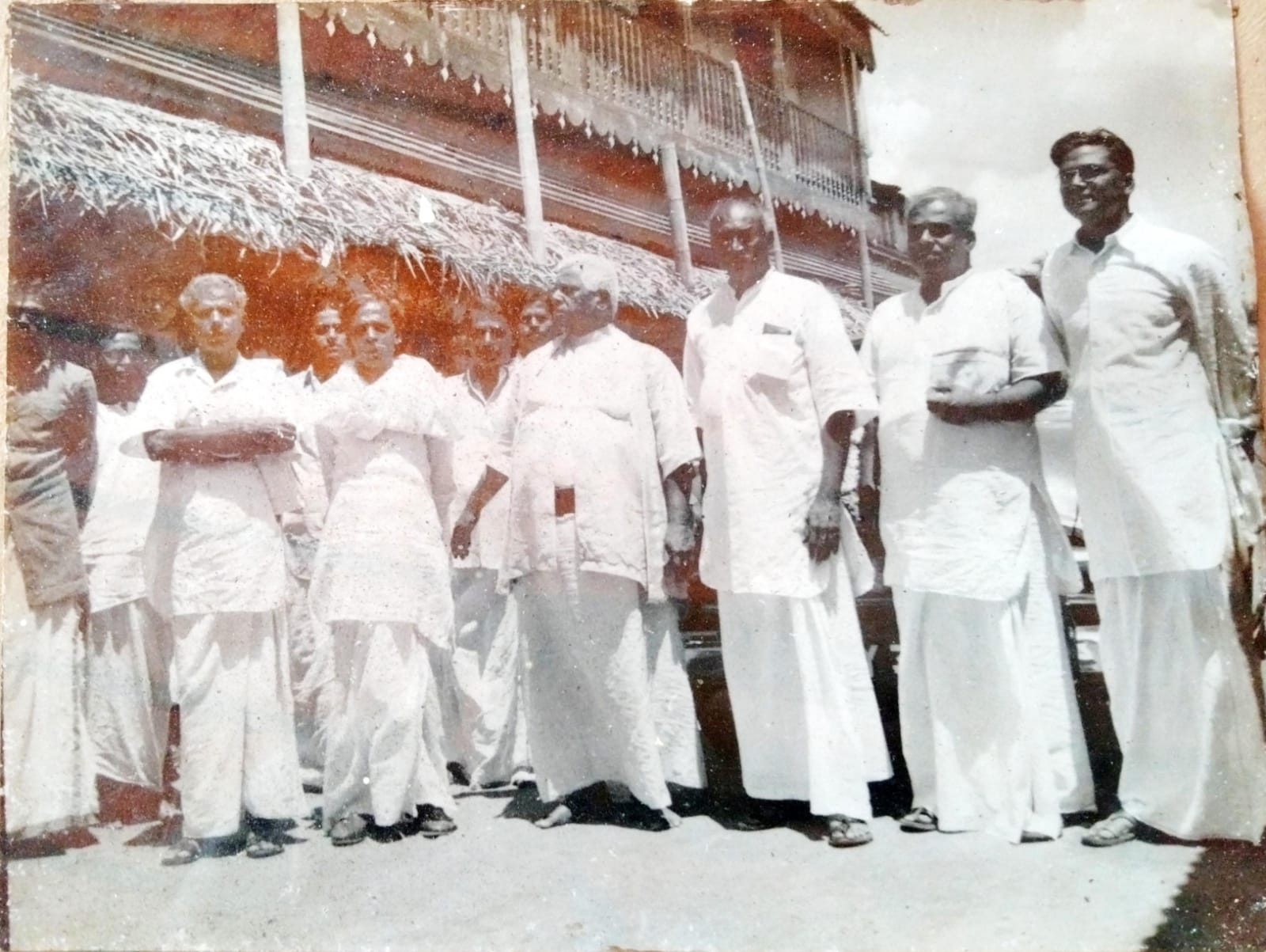
T.M.N (seen extreme right) with CM. K.Kamaraj & Colleagues in the 1960s

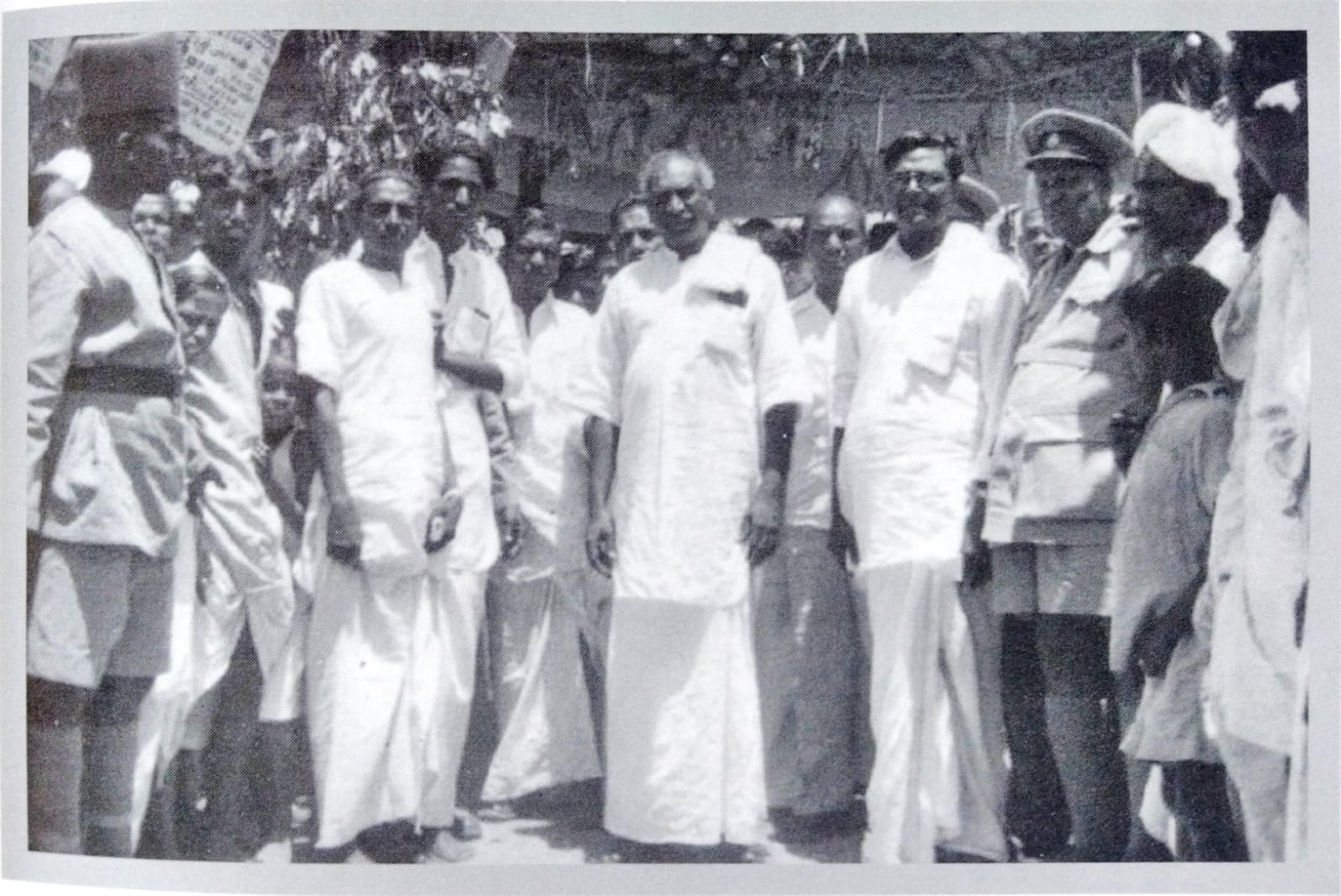
T.M.N with CM. K.Kamaraj during a visit to the constituency 1960s

== Electoral performance ==
Election	Constituency	Political party	Result	Vote %	Opposition			Ref
Election	Constituency	Political party	Result	Vote %	Candidate	Political party	Vote %	Ref
1952	Aravakurichi	INC	Lost	33.40%	N. Rathina Gounder	Independent	56.50%	
1957	Karur	INC	Won	59.87%	K. S. Ramasamy	CPI	20.03%	
1962	Karur	INC	Won	51.02%	K. S. Ramasamy	CPI	28.59%	
1967	Karur	INC	Won	44.95%	S. Nallasamy	CPI(M)	38.42%	
1971	Karur	INC	Lost	43.45%	S. Nallasamy	DMK	56.55%	
