= M. Chinnasamy =

Indian politician

M. Chinnasamy is an Indian politician and former Minister and Member of the Legislative Assembly of Tamil Nadu.He was elected to the Tamil Nadu legislative assembly as an Anna Dravida Munnetra Kazhagam candidate from Karur constituency in 1980, and 1991 elections.He served as the Minister of Industries, Environment and Pollution Control of Tamil Nadu during (1993–1996). He is elected as a Member of Parliament to the 13th Lok Sabha in i.e.,(1999–2004) from Karur.
