= M. R. Vijayabhaskar =

Indian politician

Cabinet Minister Government of Tamil Nadu
- In office 23 May 2016 – 7 May 2021
- Minister: Minister of Transport
- Chief Minister: J. Jayalalithaa; O. Panneerselvam; Edappadi K. Palaniswamy
- Preceded by: V. Senthil Balaji
- Succeeded by: S. S. Sivasankar

Member of the Tamil Nadu Legislative Assembly
- In office 11 May 2026 – 29 June 2026
- Preceded by: V. Senthilbalaji
- Constituency: Karur
- In office 19 May 2016 – 12 May 2021
- Preceded by: V. Senthilbalaji
- Succeeded by: V. Senthilbalaji
- Constituency: Karur

Personal details
- Party: Tamilaga Vettri Kazhagam (Since 2 July 2026)
- Other political affiliations: All India Anna Dravida Munnetra Kazhagam (Before 2 July 2026)

M. R. Vijayabhaskar (also known as MRV) is an Indian politician and a member of the 15th Tamil Nadu Legislative Assembly. He was elected from Karur constituency as a candidate of the AIADMK. He inculcated the rule to carry driving licenses compulsory.

Jayalalithaa appointed Vijayabhaskar as Minister for Transport in May 2016. This was his first cabinet post in the Government of Tamil Nadu.

In Karur, Vijayabaskar suffered defeat with a margin of 12,448 to DMK's V. Senthil Balaji in 2021 Tamil Nadu Assembly elections.

In Karur constituency, in 2026 Tamil Nadu Assembly elections, he beat V. P. Mathiyazhagan of TVK and R. Thyagarajan of DMK in a closely fought electoral battle by securing 71,542 votes. After becoming the MLA in 2026 he sided along the rebels of AIADMK led by C.V.Shanmugam and offered his support to TVK.

Vijayabhaskar met Speaker JCD Prabhakar on 29 June 2026 and tendered his resignation as MLA. On 2 July 2026, he joined Tamilaga Vettri Kazhagam.

== Tamil Nadu Legislative Assembly Elections ==
Elections	Constituency	Party	Result	Vote percentage	Opposition Candidate	Opposition Party	Opposition vote percentage
2016 Tamil Nadu Legislative Assembly election	Karur	AIADMK	Won	43.86	Bank K. Subramanian	INC	43.62
2021 Tamil Nadu Legislative Assembly election	Karur	AIADMK	Lost	43.28	V. Senthil Balaji	DMK	49.31
2026 Tamil Nadu Legislative Assembly election	Karur	AIADMK	Won	32.99	V. P. Mathiyazhagan	TVK	32.15

== Legal Challenges ==
- Over INR 100 Crores in Land Grabbing and Kidnapping Cases (2024) - he was arrested by the CB-CID in Thrissur, Kerala, in July 2024 and granted conditional bail
- Cheating Case (Sub-Registrar Complaint) - he provided a non-traceable certificate for land documents - July 2021
- Disproportionate Assets Case (2021) - The FIR named his wife, Vijayalakshmi, and brother, Sekar, as co-accused for allegedly aiding and abetting the accumulation of wealth.
- Election-Related Case (2021) - Violating Model Code of Conduct (MCC)

He has consistently maintained that these cases are "politically motivated" and part of a "vendetta" by the ruling DMK government to tarnish his reputation.
