= Udumalai K. Radhakrishnan =

Indian politician

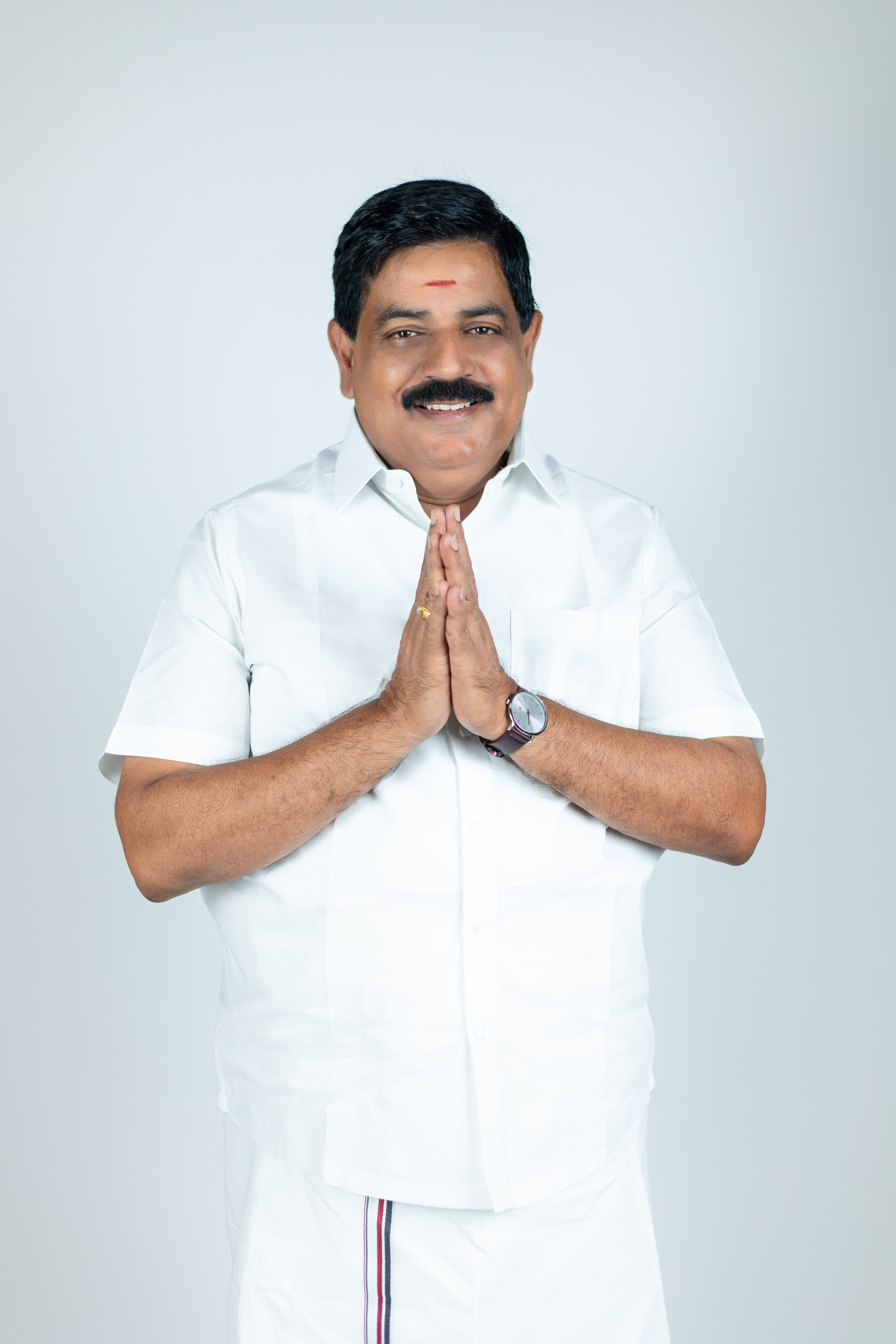

Member of the Tamil Nadu Legislative Assembly
- In office 16 May 2016 – 6 May 2026
- Preceded by: V. Jayaraman
- Succeeded by: M. Jeyakumar
- Constituency: Udumalaipettai

Minister for Animal Husbandry
- In office August 2017 – May 2021
- Preceded by: P. Balakrishna Reddy

Minister for Housing and Urban Development
- In office May 2016 – August 2017
- Preceded by: R. Vaithilingam
- Succeeded by: O. Panneerselvam

Chairman of Tamil Nadu Arasu Cable TV Corporation Limited
- In office July 2011 – May 2016
- Preceded by: Position established
- Succeeded by: M. Manikandan (politician)
- In office July 2019 – July 2021
- Preceded by: M. Manikandan (politician)

Personal details
- Born: Radhakrishnan; 16 December 1965 (age 60) Pollachi, Tamil Nadu
- Party: Tamilaga Vettri Kazhagam (since June 2026)
- Other political affiliations: All India Anna Dravida Munnetra Kazhagam
- Education: B.Com.
- Alma mater: Nallamuthu Gounder Mahalingam College
- Website: Udumalai K. Radhakrishnan

Udumalai K. Radhakrishnan is an Indian politician and a member of the 15th Tamil Nadu Legislative Assembly. He was elected from the Udumalpet constituency as a candidate of the AIADMK party. He served as the Chairman of Tamil Nadu Arasu Cable TV Corporation Limited from 2011 to 2016. Again he was appointed the Chairman of Tamil Nadu Arasu Cable TV Corporation Limited in July 2019.

Jayalalithaa appointed Radhakrishnan as Minister for Housing and Urban Development in May 2016. This was his first cabinet post.

In April 2017, Radhakrishnan was one of three AIADMK ministers against whom police filed a First Information Report after allegations of obstructing officials who were conducting raids related to income tax. He and R. Kamaraj were alleged to have done so at the house of the Minister for Health, C. Vijayabhaskar.

Following the 2026 Tamil Nadu Legislative Assembly election, Radhakrishnan has joined TVK in June 2026.

== Personal life ==
Radhakrishnan was born on 16 December 1965 at Pollachi, Coimbatore district, Madras State (present-day Tamil Nadu). After completing school, he completed B.Com from Nallamuthu Gounder Mahalingam College. He is married to Krishna Brindha Radhakrishnan and has one daughter and one son. He is a cable TV operator and agriculturist by occupation.

== Elections contested ==
=== Tamil Nadu Legislative elections ===
Elections	Constituency	Party	Result	Vote percentage	Opposition Candidate	Opposition Party	Opposition vote percentage
2016 Tamil Nadu Legislative Assembly election	Udumalpet	AIADMK	Won	44.73	Muthu K	DMK	41.62
2021 Tamil Nadu Legislative Assembly election	Udumalpet	AIADMK	Won	49.85	Thennarasu K	INC	38.59
