= V. Senthil Balaji =

Indian politician (born 1975)

V.Senthil Balaji
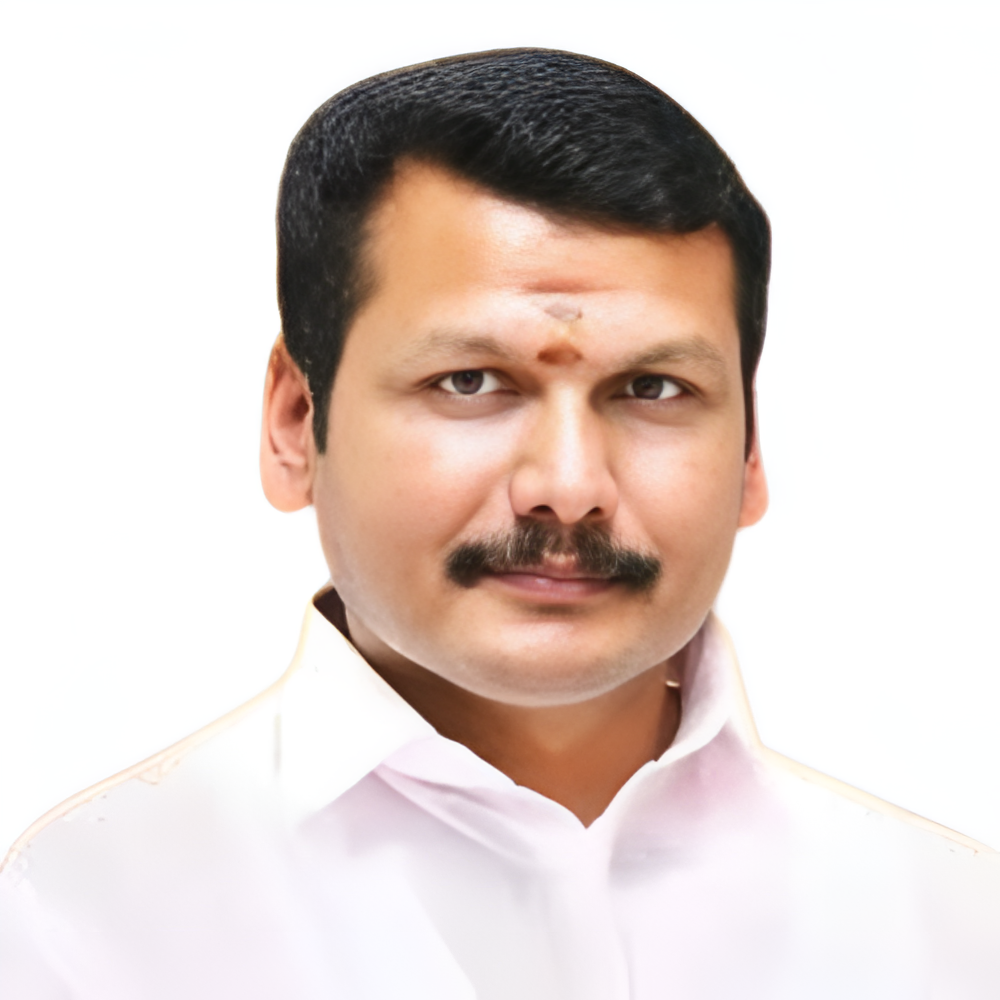
- Official portrait of V. Sendhil Balaji

Member of the Tamil Nadu Legislative Assembly
- Incumbent
- Assumed office 05 May 2026
- Constituency: Coimbatore South

Minister for Electricity and Prohibition & Excise (Tamil Nadu)
- In office 28 September 2024 – 27 April 2025
- Chief Minister: M. K. Stalin
- Preceded by: Thangam Thennarasu (Electricity); S. Muthusamy (Prohibition & Excise)
- Succeeded by: S. S. Sivasankar (Electricity); S. Muthusamy (Prohibition & Excise)
- In office 7 May 2021 – 16 June 2023
- Chief Minister: M. K. Stalin
- Preceded by: P. Thangamani
- Succeeded by: Thangam Thennarasu(Electricity); S. Muthusamy (Prohibition & Excise)

Minister Without Portfolio (Tamil Nadu)
- In office 16 June 2023 – 12 February 2024

Minister for Transport (Tamil Nadu)
- In office 16 May 2011 – 28 July 2015
- Chief Minister: J. Jayalalithaa; O. Panneerselvam; J. Jayalalithaa
- Preceded by: K. N. Nehru
- Succeeded by: P. Thangamani

Member of the Tamil Nadu Legislative Assembly
- Incumbent
- Assumed office 4 May 2026
- Constituency: Coimbatore South
- In office 2 May 2021 – 5 May 2026
- Constituency: Karur
- In office 23 May 2019 – 2 May 2021
- Constituency: Aravakurichi
- In office November 2016 – September 2018
- Constituency: Aravakurichi
- In office 11 May 2006 – 20 May 2016
- Constituency: Karur

Personal details
- Born: 21 October 1975 (age 50) Karur, Tamil Nadu, India
- Party: Dravida Munnetra Kazhagam (1996 - 2000 & 2018-present)
- Other political affiliations: All India Anna Dravida Munnetra Kazhagam (2000-2017)
- Spouse: Megala Senthilbalaji
- Children: 1 Daughter
- Education: B.Com.
- Occupation: Politician Businessman
- Website: https://senthilbalaji.in/

V. Senthil Balaji (born 21 October 1975) is an Indian politician and former Cabinet Minister of Government of Tamil Nadu. He was elected to the Tamil Nadu legislative Assembly as an Anna Dravida Munnetra Kazhagam candidate from Karur in 2006, 2011 and as Dravida Munnetra Kazhagam candidate in 2021 election. Also he was elected from Aravakurichi constituency in 2016 from ADMK ticket and as DMK candidate in 2019 by election. He served as Transport Minister in Jayalalitha cabinet formed after 2011 election.

== Early life ==
V Senthil Balaji was born on 21 October 1975 in Rameswarapatti in Karur district. He hails from an agricultural background. He has completed his high school & Higher Secondary school studies from Rameswarapatti Govt. School, Vivekananda School, Pasupathypalayam and Municipal Higher Secondary school, Karur. He entered politics at the age of 21 and was active since early 2000s.

== Politics ==
In 1997 he began his public service as a local body member. He was the Minister for Transport of the Government of Tamil Nadu from 2011 to 2015. He was dropped from cabinet in July 2015. As a cadre of Anna Dravida Munnetra Kazhagam, he was previously elected to the same Karur constituency in 2006 general elections. He was elected as a MLA from Aravakurichi constituency in 2016. After the demise of Jayalalithaa he played a key role in saving the government. When AIADMK separated into factions he stood by T. T. V. Dhinakaran. On 18 September 2017, 18 MLA's were disqualified by the speaker P. Dhanapal for their petition to the Governor Mr. Banwarilal Purohit to change the Chief Minister. He joined the Dravida Munnetra Kazhagam (DMK), in the presence of Party President M. K. Stalin on 14 December 2018. Soon after joining the party he was offered District Secretary post and later was announced as by-election candidate for Aravakurichi constituency. He was elected as a MLA on 23 May 2019 for fourth time. He serves as a member of the Tamil Nadu legislative assembly. He won the election held in the month of April 2021.

=== Arrest ===
On 14 June 2023, the Enforcement Directorate arrested Senthil Balaji during raids in Chennai and Coimbatore, linked to a money laundering case from his tenure as Transport Minister (2011–2015) in the AIADMK government. He was placed in judicial custody and later hospitalized due to "chest pain". Balaji resigned in February 2024 but was reinstated as minister after his release in September 2024.

== Ministry ==
Designation	Portfolio	Party	Chief Minister	To	
Designation	Portfolio	Party	Chief Minister	Took office	Left office
Tamil Nadu Minister of Transport	Transport, Nationalised Transport, Motor Vehicles Act	AIADMK	J.Jayalalithaa	16 May 2011	27 September 2014
Tamil Nadu Minister of Transport	Transport, Nationalised Transport, Motor Vehicles Act	AIADMK	O. Panneerselvam	28 September 2014	23 May 2015
Tamil Nadu Minister of Transport	Transport, Nationalised Transport, Motor Vehicles Act	AIADMK	J.Jayalalithaa	23 May 2015	28 July 2015
Tamil Nadu Minister for Electricity, Prohibition & Excise	Electricity, Non-Conventional Energy, Prohibition & Excise, Molasses	DMK	M.K.Stalin	7 May 2021	16 June 2023
Tamil Nadu Minister for Electricity, Prohibition & Excise	Electricity, Non-Conventional Energy, Prohibition & Excise, Molasses	DMK	M.K.Stalin	28 September 2024	28 April 2025

== Electoral performance ==
=== Tamil Nadu Legislative Assembly Elections ===
Elections	Constituency	Party	Result	Vote percentage	Opposition Candidate	Opposition Party	Opposition vote percentage
2006 Tamil Nadu Legislative Assembly election	Karur	AIADMK	Won	46.00	Vasuki Murugesan	DMK	43.84
2011 Tamil Nadu Legislative Assembly election	Karur	AIADMK	Won	61.18	S.Jothimani	INC	34.10
2016 Tamil Nadu Legislative Assembly election	Aravakurichi	AIADMK	Won	53.51	K. C. Palanisamy	DMK	39.13
2019 Tamil Nadu Legislative Assembly by-elections	Aravakurichi	DMK	Won	56.45	V. V. Senthil Nathan	AIADMK	34.54
2021 Tamil Nadu Legislative Assembly election	Karur	DMK	Won	49.31	M. R. Vijayabhaskar	AIADMK	43.28
2026 Tamil Nadu Legislative Assembly election	Coimbatore (South)	DMK	Won	38.16	V. Senthilkumar	TVK	36.71
