= Vellamandi N. Natarajan =

Indian politician

Vellakundi N. Natarajan is an Indian politician and a member of the 15th Tamil Nadu Legislative Assembly of Tamil Nadu. In 2016, he got elected from Tiruchirappalli (East) constituency as a candidate of the All India Anna Dravida Munnetra Kazhagam (AIADMK).

Jayalalithaa appointed Natarajan as Minister for Tourism in May 2016. This was his first cabinet post in the Government of Tamil Nadu.

He joined Tamilaga Vettri Kazhagam after quitting All India Anna Dravida Munnetra Kazhagam on 27 May 2026.
