= M. Manikandan (politician) =

Indian politician

M.Manikandan

Minister of Information Technology in Government of Tamil Nadu
- In office 23 May 2016 – 7 August 2019
- Chief Minister: J. Jayalalithaa, O. Panneerselvam, Edappadi K. Palaniswami
- Constituency: Ramanathapuram

Personal details
- Party: All India Anna Dravida Munnetra Kazhagam

Dr M. Manikandan is an Indian politician and a member of the 15th Tamil Nadu Legislative Assembly. He was elected from Ramanathapuram constituency as a candidate of the AIADMK.

Jayalalithaa appointed Manikandan as Minister for Information Technology in May 2016. This was his first cabinet post in the Government of Tamil Nadu.
