= V. Saroja =

Indian politician

Dr. V. Saroja
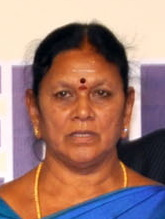

Minister for Social Welfare and Nutritious Noon Meal Programme
- In office 23 May 2016 – 2 May 2021
- Chief Minister: J.Jayalalithaa; O. Panneerselvam; Edappadi K. Palaniswami
- Preceded by: B. Valarmathi
- Succeeded by: P. Geetha Jeevan

Chairperson – Tamil Nadu Adi Dravidar Housing & Development Corporation Ltd
- In office 2004–2006

Member of Parliament
- In office 10 March 1998 – 16 May 2004
- Constituency: Rasipuram constituency

Member of the Legislative Assembly
- In office 24 May 2016 – 2 May 2021
- Constituency: Rasipuram
- In office 24 June 1991 – 12 May 1996
- Constituency: Sankagiri

Personal details
- Born: 12 June 1948 (age 78) Unjanoor, Salem district, Tamil Nadu
- Party: All India Anna Dravida Munnetra Kazhagam (AIADMK)
- Spouse: Dr. Lokaranjan Loganathan
- Children: 1
- Education: M.B.B.S., M.D., D.G.O.

Vellayan Saroja (born 12 June 1948) is an Indian politician, medical doctor, social worker and former cabinet minister of Social Welfare & Nutritious Noon meal Programme from Tamil Nadu. She was elected twice to the 12th Lok Sabha and 13th Lok Sabha from Rasipuram constituency as an All India Anna Dravida Munnetra Kazhagam candidate in 1998, and 1999 elections.

== Early life and education ==
Dr. V. Saroja was born in Ujanur which belongs to the district of Salem in Tamil Nadu on 12 June 1948 to Shri M. Vellayan and Smt. Kandammal.

Dr. Saroja did her bachelors M.B.B.S. from Stanley Medical College and earned masters M.D. from Madras Medical College.

== Political career ==
Dr. V. Saroja entered into the politics in 1989 and joined AIADMK. She was elected as Member of the Legislative Assembly (India) in 1991 Tamil Nadu Legislative Assembly election. In 1998, she was elected as Member of parliament for 12th Lok Sabha. In 1999, Dr. Saroja was re-elected as Member of parliament for 13th Lok Sabha. She also served as secretary of AIADMK Parliamentary Party, Lok Sabha. From 2000 to 2001 she served as the member of Committee on the Empowerment of Women. From 2000 to 2004 she served as the member of Consultative Committee, Ministry of Finance. She is also the former State Information Commissioner of Tamil Nadu.

Jayalalithaa appointed Saroja as Minister for Social Welfare and Nutritious Noon Meal Programme in May 2016. This was her first cabinet post in the Government of Tamil Nadu. Dr. V Saroja won with highest number of votes in 2016 Rasipuram Assembly Election.

Dr. V Saroja, visited a number of countries while serving the nation as a politician. In June 2000, Dr. Saroja went to New York City, United States of America, and joined "BEIJING +5" Special Session at United Nations General Assembly as a member of Parliamentary Delegation. She also visited Australia and New Zealand as a member of Goodwill delegation of WHIPS of Political parties.

In March 2002, Dr Saroja attended 18th Asian Parliamentarians Meeting on Population and Development in Tokyo, Japan.

== Positions held ==
#	From	To	Position	Comments
01	1991	1996	Member of the Legislative Assembly (India)	elected
02	1992	1996	Joint Secretary, Women's Wing, Salem District	
03	1998	1999	Member of parliament for 12th Lok Sabha	elected
04	1999	2000	Member of parliament for 13th Lok Sabha	re-elected
05	2004	2006	Chairperson of Tamil Nadu Adi Dravidar Housing & Development Corporation Ltd.	
06	2007	2010	District Joint Secretary, AIADMK, Nammakal district	
07	2010	2013	Joint Secretary, Women's Wing, AIADMK	
08	2012	2013	State Information Commissioner	Appointed
09	2016	2021	Minister for Social Welfare and Nutritious Noon Meal Programme (Government of Tamil Nadu)	elected

== Personal life ==
In 1975 she was married with Dr. L. Lokaranjan, having one daughter.
