= Karur Assembly constituency =

One of the 234 State Legislative Assembly Constituencies in Tamil Nadu, in India

Coordinates: 10.95°N 78.08°E

Karur
- Constituency No. 135 for the Tamil Nadu Legislative Assembly

Constituency details
- Country: India
- Region: South India
- State: Tamil Nadu
- District: Karur
- Lok Sabha constituency: Karur
- Established: 1951
- Total electors: 2,30,068
- Reservation: None

Member of Legislative Assembly
- 17th Tamil Nadu Legislative Assembly
- Incumbent Vacant

Karur is a state assembly constituency in Karur district in Tamil Nadu. Its State Assembly Constituency number is 135. It comes under Karur Lok Sabha constituency. It is one of the 234 State Legislative Assembly Constituencies in Tamil Nadu, India.

== Demographics ==
Kongu Vellalar Gounder 27%, Senguntha Mudaliar 25% and Vettuva Gounder 16% communities are numerically high in this constituency.

== Members of Legislative Assembly ==
=== Madras State ===
Year	Winner	Party
1952	M. Manickasundaram	Independent
1957	T. M. Nallaswamy	Indian National Congress
1962	T. M. Nallaswamy	Indian National Congress
1967	T. M. Nallaswamy	Indian National Congress

=== Tamil Nadu ===
Year	Winner	Party
1971	S. Nallasamy	Dravida Munnetra Kazhagam
1977	K. Vadivel	All India Anna Dravida Munnetra Kazhagam
1980	M. Chinnasamy	All India Anna Dravida Munnetra Kazhagam
1984	K. Vadivel	All India Anna Dravida Munnetra Kazhagam
1989	K. V. Ramasamy	Dravida Munnetra Kazhagam
1991	M. Chinnasamy	All India Anna Dravida Munnetra Kazhagam
1996	Vasuki Murugesan	Dravida Munnetra Kazhagam
2001	T. N. Sivasubramanian	Indian National Congress
2006	V. Senthilbalaji	All India Anna Dravida Munnetra Kazhagam
2011	V. Senthilbalaji	All India Anna Dravida Munnetra Kazhagam
2016	M. R. Vijayabhaskar	All India Anna Dravida Munnetra Kazhagam
2021	V. Senthilbalaji	Dravida Munnetra Kazhagam
2026	M. R. Vijayabhaskar	All India Anna Dravida Munnetra Kazhagam

== Election results ==
Vote share of winning candidates
2026	32.99%
2021	49.31%
2016	43.86%
2011	61.18%
2006	47.00%
2001	53.36%
1996	53.87%
1991	64.69%
1989	38.34%
1984	54.35%
1980	50.79%
1977	35.11%
1971	56.55%
1967	44.95%
1962	51.02%
1957	59.87%
1952	20.72%

=== 2026 By-election ===
2026 Tamil Nadu Legislative Assembly Bye-election: Karur
Party	Candidate	Votes	%	±%
TVK				
DMK				
AIADMK				
NTK				
Other parties	Other party candidates			
Independent	Independent candidates			
NOTA	None of the above			
Margin of victory				
Turnout				
Registered electors				
gain from		Swing		

=== 2026 ===
2026 Tamil Nadu Legislative Assembly election: Karur
Party	Candidate	Votes	%	±%
AIADMK	M. R. Vijayabhaskar	71,542	32.99	▼10.29
TVK	V.R Mathiyalagan	69,721	32.15	New
DMK	Aasee.M. Thiagarajan	67,256	31.02	▼18.29
NTK	Karuppaiya.R	5,465	2.52	▼1.03
NOTA	NOTA	539	0.25	▼0.22
Margin of victory		1,821	0.84	▼5.19
Turnout		2,16,829	94.25	▲10.12
Registered electors		2,30,068		▼15,217
AIADMK gain from DMK		Swing	▼10.29	

=== 2021 ===
2021 Tamil Nadu Legislative Assembly election: Karur
Party	Candidate	Votes	%	±%
DMK	V. Senthil Balaji	101,757	49.31	
AIADMK	M. R. Vijayabhaskar	89,309	43.28	−0.58
NTK	R. Karuppaiya	7,316	3.55	1.96
MNM	S. Mohanraj	4,154	2.01	
NOTA	Nota	961	0.47	−1.46
DMDK	N. Thangaraj	953	0.46	−3.01
Independent	P. Ravi	369	0.18	
Independent	Anbazhagan	334	0.16	
BSP	P. Aadhikrishnan	210	0.10	−0.12
Independent	T. Kannan	165	0.08	
Independent	S. Rajeshkannan	138	0.07	
Margin of victory		12,448	6.03	5.80
Turnout		206,349	84.13	3.63
Rejected ballots		471	0.23	
Registered electors		245,285		
DMK gain from AIADMK		Swing	5.45	

=== 2016 ===
2016 Tamil Nadu Legislative Assembly election: Karur
Party	Candidate	Votes	%	±%
AIADMK	M. R. Vijayabhaskar	81,936	43.86	−17.32
INC	Bank K. Subramanian	81,495	43.62	9.52
DMDK	A. Ravi	6,491	3.47	
BJP	K. Sivasaami	3,995	2.14	0.66
NOTA	None Of The Above	3,595	1.92	
NTK	Selva. Nanmaaran	2,968	1.59	
KMDK	M. Shanmugam	1,552	0.83	
PMK	M. Murugesan	1,376	0.74	
Gandhiya Makkal Iyakkam	N. Imthiyaz Rizvi	421	0.23	
BSP	R. Boopathi	413	0.22	−0.16
Independent	P. Rajadurai	360	0.19	
Margin of victory		441	0.24	−26.84
Turnout		186,813	80.50	−3.43
Registered electors		232,072		
AIADMK hold		Swing	-17.32	

=== 2011 ===
2011 Tamil Nadu Legislative Assembly election: Karur
Party	Candidate	Votes	%	±%
AIADMK	V. Senthil Balaji	99,738	61.18	14.18
INC	S. Jothimani	55,593	34.10	
BJP	S. Sivamani	2,417	1.48	0.43
PECP	B. Ashokkumar	681	0.42	
BSP	P. Aadhikrishnan	620	0.38	−0.07
Independent	M. Loganathan	610	0.37	
Independent	P. Senthil Kumar	522	0.32	
Independent	T. Veeramani	480	0.29	
Independent	T. Venugopal	433	0.27	
Independent	C. Premkumar	393	0.24	
IJK	K. M. Periyasamy	371	0.23	
Margin of victory		44,145	27.08	23.92
Turnout		194,257	83.93	6.83
Registered electors		163,031		
AIADMK hold		Swing	14.18	

=== 2006 ===
2006 Tamil Nadu Legislative Assembly election: Karur
Party	Candidate	Votes	%	±%
AIADMK	V. Senthil Balaji	80,214	47.00	
DMK	Vasuki Murugesan	74,830	43.84	5.73
DMDK	A. Ravi	9,734	5.70	
BJP	P. K. Mohan	1,789	1.05	
Independent	M. Venkataraman	1,396	0.82	
BSP	A. S. Jeganathan	763	0.45	
Independent	Murugesan Rama	511	0.30	
SP	K. Kanagaraj	354	0.21	
Independent	M. Murugesan	349	0.20	
Independent	K. Baskaran	248	0.15	
Independent	K. P. Balusamy	120	0.07	
Margin of victory		5,384	3.15	−12.09
Turnout		170,676	77.09	12.92
Registered electors		221,389		
AIADMK gain from INC		Swing	-6.36	

=== 2001 ===
2001 Tamil Nadu Legislative Assembly election: Karur
Party	Candidate	Votes	%	±%
INC	T. N. Sivasubramanian	82,012	53.36	
DMK	Vasuki Murugesan	58,574	38.11	−15.76
MDMK	R. Natarajan	6,769	4.40	−5.70
Independent	Kamaraj	2,735	1.78	
Independent	S. Yakup	1,695	1.10	
JD(S)	N. Natarajan	738	0.48	
Independent	N. Suresh	544	0.35	
Independent	K. Palanisamy	366	0.24	
Independent	K. Subramani	264	0.17	
Margin of victory		23,438	15.25	−6.49
Turnout		153,697	64.17	−5.74
Registered electors		239,674		
INC gain from DMK		Swing	-0.51	

=== 1996 ===
1996 Tamil Nadu Legislative Assembly election: Karur
Party	Candidate	Votes	%	±%
DMK	Vasuki Murugesan	79,302	53.87	21.10
AIADMK	M. Chinnasamy	47,294	32.13	−32.57
MDMK	R. Palanisamy	14,869	10.10	
Independent	S. John Pandian	1,346	0.91	
BJP	M. Dhavanathan	944	0.64	
Independent	A. Chandra Mohan @ Babu	604	0.41	
Independent	A. Ramalingam	274	0.19	
Independent	R. N. Rajendran	188	0.13	
Independent	M. Raju	180	0.12	
Independent	A. Mohammed Hasib Khan	164	0.11	
Independent	M. Mayyazhagan	147	0.10	
Margin of victory		32,008	21.74	−10.18
Turnout		147,217	69.92	4.46
Registered electors		218,072		
DMK gain from AIADMK		Swing	-10.83	

=== 1991 ===
1991 Tamil Nadu Legislative Assembly election: Karur
Party	Candidate	Votes	%	±%
AIADMK	M. Chinnasamy	89,351	64.69	29.54
DMK	Vasuki Murugesan	45,259	32.77	−5.58
PMK	P. N. Gopalakrishnan	1,674	1.21	
THMM	K. Mathialagan	258	0.19	
Independent	C. Narasimhan	245	0.18	
Independent	S. Singaravel	215	0.16	
Independent	K. R. Kandasamy	157	0.11	
Independent	R. Sekar	146	0.11	
Independent	T. Subbrathinam	125	0.09	
Independent	V. M. Rajagopal	116	0.08	
Independent	K. Kandasamy	115	0.08	
Margin of victory		44,092	31.92	28.74
Turnout		138,114	65.46	−10.92
Registered electors		216,246		
AIADMK gain from DMK		Swing	26.35	

=== 1989 ===
1989 Tamil Nadu Legislative Assembly election: Karur
Party	Candidate	Votes	%	±%
DMK	K. V. Ramasamy	54,163	38.34	−5.86
AIADMK	M. Chinnasamy	49,661	35.16	−19.19
INC	S. Murugaiyan	24,309	17.21	
AIADMK	K. Vadivel	9,489	6.72	−47.63
BJP	S. Gopalan	1,048	0.74	
Independent	S. Ravi	782	0.55	
Independent	V. Sivasamy	520	0.37	
Independent	R. Raju	308	0.22	
Independent	P. Murugaiyan	221	0.16	
Independent	G. Mani	112	0.08	
Independent	M. Appovoo	77	0.05	
Margin of victory		4,502	3.19	−6.96
Turnout		141,253	76.38	−3.19
Registered electors		187,737		
DMK gain from AIADMK		Swing	-16.01	

=== 1984 ===
1984 Tamil Nadu Legislative Assembly election: Karur
Party	Candidate	Votes	%	±%
AIADMK	K. Vadivel	65,363	54.35	3.57
DMK	K. V. Ramasamy	53,160	44.20	1.18
Independent	K. R. Krishnan	597	0.50	
Independent	P. Nallasamy	292	0.24	
Independent	P. Duraisamy	283	0.24	
Independent	R. Natesan	226	0.19	
Independent	S. Karthikeyan	182	0.15	
Independent	M. Santhanam	155	0.13	
Margin of victory		12,203	10.15	2.38
Turnout		120,258	79.57	8.37
Registered electors		156,620		
AIADMK hold		Swing	3.57	

=== 1980 ===
1980 Tamil Nadu Legislative Assembly election: Karur
Party	Candidate	Votes	%	±%
AIADMK	M. Chinnasamy	54,331	50.79	15.68
DMK	S. Nallasamy	46,025	43.02	19.93
JP	P. Sivasamy	5,465	5.11	
Independent	N. Natesan	828	0.77	
Independent	M. Appavoo	332	0.31	
Margin of victory		8,306	7.76	−4.26
Turnout		106,981	71.20	4.38
Registered electors		151,461		
AIADMK hold		Swing	15.68	

=== 1977 ===
1977 Tamil Nadu Legislative Assembly election: Karur
Party	Candidate	Votes	%	±%
AIADMK	K. Vadivel	33,856	35.11	
DMK	S. Nallasamy	22,264	23.09	−33.47
CPI	K. S. Ramasamy	20,252	21.00	
JP	G. Balan	18,499	19.18	
Independent	R. Poonnusamy	938	0.97	
Independent	V. Vembarayan	386	0.40	
Independent	M. S. Santhanam	233	0.24	
Margin of victory		11,592	12.02	−1.09
Turnout		96,428	66.82	−11.44
Registered electors		145,681		
AIADMK gain from DMK		Swing	-21.44	

=== 1971 ===
1971 Tamil Nadu Legislative Assembly election: Karur
Party	Candidate	Votes	%	±%
DMK	S. Nallasamy	45,977	56.55	
INC	T. M. Nallaswamy	35,320	43.45	−1.50
Margin of victory		10,657	13.11	6.58
Turnout		81,297	78.26	−3.72
Registered electors		106,789		
DMK gain from INC		Swing	11.61	

=== 1967 ===
1967 Madras Legislative Assembly election: Karur
Party	Candidate	Votes	%	±%
INC	T. M. Nallaswamy	33,552	44.95	−6.07
CPI(M)	S. Nallaswamy	28,677	38.42	
CPI	K. S. Ramasamy	11,846	15.87	
Independent	V. K. Velsamy	573	0.77	
Margin of victory		4,875	6.53	−15.89
Turnout		74,648	81.97	0.62
Registered electors		94,273		
INC hold		Swing	-6.07	

=== 1962 ===
1962 Madras Legislative Assembly election: Karur
Party	Candidate	Votes	%	±%
INC	T. M. Nallasamy	35,969	51.02	−8.85
CPI	K. S. Ramasamy	20,160	28.59	
DMK	R. N. Ramasamy	14,373	20.39	
Margin of victory		15,809	22.42	−17.41
Turnout		70,502	81.35	18.14
Registered electors		89,018		
INC hold		Swing	-8.85	

=== 1957 ===
1957 Madras Legislative Assembly election: Karur
Party	Candidate	Votes	%	±%
INC	T. M. Nallaswamy	31,611	59.87	40.26
CPI	K. S. Ramasami	10,576	20.03	
Independent	M. Kulandaivel	8,915	16.88	
Independent	M. G. Perumal	1,701	3.22	
Margin of victory		21,035	39.84	38.72
Turnout		52,803	63.22	−26.08
Registered electors		83,526		
INC gain from Independent		Swing	39.14	

=== 1952 ===
1952 Madras Legislative Assembly election: Karur
Party	Candidate	Votes	%	±%
Independent	M. Manickasundaram	29,429	20.72	
INC	S. Muthuswamy Gounder	27,840	19.61	19.61
Independent	Vadivel Moopan	15,015	10.57	
Socialist Party (India)	M. P. Kumaraswami	7,265	5.12	
Independent	Annathurai Iyengar	7,019	4.94	
Independent	M. Ganesan	6,661	4.69	
Independent	V. Ramaswamy	5,585	3.93	
Independent	T. S. Krishnaswami	5,504	3.88	
Independent	G. Swaminathan	5,203	3.66	
Margin of victory		1,589	1.12	
Turnout		142,004	89.30	
Registered electors		159,025		
Independent win (new seat)				
