= R. Kamaraj =

Indian politician

Minister of Food and Civil Supplies
- In office 6 November 2011 – 6 May 2021
- Chief Minister: J. Jayalalithaa; O. Panneerselvam; Edappadi K. Palaniswami

Minister for Hindu Religious and Charitable Endowments
- In office 26 January 2015 – 22 May 2016
- Chief Minister: J.Jayalalithaa; O. Panneerselvam

Member of the Tamil Nadu Legislative Assembly
- Incumbent
- Assumed office 16 May 2011
- Preceded by: P. Padmavathy
- Constituency: Nannilam

Member of Parliament, Rajya Sabha
- In office March 2001 – March 2007
- Constituency: Tamil Nadu

Personal details
- Party: All India Anna Dravida Munnetra Kazhagam
- Parent: P. Rajagopal (father)

Rajagopal Kamaraj (born 25 June 1960) is an Indian politician from the All India Anna Dravida Munnetra Kazhagam (AIADMK) party. He has been a member of the Tamil Nadu Legislative Assembly from Nannilam constituency since 2011 and was the Minister for Food of the Government of Tamil Nadu. Prior to his state assembly role, he represented Tamil Nadu as a member of Parliament of India in the Rajya Sabha, the upper house of the Indian Parliament.

Kamaraj was elected to the Tamil Nadu Legislative Assembly as an AIADMK candidate from the Nannilam constituency in the 2011 state assembly elections.

Kamaraj replaced Budhichandhiran as Minister for Food in the Government of Tamil Nadu in November 2011, being appointed in the third cabinet reshuffle in a five-month period by Chief Minister Jayalalithaa.

In January 2015, Kamaraj became Minister for Hindu Religious and Charitable Endowments as well as Minister of Food. This additional responsibility was transferred from the critically ill P. Chendur Pandian.

In April 2017, Kamaraj was one of three AIADMK ministers against whom police filed a First Information Report after allegations of obstructing officials who were conducting raids related to income tax. He and Udumalai K. Radhakrishnan were alleged to have done so at the house of the Minister for Health, C. Vijayabhaskar. The following month, the Supreme Court of India criticised the Government of Tamil Nadu for not investigating a case relating to land fraud in which Kamaraj was alleged to be involved.

== Personal life ==
Kamaraj was born in Mannargudi on 25 June 1960. He has an MA degree. He is married and has two children.
