= S. P. Velumani =

Indian politician (born 1969)

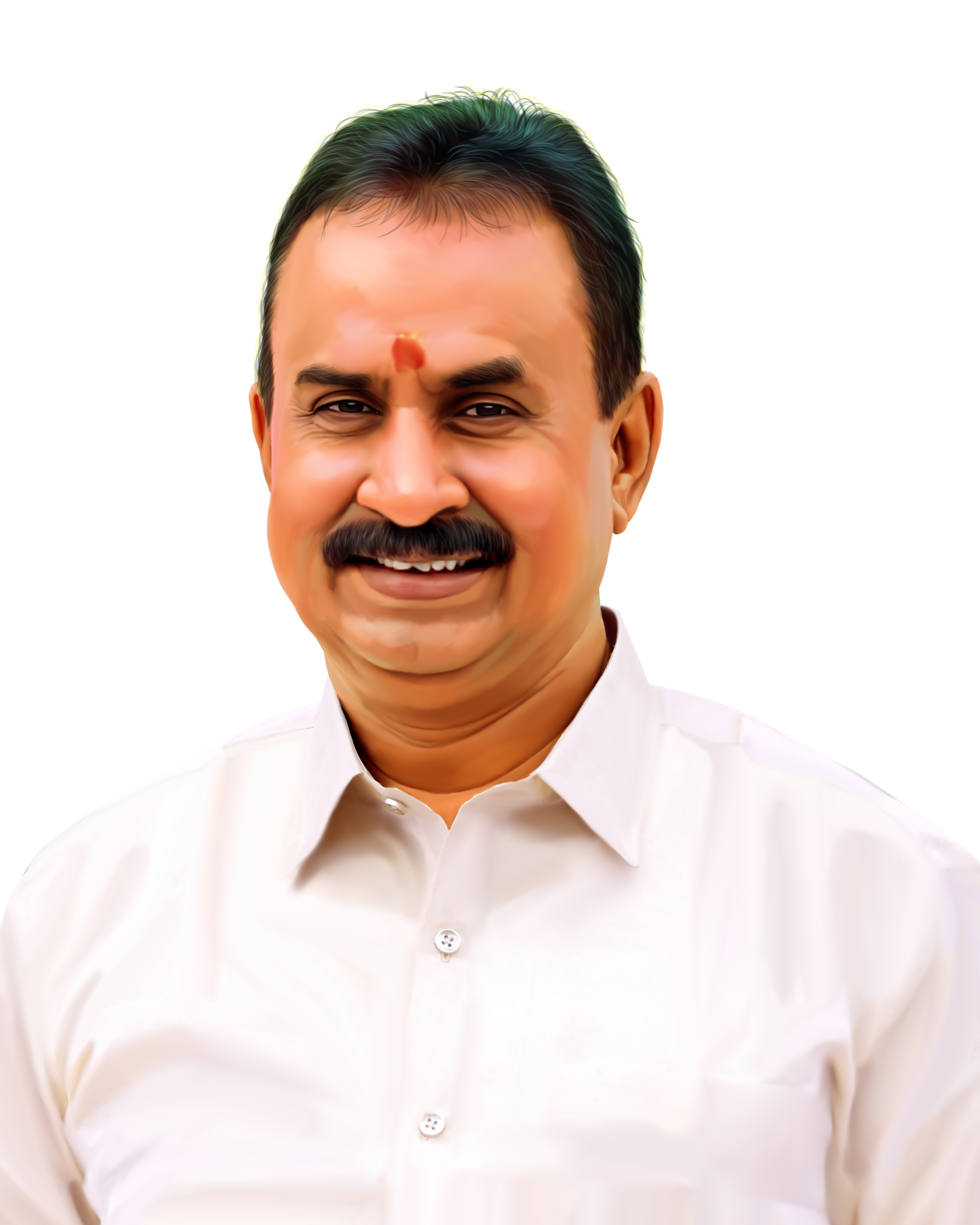

Member of the Tamil Nadu Legislative Assembly
- Incumbent
- Assumed office 16 May 2011
- Chief Minister: J. Jayalalithaa; O. Panneerselvam; Edappadi K. Palaniswami; M. K. Stalin; C. Joseph Vijay
- Preceded by: M. N. Kandaswamy
- Constituency: Thondamuthur
- In office 11 May 2006 – 13 May 2011
- Chief Minister: M. Karunanidhi
- Preceded by: M. A. P. A. Krishnakumar
- Succeeded by: Constituency abolished
- Constituency: Perur

Headquarters Secretary of the All India Anna Dravida Munnetra Kazhagam
- In office 13 July 2022 – 13 May 2026
- General Secretary: Edappadi K. Palaniswami
- Preceded by: Edappadi K. Palaniswami

Personal details
- Born: Sugunapuram Palanisamy Velumani; 10 May 1969 (age 57) Sugunapuram, Kuniyamuthur, Coimbatore, Tamil Nadu, India
- Party: All India Anna Dravida Munnetra Kazhagam
- Children: 2 (including Vikas Velumani)
- Parents: E. A. Palanisamy (father); Mayilathal (mother)
- Education: M.A., M.Phil, Annamalai University
- Occupation: Agriculturist; Industrialist; Politician
- Website: SP Velumani

S. P. Velumani
- In office 2011–2021
- Minister: Municipal Administration, Rural Development and Implementation of Special Programme
- Leader: J. Jayalalitha; O. Pannerselvam; Edappadi K. Palaniswami
- Preceded by: M K Stalin
- Succeeded by: K. N. Nehru (Municipal Administration); I. Periyasamy (Rural Development)

Sugunapuram Palanisamy Velumani, born 10 May 1969, is an Indian politician and current Member of the Tamil Nadu Legislative Assembly from Thondamuthur Assembly constituency. He belongs to the Gounder community.

== Political career ==
S. P. Velumani is a prominent politician of All India Anna Dravida Munnetra Kazhagam. He has won the Tamil Nadu Legislative Assembly elections in 2006, 2011, 2016 and 2021 as an All India Anna Dravida Munnetra Kazhagam candidate. He was previously the Minister for Municipal Administration, Rural Development, Law and Implementation of Special Programme.

In March 2022 the Directorate of Vigilance and Anti-Corruption launched an investigation into a case of disproportionate assets against Velumani. In the same month DVAC carried out searches at 59 locations belonging to Velumani and his family members, discovering 11 kilograms of gold and documents related to various cryptocurrencies.

He was the Headquarters Secretary of All India Anna Dravida Munnetra Kazhagam from 13 July 2022 to 13 May 2026.

In September 2022, DVAC booked a criminal case against Velumani and his associates in connection with an Rs 500 crore irregularity found during the purchase of LED street lights. The case accused Velumani of misusing his authority by favoring his close associates in awarding tenders, resulting in financial losses for the government between 2015 and 2018. The case was later quashed by the Madras High Court following a petition filed for relief being accepted.

== Member of the Legislative Assembly ==
Assembly	Duration	Winner	Constituency
Thirteenth	2006–2011	S. P. Velumani	Perur
Fourteenth	2011–2016	S. P. Velumani	Thondamuthur
Fifteenth	2016–2021	S. P. Velumani	Thondamuthur
Sixteenth	2021–2026	S. P. Velumani	Thondamuthur
Seventeenth	2026–present	S. P. Velumani	Thondamuthur
