= Rasipuram Assembly constituency =

State Legislative Assembly Constituency in Tamil Nadu

Coordinates: 11.47°N 78.17°E

Rasipuram
- Constituency No. 92 for the Tamil Nadu Legislative Assembly

Constituency details
- Country: India
- Region: South India
- State: Tamil Nadu
- District: Namakkal
- Lok Sabha constituency: Namakkal
- Established: 1951
- Total electors: 2,22,304
- Reservation: SC

Member of Legislative Assembly
- 17th Tamil Nadu Legislative Assembly
- Incumbent D. Logesh Tamilselvan; Minister for Commercial Taxes, Registration and Stamp Duty
- Party: TVK
- Elected year: 2026

Rasipuram is a state assembly constituency in Namakkal district of Tamil Nadu, India. Its State Assembly Constituency number is 92. It comprises a portion of Rasipuram taluk and is a part of the wider Namakkal Lok Sabha constituency for national elections to the Parliament of India. The seat is reserved for candidates from the Scheduled Castes. It is one of the 234 State Legislative Assembly Constituencies in Tamil Nadu, in India. Elections and winners in the constituency are listed below.

== Members of Legislative Assembly ==
=== Madras State ===
| Year | Winner | Party |
|---|---|---|
| 1952 | T. M. Kaliannan | Indian National Congress |
| 1957 | A. Raja Gounder | Indian National Congress |
| 1962 | N. P. Sengottuvel | Dravida Munnetra Kazhagam |
| 1967 | P. Periasamy | Dravida Munnetra Kazhagam |

=== Tamil Nadu ===
| Year | Winner | Party |
|---|---|---|
| 1971 | R. Nainamalai | Dravida Munnetra Kazhagam |
| 1977 | P. Duraisamy | All India Anna Dravida Munnetra Kazhagam |
| 1980 | K. P. Ramalingam | All India Anna Dravida Munnetra Kazhagam |
| 1984 | K. P. Ramalingam | All India Anna Dravida Munnetra Kazhagam |
| 1989 | A. Subbu | Dravida Munnetra Kazhagam |
| 1991 | K. Palaniammal | All India Anna Dravida Munnetra Kazhagam |
| 1996 | P. R. Sundaram | All India Anna Dravida Munnetra Kazhagam |
| 2001 | P. R. Sundaram | All India Anna Dravida Munnetra Kazhagam |
| 2006 | K. P. Ramaswamy | Dravida Munnetra Kazhagam |
| 2011 | P. Dhanapal | All India Anna Dravida Munnetra Kazhagam |
| 2016 | V. Saroja | All India Anna Dravida Munnetra Kazhagam |
| 2021 | M. Mathiventhan | Dravida Munnetra Kazhagam |
| 2026 | Logesh Tamilselvan D | Tamilaga Vettri Kazhagam |

== Election results ==
Vote share of winning candidates
| 2026 | 36.55% |
| 2021 | 46.58% |
| 2016 | 46.50% |
| 2011 | 55.60% |
| 2006 | 45.47% |
| 2001 | 57.48% |
| 1996 | 37.93% |
| 1991 | 72.15% |
| 1989 | 35.75% |
| 1984 | 52.45% |
| 1980 | 58.25% |
| 1977 | 43.61% |
| 1971 | 54.90% |
| 1967 | 52.53% |
| 1962 | 49.21% |
| 1957 | 54.46% |
| 1952 | 42.02% |

=== 2026 ===
2026 Tamil Nadu Legislative Assembly election: Rasipuram
| Party | Candidate | Votes | % | ±% |
|---|---|---|---|---|
| TVK | Logesh Tamilselvan D | 74,808 | 36.55 | New |
| BJP | Premkumar S. D. | 60,297 | 29.46 | New |
| DMK | M. Mathiventhan | 57,854 | 28.27 | ▼18.31 |
| NTK | Sasikala S | 6,415 | 3.13 | ▼2.67 |
| NOTA | NOTA | 863 | 0.42 | ▼0.66 |
| Margin of victory | | 14,511 | 7.09 | ▲6.09 |
| Turnout | | 2,04,680 | 92.07 | ▲9.71 |
| Registered electors | | 2,22,304 | | |
| TVK gain from DMK | | Swing | ▲36.55 | |

=== 2021 ===
2021 Tamil Nadu Legislative Assembly election: Rasipuram
| Party | Candidate | Votes | % | ±% |
|---|---|---|---|---|
| DMK | M. Mathiventhan | 90,727 | 46.58 | +5.23 |
| AIADMK | Dr. V. Saroja | 88,775 | 45.57 | −0.93 |
| NTK | K. Silambarasi | 11,295 | 5.80 | +4.69 |
| NOTA | NOTA | 2,110 | 1.08 | −0.41 |
| IJK | R. Ramkumar | 1,133 | 0.58 | New |
| AMMK | S. Anbalagan | 1,051 | 0.54 | New |
| Margin of victory | | 1,952 | 1.00 | −4.15 |
| Turnout | | 194,794 | 82.36 | −1.89 |
| Rejected ballots | | 162 | 0.08 | |
| Registered electors | | 236,524 | | |
| DMK gain from AIADMK | | Swing | 0.07 | |

=== 2016 ===
2016 Tamil Nadu Legislative Assembly election: Rasipuram
| Party | Candidate | Votes | % | ±% |
|---|---|---|---|---|
| AIADMK | Dr. V. Saroja | 86,901 | 46.50 | −9.09 |
| DMK | V. P. Duraisamy | 77,270 | 41.35 | +0.99 |
| PMK | J. Pushpagandhi | 6,952 | 3.72 | New |
| VCK | G. Arjun | 4,341 | 2.32 | New |
| NOTA | NOTA | 2,795 | 1.50 | New |
| KMDK | P. Bharathi | 2,542 | 1.36 | New |
| BJP | C. Kuppusamy | 2,375 | 1.27 | +0.2 |
| NTK | S. Arunkumar | 2,076 | 1.11 | New |
| Margin of victory | | 9,631 | 5.15 | −10.08 |
| Turnout | | 186,869 | 84.25 | 0.89 |
| Registered electors | | 221,806 | | |
| AIADMK hold | | Swing | -9.09 | |

=== 2011 ===
2011 Tamil Nadu Legislative Assembly election: Rasipuram
| Party | Candidate | Votes | % | ±% |
|---|---|---|---|---|
| AIADMK | P. Dhanapal | 90,186 | 55.60 | +13.74 |
| DMK | V. P. Duraisamy | 65,469 | 40.36 | −5.11 |
| BJP | L. Murugan | 1,730 | 1.07 | +0.03 |
| IJK | S. Periasamy | 1,704 | 1.05 | New |
| Independent | V. Rangarasu | 1,700 | 1.05 | New |
| Margin of victory | | 24,717 | 15.24 | 11.63 |
| Turnout | | 162,217 | 83.36 | 9.71 |
| Registered electors | | 194,596 | | |
| AIADMK gain from DMK | | Swing | 10.13 | |

=== 2006 ===
2006 Tamil Nadu Legislative Assembly election: Rasipuram
| Party | Candidate | Votes | % | ±% |
|---|---|---|---|---|
| DMK | K. P. Ramaswamy | 62,629 | 45.47 | +7.65 |
| AIADMK | P. R. Sundaram | 57,660 | 41.86 | −15.62 |
| DMDK | R. Rajagounder | 11,992 | 8.71 | New |
| Independent | K. Ramasamy | 1,490 | 1.08 | New |
| BJP | Velu. Rajamani | 1,427 | 1.04 | New |
| Independent | P. Venkatachalam | 889 | 0.65 | New |
| Margin of victory | | 4,969 | 3.61 | −16.05 |
| Turnout | | 137,750 | 73.65 | 10.82 |
| Registered electors | | 187,025 | | |
| DMK gain from AIADMK | | Swing | -12.01 | |

=== 2001 ===
2001 Tamil Nadu Legislative Assembly election: Rasipuram
| Party | Candidate | Votes | % | ±% |
|---|---|---|---|---|
| AIADMK | P. R. Sundaram | 67,332 | 57.48 | +19.55 |
| DMK | Dr. K. P. Ramalingam | 44,303 | 37.82 | +0.29 |
| Independent | K. Ramasamy | 1,755 | 1.50 | New |
| MDMK | N. P. Kulandaivel | 1,602 | 1.37 | −0.03 |
| Independent | S. Jayabalan | 1,222 | 1.04 | New |
| Margin of victory | | 23,029 | 19.66 | 19.25 |
| Turnout | | 117,144 | 62.84 | −4.55 |
| Registered electors | | 188,637 | | |
| AIADMK hold | | Swing | 19.55 | |

=== 1996 ===
1996 Tamil Nadu Legislative Assembly election: Rasipuram
| Party | Candidate | Votes | % | ±% |
|---|---|---|---|---|
| AIADMK | P. R. Sundaram | 42,294 | 37.93 | −34.22 |
| DMK | R. R. Damayandhi | 41,840 | 37.52 | +13.15 |
| Independent | A. K. P. Chinraj | 23,161 | 20.77 | New |
| MDMK | B. A. R. Elangovan | 1,555 | 1.39 | New |
| RPI | R. Muthusamy | 694 | 0.62 | New |
| Margin of victory | | 454 | 0.41 | −47.37 |
| Turnout | | 111,500 | 67.39 | 2.87 |
| Registered electors | | 173,617 | | |
| AIADMK hold | | Swing | -34.22 | |

=== 1991 ===
1991 Tamil Nadu Legislative Assembly election: Rasipuram
| Party | Candidate | Votes | % | ±% |
|---|---|---|---|---|
| AIADMK | K. Palaniammal | 75,855 | 72.15 | +36.82 |
| DMK | B. A. R. Elangoavan | 25,625 | 24.37 | −11.37 |
| PMK | K. Natesan | 2,376 | 2.26 | New |
| Margin of victory | | 50,230 | 47.78 | 47.36 |
| Turnout | | 105,129 | 64.52 | −7.92 |
| Registered electors | | 167,994 | | |
| AIADMK gain from DMK | | Swing | 36.41 | |

=== 1989 ===
1989 Tamil Nadu Legislative Assembly election: Rasipuram
| Party | Candidate | Votes | % | ±% |
|---|---|---|---|---|
| DMK | A. Subbu | 39,534 | 35.75 | −6.05 |
| AIADMK | V. Thamilarasu | 39,074 | 35.33 | −17.12 |
| AIADMK | K. P. Ramalingam | 16,855 | 15.24 | −37.21 |
| INC | V. Sundaram | 11,157 | 10.09 | New |
| India Farmers and Tailers Party | K. Sundaram | 1,823 | 1.65 | New |
| Margin of victory | | 460 | 0.42 | −10.24 |
| Turnout | | 110,592 | 72.43 | −3.29 |
| Registered electors | | 155,741 | | |
| DMK gain from AIADMK | | Swing | -16.70 | |

=== 1984 ===
1984 Tamil Nadu Legislative Assembly election: Rasipuram
| Party | Candidate | Votes | % | ±% |
|---|---|---|---|---|
| AIADMK | K. P. Ramalingam | 51,565 | 52.45 | −5.8 |
| DMK | P. Kaliappan | 41,087 | 41.79 | +1.8 |
| Independent | M. P. Duraisami | 3,498 | 3.56 | New |
| Independent | A. Shanmugam | 940 | 0.96 | New |
| Independent | P. Kandasamy | 539 | 0.55 | New |
| Margin of victory | | 10,478 | 10.66 | −7.60 |
| Turnout | | 98,311 | 75.73 | 7.26 |
| Registered electors | | 137,200 | | |
| AIADMK hold | | Swing | -5.80 | |

=== 1980 ===
1980 Tamil Nadu Legislative Assembly election: Rasipuram
| Party | Candidate | Votes | % | ±% |
|---|---|---|---|---|
| AIADMK | K. P. Ramalingam | 49,779 | 58.25 | +14.64 |
| DMK | P. T. Muthu | 34,175 | 39.99 | +14.97 |
| Margin of victory | | 15,604 | 18.26 | −0.32 |
| Turnout | | 85,463 | 68.47 | 6.36 |
| Registered electors | | 126,614 | | |
| AIADMK hold | | Swing | 14.64 | |

=== 1977 ===
1977 Tamil Nadu Legislative Assembly election: Rasipuram
| Party | Candidate | Votes | % | ±% |
|---|---|---|---|---|
| AIADMK | P. Duraisamy | 33,762 | 43.61 | New |
| DMK | K. C. Periasamy | 19,374 | 25.02 | −29.88 |
| JP | P. Ramasamy | 11,830 | 15.28 | New |
| INC | R. Kaliappan | 10,498 | 13.56 | −28.09 |
| Independent | M. Arumugam | 1,186 | 1.53 | New |
| Independent | K. R. Athiappa Gounder | 471 | 0.61 | New |
| Margin of victory | | 14,388 | 18.58 | 5.33 |
| Turnout | | 77,425 | 62.11 | −11.43 |
| Registered electors | | 126,007 | | |
| AIADMK gain from DMK | | Swing | -11.29 | |

=== 1971 ===
1971 Tamil Nadu Legislative Assembly election: Rasipuram
| Party | Candidate | Votes | % | ±% |
|---|---|---|---|---|
| DMK | R. Nainamalai | 41,079 | 54.90 | +2.37 |
| INC | P. Ganapathy | 31,161 | 41.64 | −0.59 |
| Independent | K. A. C. Arthanaree Chetty | 2,587 | 3.46 | New |
| Margin of victory | | 9,918 | 13.25 | 2.96 |
| Turnout | | 74,827 | 73.54 | −4.54 |
| Registered electors | | 105,188 | | |
| DMK hold | | Swing | 2.37 | |

=== 1967 ===
1967 Madras Legislative Assembly election: Rasipuram
| Party | Candidate | Votes | % | ±% |
|---|---|---|---|---|
| DMK | P. Periasamy | 38,402 | 52.53 | +3.32 |
| INC | K. M. Gounder | 30,873 | 42.23 | −6.85 |
| Independent | K. V. K. Ramaswamy | 2,142 | 2.93 | New |
| Independent | S. Balu | 1,001 | 1.37 | New |
| ABJS | O. Govindraju | 440 | 0.60 | New |
| Margin of victory | | 7,529 | 10.30 | 10.17 |
| Turnout | | 73,108 | 78.08 | 6.99 |
| Registered electors | | 96,950 | | |
| DMK hold | | Swing | 3.32 | |

=== 1962 ===
1962 Madras Legislative Assembly election: Rasipuram
| Party | Candidate | Votes | % | ±% |
|---|---|---|---|---|
| DMK | N. P. Sengottuvel | 26,846 | 49.21 | New |
| INC | Muthuswamy Gounder | 26,776 | 49.08 | −5.38 |
| We Tamils | Alagappa Udayar | 932 | 1.71 | New |
| Margin of victory | | 70 | 0.13 | −8.80 |
| Turnout | | 54,554 | 71.09 | 21.71 |
| Registered electors | | 78,659 | | |
| DMK gain from INC | | Swing | -5.25 | |

=== 1957 ===
1957 Madras Legislative Assembly election: Rasipuram
| Party | Candidate | Votes | % | ±% |
|---|---|---|---|---|
| INC | A. Raja Gounder | 20,983 | 54.46 | +12.44 |
| Independent | K. V. K. Ramaswami | 17,545 | 45.54 | New |
| Margin of victory | | 3,438 | 8.92 | −10.02 |
| Turnout | | 38,528 | 49.38 | −11.58 |
| Registered electors | | 78,017 | | |
| INC hold | | Swing | 12.44 | |

=== 1952 ===
1952 Madras Legislative Assembly election: Rasipuram
| Party | Candidate | Votes | % | ±% |
|---|---|---|---|---|
| INC | T. M. Kaliannan | 18,553 | 42.02 | New |
| Independent | K. Ramaswamy | 10,189 | 23.08 | New |
| Socialist Party (India) | N. Kandaswami Mudali | 8,402 | 19.03 | New |
| Independent | R. Muthu Gounder | 5,941 | 13.46 | New |
| Independent | P. Namasivayam | 1,068 | 2.42 | New |
| Margin of victory | | 8,364 | 18.94 | |
| Turnout | | 44,153 | 60.97 | |
| Registered electors | | 72,423 | | |
| INC win (new seat) | | | | |
