= Logesh Tamilselvan =

Indian politician (born 1984)

Minister of Commercial Taxes, Registration and Stamp Law
- Incumbent
- Assumed office 21 May 2026
- Governor: Rajendra Arlekar
- Chief Minister: C. Joseph Vijay
- Preceded by: P. Moorthy
- Constituency: Rasipuram Assembly constituency

Member of Tamil Nadu Legislative Assembly
- Incumbent
- Assumed office 10 May 2026
- Preceded by: M. Mathiventhan
- Chief Minister: C. Joseph Vijay
- Speaker: J. C. D. Prabhakar
- constituency: Rasipuram

Personal details
- Born: 1984 (age 41–42) Tamil Nadu, India
- Party: Tamilaga Vettri Kazhagam
- Other political affiliations: All India Anna Dravida Munnetra Kazhagam (until 2026)
- Parent: P. Dhanapal (father)

Dhanapal Logesh Tamilselvan (born 1984) is an Indian politician from Tamil Nadu.In 2026, he is the incumbent Minister of Commercial Taxes, Registration and Stamp Duty in the Government of Tamil Nadu under the Vijay ministry. He is an incumbent member of the Tamil Nadu Legislative Assembly from the Rasipuram Assembly constituency, which is reserved for Scheduled Caste community in Namakkal district, representing the Tamilaga Vettri Kazhagam.

He is one of the three ministers from Namakkal district.The other two are, prominent party member and general secretary of TVK, KG Arunraj, from Tiruchengode Assembly constituency, who is the incumbent Minister of health, and C. Vijayalakshmi from Kumarapalayam Assembly constituency who is also an incumbent minister.

== Early life and education ==
Tamilselvan is from Salem, Tamil Nadu. He is the son of Dhanapal, a former MLA from Rasipuram, minister and speaker of the Tamil Nadu Legislative Assembly under the Jayalalithaa ministry. He did his B.Com. at Madras Loyola College, Chennai in 2005. Later, he completed his M.B.A. in Marketing Management and Personal Management in 2007 at the Indian Institute of Planning and Management, Delhi. He runs his own business and his wife is an architect. He declared assets worth Rs.7 crore in his affidavit to the Election Commission of India.

== Career ==
In 2024, he contested and lost from the Nilgiris Lok Sabha constituency representing the All India Anna Dravida Munnetra Kazhagam (AIADMK) in the 2024 Indian general election in Tamil Nadu. He polled 2,20,230 votes but could finish only third behind winner A. Raja of the Dravida Munnetra Kazhagam and Murugan. L. of the Bharatiya Janata Party, who came second.

On 21 February 2026, He quit AIADMK and Joined Tamilaga Vettri Kazhagam in the presence of its President Vijay. Tamilselvan contested and won the Rasipuram Assembly constituency representing Tamilaga Vettri Kazhagam in the 2026 Tamil Nadu Legislative Assembly election. He polled 74,808 votes and defeated his nearest rival, S. D. Premkumar of the Bharatiya Janata Party, by a margin of 14,511 votes. He also defeated former minister M. Mathiventhan of DMK, who could finish only third.
