= P. Thangamani =

Indian politician (born 1961)

Minister of Electricity & Prohibition and Excise
- In office 16 May 2016 – 6 May 2021

Minister of Industries, Steel, Mines & Minerals and Special Initiatives
- In office 16 May 2011 — 16 May 2016

Member of the Tamil Nadu Legislative Assembly
- In office 16 May 2011 – 5 May 2026
- Preceded by: Constituency Established
- Succeeded by: C. Vijayalakshmi
- Constituency: Kumarapalayam
- In office 11 May 2006 – 13 May 2011
- Preceded by: C. Ponnaiyan
- Succeeded by: P. Sampath Kumar
- Constituency: Tiruchengode

Personal details
- Born: 25 August 1961 (age 65) Govindhampalayam
- Children: 2
- Parent: Perumal (father)

Perumal Thangamani is an Indian politician and incumbent Member of the Legislative Assembly of Tamil Nadu from Kumarapalayam constituency. He was the minister of industry during 2011–16 elected from Kumarapalayam constituency. Currently, he is elected from same constituency from 2016 and he was the Minister of power of the Government of Tamil Nadu till May 2021. As a cadre of Anna Dravida Munnetra Kazhagam, he was elected to the same Tiruchengode constituency in the 2006 elections.

Tamil Nadu joined the Ujwal Discom Assurance Yojana (UDAY) scheme in January 2017. The agreement was signed by Electricity Minister P. Thangamani in the presence of Union Minister of State for Power Piyush Goyal. According to Business Standard article, the scheme emphasised the need for periodic tariff revisions, with estimated increases varying across states. In the case of Tamil Nadu, higher tariff adjustments were considered more than 10% to address the financial position of the power distribution sector.

Prior to this, Chief Minister J. Jayalalithaa had expressed reservations about the scheme, stating that it would primarily benefit private power producers and financial institutions rather than consumers or the State government. Subsequent reports per The Hindu, indicated that the State’s participation in the scheme occurred during her hospitalisation, alongside developments related to the implementation of the National Food Security Act.

== Electoral performance ==
=== Tamil Nadu Legislative elections ===
Elections	Constituency	Party	Result	Vote percentage	Opposition Candidate	Opposition Party	Opposition vote percentage
2006 Tamil Nadu Legislative Assembly election	Tiruchengode	AIADMK	Won	40.30	S. Gandhiselvan	DMK	40.25
2011 Tamil Nadu Legislative Assembly election	Kumarapalayam	AIADMK	Won	56.59	G. Selvaraju	DMK	39.88
2016 Tamil Nadu Legislative Assembly election	Kumarapalayam	AIADMK	Won	55.20	P. Yuvaraj	DMK	29.84
2021 Tamil Nadu Legislative Assembly election	Kumarapalayam	AIADMK	Won	49.92	M. Venkatachalam	DMK	34.25
