= P. Dhanapal =

Indian politician

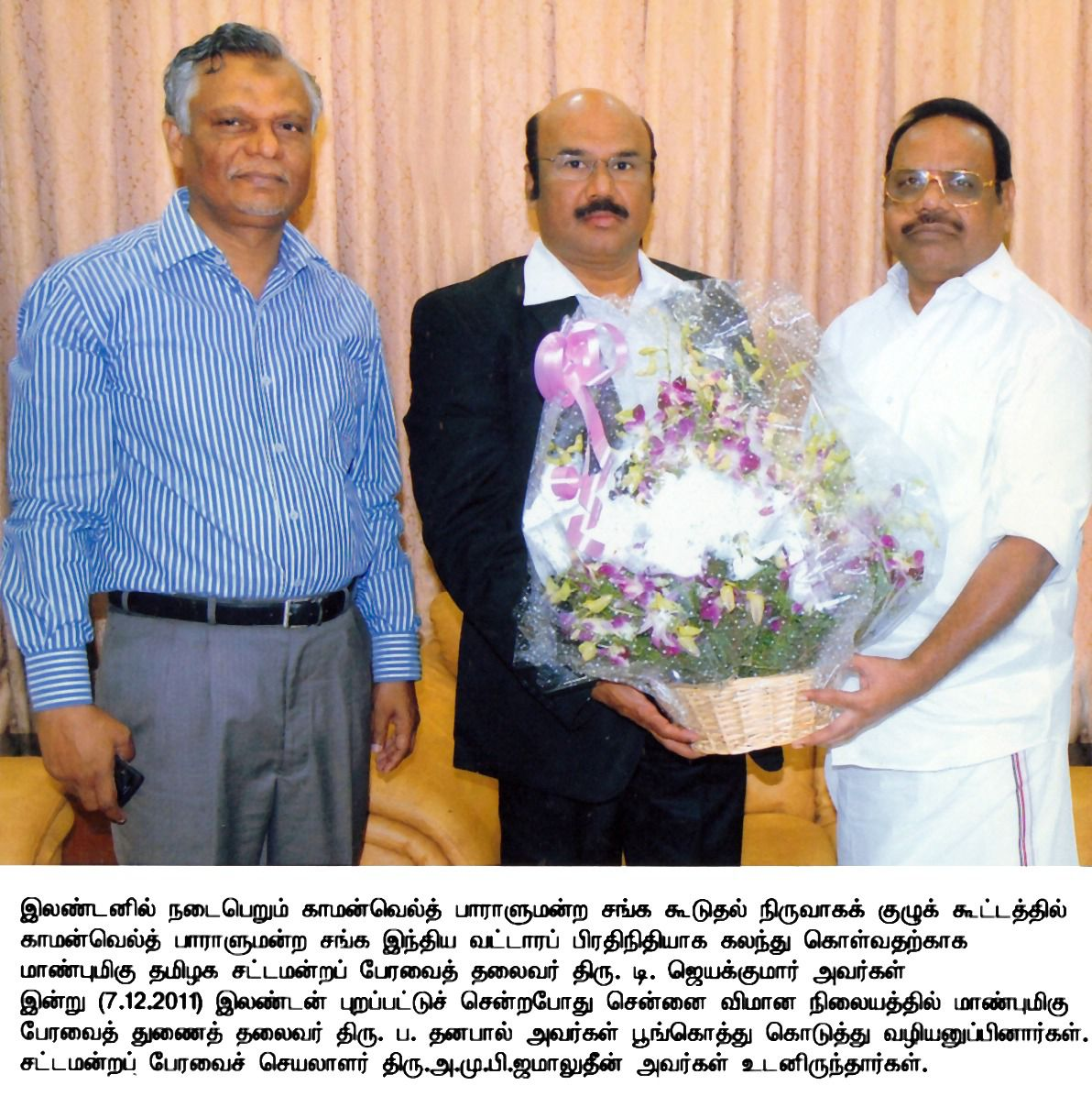
- Dhanapal in 2011

13th Speaker of the Tamil Nadu Legislative Assembly
- In office 10 October 2012 – 6 May 2021
- Deputy: Pollachi V. Jayaraman
- Preceded by: D. Jayakumar
- Succeeded by: M. Appavu
- Constituency: Avanashi (2016-2021); Rasipuram (2011–2016)

Deputy Speaker of Tamil Nadu Legislative Assembly
- In office 27 May 2011 – 9 October 2012
- Preceded by: V. P. Duraisamy
- Succeeded by: Pollachi V. Jayaraman
- Constituency: Rasipuram

Minister for Food and Co-operation
- In office 22 May 2001 – 9 November 2002
- Chief Minister: J.Jayalalithaa; O. Panneerselvam; J.Jayalalithaa
- Preceded by: Natham R. Viswanathan
- Succeeded by: P. Mohan

Minister for Adi Dravidar and Tribal Welfare
- In office 14 May 2001 – 22 May 2001
- Chief Minister: J.Jayalalithaa
- Preceded by: S. Selvaraj
- Succeeded by: V. Subramanian

Member of the Tamil Nadu Legislative Assembly
- In office 16 May 2016 – 6 May 2026
- Preceded by: A. A. Karuppasamy
- Succeeded by: Kamali. S.
- Constituency: Avanashi
- In office 13 May 2011 — 19 May 2016
- Preceded by: K. P. Ramaswamy
- Succeeded by: V. Saroja
- Constituency: Rasipuram
- In office 13 May 2001 — 11 May 2006
- Preceded by: V. Muthu
- Succeeded by: V. P. Duraisamy
- In office 1977–1989
- Preceded by: V. Muthur
- Succeeded by: R. Varadarajan
- Constituency: Sankagiri

Personal details
- Born: 16 May 1951 (age 75) Karuppur, Salem district, Tamil Nadu
- Party: Independent
- Other political affiliations: AIADMK (until 2026)
- Children: Logesh Tamilselvan

P. Dhanapal (born 16 May 1951) is an Indian politician and a former Speaker of Tamil Nadu Legislative Assembly, who served from 2012 to 2021.

Dhanapal was elected to the Tamil Nadu Legislative Assembly as an All India Anna Dravida Munnetra Kazhagam candidate from Sankagiri constituency in the 1977, 1980 and 1984 and 2001 elections. In the 2011, 2016 and 2021 Tamil Nadu assembly elections he won from Rasipuram and Avanashi constituencies, respectively.

== Personal life ==
P. Dhanapal was born on 16 May 1951 in Karupur. He belongs to the Arunthathiyar community, which is recognized as a Scheduled Caste in India. He obtained a master's degree and is married with two children.

In 2026, His son Logesh Tamilselvan was elected as Rasipuram MLA representing Tamilaga Vettri Kazhagam and got inducted to Chief Minister Vijay's cabinet as a Minister of Commercial Taxes, Registration and Stamp Law.

== Political career ==
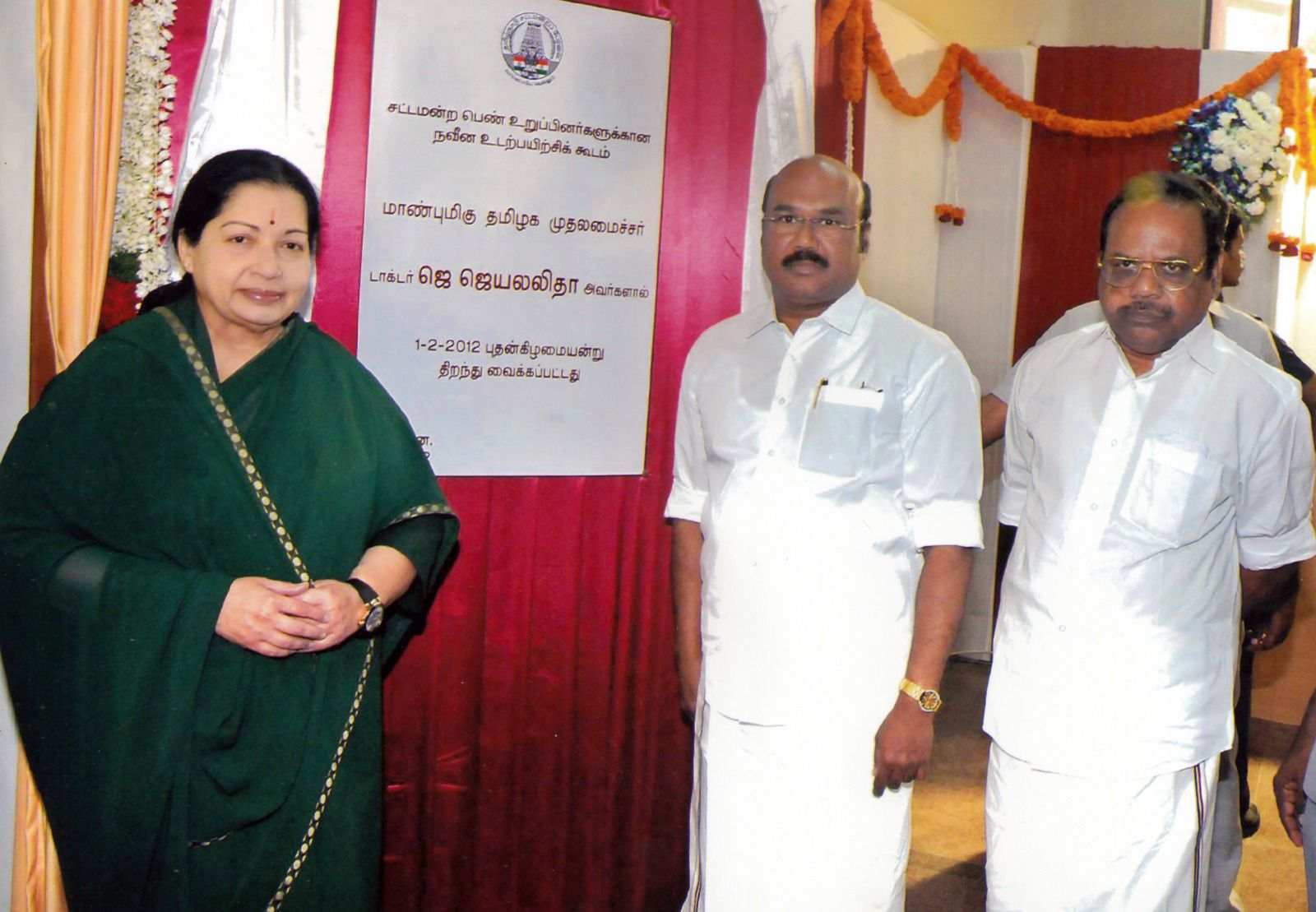
Dhanapal (right) as deputy speaker with Chief Minister Jayalalithaa and Speaker D. Jayakumar in 2012

Dhanapal was one of the 33 AIADMK MLAs who sided with the Jayalalithaa faction following the death of M. G. Ramachandran in 1987, along with K. A. Sengottaiyan and S. Thirunavukkarasar. He was elected member to the Tamil Nadu Legislative Assembly for 7 terms.

He was elected Speaker of Tamil Nadu Assembly for two consecutive terms in 2012-16 and 2016–21. On 21 May 2026, after attending the swearing-in ceremony of his son, Logesh, as a minister in Vijay's cabinet, Dhanapal announced that he had already quit AIADMK, stating that he had not been given “importance” by the party leadership.

== In popular culture ==
- Maamannan (2023) by Mari Selvaraj is partly based on his real life story. Actor Vadivelu played Maamannan (Dhanapal).

== Electoral career ==
=== Tamilnadu Legislative Assembly elections contested ===
| Elections | Constituency | Party | Result | Vote percentage | Opposition candidate | Opposition party | Opposition vote percentage |
|---|---|---|---|---|---|---|---|
| 1977 Tamil Nadu Legislative Assembly election | Sangagiri | AIADMK | Won | 53.27 | M. Paramanandam | DMK | 19.10 |
| 1980 Tamil Nadu Legislative Assembly election | Sangagiri | AIADMK | Won | 56.61 | R. Varadarajan | DMK | 41.04 |
| 1984 Tamil Nadu Legislative Assembly election | Sangagiri | AIADMK | Won | 56.99 | S. Murugesan | DMK | 40.98 |
| 1989 Tamil Nadu Legislative Assembly election | Sangagiri | AIADMK(J) | Lost | 34.15 | R. Varadarajan | DMK | 41.72 |
| 2001 Tamil Nadu Legislative Assembly election | Sangagiri | AIADMK | Won | 56.41 | T. R. Saravanan | DMK | 38.00 |
| 2011 Tamil Nadu Legislative Assembly election | Rasipuram | AIADMK | Won | 55.60 | V. P. Duraisamy | DMK | 40.36 |
| 2016 Tamil Nadu Legislative Assembly election | Avanashi | AIADMK | Won | 48.11 | Anandhan E | DMK | 32.31 |
| 2021 Tamil Nadu Legislative Assembly election | Avanashi | AIADMK | Won | 55.78 | Athiyamaan Raju | DMK | 31.57 |
