= T. M. Kaliannan Gounder =

Indian politician (1921–2021)

T. M. Kalliannan Gounder

Member of the Madras Legislative Council
- In office ? – ?

Member of the Madras Legislative Assembly
- In office 1962 – 1967
- Preceded by: Himself & R. Kandaswami
- Succeeded by: T. A. Rajavelu
- Constituency: Tiruchengode
- In office 1957 – 1962 Serving with R. Kandaswami
- Preceded by: S. Arumugam & T. S. Arthanari
- Succeeded by: Himself
- Constituency: Tiruchengode
- In office 1952 – 1957
- Preceded by: Constituency established
- Succeeded by: A. Raja Gounder
- Constituency: Rasipuram

Member of the Provisional Parliament
- In office 1950 – 1952
- Constituency: Madras

Member of the Constituent Assembly
- In office ? – 1950
- Constituency: Madras

Personal details
- Born: 10 January 1921 Thiruchengode, India
- Died: 28 May 2021 (aged 100) Thiruchengode, India
- Party: Indian National Congress
- Spouse: Parvathiammal
- Children: 3 daughters and 2 sons
- Education: Loyola College, Madras (University of Madras) Pachaiyappa's College

T. M. Kaliyannan Gounder (10 January 1921 – 28 May 2021) was an Indian politician who served as a member of the Provisional Parliament of India and as a member of the Madras Legislative Assembly, Member of the Madras Legislative Council. He was the last surviving member of the first parliament of India (Provisional Parliament 1950–1952) and was one of the few surviving members of the 1st Madras Assembly (MLA 1952 Rasipuram, MLA 1957 Tiruchengode, MLA 1962 Tiruchengode). He played a crucial role in the development of Gandhi Ashram at Tiruchengode and in nurturing Gandhian values among the people of Tamil Nadu.

== Career ==
He was awarded Master of Arts (in English literature) from Loyola College, Madras and Bachelor of Commerce from Pachaiyappa's College, Madras. He adopted by the Kumaramangalam Zamindar family of TN. However, he fought against the Zamindari system. In 1942, TMK got a real taste of Independence activism and public life when he participated in the Quit India movement launched by Mahatma Gandhi. This and many meetings with nationalist leaders like Gandhi, C. Rajagopalachari and S. Satyamurti paved the way for dedicating his life to public service. He was studying English literature at Loyola College in Chennai when he joined the revolution against the British. He was influenced by Mahatma Gandhi and Kamaraj's ideology.

On 28 January 1950, he was sworn in as a member of the Provisional Parliament of India.

He held many posts during his public career, including being the President of the Salem District Board. A keen educator, Kaliyannan Gounder is said to have started more than a thousand schools during his public life. He also opened several temples and charitable organisations in Tiruchengode. Construction projects he helped bring to fruition included the Kolli Malai road network through the Kolli Hills in Namakkal Dt, Tamil Nadu. There are 70 hair pin bends in this engineering marvel. The entire ghat section was built with extremely limited funding and limited faith in the route but all went well and today the mountainous sections of the road are still in excellent condition. The Pallipalayam bridge near Erode was also constructed with his support.

He was the vice president of the Tamil Nadu Congress Committee (TNCC) when Thiru K. Kamaraj was president. A person who avoided the spotlight TMK firmly believes in the principle of "Do Good and throw it into the well". He never hankered after public glory, name or fame. His hard work and approachability made him a favourite among those who sought genuine political advice but his self-effacing approach meant that his work went unnoticed by his own party and the government.

He also held the position of Director, Indian Bank, and Director, Bharat Heavy Electricals Ltd. (Trichy) among other posts. He was elected to the Tamil Nadu legislative assembly as an Indian National Congress candidate from Rasipuram constituency in 1952 election, from Tiruchengode constituency in 1957, and 1962 elections. He was one of the two winners in the 1957 election, the other being R. Kandaswami from the Congress party. For more than 65 years, Kaliannan has been running a free school ‘Avvai Kalvi Nilayam’ at Tiruchengode town.

== Recognition ==
The Tamil Nadu Government recently felicitated T. M. Kaliyannan Gounder and a few other members of the first Assembly of Tamil Nadu. He has also been conferred the honorific title of "KONGU VEL" by the Kongu Association. On his 99th birthday (10 Jan 2020) he was inducted as an Honorary member of Rotary Club of Tiruchengode. He was instrumental in opening 2000 schools and 3000 public libraries.

== Personal life ==
T.M. Kaliyannan was married to Parvathi from Kilambadi, Erode, and they had five children. He died in Thiruchengode on 28 May 2021 at the age of 100.

Chief Minister M. K. Stalin and party leaders condoled his death, celebrating his actions throughout his political career.
