= T. M. Selvaganapathy =

Indian politician

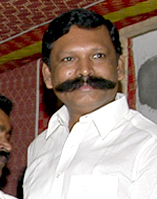
- Selvaganapathy in 2008

Member of Parliament, Lok Sabha
- Incumbent
- Assumed office 4 June 2024
- Preceded by: S. R. Parthiban
- Constituency: Salem, Tamil Nadu
- In office 6 October 1999 – 16 May 2004
- Preceded by: Vazhapadi Ramamurthy
- Succeeded by: K. V. Thankabalu
- Constituency: Salem, Tamil Nadu

Member of Parliament, Rajya Sabha
- In office 30 June 2010 – 17 April 2014
- Constituency: Tamil Nadu

Minister of Local Administration, Government of Tamil Nadu
- In office 24 June 1991 – 12 May 1996
- Governor: Bhishma Narain Singh; Marri Channa Reddy
- Chief Minister: J. Jayalalithaa
- Constituency: Tiruchengode

Member of the Legislative Assembly
- In office 1991–1996
- Preceded by: V. Ramasamy
- Succeeded by: T. P. Arumugom
- Constituency: Tiruchengode

Personal details
- Party: Dravida Munnetra Kazhagam
- Other political affiliations: All India Anna Dravida Munnetra Kazhagam (before 2008)

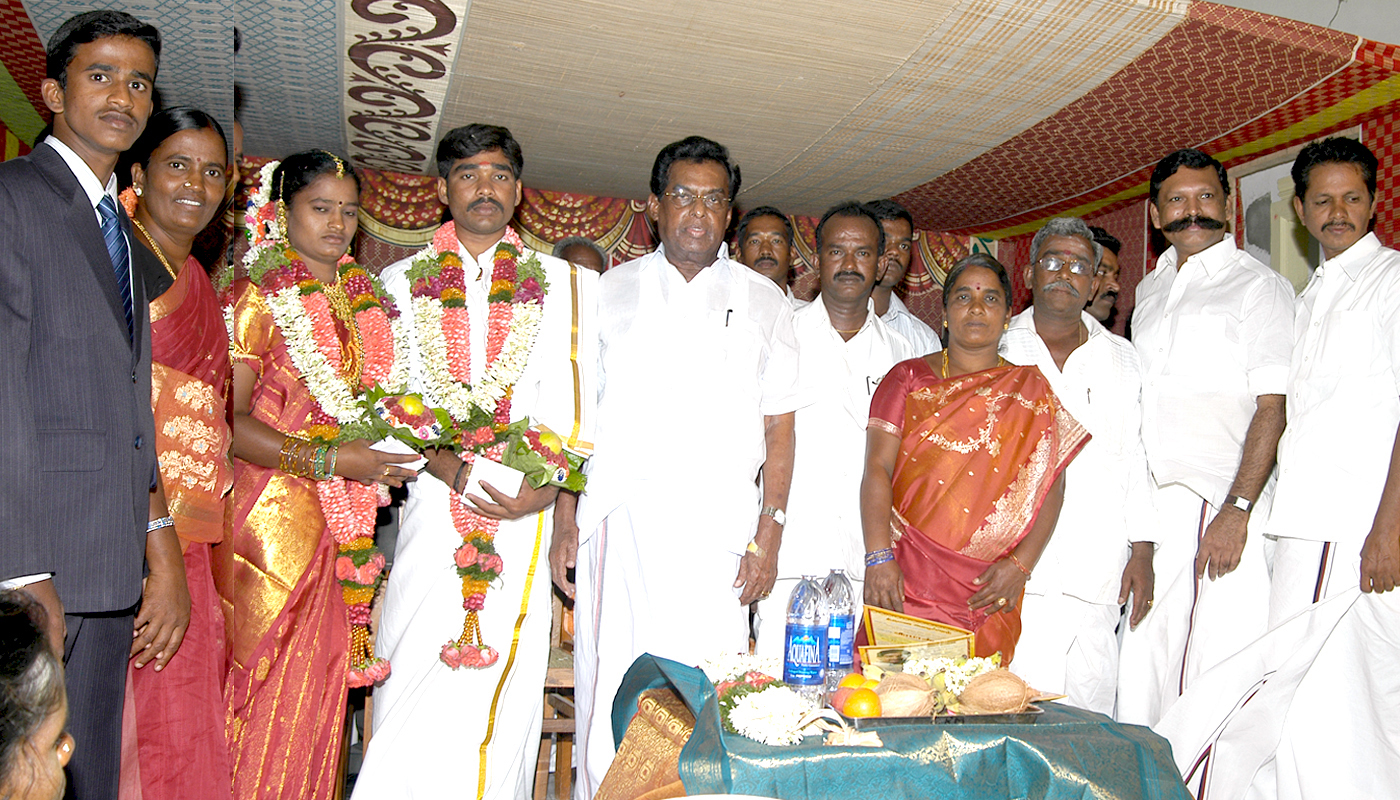
Selvaganapathy, (second from right)

T. M. Selvaganapathy is an Indian politician. He was a member of Tamil Nadu Legislative Assembly, elected from Tiruchengode constituency in 1991. He was also minister of Local Administration in Jayalalitha Government between 1991 and 1996. In 1999-2004 he was elected as Member of Parliament to the 13th Lok Sabha from Salem Constituency. Originally a member of Anna Dravida Munnetra Kazhagam party, he joined Dravida Munnetra Kazhagam in August 2008. He was convicted by a trial court in Pleasant Stay hotel case on 2 February 2000 and later acquitted by the High court on 4 December 2001. He was convicted by a trial court in Colour TV scam on 30 May 2000 and was later acquitted by the High court on 4 December 2001.

In June 2010, he became a member of the Rajya Sabha. In 2014, he was convicted by a court for a financial scam, resulting in his disqualification. He became the first Tamil Nadu politician to be disqualified from the parliament for corruption.
