= K. Kalavathi =

Member of the Legislative Assembly, Tamil Nadu Legislative Assembly
- In office 2001–2006
- Preceded by: C. Chandrasekaran
- Succeeded by: K. Ponnusamy
- Constituency: Senthamangalam

Personal details
- Born: 1 May 1956 Unanthangal
- Party: All India Anna Dravida Munnetra Kazhagam
- Profession: Farmer

K. Kalavathi is an Indian politician and a former Member of the Legislative Assembly (MLA) of Tamil Nadu. She hails from the village of Unanthangal in the Namakkal district. Having completed her high school education, Kalavathi, representing the All India Anna Dravida Munnetra Kazhagam (AIADMK), contested and won the 2001 Tamil Nadu Legislative Assembly election from the Senthamangalam Assembly constituency to become an MLA.

== Electoral Performance ==
=== 2001 ===
2001 Tamil Nadu Legislative Assembly election: Senthamangalam
Party	Candidate	Votes	%	±%
AIADMK	K. Kalavathi	61,312	55.64%	+18.57
DMK	Chinumathi Chandrasekaran	43,497	39.48%	−16.66
Independent	K. Mani	2,128	1.93%	New
MDMK	K. Saiyakali	1,467	1.33%	+0.43
Independent	V. Kuppusamy	812	0.74%	New
Margin of victory		17,815	16.17%	−2.90%
Turnout		110,186	58.37%	−5.60%
Registered electors		188,776		
AIADMK gain from DMK		Swing	-0.50%	
