= Best Ramasamy =

Indian politician

President, Kongunadu Munnetra Kazhagam

Personal details
- Born: 8 March 1946 (age 80) Tirupur
- Party: KMK
- Spouse: R. Lakshmi
- Occupation: Politician, Entrepreneur
- Website: knmkparty.org

"Best" S. Ramasamy is an Indian politician and entrepreneur from Tamil Nadu. He is the president of the Kongunadu Munnetra Kazhagam (KMK) party. He is also the chairman of "Best Group"– a group of apparel and textile companies in the city of Tirupur.

== Early life and education ==
Ramasamy was born into a small agricultural family in a place near Tirupur. His father died when he was 7 years old. Due to difficulty cultivating agricultural lands, he moved into Tirupur at the age of 12, where he became a worker in a small garment factory.

He holds B.A in Economics and in History and is fluent in Tamil, English, and Hindi.

== Business career ==
From the age of 12 to 18, he worked as an employee in a small garment factory in Tirupur. At the age of 19, he started a shop to sell firewood.

During the mid-1960s, Tirupur's garment industry grew. In 1966, when he was 20, Ramasamy started Best Knitting Company with an initial investment of ₹10,000 (US$120). He has consolidated his companies under the name Best Corporation Pvt Ltd and leads it as its chairman.

As of 2009, companies under Best Group employed more than 5,000 people in and around Tirupur.

== Political career ==
Starting in 1978, he worked in various Kongu organisations. In 1988, was one of the founders of Kongu Vellala Goundergal Peravai. In 2007, he became its president. He was declared as the president of Kongunadu Munnetra Kazhagam (KMK) when the party was launched in 2009 at Coimbatore. He contested in the 2009 Lok Sabha elections as a KMK candidate in the Pollachi constituency; he came in third with 103,004 votes.

== See also ==
- E. R. Easwaran
