= K. Ponnusamy (DMK politician) =

Indian politician (1950 or 1951 – 2025)

Member of the Tamil Nadu Legislative Assembly for Senthamangalam
- In office 12 May 2021 – 23 October 2025
- Preceded by: C. Chandrasekaran
- In office 11 May 2006 – 13 May 2011
- Preceded by: K. Kalavathi
- Succeeded by: R. Santhi

Personal details
- Born: 1950 or 1951 Kollimalai, Salem district (now in) Namakkal district, Tamil nadu India
- Died: 23 October 2025 (aged 74) Namakkal, Tamil Nadu, India
- Party: Dravida Munnetra Kazhagam
- Spouse: Jayamani
- Children: Poomalar Ponnusamy, Madhesh

K. Ponnusamy (1950 or 1951 – 23 October 2025) was an Indian politician who was a Member of Legislative Assembly of Tamil Nadu. He was elected from Senthamangalam as a Dravida Munnetra Kazhagam candidate in 2021. Ponnusamy died from a heart attack on 23 October 2025, at the age of 74.

== Elections contested ==
Election	Constituency	Party	Result	Vote %	Runner-up	Runner-up Party	Runner-up vote %	Ref.
2021 Tamil Nadu Legislative Assembly election	Senthamangalam	DMK	Won	45.51%	S. Chandran	AIADMK	40.25%	
2016 Tamil Nadu Legislative Assembly election	Senthamangalam	DMK	Lost	41.60%	C. Chandrasekaran	AIADMK	48.09%	
2011 Tamil Nadu Legislative Assembly election	Senthamangalam	DMDK	Lost	42.24%	R. Santhi	DMDK	47.51%	
