= E. R. Eswaran =

Indian politician and entrepreneur

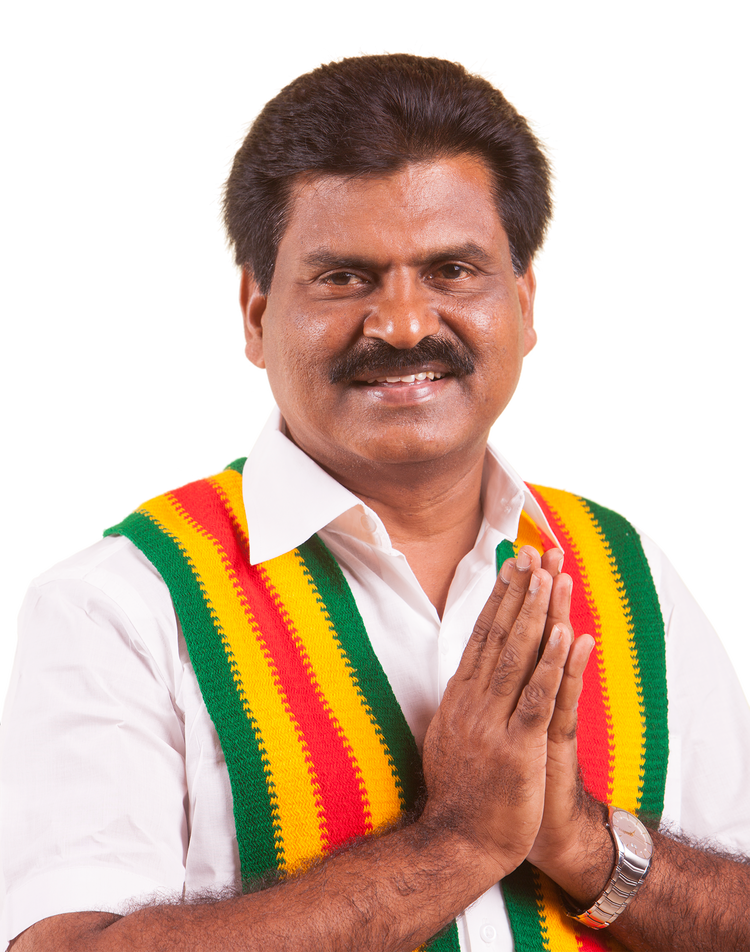

Member of the Tamil Nadu Legislative Assembly
- In office 11 May 2021 – 04 May 2026
- Preceded by: Pon. Saraswathi
- Succeeded by: K. G. Arunraj
- Constituency: Tiruchengode

General Secretary, Kongunadu Makkal Desia Katchi
- Incumbent
- Assumed office 21 March 2013
- Preceded by: position established

General Secretary, Kongunadu Munnetra Kazhagam
- In office 15 February 2009 — 21 March 2013
- President: Best Ramasamy

Personal details
- Born: 30 June 1961 (age 65) Kokkarayanpettai, Pallipalayam, India
- Party: Kongunadu Makkal Desia Katchi
- Occupation: Politician, entrepreneur

E. R. Eswaran is an Indian politician and entrepreneur from Tamil Nadu. As of 21 March 2013 he is the General Secretary of the Kongunadu Makkal Desia Katchi party and as of 2021, is a Member of the Tamil Nadu Legislative Assembly from the Tiruchengode constituency.

== Early life and education ==
Eswaran was born at Kokarayanpettai, near Thiruchengode in the Namakkal district of Tamil Nadu. His family are involved in agriculture.

He received a Bachelor of Mechanical Engineering degree from Government Engineering College, Salem. He then began his business in Assam and later moved on to Chennai where he entered the construction and infrastructure business. He soon "established himself as one of the premier builders in Chennai, promoting many apartments and townships". He also has business interests in the manufacture and export of clothing, which has caused him to travel abroad extensively.

He is fluent in Tamil, English and Hindi.

== Association with Kongu organisations ==
He was secretary of "Kongu Nanbargal Sangam" around 2001.

== Political career ==
On 21 March 2013, Eswaran was one of the founders of Kongunadu Makkal Desia Katchi, and is General Secretary of the party. He is member of the Tamil Nadu Legislative Assembly from the Tiruchengode constituency. The presence of KMDK in DMK-led alliance has worked in favour of DMK. E.R. Eswaran won by a margin of 2,862 votes in Tiruchengode. He contested the May 2009 Lok Sabha Elections as a KMDK candidate from the Coimbatore constituency and came third, securing more than one hundred thousand votes. He also came third in the 2009 by election for the Thondamuthur Assembly Constituency. For Lok sabha elections 2014, he contested Pollachi Constituency as the KMDK candidate with BJP alliance. E.R. Eswaran secured 2,76,118 votes.

== Electoral career ==
=== Lok Sabha Elections Contested ===
Election	Constituency	Party	Result	Vote %	Opposition Candidate	Opposition Party	Opposition vote %
2009 Indian general election	Coimbatore	KNMK	Lost	15.57	P. R. Natarajan	CPI(M)	35.64
2014 Indian general election	Pollachi	BJP	Lost	27.62	C. Mahendran	AIADMK	41.72

=== Tamil Nadu Legislative Assembly Elections ===
Election	Constituency	Party	Result	Vote %	Opposition Candidate	Opposition Party	Opposition vote %
2011 Tamil Nadu Legislative Assembly election	Sulur	KNMK	Lost	34.88	K. Thinakaran	DMDK	52.29
2021 Tamil Nadu Legislative Assembly election	Tiruchengode	DMK	Won	44.60	Pon. Saraswathi	AIADMK	43.04
