= Avanashi Assembly constituency =

One of the 234 State Legislative Assembly Constituencies in Tamil Nadu, in India

Coordinates: 11°10′24.68″N 77°11′31.28″E

Avanashi
- Constituency No. 112 for the Tamil Nadu Legislative Assembly

Constituency details
- Country: India
- Region: South India
- State: Tamil Nadu
- District: Tiruppur & Coimbatore
- Lok Sabha constituency: Nilgiris
- Established: 1957
- Total electors: 2,53,372
- Reservation: SC

Member of Legislative Assembly
- 17th Tamil Nadu Legislative Assembly
- Incumbent S. Kamali
- Party: TVK
- Elected year: 2026

Avanashi is a legislative assembly, that includes the city of Avanashi. Its State Assembly Constituency number is 112. Since 1977, this seat has been reserved for Scheduled Castes. Avanashi Assembly constituency is a part of Nilgiris Lok Sabha constituency. This is one of the two assembly constituencies having inter-district boundaries of limit, the other being Udumalaipettai. It is one of the 234 State Legislative Assembly Constituencies in Tamil Nadu, in India.

== Composition ==
It is composed of Annur taluk in Coimbatore district and Avinashi taluk in Tiruppur district.

== Members of the Legislative Assembly ==
Election	Member	Party
1957	K. Marappa Gounder	Indian National Congress
1962	K. Marappa Gounder	Indian National Congress
1967	R. K. Gounder	Swatantra Party
1971	T. O. Periasamy	Independent politician
1977	S. N. Palaniswamy	Indian National Congress
1980	M. Arumugam	Communist Party of India
1984	P. Lakshmi	All India Anna Dravida Munnetra Kazhagam
1989	R. Anna Nambi	All India Anna Dravida Munnetra Kazhagam
1991	M. Seeniammal	All India Anna Dravida Munnetra Kazhagam
1996	G. Elango	Dravida Munnetra Kazhagam
2001	S. Mahalingam	All India Anna Dravida Munnetra Kazhagam
2006	R. Prema	All India Anna Dravida Munnetra Kazhagam
2011	A. A. Karuppasamy	All India Anna Dravida Munnetra Kazhagam
2016	P. Dhanapal	All India Anna Dravida Munnetra Kazhagam
2021	P. Dhanapal	All India Anna Dravida Munnetra Kazhagam
2026	S. Kamali	Tamilaga Vettri Kazhagam

Madras State

== Election results ==
=== Assembly election 2026 ===
2026 Tamil Nadu Legislative Assembly election : Avanashi
Party	Candidate	Votes	%	±%
TVK	S. Kamali	84,209	36.36	New
BJP	Dr. L. Murugan	68,836	29.72	New
DMK	Dr. Gokilamani. V	65,530	28.29	▼3.28
NTK	Menaka. V	7,704	3.33	▼2.97
NOTA	None of the above	1,563	0.67	▼0.46
Margin of victory		15,373	6.64	▼17.57
Turnout		231,948	91.54	▲15.63
Total valid votes		231,600		
Registered electors		253,372		▼9.69
TVK gain from AIADMK		Swing	▼19.42	

=== Assembly election 2021 ===
2021 Tamil Nadu Legislative Assembly election : Avanashi
Party	Candidate	Votes	%	±%
AIADMK	P. Dhanapal	117,284	55.78	▲7.67
DMK	Athiyamaan Raju	66,382	31.57	▼0.74
NTK	Shoba	13,256	6.30	▲5.52
MNM	A. Venkateswaran	8,379	3.99	New
DMDK	K. Meera	2,577	1.23	New
NOTA	None of the above	2,372	1.13	▼0.69
Margin of victory		50,902	24.21	▲8.40
Turnout		212,965	75.91	▼1.88
Total valid votes		210,255		
Rejected ballots		338	0.16	▲0.12
Registered electors		280,560		▲12.42
AIADMK hold		Swing		

=== Assembly election 2016 ===
2016 Tamil Nadu Legislative Assembly election : Avanashi
Party	Candidate	Votes	%	±%
AIADMK	P. Dhanapal	93,366	48.11	▼18.49
DMK	E. Anandhan	62,692	32.31	New
CPI	M. Arumugam	15,016	7.74	New
BJP	C. Perumal	8,081	4.16	▲0.67
KMDK	B. Pragatheeswaran	4,373	2.25	New
NOTA	None of the above	3,534	1.82	New
NTK	P. Sumathi	1,514	0.78	New
PMK	K. K. Marimuthu	1,480	0.76	New
Margin of victory		30,674	15.81	▼23.90
Turnout		194,139	77.79	▼2.51
Total valid votes		194,062		
Rejected ballots		77	0.04	▼0.04
Registered electors		249,571		▲29.48
AIADMK hold		Swing		

=== Assembly election 2011 ===
2011 Tamil Nadu Legislative Assembly election : Avanashi
Party	Candidate	Votes	%	±%
AIADMK	A. A. Karuppasamy	103,002	66.60	▲26.03
INC	A. R. Natarajan	41,591	26.89	New
BJP	R. Rangasamy	5,405	3.49	New
Independent	V. Jaya	2,798	1.81	
Independent	R. Moorthy	1,858	1.20	
Margin of victory		61,411	39.71	▲36.33
Turnout		154,774	80.30	▲9.65
Total valid votes		154,654		
Rejected ballots		120	0.08	▲0.08
Registered electors		192,750		▲1.21
AIADMK hold		Swing		

=== Assembly election 2006 ===
2006 Tamil Nadu Legislative Assembly election : Avanashi
Party	Candidate	Votes	%	±%
AIADMK	R. Prema	54,562	40.57	New
CPI	M. Arumugam	50,023	37.20	New
DMDK	M. Anandharaj	14,570	10.83	New
Independent	M. Mohanraj	11,146	8.29	
BSP	P. Ramasamy	1,535	1.14	New
Independent	K. Nainan	1,021	0.76	
Margin of victory		4,539	3.38	▼13.62
Turnout		134,556	70.65	▲4.67
Total valid votes		134,476		
Registered electors		190,450		▲1.68
AIADMK gain from AIADMK		Swing	▼7.63	

=== Assembly election 2001 ===
2001 Tamil Nadu Legislative Assembly election : Avanashi
Party	Candidate	Votes	%	±%
AIADMK	S. Mahalingam	59,571	48.20	▲14.33
Independent	M. Mohankumar	38,559	31.20	
DMK	Radhamani Thirumathi	17,126	13.86	▼42.67
MDMK	R. Anna Nambi	4,052	3.28	▼3.51
Independent	P. Rajendran	2,597	2.10	
Independent	M. P. Sengottaian	1,674	1.35	
Margin of victory		21,012	17.00	▼5.66
Turnout		123,580	65.98	▼4.66
Total valid votes		123,579		
Registered electors		187,295		▲5.99
AIADMK gain from DMK		Swing	▼8.33	

=== Assembly election 1996 ===
1996 Tamil Nadu Legislative Assembly election : Avanashi
Party	Candidate	Votes	%	±%
DMK	G. Elango	66,006	56.53	New
AIADMK	M. Thiagarajan	39,549	33.87	New
MDMK	R. Shanmuga Sundharam	7,922	6.79	New
BJP	M. Palanisamy	2,042	1.75	▼2.74
Margin of victory		26,457	22.66	▼23.42
Turnout		124,824	70.64	▲3.70
Total valid votes		116,757		
Rejected ballots		8,072	6.47	▼0.29
Registered electors		176,709		▲10.10
DMK gain from AIADMK		Swing	▼13.14	

=== Assembly election 1991 ===
1991 Tamil Nadu Legislative Assembly election : Avanashi
Party	Candidate	Votes	%	±%
AIADMK	M. Seeniammal	69,774	69.67	New
CPI	M. Arumugam	23,625	23.59	New
BJP	M. Palanisamy	4,493	4.49	New
JP	K. M. Jayaraj	972	0.97	New
Margin of victory		46,149	46.08	▲44.01
Turnout		107,440	66.94	▲23.00
Total valid votes		100,149		
Rejected ballots		7,266	6.76	▲3.84
Registered electors		160,494		▼34.30
AIADMK gain from AIADMK		Swing	▲37.07	

=== Assembly election 1989 ===
1989 Tamil Nadu Legislative Assembly election : Avanashi
Party	Candidate	Votes	%	±%
AIADMK	R. Anna Nambi	33,964	32.60	New
DMK	C. T. Dhandapani	31,806	30.53	New
INC	S. N. Palaniswamy	30,974	29.73	New
Independent	K. S. Chandramohan	5,028	4.83	
Independent	Koval Ganesan	1,570	1.51	
Independent	N. Subburaju	854	0.82	
Margin of victory		2,158	2.07	▼37.13
Turnout		107,333	43.94	▼27.41
Total valid votes		104,196		
Rejected ballots		3,137	2.92	▼4.49
Registered electors		244,291		▲85.10
AIADMK gain from AIADMK		Swing	▼34.70	

=== Assembly election 1984 ===
1984 Tamil Nadu Legislative Assembly election : Avanashi
Party	Candidate	Votes	%	±%
AIADMK	P. Lakshmi	58,677	67.30	New
CPI	M. Arumugam	24,504	28.11	▼26.11
Independent	K. Nanjan	1,336	1.53	
Independent	C. A. Ponnusamy	1,094	1.25	
Independent	V. Ramaswamy	979	1.12	
Independent	A. S. Saraswathi	597	0.68	
Margin of victory		34,173	39.20	▲23.45
Turnout		94,161	71.35	▲23.42
Total valid votes		87,187		
Rejected ballots		6,974	7.41	▲5.47
Registered electors		131,978		▲1.02
AIADMK gain from CPI		Swing	▲13.08	

=== Assembly election 1980 ===
1980 Tamil Nadu Legislative Assembly election : Avanashi
Party	Candidate	Votes	%	±%
CPI	M. Arumugam	33,294	54.22	New
INC	S. N. Palaniswamy	23,623	38.47	▲6.21
JP	K. P. Palanisamy	4,492	7.31	New
Margin of victory		9,671	15.75	▲13.25
Turnout		62,625	47.93	▼10.29
Total valid votes		61,409		
Rejected ballots		1,216	1.94	▼0.13
Registered electors		130,646		▲6.56
CPI gain from INC		Swing	▲21.96	

=== Assembly election 1977 ===
1977 Tamil Nadu Legislative Assembly election : Avanashi
Party	Candidate	Votes	%	±%
INC	S. N. Palaniswamy	22,550	32.26	New
AIADMK	R. Anna Nambi	20,803	29.76	New
JP	P. Perumal	15,119	21.63	New
DMK	B. Chinnan	9,431	13.49	▼35.19
Independent	G. Elango	1,087	1.55	
Independent	T. S. Chinnasamv	917	1.31	
Margin of victory		1,747	2.50	▲1.28
Turnout		71,384	58.22	▼12.30
Total valid votes		69,907		
Rejected ballots		1,477	2.07	▲2.07
Registered electors		122,608		▲34.38
INC gain from Independent		Swing	▼17.64	

=== Assembly election 1971 ===
1971 Tamil Nadu Legislative Assembly election : Avanashi
Party	Candidate	Votes	%	±%
Independent	T. O. Periasamy	29,356	49.90	
DMK	K. Thangavellu	28,637	48.68	New
Independent	T. P. Maruthachalam	835	1.42	
Margin of victory		719	1.22	▼7.50
Turnout		64,345	70.52	▼0.58
Total valid votes		58,828		
Registered electors		91,240		▲4.54
Independent gain from SWA		Swing	▼4.46	

=== Assembly election 1967 ===
1967 Madras State Legislative Assembly election : Avanashi
Party	Candidate	Votes	%	±%
SWA	R. K. Gounder	31,927	54.36	▲30.42
INC	K. M. Gounder	26,808	45.64	▼7.38
Margin of victory		5,119	8.72	▼20.36
Turnout		62,055	71.10	▲4.37
Total valid votes		58,735		
Registered electors		87,279		▲7.97
SWA gain from INC		Swing	▲1.34	

=== Assembly election 1962 ===
1962 Madras State Legislative Assembly election : Avanashi
Party	Candidate	Votes	%	±%
INC	K. Marappa Gounder	27,009	53.02	▼7.23
SWA	M. Ponnusami	12,196	23.94	New
CPI	I. M. Sherrif	6,698	13.15	New
DMK	Ponniya Gounder	5,037	9.89	New
Margin of victory		14,813	29.08	▲8.59
Turnout		53,943	66.73	▲24.61
Total valid votes		50,940		
Registered electors		80,839		▼0.97
INC hold		Swing		

=== Assembly election 1957 ===
1957 Madras State Legislative Assembly election : Avanashi
Party	Candidate	Votes	%	±%
INC	K. Marappa Gounder	20,716	60.25	New
Independent	Karuppa Gounder	13,670	39.75	New
Margin of victory		7,046	20.49	
Turnout		34,386	42.12	
Total valid votes		34,386		
Registered electors		81,634		
INC win (new seat)				
