= P. R. Sundaram =

Indian politician (1951–2025)

Member of Parliament, Lok Sabha
- In office 1 September 2014 – 23 May 2019
- Preceded by: S. Gandhiselvan
- Succeeded by: A. K. P. Chinraj
- Constituency: Namakkal

Member of Tamil Nadu Legislative Assembly
- In office 9 May 1996 — 11 May 2006
- Preceded by: K. Palaniammal
- Succeeded by: K. P. Ramaswamy
- Constituency: Rasipuram

Personal details
- Born: 2 April 1951 Pachudaiyampalayam, Salem district, Madras State (now Namakkal district, Tamil Nadu), India
- Died: 15 January 2025 (aged 73) Rasipuram, Namakkal district, Tamil Nadu, India
- Party: Dravida Munnetra Kazhagam (2021-2025)
- Other political affiliations: All India Anna Dravida Munnetra Kazhagam (1972-2021)
- Spouse: Sundari
- Children: Dinesh Sundaram
- Education: Annamalai University
- Occupation: Agriculturist
- As of 17 December, 2016

P. R. Sundaram (2 April 1951 – 15 January 2025) was an Indian politician. Sundaram was a Member of the Legislative Assembly of Tamil Nadu. He was elected to the Tamil Nadu legislative assembly as an Anna Dravida Munnetra Kazhagam candidate from Rasipuram constituency in the 1996 and 2001 elections.

Sundaram was elected to the Lok Sabha representing Namakkal in the 2014 elections.

Sundaram died on 15 January 2025, at the age of 73.
