= K. G. Arunraj =

Indian politician from Tamil Nadu

Minister for Health and Family Welfare Government of Tamil Nadu
- Incumbent
- Assumed office 10 May 2026
- Governor: R. V. Arlekar
- Chief Minister: C. Joseph Vijay
- Ministry and Departments: Health, Medical Education and Family Welfare
- Preceded by: Ma. Subramanian

Member of the Tamil Nadu Legislative Assembly
- Incumbent
- Assumed office 4 May 2026
- Preceded by: E. R. Eswaran (KMDK)
- Constituency: Tiruchengode

Indian Revenue Service officer
- In office 21 December 2009 – 2025
- Rank: Joint Commissioner; Additional Commissioner of Income Tax
- Region: Bihar and Jharkhand

Personal details
- Party: Tamilaga Vettri Kazhagam (TVK)
- Education: Madras Medical College (MBBS, 2002)
- Occupation: Politician, Former IRS Officer, Physician

K. G. Arunraj is an Indian politician, doctor, former civil servant, and physician from Tamil Nadu. He is the cabinet Minister for Health and Family Welfare of Tamil Nadu. He was elected as a Member of Legislative Assembly from Tiruchengode in Namakkal district, in the 2026 Tamil Nadu Legislative Assembly election. Prior to contesting the election, he served as general secretary (policy and propaganda) of the Tamilaga Vettri Kazhagam (TVK). Before entering politics, he was an officer in the Indian Revenue Service (IRS), holding the ranks of Joint Commissioner and Additional Commissioner of Income Tax.

== Early life and education ==
Arunraj is from Salem, Tamil Nadu. He completed his MBBS from Madras Medical College, affiliated with The Tamil Nadu Dr. M.G.R. Medical University, in 2002. After graduating, he worked as a physician in rural areas including Krishnagiri district.

== Civil service career ==
Arunraj cleared the Union Public Service Commission (UPSC) Civil Services Examination in 2009 and joined the Indian Revenue Service (IRS). During his service, he held positions including Joint Commissioner and Additional Commissioner of Income Tax, with postings in Tamil Nadu, Bihar, and Maharashtra.

In 2016, he led an Income Tax raid that resulted in the seizure of ₹90 crore in cash from the premises of businessman Shekar Reddy and his associates. He was also involved in investigations related to the Kodanadu estate case and matters connected to associates of V. K. Sasikala.

In 2021, the Election Commission of India directed that Arunraj, then serving as Joint Commissioner, be transferred and attached to the Central Board of Direct Taxes (CBDT) headquarters with immediate effect, during the assembly election preparedness review in Tamil Nadu.

He maintained a blog from 2009 in which he wrote on topics including electoral reform, prohibition, and corruption. In May 2025, he took voluntary retirement from the IRS, with his resignation accepted on 22 May 2025.

== Political career ==
=== Tamilaga Vettri Kazhagam ===
In June 2025, Arunraj joined the Tamilaga Vettri Kazhagam (TVK), the political party founded by actor Vijay on 2 February 2024. He was appointed general secretary (policy and propaganda) of the party. In this role, he headed the party's manifesto committee and conducted public consultations across Tamil Nadu ahead of the 2026 elections.

TVK contested all 233 assembly constituencies in Tamil Nadu in the 2026 elections, winning 108 seats and becoming the single largest party in the state.

=== 2026 Tamil Nadu Legislative Assembly election ===
In the 2026 Tamil Nadu Legislative Assembly election, Arunraj contested from the Tiruchengode assembly constituency in Namakkal district, which falls under the Namakkal Lok Sabha constituency. The constituency has a history of close elections; the 2021 result was decided by a margin of 2,862 votes and the 2016 result by 3,390 votes. The constituency recorded a voter turnout of 89.97% in the 2026 polls.

Arunraj won the seat, defeating R. Chandrasekar of the AIADMK and E. R. Eswaran of the KMDK.

2026 Tamil Nadu Legislative Assembly election result: Tiruchengode
Party	Candidate	Votes	%	±%
TVK	K. G. Arunraj	79,500	41.60	
AIADMK	SRMT Sekar (A) Chandrasekar R	51,328	26.86	
DMK	E. R. Eswaran	49,465	25.88	
NTK	K. Revathi	6,085	3.18	
Majority		28,172	14.74	

== Electoral history ==
Year	Election	Constituency	Party	Result	Votes	Margin
2026	Tamil Nadu Assembly Election	Tiruchengode	Tamilaga Vettri Kazhagam	Won	79,500	28,172

== See also ==
- 2026 Tamil Nadu Legislative Assembly election
- Tamilaga Vettri Kazhagam
- C. Joseph Vijay
- Indian Revenue Service
