= Senthamangalam Assembly constituency =

State Legislative Assembly Constituency in Tamil Nadu

Coordinates: 11.28°N 78.23°E

Senthamangalam
- Constituency No. 93 for the Tamil Nadu Legislative Assembly

Constituency details
- Country: India
- Region: South India
- State: Tamil Nadu
- District: Namakkal
- Lok Sabha constituency: Namakkal
- Established: 1957
- Total electors: 2,29,482
- Reservation: ST

Member of Legislative Assembly
- 17th Tamil Nadu Legislative Assembly
- Incumbent P. Chandrasekar
- Party: TVK
- Elected year: 2026

Senthamangalam is a state assembly constituency in Tamil Nadu, India, that was formed after constituency delimitations in 1957. Its State Assembly Constituency number is 93. The seat is reserved for candidates from the Scheduled Tribes and comprises portions of Rasipuram and Namakkal taluks. It is a part of the wider Namakkal Lok Sabha constituency for national elections to the Parliament of India. It is one of the 234 State Legislative Assembly Constituencies in Tamil Nadu in India.

Prior to the 2008 delimitation exercise, the local constituency was called Sendamangalam. That, too, was reserved for candidates from the Scheduled Tribes.

== Members of Legislative Assembly ==
=== Madras State ===
| Year | Winner | Party |
|---|---|---|
| 1957 | T. Sivagnanam Pillai | Indian National Congress |
| 1962 | V. R. Periyannan | Dravida Munnetra Kazhagam |
| 1967 | A. S. Gounder | Indian National Congress |

=== Tamil Nadu ===
| Year | Winner | Party |
|---|---|---|
| 1971 | Chinna Velaiya Gounder | Dravida Munnetra Kazhagam |
| 1977 | V. Chinnasamy | All India Anna Dravida Munnetra Kazhagam |
| 1980 | S. Sivaprakasam | All India Anna Dravida Munnetra Kazhagam |
| 1984 | S. Sivaprakasam | All India Anna Dravida Munnetra Kazhagam |
| 1989 | K. Chinnasamy | All India Anna Dravida Munnetra Kazhagam |
| 1991 | K. Chinnasamy | All India Anna Dravida Munnetra Kazhagam |
| 1996 | C. Chandrasekaran | Dravida Munnetra Kazhagam |
| 2001 | K. Kalavathi | All India Anna Dravida Munnetra Kazhagam |
| 2006 | K. Ponnusamy | Dravida Munnetra Kazhagam |
| 2011 | R. Santhi | Desiya Murpokku Dravida Kazhagam |
| 2016 | C. Chandrasekaran | All India Anna Dravida Munnetra Kazhagam |
| 2021 | K. Ponnusamy | Dravida Munnetra Kazhagam |
| 2026 | P. Chandrasekar | Tamilaga Vettri Kazhagam |

== Election results ==
Vote share of winning candidates
| 2026 | 32.82% |
| 2021 | 45.51% |
| 2016 | 48.09% |
| 2011 | 47.51% |
| 2006 | 49.91% |
| 2001 | 55.64% |
| 1996 | 56.14% |
| 1991 | 76.19% |
| 1989 | 37.46% |
| 1984 | 64.17% |
| 1980 | 54.44% |
| 1977 | 45.10% |
| 1971 | 56.92% |
| 1967 | 50.62% |
| 1962 | 53.39% |
| 1957 | 58.34% |

=== 2026 ===
2026 Tamil Nadu Legislative Assembly election: Senthamangalam
| Party | Candidate | Votes | % | ±% |
|---|---|---|---|---|
| TVK | P. Chandrasekar | 68,815 | 32.82 | New |
| AIADMK | C. Chandrasekaran | 66,160 | 31.55 | ▼8.70 |
| DMK | P. Poomalar | 64,951 | 30.98 | ▼14.53 |
| NTK | Ponnumani C | 6,478 | 3.09 | ▼2.76 |
| NOTA | NOTA | 1,211 | 0.58 | ▼0.45 |
| Margin of victory | | 2,655 | 1.27 | ▼4.00 |
| Turnout | | 2,09,687 | 91.37 | ▲9.53 |
| Registered electors | | 2,29,482 | | ▼13,975 |
| TVK gain from DMK | | Swing | ▲32.82 | |

=== 2021 ===
2021 Tamil Nadu Legislative Assembly election: Senthamangalam
| Party | Candidate | Votes | % | ±% |
|---|---|---|---|---|
| DMK | K. Ponnusamy | 90,681 | 45.51% | +3.91 |
| AIADMK | S. Chandran | 80,188 | 40.25% | −7.85 |
| NTK | T. Rohini | 11,654 | 5.85% | +4.68 |
| Independent | C. Chandrasekaran | 11,371 | 5.71% | New |
| NOTA | NOTA | 2,058 | 1.03% | −0.37 |
| Margin of victory | | 10,493 | 5.27% | −1.23% |
| Turnout | | 199,235 | 81.84% | −0.77% |
| Rejected ballots | | 595 | 0.30% | |
| Registered electors | | 243,457 | | |
| DMK gain from AIADMK | | Swing | -2.58% | |

=== 2016 ===
2016 Tamil Nadu Legislative Assembly election: Senthamangalam
| Party | Candidate | Votes | % | ±% |
|---|---|---|---|---|
| AIADMK | C. Chandrasekaran | 91,339 | 48.09% | New |
| DMK | K. Ponnusamy | 79,006 | 41.60% | −0.64 |
| DMDK | M. Sathiya | 5,609 | 2.95% | −44.56 |
| KMDK | M. Chinnusamy | 4,014 | 2.11% | New |
| NOTA | NOTA | 2,664 | 1.40% | New |
| PMK | K. Susila | 2,447 | 1.29% | New |
| NTK | R. Anbuthambi | 2,219 | 1.17% | New |
| Margin of victory | | 12,333 | 6.49% | 1.22% |
| Turnout | | 189,917 | 82.60% | 1.02% |
| Registered electors | | 229,911 | | |
| AIADMK gain from DMDK | | Swing | 0.58% | |

=== 2011 ===
2011 Tamil Nadu Legislative Assembly election: Senthamangalam
| Party | Candidate | Votes | % | ±% |
|---|---|---|---|---|
| DMDK | R. Santhi | 76,637 | 47.51% | +38.42 |
| DMK | K. Ponnusamy | 68,132 | 42.24% | −7.67 |
| Independent | T. Santhi | 5,208 | 3.23% | New |
| Independent | Ambala Ponnusamy | 3,745 | 2.32% | New |
| IJK | V. Palanisamy | 3,392 | 2.10% | New |
| BJP | C. Ramesh | 2,966 | 1.84% | +0.36 |
| Independent | K. Shanmugam | 1,215 | 0.75% | New |
| Margin of victory | | 8,505 | 5.27% | −7.52% |
| Turnout | | 161,295 | 81.59% | 10.75% |
| Registered electors | | 197,693 | | |
| DMDK gain from DMK | | Swing | -2.40% | |

=== 2006 ===
2006 Tamil Nadu Legislative Assembly election: Senthamangalam
| Party | Candidate | Votes | % | ±% |
|---|---|---|---|---|
| DMK | K. Ponnusamy | 64,506 | 49.91% | +10.44 |
| AIADMK | P. Chandran | 47,972 | 37.12% | −18.53 |
| DMDK | R. Santhi | 11,747 | 9.09% | New |
| BJP | K. Kuppusamy | 1,913 | 1.48% | New |
| Independent | C. Chandrasekaran | 1,612 | 1.25% | New |
| Independent | C. Chandrasekaran | 1,490 | 1.15% | New |
| Margin of victory | | 16,534 | 12.79% | −3.37% |
| Turnout | | 129,240 | 70.84% | 12.47% |
| Registered electors | | 182,451 | | |
| DMK gain from AIADMK | | Swing | -5.73% | |

=== 2001 ===
2001 Tamil Nadu Legislative Assembly election: Senthamangalam
| Party | Candidate | Votes | % | ±% |
|---|---|---|---|---|
| AIADMK | K. Kalavathi | 61,312 | 55.64% | +18.57 |
| DMK | Chinumathi Chandrasekaran | 43,497 | 39.48% | −16.66 |
| Independent | K. Mani | 2,128 | 1.93% | New |
| MDMK | K. Saiyakali | 1,467 | 1.33% | +0.43 |
| Independent | V. Kuppusamy | 812 | 0.74% | New |
| Margin of victory | | 17,815 | 16.17% | −2.90% |
| Turnout | | 110,186 | 58.37% | −5.60% |
| Registered electors | | 188,776 | | |
| AIADMK gain from DMK | | Swing | -0.50% | |

=== 1996 ===
1996 Tamil Nadu Legislative Assembly election: Senthamangalam
| Party | Candidate | Votes | % | ±% |
|---|---|---|---|---|
| DMK | C. Chandrasekaran | 58,673 | 56.14% | New |
| AIADMK | K. Kalavathi | 38,748 | 37.08% | −39.11 |
| PMK | P. Allimuthu | 3,449 | 3.30% | New |
| Independent | S. Sivaprakasam | 2,576 | 2.46% | New |
| MDMK | S. Thennavan | 938 | 0.90% | New |
| Margin of victory | | 19,925 | 19.06% | −39.02% |
| Turnout | | 104,512 | 63.97% | 4.37% |
| Registered electors | | 173,166 | | |
| DMK gain from AIADMK | | Swing | -20.05% | |

=== 1991 ===
1991 Tamil Nadu Legislative Assembly election: Senthamangalam
| Party | Candidate | Votes | % | ±% |
|---|---|---|---|---|
| AIADMK | K. Chinnasamy | 72,877 | 76.19% | +38.73 |
| Thayaga Marumalarchi Kazhagam | S. Sivaprakasam | 17,316 | 18.10% | New |
| PMK | M. S. Chandiran | 5,460 | 5.71% | New |
| Margin of victory | | 55,561 | 58.09% | 52.91% |
| Turnout | | 95,653 | 59.60% | −4.66% |
| Registered electors | | 169,962 | | |
| AIADMK hold | | Swing | 38.73% | |

=== 1989 ===
1989 Tamil Nadu Legislative Assembly election: Senthamangalam
| Party | Candidate | Votes | % | ±% |
|---|---|---|---|---|
| AIADMK | K. Chinnasamy | 36,489 | 37.46% | −26.71 |
| DMK | C. Alagappan | 31,452 | 32.29% | +1.14 |
| INC | T. S. Thiruman | 17,158 | 17.62% | New |
| AIADMK | V. K. Ayyasamy | 9,067 | 9.31% | −54.86 |
| Independent | K. K. Chinnasamy | 3,153 | 3.24% | New |
| Margin of victory | | 5,037 | 5.17% | −27.85% |
| Turnout | | 97,400 | 64.26% | −1.90% |
| Registered electors | | 155,493 | | |
| AIADMK hold | | Swing | -26.71% | |

=== 1984 ===
1984 Tamil Nadu Legislative Assembly election: Senthamangalam
| Party | Candidate | Votes | % | ±% |
|---|---|---|---|---|
| AIADMK | S. Sivaprakasam | 54,129 | 64.17% | +9.73 |
| DMK | S. Kalavathi | 26,277 | 31.15% | New |
| Independent | V. Chinnasamy | 3,944 | 4.68% | New |
| Margin of victory | | 27,852 | 33.02% | 22.83% |
| Turnout | | 84,350 | 66.16% | 12.12% |
| Registered electors | | 137,028 | | |
| AIADMK hold | | Swing | 9.73% | |

=== 1980 ===
1980 Tamil Nadu Legislative Assembly election: Senthamangalam
| Party | Candidate | Votes | % | ±% |
|---|---|---|---|---|
| AIADMK | S. Sivaprakasam | 37,577 | 54.44% | +9.35 |
| INC | Vadama Gounder | 30,543 | 44.25% | +22.47 |
| Independent | V. Rajagopal | 900 | 1.30% | New |
| Margin of victory | | 7,034 | 10.19% | −13.12% |
| Turnout | | 69,020 | 54.04% | 2.90% |
| Registered electors | | 129,835 | | |
| AIADMK hold | | Swing | 9.35% | |

=== 1977 ===
1977 Tamil Nadu Legislative Assembly election: Senthamangalam
| Party | Candidate | Votes | % | ±% |
|---|---|---|---|---|
| AIADMK | V. Chinnasamy | 28,731 | 45.10% | New |
| INC | Vadama Gounder | 13,881 | 21.79% | −13.6 |
| DMK | Chinna Vellaiyan | 9,886 | 15.52% | −41.4 |
| JP | Chakravarthy Duraisamy | 9,752 | 15.31% | New |
| Independent | M. R. Kali Gounder | 1,462 | 2.29% | New |
| Margin of victory | | 14,850 | 23.31% | 1.78% |
| Turnout | | 63,712 | 51.14% | −8.86% |
| Registered electors | | 126,719 | | |
| AIADMK gain from DMK | | Swing | -11.82% | |

=== 1971 ===
1971 Tamil Nadu Legislative Assembly election: Senthamangalam
| Party | Candidate | Votes | % | ±% |
|---|---|---|---|---|
| DMK | Chinna Veilaiya Gounder | 34,507 | 56.92% | New |
| INC | Vellaya Gounder | 21,452 | 35.38% | −15.24 |
| Independent | Nevadia Vaiyapuri Gounder | 4,670 | 7.70% | New |
| Margin of victory | | 13,055 | 21.53% | 20.29% |
| Turnout | | 60,629 | 60.00% | −6.24% |
| Registered electors | | 104,818 | | |
| DMK gain from INC | | Swing | 6.29% | |

=== 1967 ===
1967 Madras Legislative Assembly election: Senthamangalam
| Party | Candidate | Votes | % | ±% |
|---|---|---|---|---|
| INC | A. S. Gounder | 31,308 | 50.62% | +4.02 |
| CPI(M) | S. T. Doraiswamy | 30,537 | 49.38% | New |
| Margin of victory | | 771 | 1.25% | −5.54% |
| Turnout | | 61,845 | 66.24% | −1.65% |
| Registered electors | | 97,553 | | |
| INC gain from DMK | | Swing | -2.77% | |

=== 1962 ===
1962 Madras Legislative Assembly election: Senthamangalam
| Party | Candidate | Votes | % | ±% |
|---|---|---|---|---|
| DMK | V. R. Periannan | 27,728 | 53.39% | New |
| INC | P. B. K. Thiagaraja Reddiar | 24,205 | 46.61% | −11.73 |
| Margin of victory | | 3,523 | 6.78% | −9.90% |
| Turnout | | 51,933 | 67.89% | 15.36% |
| Registered electors | | 78,651 | | |
| DMK gain from INC | | Swing | -4.95% | |

=== 1957 ===
1957 Madras Legislative Assembly election: Senthamangalam
| Party | Candidate | Votes | % | ±% |
|---|---|---|---|---|
| INC | T. Sivagnanam Pillai | 23,749 | 58.34% | New |
| Independent | Somasundara Gounder | 16,959 | 41.66% | New |
| Margin of victory | | 6,790 | 16.68% | |
| Turnout | | 40,708 | 52.53% | |
| Registered electors | | 77,493 | | |
| INC win (new seat) | | | | |
