= P. Chandrasekar =

Indian politician (born 1974)

Ponnusamy Chandrasekar (born 1974) is an Indian politician from Tamil Nadu. He is a member of the Tamil Nadu Legislative Assembly from the Senthamangalam Assembly constituency, which is reserved for Scheduled Tribe community, in Namakkal district representing the Tamilaga Vettri Kazhagam.

== Early life and education ==
Chandrasekar is from Senthamangalam, Namakkal district, Tamil Nadu. He is the son of Ponnusamy. He did his schooling at Mahatma Gandhi High School, Villupuram and passed Class 10 examinations in 1989. Later, he studied Class 12 at Kamarar Higher School, Villupuram and passed out in 1991. Then he did Bachelor of Arts before and completed Bachelor of Law at Government Law College, Tiruchirapalli in 2001. He is a practicing lawyer and declared assets worth Rs.56 lakhs in his affidavit to the Election Commission of India.

== Career ==
Chandrasekar won the Senthamangalam Assembly constituency representing the Tamilaga Vettri Kazhagam in the 2026 Tamil Nadu Legislative Assembly election. He polled 68,815 votes and defeated his nearest rival, C. Chandrasekaran of the All India Anna Dravida Munnetra Kazhagam, by a margin of 2,655 votes.
