= Chinnasamy =

Chinnasamy is an Indian given name and surname. Notable people with the name include:

- K. Chinnasamy, Indian politician
- R. Chinnasamy, Indian politician
- M. Chinnasamy, Indian politician
- T. Chinnasamy, Indian politician
- V. K. Chinnasamy, Indian politician
- Nalli Chinnasamy Chetti, Indian wardrobe store founder
- Bharatiraja (Chinnasaamy Periyamaya), Indian film director

== See also ==
- M. Chinnaswamy Stadium, cricket stadium in India
