= S. Mahalingam (MLA) =

- சு. மகாலிங்கம்

Member of the Tamil Nadu Legislative Assembly
- In office 2001–2006
- Preceded by: G. Elango
- Succeeded by: R. Prema
- Constituency: Avinashi

Personal details
- Born: 4 March 1971 (age 55) Samanthankottai, Tiruppur district, Tamil Nadu, India
- Party: All India Anna Dravida Munnetra Kazhagam
- Education: Bachelor of Science (B.Sc.)
- Profession: Powerloom business

S. Mahalingam is an Indian politician and a former member of the Tamil Nadu Legislative Assembly. He hails from Avinashi in the Tiruppur district. A graduate with a Bachelor of Science (B.Sc.) degree, Mahalingam is a member of the All India Anna Dravida Munnetra Kazhagam (AIADMK) party. He was elected to the Tamil Nadu Legislative Assembly from the Avanashi Assembly constituency in the 2001 state elections.

== Electoral performance ==
Election	Constituency	Political party	Result	Vote %	Opposition			Ref
Election	Constituency	Political party	Result	Vote %	Candidate	Political party	Vote %	Ref
2001	Avanashi	AIADMK	Won	48.20%	M. Mohankumar	Independent	31.20%	
