= Colour TV case =

Corruption case in Tamil Nadu, India

- Date: 14 May 1998
- Location: Chennai
- Participants: Jayalalithaa, Sasikala, T. M. Selvaganapathy
- Charges: Misuse of office, Corruption, Criminal conspiracy
- Verdict: High Court: All acquitted of all charges; Trial Court: Jayalalitha, Sasikala acquitted; Five year imprisonment for seven others, including Selvaganapathy
- Litigation: 11 years

The Colour TV case was a legal case against J. Jayalalithaa, the late Chief Minister of Tamil Nadu, a state in South India from 1991–1996. J.Jayalalithaa, her associate VK Sasikala, and her ministerial colleague T. M. Selvaganapathy were charged with misusing their office to buy colour televisions at a higher price than quoted, then receiving substantial kickbacks. Jayalalithaa, Sasikala, and seven others were arrested and remanded to judicial custody on 7 December 1996. The case and chargesheet were filed during the Dravida Munnetra Kazhagam (DMK) government headed by M. Karunanidhi in 1998. On 30 May 2000, Jayalalithaa and Sasikala were acquitted while a lower court convicted Selvaganapathy and six others and sentenced them to five years of rigorous imprisonment with a fine of ₹10,000 (US$200). It was one of the first instances where an ex-chief minister was arrested and sent to jail and one of the earliest examples of the conviction of a Member of Parliament in a corruption case. Selvaganapathy was a member of Parliament from the Tiruchengode constituency in Lok Sabha at the time of the verdict.

The Madras High Court acquitted Jayalalithaa and all others who were convicted in the case on 4 December 2001.

== Background ==
Jayalalithaa was an Indian politician and four-time Chief Minister of Tamil Nadu from 1991–1996, 2002–06, 2011–14, and 2015–2016 from the All India Anna Dravida Munnetra Kazhagam (AIADMK) party. During her first tenure as Chief Minister, there were irregularities about the purchase of 45,000 colour television sets for village panchayats, which cost ₹10.16 crores (US$2,090,000). The ruling DMK government, headed by Muthuvel Karunanidhi, filed a case in 1996 and a chargesheet in 1998. Jayalalithaa was arrested on 7 December 1996 and was remanded to judicial custody in connection with the case. The investigation alleged that the amount acquired through the TV dealers was routed in the form of cheques to a relative of Sasikala who had quoted Jayalalithaa's residence as her own. She had filed an anticipatory bail in the trial court earlier, which was rejected on 7 December 1996. Around 2,500 party men gathered around her residence to block her arrest despite the cordon set by the Tamil Nadu Police.

On 14 May 1998, a special court framed charges against the eleven accused in the case, namely the following: Jayalalithaa, her aide Sasikala, the Rural Affairs minister Selvaganapathy, the Chief Secretary N. Haribaskar, the state Rural Development Secretary H. M. Pandey, the former Rural Development Director M. Satyamurthy, PA Jarnathanan, and the minister's secretary and contractors, Doraisamy and Muthukumarasamy. The judge, Radhakrishnan, noted that there was enough evidence to frame the charges and dismissed the petition filed by Jayalalithaa and seven others to acquit them from the case. The Criminal Intelligence Division (CID) of Tamil Nadu, which handled the case, argued that the purchase of 45,302 colour television sets for Panchayat community centres across the state during the regime of Jayalalithaa was corrupt. The judge framed charges under Indian Penal Code (IPC) sections 120(b) of the Prevention of Corruption Act and sections 109 and 409. The chargesheet quoted that the television sets were priced ₹14,500 (US$298) against a market price of ₹12,000 (US$247), creating a loss to the state exchequer. Baskaran, a relative of Sasikala, was later included in the case.

== Trial ==
The trial of the case began in a special court on 28 December 1998. Around 80 witnesses from the prosecution side and two from the defence side were examined. The special court convicted seven of the nine accused of criminal conspiracy on 30 May 2000, under section 120-B of the Indian Penal Code and sentenced them to five years of rigorous imprisonment and a fine of ₹10,000 (US$200). The seven convicts were then-Rural Affairs minister Selvaganapathy, the minister, Chief Secretary N Haribaskar, state Rural Development Secretary H M Pandey, former Rural Development Director M Satyamurthy, PA Jarnathanan, the minister's PA, and two contractors, Doraisamy and Muthukumarasamy. The seven sentenced by the court were moved to Vellore Central Prison that same evening. Jayalalithaa, Sasikala, and Sasikala's relative Baskaran were acquitted, as the accusations against them were not proven beyond doubt. The judge stated in his verdict that "Ms. Jayalalithaa had no role in the conspiracy; even if it is presumed that there was violation of the financial code, it is not enough to show that she had participated in the conspiracy". Selvaganapathy, who was a member of Parliament at the time of the verdict, was banned from Parliament after the verdict.

The state government appealed the acquittal of Jayalalithaa. On 5 May 2000, the Supreme Court asked the High Court to give more time to Jayalalithaa to examine the defence witness, based on the Special Leave Petition filed by her in the Supreme Court. The appeal of the state government was quashed by the Madras High Court on 21 August 2009. The court also acquitted the five-year sentence of the seven convicted by the lower court.

== Political implications ==
This case was one of the first incidents where an ex-chief minister was arrested and sent to jail. It was also one of the earliest instances of the conviction of a member of Parliament in a corruption case, as Selvaganapathy was an MP in the Rajya Sabha at the time of the verdict. While Jayalalithaa was in jail for 30 days, her residence at Poes Gardens in Chennai was raided. Sun TV, a channel run by Karunanidhi's nephew, was allowed to videotape the raid, creating a huge controversy. The channel showed large amounts of jewellery and personal assets of Jayalalithaa, resulting in a wide political debate.

== Timeline ==
- 7 December 1996 – The court rejected anticipatory bail and Jayalalithaa arrested in the case and was sent to judicial custody.
- 14 May 1998 – Chargesheet filed against Jayalalithaa, Sasikala, the then Rural Affairs minister Selvaganapathy, the then Chief Secretary N Haribaskar, the then state Rural Development Secretary H M Pandey, the then former Rural Development Director M Satyamurthy, PA Jarnathanan, the then minister's secretary and contractors, Doraisamy and Muthukumarasamy.
- 28 December 1998 – The trial of the case started in the special court.
- 5 May 2000 – The Supreme Court asked the High Court to give Jayalalithaa more time to examine the defence witness.
- 29 May 2000 – Jayalalithaa and Sasikala were acquitted, and the other seven received five years of rigorous imprisonment and a fine of ₹10,000 (US$200).
- 21 August 2009 – The High Court upheld the order of the lower court acquitting Jayalalithaa, Sasikala and Baskaran, while also acquitting all others.
