= T. P. Arumugam =

Indian politician

T. P. Arumugam is an Indian politician and former Member of the Legislative Assembly of Tamil Nadu. He was elected to the Tamil Nadu legislative assembly as a Dravida Munnetra Kazhagam (DMK) candidate from Tiruchengode constituency in the 1996 election. He contested the seat again in 2001, when he came second to C. Ponnaiyan of the All India Anna Dravida Munnetra Kazhagam. He is founder of Sengunthar Engineering College
