= K. Marappa Gounder =

Indian politician

Member of the Tamil Nadu Legislative Assembly
- In office 1957–1967
- Succeeded by: R. K. Gounder
- Constituency: Avanashi

Personal details
- Party: Indian National Congress

K. Marappa Gounder was an Indian politician and former Member of the Legislative Assembly of Tamil Nadu. He was elected to the Tamil Nadu legislative assembly as an Indian National Congress candidate from Avanashi constituency in, 1957, and 1962 elections.

== Electoral performance ==
| Election | Constituency | Political party | Result | Vote % | Opposition | | | Ref |
| Election | Constituency | Political party | Result | Vote % | Candidate | Political party | Vote % | Ref |
|---|---|---|---|---|---|---|---|---|
| 1957 | Avanashi | INC | Won | 60.25% | Karuppa Gounder | Independent | 39.75% | |
| 1962 | Avanashi | INC | Won | 53.02% | M. Ponnusami | SWA | 23.94% | |
