= V. S. Matheswaran =

Indian Politician

Member of Parliament, Lok Sabha
- Incumbent
- Assumed office 4 June 2024
- Preceded by: A.K.P. Chinraj
- Constituency: Namakkal

Personal details
- Party: Kongunadu Makkal Desia Katchi
- Occupation: Politician

V. S. Matheswaran is an Indian politician and former minister ( 2006-10) . He is a member of DMK party. He has been elected to Lok Sabha from Namakkal Lok Sabha constituency.

== Electoral performance ==
2024 Indian general election : Namakkal
| Party | Candidate | Votes | % | ±% |
|---|---|---|---|---|
| KMDK | V. S. Matheswaran | 462,036 | 40.31 | ▼15.10 |
| AIADMK | S. Tamil Mani | 4,32,924 | 37.77 | ▲5.81 |
| BJP | K. P. Ramalingam | 1,04,690 | 9.13 | New |
| NTK | K. Kanimozhi | 95,577 | 8.34 | ▲4.93 |
| NOTA | None of the above | 12,984 | 1.13 | ▼0.20 |
| Margin of victory | | 29,112 | 2.54 | ▼20.93 |
| Turnout | | 11,46,303 | 78.21 | ▼2.01 |
| Registered electors | | 14,52,562 | | |
| KMDK hold | | Swing | | |

2016 Tamil Nadu Legislative Assembly election: Namakkal
| Party | Candidate | Votes | % | ±% |
|---|---|---|---|---|
| AIADMK | K. P. P. Baskar | 89,076 | 45.81% | −10.53 |
| INC | R. Chezhian | 75,542 | 38.85% | New |
| KMDK | V. S. Matheswaran | 10,506 | 5.40% | New |
| TMC(M) | N. Elango | 4,341 | 2.23% | New |
| NOTA | NOTA | 3,828 | 1.97% | New |
| BJP | V. Rajendran | 2,751 | 1.41% | +0.14 |
| PMK | E. Duraisamy | 2,751 | 1.41% | New |
| NTK | M. Loganathan | 2,729 | 1.40% | New |
| Independent | C. Murugan | 997 | 0.51% | New |
| Margin of victory | | 13,534 | 6.96% | −14.17% |
| Turnout | | 194,441 | 80.14% | −1.91% |
| Registered electors | | 242,615 | | |
| AIADMK hold | | Swing | -10.53% | |

== See also ==
- Namakkal
- List of constituencies of the Andhra Pradesh Legislative Assembly
