= Namakkal Lok Sabha constituency =

Parliamentary constituency in Tamil Nadu, India

Coordinates: 11°14′N 78°10′E

Namakkal
- Lok Sabha constituency
- Interactive map of Namakkal Loksabha constituency, post-2008 delimitation

Constituency details
- Country: India
- Region: South India
- State: Tamil Nadu
- Assembly constituencies: Sankari; Rasipuram; Senthamangalam; Namakkal; Paramathi-Velur; Tiruchengodu
- Established: 2009
- Total electors: 14,13,246
- Reservation: None

Member of Parliament
- 18th Lok Sabha
- Incumbent V. S. Matheswaran
- Party: DMK
- Alliance: None
- Elected year: 2024

Namakkal is a Lok Sabha Constituency in Tamil Nadu, India. Its Tamil Nadu Parliamentary Constituency number is 16 of 39. It was a part of Rasipuram (Lok Sabha constituency) in previous parliament Election. Namakkal Lok Sabha Constituency consists of Sankagiri, Rasipuram, Senthamangalam, Namakkal, Paramathi-Velur and Tiruchengodu assembly segments. Out of these 6 assembly segments Rasipuram is Reserved for SC candidates and Senthamangalam assembly segment is reserved for ST Candidates.

== History ==
Tiruchengode (Lok Sabha constituency) and Rasipuram (Lok Sabha constituency) were delimited in 2008 and the area became a part of the Namakkal (Lok Sabha constituency).

== Assembly segments ==
=== 2009–present ===
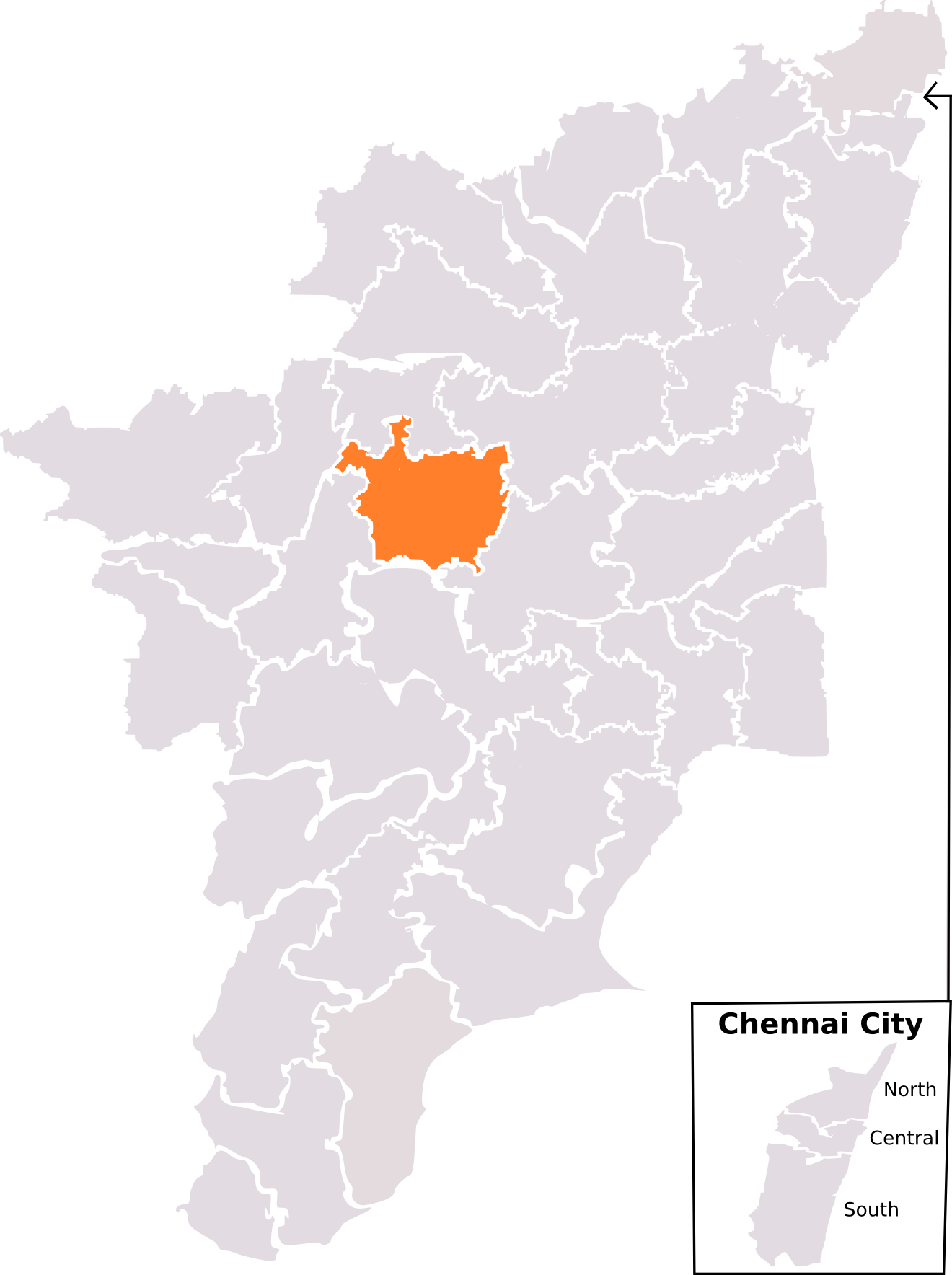
Namakkal constituency as laid out by 2008 Delimitation

Namakkal Lok Sabha constituency is composed of the following assembly segments:

Constituency number	Name	Reserved for (SC/ST/None)	District	Party	2024 Lead
87	Sankari	None	Salem	AIADMK	AIADMK
92	Rasipuram	SC	Namakkal	TVK	DMK
93	Senthamangalam	ST	Namakkal	TVK	DMK
94	Namakkal	None	Namakkal	TVK	DMK
95	Paramathi-Velur	None	Namakkal	AIADMK	AIADMK
96	Tiruchengodu	None	Namakkal	TVK	DMK

== Members of Parliament ==
Year	Member	Political party
1962	V. K. Ramasamy	Indian National Congress
Formed again after Delimitation of Constituency
2009	S. Gandhiselvan	Dravida Munnetra Kazhagam
2014	P. R. Sundaram	All India Anna Dravida Munnetra Kazhagam
2019	A. K. P. Chinraj (Note: Kongunadu Makkal Desia Katchi (KMDK) contested on the "Rising Sun" symbol of the Dravida Munnetra Kazhagam (DMK), and is officially recorded as a DMK candidate in electoral records.)	Dravida Munnetra Kazhagam
2024	V. S. Matheswaran	Dravida Munnetra Kazhagam

== Election results ==
Vote share of Winning candidates
2024	40.31%
2019	55.43%
2014	54.02%
2009	44.00%
1962	43.83%
1957	23.80%

=== General Elections 2024 ===
2024 Indian general election : Namakkal
Party	Candidate	Votes	%	±%
KMDK	V. S. Matheswaran	462,036	40.31	▼15.10
AIADMK	S. Tamil Mani	4,32,924	37.77	▲5.81
BJP	K. P. Ramalingam	1,04,690	9.13	New
NOTA	None of the above	12,984	1.13	▼0.20
Margin of victory		29,112	2.54	▼20.93
Turnout		11,46,303	78.21	▼2.01
Registered electors		14,52,562		
KMDK hold		Swing		

=== General Elections 2019 ===
2019 Indian general election : Namakkal
Party	Candidate	Votes	%	±%
KMDK	A. K. P. Chinraj	626,293	55.43	+29.64
AIADMK	P. Kaliappan	3,61,142	31.96	−22.06
MNM	R. Thangavelu	30,947	2.74	
Independent	P. P. Saminathan	23,347	2.07	
NOTA	None of the above	15,073	1.33	−0.20
Margin of victory		2,65,151	23.47	−4.76
Turnout		11,29,890	80.22	1.50
Registered electors		14,13,599		6.32
KMDK gain from AIADMK		Swing	1.41	

=== General Elections 2014 ===
2014 Indian general election : Namakkal
Party	Candidate	Votes	%	±%
AIADMK	P. R. Sundaram	563,272	54.02	22.15
DMK	S. Gandhiselvan	2,68,898	25.79	−18.21
DMDK	S. K. Vel	1,46,882	14.09	4.68
INC	G. R. Subramaniyan	19,800	1.90	
NOTA	None of the above	16,002	1.53	
TNMK	S. Velusamy	4,827	0.46	
Independent	S. M. Sivaji	4,808	0.46	
Margin of victory		2,94,374	28.23	16.10
Turnout		10,42,753	79.73	−0.07
Registered electors		13,29,552		23.62
AIADMK gain from DMK		Swing	10.02	

=== General Elections 2009 ===
2009 Indian general election : Namakkal
Party	Candidate	Votes	%	±%
DMK	S. Gandhiselvan	371,476	44.00	
AIADMK	V. Vairam Tamilarasi	2,69,045	31.87	
DMDK	N. Maheswaran	79,420	9.41	
KNMK	R. Devarasan	52,433	6.21	
Independent	U. Thaniyarasu	24,230	2.87	
BJP	K. Suresh Gandhi	7,939	0.94	
Ulzaipali Makkal Katchy	V. Lingappan	6,907	0.82	
Margin of victory		1,02,431	12.13	
Turnout		8,44,223	78.69	
Registered electors		10,75,526		
DMK win (new seat)				

Note: After the 1967 Delimitation order, the constituency was abolished. It was reestablished after the passing of the 2008 Delimitation order.

=== General Elections 1962 ===
1962 Indian general election : Namakkal
Party	Candidate	Votes	%	±%
INC	V. K. Ramaswamy	118,603	43.83	22.36
DMK	M. P. Vadivelu	1,09,652	40.52	
TNP	S. Palanimuthu	28,621	10.58	
Independent	Seerangan	13,722	5.07	
Margin of victory		8,951	3.31	0.98
Turnout		2,70,598	67.94	−23.50
Registered electors		4,08,580		−51.16
INC gain from Independent		Swing	20.03	

=== General Elections 1957 ===
1957 Indian general election : Namakkal
Party	Candidate	Votes	%	±%
Independent	E. V. K. Sampath	182,066	23.80	
INC	S. R. Arumugam	1,64,221	21.47	
INC	T. A. M. Subramania Chettiar	1,55,531	20.33	
Independent	Sundararajan	1,50,673	19.70	
Independent	Kesavlal Kalidass Sait	70,673	9.24	
Independent	Paramasiva Gounder	41,848	5.47	
Margin of victory		17,845	2.33	
Turnout		7,65,012	91.44	
Registered electors		8,36,631		
Independent win (new seat)				
