= R. Prema =

Indian politician

Member of the Tamil Nadu Legislative Assembly
- In office 2006–2011
- Preceded by: S. Mahalingam
- Succeeded by: A. A. Karuppasamy
- Constituency: Avanashi

Personal details
- Party: All India Anna Dravida Munnetra Kazhagam

R. Prema was elected to the Tamil Nadu Legislative Assembly from the Avinashi constituency in the 2006 election. He was a candidate of the All India Anna Dravida Munnetra Kazhagam (AIADMK) party.

== Electoral performance ==
Election	Constituency	Political party	Result	Vote %	Opposition			Ref
Election	Constituency	Political party	Result	Vote %	Candidate	Political party	Vote %	Ref
2006	Avanashi	AIADMK	Won	40.57%	M. Arumugam	CPI	37.20%	
