= Kumarapalayam Assembly constituency =

State Legislative Assembly Constituency in Tamil Nadu

Coordinates: 11.44°N 77.72°E

Kumarapalayam
- Constituency No. 97 for the Tamil Nadu Legislative Assembly

Constituency details
- Country: India
- Region: South India
- State: Tamil Nadu
- District: Namakkal
- Lok Sabha constituency: Erode
- Established: 2008
- Total electors: 2,20,072
- Reservation: None

Member of Legislative Assembly
- 17th Tamil Nadu Legislative Assembly
- Incumbent C. Vijayalakshmi
- Party: TVK
- Alliance: TVK+
- Elected year: 2026

Kumarapalayam is a state assembly constituency in Namakkal district of Tamil Nadu. Its State Assembly Constituency number is 97. It consists of a portion of Kumarapalayam taluk. It is included in Erode Lok Sabha constituency. It is one of the 234 State Legislative Assembly Constituencies in Tamil Nadu.

It was newly formed in the year 2008 by separating Sankari and Tiruchengode constituencies.

It covers Kumarapalayam Municipality and the majority of Pallipalayam Block. It covers until Bhavani Assembly constituency in the north and Erode East Assembly constituency with the river Kaveri as its boundary.

== Members of the Legislative Assembly ==
Year	Member	Party
2011	P. Thangamani	All India Anna Dravida Munnetra Kazhagam
2016	P. Thangamani	All India Anna Dravida Munnetra Kazhagam
2021	P. Thangamani	All India Anna Dravida Munnetra Kazhagam
2026	C. Vijayalakshmi	Tamilaga Vettri Kazhagam

== Election results ==
Vote share of winning candidates
2026	39.54%
2021	49.92%
2016	55.20%
2011	56.59%

=== 2026 ===
2026 Tamil Nadu Legislative Assembly election: Kumarapalayam
Party	Candidate	Votes	%	±%
TVK	C. Vijayalakshmi	81,179	39.54	New
AIADMK	P. Thangamani	73,483	35.79	▼14.13
DMK	S. Balu	39,993	19.48	▼14.77
NTK	Uvarani Suresh	7,663	3.73	▼2.83
NOTA	NOTA	665	0.32	▼0.34
Margin of victory		7,696	3.75	▼11.92
Turnout		2,05,324	93.30	▲13.94
Registered electors		2,20,072		▼34,367
TVK gain from AIADMK		Swing	▲39.54	

=== 2021 ===
2021 Tamil Nadu Legislative Assembly election: Kumarapalayam
Party	Candidate	Votes	%	±%
AIADMK	P. Thangamani	100,800	49.92	▼5.28
DMK	M. Venkatachalam	69,154	34.25	▲4.40
NTK	S. Varun	13,240	6.56	▲5.00
Independent	S. Ommsharravana	7,342	3.64	New
MNM	K. Kamaraj	6,125	3.03	New
NOTA	NOTA	1,342	0.66	▼0.94
DMDK	K. R. Sivasubiramaniyan	1,022	0.51	▼4.74
Margin of victory		31,646	15.67	−9.68
Turnout		201,925	79.36	−1.44
Rejected ballots		87	0.04	
Registered electors		254,439		
AIADMK hold		Swing	-5.28	

=== 2016 ===
2016 Tamil Nadu Legislative Assembly election: Kumarapalayam
Party	Candidate	Votes	%	±%
AIADMK	P. Thangamani	103,032	55.20	▼1.39
DMK	P. Yuvaraj	55,703	29.84	▼10.04
DMDK	P. A. Madeshwaran	9,784	5.24	New
NOTA	None Of The Above	2,994	1.60	New
NTK	G. Arunkumar	2,908	1.56	New
KMDK	R. Ponnusamy	2,813	1.51	New
PMK	S. Murthy	2,773	1.49	New
BJP	K. Easwaran	1,981	1.06	▲0.07
Margin of victory		47,329	25.36	8.65
Turnout		186,652	80.80	−5.53
Registered electors		231,009		
AIADMK hold		Swing	-1.39	

=== 2011 ===
2011 Tamil Nadu Legislative Assembly election: Kumarapalayam
Party	Candidate	Votes	%	±%
AIADMK	P. Thangamani	91,077	56.59	New
DMK	G. Selvaraju	64,190	39.88	New
BJP	K. S. Balamurugan	1,600	0.99	New
Independent	S. Thangamani	1,179	0.73	New
Independent	K. Venugopal	1,126	0.70	New
Margin of victory		26,887	16.70	
Turnout		186,437	86.33	
Registered electors		160,955		
AIADMK win (new seat)				
