= R. Kandaswami =

Indian politician

R. Kandaswami was an Indian politician and former Member of the Legislative Assembly of Tamil Nadu. He was elected to the Tamil Nadu Legislative Assembly as an Indian National Congress candidate from Tiruchengode constituency in 1957 election. He was one of the two winners, the other being T. M. Kaliannan from the same party.
