= Tiruchengode Assembly constituency =

State Legislative Assembly Constituency in Tamil Nadu

Coordinates: 11.38°N 77.89°E

Tiruchengode
- Constituency No. 96 for the Tamil Nadu Legislative Assembly

Constituency details
- Country: India
- Region: South India
- State: Tamil Nadu
- District: Namakkal
- Lok Sabha constituency: Namakkal
- Established: 1951
- Total electors: 2,09,099
- Reservation: None

Member of Legislative Assembly
- 17th Tamil Nadu Legislative Assembly
- Incumbent K. G. Arunraj
- Party: Tamilaga Vettri Kazhagam
- Elected year: 2026

Tiruchengode or 'Tiruchengodu' is a state assembly constituency in Namakkal district in Tamil Nadu. Its State Assembly Constituency number is 96. It consists of a portion of Tiruchengodu taluk. It falls under Namakkal Lok Sabha constituency. It is one of the 234 State Legislative Assembly Constituencies in Tamil Nadu, in India.

== Members of Legislative Assembly ==
=== Madras State ===
Year	Winner	Party
1952	S. Arumugam and T. S. Arthanari	Independent and Communist Party of India
1957	R. Kandaswami and T. M. Kaliannan	Indian National Congress
1962	T. M. Kaliannan	Indian National Congress
1967	T. A. Rajavelu	Dravida Munnetra Kazhagam

=== Tamil Nadu ===
Year	Winner	Party
1971	S. Kandappan	Dravida Munnetra Kazhagam
1977	C. Ponnaiyan	All India Anna Dravida Munnetra Kazhagam
1980	C. Ponnaiyan	All India Anna Dravida Munnetra Kazhagam
1984	P Palanisamy	All India Anna Dravida Munnetra Kazhagam
1989	V. Ramasamy	Communist Party of India (Marxist)
1991	T. M. Selvaganapathy	All India Anna Dravida Munnetra Kazhagam
1996	T. P. Arumugom	Dravida Munnetra Kazhagam
2001	C. Ponnaiyan	All India Anna Dravida Munnetra Kazhagam
2006	P. Thangamani	All India Anna Dravida Munnetra Kazhagam
2011	P. Sampath Kumar	Desiya Murpokku Dravida Kazhagam
2016	Pon. Saraswathi	All India Anna Dravida Munnetra Kazhagam
2021	E. R. Eswaran	Kongunadu Makkal Desia Katchi
2026	Arunraj K.G.	Tamilaga Vettri Kazhagam

== Election results ==
Vote share of winning candidates
2026	41.6%
2021	44.60%
2016	41.40%
2011	52.12%
2006	40.30%
2001	59.55%
1996	58.10%
1991	74.10%
1989	34.91%
1984	55.38%
1980	55.34%
1977	46.11%
1971	60.89%
1967	64.73%
1962	48.64%
1957	31.11%
1952	27.11%

=== 2026 ===
2026 Tamil Nadu Legislative Assembly election: Tiruchengode
Party	Candidate	Votes	%	±%
TVK	Arunraj K.G.	79,500	41.60	New
AIADMK	SRMT Sekar (a) Chandrasekar R	51,328	26.86	▼16.18
KMDK (DMK)	E. R. Eswaran	49,465	25.88	▼18.72
NTK	Revathi K	6,085	3.18	▼4.45
Independent	Saravanasundaram S	1,190	0.62	New
NOTA	NOTA	520	0.27	▼0.56
Margin of victory		28,172	14.74	▲13.18
Turnout		1,91,122	91.40	▲12.15
Registered electors		2,09,099		▼22,001
TVK gain from KMDK		Swing	▲41.60	

=== 2021 ===
2021 Tamil Nadu Legislative Assembly election: Tiruchengode
Party	Candidate	Votes	%	±%
KMDK	E. R. Eswaran	81,688	44.60	+5.12
AIADMK	Pon. Saraswathi	78,826	43.04	+1.64
NTK	P. Natarajan	13,967	7.63	+6.51
MNM	R. Janagaraj	3,724	2.03	New
NOTA	NOTA	1,518	0.83	−0.46
Margin of victory		2,862	1.56	−0.36
Turnout		183,151	79.25	−2.22
Rejected ballots		209	0.11	
Registered electors		231,100		
KMDK gain from AIADMK		Swing	3.20	

=== 2016 ===
2016 Tamil Nadu Legislative Assembly election: Tiruchengode
Party	Candidate	Votes	%	±%
AIADMK	Pon. Saraswathi	73,103	41.40	New
DMK	Bar. Elangoavan	69,713	39.48	New
DMDK	J. Vijayakamal	6,688	3.79	−48.33
KMDK	S. Rajavel Nathi	6,471	3.66	New
Independent	P. Muthumani	5,923	3.35	New
BJP	S. Nagarajan	2,499	1.42	−0.33
NOTA	NOTA	2,279	1.29	New
PMK	S. Raja	2,012	1.14	New
NTK	P. Natarajan	1,968	1.11	New
Independent	S. Saraswathi	1,345	0.76	New
Margin of victory		3,390	1.92	−14.06
Turnout		176,564	81.47	−0.56
Registered electors		216,720		
AIADMK gain from DMDK		Swing	-10.72	

=== 2011 ===
2011 Tamil Nadu Legislative Assembly election: Tiruchengode
Party	Candidate	Votes	%	±%
DMDK	P. Sampath Kumar	78,103	52.12	+36.88
INC	M. R. Sundaram	54,158	36.14	New
Independent	S. Selvaraj	3,809	2.54	New
Independent	S. Senthilkumar	3,311	2.21	New
Independent	R. Tamilarasu	2,776	1.85	New
BJP	S. Nagarajan	2,609	1.74	+0.64
Independent	K. Appavu	1,401	0.93	New
BSP	K. Gnanavel	1,227	0.82	New
Independent	G. Sampathkumar	771	0.51	New
Margin of victory		23,945	15.98	15.93
Turnout		149,845	82.03	10.54
Registered electors		182,669		
DMDK gain from AIADMK		Swing	11.82	

=== 2006 ===
2006 Tamil Nadu Legislative Assembly election: Tiruchengode
Party	Candidate	Votes	%	±%
AIADMK	P. Thangamani	85,471	40.30	−19.24
DMK	S. Gandhiselvan	85,355	40.25	+5.05
DMDK	S. Pongiyannan	32,327	15.24	New
Independent	V. Lingappan	2,969	1.40	New
BJP	P. T. Dhanagopal	2,332	1.10	New
Margin of victory		116	0.05	−24.29
Turnout		212,068	71.50	12.15
Registered electors		296,618		
AIADMK hold		Swing	-19.24	

=== 2001 ===
2001 Tamil Nadu Legislative Assembly election: Tiruchengode
Party	Candidate	Votes	%	±%
AIADMK	C. Ponnaiyan	107,898	59.55	+27.12
DMK	T. P. Arumugam	63,789	35.20	−22.9
MDMK	T. P. Gurusamy	3,687	2.03	New
JD(S)	S. K. Arumugam	1,559	0.86	New
Independent	R. Varadharajan	1,431	0.79	New
Independent	C. Perumal	1,025	0.57	New
Margin of victory		44,109	24.34	−1.33
Turnout		181,200	59.35	−3.24
Registered electors		305,346		
AIADMK gain from DMK		Swing	1.44	

=== 1996 ===
1996 Tamil Nadu Legislative Assembly election: Tiruchengode
Party	Candidate	Votes	%	±%
DMK	T. P. Arumugam	96,456	58.10	New
AIADMK	S. Chinnusamy	53,836	32.43	−41.68
CPI(M)	A. Athi Narayanan	9,816	5.91	−16.86
Margin of victory		42,620	25.67	−25.66
Turnout		166,010	62.59	2.11
Registered electors		275,045		
DMK gain from AIADMK		Swing	-16.00	

=== 1991 ===
1991 Tamil Nadu Legislative Assembly election: Tiruchengode
Party	Candidate	Votes	%	±%
AIADMK	T. M. Selvaganapathy	113,545	74.10	+51.03
CPI(M)	V. Ramasamy	34,886	22.77	−12.14
PMK	C. Palanisamy	1,419	0.93	New
Margin of victory		78,659	51.34	39.50
Turnout		153,222	60.48	−6.50
Registered electors		260,517		
AIADMK gain from CPI(M)		Swing	39.19	

=== 1989 ===
1989 Tamil Nadu Legislative Assembly election: Tiruchengode
Party	Candidate	Votes	%	±%
CPI(M)	V. Ramasamy	53,346	34.91	New
AIADMK	R. Rajan	35,258	23.08	−32.3
AIADMK	P. Duraisamy	30,320	19.84	−35.54
INC	P. Palanisamy	20,052	13.12	New
Independent	P. Kannan	5,409	3.54	New
Independent	R. Chandrasekaran	2,757	1.80	New
Independent	A. Sundaram	911	0.60	New
Margin of victory		18,088	11.84	−1.87
Turnout		152,797	66.98	−3.91
Registered electors		232,631		
CPI(M) gain from AIADMK		Swing	-20.47	

=== 1984 ===
1984 Tamil Nadu Legislative Assembly election: Tiruchengode
Party	Candidate	Votes	%	±%
AIADMK	C. Ponnaiyan	77,659	55.38	+0.04
DMK	M. M. Kandasamy	58,437	41.67	New
Margin of victory		19,222	13.71	0.04
Turnout		140,232	70.88	3.68
Registered electors		206,470		
AIADMK hold		Swing	0.04	

=== 1980 ===
1980 Tamil Nadu Legislative Assembly election: Tiruchengode
Party	Candidate	Votes	%	±%
AIADMK	C. Ponnaiyan	69,122	55.34	+9.23
INC	T M. Kaliyannan	52,046	41.67	+24.91
Independent	A. Palanivel	1,193	0.96	New
Independent	N. Subramaniyan	968	0.77	New
Independent	T. K. Ganesan	866	0.69	New
Independent	A. Subramani	709	0.57	New
Margin of victory		17,076	13.67	−14.03
Turnout		124,904	67.20	7.55
Registered electors		188,698		
AIADMK hold		Swing	9.23	

=== 1977 ===
1977 Tamil Nadu Legislative Assembly election: Tiruchengode
Party	Candidate	Votes	%	±%
AIADMK	C. Ponnaiyan	44,501	46.11	New
JP	V. Kumaraswamy	17,764	18.41	New
INC	T. M. Kaliannan	16,177	16.76	−17.24
DMK	T. K. Shanmugam	14,433	14.95	−45.94
Independent	R. Samy	1,223	1.27	New
Independent	N. Subramaniam	1,145	1.19	New
Independent	T. Sankaran Pillai	665	0.69	New
Independent	S. Ramasamy Naicker	605	0.63	New
Margin of victory		26,737	27.70	0.81
Turnout		96,513	59.65	−2.77
Registered electors		164,330		
AIADMK gain from DMK		Swing	-14.78	

=== 1971 ===
1971 Tamil Nadu Legislative Assembly election: Tiruchengode
Party	Candidate	Votes	%	±%
DMK	S. Kandappan	43,605	60.89	−3.84
INC	V. Kumarasamy	24,345	34.00	+0.27
Independent	T. Sankaran Pillai	3,660	5.11	New
Margin of victory		19,260	26.90	−4.11
Turnout		71,610	62.42	−6.14
Registered electors		118,522		
DMK hold		Swing	-3.84	

=== 1967 ===
1967 Madras Legislative Assembly election: Tiruchengode
Party	Candidate	Votes	%	±%
DMK	T. A. Rajavelu	42,479	64.73	+23.18
INC	T. P. Natesan	22,131	33.72	−14.91
Independent	R. Rajan	1,012	1.54	New
Margin of victory		20,348	31.01	23.92
Turnout		65,622	68.56	12.50
Registered electors		99,100		
DMK gain from INC		Swing	16.09	

=== 1962 ===
1962 Madras Legislative Assembly election: Tiruchengode
Party	Candidate	Votes	%	±%
INC	T. M. Kaliannan	24,640	48.64	+17.53
DMK	T. A. Rajavelu	21,050	41.55	New
Independent	K. K. Muniappa Gounder	3,406	6.72	New
We Tamils	C. Govindan	1,562	3.08	New
Margin of victory		3,590	7.09	3.53
Turnout		50,658	56.06	−8.02
Registered electors		93,625		
INC hold		Swing	17.53	

=== 1957 ===
1957 Madras Legislative Assembly election: Tiruchengode
Party	Candidate	Votes	%	±%
INC	T. M. Kaliannan	33,360	31.11	+8.42
INC	R. Kandasami	29,546	27.55	+4.86
Independent	Rangasami Gounder	9,383	8.75	New
PSP	Komaran (Sc)	7,625	7.11	New
Independent	Muthusami (Sc)	6,610	6.16	New
Independent	Dhanakoti	4,897	4.57	New
Independent	S. Arumugam Pillai (Sc)	3,319	3.09	New
Independent	K. C. Marappa Gounder	3,211	2.99	New
PSP	Mariappa Mudali	3,131	2.92	New
Independent	K. N. Natarajan	2,104	1.96	New
Independent	Muthu Naicker	1,500	1.40	New
Margin of victory		3,814	3.56	3.37
Turnout		107,246	64.08	−13.41
Registered electors		167,353		
INC gain from Independent		Swing	4.00	

=== 1952 ===
1952 Madras Legislative Assembly election: Tiruchengode
Party	Candidate	Votes	%	±%
Independent	S. Arumugham	29,007	27.11	New
CPI	T. S. Arthanari	28,807	26.92	New
INC	Radhabai Subbarayan	24,279	22.69	New
INC	V. K. Ramaswamy	20,546	19.20	New
RPI	S. Sengottvel	4,365	4.08	New
Margin of victory		200	0.19	
Turnout		107,004	77.49	
Registered electors		138,081		
Independent win (new seat)				
