= A. A. Karuppasamy =

Indian politician

Member of the Tamil Nadu Legislative Assembly
- In office 2011–2016
- Preceded by: R. Prema
- Succeeded by: P. Dhanapal
- Constituency: Avanashi

Personal details
- Party: All India Anna Dravida Munnetra Kazhagam

A. A. Karuppasamy (born 1 July 1964) is an Indian politician and was a member of the 14th Tamil Nadu Legislative Assembly from the Avinashi constituency, which is reserved for candidates from the Scheduled Castes. He represented the All India Anna Dravida Munnetra Kazhagam party.

Karuppasamy was born on 1 July 1964 in Alathur. He is married and has three children.

== Electoral performance ==
| Election | Constituency | Political party | Result | Vote % | Opposition | | | Ref |
| Election | Constituency | Political party | Result | Vote % | Candidate | Political party | Vote % | Ref |
|---|---|---|---|---|---|---|---|---|
| 2011 | Avanashi | AIADMK | Won | 66.60% | A. R. Natarajan | INC | 26.89% | |
