= Kongu Vellala Goundergal Peravai =

- KVGP FLAG
- Type: Caste association
- Headquarters: Coimbatore, Tamil Nadu, India
- Official language: Tamil

Kongu Vellala Goundergal Peravai is a caste organization in the Indian state of Tamil Nadu. It exists for the Kongu Vellalar Gounder or Vellala Gounder community.

== Origins and platform ==
The organization was founded in 1988 at Chennai. In 2009 it launched its own political party, the Kongunadu Munnetra Kazhagam (also referred to as the Kongunadu Munnetra Peravai). The organization is known for its strong stance against inter-caste hypogamy.

== Kongu Nadu Statehood movement ==
The Kongu Vellala Goundergal Peravaipassed a resolution in favor of formation of Kongu Nadu state by bifurcating Tamil Nadu.
