= A. K. P. Chinraj =

Indian politician

Member of Parliament, Lok Sabha
- In office 23 May 2019 – 5 June 2024
- Preceded by: P. R. Sundaram
- Succeeded by: V. S. Matheswaran
- Constituency: Namakkal

President of Tamil Nadu Poultry Farmers’ Association
- Incumbent
- Assumed office 2011

Personal details
- Born: June 1, 1965 (age 61) Namakkal
- Party: Kongunadu Makkal Desia Katchi
- Spouse: C. Shanthi
- Parent: K. Palaniappan Gounder (father)
- Profession: Business, agriculture, politician
- Website: akpchinraj.com

A. K. Palaniappan Chinraj (Tamil: ஏ. கே. பி. சின்ராஜ்) is an Indian politician. He was elected to the Lok Sabha, lower house of the Parliament of India from Namakkal, Tamil Nadu in the 2019 Indian general election.

== Education ==
He received his bachelor's degree in chemistry from Jamal Mohamed College in 1987.

== 2019 Loksabha ==
He contested the 2019 Loksabha election from Namakkal constituency under the Rising Sun symbol as part of the Secular Progressive Alliance and won with margin of 2,65,151 votes against ADMK candidate P. Kaliappan.
