= R. Santhi =

Indian politician

R. Santhi is an Indian politician and incumbent Member of the Tamil Nadu Legislative Assembly from the Senthamangalam constituency. She represents the Desiya Murpokku Dravidar Kazhagam party.
