= G. Elango =

Indian politician

G. Elango was elected to the Tamil Nadu Legislative Assembly from the Avanashi constituency, which is reserved for candidates from the Scheduled Castes, in the 1996 elections. He was a candidate of the Dravida Munnetra Kazhagam party.
