= T. S. Arthanari =

Indian politician

T. S. Arthanari was an Indian politician and former Member of the Legislative Assembly of Tamil Nadu. He was elected to the Tamil Nadu legislative assembly as a Communist Party of India candidate from Tiruchengode constituency in 1952 election.
