= P. Sampath Kumar =

Indian politician

P. Sampath Kumar is an Indian politician and former member of the Tamil Nadu Legislative Assembly from the Tiruchengode constituency. He represented the Desiya Murpokku Dravida Kazhagam party.
