= V. Ramasamy =

Indian politician

V. Ramasamy is an Indian politician and former Member of the Legislative Assembly of Tamil Nadu. He was elected to the Tamil Nadu legislative assembly as a Communist Party of India (Marxist) candidate from Tiruchengode constituency in 1989 election.
