= T. A. Rajavelu =

Indian politician

T. A. Rajavelu was an Indian politician and former Member of the Legislative Assembly of Tamil Nadu. He was elected to the Tamil Nadu legislative assembly as a Dravida Munnetra Kazhagam candidate from Tiruchengode constituency in the 1967 election.
