= S. Gandhiselvan =

Indian politician

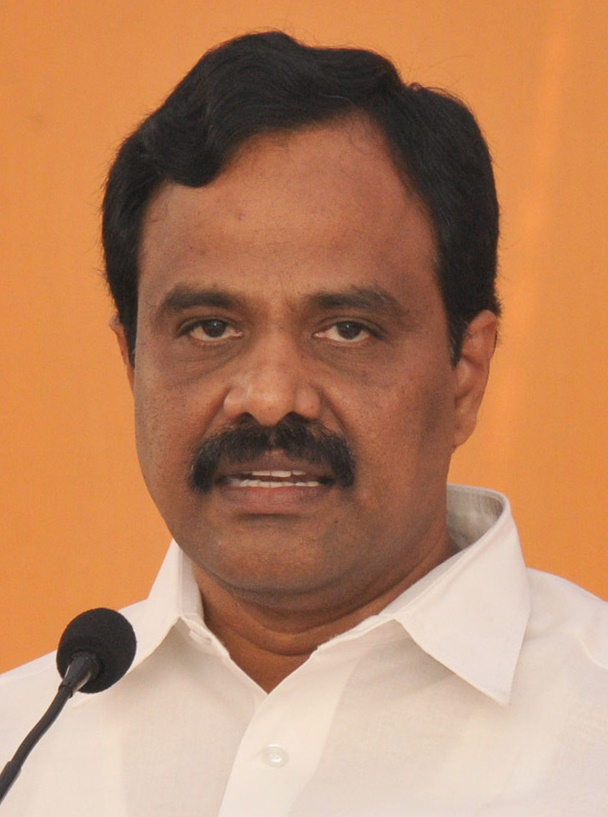
- Gandhiselvan in 2012

Union Minister of State for Health and Family Welfare
- In office 28 May 2009 – 20 March 2013 Serving with Dinesh Trivedi (until 2011); Sudip Bandyopadhyay (2011–2012), Abu Hasem Khan Choudhury (from 2012)
- Prime Minister: Manmohan Singh
- Minister: Ghulam Nabi Azad

Member of Parliament, Lok Sabha for Namakkal
- In office 16 May 2009 – 16 May 2014
- Preceded by: Constituency established
- Succeeded by: P. R. Sundaram

Personal details
- Born: 2 June 1963 (age 63) Namakkal, Tamil Nadu
- Party: Dravida Munnetra Kazhagam
- Spouse: Vasanthi G. (m.1993)
- Education: Annamalai University (M.A., M.Phil)

S. Gandhiselvan (born 2 June 1963) is an Indian politician and former member of the Parliament of India from Namakkal Constituency. He was the Minister of state for Health and Family Welfare, Govt. of India, from 22 May 2009 to 19 March 2013. He represents the Dravida Munnetra Kazhagam party
