= K. P. Ramaswamy =

Indian politician

K. P. Ramaswamy was elected to the Tamil Nadu Legislative Assembly from the Rasipuram constituency in the 2006 elections. He was a candidate of the Dravida Munnetra Kazhagam (DMK) party.
