= V. P. Duraisamy =

Indian politician

Vice President of TN BJP
- Incumbent
- Assumed office From May 2020

Deputy General Secretary of Dravida Munnetra Kazhagam
- In office Till (21 May 2020)

Deputy Speaker of Tamil Nadu Legislative Assembly
- In office 19 May 2006 – 14 May 2011
- In office 8 February 1989 – 30 January 1991

Member of parliament in Rajya Sabha
- In office 25/07/1995–10/10/1996
- In office 26/11/1996–24/07/2001

Personal details
- Party: Bharatiya Janata Party
- Other political affiliations: Dravida Munnetra Kazhagam (until 2020)
- Occupation: Politician

V. Perumal Duraisamy is an Indian politician of the Bharatiya Janata Party and a former member of the Tamil Nadu Legislative Assembly.

== Political career ==
He served as the Deputy Speaker of the Tamil Nadu Legislative Assembly from 1989 to 1991 and 2006 to 2011. He was a member of the Rajya Sabha from 1995 to 2001 and also chairman of many legislature committees. He was expelled from the post of Deputy general secretary of DMK on 21 May 2020, following which he joined BJP.

== Personal life ==
Duraisamy is born to a Dalit family to Perumal.
