= C. Ponnaiyan =

Indian politician

Vice Chairman of Tamil Nadu State Development Policy Council
- In office 2020–2021

Minister for Finance, Law, Information Technology and Food
- In office 2001–2006
- Chief Minister: J.Jayalalithaa; O. Panneerselvam; J.Jayalalithaa

Minister for Education
- In office 1986 - 1988
- Chief Minister: M.G.Ramachandran

Minister for Law, Courts & Prisons
- In office 1984 - 1988
- Chief Minister: M.G.Ramachandran

Minister for Co-operation
- In office 1980 - 1984
- Chief Minister: M.G.Ramachandran

Minister for Transport, Highways and Minor Ports
- In office 1977 - 1980
- Chief Minister: M.G.Ramachandran

Member of Legislative Assembly
- In office 1977-1987; 2001-2006
- Constituency: Tiruchengode constituency

6th Presidium Chairman of AIADMK
- In office 24 May 2003 – 3 February 2006
- General Secretary: J. Jayalalithaa
- Preceded by: Pulamaipithan
- Succeeded by: K. Kalimuthu

Personal details
- Born: 1942 (age 83–84) Tiruchengode
- Party: ADMK(1972-Present); DMK(1957-1972)

Chinnakutty Ponnaiyan is an Indian politician. He is one of the founding members of the Anna Dravida Munnetra Kazhagam party. He is the former member of the Tamil Nadu legislative assembly from Tiruchengode constituency in 1977, 1980, 1984 and 2001. He served as the Presidium Chairman of AIADMK from 2003 to 2006.

He started his career as a lawyer. Attracted by the ideologies of Arignar Anna and Thanthai Periyar, he took to public life at an early age. He has served as Minister of Finance, Education, Industry, Agriculture, Cooperation, Highways, Transport, Law and IT. He was a close confidant of Former Chief Minister of Tamil Nadu Dr. M.G. Ramachandran and served as Minister of Finance under Former Chief Minister Dr. J. Jayalalithaa.

== Early life ==
C. Ponnaiyan was born to Shri. Chinnakutty Gounder and Smt. Nallamal in 1942. Hailing from an agrarian family in Tiruchengodu, he completed his schooling in Tirunchengodu where he was influenced by his teachers Kuppusamy, Shanmugam and Natesan to the tenets of C.N. Annadurai known as Anna). Later he went to complete his bachelor's degree in Commerce and Law subsequently practising as a Lawyer in the Madras High Court.

== Political career ==
During his school days, Ponnaiyan was an active student and also the student secretary. He was inspired by the Dravidian ideologies and inculcated a spirit of commitment to society and the scuase of Tamil by Arignar Anna whom he regarded as a role model. This fervor took the mantle when he invited C.N. Annadurai to his school as chief guest. MGR's Nadodi Mannan film which poignantly embodied the doctrines of Anna fueled the ignited mind of the teenager who had a tormented ambition to commit himself to public life and made him join the DMK in 1957.

He practised law as Junior under Mr Mohan Kumaramangalam Mr. Raghavachari. He took part in the anti Hindi agitation alongside stalwarts C.N.Annadurai, M.G.Ramachandran, Nedunchezhian, K. A. Mathiazhagan, as it subdued the interests of Tamil Nadu. He later went to become the personal Lawyer of M.G.Ramachandran and was one of the founding members of Anna Dravida Munnetra Kazhagam in 1972. He was one of the trusted loyalists of M.G.Ramachandran, RM.Veerappan and S.D.Somasasundaram.

C Ponnaiyan in June 2022, accused the BJP-led Central government of stealing Tamil Nadu's's revenue, as well as blaming AIADMK for election losses, loss of minority community support, and "anti-Tamil" policies, particularly those affecting students.

== Cabinet minister ==
When Anna Dravida Munnetra Kazhagam came to power in 1977, he was inducted as a Minister in the cabinet of Chief Minister M.G.Ramachandran. He held several portfolios including that of Transport, Highways, Law, Cooperation, Education, Industry, Agriculture and Sports. During his tenure as Transport Minister, public transport was extended to remote villages and Tamil Nadu Government was duly awarded by the Government of India. As an Education Minister, he promoted engineering education in Tamil Nadu. He also served as a Minister of Finance, Law, IT and Food from 2001 to 2006 in the Cabinet of Smt J.Jayalalithaa, Former Chief Minister of Tamil Nadu. He was a member of Legislative Assembly of Tamil Nadu elected from Tiruchengode constituency in 1977, 1980, 1984 and 2001.

== Personal life ==
He is married to Dr. Sarojaa Sengunthar, a Gynecologist and obstetrician by profession and the couple have two sons.

== In popular culture ==
Ponnaiyan is mentioned by name in the film Kana Kandaen (2005).
