= Kongunadu Makkal Desia Katchi =

Kongunadu Makkal Desiya Katchi
- General Secretary: E. R. Eswaran
- Founded: 21 March 2013 (13 years ago)
- Headquarters: Administrative Office, Door no. 46, Sampath Nagar, Erode
- Alliance: NDA (2014–2016); UPA (2011, 2019–2023); INDIA (2023–present); SPA (2019–present)
- Seats in Rajya Sabha: 0 / 245
- Seats in Lok Sabha: 0 / 543
- Seats in Tamil Nadu Legislative Assembly: 0 / 234
- Number of states and union territories in government: 0 / 31

Party flag
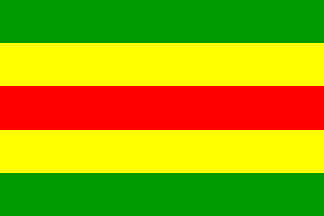

Website
- www.kmdk.in

Kongunadu Makkal Desiya Katchi (KMDK) is a political party in the Indian state of Tamil Nadu. The party's vote base is mainly concentrated in western districts of Tamil Nadu. It was a splinter party of Kongunadu Munnetra Kazhagam (KMK) The party currently has one Member of Parliament from Namakkal, V. S. Matheswaran. It also has one member in Tamil Nadu Legislative assembly, held by E. R. Eswaran. The party has four district councilors and ten union councillors.

== History ==
On 21 March 2013, E. R. Eswaran launched a new Political Party, Kongunadu Makkal Desiya Katchi (KMDK), from KMK after differences arose between him and KMK party president 'Best' Ramasamy. He also became the general secretary of KMDK. He contested the May 2009 Loksabha elections as a KMK candidate in the Coimbatore constituency and came third, securing 1.28 lakh votes. He also came third in the 2009 by election for Thondamuthur Assembly Constituency.

It represents members of the Gounder community and has been establishing a presence in western districts of Tamil Nadu, also referred to as Kongu Nadu, which has traditionally been a stronghold of the AIADMK party.

== 2021 Tamil Nadu State elections ==
In the 2021 elections, the party contested in Secular Progressive Alliance in three constituencies Kongu Nadu Region (Thiruchengode, Perundurai and Sulur constituencies).

KMDK general secretary E. R. Eswaran won in Tiruchengode, securing 81,688 votes (44.23%). The other two seats were lost.

== 2019 Lok Sabha election ==
The party has contested the 2019 Lok Sabha elections as part of United Progressive Alliance led by the DMK in Tamil Nadu.

2019 Indian general election : Namakkal
Party	Candidate	Votes	%	±%
KMDK	A. K. P. Chinraj	626,293	55.43%	29.64%
AIADMK	P. Kaliappan	3,61,142	31.96%	−22.06%
NTK	B. Baskar	38,531	3.41%	
MNM	R. Thangavelu	30,947	2.74%	
Independent	P. P. Saminathan	23,347	2.07%	
NOTA	None of the above	15,073	1.33%	−0.20%
Margin of victory		2,65,151	23.47%	−4.76%
Turnout		11,29,890	80.22%	1.50%
Registered electors		14,13,599		6.32%
KMDK gain from AIADMK		Swing	1.41%	

KMDK got Namakkal Lok Sabha Constituency. Namakkal, a constituency known for concentrated Gounder population. KMDK had fielded AKP Chinnaraj, the President of Tamilnadu Poultry Farmers Association.

The KMDK Candidate Won By a margin of 55.24% in 2019 elections; the party men celebrated their first ever electoral win since the launch of the party in Namakkal.

Also, KMDK is considered to be played a pivotal role for the win of DMK in Kongu region which has been known as ADMK fort

== 2016 Tamil Nadu State elections ==
In the 2016 elections, the party contested alone in 72 constituencies predominantly in Kongu Nadu Region (Krishnagiri, Dharmapuri, Salem, Namakkal, Karur, Erode, Tiruppur, Dindugal, Coimbatore and Nilgiris districts of Tamilnadu).

KMDK lost in all 72 Assembly seats contested but polled 1.70 Lakh votes.

KMDK Also contested in Hat symbol in all 72 constituencies.

== 2014 Lok Sabha election ==
The party contested the 2014 Lok Sabha alliance as a part of National Democratic Alliance led by the BJP. Party General Secretary E. R. Eswaran contested in Pollachi Lok Sabha, the lone seat allotted for the party from the alliance and finished second with 276,118 votes.

2014 Indian general election : Pollachi
Party	Candidate	Votes	%	±%
AIADMK	C. Mahendran	4,17,092	41.72%	1.95%
KMDK	E. R. Eswaran	2,76,118	27.62%	25.43%
DMK	Pongalur N. Palanisamy	2,51,829	25.19%	−8.60%
INC	Selvaraj	30,014	3.00%	
NOTA	None of the above	12,947	1.30%	
Independent	M. Mary Stella	4,942	0.49%	
Margin of victory		1,40,974	14.10%	8.12%
Turnout		9,99,720	73.31%	−3.22%
Registered electors		13,81,505		35.73%
AIADMK hold		Swing	1.95%	

== See also ==
- Kongu Nadu Statehood movement
- List of political parties in India
