= C. Chandrasekaran =

Indian politician

C. Chandrasekaran is an Indian politician and a Member of the Legislative Assembly of Tamil Nadu.

Chandrasekaran was first elected to the Tamil Nadu legislative assembly as a Dravida Munnetra Kazhagam (DMK) candidate from Sendamangalam constituency in the 1996 election. The constituency was reserved for candidates from the Scheduled Tribes.

Chandrasekaran contested the 2006 state assembly elections as an independent candidate after being refused nomination by the DMK. He subsequently joined the All India Anna Dravida Munnetra Kazhagam (AIADMK) party in 2007 and in the 2016 elections, he was again elected from the Sendamangalam constituency, this time as a candidate of the AIADMK.
