= Kongunadu Munnetra Kazhagam =

- Leader: Best .S.Ramasamy Gounder
- Founded: 15 February 2009
- Headquarters: Coimbatore, Tamil Nadu
- Ideology: Indigenism; Social conservatism
- Political position: Centre-right
- ECI status: registered Unrecognised Party
- Alliance: DPA (2011,2014-2019); BJP+ (2011); AIADMK+ (2019-present)

Party flag

Website
- https://www.kongunadumunnetrakazhagam.com/

Kongunadu Munnetra Kazhagam (KMK) is a caste based political party representing the Kongu Vellala Gounders, a backward caste in the Indian state of Tamil Nadu. The party's vote base is mainly concentrated in the Kongu Nadu region of Tamil Nadu.

== Origins and platform ==
The party launched in the name of "Kongunadu Munnetra Peravai" but later its leaders adopted the already registered name of "Kongunadu Munnetra Kazhagam". It was launched in 2009 at Coimbatore by the Kongu Vellala Goundergal Peravai, a Gounder caste organisation. Although the party was launched by a Gounder organisation, the party's founder Best Ramasamy dismissed that the party was only for the cause of Kongu Velala Gounders and said that his party will work for the cause of western Tamil Nadu. The party also claims that it will work for development of the Kongu region.

== 2009 Lok Sabha election ==
The party contested in 12 constituencies independently (without alliance) in the 2009 Lok Sabha elections and polled around 6 lakhs (600,000) votes in the Kongu region. Although the party was not able to win any seat still it was considered as a good show by political observers as the party was started only 4 months before the elections. The party mainly contributed for the defeat of all Congress - Dravida Munnetra Kazhagam (DMK) alliance candidates in the Kongu region of Tamil Nadu. The party came third in many constituencies ahead of Vijayakanth's Desiya Murpokku Dravida Kazhagam.

== 2011 Assembly election ==
In the 2011 Tamil Nadu Assembly elections, KMK joined hands with DMK and contested 7 seats. It lost in all the 7 seats and in local body elections, the party allied with the Bharatiya Janata Party (BJP).

== Election history ==
Year	Election	Votes polled	Seats contested	Seats won	Alliance with
2009	2009 Indian general election	5,79,704	12	0	--
2011	2011 Tamil Nadu Legislative Assembly election	3,70,044	7	0	United Progressive Alliance

== See also ==
- Kongu Nadu Statehood movement
