= V. V. Swaminathan =

Indian politician and statesman

V. V. Swaminathan is an attorney, retired politician, and early member of the All India Anna Dravida Munnetra Kazhagam. Swaminathan served as a Member of Parliament for Tamil Nadu in the Rajya Sabha. He was the first member of Dravida Munnetra Kazhagam (DMK) to serve as the municipal chair for Chidambaram. He was also an early member of the All India Anna Dravida Munnetra Kazhagam (AIADMK), and served in the 8th Tamil Nadu Assembly from 1985–1988. As a member of the second and third ministries of M. G. Ramachandran, the Second Nedunchezhiyan ministry, and the ministry of V N. Janaki, he held 13 portfolios simultaneously, including as minister for prohibition and excise, handlooms, information, tourism and electricity.

== Electoral performance ==
Election	Constituency	Political party	Result	Vote %	Opposition			Ref
Election	Constituency	Political party	Result	Vote %	Candidate	Political party	Vote %	Ref
1980	Bhuvanagiri	AIADMK	Won	49.10%	K. S. Asanudeen	Independent	41.56%	
1984	Bhuvanagiri	AIADMK	Won	56.20%	Durai Krishnamoorthy	DMK	42.89%	
1989	Bhuvanagiri	AIADMK	Lost	15.99%	S. Sivalogam	DMK	46.50%	
