= A. Thamizhmahan Hussain =

Presidium Chairman of All India Anna Dravida Munnetra Kazhagam

9th Presidium Chairman of AIADMK
- Incumbent
- Assumed office 23 June 2022
- General Secretary: Edappadi K. Palaniswami
- Preceded by: E. Madhusudhanan

Interim Presidium Chairman of AIADMK
- In office 1 December 2021 – 22 June 2022
- Coordinators: O. Panneerselvam; Edappadi K. Palaniswami

Chairman of Tamil Nadu Waqf Board
- In office 10 September 2012 – 13 April 2016
- Preceded by: S. Abdul Rahman
- Succeeded by: A. Anwhar Raajhaa

Personal details
- Born: 10 February 1936 (age 90) Kanyakumari, Tamil Nadu, India)
- Party: All India Anna Dravida Munnetra Kazhagam (since 1972)
- Occupation: Politician

A. Thamizhmahan Hussain (born 10 February 1936) is an Indian politician and Presidium Chairman of the All India Anna Dravida Munnetra Kazhagam party from 23 June 2022. A founding member of All India Anna Dravida Munnetra Kazhagam, he also served as All World M.G.R. Forum Secretary. He is the former chairperson of Tamil Nadu Waqf Board from 2012 to 2016.

Hussian was one of those 11 party cadres who signed the form to register AIADMK as a political party led by M. G. Ramachandran. Since the formation of the party in 1972, Hussain has held some crucial posts in the party. He served as the first AIADMK district secretary of Kanyakumari.

During 2016 Tamil Nadu Legislative Assembly election, he resigned as the Tamil Nadu wakf board chairman on 13 April 2016, As he was announced as the AIADMK Candidate for Palayamkottai Assembly constituency. He was later replaced by Hyder Ali as Aiadmk MLA Candidate.

On 1 December 2021, he was made the interim presidium chairman of the party. On 23 June 2022, A. Thamizhmahan Hussain was unanimously elected as the presidium chairman of the party at a general council meeting held at the Shrivaaru Venkatachalapathy Palace in Vanagaram, Chennai.
