= R. K. Kumar =

Raghavachari Krishna Kumar Shri

Member of Parliament (Rajya Sabha)
- In office 1996–1999

Personal details
- Born: August 7, 1942 October 3, 1999 (aged 57)
- Party: All India Anna Dravida Munnetra Kazhagam
- Spouse(s): Chandini Kumar, Vijayapriya
- Profession: Politician, Chartered Accountant

Raghavachari Krishna Kumar (August 7, 1942 – October 3, 1999) was an Indian politician from the All India Anna Dravida Munnetra Kazhagam.

== Family ==
Kumar was born on August 7, 1942, to K. C. Raghavachari and Seethalakshmi. He passed out his Bachelor of commerce from the Tribhuvan University and won the Gold Medal from the King of Nepal for standing out first in the Final Examinations. He also passed out his LLB and Chartered Accountancy examinations in 1969 and did his internship with Mohinder Puri and Co., Chartered Accountants in New Delhi.

He was appointed the director of Canara Bank for a period of three years beginning in 1983.

He served as a member of the Rajya Sabha from April 3, 1996, to October 10, 1999. He was married to Chandini Kumar and Vijayapriya, and had three children.

He was also the Minister of State for Finance from April 1996 till May 1998 and served under the leadership of Atal Bihari Vajpayee (who was the then prime minister of India).
