= Thevar Jayanthi =

Annual Commemoration in Tamil Nadu

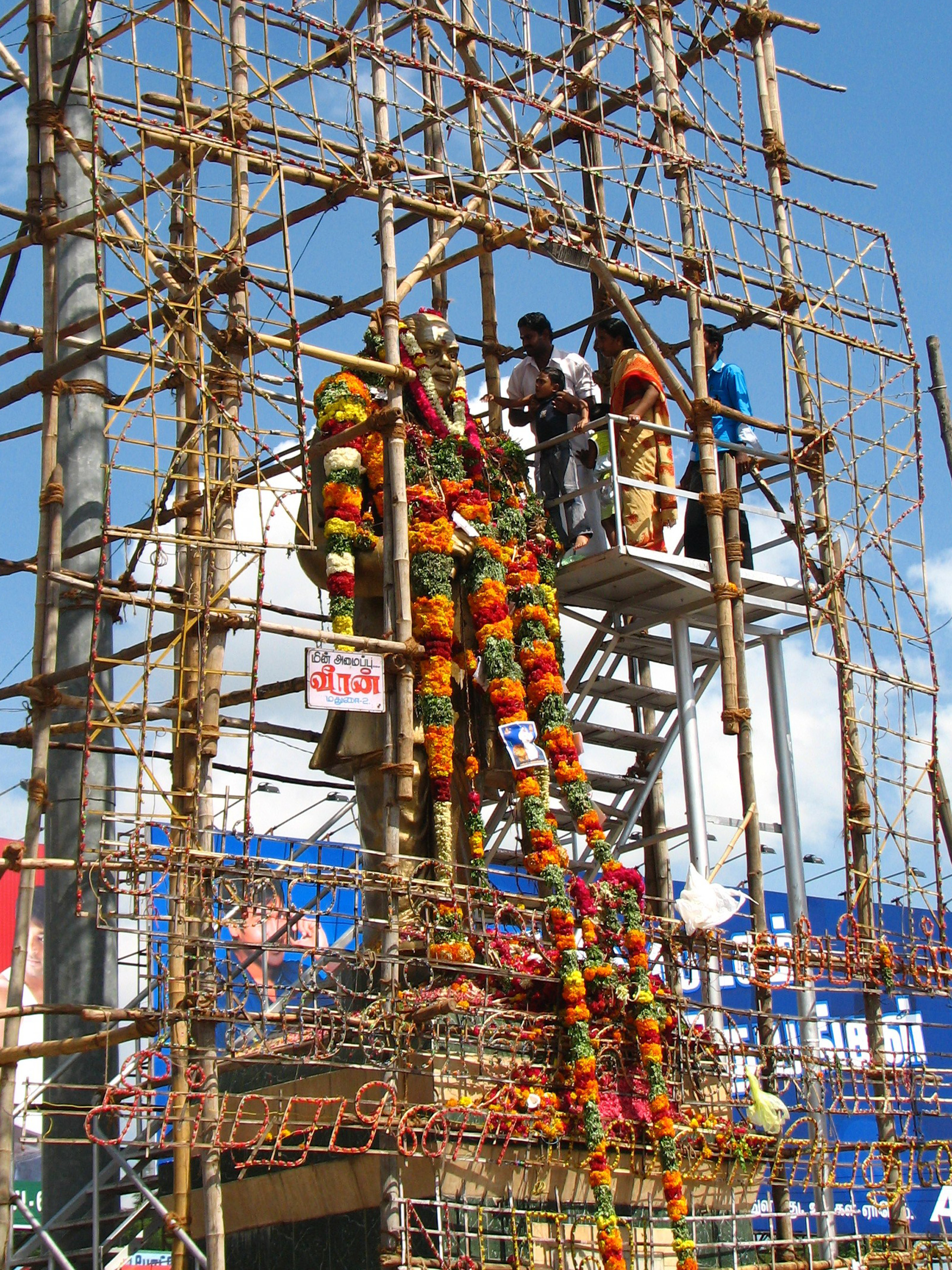
Garlanding Pasumpon Muthuramalingam Thevar's statue in Madurai during the 2007 Thevar Jayanthi centenary

Thevar Jayanthi ("birth anniversary of Thevar"), which falls on 30 October, is an annual commemoration of the birth anniversary of Pasumpon Muthuramalingam Thevar. It is celebrated primarily by the Thevar community in the southern districts of Tamil Nadu, the southernmost state of India. Although not an official public holiday, many schools and businesses in the area remain closed on the day.

== Background ==
Although Thevar was active in politics, it is mainly his spiritual discourse that explains his following after his death. Additionally, the fact that his date of birth and death lie close to each other has been interpreted as a sign of supernatural powers.

== Thevar Shrine ==
One of the main events on Thevar Jayanthi takes place at the samadhi (burial place) of Pasumpon Muthuramalinga Thevar, located some 50 miles distance from Madurai. People gather to take part in the ceremonies at the samadhi on 30 October. In recent years, the ceremony at the samadhi has begun to attract politicians. Former Chief Minister M. Karunanidhi installed the 16-foot-tall statue of Muthuramalinga Thevar at the intersection of Goripalayam in Madurai on 5 January 1974. He also constructed the memorial for Thevar at Pasumpon village.

== Thevar Jayanthi ==
In 1979, Chief Minister M. G. Ramachandran announced the birth anniversary of Thevar to be celebrated as a government event. On 19 October 1994, then Chief Minister Jayalalithaa installed a life-size bronze statue of Thevar at the Nandanam junction facing the arterial Anna Salai in Chennai.

== Golden Armour ==
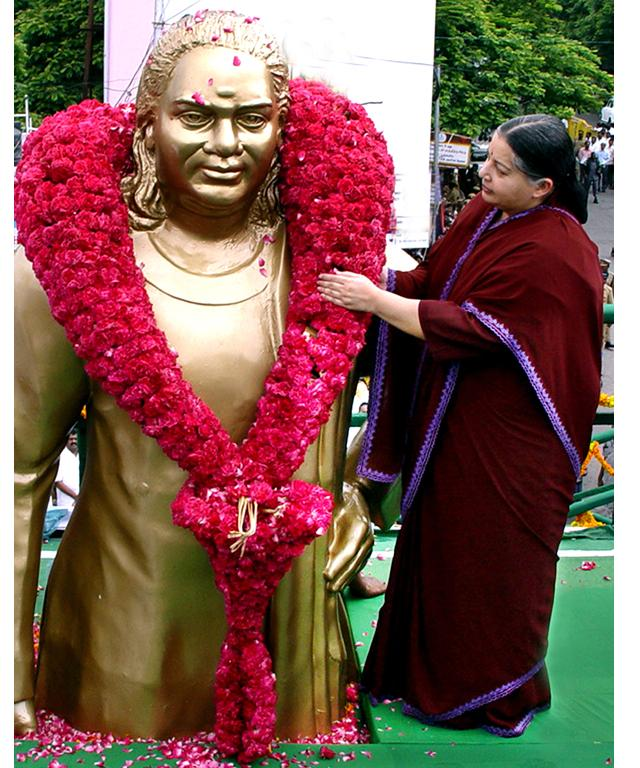
Jayalalithaa garlands the Thevar statue at Nandanam in 2004

Tamil Nadu opposition leader J. Jayalalithaa visited the Thevar memorial on 30 October 2010 during Gurupooja. Many from the Thevar community requested that she donate a gold armour for the statue. On 9 February 2014, J. Jayalalithaa, then Chief Minister of Tamil Nadu, donated a gold armour to cover the 3.5-foot-tall statue. The gold armour weighs 13 kg and is estimated to be worth Rs 4 crore. The armour is kept in a nationalized bank locker in Madurai, and will be taken out and handed over to the organizer of the memorial every year between 28 and 30 October to observe Thevar Jayanthi Celebrations.

== Political controversy ==
The All India Forward Bloc, the political party to which Pasumpon Muthuramalingam Thevar belonged, has demanded that Thevar Jayanthi be declared a public holiday in Tamil Nadu.

The event is not entirely uncontroversial. The CPI(ML) Liberation has charged that the Tamil Nadu government should stop sponsoring Thevar Jayanthi celebrations, claiming that the event is exploited by the Casteist forces.

The Thevar community is spread largely across the Madurai belt which includes Theni, Dindigul, Sivaganga, and Ramanathapuram. Historically, the Thevars have been a politically influential community and fall under the MBC in the caste category.

== 2007 centenary celebrations ==
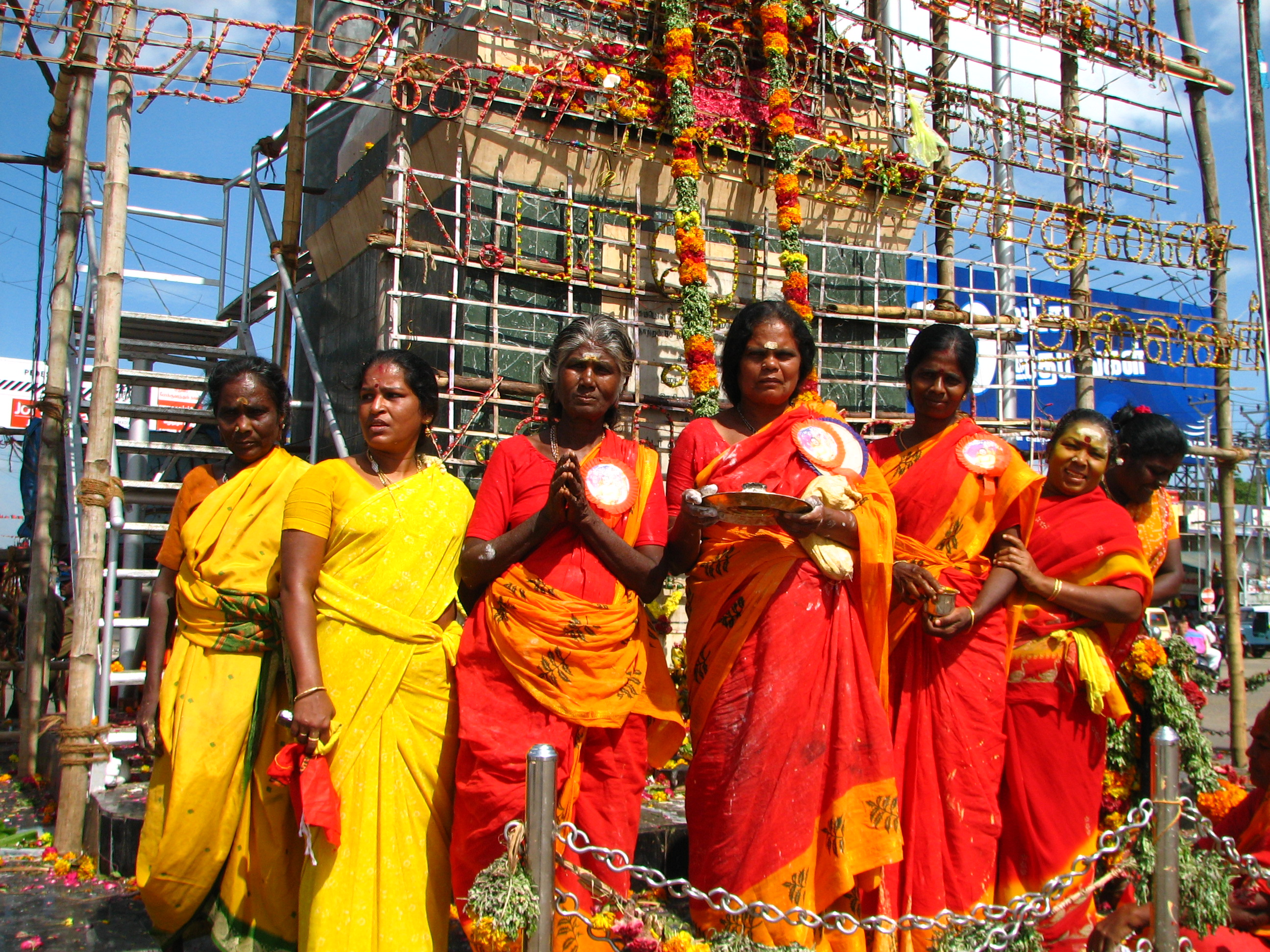
A Group of women adores the thevar statue at Madurai in 2007

On 30 October 2007, the birth centenary of Pasumpon Muthuramalingam Thevar was celebrated. TN Chief Minister M. Karunanidhi took part in the celebrations in Pasumpon village. This was the first time in two decades that M. Karunanidhi participated in Thevar Jayanthi. At the celebrations, Karunanidhi suggested that Madurai Airport be renamed after Pasumpon Muthuramalingam Thevar. These moves were seen as an attempt by Karunanidhi's Dravida Munnetra Kazhagam (DMK) party to challenge the supremacy of the rival All India Anna Dravida Munnetra Kazhagam (AIADMK) over the Thevar community. The AIADMK leader J. Jayalalithaa criticized Karunanidhi's participation in the Thevar Jayanthi centenary program, stating that he did not believe in Thevar's ideas. Moreover, she claimed that her previous government had allocated 30 million rupees for the Thevar Jayanthi centenary, but that Karunanidhi's government had spent only five million rupees.

== 116th Thevar Jayanthi (30 October 2023) ==
On 30 October 2023, marking the 116th Thevar Jayanthi and the 61st Guru Pooja, Tamil Nadu Chief Minister M. K. Stalin led the observance by garlanding the statue of freedom fighter Pasumpon Muthuramalinga Thevar at the Goripalayam junction in Madurai. He was accompanied by senior DMK ministers and leaders, including P. Moorthy, Palanivel Thiaga Rajan, Thangam Thennarasu, Anbil Mahesh Poyyamozhi, and Madurai Mayor Indrani Pon Vasanth. Following the tribute, the CM also laid foundation stones for flyover construction in Madurai and visited Pasumpon, honoring Thevar at his memorial in Ramanathapuram.
