= Janaki ministry =

Government of Tamil Nadu, India in 1988

Janaki Ministry
- 7th Ministry of Tamil Nadu
- Head of the government
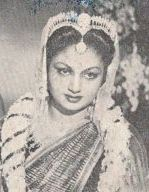
- Tmt. V. N. Janaki Ramachandran; Former Chief Minister of Tamil Nadu
- Date formed: 7 January 1988
- Date dissolved: 30 January 1988

People and organisations
- Governor: S. L. Khurana
- Chief Minister: V. N. Janaki Ramachandran
- Chief Minister's history: Indian film actress
- Total no. of members: 8
- Member party: All India Anna Dravida Munnetra Kazhagam
- Status in legislature: Majority
- Opposition party: Indian National Congress
- Opposition leader: O. Subramanian

History
- Election: 1984
- Outgoing election: 1980
- Legislature term: 23 days
- Predecessor: Third Ramachandran ministry Second Nedunchezhiyan ministry(interim)
- Successor: Third Karunanidhi ministry

The Ministry of Janaki was the Council of Ministers, headed by V. N. Janaki Ramachandran, that was formed after the death of her husband and the former chief minister of Tamil Nadu M. G. Ramachandran (M.G.R.) with the support of some senior prominent members headed by R. M. Veerappan. On 7 January 1988, the council took office.

She was the first women Chief minister of Tamilnadu and her ministry was dismissed following pandemonium in the Tamil Nadu Legislative Assembly following a motion of no confidence on 28 January.

== Constitutional requirement ==
=== For the Council of Ministers to aid and advise Governor ===
According to Article 163 of the Indian Constitution,

# There shall be a Council of Ministers with the Chief Minister at the head to aid and advise the Governor in the exercise of his function, except in so far as he is by or under this Constitution required to exercise his functions or any of them in his discretion.

1. If any question arises whether any matter is or is not a matter as respects which the Governor is by or under this Constitution required to act in his discretion, the decision of the Governor in his discretion shall be final, and the validity of anything done by the Governor shall not be called in question on the ground that he ought or ought not to have acted in his discretion.
2. The question whether any, and if so what, advice was tendered by Ministers to the Governor shall not be inquired into in any court.

This means that the Ministers serve under the pleasure of the Governor and he/she may remove them, on the advice of the Chief Minister, whenever they want.

The Chief Minister shall be appointed by the Governor and the other Ministers shall be appointed by the Governor on the advice of the Chief Minister, and the Minister shall hold office during the pleasure of the Governor:
Provided that in the States of Bihar, Madhya Pradesh and Odisha, there shall be a Minister in charge of tribal welfare who may in addition be in charge of the welfare of the Scheduled Castes and backward classes or any other work.

# The Council of Minister shall be collectively responsible to the Legislative Assembly of the State.

1. Before a Minister enters upon his office, the Governor shall administer to him the oaths of office and of secrecy according to the forms set out for the purpose in the Third Schedule.
2. A Minister who for any period of six consecutive months is not a member of the Legislature of the State shall at the expiration of that period cease to be a Minister.
3. The salaries and allowances of Ministers shall be such as the Legislature of the State may from time to time by law determine and, until the Legislature of the State so determines, shall be a specified in the Second Schedule.

== Council of Ministers ==
=== Cabinet (7 January 1988 – 30 January 1988) ===
Chief Minister
No.	Name	Constituency	Portfolio	Departments	Political party
1	V. N. Janaki Ramachandran	did not contest	Chief Minister	Indian Administrative Service; Indian Police Service and other All Indian Services; Home; Prevention of Corruption; Finance; General Administration; Revenue; Cooperation; Legislature; Elections; Statistics; Youth Service Crops, and; Industries	All India Anna Dravida Munnetra Kazhagam
Cabinet Ministers
2	R. M. Veerappan	Tirunelveli	Minister for Local Administration	Municipal Administration; Panchayats; Panchayats Unions; Community Development and Rural Indebtedness; Labour; Censes Employment and Training; Indian Overseas; Refugees and Evacuees; Iron and Steel Control; News Print Control; Stationary and Printing; Government Press; Food, and; Price Control	All India Anna Dravida Munnetra Kazhagam
3	P. U. Shanmugam	Melmalayanur	Minister for Health	Health; Environment Pollution Control; Backward Classes; Fisheries; Handlooms and Textiles; Housing and Slum Clearance Boards; Town Planning, and; Accommodation Control	All India Anna Dravida Munnetra Kazhagam
4	C. Ponnaiyan	Tiruchengode	Minister for Education and Law	Education; Official language; Tamil Development and Culture; Law; Courts; Prisons; Deputy Collectors; Legislation on Weight and Measures; Debt Relief including legislation on Money Lending, Chits, Registration of Companies and Molasses, and; Agriculture	All India Anna Dravida Munnetra Kazhagam
5	S. Muthusamy	Erode	Minister for Transport	Transport; Nationalised Transport; Motor Vehicles Act; Ports and Highways; Public District Revenue Officers; Rural Industries including Cottage and Small Industries; Water Supply and Drainage Board; Public Works, and; Irrigation	All India Anna Dravida Munnetra Kazhagam
6	V. V. Swaminathan	Bhuvanagiri	Minister for Tourism, Prohibition and Electricity	Prohibition and Excise; Animal Husbandry; Milk Dairy Development; Registration and Stamp Act; Information and Publicity; Film Technology; Tourism; Tourism Development Corporation; Cinematograph Act; Hindu Religious and Charitable Endowments; Forests; Cinchona; Planning; Archaeology; Passports; Electricity, and; Waqf	All India Anna Dravida Munnetra Kazhagam
7	T. Ramasamy	Ramanathapuram	Minister for Commercial Taxes	Commercial Taxes; Nutritious Meals; Khadi; Bhoodan, and; Gramdhan	All India Anna Dravida Munnetra Kazhagam
8	A. Arunachalam	Varahur	Minister for Adi Dravidar Welfare	Adi Dravidar Welfare; Hill Tribes and Bonded Labour; Social Welfare including Women and Children's welfare; Beggars' Home; Orphanages, and; Correctional Administrative	All India Anna Dravida Munnetra Kazhagam
