= All India Anna Dravida Munnetra Kazhagam =

Indian political party

- Abbreviation: AIADMK
- General Secretary: Edappadi K. Palaniswami
- Parliamentary Chairperson: M. Thambidurai
- Rajya Sabha Leader: M. Thambidurai
- Treasurer: Dindigul C. Sreenivasan
- Founder: M. G. Ramachandran
- Founded: 17 October 1972; 54 years ago
- Split from: Dravida Munnetra Kazhagam
- Headquarters: Puratchi Thalaivar M. G. R. Maaligai, 226, V. P. Raman Salai, Royapettah, Chennai – 600014, Tamil Nadu, India
- Newspaper: Namadhu Amma (Tamil)
- Student wing: AIADMK Students' Wing
- Youth wing: M. G. R. Youth Wing
- Women's wing: AIADMK Women's Wing
- Labour wing: Anna Thozhirsanga Peravai
- Peasant's wing: AIADMK Agriculture Wing
- Ideology: Populism; Social democracy Welfarism; Secularism; Regionalism; Social justice Tamil nationalism
- Political position: Centre
- Colours: Green
- ECI status: State party
- Alliance: National Alliance NDA (1998–1999, 2004, 2019–2023, 2025–present); Regional Alliances AIADMK-led Alliance (1977–present); Former Alliances: Congress alliance (1977–1979, 1984–1988, 1989–1996, 1999–2002) (Tamil Nadu); Janata Alliance (1979–1980) (Tamil Nadu); Third Front (2009); Left Front (1973–1984, 1999–2002, 2009–2014)
- Seats in Rajya Sabha: 4 / 245
- Seats in Lok Sabha: 0 / 543
- Seats in State Legislative Assemblies: 41 / 234 (Tamil Nadu) 1 / 30 (Puducherry)
- Number of states and union territories in government: 1 / 31

Election symbol
- Two Leaves

Party flag

Website
- AIADMK

The All India Anna Dravida Munnetra Kazhagam (AIADMK; transl. All India Anna Dravidian Progressive Federation) is an Indian regional political party with the most influence in the union territory of Puducherry and the state of Tamil Nadu. It is a Dravidian party adhering to the policies of socialism and secularism based on the principles of C. N. Annadurai collectively coined as Annaism. The party is one of the most successful political outfits in Tamil Nadu and has won the majority in the Tamil Nadu Legislative Assembly most number of times (seven). The party is headquartered at Puratchi Thalaivar M. G. R. Maaligai located at Royapettah in Chennai.

The party was founded on 17 October 1972 after breaking away from the Dravida Munnetra Kazhagam (DMK). M. G. Ramachandran launched the party, which was earlier registered by Anakaputhur Ramalingam, and became its first general secretary. It was founded after Ramachandran was expelled from the DMK by its president M. Karunanidhi after he demanded the accounts of the party as the party treasurer. The party won the elections to the Tamil Nadu Legislative Assembly three consecutive times in 1977, 1980, and 1985 under the leadership of Ramachandran, who served as the chief minister of Tamil Nadu from 1977 to 1987.

After Ramachandran's death in December 1987, the party was split briefly between Ramachandran's wife V. N. Janaki and J. Jayalalithaa. The party was led by Jayalalithaa from January 1988 till her death in December 2016. Jayalalithaa served as the chief minister of Tamil Nadu six times. She was popular among the party cadres, and was fondly referred to as "Amma" (Mother).

After Jayalalithaa's death and brief tussle for leadership, the party was under the dual leadership of O. Panneerselvam and Edappadi K. Palaniswami as coordinator and joint coordinator respectively from August 2017 23 June 2022. Paneerselvan succeeded Jayalilathaa as the chief minister briefly, before Palaniswami occupied the position from February 2017 to May 2021. Since 11 July 2022, the party has been led by Palaniswami, who serves as the general secretary.

== Ideology and policies ==
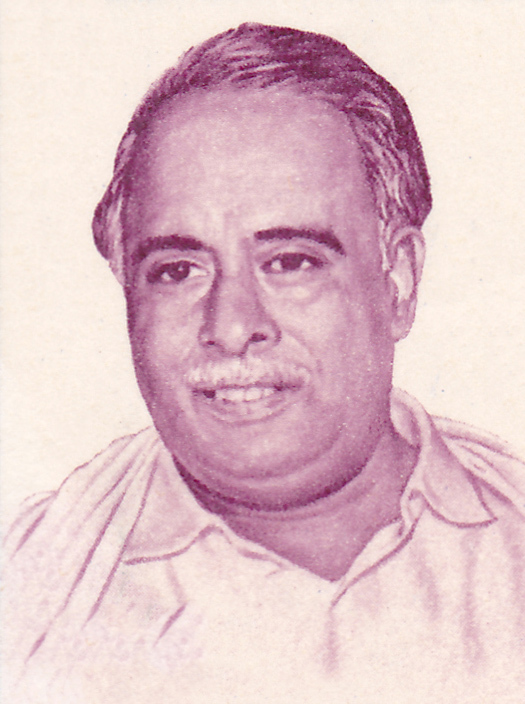
C.N. Annadurai, ideologue of the party

The AIADMK sought to depoliticise the education policy of the government by not insisting that education be in the Tamil language. Policies of the AIADMK were targeted at the poorer segments of Tamil society—the poor, rickshaw pullers, and destitute women—and centralising the massive Puratchi Thalaivar M.G.R. Nutritious Meal Programme for children. There was ambivalence towards the reservation policy and the interests of farmers. The party functions on the principles and the ideals of E. V. Ramasami and the former chief ministers of Tamil Nadu C. N. Annadurai, M. G. Ramachandran and J. Jayalalithaa.

The AIADMK posted an array of welfare schemes targeting the human development index of the state. The AIADMK has schemes listed in the election manifestos covering segments of the population, including fishermen, farmers, and schoolchildren. Until the 2000s, the parties had welfare programmes such as maternity leave, subsidies for public transportation, and educational grants. After the 2000s, the parties started competing at an increasing level for the distribution of consumer goods. The AIADMK government distributed free bicycles to class 11 and 12 students during its tenure of 2001–06. In its manifesto for the 2006 assembly elections, the DMK promised free colour televisions in competition with other parties. The competition continued during the 2011 assembly elections, when both parties announced free laptops for school students and mixers, fans, and blenders for the public.

=== Culture ===
The party remains firm in its support for the "two-language policy", in opposition to demands to have Hindi as the sole lingua franca language, where Tamil and English are the two main languages of Tamil Nadu. The party provided ₹1 lakh (US$1,100) for temples of local deities in 2016.

=== Economy ===
In 2012, the AIADMK-led government announced the "Vision 2023" document, which embodied a strategic plan for infrastructure development that included raising the per capita income of residents to $10 thousand per annum, matching the Human Development Index to that of developed countries by 2023, providing high-quality infrastructure all over the state, and making Tamil Nadu the knowledge capital and innovation hub of India. This project had three components: the overall vision document, the compilation of the project profile, and the road map. In the spring of 2019, the party lauded the economic policies of the Narendra Modi-led government, stating that the government had ushered in economic stability and made the country a "decisive player" in regional economics, and voiced support for the Goods and Services Tax (GST), which had been opposed by their rival, the Dravida Munnetra Kazhagam.

During the AIADMK regime, Tamil Nadu was the best-performing big state overall from 2018 to 2021. With a gross state domestic product of $290 billion, or ₹21.6 lakh crore, Tamil Nadu became India's second-largest economy.

=== Social justice ===
In 1980, the AIADMK under M. G. Ramachandran reversed his decision on economic criteria after the AIADMK faced a close defeat in the Indian general election in Tamil Nadu. He further raised the quota for the backward classes from 31% to 50%, bringing the total reservation to 68%. In November 1980, MGR led AIADMK government promulgated an ordinance, abolishing the traditional village officer (V. O.) system, removing around 24,000 incumbents and replacing them with Village Administrative Officers (V. A. O.) recruited through examinations. In 1993, the AIADMK government under J. Jayalalithaa passed the Tamil Nadu Backward Classes, Scheduled Castes, and Scheduled Tribes Bill, 1993, in the Assembly (Act 45 of 1994). The bill was sent to the president for approval. The government led a cross-party committee of Tamil Nadu politicians to Delhi to meet with the central government. She also demanded that the government of Tamil Nadu's act be placed in the ninth schedule of the Indian Constitution, ensuring that the law cannot be challenged in any court. Later, on 19 July 1994, the presidential assent was received, and it confirmed the 69% reservation for Tamil Nadu.

In 1994, Jayalalithaa government introduced a 33% reservation for women in local bodies in line with the 73rd Constitutional Amendment Act of 1992, mandating such reservation in Panchayati Raj Institutions. In 2001, Jayalalithaa government ordered that women and Scheduled Castes be given reservation for two consecutive terms in local bodies, noting that the 73rd Constitutional Amendment does not specify the rotation period. The move aimed to help first-time representatives overcome initial socio-economic and administrative challenges and function more effectively. On 20 February 2016, the Jayalalithaa-led AIADMK government passed the Tamil Nadu Municipal Laws (Amendment) Act, 2016, and the Tamil Nadu Panchayats (Amendment) Act, 2016, in the Tamil Nadu legislative assembly, further enhancing the reservation for women from 33% to 50% in local bodies such as municipal corporations, municipalities, town panchayats, and village panchayats of the state.

=== State water policy ===
In 2006, the AIADMK initiated a case in the Supreme Court to uphold the state's rights on the Mullaperiyar Dam issue. As a result, in May 2014, a Supreme Court verdict allowed Tamil Nadu to increase the storage level in the Mullaperiyar Dam to 142 feet from 136 feet and struck down the unconstitutional law enacted by the government of Kerala in 2006 restricting the storage level to 136 feet. This Supreme Court decision ensured the farmers' and people's livelihoods in the southern districts of Tamil Nadu. In February 2013, the government of India notified the final award of the Cauvery Water Disputes Tribunal (CWDT) on the directions of the Supreme Court. After 22 years of legal battle, chief minister of Tamil Nadu J. Jayalalithaa called it a "tremendous achievement" of her government that the state had received due justice. Then Jayalalithaa said that it was the happiest day of her life and the happiest day for the farmers in Tamil Nadu; she recalled her famous fast-unto-death at Marina Beach in 1993.

=== Education ===
MGR led AIADMK government introduced the 10+2 system in 1978 by abolishing the PUC and moving higher secondary education to schools (Class 11 and Class 12), with infrastructure such as laboratories added to improve rural access. The resulting rise in demand for college education led the MGR government to encourage private engineering colleges, beginning in the early 1980s, with a policy reserving 50% of seats under government quota and restricting capitation fees.

In May 2017, Palaniswami government formed a high-level committee to reform the Tamil Nadu school education system. The school textbook syllabus and exam pattern for classes 1 to 12 were revised on par with CBSE standards in phases, starting from the 2018–19 academic year, to better prepare students for competitive exams. In May 2020, the Palaniswami led AIADMK government passed an order for reservation of 7.5% of seats in government medical colleges to students from public schools.

=== Environment and nature ===
The AIADMK was one of two parties, along with the BJP, to not voice opposition against a ban on cattle slaughter through the national Prevention of Cruelty to Animals Act. However, it has sought an exemption in the Act regarding traditional bull fighting; the party supports popular opinion in Tamil Nadu that traditional bull fighting, known as Jallikattu, should not be banned by the central government due to an APEX court ruling against animal cruelty. During the controversy, the party demanded that the animal rights organisation PETA be banned.

In March 2017, the AIADMK government led by Edappadi K. Palaniswami implemented the Kudimaramathu Scheme to rejuvenate water bodies with the participation of agriculturalists, reviving the age-old practice of community participation in the maintenance and management of tank irrigation systems. In May 2018, the AIADMK government ordered the closure of the Sterlite Copper factory in Thoothukkudi in the interest of the people, knowing that the air and water in the city are being heavily polluted by the factory, which has been at the centre of violent protests by locals to protect and improve the environment. In February 2020, the AIADMK government declared the Cauvery Delta region a protected special agriculture zone. This announcement was widely hailed by political parties and farmer organisations. The AIADMK opposes the building of the Mekedatu Dam, which could reduce water flows into Tamil Nadu and negatively affect quality of life for residents and agriculture.

== History ==
=== M. G. Ramachandran era (1972–1987) ===
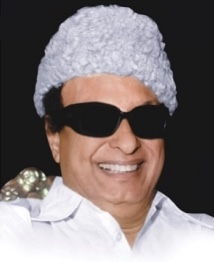
M. G. Ramachandran, the first general secretary of the party

The party was founded on 17 October 1972, as Anna Dravida Munnetra Kazhagam (ADMK) by M. G. Ramachandran (M. G. R.), a veteran Tamil film star and popular politician. It was set up as a breakaway faction from the Dravida Munnetra Kazhagam (DMK) after its president M. Karunanidhi expelled him from the party for demanding an account as the party treasurer. M. G. R., who wanted to start a new political party, then incorporated it into Anakaputhur Ramalingam's party, which had registered under the name ADMK. He then quoted, "I joined the party started by an ordinary cadre" and gave the post of Member of the Legislative Council to Ramalingam. On 12 September 1976, M. G. Ramachandran added the prefix “All India” (AI) to the party's name during its General Council meeting held in Coimbatore, a move intended to safeguard the party under the provisions of the Maintenance of Internal Security Act (MISA). Since its inception, the relationship between the AIADMK and the DMK has been marked by mutual hatred. M. G. R. used his fan club to build the party cadre; he claims his party recruited more than a million members in the first two months. C. N. Annadurai's ideologue and movie producer turned politician R. M. Veerappan was the key architect in unifying M. G. R. fan clubs and further consolidating the party structure in the 1970s. Other key leaders, such as Nanjil K. Manoharan and S. D. Somasundaram, played major roles in consolidation, and Pavalar M. Muthusamy was elected as the first presidium chairman of the party. Then Communist Party of India (CPI) state secretary M. Kalyanasundaram strongly backed M. G. R. and played a crucial role in shaping his political career by teaming up with the fledgling AIADMK. M. G. R., along with Kalyanasundaram, presented to the governor of Tamil Nadu, K. K. Shah, a charge against the Karunanidhi-led DMK government in November 1972. The party's first victories were the wins of K. Maya Thevar in the Dindigul parliamentary bye-election in May 1973 and of C. Aranganayagam in the Coimbatore West assembly bye-election a year later. Six MLAs from the DMK joined MGR following his expulsion from the party in October 1972. They were K. Kalimuthu, G. R. Edmund, Munu Adhi, C. Aranganayagam, S. M. Dorairaj, and P. Soundarapandian. By 1 November 1972, the number of DMK defectors supporting MGR had risen to nine MLAs and two Members of Parliament. The MPs were S. D. Somasundaram, the DMK Lok Sabha member from Thanjavur, and K. A. Krishnaswamy, a DMK member of the Rajya Sabha. On 2 April 1973, the AIADMK emerged as the third-largest political party in Tamil Nadu, represented by 11 MLAs in the assembly. By January 1976, the AIADMK emerged as the second-largest political party with 16 MLAs in the assembly. Extending its support to the National Emergency between 1975 and 1977, the party grew very close to the Indian National Congress (INC).

Party strength in the Tamil Nadu Assembly (1971–1976)
| Date | | | | |
| Date | DMK | AIADMK | Congress (O) | Congress (I) |
|---|---|---|---|---|
| 1 May 1971 (Note: Party strength after 1971 Election) | 182 | — | 15 | — |
| 1 Aug 1972 | 183 | — | 13 | 6 (Note: Four MLAs elected on the Praja Socialist Party ticket and two from the Kamaraj-led Congress (O) joined to form the Congress (I) in the legislature.) |
AIADMK formed on 17 October 1972 (Note: Defection of DMK MLAs to the newly founded AIADMK, much before the promulgation of 1985 Anti-defection law.)
| 1 Nov 1972 | ▼177 | ▲9 | 12 | 6 |
| 2 Apr 1973 | 174 | 11 | 12 | 6 |
| 31 Jan 1976 | 167 (Note: DMK’s strength declined from 174 to 167 as five DMK MLAs defected to the ADMK. Two others, including Satyavani Muthu, left the DMK in 1974 to form the Thazhthapattor Munnetra Kazhagam.) | 16 | 12 | 7 |

In 1974, AIADMK contested its first assembly election in Puducherry with its alliance partner CPI and won 14 of 30 seats in the legislative assembly. On 6 March 1974, S. Ramassamy was sworn in as chief minister of Puducherry for the short-lived government and became the first chief minister from the party after its establishment.

In Tamil Nadu, the Karunanidhi-led state government was dismissed by the Indira Gandhi-led central government on corruption charges in 1976. The AIADMK swept to power, defeating the DMK in the 1977 assembly election. On 30 June 1977, M. G. R. was sworn in as the chief minister of Tamil Nadu, becoming the first actor to become the chief minister in the Republic of India. In the 1977 general election, the party won 18 seats, and in the Puducherry assembly election, it won 14 seats and formed the government. On 2 July 1977, S. Ramassamy was sworn in as chief minister of Puducherry for a second term. In 1979, the AIADMK became the first Dravidian and regional party to join the Union Cabinet in the history of the Republic of India. Sathiavani Muthu and Aravinda Bala Pajanor were the members of parliament who joined the short-lived Union Ministry led by Prime Minister Charan Singh.

The relationship between the AIADMK and the INC slowly became strained. In the 1980 general election, the INC aligned with the DMK, and the alliance won 37 out of the 39 state parliamentary seats. The AIADMK won just two seats. After returning to power, Indira Gandhi dismissed many state governments belonging to the opposition parties, including the AIADMK government in Tamil Nadu.

In 1980, AIADMK contested its second assembly election in Tamil Nadu, allied with left parties, and won as the single majority party in the state assembly with 129 of 234 seats. On 9 June 1980, M. G. R. was sworn in as chief minister of Tamil Nadu for a second term, whereas the opposition DMK continued its alliance with the central government ruling INC(I) following the last general election and got a completely reversed result. The victory solidified M. G. R.'s position as a prominent leader in Tamil Nadu, further strengthening the AIADMK's influence in the state's political landscape. Meanwhile, the DMK faced significant challenges as it grappled with the consequences of its alliance, leading to a period of introspection and re-evaluation of its strategies for future elections.

On 4 June 1982, M. G. R.'s famous on-screen pair and popular actress J. Jayalalithaa joined the party. Her entry into politics marked the beginning of her rapid ascent within the party. On 28 January 1983, general secretary P. U. Shanmugam appointed her as the propaganda secretary. She was elected as a member of parliament to Rajya Sabha on 3 April 1984 by defeating Arcot N. Veerasamy of the Dravida Munnetra Kazhagam via indirect election.

In the 1984 general election, the party again aligned with the INC, and the alliance won 37 out of the 39 state parliamentary seats. During the 1984 assembly election, M. G. R. was in failing health and hospitalised in the United States for treatment, undergoing a kidney transplant; even though he was not in the country, the party won the election by winning 132 seats. M.G.R. returned to Tamil Nadu on 4 February 1985 following his recovery. He was sworn in as chief minister of Tamil Nadu for the third term on 10 February 1985. Many political historians consider M. G. R.'s persona and charisma at this time to be "infallible" and a logical continuation of his on-screen "good lad" image, strengthened by his "mythical status" in the minds of the masses. M. G. R. continued to enjoy popular support in his third term until his death. He died on 24 December 1987 and became the second chief minister in Tamil Nadu to die in office after Anna.

==== Succession conflict between the Janaki and Jayalalithaa factions ====
A week after following M. G. R.'s death, on 1 January 1988, member of parliament J. Jayalalithaa was elected general secretary of the party by the prominent members, and it was ratified by the party general council convened by her the next day. On the other hand, M. G. R.'s wife, V. N. Janaki Ramachandran, was elected the party's legislative leader by R. M. Veerappan and 98 other members of the legislative assembly. She was sworn in as the state's first female chief minister on 7 January 1988, becoming the first actress to become the chief minister in the Republic of India, and served for 23 days until the state assembly was dissolved and president's rule was imposed on 30 January 1988. The party began to split due to infighting, splitting into two factions, one led by Jayalalithaa and the other led by Janaki.

On 31 January 1988, the AIADMK headquarters on Lloyds Road, Royapettah, Chennai, was sealed for the first time in the party's history following the split. The action came about 15 hours after the dismissal of the Ministry headed by V. N. Janaki Ramachandran and the imposition of President's Rule, due to a dispute between rival factions. The building was taken over by authorities led by then Chennai Police Commissioner Walter Devaram. The property had been purchased by Janaki in 1957 and donated to the party in July 1986. The dispute reached the Madras High Court and later the Supreme Court of India. In May 1988, the Supreme Court allowed V. N. Janaki Ramachandran to retain the headquarters as a “receiver” for two months and directed the Additional District Magistrate to decide the issue, while also setting aside the High Court's earlier orders that had restrained the J. Jayalalithaa faction. In July 1988, the Magistrate ordered Janaki to hand over the office to the Jayalalithaa faction, which she complied with. However, on 31 January 1989, the High Court quashed the Magistrate's order on Janaki's petition, though the decision was stayed by the Supreme Court a week later. Meanwhile, some senior leaders of Jayalalithaa's faction V. R. Nedunchezhiyan, Panruti Ramachandran, Aranganayagam and Thirunavukkarasar formed a four-member front and began functioning independently due to differences with her. In response, Jayalalithaa, addressing a party meeting in Thanjavur on 17 August 1988, referred to them as “fallen hair strands” and urged party cadres to ignore them.

As the 1989 assembly election approaches, on 17 December 1988, the Election Commission of India froze the AIADMK electoral symbol "Two Leaves", called the Brahmastra of the party, and allotted Jayalalithaa the "Rooster" electoral symbol in the name of AIADMK(J) and Janaki the "Twin Pigeon" electoral symbol in the name of AIADMK(JA). In the 1989 assembly election, both factions contested the election with their symbols and alliances, which led the DMK to regain power after 13 years, with M. Karunanidhi returning as the chief minister of Tamil Nadu for the third term. Due to its split, the AIADMK suffered heavily in the election, with the Jayalalithaa and Janaki factions winning only 27 and 2 seats, respectively. Jayalalithaa-led AIADMK(J) became the main opposition party in the Tamil Nadu legislative assembly. The Janaki-led AIADMK(JA) routed the election; she realised that politics wasn't her thing and chose to quit. On 7 February 1989, the factions merged under the leadership of Jayalalithaa. Thereafter, the chief election commissioner R. V. S. Peri Sastri unfreezed the electoral symbol Two Leaves and granted it back to the Jayalalithaa-led united AIADMK on 8 February 1989. This pivotal moment marked a significant turnaround for the party, establishing Jayalalithaa as a formidable force in Tamil Nadu politics. Following the merger of the party factions, the party headquarters remained under Jayalalithaa's control, after she was unanimously elected general secretary. With renewed emphasis on party unity and a clear electoral strategy, she began to work towards regaining public support and restoring the party's influence in the state.

=== J. Jayalalithaa era (1989–2016) ===
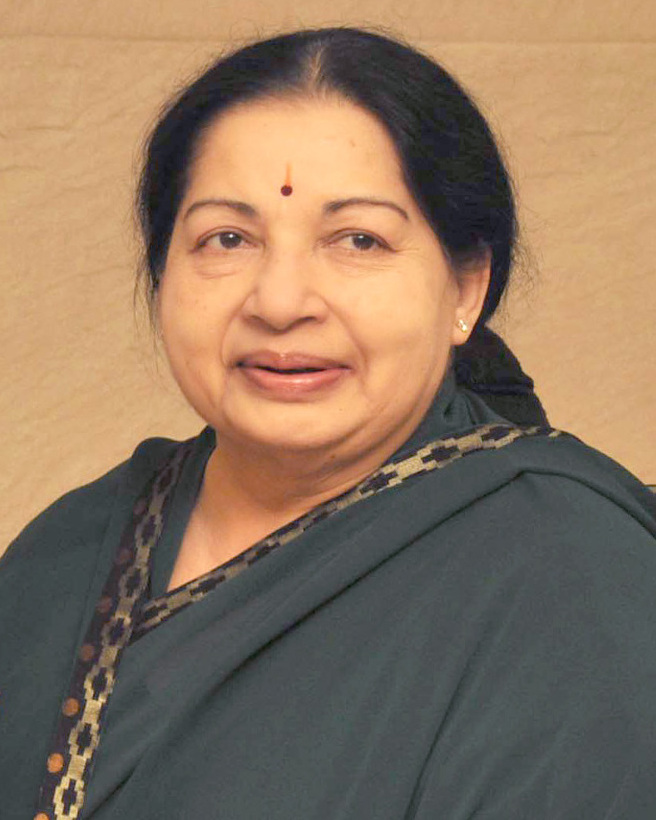
J. Jayalalithaa, the longest served general secretary of the party

On 9 February 1989, J. Jayalalithaa was elected the party's legislative leader and became the first and only female leader of the opposition in the Tamil Nadu legislative assembly. She was the first actress to become the leader of the opposition in the Republic of India. On 25 March 1989, a barbaric attack was unleashed on Jayalalithaa by the DMK ministers and members of the legislative assembly in the presence of the chief minister M. Karunanidhi and the speaker M. Tamilkudimagan. During the attack, the bundles of papers, pads, and large books were thrown over her; also, her saree was pulled and torn, and some of her hair was grabbed. AIADMK legislators, including Su. Thirunavukkarasar and K. K. S. S. R. Ramachandran, tried hard to protect and eject her from the assembly. She came out of the assembly after a disastrous moment with her torn saree and deformed hair, drawing a parallel with the shameful disrobing of Draupadi in the epic Mahabharata, vowing to return to the assembly only after becoming the chief minister.

In the 1989 general election, the party allied with the Indian National Congress (INC), and the alliance won 39 of 40 seats it contested in Tamil Nadu and Puducherry.

The AIADMK headquarters was sealed for the second time on 12 August 1990 after a group led by expelled leader S. Thirunavukkarasar entered the premises and clashed with supporters of Jayalalithaa. A dispute later arose over whether the police or revenue officials had sealed the building, with then Chennai Police Commissioner K. K. Rajasekharan Nair stating that the police had not done so. As the case reached the Supreme Court of India, the premises remained under an Executive Magistrate's custody for nearly four months under Section 145 of the Code of Criminal Procedure (India).In December 1990, the court restored the headquarters to the party and directed that the keys be handed over to J. Jayalalithaa, which was carried out by her counsel on 19 December.

In January 1991, the Chandra Shekhar-led central government dismissed the Karunanidhi-led state government on charges that the constitutional machinery in the state had broken down. After Rajiv Gandhi's death, the AIADMK-led Alliance swept the 1991 assembly election and regained power.

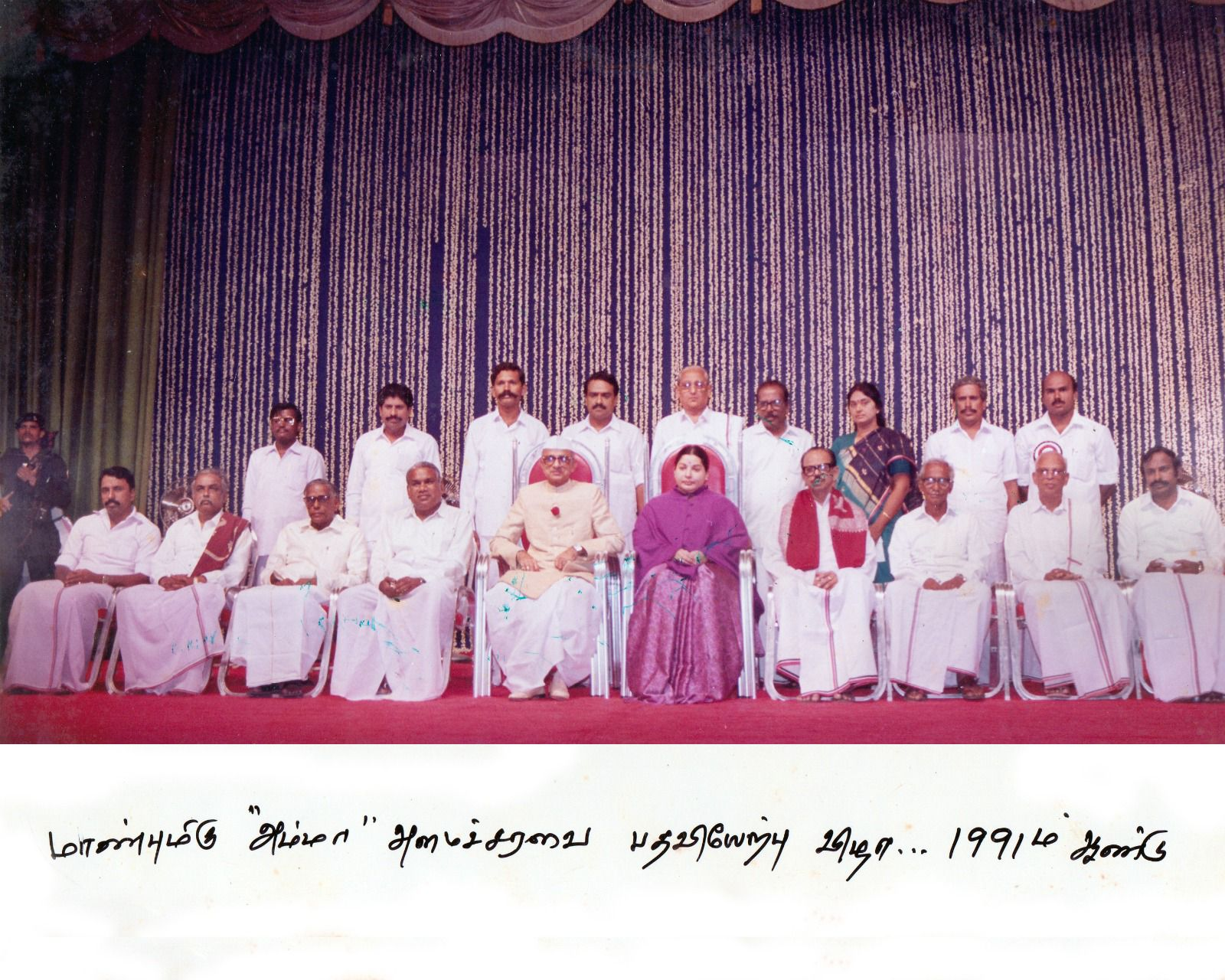
Swearing-in Ceremony of the council of ministers headed by Jayalalithaa on 24 June 1991

On 24 June 1991, Jayalalithaa was sworn in as the chief minister of Tamil Nadu, becoming the second actress to become the chief minister in the Republic of India. She also became the second female chief minister of Tamil Nadu after M.G.R.'s wife, V. N. Janaki Ramachandran. Political observers have ascribed the landslide victory to the anti-incumbent wave arising out of the assassination of the former prime minister by suspected Tamil separatists fighting for a homeland in neighbouring Sri Lanka.

In the 1996 assembly election, the AIADMK-led Alliance suffered a massive rout; the party only won 4 of 234 seats and not even got an opposition status in the assembly. Even the general secretary Jayalalithaa, lost to E. G. Sugavanam of DMK in the Bargur constituency, from where she was elected to become chief minister for her first term. The party also lost all the seats it contested in the 1996 general election. On 3 June 1997, a rebel faction of the AIADMK led by S. Thirunavukkarasar convened a parallel general council meeting in Chennai, where J. Jayalalithaa was expelled from the party and Thirunavukkarasar was declared general secretary. The development followed Jayalalithaa's expulsion of Thirunavukkarasar on 19 May 1997, amid growing dissent within the party after its defeat in the 1996 Tamil Nadu Assembly election, with several leaders rallying behind him and attempting to form a rival faction, including seven of the 14 AIADMK Rajya Sabha members and three of the eight AIADMK MLAs from Tamil Nadu, Puducherry, and Karnataka. Jayalalithaa's own general council meeting, held the same day, reaffirmed her leadership and endorsed his expulsion. The Madras High Court later ruled that the meeting convened by Thirunavukkarasar was illegal and void, as he was not authorised to convene the party's general council against the elected general secretary Jayalalithaa. In the following months, several leaders from the rebel camp returned to the party led by Jayalalithaa.

From 1 January 1998 to 3 January 1998, the conference of the AIADMK Silver Jubilee Celebrations was held in Tirunelveli, led by the general secretary Jayalalithaa, and lakhs of party cadres and supporters attended the event. At the conference, the party virtually launched its general election campaign in Tamil Nadu and Puducherry in the presence of the alliance partners L. K. Advani of the Bharatiya Janata Party (BJP), S. Ramadoss of the Pattali Makkal Katchi (PMK), Subramanian Swamy of the Janata Party (JP), Valappaddy K. Ramamurthy of the Tamizhaga Rajiv Congress (TRC), and Vaiko of the Marumalarchi Dravida Munnetra Kazhagam (MDMK) participated in the conference ahead of the general election that year. During the 1998 general election, the AIADMK-led Alliance won 30 of 40 seats it contested in Tamil Nadu and Puducherry. Sedapatti R. Muthiah, M. Thambidurai, R. K. Kumar, and Kadambur M. R. Janarthanan were the members of parliament from AIADMK who joined the Union Ministry led by Prime Minister Atal Bihari Vajpayee. On 8 April 1999, AIADMK members of parliament resigned from the union ministry, and on 14 April 1999, Jayalalithaa submitted a letter to the president K. R. Narayanan, withdrawing its support for the Vajpayee-led central government, and the president called for a motion of no-confidence to be held in the parliament. On 17 April 1999, Vajpayee lost in a motion of no-confidence called by Jayalalithaa in a single vote, which led to the government's fall. This incident made the entire country look back at Jayalalithaa. In the 1999 general election, the AIADMK allied with the INC and left parties and won 14 of 40 seats it contested in Tamil Nadu and Puducherry.

In the 2001 assembly election, the AIADMK-led Alliance, consisting of the Tamil Maanila Congress (Moopanar) (TMC(M)), the Indian National Congress (INC), the Pattali Makkal Katchi (PMK), and the left parties, won 197 seats to the AIADMK's 132 and regained power. ( In Chennai region, they won 10 out 16 seats) On 14 May 2001, Jayalalithaa was sworn in as chief minister of Tamil Nadu for a second term and became the second chief minister to take oath as a non-contested member in the assembly election after V. N. Janaki Ramachandran. Jayalalithaa was barred from contesting the election because of the conviction in the disproportionate asset case that occurred during her previous tenure. Due to the proceedings in a disproportionate asset case, she was prevented from holding office, so she was compelled to resign from the post. Then she appointed first-time elected member of the legislative assembly O. Panneerselvam as the legislative leader of the party. On 21 September 2001, he was sworn in as the chief minister of Tamil Nadu for the first term. Once the Supreme Court of India overturned her conviction and sentence in the case, Panneerselvam resigned from the post immediately on the morning of 2 March 2002, and on the same evening, Jayalalithaa was sworn in as chief minister for the third term.

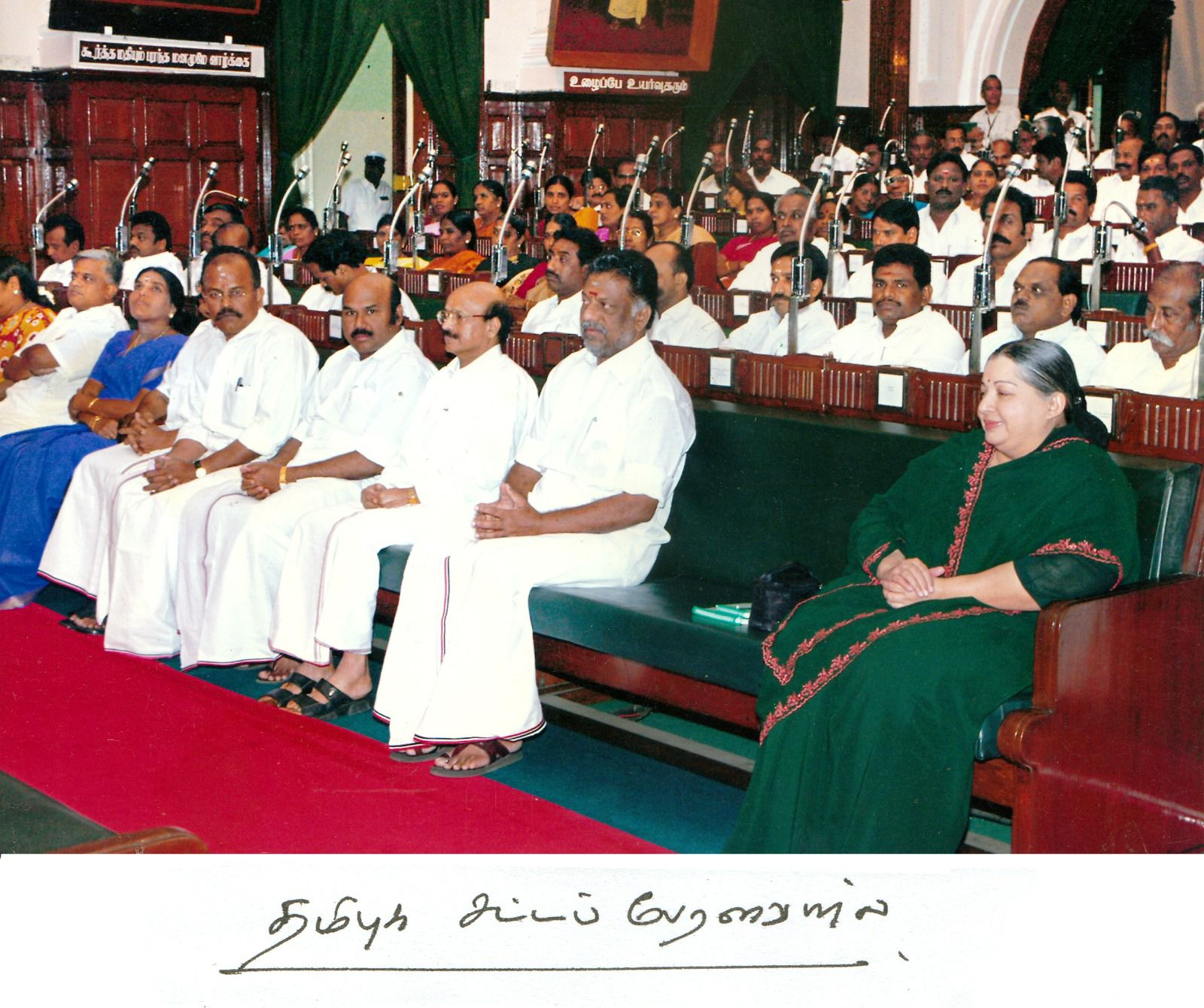
Jayalalithaa along with her council of ministers in the treachery benches of Tamil Nadu Assembly

In Jayalalithaa's second and third terms, she took many popular decisions, such as banning lottery tickets, restricting the liquor and sand quarrying businesses to government agencies, and banning tobacco product sales near schools and colleges. She encouraged women to join the state police force by setting up all-women's police stations and commissioning 150 women into the elite-level police commandos in 2003, a first in India. The women had the same training as men, which included handling weapons, detection and disposal of bombs, driving, horseback riding, and adventure sports. She dispatched a special task force in the name of Operation Cocoon, headed by K. Vijay Kumar and N. K. Senthamarai Kannan, to the Sathyamangalam forests in October 2004 to track down notorious sandalwood smuggler Veerappan. The operation was successful, as the special task force killed him on 18 October 2004.

Despite the popular measures taken by the Jayalalithaa-led government, the AIADMK-led Alliance lost all 40 seats it contested in the 2004 general election. The Democratic Progressive Alliance (DPA), consisting of all the major opposition parties in the state, swept the election.

In the 2006 assembly election, the party contested only with the support of the Marumalarchi Dravida Munnetra Kazhagam (MDMK), Viduthalai Chiruthaigal Katchi (VCK) and a few other smaller parties, winning 69 seats, with the AIADMK winning 61 seats.For the first time, the AIADMK secured 7 of the 14 seats in the DMK stronghold of Chennai City alone in an election widely regarded as lacking a clear wave. The opposition's Democratic Progressive Alliance, comprising larger parties, won 163 seats, with the DMK winning 96 seats; the DMK is back in power but only as a minority government. In the history of Tamil Nadu, it was the first time the state had a hung assembly with a minority government. The AIADMK's electoral reversals continued in the 2009 general election. However, the party's performance was better than its debacle in 2004, and the AIADMK-led Alliance managed to win 12 seats, with the AIADMK winning 9 seats.

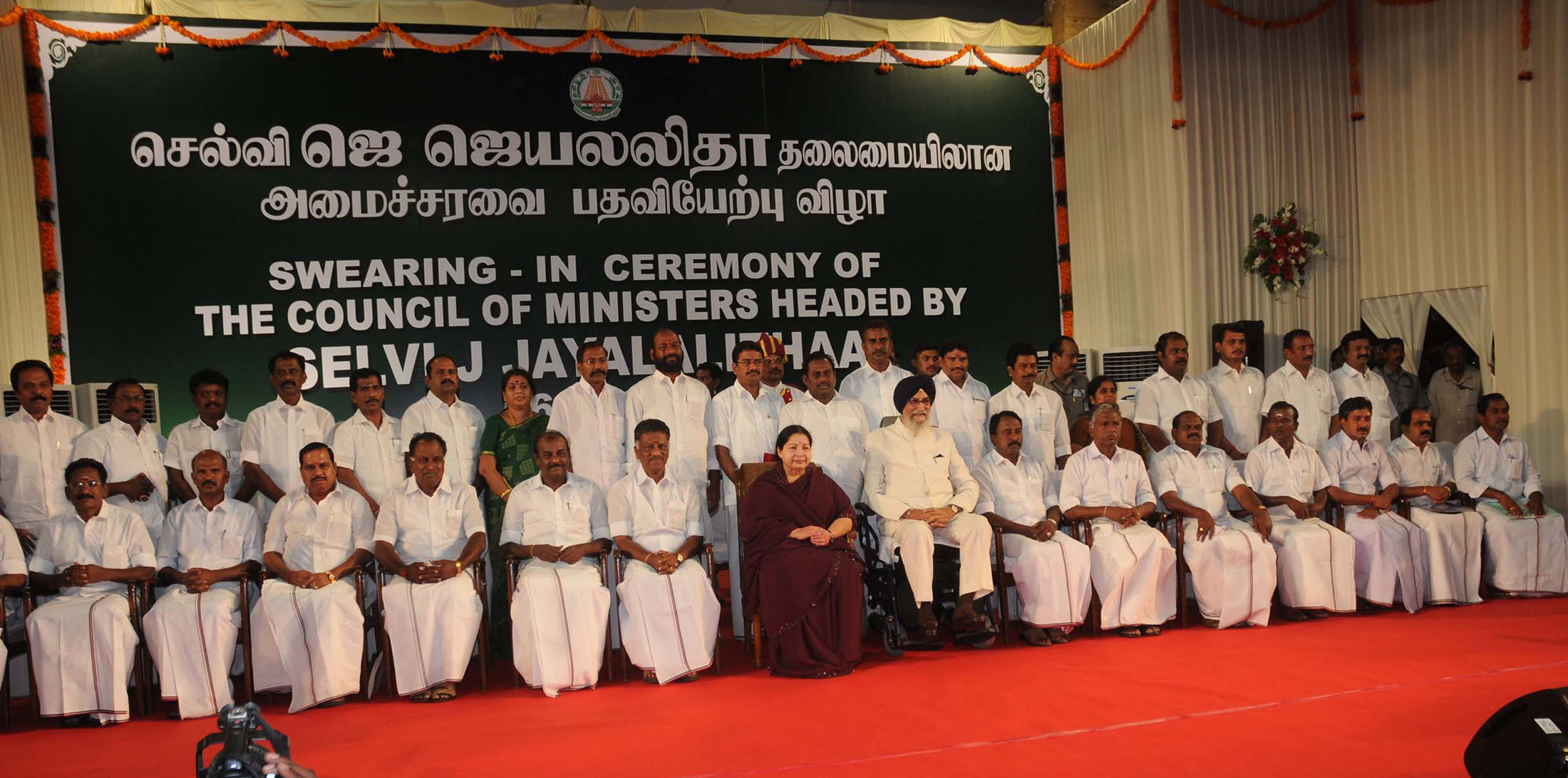
Swearing-in Ceremony of the council of ministers headed by Jayalalithaa on 16 May 2011

Following widespread corruption, a price rise, a power cut, and allegations of nepotism against the DMK government, in the 2011 assembly election, the AIADMK-led Alliance with parties like the left and actor-turned-politician Vijayakant's Desiya Murpokku Dravida Kazhagam (DMDK) swept the polls, winning 203 seats, with the AIADMK winning 150 (they won 14 seats out 16 seats in capital chennai), and on 16 May 2011, Jayalalithaa was sworn in as chief minister of Tamil Nadu for a fourth term. Her return to power marked a significant shift in the state's political landscape, as she implemented various welfare schemes aimed at improving the lives of the underprivileged. These initiatives garnered her considerable support, further solidifying her position in Tamil Nadu politics and effectively challenging the opposition's influence.

In Puducherry, the AIADMK allied with N. Rangasamy's All India N.R. Congress (AINRC) and won the 2011 assembly election, which was held in parallel with the Tamil Nadu assembly election. Rangasamy, on the other hand, formed the government without consulting the AIADMK and refused to share power with the pre-election alliance partner. So Jayalalithaa accused him of betraying the coalition.

On 9 February 2014, the general secretary of the AIADMK and the chief minister of Tamil Nadu Jayalalithaa donated a 13-kg gold armour to adorn the 3.5-foot-tall Pasumpon U. Muthuramalinga Thevar statue at the U. Muthuramalinga Thevar temple in Pasumpon, Ramanathapuram. This armour is kept safely in a locker at the Bank of India's Anna Nagar branch in Madurai. After the AIADMK treasurer signs the bank, the shield will be handed over to the treasurer, who will then hand it over to the temple trustees from October 28 to 30, which is the Guru Pooja and Thevar Jayanthi observed on October 30 every year.

The AIADMK's electoral performance continued to be excellent in the 2014 general election as well. It opted not to join any alliance and contested all seats in the state of Tamil Nadu and the union territory of Puducherry on its own. The party won an unprecedented 37 out of the 40 parliamentary constituencies it contested and emerged as the third largest party in the 16th Lok Sabha of the Indian Parliament. It was a massive victory that no other regional political party had ever achieved in the history of general elections.

On 29 August 2014, the chief minister of Tamil Nadu Jayalalithaa was elected as the general secretary of the party for the 7th consecutive term, making her the longest-serving general secretary of the party to date. Earlier, she was elected as general secretary on 1 January 1988, 9 February 1989, 23 June 1993, 23 September 1998, 10 September 2003, and 10 September 2008. During her longest tenure as general secretary, E. V. A. Vallimuthu, V. R. Nedunchezhiyan, K. Kalimuthu, Pulamaipithan, C. Ponnaiyan, and E. Madhusudhanan served as the presidium chairmen of the party.

On 27 September 2014, the chief minister of Tamil Nadu Jayalalithaa was convicted in the disproportionate assets case by a special court along with her associates V. K. Sasikala, Ilavarasi, and V. N. Sudhakaran and sentenced to four years' simple imprisonment. Jayalalithaa was also fined ₹100 crore, and her associates were fined ₹10 crore each. The case had political implications, as it was the first time a ruling chief minister had to step down on account of a court sentence.

Due to Jayalalithaa's dismissal, the minister for finance and public works of Tamil Nadu Panneerselvam was sworn in as chief minister of Tamil Nadu for a second term on 29 September 2014. Bail for Jayalalithaa was denied by the High Court and then moved to the Supreme Court, where it was granted on 17 October 2014. On 11 May 2015, the High Court of Karnataka said she was acquitted from that case, and on 23 May 2015, Jayalalithaa was sworn in as chief minister of Tamil Nadu for a fifth term.

In the 2016 assembly election, the chief minister of Tamil Nadu Jayalalithaa ran without allies and swept the polls by winning 135 of 234 seats. It was the most audacious decision taken by her for the spectacular victory that any political leader had ever made in the history of Tamil Nadu elections. On 23 May 2016, Jayalalithaa was sworn in as chief minister of Tamil Nadu for a sixth and last term.

On 22 September 2016, she was admitted to Apollo Hospital, Chennai, due to fever and dehydration. After a prolonged illness, she died on 5 December 2016 and became the third chief minister in Tamil Nadu to die in office after Anna and her mentor M. G. R.

Following her death, a robbery and murder took place at Jayalalithaa's Kodanadu estate on 24 April 2017. The incident later became a politically sensitive issue within the AIADMK and among the public.

==== Expansion beyond Tamil Nadu and Puducherry ====
Under the leadership of Jayalalithaa, the party spread beyond Tamil Nadu and Puducherry. It established state units in some other Indian states and union territories, like the Andaman and Nicobar Islands, Andhra Pradesh, Karnataka, Kerala, Maharashtra, the National Capital Territory of Delhi, and Telangana. The party also has functionaries and supporters in other countries where Tamil people are present.

In Karnataka, the party had members in the state assembly from 1983 to 2004 and has influence in the Tamil-speaking areas of Bengaluru and Kolar. In Kerala, the party won a total of six wards in three panchayats in the local body elections.

In Andhra Pradesh, Kerala, and Maharashtra, the party has contested some legislative assembly elections but did not win a single seat in any of the elections.

=== Post J. Jayalalithaa era (2016–2022) ===
After Jayalalithaa's death on 5 December 2016, her close aide V. K. Sasikala was selected unanimously as the Acting General Secretary of the party on 31 December 2016.

==== Succession struggle between V. K. Sasikala and O. Panneerselvam ====
On 5 February 2017, Sasikala was selected as the leader of the legislative assembly as chief minister. O. Panneerselvam rebelled against Sasikala and reported that he had been compelled to resign as Chief Minister, bringing in a new twist to Tamil Nadu politics. Due to a conviction in the disproportionate assets case against Jayalalithaa, Sasikala was sentenced to 4 years' imprisonment in the Bengaluru Central Prison. Before that, she appointed Edappadi K. Palaniswami as legislative party leader (Chief Minister).

She also appointed her nephew and former treasurer of the party, T. T. V. Dhinakaran, as the deputy general secretary of the AIADMK party. With the support of 123 MLAs, Palaniswami became chief minister of Tamil Nadu.

On 23 March 2017, the Election Commission of India (ECI) gave separate party symbols to the two factions: O. Panneerselvam's faction, known as AIADMK (Puratchi Thalaivi Amma), got the "Electric Pole" symbol, and Edappadi K. Palaniswami's faction, known as AIADMK (Amma), got the "Hat" symbol.

==== Leadership conflict between T. T. V. Dhinakaran and Edappadi K. Palaniswami ====
A bye-election was announced for the Dr. Radhakrishnan Nagar constituency, which was vacated due to Jayalalithaa's death. But the election commission cancelled the bye-election after evidence of large-scale bribery by the ruling AIADMK (Amma) surfaced. On 17 April 2017, Delhi police registered a case against Dhinakaran, who was also the candidate for AIADMK (Amma) for the bye-election at Dr. Radhakrishnan Nagar, regarding an allegation of attempting to bribe the Election Commission of India for the AIADMK's election symbol. However, the Central District Tis Hazari Courts granted him bail on the grounds that the police had failed to identify the allegedly bribed public official.

However, the chief minister, Edappadi K. Palaniswami, had a fallout with Dhinakaran and announced that the appointment of Dhinakaran as deputy general secretary was invalid. So he claims, "We are the real AIADMK, and 95% of its cadres are with us."

==== Expulsion of V. K. Sasikala and T. T. V. Dhinakaran ====
On 12 September 2017, the AIADMK general council, which had earlier appointed her, cancelled V. K. Sasikala's appointment as general secretary and officially expelled her from the party as a primary member.

Earlier on 10 August 2017, T. T. V. Dhinakaran was sacked as deputy general secretary at the meeting headed by Edappadi K. Palaniswami at Puratchi Thalaivar M. G. R. Maaligai in Chennai.

After completing her imprisonment at Bengaluru Central Prison, Sasikala filed a case in the City Civil Court IV of Chennai in February 2021, but it upheld her dismissal as the AIADMK general secretary in April 2022. On 5 December 2023, the Madras High Court upheld her dismissal as the AIADMK general secretary. On 24 February 2026, Sasikala launched a New Political Party and Its Flag, thereby effectively giving away her claim over the AIADMK ahead of Tamil Nadu Assembly Elections.

==== Return of O. Panneerselvam ====
On 21 August 2017, both O. Panneerselvam and Edappadi K. Palaniswami factions of the AIADMK merged, and O. Panneerselvam was sworn in as the Deputy Chief Minister of Tamil Nadu with the portfolio of Finance. He also holds portfolios for housing, rural housing, housing development, the slum clearance board, accommodation control, town planning, urban development, and the Chennai Metropolitan Development Authority. A dual leadership system was amended in the constitution of the party by removing the designation of general secretary and constituting the new designations for the party's leadership. O. Panneerselvam and Edappadi K. Palaniswami became the coordinator and joint coordinator of the AIADMK, respectively. On 4 January 2018, O. Panneerselvam was elected Leader of the House in the Tamil Nadu Legislative Assembly.

On 12 September 2017, the AIADMK general council decided to cancel V. K. Sasikala's appointment as acting general secretary and officially expel her from the party, though prominent members appointed to party posts by her were allowed to continue discharging their functions. Instead, the late J. Jayalalithaa was named the eternal general secretary of the AIADMK.

A day after the merger of two AIADMK factions, on 22 August 2017, 19 MLAs owing allegiance to ousted deputy general secretary T. T. V. Dhinakaran submitted letters to the governor, expressing lack of confidence in Chief Minister Edappadi K. Palaniswami and withdrawing support from the government. 18 out of those 19 MLAs were disqualified from office by the Speaker of the legislative assembly upon recommendation from the AIADMK Chief Whip. After a prolonged legal battle, the Speaker's orders were upheld by the Madras High Court, and bye-elections were held alongside the general parliamentary elections. On 23 November 2017, the Election Commission of India granted the "two leaves" symbol to the O. Panneerselvam and Edappadi K. Palaniswami camp.

On 24 February 2018, AIADMK's new mouthpiece, Namadhu Amma, a Tamil daily newspaper, was launched, marking the 70th birth anniversary of the former chief minister of Tamil Nadu and the former general secretary of AIADMK, J. Jayalalithaa, fondly known as Amma. On 14 November 2018, the AIADMK launched News J, named after the AIADMK former general secretary J. Jayalalithaa, to replace Jaya TV. News J is the 24×7 Tamil news channel operated and managed by Mantaro Network Private Limited.

Despite the popular measures taken by the government, in the 2019 Lok Sabha election, the party, in alliance with the BJP again, was humiliated, winning one of the 39 Lok Sabha seats from the state. The Secular Progressive Alliance (SPA), a DMK-led alliance consisting of all the major opposition parties in the state, swept the election by winning 38 seats.

In August 2020, there was a bustle in the party over the selection of the chief ministerial candidate. On 7 October 2020, the party coordinator and the deputy chief minister of Tamil Nadu O. Panneerselvam announced that the joint coordinator and the chief minister of Tamil Nadu Edappadi K. Palaniswami, would be the chief ministerial candidate for the upcoming 2021 assembly election.

In the 2021 assembly election, the AIADMK-led Alliance, consisting of the PMK, BJP, and a few other smaller parties, won 75 seats compared to the 159 seats won by the DMK-led Secular Progressive Alliance, which made the DMK form a majority government after the victory of the 1996 assembly election. After the election, the AIADMK emerged as the main opposition party in the assembly by winning 66 seats. On 10 May 2021, party joint coordinator Edappadi K. Palaniswami was unanimously elected as the leader of the opposition in the Tamil Nadu Legislative Assembly and on 14 June 2021, party coordinator O. Panneerselvam was elected as the deputy leader of the opposition in the Tamil Nadu Legislative Assembly.

On 15 October 2021, party coordinator O. Panneerselvam and joint coordinator Edappadi K. Palaniswami jointly released the notification stating that the headquarters of the party, which is located at V.P. Raman Salai, Royapettah, Chennai, will be named Puratchi Thalaivar M.G.R. Maaligai in memory of the party's founder and the former chief minister of Tamil Nadu M. G. Ramachandran. In December 2021, they both re-elected as co-ordinator and joint co-ordinator respectively.

==== Legal fight for the party by V. K. Sasikala and T. T. V. Dhinakaran ====
After that, V. K. Sasikala and T. T. V. Dhinakaran had appealed to the Delhi High Court, which rejected their appeal and said that O. Panneerselvam and Edappadi K. Palaniswami were the original AIADMK.

Following that, T. T. V. Dhinakaran filed an appeal with the Supreme Court of India on March 15, and the bench of the Chief Justice of India dismissed his appeal against the Delhi High Court's decision in favor of the O. Panneerselvam and Edappadi K. Palaniswami camp.

Following this, the General Council passed a resolution removing V. K. Sasikala from the post of General Secretary. V. K. Sasikala and T. T. V. Dhinakaran jointly filed a suit in the High Court challenging the decision of the General Council. Since it was a civil case, the case was transferred to the City Civil Court. During the hearing on 9 April 2021, Dinakaran told the court that he would withdraw from the case as he had started a party called Amma Makkal Munnettra Kazagam. At the same time, Sasikala told the court that she wanted to continue the case. The court dismissed her plea following an interlocutory application from AIADMK coordinator O. Panneerselvam and joint coordinator Edappadi K. Palaniswami.

==== Tensions with BJP ====
In June 2022, the AIADMK and BJP were at odds publicly. AIADMK organization secretary C. Ponnaiyan accused the BJP-led central government of stealing Tamil Nadu's revenue, as well as blaming AIADMK for election losses, the loss of minority community support, and "anti-Tamil" policies, particularly those affecting students. He also called the alliance an "electoral adjustment", claiming that the BJP was attempting to expand at the cost of the AIADMK in Tamil Nadu and that its ideology is diametrically opposite that of the AIADMK. The event reportedly had party cadres reiterating these sentiments, albeit in a lighter tone, and agreeing that the BJP was attempting to wrest control of the state's opposition from the AIADMK.

==== Conflict between V. K. Sasikala and T. T. V. Dhinakaran ====
T. T. V. Dhinakaran launched Amma Makkal Munnettra Kazhagam (AMMK) in March 2018 as an unregistered party, with V. K. Sasikala as its general-secretary. Dhinakaran replaced her in April 2019, after registering the party. Following disgreements with him, Sasikala quit AMMK, which entered an alliance with the Palaniswami-led AIADMK. She then joined a party founded by her supporters, the All India Puratchi Thalaivar Makkal Munnetra Kazhagam (AIPTMMK), in March 2026.

==== Leadership tussle between O. Panneerselvam and Edappadi K. Palaniswami ====
On 14 June 2022, citing the party's troubles in the polls, AIADMK district secretaries and other senior party members spoke out to shun the "dual leadership" system and came out publicly in favor of a strong unitary leader to strengthen the organization.

Supporters of Edappadi K. Palaniswami pushed for the change in the party's leadership structure by staging a political coup against AIADMK coordinator O. Panneerselvam, who had become weak within the party. According to many sources, of the AIADMK's 75 district secretaries, hardly 10 supported him. Of the party's 66 MLAs, only three were reportedly on O. Panneerselvam's side, and less than 20 percent of the party's general council members were behind him ahead of the crucial general council meeting on 23 June 2022, which was expected to elect the single leadership to the party.

On 23 June 2022, A. Thamizhmahan Hussain was unanimously elected as the Presidium Chairman of the party at a general council meeting held at the Shrivaaru Venkataachalapathy Palace in Vanagaram, Chennai. On the same day, Presidium Chairman A. Thamizhmahan Hussain announced that the next general council meeting of the party would be held on 11 July 2022.

On 30 June 2022, Edappadi K. Palaniswami wrote a letter to O. Panneerselvam asserting the latter ceased to be the party coordinator as the amendments made to the party's bylaw in the December 2021 executive committee meeting were not recognized in the general council meeting held on 23 June 2022.

==== Expulsion of O. Panneerselvam ====
In the general council meeting held on 11 July 2022, the general council members passed the resolution and expelled the former coordinator O. Panneerselvam, the former deputy coordinator R. Vaithilingam, P. H. Manoj Pandian, and J. C. D. Prabhakar from their respective posts and primary membership in the party for "anti-party" activities.

On 11 July 2022, former chief minister of Tamil Nadu Edappadi K. Palaniswami was unanimously elected as the interim general secretary of the party in the general council meeting held at the Shrivaaru Venkatachalapathy Palace in Vanagaram, Chennai. Palaniswami appointed Dindigul C. Sreenivasan as the treasurer of the party, replacing O. Panneerselvam. On 19 July 2022, Palaniswami appointed R. B. Udhayakumar as the deputy leader of the opposition in the Tamil Nadu Legislative Assembly, replacing Panneerselvam, who declared this in the party's legislative members meeting held on 17 July 2022. Before the general council meeting, there was violence at the Puratchi Thalaivar M. G. R. Maaligai in Royapettah, where the supporters of Palaniswami and Panneerselvam threw stones, bottles, and plastic chairs at each other and damaged several vehicles nearby. Following this, the Revenue Department of Tamil Nadu sealed the Puratchi Thalaivar M.G.R. Maaligai for the third time in its history. Overall, 47 people were injured in the clashes.

On 20 July 2022, the Madras High Court ordered to remove the seal of Puratchi Thalaivar M. G. R. Maaligai and hand over the keys to the interim general secretary, Edappadi K. Palaniswami. It was previously locked and sealed on 11 July 2022. On 12 September 2022, the Supreme Court of India dismissed the petition of O. Panneerselvam challenging the Madras High Court's order to handover the keys to Palaniswami.

==== Legal fight for the party between Edappadi K. Palaniswami and O. Panneerselvam ====
The Madras High Court on 17 August 2022 ruled in favor of O. Panneerselvam and declared the AIADMK general council meeting held on 11 July 2022 which had abolished dual leadership as void ab initio. The court called for the restoration of the status quo as it existed on June 23 and has prevented the party from convening any meeting of the executive council or the general council of the party without joint consent from both Palaniswami and Panneerselvam, thus effectively restoring dual leadership. The court cited procedural lapses to declare the general council meeting held on July 11, invalid and found that there was no data to prove Edappadi K. Palaniswami's claim that 95% of the 1.5 crore (15 million) primary party members supported unitary leadership under him.

Edappadi K. Palaniswami appealed the single-judge court order to a larger bench of judges. Following the order, O. Panneerselvam appealed for party unity, which included the splinter AMMK group. Palaniswami dismissed this appeal as a power-hungry move by Panneerselvam and held him responsible for violence at the Puratchi Thalaivar M.G.R. Maaligai.

On 2 September 2022, a division bench of the Madras High Court upheld the decisions of the AIADMK general council meeting held on 11 July 2022, and set aside the previous court order of the single judge in the appeal case of Edappadi K. Palaniswami, thus effectively restoring unitary leadership.

On 23 February 2023, the Supreme Court of India upheld the decisions of the AIADMK general council meeting held on 11 July 2022, and dismissed the petition of O. Panneerselvam challenging the previous order of the division bench, thus affirming unitary leadership under Edappadi K. Palaniswami. On 19 January 2024, the Supreme Court of India refused to stay the August 2023 order of the division bench of Madras High Court, which dismissed the petitions of O. Panneerselvam challenging resolutions passed by the general council held on 11 July 2022, that led to the expulsion of O. Panneerselvam and his supporters from the party, saying the interference at this stage will "lead to huge chaos". On 27 February 2026, O. Panneerselvam joined the DMK in the presence of Its President M. K. Stalin, thereby effectively relinquishing his claim over the AIADMK ahead of Tamil Nadu Assembly Elections.

=== Edappadi K. Palaniswami era (2022–present) ===
On 11 July 2022, an AIADMK general council meeting was held at the Shrivaaru Venkataachalapathy Palace in Vanagaram following the dismissal of a petition by O. Panneerselvam in the Madras High Court. The party general council abolished the dual leadership model, empowered Edappadi K. Palaniswami as the party's interim general secretary, and called for organizational elections in 4 months. The general council meeting made 20 amendments to the party bylaws, including the removal of rule 20, which had described the former general secretary J. Jayalalithaa as the "eternal general secretary"; reviving the post of general secretary; transferring all the powers of the coordinator and joint coordinator to the general secretary; and abolishing the posts of coordinator and joint coordinator. These changes in the bylaws effectively ended the dual leadership of the party.

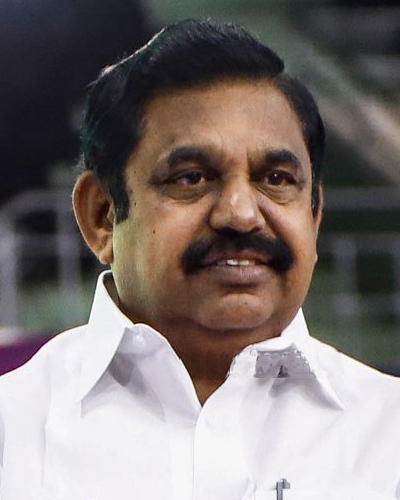
Edappadi K. Palaniswami serves as the general secretary of the party since July 2022

On 28 March 2023, the Madras High Court ruled in favour of Edappadi K. Palaniswami and dismissed the petitions of O. Panneerselvam challenging the resolutions passed at the general council meeting held on 11 July 2022. On the same day, the electoral officers announced that Edappadi K. Palaniswami was elected as the general secretary of the party.

On 20 April 2023, the Election Commission of India recognised Edappadi K. Palaniswami as the general secretary of the party, acknowledging the amendments to the party constitution and changes to the list of office-bearers. On 10 July 2023, the Election Commission of India recognised the changes made in the party organisation after the party's due election.

On 20 August 2023, the Rising Conference of the AIADMK Golden Jubilee Celebrations was held in Madurai, led by the newly elected general secretary Edappadi K. Palaniswami, and lakhs of party cadres and supporters attended the event.

On 25 September 2023, the party's secretaries advisory meeting, led by general secretary Edappadi K. Palaniswami, was held in the Puratchi Thalaivar M. G. R. Maaligai. At the meeting, it was decided to withdraw from the Bharatiya Janata Party-led National Democratic Alliance, and it was officially announced by deputy general secretary K. P. Munusamy after the meeting.

In the 2024 general election, the AIADMK-led Alliance consisting of Desiya Murpokku Dravida Kazhagam (DMDK), Puthiya Tamilagam (PT), and the Social Democratic Party of India (SDPI) contested in the state of Tamil Nadu and the union territories of Puducherry and Andaman and Nicobar Islands for the 18th Lok Sabha polls. In the alliance, the AIADMK contested 36 constituencies, and the DMDK contested five constituencies. The party-led alliance lost in all the constituencies it contested, and the Indian National Developmental Inclusive Alliance swept the election in Tamil Nadu and Puducherry.

On 19 January 2025, Edappadi K. Palaniswami announced the formation of the "AIADMK Young Generation Sports Wing" to encourage sportspersons. On 10 February 2025, AIADMK general secretary Edappadi K. Palaniswami virtually inaugurated the newly constructed party office located at Sector-VI, Pushp Vihar, M. B. Road, New Delhi, in the presence of the prominent members and secretaries of the party. The three-storey office building in the National Capital Territory of Delhi is named Puratchi Thalaivar M. G. R. – Puratchi Thalaivi Amma Maaligai in memory of the party's leaders and the former chief ministers of Tamil Nadu M. G. Ramachandran and J. Jayalalithaa. On 11 April 2025, AIADMK General Secretary Edappadi K. Palaniswami and BJP leader and The Union Home Minister Amit Shah announced their alliance for 2026 TN Assembly election on a Joint Press Conference at Chennai.

On 31 October 2025, AIADMK General Secretary Edappadi K. Palaniswami expelled senior leader and Gobichettipalayam MLA K. A. Sengottaiyan from the party. Palaniswami stated that Sengottaiyan had accompanied expelled leader O. Panneerselvam and AMMK founder T. T. V. Dhinakaran in the same car and participated in a joint press conference at Pasumpon during the Tevar Jayanthi ceremony. Earlier on 5 September 2025, Sengottaiyan urged party general secretary Palaniswami to take steps to reunite expelled and dissenting leaders to restore the party's strength ahead of the 2026 Tamil Nadu Assembly election. In January 2026, AIADMK formed an alliance with former partner PMK and long-time rival of the T. T. V. Dhinakaran-led AMMK.

==== Short-lived rebellion led by C. V. Shanmugam and S. P. Velumani ====
In the 2026 assembly election, the AIADMK-led Alliance, consisting of the BJP, PMK, T. T. V. Dhinakaran-led-AMMK, TMC(M) and a few other smaller parties, won 53 seats with AIADMK winning only 47 seats and lost its official opposition status to the DMK which won 59 seats as part of Secular Progressive Alliance. After losing the polls with an even smaller seat tally, a group of 25 rebel MLAs decided to reject Edappadi K. Palaniswami as their leader, splintering the party into 2 factions, with only 22 supporting Palaniswami as their legislative party leader. The rebel faction suffered a setback after four MLAs resigned from the Assembly and joined TVK, while several others returned to the EPS camp to avoid disqualification under the anti-defection law. They submitted apology letters to the Speaker and party general secretary Edappadi K. Palaniswami for defying the party whip during the floor test. As the rebel camp’s strength fell from 25 to 15 MLAs, reconciliation talks gained momentum. on 27 May 2026, Rebel leaders led by S. P. Velumani later met Palaniswami and declared him as their leader, reaffirming EPS's hold over the party.

== Electoral performance ==
=== Indian general elections ===
Lok Sabha Elections
| Year | Lok Sabha | Party leader | Seats contested | Seats won | Change in seats | Percentage of votes | Vote swing | Popular vote | Outcome |
|---|---|---|---|---|---|---|---|---|---|
| 1977 | 6th | M. G. Ramachandran | 21 | 18 / 542 | ▲18 | 2.90% | Steady | 5,480,378 | Government |
| 1980 | 7th | M. G. Ramachandran | 24 | 2 / 529 | ▼16 | 2.36% | ▼0.54% | 4,674,064 | Opposition |
| 1984 | 8th | M. G. Ramachandran | 12 | 12 / 541 | ▲10 | 1.69% | ▼0.67% | 3,968,967 | Government |
| 1989 | 9th | J. Jayalalithaa | 11 | 11 / 529 | ▼1 | 1.50% | ▼0.19% | 4,518,649 | Opposition |
| 1991 | 10th | J. Jayalalithaa | 11 | 11 / 534 | Steady | 1.62% | ▲0.12% | 4,470,542 | Government |
| 1996 | 11th | J. Jayalalithaa | 10 | 0 / 543 | ▼11 | 0.64% | ▼0.98% | 2,130,286 | Lost |
| 1998 | 12th | J. Jayalalithaa | 23 | 18 / 543 | ▲18 | 1.83% | ▲1.19% | 6,731,550 | Government |
| 1999 | 13th | J. Jayalalithaa | 29 | 10 / 543 | ▼8 | 1.93% | ▲0.10% | 7,046,953 | Opposition |
| 2004 | 14th | J. Jayalalithaa | 33 | 0 / 543 | ▼10 | 2.19% | ▲0.26% | 8,547,014 | Lost |
| 2009 | 15th | J. Jayalalithaa | 23 | 9 / 543 | ▲9 | 1.67% | ▼0.52% | 6,953,591 | Others |
| 2014 | 16th | J. Jayalalithaa | 40 | 37 / 543 | ▲28 | 3.31% | ▲1.64% | 18,111,579 | Others |
| 2019 | 17th | O. Panneerselvam and Edappadi K. Palaniswami | 22 | 1 / 543 | ▼36 | 1.37% | ▼1.94% | 8,307,345 | Government |
| 2024 | 18th | Edappadi K. Palaniswami | 36 | 0 / 543 | ▼1 | 1.39% | ▲0.02% | 8,952,587 | Lost |

=== State legislative assembly elections ===
Tamil Nadu Legislative Assembly Elections
| Year | Assembly | Party leader | Seats contested | Seats won | Change in seats | Percentage of votes | Vote swing | Popular vote | Outcome |
|---|---|---|---|---|---|---|---|---|---|
| 1977 | 6th | M. G. Ramachandran | 200 | 130 / 234 | ▲130 | 30.36% | Steady | 5,194,876 | Government |
| 1980 | 7th | M. G. Ramachandran | 177 | 129 / 234 | ▼1 | 38.75% | ▲8.39% | 7,303,010 | Government |
| 1984 | 8th | M. G. Ramachandran | 155 | 132 / 234 | ▲3 | 37.03% | ▼1.72% | 8,030,809 | Government |
| 1989 | 9th | J. Jayalalithaa | 202 | 29 / 234 | ▼103 | 21.77% | ▼15.26% | 5,247,317 | Opposition |
| 1991 | 10th | J. Jayalalithaa | 168 | 164 / 234 | ▲135 | 44.39% | ▲22.62% | 10,940,966 | Government |
| 1996 | 11th | J. Jayalalithaa | 168 | 4 / 234 | ▼160 | 21.47% | ▼22.92% | 5,831,383 | Others |
| 2001 | 12th | J. Jayalalithaa | 141 | 132 / 234 | ▲128 | 31.44% | ▲9.97% | 8,815,387 | Government |
| 2006 | 13th | J. Jayalalithaa | 188 | 61 / 234 | ▼71 | 32.64% | ▲1.20% | 10,768,559 | Opposition |
| 2011 | 14th | J. Jayalalithaa | 165 | 150 / 234 | ▲89 | 38.40% | ▲5.76% | 14,150,289 | Government |
| 2016 | 15th | J. Jayalalithaa | 234 | 136 / 234 | ▼14 | 41.06% | ▲2.66% | 17,806,490 | Government |
| 2021 | 16th | O. Panneerselvam and Edappadi K. Palaniswami | 191 | 66 / 234 | ▼70 | 33.29% | ▼7.77% | 15,391,055 | Opposition |
| 2026 | 17th | Edappadi K. Palaniswami | 172 | 47 / 234 | ▼19 | 21.21% | ▼12.08% | 10,462,146 | Others |

Puducherry Legislative Assembly Elections
| Year | Assembly | Party leader | Seats contested | Seats won | Change in seats | Percentage of votes | Vote swing | Popular vote | Outcome |
|---|---|---|---|---|---|---|---|---|---|
| 1974 | 4th | M. G. Ramachandran | 21 | 12 / 30 | ▲12 | 27.83% | Steady | 60,812 | Government |
| 1977 | 5th | M. G. Ramachandran | 27 | 14 / 30 | ▲2 | 30.96% | ▲3.13% | 69,873 | Government |
| 1980 | 6th | M. G. Ramachandran | 18 | 0 / 30 | ▼14 | 18.60% | ▼12.36% | 45,623 | Lost |
| 1985 | 7th | M. G. Ramachandran | 10 | 6 / 30 | ▲6 | 15.75% | ▼2.85% | 47,521 | Opposition |
| 1990 | 8th | J. Jayalalithaa | 13 | 3 / 30 | ▼3 | 18.17% | ▲2.42% | 76,337 | Opposition |
| 1991 | 9th | J. Jayalalithaa | 10 | 6 / 30 | ▲3 | 17.34% | ▼0.83% | 67,792 | Opposition |
| 1996 | 10th | J. Jayalalithaa | 10 | 3 / 30 | ▼3 | 12.53% | ▼4.81% | 57,678 | Opposition |
| 2001 | 11th | J. Jayalalithaa | 20 | 3 / 30 | Steady | 12.56% | ▲0.03% | 59,926 | Government |
| 2006 | 12th | J. Jayalalithaa | 18 | 3 / 30 | Steady | 16.04% | ▲3.48% | 90,699 | Others |
| 2011 | 13th | J. Jayalalithaa | 10 | 5 / 30 | ▲2 | 13.75% | ▼2.29% | 95,960 | Others |
| 2016 | 14th | J. Jayalalithaa | 30 | 4 / 30 | ▼1 | 16.82% | ▲3.07% | 134,597 | Others |
| 2021 | 15th | O. Panneerselvam and Edappadi K. Palaniswami | 5 | 0 / 30 | ▼4 | 4.14% | ▼12.68% | 34,623 | Lost |
| 2026 | 16th | Edappadi K. Palaniswami | 2 | 1 / 30 | ▲1 | 1.09% | ▼3.05% | 9,399 | Government |

Karnataka Legislative Assembly Elections
| Year | Assembly | Party leader | Seats contested | Seats won | Change in seats | Percentage of votes | Vote swing | Popular vote | Outcome |
|---|---|---|---|---|---|---|---|---|---|
| 1978 | 6th | M. G. Ramachandran | 7 | 0 / 224 | Steady | 0.18% | Steady | 22,310 | Lost |
| 1983 | 7th | M. G. Ramachandran | 1 | 1 / 224 | ▲1 | 0.13% | ▼0.05% | 16,234 | Opposition |
| 1989 | 9th | J. Jayalalithaa | 1 | 1 / 224 | Steady | 0.18% | ▲0.05% | 32,928 | Government |
| 1994 | 10th | J. Jayalalithaa | 4 | 1 / 224 | Steady | 0.24% | ▲0.06% | 50,696 | Opposition |
| 1999 | 11th | J. Jayalalithaa | 13 | 1 / 224 | Steady | 0.18% | ▼0.06% | 39,865 | Government |
| 2004 | 12th | J. Jayalalithaa | 2 | 0 / 224 | ▼1 | 0.07% | ▼0.11% | 16,737 | Lost |
| 2008 | 13th | J. Jayalalithaa | 7 | 0 / 224 | Steady | 0.03% | ▼0.04% | 9,088 | Lost |
| 2013 | 14th | J. Jayalalithaa | 5 | 0 / 224 | Steady | 0.03% | Steady | 10,280 | Lost |
| 2018 | 15th | O. Panneerselvam and Edappadi K. Palaniswami | 3 | 0 / 224 | Steady | 0.01% | ▼0.02% | 2,072 | Lost |

Keralam Legislative Assembly Elections
| Year | Assembly | Party leader | Seats contested | Seats won | Change in seats | Percentage of votes | Vote swing | Popular vote | Outcome |
|---|---|---|---|---|---|---|---|---|---|
| 1977 | 5th | M. G. Ramachandran | 2 | 0 / 140 | Steady | 0.02% | Steady | 2,114 | Lost |
| 1980 | 6th | M. G. Ramachandran | 1 | 0 / 140 | Steady | 0.00% | ▼0.02% | 224 | Lost |
| 2006 | 12th | J. Jayalalithaa | 29 | 0 / 140 | Steady | 0.12% | ▲0.12% | 19,078 | Lost |
| 2011 | 13th | J. Jayalalithaa | 4 | 0 / 140 | Steady | 0.01% | ▼0.11% | 2,448 | Lost |
| 2016 | 14th | J. Jayalalithaa | 7 | 0 / 140 | Steady | 0.17% | ▲0.16% | 33,440 | Lost |
| 2021 | 15th | O. Panneerselvam and Edappadi K. Palaniswami | 1 | 0 / 140 | Steady | 0.05% | ▼0.12% | 10,376 | Lost |

Andhra Pradesh Legislative Assembly Elections
| Year | Assembly | Party leader | Seats contested | Seats won | Change in seats | Percentage of votes | Vote swing | Popular vote | Outcome |
|---|---|---|---|---|---|---|---|---|---|
| 1978 | 6th | M. G. Ramachandran | 9 | 0 / 294 | Steady | 0.19% | Steady | 38,691 | Lost |
| 1994 | 10th | J. Jayalalithaa | 2 | 0 / 294 | Steady | 0.05% | ▼0.14% | 14,251 | Lost |
| 1999 | 11th | J. Jayalalithaa | 5 | 0 / 294 | Steady | 0.02% | ▼0.03% | 7,281 | Lost |

Maharashtra Legislative Assembly Elections
| Year | Assembly | Party leader | Seats contested | Seats won | Change in seats | Percentage of votes | Vote swing | Popular vote | Outcome |
|---|---|---|---|---|---|---|---|---|---|
| 1999 | 10th | J. Jayalalithaa | 3 | 0 / 288 | Steady | 0.01% | Steady | 3,711 | Lost |
| 2009 | 12th | J. Jayalalithaa | 2 | 0 / 288 | Steady | 0.01% | Steady | 2,587 | Lost |

== Current office bearers and prominent members ==
| Member | Position in Government | Party Position |
|---|---|---|
| Edappadi K. Palaniswami | Member of the Legislative Assembly from Edappadi; Former Chief Minister of Tamil Nadu; Former Leader of the Opposition in the Tamil Nadu Legislative Assembly | General Secretary |
| A. Thamizhmahan Hussain | Former Chairperson of the Tamil Nadu Waqf Board | Presidium Chairman |
| K. P. Munusamy | Former Member of the Legislative Assembly from Veppanahalli; Former Minister for Labour of Tamil Nadu; Former Member of Parliament, Lok Sabha from Krishnagiri | Deputy General Secretary |
| Dindigul C. Sreenivasan | Former Member of the Legislative Assembly from Dindigul; Former Minister for Forest of Tamil Nadu; Former Member of Parliament, Lok Sabha from Dindigul | Treasurer |
| Natham R. Viswanathan | Member of the Legislative Assembly from Natham; Former Minister for Electricity, Prohibition and Excise of Tamil Nadu | Deputy General Secretary |
| C. Ponnaiyan | Former Minister for Finance of Tamil Nadu; Former Member of the Legislative Assembly from Tiruchengode | All World M.G.R. Manram Secretary |
| M. Thambidurai | Member of Parliament, Rajya Sabha; Former Minister of Law, Justice and Company Affairs of the Republic of India; Former Deputy Speaker of the Lok Sabha | Propaganda Secretary |
| S. P. Velumani | Member of the Legislative Assembly from Thondamuthur; Former Minister for Municipal Administration, Rural Development and Implementation of Special Programme of Tamil Nadu | Headquarters Secretary |
| Pollachi V. Jayaraman | Former Member of the Legislative Assembly from Pollachi; Former Minister for Food and Co-operation of Tamil Nadu; Former Deputy Speaker of the Tamil Nadu legislative assembly | Election Wing Secretary |
| B. Valarmathi | Former Minister for Social Welfare and Puratchi Thalaivar M.G.R. Nutritious Meal Programme of Tamil Nadu; Former Member of the Legislative Assembly from Thousand Lights | Women's Wing Secretary |
| R. B. Udhayakumar | Former Deputy Leader of the Opposition in the Tamil Nadu Legislative Assembly; Former Member of the Legislative Assembly from Thirumangalam; Former Minister for Revenue and Disaster Management of Tamil Nadu | Puratchi Thalaivi Amma Peravai Secretary |
| Agri S. S. Krishnamurthy | Deputy Secretary of the Opposition in the Tamil Nadu Legislative Assembly; Member of the Legislative Assembly from Polur; Former Minister for Agriculture of Tamil Nadu | Agriculture Wing Secretary |
| R. Kamalakannan | Steady | Anna Thozhirsanga Peravai Secretary |
| Singai G. Ramachandran | Steady | Students' Wing Secretary |
| N. R. Sivapathi | Former Minister for Animal Husbandry of Tamil Nadu; Former Member of the Legislative Assembly from Musiri | M.G.R. Youth Wing Secretary |
| S. T. Chellapandian | Former Minister for Labour of Tamil Nadu; Former Member of the Legislative Assembly from Thoothukkudi | Trade Wing Secretary |
| K. Sankaradas | Steady | Unorganised Drivers' Wing Secretary |
| Gayathri Raguram | Steady | Deputy Women's Wing Secretary |
| V. P. B. Paramasivam | Former Member of the Legislative Assembly from Vedasandur | Youth Camps & Young Girls Camps Secretary |
| I. S. Inbadurai | Member of Parliament, Rajya Sabha; Former Member of the Legislative Assembly from Radhapuram | Advocates Wing Secretary |
| S. Abdul Rahim | Former Minister for Backward Classes and Minorities Welfare of Tamil Nadu; Former Member of the Legislative Assembly from Avadi | Minorities Welfare Wing Secretary |
| V. V. R. Raj Satyen | Steady | IT Wing Secretary |

== List of party leaders ==
=== General Secretaries ===
| No. | Portrait | Name (Birth–Death) | Term in office | | |
| No. | Portrait | Name (Birth–Death) | Assumed office | Left office | Time in office |
|---|---|---|---|---|---|
| 1 | | M. G. Ramachandran (1917–1987) | 17 October 1972 | 22 June 1978 | 6 years, 316 days |
| 1 | | M. G. Ramachandran (1917–1987) | 17 October 1986 | 24 December 1987 | 6 years, 316 days |
| 2 | | V. R. Nedunchezhiyan (1920–2000) | 23 June 1978 | 10 June 1980 | 1 year, 353 days |
| 3 | | P. U. Shanmugam (1924–2007) | 11 June 1980 | 13 March 1985 | 4 years, 275 days |
| 4 | | S. Raghavanandam (1917–1999) | 14 March 1985 | 16 October 1986 | 1 year, 216 days |
| 5 | | J. Jayalalithaa (1948–2016) | 1 January 1988 | 5 December 2016 | 28 years, 339 days |
| Acting | | V. K. Sasikala (b. 1954) | 31 December 2016 | 17 February 2017 | 48 days |
| Interim | | Edappadi K. Palaniswami (b. 1954) | 11 July 2022 | 27 March 2023 | 4 years, 134 days |
| 6 | | Edappadi K. Palaniswami (b. 1954) | 28 March 2023 | Incumbent | 4 years, 134 days |

=== Coordinators ===
| No. | Portrait | Name (Birth–Death) | Term in office | | |
| No. | Portrait | Name (Birth–Death) | Assumed office | Left office | Time in office |
|---|---|---|---|---|---|
| 1 | | Coordinator; O. Panneerselvam (b. 1951) | 21 August 2017 | 23 June 2022 | 4 years, 306 days |
| 1 | | Joint Coordinator; Edappadi K. Palaniswami (b. 1954) | 21 August 2017 | 23 June 2022 | 4 years, 306 days |

== Legislative leaders ==
=== List of cabinet ministers of the Union ===
| No. | Portrait | Name (Birth–Death) | Portfolio | Term in office | | | Elected constituency (House) | Prime Minister |
| No. | Portrait | Name (Birth–Death) | Portfolio | Assumed office | Left office | Time in office | Elected constituency (House) | Prime Minister |
|---|---|---|---|---|---|---|---|---|
| 1 | | Sathiavani Muthu (1923–1999) | Ministry of Social Welfare | 19 August 1979 | 23 December 1979 | 126 days | Tamil Nadu (Rajya Sabha) | Charan Singh |
| 2 | | Aravinda Bala Pajanor (1935–2013) | Ministry of Petroleum, Chemicals and Fertilizers | 19 August 1979 | 23 December 1979 | 126 days | Puducherry (Lok Sabha) | Charan Singh |
| 3 | | Sedapatti R. Muthiah (1945–2022) | Ministry of Surface Transport | 19 March 1998 | 8 April 1998 | 20 days | Periyakulam (Lok Sabha) | Atal Bihari Vajpayee |
| 4 | | M. Thambi Durai (b. 1947) | Ministry of Law and Justice and Company Affairs | 19 March 1998 | 8 April 1999 | 1 year, 20 days | Karur (Lok Sabha) | Atal Bihari Vajpayee |
| 4 | | M. Thambi Durai (b. 1947) | Ministry of Surface Transport | 8 April 1998 | 8 April 1999 | 1 year | Karur (Lok Sabha) | Atal Bihari Vajpayee |

=== List of chief ministers ===
==== Chief Ministers of Tamil Nadu ====
| No. | Portrait | Name (Birth–Death) | Term in office | | | Assembly (Election) | Elected constituency | Ministry |
| No. | Portrait | Name (Birth–Death) | Assumed office | Left office | Time in office | Assembly (Election) | Elected constituency | Ministry |
|---|---|---|---|---|---|---|---|---|
| 1 | | M. G. Ramachandran (1917–1987) | 30 June 1977 | 17 February 1980 | 10 years, 65 days | 6th (1977) | Aruppukkottai | Ramachandran I |
| 1 | | M. G. Ramachandran (1917–1987) | 9 June 1980 | 9 February 1985 | 10 years, 65 days | 7th (1980) | Madurai West | Ramachandran II |
| 1 | | M. G. Ramachandran (1917–1987) | 10 February 1985 | 24 December 1987 | 10 years, 65 days | 8th (1984) | Andipatti | Ramachandran III |
| Acting | | V. R. Nedunchezhiyan (1920–2000) | 24 December 1987 | 7 January 1988 | 14 days | 8th (1984) | Athoor | Nedunchezhiyan II |
| 2 | | V. N. Janaki Ramachandran (1923–1996) | 7 January 1988 | 30 January 1988 | 23 days | 8th (1984) | did not contest | Janaki |
| 3 | | J. Jayalalithaa (1948–2016) | 24 June 1991 | 12 May 1996 | 14 years, 124 days | 10th (1991) | Bargur | Jayalalithaa I |
| 3 | | J. Jayalalithaa (1948–2016) | 14 May 2001 | 21 September 2001 | 14 years, 124 days | 12th (2001) | did not contest | Jayalalithaa II |
| 3 | | J. Jayalalithaa (1948–2016) | 2 March 2002 | 12 May 2006 | 14 years, 124 days | 12th (2001) | Andipatti | Jayalalithaa III |
| 3 | | J. Jayalalithaa (1948–2016) | 16 May 2011 | 27 September 2014 | 14 years, 124 days | 14th (2011) | Srirangam | Jayalalithaa IV |
| 3 | | J. Jayalalithaa (1948–2016) | 23 May 2015 | 22 May 2016 | 14 years, 124 days | 14th (2011) | Dr. Radhakrishnan Nagar | Jayalalithaa V |
| 3 | | J. Jayalalithaa (1948–2016) | 23 May 2016 | 5 December 2016 | 14 years, 124 days | 15th (2016) | Dr. Radhakrishnan Nagar | Jayalalithaa VI |
| 4 | | O. Panneerselvam (b. 1951) | 21 September 2001 | 2 March 2002 | 1 year, 105 days | 12th (2001) | Periyakulam | Panneerselvam I |
| 4 | | O. Panneerselvam (b. 1951) | 28 September 2014 | 23 May 2015 | 1 year, 105 days | 14th (2011) | Bodinayakanur | Panneerselvam II |
| 4 | | O. Panneerselvam (b. 1951) | 6 December 2016 | 15 February 2017 | 1 year, 105 days | 15th (2016) | Bodinayakanur | Panneerselvam III |
| 5 | | Edappadi K. Palaniswami (b. 1954) | 16 February 2017 | 6 May 2021 | 4 years, 79 days | 15th (2016) | Edappadi | Palaniswami |

==== Chief Minister of Puducherry ====
| No. | Portrait | Name (Birth–Death) | Term in office | | | Assembly (Election) | Elected constituency | Ministry |
| No. | Portrait | Name (Birth–Death) | Assumed office | Left office | Time in office | Assembly (Election) | Elected constituency | Ministry |
|---|---|---|---|---|---|---|---|---|
| 1 | | S. Ramassamy (1939–2017) | 6 March 1974 | 28 March 1974 | 1 year, 155 days | 4th (1974) | Karaikal South | Ramassamy I |
| 1 | | S. Ramassamy (1939–2017) | 2 July 1977 | 12 November 1978 | 1 year, 155 days | 5th (1977) | Karaikal South | Ramassamy II |

=== List of deputy speakers of the Lok Sabha ===
| No. | Portrait | Name (Birth–Death) | Term in office | | | Lok Sabha (Election) | Elected constituency | Speaker |
| No. | Portrait | Name (Birth–Death) | Assumed office | Left office | Time in office | Lok Sabha (Election) | Elected constituency | Speaker |
|---|---|---|---|---|---|---|---|---|
| 1 | | M. Thambi Durai (b. 1947) | 22 January 1985 | 27 November 1989 | 9 years, 229 days | 8th (1984) | Dharmapuri | Balram Jakhar |
| 1 | | M. Thambi Durai (b. 1947) | 13 August 2014 | 25 May 2019 | 9 years, 229 days | 16th (2014) | Karur | Sumitra Mahajan |

=== List of ministers of state of the Union ===
| No. | Portrait | Name (Birth–Death) | Portfolio | Term in office | | | Elected constituency (House) | Cabinet Minister | Prime Minister |
| No. | Portrait | Name (Birth–Death) | Portfolio | Assumed office | Left office | Time in office | Elected constituency (House) | Cabinet Minister | Prime Minister |
|---|---|---|---|---|---|---|---|---|---|
| 1 | | R. K. Kumar (1942–1999) | Ministry of Parliamentary Affairs | 19 March 1998 | 22 May 1998 | 64 days | Tamil Nadu (Rajya Sabha) | Madan Lal Khurana | Atal Bihari Vajpayee |
| 1 | | R. K. Kumar (1942–1999) | Ministry of Finance | 20 March 1998 | 22 May 1998 | 63 days | Tamil Nadu (Rajya Sabha) | Yashwant Sinha | Atal Bihari Vajpayee |
| 2 | | Kadambur M. R. Janarthanan (1929–2020) | Ministry of Personnel, Public Grievances and Pensions | 20 March 1998 | 8 April 1999 | 1 year, 19 days | Tirunelveli (Lok Sabha) | Atal Bihari Vajpayee | Atal Bihari Vajpayee |
| 2 | | Kadambur M. R. Janarthanan (1929–2020) | Ministry of Finance | 22 May 1998 | 8 April 1999 | 321 days | Tirunelveli (Lok Sabha) | Yashwant Sinha | Atal Bihari Vajpayee |

=== List of deputy chief ministers ===
==== Deputy Chief Minister of Tamil Nadu ====
| No. | Portrait | Name (Birth–Death) | Term in office | | | Assembly (Election) | Elected constituency | Chief Minister |
| No. | Portrait | Name (Birth–Death) | Assumed office | Left office | Time in office | Assembly (Election) | Elected constituency | Chief Minister |
|---|---|---|---|---|---|---|---|---|
| 1 | | O. Panneerselvam (b. 1951) | 21 August 2017 | 3 May 2021 | 3 years, 255 days | 15th (2016) | Bodinayakanur | Edappadi K. Palaniswami |

=== List of speakers ===
==== Speakers of the Tamil Nadu Legislative Assembly ====
| No. | Portrait | Name (Birth–Death) | Term in office | | | Assembly (Election) | Elected constituency |
| No. | Portrait | Name (Birth–Death) | Assumed office | Left office | Time in office | Assembly (Election) | Elected constituency |
|---|---|---|---|---|---|---|---|
| 1 | | Munu Adhi (1926–2005) | 6 July 1977 | 18 June 1980 | 2 years, 348 days | 6th (1977) | Tambaram |
| 2 | | K. Rajaram (1926–2008) | 21 June 1980 | 24 February 1985 | 4 years, 248 days | 7th (1980) | Panamarathupatti |
| 3 | | P. H. Pandian (1945–2020) | 27 February 1985 | 5 February 1989 | 3 years, 344 days | 8th (1984) | Cheranmadevi |
| 4 | | Sedapatti R. Muthiah (1945–2022) | 3 July 1991 | 21 May 1996 | 4 years, 323 days | 10th (1991) | Sedapatti |
| 5 | | K. Kalimuthu (1942–2006) | 24 May 2001 | 1 February 2006 | 4 years, 253 days | 12th (2001) | Thirumangalam |
| 6 | | D. Jayakumar (b. 1960) | 27 May 2011 | 29 September 2012 | 1 year, 125 days | 14th (2011) | Royapuram |
| 7 | | P. Dhanapal (b. 1951) | 10 October 2012 | 21 May 2016 | 8 years, 193 days | 14th (2011) | Rasipuram |
| 7 | | P. Dhanapal (b. 1951) | 3 June 2016 | 3 May 2021 | 8 years, 193 days | 15th (2016) | Avanashi |

==== Speaker of the Puducherry Legislative Assembly ====
| No. | Portrait | Name (Birth–Death) | Term in office | | | Assembly (Election) | Elected constituency |
| No. | Portrait | Name (Birth–Death) | Assumed office | Left office | Time in office | Assembly (Election) | Elected constituency |
|---|---|---|---|---|---|---|---|
| 1 | | S. Pakkiam (Unknown) | 26 March 1974 | 28 March 1974 | 2 days | 4th (1974) | Bussy |

=== List of deputy speakers ===
==== Deputy Speakers of the Tamil Nadu Legislative Assembly ====
| No. | Portrait | Name (Birth–Death) | Term in office | | | Assembly (Election) | Elected constituency | Speaker |
| No. | Portrait | Name (Birth–Death) | Assumed office | Left office | Time in office | Assembly (Election) | Elected constituency | Speaker |
|---|---|---|---|---|---|---|---|---|
| 1 | | Su. Thirunavukkarasar (b. 1949) | 6 July 1977 | 17 February 1980 | 2 years, 226 days | 6th (1977) | Arantangi | Munu Adhi |
| 2 | | P. H. Pandian (1945–2020) | 21 June 1980 | 15 November 1984 | 4 years, 147 days | 7th (1980) | Cheranmadevi | K. Rajaram |
| 3 | | V. P. Balasubramanian (1946–2003) | 27 February 1985 | 30 January 1988 | 2 years, 337 days | 8th (1984) | Vedasandur | P. H. Pandian |
| 4 | | K. Ponnusamy (b. 1942) | 3 July 1991 | 16 May 1993 | 1 year, 317 days | 10th (1991) | Marungapuri | Sedapatti R. Muthiah |
| 5 | | S. Gandhirajan (b. 1951) | 27 October 1993 | 13 May 1996 | 2 years, 199 days | 10th (1991) | Vedasandur | Sedapatti R. Muthiah |
| 6 | | A. Arunachalam (b. 1948) | 24 May 2001 | 12 May 2006 | 4 years, 353 days | 12th (2001) | Varahur | K. Kalimuthu |
| 7 | | P. Dhanapal (b. 1951) | 27 May 2011 | 9 October 2012 | 1 year, 135 days | 14th (2011) | Rasipuram | D. Jayakumar |
| 8 | | Pollachi V. Jayaraman (b. 1952) | 29 October 2012 | 21 May 2016 | 8 years, 174 days | 14th (2011) | Udumalaipettai | P. Dhanapal |
| 8 | | Pollachi V. Jayaraman (b. 1952) | 3 June 2016 | 3 May 2021 | 8 years, 174 days | 15th (2016) | Pollachi | P. Dhanapal |

=== List of leaders of the house ===
==== Leaders of the House in the Tamil Nadu Legislative Assembly ====
| No. | Portrait | Name (Birth–Death) | Term in office | | | Assembly (Election) | Elected constituency |
| No. | Portrait | Name (Birth–Death) | Assumed office | Left office | Time in office | Assembly (Election) | Elected constituency |
|---|---|---|---|---|---|---|---|
| 1 | | Nanjil K. Manoharan (1929–2000) | 4 July 1977 | 17 February 1980 | 2 years, 228 days | 6th (1977) | Palayamkottai |
| 2 | | V. R. Nedunchezhiyan (1920–2000) | 19 June 1980 | 15 November 1984 | 12 years, 51 days | 7th (1980) | Tirunelveli |
| 2 | | V. R. Nedunchezhiyan (1920–2000) | 25 February 1985 | 6 January 1988 | 12 years, 51 days | 8th (1984) | Athoor |
| 2 | | V. R. Nedunchezhiyan (1920–2000) | 1 July 1991 | 13 May 1996 | 12 years, 51 days | 10th (1991) | Theni |
| 3 | | R. M. Veerappan (1926–2024) | 7 January 1988 | 30 January 1988 | 23 days | 8th (1984) | Tirunelveli |
| 4 | | C. Ponnaiyan (b. 1942) | 22 May 2001 | 12 May 2006 | 4 years, 355 days | 12th (2001) | Tiruchengode |
| 5 | | O. Panneerselvam (b. 1951) | 23 May 2011 | 27 November 2014 | 8 years 127 days | 14th (2011) | Bodinayakkanur |
| 5 | | O. Panneerselvam (b. 1951) | 12 August 2015 | 21 May 2016 | 8 years 127 days | 14th (2011) | Bodinayakkanur |
| 5 | | O. Panneerselvam (b. 1951) | 25 May 2016 | 16 February 2017 | 8 years 127 days | 15th (2016) | Bodinayakkanur |
| 5 | | O. Panneerselvam (b. 1951) | 4 January 2018 | 3 May 2021 | 8 years 127 days | 15th (2016) | Bodinayakkanur |
| 6 | | Natham R. Viswanathan (b. 1949) | 28 November 2014 | 11 August 2015 | 256 days | 14th (2011) | Natham |
| 7 | | K. A. Sengottaiyan (b. 1948) | 17 February 2017 | 3 January 2018 | 320 days | 15th (2016) | Gobichettipalayam |

==== Leader of the House in the Puducherry Legislative Assembly ====
| No. | Portrait | Name (Birth–Death) | Term in office | | | Assembly (Election) | Elected constituency |
| No. | Portrait | Name (Birth–Death) | Assumed office | Left office | Time in office | Assembly (Election) | Elected constituency |
|---|---|---|---|---|---|---|---|
| 1 | | S. Ramassamy (1939–2017) | 6 March 1974 | 28 March 1974 | 1 year, 155 days | 4th (1974) | Karaikal South |
| 1 | | S. Ramassamy (1939–2017) | 2 July 1977 | 12 November 1978 | 1 year, 155 days | 5th (1977) | Karaikal South |

=== List of leaders of the opposition ===
==== Leaders of the Opposition in the Tamil Nadu Legislative Assembly ====
| No. | Portrait | Name (Birth–Death) | Term in office | | | Assembly (Election) | Elected constituency |
| No. | Portrait | Name (Birth–Death) | Assumed office | Left office | Time in office | Assembly (Election) | Elected constituency |
|---|---|---|---|---|---|---|---|
| 1 | | J. Jayalalithaa (1948–2016) | 9 February 1989 | 1 December 1989 | 5 years, 280 days | 9th (1989) | Bodinayakanur |
| 1 | | J. Jayalalithaa (1948–2016) | 29 May 2006 | 14 May 2011 | 5 years, 280 days | 13th (2006) | Andipatti |
| 2 | | S. R. Eradha (1934–2020) | 1 December 1989 | 19 January 1991 | 1 year, 49 days | 9th (1989) | Madurai East |
| 3 | | O. Panneerselvam (b. 1951) | 19 May 2006 | 28 May 2006 | 9 days | 13th (2006) | Periyakulam |
| 4 | | Edappadi K. Palaniswami (b. 1954) | 11 May 2021 | 5 May 2026 | 4 years, 359 days | 16th (2021) | Edappadi |

==== Leaders of the Opposition in the Puducherry Legislative Assembly ====
| No. | Portrait | Name (Birth–Death) | Term in office | | | Assembly (Election) | Elected constituency |
| No. | Portrait | Name (Birth–Death) | Assumed office | Left office | Time in office | Assembly (Election) | Elected constituency |
|---|---|---|---|---|---|---|---|
| 1 | | P. K. Loganathan (1938–2013) | 16 March 1985 | 4 March 1990 | 4 years, 353 days | 7th (1985) | Oupalam |
| 2 | | V. M. C. V. Ganapathy (b. 1960) | 4 July 1991 | 13 May 1996 | 4 years, 314 days | 9th (1991) | Neravy – T. R. Pattinam |

=== List of deputy leaders of the opposition ===
==== Deputy Leaders of the Opposition in the Tamil Nadu Legislative Assembly ====
| No. | Portrait | Name (Birth–Death) | Term in office | | | Assembly (Election) | Elected constituency | Leader of the Opposition |
| No. | Portrait | Name (Birth–Death) | Assumed office | Left office | Time in office | Assembly (Election) | Elected constituency | Leader of the Opposition |
|---|---|---|---|---|---|---|---|---|
| 1 | | Su. Thirunavukkarasar (b. 1949) | 9 February 1989 | 23 July 1990 | 1 year, 164 days | 9th (1989) | Aranthangi | J. Jayalalithaa S. R. Eradha |
| 2 | | K. A. Sengottaiyan (b. 1948) | 23 June 1990 | 19 January 1991 | 189 days | 9th (1989) | Gobichettipalayam | S. R. Eradha |
| 2 | | K. A. Sengottaiyan (b. 1948) | 19 May 2006 | 28 May 2006 | 189 days | 13th (2006) | Gobichettipalayam | O. Panneerselvam |
| 3 | | O. Panneerselvam (b. 1951) | 29 May 2006 | 14 May 2011 | 6 years, 12 days | 13th (2006) | Periyakulam | J. Jayalalithaa |
| 3 | | O. Panneerselvam (b. 1951) | 14 June 2021 | 11 July 2022 | 6 years, 12 days | 16th (2021) | Bodinayakanur | Edappadi K. Palaniswami |
| 4 | | R. B. Udhayakumar (b. 1973) | 19 July 2022 | 5 May 2026 | 3 years, 290 days | 16th (2021) | Thirumangalam | Edappadi K. Palaniswami |

== See also ==
- Politics of India
- Elections in India
- AIADMK-led Alliance
- Politics of Tamil Nadu
- Elections in Tamil Nadu
- Elections in Puducherry
- List of political parties in India
- List of political parties in Tamil Nadu
- List of general secretaries of the All India Anna Dravida Munnetra Kazhagam
