= Second Nedunchezhiyan ministry =

Government of Tamil Nadu, India (1987–88)

Second Nedunchezhiyan Ministry
- Acting Ministry of Tamil Nadu
- Head of the government
- Date formed: 24 December 1987
- Date dissolved: 7 January 1988

People and organisations
- Governor: S. L. Khurana
- Chief Minister: V. R. Nedunchezhiyan
- Chief Minister's history: Indian politician
- Total no. of members: 13
- Member party: All India Anna Dravida Munnetra Kazhagam
- Status in legislature: Majority
- Opposition party: Indian National Congress
- Opposition leader: O. Subramanian

History
- Election: 1984
- Outgoing election: 1980
- Legislature term: 14 days
- Predecessor: Third Ramachandran ministry
- Successor: Janaki ministry

The sudden demise of M.G. Ramachandran 24 December 1987, the Council of Ministers headed by him was dissolved. The Governor appointed V.R. Nedunchezhiyan Senior Most Member of the outgoing Council to act as Chief Minister till the election of new Leader and on his advice appointed Council of Ministers.

== Cabinet ministers ==
S.no	Name	Designation	Party
Chief Minister
1.	V.R. Nedunchezhiyan	Chief Minister	AIADMK
Cabinet Ministers
2.	Panruti S. Ramachandran	Minister for Food	AIADMK
3.	R.M. VEERAPPAN	Minister for Local Administration	AIADMK
4.	K. RAJARAM	Minister for Industries and Agriculture	AIADMK
5.	P.U SHANMUGAM	Minister for Health	AIADMK
6.	C. PONNAIYAN	Minister for Education and Law	AIADMK
7.	S. MUTHUSAMY	Minister for Transport	AIADMK
8.	S. THIRUNAVUKKAARASU	Minister for Housing and Handlooms	AIADMK
9.	V.V. SWAMINATHAN	Minister for Tourism, Prohibition and Electricity	AIADMK
10.	R.SOUNDARARAJAN	Minister for Noon Meal and Social Welfare	AIADMK
11.	T. RAMASAMY	Minister for Commercial Taxes	AIADMK
12.	A.ARUNACHALAM	Minister for Adi Dravidar Welfare	AIADMK
13.	K.K.S.S.R. RAMACHANDRAN	Minister for Public Works	AIADMK
