= Third Ramachandran ministry =

Government of Tamil Nadu, India (1985–87)

- 6th Ministry of Tamil Nadu

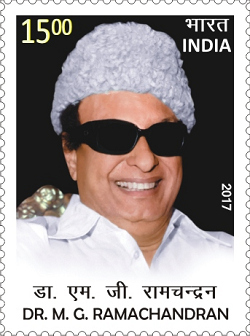
- M.G.R.
- Date formed: 10 February 1985
- Date dissolved: 24 December 1987

People and organisations
- Head of state: Governor Sundar Lal Khurana
- Head of government: M. G. Ramachandran
- Member parties: AIADMK
- Status in legislature: Majority
- Opposition party: INC
- Opposition leader: O. Subramanian (assembly)

History
- Election: 1984
- Legislature term: 5 Years
- Predecessor: Second Ramachandran ministry
- Successor: V. N. Janaki Ramachandran ministry Second Nedunchezhiyan ministry(interim)

After the General Elections held in December 1984 the Governor appointed M.G. Ramachandran as Chief Minister heading the new Government on 10 February 1985 and appointed 16 more Ministers on 14 February 1985.

== Cabinet ministers ==
S.no	Name	Designation	Party
Chief Minister
1.	M. G. Ramachandran	Chief Minister	AIADMK
Cabinet Ministers
2.	V.R. Nedunchezhiyan	Minister for Finance	AIADMK
3.	Panruti S. Ramachandran	Minister for Food	AIADMK
4.	R.M. VEERAPPAN	Minister for Local Administration	AIADMK
5.	K. RAJARAM	Minister for Industries and Agriculture	AIADMK
6.	P.U SHANMUGAM	Minister for Health	AIADMK
7.	C. PONNAIYAN	Minister for Education and Law	AIADMK
8.	S. MUTHUSAMY	Minister for Transport	AIADMK
9.	S. THIRUNAVUKKAARASU	Minister for Housing and Handlooms	AIADMK
10.	V.V. SWAMINATHAN	Minister for Tourism, Prohibition and Electricity	AIADMK
11.	R.SOUNDARARAJAN	Minister for Noon Meal and Social Welfare	AIADMK
12.	T. RAMASAMY	Minister for Commercial Taxes	AIADMK
13.	A.ARUNACHALAM	Minister for Adi Dravidar Welfare	AIADMK
14.	K.K.S.S.R. RAMACHANDRAN	Minister for Public Works	AIADMK
