= Second Ramachandran ministry =

Government of Tamil Nadu, India (1980–84)

Second Ramachandran Ministry
- 5th Ministry of Tamil Nadu
- Head of the government
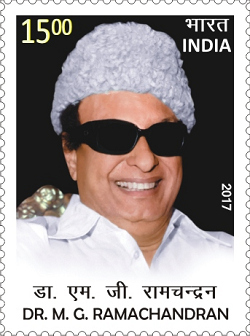
- Dr. M. G. Ramachandran; Former Chief Minister of Tamil Nadu
- Date formed: 9 June 1980
- Date dissolved: 15 November 1984

People and organisations
- Governor: Prabhudas B. Patwari
- Chief Minister: M. G. Ramachandran
- Chief Minister's history: Indian film actor
- Member party: All India Anna Dravida Munnetra Kazhagam
- Status in legislature: Majority
- Opposition party: Dravida Munnetra Kazhagam (27 June 1980 – 18 August 1983); Indian National Congress (29 August 1983 – 15 November 1984)
- Opposition leader: M. Karunanidhi (27 June 1980 – 18 August 1983); K. S. G. Haja Shareef (29 August 1983 – 15 November 1984)

History
- Election: 1980
- Outgoing election: 1977
- Legislature terms: 4 years, 160 days
- Predecessor: First Ramachandran ministry
- Successor: Third Ramachandran ministry

The Second Ministry of Ramachandran was the Council of Ministers, headed by M. G. Ramachandran, that was formed after the seventh legislative assembly election, which was held in two phases on the 28th and 31st of May 1980. The results of the election were announced in June 1980, and this led to the formation of the 7th Assembly. On 9 June 1980, the Council took office.

== Constitutional requirement ==
=== For the Council of Ministers to aid and advise Governor ===
According to Article 163 of the Indian Constitution,

# There shall be a Council of Ministers with the Chief Minister at the head to aid and advise the Governor in the exercise of his function, except in so far as he is by or under this Constitution required to exercise his functions or any of them in his discretion.

1. If any question arises whether any matter is or is not a matter as respects which the Governor is by or under this Constitution required to act in his discretion, the decision of the Governor in his discretion shall be final, and the validity of anything done by the Governor shall not be called in question on the ground that he ought or ought not to have acted in his discretion.
2. The question whether any, and if so what, advice was tendered by Ministers to the Governor shall not be inquired into in any court.

This means that the Ministers serve under the pleasure of the Governor and he/she may remove them, on the advice of the Chief Minister, whenever they want.

The Chief Minister shall be appointed by the Governor and the other Ministers shall be appointed by the Governor on the advice of the Chief Minister, and the Minister shall hold office during the pleasure of the Governor:
Provided that in the States of Bihar, Madhya Pradesh and Odisha, there shall be a Minister in charge of tribal welfare who may in addition be in charge of the welfare of the Scheduled Castes and backward classes or any other work.

# The Council of Minister shall be collectively responsible to the Legislative Assembly of the State.

1. Before a Minister enters upon his office, the Governor shall administer to him the oaths of office and of secrecy according to the forms set out for the purpose in the Third Schedule.
2. A Minister who for any period of six consecutive months is not a member of the Legislature of the State shall at the expiration of that period cease to be a Minister.
3. The salaries and allowances of Ministers shall be such as the Legislature of the State may from time to time by law determine and, until the Legislature of the State so determines, shall be a specified in the Second Schedule.

== Cabinet ministers ==
S.no	Name	Designation	Party
Chief Minister
1.	M.G. RAMACHANDRAN	Chief Minister (Also in charge of Home Ministry)	AIADMK
Cabinet Ministers
2.	Dr. V.R. Nedunchezhian	Minister for Finance	AIADMK
3.	Panruti S. Ramachandran	Minister for Electricity	AIADMK
4.	K.A. KRISHNASAMY	Minister for Dairy Development	AIADMK
5.	R.M. VEERAPPAN	Minister for Information and Religious Endowments	AIADMK
6.	C. ARANGANAYAGAM	Minister for Education	AIADMK
7.	K. KALIMUTHU	Minister for Agriculture	AIADMK
8.	C. PONNAIYAN	Minister for Law and Industries	AIADMK
9.	S. RAGHAVANANDHAM	Minister for Labour	AIADMK
10.	H.V. HANDE	Minister for Health	AIADMK
11.	S. MUTHUSAMY	Minister for Transport	AIADMK
12.	S. THIRUNAVUKKARASU	Minister for Handlooms	AIADMK
13.	S. RAJENDRAN	Minister for Environmental Pollution Control	AIADMK
14.	R. SOUNDARARAJAN	Minister for Local Administration	AIADMK
15.	S.R. ERADHA	Minister for Public Works	AIADMK
16.	M.R. GOVENDAN	Minister for Backward Classes	AIADMK
17.	GOMATHI SRINIVASAN	Minister for Social Welfare	AIADMK
18.	VIJAYALAKSHMI PALANISAMY	Minister for Khadi	AIADMK
19.	Y.S.M. YUSUF	Minister for Irrigation and Wakf	AIADMK
20.	R. ARUNACHALAM	Minister for Rural Industries	AIADMK
21.	K. KALAIMANI	Minister for Fisheries	AIADMK
22.	T. VEERASWAMY	Minister for Food	AIADMK
23.	K.K.S.S.R. RAMACHANDRAN	Minister for Co-operation	AIADMK
