= Vanagaram =

- neighborhood
- Location within Chennai Location within Tamil Nadu Location within India
- Coordinates: 13°3′12″N 80°9′40″E
- Country: India
- State: Tamil Nadu
- Metro: Chennai

Languages
  - Official: Tamil
- Time zone: UTC+5:30 (IST)
- Vehicle registration: TN-12
- Lok Sabha constituency: Chennai Central
- Vidhan Sabha constituency: Maduravoyal

Vanagaram, which is pronounced as Vaanagaram, is a residential neighborhood in Chennai, Tamil Nadu India. It is in North-East of Chennai and the fastest developing parts of the city. It has always been a smart and affluent residential suburb, but more recently Vanagaram has become a busy commercial and educational center as well.

- (In Tamil language), 'Vaan' means 'sky' and 'agaram' means 'the place of God for worshipping/residence'.
