= Appanaickenpalayam =

Neighbourhood in Coimbatore district, Tamil Nadu, India

- Neighbourhood
- Appanaickenpalayam, Coimbatore district, Tamil Nadu
- Coordinates: 11.0769°N 76.9225°E
- Country: India
- State: Tamil Nadu
- District: Coimbatore
- Elevation: 491.61 m (1,612.9 ft)

Languages
  - Official: Tamil, English
  - Speech: Tamil, English
- Time zone: UTC+5:30 (IST)
- PIN: 641017
- Telephone code: +91422*******
- Other Neighbourhoods: Thudiyalur, Goundampalayam, Somayampalayam, Vadavalli
- Corporation: Coimbatore Municipal Corporation
- LS: Coimbatore
- VS: Kavundampalayam

Appanaickenpalayam is a neighbourhood in Coimbatore district of Tamil Nadu state in India.

Appanaickenpalayam (Tamil Nadu)

== Religion ==
There is a Hindu temple, Mariamman shrine, situated in Appanaickenpalayam. It is maintained under the control of Hindu Religious and Charitable Endowments Department, Government of Tamil Nadu.

== Politics ==
Appanaickenpalayam neighbourhood falls under the Kavundampalayam Assembly constituency. Also, this area belongs to Coimbatore Lok Sabha constituency.
