= Coimbatore North Assembly constituency =

One of the 234 State Legislative Assembly Constituencies in Tamil Nadu

Coordinates: 11.09°N 76.97°E

Coimbatore North
- Constituency No. 118 for the Tamil Nadu Legislative Assembly
- Interactive map outlining Coimbatore North assembly constituency in Coimbatore district

Constituency details
- Country: India
- Region: South India
- State: Tamil Nadu
- District: Coimbatore
- Lok Sabha constituency: Coimbatore
- Established: 2008
- Total electors: 2,96,994
- Reservation: None

Member of Legislative Assembly
- 17th Tamil Nadu Legislative Assembly
- Incumbent V. Sampath Kumar
- Party: TVK
- Alliance: TVK+
- Elected year: 2026

Coimbatore North is a legislative assembly constituency in the Indian state of Tamil Nadu. Its State Assembly Constituency number is 118. It covers parts of Coimbatore. Coimbatore North Assembly constituency is a part of Coimbatore Lok Sabha constituency. It was created in the 2008 delimitation. Coimbatore (North) was one of 17 assembly constituencies to have VVPAT facility with EVMs in the 2016 Tamil Nadu Legislative Assembly election. It is one of the 234 State Legislative Assembly Constituencies in Tamil Nadu.

== Members of Legislative Assembly ==
=== Tamil Nadu - Coimbatore North ===
| Duration | Winner | Party |
|---|---|---|
| 2011 | T. Malaravan | All India Anna Dravida Munnetra Kazhagam |
| 2016 | G. Arunkumar | All India Anna Dravida Munnetra Kazhagam |
| 2021 | Amman K. Arjunan | All India Anna Dravida Munnetra Kazhagam |
| 2026 | V. Sampath Kumar | Tamilaga Vettri Kazhagam |

== Election results ==
Vote share of Winning candidates
| 2026 | 40.91% |
| 2021 | 40.15% |
| 2016 | 41.05% |
| 2011 | 60.07% |

=== 2026 ===
2026 Tamil Nadu Legislative Assembly election: Coimbatore North
| Party | Candidate | Votes | % | ±% |
|---|---|---|---|---|
| TVK | V. Sampath Kumar | 92,500 | 40.91 | New |
| DMK | Durai. Senthamil Selvan B.E | 70,508 | 31.18 | ▼7.00 |
| BJP | Vanathi Srinivasan | 49,722 | 21.99 | New |
| NTK | Narmadha. G. | 9,036 | 4.00 | ▼1.64 |
| NOTA | None of the above | 1,020 | 0.45 | ▼0.39 |
| BSP | P. Krishnasamy | 383 | 0.17 | New |
| Independent | A.K. Senthamizh Selvan | 351 | 0.16 | New |
| Thamizhaka Padaippalar Makkal Katchi | K. Udhayakumar | 327 | 0.14 | New |
| Independent | R. Sampath Kumar | 310 | 0.14 | New |
| Independent | Balu. P.M. | 276 | 0.12 | New |
| Independent | Palanikumar. V. | 152 | 0.07 | New |
| Independent | S. Sampathkumar | 134 | 0.06 | New |
| Independent | P. Saravanan | 121 | 0.05 | New |
| Samaniya Makkal Nala Katchi | S. Senthilkumar | 121 | 0.05 | New |
| Independent | V. Krishnan | 118 | 0.05 | New |
| All India Puratchi Thalaivar Makkal Munnetra Kazhagam | K. Raghul Gandhi | 112 | 0.05 | New |
| Independent | G.D. Krishnakumar | 104 | 0.05 | New |
| TVK | Rajasekaran. B. | 96 | 0.04 | New |
| Independent | Ravi. V | 95 | 0.04 | New |
| Independent | R. Manian | 89 | 0.04 | New |
| Independent | S. Dhana Raj | 87 | 0.04 | New |
| Makkal Manadu | S. Meenakshi Sundaram | 75 | 0.03 | New |
| Independent | K. Sampath Kumar | 71 | 0.03 | New |
| Independent | V. Lingaraja | 65 | 0.03 | New |
| Independent | R. Sethuragunathan | 60 | 0.03 | New |
| Independent | A. Marimuthu | 54 | 0.02 | New |
| Independent | R. Sathish Kumar | 54 | 0.02 | New |
| Independent | G. Rajkumar | 42 | 0.02 | New |
| Independent | A. Ramesh | 26 | 0.01 | New |
| Margin of victory | | 21,992 | 9.73 | ▲7.76 |
| Turnout | | 2,26,109 | 76.13 | ▲16.23 |
| Registered electors | | 2,96,994 | | ▼41,654 |
| TVK gain from AIADMK | | Swing | ▲40.91 | |

=== 2021 ===
2021 Tamil Nadu Legislative Assembly election: Coimbatore (North)
| Party | Candidate | Votes | % | ±% |
|---|---|---|---|---|
| AIADMK | Amman K. Arjunan | 81,454 | 40.15 | −0.90 |
| DMK | Shanmugasundaram V. M | 77,453 | 38.18 | 1.22 |
| MNM | Thangavelu R | 26,503 | 13.06 | |
| NTK | Balendran C. B | 11,433 | 5.64 | 3.99 |
| NOTA | Nota | 1,701 | 0.84 | −1.58 |
| AMMK | Appathurai N. R | 1,659 | 0.82 | |
| Margin of victory | | 4,001 | 1.97 | −2.12 |
| Turnout | | 2,02,860 | 59.90 | −2.15 |
| Rejected ballots | | 61 | 0.03 | |
| Registered electors | | 3,38,648 | | |
| AIADMK hold | | Swing | -0.90 | |

=== 2016 ===
2016 Tamil Nadu Legislative Assembly election: Coimbatore (North)
| Party | Candidate | Votes | % | ±% |
|---|---|---|---|---|
| AIADMK | Arun Kumar. P. R. G. | 77,540 | 41.05 | −19.02 |
| DMK | S. Meenalogu | 69,816 | 36.96 | 2.72 |
| BJP | Kannan Alias S. Devaraj | 16,741 | 8.86 | 5.70 |
| DMDK | S. M. Murugan. P. | 12,153 | 6.43 | |
| NOTA | None Of The Above | 4,574 | 2.42 | |
| NTK | Balendran. C. B. | 3,114 | 1.65 | |
| PMK | Kamaraj Natesan | 2,196 | 1.16 | |
| Margin of victory | | 7,724 | 4.09 | −21.73 |
| Turnout | | 1,88,882 | 62.06 | −7.93 |
| Registered electors | | 3,04,374 | | |
| AIADMK hold | | Swing | -19.02 | |

=== 2011 ===
2011 Tamil Nadu Legislative Assembly election: Coimbatore (North)
| Party | Candidate | Votes | % | ±% |
|---|---|---|---|---|
| AIADMK | T. Malaravan | 93,276 | 60.07 | |
| DMK | Veeragopal M. | 53,178 | 34.25 | |
| BJP | Subbian G. M. | 4,910 | 3.16 | |
| LTSP | Durairaj K | 1,887 | 1.22 | |
| UMK | Sathish Kumar T | 975 | 0.63 | |
| Independent | Saminathan M. S. | 748 | 0.48 | |
| BSP | Pushpanantham V | 308 | 0.20 | |
| Margin of victory | | 40,098 | 25.82 | |
| Turnout | | 1,55,282 | 69.99 | |
| Registered electors | | 2,21,863 | | |
| AIADMK gain from DMK | | Swing | | |
