= Palanisamy =

Palanisamy is a common Indian name.

== Politicians ==
- K. N. Palanisamy Gounder, former Tiruppur MLA
- G. Palanisamy, former Thiruthuraipundi MLA
- Edappadi K. Palaniswami, Ex-Chief Minister of Tamil Nadu & Edapadi MLA
- K. C. Palanisamy, former Indian Member of Parliament from Karur
- N. K. Palanisamy, former Perundurai MLA
- Pongalur N. Palanisamy, Tamil Nadu minister for Rural Industries and Animal Husbandry.
- S. Palanisamy, former Mettupalayam MLA
