= R. Manimaran (disambiguation) =

R. Manimaran may refer to:

- R. Manimaran, AIADMK politician elected from Tiruppur Assembly constituency in 1977 and 1980
- R. Manimaran (Dindigul MLA), DMK politician elected in 1996
- R. Manimaran (Poonamallee MLA), AIADMK politician elected in 2011
