= Chinnavedampatti =

- Panchayat town
- Location in Tamil Nadu, India
- Coordinates: 11°5′3″N 76°58′52″E
- Country: India
- State: Tamil Nadu
- District: Coimbatore

Area
  - Total: 4.5 km^{2} (1.7 sq mi)

Population (2011)
  - Total: 20,122
  - Density: 4,500/km^{2} (12,000/sq mi)

Languages
  - Official: Tamil
- Time zone: UTC+5:30 (IST)

Chinnavedampatti is a panchayat town in Coimbatore North taluk of Coimbatore district in the Indian state of Tamil Nadu. It is located in the north-western part of the state. Spread across an area of 4.5 km^{2} (1.7 sq mi), it had a population of 20,122 individuals as per the 2011 census.

== Geography and administration ==
Chinnavedampatti is located in Coimbatore North taluk of Coimbatore district in the Indian state of Tamil Nadu. Spread across an area of 4.5 km^{2} (1.7 sq mi), it is one of the 33 panchayat towns in the district. It is located in the western part of the state. The Chinnadevampatti lake is a freshwater body in the panchayat, which is planned to be used as a discharge body for treated sewage from the Coimbatore Corporation.

The town panchayat is headed by a chairperson, who is elected by the members, who are chosen through direct elections. The town forms part of the Kavundampalayam Assembly constituency that elects its member to the Tamil Nadu legislative assembly and the Coimbatore Lok Sabha constituency that elects its member to the Parliament of India.

== Demographics ==
As per the 2011 census, Chinnavedampatti had a population of 20,122 individuals across 5,571 households. The population saw a significant increase compared to the previous census in 2001 when 10,981 inhabitants were registered. The population consisted of 10,258 males and 9,864 females. About 2,093 individuals were below the age of six years. The entire population is classified as urban. The town has an average literacy rate of 85.5%. About 16.5% of the population belonged to scheduled castes.

About 45.5% of the eligible population were employed. Hinduism was the majority religion which was followed by 93.8% of the population, with Christianity (4.9%) and Islam (1.1%) being minor religions.
