= Arjunan =

Arjunan may refer to:

- Arjunan (actor) (born 1986), Indian actor in Tamil, Telugu, and Malayalam films
- Amman K. Arjunan, Indian politician
- M. K. Arjunan (1936–2020), Indian film and theatre composer
