= S. Gunasekaran =

S. Gunasekaran can mean:

- S. Gunasekaran (Communist Party of India politician)
- S. Gunasekaran (AIADMK politician)
