= Coimbatore South Assembly constituency =

One of the 234 State Legislative Assembly Constituencies in Tamil Nadu in India

Coordinates: 10.93°N 76.96°E

Coimbatore South
- Constituency No. 120 for the Tamil Nadu Legislative Assembly
- Interactive map outlining Coimbatore South assembly constituency in Coimbatore district

Constituency details
- Country: India
- Region: South India
- State: Tamil Nadu
- District: Coimbatore
- Lok Sabha constituency: Coimbatore
- Established: 2008
- Total electors: 1,88,912
- Reservation: None

Member of Legislative Assembly
- 17th Tamil Nadu Legislative Assembly
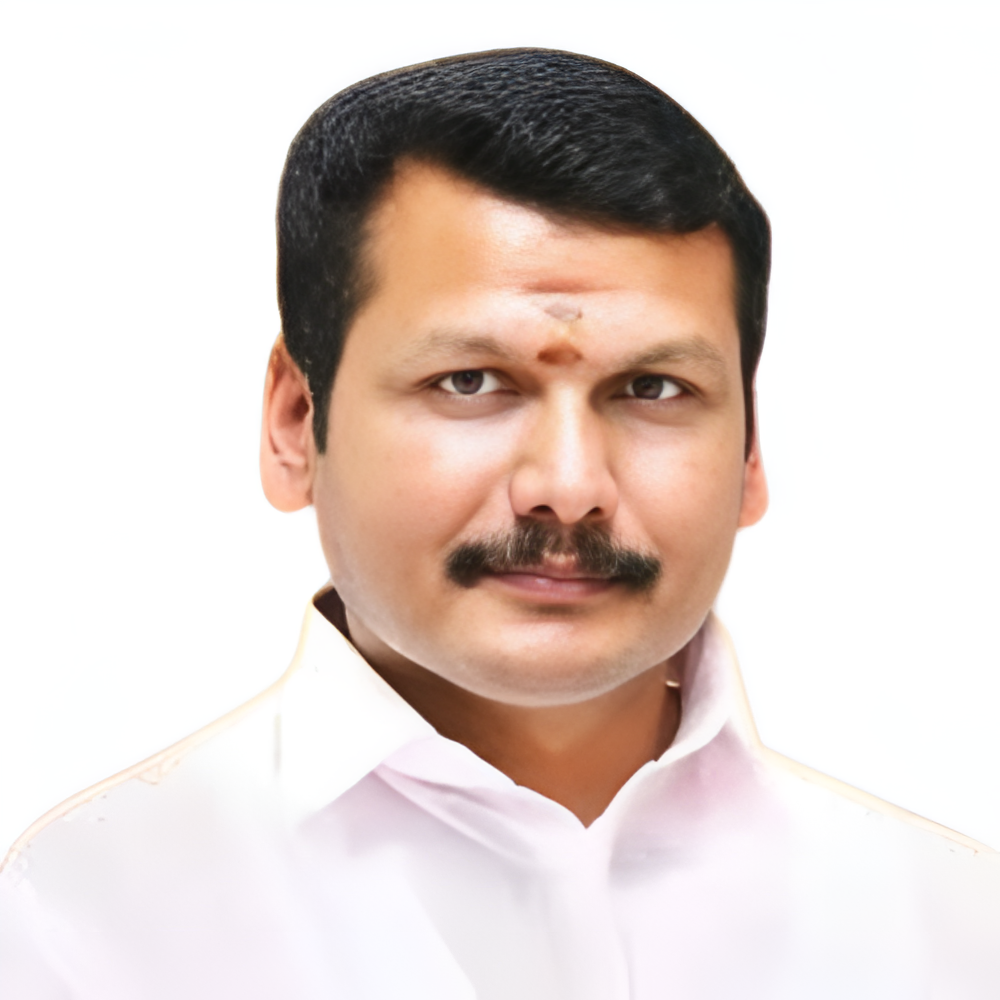
- Incumbent V Senthilbalaji
- Party: DMK
- Alliance: SPA
- Elected year: 2026

Coimbatore South Assembly constituency or 'Coimbatore (South)' is a legislative assembly constituency in the Indian state of Tamil Nadu. Its State Assembly Constituency number is 120. It covers parts of Coimbatore. Coimbatore South Assembly constituency is a part of Coimbatore Lok Sabha constituency. It is one of the 234 State Legislative Assembly Constituencies in Tamil Nadu.

== Members of Legislative Assembly ==
Year	Member	Political party
2011	R. Doraisamy	All India Anna Dravida Munnetra Kazhagam
2016	Amman K. Arjunan	All India Anna Dravida Munnetra Kazhagam
2021	Vanathi Srinivasan	Bharatiya Janata Party
2026	V. Senthil Balaji	Dravida Munnetra Kazhagam

== Election results ==
Vote share of Winning candidates
2026	38.16%
2021	34.38%
2016	38.94%
2011	56.27%

=== 2026 ===
2026 Tamil Nadu Legislative Assembly election: Coimbatore South
Party	Candidate	Votes	%	±%
DMK	V. Senthilbalaji	59,724	38.16	New
TVK	V. Senthilkumar	57,453	36.71	New
AIADMK	Amman K. Arjunan	31,689	20.25	New
NTK	V. Perarivalan	5,062	3.23	▲0.45
NOTA	None of the above	759	0.48	▼0.10
Independent	J. Praveenkumar	170	0.11	New
Independent	M. Senthilkumar	158	0.10	New
TVK	Gokula Krishnan.S	158	0.10	New
New Generation People's Party	B. Dhandapani	157	0.10	New
Independent	P. Palanivel	154	0.10	New
Independent	K. Dinesh Kumar	117	0.07	New
Independent	B. Yuvaraj	105	0.07	New
Independent	V. Senthilkumar	92	0.06	New
Independent	S. Rangaraj	67	0.04	New
Independent	Imthiyas	65	0.04	New
Independent	V. Velmurugan	48	0.03	New
Independent	Venkatachalam Paramasivam	43	0.03	New
Independent	K. Rajapandian	40	0.03	New
Independent	T. Magizhan	40	0.03	New
Independent	L. Hakkim	38	0.02	New
Independent	J. Suriyakumar	37	0.02	New
Independent	P. Sangararaj	36	0.02	New
Makkal Manadu	G. Maheshwaran	36	0.02	New
Independent	M. John Bosco	33	0.02	New
Independent	K. Vijayan	32	0.02	New
Independent	D. Vigneshwaran	32	0.02	New
Independent	N. Abilazan	31	0.02	New
Independent	P. Manoj	28	0.02	New
Independent	K.S. Rajagopal	27	0.02	New
Independent	Gopalakrishnan	24	0.02	New
Independent	P. Kathiravan	23	0.01	New
Independent	M. Ravichandran	21	0.01	New
Margin of victory		2,271	1.45	▲0.33
Turnout		1,56,499	82.84	
Registered electors		1,88,912		
DMK gain from BJP		Swing	New	

=== 2021 ===
2021 Tamil Nadu Legislative Assembly election: Coimbatore South
Party	Candidate	Votes	%	±%
BJP	Vanathi Srinivasan	53,209	34.38	▲12.81
MNM	Kamal Haasan	51,481	33.26	New
INC	Mayura Jayakumar S	42,383	27.39	▼0.21
NTK	Abdul Wahab	4,300	2.78	New
NOTA	None of the above	901	0.58	▼1.59
Margin of victory		1,728	1.12	▼10.22
Turnout		1,54,765		
BJP gain from AIADMK		Swing		

=== 2016 ===
2016 Tamil Nadu Legislative Assembly election: Coimbatore South
Party	Candidate	Votes	%	±%
AIADMK	Amman K. Arjunan	59,788	38.94	▼17.33
INC	Mayura Jayakumar S	42,369	27.60	▲27.60
BJP	Vanathi Srinivasan	33,113	21.57	▲17.96
CPI(M)	C. Padmanaban	7,248	4.72	▲4.72
NOTA	None of the above	3,331	2.17	▲2.17
Margin of victory		17,419	11.34	▼8.05
Turnout		1,53,541	62.59	▼9.00
AIADMK hold		Swing	▼17.33	

=== 2011 ===
2011 Tamil Nadu Legislative Assembly election: Coimbatore South
Party	Candidate	Votes	%	±%
AIADMK	R. Doraisamy	80,637	56.27	▲56.27
DMK	Pongalur N. Palanisamy	52,841	36.88	▲36.88
BJP	Nandha Kumar C R	5,177	3.61	▲3.61
LSP	Vijay Anand M	1,765	1.23	▲1.23
IJK	Eswaran G R	573	0.40	▲0.40
Margin of victory		27,796	19.39	−−−−
Turnout		1,43,369	71.59	New
AIADMK win (new seat)				
