= Tiruppur Lok Sabha constituency =

Parliamentary constituency in Tamil Nadu, India

Coordinates: 11.1°N 77.4°E

Tiruppur
- Lok Sabha constituency
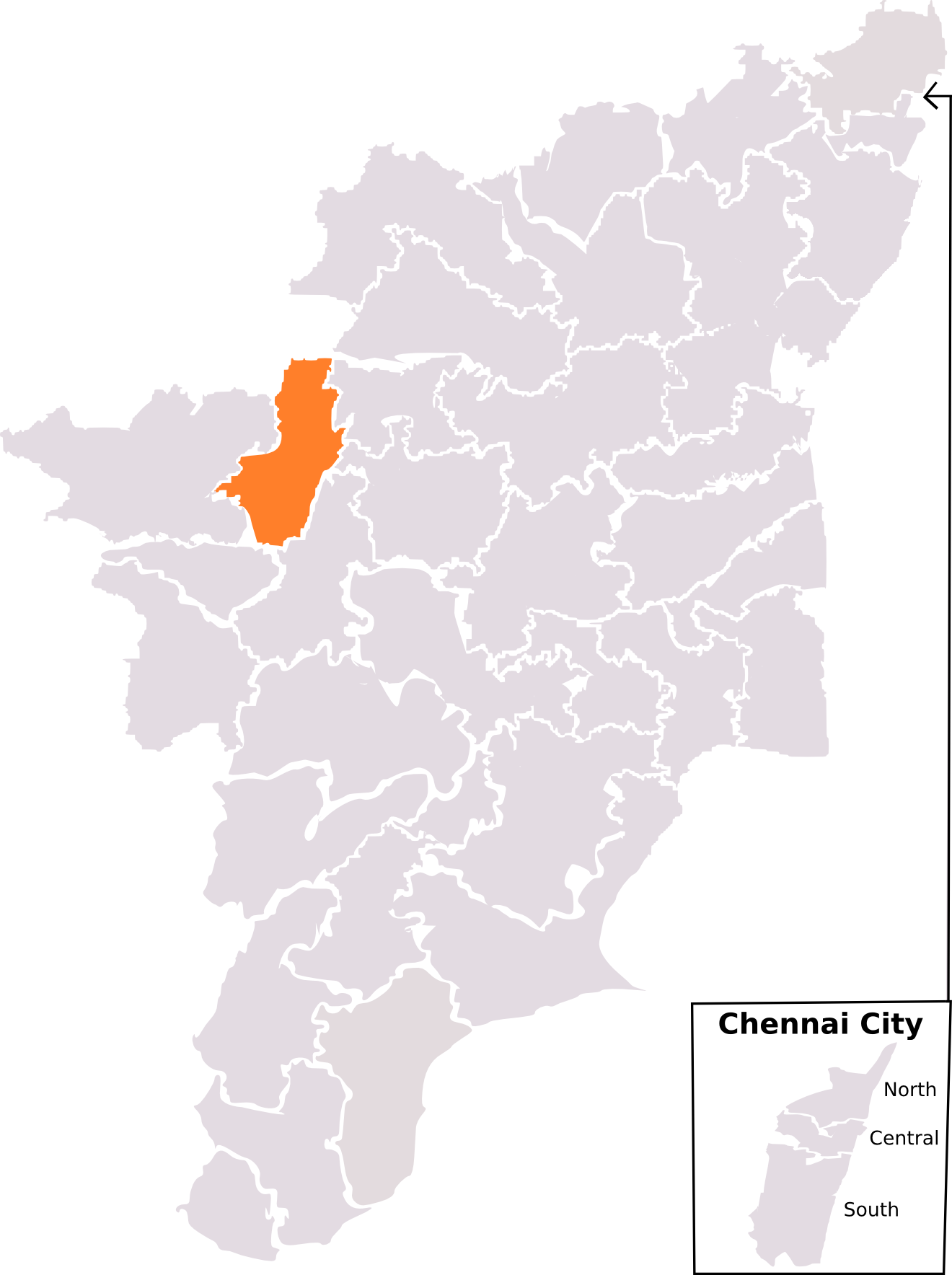
- Tiruppur constituency, post-2008 delimitation

Constituency details
- Country: India
- Region: South India
- State: Tamil Nadu
- Assembly constituencies: Perundurai; Bhavani; Anthiyur; Gobichettipalayam; Tiruppur North; Tiruppur South
- Established: 2008
- Total electors: 15,29,836

Member of Parliament
- 18th Lok Sabha
- Incumbent K. Subbarayan
- Party: CPI
- Alliance: INDIA
- Elected year: 2024
- Preceded by: V. Sathyabama

Tiruppur is a Lok Sabha constituency in Tamil Nadu. Its Tamil Nadu Parliamentary Constituency number is 18 of 39. Originally, Gobichettipalayam, it was converted to Tiruppur by Election commission after rearrangement of constituencies in 2008.

== Assembly segments ==
=== 2009-present ===
Constituency number	Name	Reserved for (SC/ST/None)	District	Party	2024 Lead
103	Perundurai	None	Erode	Vacant	CPI
104	Bhavani	None	Erode	AIADMK	CPI
105	Anthiyur	None	Erode	AIADMK	CPI
106	Gobichettipalayam	None	Erode	TVK	CPI
113	Tiruppur North	None	Tiruppur	TVK	CPI
114	Tiruppur South	None	Tiruppur	TVK	CPI

Year	Winner	Party
1951	T. S. Avinashilingam	Indian National Congress
1957-2009 : See Gobichettipalayam
2009	C. Sivasamy	All India Anna Dravida Munnetra Kazhagam
2014	V. Sathyabama	All India Anna Dravida Munnetra Kazhagam
2019	K. Subbarayan	Communist Party of India
2024	K. Subbarayan	Communist Party of India

== Election results ==
Vote share of Winning candidates
2024	41.38%
2019	45.60%
2014	42.73%
2009	39.92%
1951	56.45%

=== General Elections 2024 ===
2024 Indian general election: Tiruppur
Party	Candidate	Votes	%	±%
CPI	K. Subbarayan	472,739	41.38	▼4.22
AIADMK	P. Arunachalam	346,811	30.35	▼6.88
BJP	A. P. Muruganatham	185,322	16.22	New
NOTA	None of the above	17,737	1.55	▼0.41
Margin of victory		125,928	11.02	▼2.65
Turnout		1,142,549		
Registered electors				
CPI hold		Swing		

=== General Elections 2019 ===
2019 Indian general election: Tiruppur
Party	Candidate	Votes	%	±%
CPI	K. Subbarayan	508,725	45.60	
AIADMK	M. S. M. Anandan	4,15,357	37.23	−5.50
MNM	V. S. Chandirakumar	64,657	5.80	
AMMK	S. R. Selvam	43,816	3.93	
NOTA	None of the above	21,861	1.96	+0.61
BSP	C. Ayyanar	7,321	0.66	
Margin of victory		93,368	8.37	−8.94
Turnout		11,15,693	73.21	−2.41
Registered electors		15,30,014		11.23
CPI gain from AIADMK		Swing	2.87	

=== General Elections 2014 ===
2014 Indian general election: Tiruppur
Party	Candidate	Votes	%	±%
AIADMK	V. Sathyabama	442,778	42.73	+2.81
DMDK	N. Dinesh Kumar	2,63,463	25.42	+13.69
DMK	M. Senthilnathan	2,05,411	19.82	New
INC	E. V. K. S. Elangovan	47,554	4.59	−23.81
CPI	K. Subbarayan	33,331	3.22	New
NOTA	None of the above	13,941	1.35	
Margin of victory		1,79,315	17.30	+5.78
Turnout		10,36,249	76.38	+0.78
Registered electors		13,75,589		+38.42
AIADMK hold		Swing	+2.81	

=== General Elections 2009 ===
2009 Indian general election: Tiruppur
Party	Candidate	Votes	%	±%
AIADMK	C. Sivasamy	295,731	39.92	
INC	S. K. Kharventhan	2,10,385	28.40	
KNMK	K. Balasubramanian	95,299	12.86	
DMDK	N. Dinesh Kumar	86,933	11.73	
BJP	M. Sivakumar	11,466	1.55	
Independent	R. Pandian Alais Kalaimagal Pandian	10,356	1.40	
Margin of victory		85,346	11.52	
Turnout		7,40,857	74.64	
Registered electors		9,93,758		
AIADMK win (new seat)				

=== General Elections 1951 ===
1951–52 Indian general election: Tiruppur
Party	Candidate	Votes	%	±%
INC	T. S. Avinashilingam	117,630	56.45%	56.45%
Independent	A. Venkatachalam	90,745	43.55%	
Margin of victory		26,885	12.90%	
Turnout		2,08,375	56.74%	
Registered electors		3,67,261		0.00%
INC win (new seat)				
