= Vanathi Srinivasan =

Indian politician (born 1970)

- வானதி சீனிவாசன்

Member of the Tamil Nadu Legislative Assembly
- In office 12 May 2021 – 4 May 2026
- Preceded by: Amman K. Arjunan
- Succeeded by: V. Senthilbalaji
- Constituency: Coimbatore South

President of the BJP Mahila Morcha
- Incumbent
- Assumed office 28 October 2020
- President: Jagat Prakash Nadda; Nitin Nabin
- Preceded by: Vijaya Rahatkar

Vice President of the Bharatiya Janata Party, Tamil Nadu
- In office 3 July 2020 – 28 October 2020
- President: L. Murugan

General Secretary of the Bharatiya Janata Party, Tamil Nadu
- In office 16 August 2014 – 3 July 2020
- President: Tamilisai Soundararajan; L. Murugan

Personal details
- Born: Vanathi Kandaswamy; 6 June 1970 (age 56) Coimbatore, Tamil Nadu, India
- Party: Bharatiya Janata Party
- Spouse: Su Srinivasan
- Children: 2
- Education: Dr. Ambedkar Government Law College, Chennai, University of Madras
- Profession: Politician, lawyer
- Website: vanathisrinivasan.com

Vanathi Srinivasan (/ʋaːnati/; born 6 June 1970) is an Indian politician and a lawyer from Tamil Nadu. She has practiced law in Madras High Court since 1993. She was a member of the Tamil Nadu Legislative Assembly from Coimbatore South Assembly constituency from 2021-2026. She served as the national president of the women's wing of the Bharatiya Janata Party from 2020-2026. She was also a member of the central election committee of party from 2022-2026.

== Personal life and education ==
Vanathi was born to Kandasamy and Poovathal in Uliyampalayam Village near Thondamuthur block in Coimbatore. She is the eldest in her family and she has a brother, Shiva Kumar. She did her schooling at Thondamuthur Higher Secondary School. Later, she did her UG program in chemistry from PSG College of Arts and Science. She graduated from Dr. Ambedkar Government Law College, Chennai in 1993 and completed her master's degree in law from the University of Madras in the branch of International Constitution in 1995. She married Srinivasan and they have two sons.

== Career ==
Vanathi is a lawyer by profession and has been practicing law in Chennai High Court for over two decades. She started her professional career in 1993, working for B. S. Gnanadesikan, Senior Advocate who was former President, Tamil Nadu Congress Committee. She was also a standing counsel for Southern Railway and Union Government. She was a former state secretary of BJP Tamil Nadu and also served as board member of Central Board of Film Certification. She contested 2011 and 2016 Tamil Nadu Legislative Assembly election as a BJP candidate.

== Political career ==
Vanathi has been a member of BJP since 1993 and held various positions in the party since 1999. She was appointed a State Secretary of the BJP Tamil Nadu in 2013 and continued until 2014 when she was appointed the General Secretary of the BJP Tamil Nadu, a post she continued till June 2020. Later, she was elevated as the state vice president of the state unit. On 28 October 2020, Bharatiya Janata Party (BJP) National President Jagat Prakash Nadda appointed her as the National President of the BJP Mahila Morcha. She was added into Central Election Committee of BJP in 2022.

She was first elected as MLA representing the BJP, as part of an alliance, and won the 2021 Tamil Nadu Legislative Assembly election from Coimbatore South constituency. She defeated actor Kamal Haasan of Makkal Needhi Maiam. Earlier in 2016, she secured 33,113 votes contesting from the same seat (2016 Tamil Nadu Legislative Assembly election). She is the BJP candidate from Coimbatore North for 2026 Tamil Nadu legislative assembly.

=== Elections contested ===
Year	Constituency	Party	Votes	%	Opponent		Votes	%	Margin
2011	Mylapore	BJP	6,911	4.84	ADMK	Rajalakshmi R	56.03	Lost	73,152
2016	Coimbatore South	BJP	26,675	21.57	ADMK	Amman K. Arjunan	38.94	Lost	26,675
2021	Coimbatore South	BJP	53,209	34.38	MNM	Kamal Haasan	33.26	Won	1,728
2026	Coimbatore North	BJP	49,722	21.99	TVK	V. Sampath Kumar	40.91	Lost	42,778

== Controversy ==
=== Legal cases ===
The AIADMK filed criminal cases of assault on Vanathi Srinivasan and six other members including the Hindu Munnani district President T. Guna in Coimbatore during the state assembly campaigns of 2016. The Madras High court granted her an anticipatory bail for the case in August 2016.

=== Tamil Nadu bifurcation proposal ===
Vanathi supports the idea of bifurcating Tamil Nadu to create a separate Kongu Nadu union territory.

== Social activism ==
She was the State Organiser for Sister Nivedita 150th Birth Anniversary Celebrations. She also initiated water conservation projects in Coimbatore to protect the local water bodies.
