= Kaliyur =

Village in India

- village
- Location in Tamil Nadu, India Kaliyur (India)
- Coordinates: 11.30°N 77.18°E
- Country: India
- State: Tamil Nadu
- District: Erode

Languages
  - Official: Tamil
- Time zone: UTC+5:30 (IST)
- PIN: 638 503
- Telephone code: 04285
- Vehicle registration: TN-36
- Coastline: 0 kilometres (0 mi)

Kaliyur is a village in Sathyamangalam taluk in Erode district, Tamil Nadu. This village is a boundary between Nilgiris (Lok Sabha constituency) and Tirupur (Lok Sabha constituency).
