= T. K. Nallappan =

Indian politician (died 2019)

MLA of Perundurai
- In office 1980–1985
- Preceded by: A. Ponnusamy
- Succeeded by: A. Ponnusamy

Personal details
- Born: 1931/32
- Died: 26 July 2019 (aged 87)
- Party: Communist Party of India

T. K. Nallappan was an Indian politician belonging to Communist Party of India. He was elected as a member of Tamil Nadu Legislative Assembly from Perundurai in 1980. He died on 26 July 2019 at the age of 87.
