= K. Thangavel =

Indian politician (1951–2020)

K.Thangavel

Member of Tamil Nadu Legislative Assembly
- In office 22 May 2011 – 21 May 2016
- Speaker(s): D. Jayakumar (2011-12); P. Dhanapal (2012-21)
- Preceded by: C. Govindasamy (for undivided Tiruppur)
- Succeeded by: S. Gunasekaran
- Constituency: Tiruppur South

Personal details
- Born: 6 October 1951 Tiruppur, Madras State (now Tamil Nadu), India
- Died: 13 September 2020 (aged 68) Coimbatore, Tamil Nadu, India
- Party: Communist Party of India (Marxist)

K. Thangavel (6 October 1951 – 13 September 2020) was an Indian politician who served as member of Tamil Nadu Legislative Assembly from 2011 to 2016.

== Life ==
Thangavel was born on 6 October 1951 in Tiruppur, Tamil Nadu.

He started his political career as a forefront leader of Centre of Indian Trade Unions in Tiruppur. He led a 127 day long strike of labor demanding dearness allowance in 1984. From 2006 to 2011 he was a local politician in Tiruppur.

In 2011 was elected as member of the Tamil Nadu Legislative Assembly from the Tiruppur South constituency. He represented the Communist Party of India (Marxist) party. He served until 2016. Thangavel was admitted to a local hospital in Coimbatore in late August 2020. He died from COVID-19 on 13 September 2020, twenty three days short of his 69th birthday during the COVID-19 pandemic in India.
