= Tiruppur North Assembly constituency =

One of the 234 State Legislative Assembly Constituencies in Tamil Nadu, in India

Coordinates: 11.146°N 77.353°E

Tiruppur (North)
- Constituency No. 113 for the Tamil Nadu Legislative Assembly

Constituency details
- Country: India
- Region: South India
- State: Tamil Nadu
- District: Tiruppur
- Lok Sabha constituency: Tiruppur
- Established: 2008
- Total electors: 3,15,863
- Reservation: None

Member of Legislative Assembly
- 17th Tamil Nadu Legislative Assembly
- Incumbent V. Sathyabama
- Party: TVK
- Elected year: 2026

Tiruppur North or 'Tiruppur (North)' is a state assembly constituency in Tiruppur district in Tamil Nadu, India newly formed after constituency delimitations in 2008. Its State Assembly Constituency number is 113. It is included in Tiruppur Lok Sabha constituency. Tiruppur North was one of 17 assembly constituencies to have VVPAT facility with EVMs in the 2016 Tamil Nadu Legislative Assembly election. It is one of the 234 State Legislative Assembly Constituencies in Tamil Nadu, in India.

== Members of Legislative Assembly ==
Year	Member	Political party
2011	M. S. M. Anandan	All India Anna Dravida Munnetra Kazhagam
2016	K. N. Vijayakumar	All India Anna Dravida Munnetra Kazhagam
2021	K. N. Vijayakumar	All India Anna Dravida Munnetra Kazhagam
2026	V. Sathyabama	Tamilaga Vettri Kazhagam

== Demographics ==
Kongu Vellalar Gounder, Senguntha Mudaliar and Adi Dravida communities are populous in this constituency.

== Election results ==
Vote share of winning candidates
2026	49.88%
2021	48.06%
2016	48.56%
2011	70.62%

=== 2026 ===
2026 Tamil Nadu Legislative Assembly election: Tiruppur (North)
Party	Candidate	Votes	%	±%
TVK	V. Sathyabama	131,401	49.88	New
AIADMK	M.S.M. Anandan	61,409	23.31	▼24.75
CPI	M. Ravi Alias M. Subramanian	53,964	20.48	▼10.58
NTK	R. Abinaya	13,157	4.99	▼4.81
NOTA	NOTA	1,078	0.41	▼0.51
BSP	L. James Reynold	380	0.14	New
Anna Puratchi Thalaivar Amma Dravida Munnetra Kazhagam	T. Krishnaswamy	351	0.13	New
Independent	G. Balakrishnan	247	0.09	New
Independent	K. Venkadaswamy	218	0.08	New
TVK	Py. Dhatchinamurthy	214	0.08	New
Independent	R. Vishnumoorthy	198	0.08	New
Independent	P. Ravi	196	0.07	New
Independent	K. Anand	193	0.07	New
Independent	M. Rangasamy	179	0.07	New
Independent	Ganishkar	172	0.07	New
Independent	S. Anandhakumar	100	0.04	New
Margin of victory		69,992	26.57	▲9.57
Turnout		2,63,457	83.41	▲21.18
Registered electors		3,15,863		▼63,276
TVK gain from AIADMK		Swing	▲49.88	

=== 2021 ===
2021 Tamil Nadu Legislative Assembly election: Tiruppur (North)
Party	Candidate	Votes	%	±%
AIADMK	K. N. Vijayakumar	113,384	48.06	−0.5
CPI	M. Ravi (Alias) Subramanian	73,282	31.06	+21.93
NTK	S. Easwaran	23,110	9.80	+8.46
MNM	S. Sivabalan	19,602	8.31	New
DMDK	M. Selvakumar	3,427	1.45	New
NOTA	NOTA	2,162	0.92	−0.65
Margin of victory		40,102	17.00	−0.19
Turnout		235,930	62.23	−4.40
Rejected ballots		8	0.00	
Registered electors		379,139		
AIADMK hold		Swing	-0.50	

=== 2016 ===
2016 Tamil Nadu Legislative Assembly election: Tiruppur (North)
Party	Candidate	Votes	%	±%
AIADMK	K. N. Vijayakumar	106,717	48.56	−22.06
DMK	M. P. Saminathan	68,943	31.37	+6.28
CPI	M. Subramanian	20,061	9.13	New
BJP	R. Chinnasamy	8,397	3.82	+1.95
KMDK	D. Ravichandharan	3,988	1.81	New
NOTA	NOTA	3,447	1.57	New
NTK	P. Sivakumr	2,931	1.33	New
PMK	M. Subramaniyam	1,750	0.80	New
Margin of victory		37,774	17.19	−28.35
Turnout		219,761	66.62	−7.76
Registered electors		329,853		
AIADMK hold		Swing	-22.06	

=== 2011 ===
2011 Tamil Nadu Legislative Assembly election: Tiruppur (North)
Party	Candidate	Votes	%	±%
AIADMK	M. S. M. Anandan	113,640	70.62	New
DMK	C. Govindasamy	40,369	25.09	New
BJP	A. Parthiban	3,009	1.87	New
Independent	P. Krishnasamy	1,595	0.99	New
Independent	D. Murugesan	847	0.53	New
Margin of victory		73,271	45.54	
Turnout		160,907	74.38	
Registered electors		216,324		
AIADMK win (new seat)				
