= Perundurai Assembly constituency =

State Legislative Assembly Constituency in Tamil Nadu

Coordinates: 11.28°N 77.58°E

Perundurai
- Constituency No. 103 for the Tamil Nadu Legislative Assembly

Constituency details
- Country: India
- Region: South India
- State: Tamil Nadu
- District: Erode
- Lok Sabha constituency: Tiruppur
- Established: 1957
- Total electors: 2,14,451

Member of Legislative Assembly
- 17th Tamil Nadu Legislative Assembly
- Incumbent Vacant

Perundurai is a state assembly constituency in Erode district in Tamil Nadu. Its State Assembly Constituency number is 103. It covers Perundurai and some parts of Erode City. The constituency has been in existence since 1957 election. Perundurai Assembly Constituency faced By - Elections in the year 1970, 1993 and 2026. It is one of the 234 State Legislative Assembly Constituencies in Tamil Nadu, in India.

Elections and winners in the constituency are listed below.

== Demographics ==
Kongu Vellalar Gounder , Senguntha Mudaliar Community is majorly presented in this Assembly constituency and , Vettuva Gounder and Adi Dravida communities are also populated in this constituency.

== Members of Legislative Assembly ==
Year	Member	Political party
1971 (Note: By-Election)	N. K. Palanisamy	Communist Party of India
1977	A. Ponnusamy	All India Anna Dravida Munnetra Kazhagam
1980	T. K. Nallappan	Communist Party of India
1984	A. Ponnusamy	All India Anna Dravida Munnetra Kazhagam
1989	V. N. Subramanian	All India Anna Dravida Munnetra Kazhagam
1991	V. N. Subramanian	All India Anna Dravida Munnetra Kazhagam
1993 (Note: By-Election)	V. P. Periasamy	All India Anna Dravida Munnetra Kazhagam
1996	N. Periyasamy	Communist Party of India
2001	K. S. Palanisamy	All India Anna Dravida Munnetra Kazhagam
2006	C. Ponnudurai	All India Anna Dravida Munnetra Kazhagam
2011	N. D. Venkatachalam	All India Anna Dravida Munnetra Kazhagam
2016	N. D. Venkatachalam	All India Anna Dravida Munnetra Kazhagam
2021	S. Jayakumar	All India Anna Dravida Munnetra Kazhagam
2026	S. Jayakumar	All India Anna Dravida Munnetra Kazhagam
2026 (Note: Upcoming by-election following S. Jayakumar's resignation on 25 May 2026 to join Tamilaga Vettri Kazhagam)		

== Election results ==
Vote share of winning candidates
2026	35.03%
2021	44.84%
2016	44.05%
2011	60.15%
2006	43.37%
2001	57.88%
1996	49.79%
1991	70.28%
1989	34.89%
1984	64.34%
1980	54.69%
1977	39.91%
1971	56.37%
1967	47.41%
1962	58.41%
1957	58.59%

=== 2026 By-election ===
2026 Tamil Nadu Legislative Assembly Bye-election: Perundurai
Party	Candidate	Votes	%	±%
TVK				
DMK				
AIADMK				
NTK				
Other parties	Other party candidates			
Independent	Independent candidates			
NOTA	None of the above			
Margin of victory				
Turnout				
Registered electors				
gain from		Swing		

=== 2026 ===
2026 Tamil Nadu Legislative Assembly election: Perundurai
Party	Candidate	Votes	%	±%
AIADMK	S. Jayakumar	70,302	35.03	▼9.81
DMK	N. D. Venkatachalam	60,609	30.20	New
TVK	V. P. Arunachalam	59,483	29.64	New
NTK	Ingur. C. Loganathan	6,468	3.22	▼2.20
NOTA	NOTA	812	0.40	▼0.23
Margin of victory		9,693	4.83	▼2.81
Turnout		2,01,079	93.76	▲10.45
AIADMK hold		Swing	▼9.81	

=== 2021 ===
2021 Tamil Nadu Legislative Assembly election: Perundurai
Party	Candidate	Votes	%	±%
AIADMK	S. Jayakumar	85,125	44.84	+0.79
KMDK	K. K. C. Balu	70,618	37.20	+0.15
NTK	C. Loganathan	10,294	5.42	+4.62
Independent	N. D. Venkatachalam	9,895	5.21	New
MNM	C. K. Nandhakumar	3,533	1.86	New
Independent	Shankarsamy	3,336	1.76	New
BSP	M. Thambi	1,620	0.85	+0.14
NOTA	NOTA	1,189	0.63	−0.47
Margin of victory		14,507	7.64	0.63
Turnout		189,843	83.31	−2.30
Rejected ballots		563	0.30	
Registered electors		227,870		
AIADMK hold		Swing	0.79	

=== 2016 ===
2016 Tamil Nadu Legislative Assembly election: Perundurai
Party	Candidate	Votes	%	±%
AIADMK	N. D. Venkatachalam	80,292	44.05	−16.1
DMK	K. P. Samy (A) P. Mohana Sundaram	67,521	37.05	New
KMDK	K. K. C. Balu	14,545	7.98	New
TMC(M)	V. P. Shanmugam	6,304	3.46	New
BJP	A. Chandrasekaran	2,625	1.44	New
NOTA	NOTA	1,991	1.09	New
PMK	P. Kumaresan	1,498	0.82	New
NTK	Loganathan	1,469	0.81	New
BSP	K. Sekar	1,306	0.72	−0.64
Margin of victory		12,771	7.01	−21.19
Turnout		182,263	85.62	1.72
Registered electors		212,885		
AIADMK hold		Swing	-16.10	

=== 2011 ===
2011 Tamil Nadu Legislative Assembly election: Perundurai
Party	Candidate	Votes	%	±%
AIADMK	N. D. Venkatachalam	89,960	60.15	+16.78
KNMK	K. K. C. Balu	47,793	31.96	New
BSP	G. Anbazhagan	2,033	1.36	+0.74
Independent	L. Antony Peter	1,464	0.98	New
JD(U)	K. Arumugam	1,371	0.92	New
Independent	P. Tamilarasu	1,026	0.69	New
Independent	N. P. Venkatachalam	925	0.62	New
Independent	T. V. Thangamuthu	845	0.56	New
Independent	P. Raju	823	0.55	New
IJK	M. Tamilselvan	779	0.52	New
Margin of victory		42,167	28.19	21.96
Turnout		149,561	83.90	7.76
Registered electors		178,269		
AIADMK hold		Swing	16.78	

=== 2006 ===
2006 Tamil Nadu Legislative Assembly election: Perundurai
Party	Candidate	Votes	%	±%
AIADMK	C. Ponnudurai	59,631	43.37	−14.51
CPI	N. Periyasamy	51,053	37.13	New
DMDK	M. Ravichandran	18,212	13.24	New
BJP	T. Shri Gandheeswaran	1,960	1.43	New
Independent	R. Palanisam	1,447	1.05	New
JD(U)	B. Devadasan	1,136	0.83	New
Independent	K. Krishnamoorthy	1,066	0.78	New
BSP	M. M. S. Subramaniam	850	0.62	New
Margin of victory		8,578	6.24	−19.21
Turnout		137,506	76.13	11.18
Registered electors		180,617		
AIADMK hold		Swing	-14.51	

=== 2001 ===
2001 Tamil Nadu Legislative Assembly election: Perundurai
Party	Candidate	Votes	%	±%
AIADMK	K. S. Palanisamy	72,133	57.88	+22.52
CNMK	N. Govindaswamy	40,421	32.43	New
MDMK	V. M. Kandasamy	6,528	5.24	−1.33
Independent	P. Raman	1,374	1.10	New
JD(S)	K. P. Sengodu	1,337	1.07	New
Independent	S. R. Devendara Manickam	1,020	0.82	New
Independent	P. Muthusamy	803	0.64	New
Margin of victory		31,712	25.45	11.02
Turnout		124,623	64.95	−5.16
Registered electors		191,912		
AIADMK gain from CPI		Swing	8.09	

=== 1996 ===
1996 Tamil Nadu Legislative Assembly election: Perundurai
Party	Candidate	Votes	%	±%
CPI	N. Periyasamy	60,587	49.79	+27.91
AIADMK	P. Periyasamy	43,036	35.36	−34.91
MDMK	V. M. Kandasamy	7,992	6.57	New
Independent	T. K. Periyasamy	2,292	1.88	New
BJP	A. Meivelsamy	1,228	1.01	−1.55
Margin of victory		17,551	14.42	−33.97
Turnout		121,693	70.11	1.14
Registered electors		179,713		
CPI gain from AIADMK		Swing	-20.49	

=== 1991 ===
1991 Tamil Nadu Legislative Assembly election: Perundurai
Party	Candidate	Votes	%	±%
AIADMK	V. N. Subramanian	77,277	70.28	+35.39
CPI	T. K. Naliappan	24,060	21.88	New
Independent	K. P. Sengodu	3,199	2.91	New
BJP	A. Chandra Sekaran	2,815	2.56	New
AAP	M. Subiramaniom	698	0.63	New
Margin of victory		53,217	48.40	35.46
Turnout		109,961	68.97	−8.36
Registered electors		164,972		
AIADMK hold		Swing	35.39	

=== 1989 ===
1989 Tamil Nadu Legislative Assembly election: Perundurai
Party	Candidate	Votes	%	±%
AIADMK	V. N. Subramanian	39,654	34.89	−29.45
INC	R. Arumugam	24,956	21.96	New
DMK	S. Kandappan	22,985	20.22	New
AIADMK	A. Ponnusamy	11,309	9.95	−54.39
Independent	P. S. Subramaniam Alias Mani	9,226	8.12	New
India Farmers and Tailers Party	K. Venkatachalam	1,406	1.24	New
Independent	V. T. R. Veerappa Gounder	922	0.81	New
Margin of victory		14,698	12.93	−17.07
Turnout		113,650	77.33	3.20
Registered electors		150,170		
AIADMK hold		Swing	-29.45	

=== 1984 ===
1984 Tamil Nadu Legislative Assembly election: Perundurai
Party	Candidate	Votes	%	±%
AIADMK	A. Ponnusamy	60,830	64.34	New
CPI	T. K. Nallappan	32,465	34.34	−20.35
Independent	M. Thangavelu	1,254	1.33	New
Margin of victory		28,365	30.00	15.57
Turnout		94,549	74.13	10.94
Registered electors		134,058		
AIADMK gain from CPI		Swing	9.65	

=== 1980 ===
1980 Tamil Nadu Legislative Assembly election: Perundurai
Party	Candidate	Votes	%	±%
CPI	T. K. Nallappan	44,210	54.69	+22.67
INC	N. K. P. Jaganathan	32,543	40.26	New
JP	T. C. Gopalan	2,183	2.70	New
Independent	Palaniappan	895	1.11	New
Independent	T. N. Kumarasamy Gounder	742	0.92	New
Margin of victory		11,667	14.43	6.55
Turnout		80,837	63.19	2.14
Registered electors		129,785		
CPI gain from AIADMK		Swing	14.78	

=== 1977 ===
1977 Tamil Nadu Legislative Assembly election: Perundurai
Party	Candidate	Votes	%	±%
AIADMK	A. Ponnusamy	30,574	39.91	New
CPI	N. K. Palanisamy	24,532	32.02	−24.34
JP	R. Ramalingam	12,803	16.71	New
DMK	R. Kandasamy	5,946	7.76	New
Independent	M. Chenni	2,752	3.59	New
Margin of victory		6,042	7.89	−4.84
Turnout		76,607	61.04	−6.08
Registered electors		127,223		
AIADMK gain from CPI		Swing	-16.46	

=== 1971 ===
1971 Tamil Nadu Legislative Assembly election: Perundurai
Party	Candidate	Votes	%	±%
CPI	N. K. Palanisamy	38,882	56.37	+46.7
Independent	K. Chinnasamy Gounder	30,100	43.63	New
Margin of victory		8,782	12.73	8.25
Turnout		68,982	67.12	−11.87
Registered electors		111,717		
CPI gain from SSP		Swing	8.96	

=== 1967 ===
1967 Madras Legislative Assembly election: Perundurai
Party	Candidate	Votes	%	±%
SSP	S. Balasubramanian	33,164	47.41	New
INC	N. N. S. Nandradiar	30,030	42.93	−15.48
CPI	N. T. Raju	6,761	9.66	−30.62
Margin of victory		3,134	4.48	−13.64
Turnout		69,955	78.99	−3.78
Registered electors		94,274		
SSP gain from INC		Swing	-11.00	

=== 1962 ===
1962 Madras Legislative Assembly election: Perundurai
Party	Candidate	Votes	%	±%
INC	N. Nallasenaapathi Sarkerai Manradiar	36,225	58.41	+17
CPI	N. K. Palanisamy	24,986	40.29	−18.3
Socialist Party (India)	U. R. Kumarasami	563	0.91	New
Margin of victory		11,239	18.12	0.95
Turnout		62,016	82.77	25.79
Registered electors		77,326		
INC gain from CPI		Swing	-0.17	

=== 1957 ===
1957 Madras Legislative Assembly election: Perundurai
Party	Candidate	Votes	%	±%
CPI	N. K. Palanisami	24,205	58.59	New
INC	V.R.A. Manicka Mudaliar	17,110	41.41	New
Margin of victory		7,095	17.17	
Turnout		41,315	56.99	
Registered electors		72,499		
CPI win (new seat)				
