= V. C. Arukutty =

Indian politician

Member of the Tamil Nadu Legislative Assembly
- In office 2011–2021
- Preceded by: Constituency established
- Succeeded by: P. R. G. Arunkumar
- Constituency: Kavundampalayam

Personal details
- Born: Kavundampalayam, Tamil Nadu, India
- Party: Dravida Munnetra Kazhagam (2022- present)
- Other political affiliations: All India Anna Dravida Munnetra Kazhagam (till 2022)

V. C. Arukutty is an Indian politician hailing from Vilankurichi, Coimbatore.

He was elected to the 14th Tamil Nadu Legislative Assembly from the Kavundampalayam constituency in 2011 and retained his seat in the elections of 2016.

He owns a VCA Jamap musical team. The team plays (didum) music for all their temple functions in Vilankurichi.

== Electoral career ==
=== Tamil Nadu Legislative Assembly Elections Contested ===
Election	Constituency	Party	Result	Vote %	Opposition Candidate	Opposition Party	Opposition vote %
2011	Kavundampalayam	AIADMK	Won	63.22	Subramanian T P	DMK	31.27
2016	Kavundampalayam	AIADMK	Won	40.70	Krishnan. R	DMK	37.76

Tamil Nadu Legislative Assembly
Preceded by Constituency established	Member of the Legislative Assembly for Kavundampalayam; 2011–2021	Succeeded by P. R. G. Arunkumar
