= P. R. G. Arunkumar =

Indian politician (born 1964)

Member of the Tamil Nadu Legislative Assembly
- In office 12 May 2021 – 4 May 2026
- Preceded by: V. C. Arukutty
- Succeeded by: Kanimozhi Santhosh
- Constituency: Kavundampalayam
- In office 23 May 2016 – 12 May 2021
- Preceded by: T. Malaravan
- Succeeded by: Amman K. Arjunan
- Constituency: Coimbatore (North)

Personal details
- Born: 20 June 1964 (age 62) Coimbatore
- Party: All India Anna Dravida Munnetra Kazhagam
- Spouse: A. Lathamani
- Children: A. Deeraj Ram Krishna (Son)
- Parent: Govidharaju (father)
- Occupation: Agriculture and Small Industry

P. R. Govindharaju Arunkumar is an Indian politician. He is a member of the All India Anna Dravida Munnetra Kazhagam party. He served as a member of the Tamil Nadu Legislative Assembly representing the Kavundampalayam Constituency from May 2021 to May 2026. He is the Coimbatore Suburban North District Organization Secretary of AIADMK. Previously he won in Coimbatore North constituency in the fifteenth legislative assembly.

== Electoral performance ==
=== Tamil Nadu Legislative Assembly Elections Contested ===
Election	Constituency	Party	Result	Vote %	Opposition Candidate	Opposition Party	Opposition vote %
2016	Coimbatore North	AIADMK	Won	38.94	S. Meenalogu	DMK	36.96
2021	Kavundampalayam	AIADMK	Won	44.19	Paiya R.Krishnan	DMK	41.00
2026	Kavundampalayam	AIADMK	Lost	28.66	Kanimozhi Santhosh	TVK	40.24
