= V. Sathyabama =

Indian politician

Member of Tamil Nadu Legislative Assembly
- Incumbent
- Assumed office 4 May 2026
- Preceded by: K. N. Vijayakumar
- Constituency: Tiruppur North

Member of Parliament, Lok Sabha
- In office 18 May 2014 – 20 May 2019
- Preceded by: C. Sivasamy
- Succeeded by: K. Subbarayan
- Constituency: Tiruppur

Personal details
- Born: 22 March 1972 (age 54) Erode, Tamil Nadu
- Party: Tamizhaga Vetri Kazhagam (2025 - Present)
- Other political affiliations: All India Anna Dravida Munnetra Kazhagam (2014–2025)
- Spouse: Shri. N. Vasu
- Children: 1
- Occupation: Agriculturalist
- As of 17 December, 2016

Vasu Sathyabama is an Indian politician and Former Member of Parliament elected from Tamil Nadu. She was elected to the 16th Lok Sabha from Tiruppur constituency as an Anna Dravida Munnetra Kazhagam candidate in the 2014 election.

Sathyabhama on 27 November 27 joined Tamilaga Vettri Kazhagam (TVK) at the party office in Panaiyur near Chennai in the presence of Vijay.
