= S. Jayakumar =

S. Jayakumar may refer to:

- S. Jayakumar (Indian politician)
- S. Jayakumar (Singaporean politician)
