= S. Duraisamy =

Indian politician

Member of the Tamil Nadu Legislative Assembly
- In office 1967 - 1972; 1971 - 1976
- Constituency: Tiruppur

Personal details
- Political party: Dravida Munnetra Kazhagam

S. Duraisamy was an Indian politician and former Member of the Legislative Assembly of Tamil Nadu. He was elected to the Tamil Nadu legislative assembly as a Dravida Munnetra Kazhagam candidate from Tiruppur constituency in 1967, and 1971 elections.

== Electoral performance ==
1971 Tamil Nadu Legislative Assembly election: Tiruppur
Party	Candidate	Votes	%	±%
DMK	S. Duraisamy	40,762	54.88%	4.82%
Independent	S. A. Khader	32,995	44.42%	
Independent	N. Rangasami Chettiar	524	0.71%	
Margin of victory		7,767	10.46%	−9.48%
Turnout		74,281	70.43%	−8.09%
Registered electors		111,543		
DMK hold		Swing	4.82%	

1967 Madras Legislative Assembly election: Tiruppur
Party	Candidate	Votes	%	±%
DMK	S. Duraisamy	35,518	50.05%	40.18%
INC	K. N. Palanisamy Gounder	21,373	30.12%	−21.77%
CPI	P. Murugesan	14,073	19.83%	
Margin of victory		14,145	19.93%	0.58%
Turnout		70,964	78.52%	0.21%
Registered electors		96,272		
DMK gain from INC		Swing	-1.84%	
