= Vellakinar =

- Neighbourhood
- Location in Tamil Nadu, India
- Coordinates: 11°05′01″N 76°57′40″E
- Country: India
- State: Tamil Nadu
- District: Coimbatore

Area
  - Total: 9.2 km^{2} (3.6 sq mi)

Population (2011)
  - Total: 15,998
  - Density: 1,700/km^{2} (4,500/sq mi)

Languages
  - Official: Tamil
- Time zone: UTC+5:30 (IST)

Vellakinar is a neighbourhood in Coimbatore in the Indian state of Tamil Nadu. Located in the western part of the state, it is part of the Coimbatore North taluk of Coimbatore district. It was a panchayat town till 2011, when it was integrated into the Coimbatore Corporation. Spread across an area of 9.2 km^{2} (3.6 sq mi), it had a population of 15,998 individuals as per the 2011 census.

== Geography and administration ==
Vellakinar is neighbourhood in Coimbatore in the Indian state of Tamil Nadu. It is part of the Coimbatore North taluk of Coimbatore district. It was a panchayat town till 2011, when it was integrated into the Coimbatore Corporation. Spread across an area of 9.2 km^{2} (3.6 sq mi), it is located in the western part of the state.

The region is sub-divided into wards, which are represented by councillors, who sit in the corporation council. The town forms part of the Kavundampalayam Assembly constituency that elects its member to the Tamil Nadu legislative assembly and the Coimbatore Lok Sabha constituency that elects its member to the Parliament of India.

== Demographics ==
As per the 2011 census, Vellakinar had a population of 15,998 individuals across 4,373 households. The population saw a marginal increase compared to the previous census in 2001 when 9,772 inhabitants were registered. The population consisted of 8,023 males and 7,975 females. About 1,483 individuals were below the age of six years. About 18.8% of the population belonged to scheduled castes. The entire population is classified as urban. The town has an average literacy rate of 86.7%.

About 41.5% of the eligible population were employed, of which majority were involved in agriculture and allied activities. Hinduism was the majority religion which was followed by 91.7% of the population, with Christianity (6.6%) and Islam (1.5%) being minor religions.
