= Kurudampalayam =

- Neighbourhoods
- Location in Tamil Nadu, India Kurudampalayam (India)
- Coordinates: 11°06′19″N 76°55′18″E
- Country: India
- State: Tamil Nadu
- Region: Kongu Nadu
- District: Coimbatore

Area
  - Total: 9 km^{2} (3.5 sq mi)

Population (2011)
  - Total: 18,749
  - Density: 2,100/km^{2} (5,400/sq mi)

Languages
  - Official: Tamil,
- Time zone: UTC+5:30 (IST)
- Postal code: 641017
- Vehicle registration: TN-38

Kurudampalayam is a census town in Coimbatore district in the Indian state of Tamil Nadu.

== Demographics ==
As of 2001 India census, Kurudampalayam had a population of 13,129. Males constitute 54% of the population and females 46%. Kurudampalayam has an average literacy rate of 76%, higher than the national average of 59.5%: male literacy is 82%, and female literacy is 68%. In Kurudampalayam, 9% of the population is under 6 years of age.
