= Tiruppur South Assembly constituency =

One of the 234 State Legislative Assembly Constituencies in Tamil Nadu

Coordinates: 11.086°N 77.347°E

Tiruppur (South)
- Constituency No. 114 for the Tamil Nadu Legislative Assembly

Constituency details
- Country: India
- Region: South India
- State: Tamil Nadu
- District: Tiruppur
- Lok Sabha constituency: Tiruppur
- Established: 2008
- Total electors: 1,97,104
- Reservation: None

Member of Legislative Assembly
- 17th Tamil Nadu Legislative Assembly
- Incumbent Balamurugan.S
- Party: TVK
- Alliance: TVK+
- Elected year: 2026

Tiruppur South or 'Tiruppur (South)' is a state assembly constituency in Tamil Nadu, India newly formed after constituency delimitations in 2008. Its State Assembly Constituency number is 114. It is included in Tiruppur Lok Sabha constituency. It is one of the 234 State Legislative Assembly Constituencies in Tamil Nadu.

== Members of Legislative Assembly ==
Year	Winner	Party
2011	K. Thangavel	Communist Party of India (Marxist)
2016	S. Gunasekaran	All India Anna Dravida Munnetra Kazhagam
2021	K. Selvaraj	Dravida Munnetra Kazhagam
2026	S. Balamurugan	Tamilaga Vettri Kazhagam

== Election results ==
Vote share of winning candidates
2026	41.04%
2021	43.59%
2016	44.68%
2011	61.63%

=== 2026 ===
2026 Tamil Nadu Legislative Assembly election: Tiruppur (South)
Party	Candidate	Votes	%	±%
TVK	S. Balamurugan	73,793	41.04	New
DMK	Dineshkumar.N	60,892	33.86	▼9.73
BJP	Thangaraj.S	34,617	19.25	New
NTK	Dinesh.P.N	6,956	3.87	▼3.57
NOTA	NOTA	644	0.36	▼0.30
AIFB	Kalimuthu.K	626	0.35	New
Independent	Dineshkumar	235	0.13	New
BSP	Rangasamy.S	234	0.13	New
Independent	Dineshkumar	203	0.11	New
Independent	Kesavamurthi.N	194	0.11	New
Indhu Dravida Makkal Katchi	Malarvizhi.G	170	0.09	New
Independent	Mahalingam.V	167	0.09	New
Independent	Vasanthamani.K	142	0.08	New
Independent	Venkatachalam.G	139	0.08	New
Independent	Dhanabal.D	132	0.07	New
Independent	Dineshkumar.V	116	0.06	New
Anna Puratchi Thalaivar Amma Dravida Munnetra Kazhagam	Vijayakumar.M	81	0.05	New
TVK	John Basha.A	76	0.04	New
Independent	Rathinavel.M	72	0.04	New
Independent	Amuthavel.P	69	0.04	New
Independent	Venkadasamy.K	60	0.03	New
Ganasangam Party of India	Mohamed Mubarak Ali	60	0.03	New
Independent	Dr. Ramakrishnan.S	50	0.03	New
Independent	Karthikadevi.K	45	0.03	New
Independent	Ramesh.S	41	0.02	New
Margin of victory		12,901	7.18	▲4.46
Turnout		1,79,814	91.23	▲28.56
Registered electors		1,97,104		▼79,379
TVK gain from DMK		Swing	▲41.04	

=== 2021 ===
2021 Tamil Nadu Legislative Assembly election: Tiruppur (South)
Party	Candidate	Votes	%	±%
DMK	K. Selvaraj	75,535	43.59%	+8.62
AIADMK	S. Gunasekaran	70,826	40.87%	−3.81
NTK	K. Shanmugasundaram	12,898	7.44%	+5.92
MNM	Anusha Ravi	9,934	5.73%	New
AMMK	A. Vishalakchi	1,757	1.01%	New
NOTA	NOTA	1,142	0.66%	−0.83
Margin of victory		4,709	2.72%	−6.99%
Turnout		173,276	62.67%	−3.61%
Rejected ballots		118	0.07%	
Registered electors		276,483		
DMK gain from AIADMK		Swing	-1.09%	

=== 2016 ===
2016 Tamil Nadu Legislative Assembly election: Tiruppur (South)
Party	Candidate	Votes	%	±%
AIADMK	S. Gunasekaran	73,351	44.68%	New
DMK	K. Selvaraj	57,418	34.98%	New
CPI(M)	K. Thangavel	13,597	8.28%	−53.35
BJP	N. Point Mani	7,640	4.65%	+1.06
SDPI	M. Basheer Ahamed	2,547	1.55%	−0.61
NTK	K. Shanmugasundaram	2,506	1.53%	New
NOTA	NOTA	2,445	1.49%	New
KMDK	K. Velumani	1,166	0.71%	New
PMK	Sayed Masnsoor Husain	1,093	0.67%	New
Margin of victory		15,933	9.71%	−21.59%
Turnout		164,166	66.29%	−6.59%
Registered electors		247,665		
AIADMK gain from CPI(M)		Swing	-16.95%	

=== 2011 ===
2011 Tamil Nadu Legislative Assembly election: Tiruppur (South)
Party	Candidate	Votes	%	±%
CPI(M)	K. Thangavel	75,424	61.63%	New
INC	K. Senthilkumar	37,121	30.33%	New
BJP	N. Pointmani	4,397	3.59%	New
SDPI	M. Mohmedamanulla	2,645	2.16%	New
Independent	L. M. Maswooth	944	0.77%	New
Margin of victory		38,303	31.30%	
Turnout		122,375	72.87%	
Registered electors		167,927		
CPI(M) win (new seat)				
