= S. Balamurugan =

Indian politician

Member of the Tamil Nadu Legislative Assembly
- In office 4 May 2026 – Incumbent
- Preceded by: K. Selvaraj
- Constituency: Tiruppur (South)

Personal details
- Party: TVK

S. Balamurugan is an Indian politician who is a Member of Legislative Assembly of Tamil Nadu. He was elected from Tiruppur (South) as a Tamilaga Vettri Kazhagam candidate in 2026 Elections.

== Elections contested ==
Election	Constituency	Party	Result	Vote %	Runner-up	Runner-up Party	Runner-up vote %	Ref.
2026 Tamil Nadu Legislative Assembly election	Tiruppur (South)	TVK	Won	41.04%	N. Dinesh Kumar	DMK	33.86%	
