= N. D. Venkatachalam =

Indian politician

Minister for Revenue and Disaster Management, Government of Tamilnadu
- In office 2012–2013
- Preceded by: K. A. Sengottaiyan
- Succeeded by: B. V. Ramanaa

Member of Legislative Assembly, Tamilnadu
- In office 14 May 2011 – 3 May 2021
- Preceded by: C. Ponnudurai
- Succeeded by: S. Jayakumar
- Constituency: Perundurai

Personal details
- Born: 12 May 1964 (age 62) Perundurai, Erode district, Tamilnadu
- Party: Dravida Munnetra Kazhagam(2021-2026)
- Other political affiliations: All India Anna Dravida Munnetra Kazhagam

N. D. Venkatachalam is an Indian politician and Ex-minister & Ex-member of the Tamil Nadu Legislative Assembly from the Perundurai constituency. He was refused party ticket in 2021 General election, so he contested as Independent candidate and lost. He was a member of Anna Dravida Munnetra Kazhagam party and now expelled from the party.

He joined Dravida Munnetra Kazhagam party on 11 July 2021, in the presence of Chief Minister M. K. Stalin.
