= Tiruppur Kulipalayam railway station =

Railway station in Tamil Nadu, India

Tiruppur Kulipalayam

General information
- Location: Nallur-Avinashi Ring Road, Koolipalayam, Tiruppur, Tiruppur Dist, Tamil Nadu, India
- Coordinates: 11.1443°N 77.3902°E
- Elevation: 294 metres (965 ft)
- System: Indian Railways station
- Owner: Indian Railways
- Line: Salem Junction–Shoranur Junction line
- Platforms: 2
- Tracks: 2

Construction
- Structure type: On ground

Other information
- Status: Active
- Station code: KUY
- Zone(s): Southern Railway zone
- Division(s): Salem
- Fare zone: Southern Railway zone
Location
- Location within India Location within Tamil Nadu

Tiruppur Kulipalayam railway station is a station in Tamil Nadu, India. It is located between Uttukuli and Tiruppur.
