= Tiruppur Assembly constituency =

Former constituency in Tamil Nadu, India

Coordinates: 11.11°N 77.36°E

Tiruppur
- Former constituency for the Tamil Nadu Legislative Assembly

Constituency details
- Country: India
- Region: South India
- State: Tamil Nadu
- District: Coimbatore
- Lok Sabha constituency: Coimbatore
- Established: 1951
- Abolished: 2008
- Total electors: 428,422
- Reservation: None

Tiruppur is the legislative Assembly constituency, that includes the city of Tiruppur. Tiruppur Assembly constituency was part of Coimbatore Lok Sabha constituency. It was a two-member constituency in the 1952 election.

== History ==
=== After 2008 ===
Owing to the enormous Urban agglomeration in Tiruppur city, Tiruppur Assembly constituency has now been bifurcated into Tiruppur North and Tiruppur South constituencies.

== Members of the Legislative Assembly ==
A total of 14 members from 13 elections have been elected from this constituency. It has elected five members each from Anna Dravida Munnetra Kazhagam, and four members each from Indian National Congress, and two members each from Dravida Munnetra Kazhagam, Communist Party of India, Communist Party of India (Marxist).

=== Madras State ===
| Year | Winner | Party | Votes | Runner-up | Party | Votes |
|---|---|---|---|---|---|---|
Madras State
| 1952 | 1) Arumugam; 2) Rangasami Naidu | Indian National Congress | 38,846; 30,991 | 3) Muthivanam; 4) Ramaswami | CPI; CPI | 21,772; 15,736 |
| 1957 | K. N. Palanisamy Gounder | Indian National Congress | 29,519 | V. Ponnulinga Gounder | CPI | 18,976 |
| 1962 | K. N. Palanisamy Gounder | Indian National Congress | 41,748 | Ponnulinga Gounder | CPI | 26,175 |
| 1967 | S. Duraisamy | Dravida Munnetra Kazhagam | 35,518 | K. N. Palanisamy Gounder | INC | 21,373 |
Tamil Nadu
| 1971 | S. Duraisamy | Dravida Munnetra Kazhagam | 40,762 | S. A. Khader | IND | 32,995 |
| 1977 | R. Manimaran | All India Anna Dravida Munnetra Kazhagam | 38,984 | A. Ganapathy | CPI | 24,569 |
| 1980 | R. Manimaran | All India Anna Dravida Munnetra Kazhagam | 63,371 | Mohan Kandasamy alias (P. Kandasamy Gounder) | INC(I) | 39,276 |
| 1984 | K. Subbarayan | Communist Party of India | 51,874 | R. Manimaran | ADMK | 50,634 |
| 1989 | C. Govindasamy | Communist Party of India | 55,481 | K. Subbarayan | CPI | 38,102 |
| 1991 | V. Palanisamy | All India Anna Dravida Munnetra Kazhagam | 92,509 | C. Govindasamy | CPM | 55,868 |
| 1996 | K. Subbarayan | Communist Party of India | 101,392 | C. Sivasami | ADMK | 60,337 |
| 2001 | C. Sivasami | All India Anna Dravida Munnetra Kazhagam | 127,224 | Lalitha Kumaramangalam | BJP | 80,668 |
| 2006 | C. Govindasamy | Communist Party of India | 105,713 | S. Duraisamy | MDMK | 94,754 |

== Election results ==
=== 2006 ===
2006 Tamil Nadu Legislative Assembly election: Tiruppur
| Party | Candidate | Votes | % | ±% |
|---|---|---|---|---|
| CPI(M) | C. Govindasamy | 106,073 | 43.44% | |
| MDMK | S. Duraisamy | 94,774 | 38.81% | |
| DMDK | K. Palanisamy | 27,217 | 11.15% | |
| BJP | A. M. Karthikkeyean | 9,476 | 3.88% | −34.10% |
| Independent | M. Shanger | 1,609 | 0.66% | |
| SP | K. Sukumaran | 1,004 | 0.41% | |
| Independent | B. Venkatesan | 966 | 0.40% | |
| Independent | A. Lingasamy | 781 | 0.32% | |
| Independent | K. Moorthi | 622 | 0.25% | |
| All India Forward Bloc (Subhasist) | S. Sundara Pandiyan | 616 | 0.25% | |
| Independent | Alagappan Periasamy | 444 | 0.18% | |
| Margin of victory | | 11,299 | 4.63% | −17.29% |
| Turnout | | 244,194 | 57.00% | 3.61% |
| Registered electors | | 428,422 | | |
| CPI(M) gain from AIADMK | | Swing | -16.47% | |

=== 2001 ===
2001 Tamil Nadu Legislative Assembly election: Tiruppur
| Party | Candidate | Votes | % | ±% |
|---|---|---|---|---|
| AIADMK | C. Sivasamy | 127,224 | 59.91% | 29.82% |
| BJP | Lalitha Kumaramangalam | 80,668 | 37.98% | 35.50% |
| Independent | S. Nagarajan | 1,878 | 0.88% | |
| Independent | P. Shanmugam | 1,060 | 0.50% | |
| Independent | R. Duraisamy | 809 | 0.38% | |
| Independent | K. Sivasubramaniam | 733 | 0.35% | |
| Margin of victory | | 46,556 | 21.92% | 1.45% |
| Turnout | | 212,372 | 53.39% | −9.76% |
| Registered electors | | 397,889 | | |
| AIADMK gain from CPI | | Swing | 9.35% | |

=== 1996 ===
1996 Tamil Nadu Legislative Assembly election: Tiruppur
| Party | Candidate | Votes | % | ±% |
|---|---|---|---|---|
| CPI | K. Subbarayan | 101,392 | 50.56% | |
| AIADMK | C. Sivasamy | 60,337 | 30.09% | −27.84% |
| MDMK | S. Duraisamy | 20,637 | 10.29% | |
| Independent | K. Sundramoorthy | 7,473 | 3.73% | |
| BJP | M. Palanisamy | 4,992 | 2.49% | −2.71% |
| PMK | C. Vadivel | 450 | 0.22% | |
| Independent | K. Gopal | 343 | 0.17% | |
| Independent | S. Nataraj | 340 | 0.17% | |
| Independent | C. Ravi | 282 | 0.14% | |
| Independent | R. Ramasamy | 255 | 0.13% | |
| Independent | R. Chinnakuti | 218 | 0.11% | |
| Margin of victory | | 41,055 | 20.47% | −2.47% |
| Turnout | | 200,542 | 63.15% | −0.80% |
| Registered electors | | 329,182 | | |
| CPI gain from AIADMK | | Swing | -7.37% | |

=== 1991 ===
1991 Tamil Nadu Legislative Assembly election: Tiruppur
| Party | Candidate | Votes | % | ±% |
|---|---|---|---|---|
| AIADMK | V. Palanisamy | 92,509 | 57.92% | 41.02% |
| CPI(M) | C. Govindasamy | 55,868 | 34.98% | 0.57% |
| BJP | R. Samiappan | 8,309 | 5.20% | |
| PMK | K. S. Babu | 459 | 0.29% | |
| Independent | T. V. Subramaniam | 288 | 0.18% | |
| Independent | Subbu Alias Subramaniam | 285 | 0.18% | |
| Independent | A. Sampath | 273 | 0.17% | |
| Independent | V. P. Mani | 200 | 0.13% | |
| Independent | M. Subramaniam | 126 | 0.08% | |
| Independent | K. A. Chelliah | 120 | 0.08% | |
| Independent | A. Lingasamy | 106 | 0.07% | |
| Margin of victory | | 36,641 | 22.94% | 12.16% |
| Turnout | | 159,707 | 63.95% | −9.97% |
| Registered electors | | 255,427 | | |
| AIADMK gain from CPI(M) | | Swing | 23.52% | |

=== 1989 ===
1989 Tamil Nadu Legislative Assembly election: Tiruppur
| Party | Candidate | Votes | % | ±% |
|---|---|---|---|---|
| CPI(M) | C. Govindasamy | 55,481 | 34.41% | |
| CPI | K. Subbarayan | 38,102 | 23.63% | |
| INC | R. Krishnan | 31,786 | 19.71% | |
| AIADMK | M. N. Palanisamy | 27,251 | 16.90% | −23.04% |
| TNC(K) | K. P. Govindasamy | 5,826 | 3.61% | |
| Independent | Mani Govindasamy | 1,124 | 0.70% | |
| Independent | K. Shanmugam | 309 | 0.19% | |
| Independent | S. Dharuman | 229 | 0.14% | |
| Independent | A. Balakrishnan | 197 | 0.12% | |
| Independent | A. Subramaniam | 162 | 0.10% | |
| Independent | R. Sampath | 160 | 0.10% | |
| Margin of victory | | 17,379 | 10.78% | 9.80% |
| Turnout | | 161,247 | 73.92% | 0.36% |
| Registered electors | | 222,283 | | |
| CPI(M) gain from CPI | | Swing | -6.51% | |

=== 1984 ===
1984 Tamil Nadu Legislative Assembly election: Tiruppur
| Party | Candidate | Votes | % | ±% |
|---|---|---|---|---|
| CPI | K. Subbarayan | 51,874 | 40.92% | |
| AIADMK | R. Manimaran | 50,634 | 39.94% | −37.42% |
| INC(J) | M. N. Palanisamy | 22,099 | 17.43% | |
| BJP | C. Palanisamy | 725 | 0.57% | |
| Independent | T. R. Subramanian | 290 | 0.23% | |
| Independent | M. G. B. Rathinasamy | 284 | 0.22% | |
| Independent | M. Palanisamy | 136 | 0.11% | |
| Independent | S. Sampath | 126 | 0.10% | |
| Independent | K. Selvaraj | 115 | 0.09% | |
| Independent | R. Rangasamy | 96 | 0.08% | |
| Independent | N. Natarajan | 94 | 0.07% | |
| Margin of victory | | 1,240 | 0.98% | −28.44% |
| Turnout | | 126,772 | 73.56% | 7.63% |
| Registered electors | | 182,124 | | |
| CPI gain from AIADMK | | Swing | -36.44% | |

=== 1980 ===
1980 Tamil Nadu Legislative Assembly election: Tiruppur
| Party | Candidate | Votes | % | ±% |
|---|---|---|---|---|
| AIADMK | R. Manimaran | 63,371 | 77.36% | 36.23% |
| INC | P. Kandasamy Gounder | 39,276 | 47.95% | |
| JP | S. Venkat Raj | 7,760 | 9.47% | |
| Independent | M. Palanisammi | 549 | 0.67% | |
| Independent | P. Vyapuri Mudaliar | 259 | 0.32% | |
| Margin of victory | | 24,095 | 29.41% | 14.21% |
| Turnout | | 81,914 | 65.93% | −2.26% |
| Registered electors | | 126,155 | | |
| AIADMK hold | | Swing | 36.23% | |

=== 1977 ===
1977 Tamil Nadu Legislative Assembly election: Tiruppur
| Party | Candidate | Votes | % | ±% |
|---|---|---|---|---|
| AIADMK | R. Manimaran | 38,984 | 41.13% | |
| CPI | A. Ganapathy | 24,569 | 25.92% | |
| DMK | K. Doraisamy | 16,414 | 17.32% | −37.56% |
| JP | K. Velusamy | 13,775 | 14.53% | |
| Independent | N. Palanisamy Alias Chinnakutty | 532 | 0.56% | |
| Independent | N. Natarajan | 507 | 0.53% | |
| Margin of victory | | 14,415 | 15.21% | 4.75% |
| Turnout | | 94,781 | 68.19% | −2.24% |
| Registered electors | | 140,401 | | |
| AIADMK gain from DMK | | Swing | -13.74% | |

=== 1971 ===
1971 Tamil Nadu Legislative Assembly election: Tiruppur
| Party | Candidate | Votes | % | ±% |
|---|---|---|---|---|
| DMK | S. Duraisamy | 40,762 | 54.88% | 4.82% |
| Independent | S. A. Khader | 32,995 | 44.42% | |
| Independent | N. Rangasami Chettiar | 524 | 0.71% | |
| Margin of victory | | 7,767 | 10.46% | −9.48% |
| Turnout | | 74,281 | 70.43% | −8.09% |
| Registered electors | | 111,543 | | |
| DMK hold | | Swing | 4.82% | |

=== 1967 ===
1967 Madras Legislative Assembly election: Tiruppur
| Party | Candidate | Votes | % | ±% |
|---|---|---|---|---|
| DMK | S. Duraisamy | 35,518 | 50.05% | 40.18% |
| INC | K. N. Palanisamy Gounder | 21,373 | 30.12% | −21.77% |
| CPI | P. Murugesan | 14,073 | 19.83% | |
| Margin of victory | | 14,145 | 19.93% | 0.58% |
| Turnout | | 70,964 | 78.52% | 0.21% |
| Registered electors | | 96,272 | | |
| DMK gain from INC | | Swing | -1.84% | |

=== 1962 ===
1962 Madras Legislative Assembly election: Tiruppur
| Party | Candidate | Votes | % | ±% |
|---|---|---|---|---|
| INC | K. N. Palanisamy Gounder | 41,748 | 51.89% | −5.58% |
| CPI | Ponnulinge Gounder | 26,175 | 32.53% | |
| DMK | S. Duraisamy | 7,944 | 9.87% | |
| SWA | Sundaram | 4,592 | 5.71% | |
| Margin of victory | | 15,573 | 19.36% | −1.17% |
| Turnout | | 80,459 | 78.31% | 23.89% |
| Registered electors | | 106,491 | | |
| INC hold | | Swing | -5.58% | |

=== 1957 ===
1957 Madras Legislative Assembly election: Tiruppur
| Party | Candidate | Votes | % | ±% |
|---|---|---|---|---|
| INC | K. N. Palanisamy Gounder | 29,519 | 57.47% | |
| CPI | V. Ponnulinga Gounder | 18,976 | 36.94% | |
| Independent | C. Duraisami | 2,873 | 5.59% | |
| Margin of victory | | 10,543 | 20.52% | |
| Turnout | | 51,368 | 54.42% | |
| Registered electors | | 94,395 | | |
| INC win (new seat) | | | | |

=== 1952 ===
1952 Madras Legislative Assembly election: Tiruppur
| Party | Candidate | Votes | % | ±% |
|---|---|---|---|---|
| INC | Arumugam | 38,846 | 23.89% | 23.89% |
| INC | Rangaswami Naidu | 30,991 | 19.06% | 19.06% |
| CPI | Muthivanam | 21,772 | 13.39% | |
| CPI | Ramaswami | 15,736 | 9.68% | |
| Socialist Party (India) | Nagaparnadi | 15,193 | 9.35% | |
| Independent | Kanakarathinam | 13,551 | 8.34% | |
| Socialist Party (India) | Palaniswami Gounder | 12,098 | 7.44% | |
| Independent | Muthukumaraswami Gounder | 10,110 | 6.22% | |
| RPI | Pandaram | 4,278 | 2.63% | |
| Margin of victory | | 7,855 | 4.83% | |
| Turnout | | 162,575 | 98.41% | |
| Registered electors | | 165,201 | | |
| INC win (new seat) | | | | |
