= Goundampalayam, Erode =

Village in India

Goundampalayam
- village
- Location in Tamil Nadu, India Goundampalayam (India)
- Coordinates: 11.17°N 77.62°E
- Country: India
- State: Tamil Nadu

Languages
  - Official: Tamil
- Time zone: UTC+5:30 (IST)

Goundampalayam (also spelled Kavundampalayam or Koundampalayam) is a small village under the panchayat town of Chennimalai in Erode district in the state of Tamil Nadu, India.

== Location ==
Goundampalayam can be reached by bus from Chennimalai town (Bus No: C4). Goundampalayam is 10 kilometers from Chennimalai and 9 kilometers from the Salem to Coimbatore National Highway (NH 47). It is near a railway track between the railway stations Ingur and Vijayamangalam. All trains from Erode to Coimbatore go by this route.

Goundampalayam has an average elevation of 330 metres (1082 feet).

== Demographics ==
As of the 2001 Indian census, Goundampalayam had a population of 125. Males constitute 51% of the population and females 49%. Goundampalayam has an average literacy rate of 60%, higher than the national average of 59.5%; with male literacy at 83% and female literacy at 67%. 10% of the population is under 6 years of age.

== Climate ==
The climate in general is dry and characterised by scant rainfall. Unlike the nearby Coimbatore district which is blessed with a healthy climate, Goundanpalayam village has dry weather throughout the year except during the monsoons. The Palghat Gap in the Western Ghats, which has a moderating effect on the climate of Coimbatore district, does not render much help in bringing down the dry climate in this area. The cool moist wind that gushes out of the west coast through Palghat gap, loses its coolness and becomes dry by the time it crosses Coimbatore district and reaches Goundampalayam.

Generally the first two months of the year are pleasant, but in March the temperature begins to rise, which persists till the end of May. The highest temperatures are normally recorded during May. The showers during this period do not provide much relief from the oppressive heat; however there is a slight improvement in the climate during the June–August period. During the pre-monsoon period, the temperature reverses its trend. By September the sky gets heavily overcast, although the rains are meagre. The northeast monsoon sets in vigorously only during October–November, and by December the rains disappear, rendering the climate clear but pleasant.

== Economy ==
Goundampalayam is well known for handloom, and powerloom textile products and readymade garments. Products such as cotton Saris, bed spreads, carpets, lungi, printed fabrics, towels and dhoti are marketed here in bulk. These products are exported to other states and countries.

== Notable people ==
- Actor Karthi has family ties to Goundampalayam in Erode district through his wife Ranjini Chinnaswamy, and often visits.
