= Uttukuli railway station =

Railway station in Tamil Nadu, India

Uttukuli

General information
- Location: Uthukuli Railway Station, Tamil Nadu, India
- Coordinates: 11.1547°N 77.4456°E
- Elevation: 300 metres (980 ft)
- System: Indian Railways station
- Owner: Indian Railways
- Line: Salem Junction–Shoranur Junction line
- Platforms: 2
- Tracks: 2

Construction
- Structure type: On ground

Other information
- Status: Active
- Station code: UKL
- Zone(s): Southern Railway zone
- Division(s): Salem
- Fare zone: Southern Railway zone
Location
- Location within India Location within Tamil Nadu

Uttukuli railway station (station code: UKL) is an NSG–6 category Indian railway station in Salem railway division of Southern Railway zone. It is a railway station in Uthukuli, in Tiruppur district of Tamil Nadu, India. It is located between Vijayamangalam and Tiruppur Kulipalayam.
