= C. Sivasamy =

Indian politician

C. Sivasami is an Indian politician and incumbent Member of Indian Parliament elected from Tamil Nadu.

== MLA ==
He was elected to the Tamil Nadu legislative assembly as an Anna Dravida Munnetra Kazhagam candidate from Tiruppur constituency in 2001 election. He lost the election from the same constituency in 1996 election against the Communist Party of India candidate K. Subbarayan.

== Member of Parliament ==
He was elected to the Lok Sabha from Tiruppur constituency as an Anna Dravida Munnetra Kazhagam candidate in 2009 election.
