= S. Jayakumar (Indian politician) =

Indian politician

Member of the Tamil Nadu Legislative Assembly
- In office 12 May 2021 – 25 May 2026
- Preceded by: N. D. Venkatachalam
- Constituency: Perundurai

Personal details
- Party: Tamilaga Vettri Kazhagam (since 25 May 2026)
- Other political affiliations: All India Anna Dravida Munnetra Kazhagam (until 25 May 2026)

S. Jayakumar is an Indian politician who is a Member of Legislative Assembly of Tamil Nadu. He was elected from Perundurai as an All India Anna Dravida Munnetra Kazhagam candidate in 2021.

== Elections contested ==
2026 Tamil Nadu Legislative Assembly election: Perundurai
| Party | Candidate | Votes | % | ±% |
|---|---|---|---|---|
| AIADMK | S. Jayakumar | 70,302 | 35.03 | ▼9.81 |
| DMK | N. D. Venkatachalam | 60,609 | 30.20 | New |
| TVK | V. P. Arunachalam | 59,483 | 29.64 | New |
| NTK | Ingur. C. Loganathan | 6,468 | 3.22 | ▼2.20 |
| Independent | C. Venkatachalam | 878 | 0.44 | New |
| NOTA | NOTA | 812 | 0.40 | ▼0.23 |
| Margin of victory | | 9,693 | 4.83 | ▼2.81 |
| Turnout | | 2,01,079 | 93.76 | ▲10.45 |
| Registered electors | | 2,14,451 | | ▼13,419 |
| AIADMK hold | | Swing | ▼9.81 | |

2021 Tamil Nadu Legislative Assembly election: Perundurai
| Party | Candidate | Votes | % | ±% |
|---|---|---|---|---|
| AIADMK | S. Jayakumar | 85,125 | 44.84% | +0.79 |
| KMDK | K. K. C. Balu | 70,618 | 37.20% | +0.15 |
| NTK | C. Loganathan | 10,294 | 5.42% | +4.62 |
| Independent | N. D. Venkatachalam | 9,895 | 5.21% | New |
| MNM | C. K. Nandhakumar | 3,533 | 1.86% | New |
| Independent | Shankarsamy | 3,336 | 1.76% | New |
| BSP | M. Thambi | 1,620 | 0.85% | +0.14 |
| NOTA | NOTA | 1,189 | 0.63% | −0.47 |
| Margin of victory | | 14,507 | 7.64% | 0.63% |
| Turnout | | 189,843 | 83.31% | −2.30% |
| Rejected ballots | | 563 | 0.30% | |
| Registered electors | | 227,870 | | |
| AIADMK hold | | Swing | 0.79% | |

== 2026 election ==
S. Jayakumar is a candidate in the 2026 Tamil Nadu Legislative Assembly election from the Perundurai Assembly constituency, representing the All India Anna Dravida Munnetra Kazhagam.

According to his election affidavit, he reported income over the previous five financial years, while his spouse, R. Shanmugapriya, also declared income during the same period.

=== Assets and liabilities ===
As per the affidavit, Jayakumar declared total movable assets worth approximately ₹1.11 crore, while his spouse reported movable assets of about ₹1.87 crore. These include cash in hand, bank deposits, insurance investments, vehicles, and gold jewellery.

The affidavit indicates that he owns multiple vehicles, including a sport utility vehicle, utility vehicles, and two-wheelers. He declared gold jewellery holdings of 25 sovereigns, while his spouse declared 75 sovereigns of gold jewellery.

In terms of immovable assets, the affidavit states that his spouse owns agricultural land in Erode district, while Jayakumar owns non-agricultural land in Ponmudi village.

=== Criminal record ===
The affidavit indicates that one criminal case was pending against Jayakumar at the time of nomination, related to allegations of unlawful assembly and wrongful restraint during a public protest. He declared that he has not been convicted in any criminal case.
