= Kanimozhi Santhosh =

Indian politician (born 1988/89)

Member of the Tamil Nadu Legislative Assembly
- Incumbent
- Assumed office 4 May 2026
- Preceded by: P. R. G. Arunkumar
- Constituency: Kavundampalayam

Personal details
- Born: 24 May 1988 or 1989 (age 37–38) Narasimhanaickenpalayam, Coimbatore, Tamil Nadu, India
- Party: Tamilaga Vettri Kazhagam
- Spouse: Santhosh Kumar
- Children: 2 sons (Adithya Veera, Anirudh Dheera)
- Education: Tamil Nadu Dr. Ambedkar Law University
- Occupation: Politician, Astrologer, Legal Consultant

Kanimozhi Santhosh (born 1988 or 1989) is an Indian politician from Tamil Nadu. She is a Member of the Legislative Assembly representing the Kavundampalayam constituency under the Tamilaga Vettri Kazhagam ticket. She secured her election during the 2026 Tamil Nadu Legislative Assembly election, defeating the incumbent P. R. G. Arunkumar.

== Personal life ==
Kanimozhi married Santhosh Kumar, a businessman. They have two sons.

== Professional career ==
Prior to entering active politics, Kanimozhi Santhosh practiced as a legal consultant and a high-profile celebrity astrologer under her professional venture "Astro Maagic". She holds a Bachelor of Laws (LLB) degree from Tamil Nadu Dr. Ambedkar Law University.

Through her digital platforms, she garnered a significant online media presence making social and political astrological forecasts. She gained widespread media traction for accurately predicting that Vijay's political entry through Tamilaga Vettri Kazhagam would establish him as a formidable opposition force in the 2026 elections prior to officially joining the party and being fielded as a star candidate in Coimbatore.

== Elections Contested and Results ==
Elections	Constituency	Result	Vote %	Opposition Candidate	Opposition Party	Opposition vote %
2026	Kavundampalayam	Won	40.24%	P. R. G. Arunkumar	AIADMK	28.66%
