= K. Subbarayan =

Indian politician

Leader of the Communist party of India in the Lok Sabha
- Incumbent
- Assumed office 23 May 2019
- Preceded by: C. N. Jayadevan

Member of Parliament, Lok Sabha
- Incumbent
- Assumed office 23 May 2019
- Preceded by: V. Sathyabama
- Constituency: Tiruppur
- In office 16 May 2004 – 17 May 2009
- Preceded by: C. P. Radhakrishnan
- Succeeded by: P.R. Natarajan
- Constituency: Coimbatore

Personal details
- Born: 10 August 1947 (age 79) Tiruppur, Madras Province, British India (now Tamil Nadu, India)
- Party: Communist Party of India
- Spouse: R. Manimekalai
- Children: 1 son
- As of 22 September, 2006

K. Subbarayan (born 10 August 1947) is a member of the 17th Lok Sabha of India. He represents the Tiruppur Lok Sabha constituency of Tamil Nadu and is a member of the Communist Party of India (CPI). He represented the neighboring Coimbatore Lok Sabha constituency of in the 14th Lok Sabha. He was also elected twice for the Tamil Nadu legislative assembly from the Tiruppur assembly constituency.

The CPI in Tamil Nadu allied with the Dravida Munnetra Kazhagam as part of the Democratic Progressive Alliance for the 2004 Lok Sabha elections. The party was allocated two seats to contest under the terms of agreement, from which Subbarayan was selected to fight Coimbatore. The seat, whose economy was largely based on a textile industry that was contracting due to recession, had been won in 1998 and 1999 by C. P. Radhakrishnan of the Bharatiya Janata Party. Aside from issues relating to unemployment, a major local issue in the 2004 campaign was the situation regarding drought and water supplies. Radhakrishnan's past success had come from exploiting communal tensions caused by a bombing campaign in the area by the now-banned Islamic fundamentalist Al Ummah group but this was no longer a significant issue.

Subbarayan had previously been elected to the Tamil Nadu legislative assembly from the Tiruppur constituency for the periods 1984-89 and 1996-2001. Tiruppur is Subbarayan's home town. He was runner-up to C. Govindasamy of the Communist Party of India (Marxist) in the 1989 election.

Subbarayan decided not to contest the 2016 state assembly elections.
