= M. S. M. Anandan =

Indian politician

Member of the Tamil Nadu Legislative Assembly
- In office 12 May 2021 – 4 May 2026
- Preceded by: Karaipudur A. Natarajan
- Constituency: Palladam
- In office 16 May 2011 – 16 May 2016
- Preceded by: Constituency Established
- Succeeded by: K. N. Vijayakumar
- Constituency: Tiruppur North

Personal details
- Party: Tamilaga Vettri Kazhagam (since June 2026-Present)
- Other political affiliations: All India Anna Dravida Munnetra Kazhagam
- Parent: M.S. Muthu (father)

M. S. Muthu Anandan is an Indian politician and is a member of the 16th Tamil Nadu Legislative Assembly from Palladam constituency. He was previously an MLA from Tiruppur North. The elections of 2016 resulted in his constituency being won by K. N. Vijayakumar.

He represents the All India Anna Dravida Munnetra Kazhagam party.

He was the Minister for Forests, Hindu Religious and Charitable Endowments in the Government of Tamil Nadu.

He Joined TVK in June 2026.

== Electoral performance ==
2021 Tamil Nadu Legislative Assembly election: Palladam
Party	Candidate	Votes	%	±%
AIADMK	M. S. M. Anandan	126,903	48.86%	+1.85
MDMK	K. Muthu Rathinam	94,212	36.28%	+2.79
NTK	S. Subramanian	20,524	7.90%	+6.68
MNM	G. Mayilsamy	10,227	3.94%	New
AMMK	R. Jothimani	2,618	1.01%	New
NOTA	NOTA	1,802	0.69%	−0.95
Margin of victory		32,691	12.59%	−0.93%
Turnout		259,709	66.63%	−5.05%
Rejected ballots		98	0.04%	
Registered electors		389,786		
AIADMK hold		Swing	1.85%	

2011 Tamil Nadu Legislative Assembly election: Tiruppur (North)
Party	Candidate	Votes	%	±%
AIADMK	M. S. M. Anandan	113,640	70.62	New
DMK	C. Govindasamy	40,369	25.09	New
BJP	A. Parthiban	3,009	1.87	New
Independent	P. Krishnasamy	1,595	0.99	New
Independent	D. Murugesan	847	0.53	New
Margin of victory		73,271	45.54	
Turnout		160,907	74.38	
Registered electors		216,324		
AIADMK win (new seat)				
