= K. Selvaraj (DMK politician) =

Indian politician

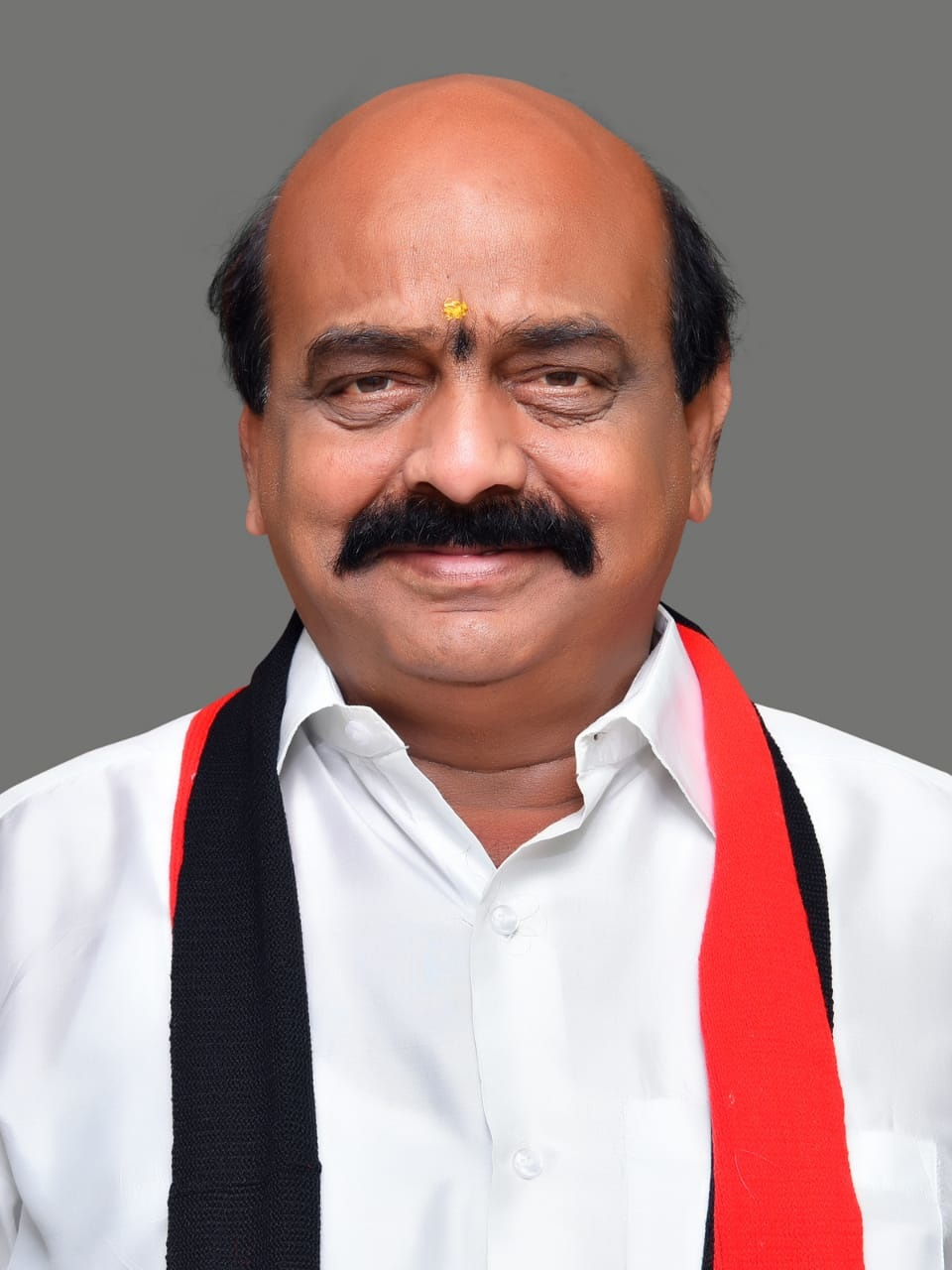

Member of the Tamil Nadu Legislative Assembly
- In office 12 May 2021 – 10 May 2026
- Preceded by: S. Gunasekaran
- Succeeded by: S. Balamurugan
- Constituency: Tiruppur (South)

Personal details
- Party: Dravida Munnetra Kazhagam

K. Selvaraj is an Indian politician who is a Member of Legislative Assembly of Tamil Nadu. He was elected from Tiruppur (South) as a Dravida Munnetra Kazhagam candidate in 2021. And He is First Mayor of Tirupur City Municipal Corporation

== Elections contested ==
Election	Constituency	Party	Result	Vote %	Runner-up	Runner-up Party	Runner-up vote %	Ref.
2021 Tamil Nadu Legislative Assembly election	Tiruppur (South)	DMK	Won	43.59%	S. Gunasekaran	AIADMK	40.87%	
