= Seerappalayam =

Village in Tamil Nadu, India

Coordinates: 10°53′52″N 76°58′54″E

Seerappalayam is a village in Coimbatore district of Tamil Nadu state in India. As of the 2011 Census of India, it had a population of 5,881 across 1,646 households.
