= R. Doraisamy =

Indian politician

R. Doraisamy, also known as Challenger Dorai, is an Indian politician and was a member of the 14th Tamil Nadu Legislative Assembly from the Coimbatore South constituency. He represented the All India Anna Dravida Munnetra Kazhagam party. In 2024, he joined the Bharatiya Janata Party in the presence of Tamil Nadu BJP chief K. Annamalai and Rajeev Chandrasekhar.

The elections of 2016 resulted in his constituency being won by Amman K. Arjunan.
