= K. N. Vijayakumar =

Indian politician

Member of the Tamil Nadu Legislative Assembly
- In office 19 May 2016 – 5 May 2026
- Preceded by: M. S. M. Anandan
- Succeeded by: V. Sathyabama
- Constituency: Tiruppur North

Personal details
- Born: Vijayakumar; 10 July 1957 (age 69)
- Party: All India Anna Dravida Munnetra Kazhagam
- Parent: Karuppasami Gounder (father)
- Occupation: Politician

K. N. Vijayakumar is a politician from Tamil Nadu, India. He was elected from the Tiruppur (North) constituency to the 15th Tamil Nadu Legislative Assembly as a member of the All India Anna Dravida Munnetra Kazhagam political party in the 2016 Tamil Nadu legislative assembly elections.
