= Keeranatham =

Coimbatore Tamil Nadu India

- Keeranatham

Keeranatham is a small town part of the Coimbatore district in the Indian state of Tamil Nadu.

Close to many IT parks and industrial zones, Keeranatham has undergone significant development. Keeranatham is likely to be called as IT Hub of Coimbatore Region with presence of IT-SEZ . It is 4 km away from Saravanampatti which is a connector with Sathyamangalam Road. SEZ has a village road connecting Saravanampatti which is surrounded by agriculture lands that are being transformed into apartments and shops. A view of Western Ghats surrounding the campus is an added advantage.
