= Amman K. Arjunan =

Indian politician

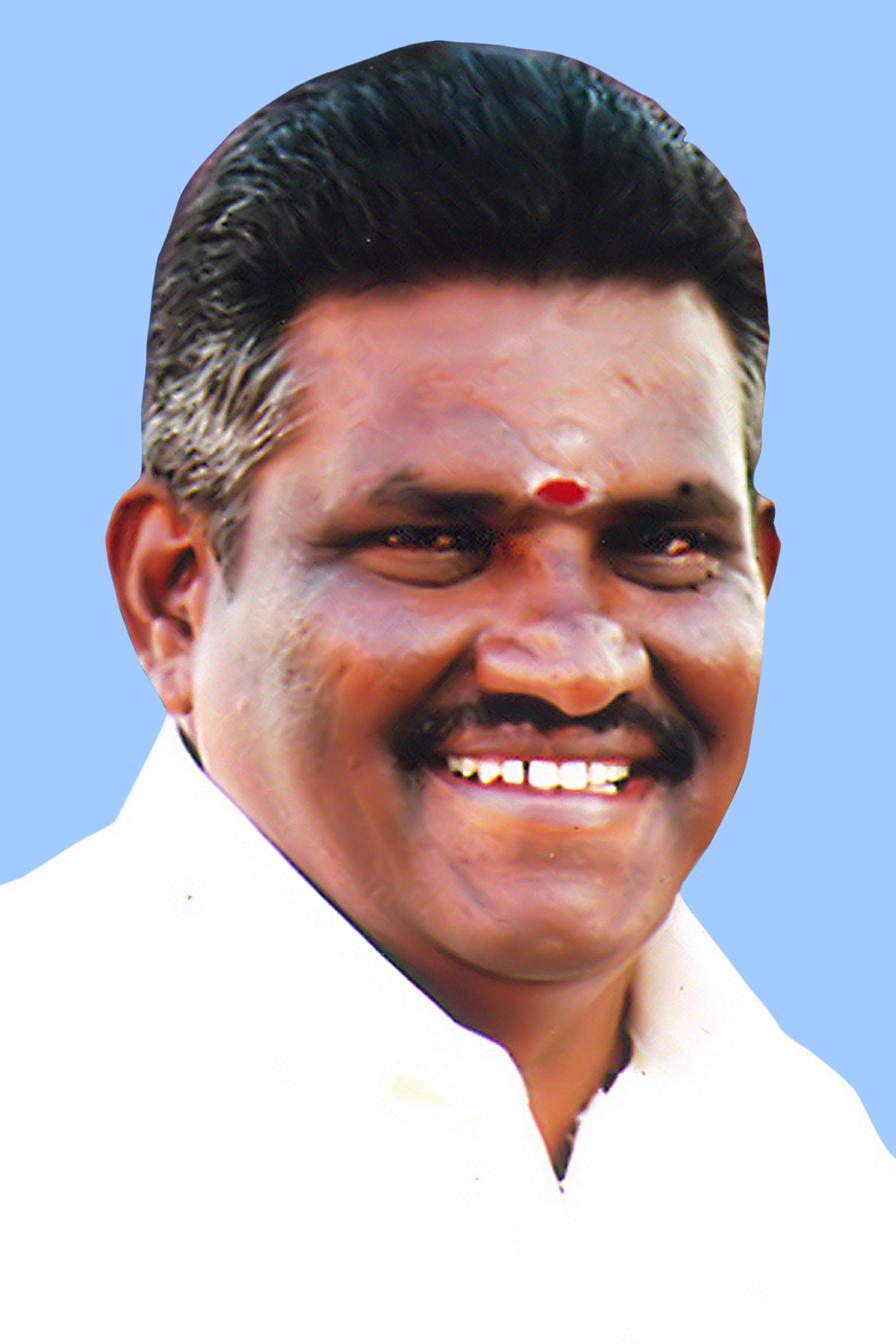

Member of the Tamil Nadu Legislative Assembly
- In office 12 May 2021 – 4 May 2026
- Preceded by: P. R. G. Arunkumar
- Succeeded by: V. Sampath Kumar
- Constituency: Coimbatore North
- In office 23 May 2016 – 6 May 2021
- Preceded by: R. Doraisamy
- Succeeded by: Vanathi Srinivasan
- Constituency: Coimbatore (South)

Personal details
- Party: All India Anna Dravida Munnetra Kazhagam

Amman K. Arjunan is an Indian politician and businessman currently Member of the Legislative Assembly of Tamil Nadu from Coimbatore North state assembly constituency. Previously he won in Coimbatore South constituency in the fifteenth legislative assembly. He contested as All India Anna Dravida Munnetra Kazhagam candidate and won 2021 Tamil Nadu Legislative Assembly election by 4001 votes.

He is native of Coimbatore and is the incumbent Coimbatore Urban District Secretary of the All India Anna Dravida Munnetra Kazhagam.

== Electoral performance ==
=== Tamil Nadu Legislative Assembly Elections Contested ===
Election	Constituency	Party	Result	Vote %	Opposition Candidate	Opposition Party	Opposition vote %
2016	Coimbatore South	AIADMK	Won	38.94	Mayura Jayakumar S	INC	27.60
2021	Coimbatore North	AIADMK	Won	40.15	Shanmugasundaram V. M	DMK	38.18
2026	Coimbatore South	AIADMK	Lost			DMK	
