= S. Gunasekaran (AIADMK politician) =

Indian politician (1966 or 1967–2025)

Member of the Tamil Nadu Legislative Assembly for Tiruppur (South)
- In office 2016–2021
- Preceded by: K. Thangavel
- Succeeded by: K. Selvaraj

Personal details
- Born: 1966 or 1967 Madras State (now Tamil Nadu), India
- Died: 9 June 2025 (aged 58) Coimbatore, Tamil Nadu, India
- Party: All India Anna Dravida Munnetra Kazhagam

S. Gunasekaran (1966 or 1967 – 9 June 2025) was an Indian politician and a member of the 15th Tamil Nadu Legislative Assembly from the Tiruppur South constituency. He represented the All India Anna Dravida Munnetra Kazhagam party. Gunasekaran died on 9 June 2025, at the age of 58.

== See also ==
- 2016 Tamil Nadu Legislative Assembly election
