= Ingur railway station =

Railway station in Tamil Nadu, India

Ingur

General information
- Location: Ingur, Erode, Tamil Nadu, India
- Coordinates: 11.2257°N 77.5875°E
- Elevation: 282 metres (925 ft)
- System: Indian Railways station
- Owner: Indian Railways
- Line: Salem Junction–Shoranur Junction line
- Platforms: 2
- Tracks: 2

Construction
- Structure type: On ground

Other information
- Status: Active
- Station code: IGR
- Zone(s): Southern Railway zone
- Division(s): Salem
- Fare zone: Southern Railway zone
Location
- Location within India Location within Tamil Nadu

Ingur railway station (station code: IGR) is an NSG–6 category Indian railway station in Salem railway division of Southern Railway zone. It is located between Perundurai and Vijayamangalam.
