= N. K. Palanisamy =

Indian politician

N. K. Palanisamy was an Indian politician and former Member of the Legislative Assembly of Tamil Nadu. He was elected to the Tamil Nadu legislative assembly as a Communist Party of India candidate from Perundurai constituency in 1957, and 1971 elections.
