= V. Sampath Kumar =

Indian politician

Minister for Backward Classes, Most Backward Classes and Denotified Communities Welfare, Government of Tamil Nadu
- Incumbent
- Assumed office 4 May 2026
- Governor: Rajendra Arlekar
- Chief minister: C. Joseph Vijay
- Preceded by: Meyyanathan Siva V

Member of the Tamil Nadu Legislative Assembly
- Incumbent
- Assumed office 4 May 2026
- Preceded by: Amman K. Arjunan
- Constituency: Coimbatore North

Personal details
- Party: Tamilaga Vettri Kazhagam

V. Sampath Kumar is an Indian politician serving as the Minister for Backward Classes, Most Backward Classes and Denotified Communities Welfare in the Government of Tamil Nadu. He is a member of the Tamilaga Vettri Kazhagam (TVK) and represents the Coimbatore North Assembly constituency in the Tamil Nadu Legislative Assembly.

== Early life ==
V. Sampath Kumar hails from Coimbatore, Tamil Nadu. He was associated with the Vijay Makkal Iyakkam for many years before entering electoral politics through Tamilaga Vettri Kazhagam.

== Political career ==
Sampath Kumar was an active functionary of the Vijay Makkal Iyakkam and later became the Coimbatore City District Secretary of Tamilaga Vettri Kazhagam following the party's formation in 2024.

In the 2026 Tamil Nadu Legislative Assembly election, he contested from the Coimbatore North constituency as a TVK candidate and won the seat with a margin of 21,992 votes.

== Ministerial office ==
On 21 May 2026, Chief Minister C. Joseph Vijay inducted Sampath Kumar into the Tamil Nadu Council of Ministers. He was assigned the portfolio of Backward Classes, Most Backward Classes and Denotified Communities Welfare.
