= Somayampalayam =

- Suburb
- Location in Tamil Nadu, India Somayampalayam (India)
- Coordinates: 11°02′48.84″N 76°54′6.84″E
- Country: India
- State: Tamil Nadu
- Region: Kongu Nadu
- District: Coimbatore

Area
  - Total: 13.11 km^{2} (5.06 sq mi)

Population (2011)
  - Total: 14,787
  - Density: 1,128/km^{2} (2,921/sq mi)

Languages
  - Official: Tamil,
- Time zone: UTC+5:30 (IST)

Somayampalayam is a census town and a suburb in Coimbatore district in the Indian state of Tamil Nadu.

== See also ==
- Coimbatore metropolitan area
