= Kavundampalayam Assembly constituency =

One of the 234 State Legislative Assembly Constituencies in Tamil Nadu in India

Kavundampalayam
- Constituency No. 117 for the Tamil Nadu Legislative Assembly

Constituency details
- Country: India
- Region: South India
- State: Tamil Nadu
- District: Coimbatore
- Lok Sabha constituency: Coimbatore
- Established: 2008
- Total electors: 4,22,240
- Reservation: None

Member of Legislative Assembly
- 17th Tamil Nadu Legislative Assembly
- Incumbent Kanimozhi Santhosh
- Party: TVK
- Alliance: TVK+
- Elected year: 2026

Kavundampalayam is a legislative assembly constituency in the Indian state of Tamil Nadu. Its State Assembly Constituency number is 117. It historically ranks as one of the largest electorates by population size in the state.

== Composition ==
It comprises the municipality of Kavundampalayam and its surrounding areas in Coimbatore.

== History ==
It was formed by the 2008 delimitation and is part of the Coimbatore parliamentary constituency. It was created by the bifurcation of Thondamuthur Assembly constituency. It is one of the 234 State Legislative Assembly Constituencies in Tamil Nadu in India.

== Demographics ==
Electorate demographics of the Kavundampalayam constituency recorded ahead of recent state assembly general elections.

Year	Female	Male	Transgender	Total
2021	2,29,997	2,30,908	95	4,61,000
2026	—	—	—	422,138

== Members of the Legislative Assembly ==
Election	Name	Party
2011	V. C. Arukutty	All India Anna Dravida Munnetra Kazhagam
2016	V. C. Arukutty	All India Anna Dravida Munnetra Kazhagam
2021	P. R. G. Arunkumar	All India Anna Dravida Munnetra Kazhagam
2026	Kanimozhi Santhosh	Tamilaga Vettri Kazhagam

== Election results ==
Vote share of winning candidates
2026	40.24%
2021	44.19%
2016	40.70%
2011	63.22%

=== 2026 ===
2026 Tamil Nadu Legislative Assembly election: Kavundampalayam
Party	Candidate	Votes	%	±%
TVK	Kanimozhi Santhosh	146,466	40.24	New
AIADMK	P. R. G. Arunkumar	1,04,326	28.66	▼15.53
INC	K. P. Surya Prakash	90,726	24.93	New
NTK	Kalamani Jaganathan	16,834	4.62	▼1.21
NOTA	None of the above	2,116	0.58	▼0.36
Margin of victory		42,140	11.58	▲8.40
Turnout		3,63,991	86.20	▲20.21
Registered electors		4,22,240		▼42,988
TVK gain from AIADMK		Swing	▲40.24	

=== 2021 ===
2021 Tamil Nadu Legislative Assembly election: Kavundampalayam
Party	Candidate	Votes	%	±%
AIADMK	P. R. G. Arunkumar	135,669	44.19	▲3.49
DMK	R. Krishnan	1,25,893	41.00	▲3.25
MNM	Pankaj Jain	23,527	7.66	
NTK	Kalamani. M	17,897	5.83	▲4.46
NOTA	Nota	2,892	0.94	▼0.99
AMMK	Aruna. M	2,002	0.65	
Margin of victory		9,776	3.18	▲0.24
Turnout		3,07,026	65.99	▼0.43
Rejected ballots		971	0.32	
Registered electors		4,65,228		
AIADMK hold		Swing	▲3.49	

=== 2016 ===
2016 Tamil Nadu Legislative Assembly election: Kavundampalayam
Party	Candidate	Votes	%	±%
AIADMK	V. C. Arukutty	110,870	40.70	▼22.52
DMK	Payya Gounder @ Krishnan. R.	1,02,845	37.76	▲6.48
BJP	Nandakumar. R.	22,444	8.24	▲5.39
CPI(M)	Ramamurthy. V.	16,874	6.19	
NOTA	None of the above	5,274	1.94	
Margin of victory		8,025	2.95	▼29.00
Turnout		2,72,400	66.42	▼7.15
Registered electors		4,10,090		
AIADMK hold		Swing	▼22.52	

=== 2011 ===
2011 Tamil Nadu Legislative Assembly election: Kavundampalayam
Party	Candidate	Votes	%	±%
AIADMK	V. C. Arukutty	137,058	63.22	
DMK	Subramanian T P	67,798	31.27	
BJP	Nandakumar R	6,175	2.85	
Margin of victory		69,260	31.95	
Turnout		2,94,632	73.58	
Registered electors		2,16,785		
AIADMK win (new seat)				
