= Goundampalayam =

Goundampalayam Kaundampalayam
- suburb
- Location in Tamil Nadu, India
- Coordinates: 11.043620°N 76.924667°E
- Country: India
- State: Tamil Nadu
- District: Coimbatore

Area
  - Total: 10.5 km^{2} (4.1 sq mi)

Population (2011)
  - Total: 83,908
  - Density: 7,990/km^{2} (20,700/sq mi)

Languages
  - Official: Tamil
- Time zone: UTC+5:30 (IST)

Goundampalayam is a suburb and former municipality in Coimbatore district in the Indian state of Tamil Nadu. It is part of the Coimbatore Corporation, located in the north-western part of the state. Spread across an area of 10.5 km^{2} (4.1 sq mi), it had a population of 83,908 individuals as per the 2011 census.

== Geography and administration ==
Goundampalayam is a locality in the Coimbatore North taluk of Coimbatore district in the Indian state of Tamil Nadu. A former municipality, it forms part of the Coimbatore Corporation. Spread across an area of 10.5 km^{2} (4.1 sq mi), it is one of the 33 panchayat towns in the district. It is located in the western part of the state. The region has a tropical climate with hot summers and mild winters. The highest temperatures are recorded between March and May, with lowest recordings between December and February.

The town panchayat is headed by a chairperson, who is elected by the members, who are chosen through direct elections. The town forms part of the Kavundampalayam Assembly constituency that elects its member to the Tamil Nadu legislative assembly and the Coimbatore Lok Sabha constituency that elects its member to the Parliament of India.

== Demographics ==
As per the 2011 census, Goundampalayam had a population of 83,908 individuals across 22,155 households. The population saw a significant increase compared to the previous census in 2001 when 48,276 inhabitants were registered. The population consisted of 42,351 males and 41,557 females. About 8,689 individuals were below the age of six years. The entire population is classified as urban. The town has an average literacy rate of 89.9%. About 9.1% of the population belonged to scheduled castes.

About 43.4% of the eligible population were employed full-time. Hinduism was the majority religion which was followed by 87.2% of the population, with Christianity (8.1%) and Islam (4.2%) being minor religions.
