= K. N. Palanisamy Gounder =

Indian politician

K. N. Palanisamy Gounder was an Indian politician and former member of the Legislative Assembly of Tamil Nadu. He was elected to the Tamil Nadu legislative assembly as an Indian National Congress candidate from Tiruppur constituency in 1957, and 1962 elections.

He contributed to improve the Tirupur city, with basic infrastructure and brought water to the water scant city. For his contribution, he regarded as Father of Tirupur.
