= Tamizhaga Murpokku Makkal Katchi =

- President: K.Sakthivel
- Founded: 2006
- Headquarters: Chennai, Tamil Nadu
- Ideology: Social democracy/populism

Website
- www.tmmkatchi.org

Tamizhaga Murpokku Makkal Katchi, formerly known as Makkal Manadu Katchi, is a regional political party in India, actively involved in the political affairs of Tamilnadu State. The Party came into being in 2005 with the objective of being a people centered, poor friendly political alternative and to spearhead the ideology of self-reliant economy to alleviate poverty, unemployment, backwardness and to eradicate economic disadvantages and social inequalities in the country. The party vehemently opposes dependent economy, neglect of indigenous resources and voice against the anomaly of leaving the production of key commodities at the hands of a few influential people. The party is a strong proponent of probity in public life and weed out the corruption thereby.

== History ==
This party came into existence immediately after Mr Sakthivel had written a Book on Globalisation – A Slave Economy in September, 2005. Friends and well-wishers mostly consisting of Advocates who read the Book of Mr Sakthivel suggested that an awareness on creation of self-reliant India and opposing unlimited globalisation. Therefore, for the purpose of creating awareness a forum under the name MAKKAL MAANAADU meaning people's conference was formed in September, 2005 and a number of meetings held in various parts of Tamil Nadu. It was realized that no effective awareness could be created among the people by a mere forum and it was only through a political platform an awareness could be created. Therefore, the forum under the name of MAKKAL MAANAADU was converted into a political party on 3 January 2006 at the meeting hall, Anand Theatre Complex, Anna Salai, Chennai. Thereafter, the party formally gave an application for registration of the same as a political party with the Election Commission of India and registered as a political party in the month of October 2006. The party will now march forward to see a new nation free from clutches of poverty, unemployment and also freedom from want.

=== First Election Contest – May 2006 ===
Elections to the Tamil Nadu State Assembly were announced in the month of May 2006 and the party decided to field candidates in four Assembly constituencies as an experiment. Accordingly, the party fielded candidates in Villivakkam, Aranthangi, Peravurani and Aarani. Mr Satishkumar, Advocate contested from Villivakkam, Mr Ramanathan contested from Aranthangi constituency. Mr Thirugnanam, Advocate contested from Aarani and Mr Raja who contested from Peravurani. Considering the expenditure of other political parties, the votes secured by the MMK party candidates only shows that the people are open for alternate principled parties.

=== Second Election Contest – Oct 2007 ===
The party contested in the Madurai west assembly bye elections. Mr. Suvichelvan a Post Graduate was the nominee of MMK for this election.

=== Third Election Contest – May 2009 ===
The party contested seven parliamentary constituencies in the state of Tamil Nadu in the General Election to Lok Sabha, 2009. The constituencies are Sivaganga, Thiruchirappali-, Perambalur, Vellore, Dharmapuri, North Chennaiand Central Chennai. The party contested the above said parliamentary election on retrieving the economic sovereignty of Tamil people, supporting Eelam cause of Sri Lankan Tamils, new constitution incorporating the aspirations of people on basis of language, reservation in parliamentary and assembly constituencies and central government posts, on basis of language. The party felt that all major political parties in Tamil Nadu acted against the interest of Tamil people, more particularly the cause of Sri Lankan Tamils. The DMK and PMK were part of UPA government which supported the Sri Lanka Government and the AIADMK had either kept mum or expressed opinions against the Sri Lankan Tamils interest. Further, Congress, BJP, Communists parties paid only lip service to the cause of Tamil peoples. Therefore, the party contested alone in the General Election to Lok Sabha in 2009.

=== Fourth Election Contest – May 2011 ===
The party contested 12 Assembly constituencies in the state of Tamil Nadu in the General Election - 2011. The constituencies and candidates are Alandur- Thiru. Mansoor Ali Khan, Saidapet- Advocate Thiru. Chandra sekar, Villivakkam-Advocate Thiru.K.P.Satish Kumar, Anna Nagar- Advocate Thiru. Sampath Kumar, R.K.Nagar- Thiru.Madhu, Velacherry- Thiru.Anbazhalagan, Sozhinganallur-Thiru. Damotharan, Mylapore-Auditor Thiru. Gopinarayan, Anaikat- Thiru. Dharman and Senji-Advocate Thiru.Bhaskaraiah.

=== Pudukkottai Bye Election Contest ===
The party contested the Pudukkottai bye election in the year 2012 and the Makkal Manadu Katchi fielded Arivalagan as its nominee for the by-election to Pudukottai Assembly constituency.

=== Parliamentary Election Contest – 2014 ===
The party is contesting consecutive General Elections in Tamil Nadu both for Assembly and Parliament. Presently, the party is contesting Parliament Elections in seven constituencies in the state of Tamil Nadu namely, Chennai North, Central Chennai, Sivaganga, Salem, Coimbatore, Tirupur and Nilgiris . The party has stated in its manifesto among others to eradicate poverty, unemployment and corruption in Indian politics and to ensure sustained economic growth based on India's resources and requirements along with clean, transparent and efficient government by empowering the educated youth and women of India. Further, the party has stated in its manifesto to declare that there is no race called as Dravidian and Tamils are to be recognised as a race.

=== Assembly Election – 2016 ===
The party initially formed an alliance under the name of Vidial Kootany along with LJP and Actor Karthik's Natalum Makkal Katchi and thereafter, the party left the alliance and contested on its own in 9 constituencies

=== Conference ===
The first conference of the Party held at Cuddalore on 2 September 2008 and theme of the conference was "Economic Sovereignty of Tamil People". The conference passed number of resolutions to protect the interest and welfare of the Tamil People. The basis of conference is that unless any race is powerful enough to compete with other races on the question of economics, the said race can not sustain in the world as a race against the onslaught of other races and the conference is of the opinion that the Tamil race has lost its economic competitiveness to sustain as a race and therefore, all efforts should be made to regain the economic superiority of the Tamil People. The conference is also of the view that Tamil Nadu being the motherland of all Tamilians living all over the world, Tamil Nadu should be maintained as a place where Tamilpeople can have all the say in all the matters. The first resolution demanded that no outsider should be offered with a job either in the Government or in the private, in the state of Tamil Nadu, the second resolution wanted the Government of India to help achieve the creation of Eelam, the third resolution wanted the Katchathevu agreement with Sri Lanka should be scrapped. The most important resolution of the conference is relating to the illusionary concept of Dravidam and the resolution describes how the Tamil speaking people are becoming powerless in all fields by all people who speak Telugu, Malayalam and Kannada languages in the guise of Dravidam. Thousands of people attended the conference.

=== Tamilar Unity Conference At Chennai – 2013 ===
The Party organised Tamilar Unity Conference at Chennai On 5-1-2013 in the midst of communal clashes and the said conference was attended by the party President K. Sakthivel, Cinema Director V.Sekar, Tamilar Varalatru Aaivu Naduvam President Selva, Pavalar Ramachandran, Neyveli Balu, Chandresan, Mmk Secretary K. P. Satishkumar And Others

=== Activities ===
The Party organised three important protest programmes opposing the inclusion of Pollachi Railway areas with the Palacode Railway Division, Creation of Special Economic Zone in the fertile areas of Eliarpatty and other villagers near Madurai and opposing the construction of elementary school buildings in the middle of water-logged low-lying area in the village of Kunnur in the Pudukkottai District.

=== Anti-corruption Activities ===
The Party organised a demonstration on 10-1-2014 at Chepauk Guest House, Chennai demanding enactment of Lok Ayukta Act and Right to services Act and also in other places in Tamil Nadu. On 18-1-2014, the party released draft Lok Ayukta Act in Chennai. MMK organised many signature campaign all over Tamil Nadu for about 4 months commencing from February, 2014. Thereafter, the party organised a march from Kannyakumari to Madurai from 18-4-2015 to 29-4-2015 demanding enactment of Lok Ayukta Act and Right to services Act. Subsequently, the party organised a three-day hunger fast at Valluvar Kottam, Chennai from 19-1-2016 to 21-1-2016 and conducted a demonstration on 3-2-2016 in front of Chennai Collector Office demanding enactment of Lok Ayukta Act and Right to services Act. A modified draft Lok Ayukta Act was released on 15-2-2016 at Saidapet, Chennai. Further, MMK organised many Anti-corruption pledge taking programs to create an awareness among the people of Tamil Nadu. On 6-3-2016, MMK organised massive public meeting at Mankollai in Mylapore, chennai to bring Lok Ayukta in Tamil Nadu wherein Supreme Court Senior Counsel and anti-corruption activist Mr.Prasanth Bhusan addressed.

=== Tamizhaga Murpokku Makkal Katchi ===
The party General Council meeting held on 21-04-2017, resolved to change the party’s name to Tamizhaga Murpokku Makkal Katchi (Tamil தமிழக முற்போக்கு மக்கள் கட்சி) and the Election Commission of India by way of notification dated 18-10-2017 has approved the amended name. Thus, MMK has been renamed as Tamizhaga Murpokku Makkal Katchi.
