= C. Govindasamy =

Indian politician

C. Govindasamy is an Indian politician and incumbent Member of the Legislative Assembly of Tamil Nadu. He was elected to the Tamil Nadu legislative assembly as a Communist Party of India (Marxist) candidate from Tiruppur constituency in 1989, and 2006 elections.

Govindasamy was removed from the CPI(M) in 2010 for organising a meeting to appreciate the good works of the State Government headed by Karunanidhi of the Dravida Munnetra Kazhagam party.

During the elections in April 2011, he contested the elections from Tirupur South and lost to M. S. M. Anandan of the All India Anna Dravida Munnetra Kazhagam.

During election Tirupur corporation 2022. He was elected as a Ward member (46) Also 3rd Zone head of Tirupur corporation.
