= Makkal Needhi Maiam =

Indian political party

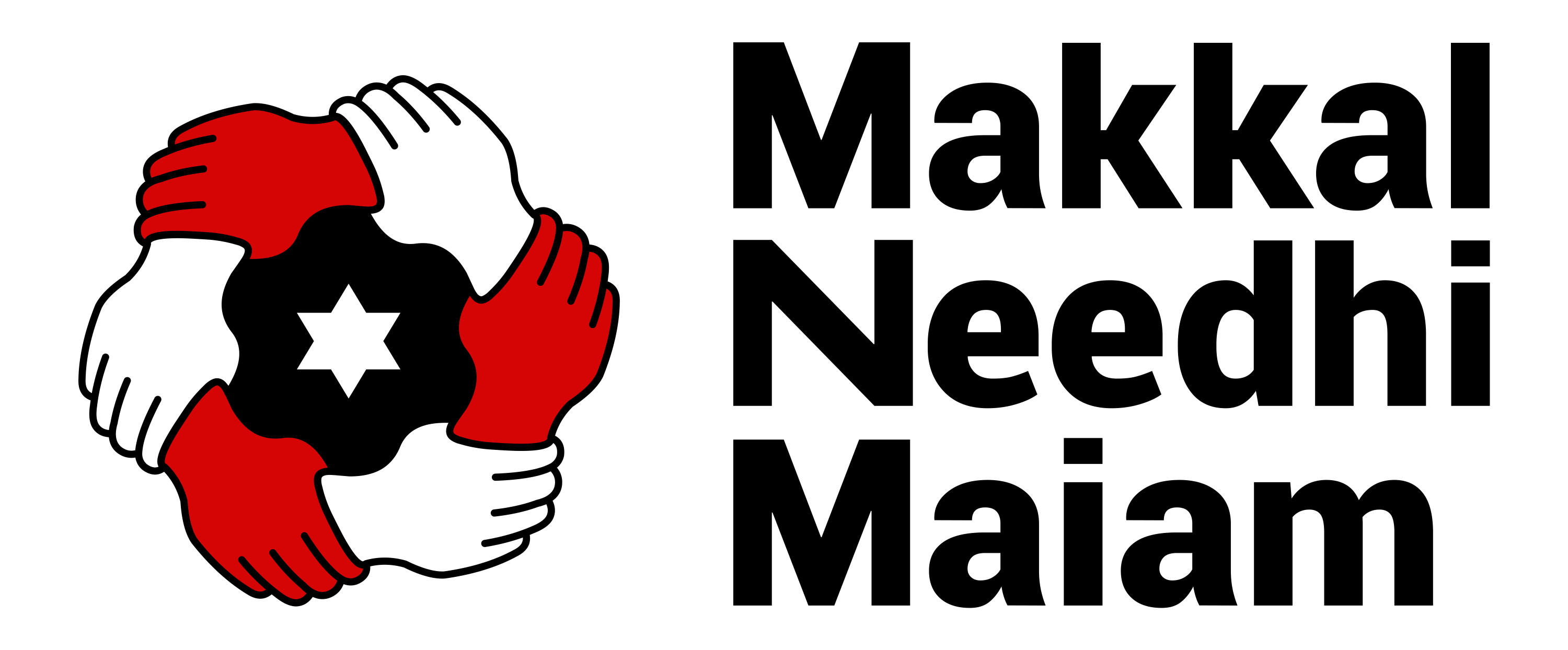
- Abbreviation: MNM
- President: Kamal Haasan
- General Secretary: A. Arunachalam
- Parliamentary Chairperson: Kamal Haasan
- Rajya Sabha Leader: Kamal Haasan
- Founder: Kamal Haasan
- Founded: 21 February 2018 (8 years ago)
- Headquarters: 4, Eldams Road, Vannia Teynampet, Alwarpet, Chennai-600018, Tamil Nadu, India
- Ideology: Centrism; Anti-corruption
- Political position: Centre
- Colours: Red
- Alliance: INDIA (2024–2026); SPA (2024–present)
- Seats in Rajya Sabha: 1 / 245
- Seats in Lok Sabha: 0 / 543
- Seats in Tamil Nadu Legislative Assembly: 0 / 234
- Seats in Puducherry Legislative Assembly: 0 / 30
- Number of states and union territories in government: 0 / 31

Election symbol
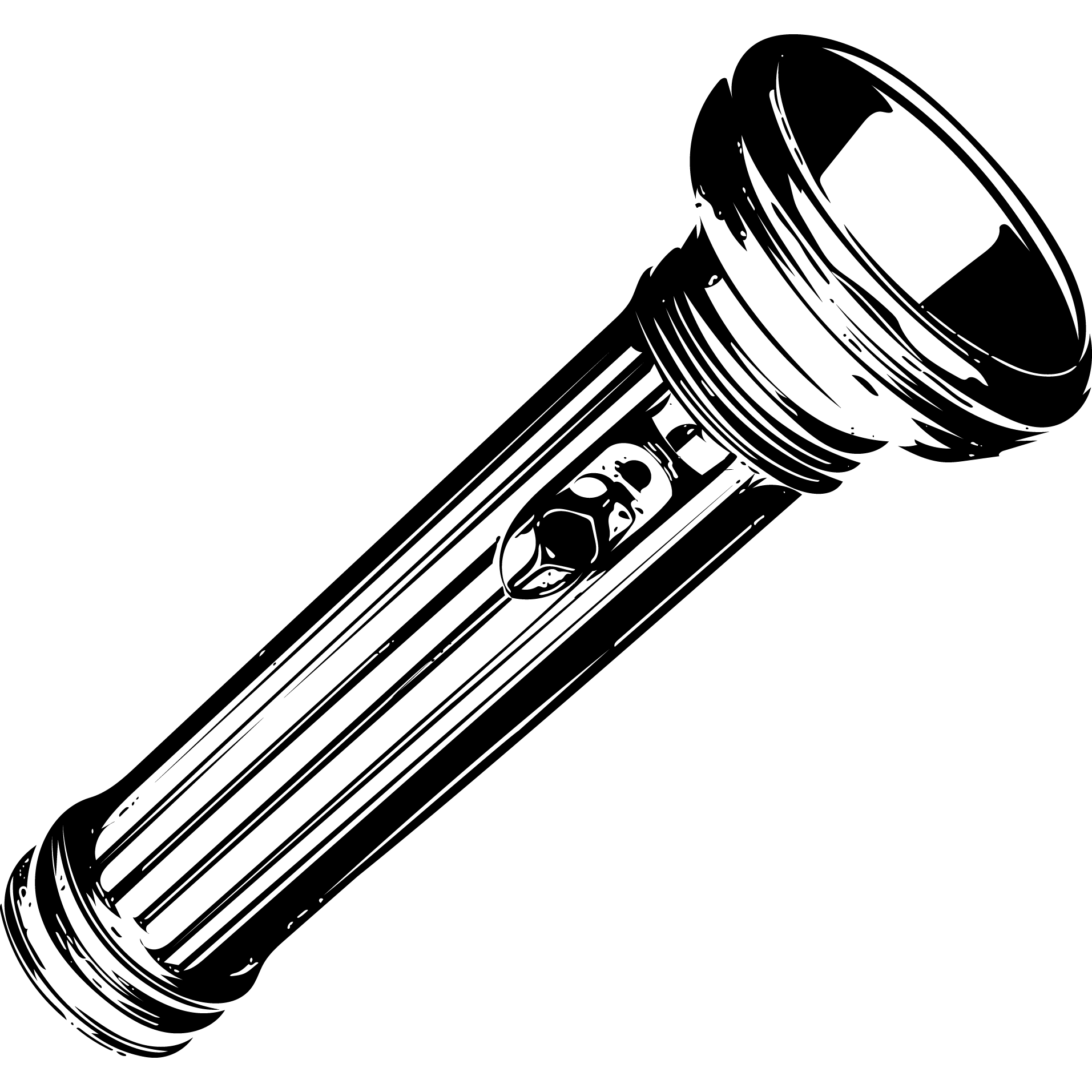

Website
- MAIAM

The Makkal Needhi Maiam (transl. Centre for People's Justice; abbr. MNM) is an Indian regional political party in the state of Tamil Nadu and the union territory of Puducherry. The party was founded by Kamal Haasan at Madurai on 21 February 2018. He also unveiled the party flag. The flag is symbolised by six interlocked hands, meant to represent co-operation between the Southern states of India (five states and one UT). Their election symbol is a battery torchlight.

MNM has also launched a mobile whistleblower application named 'Maiam Whistle', open to the public.

This party is estimated to have around 5,500 office bearers at present. In 2024, the party officially joined DMK-led Secular Progressive Alliance.

== President ==
Kamal Haasan, the President of the Makkal Needhi Maiam party, appointed Mr. A.G. Mourya IPS (Retd) and Mr. Thangavelu as vice-president of Makkal Needhi Maiam party in 2021.

== State Secretaries list ==
Kamal Haasan announced new executives of Makkal Needhi Maiam party on 26 June 2021.

Role	Name
State Secretary, HQ	Mr. Senthil Arumugam
State Secretary, Press & Media	Mr. Murali Appas
State Secretary, Narpani	Mr. Moorthi
State Organizer, Narpani	Mr. Nagarajan
State Secretary, Students Wing	Mr. Rakesh Rajasekaran
State Secretary, Organization	NIL
State Secretary, Women Wing	Mrs. Mookambika rathinam
State Secretary, Engineering Wing	Mr. Vaitheeswaran
State Secretary, Agriculture Wing	Mr. Mayilsamy
State Secretary, Fisherman Wing	Mr. Preadeep Kumar
State Secretary, Youth Wing	Mr. Kavingar Snekan

== Electoral performance ==
=== Indian general elections ===
Lok Sabha Elections
Year	Lok Sabha	Party leader	Seats contested	Seats won	Change in seats	Percentage of votes	Vote swing	Popular vote	Outcome
2019	17th	Kamal Haasan	37	0 / 543	Steady	0.40%	Steady	1,613,708	Lost
2024	18th	Kamal Haasan	Chose not to contest the 2024 polls, quoted "Welfare of the nation is more important than our personal welfare" and decided to provide support to the DMK-led Alliance						

Rajya Sabha Elections
Year	Party Leader	Candidate(s)	Contested Constituency	Seats contested	Seats won	Change in seats	Outcome
2024	Kamal Haasan	Kamal Haasan	Tamil Nadu	1	1 / 1	Steady	Opposition

=== State legislative assembly elections ===
Tamil Nadu Legislative Assembly Elections
Year	Assembly	Party leader	Seats contested	Seats won	Change in seats	Percentage of votes	Vote swing	Popular vote	Outcome
2021	16th	Kamal Haasan	180	0 / 234	Steady	2.62%	Steady	1,210,667	Lost
2026	17th	Kamal Haasan	Chose not to contest the 2026 polls, quoted "not okay with the number of seats offered and the condition that its candidates contest on the DMK's symbol" and decided to provide unconditional support to the DMK-led Alliance						

Puducherry Legislative Assembly Elections
Year	Assembly	Party leader	Seats contested	Seats won	Change in seats	Percentage of votes	Vote swing	Popular vote	Outcome
2021	15th	Kamal Haasan	22	0 / 30	Steady	1.89%	Steady	15,835	Lost

== 2019 Lok Sabha Election ==
For the 2019 Indian general election he declared to contest on 40 seats included 39 of Tamil Nadu and 1 of Puducherry. Initially, there was speculation that Kamal Haasan could ally with the Congress after the state Congress chief had hinted at it. A few days ago, a lesser known Republican Party of India had forged an alliance with the MNM.

Releasing the party manifesto and the second list of candidates of his Makkal Needhi Maiam or MNM at a function in Coimbatore, Mr Haasan said, "All candidates are my faces. I am proud being the chariot puller than being in the chariot".

Makkal Needhi Maiam's vote share in the 2019 Lok Sabha election was 3.72% (in the seats it contested). Makkal Needhi Maiam secured 1,613,708 votes of the 4,20,83,544 polled in Tamil Nadu. J. Ebenezer, who contested from the Kanniyakumari constituency secured the fewest votes at 8,590 while the MNM vice-president Dr. R.Mahendran contesting from the Coimbatore constituency secured the highest number of votes by the party at 1,45,104. The party performed well in urban areas such as Chennai, Coimbatore and Madurai, where it regularly polled upwards of 8.5% to 12.5% of the vote share and often secured more than one lakh votes, but it performed poorly in rural areas. Despite this, all the candidates lost their deposit.

Makkal Needhi Maiam candidates lost their deposit in all the seats it contested in the 2019 Indian general election but they came third in many urban constituencies through it fell behind the Naam Tamilar Katchi in several rural constituencies and Amma Makkal Munnettra Kazagam in some constituencies behind the DMK and AIADMK fronts came first or second in all constituencies.

== 2021 Tamil Nadu Assembly Election ==
On 13 December 2020, Haasan launched MNM's election campaign for the 2021 Tamil Nadu Legislative Assembly election, running candidates in 142 assembly constituencies and committing that he would not form an alliance with either DMK or AIADMK. MNM failed to win any seat in the election, with Haasan himself losing to BJP's Vanathi Srinivasan in the Coimbatore South Assembly constituency by 1728 votes.

Later on MNM chief Kamal Haasan allies with Congress to support by-election candidate EVKS Elangovan.

== 2024 Lok Sabha Election ==
The party extended its support for the INDIA and Kamal Haasan formally joined it by campaigning for the DMK alliance in Tamil Nadu. DMK has agreed to grant one Rajya Sabha seat for the 2025 elections.

== List of party leaders ==
=== Presidents ===
No.	Portrait	Name (Birth–Death)	Term in office		
No.	Portrait	Name (Birth–Death)	Assumed office	Left office	Time in office
1		Kamal Haasan (b. 1954)	21 February 2018	Incumbent	8 years, 245 days

=== General Secretaries ===
No.	Portrait	Name (LIFE)	Term in office		
No.	Portrait	Name (LIFE)	Assumed office	Left office	Time in office
1		Arunachalam (unknown–)	21 February 2018	25 December 2020	2 years, 308 days
(1)		Arunachalam (unknown–)	26 February 2023	Incumbent	3 years, 240 days

== See also ==
- List of political parties in India
