= 14th Tamil Nadu Assembly =

2011–2016 Tamil Nadu Assembly term

←	13th	15th	→

Overview
- Legislative body: Tamil Nadu Legislative Assembly
- Meeting place: Fort St. George, Chennai
- Term: 16 May 2011 – 22 May 2016
- Election: 2011 Tamil Nadu Legislative Assembly election
- Government: Fourth Jayalalithaa ministry (2011-2014); Second Panneerselvam ministry (2014-2015); Fifth Jayalalithaa ministry (2015-2016)
- Opposition: Desiya Murpokku Dravida Kazhagam
- Website: Official website
- Members: 235
- Speaker: P. Dhanapal
- Deputy Speaker: V. Jayaraman
- Chief Minister: J.Jayalalithaa
- Leader of the Opposition: Vijayakanth
- Party control: All India Anna Dravida Munnetra Kazhagam

The 14th Assembly of Tamil Nadu was constituted after the victory of All India Anna Dravida Munnetra Kazhagam (AIADMK) and allies, in the 2011 state assembly election. J. Jayalalithaa became the Chief Minister of Tamil Nadu due to the election. She was sworn in as the Chief Minister of Tamil Nadu for the fourth time.

== Overview ==
Source: Tamil Nadu Legislative Assembly website

Office	Officer
Speaker	D. Jayakumar (27 May 2011 – 9 October 2012)
Speaker	P. Dhanapal (10 October 2012 – 22 May 2016)
Deputy Speaker	P. Dhanapal (27 May 2011 – 9 October 2012)
Deputy Speaker	Jayaraman (10 October 2012 – 22 May 2016)
Leader of the House	O. Panneerselvam
Leader of Opposition	Vijayakanth till January 2016
Chief Government Whip	R. Manoharan

== Chief ministers ==
Chief Minister	Took office	Left office	Term	Notes
J. Jayalalithaa	16 May 2011	27 September 2014	1,230 days	Disqualified from her position as a MLA and was forced to step down from the office of Chief Minister, convicted in a corruption case
O. Panneerselvam	28 September 2014	22 May 2015	236 days	Interim Period
J. Jayalalithaa	23 May 2015	22 May 2016	365 days	The Karnataka High Court acquits J. Jayalalithaa and all others in the disproportionate assets case, clearing the legal path for her return to office.

== Members ==
Panneerselvam became the finance minister in Jayalalithaa's 4th Cabinet.

Composition of parties
No.	Constituency	Member	Party
1	Gummidipundi	C. H. Shekar	DMDK
2	Ponneri (SC)	Pon. Raja	AIADMK
3	Tiruttani	M. Arun Subramanian	DMDK
4	Thiruvallur	B. V. Ramanaa	AIADMK
5	Poonamallee (SC)	R. Manimaran	AIADMK
6	Avadi	S. Abdul Rahim	AIADMK
7	Maduravoyal	G. Beem Rao	CPI(M)
8	Ambattur	S. Vedachalam	AIADMK
9	Madavaram	V. Moorthy	AIADMK
10	Thiruvottiyur	K. Kuppan	AIADMK
11	Dr.Radhakrishnan Nagar	P. Vetriivel	AIADMK
12	Perambur	A. Soundararajan	CPI(M)
13	Kolathur	M. K. Stalin	DMK
14	Villivakkam	J. C. D. Prabhakar	AIADMK
15	Thiru. Vi. Ka. Nagar (SC)	V. Neelakandan	AIADMK
16	Egmore (SC)	K. Nalla Thambi	DMDK
17	Royapuram	D. Jayakumar	AIADMK
18	Harbour	Pala. Karuppiah	AIADMK
19	Chepauk-Thiruvallikeni	J. Anbazhagan	DMK
20	Thousand Lights	B. Valarmathi	AIADMK
21	Anna Nagar	S. Gokula Indira	AIADMK
22	Virugambakkam	B. Parthasarathy	DMDK
23	Saidapet	G. Senthamizhan	AIADMK
24	T. Nagar	V. P. Kalairajan	AIADMK
25	Mylapore	R. Rajalakshmi	AIADMK
26	Velachery	M. K. Ashok	AIADMK
27	Sholinganallur	K. P. Kandan	AIADMK
28	Alandur	V.N.P. Venkatraman	AIADMK
29	Sriperumbudur (SC)	R. Perumal	AIADMK
30	Pallavaram	P. Dhansingh	AIADMK
31	Tambaram	T. K. M. Chinnayya	AIADMK
32	Chengalpattu	D. Murugesan	DMDK
33	Thiruporur	K. Manoharan	AIADMK
34	Cheyyur (SC)	V. S. Raji	AIADMK
35	Madurantakam (SC)	S. Kanitha Sampath	AIADMK
36	Uthiramerur	P. Ganesan	AIADMK
37	Kancheepuram	V. Somasundaram	AIADMK
38	Arakkonam (SC)	S. Ravi	AIADMK
39	Sholingur	P. R. Manogar	DMDK
40	Katpadi	Durai Murugan	DMK
41	Ranipet	A. Mohammedjan	AIADMK
42	Arcot	R. Srinivasan	AIADMK
43	Vellore	V. S. Vijay	AIADMK
44	Anaikattu	M. Kalai Arasu	PMK
45	K. V. Kuppam (SC)	C.K. Thamizharasan	RPI
46	Gudiyattam (SC)	K. Lingamuthu	CPI
47	Vaniyambadi	Govi. Sampath Kumar	AIADMK
48	Ambur	A. Aslam Basha	MMK
49	Jolarpet	K. C. Veeramani	AIADMK
50	Tirupattur	K. G. Ramesh	AIADMK
51	Uthangarai (SC)	Manoranjitham Nagaraj	AIADMK
52	Bargur	K. E. Krishnamoorthi	AIADMK
53	Krishnagiri	K. P. Munusamy	AIADMK
54	Veppanahalli	T. Senguttuvan	DMK
55	Hosur	K. Gopinath	INC
56	Thalli	T. Ramachandran	CPI
57	Palacodu	K. P. Anbalagan	AIADMK
58	Pennagaram	N. Nanjappan	CPI
59	Dharmapuri	A. Baskar	DMDK
60	Pappireddippatti	P. Palaniappan	AIADMK
61	Harur (SC)	P. Dillibabu	CPI(M)
62	Chengam (SC)	T. Sureshkumar	DMDK
63	Tiruvannamalai	E. V. Velu	DMK
64	Kilpennathur	A. K. Aranganathan	AIADMK
65	Kalasapakkam	S. S. Krishnamoorthy	AIADMK
66	Polur	L. Jaya Sudha	AIADMK
67	Arani	R. M. Babu Murugavel	DMDK
68	Cheyyar	Mukkur N. Subramanian	AIADMK
69	Vandavasi (SC)	V. Gunaseelan	AIADMK
70	Gingee	A. Ganesh Kumar	PMK
71	Mailam	K. P. Nagarajan	AIADMK
72	Tindivanam (SC)	D. Haridoss	AIADMK
73	Vanur (SC)	I. Janagiraman	AIADMK
74	Villupuram	C. V. Shanmugam	AIADMK
75	Vikravandi	R. Ramamurthy	CPI(M)
76	Tirukkoyilur	L. Venkatesan	DMDK
77	Ulundurpettai	R. Kumaraguru	AIADMK
78	Rishivandiyam	Vijayakanth	DMDK
79	Sankarapuram	P. Mohan	AIADMK
80	Kallakurichi (SC)	K. Alaguvelu	AIADMK
81	Gangavalli (SC)	R. Subha	DMDK
82	Attur (SC)	S. Madheswaran	AIADMK
83	Yercaud (ST)	C. Perumal	AIADMK
84	Omalur	C. Krishnan	AIADMK
85	Mettur	S. R. Parthiban	DMK
86	Edappadi	K. Palanisamy	AIADMK
87	Sankari	P. Vijayalakshmi Palanisamy	AIADMK
88	Salem (West)	G. Venkatachalam	AIADMK
89	Salem (North)	Alagapuram R. Mohanraj	DMDK
90	Salem (South)	M. K. Selvaraju	AIADMK
91	Veerapandi	S. K. Selvam	AIADMK
92	Rasipuram (SC)	P. Dhanapal	AIADMK
93	Senthamangalam (ST)	R. Santhi	DMDK
94	Namakkal	K. P. P. Baskar	AIADMK
95	Paramathi Velur	U. Thaniyarasu	TNKIP
96	Tiruchengodu	P. Sampath Kumar	DMDK
97	Kumarapalayam	P. Thangamani	AIADMK
98	Erode (East)	V. C. Chandhirakumar	DMDK
99	Erode (West)	K. V. Ramalingam	AIADMK
100	Modakkurichi	R. N. Kittusamy	AIADMK
101	Perundurai	N. D. Venkatachalam	AIADMK
102	Bhavani	P. G. Narayanan	AIADMK
103	Anthiyur	S. S. Ramanitharan	AIADMK
104	Gobichettipalayam	K. A. Sengottaiyan	AIADMK
105	Bhavanisagar (SC)	P. L. Sundaram	CPI
106	Dharapuram (SC)	K. Ponnusamy	AIADMK
107	Kangayam	N. S. N. Nataraj	AIADMK
108	Avanashi (SC)	A. A. Karuppasamy	AIADMK
109	Tiruppur (North)	M. S. M. Anandan	AIADMK
110	Tiruppur (South)	K. Thangavel	CPI(M)
111	Palladam	K. P. Paramasivam	AIADMK
112	Udumalpet	Pollachi V. Jayaraman	AIADMK
113	Madathukulam	C. Shanmugavelu	AIADMK
114	Udhagamandalam	Budhichandhiran	AIADMK
115	Gudalur (SC)	M. Thiravidamani	DMK
116	Coonoor	K. Ramachandran	DMK
117	Mettuppalayam	O. K. Chinnaraj	AIADMK
118	Sulur	K. Thinakaran	DMDK
119	Kavundampalayam	V. C. Arukutty	AIADMK
120	Coimbatore (North)	T. Malaravan	AIADMK
121	Thondamuthur	S. P. Velumani	AIADMK
122	Coimbatore (South)	R. Duraisamy	AIADMK
123	Singanallur	R. Chinnasamy	AIADMK
124	Kinathukadavu	S. Damodaran	AIADMK
125	Pollachi	M. K. Muthukaruppannasamy	AIADMK
126	Valparai (SC)	M. Arumugham	CPI
127	Palani	K. S. N. Venugopalu	AIADMK
128	Oddanchatram	R. Sakkarapani	DMK
129	Athoor	I. Periyasamy	DMK
130	Nilakkottai (SC)	A. Ramasamy	PT
131	Natham	R. Viswanathan	AIADMK
132	Dindigul	K. Balabharathi	CPI(M)
133	Vedasandur	S. Palanichamy	AIADMK
134	Aravakurichi	K. C. Palanisamy	DMK
135	Karur	V. Senthil Balaji	AIADMK
136	Krishnarayapuram (SC)	S. Kamaraj	AIADMK
137	Kulithalai	A. Pappasundaram	AIADMK
138	Manapaarai	R. Chandrasekar	AIADMK
139	Srirangam	J. Jayalalithaa	AIADMK
140	Tiruchirappalli (West)	M. Paranjothi	AIADMK
141	Tiruchirappalli (East)	R. Manoharan	AIADMK
142	Thiruverumbur	S. Senthilkumar	DMDK
143	Lalgudi	A. Soundara Pandian	DMK
144	Manachanallur	T. P. Poonatchi	AIADMK
145	Musiri	N. R. Sivapathi	AIADMK
146	Thuraiyur (SC)	T. Indragandhi	AIADMK
147	Perambalur (SC)	R. Thamizhselvan	AIADMK
148	Kunnam	S. S. Sivasankar	DMK
149	Ariyalur	Durai. Manivel	AIADMK
150	Jayankondam	J. Guru (alias) Gurunathan	PMK
151	Tittakudi (SC)	K. Tamil Azhagan	DMDK
152	Vriddhachalam	V. Muthukumar	DMDK
153	Neyveli	M. P. S. Sivasubramaniyan	AIADMK
154	Panruti	P. Sivakozhundu	DMDK
155	Cuddalore	M. C. Sampath	AIADMK
156	Kurinjipadi	R. Rajendran	AIADMK
157	Bhuvanagiri	Selvi Ramajayam	AIADMK
158	Chidambaram	K. Balakrishnan	CPI(M)
159	Kattumannarkoil (SC)	N. Murugumaran	AIADMK
160	Sirkazhi (SC)	M. Sakthi	AIADMK
161	Mayiladuthurai	R. Arulselvan	DMDK
162	Poompuhar	S. Pavunraj	AIADMK
163	Nagapattinam	K. A. Jayapal	AIADMK
164	Kilvelur (SC)	P. Mahalingam	CPI(M)
165	Vedaranyam	N. V. Kamaraj	AIADMK
166	Thiruthuraipoondi (SC)	K. Ulaganathan	CPI
167	Mannargudi	T. R. B. Rajaa	DMK
168	Thiruvarur	Karunanidhi	DMK
169	Nannilam	R. Kamaraj	AIADMK
170	Thiruvidaimarudur (SC)	Govi. Chezhian	DMK
171	Kumbakonam	G. Anbalagan	DMK
172	Papanasam	R. Doraikkannu	AIADMK
173	Thiruvaiyaru	M. Rethinasamy	AIADMK
174	Thanjavur	M. Rangaswamy	AIADMK
175	Orathanadu	R. Vaithilingam	AIADMK
176	Pattukkottai	N. R. Rengarajan	INC
177	Peravurani	C. Arunpandian	DMDK
178	Gandharvakottai (SC)	N. Subramanian	AIADMK
179	Viralimalai	C. Vijayabasker	AIADMK
180	Pudukkottai	V. R. Karthik Thondaiman	AIADMK
181	Thirumayam	P. K. Vairamuthu	AIADMK
182	Alangudi	Ku. Pa. Krishnan	AIADMK
183	Aranthangi	M. Rajanayagam	AIADMK
184	Karaikudi	Cholan C. T. Palanichamy	AIADMK
185	Tiruppattur	K. R. Periyakaruppan	DMK
186	Sivaganga	S. Gunasekaran	CPI
187	Manamadurai (SC)	M. Gunasekaran	AIADMK
188	Melur	R. Samy	AIADMK
189	Madurai East	K. Tamilarasan	AIADMK
190	Sholavandan (SC)	M. V. Karuppiah	AIADMK
191	Madurai North	A. K. Bose	AIADMK
192	Madurai South	R. Annadurai	CPI(M)
193	Madurai Central	R. Sundarrajan	DMDK
194	Madurai West	Sellur K. Raju	AIADMK
195	Thiruparankundram	A. K. T. Raja	DMDK
196	Thirumangalam	M. Muthuramalingam	AIADMK
197	Usilampatti	P. V. Kathiravan	AIFB
198	Andipatti	Thanga Tamil Selvan	AIADMK
199	Periyakulam (SC)	A. Laser	CPI(M)
200	Bodinayakanur	O. Panneerselvam	AIADMK
201	Cumbum	N. Eramakrishnan	DMK
202	Rajapalayam	K. Gopalsamy	AIADMK
203	Srivilliputhur (SC)	V. Ponnupandi	CPI
204	Sattur	R. B. Udhaya Kumar	AIADMK
205	Sivakasi	K. T. Rajenthra Bhalaji	AIADMK
206	Virudhunagar	K. Pandiarajan	DMDK
207	Aruppukkottai	Vaigaichelvan	AIADMK
208	Tiruchuli	Thangam Thenarasu	DMK
209	Paramakudi (SC)	S. Sundararaj	AIADMK
210	Tiruvadanai	Suba. Thangavelan	DMK
211	Ramanathapuram	M. H. Jawahirullah	MMK
212	Mudhukulathur	M. Murugan	AIADMK
213	Vilathikulam	G. V. Markandayan	AIADMK
214	Thoothukkudi	S.T. Chellapandian	AIADMK
215	Tiruchendur	Anitha R. Radhakrishnan	DMK
216	Srivaikuntam	S. P. Shanmuganathan	AIADMK
217	Ottapidaram (SC)	K. Krishnasamy	PT
218	Kovilpatti	Kadambur C. Raju	AIADMK
219	Sankarankovil (SC)	S. Muthuselvi	AIADMK
220	Vasudevanallur (SC)	S. Duraiappa	AIADMK
221	Kadayanallur	P. Chendur Pandian	AIADMK
222	Tenkasi	R. Sarath Kumar	AISMK
223	Alangulam	P. G. Rajendran	AIADMK
224	Tirunelveli	Nainar Nagenthran	AIADMK
225	Ambasamudram	E. Subaya	AIADMK
226	Palayamkottai	T. P. M. Mohideen Khan	DMK
227	Nanguneri	A. Narayanan	AISMK
228	Radhapuram	S. Michael Rayappan	DMDK
229	Kanniyakumari	K. T. Pachaimal	AIADMK
230	Nagercoil	A. Nanjil Murugesan	AIADMK
231	Colachal	J. G. Prince	INC
232	Padmanabhapuram	Pushpa Leela Alban	DMK
233	Vilavancode	S. Vijayadharani	INC
234	Killiyoor	S. John Jacob	INC
235	Nominated member	Nancy Ann Cynthia Francis	NA
Source: Tamil Nadu Legislative Assembly, Govt. of Tamil Nadu

== See also ==
- Government of Tamil Nadu
- Legislature of Tamil Nadu
