= K. Paramalai =

Indian politician

Member of the Legislative Assembly to Tamil Nadu Legislative Assembly
- In office 1980–1989
- Preceded by: V. M. Subramanian
- Succeeded by: V. M. Subramanian
- In office 2001–2006
- Preceded by: K. Thangamani
- Succeeded by: M. Gunasekaran
- Constituency: Manamadurai

Personal details
- Party: Indian National Congress; Tamil Maanila Congress (1996-2004)

K. Paramalai is an Indian politician and former Member of the Legislative Assembly of Tamil Nadu. He was elected to the Tamil Nadu legislative assembly as an independent candidate from Manamadurai constituency in 1980 election, as an Indian National Congress candidate in 1984 election and as a Tamil Maanila Congress (Moopanar) candidate in 2001 election.

== Electoral career ==
=== Tamil Nadu Legislative Assembly Elections ===
Elections	Constituency	Party	Result	Vote percentage	Opposition Candidate	Opposition Party	Opposition vote percentage
1967 Madras State Legislative Assembly election	Kadaladi	INC	Lost	32.68	M. Alangaram	DMK	61.50
1977 Tamil Nadu Legislative Assembly election	Manamadurai	INC	Lost	37.36	V. M. Subramanian	AIADMK	40.23
1980 Tamil Nadu Legislative Assembly election	Manamadurai	Independent	Won	50.52	U. Krishnan	INC	48.40
1984 Tamil Nadu Legislative Assembly election	Manamadurai	INC	Won	61.67	U. Krishnan	TNC(K)	29.25
1989 Tamil Nadu Legislative Assembly election	Manamadurai	INC	Lost	23.94	P. Duraipandi	DMK	36.08
2001 Tamil Nadu Legislative Assembly election	Manamadurai	TMC	Won	57.06	S. P. Kirubanidhi	BJP	36.00
2006 Tamil Nadu Legislative Assembly election	Manamadurai	INC	Lost	38.40	M. Gunasekaran	AIADMK	48.87

=== Lok Sabha Elections ===
Elections	Constituency	Party	Result	Vote percentage	Opposition Candidate	Opposition Party	Opposition vote percentage
1971 Indian general election	Dharapuram	INC(O)	Lost	35.62	C. T. Dhandapani	DMK	64.38
