= A. Tamilarasi =

Indian politician

Member of the Tamil Nadu Legislative Assembly
- In office 2 May 2021 – 4 May 2026
- Preceded by: S. Nagarajan
- Constituency: Manamadurai
- In office 11 May 2006 – 13 May 2011
- Preceded by: P. Ponnambalam
- Succeeded by: N. Subramanian
- Constituency: Samayanallur

Minister for Adi Dravidar and Tribal Welfare, Government of Tamil Nadu
- In office 13 May 2006 – 15 May 2011
- Chief Minister: M. Karunanidhi
- Preceded by: C. Karuppasamy

President of Panchayat Union
- In office 2001–2006
- Constituency: Madurai West Panchayat Union

Personal details
- Born: 5 April 1976 (age 50) Paramakudi, Tamil Nadu, India
- Party: Dravida Munnetra Kazhagam
- Spouse: Ravikumar
- Occupation: MLA of Manamadurai legislative constituency
- Website: Tmt TAMILARASI. A

A. Tamilarasi Ravikumar (born 5 April 1976) is a india Politician and former member of Tamil Nadu Legislative Assembly, former Minister for Adi Dravidar and Tribal Welfare 2006-2011 Tamil Nadu, elected from Manamadurai constituency in the 2021 election. She was born in Paramakudi and has obtained her bachelor's degree in Commerce.

== Political career ==
Tamilarasi Ravikumar was elected as the President of Madurai West Panchayat Union in 2001. She was elected to the Tamil Nadu legislative assembly from Samayanallur constituency in 2006 election as a Dravida Munnetra Kazhagam candidate. She served as the former Minister for Adi-Dravidar and Tribal Welfare in Tamil Nadu state of India from 2006-2011.

== Elections contested ==
Elections	Constituency	Result	Vote percentage	Opposition Candidate	Opposition Party	Opposition vote percentage
2006 Tamil Nadu Legislative Assembly election	Samayanallur	Won	43.45	P. Lakshmi	AIADMK	41.48
2011 Tamil Nadu Legislative Assembly election	Manamadurai	Lost	43.01	M. Gunasekaran	AIADMK	51.68
2021 Tamil Nadu Legislative Assembly election	Manamadurai	Won	43.91	S. Nagarajan	AIADMK	36.99
2026 Tamil Nadu Legislative Assembly election	Manamadurai	Lost	%			%
