= Maridhas Malaichamy =

Indian Tamil-language YouTuber

- Born: Madurai, Tamil Nadu, India
- Occupation: YouTuber

YouTube information
- Channel: Maridhas Answers
- Subscribers: 1.19 million
- Views: 399 million
- Last updated: 4 August 2026

Maridhas Malaichamy, known by his YouTube channel Maridhas Answers, is a right-wing YouTuber and social media influencer from Madurai, Tamil Nadu. He promotes the Bharatiya Janata Party (BJP) through his social media posts.

According to fact-checkers, Maridhas has published fake news in his YouTube channel. Maridhas has faced numerous cases and is currently facing various cases for defamation, forgery, publishing fake news, promoting hatred and enmity among religious groups, among others.

== Early life ==
Maridhas hails from Anna Nagar, Madurai, Tamil Nadu. He has a post-graduate degree in engineering and worked as a college lecturer. He has written a book titled Why I support Narendra Modi.

== YouTube career ==
He operates a YouTube channel named Maridhas Answers and publishes propaganda videos to promote BJP. He is also active in social media and publishes content supporting the BJP. Maridhas has been critical of the Dravida Munnetra Kazhagam (DMK) party in social media. He is also critical of leaders who had spoken in support of Tamil nationalism. He is a right-wing social media influencer.

In 2020, Maridhas published a counterfeit email in July 2020, impersonating Vinay Sarawagi, the Associate Execute Editor of News18 India. Vinay Sarawagi later took legal action against Maridhas.

Times of India reported that Maridhas has constantly addressed Journalists using derogatory language such as beggars, bootlickers, mercenary and made personal attacks against them.

=== Fake news ===
An International Fact Checking Network certified fact checker, Youturn, reported that Maridhas has deliberately spread fake news and rumors through his YouTube channel. The fact checker also reported that Maridhas is trying to create religious divisions among people in Tamil Nadu by releasing videos based on rumours and lies.

Maridhas in July 2019 published fake news claiming there were less toilets for women in Tamil Nadu government schools and 25 million students were affected due the absence of Navodhya schools in Tamil Nadu. In another video, Maridhas published fake news claiming that "25 million school students were affected from 2006 to 2011 due the implementation of Samacheer Kalvi" while Samacheer Kalvi was implemented after 2011. Maridhas in May 2021 published false news related to the Tamil Nadu government's implementation of free pass for women in public buses.

== Lawsuits and arrests ==
=== Videos against MK Stalin and DMK ===
In 2019, Maridhas had published several videos critical of DMK, the primary opposition party in Tamil Nadu at the time and its leaders. DMK registered a complaint with the local police accusing Maridhas of uploading videos "which are entirely baseless, false and intended to create public mischief."

On 5 August 5, 2019, DMK leader MK Stalin had issued a statement in which he called the manner of abrogation of Article 370 as "anti-democratic, unconstitutional and against federal principles". In their complaint, DMK accused Maridhas of purposefully misconstruing the political stand of DMK, as support for terrorists. Maridhas was "portraying Muslims in Kashmir as terrorists and, thereby, creating ill-will against that group of people... Maridhas primarily intends to disturb public tranquillity and promote enmity and incite hatred between religious groups, namely Muslims and non-Muslims. Mr Maridhas uses the recent policy statements issued by the DMK to buttress his efforts to ultimately create public mischief against Muslims, who are a minority in India."

The DMK accused Maridhas of running a website seeking donation and using the donated money "to commit crimes and offences".

The complaint caused social media debates among his followers and critics.

=== Anti-Muslim commentary ===
In March 2020, Maridhas uploaded YouTube videos blaming the Muslim community and the Tabligi Jamaat for the spread of the COVID-19 pandemic in India. In the video, he falsely claimed without any evidence, that "coronavirus is being purposefully transmitted by (Muslim) terrorists to slaughter innocent people all across the world."

Maridhas was booked in April 2020 by Tirunelveli police for stoking communal sentiments on grounds of malicious comments against the Muslim community in his YouTube channel in response to a complaint over his coronavirus videos. Maridhas was arrested on 16 December 2021 for the case. He was charged under sections 292(A) (publishing grossly indecent or scurrilous matter or matter intended for blackmail), 295(A) (deliberate and malicious acts, intended to outrage religious feelings by insulting its religion or religious beliefs) and 505(ii) (statement creating or promoting enmity or ill-will between classes) of the Indian Penal Code and 67 (publishing or transmitting obscene material in electronic form) of the Information Technology Act. On 20 December 2021, the court ordered notice to the state and sought a response.

On 22 December 2021, the Madras High Court judge G.R. Swaminathan quashed the first information report of this case citing the fact that the Tablighi Jamaat meeting already came under bitter and sharp criticism in the entire media in the earlier days of the pandemic and that a slightly exaggerated comment by Maridhas's video is acceptable. The court also observed that the video did not question the religious belief of Muslims but only attacked the "irresponsible conduct" of the Tablighi attendees of the congregation.

=== Forgery and defamation ===
In July 2020, Maridhas was sued by the Vinay Sarawagi, the Associate Execute Editor of News18 India accusing Maridhas of forging an email to attempt to evoke Hindu religious sentiments, incite people to attack and commit crimes and encourage false claims with the intention of promoting hatred among religious groups and communities. Vinay stated that the fake email damaged both his reputation and that of his channel. The Chennai Cyber Crime Branch registered a case on charges of forgery, IT Act and damage to reputation against unnamed people for creating and circulating a fake email

In July 2020, Maridhas was sued by senior editor M. Gunasekaran and senior anchor Jeeva Sagapthan of News18 Tamil Nadu accusing Maridhas of defamation, publishing fake news against them and speaking about their personal lives without any evidence. They also filed a civil defamation suit of ₹15 million. In the same month, News18 Tamil Nadu filed a case against Maridhas, accusing him of defaming its editor and journalists, attempting to stir communal unrest and provoking and outraging the feelings Hindus. The Madras High Court restricted Maridhas from posting defamatory videos against News18 Tamil Nadu and its journalists and directed him to delete all defamatory videos previously posted by him against the channel. In August 2020, the Chennai police reached his house in Madurai for questioning and seized his laptop.

=== Bipin Rawat's death ===
In December 2021, Maridhas posted a controversial tweet about the Coonoor chopper crash that killed the Chief of Defence Staff Bipin Rawat and 12 others, in which he insinuated that Tamil Nadu was "turning into a Kashmir" under the DMK rule. He deleted the tweet later on. In a separate tweet, he alleged without evidence that DMK and DK supporters had made fun of Rawat's death. On 9 December 2021, Maridhas was arrested by cyber crime police for the tweets. BJP executives and functionaries gather in front of his house and quarrelled with the police. His arrest was condemned by Seeman and Tamil Nadu BJP President K. Annamalai. His arrest was welcomed by the Chennai press club. Judge G.R. Swaminathan of the Madurai bench of the Madras High Court later quashed the FIR registered against Maridhas observing that his actions did not attract the charges against him.
