= Samacheer Kalvi =

Indian state education department

Tamil Nadu Uniform System of School Education
- Mission statement: Uniform System of School Education
- Commercial?: No
- Type of project: School Education
- Location: Tamil Nadu
- Owner: Government of Tamil Nadu through Department of School Education (Tamil Nadu)
- Established: 30 November 2009

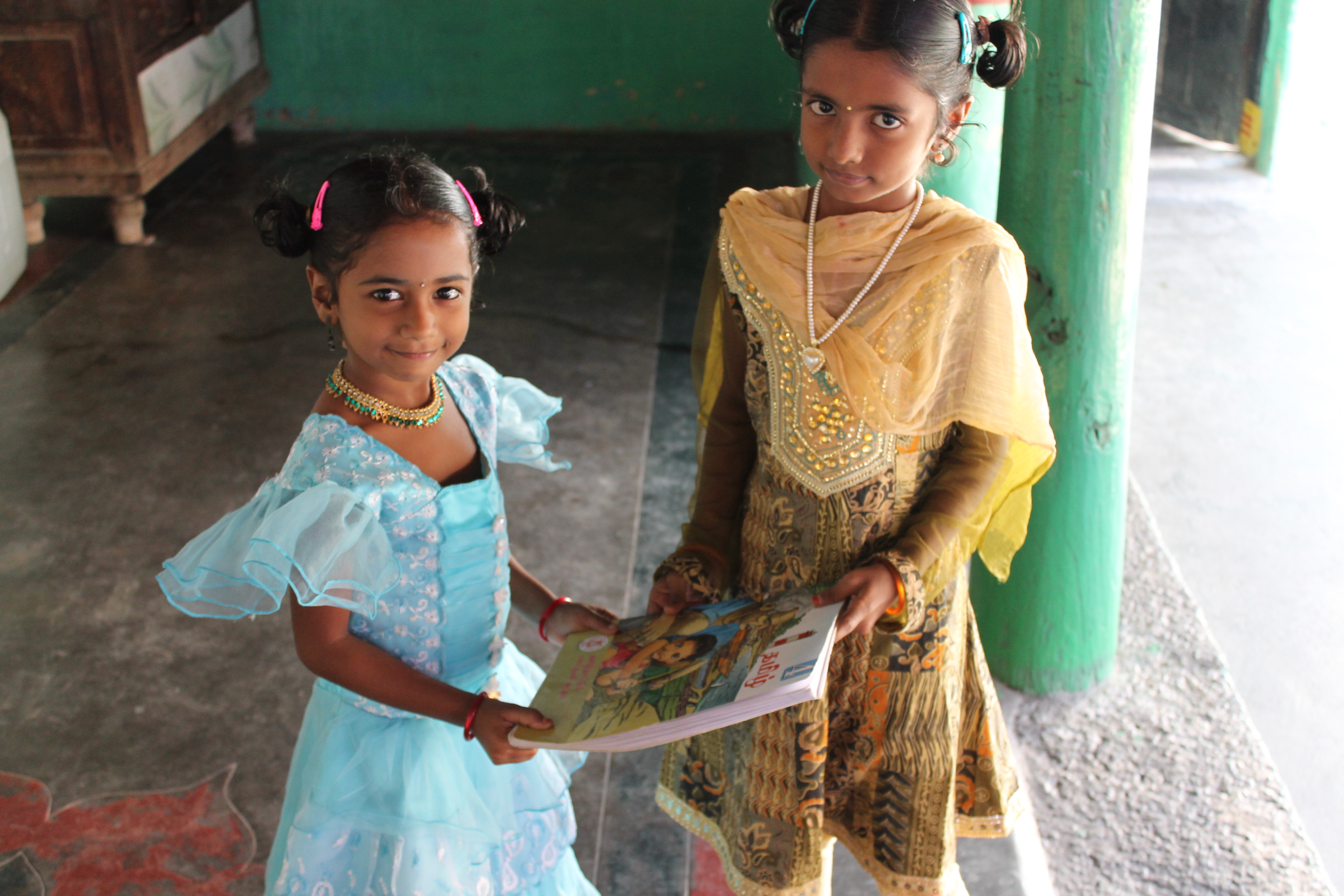
Two children from Tamil Nadu holding a Samacheer Kalvi textbook

Samacheer Kalvi or Tamil Nadu Uniform System of School Education or Equitable education system is a School Education Department of Government of Tamil Nadu, India programme to integrate the various school educational systems within the state. Uniform System of School Education was implemented by Tamil Nadu Uniform System of School Education Act 2010 which paves way for quality education to all children without any discrimination based on their economic, social or cultural background. The new system of education was introduced for classes I and VI in the 2010 academic year.

The system was introduced by Karunanidhi-led DMK government. It was scrapped by Jayalalithaa-led AIADMK government shortly after assuming office in May 2011. The scrapping was challenged in the court. The Supreme Court of India in its verdict in August 2011, directed the AIADMK government to implement it.

== Background ==
There are over 12 million students in four streams of school education comprising about 45,000 state board schools, 11,000 matriculation schools, 25 oriental schools and 50 Anglo-Indian schools, with different syllabus, textbooks and schemes of examinations.

== Need for a unified system ==
The main need for this system to be proclaimed as the syllabus in Tamil Nadu, was that all the school students must have uniform study, diminishing the variations between the Matriculation or CBSE Students and the Government school Students. The motivation for a uniform syllabus was obtained from the Ex. Chief Minister of Tamil Nadu, K. Kamaraj who was the first to initiate a uniform dress code in schools to reduce the differentiation between students from households with varying income. Tamil Nadu government also published school books in digital format.

== Litigation ==
Jayalalithaa Government dropped the Samacheer Kalvi syllabus for the 2011–2012 academic year as the books had content in praise of DMK's leaders. But, the High Court of Tamil Nadu ordered that Samacheer Kalvi must come into immediate effect. Tamil Nadu Government moved the Supreme Court and the apex court refused to stay the order of the High Court and insisted that the books need to be distributed on or before 2 August 2011.

On 9 August 2011, the Supreme Court of India rejected Tamil Nadu State Government's request to drop the Tamil Nadu Uniform System of School Education and also directed the state government to implement the Uniform System of School Education (Amendment) Act within 10 days i.e., within 19 August 2011. The Supreme Court of India in its order said that any sort of objectionable material such as personal glorification, self publicity and promotion involved, could be deleted, rather than putting the operation of the Act 2010 in abeyance.

On 23 February 2022, a public interest litigation petition was filed the Madras High Court seeking a direction to the State government to adopt the National Council of Educational Research and Training (NCERT) syllabus for State Board schools. The petitioners claimed that Samacheer Kalvi was not helping the students crack the competitive exams. The HC dismissed the petition, at the stage of admission. First Division Bench of Chief Justice Munishwar Nath Bhandari and Justice D. Bharatha Chakravarthy did not entertain the case and said that it was for the government and not the court to decide the appropriate type of syllabus for schools.
