= Krishnaswami =

Krishnaswami or Krishnaswamy is a South Indian name, and may refer to:

- A. A. Krishnaswami Ayyangar, mathematician
- A. Krishnaswamy, politician
- Alladi Krishnaswamy Iyer, lawyer
- K. A. Krishnaswamy, former minister of Tamil Nadu
- K. Subramanyam, film director
- Krishnaswami Alladi, mathematician
- Krishnaswami Iyengar, politician
- Krishnaswami Ramiah, geneticist
- Krishnaswami Srinivas Sanjivi, medical doctor
- Krishnaswamy Kasturirangan, space scientist
- Krishnaswamy Sundarji, former Chief of Army Staff of India
- Mani Krishnaswami, carnatic vocalist
- S. Krishnaswami Aiyangar, historian
- S. Krishnaswamy, filmmaker
- Sethunathasarma Krishnaswami, geochemist
- Srinivasapuram Krishnaswamy, former Chief of the Air Staff of India
- Uma Krishnaswami, writer of children's literature
- V. D. Krishnaswami, archaeologist
- V. Krishnaswamy Iyer, lawyer
