= Alaguvelu =

Alaguvelu (Tamil: அழகுவேலு) is a Tamil patronymic surname and masculine given name. Notable people with the surname include:

- K. Alaguvelu, Indian politician
- S. Alaguvelu, Indian politician
