= D. Elangovan =

Indian politician (born 1982)

Member of the Tamil Nadu Legislative Assembly
- In office 11 May 2026 – Present
- Leader: Mr. C. Joseph Vijay, Chief minister of Tamil Nadu
- Preceded by: A. Tamilarasi
- Constituency: Manamadurai

Personal details
- Party: Tamilaga Vettri Kazhagam

D. Elangovan (born 1982) is an Indian politician from Tamil Nadu. He is a member of the Tamil Nadu Legislative Assembly from the Manamadurai Assembly constituency, which is reserved for Scheduled Caste community, in Sivaganga parliamentary constituency, representing the Tamilaga Vettri Kazhagam.

== Early life and education ==
Elangovan is from Thirupuvanam, Sivaganga district, Tamil Nadu. He completed his Secondary education at Mangaiyarkarasi Higher Secondary School, Madurai in 1999 and did his higher education at Government Higher Secondary School, Keeladi. He holds a Bachelors degree in Pharmacy from Ultra College of Pharmacy, Annanagar, Madurai finished in 2009. He is a professional photographer and his wife runs a grocery store. He declared assets worth Rs.12 lakhs in his affidavit to the Election Commission of India and has no criminal cases registered against him.

== Career ==
Elangovan became an MLA for the first time winning the Manamadurai Assembly constituency representing the Tamilaga Vettri Kazhagam in the 2026 Tamil Nadu Legislative Assembly election. He polled 69,971 votes and defeated his nearest rival and sitting MLA, A. Tamilarasi of the Dravida Munnetra Kazhagam, by a margin of 1,208 votes.
