= K. Cheemaichamy =

Indian politician

K. Cheemaichamy is an Indian politician and former Member of the Legislative Assembly of Tamil Nadu state in India. He was elected to the Tamil Nadu legislative assembly as a Swatantra Party candidate from Manamadurai constituency in 1962 and 1967 elections.
