= Second Panneerselvam ministry =

Government of Tamil Nadu, India (2014–2015)

- 16th Ministry of Tamil Nadu
- Date formed: 28 September 2014
- Date dissolved: 23 May 2015

People and organisations
- Head of state: Governor Konijeti Rosaiah
- Head of government: O. Panneerselvam
- Member parties: AIADMK
- Status in legislature: Majority
- Opposition party: DMDK
- Opposition leader: Vijayakanth

History
- Election: 2011
- Legislature term: 5 Years
- Predecessor: Fourth Jayalalithaa ministry
- Successor: Fifth Jayalalithaa ministry

O. Panneerselvam assumed the office after previous Chief Minister Jayalalithaa was forced to resign in the year 2014. O. Panneerselvam her trusted aide assumed the office then resigned after her return on 23 May 2015.

== Cabinet ministers ==
S.no	Name	Constituency	Designation	Portfolios	Party
Chief Minister
1.	O. Panneerselvam	Bodinayakkanur	Chief Minister	Public; Home; Police; Indian Administrative Service; Indian Police Service; Indian Forest Service; District Revenue Officers; General Administration; Finance; Public Works	AIADMK
Cabinet Ministers
2.	Natham R. Viswanathan	Natham	Minister for Electricity, Prohibition and Excise	Electricity; Non-Conventional Energy Development; Prohibition and Excise; Molasses and Prevention of Corruption Act	
3.	Edappadi Palaniswami	Edappadi	Minister for Highways and Minor Ports	Highways; Minor Ports	AIADMK
4.	Sellur K. Raju	Madurai West	Minister for Co-operation	Co-operation	AIADMK
5.	S. P. Velumani	Thondamuthur	Minister for Municipal Administration, Rural Development and Implementation of Special Programme	Municipal Administration; Rural Development; Panchayats and Panchayat Unions; Poverty Alleviation Programmes; Rural Indebtedness; Urban and Rural Water Supply; Implementation of Special Programme	AIADMK
6.	K.A. Jayapal	Nagapattinam	Minister for Fisheries	Fisheries and Fisheries Development Corporation	AIADMK
7.	P. Palaniappan	Pappireddipatti	Minister for Higher Education	Higher Education	AIADMK
8.	B. Valarmathi	Thousand Lights	Minister for Social Welfare and Nutritious Noon Meal Programme	Social Welfare including Women's and Children's Welfare; Orphanages and Correctional Administration; Integrated Child Development and Beggar Homes; Welfare of the Differently Abled and Social Reforms; Nutritious Noon Meal Programme	AIADMK
9.	P. Thangamani	Kumarapalayam	Minister for Industries	Industries; Steel Control; Mines and Minerals	AIADMK
10.	N. D. Venkatachalam	Perundurai	Minister for Environment	Environment; Pollution Control	AIADMK
11.	R. Kamaraj	Krishnarayapuram	Minister for Food and Civil Supplies	Food; Civil Supplies; Consumer Protection and Price Control	AIADMK
12.	S. Gokula Indira	Anna Nagar	Minister for Handlooms and Textiles	Handlooms and Textiles	AIADMK
13.	R. Vaithilingam	Orathanadu	Minister for Housing and Urban Development	Housing; Rural Housing and Housing Development; Slum Clearance Board and Accommodation Control; Town Planning; Urban Development; Chennai Metropolitan Development Authority	AIADMK
14.	Dr. C. Vijayabaskar	Viralimalai	Minister for Health	Health; Medical Education; Family Welfare	AIADMK
15.	K.T. Rajenthra Bhalaji	Sivakasi	Minister for Information and Special Programme Implementation	Information and Publicity; Special Programme Implementation	AIADMK
16.	R. B. Udhayakumar	Sattur	Minister for Revenue	Revenue; District Revenue Establishment; Deputy Collectors	AIADMK
17.	B. V. Ramanaa	Thiruvallur	Minister for Milk and Dairy Development	Milk and Dairy Development	AIADMK
18.	S.P. Shunmuganathan	Srivaikuntam	Minister for Tourism	Tourism; Tourism Development Corporation	AIADMK
19.	M.C. Sampath	Cuddalore	Minister for Commercial Taxes and Registration	Commercial Taxes; Registration and Stamp Act	AIADMK
20.	P. Mohan	Sankarapuram	Minister for Rural Industries and Labour	Rural Industries; Labour	AIADMK
21.	K.C. Veeramani	Jolarpet	Minister for School Education	School Education	AIADMK
22.	V. Senthil Balaji	Karur	Minister for Transport	Transport; Nationalised Transport and Motor Vehicles Act	AIADMK
23.	Mukkur N. Subramanian	Cheyyar	Minister for Information Technology	Information Technology	AIADMK
24.	N. Subramanian	Gandharvakottai	Minister for Adi Dravidar and Tribal Welfare	Adi Dravidar Welfare; Hill Tribes	AIADMK
25.	S. Abdul Rahim	Avadi	Minister for Backward Classes and Minorities Welfare	Backward Classes and Most Backward Classes and Denotified Communities	AIADMK
26.	T.K.M. Chinnayya	Tambaram	Minister for Animal Husbandry	Animal Husbandry	AIADMK
27.	T. P. Poonachi	Manachanallur	Minister for Khadi and Village Industries	Khadi; Village Industries	AIADMK
28.	M.S.M. Anandan	Tiruppur (North)	Minister for Forests	Forests	AIADMK
29.	P. Chendur Pandian	Kadayanallur	Minister for	Hindu Religious and Charitable Endowments	AIADMK
30.	S.S. Krishnamoorthy	Kalasapakkam	Minister for Agriculture	Agriculture	AIADMK
