= Manamadurai =

Town in Sivagangai, Tamil Nadu, India

- Town
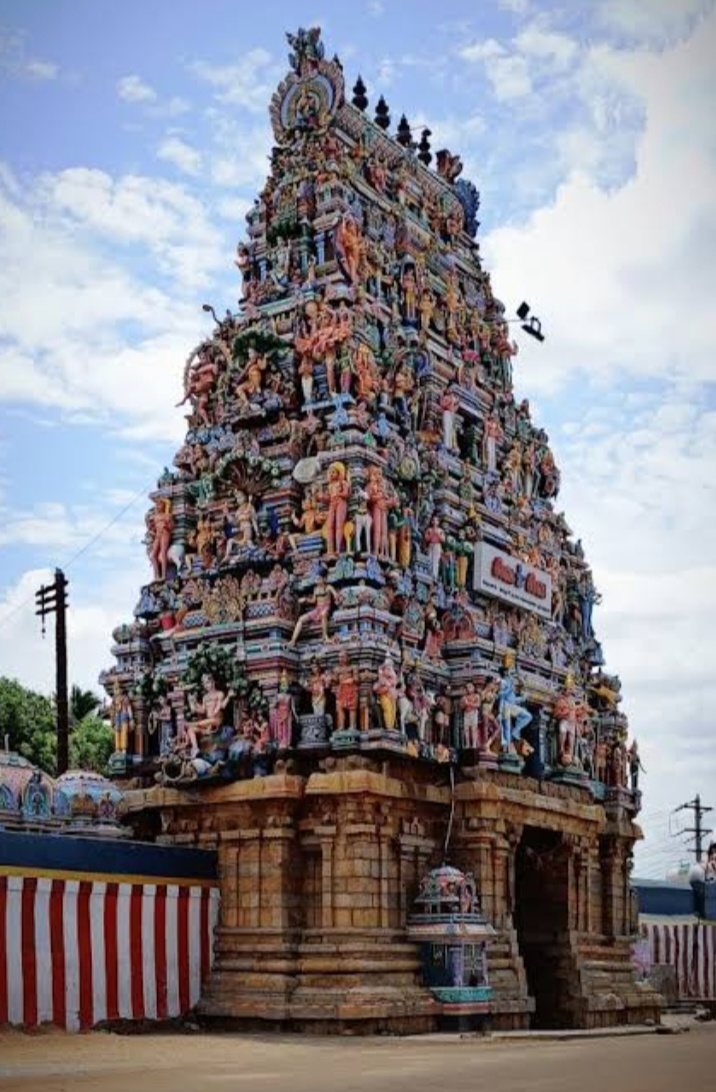
- Aanandhavalli Amman temple

- Manamadurai, Tamil Nadu
- Coordinates: 9.689000°N 78.458100°E
- Country: India
- State: Tamil Nadu
- District: Sivaganga district
- Established: 1912

Government
  - Type: Second Grade Municipality
  - Body: Municipality
  - Member of Legislative assembly (M.L.A): D. Elangovan (Tamilaga Vettri Kazhagam (TVK))
  - Member of Parliament (M.P): Karti Chidambaram
- Elevation: 90 m (300 ft)

Population
  - Total: 32,257 (2,011 Population Census)
  - Density: 296/km^{2} (770/sq mi)
  - Sister town: Thiruppuvanam

Languages
  - Official (Tamil, English): Tamil
- Time zone: UTC+5:30 (IST)
- PIN: 630 606 (Manamadurai Head post office)
- Telephone code: 04574
- Vehicle registration: TN 63 (Sivagangai RTO)
- Prime Minister: Narendra Modi
- Chief Minister: C. Joseph Vijay
- Governor: Rajendra Arlekar
- Collector: Mr. P. Akash I.A.S

Manamadurai is a Town in Sivaganga district in the Indian state of Tamil Nadu, Situated 58 kilometres away from the heart of Madurai on the Cochin - Dhanushkodi National Highway. It is the 4th largest town in the Sivaganga district followed by Karaikudi, Sivaganga and Devakottai. Manamadurai represents its seat in Manamadurai legislative assembly constituency. It is a river-based settlement town developed on banks of river Vaigai around 2 BCE. The river flows through the core of town dividing the town into higher western banks and lower eastern banks.

== Etymology ==
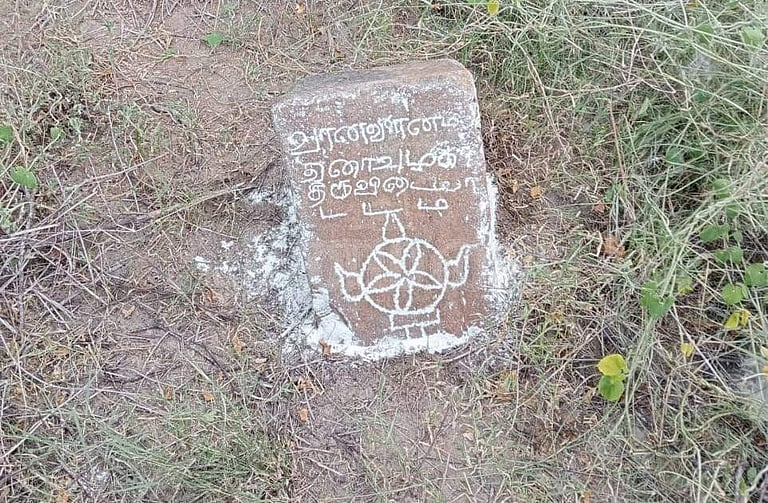
Inscription dating to 1700 A.D.

The Name Manamadurai is said to be derived from Vanara Veera Madurai. As mentioned in the epic Ramayana, Lord Rama, Hanuman and "Vaanara Sena" - the Monkey Force which embarked on a search for Sita, ended in the banks of the river Vaigai, hence all of them took a bath, slept a night here, and left. Hence the name was applied to this place, with the Sanskrit word Vaanaram, meaning "monkey" and veera, meaning "powerful". As centuries rolled, it became Vaana Vīra Madurai, then Vaana Madurai, and finally became Manamadurai. An inscription with a low relief was found at a site near the Thulukkanendhal village of Manamadurai Panchayat Union. It was inspected by the research personnels of The Pandiya Naadu Culture society and they carbon dated it to 1700 A.D. The sculpture in Tamil read as /ʋaːn̪a ʋiːɾa maðɯɾaɪ̯ aɻaɡaɾ t̪iɾuʋiɖaɪ̯jaːʈʈam/ which literally discusses about the land donation of someone to the Azhagar Temple in Manamadurai. Thiruvidaiyattam refers to a stone which sculpted on resemblance of Land donation. And the wheel like structure below the text is actually present in the coin of the Madurai Nayaks who ruled Madurai from 1529 to 1815.

== Architecture ==
The City was designed pre historically around the Anandavalli Amman Temple, The Quadrangular road around the temple is the Tēr Veedhis (Car streets), and every concentric quadrangle road is filled with houses, community wise hierarchially arranged. Facing the River Vaigai. Similarly on the other bank, which was fully farm & fields, later urbanized on construction of Veera Azhagar Temple by Madurai Nayaks. Same type of Dravidian Quadrangled roads concentrically surrounding the temple, people residing together in communities, while the pottery artisans alone live too close to the banks for easy collection of mud.

== Upgradation of Manamadurai town Panchayat to municipality ==
The Tamil Nadu Government Department of Municipal Administration and Metro Water Supply Additional Chief Secretary Shiv das Meena issued an ordinance for the Promotion of Manamadurai Selection grade town Panchayat to Manamadurai Municipality on 16 October 2021.

== Political administration ==
Manamadurai falls under Manamadurai State assembly constituency and Sivaganga Loksabha constituency. For further details, see

- Manamadurai State assembly constituency
- Sivaganga Parliamentary Constituency

== Geography ==
Manamadurai is at 9.7°N 78.48°E. It has an average elevation of 121 metres (397 ft). The Vaigai river flows from north to south through Manamadurai and divides the town into Eastern bank and Western bank.

== Demographics ==
As of 2011 census of India, Total number of households in Manamadurai is 52,131. Manamadurai has a total population of 207,223. In which 50.39% (1,04,428) are Males and 49.61% (1,02,795) are Females. In which children below the age of 12 is 22,403. Literacy rate is 69.99% (1,45,052)

Religion in Manamadurai (2011)
Religion	Percent(%)
Hinduism	60.17%
Islam	29.70%
Christianity	8.05%
others	02.08%

Community Distribution (2011)
Community	Percent(%)
Backward and General Classes	77.775%
Scheduled Castes	22.224%
Scheduled Tribes	0.001%

== Geographical indication ==
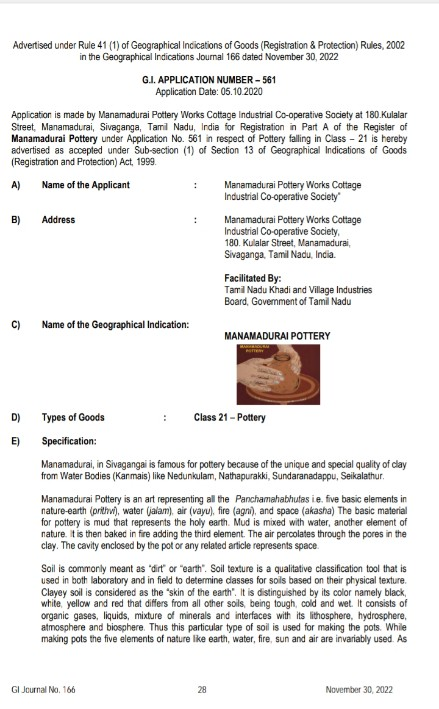
Certificate of Geographical Indications for Manamadurai Pottery

This town is famous for manufacturing Ghatam musical instruments, clay pots, clay horses, and other clay items. The Manamadurai Pottery Works Co-operative Society - a renowned local community of Artisans traditionally working on Mud crafts, applied for Geographical indication for Manamadurai Pottery on 28 July 2016. The Geographical Indications Registry Of India under World Trade Organizations Act, issued the Certificate of Geographical Indication for Manamadurai Pottery officially on 31 March 2023 on the journal numbered 166 and certificate number 446.

== The Chithirai Thiruvizha ==
As Similar to Madurai's Chithirai Thiruvizha and Meenakshi Tirukalyanam, Manamadurai people too celebrate the Chithirai Thiruvizha and Aananthavalli Tirukkalyanam.

The 'Chithirai Thiruvizha' festival is celebrated every year in the Tamil month of Chithirai (April–May) for 15 days. The festival commences by Hoisting the Holy flag in the Temple's sacred flagpole and this occasion is called Kodiyettram. This is a festival without caste and Religion Discrimination celebrated by all people in and around Manamadurai together in the riverbanks. As the thiruvizha begins, the Aananthavalli ascends the throne as Queen of Manamadurai in a Ritual called "Pattabishekam". After pattabishekam, she parades around the town in different Vahanams namely Simma Vaahanam, Mayil Vaahanam, Rishaba vaahanam, Garuda Vaahanam, Nandhi Vaahanam and finally Kamadhenu Vaahanam for 8 days. then, she marries her destinied Husband Somanatha. Lord Shiva Incarnates as Somanatha, a common man. Aananthavalli decides to marry him. they both get married in a marvelous manner. People call it "Sri Aananthavalli – Somanatha Tirukkalyanam" and the next day, they are paraded around the Car streets (Thēr Veedhis) in the huge Chariot hauled by local People with help of ropes tied to chariot. This occasion is called Thirutherottam. The festival crowd reaches the peak during the Azhagar Uprising on the Vaigai River on the morning of first full moon day (Chithra Pournami) of Chithirai. It happens to commemorate that, Veera Azhagar's Sister Aanandhavalli marries Somanatha without the presence of her brother Azhagar as he delayed to the marriage. He arrives lately and uprises into the Vaigai River in his golden horse on the dawn of first full moon day of Chithirai. The Aananthavalli and Somanatha immediately rushes to riverbanks and get the praisings from Azhagar on the riverbanks. The next day, the slightly full moon of Chithirai, all the local people of Manamadurai and surrounding areas gather in the riverbanks at night to celebrate "Nila Chōru" – The moonlight feast. People believe that Newly married couples Aanandhavalli and Somanatha will need deep sleep in silence, hence people leave their house and spend the night on river banks, Even the temple is closed with both their Idols being kept on Palliyarai within the temple premises. People who cannot come to riverbanks celebrate it on their home terraces. The street food vendors in and around Manamadurai Gather here and make their stalls. Amusement Rides, Circus, Family Games, Bike Stunt Amusements, and fireworks display, and toy shops and fruit vendors make this festival unforgettable. The amusement rides were temporarily set up on the riverbanks. Temporary stalls were made, and taxes were collected from the vendors by contractors.

=== Vaigai flood threat ===
As the Tamil Nadu Government usually opens the Vaigai Dam located in Theni for the Madurai's Chithirai Thiruvizha, Sivaganga district collector usually issues an counter-ordinance to stop the water in Madurai itself as the Thiruvizha setup were made at Manamadurai riverbeds. And orders to close the Viraganoor Barrage dam, So the River water won't affect Manamadurai and the Thiruvizha won't be spoiled by river water. But during 2022 and 2023 festival, the Government failed to close the Viraganoor Barrage dam and ruined the Manamadurai's Festival leaving the riverbanks messy and floody.

== Other festivals ==
The annual urus (Santhanakoodu) festival marking the martyrdom day of the Panch shuhadas is commemorated on the 17th of the Islamic month of Jamadil Awwal every Hijri year.

Other prominent Hindu Festivals include The Dhayapuram Mariyamman Thiruvizha, Burma Colony Santhana Mariyamman Thiruvizha, A.Vilakulam Niraigulathu Ayyanar Thiruvizha, Thayamangalam Muthumaari Amman thiruvizha, Prathyangira Devi Sahasra Sandi Maha Yagnam, Sri Veera Azhagar Temple's Vaikuntha Ekadesi Sorga Vaasal Opening ceremony, Maha Shivaratri at Aananthavalli Somanathar Temple, Vaikasi Visakam & Panguni Uthiram at Vazhividu Murugan Temple, Aadi Ammavasai Thiruvizha at Annavasal Somanathaswamy Temple are some of them.

== Transport & accessibilities ==
=== Road ===
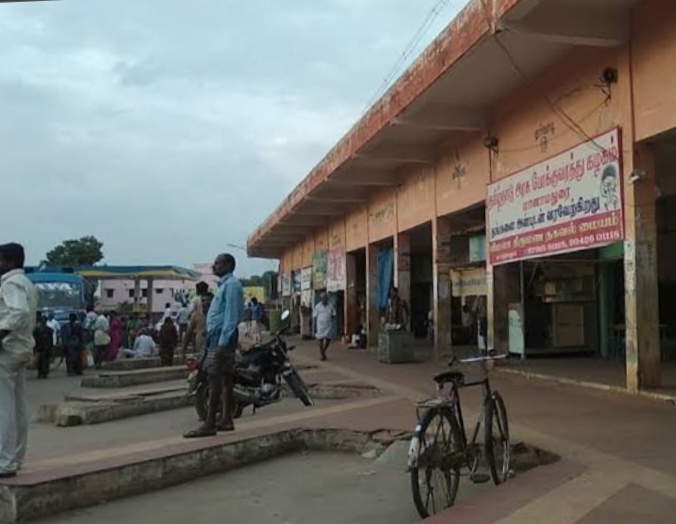
Manamadurai Bus stand

The Manamadurai Integrated Bus terminus is situated at Western bank of the town on Cochin – Dhanushkodi interstate Highway (Asian Highway; AH-45). It was formerly a two-lane road. Later, during 2017, a new fourway road was built from Viraganoor Ring Road (Madurai) with bypasses for every town and truck lay-by for every 5 kilometers and a petrol bulk every 4 kilometers throughout the highway. Initially it would take two hours to go to Madurai from Manamadurai. Now, this road makes it possible in 30 minutes. There are many TNSTC and TNSETC buses operated from various cities to Manamadurai. Some major stops for town buses inside the town includes SIPCOT, Udaikulam, Union office, Gandhi Statue, Devar Statue, Anna Statue, Old bus stand, By-pass

=== Railway ===
The Manamadurai Junction railway station is situated in southern part of the town at the Western Bank at 500 metres from the bus terminus.

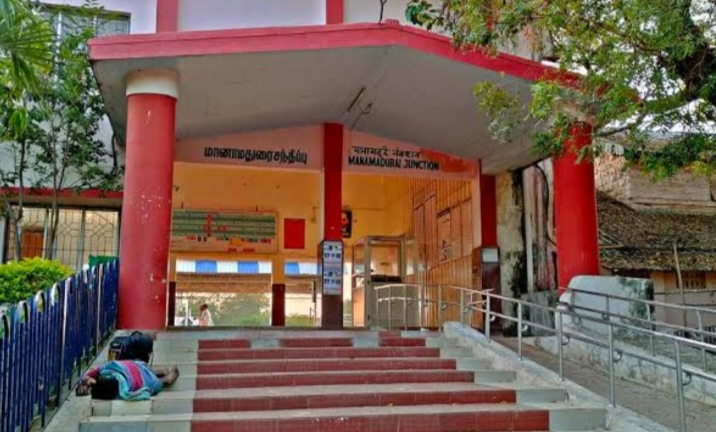
Facade Entrance of Manamadurai Junction

It is a major stop for all the trains running between Rameshwaram – Madurai, Rameswaram – Chennai and Virudhunagar – Karaikudi. The railway junction in manamadurai connects with Virudhunagar railway junction in the southwest, Madurai railway junction in the northwest, Rameswaram railway terminus in the southeast and Karaikudi railway junction in the northeast. The thrice-daily operating passenger train via Manamadurai connects the main cities of Virudhunagar and Tiruchirapalli via Sivaganga, Kallal, karaikudi, Chettinad devakkottai road, Thirumayam, Pudukkottai, Vellanur, keeranur. A thrice-daily passenger train runs between Madurai to Rameswaram via Tiruppuvanam, thiruppachethi, Manamadurai, paramakkudi, Ramanathapuram, Mandapam, pamban and also uses the Pamban Railway Bridge. The railway line between Manamadurai and Rameswaram became the country's first green train corridor.

Rameswaram – manamadurai – Madurai line and Virudhunagar – Manamadurai – Tiruchirapalli line's Electrification works are completed smoothly and trains are hauled by electric locomotives at an average speed of 110 km/h.

=== Airports ===
Manamadurai doesn't have its own Airport. Some of the airports near Manamadurai are

Madurai International Airport (57 km )

Tiruchirapalli International airport(143 km.),

Tuticorin Domestic Airport (160 km.)

The Nearest Naval Air station is located in Uchipuli called as INS Parundu at a distance of 85 kilometres

=== Medical accessibilities ===
- The Manamadurai Government Hospital is situated on the eastern banks on Thayamangalam road. It serves 24/7 Emergency Aid equipped with ECG, X-Ray, Labor wards, Free-of-cost Pharmacy, 20 beded Multi speciality ward, out patient block, Siddha medical ward, Vaccine point, Blood pressure and Insulin testing, Blood testing, Urinal and faecal testing, and a Intensive care unit with 24 hours duty doctors and staff nurses present. Two 108 Ambulance for emergency and referral cases and a TN Govt.Mother-child welfare vehicle to pick up and drop the labored women and their baby in their homes.
- Government Sivaganga Medical College hospital situated in Manamadurai-Sivaganga Main road about 18 kilometres from Manamadurai is the second and foremost important medical centre for People of Manamadurai
- Other prominent Hospitals include Nirubarajan Lifecare hospitals, The Tamil Nadu Leprosy Mission Hospital, Selva Hospital, Jayabal Nursing home and hospital, Unnamalai paediatric hospital

=== Safety accessibilities ===
The Tamil Nadu Government Fire Station is situated near SIPCOT Estate, Manamadurai take cares the fire safety for the whole Municipality

The Police station (law and order) present at Kannar street, All Women's police station near Panchayat Union office, Another police station (Law & order, Traffic) at SIPCOT Estate take measures to control the crime in the town

== Educational institutions ==
=== Colleges ===
- TN Government Arts & Science College (Affiliated to Alagappa University)
- M.A.Krishnaswamy College of Arts and Science for Women, N.Pudukottai., Manamadurai
- Matha School of Nursing, Annavasal post, Manamadurai
- Matha College of Arts and Science, Kilangattur, Manamadurai
- Matha College of Physiotherapy
- Government ITI
- Amirtha Nursing College
- Matha College of Teacher Education
- Seikalathur Kamatchi Amman Polytechnic College, Seikalathur, Manamadurai.
- K.L.N Polytechnic College, Muthanendhal, Manamadurai

=== Computer institutions ===
- Apollo Computer Education LTD, Gundurayar st.,
- CSC Computer Education LTD, near Ananthavalli Amman Kovil St.

=== Schools ===
- Baba Matriculation School, 1A, Mettu St.
- Baba Nursery & Primary school, 183-B, Adhanoor Road
- CSI Darling Selvabai David School for the Hearing impaired, near Gandhi silai
- CSI Govt aided High School, near Travellers Banglow
- Govt. Elementary school, Burma colony
- Good Will Matriculation School, Bye Pass Road
- Good will matriculation Higher Secondary school, M. Karisalkulam, Manamadurai
- Goodwill International Play School, near Old bus stand
- Govt. Girls Higher Secondary School, near Travellers Banglow, Anbu Nagar
- Kannar Theru Elementary School, Alagar kovil Theru
- Muthu Ameena Muslim (M.A.M) Nursery & Primary School, 113/7, Kannar Street
- O.V.C Nursery and Primary school
- O.V.C Higher Secondary School, Manamadurai
- R.C. St. Cesilia's middle school, near Old bus stand
- R.C High School, Near old bus stand
- Ralay Nursery and Primary school, Moongiloorani
- St. Mary's higher secondary school, RajaKambeeram
- Seventh Day Adventist Matriculation Higher Secondary School, Sipcot
- Seventh Day adventist Nursery and Primary School, Pappamadai, Muthanenthal post
- Venkateswara International school CBSE
- NPS Public School, Dhayapuram
- St. Joseph Nursery and primary school, Manamadurai.
- St. Joseph Matric Higher secondary School, Kilangattur, Manamadurai.
- Govt. Higher secondary school, Moongiloorani.
- Govt. High school, Melapasalai.

Manamadurai has its own Government Industrial training institute (ITI) and a Government arts & science college was proposed on the 2022 TN govt Financial Budget, and soon the location would be fixed and start the construction.

== Industrial Contributions ==
Manamadurai has its SIPCOT Industrial Complex in Seikalathur, and has a TANSIDCO Industrial Complex at Kirungakottai, a village near Muthanendhal. The Manamadurai Pottery Works is a leading pottery artisan Hub in India and owns a GI TAG for Manamadurai Pottery. The Red brick Manufacturers contribute a huge Revenue to Manamadurai's Financial growth. Many Red Brick Manufacturers in and around Manamadurai make the Manamadurai as a leading Brick Manufacturing Hub in Sivaganga district. The dried Wigs of The Thorn trees (i.e., Neltuma Juliflora) which is called as Seemai Karuvelam which covers all the empty dry, agriculture and arid lands are used for Charcoal Industries. Manamadurai has almost 4 to 5 Charcoal manufacturing hub and they are exported to abroad and throughout India Through Goods Trains from Manamadurai Junction. Thus Manamadurai is a leading industrial hub in the Sivaganga District.

== Places of Interest ==
The tourism industry is one of the major revenue generators for Manamadurai. There are various places of interest.

=== Anandavalli Samedha Somanadhaswamy Temple ===
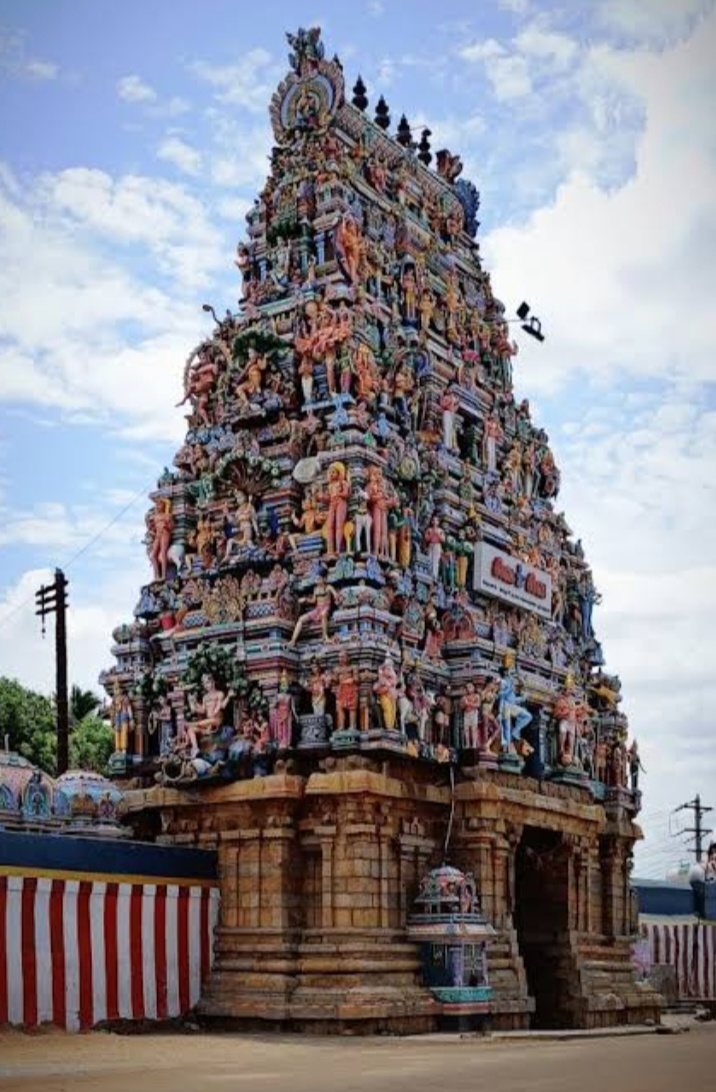
Main Gopuram of Aanandhavalli Temple

Arulmigu Somanathar temple is an ancient Shiva temple consorted with Devi Anandavalli, which also houses the Maha Samadhi of the great saint Sadasiva Brahmendra. The temple is located on the west bank of the Vaigai river. This Temple is one among the major temples supervised under the Control and Maintenance of Sivagangai Samasthan Devasthan Board

Shri Aanandhavalli Thirukalayanam festival is celebrated every year in this temple. The festival resembles the celebration done in Madurai Meenakshi amman temple. But Thirukalyanam will take place in the early morning in Madurai and late morning in Manamadurai.the Chithirai Tiruvizha takes place as similar in Madurai

=== Veera Azhagar Temple ===
The Sundara raja perumal Temple (alias) Veera Alagar Temple is built in 13th century by Pandyan feudatories and is located in the eastern banks of Vaigai, situated diagonal to the Anandhavalli Somanathar Temple. This temple houses Lord Vishnu incarnated in the form of Sundhara raja perumal along with his consort Soundharavalli Thaayār. The guardian of this temple is Lord Padhinettam padi karuppasamy. His sannidhi is at front. Whoever come to worship Azhagar, should first worship Karuppasamy. The Veera Azhagar Edhirsevai happens during the 4th day of Chithirai Thiruvizha. The Sorga Vaasal (gateway to heaven) located here is only opened once in a year During Vaikuntha Ekadesi. A wondering fact here is, The Garland made of Vada is contributed to Lord Azhagar never spoils even after a month.

=== Thayamangalam Muthumari Amman Temple ===
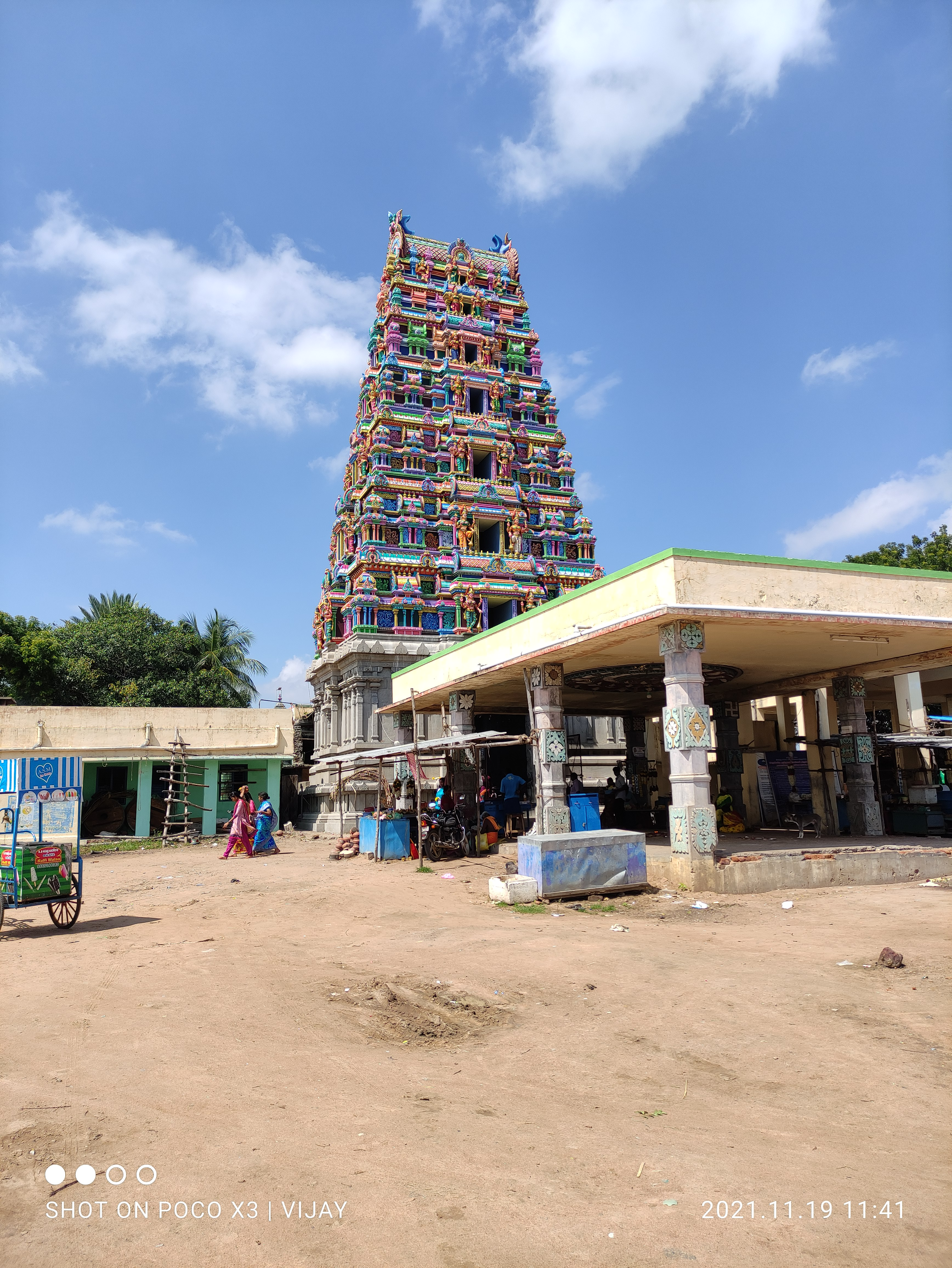
Front Gopuram of Thayamangalam Muthumaari Amman Temple

Thayamangalam is a village in Ilayayankudi Panchayat Union, Sivagangai District, Tamil Nadu.The village is situated 68 km from Madurai and 18 kilometres from Manamadurai. The famous Muthumariamman Temple is located here . The town is known as Thayamangalam because of The word Amman literally means 'Mother' or 'Thaai' in Tamil and hence called Thayamangalam. In this temple, Panguni Thiruvizha is celebrated every year from the 15th day of the Tamil month of Panguni, for 10 days. Chariot hauling (Thaerottam), Flower palanquin, and auspicious Pongal preparing ceremony are the most important event in this 10-day festival. People gather here in crowds and contribute hens and goat sheep to feed the god. People from all over India whose wishes were fulfilled by mother Muthumaari, provide contributions to god in return, donate gold and money for Annathanams, Temple Hundiyals. Special buses are arranged from Madurai, Paramakudi, Sivagangai, Manamadurai and Ramanathapuram during the festival. This Temple celebrated The Maha Kumbabishekam on 22 August 2024 after several patch works and construction of Main Gopuram.

=== Sacred Heart Shrine, Idaikattur ===
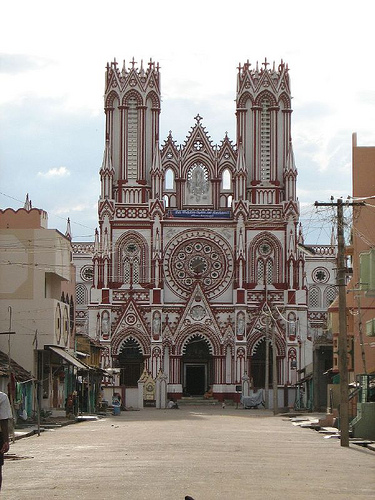

The Sacred Heart shrine is located on the outskirts of Manamadurai at a village named Idaikattur. It was built in Gothic style. It was built in 1886. It was an actual replica of Reims Cathedral, France.

=== Prithyangira Devi Temple ===
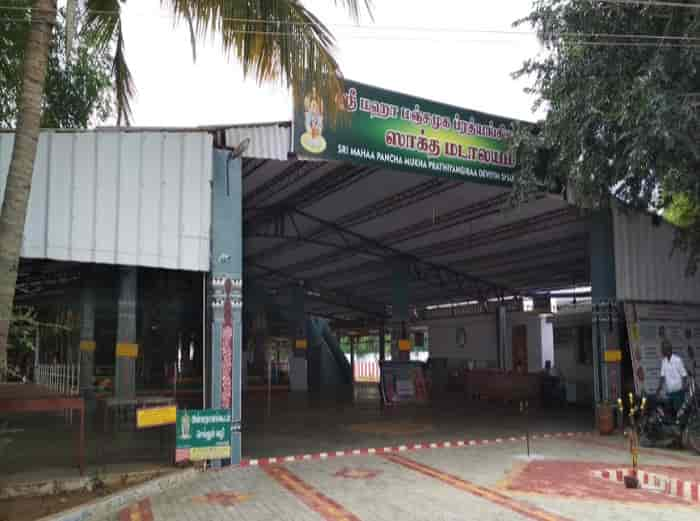
Entrance Of Prithyangira Devi Temple

Sri Maha Panchamuka Prathyangira Devi Temple located in Panchabhutheswaram, also known as Vedhiyanendal vilakku, 5 km from Manamadurai, is on old ramanathapuram road, the route in which Lord Rama went to Sri Lanka to confront Ravanan. This temple houses the 11¼ feet high statue of lord Shakthi, an incarnation of Parvati in the form of Adarvana Pathrakali alias Prathyangira Devi. This place is known for its hard cut-rock (granite) temple dedicated to Shri Maha Panchamukha Prathyangira Devi. It houses the big deity of shri Maha Panchamukha Prathyangira Devi. There are two more sannidhies for Lakshmi Ganapathi and Sornagarshna Bhairavar. Kumbhabhishekham was performed on 24 June 2010. Sahasra Sandi Maha Yagnam was also performed from 25 June 2010 to 29 June 2010. It has come in a total area of about 5.5 acres (2.2 ha). Soon within the temple premises, ten more sannidhies are going to come for Dasamaha Vidya. Non-stop annadharmam right from 2000 since inception. Every Amavasai, people were various parts of Tamil Nadu and other states visit the temple.

=== The Holy Paanch peer (Anjanamar) Five Shuhadaas Dargah ===
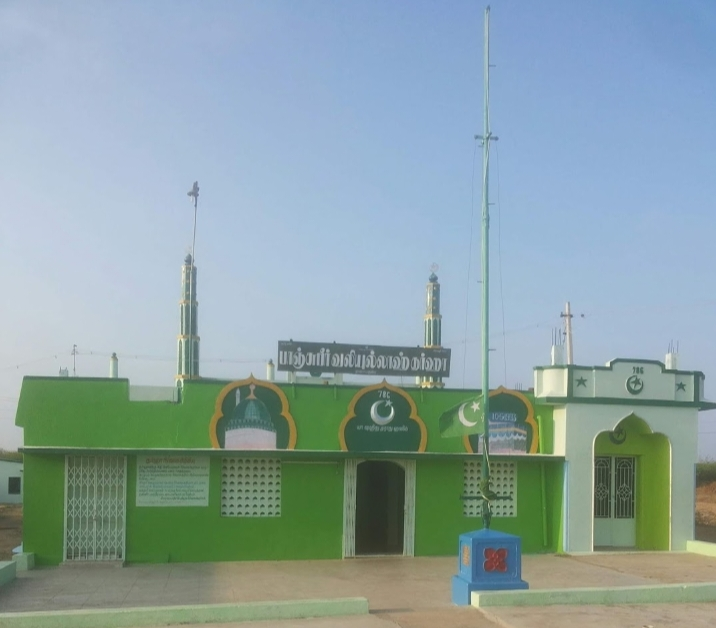

The Holy Paanch peer (Anjanamar) Five Shuhadaas Dargah is located near Kannar street, Manamadurai in Sivaganga District. The Panchpeer durgah is at Kannar road, on the Manamadurai-Ilayangudi State Highway. The Graves of Five Martyrs who came with Badusha Sulthan Syed Ibrahim Shaheed of Ervadi is found here.

=== Thallakulam Muneeswarar Temple ===
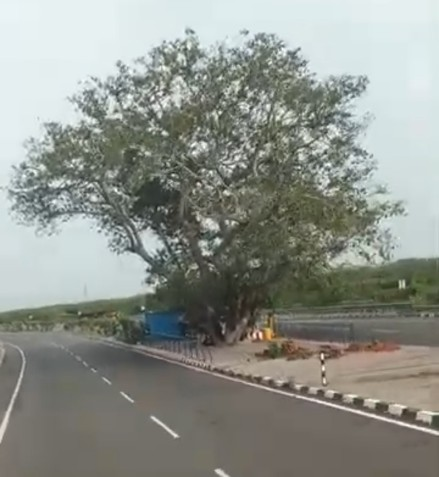
Thallakulam Muneeswarar temple

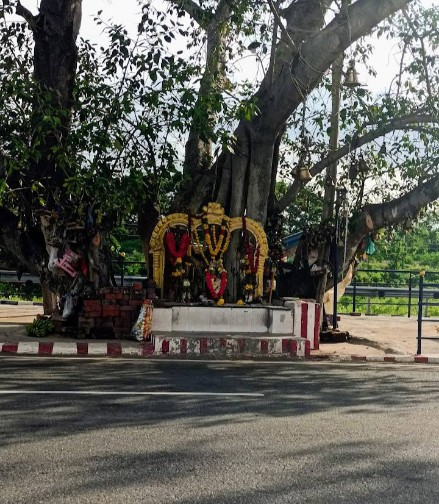
Thallakulam Muneeswarar temple

This temple is situated in the middle of the two lanes of NH49 (Cochin-Dhanushkodi Highway) near Manamadurai By-pass. This temple takes its place under the shade of a huge 200 year old peepal tree. This temple entered into a highly controversial topic during the Expansion of two lane road into a fourway road. For the road extension, the Peepal tree was a great disturbance. So, NHAI officials ordered to cut the tree. A worker with an electric saw, approached the tree. Once, he started cutting, he started coughing with vomiting blood, and was sent to hospital. He was said to be died on the way. From that incident, the workers dropped down the idea of cutting it. NHAI sent another worker to cut the tree. The people say that the worker too lost his life in an accident. Due to such coincided deaths, NHAI dropped the idea of cutting the peepal tree and laid road leaving the temple in middle, undisturbed. The story has become an urban legend, with people firmly believing in the eternal presence of a god at the peepal tree. Finally the fate played its part. On 1 April 2025, The Peepal tree collapsed and withered on the Highway pavement. It was found that the tree was far old and died naturally which left all the residents of Manamadurai in tears.

=== Perilla Maram Tharma Muneeswarar Temple ===
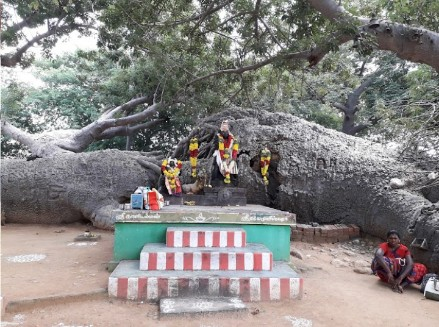
Perilla Maram Tharma Muneeswarar temple

This temple is situated in the outskirts of Manamadurai in a village named Nedunkulam that comes under Keelapasalai Panchayat. It houses the infamous African Baobab tree which is rare in this region. It was very old and had fallen due to a strong breeze once a few decades ago. The tree was named "Perilla Maram" (transl:Nameless tree) by the local people as it doesn't look like any of the local species. Many botanical Researchers frequently visited the tree, and clarrified to the local people that, this ain't unlisted or unfounded species. Its African Baobab tree which is widespread found in Ramanathapuram. It could have grown here by someone who took the sapling from there and planted it here. But still, all the localites call this tree as Unnamed tree.

=== Parthibanur Dam ===
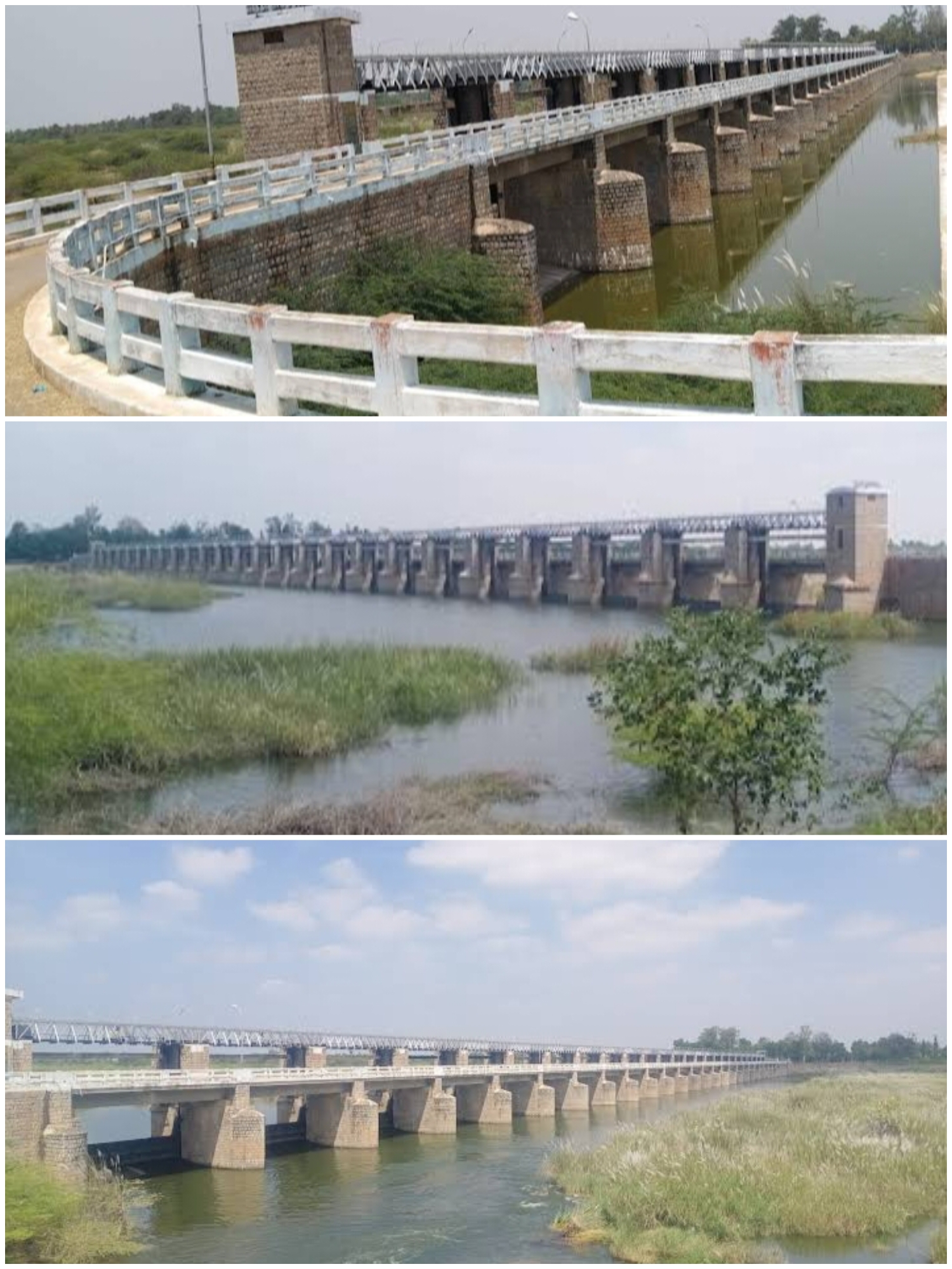
Parthibanur Dam

This dam was built across Vaigai River, located near Vediyanendhal in a village called Enathikottai which comes under Parthibanur panchayat of Ramanathapuram district but it is nearest to Manamadurai. And hence, treated as a tourist spot of Manamadurai. The annual tourist visit had a massive increase in recent years. It has 25 shutters, which is unde control and maintenance of Ramanathapuram Public works department. It becomes usually crowded whenever Tamil Nadu Government opens Vaigai River for Periodic irrigation. It seems to be best spot for photography and swimming.

=== Panickanendhal Barrage Dam ===
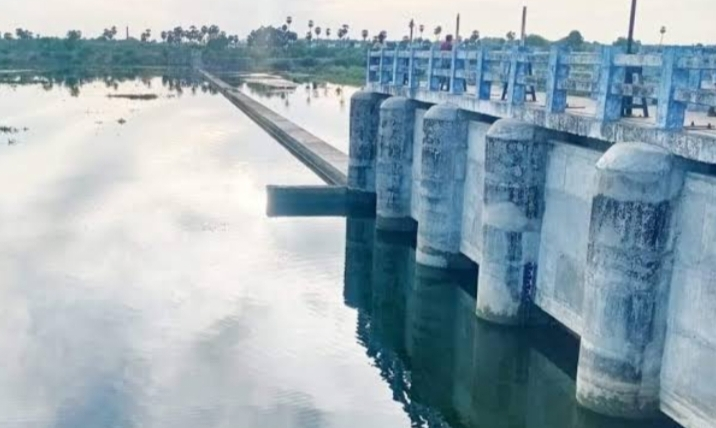
Panickanendhal bed dam

This barrage dam was also built across Vaigai River but comes under the Sivaganga district. It is located in Aathanoor Village of Keelapasalai Panchayat. Whenever Tamil Nadu Government opens the Vaigai River for Periodic irrigation, the dam becomes well sourced for tourists and the local people who take bath and swim in the river.

== Also see this ==
- Manamadurai block
- Manamadurai taluk
- Manamadurai Assembly
- Manamadurai Railway Junction
- Madurai
