= Fifth Jayalalithaa ministry =

Government of Tamil Nadu, India (2015–2016)

- 17th Ministry of Tamil Nadu

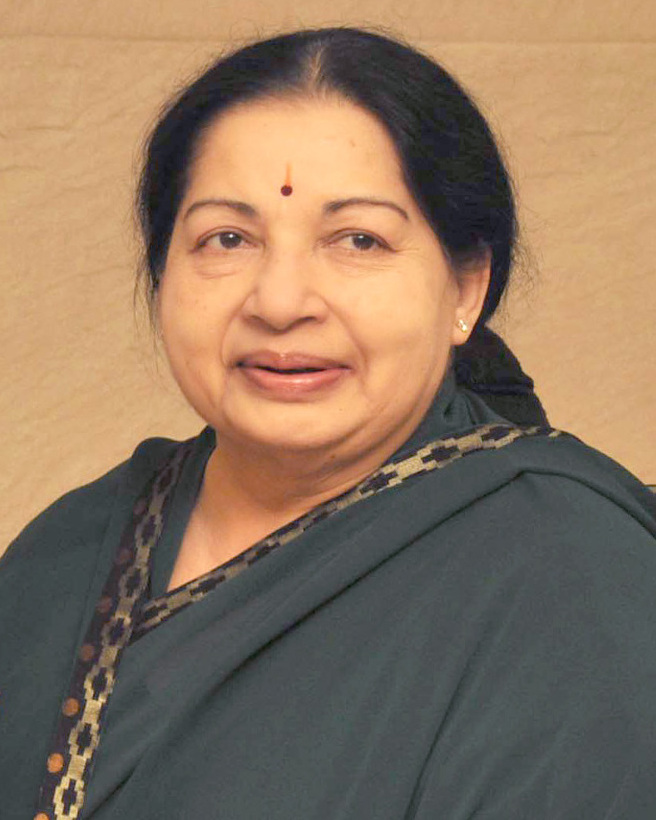
- J. Jayalalithaa
- Date formed: 23 May 2015
- Date dissolved: 22 May 2016

People and organisations
- Head of state: Governor Konijeti Rosaiah
- Head of government: J. Jayalalithaa
- Member parties: AIADMK
- Status in legislature: Majority
- Opposition party: DMDK
- Opposition leader: Vijayakanth

History
- Election: 2011
- Legislature term: 5 Years
- Predecessor: Second Panneerselvam ministry
- Successor: Sixth Jayalalithaa ministry

J. Jayalalithaa was sworn in as Chief Minister of Tamil Nadu on 23 May 2015. Earlier Jayalalithaa was charged of Rs 66.66 crore disproportionate assets case and forced to resign in the year 2014. O. Panneerselvam her trusted aide assumed the office then resigned after her return in 2015.

== Cabinet ministers ==
| S.no | Name | Constituency | Designation | Portfolios | Party |
|---|---|---|---|---|---|
Chief Minister
| 1. | J. Jayalalithaa | Radhakrishnan Nagar | Chief Minister | Public; Home; Police; Indian Administrative Service; Indian Police Service; Indian Forest Service; District Revenue Officers; General Administration | AIADMK |
Cabinet Ministers
| 2. | O. Panneerselvam | Bodinayakkanur | Minister for Finance | Finance | AIADMK |
| 3. | Natham R. Viswanathan | Natham | Minister for Electricity, Prohibition and Excise | Electricity; Non-Conventional Energy Development; Prohibition and Excise; Molasses and Prevention of Corruption Act | AIADMK |
| 4. | Edappadi Palaniswami | Edappadi | Minister for Highways and Minor Ports | Highways; Minor Ports; Forests | AIADMK |
| 5. | Sellur K. Raju | Madurai West | Minister for Co-operation | Co-operation | AIADMK |
| 6. | S. P. Velumani | Thondamuthur | Minister for Municipal Administration, Rural Development and Implementation of Special Programme | Municipal Administration; Rural Development; Panchayats and Panchayat Unions; Poverty Alleviation Programmes; Rural Indebtedness; Urban and Rural Water Supply; Implementation of Special Programme | AIADMK |
| 7. | K.A. Jayapal | Nagapattinam | Minister for Fisheries | Fisheries and Fisheries Development Corporation | AIADMK |
| 8. | P. Palaniappan | Pappireddipatti | Minister for Higher Education | Higher Education | AIADMK |
| 9. | B. Valarmathi | Thousand Lights | Minister for Social Welfare and Nutritious Noon Meal Programme | Social Welfare including Women's and Children's Welfare; Orphanages and Correctional Administration; Integrated Child Development and Beggar Homes; Welfare of the Differently Abled and Social Reforms; Nutritious Noon Meal Programme | AIADMK |
| 10. | P. Thangamani | Kumarapalayam | Minister for Industries | Industries; Steel Control; Mines and Minerals | AIADMK |
| 11. | N. D. Venkatachalam | Perundurai | Minister for Environment | Environment; Pollution Control | AIADMK |
| 12. | R. Kamaraj | Krishnarayapuram | Minister for Food and Civil Supplies | Food; Civil Supplies; Consumer Protection and Price Control | AIADMK |
| 13. | S. Gokula Indira | Anna Nagar | Minister for Handlooms and Textiles | Handlooms and Textiles | AIADMK |
| 14. | R. Vaithilingam | Orathanadu | Minister for Housing and Urban Development | Housing; Rural Housing and Housing Development; Slum Clearance Board and Accommodation Control; Town Planning; Urban Development; Chennai Metropolitan Development Authority | AIADMK |
| 15. | Dr. C. Vijayabaskar | Viralimalai | Minister for Health | Health; Medical Education; Family Welfare | AIADMK |
| 16. | K.T. Rajenthra Bhalaji | Sivakasi | Minister for Information and Special Programme Implementation | Information and Publicity; Special Programme Implementation | AIADMK |
| 17. | R. B. Udhayakumar | Sattur | Minister for Revenue | Revenue; District Revenue Establishment; Deputy Collectors | AIADMK |
| 18. | B. V. Ramanaa | Thiruvallur | Minister for Milk and Dairy Development | Milk and Dairy Development | AIADMK |
| 19. | S.P. Shunmuganathan | Srivaikuntam | Minister for Tourism | Tourism; Tourism Development Corporation | AIADMK |
| 20. | M.C. Sampath | Cuddalore | Minister for Commercial Taxes and Registration | Commercial Taxes; Registration and Stamp Act | AIADMK |
| 21. | P. Mohan | Sankarapuram | Minister for Rural Industries and Labour | Rural Industries; Labour | AIADMK |
| 22. | K.C. Veeramani | Jolarpet | Minister for School Education | School Education | AIADMK |
| 23. | V. Senthil Balaji | Karur | Minister for Transport | Transport; Nationalised Transport and Motor Vehicles Act | AIADMK |
| 24. | Mukkur N. Subramanian | Cheyyar | Minister for Information Technology | Information Technology | AIADMK |
| 25. | N. Subramanian | Gandharvakottai | Minister for Adi Dravidar and Tribal Welfare | Adi Dravidar Welfare; Hill Tribes | AIADMK |
| 26. | S. Abdul Rahim | Avadi | Minister for Backward Classes and Minorities Welfare | Backward Classes and Most Backward Classes and Denotified Communities | AIADMK |
| 27. | T.K.M. Chinnayya | Tambaram | Minister for Animal Husbandry | Animal Husbandry | AIADMK |
| 28. | T. P. Poonachi | Manachanallur | Minister for Khadi and Village Industries | Khadi; Village Industries | AIADMK |

== Achievements ==
In 2015, The Government introduced Amma Master Health checkup plan where in people could get various treatments done at a low fee in government hospitals and rolled out Amma Arogya plan wherein at primary health care centre in Tamil Nadu, certain tests can be done by public twice a week. This was done to help the sections of society who cannot afford the fares asked for by private hospital. Later in February 2016, The Government started the free bus ride scheme for senior citizens above age of 60 wherein person could travel free of cost for 10 times a month. The Government initiated Global Investors Summit in 2015 which saw over Rs 2.43 lakh crore worth of investments being committed to the state. Jayalalithaa's term, all of them together, saw some big-ticket investments in the state and over $20 billion FDI. The department of industrial policy and promotion data disclosed that Tamil Nadu saw foreign direct investment inflows of $7.3 billion from April 2000 to March 2011; however, this went up to $13.94 billion from April 2011 to December 2015, under Jayalalithaa government, which at as per conversion rate as of 2016 equals Rs 83,766 crore. Between April 2015 and December 2015, the State attracted $4.3 billion in FDI.

In June 2015, Pakistani news channels Samaa TV and Geo News aired a news and applauded Jayalalithaa for her government's scheme which was introduced in 2013, of supplying free rice to mosques during Ramzan and suggested the scheme should be implemented in Pakistan too. On 20 February 2016, Jayalalithaa led AIADMK Government passed the Tamil Nadu Municipal Laws (Amendment) Act, 2016, and the Tamil Nadu Panchayats (Amendment) Act, 2016 in Tamil Nadu Assembly, enhancing the reservation for women from 33 per cent to 50 per cent in local bodies such as corporations, municipalities, town panchayats and village panchayats in the state.
