= Fourth Jayalalithaa ministry =

Government of Tamil Nadu, India from 2011 to 2014

- 15th Ministry of Tamil Nadu

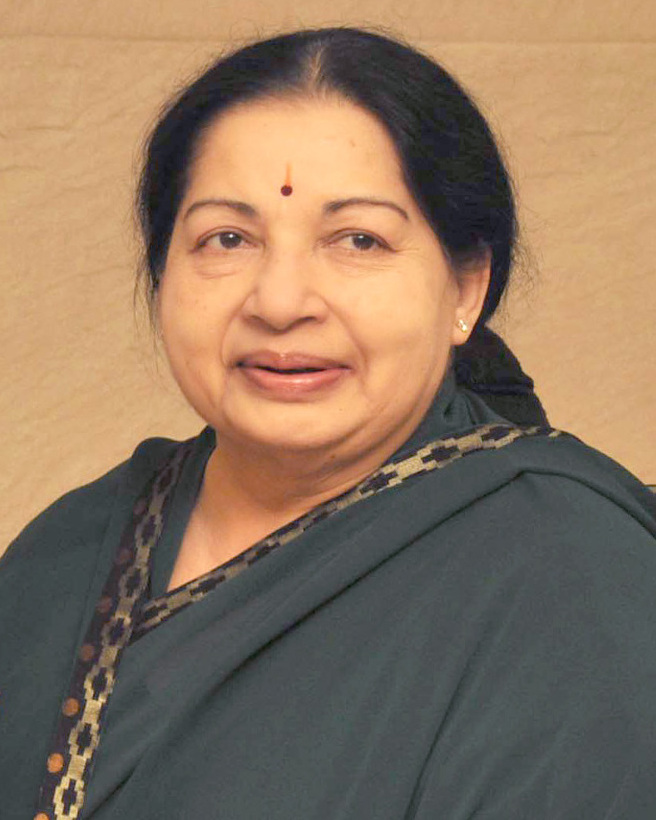
- J. Jayalalithaa
- Date formed: 16 May 2011
- Date dissolved: 27 September 2014

People and organisations
- Head of state: Governor Surjit Singh Barnala
- Head of government: J. Jayalalithaa
- Member parties: AIADMK
- Status in legislature: Majority
- Opposition party: DMDK
- Opposition leader: Vijayakanth

History
- Incoming formation: 14th Tamil Nadu Assembly
- Outgoing formation: 13th Tamil Nadu Assembly
- Election: 2011
- Outgoing election: 2006
- Legislature term: 5 Years
- Predecessor: Fifth Karunanidhi ministry
- Successor: Second Panneerselvam ministry

The Fourteenth legislative assembly election was held on 13 April 2011 to elect members from 234 constituencies in Tamil Nadu. Results were released on 13 May 2011. Two major parties Dravida Munnetra Kazhagam (DMK) and All India Anna Dravida Munnetra Kazhagam (AIADMK) faced the election as coalitions of multiple parties with the DMK front consisting of 8 parties and the AIADMK of 11 parties. AIADMK front won the election, winning in 203 constituencies, with the AIADMK party itself winning 150 seats thus securing a simple majority to be able to form the government without the support of its coalition partners.

== Cabinet ministers ==
S.no	Name	Constituency	Designation	Portfolios	Party
Chief Minister
1.	J. Jayalalithaa	Srirangam	Chief Minister	Public; Home; Police; Indian Administrative Service; Indian Police Service; Indian Forest Service; District Revenue Officers; General Administration	AIADMK
Cabinet Ministers
2.	O. Panneerselvam	Bodinayakkanur	Minister for Finance	Finance; Planning; Legislative Assembly; Elections; Passports	AIADMK
3.	Edappadi Palaniswami	Edappadi	Minister for Highways and Minor Ports	Highways; Minor Ports	AIADMK
4.	Sellur K. Raju	Madurai West	Minister for Co-operation	Co-operation; Statistics; Ex-Servicemen Welfare	AIADMK
5.	Natham R. Viswanathan	Natham	Minister for Electricity, Prohibition and Excise	Electricity; Non-Conventional Energy Development; Prohibition and Excise; Molasses	AIADMK
6.	K. P. Munusamy	Krishnagiri	Minister for Municipal Administration, Rural Development and Implementation of Special Programme	Municipal Administration; Rural Development; Panchayats and Panchayat Unions; Poverty Alleviation Programmes; Rural Indebtedness; Urban and Rural Water Supply	AIADMK
7.	K.A. Jayapal	Nagapattinam	Minister for Fisheries	Fisheries and Fisheries Development Corporation	AIADMK
8.	P. Palaniappan	Pappireddipatti	Minister for Higher Education	Higher Education; including Technical Education: Electronics; Science and Technology	AIADMK
9.	B. Valarmathi	Thousand Lights	Minister for Social Welfare and Nutritious Noon Meal Programme	Social Welfare including Women's and Children's Welfare; Orphanages and Correctional Administration; Integrated Child Development and Beggar Homes; Welfare of the Differently Abled and Social Reforms; Nutritious Noon Meal Programme	AIADMK
10.	P. Thangamani	Kumarapalayam	Minister for Industries	Industries; Steel Control; Mines and Minerals	AIADMK
11.	N. D. Venkatachalam	Perundurai	Minister for Revenue	Revenue; District Revenue Establishment; Deputy Collectors; Weights and Measures; Debt Relief including legislation on Money lending; Chits; Registration of Companies	AIADMK
12.	R. Kamaraj	Nannilam	Minister for Food and Civil Supplies	Food; Civil Supplies; Consumer Protection and Price Control	AIADMK
13.	S. Sundararaj	Paramakudi	Minister for Handlooms and Textiles	Handlooms and Textiles	AIADMK
14.	S. Gokula Indira	Anna Nagar	Minister for Tourism	Tourism; Tourism Development Corporation	AIADMK
15.	R. Vaithilingam	Orathanadu	Minister for Housing and Urban Development	Housing; Rural Housing and Housing Development; Slum Clearance Board and Accommodation Control; Town Planning; Urban Development; Chennai Metropolitan Development Authority	AIADMK
16.	V. S. Vijay	Vellore	Minister for Health	Health; Medical Education; Family Welfare	AIADMK
17.	K.T. Rajenthra Bhalaji	Sivakasi	Minister for Information and Special Programme Implementation	Information and Publicity; Special Programme Implementation including implementation of the Election manifesto; Film Technology and Cinematograph Act; Stationery and Printing and Government Press	AIADMK
18.	V. Moorthy	Madavaram	Minister for Milk and Dairy Development	Milk and Dairy Development	AIADMK
19.	B. V. Ramanaa	Thiruvallur	Minister for Commercial Taxes and Registration	Commercial Taxes; Registration; Stamp Act	AIADMK
20.	M.C. Sampath	Cuddalore	Minister for Environment	Environment; Pollution Control	AIADMK
21.	P. Mohan	Sankarapuram	Minister for Rural Industries	Rural Industries including Cottage Industries and Small Industries	AIADMK
22.	N. R. Sivapathi	Musiri	Minister for School Education and Sports and Youth Welfare, Law, Courts and Prisons	School Education; Archaeology; Sports and Youth Welfare; Tamil Official Language and Tamil; Culture; Law; Courts and Prisons; Personnel and Administrative Reforms * Prevention of Corruption	AIADMK
23.	V. Senthil Balaji	Karur	Minister for Transport	Transport; Nationalised Transport; Motor Vehicles Act	AIADMK
24.	Mukkur N. Subramanian	Cheyyar	Minister for Information Technology	Information Technology	AIADMK
25.	N. Subramanian	Gandharvakottai	Minister for Adi Dravidar and Tribal Welfare	Adi Dravidar Welfare; Hill Tribes; Bonded Labour	AIADMK
26.	A. Mohammed John	Ranipet	Minister for Backward Classes and Minorities Welfare	Backward Classes; Most Backward Classes and Denotified * Communities; Overseas Indians; Refugees & Evacuees; Minorities Welfare including Wakf	AIADMK
27.	T.K.M. Chinnayya	Tambaram	Minister for Animal Husbandry	Animal Husbandry	AIADMK
28.	S. Damodaran	Kinathukadavu	Minister for Agriculture	Agriculture; Agricultural Engineering; Agro Service Cooperatives; Horticulture; Sugarcane Cess; Sugarcane Development and Waste Land Development	AIADMK
29.	K. T. Pachaimal	Kanyakumari	Minister for Forests	Forests and Cinchona	AIADMK
30.	K. V. Ramalingam	Erode (West)	Minister for Public Works	Public Works; Irrigation including Minor Irrigation; Programme Works	AIADMK
31.	S. T. Chellapandian	Thoothukkudi	Minister for Labour	Labour; Population; Employment and Training; Newsprint Control; Census; Urban and Rural Employment	AIADMK
32.	M. S. M. Anandan	Tiruppur (North)	Minister for Hindu Religious and Charitable Endowments	Hindu Religious and Charitable Endowments	AIADMK
33.	P. Chendur Pandian	Kadayanallur	Minister for Khadi and Village Industries	Khadi; Village Industries	AIADMK

== Swearing-in ==
Jayalalitha submitted her unanimous election as the leader of ADMK legislature party to Governor Surjit Singh Barnala on 15 May 2011. She was sworn-in as Chief Minister along with 33 other ministers at the Madras University centenary auditorium on 16 May 2011 by the Governor, the same venue she took oath in 1991 when she first became chief minister. She and all other ministers took oath in Tamil. The ceremony was attended by then Gujarat Chief Minister Narendra Modi, former Andhra Pradesh Chief Minister N. Chandrababu Naidu, Communist Party of India (CPI) General Secretary A. B. Bardhan and Rashtriya Lok Dal Chief Ajit Singh among others.

== Achievements ==
=== Relocation of assembly building ===
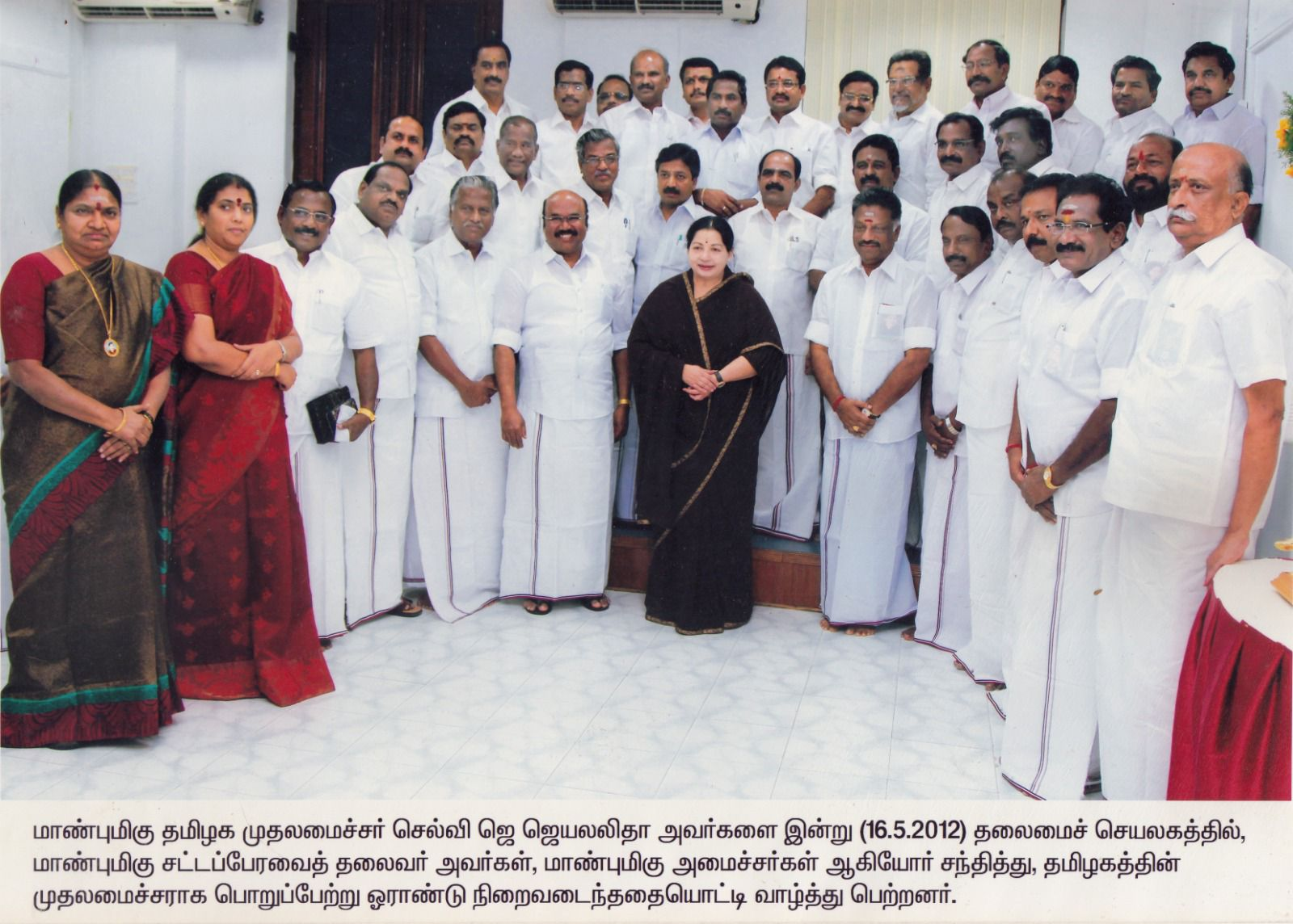
Jayalalithaa along with her council of ministers during the occasion of the completion of one year in office after 2011 victory

In one of the first actions following her re-election as the Chief Minister of Tamil Nadu, Jayalaitha proceeded to relocate the assembly and secretariat from the newly constructed building back to Fort St. George. The assembly building was constructed during M. Karunanidhi's tenure and costed over 1000 crores of rupees. This move was opposed by Pattali Makkal Katchi, Marumalarchi Dravida Munnetra Kazhagam and Dravidar Kazhagam. A public interest litigation has been filed in Chennai high court by lawyer G. Krishnamoorthy alleging that the relocation was against public interest and unmindful of the large amount of tax money used for the construction of the new building.

=== Amma Unavagam ===
In February 2013, Jayalalithaa Government inaugurated the state-run Subsidised food programme called Amma Unavagam (Amma Canteen), which was later praised by economist and Nobel laureate Amartya Sen in his book An Uncertain Glory – India and its Contradictions and inspired by many states in India. The Scheme was also lauded by Egypt in 2014. Under the scheme, municipal corporations of the state-run canteens serving subsidised food at low prices.

=== Amma Branded Schemes ===
The plenty of populist schemes such as Amma Kudineer (bottled mineral water), 'Amma' Salt, 'Amma' Medical Shops, and 'Amma' Cement were also implemented.

In 2015, The Government launched 'Amma baby care kit' scheme where every mother who gave birth in the government hospital gets 16 types of products.

=== Tamizhaga arasu madikanini thittam ===
Tamizhaga arasu madikanini thittam is a scheme in Tamil Nadu to distribute free laptops to students of secondary schools and colleges. The scheme was implemented beginning in September 2011 to fulfill a campaign promise of Chief Minister Jayalalithaa of the AIADMK.

Content	Specification
Processor	Intel Pentium dual-core processor
Operating system	Windows 7 & Linux BOSS 4.0
Size	14-inch display
Weight	2.7 kg
Physical memory	2 GB RAM
HDD	320 GB
Warranty	One year

=== Other Achievements ===
The Government also announced the Pension Scheme for Destitute Transgender by which those above ages of 40 could get a monthly pension of Rs.1,000. Jayalalithaa government ensured members of the transgender community could enrol for education and job. Beginning from 2011, every year Jayalalithaa government gave free laptops to students who clear tenth and twelfth standard to impart digital education to rural areas. The government in 2011 decided to give four goats and a cow to each family below poverty line — mixer and grinders and fans for households, 3 sets of free uniforms, school, bags, notebooks, geometry boxes for all children in government schools, and cycles and laptops for Class 11 and 12 students. In 2011 It launched the marriage assistance scheme wherein the female students received 4 gram gold free for use as Thirumangalyam for their marriage and cash assistance up to Rs.50,000 for undergraduate or diploma holding females. There were rampant power cut issues between 2006 and 2011 while AIADMK was in opposition wherein for 10 to 15 hours there was no supply of electricity. However, after Jayalalithaa regained power, between 2011 and 2015, The state government corrected all the discrepancies of previous DMK regime such that the Central Electricity Authority in 2016 said the state is expected to have 11,649 million units of surplus power. Tamil Nadu became among the power surplus states while Jayalalithaa was chief minister in this term. In the government ensured the wrongfully usurped property by land grabbing during 2006 to 2011 in the previous DMK regime, had been retrieved and handed over to rightful owners between 2011 and 2015.

Jayalalithaa Government announced in 2012, the Vision 2023 document which embodied a strategic plan for infrastructure development which included raising the per capita income of residents to $10,000 per annum, matching Human Development Index to that of developed countries by 2023, providing high-quality infrastructure all over the State, making Tamil Nadu the knowledge capital and innovation hub of India. This project had three components — Overall Vision Document, Compilation of Project Profile and Road Map. The work on this continued under her supervision until her death. She inaugurated 'Amma health insurance scheme' in 2012.

== Demographics ==
Ministers by district (Note: Based on the location of the assembly constituency from which the corresponding member was elected from.)
#	District	Ministers	Name
1	Ariyalur	0	
2	Chengalpattu	1	T. K. M. Chinnayya
3	Chennai	3	B. Valarmathi; S. Gokula Indira; V. Moorthy
4	Coimbatore	1	S. Damodaran
5	Cuddalore	1	M. C. Sampath
6	Dharmapuri	1	P. Palaniappan
7	Dindigul	1	Natham R. Viswanathan
8	Erode	2	K. V. Ramalingam; N. D. Venkatachalam
9	Kallakurichi	1	P. Mohan
10	Kancheepuram	0	
11	Kanniyakumari	1	K. T. Pachaimal
12	Karur	1	V. Senthil Balaji
13	Krishnagiri	1	K. P. Munusamy
14	Madurai	1	Sellur K. Raju
15	Mayiladuthurai	0	
16	Nagapattinam	1	K. A. Jayapal
17	Namakkal	1	P. Thangamani
18	Nilgiris	0	
19	Perambalur	0	
20	Pudukkottai	1	N. Subramanian
21	Ramanathapuram	1	S. Sundararaj
22	Ranipet	1	A. Mohammed John
23	Salem	1	Edappadi Palaniswami
24	Sivaganga	0	
25	Tenkasi	1	P. Chendur Pandian
26	Thanjavur	1	R. Vaithilingam
27	Theni	1	O. Panneerselvam
28	Tiruvallur	1	B. V. Ramanaa
29	Thiruvarur	1	R. Kamaraj
30	Thoothukudi	1	S. T. Chellapandian
31	Tiruchirappalli	2	J. Jayalalithaa; N. R. Sivapathi
32	Tirunelveli	0	
33	Tirupattur	0	
34	Tiruppur	1	M. S. M. Anandan
35	Tiruvannamalai	1	Mukkur N. Subramanian
36	Vellore	1	V. S. Vijay
37	Viluppuram	0	
38	Virudhunagar	1	K. T. Rajenthra Bhalaji
