= R. Chidambara Bharathi =

- Born: Rengasamy Chidambara Bharathi; 5 June 1905; Madurai, British India
- Died: 30 April 1987 (aged 81)
- Occupation: nationalist
- Spouse: Pichai Ammal
- Children: 1 daughter

Rengasamy Chidambara Bharathi (5 June 1905 – 30 April 1987) was a freedom fighter and nationalist who spent 14 years in various prisons in northern India. He was also former Member of the Legislative Assembly of Tamil Nadu.

He was arrested several times by then British police and tried by then British law. After independence he participated in national politics and was a close friend of K. Kamaraj. He was elected to the Tamil Nadu legislative assembly as an Indian National Congress candidate from Manamadurai constituency in 1957 election. After the split in Congress, he joined Syndicate Congress led by Nijalingappa. He received Tamira Patra, the highest honour given to a freedom fighter in India. He died on 30 April 1987.

== Early life ==
R. Chidambara Bharathi was born on 5 June 1905, as sixteenth son of Rengasamy Servai and Ponnammal at their Ramayana Chavadi residence in North Masi Street, Madurai. He had eight elder brothers and seven elder sisters. When he was five years old his father died, and his old mother took care of him. He had to stop his studies due to his poverty. He was attracted by Subramnya Siva, a revolutionary freedom fighter. He spent two years in Siva's Papparaptti Ashram and grew as a nationalist with progressive thoughts.

== Freedom struggle ==
Bharathi joined the left-wing congress led by Lokamanya Tilak. He was declared wanted by British police on many cases filed by the British police, particularly in the acid blast case, in which he threw acid pots on the then Superintendent of Police of Madurai district, Theechatti Govindan Nayar. He spent a total of 14 years in many North Indian prisons. After his release, he married cousin, Pitchai Ammal. They had a daughter.

== Political life ==
After independence, He was elected as a member of All India Congress Committee and served for two years. He contested the state Assembly elections in Tamil Nadu in 1956 from Manamadurai Constituency and got elected and served the full five-year tenure.

== Awards ==
Bharathi was a recipient of many awards, including the Tamira Patara award from the then Prime minister Indira Gandhi, the highest Award given to an Indian freedom fighter.

He served as the President of Tamil Nadu Freedom fighters Association until his death.

He died at the age of 82 on 30 April 1987 at his home in Arappalayam. He was survived by his daughter.
