= P. Duraipandi =

Indian politician

Periyampillai Duraipandi was an Indian politician and former Member of the Legislative Assembly of Tamil Nadu.

== Early and personal life ==
Duraipandi was born to a poor family, consisting of a railman, Periyampillai, and a housewife, Rakku, in a Mazhavarayanendhal village in Sivaganga district. He was educated in government school. Between caste differences in Indian society, he hailed as a successful doctor from Thanjavur Medical College, emerging as a successful politician in Manamadurai constituency. He is married to A. Manonmani, who was the chairman of Tiruppuvanam Panchayath. He has a son and a daughter, who are also doctors.

== Political career ==
He was elected to the Tamil Nadu legislative assembly as a Dravida Munnetra Kazhagam candidate from Manamadurai constituency in the election of 1989. He was the first to establish a bus service for his village, Mazhavarayenthal. He was the only DMK candidate to be elected in Manamadurai since 1989.
