= K. Alaguvelu =

Indian politician

K. Alaguvelu is an Indian politician and was a member of the 14th Tamil Nadu Legislative Assembly from the Kallakurichi constituency, which is reserved for Scheduled Castes. She represented the All India Anna Dravida Munnetra Kazhagam party.

The elections of 2016 resulted in her constituency being won by A. Prabhu.
