= Krishnaswami Iyengar =

Indian politician

Krishnaswami Iyengar was an Indian politician and former Member of the Legislative Assembly of Tamil Nadu. He was elected to the Tamil Nadu Legislative Assembly as an Indian National Congress candidate from Manamadurai constituency in the 1952 election.
