= Vaigai Reservoir =

Coordinates: 9.89776°N 78.176157°E

The Vaigai Reservoir, often known as the Viraganoor Barrage Dam, is a major barrage dam constructed across the River Vaigai in Puliyankulam village of Silaiman Panchayat.

The dam is 10 km from Madurai city, between Madurai and Sivagangai on the bye-pass road of Rameshwaram National Highway 49. The dam is commonly referred to as Viraganoor Dam because is sited by the village of Viraganoor. The dam is under the maintenance of Tamil Nadu Public Works Department (PWD). A small park is also maintained near the dam. It supplies drinking water to Madurai.

The main purpose of the dam is to use the water for irrigation purpose for the areas around the dam. It caters to the crops in Madurai, Vadipatti and Madurai North, Thirupathur and Sivaganga in Sivaganga and Nilakottai in Dindigul.

It functions as a major dam for closing and diverting the river water through drainages for irrigation purposes. This dam plays a key role in the Vaigai - Kirudhumal joint venture irrigation project.
