= Fifth Karunanidhi ministry =

Government of Tamil Nadu, India (2006–2011)

- 14th Ministry of Tamil Nadu

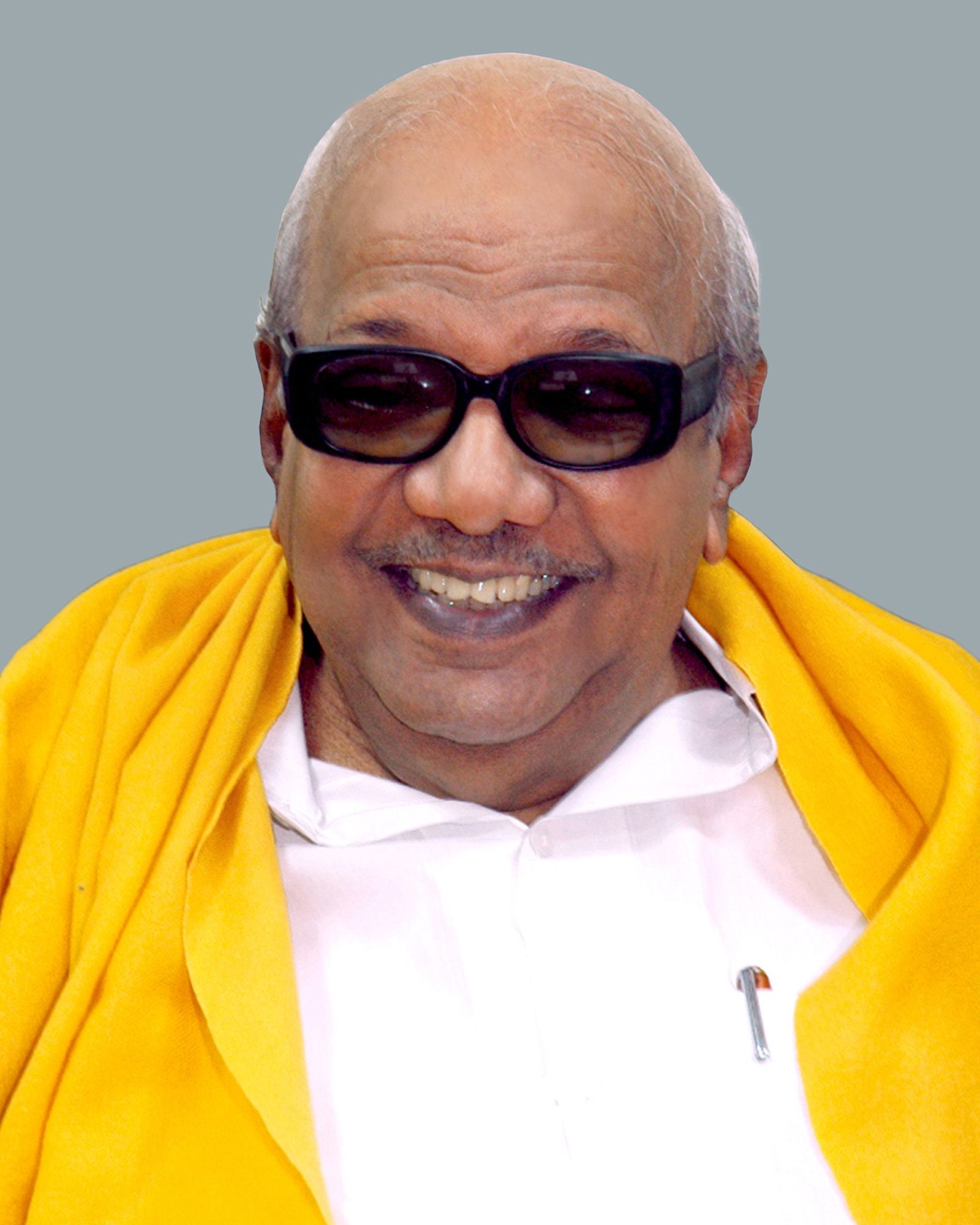
- M. Karunanidhi
- Date formed: 13 May 2006
- Date dissolved: 15 May 2011

People and organisations
- Head of state: Governor Surjit Singh Barnala
- Head of government: M. Karunanidhi
- Member parties: DMK
- Status in legislature: Minority
- Opposition party: AIADMK
- Opposition leader: J. Jayalalithaa

History
- Incoming formation: 13th Tamil Nadu Assembly
- Outgoing formation: 12th Tamil Nadu Assembly
- Election: 2006
- Legislature term: 5 Years
- Predecessor: Third Jayalalithaa ministry
- Successor: Fourth Jayalalithaa ministry

M. Karunanidhi was sworn in as Chief Minister of Tamil Nadu on for fifth time after DMK and allies' victory in the 2006 state assembly election, forming the first minority government in the state since the 1952 election. M. Karunanidhi became the 14th Chief Minister of Tamil Nadu due to the election.

== Cabinet ministers ==
S.no	Name	Designation	Portfolios	Party
Chief Minister
1.	M. Karunanidhi	Chief Minister	Public; Home; Police; Indian Administrative Service; Indian Police Service; Indian Forest Service; Prevention of Corruption; Prohibition and Excise; Molasses; Tamil Official Language and Tamil Culture	DMK
Deputy Chief Minister (Since 2009)
3.	M. K. Stalin	Deputy Chief Minister	General Administration; District Revenue Officers; Industries; Minorities Welfare; Passports; Special Initiatives; Social Reforms; Municipal Administration; Rural Development; Panchayats and Panchayat Union; Poverty Alleviation Programmes; Rural Indebtedness; Urban and Rural Water Supply	DMK
Cabinet Ministers
2.	Prof. K. Anbazhagan	Minister for Finance	Finance; Planning; Legislative Assembly and Elections	DMK
4.	Arcot N. Veeraswami	Minister for Electricity	Electricity; Non-Conventional Energy Development *Personnel and Administrative Reforms	DMK
5.	Ko.Si. Mani	Minister for Co-operation	Co-operation; Statistics; Welfare of Ex-Servicemen	DMK
6.	Veerapandi S. Arumugam	Minister for Agriculture	Agriculture *Agricultural Engineering; Agro Service Co-operatives *Horticulture; Sugarcane Cess; Sugarcane Development; Wasteland Development	DMK
7.	Duraimurugan	Minister for Public Works and Law	Public Works; Irrigation including Minor Irrigation *Programme Works; Law and Courts	DMK
8.	Dr. K. Ponmudy	Minister for Higher Education	Higher Education including Technical *Education; Electronics; Science and Technology; Mines and Minerals	DMK
9.	K. N. Nehru	Minister for Transport	Transport; Nationalized Transport; Motor Vehicles Act.	DMK
10.	M. R. K. Panneerselvam	Minister for Health	Health; Medical Education; Family Welfare	DMK
11.	Pongalur N. Palanisamy	Minister for Rural Industries and Animal Husbandry	Rural Industries including Cottage Industries and Small Industries; Animal Husbandry	DMK
12.	I. Periyasamy	Minister for Revenue and Housing	Revenue; District Revenue Establishment; Deputy Collectors; Prisons; Weights and Measures; Debt Relief including Legislation on *Money Lending; Chits; Registration of Companies; Housing; Rural Housing and Housing Development	DMK
13.	N. Suresh Rajan	Minister for Tourism and Regeneration	Tourism and Tourism Development Corporation; Registration and Stamp Act.	DMK
14.	E. V. Velu	Minister for Food	Food; Civil Supplies; Consumer Protection and Price Control.	DMK
15.	Suba. Thangavelan	Minister for Slum Clearance and Accommodation Control	Slum Clearance Board; Accommodation Control	DMK
16.	Parithi Ellamvazhuthi	Minister for Information	Information and Publicity; Film Technology and Cinematograph Act *Stationery and Printing and Government *Press; Town Planning; Urban Development and Chennai Metropolitan Development Authority	DMK
17.	K. K. S. S. R. Ramachandran	Minister for Backward Classes	Backward Classes; Most Backward Classes and De-notified Communities; Overseas Indians; Refugees and Evacuees; Handlooms and Textiles.	DMK
18.	T. M. Anbarasan	Minister for Labour	Labour; Population; Employment and Training; Steel Control; Newsprint Control; Census; Urban and Rural Employment.	DMK
19.	K. R. Periakaruppan	Minister for Hindu Religious and Charitable Endowments	Hindu Religious and Charitable Endowments	DMK
20.	Thangam Thenarasu	Minister for School Education	School Educationand; Archaeology	DMK
21.	S. N. M. Ubayadullah	Minister for Commercial Taxes	Commercial Taxes	DMK
22.	T. P. M. Mohideen Khan	Minister for Environment	Sports and Youth Welfare; Environment; Pollution Control; Wakfs	DMK
23.	Vellakoil Saminathan	Minister for Highways and Minor Ports	Highways; Minor Ports	DMK
24.	N. Selvaraj	Minister for Forests	Forests and Cinchona	DMK
25.	Dr. Poongothai Aladi Aruna	Minister for Information Technology	Information Technology	DMK
26.	P. Geetha Jeevan	Minister for Social Welfare	Social Welfare including Women's and Children Welfare; Nutritious Noon Meal; Welfare of the Disabled; Orphanages and Correctional Administration; Integrated Child Development; Beggar Homes	DMK
27.	A. Tamilarasi	Minister for Adi Dravidar Welfare	Adi Dravidar Welfare; Hill Tribes; Bonded Labour	DMK
28.	U. Mathivanan	Minister for Animal Husbandry	Animal Husbandry	DMK
29.	K. P. P. Samy	Minister for Fisheries	Fisheries and Fisheries Development Corporation	DMK
30.	K. Ramachandhiran	Minister for Khadi	Khadi and Village Industries; Bhoodhan and Gramadhan.	DMK
