= K. Thangamani =

Indian politician

K. Thangamani is an Indian politician and former Member of the Legislative Assembly of Tamil Nadu. He was elected to the Tamil Nadu legislative assembly as a Communist Party of India candidate from Manamadurai constituency in 1996 election. The constituency was reserved for candidates from the Scheduled Castes.
