= V. M. Subramanian =

Indian politician

V. M. Subramanian is an Indian politician. He is a former Member of the Legislative Assembly of Tamil Nadu.

== Career ==
He was elected to the Tamil Nadu legislative assembly as an Anna Dravida Munnetra Kazhagam candidate from Manamadurai constituency in 1977 election. First time he contested and won Manamadurai constituency easily in 1977 to enter assembly. He contested again as a candidate of Namadhu kazhagam (s.d.somasundaram party) in 1984. After the demise of M.G.R. while the party split as ADMK(J) and ADMK (JANAKI) he stood and contested again back third time in same constituency in ADMK (jayalalitha) party by 1989. He was defeated with margin of less than 2000 votes. Again he was given chance in 1991 in ADMK and won with more than 20,000 votes margin. he held various posts in assembly estimate committee and other committees. He is quite familiar among people for his simplicity and "Mr. clean" image. He uses the public transport always and never owned a car which is a basic amenity of any politicians. He started college life in Madurai medical college in M.B.B.S course. After a year he discontinued his medico path and decided to continue in law profession. He finished his B.L. in Madras law college. Then he started practicing in madras high court. Later he joined M.L. (Contract) and half a way he quit because of his political interest. He served in various government sectors before entering politics. He gave up his Group I officer cadre opportunity as he chosen a political career in 1977. In party, he hold district treasurer and district deputy secretary for several years.
