= Manamadurai Assembly constituency =

One of the 234 State Legislative Assembly Constituencies in Tamil Nadu, in India

Coordinates: 9.7°N 78.48°E

Manamadurai
- Constituency No. 187 for the Tamil Nadu Legislative Assembly

Constituency details
- Country: India
- Region: South India
- State: Tamil Nadu
- District: Sivaganga
- Lok Sabha constituency: Sivaganga
- Established: 1951
- Total electors: 2,60,203
- Reservation: SC

Member of Legislative Assembly
- 17th Tamil Nadu Legislative Assembly
- Incumbent Elangovan.D
- Party: Tamilaga Vettri Kalagam
- Elected year: 2026

Manamadurai is the 187th state assembly constituency in Tamil Nadu. It is a Scheduled Caste reserved constituency located in Sivaganga district. It is a component of Sivaganga Lok Sabha constituency. In 2008, Ilaiyangudi Assembly constituency was merged with Manamadurai Assembly constituency under the constituency delimitation act. It is one of the 234 State Legislative Assembly Constituencies in Tamil Nadu, in India.

Some of the major demands of people in Manamadurai constituency include constructing new bus stands at Thiruppuvanam and Suranam and upgrading the bus stands present in Manamadurai, Ilaiyangudi and Salaigramam, and also to operate the TNSTC Karaikudi division bus depot located at Manamadurai SIPCOT into a full swing manner instead of operating it as a temporary subdepot. To bring an Agro Based Industry related with capsicum plantations near Ilaiyangudi as these areas have more capsicum plantations. They also include the revival of SIPCOT at Manamadurai and SIDCO at Kirungakottai near Manamadurai and also to operate the announced new SIDCO at Manamadurai as well as upgrading village roads to highway roads which are present between Manamadurai and Naraikudi via Annavasal, Maraiyur and Salaigramam to Devakottai via Suranam, Sarukani. Manamadurai Assembly constituency consists of three taluks namely Manamadurai taluk, Ilayangudi taluk and Tiruppuvanam taluk.

Elections and winners in the constituency are listed below.

== Members of Legislative Assembly ==
Year	Member	Political party
Madras State
1952	Krishnaswami Iyengar	Indian National Congress
1957	R. Chidambara Bharathi	Indian National Congress
1962	K. Cheemaichamy	Swatantra Party
1967	K. Cheemaichamy	Swatantra Party
Tamil Nadu
1971	T. Soniah	Dravida Munnetra Kazhagam
1977	V. M. Subramanian	All India Anna Dravida Munnetra Kazhagam
1980	K. Paramalai	Independent
1984	K. Paramalai	Indian National Congress
1989	P. Duraipandi	Dravida Munnetra Kazhagam
1991	V. M. Subramanian	All India Anna Dravida Munnetra Kazhagam
1996	K. Thangamani	Communist Party of India
2001	K. Paramalai	Tamil Maanila Congress
2006	M. Gunasekaran	All India Anna Dravida Munnetra Kazhagam
2011	M. Gunasekaran	All India Anna Dravida Munnetra Kazhagam
2016	S. Mariappankennady (Note: Disqualification by Assembly Speaker 2017)	All India Anna Dravida Munnetra Kazhagam
2019^	S. Nagarajan	All India Anna Dravida Munnetra Kazhagam
2021	A. Tamilarasi	Dravida Munnetra Kazhagam
2026	D. Elangovan	Tamilaga Vettri Kazhagam

== Election results ==
Vote share of winning candidates
2026	33.54%
2021	43.91%
2019 by-election	43.32%
2016	48.45%
2011	51.68%
2006	48.87%
2001	57.06%
1996	49.82%
1991	69.77%
1989	36.08%
1984	61.67%
1980	50.52%
1977	40.23%
1971	56.79%
1967	44.42%
1962	54.62%
1957	44.54%
1952	62.08%

=== 2026 ===
2026 Tamil Nadu Legislative Assembly election: Manamadurai
Party	Candidate	Votes	%	±%
TVK	D. Elangovan	69,971	33.54	New
DMK	A. Tamilarasi	68,763	32.96	▼10.95
BJP	V. Balaganapathy	42,610	20.42	New
RPI	V. Arumugam	1,692	0.81	New
AIPTMMK	K. Thilagaraj	1,686	0.81	New
NOTA	NOTA	846	0.41	▼0.25
Margin of victory		1,208	0.58	▼6.34
Turnout		2,08,643	80.18	▲6.92
Registered electors		2,60,203		▼17,560
TVK gain from DMK		Swing	▲33.54	

=== 2021 ===
2021 Tamil Nadu Legislative Assembly election: Manamadurai
Party	Candidate	Votes	%	±%
DMK	A. Tamilarasi	89,364	43.91	+3.49
AIADMK	S. Nagarajan	75,273	36.99	−11.46
AMMK	S. Mariappankennady	10,231	5.03	New
MNM	P. Sivasankari	2,257	1.11	New
NOTA	NOTA	1,335	0.66	−0.53
Independent	C. Rajaiah	369	0.18	New
Anaithu Makkal Puratchi Katchi	M. Chandrasekar	229	0.11	New
Independent	K. Muthumari	185	0.09	New
Independent	S. Thamaraiselvi	142	0.07	New
AMGRDMK	M. Muralitharan	128	0.06	New
Margin of victory		14,091	6.92	−1.10
Turnout		203,497	73.26	0.53
Rejected ballots		436	0.21	
Registered electors		277,763		
DMK gain from AIADMK		Swing	-4.54	

=== 2019 by-election ===
2019 Tamil Nadu Legislative Assembly by-elections: Manamadurai
Party	Candidate	Votes	%	±%
AIADMK	S. Nagarajan	85,228	43.32	
DMK	K. Kasilingam	77,034	39.15	
AMMK	S. Mariappan Kennady	20,395	10.37	
NOTA	None of the Above	1618	0.82	
Majority		8,184		
Turnout		1,95,145	74.54	
Registered electors		2,63,454		
AIADMK hold		Swing		

=== 2016 ===
2016 Tamil Nadu Legislative Assembly election: Manamadurai
Party	Candidate	Votes	%	±%
AIADMK	S. Mariappankennady	89,893	48.45	−3.23
DMK	S. Chitraselvi	75,004	40.43	−2.58
VCK	Deepa Anbalagan	7,493	4.04	New
BJP	M. Rajendran	3,493	1.88	+1.15
NOTA	NOTA	2,193	1.18	New
SDPI	A. Kasinathadurai	1,515	0.82	New
Margin of victory		14,889	8.03	−0.65
Turnout		185,522	72.73	−3.89
Registered electors		255,081		
AIADMK hold		Swing	-3.23	

=== 2011 ===
2011 Tamil Nadu Legislative Assembly election: Manamadurai
Party	Candidate	Votes	%	±%
AIADMK	M. Gunasekaran	83,535	51.68	+2.81
DMK	A. Tamilarasi	69,515	43.01	New
BSP	K. Murugavelrajan	2,883	1.78	+1.15
Independent	O. Velmurugan	1,766	1.09	New
BJP	V. Viswanatha Gopalan	1,185	0.73	−0.38
Independent	R. Ayyanar	1,135	0.70	New
Margin of victory		14,020	8.67	−1.79
Turnout		210,956	76.62	15.59
Registered electors		161,626		
AIADMK hold		Swing	2.81	

=== 2006 ===
2006 Tamil Nadu Legislative Assembly election: Manamadurai
Party	Candidate	Votes	%	±%
AIADMK	M. Gunasekaran	53,492	48.87	New
INC	K. Paramalai	42,037	38.40	New
DMDK	P. Mayandi	9,020	8.24	New
BJP	Ayyadurair	1,222	1.12	−34.88
TNJC	K. Arumugam	1,218	1.11	New
Independent	K. Kamalakannan	1,091	1.00	New
BSP	R. Alwarsamy	692	0.63	New
Independent	C. Ramachandran	686	0.63	New
Margin of victory		11,455	10.47	−10.59
Turnout		109,458	61.03	4.95
Registered electors		179,349		
AIADMK gain from TMC(M)		Swing	-8.19	

=== 2001 ===
2001 Tamil Nadu Legislative Assembly election: Manamadurai
Party	Candidate	Votes	%	±%
TMC(M)	K. Paramalai	56,508	57.06	New
BJP	S. P. Kirubanidhi	35,651	36.00	+35.11
Independent	S. Selvaraj	4,090	4.13	New
Independent	C. Thirumurugaselvam	1,563	1.58	New
JD(U)	A. Kasinathadurai	1,224	1.24	New
Margin of victory		20,857	21.06	3.22
Turnout		99,036	56.08	−8.62
Registered electors		176,612		
TMC(M) gain from CPI		Swing	7.23	

=== 1996 ===
1996 Tamil Nadu Legislative Assembly election: Manamadurai
Party	Candidate	Votes	%	±%
CPI	K. Thangamani	49,639	49.82	New
AIADMK	M. Gunasekaran	31,869	31.99	−37.78
CPI(M)	K. Balasubramanian	12,349	12.39	New
AIIC(T)	K. S. M. Manimuthu	4,407	4.42	New
BJP	M. Pitchai	884	0.89	New
Margin of victory		17,770	17.84	−22.14
Turnout		99,629	64.69	1.96
Registered electors		164,936		
CPI gain from AIADMK		Swing	-19.95	

=== 1991 ===
1991 Tamil Nadu Legislative Assembly election: Manamadurai
Party	Candidate	Votes	%	±%
AIADMK	V. M. Subramanian	66,823	69.77	+37.17
DMK	K. Kasilingam	28,535	29.79	−6.28
Margin of victory		38,288	39.98	36.50
Turnout		95,775	62.73	−7.53
Registered electors		157,865		
AIADMK gain from DMK		Swing	33.69	

=== 1989 ===
1989 Tamil Nadu Legislative Assembly election: Manamadurai
Party	Candidate	Votes	%	±%
DMK	P. Duraipandi	35,809	36.08	New
AIADMK	V. M. Subramanian	32,357	32.60	New
INC	K. Paramalai	23,761	23.94	−37.73
Independent	C. Narayanan	5,768	5.81	New
Margin of victory		3,452	3.48	−28.94
Turnout		99,253	70.26	−0.50
Registered electors		143,783		
DMK gain from INC		Swing	-25.59	

=== 1984 ===
1984 Tamil Nadu Legislative Assembly election: Manamadurai
Party	Candidate	Votes	%	±%
INC	K. Paramalai	52,587	61.67	+13.26
TNC(K)	V. Gopal	24,946	29.25	New
Independent	V. M. Subramanian	5,974	7.01	New
Independent	R. Chinnathambi	747	0.88	New
Independent	K. Nagasamy	559	0.66	New
Margin of victory		27,641	32.41	30.30
Turnout		85,274	70.76	5.93
Registered electors		127,807		
INC gain from Independent		Swing	11.15	

=== 1980 ===
1980 Tamil Nadu Legislative Assembly election: Manamadurai
Party	Candidate	Votes	%	±%
Independent	K. Paramalai	38,435	50.52	New
INC	U. Krishnan	36,824	48.40	+11.04
Independent	R P. Ramasamy	507	0.67	New
Margin of victory		1,611	2.12	−0.75
Turnout		76,077	64.83	2.38
Registered electors		118,672		
Independent gain from AIADMK		Swing	10.30	

=== 1977 ===
1977 Tamil Nadu Legislative Assembly election: Manamadurai
Party	Candidate	Votes	%	±%
AIADMK	V. M. Subramanian	28,849	40.23	New
INC	K. Paramalai	26,794	37.36	−5.85
DMK	N. Veeranan	12,090	16.86	−39.93
JP	S. Subramanian	3,615	5.04	New
Independent	K. Palanikudumban	371	0.52	New
Margin of victory		2,055	2.87	−10.71
Turnout		71,719	62.46	−11.97
Registered electors		116,220		
AIADMK gain from DMK		Swing	-16.56	

=== 1971 ===
1971 Tamil Nadu Legislative Assembly election: Manamadurai
Party	Candidate	Votes	%	±%
DMK	T. Soniah	42,584	56.79	New
INC	S. Sankaralingam	32,405	43.21	−0.55
Margin of victory		10,179	13.57	12.92
Turnout		74,989	74.43	−3.93
Registered electors		103,239		
DMK gain from SWA		Swing	12.37	

=== 1967 ===
1967 Madras Legislative Assembly election: Manamadurai
Party	Candidate	Votes	%	±%
SWA	K. Cheemaichamy	30,752	44.42	New
INC	C. B. Rena	30,299	43.77	+0.86
CPI	M. Athimoolam	8,176	11.81	New
Margin of victory		453	0.65	−11.06
Turnout		69,227	78.36	9.10
Registered electors		94,532		
SWA hold		Swing	-10.20	

=== 1962 ===
1962 Madras Legislative Assembly election: Manamadurai
Party	Candidate	Votes	%	±%
SWA	K. Cheemaichamy	33,895	54.62	New
INC	M. Amin Nainar Howth	26,627	42.91	−1.64
We Tamils	S. Ramachandran	1,534	2.47	New
Margin of victory		7,268	11.71	−5.93
Turnout		62,056	69.26	22.75
Registered electors		92,568		
SWA gain from INC		Swing	10.08	

=== 1957 ===
1957 Madras Legislative Assembly election: Manamadurai
Party	Candidate	Votes	%	±%
INC	R. Chidambara Bharathi	18,680	44.54	−17.53
Independent	S. Alagu	11,282	26.90	New
Independent	R. Sethu Servai	4,994	11.91	New
Independent	S. Sakthivel	4,992	11.90	New
Independent	N. Ayyakutti	1,988	4.74	New
Margin of victory		7,398	17.64	−25.11
Turnout		41,936	46.51	0.19
Registered electors		90,168		
INC hold		Swing	-17.53	

=== 1952 ===
1952 Madras Legislative Assembly election: Manamadurai
Party	Candidate	Votes	%	±%
INC	Krishnaswami Iyengar	22,274	62.08	New
CPI	Abdul Gafoor	6,935	19.33	New
Socialist Party (India)	Raman	4,016	11.19	New
AIFB	Palaniswami Servai	2,657	7.40	New
Margin of victory		15,339	42.75	
Turnout		35,882	46.32	
Registered electors		77,467		
INC win (new seat)				
