= S. Nagarajan =

Indian politician

S. Nagarajan is an Indian politician and is Member of the Legislative Assembly of Tamil Nadu. He was elected to the Tamil Nadu legislative assembly as an All India Anna Dravida Munnetra Kazhagam candidate from Manamadurai constituency in the by-election in 2019.

== See also ==
- TANSI land acquisition case
