= M. Gunasekaran =

Indian politician (born 1962)

M. Gunasekaran (born 3 June 1962) is an Indian politician and has twice been elected as a Member of the Legislative Assembly of Tamil Nadu from the Manamadurai constituency.

== Personal life ==
Gunasekaran was born in Nelmadur on 3 June 1962. He has a BA degree and is married with three children.

Gunasekaran lists agriculture as his occupation. A study comparing sworn election affidavits for members of the Tamil Nadu Legislative Assembly who had won their seats in the 2006 elections and were standing as candidates in those of 2011 revealed that Gunasekaran had recorded the biggest percentage increase in assets. The increase was 3396 per cent.

In June 2014, Gunasekaran was hospitalised, with police saying his condition was "highly critical", after being attacked by several people while talking with a group of friends in Manamadurai. Police said that the attack happened after a heated discussion with one of the attackers regarding property rights.

== Politics ==
Gunasekaran was first elected to the Tamil Nadu Legislative Assembly as an All India Anna Dravida Munnetra Kazhagam (AIADMK) candidate from Manamadurai constituency in the 2006 elections. The constituency is reserved for candidates from the Scheduled Castes. He was particularly active in asking questions in the house, raising 16,057 queries during the 13th Assembly, and was re-elected from the same constituency at the next election, in 2011.

The elections of 2016 resulted in his constituency being won by the AIADMK's S. Mariappankennady, who the party had determined should replace Gunasekaran.

In January 2017, Gunasekaran announced that he could not work with the current AIADMK leadership, who he said wanted to encourage dynastic politics. He had been a strong supporter of Jayalalithaa, the AIADMK leader and Chief Minister who had recently died, and preferred to support Deepa Jayakumar, Jayalalithaa's niece, in her bid to head the party. He said that he had been a supporter of AIADMK since 1987 and that his decision to favour Jayakumar's aspirations was backed by many thousands of AIADMK people in Sivaganga district, in which the Manamadurai constituency is situated. He felt the new leadership was being unfair in its allocation of party positions in the district.
