= N. Subramanian =

Indian politician

N. Subramanian is an Indian politician and incumbent member of the Tamil Nadu from Gandarvakottai constituency. He was Minister for Adi Dravidar and Tribal Welfare in the Government of Tamil Nadu in 2013. He represents Anna Dravida Munnetra Kazhagam party.
