= Nainar Nagendran =

Indian politician

Nainar Nagenthran

Cabinet Minister Government of Tamil Nadu
- In office 10 June 2002 – 12 May 2006
- Minister: Industries
- Chief Minister: J. Jayalalithaa
- Preceded by: S. M. Velusamy
- Succeeded by: M. Karunanidhi
- Constituency: Tirunelveli
- In office 2 March 2002 – 2 June 2003
- Minister: Electricity
- Chief Minister: J. Jayalalithaa
- Preceded by: D. Jayakumar
- Succeeded by: D. Jayakumar
- Constituency: Tirunelveli
- In office 29 August 2002 – 12 November 2002
- Minister: Rural Industries
- Chief Minister: J. Jayalalithaa
- Preceded by: R. Vilvanathan
- Succeeded by: R. Vadivel
- Constituency: Tirunelveli
- In office 19 May 2001 – 2 March 2002
- Minister: Transport
- Chief Minister: J. Jayalalithaa; O. Panneerselvam
- Preceded by: K. Ponmudy
- Succeeded by: Natham R. Viswanathan
- Constituency: Tirunelveli

Member of the Tamil Nadu Legislative Assembly
- In office 12 May 2021 – 4 May 2026
- Chief Minister: M. K. Stalin
- Preceded by: A. L. S. Lakshmanan
- Constituency: Tirunelveli
- In office 23 May 2011 – 21 May 2016
- Chief Minister: J. Jayalalithaa; O. Panneerselvam
- Preceded by: N. Malai Raja
- Succeeded by: A. L. S. Lakshmanan
- Constituency: Tirunelveli
- In office 22 May 2001 – 12 May 2006
- Chief Minister: J. Jayalalithaa; O. Panneerselvam
- Preceded by: A. L. Subramanian
- Succeeded by: N. Malai Raja
- Constituency: Tirunelveli

President of the Bharatiya Janata Party – Tamil Nadu
- Incumbent
- Assumed office 12 April 2025
- National President: JP Nadda; Nitin Nabin
- Preceded by: K. Annamalai

Vice President of the Bharatiya Janata Party – Tamil Nadu
- In office 3 July 2020 – 12 April 2025
- President: L. Murugan; K. Annamalai

Personal details
- Born: 16 October 1960 (age 66) Vadiveeswaram, Madras State, India (present-day Tamil Nadu, India)
- Party: Bharatiya Janata Party
- Other political affiliations: All India Anna Dravida Munnetra Kazhagam (until 2017)

Nainar Nagenthran (born 16 October 1960) is an Indian politician who is the state president of the Bharatiya Janata Party in Tamil Nadu (BJPTN), from 12 April 2025. From 19 May 2001 to 12 May 2006, he served as the minister of Tamil Nadu in the ministry led by former chief ministers of Tamil Nadu J. Jayalalithaa and O. Panneerselvam.

He is the current legislative leader of the Bharatiya Janata Party in the Tamil Nadu Legislative Assembly. He has won the Tamil Nadu Legislative Assembly elections from the Tirunelveli constituency in 2001 and 2011 as an All India Anna Dravida Munnetra Kazhagam candidate and in 2021 as a Bharatiya Janata Party candidate.

== Political career ==
He left the All India Anna Dravida Munnetra Kazhagam (AIADMK) party in August 2017 to join the Bharatiya Janata Party (BJP). He was one of several AIADMK party members to do so and soon after his move he was appointed a state-level BJP vice-president.

As an AIADMK candidate, Nagendran was elected as a Member of the Legislative Assembly (MLA) from Tirunelveli constituency in the 2001 and 2011 state assembly elections. He lost the seat by 606 votes in the election of 2006 and in 2016, when the difference was 601. His opponent in the latter election was A. L. S. Lakshmanan of the Dravida Munnetra Kazhagam (DMK), a person he had beaten in 2011 by over 38,000 votes.

Nagendran served variously as a Minister for Electricity, Industry and Transport during the AIADMK-led government of 2001–2006. He was not a member of the cabinet during the AIADMK government led by Jayalalithaa from 2011 but he said it was her death and the subsequent rudderless situation in which the party found itself that caused his move to the BJP in 2017.

In 2021, as a BJP candidate Nagendran has been elected to Tamil Nadu state assembly from Tirunelveli constituency for the third time defeating the DMK candidate by a margin of 23,107 votes. In addition he has been also selected as the leader of BJP members in Tamil Nadu assembly.

== Legal cases ==
=== Disproportionate assets case ===
The Directorate of Vigilance and Anti-Corruption of Tamil Nadu conducted raids in 12 places belonging to Nagendran in various parts of Chennai, Kochi, and his native place of southern Tirunelveli district. In 2006, an investigation revealed the accumulation of assets in excess of his income when he was a minister of Tamil Nadu. It also revealed that Nagendran bought properties, including gold jewellery and lands. A chargesheet was filed in December 2010 against Nagendran, his wife and four other relatives under the Prevention of Corruption Act for a ₹3.9 crore disproportionate assets case by the Directorate of Vigilance.

=== 2023 Vadapalani Temple land-grabbing case ===
In April 2023, the anti-corruption non-governmental organisation Arappor Iyakkam submitted a formal complaint to the Tamil Nadu government alleging an illegal land transaction involving Nainar Nagendran's son, Nainar Balaji, the vice-president of the BJP's youth wing. The complaint alleged an attempt to illegally grab 1.30 acres of land belonging to Vadapalani Andavar Temple, located on Arcot Road in Virugambakkam, Chennai, valued at approximately ₹100 crore in collusion with the land mafia and government officers. According to the complaint, a sale agreement worth ₹46 crore was executed in July 2022 between Nainar Balaji and an individual named Elayaraja while the Patta was originally under the names of Sundaramahalingam and Vasanta, but the revenue department illegally changed the patta to a deceased individual's name (Gulab Doss Narayan Doss) to facilitate the deal. The organization claimed that Nainar Nagendran misused his position as an MLA to pressure or maneuver public servants within the revenue and registration departments into facilitate registering the land parcel in Chennai at Radhapuram sub-Registrar Office (SRO) in the Tirunelveli district in violation of registration procedures and relevant IPC procedures.

An investigation overseen by the Tirunelveli Regional Deputy Inspector General of Registration confirmed prima facie evidence of fraud and procedural lapses. On 10 July 2023, the state registration department officially cancelled the registration of land.

=== 2024 Election cash seizure case ===
During the 2024 Indian general election, on 24 April 2024, the Election Commission’s flying squad recovered ₹4 crore at Tambaram railway station from a train traveling from Chennai Egmore to Tirunelveli. Three individuals were arrested in connection with the incident. The primary accused, Sathish, was identified as a BJP member and the manager of the Blue Diamond Hotel in Chennai, a business linked to Nagendran. During interrogation, the accused stated that the money was being transported to Tirunelveli to distribute to voters under Nagendran’s explicit directives. Police recovered a copy of Nagendran's identity proof from the accused and noted that the men used an Emergency Quota (EQ) train ticket booking request written on Nagendran’s official letterhead.

While the Income Tax Department was initially alerted, the case was formally transferred to the CB-CID Metro wing. By mid-2025, CB-CID investigations escalated. The agency presented evidence in court revealing a hawala network involving multiple top-tier Tamil Nadu BJP functionaries. Call data records (CDRs) confirmed coordination between Nagendran and several state BJP leaders including BJP State Organisation General Secretary Kesava Vinayagam, BJP State Treasurer S.R. Sekhar, and the party's Industrial Wing president Govardhan. Investigators also unearthed a parallel route where nearly ₹1 crore of the operation's cash had been successfully exchanged for 1.5 kilograms of gold.

== Controversies ==
Nainar Nagendran has sent death threats against acclaimed Tamil lyricist and writer Vairamuthu in January 2018 for his controversial remarks on Andal. He has announced that BJP leaders are ready to award a cash reward of ₹10 crore if anyone slays and chops the tongue of Vairamuthu. He also said there should be no hesitation in killing even those who speak ill of Hinduism. This created a giant controversy in Tamil Nadu. Later, he was arrested together with Hindu Munnani state vice-president, V. C. Jayabalan, for provocative hate speech that would cause divisiveness among the people and posed a threat to national unity.

On 15 August 2026, Nagendran made a personal remark involving the mother of Tamil Nadu Chief Minister C. Joseph Vijay at BJP's party headquarters in Chennai. Responding to an earlier "where is your father" jibe made by Vijay in the Assembly regarding DMK leader Udhayanidhi Stalin, Nagendran stated that instead of searching for a father in the Legislative Assembly, one should go home and ask their mother to know who the father is. The comment drew widespread condemnation across political lines including BJP vice president Khushbu Sundar and former BJP state chief K. Annamalai. A complaint was lodged against Nagendran at the Director General of Police (DGP) office by a woman advocate seeking police action for public misconduct and defamation. Nagendran issued a clarification stating that his speech had been twisted and misrepresented for political gain.

== Elections contested and positions held ==
=== Lok Sabha elections ===
Elections	Lok Sabha	Constituency	Political party	Result	Vote percentage	Opposition		
Elections	Lok Sabha	Constituency	Political party	Result	Vote percentage	Candidate	Political party	Vote percentage
2019	17th	Ramanathapuram	BJP	Lost	32.13%	K. Navaskani	IUML	44.05%
2024	18th	Tirunelveli	BJP	Lost	31.54%	C. Robert Bruce	INC	47.06%

=== Tamil Nadu Legislative Assembly elections ===
Elections	Assembly	Constituency	Political party	Result	Vote percentage	Opposition		
Elections	Assembly	Constituency	Political party	Result	Vote percentage	Candidate	Political party	Vote percentage
2001	12th	Tirunelveli	AIADMK	Won	40.93%	A. L. Subramanian	DMK	40.24%
2006	13th	Tirunelveli	AIADMK	Lost	45.42%	N. Malai Raja	DMK	45.85%
2011	14th	Tirunelveli	AIADMK	Won	54.81%	A. L. S. Lakshmanan	DMK	30.34%
2016	15th	Tirunelveli	AIADMK	Lost	42.81%	A. L. S. Lakshmanan	DMK	43.13%
2021	16th	Tirunelveli	BJP	Won	46.70%	A. L. S. Lakshmanan	DMK	35.01%
2026	17th	Sattur	BJP	Lost	28.21%	A. Kadarkarairaj	DMK	31.23%

=== Positions in Tamil Nadu Legislative Assembly ===
Elections	Position	Elected constituency	Term in office		
Elections	Position	Elected constituency	Assumed office	Left office	Time in office
2001	Minister for Transport	Tirunelveli	19 May 2001	2 March 2002	287 days
2001	Minister for Electricity	Tirunelveli	2 March 2002	9 June 2002	99 days
2001	Minister for Electricity and Industries	Tirunelveli	10 June 2002	28 August 2002	79 days
2001	Minister for Electricity and Industries and Rural Industries	Tirunelveli	29 August 2002	12 November 2002	75 days
2001	Minister for Electricity and Industries	Tirunelveli	13 November 2002	2 June 2003	201 days
2001	Minister for Industries	Tirunelveli	3 June 2003	12 May 2006	2 years, 343 days
2011	Member of the Legislative Assembly	Tirunelveli	23 May 2011	21 May 2016	4 years, 364 days
2021	Member of the Legislative Assembly	Tirunelveli	11 May 2021	10 May 2026	4 years, 364 days
