= R. M. Veerappan =

Indian film producer, screenwriter and politician (1926–2024)

R.M. Veerappan
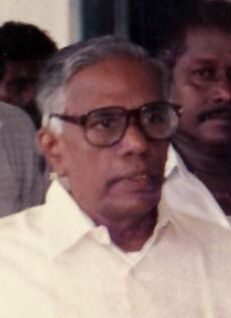
- Veerappan in 1992

Minister for Information and Hindu Religious Endowments
- In office 30 June 1977 – 17 February 1980
- In office 9 June 1980 – 9 February 1985

Minister for Local Administration
- In office 10 February 1985 – 30 January 1988

Minister of Education and Youth Welfare
- In office 24 June 1991 – 23 February 1992

Minister of Backward Classes
- In office 23 February 1992 – 20 May 1992

Minister of Food
- In office 17 May 1993 – 19 August 1995

Minister of Animal Husbandry
- In office 19 August 1995 – 1 September 1995

Joint General Secretary of All India Anna Dravida Munnetra Kazhagam
- In office 1989–1993
- General Secretary: J.Jayalalithaa
- Deputy: V. R. Nedunchezhiyan
- Preceded by: position established
- Succeeded by: position abolished

Leader of the House Tamil Nadu Legislative Assembly
- In office 7 January 1988 – 30 January 1988

Member of the Tamil Nadu Legislative Assembly
- In office 29 August 1991 – 12 May 1996
- Preceded by: J. Jayalalithaa
- Succeeded by: N. S. Rajkumar Manraadiar
- Constituency: Kangayam
- In office 1986–1988
- Preceded by: S. Narayanan
- Succeeded by: A. L. Subramanian
- Constituency: Tirunelveli

Member of the Tamil Nadu Legislative Council
- In office 1977–1986
- Constituency: Elected By MLAs

Personal details
- Born: 9 September 1926 Vallathirakottai, Pudukkottai State, British India
- Died: 9 April 2024 (aged 97) Chennai, Tamil Nadu, India
- Party: DMK, AIADMK, MGR Kazhagam
- Spouse: Rajammal
- Children: 6
- Parents: Ramasamy (father); Deivanai (mother)
- Occupation: Film producer, Screenwriter and Politician

R. M. Veerappan (9 September 1926 – 9 April 2024), also referred to as RMV or Rama Veerappan, was an Indian film producer, screenwriter and politician from the Indian state of Tamil Nadu. He was the founder and leader of the MGR Kazhagam party. He served as a Cabinet Minister in five governments from 1977 to 1996, was a three-time Member of Legislative Council and a two-time Member of the Legislative Assembly. He was the Leader of the House for Legislative Assembly and Leader of ADMK party of the Legislative Council. He was the architect behind the ADMK organization, unified the MGR fan clubs for the party formation. He was called as the 'Chanakya' of AIADMK politics in the 70's and 80's.

== Political and entertainment career ==
Veerappan was introduced to Periyar in Karaikudi by Rama Subbaiah. He soon began to follow his Dravidian ideologies. He moved to Erode with Periyar and was there with him for some time. He met many other Dravidian leaders. He subsequently joined K R Ramaswamy's Krishnan Drama Company as supervisor. During this period, he became an admirer of Arignar Anna and also friends with Chevalier Sivaji Ganesan. The company was closed in 1950 and R. M. V. went to Madras.

In 1953 he met MGR through the advice of his mentor C N Annadurai and joined his drama company as Manager, later becoming an executive director of the Company Em.Gee.Yar Pictures. Nadodi Mannan was the first film under this banner which was released on 22 August 1958. The company later filmed Adimai Penn and Ulagam sutrum Valiban.

Veerappan later started his own production house and the banner's debut movie titled "Deiva Thai," with MGR in the lead role, was released in 1964. Director K Balachander made his debut into the Tamil film industry by writing the dialogues for this movie. Following that, MGR and RMV appeared together in many movies under this banner, such as Naan Anayittal, Kaavalkaran, Kannan En Kadhalan and Idhaya Kani. Rickshawkaran, produced by Sathya Movies, helped MGR achieve the National award for his performance. In addition to this, the production house made films including Kadhal Parisu, Kakki Chattai, Ranuva Veeran, Moondru Mugam, Thanga Magan, Oor Kavalan, Panakaran, Baasha, Mandhira Punnagai, and Puthiya Vaanam. Among his movies, Basha, was remarkable and set box office records in all major South Indian languages.

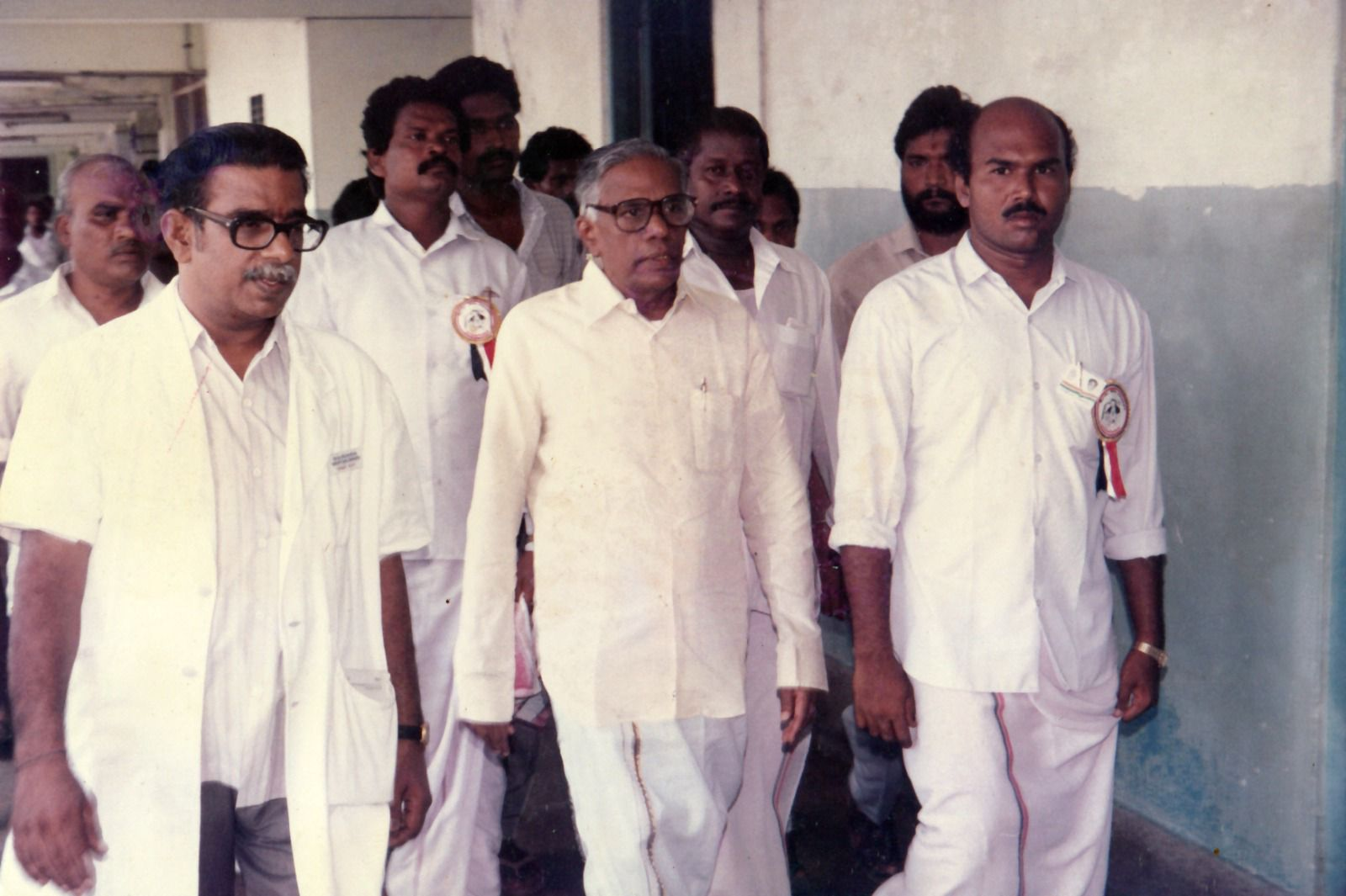
Veerappan with AIADMK functionaries at chennai

Veerappan was using the super star status of MGR to propagate the DMK ideologies in his films and Rickshawkaran was a prime example where the movie was used to propagate Arignar Anna's DMK ideology during 1971 elections. When MGR moved out of the DMK following differences with M. Karunanidhi in 1972, RMV organised the fan clubs and helped him in starting the AIADMK. In 1984, while MGR was ill, K. RMV, oversaw the party proceedings and election campaigning. Following the death of MGR in 1987, the party broke up into two factions where the larger faction was headed by him. He garnered support of 98 MLA's to instill V.N. Janaki as the Chief Minister and then later reconciled with J. Jayalalithaa's faction and was the Joint General Secretary of the party.

Veerappan was elected to the legislative assembly two times and to the legislative council three times. He was elected to the Tamil Nadu legislative assembly in the Tirunelveli constituency as an Anna Dravida Munnetra Kazhagam candidate in the Tamil Nadu state assembly by-election in 1986 after S. Narayan vacated and in the Kangayam constituency of Tamil Nadu state assembly by-election in 1991 after Jayalalithaa vacated her seat.

== M.G.R. Kazhagam ==
M.G.R. Kazhagam (M.G.R. Federation), a political party in the Indian state of Tamil Nadu. The president of M.G.R. Kazhagam was R. M. Veerappan, a former All India Anna Dravida Munnetra Kazhagam (AIADMK) founder and leader of the House.

M.G.R. Kazhagam supported the Dravida Munnetra Kazhagam (DMK)-led Democratic Progressive Alliance in the 2004 Lok Sabha elections.and veeraragavan parliament election commission IND Lawyer sudha was mission tha tamilnadu

== Elections contested and positions held ==
=== Tamil Nadu Legislative Council elections ===
| Elections | Political party | Result |
|---|---|---|
| 1977 | AIADMK | Won |
| 1983 | AIADMK | Won |

=== Tamil Nadu Legislative Assembly Elections Contested ===
| Elections | Constituency | Party | Result | Vote percentage | Opposition Candidate | Opposition Party | Opposition vote percentage |
|---|---|---|---|---|---|---|---|
| 1986 Tamil Nadu By Election | Tirunelveli | AIADMK | Won | 56 | A. L. Subramanian | DMK | 41.94 |
| 1989 Tamil Nadu Legislative Assembly election | Pudukkottai | AIADMK(JR) | Lost | 20.89 | A. Periannan | DMK | 36.24 |
| 1991 Tamil Nadu By Election | Kangayam | AIADMK | Won | 96.57 | C. S. Amnachalam | Independent | 1.05 |
| 2001 Tamil Nadu Legislative Assembly election | Alandur | MGR Kazhagam | Lost | 41.25 | B. Valarmathi | AIADMK | 47.59 |

== Literary and social service activities ==
He was the founder and President of Kamban Kazhagam and Azhvargal Aaiyvu Maiyam. He also ran an education trust which funds the education of the oppressed.

== Personal life and death ==
Veerappan married Thirumathi Rajammal on 12 March 1956, in Thiruparangundram. The wedding was conducted in the Tamil tradition under Arignar Anna. They have 3 daughters and 3 sons. The eldest daughter, Thirumathi Selvi, married T. G. Thyagarajan of Sathya Jyothi Films, son of Thiru. Venus Govindarajan of Venus Pictures.

R. M. Veerappan died on 9 April 2024, at the age of 97.

== Filmography ==
| Year | Film | Cast | Notes |
|---|---|---|---|
| 1964 | Dheiva Thaai | M. G. Ramachandran, Saroja Devi, M. N. Nambiar | |
| 1966 | Naan Aanaiyittal | M. G. Ramachandran, Saroja Devi, K. R. Vijaya | |
| 1967 | Kaavalkaaran | M. G. Ramachandran, Jayalalithaa, Sivakumar | |
| 1968 | Kannan En Kadhalan | M. G. Ramachandran, Jayalalithaa, Vanisri | |
| 1969 | Kanni Penn | Jaishankar, Vanisri, Lakshmi, Sivakumar | |
| 1971 | Rickshawkaran | M. G. Ramachandran, Padmini, Manjula | |
| 1973 | Manipayal | A.V.M. Rajan, Jayanthi, Master Sekhar | |
| 1975 | Idhayakkani | M. G. Ramachandran, Radha Saluja | |
| 1980 | Oru Velladu Vengaiyagiradhu | Sivakumar, Saritha | |
| 1981 | Ranuva Veeran | Rajinikanth, Chiranjeevi, Sridevi | |
| 1982 | Moondru Mugam | Rajinikanth, Radhika, Senthamarai | |
| 1983 | Thanga Magan | Rajinikanth, Poornima Jayaram, Jaishankar | |
| 1985 | Kakki Sattai | Kamal Haasan, Madhavi, Ambika | |
| 1986 | Mandhira Punnagai | Sathyaraj, Nadhiya, Sujitha | |
| 1987 | Oorkavalan | Rajinikanth, Radhika, Raghuvaran | |
| 1987 | Kadhal Parisu | Kamal Haasan, Radha, Ambika | |
| 1988 | Puthiya Vaanam | Sivaji Ganesan, Sathyaraj, Rupini, Gautami | |
| 1989 | En Thangai | Arjun, Gautami | |
| 1990 | Panakkaran | Rajinikanth, Gautami, Vijayakumar | |
| 1990 | Nila Pennae | Anand, Divya Bharati | |
| 1991 | Pudhu Manithan | Sathyaraj, Bhanupriya, Sarath Kumar | |
| 1993 | Enga Thambi | Prashanth, Subhashri, Lakshmi | |
| 1995 | Baashha | Rajinikanth, Nagma, Raghuvaran | |
| 2006 | Em Magan | Bharath, Gopika, Nassar | |

=== Relationship with Rajinikanth ===
Film collaborations

R.M. Veerappan's production house Sathya Movies produced several films starring Rajinikanth, beginning with "Ranuva Veeran" (1981). Their collaboration continued with "Moondru Mugam" (1982), "Thanga Magan" (1983), "Oorkavalan" (1987), "Panakkaran" (1990), and "Baasha" (1995).

Political consequences of Baasha celebration

During the 100th-day celebration of "Baasha" in 1995, Rajinikanth delivered a speech criticizing hereditary politics and what he termed "bomb culture" in Tamil Nadu. The remarks were interpreted as criticism of Chief Minister J. Jayalalithaa. Following the event, R.M. Veerappan was dismissed from his ministerial position in Jayalalithaa's cabinet, reportedly due to his presence on stage during Rajinikanth's speech and his failure to distance himself from the actor's comments.

According to the documentary "RMV: The King Maker," Rajinikanth later expressed regret over the incident's impact on Veerappan's political career.
