= Rajathi Kunchithapatham =

Indian politician

Rajathi Kunchithapatham was an Indian politician and former Member of the Legislative Assembly. She was elected to the Tamil Nadu legislative assembly as an Indian National Congress candidate from Tirunelveli constituency in 1957 and 1962 elections. She was one of the two winners in 1957 election, the other winner was Somasundaram. She lost the 1971 election to P. Padmanabhan in the same constituency by 16, 952 votes.
