= V. R. Nedunchezhiyan =

Indian politician and writer (1920–2000)

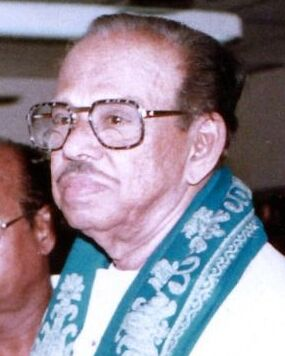

1st Acting Chief Minister of Tamil Nadu
- In office 24 December 1987 – 7 January 1988
- Governor: Sundar Lal Khurana
- Political Party: All India Anna Dravida Munnetra Kazhagam
- Preceded by: M. G. Ramachandran
- Succeeded by: V. N. Janaki Ramachandran
- Constituency: Athoor
- In office 3 February 1969 – 10 February 1969
- Governor: Sardar Ujjal Singh
- Political Party: Dravida Munnetra Kazhagam
- Preceded by: C. N. Annadurai
- Succeeded by: M. Karunanidhi
- Constituency: Triplicane

Minister of Finance, Tamil Nadu
- In office 24 June 1991 – 12 May 1996
- Chief Minister: J. Jayalalithaa
- Preceded by: M. Karunanidhi
- Succeeded by: M. Karunanidhi
- In office 9 June 1980 – 24 December 1987
- Chief Minister: M. G. Ramachandran
- Preceded by: Nanjil K. Manoharan
- Succeeded by: M. Karunanidhi

Minister of Education, Tamil Nadu
- In office 13 August 1969 – 31 January 1976
- Chief Minister: M. Karunanidhi
- Preceded by: S. Madhavan
- Succeeded by: C. Aranganayagam
- In office 6 March 1967 – 10 February 1969
- Chief Minister: C. N. Annadurai himself (acting)
- Preceded by: M. Bhaktavatsalam
- Succeeded by: M. Karunanidhi

4th Leader of the Opposition in the Madras Legislative Assembly
- In office 29 March 1962 – 28 February 1967
- Deputy: M. Karunanidhi
- Chief Minister: K. Kamaraj; M. Bhakthavatsalam
- Preceded by: V. K. Ramaswami
- Succeeded by: P. G. Karuthiruman
- Constituency: Triplicane

Member of Tamil Nadu Legislative Assembly
- In office 1991–1996
- Leader of the House: Himself
- Preceded by: G. Ponnu Pillai
- Succeeded by: N. R. Alagaraja
- Constituency: Theni
- In office 1984–1989
- Leader of the House: Himself
- Preceded by: A. Vellaisamy
- Succeeded by: I. Periyasamy
- Constituency: Athoor
- In office 1980–1984
- Leader of the House: Himself
- Preceded by: G. R. Edmund
- Succeeded by: S. Narayanan
- Constituency: Thirunelveli
- In office 1962–1977
- Leader of the House: B. Bakshatvalasam; Himself; M. Karunanidhi
- Preceded by: K. S. G. Haja Shareef
- Succeeded by: M. Aranganathan
- Constituency: Triplicane

2nd General Secretary of the All India Anna Dravida Munnetra Kazhagam
- In office 23 June 1978 – 10 June 1980
- Preceded by: M. G. Ramachandran
- Succeeded by: P. U. Shanmugam
- In office September 1977 - 23 June 1978; Interim
- General Secretary.: M. G. Ramachandran

2nd General Secretary of the Dravida Munnetra Kazhagam
- In office 4 February 1969 – 16 May 1977
- President: M. Karunanidhi
- Preceded by: C. N. Annadurai
- Succeeded by: K. Anbazhagan
- In office 24 April 1955 – 24 September 1960
- President: Vacant
- Preceded by: C. N. Annadurai
- Succeeded by: C. N. Annadurai

2nd Presidium Chairperson of DMK
- In office 1963–1969
- General Secretary: C. N. Annadurai
- Preceded by: E. V. K. Sampath
- Succeeded by: Karunanidhi as party president

Personal details
- Born: Ra. Go. Narayanasamy; 11 July 1920 Thirukannapuram, Madras Presidency, British India (present-day Tamil Nadu, India)
- Died: 12 January 2000 (aged 79) Chennai, Tamil Nadu, India
- Cause of death: Heart failure
- Party: All India Anna Dravida Munnetra Kazhagam (1977-2000)
- Other political affiliations: Dravidar Kazhagam (1944-1949); Dravida Munnetra Kazhagam (1949-1977); Makkal Dravida Munnetra Kazhagam (own party;1977)
- Spouse(s): Visalakshi (m. 1950; d. 2016)
- Children: 1 son
- Relatives: Jeevan Nedunchezhiyan (grandson)
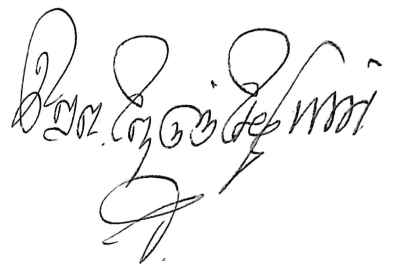
- Signature

Vadakkalathur Rajagopal Nedunchezhiyan (11 July 1920 – 12 January 2000) was an Indian politician and writer. He served twice as the acting Chief Minister of the state of Tamil Nadu, India. He served as a senior cabinet minister under the governments of C. N. Annadurai, M. Karunanidhi, M. G. Ramachandran and J. Jayalalithaa. For his literary contributions, he was also known as "Navalar" or the eloquent.

== Life and career ==
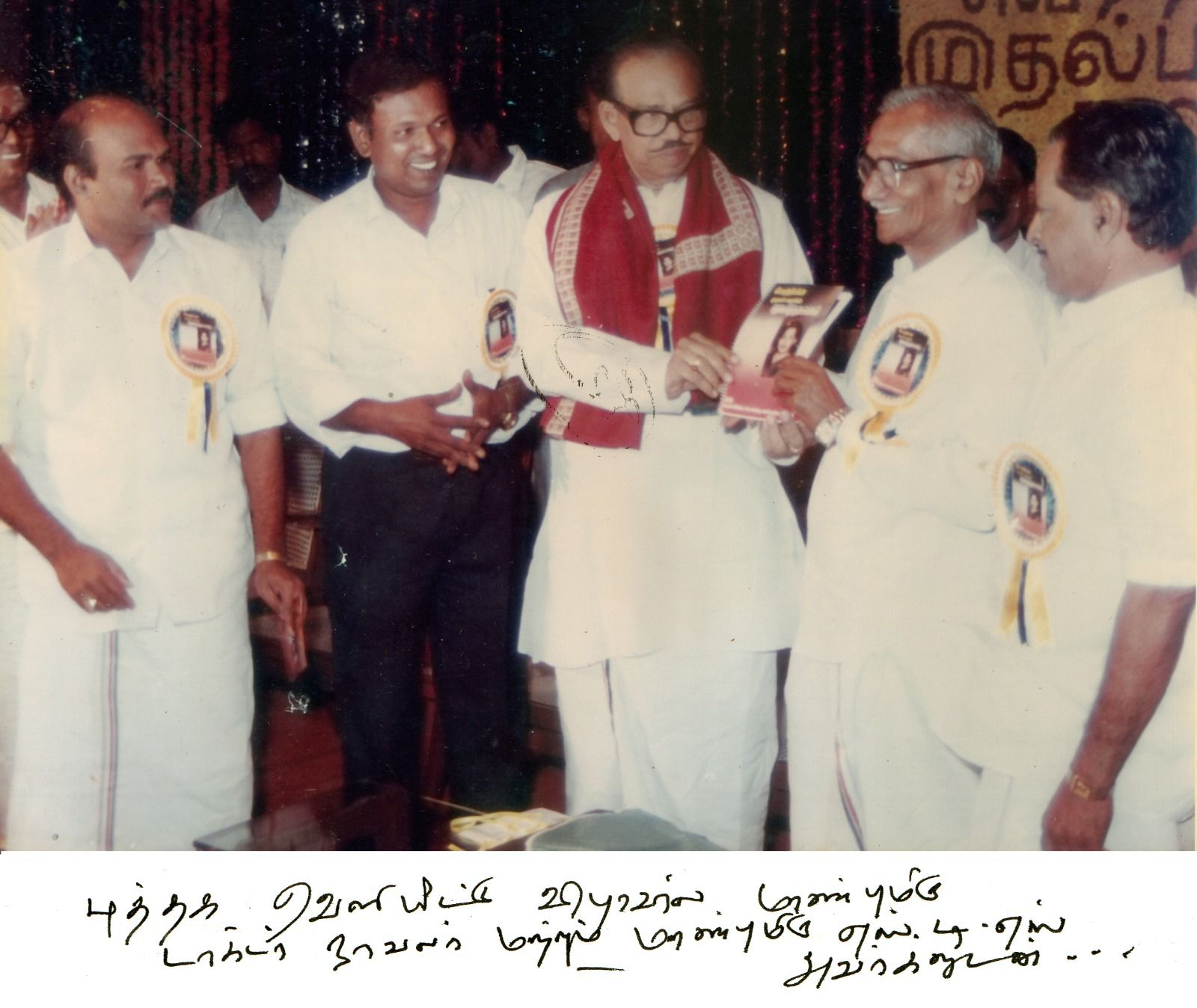
Nedunchezhiyan at a book release event

Nedunchezhiyan was born at Thirukannapuram on 11 July 1920. He graduated with a master's degree and a doctorate in Tamil literature from Annamalai University. He became involved in politics while at the university and joined the Dravidar Kazhagam party in 1944. In 1949, C. N. Annadurai formed the Dravida Munnetra Kazhagam (DMK), and Nedunchezhiyen joined the party, acting as deputy general secretary until 1955. He was general secretary between 1955 and 1960 and then chairman of the party's general council until 1969.

Nedunchezhiyan was elected to the Legislative Assembly of Tamil Nadu in 1962. In 1967, he became the Minister of Education when the Dravida Munnetra Kazhagam took power. He was briefly acting Chief Minister for the state following C. N. Annadurai's death in 1969, taking the role until M. Karunanidhi was appointed.He then continued as a cabinet minister in the Karunanidhi cabinet until the DMK government was dissolved in 1976.

Together with K. Rajaram, Nedunchezhiyan left the DMK to form a new political party called the Makkal Dravida Munnetra Kazhagam, but it did not last long. The party merged with the All India Anna Dravida Munnetra Kazhagam (AIADMK), which was in power by then, in 1978 and from 1980 Nedunchezhiyan served as a Minister of Finance under the leadership of AIADMK's M. G. Ramachandran, until 1987. Nedunchezhiyan was a deputy general secretary of the AIADMK from 1977 and 1989, and became a general secretary in 1989. He became acting Chief Minister in 1988 when Ramachandran died.

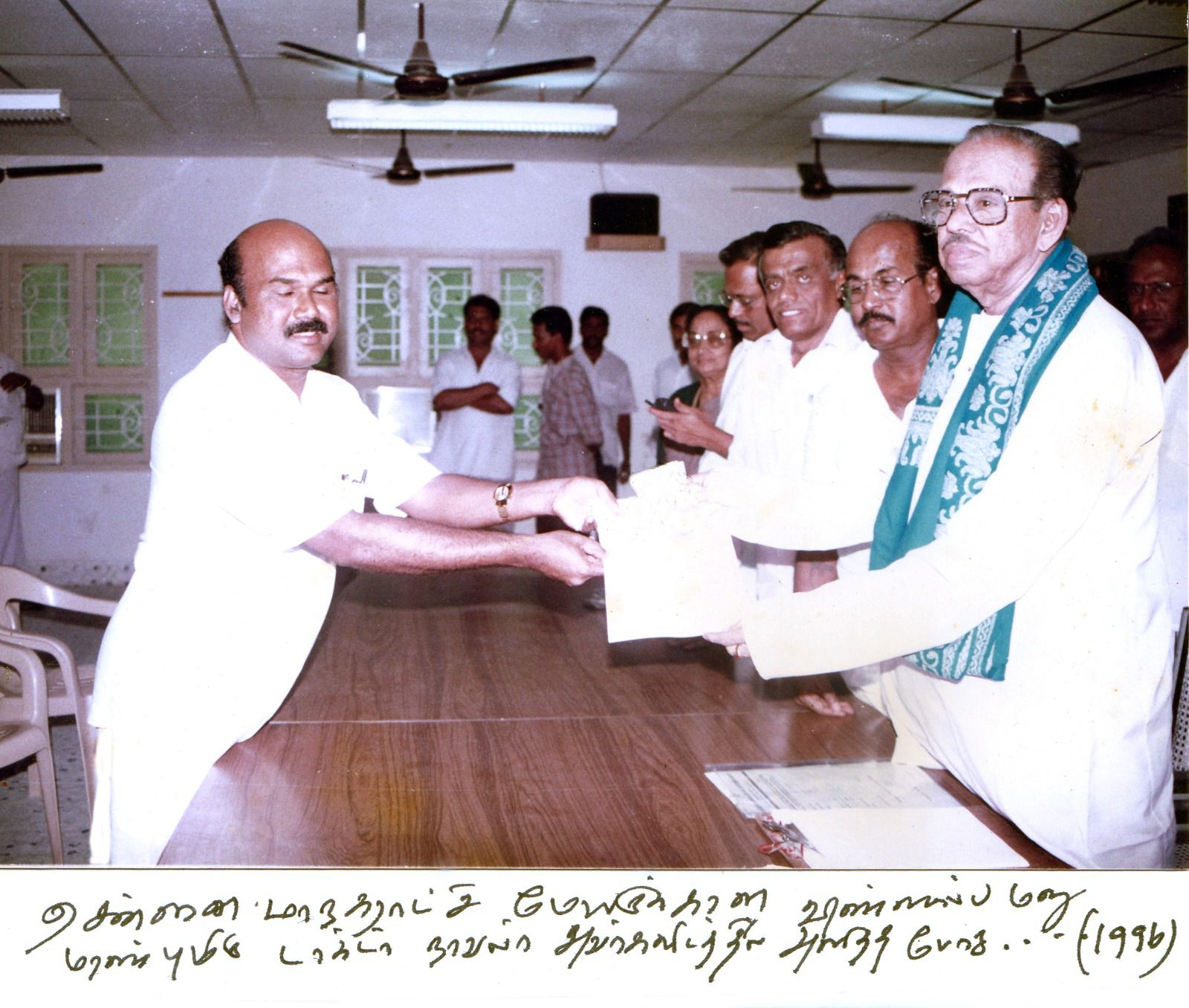
Nedunchezhiyan at AIADMK headquarters in 1996, ahead of local body elections

Nedunchezhiyan briefly aligned himself with the J. Jayalalithaa-led faction within the AIADMK but was expelled from the party in 1988 after disputes with its leaders. He contested the 1989 state elections and later that year rejoined the party fold after Jayalalithaa had successfully reunified it. He then served as Minister of Finance again between 1991 and 1996. Later, he served as General Council Leader Of the AIADMK from 1996 until his death.

== Personal life ==
He married his wife, Visalakshi (died 2016) (AIADMK Spokesperson), in 1950, and they had one son.

Indian tennis player Jeevan Nedunchezhiyan is his grandson.

== Death ==
He died of heart failure at Apollo Hospital on 12 January 2000. Nedunchezhiyan's body was cremated at Besant Nagar cemetery.

== In popular culture ==
The character Madhivanan, played by Rajesh, in the 1997 film Iruvar is loosely based on Nedunchezhiyan.

== Books published ==
Nedunchezhiyan was a prolific writer in Tamil literature, authoring numerous books and booklets on politics, culture, and social issues. His notable works include:

=== Political and social commentary ===
- Mozhi Poraattam (Language Struggle) (1948) - A book on the anti-Hindi agitation
- DMK (1961) - About the Dravida Munnetra Kazhagam party
- Samuthaya Viduthalai (Societal Liberation)
- History of the Dravidian Movement (Part I) (1996)
- War of Social Justice (1996)

=== Literary and cultural works ===
- Ezhuchi Murasu (Rising Drum)
- Puthiya Paathai (New Path)
- Purananooru Katchikal (Scenes from Purananooru)
- Kalithohai Kanda Kathal Kaatchigal (Love scenes from Kalithohai)
- Thirukkural - Novel Clarification (1991) - A commentary on the classic Tamil text Thirukkural

=== Historical and philosophical works ===
- Pandaiya Greykkam (Ancient Greece) (1953) - Inspired by the social and political conditions of ancient Greece
- Mooda Nambikkai (False Beliefs)
- Religion and Superstition (1955)

=== Biographies ===
- Biography of Revolutionary Bharatidasan (1994)
- Vadakkalathur Raja Gopalanar Biography (1991)

=== Autobiography ===
- Vaazhvil Naan Kandathum Kettathum (What I Saw and Heard in Life) (2000) - His autobiography

Nedunchezhiyan also ran a Tamil journal called Mandram with his younger sibling Chezhiyan during his early career. His works contributed significantly to Tamil literature and the intellectual discourse of the Dravidian movement.

== Electoral career ==
=== Legislative Assembly elections contested ===
Elections	Constituency	Party	Result	Vote percentage	Opposition Candidate	Opposition Party	Opposition vote percentage
1957	Salem - I	Independent	Lost	44.83	A. Mariappan Mudaliar	INC	45.21
1962	Triplicane	DMK	Won	51.29	Sivanesan	INC	35.31
1967	Triplicane	DMK	Won	59.41	M. S. Sammandappa	INC	39.93
1971	Triplicane	DMK	Won	50.40	K. Vinayakam	INC	48.95
1980	Tirunelveli	AIADMK	Won	57.96	Rajathi Kunchithapatham	INC	40.94
1984	Athoor	AIADMK	Won	63.16	Rajambal K	DMK	35.35
1989	Mylapore	Independent	Lost	0.5	N. Ganapathy	DMK	40.88
1991	Theni	AIADMK	Won	61.5	L.S.R. Krishnan	DMK	24.0
1996	Theni	AIADMK	Lost	22.97	Alagaraja.N.R	TMC(M)	62.76

== See also ==
- First Nedunchezhiyan ministry
- Second Nedunchezhiyan ministry
- Pleasant Stay hotel case
