= A. L. S. Lakshmanan =

Indian politician

A. L. Subramanian Lakshmanan is an Indian politician who was elected to the Tamil Nadu Legislative Assembly in the 2016 elections from the Tirunelveli constituency. He was a candidate of the Dravida Munnetra Kazhagam party and won the seat from the incumbent, Nainar Nagendran, by 601 votes. The result overturned the outcome of the 2011 contest for the seat, when Nagendran had won by over 38,000 votes.

Lakshmanan's father was A. L. Subramanian, who himself was elected as Member of the Legislative Assembly for the Tirunelveli constituency on three occasions.
