= Tirunelveli Assembly constituency =

One of the 234 State Legislative Assembly Constituencies in Tamil Nadu

Coordinates: 8.73°N 77.75°E

Tirunelveli constituency
- Constituency No. 224 for the Tamil Nadu Legislative Assembly

Constituency details
- Country: India
- Region: South India
- State: Tamil Nadu
- District: Tirunelveli
- Lok Sabha constituency: Tirunelveli
- Established: 1951
- Total electors: 275,857

Member of Legislative Assembly
- 17th Tamil Nadu Legislative Assembly
- Incumbent R. S. Murughan
- Party: TVK
- Alliance: TVK+
- Elected year: 2026

Tirunelveli Assembly constituency is located in Tirunelveli Lok Sabha Constituency in Tamil Nadu. It is one of the oldest assembly segments in Tamil Nadu, being in existence since independence. Tirunelveli was one of 17 Assembly constituencies to have VVPAT facility with EVMs in the 2016 Tamil Nadu Legislative Assembly election. Tirunelveli voted for the party that formed the government in the state except for 2016 and 2021. It is one of the 234 State Legislative Assembly Constituencies in Tamil Nadu.

== Members of Legislative Assembly ==
=== Madras State ===
Year	Winner	Party
1952	Arumugam; S. N. Somayajulu	Indian National Congress
1957	Rajathi Kunjithapatham; M. K. Somasundaram	Indian National Congress
1962	Rajathi Kunjithapatham	Indian National Congress
1967	A. L. Subramanian	Dravida Munnetra Kazhagam

=== Tamil Nadu ===
Year	Winner	Party
1971	P. Padmanabhan	Dravida Munnetra Kazhagam
1977	G. R. Edmund	All India Anna Dravida Munnetra Kazhagam
1980	V. R. Nedunchezhiyan	All India Anna Dravida Munnetra Kazhagam
1984	S. Narayanan	All India Anna Dravida Munnetra Kazhagam
1986	R. M. Veerappan	All India Anna Dravida Munnetra Kazhagam
1989	A. L. Subramanian	Dravida Munnetra Kazhagam
1991	D. Veliah Thevar	All India Anna Dravida Munnetra Kazhagam
1996	A. L. Subramanian	Dravida Munnetra Kazhagam
2001	Nainar Nagendran	All India Anna Dravida Munnetra Kazhagam
2006	N. Malai Raja	Dravida Munnetra Kazhagam
2011	Nainar Nagendran	All India Anna Dravida Munnetra Kazhagam
2016	A. L. S. Lakshmanan	Dravida Munnetra Kazhagam
2021	Nainar Nagendran	Bharatiya Janata Party
2026	R. S. Murughan	Tamilaga Vettri Kazhagam

== Election results ==
Vote share of winning candidates
2026	34.72%
2021	46.70%
2016	43.13%
2011	54.81%
2006	45.85%
2001	40.93%
1996	52.48%
1991	62.81%
1989	35.55%
1984	59.57%
1980	57.96%
1977	38.50%
1971	62.16%
1967	61.74%
1962	36.89%
1957	27.25%
1952	23.55%

=== 2026 ===
2026 Tamil Nadu Legislative Assembly election: Tirunelveli
Party	Candidate	Votes	%	±%
TVK	R. S. Murughan	75,840	34.72	New
DMK	S. Subramanian	64,426	29.50	▼5.88
AIADMK	Thachai Ganesaraja	47,504	21.75	New
PT	Dr. Shyam Krishnasamy	10,634	4.87	New
NOTA	None of the above	717	0.33	▼0.74
Margin of victory		11,414	5.22	▼6.60
Turnout		2,18,425	79.05	▲12.19
Registered electors		275,857		▼16,115
TVK gain from BJP		Swing	▲34.72	

=== 2021 ===
2021 Tamil Nadu Legislative Assembly election: Tirunelveli
Party	Candidate	Votes	%	±%
BJP	Nainar Nagendran	92,282	47.20	+44.03
DMK	A. L. S. Lakshmanan	69,175	35.38	−7.74
AMMK	A. P. Mahesh Kannan	8,911	4.56	New
NOTA	NOTA	2,091	1.07	−0.1
Independent	M. Sivakumar	1,412	0.72	New
Independent	Srithar Rajan	1,342	0.69	New
Margin of victory		23,107	11.82	11.50
Turnout		195,496	66.86	−3.63
Registered electors		292,411		
BJP gain from DMK		Swing	4.08	

=== 2016 ===
2016 Tamil Nadu Legislative Assembly election: Tirunelveli
Party	Candidate	Votes	%	±%
DMK	A. L. S. Lakshmanan	81,761	43.13	+12.79
AIADMK	Nainar Nagendran	81,160	42.81	−12.00
DMDK	S. Madasamy	8,640	4.56	New
BJP	A. Maharajan	6,017	3.17	+2.02
NOTA	NOTA	2,218	1.17	New
Independent	G. Velammal	2,029	1.07	New
PMK	Ganesan Kannan	1,884	0.99	New
Independent	P. Rajkumar	1,377	0.73	New
Margin of victory		601	0.32	−24.15
Turnout		189,576	70.48	−6.20
Registered electors		268,968		
DMK gain from AIADMK		Swing	-11.68	

=== 2011 ===
2011 Tamil Nadu Legislative Assembly election: Tirunelveli
Party	Candidate	Votes	%	±%
AIADMK	Nainar Nagendran	86,220	54.81	+9.39
DMK	A. L. S. Lakshmanan	47,729	30.34	−15.50
JMM	G. Velammal	7,771	4.94	New
Independent	C. Pasupathipandian	4,307	2.74	New
IJK	S. Madhan	2,696	1.71	New
BJP	G. Murugadhas	1,815	1.15	−0.43
Independent	M. Subramanian	1,200	0.76	New
Independent	P. Ramakrishnan	975	0.62	New
Independent	K. Vedantham	969	0.62	New
Independent	C. Madasamy	814	0.52	New
Margin of victory		38,491	24.47	24.05
Turnout		157,304	76.68	4.62
Registered electors		205,146		
AIADMK gain from DMK		Swing	8.97	

=== 2006 ===
2006 Tamil Nadu Legislative Assembly election: Tirunelveli
Party	Candidate	Votes	%	±%
DMK	N. Malai Raja	65,517	45.85	+5.61
AIADMK	Nainar Nagendran	64,911	45.42	+4.49
Independent	S. Jayachandran	4,080	2.85	New
AIFB	S. Nambirajan	2,709	1.90	New
BJP	K. M. Sivakumar	2,257	1.58	New
BSP	A. Jeyakumar	1,406	0.98	New
Margin of victory		606	0.42	−0.27
Turnout		142,908	72.06	18.94
Registered electors		198,312		
DMK gain from AIADMK		Swing	4.92	

=== 2001 ===
2001 Tamil Nadu Legislative Assembly election: Tirunelveli
Party	Candidate	Votes	%	±%
AIADMK	Nainar Nagendran	42,765	40.93	+8.88
DMK	A. L. Subramanian	42,043	40.24	−12.24
SP	S. Saravanaperumal	11,025	10.55	New
MDMK	R. Shanmugasundaram	4,980	4.77	−3.38
Independent	P. Jabarullakhan	1,595	1.53	New
CPI(ML)L	T. Sankarapandian	782	0.75	New
Margin of victory		722	0.69	−19.74
Turnout		104,492	53.12	−15.81
Registered electors		196,785		
AIADMK gain from DMK		Swing	-11.55	

=== 1996 ===
1996 Tamil Nadu Legislative Assembly election: Tirunelveli
Party	Candidate	Votes	%	±%
DMK	A. L. Subramanian	59,914	52.48	+19.8
AIADMK	V. Karuppasamy Pandian	36,590	32.05	−30.76
MDMK	M. Achiyur Mani	9,295	8.14	New
PMK	P. Perumal	3,141	2.75	New
BJP	Su. Chidambaram	2,171	1.90	New
JP	P. Kalaivanan	1,661	1.45	New
Margin of victory		23,324	20.43	−9.70
Turnout		114,165	68.93	7.04
Registered electors		170,499		
DMK gain from AIADMK		Swing	-10.33	

=== 1991 ===
1991 Tamil Nadu Legislative Assembly election: Tirunelveli
Party	Candidate	Votes	%	±%
AIADMK	D. Veliah	63,138	62.81	+39.11
DMK	A. L. Subramanian	32,853	32.68	−2.87
Independent	M. Thandayuthapani	1,874	1.86	New
PMK	C. Nellaiappan	1,803	1.79	New
Margin of victory		30,285	30.13	21.22
Turnout		100,516	61.90	−10.73
Registered electors		165,240		
AIADMK gain from DMK		Swing	27.26	

=== 1989 ===
1989 Tamil Nadu Legislative Assembly election: Tirunelveli
Party	Candidate	Votes	%	±%
DMK	A. L. Subramanian	37,991	35.55	−4.1
INC	N. S. S. Nellai Kannan	28,470	26.64	New
AIADMK	V. Masana Moorthy	25,332	23.71	−35.87
AIADMK	K. Muthusamy	12,201	11.42	−48.16
Independent	G. Gaspar Raja	1,513	1.42	New
Margin of victory		9,521	8.91	−11.01
Turnout		106,862	72.63	−2.64
Registered electors		149,539		
DMK gain from AIADMK		Swing	-24.02	

=== 1984 ===
1984 Tamil Nadu Legislative Assembly election: Tirunelveli
Party	Candidate	Votes	%	±%
AIADMK	S. Narayanan	56,409	59.57	+1.61
DMK	A. L. Subramanian	37,547	39.65	New
Margin of victory		18,862	19.92	2.90
Turnout		94,687	75.27	5.47
Registered electors		129,277		
AIADMK hold		Swing	1.61	

=== 1980 ===
1980 Tamil Nadu Legislative Assembly election: Tirunelveli
Party	Candidate	Votes	%	±%
AIADMK	V. R. Nedunchezhiyan	48,338	57.96	+19.46
INC	Rajathi Kunchithapatham	34,142	40.94	+13.07
Independent	Pandian	613	0.74	New
Margin of victory		14,196	17.02	6.39
Turnout		83,394	69.79	10.30
Registered electors		120,570		
AIADMK hold		Swing	19.46	

=== 1977 ===
1977 Tamil Nadu Legislative Assembly election: Tirunelveli
Party	Candidate	Votes	%	±%
AIADMK	G. R. Edmund	26,419	38.50	New
INC	Krishnan Alias Nellai Kannan	19,125	27.87	−9.97
JP	R. Servaikaren Subbiah	8,244	12.01	New
DMK	E. Nambi	8,199	11.95	−50.21
Independent	M. Abdul Majeed	6,090	8.87	New
Independent	E. Hariramakrishnan	545	0.79	New
Margin of victory		7,294	10.63	−13.69
Turnout		68,622	59.49	−10.60
Registered electors		116,395		
AIADMK gain from DMK		Swing	-23.66	

=== 1971 ===
1971 Tamil Nadu Legislative Assembly election: Tirunelveli
Party	Candidate	Votes	%	±%
DMK	P. Padmanabhan	43,325	62.16	+0.42
INC	Rajathi Kunchithapatham	26,373	37.84	+0.19
Margin of victory		16,952	24.32	0.24
Turnout		69,698	70.10	−6.74
Registered electors		103,204		
DMK hold		Swing	0.42	

=== 1967 ===
1967 Madras Legislative Assembly election: Tirunelveli
Party	Candidate	Votes	%	±%
DMK	A. L. Subramanian	41,589	61.74	New
INC	M. S. M. Pillai	25,364	37.65	+0.76
Independent	M. K. R. Iyenger	409	0.61	New
Margin of victory		16,225	24.09	22.04
Turnout		67,362	76.84	2.40
Registered electors		89,938		
DMK gain from INC		Swing	24.84	

=== 1962 ===
1962 Madras Legislative Assembly election: Tirunelveli
Party	Candidate	Votes	%	±%
INC	Rajathi Kunjithapatham	25,985	36.89	+9.64
SWA	Ramasami (Sundaram)	24,544	34.85	New
IUML	Ahmed Ibrahim	18,091	25.69	New
PSP	Muthiah Pillai	809	1.15	New
Independent	S. Rajagopalachari	702	1.00	New
Margin of victory		1,441	2.05	−4.40
Turnout		70,430	74.44	−7.61
Registered electors		96,617		
INC hold		Swing	9.64	

=== 1957 ===
1957 Madras Legislative Assembly election: Tirunelveli
Party	Candidate	Votes	%	±%
INC	Rajathi Kunjithapatham	38,839	27.25	+3.7
INC	Somasundaram	29,648	20.80	−2.75
Independent	Kandish	16,886	11.85	New
PSP	Mohammaed Ismail Rowther	15,695	11.01	New
PSP	Ponnusami (Sc)	12,388	8.69	New
Independent	Esakimuthu (Sc)	7,834	5.50	New
Independent	Jacob	4,834	3.39	New
Independent	Chelliah (Sc)	4,822	3.38	New
Independent	Sankarasubramania Iyer	2,791	1.96	New
Independent	Sundaram	2,781	1.95	New
Independent	Kannappa Pillai	2,760	1.94	New
Margin of victory		9,191	6.45	2.56
Turnout		142,516	82.05	−14.91
Registered electors		173,695		
INC hold		Swing	3.70	

=== 1952 ===
1952 Madras Legislative Assembly election: Tirunelveli
Party	Candidate	Votes	%	±%
INC	Arumugam	32,529	23.55	New
INC	S. N. Somayajulu	27,156	19.66	New
Independent	P. S. Subramania Pillai	20,470	14.82	New
CPI	Shammaguam	19,315	13.98	New
Independent	Kankaraj	16,604	12.02	New
Socialist Party (India)	Nadarajan Alias Mangala Ponnambalam	10,458	7.57	New
KMPP	Subramanian	5,857	4.24	New
Independent	Muthiah	3,198	2.32	New
Independent	Sethuramalingam Pillai	2,550	1.85	New
Margin of victory		5,373	3.89	
Turnout		138,137	96.96	
Registered electors		142,467		
INC win (new seat)				
