= Neil Statue Satyagraha =

Agitation in Madras Presidency, British India

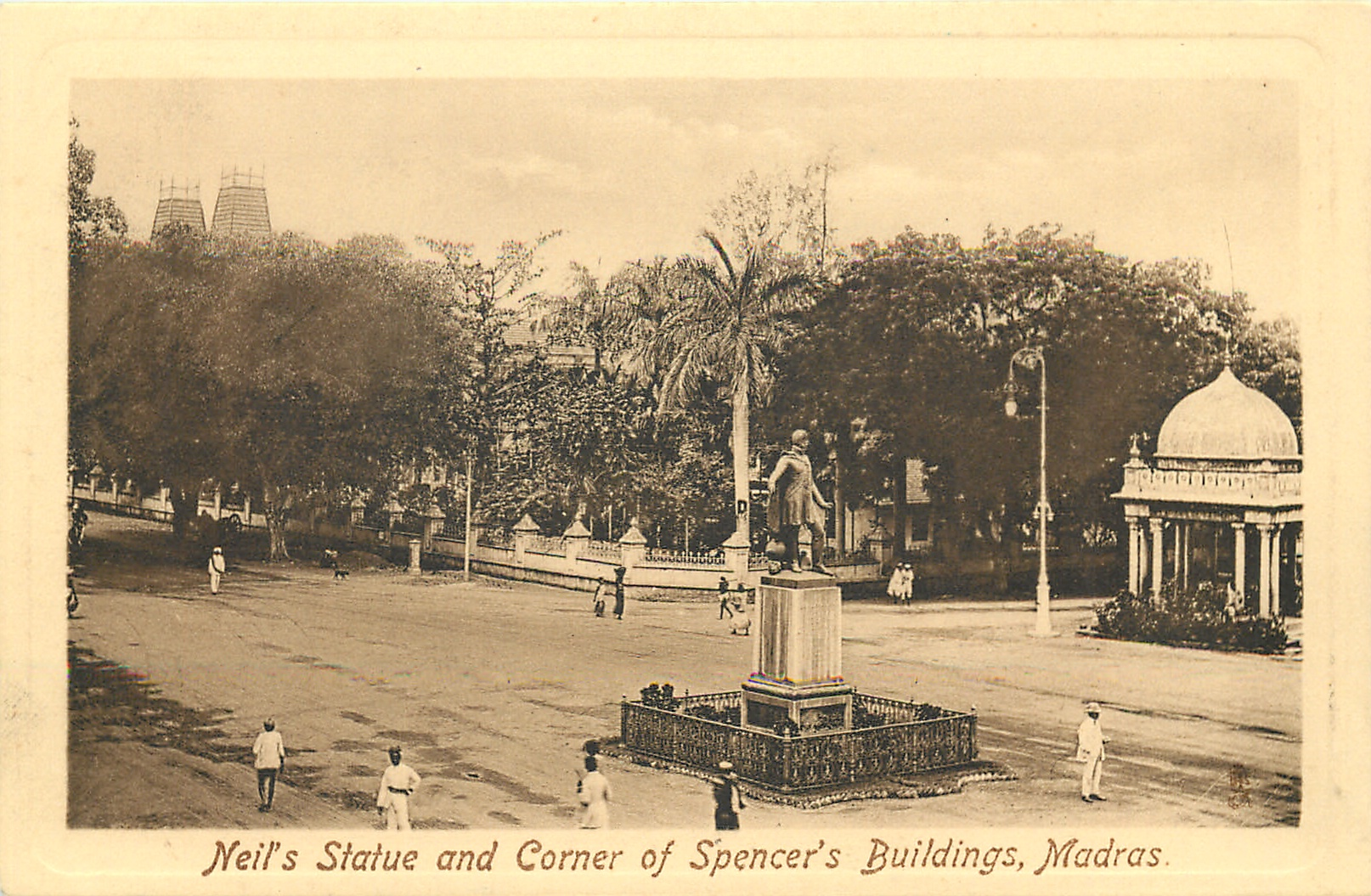
Neil's Statue, and corner of Spencer's Buildings in Madras, ca. 1900

The Neill Statue satyagraha was an agitation that took place in Madras in 1927, during the Indian Independence Movement. It demanded the removal of the statue of Colonel James Neill on Mount Road (now Anna Salai).

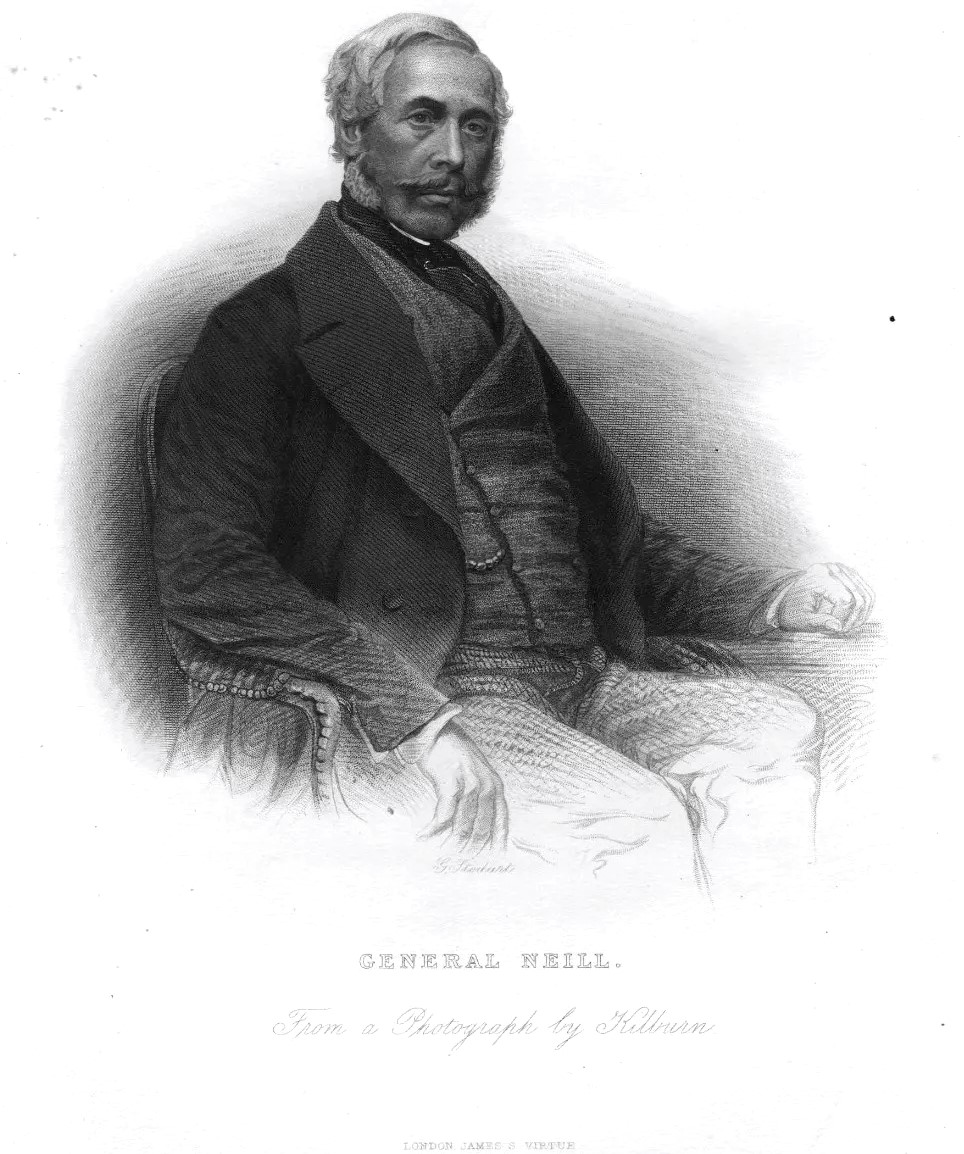
James George Smith Neill (26 May 1810 – 25 September 1857)

James Neill of the Madras Fusiliers regiment played a major role in putting down the Indian Rebellion of 1857. He was killed during the siege of Lucknow and was reviled as the "Butcher of Allahabad" by the Indians. A statue of him was placed at Mount Road, Madras. In 1927, it became a target for Indian nationalists. The Madras Mahajana Sabha and the Madras provincial committee of the Indian National Congress passed a resolution demanding its removal. They started a series of demonstrations in Madras. The agitators came from all over the Madras Presidency and were led by S. N. Somayajulu of Tirunelveli. Several agitators were arrested and sentenced to prison terms ranging from a few weeks to a year of rigorous imprisonment. After the major leaders - Somayajulu and Swaminatha Mudaliar were arrested, K. Kamaraj became the leader of the agitation (September 1927). Mahatma Gandhi who visited Madras during the same time, gave his support to the agitation. The Madras legislature also passed resolutions demanding the removal of the statue. The agitation lost steam after a few months and was dropped to make way for the Simon Commission boycott.

Neill's statue remained in the same place and was moved to the Ripon Building campus for a few years. In 1937, when the newly elected Congress government (under the 1935 act) of C. Rajagopalachari moved it to the Madras museum after a resolution demanding its removal was passed in the Madras Corporation. As of 2021, it still remains in the Anthropology section of the museum.
