= Arumugam (Tirunelveli MLA) =

Indian politician

R. S. Arumugam

Member of the Madras State Assembly
- In office 1952–1957
- Constituency: Tirunelveli

Personal details
- Party: Indian National Congress

R. S. Arumugam was an Indian politician and former Member of the Legislative Assembly. He was elected to the Tamil Nadu legislative assembly as an Indian National Congress candidate from Tirunelveli constituency in 1952 election. He was one of the victors from the constituency, the other being Somayajulu.
