= N. Malai Raja =

Indian politician

N. Maalai Raja is an Indian politician and was previously a Member of the Legislative Assembly. He was elected to the Tamil Nadu Legislative Assembly as a Dravida Munnetra Kazhagam candidate from Tirunelveli constituency in 2006 election.
