= Kanni Penn =

1969 film by A. Kasilingam

- Theatrical release poster
- Directed by: A. Kasilingam
- Screenplay by: R. M. Veerappan
- Story by: R. M. Veerappan; S. Jagadeesan; Vidwan V. Lakshman
- Produced by: R. M. Veerappan
- Starring: Jaishankar; Vanisri; Lakshmi
- Cinematography: Vijayan
- Edited by: S. Natrajan
- Music by: M. S. Viswanathan
- Production company: Sathya Movies
- Release date: 11 September 1969
- Country: India
- Language: Tamil

Kanni Penn (transl. Virgin girl) is a 1969 Indian Tamil-language film directed by A. Kasilingam and produced by R. M. Veerappan. The film stars Jaishankar, Vanisri and Lakshmi. It was released on 11 September 1969. The story follows the usual 1960s Tamil cinema family dynamics, focusing heavily on moral uprightness, upholding personal and family dignity against societal pressures, and overcoming deceptive elements in society.

== Plot ==
A young man comes across a crossroad in his life where he is forced to make a few important and difficult decisions.

== Cast ==
- Jaishankar
- Vanisri
- Lakshmi
- Sivakumar
- Vennira Aadai Nirmala
- Cho
- V. K. Ramasamy

== Production ==
Kanni Penn was directed by A. Kasilingam and produced by R. M. Veerappan under Sathya Movies. Cinematography was handled by Vijayan.

== Themes ==
The film attempts to project the ideals of C. N. Annadurai: duty, dignity and decency.

== Soundtrack ==
The soundtrack was composed by M. S. Viswanathan.

Track listing
No.	Title	Lyrics	Singer(s)	Length
1.	"Adi Yendi"	Vaali	P. Susheela, L. R. Eswari
2.	"Pournami Nilavil"	Vaali	S. P. Balasubrahmanyam, S. Janaki
3.	"Un Athaikku"	Vaali	T. M. Soundararajan, P. Susheela
4.	"Iraivan Enakkoru"	Alangudi Somu	T. M. Soundarrajan
5.	"Oli Piranthathu"	Avinasi Mani	T. M. Soundarrajan, L. R. Eswari

== Release and reception ==
Kanni Penn was released on 11 September 1969. The critic from The Indian Express criticised the film's length of 19 reels but wrote, "[Jaishankar] is getting acceptable as an actor. [Vanisri] as the girl in miserable circumstances gives a very good account of herself. In fact, she is the best in the movie."
