= R. S. Murughan =

Indian politician (born 1968)

R. Sudalaikannu Murughan (born 1968) is an Indian politician from Tamil Nadu. He is a member of the Tamil Nadu Legislative Assembly from Tirunelveli Assembly constituency in Tirunelveli district representing the Tamilaga Vettri Kazhagam.

== Early life ==
Murughan is from Palayamlottai, Tirunelveli district, Tamil Nadu. He is the son of Sudalaikannu. He studied at Government High School, North Vijayanarayanam and passed Class 8 in 1981. Later, he discontinued his studies. Both he and his wife are contractors of highways. He declared assets worth Rs.158 crore in his affidavit to the Election Commission of India.

== Career ==
Murughan became an MLA for the first time winning the 2026 Tamil Nadu Legislative Assembly election from Tirunelveli Assembly constituency representing the Tamilaga Vettri Kazhagam. He polled 75,840 votes and defeated his nearest rival, S. Subramanian of the Dravida Munnetra Kazhagam, by a margin of 11,414 votes.
