= P. Padmanabhan =

Indian politician

P. Padmanabhan was an Indian politician and Member of the Legislative Assembly. He was elected to the Tamil Nadu legislative assembly as a Dravida Munnetra Kazhagam candidate from Tirunelveli constituency in the 1971 election.
