= Somasundaram =

Somasundaram சோமசுந்தரம்
- Pronunciation: Cōmacuntaram
- Gender: Male
- Language: Tamil; Malayalam

Origin
- Region of origin: Southern India; Sri Lanka

Other names
- Alternative spelling: Somasundaran

Somasundaram or Somasundaran (Tamil: சோமசுந்தரம், romanized: Cōmacuntaram) is a male given name in South India and Sri Lanka. Due to the South Indian tradition of using patronymic surnames it may also be a surname for males and females.

== Notable people ==
=== Given name ===
- Kumaravel Somasundaram (born 1962), Indian cancer biologist, professor in the Indian Institute of Science
- Madurai S. Somasundaram (1919–1989), Carnatic music vocalist
- Mi. Pa. Somasundaram (1921–1999), Tamil journalist, poet, writer and musicologist
- S. D. Somasundaram (1930–2001), political leader and administrator, cabinet minister of the Tamil Nadu state
- V. Somasundaram, Indian politician, member of the Tamil Nadu Legislative Assembly

=== Surname ===
- Guru Somasundaram, Indian actor who works in the Tamil and Malayalam film industries
- Ponisseril Somasundaran (born 1939), American mineral engineer
- Pradip Somasundaran (born 1967), Indian playback singer
- Rajan Somasundaram, composer, drummer, violinist and music producer based in Raleigh
- Somasundaram Nadesan, QC (1904–1986), Sri Lankan Tamil lawyer, civil rights activist, member of the Senate of Ceylon
- Somasundaram Senathirajah (1942–2025), Sri Lankan politician, Member of Parliament

== See also ==
- 31600 Somasundaram, minor planet
