= A. L. Subramanian =

Indian politician (1940–2012)

A. L. Subramanian (5 September 1940 – 26 October 2012) was an Indian politician and former Member of the Legislative Assembly (MLA). He also served as the mayor of Tirunelveli Corporation during the period 2006 -2011.

Subbramanian was elected to the Tamil Nadu legislative assembly as a Dravida Munnetra Kazhagam (DMK) candidate from Tirunelveli constituency in the 1967, 1989 and 1996 elections. He and his wife had two sons, and two daughters.

Subramanian died, aged 73, on 27 October 2012. He also served as Mayor of Tirunelveli City. A lawyer by profession, he was a trustee of the Tuticorin Port Trust and Additional Central Government Standing Counsel.
