= G. R. Edmund =

Indian politician

G. R. Edmund (6 January 1931– 2 June 2013) was an Indian politician of the Dravida Munnetra Kazhagam and Member of the Tamil Nadu Legislative Assembly. He served as the Deputy Speaker of the Tamil Nadu Legislative Assembly from 1969 to 1971.

He joined Mr M.G. Ramachandran when he founded Anna Dravida Munnetra Kazhagam, in 1972. Mr Edmund served as a State Minister between 1977, and 1980 and held 6 portfolios, including: Food, Forest, and Fisheries departments. He also served as Special Representative of the Tamil Nadu Government at Delhi. He was also public prosecutor at Madras High Court.
