= Tamil Nadu Legislative Assembly =

Unicameral legislature of the Indian state of Tamil Nadu

- 17th Tamil Nadu Assembly

Type
- Type: Unicameral
- Term limits: 5 years

History
- Founded: 1 April 1957 (69 years ago)

Leadership
- Speaker: J. C. D. Prabhakar, TVK since 12 May 2026
- Deputy Speaker: M. Ravisankar, TVK since 12 May 2026
- Chief Minister: C. Joseph Vijay, TVK since 10 May 2026
- Leader of the House: K. A. Sengottaiyan, TVK since 11 May 2026
- Government Whip: R. Sabarinathan,TVK since 11 May 2026
- Leader of the Opposition: Udhayanidhi Stalin, DMK since 10 May 2026
- Deputy Leader of Opposition: K. N. Nehru, DMK since 10 May 2026

Structure
- Seats: 234
- Political groups: Government (122): SSJVA (117); TVK (108); INC (5); VCK (2); IUML (2); Confidence and supply (5): LF (4); CPI(M) (2); CPI (2); IND (1) (Note: Mannargudi MLA – S. Kamaraj has been expelled from the Amma Makkal Munnetra Kazhagam and is currently functioning as an independent.); Opposition (106): SPA (60); DMK (59) (Note: MDMK contested the election on the DMK symbol, resulting in two of its members being elected as DMK candidates. Following the MDMK's decision to break away from the DMK-led alliance, these two members refused to leave and continue to remain in the DMK.); DMDK (1); AIADMK+ (46); AIADMK (41); PMK (4); BJP (1); Vacant (6): Vacant (6) (Note: Perundurai (103); Karur (135); Tiruchirappalli East (141); Viralimalai (179); Ambasamudram (225); Kolathur (13))

Elections
- Voting system: First past the post
- First election: 27 March 1952
- Last election: 23 April 2026
- Next election: 2031

Meeting place
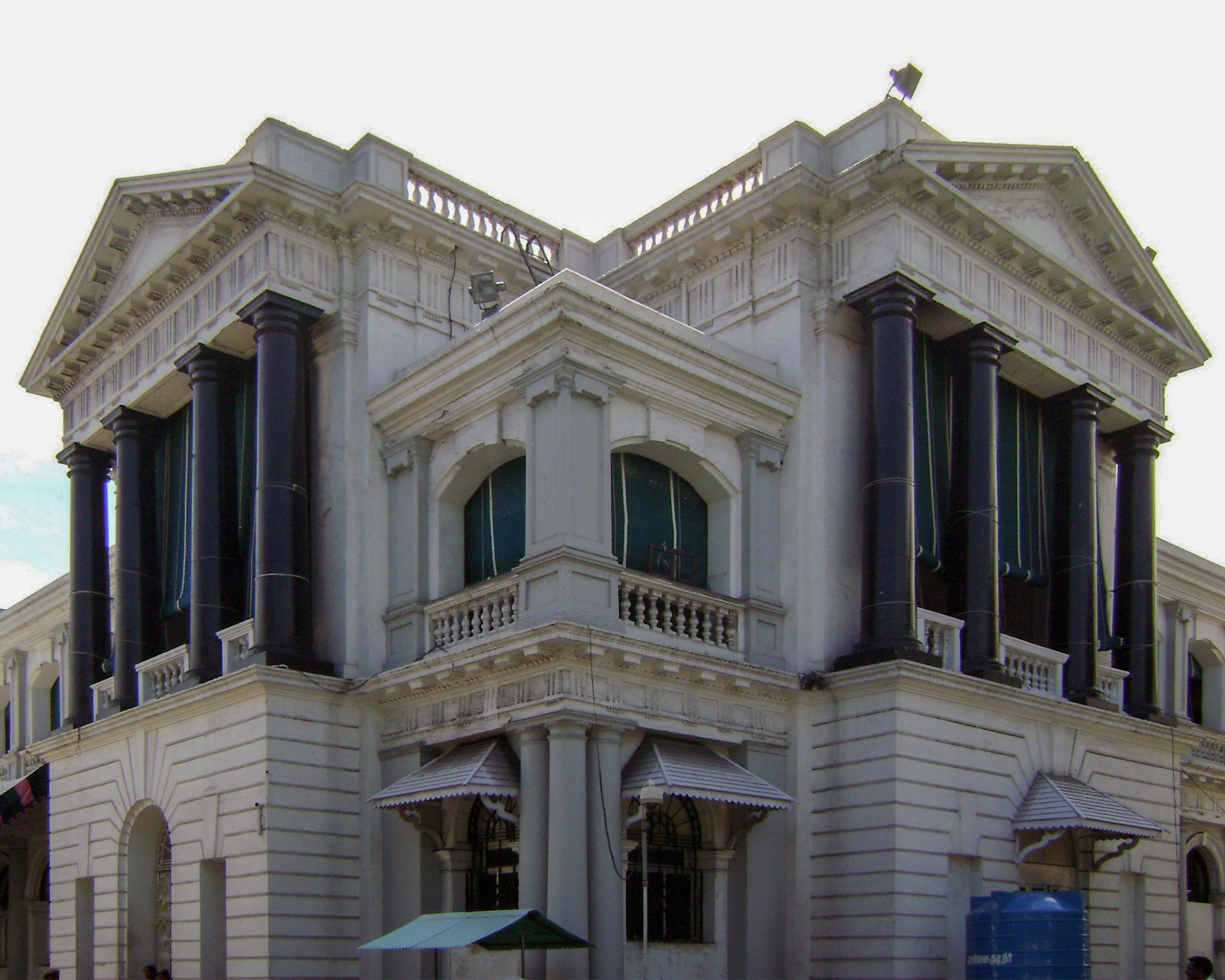
- 13.0796°N 80.2873°E; Chief Secretariat of Tamil Nadu, Chennai, Tamil Nadu

Website
- tnla.neva.gov.in assembly.tn.gov.in tnlasdigital.tn.gov.in/jspui

The Tamil Nadu Legislative Assembly is the unicameral legislature of the Indian state of Tamil Nadu. It has a strength of 234 members, all of whom are democratically elected using the first-past-the-post system. The presiding officer of the assembly is the Speaker. The term of the assembly is five years, unless dissolved earlier.

Since Tamil Nadu has a unicameral legislature, the terms Tamil Nadu Legislature and Tamil Nadu Legislative Assembly are almost synonymous and are often confused, though they are not the same. The Tamil Nadu Legislative Assembly, along with the Governor of Tamil Nadu, constitutes the legislature.

The present state of Tamil Nadu is a residuary part of the erstwhile Madras Presidency and was formerly known as Madras State. The first legislature of any sort for the Presidency was the Madras Legislative Council, which was set up as a non-representative advisory body in 1861. In 1919, direct elections were introduced with the introduction of diarchy under the Government of India Act 1919. Between 1920 and 1937, the Legislative Council was a unicameral legislature for the Madras Presidency. The Government of India Act 1935 abolished diarchy and created a bicameral legislature in the Madras Presidency. The Legislative Assembly became the Lower House of the Presidency.

After the Republic of India was established in 1950, the Madras Presidency became the Madras State, and the bicameral setup continued. The Madras State's assembly strength was 375, and the first assembly was constituted in 1952. The current state was formed in 1956 after the reorganisation of states, and the strength of the assembly was reduced to 206. Its strength was increased to the present 234 in 1965. Madras State was renamed Tamil Nadu in 1969, and subsequently, the assembly came to be called the Tamil Nadu Legislative Assembly. The Legislative Council was abolished in 1986, making the legislature a unicameral body and the assembly its sole chamber.

The present Seventeenth Legislative Assembly was constituted in May 2026. It was constituted after the 2026 Assembly election, which resulted in a hung assembly for the first time in the state's history, with no pre-poll alliance getting a majority. TVK became the single largest party in the assembly in their first contested election.

== History ==
=== Origin ===
The first legislature of any kind to be established in Madras was the Madras Legislative Council in 1861. First established as a non-representative advisory body, it saw the introduction of elected members in 1892. The Indian Councils Act 1909 (popularly called the "Minto-Morley Reforms") officially introduced indirect election of members to the council. In 1919, direct elections were introduced with the introduction of diarchy under the Government of India Act 1919. Between 1920 and 1937, the Legislative Council was a unicameral legislature for the Madras Presidency. The Government of India Act 1935 abolished diarchy and created a bicameral legislature in Madras province. The Legislature consisted of the Governor and two legislative bodies: a Legislative Assembly and a Legislative Council. The Assembly was the lower house and consisted of 215 members, who were further classified into general members and reserved members representing special communities and interests:

| Reservation | Number of members |
|---|---|
| Unreserved | 116 |
| Scheduled Castes | 30 |
| Muslims | 28 |
| Christians | 8 |
| Women | 8 |
| Landholders | 6 |
| Commerce and Industry | 6 |
| Labour and Trade Unions | 6 |
| Europeans | 3 |
| Anglo-Indians | 2 |
| University | 1 |
| Tribal | 1 |
| Total | 215 |

The presiding officer of the Assembly was called the Speaker of the Assembly.

=== Madras Presidency ===
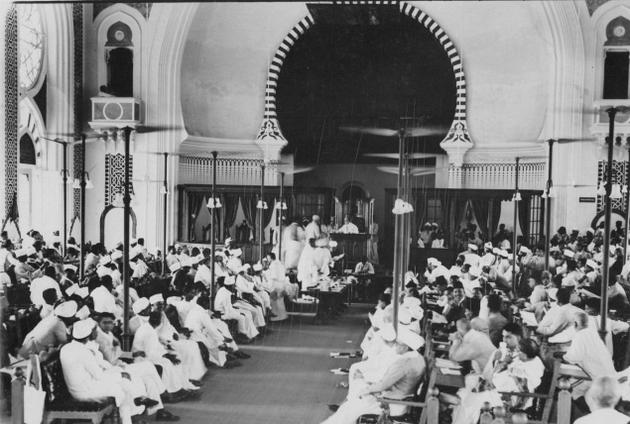
First Assembly of the Madras Presidency meeting in the Senate House, University of Madras (1937)

The first legislative assembly election in the presidency was held in February 1937. The Indian National Congress obtained a majority by winning 159 of 215 seats. C. Rajagopalachari became the first elected chief minister of the Presidency under the provincial autonomy system guaranteed by the Government of India Act 1935. The first assembly was constituted in July 1937. Bulusu Sambamurti and A. Rukmani Lakshmipathi were elected as the Speaker and Deputy Speaker respectively.

The first assembly lasted its term until February 1943, but the Congress cabinet resigned in October 1939, protesting India's participation in World War II. From 1939 to 1946, Madras was under the direct rule of the governor and no elections were held in 1943 when the assembly's term expired. Next elections were held only in 1946, when a political compromise was reached between the Congress and viceroy Lord Wavell. The second assembly of the presidency was constituted in April 1946 and J. Shivashanmugam Pillai was elected as the speaker. The Congress won an absolute majority in the elections and again formed the Government. On 15 August 1947, India became independent and the new Indian Constitution came into effect on 26 January 1950. Madras Presidency became Madras State and the existing assembly and government were retained till new elections could be held in 1951.

=== Republic of India ===
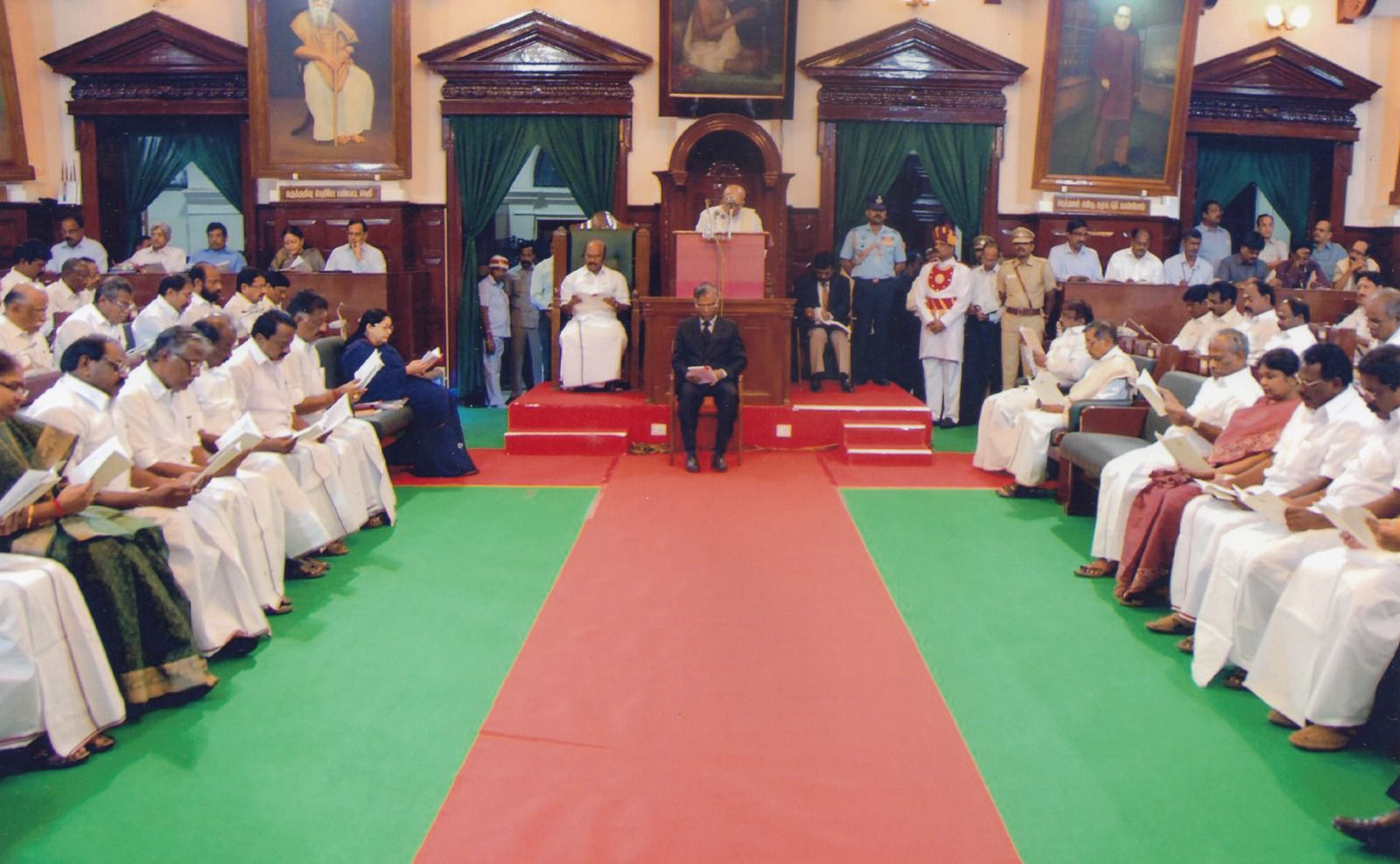
Governor's Address to the Tamil Nadu Legislative Assembly at Fort St. George

In the Republic of India, the Madras State Legislative Assembly continued to be the lower house in a bicameral legislature. The first election to the assembly on the basis of universal adult suffrage was held in January 1952. According to the Delimitation of Parliamentary and Assembly Constituencies (Madras) Order, 1951, made by the President under Sections 6 and 9 of the Representation of the People Act, 1951, the assembly's strength was to be 375 members elected from 309 constituencies. Out of the 309 constituencies in the undivided Madras State, 66 were two member constituencies, 62 of which had one seat reserved for Scheduled Caste candidates and 4 for Scheduled Tribe candidates. The two member constituencies were established in accordance to Article 332 of the Indian Constitution. The voting method and the plurality electoral formula were defined in The Representation of People Act, 1950. These constituencies were larger in size and had greater number of voters (more than 1,00,000) when compared to general constituencies. Multiple members were elected only in the 1952 and 1957 elections as double member representation was abolished in 1961 by the enactment of Two-Member Constituencies Abolition Act (1961). Of the 375 seats, 143 were from what later became Andhra State, 29 were from Malabar, 11 from South Canara (part of present-day Karnataka) and the remaining 190 belonged to what is now Tamil Nadu.

On 1 October 1953, a separate Andhra State, consisting of the Telugu-speaking areas of the composite Madras State, was formed, and the Kannada-speaking area of Bellary district was merged with the then Mysore State. This reduced the strength of the Legislative Assembly to 231. On 1 November 1956, the States Reorganisation Act took effect and consequently the constituencies in the erstwhile Malabar District were merged with Kerala State. This further reduced the strength to 190. The Tamil-speaking area of Kerala (present day Kanyakumari district) and Sengottai taluk were added to Madras State. According to the new Delimitation of Parliamentary and Assembly Constituencies Order 1956, made by the Delimitation Commission of India under the provisions of the State Reorganisation Act of 1956, the strength of the assembly was increased to 205.

The 1957 elections were conducted for these 205 seats. In 1959, as result of the Andhra Pradesh and Madras (Alteration of Boundaries) Act, 1959, one member from the Andhra Pradesh Legislative Assembly was allotted to Madras increasing its Legislative Assembly strength to 206. The 1962 elections were conducted for these 206 seats. In 1965, the elected strength of the assembly was increased to 234 by the Delimitation of Parliamentary and Assembly Constituencies Order, 1965. In addition to the 234, the assembly also has one nominated member representing the Anglo-Indian community. From 1965, the number of members has remained constant. In 1969, Madras State was renamed Tamil Nadu and subsequently the assembly came to be known as the "Tamil Nadu Legislative Assembly". The Legislative Council was abolished with effect from 1 November 1986 through an Act of Parliament titled as The Tamil Nadu Legislative Council (Abolition) Act, 1986. With the abolition of the council, the legislature became a unicameral body and remained so for the next 24 years. Of the fourteen assemblies that have been constituted so far, four (the sixth, seventh, ninth and tenth) have been dismissed by the Central Government using Article 356 of the Indian Constitution. This State Assembly is unique because, since 1996, the actual leader of the official opposition party, though he or she is an official member of the house, has chosen mostly to sign the attendance register outside but not attend the house proceedings. M. Karunanidhi, J. Jayalalithaa, and Vijayakant conducted themselves in this manner, unless an extremely important situation happened. Once M. K. Stalin became the leader of the opposition in 2016, the leader of the opposition always came and participated fully in the House. Following the 2021 elections, the leader of the opposition Edappadi K. Palaniswami, also attended the house.

== Location ==
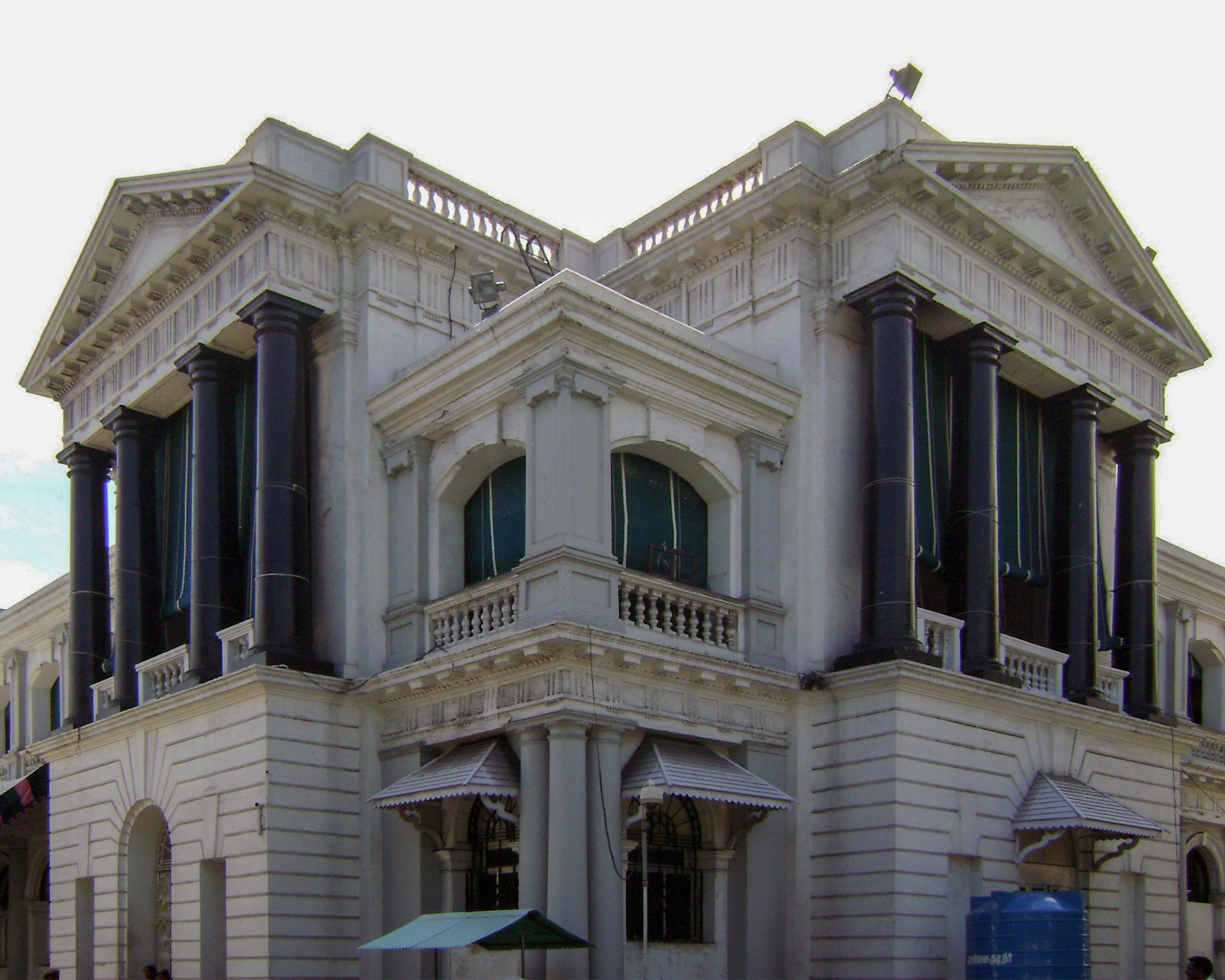
Fort St. George is the current home of the Tamil Nadu Legislative Assembly

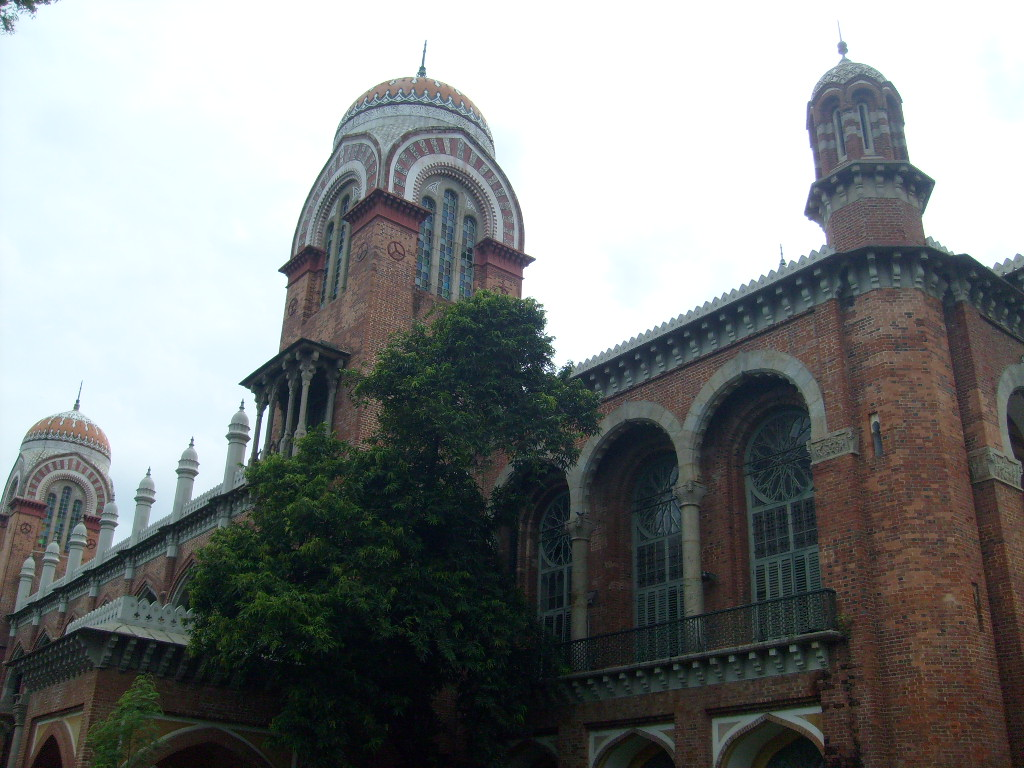
Senate House at University of Madras, where the assembly met in the 1930s

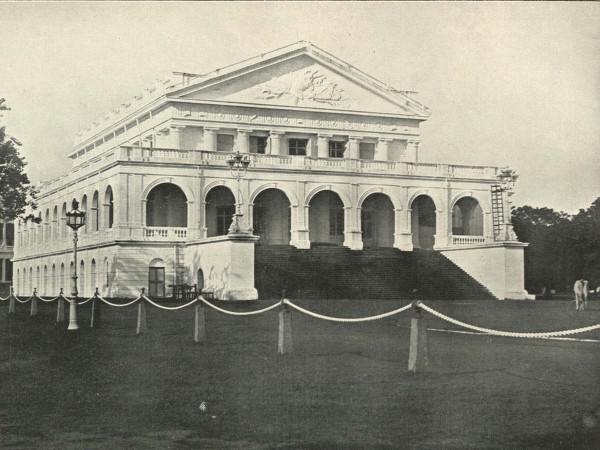
Rajaji Hall which briefly hosted the assembly in the late 1930s

The Legislative Assembly is seated at the Fort St. George, Chennai. Fort St. George has historically been the seat of the Government of Tamil Nadu since colonial times. During 1921–37, the precursor to the assembly – Madras Legislative Council, met at the council chambers within the fort. Between 14 July 1937 – 21 December 1938, the assembly met at the Senate House of the University of Madras and between 27 January 1938 – 26 October 1939 in the Banqueting Hall (later renamed as Rajaji Hall) in the Government Estate complex at Mount Road. During 1946–52, it moved back to the Fort St. George. In 1952, the strength of the assembly rose to 375, after the constitution of the first assembly, and it was briefly moved into temporary premises at the government estate complex. This move was made in March 1952, as the existing assembly building only had a seating capacity of 260. Then on 3 May 1952, it moved into the newly constructed assembly building in the same complex. The assembly functioned from the new building (later renamed as "Kalaivanar Arangam") during 1952–56. However, with the reorganisation of states and formation of Andhra, the strength came down to 190 and the assembly moved back to Fort St. George in 1956. From December 1956 till January 2010, the Fort remained the home to the assembly.

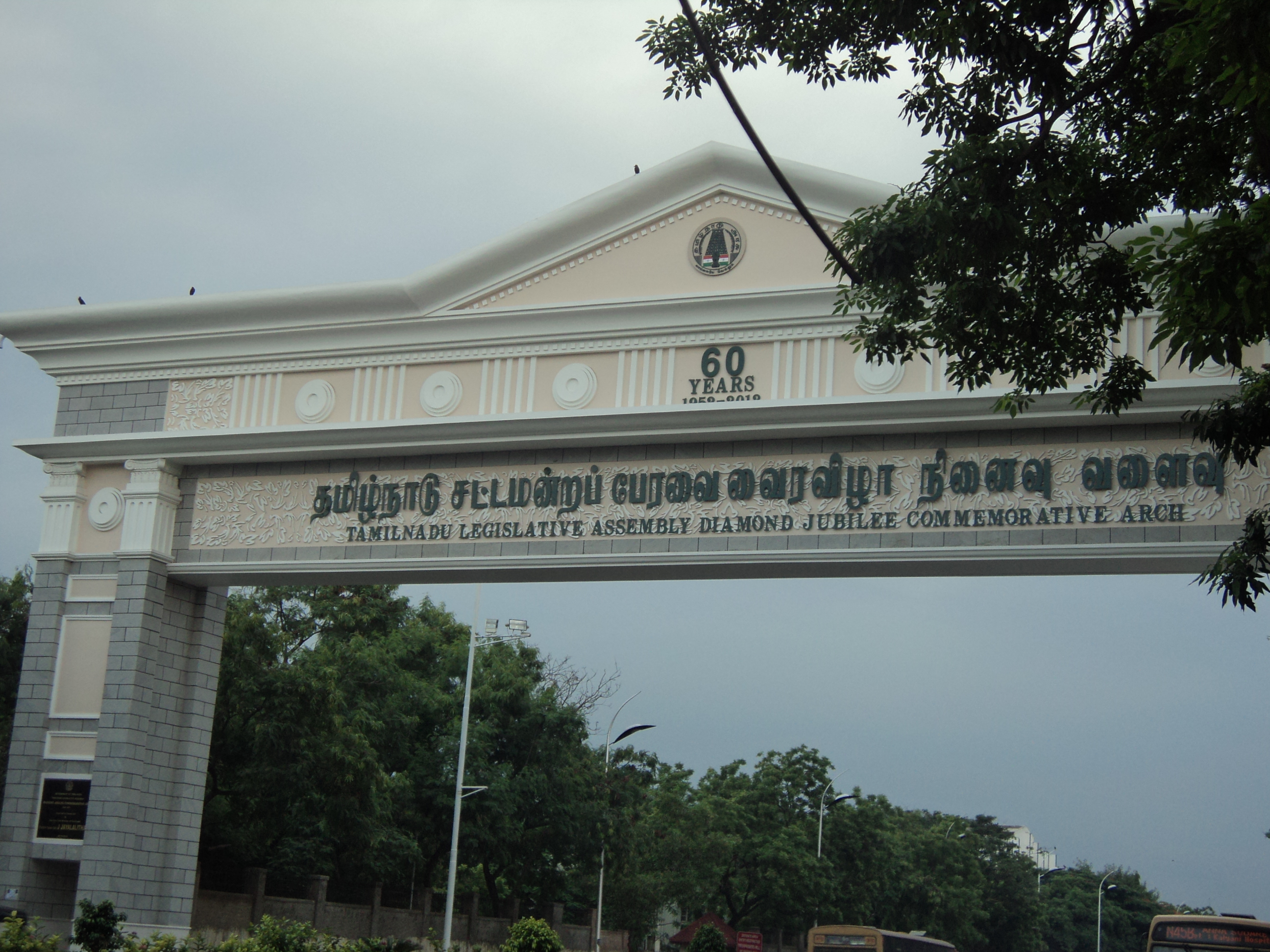
The Commemorative arch inaugurated, marking the Diamond Jubilee (1952–2012) of the Legislative Assembly

In 2004, during the 12th assembly, the AIADMK Government under J. Jayalalithaa made unsuccessful attempts to shift the assembly, first to the location of Queen Mary's College and later to the Anna University campus, Guindy. Both attempts were withdrawn after public opposition. During the 13th Assembly, the DMK government led by M. Karunanidhi proposed a new plan to shift the assembly and the government secretariat to a new building in the Omandurar Government Estate. In 2007, the German architectural firm GMP International won the design competition to design and construct the new assembly complex. Construction began in 2008 and was completed in 2010. The new assembly building was opened and the assembly started functioning in it from March 2010. After AIADMK's victory in the 2011 elections, the assembly shifted back to Fort St. George.

List of historical locations where the Tamil Nadu Legislature has been housed:

| Duration | Location |
|---|---|
| 11 July 1921 – 13 July 1937 | Council Chamber, Fort St. George, Chennai |
| 14 July 1937 – 21 December 1937 | Beveridge Hall, Senate House, Chennai |
| 27 January 1938 – 26 October 1939 | Multipurpose Hall, Rajaji Hall, Chennai |
| 24 May 1946 – 27 March 1952 | Council Chamber, Fort St. George, Chennai |
| 3 May 1952 – 27 December 1956 | Multipurpose Hall, Kalaivanar Arangam, Chennai |
| 29 April 1957 – 30 March 1959 | Assembly Chamber, Fort St. George, Chennai |
| 20 April 1959 – 30 April 1959 | Multipurpose Hall, Arranmore Palace, Udhagamandalam |
| 31 August 1959 – 11 January 2010 | Assembly Chamber, Fort St. George, Chennai |
| 19 March 2010 – 10 February 2011 | Assembly Chamber, Tamil Nadu Legislative Assembly-Secretariat Complex, Chennai |
| 23 May 2011 – 13 September 2020 | Assembly Chamber, Fort St. George, Chennai |
| 14 September 2020 – 13 September 2021 | Multipurpose Hall, Kalaivanar Arangam, Chennai |
| 5 January 2022 – present | Assembly Chamber, Fort St. George, Chennai |

== List of assemblies ==
| Assembly (Election) | Ruling Party | Chief Minister | Deputy Chief Minister | Speaker | Deputy Speaker | Leader of the House | Leader of the Opposition |
|---|---|---|---|---|---|---|---|
| 1st (1952) | Indian National Congress | C. Rajagopalachari K. Kamaraj | Vacant | J. Shivashanmugam Pillai N. Gopala Menon | B. Baktavatsalu Naidu | C. Subramaniam | T. Nagi Reddy P. Ramamurthi |
| 2nd (1957) | Indian National Congress | K. Kamaraj | Vacant | U. Krishna Rao | B. Baktavatsalu Naidu | C. Subramaniam | V. K. Ramaswami |
| 3rd (1962) | Indian National Congress | K. Kamaraj M. Bhakthavatsalam | Vacant | S. Chellapandian | K. Parthasarathi | M. Bhakthavatsalam | V. R. Nedunchezhiyan |
| 4th (1967) | Dravida Munnetra Kazhagam | C. N. Annadurai V. R. Nedunchezhiyan M. Karunanidhi | Vacant | S. P. Adithanar Pulavar K. Govindan | Pulavar K. Govindan G. R. Edmund | V. R. Nedunchezhiyan M. Karunanidhi V. R. Nedunchezhiyan | P. G. Karuthiruman |
| 5th (1971) | Dravida Munnetra Kazhagam | M. Karunanidhi | Vacant | K. A. Mathiazhagan Pulavar K. Govindan | P. Seenivasan N. Ganapathy | V. R. Nedunchezhiyan | Vacant (Note: No official opposition because no political party obtained at least 10% of the seats in the following assembly election) |
| 6th (1977) | All India Anna Dravida Munnetra Kazhagam | M. G. Ramachandran | Vacant | Munu Adhi | Su. Thirunavukkarasar | Nanjil K. Manoharan | M. Karunanidhi |
| 7th (1980) | All India Anna Dravida Munnetra Kazhagam | M. G. Ramachandran | Vacant | K. Rajaram | P. H. Pandian | V. R. Nedunchezhiyan | M. Karunanidhi |
| 7th (1980) | All India Anna Dravida Munnetra Kazhagam | M. G. Ramachandran | Vacant | K. Rajaram | P. H. Pandian | V. R. Nedunchezhiyan | K. S. G. Haja Shareef |
| 8th (1984) | All India Anna Dravida Munnetra Kazhagam | M. G. Ramachandran V. R. Nedunchezhiyan V. N. Janaki Ramachandran | Vacant | P. H. Pandian | V. P. Balasubramanian | V. R. Nedunchezhiyan R. M. Veerappan | O. Subramanian |
| 9th (1989) | Dravida Munnetra Kazhagam | M. Karunanidhi | Vacant | M. Tamilkudimagan | V. P. Duraisamy | K. Anbazhagan | J. Jayalalithaa |
| 9th (1989) | Dravida Munnetra Kazhagam | M. Karunanidhi | Vacant | M. Tamilkudimagan | V. P. Duraisamy | K. Anbazhagan | S. R. Eradha |
| 9th (1989) | Dravida Munnetra Kazhagam | M. Karunanidhi | Vacant | M. Tamilkudimagan | V. P. Duraisamy | K. Anbazhagan | G. K. Moopanar |
| 10th (1991) | All India Anna Dravida Munnetra Kazhagam | J. Jayalalithaa | Vacant | Sedapatti R. Muthiah | K. Ponnusamy S. Gandhirajan | V. R. Nedunchezhiyan | S. R. Balasubramoniyan |
| 11th (1996) | Dravida Munnetra Kazhagam | M. Karunanidhi | Vacant | P. T. R. Palanivel Rajan | Parithi Ilamvazhuthi | K. Anbazhagan | S. Balakrishnan |
| 12th (2001) | All India Anna Dravida Munnetra Kazhagam | J. Jayalalithaa O. Panneerselvam J. Jayalalithaa | Vacant | K. Kalimuthu | A. Arunachalam | C. Ponnaiyan | K. Anbazhagan |
| 13th (2006) | Dravida Munnetra Kazhagam | M. Karunanidhi | M. K. Stalin | R. Avudaiappan | V. P. Duraisamy | K. Anbazhagan | O. Panneerselvam J. Jayalalithaa |
| 14th (2011) | All India Anna Dravida Munnetra Kazhagam | J. Jayalalithaa O. Panneerselvam J. Jayalalithaa | Vacant | D. Jayakumar P. Dhanapal | P. Dhanapal Pollachi V. Jayaraman | O. Panneerselvam Natham R. Viswanathan O. Panneerselvam | Vijayakant |
| 14th (2011) | All India Anna Dravida Munnetra Kazhagam | J. Jayalalithaa O. Panneerselvam J. Jayalalithaa | Vacant | D. Jayakumar P. Dhanapal | P. Dhanapal Pollachi V. Jayaraman | O. Panneerselvam Natham R. Viswanathan O. Panneerselvam | Vacant (Note: No official opposition because no political party obtained at least 10% of the seats in the assembly) |
| 15th (2016) | All India Anna Dravida Munnetra Kazhagam | J. Jayalalithaa O. Panneerselvam Edappadi K. Palaniswami | O. Panneerselvam | P. Dhanapal | Pollachi V. Jayaraman | O. Panneerselvam K. A. Sengottaiyan O. Panneerselvam | M. K. Stalin |
| 16th (2021) | Dravida Munnetra Kazhagam | M. K. Stalin | Udhayanidhi Stalin | M. Appavu | K. Pitchandi | Duraimurugan | Edappadi K. Palaniswami |
| 17th (2026) | Tamilaga Vettri Kazhagam | C. Joseph Vijay | Vacant | J. C. D. Prabhakar | M. Ravisankar | K. A. Sengottaiyan | Udhayanidhi Stalin |

Note

In the 1952 election, no party achieved a majority in the assembly, so C. Rajagopalachari became the first and only non-elected chief minister. In the 1967 election, C. N. Annadurai was elected to the Lok Sabha and not to the assembly. He resigned as a member of parliament and was elected to the state legislative council to become chief minister.

== Members ==
| District | No. | Constituency | Name | Party | Alliance | Remarks |
|---|---|---|---|---|---|---|
| Tiruvallur | 1 | Gummidipoondi | S. Vijayakumar | TVK | SSJVA | |
| Tiruvallur | 2 | Ponneri | M. S. Ravi | TVK | SSJVA | |
| Tiruvallur | 3 | Tiruttani | G. Hari | AIADMK | NDA | Supported TVK; Later declared support for EPS |
| Tiruvallur | 4 | Thiruvallur | T. Arunkumar | TVK | SSJVA | |
| Tiruvallur | 5 | Poonamallee (SC) | R. Prakasam | TVK | SSJVA | |
| Tiruvallur | 6 | Avadi | R. Ramesh Kumar | TVK | SSJVA | |
| Chennai | 7 | Maduravoyal | P. Rhevanth Charan | TVK | SSJVA | |
| Chennai | 8 | Ambattur | G. Balamurugan | TVK | SSJVA | |
| Chennai | 9 | Madavaram | M. L. Vijayprabhu | TVK | SSJVA | |
| Chennai | 10 | Thiruvottiyur | N. Senthil Kumar | TVK | SSJVA | |
| Chennai | 11 | Dr. Radhakrishnan Nagar | N. Marie Wilson | TVK | SSJVA | Cabinet Minister |
| Chennai | 12 | Perambur | C. Joseph Vijay | TVK | SSJVA | Chief Minister |
| Chennai | 13 | Kolathur | V. S. Babu | TVK | SSJVA | |
| Chennai | 14 | Villivakkam | Aadhav Arjuna | TVK | SSJVA | Cabinet Minister |
| Chennai | 15 | Thiru-Vi-Ka-Nagar (SC) | M. R. Pallavi | TVK | SSJVA | |
| Chennai | 16 | Egmore (SC) | A. Rajmohan | TVK | SSJVA | Cabinet Minister |
| Chennai | 17 | Royapuram | K. V. Vijay Damu | TVK | SSJVA | |
| Chennai | 18 | Harbour | P. K. Sekar Babu | DMK | SPA | |
| Chennai | 19 | Chepauk-Thiruvallikeni | Udhayanidhi Stalin | DMK | SPA | Leader of the Opposition |
| Chennai | 20 | Thousand Lights | J. C. D. Prabhakar | TVK | SSJVA | Speaker |
| Chennai | 21 | Anna Nagar | V. K. Ramkumar | TVK | SSJVA | |
| Chennai | 22 | Virugampakkam | R. Sabarinathan | TVK | SSJVA | Government Whip |
| Chennai | 23 | Saidapet | M. Arul Prakasam | TVK | SSJVA | |
| Chennai | 24 | Thiyagarayanagar | Bussy N. Anand | TVK | SSJVA | Cabinet Minister |
| Chennai | 25 | Mylapore | P. Venkataramanan | TVK | SSJVA | Cabinet Minister |
| Chennai | 26 | Velachery | R. Kumar | TVK | SSJVA | Cabinet Minister |
| Chennai | 27 | Sholinganallur | P. Saravanan | TVK | SSJVA | |
| Chennai | 28 | Alandur | M. Harish | TVK | SSJVA | |
| Kanchipuram | 29 | Sriperumbudur (SC) | Thennarasu. K. | TVK | SSJVA | Cabinet Minister |
| Chengalpattu | 30 | Pallavaram | J. Kamatchi | TVK | SSJVA | |
| Chengalpattu | 31 | Tambaram | D. Sarathkumar | TVK | SSJVA | Cabinet Minister |
| Chengalpattu | 32 | Chengalpattu | S. Thiyagarajan | TVK | SSJVA | |
| Chengalpattu | 33 | Thiruporur | B. Vijayaraj | TVK | SSJVA | |
| Chengalpattu | 34 | Cheyyur (SC) | E. Rajasekar | AIADMK | NDA | Opposed TVK |
| Chengalpattu | 35 | Madurantakam (SC) | Maragatham Kumaravel | AIADMK | NDA | Supported TVK, On 25 May 2026, resigned from office and officially joined TVK |
| Chengalpattu | 35 | Madurantakam (SC) | Maragatham Kumaravel | TVK | SSJVA | Elected on 9 October 2026 by election |
| Kanchipuram | 36 | Uthiramerur | J. Munirathinam | TVK | SSJVA | |
| Kanchipuram | 37 | Kancheepuram | R. V. Ranjithkumar | TVK | SSJVA | Cabinet Minister |
| Ranipet | 38 | Arakkonam (SC) | V. Gandhiraj | TVK | SSJVA | Cabinet Minister |
| Ranipet | 39 | Sholinghur | G. Kapil | TVK | SSJVA | |
| Vellore | 40 | Katpadi | M. Sudhakar | TVK | SSJVA | |
| Ranipet | 41 | Ranipet | I. Thahira | TVK | SSJVA | |
| Ranipet | 42 | Arcot | S. M. Sukumar | AIADMK | NDA | Supported TVK; Later declared support for EPS |
| Vellore | 43 | Vellore | M. M. Vinoth Kannan | TVK | TVK+ | |
| Vellore | 44 | Anaicut | D. Velazhagan | AIADMK | NDA | Opposed TVK |
| Vellore | 45 | Kilvaithinankuppam (SC) | E. Thenral Kumar | TVK | TVK+ | |
| Vellore | 46 | Gudiyatham (SC) | K. Sindhu | TVK | TVK+ | |
| Tirupathur | 47 | Vaniyambadi | Syed Farooq Basha | IUML | TVK+ | Won as SPA candidate, switched to TVK+ post-election |
| Tirupathur | 48 | Ambur | A. C. Vilwanathan | DMK | SPA | |
| Tirupathur | 49 | Jolarpet | K. C. Veeramani | AIADMK | NDA | Supported TVK; Later declared support for EPS |
| Tirupathur | 50 | Tirupattur | N. Thirupathi | TVK | TVK+ | |
| Krishnagiri | 51 | Uthangarai (SC) | N. Elaiyaraja | TVK | TVK+ | |
| Krishnagiri | 52 | Bargur | E. C. Govindarasan | AIADMK | NDA | Opposed TVK |
| Krishnagiri | 53 | Krishnagiri | P. Mukundhan | TVK | TVK+ | |
| Krishnagiri | 54 | Veppanahalli | P. S. Srinivasan | DMK | SPA | |
| Krishnagiri | 55 | Hosur | P. Balakrishna Reddy | AIADMK | NDA | Supported TVK; Later declared support for EPS |
| Krishnagiri | 56 | Thalli | T. Ramachandran | CPI | LDF | Won as SPA candidate; party switched to TVK+ post-election; Outside support to TVK government |
| Dharmapuri | 57 | Palacode | K. P. Anbalagan | AIADMK | NDA | Supported TVK; Later declared support for EPS |
| Dharmapuri | 58 | Pennagaram | S. Gajendran | TVK | TVK+ | |
| Dharmapuri | 59 | Dharmapuri | Sowmiya Anbumani | PMK | NDA | |
| Dharmapuri | 60 | Pappireddipatti | Maragatham Vetrivel | AIADMK | NDA | Supported TVK; Later declared support for EPS |
| Dharmapuri | 61 | Harur (SC) | V. Sampathkumar | AIADMK | NDA | Opposed TVK |
| Tiruvannamalai | 62 | Chengam (SC) | T. S. Velu | AIADMK | NDA | Opposed TVK |
| Tiruvannamalai | 63 | Tiruvannamalai | E. V. Velu | DMK | SPA | |
| Tiruvannamalai | 64 | Kilpennathur | S. Ramachandran | AIADMK | NDA | Opposed TVK |
| Tiruvannamalai | 65 | Kalasapakkam | Agri S. S. Krishnamurthy | AIADMK | NDA | Opposed TVK |
| Tiruvannamalai | 66 | Polur | R. Abhishek | TVK | TVK+ | |
| Tiruvannamalai | 67 | Arani | L. Jaya Sudha | AIADMK | NDA | Opposed TVK |
| Tiruvannamalai | 68 | Cheyyar | Mukkur N. Subramanian | AIADMK | NDA | Opposed TVK |
| Tiruvannamalai | 69 | Vandavasi (SC) | S. Ambethkumar | DMK | SPA | |
| Viluppuram | 70 | Gingee | A. Ganeshkumar | PMK | NDA | |
| Viluppuram | 71 | Mailam | C. Ve. Shanmugam | AIADMK | NDA | Supported TVK; Later declared support for EPS |
| Viluppuram | 72 | Tindivanam (SC) | Vanni Arasu | VCK | TVK+ | Won as SPA candidate; party switched to TVK+ post-election; Cabinet Minister |
| Viluppuram | 73 | Vanur (SC) | D. Gowtham | DMK | SPA | |
| Viluppuram | 74 | Villupuram | R. Lakshmanan | DMK | SPA | |
| Viluppuram | 75 | Vikravandi | C. Sivakumar | PMK | NDA | |
| Viluppuram | 76 | Tirukkoyilur | S. Palaniswamy | AIADMK | NDA | Opposed TVK |
| Kallakurichi | 77 | Ulundurpet | G. R. Vasanthavel | DMK | SPA | |
| Kallakurichi | 78 | Rishivandiyam | K. Karthikeyan | DMK | SPA | |
| Kallakurichi | 79 | Sankarapuram | R. Rakesh | AIADMK | NDA | Supported TVK; Later declared support for EPS |
| Kallakurichi | 80 | Kallakurichi (SC) | Arul Vignesh | TVK | TVK+ | |
| Salem | 81 | Gangavalli (SC) | A. Nallathambi | AIADMK | NDA | Opposed TVK |
| Salem | 82 | Attur (SC) | A. P. Jayasankaran | AIADMK | NDA | Opposed TVK |
| Salem | 83 | Yercaud (ST) | P. Usharani | AIADMK | NDA | Opposed TVK |
| Salem | 84 | Omalur | R. Mani | AIADMK | NDA | Opposed TVK |
| Salem | 85 | Mettur | G. Venkatachalam | AIADMK | NDA | Opposed TVK |
| Salem | 86 | Edappadi | Edappadi K. Palaniswami | AIADMK | NDA | Opposed TVK |
| Salem | 87 | Sankari | S. Vetrivel | AIADMK | NDA | Opposed TVK |
| Salem | 88 | Salem West | S. Lakshmanan | TVK | TVK+ | |
| Salem | 89 | Salem North | K. Sivakumar | TVK | TVK+ | |
| Salem | 90 | Salem South | Vijay Tamilan Parthiban | TVK | TVK+ | Cabinet Minister |
| Salem | 91 | Veerapandi | M. S. Palanivel | TVK | TVK+ | |
| Namakkal | 92 | Rasipuram (SC) | Logesh Tamilselvan | TVK | TVK+ | Cabinet Minister |
| Namakkal | 93 | Senthamangalam (ST) | P. Chandrasekar | TVK | TVK+ | |
| Namakkal | 94 | Namakkal | C. S. Dileep | TVK | TVK+ | |
| Namakkal | 95 | Paramathi-Velur | S. Sekar | AIADMK | NDA | Supported TVK; Later declared support for EPS |
| Namakkal | 96 | Tiruchengode | K. G. Arunraj | TVK | TVK+ | Cabinet Minister |
| Namakkal | 97 | Kumarapalayam | C. Vijayalakshmi | TVK | TVK+ | Cabinet Minister |
| Erode | 98 | Erode East | M. Vijay Balaji | TVK | TVK+ | Cabinet Minister |
| Erode | 99 | Erode West | K. K. Anand Mohan | TVK | TVK+ | |
| Erode | 100 | Modakkurichi | D. Shanmugan | TVK | TVK+ | |
| Tiruppur | 101 | Dharapuram (SC) | P. Sathyabama | AIADMK | NDA | Supported TVK |
| Tiruppur | 101 | Dharapuram (SC) | P. Sathyabama | TVK | TVK+ | On 25 May 2026, resigned from office and officially joined TVK |
| Tiruppur | 102 | Kangayam | N. S. N. Nataraj | AIADMK | NDA | Supported TVK; Later declared support for EPS |
| Erode | 103 | Perundurai | S. Jayakumar | AIADMK | NDA | Supported TVK |
| Erode | 103 | Perundurai | Vacant | | | On 25 May 2026, resigned from office and officially joined TVK |
| Erode | 104 | Bhavani | K. C. Karuppannan | AIADMK | NDA | Opposed TVK |
| Erode | 105 | Anthiyur | P. Haribaskar | AIADMK | NDA | Supported TVK; Later declared support for EPS |
| Erode | 106 | Gobichettipalayam | K. A. Sengottaiyan | TVK | TVK+ | Cabinet Minister |
| Erode | 107 | Bhavanisagar (SC) | V. P. Tamilselvi | TVK | TVK+ | |
| Nilgiris | 108 | Udhagamandalam | M. Bhojarajan | BJP | NDA | |
| Nilgiris | 109 | Gudalur (SC) | M. Dravidamani | DMK | SPA | |
| Nilgiris | 110 | Coonoor | M. Raju | DMK | SPA | |
| Coimbatore | 111 | Mettuppalayam | N. Sunil Anand | TVK | TVK+ | |
| Tiruppur | 112 | Avanashi (SC) | S. Kamali | TVK | TVK+ | Cabinet Minister |
| Tiruppur | 113 | Tiruppur North | V. Sathyabama | TVK | TVK+ | |
| Tiruppur | 114 | Tiruppur South | S. Balamurugan | TVK | TVK+ | |
| Tiruppur | 115 | Palladam | K. Ramkumar | TVK | TVK+ | |
| Coimbatore | 116 | Sulur | N. M. Sukumar | TVK | TVK+ | |
| Coimbatore | 117 | Kavundampalayam | Kanimozhi Santhosh | TVK | TVK+ | |
| Coimbatore | 118 | Coimbatore North | V. Sampathkumar | TVK | TVK+ | Cabinet Minister |
| Coimbatore | 119 | Thondamuthur | S. P. Velumani | AIADMK | NDA | Supported TVK; Later declared support for EPS |
| Coimbatore | 120 | Coimbatore South | V. Senthilbalaji | DMK | SPA | |
| Coimbatore | 121 | Singanallur | K. S. Sri Giri Prasath | TVK | TVK+ | |
| Coimbatore | 122 | Kinathukadavu | K. Vignesh | TVK | TVK+ | Cabinet Minister |
| Coimbatore | 123 | Pollachi | K. Nithyanandhan | DMK | SPA | |
| Coimbatore | 124 | Valparai (SC) | A. Sudhakar | DMK | SPA | |
| Tiruppur | 125 | Udumalaipettai | M. Jayakumar | DMK | SPA | |
| Tiruppur | 126 | Madathukulam | R. Jayaramakrishnan | DMK | SPA | |
| Dindigul | 127 | Palani | K. Ravimanoharan | AIADMK | NDA | Supported TVK; Later declared support for EPS |
| Dindigul | 128 | Oddanchatram | R. Sakkarapani | DMK | SPA | |
| Dindigul | 129 | Athoor | I. Periyasamy | DMK | SPA | |
| Dindigul | 130 | Nilakkottai (SC) | R. Ayyanar | TVK | TVK+ | |
| Dindigul | 131 | Natham | Natham R. Viswanathan | AIADMK | NDA | Supported TVK; Later declared support for EPS |
| Dindigul | 132 | Dindigul | I. P. Senthilkumar | DMK | SPA | |
| Dindigul | 133 | Vedasandur | T. Saminathan | DMK | SPA | |
| Karur | 134 | Aravakurichi | R. Elango | DMK | SPA | |
| Karur | 135 | Karur | M. R. Vijayabhaskar | AIADMK | NDA | Supported TVK |
| Karur | 135 | Karur | Vacant | | | On 29 June 2026, resigned from office |
| Karur | 136 | Krishnarayapuram (SC) | Sathya M. | TVK | TVK+ | |
| Karur | 137 | Kulithalai | Suriyanur A. Chandran | DMK | SPA | |
| Tiruchirappalli | 138 | Manapparai | R. Kathiravan | TVK | TVK+ | |
| Tiruchirappalli | 139 | Srirangam | S. Ramesh | TVK | TVK+ | Cabinet Minister |
| Tiruchirappalli | 140 | Tiruchirappalli West | K. N. Nehru | DMK | SPA | Deputy Leader of the Opposition |
| Tiruchirappalli | 141 | Tiruchirappalli East | C. Joseph Vijay | TVK | TVK+ | |
| Tiruchirappalli | 141 | Tiruchirappalli East | Vacant | | | On 10 May 2026, resigned from office and retained the Perambur Assembly constituency |
| Tiruchirappalli | 142 | Thiruverumbur | Navalpattu S. Viji | TVK | TVK+ | |
| Tiruchirappalli | 143 | Lalgudi | Leema Rose Martin | AIADMK | NDA | Supported TVK; Later declared support for EPS |
| Tiruchirappalli | 144 | Manachanallur | S. Kathiravan | DMK | SPA | |
| Tiruchirappalli | 145 | Musiri | M. Vignesh | TVK | TVK+ | |
| Tiruchirappalli | 146 | Thuraiyur (SC) | M. Ravisankar | TVK | TVK+ | Deputy Speaker |
| Perambalur | 147 | Perambalur (SC) | K. Sivakumar | TVK | TVK+ | |
| Perambalur | 148 | Kunnam | S. S. Sivasankar | DMK | SPA | |
| Ariyalur | 149 | Ariyalur | S. Rajendran | AIADMK | NDA | Opposed TVK |
| Ariyalur | 150 | Jayankondam | G. Vaithilingam | PMK | NDA | |
| Cuddalore | 151 | Tittakudi (SC) | C. V. Ganesan | DMK | SPA | |
| Cuddalore | 152 | Vriddhachalam | Premallatha Vijayakant | DMDK | SPA | |
| Cuddalore | 153 | Neyveli | R. Rajendran | AIADMK | NDA | Opposed TVK |
| Cuddalore | 154 | Panruti | K. Mohan | AIADMK | NDA | Supported TVK; Later declared support for EPS |
| Cuddalore | 155 | Cuddalore | B. Rajkumar | TVK | TVK+ | Cabinet Minister |
| Cuddalore | 156 | Kurinjipadi | M. R. K. Panneerselvam | DMK | SPA | |
| Cuddalore | 157 | Bhuvanagiri | A. Arunmozhithevan | AIADMK | NDA | Supported TVK; Later declared support for EPS |
| Cuddalore | 158 | Chidambaram | M. Thamimum Ansari | DMK | SPA | |
| Cuddalore | 159 | Kattumannarkoil (SC) | L. E. Jothimani | VCK | TVK+ | Won as SPA candidate; party switched to TVK+ post-election |
| Mayiladuthurai | 160 | Sirkazhi (SC) | R. Senthilselvan | DMK | SPA | |
| Mayiladuthurai | 161 | Mayiladuthurai | Jamal Mohamed Younoos | INC | TVK+ | Won as SPA candidate; party switched to TVK+ post-election |
| Mayiladuthurai | 162 | Poompuhar | Nivedha M. Murugan | DMK | SPA | |
| Nagapattinam | 163 | Nagapattinam | M. H. Jawahirullah | DMK | SPA | |
| Nagapattinam | 164 | Kilvelur (SC) | T. Latha | CPI(M) | LDF | Won as SPA candidate; party switched to TVK+ post-election; outside support to TVK government |
| Nagapattinam | 165 | Vedaranyam | O. S. Manian | AIADMK | NDA | Opposed TVK |
| Tiruvarur | 166 | Thiruthuraipoondi (SC) | K. Marimuthu | CPI | LDF | Won as SPA candidate; party switched to TVK+ post-election; outside support to TVK government |
| Tiruvarur | 167 | Mannargudi | S. Kamaraj | AMMK | NDA | |
| Tiruvarur | 167 | Mannargudi | S. Kamaraj | IND | TVK+ | Outside support to TVK government; Expelled from AMMK |
| Tiruvarur | 168 | Thiruvarur | K. Poondi Kalaivanan | DMK | SPA | |
| Tiruvarur | 169 | Nannilam | R. Kamaraj | AIADMK | NDA | Supported TVK; Later declared support for EPS |
| Thanjavur | 170 | Thiruvidaimarudur | Govi. Chezhian | DMK | SPA | |
| Thanjavur | 171 | Kumbakonam | R. Vinoth | TVK | TVK+ | Cabinet Minister |
| Thanjavur | 172 | Papanasam | A. M. Shahjahan | IUML | TVK+ | Won as SPA candidate; party switched to TVK+ post-election; Cabinet Minister |
| Thanjavur | 173 | Thiruvaiyaru | Durai Chandrasekaran | DMK | SPA | |
| Thanjavur | 174 | Thanjavur | R. Vijaysaravanan | TVK | TVK+ | |
| Thanjavur | 175 | Orathanadu | R. Vaithilingam | DMK | SPA | |
| Thanjavur | 176 | Pattukkottai | K. Annadurai | DMK | SPA | |
| Thanjavur | 177 | Peravurani | N. Ashokkumar | DMK | SPA | |
| Pudukkottai | 178 | Gandarvakkottai (SC) | N. Subramanian | TVK | TVK+ | |
| Pudukkottai | 179 | Viralimalai | C. Vijayabaskar | AIADMK | NDA | Supported TVK |
| Pudukkottai | 179 | Viralimalai | Vacant | | | On 16 June 2026, resigned from office |
| Pudukkottai | 180 | Pudukkottai | V. Muthuraja | DMK | SPA | |
| Pudukkottai | 181 | Thirumayam | S. Regupathy | DMK | SPA | |
| Pudukkottai | 182 | Alangudi | Siva V. Meyyanathan | DMK | SPA | |
| Pudukkottai | 183 | Aranthangi | J. Mohamed Farvas | TVK | TVK+ | Cabinet Minister |
| Sivaganga | 184 | Karaikudi | T. K. Prabhu | TVK | TVK+ | Cabinet Minister |
| Sivaganga | 185 | Tirupattur | Srinivasa Sethupathi | TVK | TVK+ | |
| Sivaganga | 186 | Sivaganga | Kulanthai Rani | TVK | TVK+ | |
| Sivaganga | 187 | Manamadurai (SC) | D. Elangovan | TVK | TVK+ | |
| Madurai | 188 | Melur | P. Viswanathan | INC | TVK+ | Won as SPA candidate; party switched to TVK+ post-election; Cabinet Minister |
| Madurai | 189 | Madurai East | S. Karthikeyan | TVK | TVK+ | |
| Madurai | 190 | Sholavandan (SC) | M. V. Karuppiah | TVK | TVK+ | |
| Madurai | 191 | Madurai North | A. Kallanai | TVK | TVK+ | |
| Madurai | 192 | Madurai South | M. M. Gopison | TVK | TVK+ | |
| Madurai | 193 | Madurai Central | Madhar Badhurudeen | TVK | TVK+ | |
| Madurai | 194 | Madurai West | S. R. Thangapandi | TVK | TVK+ | |
| Madurai | 195 | Thiruparankundram | C. T. R. Nirmal Kumar | TVK | TVK+ | Cabinet Minister |
| Madurai | 196 | Thirumangalam | Sedapatti M. Manimaran | DMK | SPA | |
| Madurai | 197 | Usilampatti | M. Vijay | TVK | TVK+ | |
| Theni | 198 | Andipatti | A. Maharajan | DMK | SPA | |
| Theni | 199 | Periyakulam (SC) | G. Sabari Iyngaran | TVK | TVK+ | |
| Theni | 200 | Bodinayakanur | O. Panneerselvam | DMK | SPA | |
| Theni | 201 | Cumbum | P. L. A. Jeganathmishra | TVK | TVK+ | |
| Virudhunagar | 202 | Rajapalayam | K. Jegadeshwari | TVK | TVK+ | Cabinet Minister |
| Virudhunagar | 203 | Srivilliputhur (SC) | A. Karthik | TVK | TVK+ | |
| Virudhunagar | 204 | Sattur | A. Kadarkarairaj | DMK | SPA | |
| Virudhunagar | 205 | Sivakasi | S. Keerthana | TVK | TVK+ | Cabinet Minister |
| Virudhunagar | 206 | Virudhunagar | P. Selvam | TVK | TVK+ | |
| Virudhunagar | 207 | Aruppukkottai | K. K. S. S. R. Ramachandran | DMK | SPA | |
| Virudhunagar | 208 | Tiruchuli | Thangam Thenarasu | DMK | SPA | |
| Ramanathapuram | 209 | Paramakudi (SC) | K. K. Kathiravan | DMK | SPA | |
| Ramanathapuram | 210 | Tiruvadanai | Rajeev | TVK | TVK+ | Cabinet Minister |
| Ramanathapuram | 211 | Ramanathapuram | Katharbatcha Muthuramalingam | DMK | SPA | |
| Ramanathapuram | 212 | Mudhukulathur | R. S. Rajakannappan | DMK | SPA | |
| Thoothukudi | 213 | Vilathikulam | G. V. Markandayan | DMK | SPA | |
| Thoothukudi | 214 | Thoothukkudi | Srinath | TVK | TVK+ | Cabinet Minister |
| Thoothukudi | 215 | Tiruchendur | Anitha R. Radhakrishnan | DMK | SPA | |
| Thoothukudi | 216 | Srivaikuntam | G. Saravanan | TVK | TVK+ | |
| Thoothukudi | 217 | Ottapidaram (SC) | P. Mathanraja | TVK | TVK+ | Cabinet Minister |
| Thoothukudi | 218 | Kovilpatti | K. Karunanithi | DMK | SPA | |
| Tenkasi | 219 | Sankarankovil (SC) | Dhilipan Jaishankar | AIADMK | NDA | Supported TVK; Later declared support for EPS |
| Tenkasi | 220 | Vasudevanallur (SC) | E. Raja | DMK | SPA | |
| Tenkasi | 221 | Kadayanallur | T. M. Rajendran | DMK | SPA | |
| Tenkasi | 222 | Tenkasi | Kalai Kathiravan | DMK | SPA | |
| Tenkasi | 223 | Alangulam | P. H. Manoj Pandian | DMK | SPA | |
| Tirunelveli | 224 | Tirunelveli | R. S. Murughan | TVK | TVK+ | |
| Tirunelveli | 225 | Ambasamudram | Esakki Subaya | AIADMK | NDA | Supported TVK |
| Tirunelveli | 225 | Ambasamudram | Vacant | | | On 26 May 2026, resigned from office and officially joined TVK |
| Tirunelveli | 226 | Palayamkottai | M. Abdul Wahab | DMK | SPA | |
| Tirunelveli | 227 | Nanguneri | Reddiarpatti V. Narayanan | TVK | TVK+ | |
| Tirunelveli | 228 | Radhapuram | Sathish Christopher | TVK | TVK+ | |
| Kanyakumari | 229 | Kanniyakumari | N. Thalavai Sundaram | AIADMK | NDA | Opposed TVK |
| Kanyakumari | 230 | Nagercoil | S. Austin | DMK | SPA | |
| Kanyakumari | 231 | Colachal | Tharahai Cuthbert | INC | TVK+ | Won as SPA candidate; party switched to TVK+ post-election |
| Kanyakumari | 232 | Padmanabhapuram | R. Chellaswamy | CPI(M) | LDF | Won as SPA candidate; party switched to TVK+ post-election; outside support to TVK government |
| Kanyakumari | 233 | Vilavancode | T. T. Praveen | INC | TVK+ | Won as SPA candidate; party switched to TVK+ post-election |
| Kanyakumari | 234 | Killiyoor | S. Rajeshkumar | INC | TVK+ | Won as SPA candidate; party switched to TVK+ post-election; Cabinet Minister |

== Party position ==
Number of members of legislative assembly by party-wise and their floor leaders (As on 21 November 2026):

| Alliance | Political party | No. of MLAs | Floor leader of the party |
|---|---|---|---|
| Government; SSJVA; Seats: 118 | Tamilaga Vettri Kazhagam | 108 | C. Joseph Vijay (Chief Minister) |
| Government; SSJVA; Seats: 118 | Indian National Congress | 5 | Tharahai Cuthbert |
| Government; SSJVA; Seats: 118 | Indian Union Muslim League | 2 | A. M. Shahjahan |
| Government; SSJVA; Seats: 118 | Viduthalai Chiruthaigal Katchi | 2 | Vanni Arasu |
| Outside Support/ Confidence and Supply; LF and one other Seats: 5 | Communist Party of India | 2 | T. Ramachandran |
| Outside Support/ Confidence and Supply; LF and one other Seats: 5 | Communist Party of India (Marxist) | 2 | R. Chellaswamy |
| Outside Support/ Confidence and Supply; LF and one other Seats: 5 | Independent | 1 | S. Kamaraj |
| Opposition; SPA; Seats: 60 | Dravida Munnetra Kazhagam | 59 | Udhayanidhi Stalin (Leader of the Opposition) |
| Opposition; SPA; Seats: 60 | Desiya Murpokku Dravida Kazhagam | 1 | Premallatha Vijayakant |
| Others AIADMK+ Seats: 46 | All India Anna Dravida Munnetra Kazhagam | 41 | Edappadi K. Palaniswami |
| Others AIADMK+ Seats: 46 | Pattali Makkal Katchi | 4 | Sowmiya Anbumani |
| Others AIADMK+ Seats: 46 | Bharatiya Janata Party | 1 | M. Bhojarajan |
| Vacant; Seats: 6 | Perundurai; Karur; Tiruchirappalli (East); Viralimalai; Ambasamudram; Kolathur | 6 | N/A |
| Total | | 234 | |

== Past composition ==
1971–1977

| 8 | 7 | 4 | 184 | 15 | 6 | 2 | 8 |
| CPI | AIFB | PSP | DMK | INC (O) | SWP | IUML | Ind |

1977–1980

| 12 | 5 | 1 | 27 | 48 | 130 | 10 | 1 |
| CPI (M) | CPI | AIFB | INC (I) | DMK | AIADMK | JP | IUML |

1980–1984

| 11 | 9 | 1 | 31 | 6 | 37 | 129 | 2 | 8 |
| CPI (M) | CPI | AIFB | INC (I) | GKC | DMK | AIADMK | JP | Ind |

1984–1989

| 5 | 2 | 61 | 2 | 24 | 132 | 1 | 3 | 4 |
| CPI (M) | CPI | INC (I) | GKC | DMK | AIADMK | AKD | JP | Ind |

1989–1991

| 15 | 3 | 26 | 150 | 27 | 2 | 4 | 5 |
| CPI (M) | CPI | INC (I) | DMK | ADK (J) | ADK (JA) | JP | Ind |

1991–1996

| 1 | 1 | 1 | 1 | 2 | 2 | 164 | 60 | 1 | 1 |
| CPI (M) | CPI | ICS | JD | DMK | TMK | AIADMK | INC | PMK | Ind |

1996–2001

| 1 | 8 | 1 | 1 | 173 | 4 | 1 | 39 | 4 | 1 | 1 |
| CPI (M) | CPI | AIFB | JD | DMK | AIADMK | JP | TMC (M) | PMK | BJP | Ind |

2001–2006

| 6 | 5 | 1 | 31 | 132 | 2 | 7 | 23 | 20 | 4 | 3 |
| CPI (M) | CPI | AIFB | DMK | AIADMK | MADMK | INC | TMC (M) | PMK | BJP | Ind |

13th Assembly (2006 Election)

| 96 | 61 | 34 | 18 | 9 | 6 | 6 | 2 | 1 | 1 |
| DMK | AIADMK | INC | PMK | CPI(M) | CPI | MDMK | VCK | DMDK | IND |

14th Assembly (2011 Election)

| 150 | 29 | 23 | 10 | 9 | 5 | 3 | 2 | 2 | 1 |
| AIADMK | DMDK | DMK | CPI(M) | CPI | INC | PMK | MMK | PT | AIFB |

15th Assembly (2016 Election)

| 136 | 89 | 8 | 1 |
| AIADMK | DMK | INC | IUML |

16th Assembly (2021 Election)

| 133 | 66 | 18 | 5 | 4 | 4 | 2 | 2 | AIADMK | INC | PMK | BJP | VCK | CPI | CPI(M) |

17th Assembly (2026 Election)

| 108 | 59 | 47 | 5 | 4 | 2 | 2 | 2 | 2 | 1 | 1 | 1 |
| TVK | DMK | ADMK | INC | PMK | CPI | CPI(M) | IUML | VCK | AMMK | BJP | DMDK |

== List of the outcomes of Floor Tests in the Assembly ==
First ever Trust vote in any Legislature of India held on 3 July 1952 - Rajaji government won
| 200 | 151 | 1 |
| AYES | NOES | ABSTAIN |

Trust vote held on 28 January 1988 - Janaki government declared won based on the participation-strength of 110 (excluding the speaker) and the outcome disputed
| 99 | 8 | 3 | 33 |
| AYES | NOES | ABSTAIN | EXPELLED |

Trust vote held on 18 February 2017 - Edappadi K. Palaniswami government won
| 122 | 11 | 98 |
| AYES | NOES | EXPELLED |

Vote of confidence motion held on 13 May 2026 - C. Joseph Vijay government won
| 144 | 22 | 5 | 60 |
| AYES | NOES | ABSTAIN | WALKOUT |

== Portraits in the assembly chamber ==
| No. | Portrait of | Unveiled | | Ruling party |
| No. | Portrait of | On | By | Ruling party |
|---|---|---|---|---|
| 1 | C. Rajagopalachari | 24 June 1948 | Jawaharlal Nehru | Indian National Congress |
| 2 | Mahatma Gandhi | 23 August 1948 | C. Rajagopalachari | Indian National Congress |
| 3 | Thiruvalluvar | 22 March 1964 | Zakir Husain | Indian National Congress |
| 4 | C. N. Annadurai | 6 October 1969 | Indira Gandhi | Dravida Munnetra Kazhagam |
| 5 | K. Kamaraj | 18 August 1977 | Neelam Sanjiva Reddy | All India Anna Dravida Munnetra Kazhagam |
| 6 | E. V. Ramasami | 9 August 1980 | Jothi Venkatachalam | All India Anna Dravida Munnetra Kazhagam |
| 7 | B. R. Ambedkar | 9 August 1980 | Jothi Venkatachalam | All India Anna Dravida Munnetra Kazhagam |
| 8 | U. Muthuramalingam | 9 August 1980 | Jothi Venkatachalam | All India Anna Dravida Munnetra Kazhagam |
| 9 | M. Muhammad Ismail | 9 August 1980 | Jothi Venkatachalam | All India Anna Dravida Munnetra Kazhagam |
| 10 | M. G. Ramachandran | 31 January 1992 | J. Jayalalithaa | All India Anna Dravida Munnetra Kazhagam |
| 11 | J. Jayalalithaa | 12 February 2018 | P. Dhanapal | All India Anna Dravida Munnetra Kazhagam |
| 12 | S. S. Ramaswami | 19 July 2019 | Edappadi K. Palaniswami | All India Anna Dravida Munnetra Kazhagam |
| 13 | V. O. Chidambaram | 23 February 2021 | Edappadi K. Palaniswami | All India Anna Dravida Munnetra Kazhagam |
| 14 | P. Subbarayan | 23 February 2021 | Edappadi K. Palaniswami | All India Anna Dravida Munnetra Kazhagam |
| 15 | Omanthur P. Ramaswamy | 23 February 2021 | Edappadi K. Palaniswami | All India Anna Dravida Munnetra Kazhagam |
| 16 | M. Karunanidhi | 2 August 2021 | Ram Nath Kovind | Dravida Munnetra Kazhagam |

The bust of P. Rajagopalachari and L. D. Swamikannu Pillai, former presidents of the Madras Legislative Council, adorns the assembly lobby.

== See also ==
- History of Tamil Nadu
- Elections in Tamil Nadu
- Government of Tamil Nadu
- Chief Minister of Tamil Nadu
- Chief Secretariat of Tamil Nadu
- Deputy Chief Minister of Tamil Nadu
- Speaker of the Tamil Nadu Legislative Assembly
- Leader of the Opposition in the Tamil Nadu Legislative Assembly
- List of leaders of the house in the Tamil Nadu Legislative Assembly
