= C. K. Kuppuswamy =

Indian politician

Member of Parliament, Lok Sabha
- In office 1984 – 1996
- Preceded by: Era Mohan
- Succeeded by: M. Ramanathan
- Constituency: Coimbatore, Tamil Nadu

Personal details
- Born: 16 March 1932 (age 94)
- Party: Pattali Makkal Katchi (since 2018)
- Other political affiliations: Indian National Congress (before 1996, 2001–2018); Tamil Maanila Congress (Moopanar) (1996–2001)
- Spouse: Muthammal (m. 1955)
- Children: 1 daughter
- Parent: Karuppanna Gounder (father)
- Profession: Agriculturist and Businessman

C. K. Kuppuswamy (born 16 March 1932) is an Indian politician from Tamil Nadu and a three-time member of Lok Sabha.

== Early life ==
Kuppuswamy was born in Chandrapuram, Coimbatore district, Tamil Nadu.

== Career ==
Kuppuswamy was first elected as a Member of Parliament in 1984. He won the Indian General Election in Tamil Nadu representing Indian National Congress from Coimbatore Lok Sabha Constituency defeating R. Umanath of CPI(M). He was re-elected from Coimbatore Lok Sabha constituency in the 9th and 10th Lok Sabha elections winning in 1989 and 1991. In 1989 he defeated R. Umanath and in 1991, he defeated K. Ramani, both CPI(M) candidates. In 1996, he lost to DMK's M. Ramanathan. In 1999, he shifted to TMC(M) party and contested from Gobichettipalayam. He finished third after AIADMK (winner) and DMK. In September 2018, he joined Pattali Makkal Katchi.
