= Coimbatore Lok Sabha constituency =

Parliamentary constituency in Tamil Nadu, India

Coordinates: 11.0°N 77.0°E

Coimbatore
- Lok Sabha constituency
- Interactive map of Coimbatore Loksabha constituency, post-2008 delimitation

Constituency details
- Country: India
- Region: South India
- State: Tamil Nadu
- Assembly constituencies: Palladam; Sulur; Kavundampalayam; Coimbatore North; Coimbatore South; Singanallur
- Established: 2009
- Total electors: 21,04,577
- Reservation: None

Member of Parliament
- 18th Lok Sabha
- Incumbent Ganapathi P. Rajkumar
- Party: DMK
- Alliance: None
- Elected year: 2024

Coimbatore is a Lok Sabha constituency in western Tamil Nadu, India. Its Tamil Nadu Parliamentary Constituency number is 20 of 39. It is the second-largest city of Tamil Nadu and the district headquarters of the Coimbatore district. This Coimbatore Lok Saba Constituency having third largest number of voters after Sriperumbudur and Chennai South.

== Assembly segments ==
=== 2009-present ===
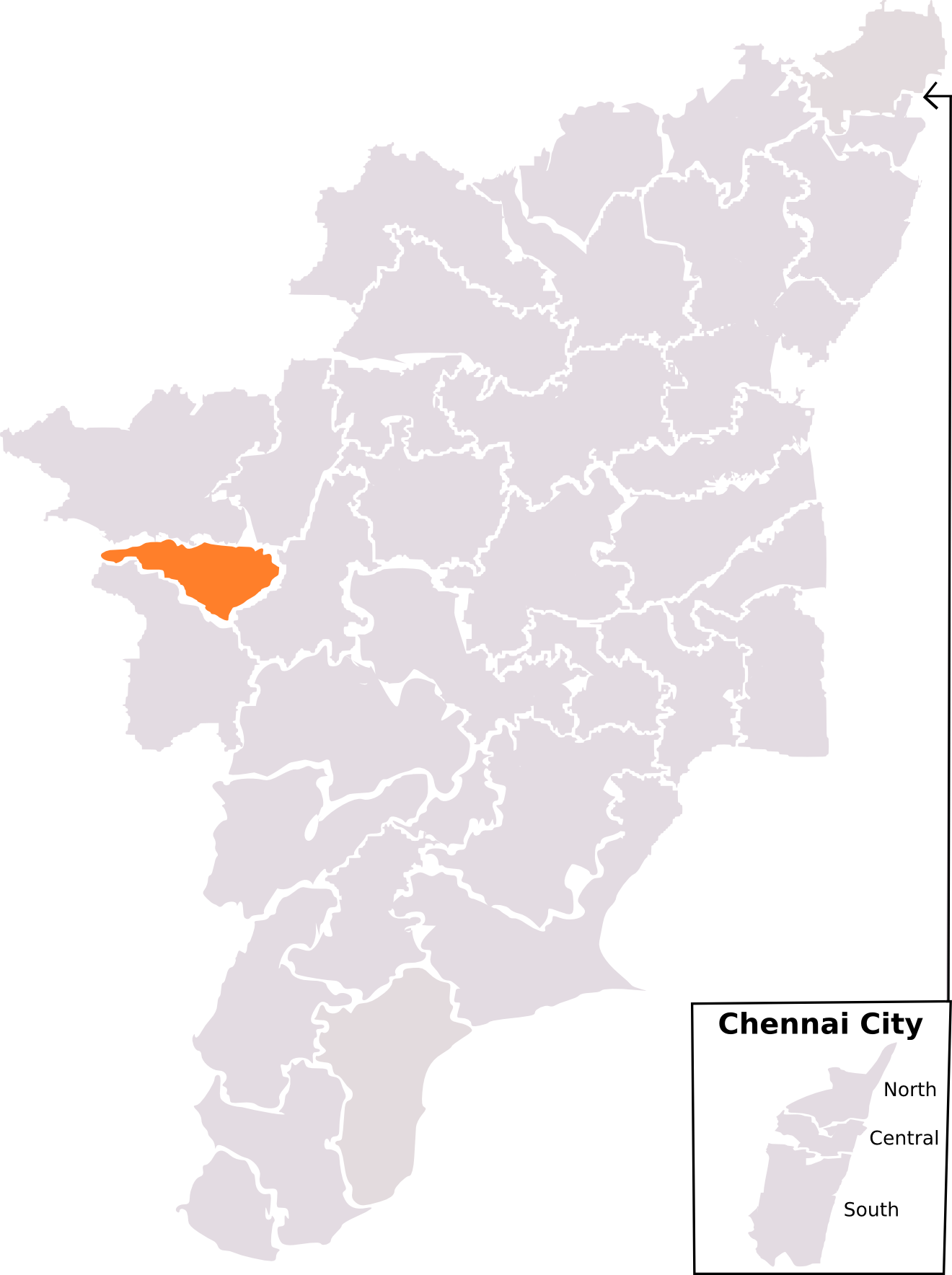
Coimbatore constituency as laid out by 2008 Delimitation

Constituency number	Name	Reserved for (SC/ST/None)	District	Party	2024 Lead
115	Palladam	None	Tiruppur	TVK	DMK
116	Sulur	None	Coimbatore	TVK	DMK
117	Kavundampalayam	None	Coimbatore	TVK	DMK
118	Coimbatore North	None	Coimbatore	TVK	DMK
120	Coimbatore South	None	Coimbatore	DMK	DMK
121	Singanallur	None	Coimbatore	TVK	DMK

Before delimitation in 2009, it consisted of the following constituencies:

1. Coimbatore West (defunct)
2. Coimbatore East (defunct)
3. Perur (defunct)
4. Singanallur
5. Palladam
6. Tiruppur (defunct)

== Members of the Parliament ==
Year	Member	Party
1952	T. A. Ramalingam Chettiar	Indian National Congress
1952^	N. M. Lingam	Indian National Congress
1957	Parvathi Krishnan	Communist Party of India
1962	P. R. Ramakrishnan	Indian National Congress
1967	K. Ramani	Communist Party of India (Marxist)
1971	K. Baladhandayutham	Communist Party of India
1974^	Parvathi Krishnan	Communist Party of India
1977	Parvathi Krishnan	Communist Party of India
1980	Era Mohan	Dravida Munnetra Kazhagam
1984	C. K. Kuppuswamy	Indian National Congress
1989	C. K. Kuppuswamy	Indian National Congress
1991	C. K. Kuppuswamy	Indian National Congress
1996	M. Ramanathan	Dravida Munnetra Kazhagam
1998	C. P. Radhakrishnan	Bharatiya Janata Party
1999	C. P. Radhakrishnan	Bharatiya Janata Party
2004	K. Subbarayan	Communist Party of India
2009	P. R. Natarajan	Communist Party of India (Marxist)
2014	P. Nagarajan	All India Anna Dravida Munnetra Kazhagam
2019	P. R. Natarajan	Communist Party of India (Marxist)
2024	Ganapathi P. Rajkumar	Dravida Munnetra Kazhagam

^ By Poll

== Election results ==
Vote share of Winning candidates
2024	41.39%
2019	45.85%
2014	37.24%
2009	35.64%
2004	57.46%
1999	49.21%
1998	55.85%
1996	56.79%
1991	58.67%
1989	56.68%
1984	57.77%
1980	54.29%
1977	52.06%
1971	53.05%
1967	57.93%
1962	39.06%
1957	47.76%

=== General Elections 2024 ===
2024 Indian general election: Coimbatore
Party	Candidate	Votes	%	±%
DMK	Ganapathi P. Rajkumar	568,200	41.39	New
BJP	K. Annamalai	450,132	32.79	▲1.32
AIADMK	Singai G. Ramachandran	236,490	17.23	New
NTK	Kalamani Jeganathan	82,657	6.02	▲1.16
NOTA	None of the Above	11,788	0.86	▼1.00
Margin of victory		118,068	8.60	▼5.78
Turnout				
DMK gain from CPI(M)		Swing		

=== General Elections 2019 ===
2019 Indian general election: Coimbatore
Party	Candidate	Votes	%	±%
CPI(M)	P. R. Natarajan	571,150	45.85	+42.90
BJP	C. P. Radhakrishnan	392,007	31.47	−2.15
MNM	R. Mahendran	145,104	11.65	
NTK	S. Kalyana Sundaram	60,519	4.86	
Independent	N. R. Appathurai	38,061	3.06	
NOTA	None of the above	23,190	1.86	0.36
Margin of victory		179,143	14.38	10.76
Turnout		1,245,644	63.86	−3.80
Registered electors		1,958,904		13.88
CPI(M) gain from AIADMK		Swing	+8.60	

=== General Elections 2014 ===
2014 Indian general election: Coimbatore
Party	Candidate	Votes	%	±%
AIADMK	P. Nagarajan	431,717	37.24	
BJP	C. P. Radhakrishnan	3,89,701	33.62	+29.01
DMK	K. Ganeshkumar	2,17,083	18.73	
INC	R. Prabhu	56,962	4.91	−26.03
CPI(M)	P. R. Natarajan	34,197	2.95	−32.69
NOTA	None of the above	17,428	1.50	
AAP	Pon. Chandran	6,680	0.58	
Margin of victory		42,016	3.62	−1.08
Turnout		11,59,192	68.40	−3.29
Registered electors		17,20,221		+47.81
AIADMK gain from CPI(M)		Swing	1.60	

=== General Elections 2009 ===
2009 Indian general election: Coimbatore
Party	Candidate	Votes	%	±%
CPI(M)	P. R. Natarajan	293,165	35.64	
INC	R. Prabhu	2,54,501	30.94	
KNMK	E. R. Eswaran	1,28,070	15.57	
DMDK	R. Pandian	73,188	8.90	
BJP	G. K. S. Selvakumar	37,909	4.61	−34.13
Margin of victory		38,664	4.70	−14.02
Turnout		8,22,566	70.81	15.20
Registered electors		11,63,781		−26.54
CPI(M) gain from CPI		Swing	-21.82	

=== General Elections 2004 ===
2004 Indian general election: Coimbatore
Party	Candidate	Votes	%	±%
CPI	K. Subbarayan	504,981	57.46	
BJP	C. P. Radhakrishnan	3,40,476	38.74	−10.47
Independent	S. Vellingiri	11,562	1.32	
BSP	A. Noor Muhamad	4,484	0.51	
SS	Moogambikai Mani	4,437	0.50	
Margin of victory		1,64,505	18.72	12.53
Turnout		8,78,866	55.51	−0.15
Registered electors		15,84,223		0.81
CPI gain from BJP		Swing	8.25	

=== General Elections 1999 ===
1999 Indian general election: Coimbatore
Party	Candidate	Votes	%	±%
BJP	C. P. Radhakrishnan	430,068	49.21	43.91
CPI	R. Nallakannu	3,75,991	43.02	
TMC(M)	S. R. Balasubramaniam	45,205	5.17	
Independent	R. Lakshmana Narayanan	9,502	1.09	
Margin of victory		54,077	6.19	−11.80
Turnout		8,74,020	55.63	−8.77
Registered electors		15,71,475		5.09
BJP hold		Swing	-7.59	

=== General Elections 1998 ===
1998 Indian general election: Coimbatore
Party	Candidate	Votes	%	±%
BJP	C. P. Radhakrishnan	449,269	55.85	
DMK	K. R. Subbian	3,04,593	37.86	
INC	R. Krishnan	40,739	5.06	
BSP	S. T. Kalyanasundaram	4,596	0.57	
Margin of victory		1,44,676	17.98	−14.19
Turnout		8,04,485	55.28	−9.12
Registered electors		14,95,356		13.53
BJP gain from DMK		Swing	-0.95	

=== General Elections 1996 ===
1996 Indian general election: Coimbatore
Party	Candidate	Votes	%	±%
DMK	M. Ramanathan	463,807	56.79	
INC	C. K. Kuppuswamy	2,01,020	24.61	−34.05
CPI(M)	P. R. Natarajan	85,355	10.45	−21.52
BJP	K. S. Natarajan	43,289	5.30	−1.48
Margin of victory		2,62,787	32.18	5.48
Turnout		8,16,665	64.40	3.54
Registered electors		13,17,120		11.71
DMK gain from INC		Swing	-1.88	

=== General Elections 1991 ===
1991 Indian general election: Coimbatore
Party	Candidate	Votes	%	±%
INC	C. K. Kuppuswamy	408,891	58.67	1.99
CPI(M)	K. Ramani	2,22,827	31.97	−6.10
BJP	V. Narayanan	47,267	6.78	3.44
IUML	A. Abeeb Rahman	3,381	0.49	
Margin of victory		1,86,064	26.70	8.09
Turnout		6,96,942	60.86	−4.09
Registered electors		11,79,032		0.44
INC hold		Swing	1.99	

=== General Elections 1989 ===
1989 Indian general election: Coimbatore
Party	Candidate	Votes	%	±%
INC	C. K. Kuppuswamy	426,721	56.68	−1.10
CPI(M)	R. Umanath	2,86,653	38.07	−3.04
BJP	V. Narayanan	25,132	3.34	
Margin of victory		1,40,068	18.60	1.94
Turnout		7,52,918	64.95	−6.37
Registered electors		11,73,906		30.03
INC hold		Swing	-1.10	

=== General Elections 1984 ===
1984 Indian general election: Coimbatore
Party	Candidate	Votes	%	±%
INC	C. A. Balakrishnan	355,525	57.77	
CPI(M)	R. Umanath	2,53,006	41.11	
Independent	J. Stephen	6,834	1.11	
Margin of victory		1,02,519	16.66	5.66
Turnout		6,15,365	71.32	5.25
Registered electors		9,02,773		14.96
INC gain from DMK		Swing	3.48	

=== General Elections 1980 ===
1980 Indian general election: Coimbatore
Party	Candidate	Votes	%	±%
DMK	R. Ram Mohan Alias Era Mohan	276,975	54.29	
CPI	Parvathi Krishnan	2,20,866	43.29	
INC(U)	K. Ramalingam	4,219	0.83	
Independent	B. Rajan Alias Rajagopal	3,166	0.62	
Margin of victory		56,109	11.00	6.88
Turnout		5,10,166	66.06	−4.33
Registered electors		7,85,260		5.65
DMK gain from CPI		Swing	2.23	

=== General Elections 1977 ===
1977 Indian general election: Coimbatore
Party	Candidate	Votes	%	±%
CPI	Parvathi Krishnan	267,424	52.06	
INC(O)	K. C. Palanisamy	2,46,246	47.94	
Margin of victory		21,178	4.12	−14.90
Turnout		5,13,670	70.39	2.91
Registered electors		7,43,258		17.68
CPI hold		Swing	-0.98	

=== General Elections 1971 ===
1971 Indian general election: Coimbatore
Party	Candidate	Votes	%	±%
CPI	K. Baladhandayutham	214,824	53.05	
INC(O)	Ramaswamy	1,37,771	34.02	
CPI(M)	K. Ramani	52,388	12.94	
Margin of victory		77,053	19.03	3.17
Turnout		4,04,983	67.48	−8.69
Registered electors		6,31,568		12.56
CPI gain from CPI(M)		Swing	-4.88	

=== General Elections 1967 ===
1967 Indian general election: Coimbatore
Party	Candidate	Votes	%	±%
CPI(M)	K. Ramani	240,856	57.93	
INC	N. Mahalingam	1,74,935	42.07	3.01
Margin of victory		65,921	15.85	4.85
Turnout		4,15,791	76.18	−1.90
Registered electors		5,61,096		10.05
CPI(M) gain from INC		Swing	18.87	

=== General Elections 1962 ===
1962 Indian general election: Coimbatore
Party	Candidate	Votes	%	±%
INC	P. R. Ramakrishnan	151,019	39.06	−2.21
CPI	Parvathi Krishnan	1,08,458	28.05	
SWA	K. Sundaram	74,932	19.38	
DMK	Somasundaram	41,724	10.79	
SLP	V. N. Arunachyalam	7,516	1.94	
Independent	S. Arumugham	2,977	0.77	
Margin of victory		42,561	11.01	4.52
Turnout		3,86,626	78.08	28.06
Registered electors		5,09,869		10.29
INC gain from CPI		Swing	-8.70	

=== General Elections 1957 ===
1957 Indian general election: Coimbatore
Party	Candidate	Votes	%	±%
CPI	Parvathi Krishnan	110,454	47.76	
INC	P. S. Rangasami	95,442	41.27	
Independent	Palanisami	25,349	10.96	
Margin of victory		15,012	6.49	
Turnout		2,31,245	50.02	50.02
Registered electors		4,62,294		33.45
CPI gain from INC		Swing		

=== General Elections 1951 ===
1951–52 Indian general election: Coimbatore
Party	Candidate	Votes	%	±%
INC	T. A. Ramalingam	Unopposed		
Registered electors		3,46,405		
INC win (new seat)				

== See also ==
- Coimbatore
- Coimbatore East Assembly constituency
- Coimbatore West Assembly constituency
- List of constituencies of the Lok Sabha
