= N.K. Krishnan =

Indian politician

Narayana Kalyan Krishnan

Indian ambassador to Yugoslavia
- In office 1981–1981
- Preceded by: Ashoke Sen Chib
- Succeeded by: es:Aravinda Ramachandra Deo

Member of Parliament for Rajya Sabha
- In office 27 May 1970 – 1 August 1974
- Constituency: Nominated

Personal details
- Born: 12 April 1913
- Died: 24 November 1992 (aged 79)

N. K. Krishnan (12 April 1913 – 24 November 1992) was an Indian politician. He belonged to the Communist Party of India. He was the husband of Indian politician Parvathi Krishnan, the only daughter of P. Subbarayan.

== Biography ==
=== Early life and education ===
NK Krishnan was born on 12 April 1913 in a middle-class family in Nadavaramba village in the princely state of Cochin, later part of Kerala, in ‘Cherayathu Madom’, a huge rambling house with extensive banana and coconut tree plantations. His father was N.D. Narayana Iyer. Later his parents shifted to Trichur and then to Ernakulam in 1918. Entering school at five, Krishnan became outstanding student, standing first throughout his school and college days.

Krishnan stood first in class IV in Cochin state in scholarship exams and was awarded a medal. Shifting to Chittur (Palghat) in 1922, he was admitted to Chittur High School. He read a range of English literary authors from Keats to Shelley and Shakespeare, also Sanskrit, and developing an interest in Carnatic music and tennis.

Completing his school education in Wadakkancheri in 1926, he topped SSLC securing highest marks in Cochin state. He joined St Thomas College, Trichur and later Maharaja's College, Ernakulam. He passed intermediate in 1930, standing first in the whole of Madras Presidency.

He entered Presidency College, Madras in 1930 in MA Mathematics.

=== Contact with politics ===
Students in the college hoisted national flag in 1929 led by HV Kamath. All India protest day was observed in college in 1930, which Principal tried to prevent. The so-called ‘Hotel de Pitchu’ became their meeting joint to discuss things. By 1934 he was under the influence of Rabindra Nath Tagore.

=== In England ===
After MA parents sent him to England for advanced studies preparing for ICS. In September 1934 he left for England in SS Naldera. He stayed in Indian Students’ Hostel, Tilbury, and later as paying guest in different places. He joined London School of Economics (LSE). He also had the opportunity to travel the Nordic and other countries.

=== Joining Communist movement ===
Mid 1930s was a period of anti-fascist upsurge in Europe and England. Krishnan was a regular visitor to the Reading Room, meeting many Communists. He became a voracious reader of Marxist literature, soon coming in contact with Communist Party of Great Britain (CPGB), becoming active in it. He became a regular reader of the Daily Worker and Labour Monthly and read R. Palme Dutt's ‘Notes of the Month’ regularly. He came in contact with a whole galaxy of intellectuals, economists, scientists and historians.

Because of anti-Communist leanings of the Principal, he changed his college, and studied hydrodynamics under Prof Hyman Levy, who had a soft corner for Communists and they both got on very well.

Krishnan was rejected for ICS due to his Communist views. While on a fortnight's tour of the Wales, he saw how coal miners lived in extreme destitution and poverty.

He was active in India League led by V. K. Krishna Menon. Krishnan came in contact with CPGB leaders such as Harry Pollitt, R. Palme Dutt, Ben Bradley, James Klugmann, Michael Carritt, Emile Burns, William Gallacher, etc. Carritt was an ICS officer in Bengal earlier, and helped freedom movement and Indian communists. Later he resigned and joined CPGB.

He was first arrested in England on Coronation Day in 1935 while selling CPGB paper Daily Worker.

He became secretary of party branch of Indian Communists. Paul Robeson, Nehru and others visited London, and he met them. Krishnan participated in international student conferences in Paris in the 1930s, along with Yusuf Meherally, Parvati, P. N. Haksar, K. T. Chandy, and others.

Krishnan knew French and as such got access to FCP and other literature. He read Gabriel Peri, Jacques Duclos, Maurice Thorez, Marcel Cachin and others. Krishnan worked for ‘National Front’, the CPI organ, and organized party schools, worked in Majlis and FEDIND. ‘National Front’ circulation increased to 300. Party branch included Bhupesh Gupta, Haksar, Nikhil, Renu, Jyoti Basu and many others. Feroze Gandhi and Indira Gandhi were also there. In the India League he met Fenner Brockway, Stafford Cripps and others, as also K. T. K. Thangamani.

NK met Parvati Kumarmanagalam in November 1938 in Oxford.

=== Return to India ===
With Second World War looming, NK left for India in June 1939. Michael Carritt gave him party credentials from CPGB to CPI and some reports. He reached Bombay on 17 July 1939, and the customs failed to locate any documents on his person.

Krishnan met P. C. Joshi, who talked for a long time. He joined the CC headquarters as a fulltimer. He stayed with Chari family: ASR and Dilshad.

Krishnan prepared a comprehensive Marxist study syllabus for central staff of PHQ, and delivered lectures. One young student Virsukh Pandya, helped him in every way. He died very young in 1942. Krishnan then stayed in the ‘den’ of Ajoy Ghosh, and he moved to Adhikari's den in 1940, where Katdare and DP Sinha also stayed. Govind Vidyarthi was also around.

There started DA strikes in 1940 and NK came to know leaders like Tambitkar, Patkar, Md Shaheed, Parvatibai, Bhogale and others.

Krishnan and others were first sent to Byculla Jail in most horrible conditions. From there they were shifted to Nasik. A party committee was formed in jail with Sardesai and Krishnan as secretaries. There were over 200 Congress detenus too, on most cordial relations with Communists. Jalaluddin Bukhari conducted classes in Urdu.

NK was released on 28 April 1942. He helped organize AISF and BSU (Bombay Students’ Union), and cooperated with Nergis Batlivala and others. He also met C. Rajagopalachari (Rajaji) and had long discussions.

=== Reorganizing party in Madras Province ===
Krishnan was in Salem in June 1942 to help organize the conference of AISF of southern region, along with Parvati, S. Ramakrishnan and Parameswaran. There were some of the leaders released at that time which included Subramania Sharma, Mohan Kumaramangalam, B. Srinivasa Rao, others. P. C. Joshi entrusted Krishnan and P. Subbarayan with reorganizing provincial committee. NK and others were housed in the large ancestral home of Dr P. Subbarayan in Tiruchengodu. Radhabai Subbarayan made all necessary arrangements.

The distinguished Subbarayans had made massive contributions to the country including in politics, music, army, Communist movement etc. Radhabai attended Round Table Conference, and was first woman ever in the Central Assembly. Dr Subbarayan became chief minister of Madras. Parvati and Mohan were their two children.

It was here that Krishnan and Parvati decided to get married, which they did on 7 December 1942 in Raj Bhavan, Bombay.

On return to Bombay, NK was coopted to the CC of CPI.

=== 1942 Movement ===
Krishnan was present at Gowalia Tank Maidan, Bombay, on 8 August 1942 when Quit India Movement was announced. Later Communists were accused of collaborating with the British, and PCJ of secretly meeting Home Secretary Reginald Maxwell. N.K. Krishnan wrote an effective pamphlet proving the so-called ‘Maxwell Letter’ to be a forgery.

=== War years and Party Commune ===
The Commune set up in Raj Bhavan, Bombay, at the initiative of PCJ, played an important part in CPI history, and NK and Parvati were part of it. It housed central offices, Polit Buro, CC, newspapers, library etc. NK and others would collect second hand clothes to meet the shortage of personal funds, wages being inadequate.

Prominent national and international personalities visited the Commune including Subbarayan, Rajaji, Uday Shankar, Vallathol, Edgar Snow, Margaret Bourke White of Life magazine, and Betty Collier of Colliers magazine.

N.K. Krishnan was elected CC member at first congress of CPI held in Bombay in 1943. He also moved an important resolution greeting the Red Army and Soviet people.

=== In Madras presidency ===
From 1943 to 1947 NK helped CPI unite and grow in Madras Presidency, bringing together C.S. Subramaniam, Manali Kandaswami, Srinivasa Rao and others as a team.

NK also visited Golden Rock in March 1943 with Parvati and took extensive classes and study circles in SIR Labor Union (railways). Party school for student comrades was also conducted in Srirangam. M.S. Krishnan, N.C. Srinivasan and M. C. Narasimhan also attended.

NK accompanied P.C. Joshi to Bihta (Bihar) conference of AIKS in 1942. He also looked after Friends of the Soviet Union, women's movement, AISF etc. NK met Prem Dhawan, Balraj, Prithvi Raj Kapoor, Ismat Chugtai and other prominent personalities in the course of work.

NK took an active part in guiding the RIN revolt of 1946.

=== Madurai conspiracy case, 1947 ===
About 100 top Communists were arrested throughout the Province in January 1947, including NK, Venkataraman, EMS, P. Ramamurthy, AKG, Moyaram, K. Murugesan, N Rajsekhara Reddy, etc. NK Krishnan was staying at Dr Subbarayan's place (Parvati's father), then home minister in the province. Police arrested NK at 2 am, but before that he succeeded in helping Subramania Sharma escape frombathroom.

He was released on 15 August 1947.

=== BTR period ===
NK described how BTR and others including NK himself pressed PCJ to adopt more ‘militant’ line since CC meeting of August 1946. By September 1947, when NK was released, inner-party struggle had sharpened, culminating in a sectarian adventurist line at second party congress, Calcutta, Feb-March 1948. Krishnan fully supported it. He was now in the 9-member Polit Buro.

Krishnan wrote that repudiating Leninist teachings on dual role of national bourgeoisie, party adopted infantile sectarianism and left adventurism, as if as an ‘occupational disease’! "Joshian reformism" was denounced as a ‘war cry’.

Krishnan writes: "Though PC Joshi was included in the official panel for the new central committee which had been proposed from the platform, he was voted out. This was done in an underhand manner..." NK says ‘Joshi period’ was a glorious period.

After return from party congress, Krishnan went to see a film to relax. Suddenly his photo was flashed on the screen announcing a reward. He froze on his seat. He simply disappeared after the lights went out.

Underground provincial committee meeting was held in April 1948 outside Madras. One day, he ran away while in delirium with pneumonia after seeing Mysore Special Police (MSP) van. He stayed secretly in his father-in-law's house, home minister at the time. After admission in hospital, Dr Srinivasan managed his escape through the morgue. Krishnan's little daughter ‘Indi’ was instrumental in ‘reporting’ his presence in Moscow. The report found its way into intelligence files, becoming a subject of enquiries including by home minister. All the while NK was in India!

NK was suspended from Polit Buro in 1950 with four others including BTR. Due to TB and other ailments, he and Parvati spent months in Hazaribagh, and later in Kalimpong. He was accused No. 1 in Trichy Conspiracy Case, and remained underground till 1952.

=== After 1952 ===
After working underground in Kerala, NK finally settled down in Coimbatore in May 1953, organizing industrial workers, particularly textile workers. To make a living, he and Parvati opened an evening school for worker-students preparing for Matric. He also took up private tuitions. Parvati took up part-time lectureship.

He was elected a vice-president of AITUC. He was also on the general council of the WFTU. He was a state party secretariat member from 1960 to 64.

NK was elected to National Council of CPI in 1961.

In 1964 he shifted to CPI headquarters in New Delhi. He was elected to party's CEC and secretariat, heading party's International Department. He was member of Rajya Sabha for four years from 1970.

=== Specialist in international affairs ===
NK Krishnan was a specialist in international affairs, and represented CPI in several world conferences. He was involved, as member of CPI delegation, in the preparation of world Communist conference of 1969 in Moscow. He met several figures including Alexei Kosygin of CPSU. He attended congresses of a large number of CPs. He reported to NC of CPI on world events. NK made a flag-hoisting speech at CPI congress in Calcutta in 1989.

NK Krishnan died on 2 November 1992 in Coimbatore.

== Union leader ==
- In 1953 he was leader of the All India Trade Union Congress and called for a general strike.
- In 1958 he was President of the Coimbatore Mill Workers' Union, with a membership of 16,000.

== Politics ==
Krishnan joined the Communist Party of India (Kerala) and rose to become an important leader in the party. He was nominated to the Rajya Sabha in 1970 and served as a member of the Rajya Sabha from 10 November 1970 to 2 April 1974.

== Family ==
In 1942, Krishnan married Parvathi, the only daughter of P. Subbarayan.
