= Coimbatore East Assembly constituency =

Former legislative assembly constituency in Tamil Nadu, India

Coordinates: 11.020°N 77.030°E

Coimbatore (East)
- Former constituency for the Tamil Nadu Legislative Assembly

Constituency details
- Country: India
- Region: South India
- State: Tamil Nadu
- District: Coimbatore
- Established: 1967
- Abolished: 2008
- Total electors: 1,57,364
- Reservation: None

Coimbatore East was a legislative assembly constituency in the Indian state of Tamil Nadu. It covered parts of Coimbatore. Coimbatore East Assembly constituency was a part of Coimbatore Lok Sabha constituency. After the 2008 delimitation, this constituency became defunct.

== Members of the Legislative Assembly ==
| Year | Name | Party |
|---|---|---|
| 1952 | C. Subramaniam | Indian National Congress |
| 1957 | Marudachalam | Communist Party of India |
| 1957 | Palaniswami | Indian National Congress |
| 1962 | K. P. Palanisamy | Indian National Congress |
| 1967 | M. Bhupathy | Communist Party of India (Marxist) |
| Fifth | K. Ranganathan | Dravida Munnetra Kazhagam |
| Sixth | K. Ramani | Communist Party of India (Marxist) |
| Seventh | K. Ramani | Communist Party of India (Marxist) |
| Eighth | K. Ramani | Communist Party of India (Marxist) |
| Ninth | K. Ramani | Communist Party of India (Marxist) |
| Tenth | V. K. Lakshmanan | Indian National Congress |
| Eleventh | V. K. Lakshmanan | Tamil Maanila Congress |
| Twelfth | V. K. Lakshmanan | Tamil Maanila Congress |
| Thirteenth | N. Pongalur Palanisamy | Dravida Munnetra Kazhagam |

== Election results ==
=== 2006 ===
2006 Tamil Nadu Legislative Assembly election: Coimbatore (East)
| Party | Candidate | Votes | % | ±% |
|---|---|---|---|---|
| DMK | Pongalur Palanisamy | 51,827 | 47.50% | |
| AIADMK | Gopalakrishnan. V. | 45,491 | 41.70% | |
| DMDK | Mary. G. | 7,886 | 7.23% | |
| BJP | Shanmugam. K. | 2,651 | 2.43% | −43.76% |
| Independent | Ramamoorthy. P. M. | 424 | 0.39% | |
| JD(U) | Anbuselvam. S. B. | 415 | 0.38% | |
| BSP | Subramanian. P. | 205 | 0.19% | |
| Independent | Sivarajasekaran. P. | 204 | 0.19% | |
| Margin of victory | | 6,336 | 5.81% | 1.93% |
| Turnout | | 1,09,103 | 69.33% | 17.33% |
| Registered electors | | 1,57,364 | | |
| DMK gain from TMC(M) | | Swing | -2.57% | |

=== 2001 ===
2001 Tamil Nadu Legislative Assembly election: Coimbatore (East)
| Party | Candidate | Votes | % | ±% |
|---|---|---|---|---|
| TMC(M) | Lakshmanan V. K. | 41,419 | 50.08% | −18.73% |
| BJP | Nanjappan N. R. | 38,208 | 46.19% | 42.30% |
| JD(S) | Balan. K. B. | 1,783 | 2.16% | |
| Independent | Ravi P | 692 | 0.84% | |
| Independent | Manickam N | 324 | 0.39% | |
| Independent | Padmanapan . K. | 285 | 0.34% | |
| Margin of victory | | 3,211 | 3.88% | −49.16% |
| Turnout | | 82,711 | 52.00% | −8.16% |
| Registered electors | | 1,59,063 | | |
| TMC(M) hold | | Swing | -18.73% | |

=== 1996 ===
1996 Tamil Nadu Legislative Assembly election: Coimbatore (East)
| Party | Candidate | Votes | % | ±% |
|---|---|---|---|---|
| TMC(M) | V. K. Lakshmanan | 61,860 | 68.81% | |
| INC | R. S. Velan | 14,174 | 15.77% | −39.79% |
| CPI(M) | K. C. Karunakaran | 8,523 | 9.48% | −25.16% |
| BJP | N. Soundaraj | 3,500 | 3.89% | −2.40% |
| Independent | K. B. Balan | 332 | 0.37% | |
| IC(S) | Venugopal | 282 | 0.31% | |
| ATMK | M. Guruswamy | 248 | 0.28% | |
| Independent | S. Sounderrajan | 179 | 0.20% | |
| SS | C. N. Ravishankar | 126 | 0.14% | |
| Independent | P. Rajendran | 91 | 0.10% | |
| Independent | G. Krishnamoorthy | 73 | 0.08% | |
| Margin of victory | | 47,686 | 53.04% | 32.12% |
| Turnout | | 89,906 | 60.16% | 7.78% |
| Registered electors | | 1,53,644 | | |
| TMC(M) gain from INC | | Swing | 13.25% | |

=== 1991 ===
1991 Tamil Nadu Legislative Assembly election: Coimbatore (East)
| Party | Candidate | Votes | % | ±% |
|---|---|---|---|---|
| INC | Lakshmanan V. K. | 46,544 | 55.56% | 24.79% |
| CPI(M) | Karunakaran K. C. | 29,019 | 34.64% | −4.67% |
| BJP | Bhupathy G. | 5,275 | 6.30% | |
| JP | Geetha K. S. | 1,151 | 1.37% | |
| Tamilar Desiya Iyakkam | Gandhi A. | 185 | 0.22% | |
| Independent | Rajasekaran C. | 149 | 0.18% | |
| PMK | Abdul Kareem H. | 130 | 0.16% | |
| Independent | Balan K. B. | 118 | 0.14% | |
| Independent | Rajendran G. | 100 | 0.12% | |
| Independent | Nanjappan C. M. | 99 | 0.12% | |
| Independent | Anthonyaraj R. | 98 | 0.12% | |
| Margin of victory | | 17,525 | 20.92% | 12.38% |
| Turnout | | 83,780 | 52.38% | −14.52% |
| Registered electors | | 1,62,322 | | |
| INC gain from CPI(M) | | Swing | 16.25% | |

=== 1989 ===
1989 Tamil Nadu Legislative Assembly election: Coimbatore (East)
| Party | Candidate | Votes | % | ±% |
|---|---|---|---|---|
| CPI(M) | Ramani. K. | 37,397 | 39.31% | −8.83% |
| INC | Ramakrishnan. E. | 29,272 | 30.77% | |
| AIADMK | Malaravan. T. | 14,727 | 15.48% | −31.41% |
| AIADMK | Manimaran. V.R. | 8,799 | 9.25% | −37.65% |
| Independent | Gopal. P.N. | 1,751 | 1.84% | |
| Independent | Balan. K.B. | 1,065 | 1.12% | |
| Independent | Kalimuthu. R. | 761 | 0.80% | |
| Independent | Komahan | 313 | 0.33% | |
| Independent | Kalidass. M.P. | 174 | 0.18% | |
| Independent | Manitharachalam. K. | 160 | 0.17% | |
| Independent | Muthuswamy. K. | 154 | 0.16% | |
| Margin of victory | | 8,125 | 8.54% | 7.29% |
| Turnout | | 95,142 | 66.90% | 2.79% |
| Registered electors | | 1,44,236 | | |
| CPI(M) hold | | Swing | -8.83% | |

=== 1984 ===
1984 Tamil Nadu Legislative Assembly election: Coimbatore (East)
| Party | Candidate | Votes | % | ±% |
|---|---|---|---|---|
| CPI(M) | Ramani K. | 40,891 | 48.14% | 2.75% |
| AIADMK | Kovai Thambi | 39,832 | 46.89% | |
| Independent | Jagadeesan P. V. | 1,485 | 1.75% | |
| Independent | Mariaselvam Anthonisamy. P. | 543 | 0.64% | |
| Independent | Rajan C. | 409 | 0.48% | |
| Independent | Sundareswaran N. | 302 | 0.36% | |
| Independent | Narayanaswamy. G. P | 292 | 0.34% | |
| Independent | Chandrasekaran | 249 | 0.29% | |
| Independent | Ramasamy. M. | 217 | 0.26% | |
| Independent | Jayachandran A. | 189 | 0.22% | |
| Independent | Subbian. R. A. | 154 | 0.18% | |
| Margin of victory | | 1,059 | 1.25% | 1.07% |
| Turnout | | 84,941 | 64.11% | 10.80% |
| Registered electors | | 1,37,305 | | |
| CPI(M) hold | | Swing | 2.75% | |

=== 1980 ===
1980 Tamil Nadu Legislative Assembly election: Coimbatore (East)
| Party | Candidate | Votes | % | ±% |
|---|---|---|---|---|
| CPI(M) | Ramani. K. | 33,666 | 45.39% | 14.85% |
| INC | Ganga Nair | 33,533 | 45.21% | 24.84% |
| JP | Venkatachalam. K. R. | 5,406 | 7.29% | |
| BJP | Ramani Kumar. G. | 870 | 1.17% | |
| Independent | Marudachala. V. | 358 | 0.48% | |
| Independent | Nadai Mannan Parthasarathy. N. | 182 | 0.25% | |
| Independent | Arunan. K. | 157 | 0.21% | |
| Margin of victory | | 133 | 0.18% | −2.78% |
| Turnout | | 74,172 | 53.30% | −3.22% |
| Registered electors | | 1,40,417 | | |
| CPI(M) hold | | Swing | 14.85% | |

=== 1977 ===
1977 Tamil Nadu Legislative Assembly election: Coimbatore (East)
| Party | Candidate | Votes | % | ±% |
|---|---|---|---|---|
| CPI(M) | K. Ramani | 20,803 | 30.54% | |
| DMK | K. Aranganathan | 18,784 | 27.58% | −19.14% |
| JP | K.R. Venkatachalam | 14,049 | 20.63% | |
| INC | S. Ramaswamy | 13,877 | 20.37% | −21.05% |
| Independent | K. Palaniswamy | 407 | 0.60% | |
| Independent | K.K. Vadivelu | 194 | 0.28% | |
| Margin of victory | | 2,019 | 2.96% | −2.33% |
| Turnout | | 68,114 | 56.52% | −7.95% |
| Registered electors | | 1,21,664 | | |
| CPI(M) gain from DMK | | Swing | -16.17% | |

=== 1971 ===
1971 Tamil Nadu Legislative Assembly election: Coimbatore (East)
| Party | Candidate | Votes | % | ±% |
|---|---|---|---|---|
| DMK | K. Ranganathan | 31,003 | 46.71% | |
| INC | A. Devaraj | 27,491 | 41.42% | −0.72% |
| CPI(M) | M. Bupathy | 7,873 | 11.86% | |
| Margin of victory | | 3,512 | 5.29% | −3.37% |
| Turnout | | 66,367 | 64.47% | −8.26% |
| Registered electors | | 1,09,398 | | |
| DMK gain from CPI(M) | | Swing | -4.09% | |

=== 1967 ===
1967 Madras Legislative Assembly election: Coimbatore (East)
| Party | Candidate | Votes | % | ±% |
|---|---|---|---|---|
| CPI(M) | M. Bhupathy | 33,122 | 50.81% | |
| INC | G. R. Damodaran | 27,477 | 42.15% | |
| CPI | R. Rangaswamy | 4,595 | 7.05% | |
| Margin of victory | | 5,645 | 8.66% | |
| Turnout | | 65,194 | 72.73% | |
| Registered electors | | 92,200 | | |
| CPI(M) gain from INC | | Swing | | |

=== 1962 ===
1962 Madras Legislative Assembly election: Coimbatore II
| Party | Candidate | Votes | % | ±% |
|---|---|---|---|---|
| INC | K. P. Palanisamy | 32,313 | 37.38% | 15.15% |
| CPI | N. Marudachalam | 23,948 | 27.70% | |
| PSP | V. Nagaraj | 16,362 | 18.93% | |
| DMK | V. Petchimuthu | 11,628 | 13.45% | |
| Socialist Party (India) | V. Arumugam | 1,914 | 2.21% | |
| Independent | C. T. Subbiah | 280 | 0.32% | |
| Margin of victory | | 8,365 | 9.68% | 8.93% |
| Turnout | | 86,445 | 81.20% | −10.97% |
| Registered electors | | 1,09,764 | | |
| INC gain from CPI | | Swing | 14.40% | |

=== 1957 ===
1957 Madras Legislative Assembly election: Coimbatore II
| Party | Candidate | Votes | % | ±% |
|---|---|---|---|---|
| CPI | Marudachalam (Sc) | 38,929 | 22.98% | |
| INC | Palaniswami (Sc) | 37,662 | 22.23% | |
| INC | Kuppuswamy | 36,549 | 21.58% | |
| PSP | P. Veluswami | 33,188 | 19.59% | |
| Independent | Rajamanickkam | 12,636 | 7.46% | |
| Independent | Sadayappan | 10,435 | 6.16% | |
| Margin of victory | | 1,267 | 0.75% | |
| Turnout | | 1,69,399 | 92.17% | |
| Registered electors | | 1,83,799 | | |
| CPI gain from INC | | Swing | | |

=== 1952 ===
1952 Madras Legislative Assembly election: Coimbatore
| Party | Candidate | Votes | % | ±% |
|---|---|---|---|---|
| INC | C. Subramaniam | 21,406 | 43.46% | 43.46% |
| CPI | C. P. Kandaswami | 16,354 | 33.21% | |
| Independent | K. Venkataswami Naidu | 8,323 | 16.90% | |
| Socialist Party (India) | Kanakasabhapathy | 1,466 | 2.98% | |
| Independent | P. A. Natesan | 1,169 | 2.37% | |
| Independent | S. Narasimha Iyer | 533 | 1.08% | |
| Margin of victory | | 5,052 | 10.26% | |
| Turnout | | 49,251 | 65.06% | |
| Registered electors | | 75,701 | | |
| INC win (new seat) | | | | |
