= Savithiri =

Savithiri may refer to:

- Savithiri (1941 film), a 1941 Tamil language film
- Savithiri (1980 film), a 1980 Tamil language film

It is also an Indian given name. Notable people with the name include:

- Savithri Lakshmanan, an Indian National Congress politician
- Savithiri Shanmugam (1913 - ?), an Indian National Congress politician
