= Sulur Assembly constituency =

One of the 234 State Legislative Assembly Constituencies in Tamil Nadu in India

Coordinates: 11.0248594°N 77.1046683°E

Sulur
- Constituency No. 116 for the Tamil Nadu Legislative Assembly

Constituency details
- Country: India
- Region: South India
- State: Tamil Nadu
- District: Coimbatore
- Lok Sabha constituency: Coimbatore
- Established: 1956 (first establishment); 2008 (second establishment)
- Total electors: 3,07,699
- Reservation: None

Member of Legislative Assembly
- 17th Tamil Nadu Legislative Assembly
- Incumbent NM. Sukumar
- Party: TVK
- Alliance: TVK+
- Elected year: 2026

Sulur (Tamil: சூலூர்) is a legislative assembly constituency in the Indian state of Tamil Nadu. Its State Assembly Constituency number is 116. It comprises the Town Panchayat of Irugur, Kannampalayam, Mopperipalayam, Pallapalayam, Samalapuram and Sulur. It also has Karumathapatti municipality and Village Panchayat of Sulur Block and Sultanpet Block surrounding areas in Coimbatore. It was formed for the second time in 2008 and is part of Coimbatore Lok Sabha constituency. It is one of the 234 State Legislative Assembly Constituencies in Tamil Nadu.

== Members of Legislative Assembly ==
Term	Winner	Party
Madras
1957	C. Kolandai Ammal	Indian National Congress
1962	C. Kolandai Ammal	Indian National Congress
Constituency did not exist (1967–2008)
Tamil Nadu
2011	K. Thinakaran	Desiya Murpokku Dravida Kazhagam
2016	R. Kanagaraj	All India Anna Dravida Munnetra Kazhagam
2019^	V. P. Kandasamy	All India Anna Dravida Munnetra Kazhagam
2021	V. P. Kandasamy	All India Anna Dravida Munnetra Kazhagam
2026	N. M. Sukumar	Tamilaga Vettri Kazhagam

== Election results ==
Vote share of winning candidates
2026	33.10%
2021	49.23%
2019 by-election	44.78%
2016	47.38%
2011	52.29%
1962	38.76%
1957	44.59%

=== 2026 ===
2026 Tamil Nadu Legislative Assembly election: Sulur
Party	Candidate	Votes	%	±%
TVK	NM. Sukumar	90,531	33.10	New
AIADMK	V.P. Kandasamy	85,741	31.34	▼17.89
DMK	Thalapathy Murugesan	83,654	30.58	New
NTK	Dr. S. Rajasekaran	10,147	3.71	▼2.26
NOTA	NOTA	1,353	0.49	▼0.59
Independent	Murugesh.R	437	0.16	New
Anna Puratchi Thalaivar Amma Dravida Munnetra Kazhagam	Kanthasamy.K	283	0.10	New
Independent	Kandasamy.R	271	0.10	New
All India Puratchi Thalaivar Makkal Munnetra Kazhagam	Pappa Muthulakshmi.P	216	0.08	New
TVK	Suman Singh.R	205	0.07	New
Party For The Rights Of Other Backward Classes	Palanisamy.M	156	0.06	New
Independent	Murugesan.N	139	0.05	New
Ganasangam Party of India	Nagaraj.K	137	0.05	New
Independent	Kandasamy.A	109	0.04	New
Independent	Kandasamy.V	90	0.03	New
Tamilaga Makkal Nala Katchi	Nelson.W	75	0.03	New
Margin of victory		4,790	1.76	▼11.45
Turnout		2,73,544	88.90	▲12.70
Registered electors		3,07,699		▼9,425
TVK gain from AIADMK		Swing	▲33.10	

=== 2021 ===
2021 Tamil Nadu Legislative Assembly election: Sulur
Party	Candidate	Votes	%	±%
AIADMK	V. P. Kandasamy	118,968	49.23%	
KMDK	Selvam Kalichamy M.	87,036	36.02%	
NTK	Elangovan. G	14,426	5.97%	
MNM	Ranganathan. A	12,658	5.24%	
AMMK	Senthil Kumar. S. A.	4,111	1.70%	
NOTA	Nota	2,610	1.08%	
Margin of victory		31,932	13.21%	−3.97%
Turnout		2,41,653	76.20%	0.60%
Rejected ballots		309	0.13%	
Registered electors		3,17,124		
AIADMK hold		Swing	1.85%	

=== 2019 by-election ===
2019 Tamil Nadu Legislative Assembly by-elections: Sulur
Party	Candidate	Votes	%	±%
AIADMK	V. P. Kandasamy	1,00,782	44.78	
DMK	Pongalur N. Palanisamy	90,669	40.29	
AMMK	K. Sugumar	16,530	7.35	
MNM	S. Mohanraj	6,644	2.95	
NTK	V. Vijaya Ragavan	4,335	1.93	
NOTA	None of the Above	1,938	0.86	
Majority		10,113	4.49	
Turnout		2,26,998	76.89	
AIADMK hold		Swing		

=== 2016 ===
2016 Tamil Nadu Legislative Assembly election: Sulur
Party	Candidate	Votes	%	±%
AIADMK	R. Kanagaraj	100,977	47.38%	
INC	Manoharan. V. M. C.	64,346	30.19%	
BJP	Mandharasalam. S. D.	13,517	6.34%	3.78%
DMDK	Thinakaran. K.	13,106	6.15%	−46.14%
KMDK	Premier Selvam @ Kalichamy. M.	9,672	4.54%	
NOTA	None Of The Above	3,688	1.73%	
NTK	Vijayaragavan. M. V.	2,873	1.35%	
PMK	Ganesan. P. K.	1,687	0.79%	
Margin of victory		36,631	17.19%	−0.23%
Turnout		2,13,121	75.60%	−4.55%
Registered electors		2,81,890		
AIADMK gain from DMDK		Swing	-4.91%	

=== 2011 ===
2011 Tamil Nadu Legislative Assembly election: Sulur
Party	Candidate	Votes	%	±%
DMDK	K. Thinakaran	88,680	52.29%	
KNMK	E. R. Eswaran	59,148	34.88%	
Independent	Dhinakaran K	7,285	4.30%	
BJP	Senthilkumar K	4,353	2.57%	
Independent	Karthikeyan Pon	3,053	1.80%	
Independent	Mariappan Dr M	2,205	1.30%	
Independent	Jerold Amalajothi I	1,315	0.78%	
Independent	Thangavelu C	1,281	0.76%	
BSP	Abdul Hakkim P	1,064	0.63%	
Margin of victory		29,532	17.41%	{{{change}}}
Turnout		2,11,574	80.16%	
Registered electors		1,69,588		
DMDK win (new seat)				

=== 1962 ===
1962 Madras Legislative Assembly election: Sulur
Party	Candidate	Votes	%	±%
INC	C. Kolandai Ammal	25,732	38.76%	−5.83%
CPI	K. N. Chinnayan	21,375	32.19%	
PSP	Kumarasami Gounder	10,017	15.09%	
DMK	U. K. N. Rasu	6,953	10.47%	
Independent	A. Sethupathy	1,364	2.05%	
Independent	V. R. Gopalasami Chettiar	955	1.44%	
Margin of victory		4,357	6.56%	−0.08%
Turnout		66,396	77.14%	25.43%
Registered electors		89,754		
INC hold		Swing	-5.83%	

=== 1957 ===
1957 Madras Legislative Assembly election: Sulur
Party	Candidate	Votes	%	±%
INC	C. Kolandai Ammal	18,328	44.59%	
CPI	K. Ramani	15,598	37.95%	
Independent	Shanmugasundaram	4,053	9.86%	
Independent	Natarajan	3,126	7.60%	
Margin of victory		2,730	6.64%	
Turnout		41,105	51.70%	
Registered electors		79,503		
INC win (new seat)				
