= Coimbatore West Assembly constituency =

Former constituency in Tamil Nadu, India

Coordinates: 11.024°N 76.906°E

Coimbatore (West)
- Former constituency for the Tamil Nadu Legislative Assembly

Constituency details
- Country: India
- Region: South India
- State: Tamil Nadu
- District: Coimbatore
- Established: 1967
- Abolished: 2008
- Total electors: 1,40,374
- Reservation: None

Coimbatore West was a legislative assembly constituency in the Indian state of Tamil Nadu. It covered parts of Coimbatore. Coimbatore East Assembly constituency was part of Coimbatore Lok Sabha constituency. After the 2008 delimitation, this constituency became defunct.

== Members of the Legislative Assembly ==
Year	Name	Party
1957	Savithiri Shanmugam	Indian National Congress
1962	G. E. Chinnadurai	Indian National Congress
1967	K. Govindarajulu	Dravida Munnetra Kazhagam
1971	P. Gopal	Dravida Munnetra Kazhagam
1973 Bye-election	C. Aranganayagam	All India Anna Dravida Munnetra Kazhagam
1977-1980	C. Aranganayagam	All India Anna Dravida Munnetra Kazhagam
1980-1984	C. Aranganayagam	All India Anna Dravida Munnetra Kazhagam
1984-1989	M. Ramanathan	Dravida Munnetra Kazhagam
1989-1991	M. Ramanathan	Dravida Munnetra Kazhagam
1991-1996	K. Selvaraj	Indian National Congress
1996-2001	C. T. Dhandapani	Dravida Munnetra Kazhagam
2001-2006	S. Maheswari	Indian National Congress
2006-2011	T. Malaravan	All India Anna Dravida Munnetra Kazhagam

== Election results ==
=== 1962 ===
1962 Madras Legislative Assembly election: Coimbatore West
Party	Candidate	Votes	%	±%
INC	G. E. Chinnadurai	38,645	42.10%	−1.94%
DMK	Rajamanickam	21,023	22.90%	
CPI	Bhupathy	21,012	22.89%	
SWA	Venkataramana Iyer	8,644	9.42%	
Independent	Natesan	2,278	2.48%	
Independent	P. S. Krishnaswamy	184	0.20%	
Margin of victory		17,622	19.20%	−3.50%
Turnout		91,786	78.11%	28.19%
Registered electors		119,949		
INC hold		Swing	-1.94%	
