= V. Gopalakrishnan =

V. Gopalakrishnan may refer to:

- V. Gopalakrishnan (Sankarankoil MLA), Indian politician
- V. Gopalakrishnan (actor) (1933–1998), Indian actor
- V. Gopalakrishnan (mayor), mayor of Coimbatore, Tamil Nadu
- V. R. Gopalakrishnan, Malayalam film director and story writer
- V. Gopalakrishnan (Mettupalayam MLA), member of the Mettupalayam state assembly
