= Pongalur N. Palanisamy =

Indian politician

Minister for Rural Industry, Minister for sports, Minister for animal husbandry, Minister for tourism Government of Tamil Nadu
- In office 1996–2001

Minister for Animal Husbandry, Government of Tamil Nadu
- In office 2006–2011

Member of Tamil Nadu legislative assembly for Coimbatore North constituency
- In office 2006–2011

Pongalur N. Palanisamy is a politician from the Indian state of Tamil Nadu. He is former minister for rural industries and animal husbandry in the Government of Tamil Nadu and a member of the Dravida Munnetra Kazhagam (DMK) party. He was born in Erode district on 3 August 1948.

== Political career ==
- Age 76
- 1971–1976, Member of Tamil Nadu Legislative Assembly for Pongalur
- 1991–2011, Coimbatore DMK District Secretary.
- 1996–2001, Minister for forests, pollution control, sports & animal husbandry.
- 2006–2011, Minister for Rural Industries & Animal Husbandry
- 2006–2011, Member of Tamil Nadu Legislative Assembly for Coimbatore East

== Elections contested ==
=== Tamilnadu Legislative Assembly Elections ===
Elections	Constituency	Party	Result	Vote percentage	Opposition Candidate	Opposition Party	Opposition vote percentage	Reference
1971 Tamil Nadu Legislative Assembly election	Pongalur	DMK	Won	59.98	A. Senapathi	Independent	30.24	
1977 Tamil Nadu Legislative Assembly election	Pongalur	DMK	Lost	20.74	K. Nachimuthu	AIADMK	32.56	
1996 Tamil Nadu Legislative Assembly election	Singanallur	DMK	Won	60.15	Duraisamy R	AIADMK	22.12	
2001 Tamil Nadu Legislative Assembly election	Singanallur	DMK	Lost	37.59	Karunakaran K C	CPI(M)	49.57	
2006 Tamil Nadu Legislative Assembly election	Coimbatore East	DMK	Won	47.50	Gopalakrishnan. V.	AIADMK	41.70	
2011 Tamil Nadu Legislative Assembly election	Coimbatore South	DMK	Lost	36.88	R. Doraisamy	AIADMK	56.27	
2019 Bypoll	Sulur	DMK	Lost	40.29	V. P. Kandasamy	AIADMK	44.78	

=== Lok Sabha Elections ===
Elections	Constituency	Party	Result	Vote percentage	Opposition Candidate	Opposition Party	Opposition vote percentage
2014 Indian general election	Pollachi	DMK	Lost	25.19	C. Mahendran	AIADMK	41.72

|}
