= K. Selvaraj =

Indian politician (1957/1958–2024)

Member of Tamil Nadu Legislative Assembly
- In office 1991–1996
- Preceded by: M. Ramanathan
- Succeeded by: C. T. Dhandapani
- Constituency: Coimbatore West

Personal details
- Born: 1957 or 1958 Madras State (now Tamil Nadu), India
- Died: 8 November 2024 (aged 66) Tirupati, Andhra Pradesh, India
- Occupation: Politician

Kovai K. Selvaraj (1957 or 1958 – 8 November 2024) was an Indian politician who was a member of the Tamil Nadu Legislative Assembly. He was DMK's deputy press secretary.

Selvaraj belonged to the Coimbatore R. S. Puram area. In the 1991 Tamil Nadu Assembly elections, he contested and won on behalf of the Indian National Congress from the Coimbatore West Assembly constituency. In 2006, he was the president of Sevadal. He was expelled from the Congress party in 2015 for criticizing the Congress-DMK alliance. After this, Selvaraj joined ADMK. Selvaraj, who was a supporter of Panneerselvam, left AIADMK and joined DMK in 2022. After that, he was DMK's Undersecretary for Communications.

Selvaraj died on 8 November 2024, at the age of 66.
