= S. M. Velusamy =

Indian politician

4th Mayor of Coimbatore
- In office 2011–2014
- Preceded by: R Venkatachalam
- Succeeded by: Ganapathi P. Raj Kumar

Personal details
- Party: All India Anna Dravida Munnetra Kazhagam

S. M. Velusamy (also known Se. Ma. Velusamy) is an Indian politician, Former Tamilnadu Minister of Commercial tax and housing (2001-2006) and Mayor of Coimbatore Municipal Corporation. As a cadre of All India Anna Dravida Munnetra Kazhagam party, he was elected to the Tamil Nadu Legislative Assembly from Palladam constituency in 2001 and 2006 elections.

== Electoral career ==
=== Tamil Nadu Legislative Assembly Election ===
Elections	Constituency	Party	Result	Vote percentage	Opposition candidate	Opposition party	Opposition vote percentage
2001 Tamil Nadu Legislative Assembly election	Palladam	AIADMK	Won	55.86	S. S. Ponmudi	DMK	33.89
2006 Tamil Nadu Legislative Assembly election	Palladam	AIADMK	Won	43.73	S. S. Ponmudi	DMK	40.42

=== Municipal Corporation Mayor Direct Elections ===
Elections	Corporation	Party	Result	Votes obtained	Opposition candidate	Opposition party	Opposition Votes obtained
2011 Tamil Nadu local elections	Coimbatore	AIADMK	Won	2,81,728	N. Karthik	DMK	1,53,816
