= N. M. Sukumar =

Indian politician

Member of the Tamil Nadu Legislative Assembly
- Incumbent
- Assumed office May 2026
- Preceded by: V. P. Kandasamy
- Constituency: Sulur

Personal details
- Party: Tamilaga Vettri Kazhagam
- Profession: Politician

Nachimuthu Sukumar is an Indian politician from Tamil Nadu. He is a member of the Tamil Nadu Legislative Assembly from Sulur representing Tamilaga Vettri Kazhagam.

== Early life and education ==
Sukumar is the son of Nachimuthu Thevar. He completed an Industrial Training Institute course from Sri Subbaiah Industrial Training Centre, Coimbatore, in 1988.

== Political career ==
Sukumar won the Sulur seat in the 2026 Tamil Nadu Legislative Assembly election as a candidate of Tamilaga Vettri Kazhagam. He received 90,531 votes and defeated V. P. Kandasamy of the All India Anna Dravida Munnetra Kazhagam by a margin of 4,790 votes.
