= Kudmul Ranga Rao =

Indian social activist and social reformer (1859–1928)

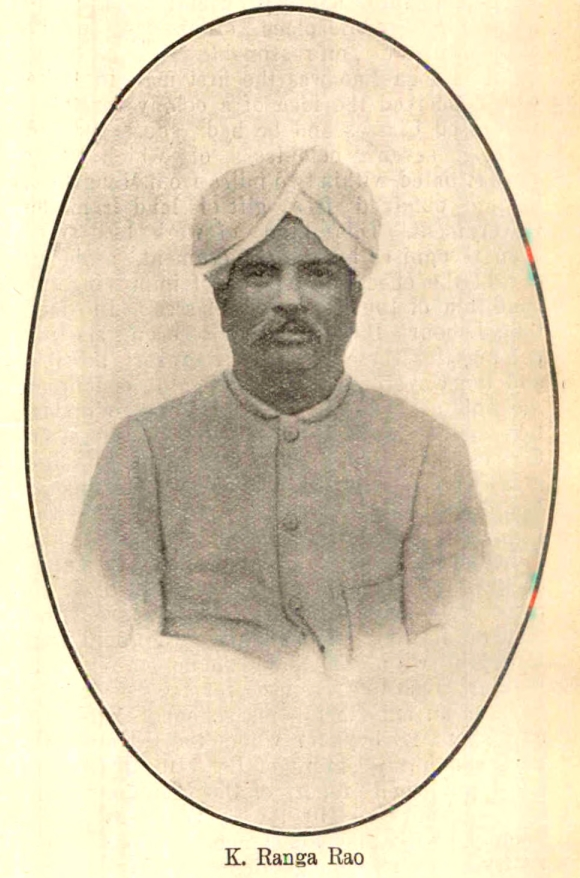
- Born: 29 June 1859; Kudmul, South Canara, Madras Presidency, British India
- Died: 30 January 1928 (aged 68); Shivabagh, Kadri, Mangalore, Madras Presidency, British India
- Organization: Depressed Classes Mission
- Movement: Empowerment of the socially backward classes
- Spouse: Rukmuniamma

Kudmul Ranga Rao (29 June 1859 – 30 January 1928) was a social reformer from Kudmul, a village in the Madras Presidency, (in the present-day Dakshina Kannada district) who established the Depressed Classes Mission in 1897 in Mangalore for providing education, better housing, drinking water and empowering the backward classes socially by guarding them against exploitation by other classes.

== Early life ==
Rangarao was born on 29 June 1859, in Kudmul, a village in south canara also known as Dakshina Kannada (Mangalore) in the east of Madras Presidency (now in Karnataka) of British India. He was born into a middle-class Gowda Saraswat Brahmin community. His father, Devappayya, worked as a clerk under a landlord and his mother, Gauri, a housewife. Rangarao completed his primary education in Kasaragod, before losing his father when he was 16. Moving to Mangalore in search of a job, he began working as a teacher for a monthly salary of ₹8. Completing his matriculation amid financial difficulties through a correspondence course, he cleared the pleadership examination, that certified him argue for a client in courts. Following this, he began his career as a lawyer in Mangalore.

== Career ==
Rangarao as an advocate in profession was better known as 'the poor man's lawyer'. 'Education is the source of progress' was his tenet. At a time when the depressed classes had no schools, when they were treated with scorn, Rangarao stepped forward as a crusader for the cause. Albeit facing grave opposition, Kudmul Rangarao continued to combat the orthodox beliefs of the then superstitious Indian society. Rangarao set up schools in Kankanadi, Bannanje, Moolkhi, Beloor, Udupi, Nejaru, Atthavara, Baabuguddde, Dhaddal forests for the downtrodden. He called them 'Panchama schools'. To persuade the kids to attend schools, he arranged for mid day meals and 2 paise per day to the parents to develop an interest and motivate the families to get their progeny to schools. It is said that he bathed the young kids, sat with them for lunch, slept in their huts to win over their hearts. He freed many servants and slaves from the clutches of demanding and barbarous masters. Despite being threatened myriad times, his grit and gusto could not be dampened.

By marrying off his own widowed daughter, Radhabai to P. Subbarayan, the zamindar of Kumaramangalam, he set an example of inter-caste marriage and Widow Re-Marriage in India. Following his inspiration, M K Gandhi's son entered wedlock with Chakravarthi Rajagopalachari's daughter. Mahatma Gandhi had once said, "I discerned social loyalty from Mr. Rangarao. He is an inspiration and a guide for me. He is my teacher when it comes to the upliftment of the untouchables". Dr. Subrayan's son was Mr. Mohan Kumaramangalam who died in an Air Crash. His son Rangarajan Kumaramangalam was a Minister in Congress and later BJP Govt.
