= K. P. Paramasivam =

Indian politician

K. P. Paramasivam is an Indian politician and incumbent member of the Tamil Nadu Legislative Assembly from the Palladam constituency. He represents the Anna Dravida Munnetra Kazhagam party.
