= Parvathi Krishnan =

Indian politician (1919–2014)

Member of Parliament, Lok Sabha
- In office 1974–1980
- Preceded by: K. Baladhandayutham
- Succeeded by: Era Mohan
- Constituency: Coimbatore
- In office 1957–1962
- Preceded by: N. M. Lingam
- Succeeded by: P. R. Ramakrishnan
- Constituency: Coimbatore

Member of Parliament, Rajya Sabha
- In office 3 April 1954 – 12 March 1957
- Constituency: Madras

Personal details
- Born: 15 March 1919 Ooty, Nilgiris District, Madras Presidency, British India (now Tamil Nadu, India)
- Died: 20 February 2014 (aged 94) Coimbatore, Tamil Nadu, India
- Party: Communist Party of India
- Spouse: N. K. Krishnan (m. 1942–1992)
- Children: 1 daughter
- Parents: P. Subbarayan (father); Radhabai Subbarayan (mother)
- Education: St. Hugh's College, Oxford, University of Oxford (B.A. (Hons.) Oxon)

Parvathi Krishnan (15 March 1919 – 20 February 2014) was an Indian politician from the Communist Party of India. She was a three time former Member of Parliament representing Coimbatore Lok Sabha constituency and Rajya Sabha member. She was the daughter of former Madras Presidency Premier P. Subbarayan.

== Early life ==
Parvathi was born on 15 March 1919 to P. Subbarayan and Radhabai Subbarayan. She did her schooling in C.S.I. Ewart Matriculation Higher Secondary School She studied for her B. A. (Hons.) at St Hugh's College, University of Oxford and joined the Communist Party of India.

== Electoral history ==
Parvathi contested for the Coimbatore Lok Sabha seat as a Communist Party of India candidate in the 1952 by-election (caused by the death of T. A. Ramalingam Chettiar). She was defeated by INC's N. M. Lingam. Later she was nominated to the Rajya Sabha on 3 April 1954 and served as a member of the Rajya Sabha till 12 March 1957. She was elected to the Lok Sabha from Coimbatore constituency as a Communist Party of India candidate in 1957 & 1977 general elections and the 1974 by-election. She lost the 1962 election to P. R. Ramakrishnan from Indian National Congress party, the 1980 election to Era Mohan from Dravida Munnetra Kazhagam party (contesting from Coimbatore) and the 1984 election to M. Thambi Durai of the Anna Dravida Munnetra Kazhagam party (contesting from Dharmapuri).

== Family ==
She married N. K. Krishnan in December 1942. The couple have a daughter, Indirani, and a granddaughter, Poornima.

== Notes ==
- "Members of the Rajya Sabha" (PDF). Rajya Sabha. Archived from the original (PDF) on 10 June 2014.
- "In high spirit at 83". The Hindu. 13 January 2003. Archived from the original on 8 May 2005.
