= K. Thinakaran =

Indian politician

K. Thinakaran is an Indian politician and former Member of the Tamil Nadu Legislative Assembly from the Sulur constituency. He represents the Desiya Murpokku Dravidar Kazhagam party.

On 28 September 2015, he and 50 DMDK supporters were arrested as they tried to stage a protest in front of the District Collectorate office to protest against the office allegedly not accepting a memorandum on the neglect of his constituency.
