= A. Kalpana =

6h Mayor of Coimbatore
- In office 4 March 2022 – 3 July 2024
- Preceded by: Ganapathi P.Raj Kumar
- Succeeded by: R. Ranganayaki

Personal details
- Born: Coimbatore, Tamil Nadu, India
- Party: Dravida Munnetra Kazhagam

Kalpana Anandakumar of DMK party is the sixth and incumbent mayor of Coimbatore city, Tamil Nadu. She succeeded Ganapathi P. Raj Kumar of All India Anna Dravida Munnetra Kazhagam as the first women mayor of the city after the local body elections held in the city in 2022.

On 3 July 2024 she resigned her office as mayor of Coimbatore.

== Mayoral election ==
In the mayoral elections of Coimbatore city in the year 2022, A. Kalpana on the side of DMK won in an indirect election with the support of 96 councillors.
