= V. P. Kandasamy =

Indian politician

Member of the Tamil Nadu Legislative Assembly
- In office 23 May 2019 – 4 May 2026
- Preceded by: R. Kanagaraj
- Constituency: Sulur

Personal details
- Party: All India Anna Dravida Munnetra Kazhagam

V. P. Kandasamy is an Indian politician. He is a member of the All India Anna Dravida Munnetra Kazhagam party. He was elected as a member of Tamil Nadu Legislative Assembly from Sulur Constituency in May 2021.

V. P. Kandasamy holds an M.A. degree from Sikkanna College of Arts and Sciences, University of Madras. He graduated in 1979.

== Elections contested ==
Election	Constituency	Party	Result	Vote %	Runner-up	Runner-up Party	Runner-up vote %
2019 Tamil Nadu Legislative Assembly by-elections	Sulur	AIADMK	Won		Pongalur N. Palanisamy	DMK	
2021 Tamil Nadu Legislative Assembly election	Sulur	ADMK	Won	49.23%	Premier Selvam @ M. Kalichamy	KMDK	36.02%

Tamil Nadu Legislative Assembly
Preceded by R. Kanagaraj	Member of the Legislative Assembly for Sulur; 2019–present	Incumbent
