= C. Kolandai Ammal =

Indian politician (born 1924)

Member of the Madras Legislative Assembly
- In office 1957–1967
- Constituency: Sulur

Personal details
- Born: 10 June 1924
- Party: Indian National Congress

C. Kolandai Ammal (born 10 June 1924) is an Indian educator, writer, broadcaster and politician of the Indian National Congress in Tamil Nadu. She served two terms in the Madras Legislative Assembly (1957–67).

== Early life ==
Ammal was born on 10 June 1924 and attended the Sarvajana High School. Later she graduated from Annamalai University, Annamalainagar.

== Career ==
Ammal joined the Indian National Congress (INC) party in 1951. She was a lecturer of Tamil language at the Nirmala College, Coimbatore and Santhalinga Swamigal Tamil College. She had written a book Aram Valartha Mangaiar beside being a regular broadcaster for the All India Radio.

The INC made Ammal its candidate for Sulur constituency during the 1957 Madras Legislative Assembly election. She defeated the Communist Party of India (CPI) candidate to enter the legislative assembly. She was re-elected in the following election (1962), again defeating a politician from CPI. In the 1967 election she stood from Modakkurichi but lost to Swatantra Party's K. R. Nallasivam. As a member of the assembly she advocated for population control, welfare of scheduled castes, farmers and women.

== Personal life ==
Kolandai Ammal was the mother of two children.
