= K. Baladhandayutham =

Indian politician

- கா. பாலதண்டாயுதம்

Member of Parliament (Lok Sabha)
- In office 15 March 1971 – 31 May 1973 †
- Preceded by: K. Ramani
- Succeeded by: Parvathi Krishnan
- Constituency: Coimbatore

Personal details
- Born: 2 April 1918
- Died: 31 May 1973 (aged 55) New Delhi, NCT of Delhi, India
- Citizenship: Indian
- Party: Communist Party of India

K. Baladhandayutham (2 April 1918 – 31 May 1973) was an Indian Tamil politician from the Communist Party of India.

== Politics ==
He was Member of 5th Lok Sabha representing Coimbatore Lok Sabha constituency.

On 31st May 1972, he raised a question in the Lok Sabha to the then Hon' Union Deputy Minster of Home Affairs F. H. Mohsin about the murder of Osmania University student George Reddy.

== Death ==
He was killed in the crash of Indian Airlines Flight 440 on 31 May 1973 at the age of 55.

== Legacy ==
The Communist Party of India Tamil Nadu State headquarters, Balan Illam, is named in his honor.
