= K. N. Kumarasamy Gounder =

Indian politician

Member of the Tamil Nadu Legislative Assembly
- In office 1967 - 1972; 1971 - 1976
- Preceded by: R. Sengaliappan
- Constituency: Palladam

Personal details
- Political party: Praja Socialist Party

K. N. Kumarasamy Gounder is an Indian politician and former Member of the Legislative Assembly of Tamil Nadu. He was elected to the Tamil Nadu legislative assembly as a Praja Socialist Party candidate from Palladam constituency in 1967, and 1971 elections.

== Electoral performance ==
1971 Tamil Nadu Legislative Assembly election: Palladam
Party	Candidate	Votes	%	±%
PSP	K. N. Kumarasamy Gounder	34,876	57.57%	New
INC	R. Sengaliappan	21,070	34.78%	−1.11
CPI(M)	Arangaramurthi	4,637	7.65%	New
Margin of victory		13,806	22.79%	11.68%
Turnout		60,583	67.06%	−8.98%
Registered electors		99,853		
PSP hold		Swing	10.58%	

1967 Madras Legislative Assembly election: Palladam
Party	Candidate	Votes	%	±%
PSP	K. N. Kumarasamy Gounder	31,977	46.99%	New
INC	R. Sengaliappan	24,421	35.89%	−15.78
Independent	M. V. Gounder	11,650	17.12%	New
Margin of victory		7,556	11.10%	−17.79%
Turnout		68,048	76.04%	2.83%
Registered electors		95,869		
PSP gain from INC		Swing	-4.67%	
