= P. Nagarajan =

Indian politician

Member of the India Parliament for Coimbatore
- In office 1 September 2014 – 23 May 2019
- Succeeded by: P. R. Natarajan
- Constituency: Coimbatore

Personal details
- Born: 12 June 1961 (age 65) Sarcarsamakulam, Coimbatore, Tamil Nadu
- Party: All India Anna Dravida Munnetra Kazhagam
- Spouse: Smt. Shanthi N.
- Children: 2
- Education: Government Arts College, Coimbatore, Madras Law College
- Occupation: Advocate
- As of 17 December, 2016

P Nagarajan (ta:பி. நாகராஜன்) (b 1963) is an Indian politician and Member of Parliament elected from Tamil Nadu. He is elected to the Lok Sabha from Coimbatore constituency as an Anna Dravida Munnetra Kazhagam candidate in 2014 election.

He is a lawyer and public prosecutor and hails from Koilpalayam village, Coimbatore.
