= T. A. Ramalingam Chettiar =

Tiruppur Angappa Ramalingam Chettiar

Member of Parliament (Lok Sabha) for Coimbatore
- In office 1951–1952
- Prime Minister: Pandit Jawaharlal Nehru
- Preceded by: None
- Succeeded by: Parvathi Krishnan

Personal details
- Born: 18 May 1881 Tiruppur
- Died: 1952 (aged 70–71)
- Party: Indian National Congress
- Education: Presidency College, Chennai
- Profession: Politician

Tiruppur Angappa Ramalingam Chettiar (18 May 1881 – 1952) was an Indian lawyer, politician, member of parliament and businessman from the Indian state of Tamil Nadu.

== Early life ==
Ramalingam was born to Tiruppur Angappa Chettiar and his wife Meenakshi Ammal at Tiruppur on 18 May 1881. Angappa Chettiar was a cotton merchant and banker. At a very early age, Ramalingam was sent to Coimbatore for schooling. He passed his matriculation with distinction and enrolled at Presidency College, Madras from where he graduated in law in 1904. Soon after his graduation, Ramalingam began to practice at the Madras High Court and served as the president of the Bar Council of Madras.

== Politics ==
Ramalingam developed a keen interest in politics during his term as the president of the bar council. He served first as the vice-president and then, the President of the district board of Coimbatore from 1913 onwards. He also served as the vice-chairman and Chairman of the Coimbatore municipality.

In 1921, he became a member of the Madras Legislative Council. He brough before the assemby a resolution of name "Exodus to the Hills" asking that the annual exodus of the Governor and Executive Councillors to the Ootacamund(Ooty) hills and assuming governance from there be discontinued from that year. However he later withdrew the resolution after C.G. Todhunter recounted the discussions from the previous council sessions of 1920 and assured that the Exodus be limited to 3 months in a year.

In 1946, Ramalingam was elected a member of the Constituent Assembly of India from Coimbatore. He participated in the debates on federalism and language policy. In 1951, he was elected unopposed to the Lok Sabha from Coimbatore.

== Co-operative movement ==
Ramalingam Chettiar was one of the pioneers of the co-operative movement in Madras Presidency and was associated with the movement since 1911. He started the Tamil Nadu Cooperative Federation and published a monthly called Kooturavu. He established the Ramalingam Co-operative Training Institute in Coimbatore. He was instrumental in the formation of the Central Co-operative Bank, Urban Bank, Land Development Bank, co-operative milk union and co-operative printing press in Coimbatore.

== Legacy ==
Ramalingam died in 1952. The co-operative institute he established is still functioning at Coimbatore. After his death, his heirs established the T.A. Ramalingam Chettiar Trust in his memory. The trust runs a Higher Secondary School named after him. The trust also sponsors a number of scholarships and endowments in various educational institutions in Coimbatore.

== See also ==
- T. S. Avinashilingam Chettiar
