= K. Ramkumar =

Indian politician

Member of the Tamil Nadu Legislative Assembly
- Incumbent
- Assumed office 2026
- Preceded by: M. S. M. Anandan
- Constituency: Palladam

Personal details
- Party: Tamilaga Vettri Kazhagam
- Profession: Politician

Kandhasami Ramkumar is an Indian politician from Tamil Nadu. He is a member of the Tamil Nadu Legislative Assembly from Palladam representing Tamilaga Vettri Kazhagam.

== Early life and education ==
Ramkumar is the son of Kandhasami. He is engaged in proprietorship business activities. He studied at K.S.C Government Higher Secondary School, Tiruppur.

== Political career ==
Ramkumar won the Palladam seat in the 2026 Tamil Nadu Legislative Assembly election as a candidate of Tamilaga Vettri Kazhagam. He received 1,21,297 votes and defeated K. P. Paramasivam of the All India Anna Dravida Munnetra Kazhagam by a margin of 37,897 votes.
