= Palladam Assembly constituency =

One of the 234 State Legislative Assembly Constituencies in Tamil Nadu, in India

Coordinates: 10.98°N 77.3°E

Palladam
- Constituency No. 115 for the Tamil Nadu Legislative Assembly

Constituency details
- Country: India
- Region: South India
- State: Tamil Nadu
- District: Tiruppur
- Lok Sabha constituency: Coimbatore
- Established: 1957
- Total electors: 329,875
- Reservation: None

Member of Legislative Assembly
- 17th Tamil Nadu Legislative Assembly
- Incumbent K. Ramkumar
- Party: TVK
- Alliance: TVK+
- Elected year: 2026

Palladam is a legislative assembly in Tiruppur district in India, which includes the town of Palladam. Palladam Assembly constituency is a part of Coimbatore Lok Sabha constituency. The constituency has been in existence since the 1957 election. It is one of the 234 State Legislative Assembly Constituencies in Tamil Nadu, in India.

== Demographics ==
Gender demographics of Palladam constituency as of 01.04.2021, taken ahead of the State General election in Tamilnadu in 2021.

Year	Female	Male	Transgender	Total
2021	1,93,139	1,93,904	68	3,87,111

== Members of Legislative Assembly ==
=== Madras State ===
Year	Winner	Party
1957	P. S. Chinnadurai	Praja Socialist Party
1962	Sengaliappan	Indian National Congress
1967	K. N. Kumarasamy Gounder	Praja Socialist Party

=== Tamil Nadu ===
Assembly	Duration	Winner	Party
Fifth	1971-77	K. N. Kumarasamy Gounder	Praja Socialist Party
Sixth	1977-80	P. G. Kittu	All India Anna Dravida Munnetra Kazhagam
Seventh	1980-84	P. N. Paramasiva Gounder	All India Anna Dravida Munnetra Kazhagam
Eighth	1984-89	P. N. Paramasiva Gounder	All India Anna Dravida Munnetra Kazhagam
Ninth	1989-91	M. Kannappan	Dravida Munnetra Kazhagam
Tenth	1991-96	K. S. Duraimurugan	All India Anna Dravida Munnetra Kazhagam
Eleventh	1996-01	S. S. Ponmudi	Dravida Munnetra Kazhagam
Twelfth	2001-06	S. M. Velusamy	All India Anna Dravida Munnetra Kazhagam
Thirteenth	2006-11	S. M. Velusamy	All India Anna Dravida Munnetra Kazhagam
Fourteenth	2011-2016	K. P. Paramasivam	All India Anna Dravida Munnetra Kazhagam
Fifteenth	2016	Karaipudur A. Natarajan	All India Anna Dravida Munnetra Kazhagam
Sixteenth	2021	M. S. M. Anandan	All India Anna Dravida Munnetra Kazhagam
Seventeenth	2026	K. Ramkumar	Tamilaga Vettri Kazhagam

== 2021 elections ==
=== Constituency details ===
Men	Women	Third Gender	Total
1,87,927	1,87,852	60	3,75,838

== Election results ==
Vote share of winning candidates
2026	40.30%
2021	48.86%
2016	47.01%
2011	66.78%
2006	43.73%
2001	55.86%
1996	55.64%
1991	61.03%
1989	39.12%
1984	53.97%
1980	48.36%
1977	33.11%
1971	57.57%
1967	46.99%
1962	51.66%
1957	57.83%

=== 2026 ===
2026 Tamil Nadu Legislative Assembly election: Palladam
Party	Candidate	Votes	%	±%
TVK	K. Ramkumar	121,297	40.30	New
AIADMK	K. P. Paramasivam	83,400	27.71	▼21.15
DMK	K. Selvaraj	78,625	26.12	New
NTK	K.V. Thamiliniyan	13,141	4.37	▼3.53
NOTA	NOTA	1,417	0.47	▼0.22
BSP	K. Rathinasamy	578	0.19	New
Independent	V. Mohanraj	407	0.14	New
Independent	A. Ramesh	364	0.12	New
Independent	A. Annadurai	346	0.11	New
Tamilaga Makkal Nala Katchi	S. Dharmaraj	327	0.11	New
Independent	Annadurai.R	285	0.09	New
Independent	S. Arumugam	274	0.09	New
Anna Puratchi Thalaivar Amma Dravida Munnetra Kazhagam	K. Sakthivel	184	0.06	New
Independent	G. Selvaraj	163	0.05	New
Independent	M. Selvaraj	123	0.04	New
Independent	A. Saravanan	83	0.03	New
Margin of victory		37,897	12.59	0.00
Turnout		3,01,014	91.25	▲24.62
Registered electors		3,29,875		▼59,911
TVK gain from AIADMK		Swing	▲40.30	

=== 2021 ===
2021 Tamil Nadu Legislative Assembly election: Palladam
Party	Candidate	Votes	%	±%
AIADMK	M. S. M. Anandan	126,903	48.86%	+1.85
MDMK	K. Muthu Rathinam	94,212	36.28%	+2.79
NTK	S. Subramanian	20,524	7.90%	+6.68
MNM	G. Mayilsamy	10,227	3.94%	New
AMMK	R. Jothimani	2,618	1.01%	New
NOTA	NOTA	1,802	0.69%	−0.95
Margin of victory		32,691	12.59%	−0.93%
Turnout		259,709	66.63%	−5.05%
Rejected ballots		98	0.04%	
Registered electors		389,786		
AIADMK hold		Swing	1.85%	

=== 2016 ===
2016 Tamil Nadu Legislative Assembly election: Palladam
Party	Candidate	Votes	%	±%
AIADMK	Karaipudur A. Natarajan	111,866	47.01%	−19.77
DMK	S. Krishna Moorthy	79,692	33.49%	New
MDMK	K. Muthu Rathinam	14,841	6.24%	New
BJP	S. Thangaraj	13,127	5.52%	+3.02
KMDK	C. Rajendran	6,572	2.76%	New
NOTA	NOTA	3,904	1.64%	New
NTK	T. Velusamy	2,911	1.22%	New
PMK	S. Kumar	2,292	0.96%	New
Independent	G. Nataraj	1,547	0.65%	New
Margin of victory		32,174	13.52%	−25.92%
Turnout		237,966	71.68%	−5.71%
Registered electors		331,995		
AIADMK hold		Swing	-19.77%	

=== 2011 ===
2011 Tamil Nadu Legislative Assembly election: Palladam
Party	Candidate	Votes	%	±%
AIADMK	K. P. Paramasivam	118,140	66.78%	+23.05
KNMK	K. Balasubramanian	48,364	27.34%	New
BJP	M. Shanmuga Sundaram	4,423	2.50%	+0.41
Independent	A. Annadurai	2,693	1.52%	New
Independent	R. Annadurai	1,819	1.03%	New
Independent	M. Senthilmurugan	1,471	0.83%	New
Margin of victory		69,776	39.44%	36.14%
Turnout		228,611	77.38%	6.65%
Registered electors		176,910		
AIADMK hold		Swing	23.05%	

=== 2006 ===
2006 Tamil Nadu Legislative Assembly election: Palladam
Party	Candidate	Votes	%	±%
AIADMK	S. M. Velusamy	73,059	43.73%	−12.13
DMK	S. S. Ponmudi	67,542	40.42%	+6.53
DMDK	G. Subramaniam	19,697	11.79%	New
BJP	P. M. Thirumurthy	3,492	2.09%	New
BSP	S. P. Mylswamy	1,226	0.73%	New
Independent	A. S. Rajendran	927	0.55%	New
Margin of victory		5,517	3.30%	−18.66%
Turnout		167,080	70.73%	10.49%
Registered electors		236,223		
AIADMK hold		Swing	-12.13%	

=== 2001 ===
2001 Tamil Nadu Legislative Assembly election: Palladam
Party	Candidate	Votes	%	±%
AIADMK	S. M. Velusamy	82,592	55.86%	+24.72
DMK	S. S. Ponmudi	50,118	33.89%	−21.74
MDMK	C. Ponnusamy	10,410	7.04%	−1.77
JD(S)	S. P. Muthulingam	1,514	1.02%	New
Independent	P. Velusamy	1,514	1.02%	New
Margin of victory		32,474	21.96%	−2.54%
Turnout		147,864	60.24%	−8.88%
Registered electors		245,455		
AIADMK gain from DMK		Swing	0.22%	

=== 1996 ===
1996 Tamil Nadu Legislative Assembly election: Palladam
Party	Candidate	Votes	%	±%
DMK	S. S. Ponmudi	73,901	55.64%	+23.22
AIADMK	K. S. Duraimurugan	41,361	31.14%	−29.89
MDMK	A. Ku. Palanisamy	11,707	8.81%	New
BJP	G. Rangasamy Naidu	2,796	2.11%	−2.09
Margin of victory		32,540	24.50%	−4.11%
Turnout		132,825	69.12%	4.03%
Registered electors		200,271		
DMK gain from AIADMK		Swing	-5.39%	

=== 1991 ===
1991 Tamil Nadu Legislative Assembly election: Palladam
Party	Candidate	Votes	%	±%
AIADMK	K. S. Duraimurugan	69,803	61.03%	+33.61
DMK	M. Kannappan	37,079	32.42%	−6.7
BJP	A. Bala Dhandapani	4,797	4.19%	New
PMK	C. Murugan	684	0.60%	New
Margin of victory		32,724	28.61%	16.91%
Turnout		114,376	65.09%	−9.02%
Registered electors		183,291		
AIADMK gain from DMK		Swing	21.91%	

=== 1989 ===
1989 Tamil Nadu Legislative Assembly election: Palladam
Party	Candidate	Votes	%	±%
DMK	M. Kannappan	45,395	39.12%	New
AIADMK	K. Sivaraj	31,819	27.42%	−26.55
INC	Sivaji Kandessamy	24,980	21.53%	New
AIADMK	K. C. Palanisamy	10,986	9.47%	−44.5
Independent	C. Subramanian	779	0.67%	New
Margin of victory		13,576	11.70%	0.53%
Turnout		116,038	74.11%	1.80%
Registered electors		159,768		
DMK gain from AIADMK		Swing	-14.85%	

=== 1984 ===
1984 Tamil Nadu Legislative Assembly election: Palladam
Party	Candidate	Votes	%	±%
AIADMK	P. N. Paramasiva Gounder	51,083	53.97%	+5.61
Independent	Sivasamy	40,510	42.80%	New
Independent	P. K. Kittu	950	1.00%	New
Independent	Thangavelu	815	0.86%	New
Margin of victory		10,573	11.17%	1.62%
Turnout		94,647	72.31%	6.44%
Registered electors		138,075		
AIADMK hold		Swing	5.61%	

=== 1980 ===
1980 Tamil Nadu Legislative Assembly election: Palladam
Party	Candidate	Votes	%	±%
AIADMK	P. N. Paramasiva Gounder	40,305	48.36%	+15.25
INC	K. N. Kumarasamy Gounder	32,345	38.81%	+14.23
JP	S. Ramaswamy	7,861	9.43%	New
Independent	A. P. Muthuswamy	2,826	3.39%	New
Margin of victory		7,960	9.55%	1.03%
Turnout		83,337	65.87%	−0.46%
Registered electors		128,604		
AIADMK hold		Swing	15.25%	

=== 1977 ===
1977 Tamil Nadu Legislative Assembly election: Palladam
Party	Candidate	Votes	%	±%
AIADMK	P. G. Kittu	27,172	33.11%	New
INC	K. N. Kumarasamy Gounder	20,175	24.58%	−10.2
JP	R. Krishnasamy Gounder	19,379	23.61%	New
DMK	R. C. Kandasamy	14,658	17.86%	New
Independent	C. Chinnia Gonuder	684	0.83%	New
Margin of victory		6,997	8.53%	−14.26%
Turnout		82,068	66.34%	−0.73%
Registered electors		125,740		
AIADMK gain from PSP		Swing	-24.46%	

=== 1971 ===
1971 Tamil Nadu Legislative Assembly election: Palladam
Party	Candidate	Votes	%	±%
PSP	K. N. Kumarasamy Gounder	34,876	57.57%	New
INC	R. Sengaliappan	21,070	34.78%	−1.11
CPI(M)	Arangaramurthi	4,637	7.65%	New
Margin of victory		13,806	22.79%	11.68%
Turnout		60,583	67.06%	−8.98%
Registered electors		99,853		
PSP hold		Swing	10.58%	

=== 1967 ===
1967 Madras Legislative Assembly election: Palladam
Party	Candidate	Votes	%	±%
PSP	K. N. Kumarasamy Gounder	31,977	46.99%	New
INC	R. Sengaliappan	24,421	35.89%	−15.78
Independent	M. V. Gounder	11,650	17.12%	New
Margin of victory		7,556	11.10%	−17.79%
Turnout		68,048	76.04%	2.83%
Registered electors		95,869		
PSP gain from INC		Swing	-4.67%	

=== 1962 ===
1962 Madras Legislative Assembly election: Palladam
Party	Candidate	Votes	%	±%
INC	R. Sengaliappan	33,437	51.66%	+14.3
PSP	P. S. Chinnadurai	14,736	22.77%	New
CPI	K. R. Ramasamy	10,247	15.83%	New
DMK	Palamisamy	4,778	7.38%	New
Socialist Party (India)	Gopalasamy	1,523	2.35%	New
Margin of victory		18,701	28.89%	8.43%
Turnout		64,721	73.22%	21.59%
Registered electors		92,464		
INC gain from PSP		Swing	-6.17%	

=== 1957 ===
1957 Madras Legislative Assembly election: Palladam
Party	Candidate	Votes	%	±%
PSP	P. S. Chinnadurai	27,111	57.83%	New
INC	Kumarasami Gounder	17,515	37.36%	New
Independent	Ponnusami	2,255	4.81%	New
Margin of victory		9,596	20.47%	
Turnout		46,881	51.63%	
Registered electors		90,803		
PSP win (new seat)				
