= Ganapathi P. Rajkumar =

Indian politician

Member of Parliament, Lok Sabha
- Incumbent
- Assumed office 4 June 2024
- Preceded by: P.R. Natarajan
- Constituency: Coimbatore

5th Mayor of Coimbatore
- In office 2014–2016
- Preceded by: S. M. Velusamy
- Succeeded by: A. Kalpana

Personal details
- Born: Ganapathi P. Rajkumar; 17 April 1965 (age 61)
- Party: Dravida Munnetra Kazhagam (2020 - present)
- Other political affiliations: All India Anna Dravida Munnetra Kazhagam (1989 - 2020)
- Education: B.A, M.A, Ph.D
- Occupation: Politician

Ganapathi P. Rajkumar is an Indian politician active in the state of Tamil Nadu. He served as the 5th mayor of Coimbatore from 2014 to 2016. He contested in the 2024 Indian general election from the Coimbatore Lok Sabha constituency as a candidate of the DMK.

== Early life and education ==
Rajkumar completed his Bachelor of arts (BA) degree in English Literature, Master of Arts (MA) degree in Mass Communication and Bachelor of Laws (LL.B). He subsequently completed his Doctorate degree (PhD) in Journalism and Mass communication.

== Politics ==
Rajkumar joined the AIADMK in 1989 and was elected as a councillor in the Coimbatore City Corporation in 2001. In the 2014 mayoral elections of Coimbatore, Rajkumar contested as the AIADMK candidate and won with a share of 420,104 votes after the BJP candidate came second with a share of 128,761 votes where neither the DMK nor the INC participated. Rajkumar was subsequently elected the mayor of Coimbatore, and served from 2014 to 2016. He previously held the position of Urban district secretary for the AIADMK.

Rajkumar joined the DMK on 21 December 2020 in the presence of M. K. Stalin as he felt he was sidelined by the leaders of the AIADMK. He is presently the DMK's Presidium Chairman of Coimbatore district.

For the 2024 Indian general election, he was selected by the DMK to contest from the Coimbatore Lok Sabha constituency.

== Electoral Career ==
=== Lok Sabha Election ===
Elections	Constituency	Party	Result	Votes obtained	Vote percentage	Opposition candidate	Opposition party	Opposition vote percentage
2024 Indian general election	Coimbatore	DMK	Won	5,68,200	41.4%	K. Annamalai	BJP	32.8%

He is the MP of Coimbatore

=== Municipal Corporation Mayor Direct Elections ===
Elections	Corporation	Party	Result	Votes obtained	Opposition candidate	Opposition party	Opposition Votes obtained
2011 Tamil Nadu local elections	Coimbatore	AIADMK	Won	4,20,104	Nandakumar	BJP	1,28,761

== Personal life ==
Rajkumar was born to Palanisamy and Bhuvaneswari on 17th April 1965.
