= P. R. Natarajan =

Indian politician

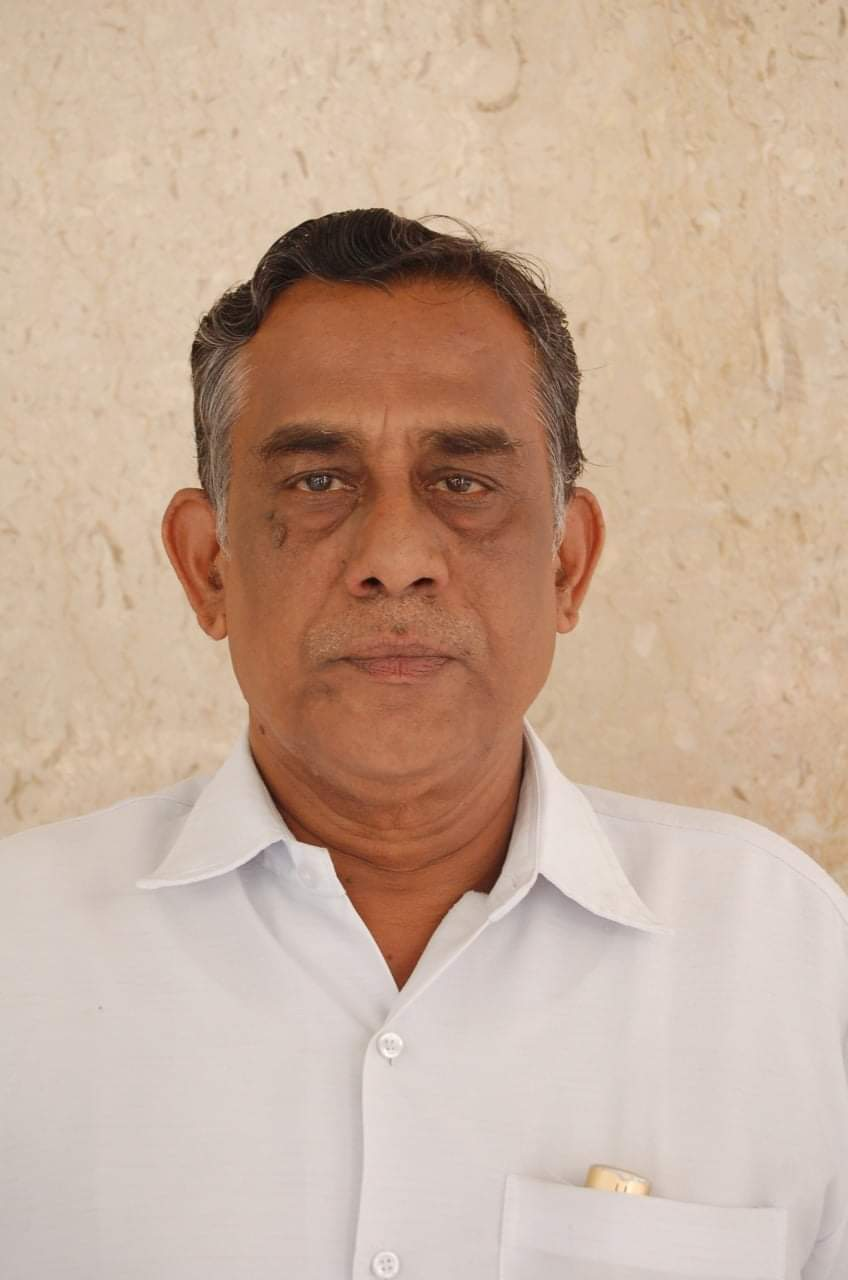

Leader of Communist Party of India (Marxist) Parliamentary Party, Lok Sabha
- In office May 2019 – June 2024
- Preceded by: P. Karunakaran
- Succeeded by: K. Radhakrishnan

Member of Parliament, Lok Sabha
- In office 23 May 2019 – 4 June 2024
- Preceded by: P. Nagarajan
- Succeeded by: Ganapathi P. Rajkumar
- Constituency: Coimbatore
- In office 16 May 2009 – 18 May 2014
- Preceded by: K. Subbarayan
- Succeeded by: P. Nagarajan
- Constituency: Coimbatore

Personal details
- Born: 21 December 1950 (age 75) Gobichettipalayam, Madras State, India
- Party: CPI(M)
- Spouse: R. Vanaja
- Education: B.A.
- As of 31 August, 2019

P. Ramaswamy Natarajan (born 21 December 1950) is an India politician who served as a member of the Lok Sabha from Coimbatore constituency of Tamil Nadu and the leader of the CPI(M) parliamentary party from 2019-2024. He served as MP from Coimbatore twice making him a senior leader of Tamil Nadu CPI(M) party.

== Personal life ==
P. R. Natarajan was born to P. V. Ramaswamy Iyer and Mangalambal at Gobichettipalayam on 21 December 1950. He has completed his B.A. from Pachaiyappa's College, Madras University. P. R. Natarajan is married to R. Vanaja. They got married on 5 April 1981.

== Political career ==
He was elected to Lok Sabha from Coimbatore Lok Sabha Constituency, Tamil Nadu in the 2019 Lok Sabha elections after defeating C. P. Radhakrishnan of BJP by over 1.79 Lakh votes. P. R. Natarajan has secured about 571,150 votes in this election. P. R. Natarajan from Coimbatore along with S. Venkatesan from Madurai were the two Communist Party of India (Marxist) MPs from Tamil Nadu in 17th Lok Sabha. P. R. Natarajan was also a member of the 15th Lok Sabha, when he defeated R. Prabhu of Indian National Congress in 2009, with a margin of over 35000 votes.

== Electoral Performances ==
He has contested a total of three times, and has won in 2009 and 2019.

Election	Constituency	Party	Result	Vote %	Opposition Candidate	Opposition Party	Opposition vote %
2009 Indian general election	Coimbatore	CPI(M)	Won	35.64	R. Prabhu	INC	30.94
2014 Indian general election	Coimbatore	CPI(M)	Lost	2.95	A.P. Nagarajan	AIADMK	37.24
2019 Indian general election	Coimbatore	CPI(M)	Won	45.85	C. P. Radhakrishnan	BJP	31.47

Lok Sabha
Preceded by K. Subbarayan	Member of Parliament for Coimbatore; 2009–2014	Succeeded by P. Nagarajan
Preceded by P. Nagarajan	Member of Parliament for Coimbatore; 2019–2024	Succeeded by Ganapathi P. Rajkumar
Party political offices
Preceded by P. Karunakaran	Leader of the Communist Party of India (Marxist) in the 17th Lok Sabha; 2019–2024	Succeeded by K. Radhakrishnan
