= List of mayors of Coimbatore =

Mayor of Coimbatore
- Incumbent; R. Ranganayaki since 6 August 2024
- Residence: Venkataswamy Road East, RS Puram
- Appointer: Electorate of Coimbatore
- Term length: 5 years
- Inaugural holder: V. Gopalakrishnan
- Formation: 1996
- Website: Mayor of Coimbatore

The Mayor of Coimbatore is the first citizen of the Indian city of Coimbatore. The elected mayor is the chief administrator of the city, and serves alongside 99 councillors of the Coimbatore Corporation.

The office of Mayor of Coimbatore, is currently held by R. Ranganayaki since 6 August 2024.

The Mayor is elected directly by the electorate. This was temporarily scrapped in 2006 in favour of an indirect election among the councillors. The process of direct elections was brought back in 2011 on the recommendation of the Election Commission of India.

The official residence of the Mayor is at Venkataswamy Road East in R. S. Puram.

== List of Mayors ==
The first mayor was elected in 1996. As of 2022, there have been six mayors, one from the Tamil Maanila Congress, three from the AIADMK, one from INC and one from the DMK.

#	Years	Mayor	Political Party	Notes
1	1996–2001	V Gopalakrishnan	Tamil Maanila Congress	First Mayor of Coimbatore
2	2001–2006	T. Malaravan	All India Anna Dravida Munnetra Kazhagam	
3	2006–2011	R. Venkatachalam	Indian National Congress	First Mayor to be elected indirectly
4	2011–2014	S. M. Velusamy	All India Anna Dravida Munnetra Kazhagam	
5	2014–2016	Ganapathi P.Raj Kumar	All India Anna Dravida Munnetra Kazhagam	
6	2022–2024	A. Kalpana	Dravida Munnetra Kazhagam	
7	2024–Present	R. Ranganayaki	Dravida Munnetra Kazhagam	
