= V. K. Lakshmanan =

Indian politician

V. K. Lakshmanan (c. 1932 – 25 August 2012) was an Indian politician and former Member of the Legislative Assembly of Tamil Nadu. He was elected to the Tamil Nadu legislative assembly as an Indian National Congress candidate from Coimbatore East constituency in the 1991 election and as a Tamil Maanila Congress in the 1996 and 2001 elections.
