= T. Malaravan =

Indian politician

Member of the Tamil Nadu Legislative Assembly
- In office 23 May 2011 – 21 May 2016
- Preceded by: Office established
- Succeeded by: P. R. G. Arunkumar
- Constituency: Coimbatore North
- In office 11 May 2006 – 13 May 2011
- Preceded by: S. Maheswari
- Succeeded by: Office abolised
- Constituency: Coimbatore West

2nd Mayor of Coimbatore
- In office 2001–2006
- Preceded by: V. Gopalakrishnan
- Succeeded by: R. Venkatachalam

Personal details
- Party: All India Anna Dravida Munnetra Kazhagam

T. Malaravan is an Indian politician and former member of the Tamil Nadu Legislative Assembly from the Coimbatore North constituency in 2011 elections. As a cadre of Anna Dravida Munnetra Kazhagam party, he represented the Coimbatore West constituency in 2006 elections.

He was the former Mayor of Coimbatore from 2001 to 2006.

Political offices
Preceded by V. Gopalakrishnan	Mayor of Coimbatore; 2001–2006	Succeeded by R. Venkatachalam
Tamil Nadu Legislative Assembly
Preceded by S. Maheswari	Member of the Legislative Assembly for Coimbatore West; 2006–2011	Succeeded by Office abolised
Preceded by Office established	Member of the Legislative Assembly for Coimbatore North; 2011–2016	Succeeded by P. R. G. Arunkumar
