= V. Gopalakrishnan (mayor) =

Indian politician

1st Mayor of Coimbatore
- In office 1996–2001
- Preceded by: office established
- Succeeded by: T. Malaravan

Personal details
- Party: Tamil Maanila Congress

V. Gopalakrishnan of Tamil Maanila Congress is the first mayor of Coimbatore city, Tamil Nadu.

== Mayor of Coimbatore ==
He was elected as the mayor of the Coimbatore city in 1996. He was the mayor of the city from 1996 to 2001.
