= R. Kanagaraj =

Indian politician (1955–2019)

R. Kanagaraj was an Indian politician and former Member of the Legislative Assembly of Tamil Nadu. He was elected to the Tamil Nadu legislative assembly as an All India Anna Dravida Munnetra Kazhagam candidate from Sulur constituency in the 2016. He died of cardiac arrest on 21 March 2019.
