= Palaniswami =

Palaniswami is an Indian surname. Notable people with the surname include:

- Edappadi K. Palaniswami (born 1954), Indian politician
- Marimuthu Palaniswami (fl. 2012), Australian computer scientist
