= Rural industry in India =

Economy of India
- Currency: Indian rupee (INR) ₹1
- Trade organisations: WTO, WCO, WFTU, G-20, BIS, AIIB, ADB

Statistics
- GDP: ▲$3.53 trillion (nominal; 2022) ▲$11.75 trillion (PPP; 2022)
- GDP rank: 5th (nominal; 2022); 3rd (PPP; 2018)
- Unemployment: ▼2.6% (2018)
- Main industries: Agricultural; Forest; handloom
- All values, unless otherwise stated, are in US dollars.

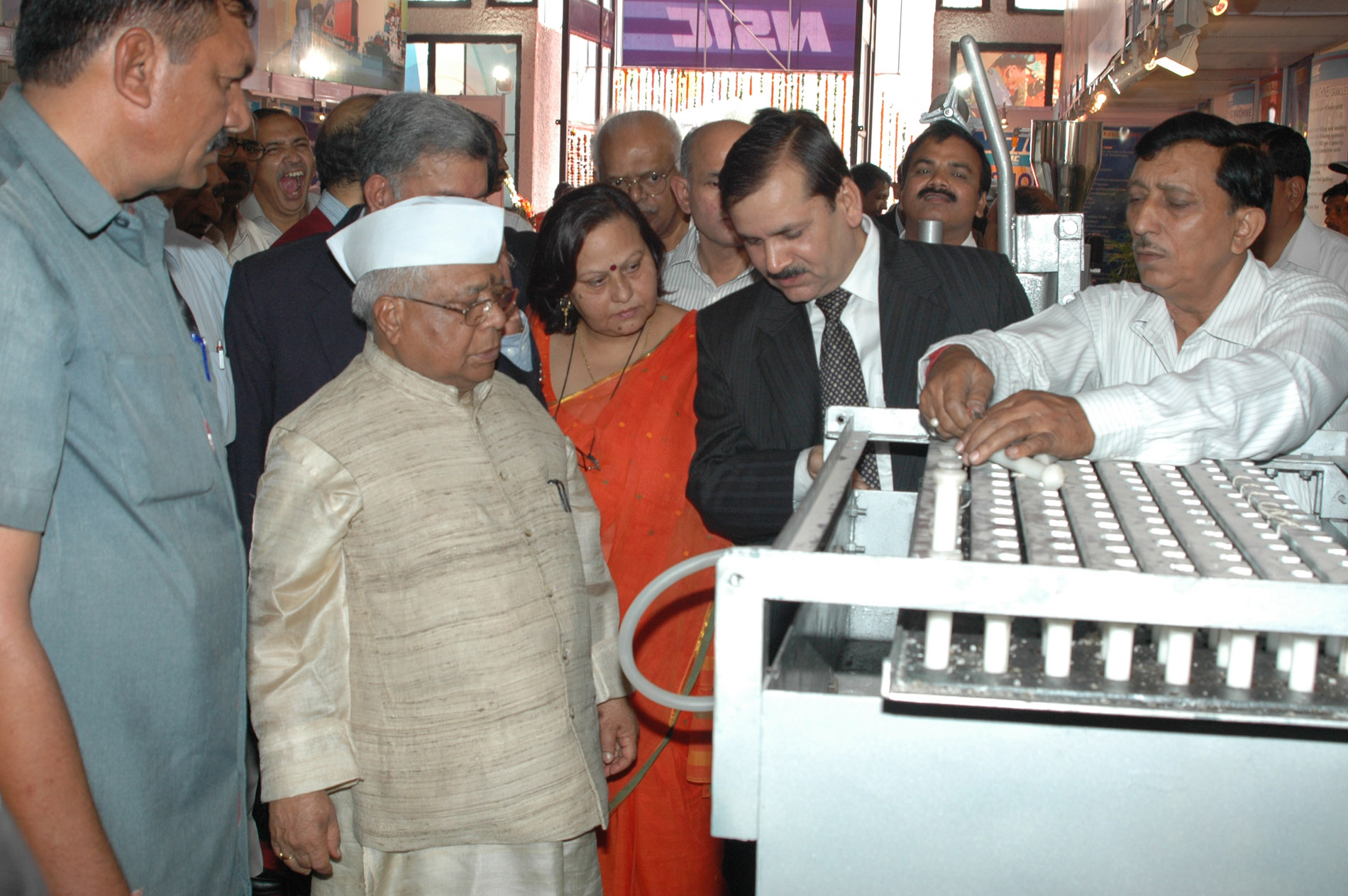
Rural industry in India

In rural areas, the business operates towards different industries, such as agriculture, forest, and handloom industries. The people living in different areas of rural India master in unique skills. Such as some rural people living in Kerala have professional skill in carving wood, the other rural people proficient in weaving carpet live in Kashmir, there are various skills from place to place because of the factors of resources and traditions. Besides, in India, the agricultural sector is vital for the economy because it accounts for 44.5% of GDP from 1970 to 1971 and offers 68% of rural employment. However, the agriculture sector shrunk to 16.1% of GDP in 2009 while the proportion of non-agricultural industry achieved 86% of the GDP.

A rural enterprise refers to a company registered in the rural areas, and is under the responsibility of the Department for Environment, Food and Rural Affairs. The reasons for business operating in the rural area are favorable factors such as the appealing dwelling, fresh air, bigger extend headroom, cheaper rental fees, and harmonious relationships with labor. In India, there are still many people living in rural areas. Furthermore, There are approximately 90% of employees are residents who work in an assigned area in the countryside and aim to increase the local economy. The purpose of increasing in rural economy is to make fewer people living under the poverty line. The joint family structure is predominant as the strong kinship relationship in India. Therefore, to assure that there are lucrative employment opportunities in rural India, the intervention of the plan is needed. For example, the Mahatma Gandhi National Rural Employment Guarantee Act has been promulgated to increase the opportunities for wage employment.

== History ==
In a different historical time, the performance of agriculture has a discrepancy, at the beginning of the green revolution, between the 1970s and 1980s, the growth rate of agricultural remains high in Uttar Pradesh. In the 1990s, the substantial loss is suffered by the farm economy as the growth space brings by the Green revolution may be used up. Such as the decline in the outputs of Cereal crops, wheat, and groundnuts. After the period of the liberalization, the growth of the food grains stayed behind the increase in the population between 2000 and 2001 and the Total factor productivity show a decreasing trend from 1993 The rural economy with slow growth pace has developed to a high-speed growth economy after the liberalization in economic and the improvement in the facilities. Between 1990 and 1991, the launch of new economic policies leads to a decline in the output of food grains and an increase in non-food crops such as cotton. The location of 61% of the total enterprises is in rural areas, as stated in the 2005 Economic Census Report.

== Types of rural industries ==
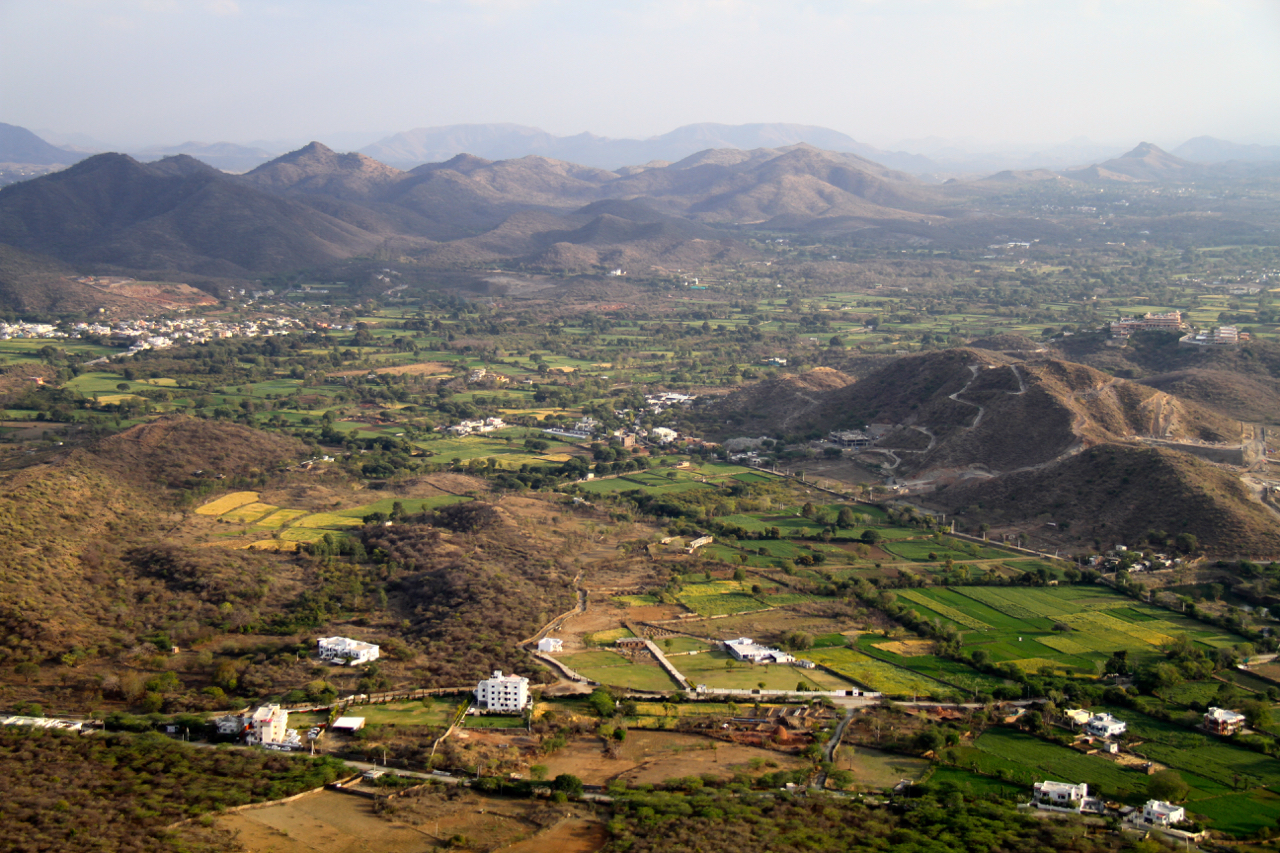
Agriculture farming in south India

=== Agriculture Industries ===
The agriculture industry is crucial as it solved the subsistence of the 2/3 of the population in the field study at Ambedkar Negar district, in which, the labor force of India accounts for 52%, and this sector made the contribution of 15.7% of the Gross domestic product between 2008 and 2009. The majority of the National economy is contributed by the agricultural industry. The job of people who lived in rural India is still mainly engaging in agricultural. Nevertheless, it also found that the agricultural has a receding proportion in the GDP. There are approximately 91% of the population in the 13 selected villages in India works associated with farming, among these, over 86% are the small and marginal farmers who have an achievement of cultivating 75% of the total arable land. Besides, The agrarian economy mainly comes from the little area and marginal and small land possessed by farmers. However, there are still some factors such as the advent of diseconomies caused by the liberalization agenda, the downward trend of the share of the land, the limited job opportunities and production possibilities may lead to the livelihood under the line of poverty. Finding the sources or crops that can generate incomes and trying to satisfy the need of the consumers is needed to sustain their daily life. The sources or crops that can generate incomes and trying to satisfy the need of the consumers is needed to sustain their daily life. For example, the commercial products (milk, vegetables, and fruits) are the sources that can be traded in markets and are required by the residents as secured food. Besides, the small and medium farmers are more likely to foster diversified resources with catering the demand such as the grains, fibers, and oilseeds, which makes more profits. Therefore, many farmers made a transformation from farm to non-farm agriculture businesses. For instance, there are roughly 66% of the peasant engaged in non-traditional agricultural enterprises.

=== Forest Industries ===
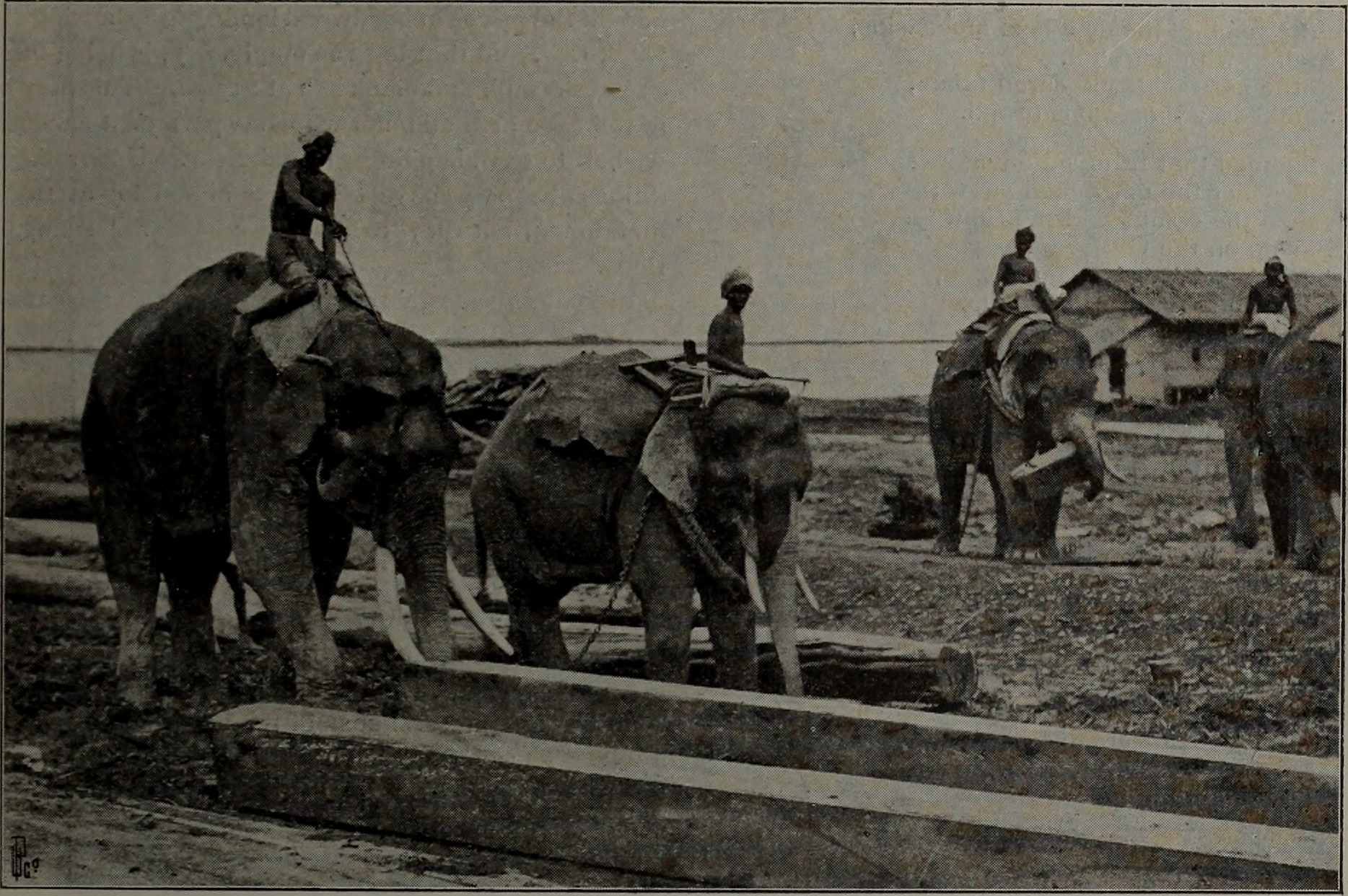
logging teak in India

The forest industry traditionally produces two primary resources, which are timber and non-timber forest products (NTEPs). The fuelwood plays a crucial role among the forest products as it taking up more than 35% average forest income in the selected 27 villages around the Jharkhand in India. Besides, the forest income is significant because it made 12% to 42% increases to the village economy, and it is the dominant source of income in HFLA and HFHA villages. From which, it would alleviate the livelihood burden of households. It is using the majority of the firewood in the rural family as a source for heating in the selected villages in Jharkhand. Thus, less than 10% of the fuelwood for trading. Apart from the firewood, there is another forest product also very valuable, which is NTFPs. The timber uses for producing furniture and equipment.

In contrast, the NTFPs encompass the products that can use in different areas, such as the medicinal plants for healing, some specific plants used in making cosmetics. Furthermore, NTEPs is one of the oldest product in trade. For instance, in the 12th century AD, there is trade in sandalwood oil and Arabic gum. Thus, it contributes to the local economies that started from the early days. Nowadays, the Baiga tribal in India still lives to rely on the NTFPs as the source for living and income. Moreover, it also stated that NTFPs has intangible values such as in many cultures, specific Forest area is sacred. Therefore, the function of the NTFPs also can be related to religion, not merely on the trade and the products.

=== Hand loom industries ===
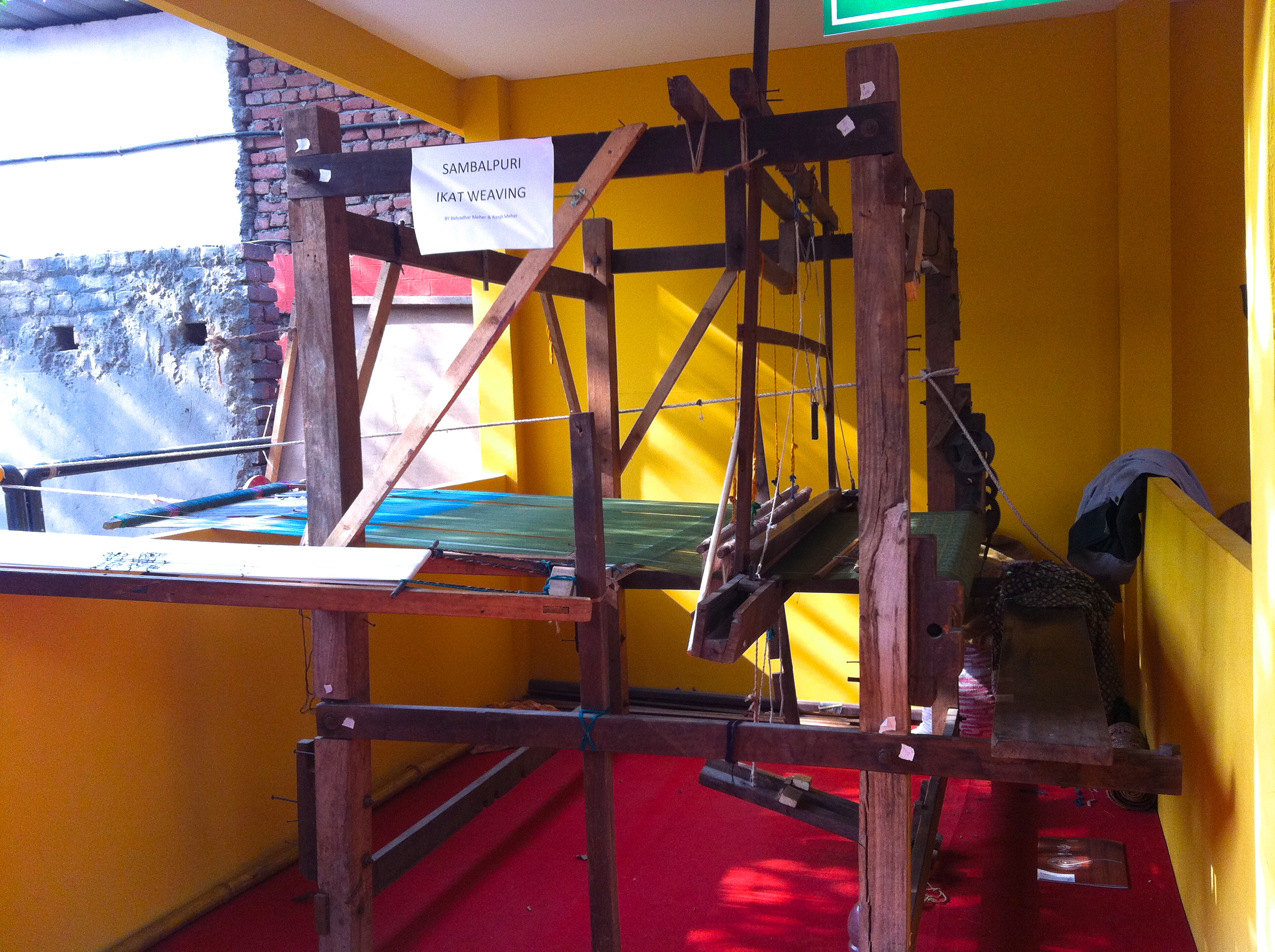
Sambalpuri Ikat weaving loom (Tanta) from Odisha

The hand loom industries in Odisha state, India is followed by the agriculture sector in terms of the contribution of the employment, which maintained the livelihood of the weavers in the low class. In rural India, the Bastralaya handloom cooperative produces traditional clothes (sarees, lungis) and household's products (bed cover) with dyeing Yarns. There is a tradition in India, when the advent of the Nuakhai festival, the handloom items will be sent between family members. Also, women will wear a sari to dance during this festival. Furthermore, there is a complicated braid art called Ikat, based in Telangana, which weaving prominent patterns on the silk with using environmentally friendly colored threads. Furthermore, while carrying on the orders, the quality of the product is strictly controlled, such as if the weaver did not meet the standard criteria in terms of the dimension of the sari, the cash fined will be required after rigorously check. Weavers in this industry should possess Textile skills, learn new knowledge through regular activities and observe the needs of the customer such as the color they preferred for the sarees, these competencies with the help of Bastralaya company will improve social-economic. Thus, the Bastralaya commit to bringing more earnings for weavers.

== Structure of rural enterprise ==
A Joint family enterprise in India has a dominant place due to the concept of family and the incentives of the economic benefits. The Joint family encompasses two types of family, which are patrilineal and matrilineal. Besides, the partnership between the family members or relatives with the same caste and sub-caste will bring significant start-up capital and assistance from relatives to solve the issue, such as handling all of the business simultaneously. Besides, another predominant reason for this form of partnership is the concept of unity in a kinship, which is a cherish perception relate to the immediate family or Distant Relatives as partners. For example, 23 partnership ventures have a corporation with family members in the total of the 48 enterprises in the selected two villages at Gujarat, West India. However, even if the strong sense of unity as a family but the conflicts may appear eventually, and sometimes the certain activities need different nature of the collaboration. Therefore, it could happen that the partnership established outside of the joint family.

== Rural enterprise in India ==
In India, there are different forms of rural enterprises, which are community-based organizations, self-help groups, and cooperatives, these companies are beneficial for the rural economy due to the job opportunities created. However, there are some challenges for enterprise in rural India, such as the limited assets, inadequate skills and labors, unsteady communication system, and weak transport infrastructure. These are obstacles for enterprises in rural areas to be enlarged to a higher-value market. Also, the deficit of knowledge on promoting the product may lead to the proposition of improper decisions. For example, India rural enterprise has a reliance on the traditional experiences to thrive on, such as the weavers in Sambalpuri Bastralaya Handloom cooperative society limited obtained basic knowledge from parents and community. Therefore, the appearance of e-commerce is to solve these issues. For instance, Anand Milk Union Limited is an India dairy cooperative; it applied the e-business in rural India to gain a robust supply chain, eliminate transport obstacles, and have a good relationship with customers.

=== Rural cooperatives in India ===
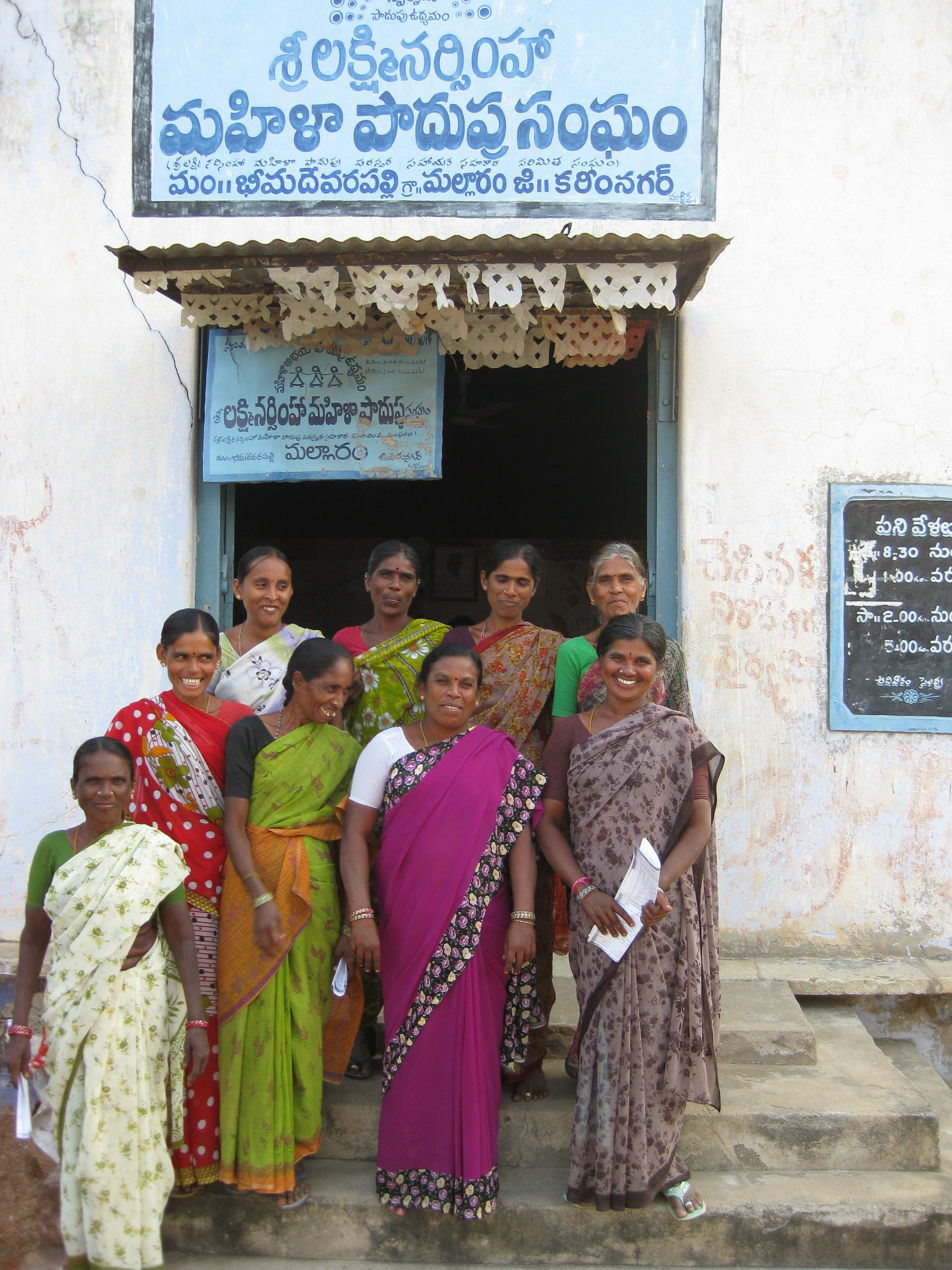
'thrift cooperative' in Mulukanoor, India

Cooperatives in India is on behalf of one of the most extensive system in terms of rural finance in the world. Agricultural cooperatives in India still have excellent scope for improvement with the changing economy. Through reaching a large number of clients, farmers (small and marginal farmers), and people under the poverty line, it can be seen that rural cooperatives have an essential role in the hinterland of rural areas. There are approximately 450,000 cooperatives in India with 220 million people involved. Cooperatives originated from the twentieth century, and at an early stage mainly catered to the financial needs of the farmer, especially the advent of harvesting and sowing. Today, the cooperatives are responsible for the majority of rural credit, which constitutes 65%. Under the different types of cooperatives in India, the credit cooperative is a powerful system in India, which encompasses the organization of the rural credit cooperative. In the villages of India the other types of cooperatives found are societies of farmer service and multipurpose society for large-scale agriculture. Rural Cooperatives also engaged in distributing quality inputs to farmers by charging maximum price through the activity of procurement. The dairy cooperatives in rural India help women become involved in the production of milk, acquiring confidence, more specifically, concerning the success of the Amul experiment. Pravaranagar Cooperative Sugar industry is another successful example as the contribution to the development of the social-economic rising in the economic benefit and the improvement of rural facilities, which are inclusive of the areas of education, recreation center, hospitals, and cooperatives.

=== Rural self-help groups ===
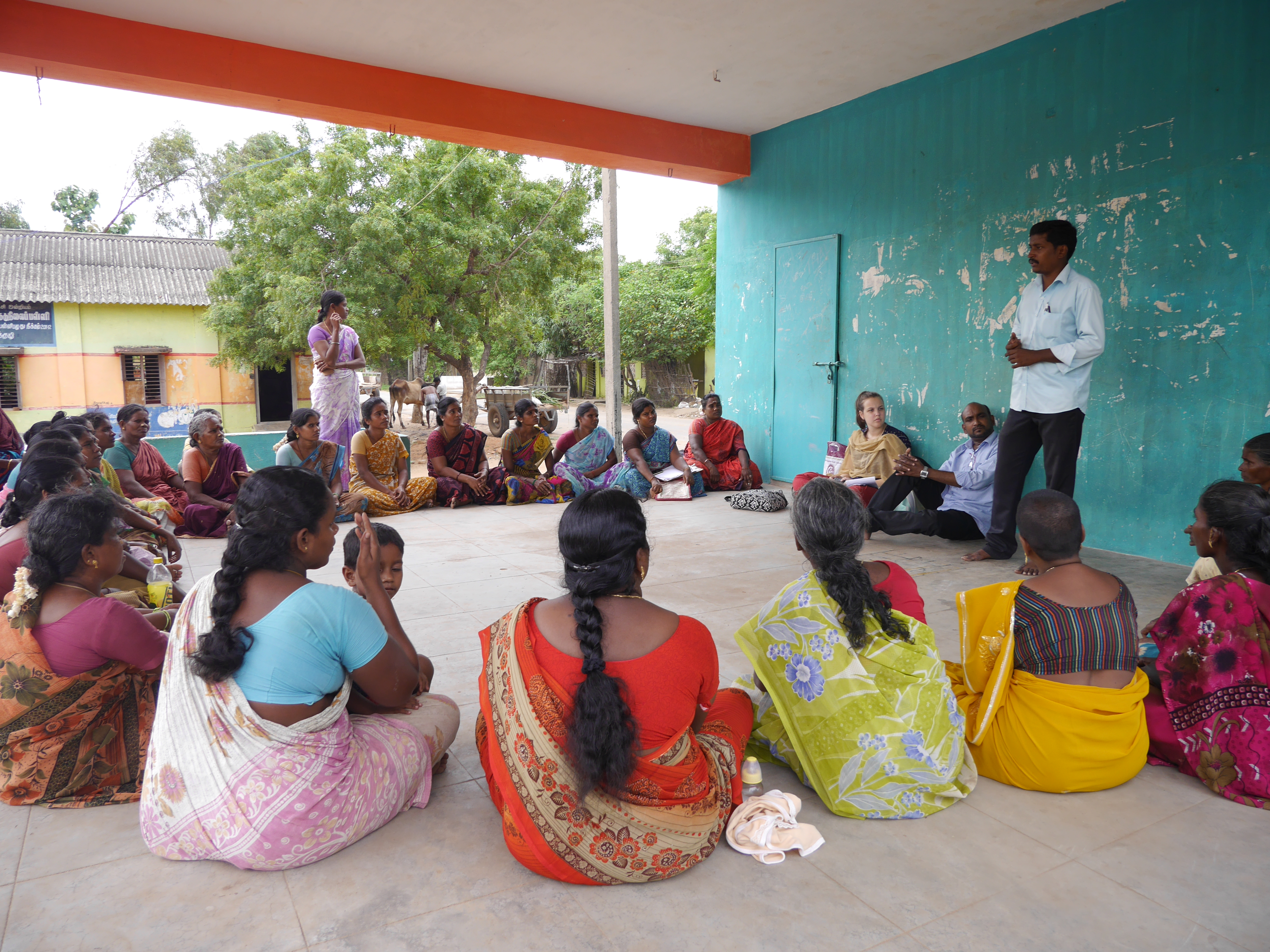
Self-help group in India

The self-help group in India is an action taken in a group in a wide range, which helps approximately 33 million of Indian women to obtain financial services and other activities with lower prices. Women in rural India, especially with lower castes and lower education level, facing a plight such as the adverse health condition and limitation to acquire financial products. There are commonly 10 to 20 members in a rural self-help group, who funded money mutually for the enterprise or emergency. For example, in Tamil Nadu, India. The new self-help groups established after the natural disaster. One of the famous models launched in rural India is to provide microcredit to poor Indian women. The initiatives of rural development in India concentrate on the development of the economic status of women and other vulnerable people by providing micro-credit. Besides, there is another model not only offer the Microfinance plus but also involved in the areas of education, social attendance, and politics. The self-help group has ethical implications for Indian women, such as alleviating the economic burden and eliminating gender inequality. After accessing the loan products, there is an improvement for rural women in the aspects of psychological and economic conditions. Moreover, women who are widowed will receive support. In South India, the large proportion of rural women, especially widows, experienced poverty, uncertainty in the inheritance of land, and barriers of involving in community. The existence of the rural self-help group is to empower the vulnerable group, especially women, to conquer the barriers.
