= S. S. Ponmudi =

Indian politician

S. S. Ponmudi was elected to the Tamil Nadu Legislative Assembly from the Palladam constituency in the 1996 elections. He was a candidate of the Dravida Munnetra Kazhagam (DMK) party.
