= Radhabai Subbarayan =

Indian politician

Kailash Radhabai Subbarayan, nee Kudmul (22 April 1891 - 1960) was an Indian politician, women's rights activist and social reformer. She was the wife of Indian politician P. Subbarayan and mother of Mohan Kumaramangalam, P. P. Kumaramangalam and Parvathi Krishnan.

== Early life and education ==
Radhabai Kudmul was born to Rao Sahib Kudmul Ranga Rao of Mangalore. She belonged to the Chitrapur Saraswat Brahmin community. She had her schooling in Mangalore and graduated from Presidency College, Madras. Widowed at an early age, in 1912, Radhabai married P. Subbarayan, zamindar of Kumaramangalam. The couple had three sons and one daughter. She did her post graduation from Somerville College, Oxford.

== Public life ==
Radhabai was an elected member of the senate of the Madras University. She also served as a member of the All India Women's Conference. In the Round Table Conference of 1930, she and Jahanara Shahnawaz were the only two active members of women's organisations nominated to the conference; they argued unsuccessfully for a 5 per cent reservation for women in the legislatures. She also participated in the Second Round Table Conference. The Lothian Committee was appointed, with Radhabai being a part of it, to gauge public opinion over reservations.

In 1937, Radhabai wanted to contest a general seat as a candidate of the Indian National Congress. But the Chairman of the Madras Provincial Reception Committee refused to support her. When Subbarayan questioned C. Rajagopalachari about this, he replied:

I don't believe that (the) advance type of woman candidates want political favours just because they are women.

However, Radhabai was elected unopposed to the Council of States from a general constituency in 1938 and became the first woman member of the Council of States.
