= Savithiri Shanmugam =

Indian politician (1913–?)

Savithiri Shanmugam (1913 - ?) was an Indian National Congress politician from Tamil Nadu. She represented Coimbatore I in the Madras Legislative Assembly (1957–62).

== Early life ==
Savithiri Shanmugam was born on 18 November 1913 and attended the St. Francis Convent, Coimbatore.

== Career ==
Shanmugam was a well known public figure and served in various capacities in different organisations. She was the Vice-chairperson of the Coimbatore Municipality and an honorary secretary of the Indian Red Cross society. She was also Vice-President of Guild of Service and Seva Nilayam beside being a member of the Annamalai University's senate.

The Indian National Congress party made her its official candidate during the 1957 Madras Legislative Assembly election. She contested from Coimbatore I and polled 20,511 votes. She defeated her nearest rival, a candidate of the Communist Party of India by a margin of 10,573 votes. While in the assembly, Shanmugam raised issues regarding women's education and farmers. She is credited for the increase in Madras government's fund to the Coimbatore Municipality. She called for making Tamil language the medium of instruction in all colleges. Not much is known about her later life.
