= K. Ramani =

Indian politician

Member of the Tamil Nadu Legislative Assembly
- In office 1977 – 1991
- Preceded by: K. Ranganathan
- Succeeded by: V. K. Lakshmanan
- Constituency: Coimbatore East

Member of Parliament, Lok Sabha
- In office 1967 – 1971
- Preceded by: P. R. Ramakrishnan
- Succeeded by: K. Baladhandayutham
- Constituency: Coimbatore

Personal details
- Born: 16 July 1916 Iddapal, Palakkad
- Died: 30 May 2006 (aged 89) Coimbatore
- Party: Communist Party of India (Marxist) (from 1964)
- Other political affiliations: Congress Socialist Party (till 1939); Communist Party of India (1939–1964)

K. Ramani (16 July 1916 – 30 May 2006) was an Indian politician. He was elected to the Lok Sabha in 1967, four times to the Tamil Nadu Legislative Assembly and was the Tamil Nadu State Committee president of the Centre of Indian Trade Unions.

Born in Kerala, his family moved to Coimbatore when Ramani was 14 years old. At young age, Ramani worked in a hotel. Ramani became politically radicalised, and joined the Congress Socialist Party. In 1939 he joined the Communist Party of India, along with many other CSP cadres. He became involved in trade union organising. He was arrested and jailed twice during this period.

When the Communist Party was banned in 1948, Ramani went underground. After two years of underground life, he was caught by police. He was sentenced to two years imprisonment. When the CPI was legalised in 1951, Ramani was released from jail.

In 1959 Ramani was elected to the National Council of the Communist Party. In the 1964 split in the party, Ramani was one of 32 National Council members that sided with the Communist Party of India (Marxist). Soon after the formation of the party, he was again arrested. He was released after 16 months in jail.

In 1967, he was elected to the Lok Sabha from the Coimbatore constituency. Ramani got 240,856 votes (57.93%) defeating the Congress candidate, industrialist N. Mahalingam.

In 1971 Indian general election he incurred defeat to K. Baladhandayutham of CPI in Coimbatore constituency.

During the Emergency 1975–1977, Ramani was again jailed.

Ramani represented the Coimbatore East seat in the Tamil Nadu assembly 1977–1991. On 1 February 1989, he was appointed pro-tem Speaker of the assembly.
