= M. Ramanathan =

Indian politician (died 2019)

M. Ramanathan (1934/35 – May 10, 2019) was an Indian politician and former Member of the Legislative Assembly of Tamil Nadu. He was elected to the Tamil Nadu legislative assembly as a Dravida Munnetra Kazhagam candidate from Coimbatore West constituency in 1984 and 1989 elections.

He died on 10 May 2019, at the age of 84.
