= Left Front (Tamil Nadu) =

- Left Front
- Abbreviation: LF
- Leader: Collective leadership
- Founded: 2026
- Ideology: Communism; Marxism-Leninism; Socialism; Secularism; Social justice
- Political position: Left-wing
- Colours: Red
- Seats in Lok Sabha: 4 / 39
- Seats in Tamil Nadu Legislative Assembly: 4 / 234

Left Front is an alliance of Left, progressive, secular and democratic parties in the Indian state of Tamil Nadu.

== Background ==
Communist parties, namely Communist Party of India (Marxist), Communist Party of India and Communist Party of India (Marxist-Leninist) Liberation had a line of strengthening the Left unity across India for a considerable period of time. Following that political line, the three parties along with Viduthalai Chiruthaigal Katchi previously held joint protests on different occasions in Tamil Nadu.

Following the defeat of the Dravida Munnetra Kazhagam-led Secular Progressive Alliance in 2026 Tamil Nadu Legislative Assembly election, CPI(M) and CPI left the SPA in accordance with the prevailing political situation and strived for joint struggles through the consolidation of Left forces and to present a credible Left alternative in the state’s political landscape. In this goal, the three Communist parties held two meetings at the Tamil Nadu state office of CPI(M). On 17 June, in a meeting at CPI’s Tamil Nadu state office, three parties decided to form ‘Left Coordination Committee’. The Left would intensify struggles on issues concerning Tamil Nadu's welfare and national interests while bringing together workers, democratic organisations and progressive intellectuals.

== Objectives ==
- To work together on issues concerning workers, farmers, youth and other sections of society.
- Advancing Left politics, defending secularism and federalism, and mobilising democratic forces against what they described as the divisive policies of the RSS-BJP.
- To intensify demands of the people, oppose communalism, and protect plurality of the nation.
- To coordinate campaigns, formulate action plans and organise protests at the State and district levels together.

== Member parties ==
| Flag | Party | Tamil Nadu State Secretary | National General Secretary |
|---|---|---|---|
| | Communist Party of India (Marxist) | P. Shanmugam | Marian Alexander Baby |
| | Communist Party of India | M. Veerapandian | D. Raja |
| | Communist Party of India (Marxist–Leninist) Liberation | P. Asaithambi | Dipankar Bhattacharya |

== Left Coordination Committee ==
The Left Front is coordinated by a 12-membered coordination committee.

| Party | Members | | | |
|---|---|---|---|---|
| CPI(M) | | | | |
| CPI(M) | Perumal Shanmugam | P. Sampath | N. Gunashekaran | K. Samuel Raj |
| CPI | | | | |
| CPI | M. Veerapandian | T.M. Murthi | N. Periyasamy | M. Ravi |
| CPI(ML)L | | | | |
| CPI(ML)L | Palani Asaithambi | Balasundaram | Chandra Mohan | S Janakiraman |

== List of Current Members in Tamil Nadu Legislative Assembly ==
| Constituency | Name |
|---|---|
| Kilvelur (SC) | T. Latha |
| Padmanabhapuram | R. Chellasamy |
| Thiruthuraipoondi | K. Marimuthu |
| Thalli | T. Ramachandran |

== List of Lok Sabha members ==
Current Tamil Nadu Lok Sabha (18th) members from LCC
| Name | Constituency |
|---|---|
| R. Sachithanantham | Dindigul |
| S. Venkatesan | Madurai |
| K. Subbarayan | Tiruppur |
| Selvaraj V. | Nagapattinam |

== See also ==
- Left Democratic Front
- Left Front (West Bengal)
