= Kottur =

Kottur may refer to:

== India ==
=== Tamil Nadu ===
- Kotturpuram, a neighborhood of Chennai City
- Kottur block, is a revenue block in Tiruvarur district
- Kottur, Theni, a village in Theni district
- Kottur, Tamil Nadu or Kottur-Malayandipattinam, a village in Coimbatore district
  - Kottur, Tamil Nadu Assembly constituency
- Kottur, Bargur, a village in Krishnagiri district
- Kottur, Palakkodu, a village in Dharmapuri district
- Kottur, Dindigul, Nilakottai, a village in Dindigul district
- Kottur, Sriperumbudur, a village in Kanchipuram district
- Kottur, Mathur, a village in Krishnagiri district
- Kottur, Krishnagiri, a village in Krishnagiri district
- Kottur, Nagappattinam, a village in Nagappattinam district
- Kottur, Mayiladuthurai, a village in Nagapattinam district
- Kottur, Thirumarugal, a village in Nagapattinam district
- Kottur, Nilgiris, Gudalur, a village in Nilgiris district
- Kottur, Pudukkottai, Tirumayam, a village in Pudukkottai district
- Kottur, Sivaganga, Devakottai, a village in Sivaganga district
- Kottur, Thanjavur, Thiruppanandal, a village in Thanjavur district
- Kottur, Tiruchirappalli, Musiri, a village in Tiruchirappalli district
- Kottur, Thiruvarur, a village in Thiruvarur district
- Kottur, Nannilam, a village in Thiruvarur district
- Kottur, Kodavasal, a village in Thiruvarur district
- Kottur, Jolarpet, a village in Tirupattur district
- Kottur, Pudur, a village in Thoothukudi district
- Kottur, Alwarthirunagari, a village in Thoothukudi district

=== Other Indian states ===
- Kottur, Chhattisgarh, Usoor, a village in Bijapur district, Chhattisgarh
- Kottur, Kodagu, Madiker, a village in Kodagu district, Karnataka
- Kotturu, Karnataka, also known as Kottur, a town in Bellary district in Karnataka
  - Kottur, Karnataka Assembly constituency
- Kottur, Kannur, Edakkad, a village in Kannur, Kerala
- Kottur, Kerala, a village in Kozhikode district, Kerala
- Kottur, Mahbubnagar, Aiza, a village in Mahbubnagar district, Telangana
- Kottur, Adilabad, Nennel, a village in Adilabad district, Telangana
- Kottur, Chittoor, Palasamudram, Chittoor, Andhra Pradesh

== See also ==
- Kottur Assembly constituency (disambiguation)
- Kotturu (disambiguation)
- Kottoor, Kerala, India
- Kothur G. Manjunath or Kottur G. Manjunath, an Indian politician
- Kottoor Soman or Kottur Soman, an Indian elephant
