= K. Gopal (ADMK politician) =

Indian politician

Dr. K. Gopal
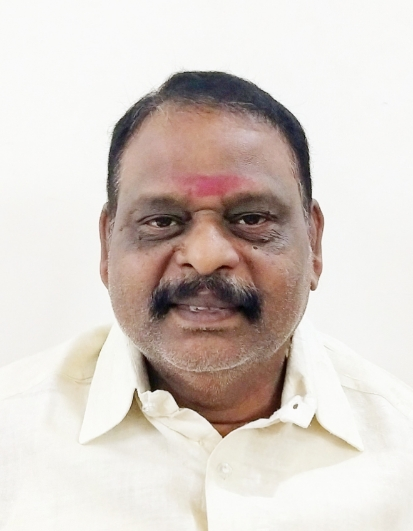

Member of Parliament, Lok Sabha
- In office 1 September 2014 – 23 May 2019
- Preceded by: A. K. S. Vijayan
- Succeeded by: M. Selvarasu
- Constituency: Nagapattinam

Member of Legislative Assembly
- In office June 1991 – May 1996
- Preceded by: M. Manimaran
- Succeeded by: Padma
- Constituency: Nannilam

Personal details
- Born: 10 November 1959 (age 66) Nagapattinam, Madras State, India
- Party: All India Anna Dravida Munnetra Kazhagam
- Spouse: Sangamithra
- Children: 3
- Education: Thanjavur Medical College
- Occupation: Medical practitioner, politician since 1991 (AIADMK)
- As of 17 December, 2016

K. Gopal (born 10 November 1959) is an Indian doctor and politician. He obtained a M.B.B.S degree from Thanjavur Medical College. Gopal was a Member of the Legislative Assembly from Nannilam 1991 to 1996. In 2014 he was elected to the Lok Sabha from the Nagapattinam (Lok Sabha constituency) as an Anna Dravida Munnetra Kazhagam candidate in the 2014 election. He won the seat with 46.06% and was elected Member of Parliament for Nagapattinam (Lok Sabha constituency) for 16th Lok Sabha.

== Education ==
Gopal did his schooling from a government school in Nagapattinam district. He obtained an M.B.B.S degree from Thanjavur Medical College.He completed his post graduate diploma in diabetology from Rajah Muthiah Medical College in Chidambaram.

== Family ==
He married Sangamithra, daughter of Indian National Congress veteran MLA V.Vedaiyan.

== Political career ==
Gopal was a Member of the Legislative Assembly from Nannilam 1991 to 1996. He was defeated in the 1996 Assembly elections in the same constituency.The AIAMDK fielded him as its candidate in the Nagapattinam Lok Sabha constituency in 1998, when he again suffered defeat to M. Selvarasu of CPI. He practised medicine and was involved in politics simultaneously for a few years. The Anna Dravida Munnetra Kazhagam announced him as a candidate for Thiruthuraipoondi (state assembly constituency) in the 2011 Tamil Nadu legislative assembly elections but soon withdrew the candidacy before the elections in favor for then alliance party Communist Party of India. In 2014 he was elected to the Lok Sabha from the Nagapattinam (Lok Sabha constituency) as an Anna Dravida Munnetra Kazhagam candidate in the 2014 election. He won the seat with 46.06% and was elected Member of Parliament for Nagapattinam (Lok Sabha constituency) for 16th Lok Sabha.

=== Lok Sabha Elections ===
Elections	Constituency	Party	Result	Vote percentage	Opposition Candidate	Opposition Party	Opposition vote percentage
1998 Indian general election	Nagapattinam	AIADMK	Lost	38.23	M. Selvarasu	INC	58.77
2014 Indian general election	Nagapattinam	AIADMK	Won	38.23	A. K. S. Vijayan	DMK	35.41

=== Tamilnadu State Legislative Assembly Elections ===
Elections	Constituency	Party	Result	Vote percentage	Opposition Candidate	Opposition Party	Opposition vote percentage
1991 Tamil Nadu Legislative Assembly election	Nannilam	AIADMK	Won	56.79	M. Manimaran	DMK	40.67
1996 Tamil Nadu Legislative Assembly election	Nannilam	AIADMK	Lost	28.31	Dr. Padma	TMC(M)	61.37

== Committee member ==
Standing Committee

- 1.Member of Science and technology committee of the Parliament.
- 2.Member of Environmental and forest and climate change of the Parliament.
- 3.Member of Welfare of SC/ST committee of the Parliament.
- 4.Member of Petition committee of the Parliament.
- 5.Member of food, consumer affairs and public distribution committee of the Parliament.

Consultative Committee

- 1.Member of Information and Technology committee of the Parliament.

== Notable work ==
Gopal has on multiple occasions brought up the crimes committed against SC/ST communities in the parliament and has discussed welfare of Backward Classes, Scheduled Castes, disabled persons with the Ministry of Social Justice and Empowerment.The government tabled the SC/ST amendment Bill in Lok Sabha, it was unanimously passed by the House. The Rajya Sabha passed the constitutional amendment Bill granting constitutional status to National Commission of Backward Classes. Gopal said "a comprehensive law on the lines of US and UK to declare caste panchayats unlawful." Gopal comes down heavily on cow vigilantism, so-called honour killing, especially Bhima Koregaon violence and Una flogging row. He said "It is unfortunate such incidents are happening when India will be celebrating her 72nd Independence Day," He has discussed with the Indian council of agricultural research regarding the welfare of women in agriculture in order to generate trained women in Agriculture field with the capability to carry out research in entrepreneur oriented areas.He had met and discussed with the then railway minister to re-route Chemmozhi express (Mannargudi-Coimbatore),(coimbatore-mannargudi), (mannargudi-manamadurai) to be operated from Tiruvarur.
