= Murugaiyan =

Murugaiyan may refer to:

- Anucharan Murugaiyan, Indian director
- G. Murugaiyan, Indian politician and former Member of the Legislative Assembly of Tamil Nadu
- K. Murugaiyan, Indian communist politician
- P. Murugaiyan, Indian politician and former Member of the Legislative Assembly of Tamil Nadu
- S. Murugaiyan, Indian politician and former Member of the Legislative Assembly of Tamil Nadu
- S.G. Murugaiyan, Indian communist politician in Tamil Nadu
- Thavil Kongampattu A V Murugaiyan (born 1964), Indian classical musician
