= S. G. Murugaiyan =

Indian politician

S.G. Murugaiyan
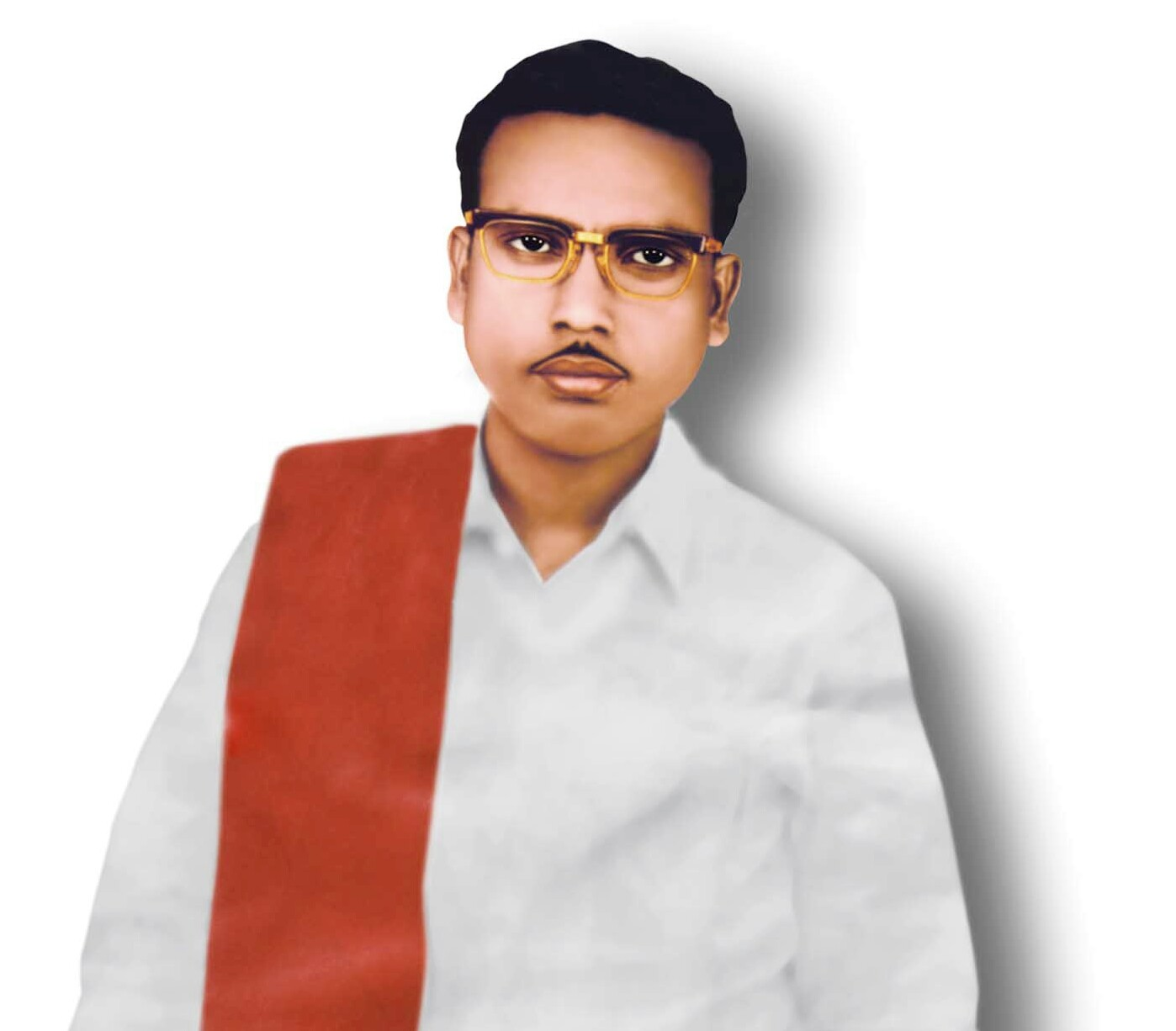

Member of the Indian Parliament (Lok Sabha)
- In office 1977 – 6 January 1979
- Preceded by: M. Kathamuthu
- Succeeded by: K. Murugaiyan (via bypoll)
- Constituency: Nagapattinam

Personal details
- Born: 15 July 1931 Sithamalli, Tanjore District, Madras Presidency, British India (now in Tiruvarur district, Tamil Nadu, India)
- Died: 5 January 1979 (aged 47) Sithamalli, Tanjore District (now in Tiruvarur district), Tamil Nadu, India
- Party: Communist Party of India
- Spouse: Nagammal
- Relations: M. Selvarasu (son-in-law)
- Children: 8

Sithamalli Govindan Murugaiyan (15 July 1931 – 5 January 1979), usually called S.G. Murugaiyan, was a communist politician in Tamil Nadu, India. S.G. Murugaiyan was a prominent leader of struggles of the oppressed sections of people in Mannargudi taluk, and became the first person from the Scheduled Castes in the state to be elected as revenue block chairman. In 1977 he was elected Member of Parliament. Two years later he was assassinated.

== Personal life ==
S.G. Murugaiyan was born on 15 July 1931 in Sithamalli, Mannargudi taluk. He hailed from a peasant family. He was the son of Govindan. Murugaiyan studied up to Matriculation. He married Nagammal in 1955, and had four sons and four daughters.

== Struggles in Mannargudi taluk ==
Murugaiyan emerged as a prominent leader of the Communist Party of India in his local area in the 1950s.

In 1962 Murugaiyan was elected chairman of the Kottur revenue block, being the first person from the Scheduled Castes in Tamil Nadu to be elected to such a post. He retained this post until 1970. He also served as the Nochoiour gram panchayat president 1956-1970. Murugaiyan spearheaded struggles of oppressed sections of people communities in Kottur, challenging social discrimination He led campaign which s were often met with violent resistance, and Murugaiyan was known for carrying knives and firearms. In 1970 he became the president of the Thanjavur District unit of the Kisan Sabha.

== Elections contested ==
Murugaiyan was elected to the Lok Sabha (lower house of the parliament of India) from the Nagapattinam constituency in the 1977 Indian general election. He obtained 278,419 votes (53.95%), defeating Thanzai M. Karunnanithi from the Dravida Munnetra Kazhagam.

=== Lok Sabha Elections ===
| Elections | Constituency | Party | Result | Vote percentage | Opposition Candidate | Opposition Party | Opposition vote percentage |
|---|---|---|---|---|---|---|---|
| 1977 Indian general election | Nagapattinam | CPI | Won | 53.95 | Thazhai Karunanithi | DMK | 46.05 |

== Assassination and aftermath ==
Murugaiyan was stabbed to death on 5 January 1979, in Sithamalli, near his home. The murder took place in broad daylight. CPI blamed "AIADMK goondas" for the murder.

Murugaiyan was one of three prominent communist leaders killed in Tamil Nadu in 1979. Tamil Nadu Chief Minister M.G. Ramachandran hastily travelled to the Sithamalli to pay his respects to the murdered leader. A mass protest was held in Mannargudi after the killing, CPI claimed around 100,000 people took part in the rally.

A by-election was held in Nagapattinam, which was won by his fellow CPI member K. Murugaiyan.

== Legacy ==
The CPI continues to organize memorial events for S.G. Murugaiyan in Tiruvarur District.
