= V. P. Nagaimaali =

Indian politician

Member of the Tamil Nadu Legislative Assembly
- In office 12 May 2021 – 10 May 2026
- Preceded by: U. Mathivanan
- Succeeded by: T. Latha
- Constituency: Kilvelur
- In office 23 May 2011 — 21 May 2016
- Preceded by: constituency established
- Succeeded by: U. Mathivanan

Personal details
- Party: Communist Party of India (Marxist)

V. P. Nagaimaali is an Indian politician and incumbent Member of the Tamil Nadu Legislative Assembly from the Kilvelur constituency. He represents the Communist Party of India (Marxist) party.

== Electoral performance ==
2021 Tamil Nadu Legislative Assembly election: Kilvelur
| Party | Candidate | Votes | % | ±% |
|---|---|---|---|---|
| CPI(M) | V. P. Nagaimaali | 67,988 | 47.85% | +35.88 |
| PMK | S. Vadivel Ravanan | 51,003 | 35.89% | +33.98 |
| NTK | S. Ponelavazhaki | 15,173 | 10.68% | +9.55 |
| MNM | G. Sidhu | 2,906 | 2.05% | New |
| AMMK | M. Neethimohan | 2,503 | 1.76% | New |
| NOTA | NOTA | 896 | 0.63% | −0.13 |
| Margin of victory | | 16,985 | 11.95% | 4.58% |
| Turnout | | 142,099 | 79.52% | −4.88% |
| Rejected ballots | | 378 | 0.27% | |
| Registered electors | | 178,686 | | |
| CPI(M) gain from DMK | | Swing | 2.90% | |

2016 Tamil Nadu Legislative Assembly election: Kilvelur
| Party | Candidate | Votes | % | ±% |
|---|---|---|---|---|
| DMK | U. Mathivanan | 61,999 | 44.95% | −3.44 |
| AIADMK | N. Meena | 51,829 | 37.58% | New |
| CPI(M) | V. P. Nagaimaali | 16,499 | 11.96% | −37.03 |
| PMK | A. Vanitha | 2,637 | 1.91% | New |
| NTK | G. Palanivel | 1,553 | 1.13% | New |
| BJP | S. Kumar | 1,142 | 0.83% | New |
| NOTA | NOTA | 1,049 | 0.76% | New |
| Margin of victory | | 10,170 | 7.37% | 6.78% |
| Turnout | | 137,929 | 84.40% | −1.48% |
| Registered electors | | 163,415 | | |
| DMK gain from CPI(M) | | Swing | -4.04% | |

2011 Tamil Nadu Legislative Assembly election: Kilvelur
| Party | Candidate | Votes | % | ±% |
|---|---|---|---|---|
| CPI(M) | V. P. Nagaimaali | 59,402 | 48.99% | New |
| DMK | U. Mathivanan | 58,678 | 48.39% | New |
| Independent | G. Devaki | 1,487 | 1.23% | New |
| BSP | J. Shajahan | 743 | 0.61% | New |
| Margin of victory | | 724 | 0.60% | |
| Turnout | | 121,254 | 85.88% | |
| Registered electors | | 141,185 | | |
| CPI(M) win (new seat) | | | | |
