= Tamil Nadu Communist Party =

Political party in Tamil Nadu, India

The Tamil Nadu Communist Party was a political party in Tamil Nadu, India. The party was founded by dissident Communist Party of India leader Manali C. Kandasami on 10 July 1973. The split had been provoked by opposition to the alliance between CPI and the Indian National Congress, in particular as the Congress Party was seen as trying to unseat the Dravida Munnetra Kazhagam government in Tamil Nadu. The party held two seats in the Tamil Nadu Legislative Assembly; represented by Manali C. Kandasami and A.K. Subbiah. The party was allied with the DMK.

The party became defunct when Manali C. Kandasami died.
