= Padma (politician) =

Indian medical doctor and politician

Dr. Padma

Member of Parliament, Lok Sabha
- In office 1991–1996
- Preceded by: M. Selvarasu
- Succeeded by: M. Selvarasu
- Constituency: Nagapattinam

Member of Legislative Assembly
- In office 1996–2001
- Preceded by: Dr.K.Gopal
- Succeeded by: C. K. Thamizharasan
- Constituency: Nannilam

Personal details
- Born: 5 January 1945 (age 81) Uppiliapuram, Trichinopoly District, Madras Presidency, India
- Party: Indian National Congress, Tamil Maanila Congress
- Spouse: C. Nammalvar (1966)
- Education: Thanjavur Medical College
- Occupation: Medical practitioner, politician

Dr. Padma (born 5 January 1945 in Uppiliapuram, Trichinopoly District) is an Indian medical doctor and politician. She is the daughter of M. Sengamalam, married C. Nammalvar in 1966. She obtained a M.B.B.S. degree from Thanjavur Medical College.

Dr. Padma was the second woman to be elected to the Lok Sabha from the central districts of Tamil Nadu since independence, when she won the Nagapattinam Lok Sabha constituency in the 1991 Indian general election for the INC, defeating the CPI candidate, M. Selvarasu, with 49.71% of the vote vs 45.8%. She also won the Nannilam Assembly constituency seat in the 1996 Tamil Nadu Legislative Assembly election as the Tamil Maanila Congress candidate, defeating AIADMK's Dr. K. Gopal, 61.37% to 28.31%.
