= Ulaganathan =

Ulaganathan is a surname. Notable people with the surname include:

- K. Ulaganathan, Indian politician
- Narayanswami Ulaganathan (born 1952), Indian footballer
