= A. Kalaiarasan =

Indian politician

Member-Tamil Nadu Legislative Assembly
- In office 1980–1984
- Preceded by: M. Manimaran
- Succeeded by: M. Manimaran
- Constituency: Nannilam

Personal details
- Born: 15 April 1949 P. Santhanapuram
- Party: All India Anna Dravida Munnetra Kazhagam
- Profession: Farmer

A. Kalaiarasan is an Indian politician and a former member of the Tamil Nadu Legislative Assembly. He hails from P. Santhanapuram village in Thiruvarur district. He studied at the Government School in Panthanallur. Belonging to the All India Anna Dravida Munnetra Kazhagam (AIADMK) party, he contested and won the Nannilam Assembly constituency in the 1980 Tamil Nadu Legislative Assembly election, becoming a Member of the Legislative Assembly (MLA).

== Electoral Performance ==
=== 1980 ===
1980 Tamil Nadu Legislative Assembly election: Nannilam
Party	Candidate	Votes	%	±%
AIADMK	A. Kalaiarasan	44,829	52.73%	+30.27
DMK	M. Manimaran	39,689	46.69%	+4.94
Independent	K. Balasundaram	495	0.58%	New
Margin of victory		5,140	6.05%	−5.26%
Turnout		85,013	74.47%	2.13%
Registered electors		115,349		
AIADMK gain from DMK		Swing	10.98%	
