= Koyil Puraa =

- Theatrical release poster
- Directed by: K. Vijayan
- Written by: Vinu Chakravarthy
- Produced by: Chandran; Kovai M. A. Majeed; Kallakudi Manickyam
- Starring: Saritha; K. Murugaiyan; Shankar
- Cinematography: P. L. Nagappa
- Edited by: B. Kandaswamy
- Music by: Ilaiyaraaja
- Production company: R. M. C. Creations
- Release date: 30 July 1981
- Country: India
- Language: Tamil

Koyil Puraa (transl. Temple pigeon) is a 1981 Indian Tamil-language film directed by K. Vijayan and written by Vinu Chakravarthy. The film stars Saritha, K. Murugaiyan and Shankar. It was released on 30 July 1981.

== Cast ==
- Saritha
- K. Murugaiyan
- Shankar
- P. U. C. Raja Bahadur
- Silk Smitha
- Samikannu
- Vinu Chakravarthy
- A. Veerappan
- Ennathe Kannaiah
- Usilai Mani

== Soundtrack ==
The soundtrack was composed by Ilaiyaraaja while the lyrics were written by Pulamaipithan. The song "Vedham Nee" is set in the Carnatic raga known as Gaula. Charulatha Mani identifies "Amuthe Tamizhe" as being set in Poorvikalyani, although Carnatic musicologist Sundararaman claims it is set in Rasika Ranjani, a raga he identifies "Sangeethame" as being set in, although Charulatha Mani says it is in Rasikapriya. This was the final film where the nadaswaram-playing brothers M. P. N. Sethuraman and Ponnuswamy performed.

Track listing
No.	Title	Singer(s)	Length
1.	"Vedham Nee"	K. J. Yesudas	4:25
2.	"Sangeethame"	S. Janaki	6:06
3.	"Amuthe Tamizhe"	P. Susheela, Uma Ramanan	4:48
Total length:			15:19

== Bibliography ==
- Sundararaman (2007) [2005]. Raga Chintamani: A Guide to Carnatic Ragas Through Tamil Film Music (2nd ed.). Pichhamal Chintamani. OCLC 295034757.
