= Sithamalli Sri Subramanya Shastrigal Yateendral =

Indian scholar, teacher and author (1866-1933)

Sri Subramanya Shastrigal

Personal life
- Born: April 1866 Sithamalli, Tamil Nadu, India
- Died: November 1933 (aged 67) Sithamalli, Tamil Nadu, India
- Resting place: Sri Kulasekara Swami temple

Religious life
- Religion: Hinduism

Religious career
- Teacher: Mannargudi Raju Sastri
- Students: Mahaperiyava

Sri Subramanya Shastrigal (April 1866, Sithamalli—November 1933, Sithamalli), also known as Sri Subramanya Yatheendraal, was a 19th-century Indian Sanskrit scholar, teacher and author. In 1933, he attained Jivanmukta while in Sithamalli and took on the name Subramanya Yatheendral.

== Biography ==
Sithamalli Subramanya Shastrigal was born in April 1866 in Sithamalli, Tamil Nadu. His father, Sri Kothandarama Iyer, owned considerable land in Tanjore district. Their ancestors reportedly came from Kerala sometime in the 16th century. Shastigral was the 7th guruparampara of Abhirami Pattar. Shastrigal lost his father at age 10. He started his vedic education under Brammashri Mannargudi Raju Sastri, a pre-eminent scholar of the Vedas.

In 1911, Shastrigal taught Vedas, Upanishads and Vyakaranam to Mahaperiyava in the village of Mahendramangalam. Mahaperiyava reportedly referred to him as an "encyclopedia of knowledge" and, knowing he was of great intellect, sent him to Kashi to attend the Vidwad Sadas. Shastrigal's other students included Srirangam Andavan Swamigal, Somadeva Sarma, Karungulam Sastrigal and Vembu Iyer. He was closely associated with Kanchi Kamakoti Mutt for most of his life and served in the administration for several years. He also served as a trustee on temple boards in cities including Kovilur, Perugavalandan and Pamani. He was instrumental in constructing the Perumal Temple in Sithamalli in 1920. The Maharaja of Cochin gave him the title "Panditaraja." He was also called "Eka Chanda Grahi Sannath" (the ability to commit to memory what one reads or hears only once) for his supposed photographic memory.

In 1932, Shastrigal fell ill while visiting his daughter, Janaki, in Thanjavur. Mahaperiyava, who was camping nearby, visited him daily and blessed his desire to take sannyasa. His son K S Viswam Iyer, nephew T.K.Srinivasan and his son-in-law Athmanatha Iyer took him to Sithamalli, where he had been instructed to chant mantraprayogams. His brother, Vembu Iyer, helped arrange for him a sannyasa yoga. A large crowd of friends, family, other scholars and townspeople gathered for darshan and joined in chants of Sri Rudram. Shastrigal finally announced that he would die on 9 November 1933 and asked those assembled to celebrate his attainment of Jivanmukta upon his passing. His body was buried on the western side of Sri Kulasekara Swami temple, where a public shrine was erected in his honour.

(This information was provided by Mr. Jyotisha Ratna Raman, great grandson of Sri Subramanya Yateendral, in His poorvashrama [Retired commissioner, HRCE, Pondicherry State]).

== Bibliography ==
- Sri Chandrasekara Ashtakam
- Sri Kulasekaraswami Stotram
- Sri Sankarar Sthuthi
- Kaladi Shankara Vijayam
