= Kottur Assembly constituency =

Kottur Assembly constituency may refer to:

- Kottur, Karnataka Assembly constituency, former constituency in Karnataka, India
- Kottur, Tamil Nadu Assembly constituency, former constituency in Tamil Nadu, India

== See also ==
- Kottur (disambiguation)
