= Tiruvarur Assembly constituency =

One of the 234 State Legislative Assembly Constituencies in Tamil Nadu, in India

Coordinates: 10°46′02.92″N 79°36′53.37″E

Tiruvarur
- Constituency No. 168 for the Tamil Nadu Legislative Assembly

Constituency details
- Country: India
- Region: South India
- State: Tamil Nadu
- District: Tiruvarur
- Lok Sabha constituency: Nagapattinam
- Established: 1962
- Total electors: 260,145
- Reservation: None

Member of Legislative Assembly
- 17th Tamil Nadu Legislative Assembly
- Incumbent Kalaivanan Poondi K
- Party: DMK
- Alliance: SPA
- Elected year: 2026

Tiruvarur is a state assembly constituency in Tiruvarur district in Tamil Nadu. It was reserved for the Scheduled Castes before being changed to have no reservation from the 2011 general elections. It consists of Thiruvarur, Koradacherry and part of Kodavasal panchayat union. It is one of the 234 State Legislative Assembly Constituencies in Tamil Nadu, in India. Former chief minister M. Karunanidhi representated this two times.

== Members of Legislative Assembly ==
Year	Member	Political party
Madras State
1962	C. M. Ambikapathy	Indian National Congress
1967	P. S. Dhanushkodi	Communist Party of India (Marxist)
Tamil Nadu
1971	Karunanidhi Thazhai	Dravida Munnetra Kazhagam
1977	Karunanidhi Thazhai	Dravida Munnetra Kazhagam
1980	M. Sellamuthu	Communist Party of India (Marxist)
1984	M. Sellamuthu	Communist Party of India (Marxist)
1989	V. Thambusamy	Communist Party of India (Marxist)
1991	V. Thambusamy	Communist Party of India (Marxist)
1996	A. Asokan	Dravida Munnetra Kazhagam
2001	A. Asokan	Dravida Munnetra Kazhagam
2006	U. Mathivanan	Dravida Munnetra Kazhagam
2011	M. Karunanidhi	Dravida Munnetra Kazhagam
2016	M. Karunanidhi	Dravida Munnetra Kazhagam
2019^	K. Poondi Kalaivanan	Dravida Munnetra Kazhagam
2021	K. Poondi Kalaivanan	Dravida Munnetra Kazhagam
2026	K. Poondi Kalaivanan	Dravida Munnetra Kazhagam

== Election results ==
Vote share of winning candidates
2026	42.87%
2021	52.29%
2019 by-election	57.00%
2016	61.73%
2011	62.96%
2006	56.77%
2001	47.63%
1996	60.03%
1991	51.22%
1989	47.75%
1984	55.99%
1980	50.18%
1977	44.27%
1971	47.46%
1967	48.04%
1962	44.89%

=== 2026 ===
2026 Tamil Nadu Legislative Assembly election: Tiruvarur
Party	Candidate	Votes	%	±%
DMK	Kalaivanan Poondi K	93,408	42.87	▼9.42
TVK	V. Veeramani	75,260	34.54	New
BJP	Chandrasekaran Govi	36,387	16.70	New
NTK	Aswini B	10,031	4.60	▼8.03
NOTA	NOTA	825	0.38	
Independent	Sahul Hameed M	593	0.27	New
PT	Thiyagarajan.M	526	0.24	New
TVK	Kanthan A	503	0.23	New
Independent	Mutharasan S	342	0.16	New
Margin of victory		18,148	8.33	▼16.24
Turnout		2,17,875	83.75	▲10.07
Registered electors		2,60,145		▼22,563
DMK hold		Swing	▼9.42	

=== 2021 ===
2021 Tamil Nadu Legislative Assembly election: Tiruvarur
Party	Candidate	Votes	%	±%
DMK	K. Poondi Kalaivanan	108,906	52.29	−9.44
AIADMK	A. N. R. Pannerselvam	57,732	27.72	+0.73
NTK	R. Vinothini	26,300	12.63	+11.9
SDPI	M. A. Naseema Banu [koothanallur]	6,364	3.06	New
MNM	P. Kabilarasan	4,068	1.95	New
Tamil Nadu Ilangyar Katchi	Thiyagasutharam	1,008	0.48	−0.31
Margin of victory		51,174	24.57	−10.17
Turnout		208,290	73.68	−4.04
Rejected ballots		191	0.09	
Registered electors		282,708		
DMK hold		Swing	-9.44	

=== 2019 by-election ===
2019 Tamil Nadu Legislative Assembly by-elections: Thiruvarur
Party	Candidate	Votes	%	±%
DMK	K. Poondi Kalaivanan	117,616	57.00	
AIADMK	R. Jeevanantham	53,045	25.71	
AMMK	S. Kamaraj	19,133	9.27	
NTK	R. Vinothini	8,144	3.95	
MNM	K. Arun Chidambaram	4,251	2.06	
NOTA	None of the Above	1,413	0.68	
Majority		64,571	31.29	
Rejected ballots		226		
Turnout		2,04,935		
Registered electors		2,96,159		
DMK hold		Swing		

=== 2016 ===
2016 Tamil Nadu Legislative Assembly election: Tiruvarur
Party	Candidate	Votes	%	±%
DMK	M. Karunanidhi	121,473	61.73	−1.23
AIADMK	R. Pannerselvam	53,107	26.99	−6.95
CPI	P. S. Masilamani	13,158	6.69	New
NOTA	NOTA	2,177	1.11	New
PMK	R. Sivakumar	1,787	0.91	New
NTK	Thendral Chandrasekar	1,427	0.73	New
BJP	N. Rengadass	1,254	0.64	−0.09
Margin of victory		68,366	34.74	5.72
Turnout		196,795	77.71	−4.93
Registered electors		253,227		
DMK hold		Swing	-1.23	

=== 2011 ===
2011 Tamil Nadu Legislative Assembly election: Tiruvarur
Party	Candidate	Votes	%	±%
DMK	M. Karunanidhi	109,014	62.96	+6.19
AIADMK	M. Rajendran	58,765	33.94	−2.95
Independent	P. N. Sriramachandran	1,741	1.01	New
BJP	R. Pingalan	1,263	0.73	+0.1
Margin of victory		50,249	29.02	9.14
Turnout		173,159	82.64	5.91
Registered electors		209,530		
DMK hold		Swing	6.19	

=== 2006 ===
2006 Tamil Nadu Legislative Assembly election: Tiruvarur
Party	Candidate	Votes	%	±%
DMK	U. Mathivanan	76,901	56.77	+9.13
AIADMK	A. Thangamani	49,968	36.89	New
DMDK	N. Mohankumar	5,198	3.84	New
BJP	Dr. A. Ganesan	848	0.63	New
Independent	A. P. Veeramani	780	0.58	New
Margin of victory		26,933	19.88	18.81
Turnout		135,462	76.73	10.04
Registered electors		176,537		
DMK hold		Swing	9.13	

=== 2001 ===
2001 Tamil Nadu Legislative Assembly election: Tiruvarur
Party	Candidate	Votes	%	±%
DMK	A. Asokan	58,425	47.63	−12.4
CPI(M)	K. Rengasamy	57,111	46.56	+29.61
MDMK	A. Kamalavendhan	2,846	2.32	New
Independent	S. Veerasamy	2,375	1.94	New
Independent	U. Ulaganathan	1,331	1.09	New
Margin of victory		1,314	1.07	−37.41
Turnout		122,652	66.70	−5.64
Registered electors		183,974		
DMK hold		Swing	-12.40	

=== 1996 ===
1996 Tamil Nadu Legislative Assembly election: Tiruvarur
Party	Candidate	Votes	%	±%
DMK	A. Asokan	69,212	60.03	New
INC	P. Arumuga Pandian	24,845	21.55	−24.84
CPI(M)	S. Veerasamy	19,551	16.96	−34.26
BJP	M. Ganesan	1,275	1.11	New
Margin of victory		44,367	38.48	33.65
Turnout		115,293	72.34	1.58
Registered electors		169,664		
DMK gain from CPI(M)		Swing	8.82	

=== 1991 ===
1991 Tamil Nadu Legislative Assembly election: Tiruvarur
Party	Candidate	Votes	%	±%
CPI(M)	V. Thambusamy	55,653	51.22	+3.47
INC	M. Ramasamy	50,406	46.39	+26.72
PMK	Pon. Subramanian	1,979	1.82	New
THMM	G. Pappaiyan	627	0.58	New
Margin of victory		5,247	4.83	−18.83
Turnout		108,665	70.75	−6.82
Registered electors		158,043		
CPI(M) hold		Swing	3.47	

=== 1989 ===
1989 Tamil Nadu Legislative Assembly election: Tiruvarur
Party	Candidate	Votes	%	±%
CPI(M)	V. Thambusamy	52,520	47.75	−8.25
AIADMK	Nagooran Raja	26,500	24.09	New
INC	Padma	21,637	19.67	−24.34
Independent	M. Kamaraj	8,543	7.77	New
Margin of victory		26,020	23.66	11.67
Turnout		109,995	77.58	−2.77
Registered electors		144,125		
CPI(M) hold		Swing	-8.25	

=== 1984 ===
1984 Tamil Nadu Legislative Assembly election: Tiruvarur
Party	Candidate	Votes	%	±%
CPI(M)	M. Sellamuthu	56,273	55.99	+5.81
INC	P. Selvadurai	44,227	44.01	New
Margin of victory		12,046	11.99	10.23
Turnout		100,500	80.35	5.25
Registered electors		131,246		
CPI(M) hold		Swing	5.81	

=== 1980 ===
1980 Tamil Nadu Legislative Assembly election: Tiruvarur
Party	Candidate	Votes	%	±%
CPI(M)	M. Sellamuthu	45,557	50.18	+22.29
DMK	Kovi. Kuppusamy	43,959	48.42	+4.15
JP	G. Pannerselvam (Manali Nethaji)	1,270	1.40	New
Margin of victory		1,598	1.76	−14.62
Turnout		90,786	75.10	1.37
Registered electors		121,907		
CPI(M) gain from DMK		Swing	5.91	

=== 1977 ===
1977 Tamil Nadu Legislative Assembly election: Tiruvarur
Party	Candidate	Votes	%	±%
DMK	M. Karunanithi Thazhai	38,528	44.27	−3.19
CPI(M)	P. S. Dhanushokody	24,274	27.89	+4.13
CPI	S. Thangaiyan	20,221	23.23	New
JP	K. M. Chellaiya	4,008	4.61	New
Margin of victory		14,254	16.38	−2.32
Turnout		87,031	73.73	−7.31
Registered electors		119,219		
DMK hold		Swing	-3.19	

=== 1971 ===
1971 Tamil Nadu Legislative Assembly election: Tiruvarur
Party	Candidate	Votes	%	±%
DMK	M. Karunanithi Thazhai	30,828	47.46	New
INC	V. Vedaiyan	18,686	28.77	−15.25
CPI(M)	V. Thambuchchamy	15,436	23.77	−24.28
Margin of victory		12,142	18.69	14.67
Turnout		64,950	81.04	−0.57
Registered electors		84,603		
DMK gain from CPI(M)		Swing	-0.58	

=== 1967 ===
1967 Madras Legislative Assembly election: Tiruvarur
Party	Candidate	Votes	%	±%
CPI(M)	P.S. Dhanushokody	30,510	48.04	New
INC	V. Vedaiyan	27,956	44.02	−0.87
CPI	S. Vadivel	5,040	7.94	−28.72
Margin of victory		2,554	4.02	−4.21
Turnout		63,506	81.62	6.50
Registered electors		80,116		
CPI(M) gain from INC		Swing	3.15	

=== 1962 ===
1962 Madras Legislative Assembly election: Tiruvarur
Party	Candidate	Votes	%	±%
INC	C. M. Ambikapathy	29,384	44.89	New
CPI	S. Vadivelu	23,993	36.66	New
SWA	Veeran Ilanchingam	10,658	16.28	New
Independent	N. Santhanam	1,419	2.17	New
Margin of victory		5,391	8.24	
Turnout		65,454	75.12	
Registered electors		90,165		
INC win (new seat)				
