= Kilvelur Assembly constituency =

One of the 234 State Legislative Assembly Constituencies in Tamil Nadu, in India

Coordinates: 10.6565924°N 79.6144682°E

Kilvelur
- Constituency No. 164 for the Tamil Nadu Legislative Assembly

Constituency details
- Country: India
- Region: South India
- State: Tamil Nadu
- District: Nagapattinam
- Lok Sabha constituency: Nagapattinam
- Established: 2008
- Total electors: 170,633
- Reservation: SC

Member of Legislative Assembly
- 17th Tamil Nadu Legislative Assembly
- Incumbent Latha.T
- Party: CPI(M)
- Alliance: LF
- Elected year: 2026

Kilvelur is a state assembly constituency in Tamil Nadu, India newly formed after constituency delimitations in 2008. It is included in Nagapattinam Lok Sabha constituency. It comprises Kilvelur, Keezhayur and a part of Nagapattinam panchayat union. It is one of the 234 State Legislative Assembly Constituencies in Tamil Nadu in India.

== Members of the Legislative Assembly ==
Year	Winner	Party
2011	Nagaimaali V P	Communist Party of India (Marxist)
2016	U. Mathivanan	Dravida Munnetra Kazhagam
2021	Nagaimaali V P	Communist Party of India (Marxist)
2026	Latha.T	Communist Party of India (Marxist)

== Election results ==
Vote share of winning candidates
2026	37%
2021	47.85%
2016	44.95%
2011	48.99%

=== 2026 ===
2026 Tamil Nadu Legislative Assembly election: Kilvelur
Party	Candidate	Votes	%	±%
CPI(M)	Latha.T	56,108	37.00	▼10.85
TVK	Senthil Pandian.P	53,830	35.50	New
PMK	Vadivel Ravanan.S	31,675	20.89	▼15.00
NTK	Karthika.M	8,069	5.32	▼5.36
PT	Surenthar.K	563	0.37	New
NOTA	NOTA	545	0.36	▼0.27
Aanaithinthiya Jananayaka Pathukappu Kazhagam	Vedha Mukundhan	437	0.29	New
Independent	Jaivishnudevi.M	410	0.27	New
Margin of victory		2,278	1.50	▼10.45
Turnout		1,51,637	88.87	▲9.35
Registered electors		1,70,633		▼8,053
CPI(M) hold		Swing	▼10.85	

=== 2021 ===
2021 Tamil Nadu Legislative Assembly election: Kilvelur
Party	Candidate	Votes	%	±%
CPI(M)	V. P. Nagaimaali	67,988	47.85%	+35.88
PMK	S. Vadivel Ravanan	51,003	35.89%	+33.98
NTK	S. Ponelavazhaki	15,173	10.68%	+9.55
MNM	G. Sidhu	2,906	2.05%	New
AMMK	M. Neethimohan	2,503	1.76%	New
NOTA	NOTA	896	0.63%	−0.13
Margin of victory		16,985	11.95%	4.58%
Turnout		142,099	79.52%	−4.88%
Rejected ballots		378	0.27%	
Registered electors		178,686		
CPI(M) gain from DMK		Swing	2.90%	

=== 2016 ===
2016 Tamil Nadu Legislative Assembly election: Kilvelur
Party	Candidate	Votes	%	±%
DMK	U. Mathivanan	61,999	44.95%	−3.44
AIADMK	N. Meena	51,829	37.58%	New
CPI(M)	V. P. Nagaimaali	16,499	11.96%	−37.03
PMK	A. Vanitha	2,637	1.91%	New
NTK	G. Palanivel	1,553	1.13%	New
BJP	S. Kumar	1,142	0.83%	New
NOTA	NOTA	1,049	0.76%	New
Margin of victory		10,170	7.37%	6.78%
Turnout		137,929	84.40%	−1.48%
Registered electors		163,415		
DMK gain from CPI(M)		Swing	-4.04%	

=== 2011 ===
2011 Tamil Nadu Legislative Assembly election: Kilvelur
Party	Candidate	Votes	%	±%
CPI(M)	V. P. Nagaimaali	59,402	48.99%	New
DMK	U. Mathivanan	58,678	48.39%	New
Independent	G. Devaki	1,487	1.23%	New
BSP	J. Shajahan	743	0.61%	New
Margin of victory		724	0.60%	
Turnout		121,254	85.88%	
Registered electors		141,185		
CPI(M) win (new seat)				
