= A. Devandiran =

Indian politician (born 1940)

Member-Tamil Nadu Legislative Assembly
- In office 1971–1976
- Preceded by: P. Jayaraj
- Succeeded by: M. Manimaran
- Constituency: Nannilam

Personal details
- Born: 22 February 1940 Mayiladuthurai
- Party: Dravida Munnetra Kazhagam
- Profession: Farmer

A. Devandiran is an Indian politician and a former member of the Tamil Nadu Legislative Assembly. His home town is Kurainadu in Mayiladuthurai district. He studied up to the tenth standard at Mayiladuthurai High School. Devandiran belongs to the Dravida Munnetra Kazhagam (DMK). In the 1971 Tamil Nadu Legislative Assembly election, he contested and won the Nannilam Assembly constituency, becoming a Member of the Legislative Assembly (MLA).Tamil Nadu Legislative Assembly

== Electoral Performance ==
=== 1971 ===
1971 Tamil Nadu Legislative Assembly election: Nannilam
Party	Candidate	Votes	%	±%
DMK	A. Devandiran	36,740	59.42%	New
INC	V. S. Arunachalam	21,432	34.66%	−11.7
CPI(M)	K. S. Packirisamy	3,663	5.92%	−28.9
Margin of victory		15,308	24.76%	13.22%
Turnout		61,835	80.63%	−1.15%
Registered electors		79,081		
DMK gain from INC		Swing	13.05%	
