= G. Palanisamy =

Indian politician

G. Palanisamy is an Indian politician and former Member of the Legislative Assembly of Tamil Nadu. He was elected to the Tamil Nadu legislative assembly as a Communist Party of India (CPI) candidate from Tiruthuraipundi constituency in 1989, 1991, 1996 and 2001 elections. The constituency was reserved for candidates from the Scheduled Castes.

Palanisamy was a deputy secretary of the CPI at the time of the 2011 assembly elections. He contested the Nagapattinam Lok Sabha constituency in the 2014 Indian general election, when the CPI were in an alliance with the Communist Party of India (Marxist) following the collapse of an electoral pact with the All India Anna Dravida Munnetra Kazhagam (AIADMK). The seat was won by the AIADMK.
