= Nagai Asokan =

Indian politician

A.Asokan
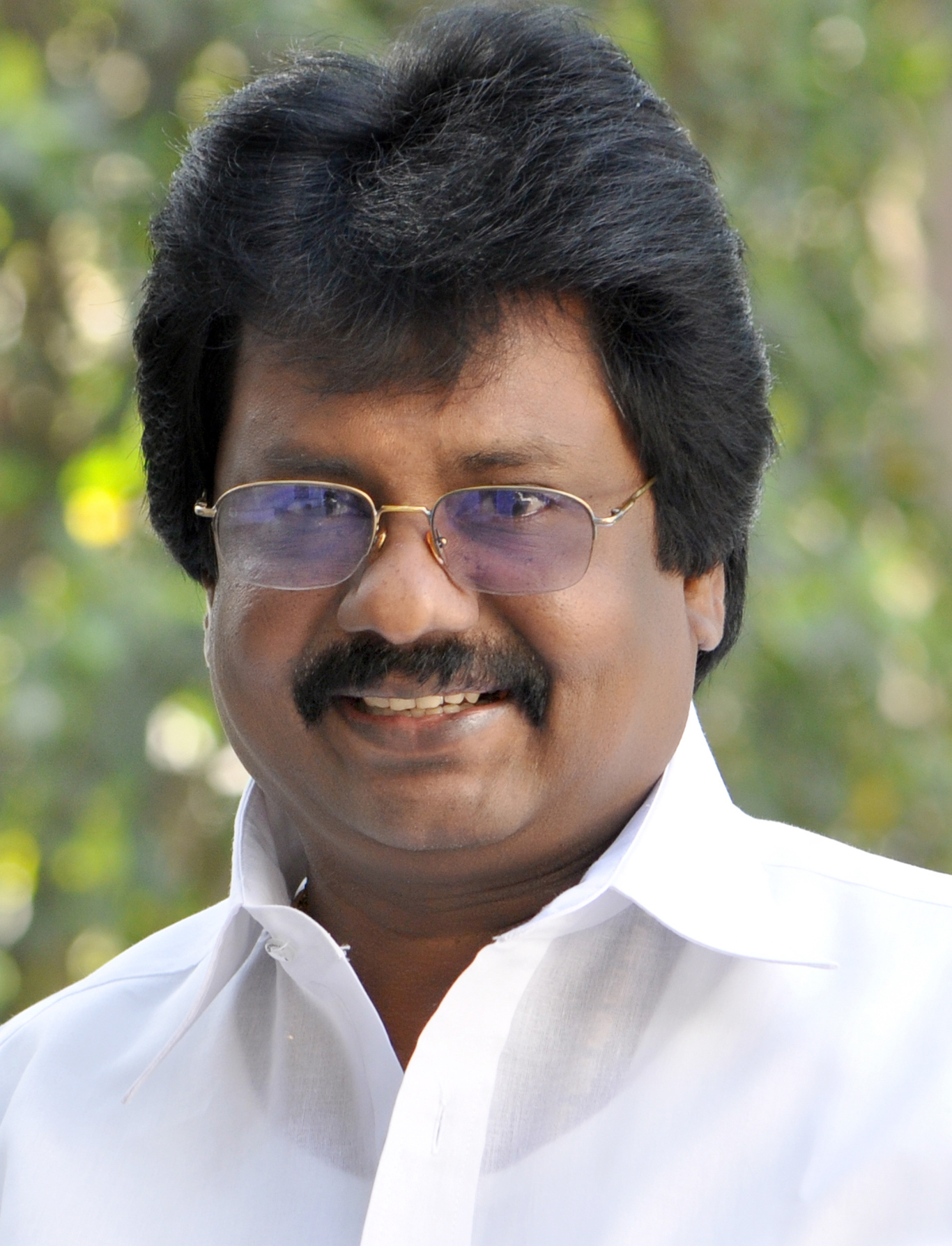

Personal details
- Born: Asokan; 7 January 1959 (age 67) Nagapattinam, Madras State, India
- Party: Dravida Munnetra Kazhagam
- Spouse: Sinduja Asokan
- Children: • Anjugam NaveenKumar; • Aravindhan Asokan
- Occupation: Social Worker

A. Asokan, also called Nagai Asokan, is an Indian politician and was a Member of the Legislative Assembly of Tamil Nadu. He was elected to the Tamil Nadu legislative assembly as a Dravida Munnetra Kazhagam (DMK) candidate from Tiruvarur constituency in the 1996 and 2001 elections. He was appointed as DMK Youth wing Deputy Secretary and Member of Executive committee Dravida Munnetra Kazhagam (DMK) in 2000.

In April 2006, Asokan left the DMK to join the All India Anna Dravida Munnetra Kazhagam (AIADMK). The DMK had denied him the opportunity to stand as their candidate in the 2006 elections. In 2011 he was appointed as Special Representative Of Tamil Nadu Government at New Delhi by J.Jayalalithaa party leader of All India Anna Dravida Munnetra Kazhagam (AIADMK). Later, In March 2019, Asokan quits All India Anna Dravida Munnetra Kazhagam (AIADMK) and met M. K. Stalin to join the Dravida Munnetra Kazhagam (DMK).
