= K. Poondi Kalaivanan =

Indian politician

K. Kalaivanan

Member of the Tamil Nadu Legislative Assembly
- Incumbent
- Assumed office 07 January 2019
- Preceded by: M. Karunanidhi
- Constituency: Thiruvarur

Personal details
- Born: Kalaivanan; 12 May 1964 (age 62) Poondi, Thanjavur district, Tamil nadu India
- Party: Dravida Munnetra Kazhagam
- Parent: Krishnasamy (father)

Krishnasamy Poondi Kalaivanan is an Indian politician from Tamil Nadu.He is a two time Member of the Legislative Assembly of Tamil Nadu. He was elected to the Tamil Nadu legislative assembly as a Dravida Munnetra Kazhagam candidate from Tiruvarur constituency in the by-election in 2019.
