= M. Selvarasu =

Indian politician (1957–2024)

Member of Parliament, Lok Sabha
- In office 23 May 2019 – 13 May 2024
- Preceded by: K. Gopal (AIADMK politician)
- Succeeded by: Selvaraj V
- In office 10 May 1996 – 6 October 1999
- Preceded by: A. K. S. Vijayan
- Succeeded by: Padma
- In office 1989–1991
- Preceded by: Padma
- Succeeded by: M. Mahalingam
- Constituency: Nagapattinam

Personal details
- Born: 16 March 1957 Kappaludaiyan, Thanjavur District, Madras State, India
- Died: 13 May 2024 (aged 67) Chennai, Tamil Nadu, India
- Party: Communist Party of India
- Spouse: Smt. Kamalavathanam
- Relations: S. G. Murugaiyan (father-in-law)
- Children: 1
- Parent: K. Muniyan (father)
- Education: Thiru.Vi.Ka Government Arts college, Thiruvarur, Tamil Nadu
- Occupation: Agriculturist, Political and Social Worker

Muniyan Selvarasu (16 March 1957 – 13 May 2024) was an Indian politician and Member of Parliament, elected from Tamil Nadu.

== Political career ==
Selvarasu was a member of the 17th Lok Sabha of India. He represented the Nagapattinam Lok Sabha constituency of Tamil Nadu and was a member of the Communist Party of India (CPI). He was also elected to the Lok Sabha from Nagapattinam constituency in the 1989, 1996 and 1998 elections.

=== Elections contested ===
| Elections | Constituency | Party | Result | Vote percentage | Opposition Candidate | Opposition Party | Opposition vote percentage |
|---|---|---|---|---|---|---|---|
| 1989 Indian general election | Nagapattinam | CPI | Won | 48.78 | Veeramurasu N.S | INC | 46 |
| 1991 Indian general election | Nagapattinam | CPI | Lost | 44 | Padma | INC | 48 |
| 1996 Indian general election | Nagapattinam | CPI | Won | 54.17 | Kannivannan M | INC | 23.77 |
| 1998 Indian general election | Nagapattinam | CPI | Won | 59 | K. Gopal | AIADMK | 38 |
| 1999 Indian general election | Nagapattinam | CPI | Lost | 45 | A. K. S. Vijayan | DMK | 49 |
| 2009 Indian general election | Nagapattinam | CPI | Lost | 42 | A. K. S. Vijayan | DMK | 48 |
| 2019 Indian general election | Nagapattinam | CPI | Won | 52 | Saravanan M | AIADMK | 31 |

== Death ==
Selvarasu died in Chennai on 13 May 2024, at the age of 67, just 10 days before the end of his third term as MP for Nagapattinam.
