= P. Uthirapathy =

Indian politician

P. Uthirapathy is an Indian politician and former Member of the Legislative Assembly of Tamil Nadu. He was elected to the Tamil Nadu legislative assembly as a Communist Party of India candidate from Tiruthuraipundi constituency in 1977 and 1984 elections and as a Communist Party of India (Marxist) candidate in 1980 election.
