= A. K. S. Vijayan =

Indian politician

A.K.S. Vijayan

Agriculture Wing Secretary of the Dravida Munnetra Kazhagam
- Incumbent
- Assumed office 2017

Special Representative of the Government of Tamil Nadu to Delhi
- In office 16 June 2021 – 27 June 2026

Member of Parliament, Lok Sabha
- In office 6 October 1999 – 16 May 2014
- Preceded by: M. Selvarasu
- Succeeded by: K. Gopal

Personal details
- Born: 15 December 1961 (age 64) Thiruvarur, India
- Party: DMK
- Parent: A. K. Subbiah (father)
- As of 27 June, 2026

A. K. Subbiah Vijayan (born 15 December 1961) is an Indian Politician and a former Member of Parliament of India. He was elected from the Nagapattinam constituency of Tamil Nadu as a member of the Dravida Munnetra Kazhagam (DMK) political party three times in 1999, 2004 and 2009 respectively. He is the son of veteran Communist leader and former Tamil Nadu MLA, A. K. Subbiah and S. Subbammal.

== Political career ==
He was selected for 13th, 14th and 15th Lok Sabha also and has led the DMK MPs in Lok Sabha. He got appointed Tamil Nadu Government Special Representative to Delhi in June 2021.

== Elections contested and positions held ==
=== Lok Sabha Elections ===
Elections	Constituency	Party	Result	Vote percentage	Opposition Candidate	Opposition Party	Opposition vote percentage
1999 Indian general election	Nagapattinam	DMK	Won	50	M. Selvarasu	CPI	47
2004 Indian general election	Nagapattinam	DMK	Won	62	Arjunan P.J	AIADMK	33
2009 Indian general election	Nagapattinam	DMK	Won	48	M. Selvarasu	CPI	42
2014 Indian general election	Nagapattinam	DMK	Lost	34	K. Gopal	AIADMK	46

=== Positions held ===
- 1999-2004 : was Elected to Lok Sabha (Thirteenth) for the 1st time
- 2004-2009 : was Elected to Lok Sabha (Fourteenth) for the 2nd time
- 2009-2014 : was Elected to Lok Sabha (Fifteenth) for the 3rd time
- 2021-incumbent : was appointed Delhi Special Representative of the Government of Tamil Nadu
