= M. Ayyakkannu =

Indian politician

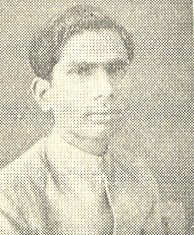

Member of Parliament, Lok Sabha
- In office 5 April 1957 – 31 March 1962
- Preceded by: Constituency established
- Succeeded by: Gopalsamy Thenkondar; V. Sambasivan
- Constituency: Nagapattinam (SC), Madras State

Personal details
- Born: 15 August 1927 Ladapuram, Trichinopoly District, Madras Presidency, British India
- Party: Indian National Congress
- Spouse: Bhuvanasweri
- Children: 3
- Education: B.A.
- Alma mater: Annamalai University; Madras Law College

M. Ayyakkannu (born 15 August 1927) was an Indian politician from the state of Madras. He was born in Ladapuram village, Trichinopoly District., in the Madras Presidency (present day Perambalur district of Tamil Nadu). He was the son of S. Muthusamy. After studying at Annamalai University in Chidambaram and the Madras Law College, he obtained a B.A. (Honours) degree. In 1949, he became the secretary of the Social Service League at Annamalai University, and became chairman of the History and Politics Association in 1951. He served as Secretary of the Madras Depressed Class Youth Association.

He married Bhuvanasweri in 1953 and had three children (two sons and one daughter). He was elected to the Lok Sabha (lower house of the Parliament of India) from Nagapattinam constituency in the 1957 Indian general election, contesting as the Indian National Congress candidate for the seat reserved for Scheduled Castes. In later years, he lived in Anna Nagar West in Chennai.
