= Mannargudi Raju Sastri =

Raja Mannargudi Mahamahopadhyaya Thyagaraja Mahi Raju Sastrigal (28 May 1815 – 4 March 1903), also known as Mannargudi Raju Sastri or Mannargudi Periyaval, was a Hindu scholar. He was born in the Bharadwaja Vamsa, as a descendant of Adayappaalam Sri Appayya Dikshitar. Raju Sastri was born in the village of Kuthambadi in today's Thiruvarur district as son of Maragathavalli Janakiammal and Sri Markasahaya Appa Dikshitar

== Gurukul ==
Sastri went back to Mannargudi and set up his gurukul and started teaching many students. He lived in Agraharam First Street, door number 73, and taught veda sastra, anushtanams and granta for thousands of students for over sixty years. Scholars, disciples and devotees address him with reverence as Mannargudi Periyaval with great respect even today. Students flocked to learn from this scholar. People came from Maharashtra, Telugu Desam, Palakadu and from far away places to live and learn from him. Many rich vidwans and scholars saw his sincere teachings and funded the gurukul and made food donations to the students who lived there. Raju Sastri conducted Somayagam for his father Sri Appa Dikshitar in 1864. As per his father's wish, Raju Sastri adopted his brother Appaiya Dikshitar's son Neelakanda Sastri. Raju Sastri had many disciples in his Gurukul and he loved to teach them. His adopted son Neelakanta Sastrigal looked after the administration of the Gurukul. Raju Sastri divided his students into different sections according to their knowledge and taught them the Sastras according to their level. There were even sanyasis who were his students. The house on the East Main Road in Rajamannargudi town where he lived later became Sankara Mutt, thanks to the Paramacharya.

== Students ==
Many of Sastri's students went on to become famous scholars. The following is a list of some of these students.

- Paiganadu Ganapathy Sastri
- Nadukaveri Srinivasa Sastri
- Pazhavaneri Sundara Sastri
- Goshtipuram Harihara Sastri
- Thirupathy Venkatasubramanya Sastri
- Mallari Ramakrishna Sastri
- Paruthiyur Krishna Sastrigal
- Kasi Brahmananda Swamigal
- Balakrishnananda Swamigal
- Ramakrishannanda Swamigal
- Mahadevasramigal
- Dakshinamurthy Swamigal
- Maharashtra Swamigal
- Satchidananda Swamigal
- Tenaangulam Vaishnavas
- Neelakanda Sastri
- Yegnaswami Sastri
- Sithamalli Sri Subramanya Shastrigal Yateendral

== Teachings ==
Initially Raju Sastri was a very different teacher. He was very particular that all his students followed his instructions and would be very upset if a student made even a small mistake. He would yell at them with anger and the whole neighbourhood could hear him being annoyed. Then after a while he would explain and correct the mistake very elaborately to the whole class so that no student would make the same mistake again ever. He did not encourage arguments and discussion and wanted students to follow very strict class procedures. He would dismiss students who did not follow his strict code of conduct. Early in the morning, Guru Raju Sastri would go north to the river near Kailasanathar temple for his daily bath. While all his students went south to the river Padithurai near Meenakshi Amman temple for their bath. It is even said that Raju Sastri once dismissed and suspended his student Paruthiyur Krishna Sastri mistaking his arguments to be an act of arrogance. Krishna Sastri left the Gurukul to do Ramayana Pravachans, which became very popular. Raju Sastri happened to listen to this pravachan, after hearing about it from his other students. The discourses were on the virtues of Sri Rama. Sastri listened to the discourse on "Patience" as the greatest virtue of all. Raju Sastri was very impressed and said that Krishna Sastri's Pravachan had opened his eyes. 'I have myself learnt a lot from his description of Sri Rama's virtues. Krishna Sastri you are a Mahaanubhavan, you will bring great joy to many people. Raju Sastri recognised Krishna Sastri's scholarship and decided to train and teach him and mould him to become a great scholar. Raju Sastri became a different man after that. Raju Sastri was famed as a teacher known for his simplicity, patience and compassion.

== Knowledge ==
Raju Sastrigal had learned all four Sastras and was a very knowledgeable man. He addressed several issues by answering the queries on Dharma Sastram and acharam, often posed to him by Vedic scholars and pundits. His authority on the administration of Dharma made many legal luminaries come to him seeking his advice on issues concerning Hindu law. Publishers and authors made it a point to obtain his foreword for their works. He also offered counselling to people of different faiths explaining the common goal of all religions.

== Works ==
Sri Raju Sastrigal authored more than 30 books. Some of them include:

- Sath Vidya vilasam
- Vedantha Vadhasankragam
- Upathivichara
- Brahma Vidhya Tharangini Vyagyanam
- Niyayethu Sekaram
- Advaitha Siddhi
- Sama Rudra Samhita Bashyam
- Siva Thathuva Viveka Deepika
- Siva Mahima Viveka Deepika
- Siva Mahima Kalikka Sthuthi
- Shiva Mahima Stuti Vyakyanam
- Purushartha Prabodha Sankaraha
- Durjanokthi Nirasam
- Cauvery Navarathnamalika
- Thiyagarajasthwam
- Thamrabharneestvam
- Kaveristhvam
- Dikshithanavaratnamalalika
- Dhikshithvamsaabharanam

In the Malika, Sri Sastrigal had composed songs on the annual rituals and important festivals being celebrated at Sri Tyagaraja Swami Temple Tiruvarur and Sri Rajagopala Swami Temple, Mannargudi.

== Title ==
In commemoration of the coronation of Queen Victoria in 1887, Raju Sastrigal was selected from the south for the title Mahamahopadhyaya and was invited to Delhi for the award ceremony. Since Sri Sastrigal refused to go to receive the award, the then Governor General directed the then Collector of Thanjavur to confer the title at his residence. Mannargudi Raju Sastri was the first from the south to receive such a prestigious title. After this title, gifts and felicitations were sent to him from the Thanjavur Collector. Learned scholars came from far away places to meet him every day.

Raju Sastri had formed the "Kumbakonam Advaita Sabha" for propagating the tenets of the Advaita faith. After him, his chief disciple Shi Ganapathy Sastrigal, who was invested with the title of Mahamahopadyaya, became the accredited pundit for this Sabha.

== Works on Raju Sastri ==
Thyagaraja Vijayam, in Sanskrit written by Mahamahopadyaya Yegnaswami Sastrigal, grandson of Sri Raju Sastri, is an elaborate history of Sri Mannargudi Raju Sastri. The main features of this book were then translated into Tamil in the name "Sri Raju Sastrigalin Mahimai" by great-grandson Sri Ya: Mahalinga Sastri MABL. The book describes Sri Mannargudi Raju Sastri's life, scholarship in Veda Sastras, his faith in daily rituals, his love for his students, his compositions and greatness of some of his popular disciples.

Both Thulasendrapuram Ganapathy Sastri and Paruthiyur Sri Krishna Sastri wrote slokas in praise of Guru Raju Sastri. One of his main disciples, late Mahamahopadhyaya Painganadu Ganapathi Sastrigal, wrote Gururajasapthathy, a set of seventy slokas on his Guru. He has described therein the qualities of Raju Sastri, his intellect, his treatment of his students, and his devotion to Lord Shiva.

== Last days ==
In 1903 Raju Sastri, at 88 years old, became very weak and he could not even get up or move around without help. His daughter-in-law took very good care of him. Aged Guru Raju Sastri wanted to hear Krishna Sastri's Pravachans and he sent his wish through a student. Considering his old Guru's age and health, Krishna Sastri immediately went to Mannargudi and stayed there for a few months and did Ramayana Pravachans exclusively for guru Raju Sastri and his family, friends and students. Raju Sastri was delighted and was very proud of his student. Sri Sastrigal attained mukthi at the age of 88 on 4 March 1903, with the entire town mourning over his demise.

Raju Sastri Jayanthi celebrations of Mannargudi Periyaval take place in Mannargudi each year, sponsored by the Mannargudi-based Sankara Arogya Seva Trust in 2008 and from 2009 onwards sponsored by Mannargudi periyava Seva Samithi formed by the descendants of Mannargudi periyava, with the blessings of Sri Sri Sri Jeyandra Saraswathi Swamigal Kanchi Kamakoti peetam.

== See also ==
- Sri Vaidhyanatha Dikshitar Sengalipuram Muthanna
- Advaita
