= A. K. Subbiah =

Indian politician

Member of the Legislative Assembly to Tamil Nadu Legislative Assembly
- In office 1967–1977
- Preceded by: Constituency established
- Succeeded by: Constituency cancelled
- Constituency: Kottur
- In office 1962–1967
- Preceded by: A. Vedarathnam and V. Vedayyan
- Succeeded by: N. Dharmalingam
- Constituency: Thiruthuraipoondi

Personal details
- Born: Tiruvarur, Tamil Nadu
- Party: CPI
- Spouse: S. Subbammal
- Children: A. K. S. Vijayan

A. K. Subbiah is an Indian Politician and a former Member of Parliament of India. He was elected from the Thiruthuraipoondi in 1962 and from the Kottur in 1967 and 1971. His son, A. K. S. Vijayan serves as the Delhi Special Representative of Tamilnadu Government and was a three-time Member of Parliament of India from Nagapattinam constituency of Tamil Nadu.

== Elections contested and positions held ==
=== Tamilnadu State Assembly Elections ===
Elections	Constituency	Party	Result	Vote percentage	Opposition Candidate	Opposition Party	Opposition vote percentage
1962 Madras Legislative Assembly election	Thiruthuraipoondi	CPI	Won	56.28	V. Vedaiyan	INC	43.72
1967 Madras Legislative Assembly election	Kottur	CPI	Won	42.47	C. M. Ambikapathy	INC	34.13
1971 Tamil Nadu Legislative Assembly election	Kottur	CPI	Won	73.26	T. Rajamanickam	INC	26.74
