= M. Sellamuthu =

Indian politician

M. Sellamuthu is an Indian politician and former Member of the Legislative Assembly of Tamil Nadu. He was elected to the Tamil Nadu legislative assembly as a Communist Party of India (Marxist) candidate from Tiruvarur constituency in 1980 and 1984 elections.
