= M. C. Muthukumaraswami =

Indian politician

M. C. Muthukumaraswami is an Indian politician and former Member of the Legislative Assembly of Tamil Nadu. He was elected to the Tamil Nadu legislative assembly as an Indian National Congress candidate from Nannilam constituency in 1952 and 1957 elections. He was one of the two winners in both elections, the other being M. D. Thyagaraja Pillai.
