= V. Thambusamy =

Indian politician

V. Thambusamy is an Indian politician and former Member of the Legislative Assembly of Tamil Nadu. He was elected to the Tamil Nadu legislative assembly as a Communist Party of India (Marxist) candidate from Tiruvarur constituency in 1989 and 1991 elections.
