= Nannilam Assembly constituency =

One of the 234 State Legislative Assembly Constituencies in Tamil Nadu, in India

Coordinates: 10.88°N 79.62°E

Nannilam
- Constituency No. 169 for the Tamil Nadu Legislative Assembly

Constituency details
- Country: India
- Region: South India
- State: Tamil Nadu
- District: Tiruvarur
- Lok Sabha constituency: Nagapattinam
- Established: 1951
- Total electors: 267,432
- Reservation: None

Member of Legislative Assembly
- 17th Tamil Nadu Legislative Assembly
- Incumbent R. Kamaraj
- Party: AIADMK
- Alliance: NDA
- Elected year: 2026

Nannilam is a state assembly constituency in Thiruvarur district in Tamil Nadu. It is one of the 234 State Legislative Assembly Constituencies in Tamil Nadu, in India. It was previously reserved for Scheduled Castes but was reclassified as a general constituency for the 2011 general election. Election results and winners for this constituency are listed below.

== Members of Legislative Assembly ==
Year	Winner	Party
Madras State
1952	M. C. Muthukumaraswami	Indian National Congress
1952	M. D. Thyagaraja Pillai	Indian National Congress
1957	M. D. Thyagaraja Pillai	Indian National Congress
1957	M. C. Muthukumaraswami	Indian National Congress
1962	M. D. Thyagaraja Pillai	Indian National Congress
1967	P. Jayaraj	Indian National Congress
Tamil Nadu
1971	A. Devandiran	Dravida Munnetra Kazhagam
1977	M. Manimaran	Dravida Munnetra Kazhagam
1980	A. Kalaiarasan	All India Anna Dravida Munnetra Kazhagam
1984	M. Manimaran	Dravida Munnetra Kazhagam
1989	M. Manimaran	Dravida Munnetra Kazhagam
1991	K. Gopal	All India Anna Dravida Munnetra Kazhagam
1996	Padma	Tamil Maanila Congress (Moopanar)
2001	C. K. Thamizharasan	Tamil Maanila Congress (Moopanar)
2006	P. Padmavathy	Communist Party of India
2011	R. Kamaraj	All India Anna Dravida Munnetra Kazhagam
2016	R. Kamaraj	All India Anna Dravida Munnetra Kazhagam
2021	R. Kamaraj	All India Anna Dravida Munnetra Kazhagam
2026	R. Kamaraj	All India Anna Dravida Munnetra Kazhagam

== Election results ==
Vote share of winning candidates
2026	44.70%
2021	46.95%
2016	49.43%
2011	50.96%
2006	51.46%
2001	46.11%
1996	61.37%
1991	56.79%
1989	45.08%
1984	51.72%
1980	52.73%
1977	41.75%
1971	59.42%
1967	46.36%
1962	39.78%
1957	25.89%
1952	20.27%

=== 2026 ===
2026 Tamil Nadu Legislative Assembly election: Nannilam
Party	Candidate	Votes	%	±%
AIADMK	Kamaraj.R	103,462	44.70	▼2.25
DMK	Mohamed Mubarak	61,738	26.68	▼18.26
TVK	S. Prabhakaran	54,530	23.56	New
NTK	Thenmozhi Dilipkumar	8,446	3.65	▼2.43
NOTA	NOTA	936	0.40	▼0.14
Margin of victory		41,724	18.02	▲16.02
Turnout		2,17,875	83.75	▲2.64
Registered electors		2,67,576		▼4,581
AIADMK hold		Swing	▼2.25	

=== 2021 ===
2021 Tamil Nadu Legislative Assembly election: Nannilam
Party	Candidate	Votes	%	±%
AIADMK	R. Kamaraj	103,637	46.95%	−2.49
DMK	S. Jothiraman	99,213	44.94%	New
NTK	S. Fathima Farhana	13,419	6.08%	+5.17
AMMK	N. Ramachandran	2,076	0.94%	New
NOTA	NOTA	1,190	0.54%	−0.53
Margin of victory		4,424	2.00%	−8.42%
Turnout		220,754	81.11%	0.61%
Rejected ballots		305	0.14%	
Registered electors		272,157		
AIADMK hold		Swing	-2.49%	

=== 2016 ===
2016 Tamil Nadu Legislative Assembly election: Nannilam
Party	Candidate	Votes	%	±%
AIADMK	R. Kamaraj	100,918	49.43%	−1.52
INC	S. M. B. Durai Velan	79,642	39.01%	New
CPI(M)	G. Sundara Moorthy	11,327	5.55%	New
PMK	E. Elavarasan	5,060	2.48%	New
NOTA	NOTA	2,182	1.07%	New
NTK	S. Anbuselvam	1,860	0.91%	New
Margin of victory		21,276	10.42%	4.66%
Turnout		204,154	80.50%	−2.05%
Registered electors		253,606		
AIADMK hold		Swing	-1.52%	

=== 2011 ===
2011 Tamil Nadu Legislative Assembly election: Nannilam
Party	Candidate	Votes	%	±%
AIADMK	R. Kamaraj	92,071	50.96%	+8.57
DMK	R. Elangovan	81,667	45.20%	New
IJK	G. Ganesan	2,835	1.57%	New
BSP	T. Immanuvel	1,247	0.69%	New
Independent	K. N. Panasaiarangan	1,211	0.67%	New
Margin of victory		10,404	5.76%	−3.31%
Turnout		218,867	82.55%	6.04%
Registered electors		180,684		
AIADMK gain from CPI		Swing	-0.50%	

=== 2006 ===
2006 Tamil Nadu Legislative Assembly election: Nannilam
Party	Candidate	Votes	%	±%
CPI	P. Padmavathy	65,614	51.46%	New
AIADMK	K. Arivanandam	54,048	42.39%	New
DMDK	R. Rajendran	4,989	3.91%	New
Independent	S. Rajendran	1,483	1.16%	New
BJP	R. Sooriyamoorthy	1,377	1.08%	New
Margin of victory		11,566	9.07%	−7.82%
Turnout		127,511	76.51%	10.00%
Registered electors		166,654		
CPI gain from TMC(M)		Swing	5.35%	

=== 2001 ===
2001 Tamil Nadu Legislative Assembly election: Nannilam
Party	Candidate	Votes	%	±%
TMC(M)	C. K. Thamizharasan	52,450	46.11%	New
DMK	P. Sakthivel	33,238	29.22%	New
Independent	M. Manimaran	24,623	21.65%	New
MDMK	Ravanan G	3,440	3.02%	New
Margin of victory		19,212	16.89%	−16.17%
Turnout		113,751	66.51%	−6.63%
Registered electors		171,039		
TMC(M) hold		Swing	-15.26%	

=== 1996 ===
1996 Tamil Nadu Legislative Assembly election: Nannilam
Party	Candidate	Votes	%	±%
TMC(M)	Padma	66,773	61.37%	New
AIADMK	K. Gopal	30,800	28.31%	−28.48
CPI(M)	P. Thangaiyan	10,291	9.46%	New
Margin of victory		35,973	33.06%	16.94%
Turnout		108,798	73.15%	0.69%
Registered electors		160,652		
TMC(M) gain from AIADMK		Swing	4.59%	

=== 1991 ===
1991 Tamil Nadu Legislative Assembly election: Nannilam
Party	Candidate	Votes	%	±%
AIADMK	K. Gopal	60,623	56.79%	+30.12
DMK	M. Manimaran	43,415	40.67%	−4.41
PMK	R. Chellaiyan	2,715	2.54%	New
Margin of victory		17,208	16.12%	−2.30%
Turnout		106,753	72.45%	−6.89%
Registered electors		152,477		
AIADMK gain from DMK		Swing	11.71%	

=== 1989 ===
1989 Tamil Nadu Legislative Assembly election: Nannilam
Party	Candidate	Votes	%	±%
DMK	M. Manimaran	48,605	45.08%	−6.64
AIADMK	A. Kalaiyarasan	28,750	26.67%	−20.4
INC	P. Selvadurai	24,737	22.94%	New
AIADMK	R. Aruchunan	5,721	5.31%	−41.76
Margin of victory		19,855	18.42%	13.76%
Turnout		107,813	79.35%	−2.29%
Registered electors		138,255		
DMK hold		Swing	-6.64%	

=== 1984 ===
1984 Tamil Nadu Legislative Assembly election: Nannilam
Party	Candidate	Votes	%	±%
DMK	M. Manimaran	50,072	51.72%	+5.03
AIADMK	S. Anbarasan	45,564	47.06%	−5.67
INC(J)	K. Gopalan	722	0.75%	New
Margin of victory		4,508	4.66%	−1.39%
Turnout		96,813	81.64%	7.17%
Registered electors		123,430		
DMK gain from AIADMK		Swing	-1.01%	

=== 1980 ===
1980 Tamil Nadu Legislative Assembly election: Nannilam
Party	Candidate	Votes	%	±%
AIADMK	A. Kalaiarasan	44,829	52.73%	+30.27
DMK	M. Manimaran	39,689	46.69%	+4.94
Independent	K. Balasundaram	495	0.58%	New
Margin of victory		5,140	6.05%	−5.26%
Turnout		85,013	74.47%	2.13%
Registered electors		115,349		
AIADMK gain from DMK		Swing	10.98%	

=== 1977 ===
1977 Tamil Nadu Legislative Assembly election: Nannilam
Party	Candidate	Votes	%	±%
DMK	M. Manimaran	33,636	41.75%	−17.67
INC	P. Jayaraj	24,527	30.44%	−4.22
AIADMK	A. Klaiyarasan	18,099	22.46%	New
JP	P. Kannaiyan	4,304	5.34%	New
Margin of victory		9,109	11.31%	−13.45%
Turnout		80,566	72.33%	−8.30%
Registered electors		112,720		
DMK hold		Swing	-17.67%	

=== 1971 ===
1971 Tamil Nadu Legislative Assembly election: Nannilam
Party	Candidate	Votes	%	±%
DMK	A. Devandiran	36,740	59.42%	New
INC	V. S. Arunachalam	21,432	34.66%	−11.7
CPI(M)	K. S. Packirisamy	3,663	5.92%	−28.9
Margin of victory		15,308	24.76%	13.22%
Turnout		61,835	80.63%	−1.15%
Registered electors		79,081		
DMK gain from INC		Swing	13.05%	

=== 1967 ===
1967 Madras Legislative Assembly election: Nannilam
Party	Candidate	Votes	%	±%
INC	P. Jayaraj	26,053	46.36%	+6.59
CPI(M)	T. P. Ramachandran	19,571	34.83%	New
CPI	P. Appasami	10,568	18.81%	−8.93
Margin of victory		6,482	11.54%	4.25%
Turnout		56,192	81.78%	2.09%
Registered electors		73,780		
INC hold		Swing	6.59%	

=== 1962 ===
1962 Madras Legislative Assembly election: Nannilam
Party	Candidate	Votes	%	±%
INC	M. D. Thyagaraja Pillai	26,346	39.78%	+13.88
DMK	Ramiah Mudaliar	21,519	32.49%	New
CPI	N. Sourirajalu Naidu	18,370	27.73%	+11.83
Margin of victory		4,827	7.29%	1.27%
Turnout		66,235	79.69%	−27.50%
Registered electors		85,864		
INC hold		Swing	13.88%	

=== 1957 ===
1957 Madras Legislative Assembly election: Nannilam
Party	Candidate	Votes	%	±%
INC	M. D. Thyagaraja Pillai	45,923	25.89%	+5.62
INC	M. C. Muthukumaraswami	35,258	19.88%	−0.39
CPI	S. Arunachalam Pillai	28,206	15.90%	+1.57
CPI	P. Appaswamy (Sc)	25,515	14.39%	+0.05
Independent	K. Periaswamy Odayar	21,571	12.16%	New
Independent	M. Natesan (Sc)	8,617	4.86%	New
Independent	T. Somasundaram	6,288	3.55%	New
Independent	T. Rajappa (Sc)	5,971	3.37%	New
Margin of victory		10,665	6.01%	2.33%
Turnout		177,349	107.19%	−7.39%
Registered electors		165,455		
INC hold		Swing	5.62%	

=== 1952 ===
1952 Madras Legislative Assembly election: Nannilam
Party	Candidate	Votes	%	±%
INC	M. C. Muthukumaraswami	32,356	20.27%	New
INC	M. D. Thyagaraja Pillai	26,482	16.59%	New
CPI	Marianathan Alias Anthoni Muthu	22,877	14.33%	New
CPI	Kalyanasundaram Pillai	19,672	12.33%	New
Independent	M. Ramadoss Mudaliar	16,206	10.15%	New
Independent	Mohamed Mohideen	14,053	8.81%	New
Independent	S. Rangaramanujan Naidu	9,977	6.25%	New
Socialist Party (India)	Kandasami Pillai	6,172	3.87%	New
Socialist Party (India)	Murugian Alias Murugan	6,169	3.87%	New
Independent	Varadachariar	2,823	1.77%	New
Independent	Kaailasa Ayyar	2,811	1.76%	New
Margin of victory		5,874	3.68%	
Turnout		159,598	114.58%	
Registered electors		139,289		
INC win (new seat)				
