= 1979 Nagapattinam by-election =

Indian political election

1979 Nagapattinam (SC) Lok Sabha seat by-election
- 17 June 1979

Candidate	K. Murugaiyan	M. Mahalingam
Party	CPI	AIADMK

On 17 June 1979 a by-election was held in for the Nagapattinam seat in the Lok Sabha (lower house of the parliament of India). The by-election was called after the murder of the incumbent Communist Party of India parliamentarian S.G. Murugaiyan, one of three prominent communist leaders killed in the state of Tamil Nadu in 1979. The Nagapattinam constituency was reserved for Scheduled Castes.

By 1979, CPI had moved away from the Indian National Congress (I). The CPI candidate K. Murugaiyan had the support from the Dravida Munnetra Kazhagam and the Communist Party of India (Marxist). The CPI candidate, himself a bonded labourer, had overwhelming support from the Dalit communities in the constituency.

The All India Anna Dravida Munnetra Kazhagam candidate M. Mahalingam had the support from the Congress(I). The Nagapattinam by-election was held simultaneously as a by-election in the Thanjavur Lok Sabha constituency. AIADMK supported the Congress(I) candidate in Thanjavur, and AIADMK supremo M.G. Ramachandran toured both constituencies during the election campaign. Nevertheless, the Congress(I) leader Indira Gandhi only campaigned in Thanjavur.

== Result ==
Candidate	Party	Votes	%
K. Murugaiyan	Communist Party of India	288,000	51.12
M. Mahalingam	All India Anna Dravida Munnetra Kazhagam	272,059	48.29
A.P. Salvam	Independent	2,200	0.39
V.M. Emmanuel Ramaraj	Independent	1,141	0.20

== Aftermath ==
The CPI hailed the by-election as a victory for left and democratic forces. However, the CPI(M) state chief took a more cautious tone, stating that the by-election outcome "show that autocratic forces are still strong in Tamil Nadu". The head of the Pradesh Congress Committee (I) bitterly accused M.G. Ramachandran of not having supported the party candidate in Nagapattinam sufficiently.

K. Murugayian lost the Nagapattinam seat in the subsequent 1980 Lok Sabha election to the DMK candidate Thanzai M. Karunanidhi.
