= Selvaraj V. =

Member of Lok Sabha

Selvaraj V

Member of Parliament, Lok Sabha
- Incumbent
- Assumed office 4 June 2024
- Preceded by: M. Selvarasu
- Constituency: Nagapattinam

Personal details
- Party: Communist Party of India
- Occupation: Politician

Selvaraj V is an Indian politician and a member of the Lok Sabha from the Nagapattinam Lok Sabha constituency. He is a member of the Communist Party of India. In the 2024 general election of India, he defeated Sursith Sankar G of the All India Anna Dravida Munnetra Kazhagam by 208957 votes.

== See also ==
- Communist Party of India
- 2024 Indian general election
- Nagapattinam Lok Sabha constituency
