= Nagapattinam Lok Sabha constituency =

Parliamentary constituency in Tamil Nadu, India

Coordinates: 10.77°N 79.83°E

Nagapattinam
- Lok Sabha constituency
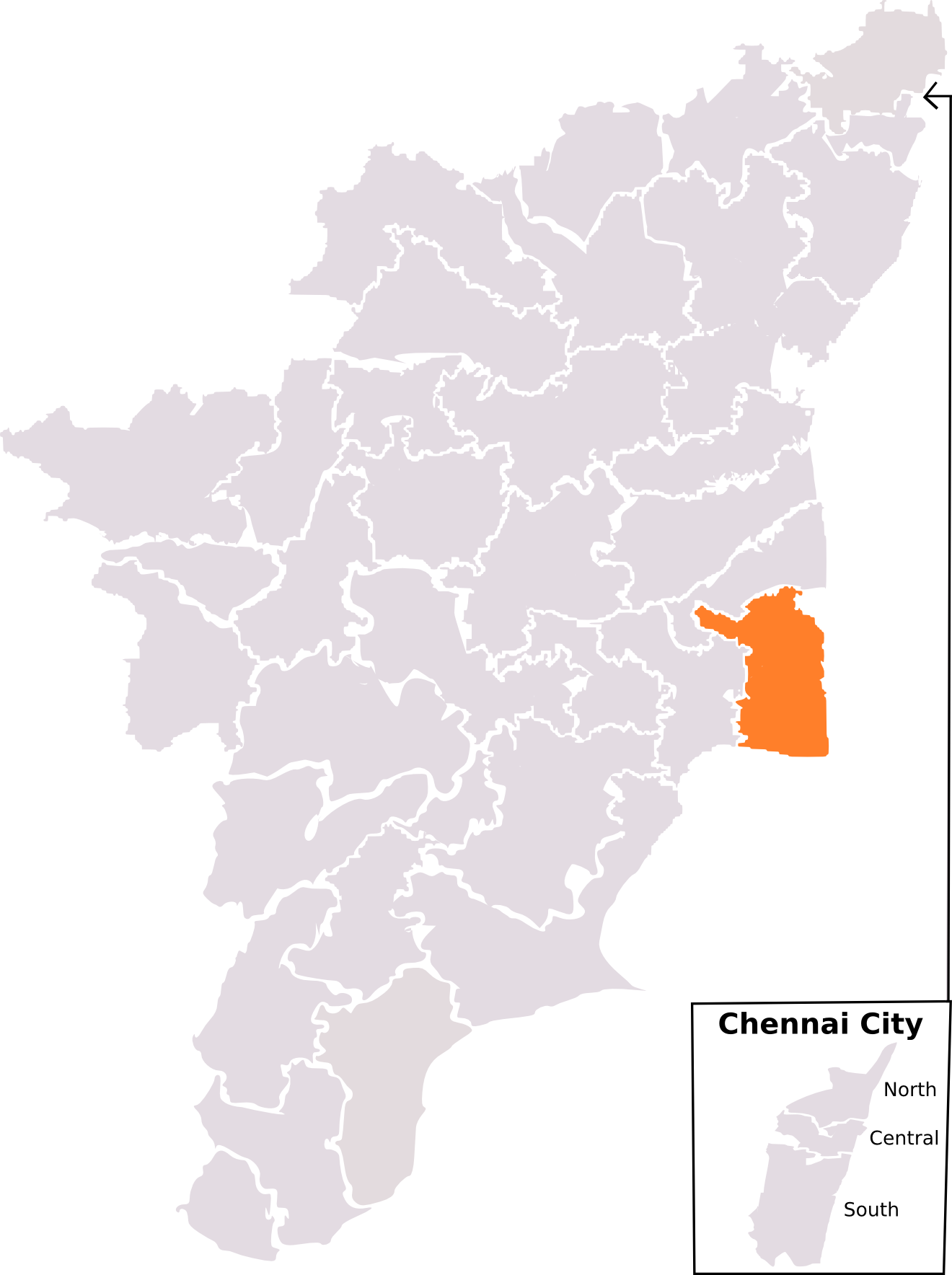
- Nagapattinam constituency, post-2008 delimitation

Constituency details
- Country: India
- Region: South India
- State: Tamil Nadu
- Assembly constituencies: Nagapattinam; Kilvelur; Vedaranyam; Thiruthuraipoondi; Thiruvarur; Nannilam
- Established: 1957-Present
- Total electors: 13,03,060
- Reservation: SC

Member of Parliament
- 18th Lok Sabha
- Incumbent Selvaraj V
- Party: CPI
- Alliance: INDIA
- Elected year: 2024
- Preceded by: M. Selvarasu

Nagapattinam is a Lok Sabha constituency in Tamil Nadu. Its Tamil Nadu Parliamentary Constituency number is 29 of 39. The seat is reserved for scheduled castes. The constituency is noted for being an historically communist stronghold, having elected Communist Party of India parliamentary representative seven times.

== Location ==
The constituency is at the tail end of the Cauvery delta. The area is prone to both floods and droughts. The Cauvery water crisis, affecting agriculture in the area, remains high on the agenda in Nagapattinam Lok Sabha constituency. Apart from farming, there is an oil refinery and some minor industrial units.

== Demography and dynamics ==
Scheduled Castes constitute about 32.95% of the population in the Nagapattinam Lok Sabha constituency.

Gender demographic of Nagapattinam Lok Sabha constituency as of 20.01.2021, taken during the elections in 2021.

Year	Female	Male	Transgender	Total
2021	6,58,437	6,82,815	53	13,41,305

== Assembly segments ==
=== From 2009 ===
The Nagapattinam Lok Sabha constituency is composed of six state assembly constituencies:

Constituency number	Name	Reserved for (SC/ST/None)	District	Party	2024 Lead
163	Nagapattinam	None	Nagapattinam	DMK	CPI
164	Kilvelur	SC	Nagapattinam	CPI(M)	CPI
165	Vedaranyam	None	Nagapattinam	AIADMK	CPI
166	Thiruthuraipoondi	SC	Tiruvarur	CPI	CPI
168	Tiruvarur	None	Tiruvarur	DMK	CPI
169	Nannilam	None	Tiruvarur	AIADMK	CPI

=== Before 2009 ===
The constituency was composed of:

1. Nannilam (SC)
2. Thiruvarur (SC)
3. Nagapattinam
4. Vedharanyam
5. Thiruthuraipoondi (SC)
6. Mannarkudi (moved to Thanjavur Constituency)

== Members of Parliament ==
Year	Winner	Party
1957	M. Ayyakannu	Indian National Congress
1957	K.R. Sambandam	Indian National Congress
1962	Gopalsamy Thenkondar	Indian National Congress
1967	V. Sambasivan	Indian National Congress
1971	M. Kathamuthu	Communist Party of India
1977	S. G. Murugaiyan	Communist Party of India
1979*	K. Murugaiyan	Communist Party of India
1980	Karunanithi Thazhai	Dravida Munnetra Kazhagam
1984	M. Mahalingam	All India Anna Dravida Munnetra Kazhagam
1989	M. Selvarasu	Communist Party of India
1991	Padma	Indian National Congress
1996	M. Selvarasu	Communist Party of India
1998	M. Selvarasu	Communist Party of India
1999	A.K.S. Vijayan	Dravida Munnetra Kazhagam
2004	A.K.S. Vijayan	Dravida Munnetra Kazhagam
2009	A.K.S. Vijayan	Dravida Munnetra Kazhagam
2014	K. Gopal	All India Anna Dravida Munnetra Kazhagam
2019	M. Selvarasu	Communist Party of India
2024	Selvaraj V	Communist Party of India

- Due to the death of S.G. Murugaiyan, a by-election was held.

== Election results ==
Vote share of Winning candidates
2024	47.79%
2019	52.40%
2014	46.86%
2009	48.58%
2004	61.67%
1999	49.92%
1998	58.77%
1996	56.77%
1991	49.71%
1989	49.32%
1984	49.91%
1980	50.98%
By-1979	51.12%
1977	53.95%
1971	54.95%
1967	41.78%
1962	45.98%
1957	26.95%

=== General Elections 2024 ===
2024 Indian general election: Nagappattinam
Party	Candidate	Votes	%	±%
CPI	Selvaraj V	465,044	47.79	−4.61
AIADMK	G. Surjeet Sankar	256,087	26.32	−4.90
BJP	S. G. M. Ramesh	102,173	10.50	New
NOTA	None of the above	8,918	0.92	−0.03
Margin of victory		208,957	21.47	+0.29
Turnout		973,011	71.94	−4.99
CPI hold		Swing		

=== General Elections 2019 ===
2019 Indian general election: Nagapattinam
Party	Candidate	Votes	%	±%
CPI	M. Selvarasu	522,892	52.40	+42.65
AIADMK	M. Saravanan	3,11,539	31.22	−15.64
Independent	T. Sengodi	70,307	7.05	
MNM	K. Guruviah	14,503	1.45	
NOTA	None of the above	9,463	0.95	−0.74
BSP	V. Anitha	5,412	0.54	
Margin of victory		2,11,353	21.18	9.73
Turnout		9,97,843	76.93	0.01
Registered electors		13,03,649		7.68
CPI gain from AIADMK		Swing	5.54	

=== General Elections 2014 ===
2014 Indian general election: Nagapattinam
Party	Candidate	Votes	%	±%
AIADMK	Dr. K. Gopal	434,174	46.86%	
DMK	A. K. S. Vijayan	3,28,095	35.41%	−13.17%
CPI	G. Palanisamy	90,313	9.75%	−32.54%
PMK	Vadivel Ravanan	43,506	4.70%	
INC	Thalai T. A. P. Senthilpandian	23,967	2.59%	
NOTA	None of the above	15,662	1.69%	
Margin of victory		1,06,079	11.45%	5.15%
Turnout		9,26,540	77.86%	−0.97%
Registered electors		12,10,626		23.24%
AIADMK gain from DMK		Swing	-1.72%	

=== General Elections 2009 ===
2009 Indian general election: Nagapattinam
Party	Candidate	Votes	%	±%
DMK	A. K. S. Vijayan	369,915	48.58%	−13.08%
CPI	M. Selvarasu	3,21,953	42.28%	
DMDK	M. Muthukumar	51,376	6.75%	
Independent	P. Veerasamy	8,769	1.15%	
BSP	G. Veeramuthu	5,123	0.67%	0.11%
Margin of victory		47,962	6.30%	−22.48%
Turnout		7,61,391	77.71%	5.87%
Registered electors		9,82,352		−6.35%
DMK hold		Swing	-13.08%	

=== General Elections 2004 ===
2004 Indian general election: Nagapattinam
Party	Candidate	Votes	%	±%
DMK	A. K. S. Vijayan	463,389	61.67%	11.74%
AIADMK	P. J. Archunan	2,47,166	32.89%	
JD(U)	S. G. M. Ramesh	17,090	2.27%	
Independent	K. Murugesan	9,480	1.26%	
BSP	A. Balaguru	4,207	0.56%	
Independent	T. Kumar	3,811	0.51%	
Margin of victory		2,16,223	28.77%	25.50%
Turnout		7,51,436	71.65%	5.61%
Registered electors		10,49,004		−0.54%
DMK hold		Swing	11.74%	

=== General Elections 1999 ===
1999 Indian general election: Nagapattinam
Party	Candidate	Votes	%	±%
DMK	A. K. S. Vijayan	342,237	49.92%	
CPI	M. Selvarasu	3,19,771	46.65%	−12.12%
PT	T. Nadaiyazhagan	22,346	3.26%	
Margin of victory		22,466	3.28%	−17.27%
Turnout		6,85,512	66.02%	−8.10%
Registered electors		10,54,666		3.29%
DMK gain from CPI		Swing	-6.85%	

=== General Elections 1998 ===
1998 Indian general election: Nagapattinam
Party	Candidate	Votes	%	±%
CPI	M. Selvarasu	375,589	58.77%	2.00%
AIADMK	Dr. K. Gopal	2,44,286	38.23%	
INC	M. Thiagarajan	15,837	2.48%	−22.43%
PT	G. Jeevanandam	3,354	0.52%	
Margin of victory		1,31,303	20.55%	−11.32%
Turnout		6,39,066	64.75%	−9.37%
Registered electors		10,21,037		3.97%
CPI hold		Swing	2.00%	

=== General Elections 1996 ===
1996 Indian general election: Nagapattinam
Party	Candidate	Votes	%	±%
CPI	M. Selvarasu	394,330	56.77%	10.97%
INC	M. Kannivannan	1,72,984	24.90%	−24.80%
CPI(M)	V. Thambusamy	1,08,069	15.56%	
BJP	S. Rajamani	16,582	2.39%	
Margin of victory		2,21,346	31.87%	27.96%
Turnout		6,94,577	74.12%	0.68%
Registered electors		9,82,040		6.48%
CPI gain from INC		Swing	7.07%	

=== General Elections 1991 ===
1991 Indian general election: Nagapattinam
Party	Candidate	Votes	%	±%
INC	Padma	327,413	49.71%	3.49%
CPI	M. Selvarasu	3,01,697	45.80%	−3.52%
PMK	U. Kasinathan	28,098	4.27%	0.58%
Margin of victory		25,716	3.90%	0.80%
Turnout		6,58,707	73.44%	−1.77%
Registered electors		9,22,262		−1.04%
INC gain from CPI		Swing	0.38%	

=== General Elections 1989 ===
1989 Indian general election: Nagapattinam
Party	Candidate	Votes	%	±%
CPI	M. Selvarasu	341,921	49.32%	−0.21%
INC	N. S. Veeramurasu	3,20,398	46.22%	
PMK	V. S. Thagaraju	25,516	3.68%	
Margin of victory		21,523	3.10%	2.73%
Turnout		6,93,243	75.22%	−7.06%
Registered electors		9,31,916		23.29%
CPI gain from AIADMK		Swing	-0.59%	

=== General Elections 1984 ===
1984 Indian general election: Nagapattinam
Party	Candidate	Votes	%	±%
AIADMK	M. Mahalingam	300,912	49.91%	
CPI	K. Murugaiyan	2,98,623	49.53%	0.51%
Independent	S. Arumugam	3,376	0.56%	
Margin of victory		2,289	0.38%	−1.57%
Turnout		6,02,911	82.27%	1.42%
Registered electors		7,55,903		10.46%
AIADMK gain from DMK		Swing	-1.07%	

=== General Elections 1980 ===
1980 Indian general election: Nagapattinam
Party	Candidate	Votes	%	±%
DMK	Thazhai Karunanithi	278,561	50.98%	4.93%
CPI	K. Murugaiyan	2,67,887	49.02%	−4.93%
Margin of victory		10,674	1.95%	−5.96%
Turnout		5,46,448	80.86%	1.89%
Registered electors		6,84,297		3.14%
DMK gain from CPI		Swing	-2.98%	

=== By-election 1979 ===
1979 By Election: Nagapattinam
Party	Candidate	Votes	%	±%
CPI	K. Murugaiyan	288,000	51.12%	−2.83%
AIADMK	M. Mahalingam	2,72,059	48.29%	New
Margin of victory		15,941	2.83%	▼25.44
Turnout				
Registered electors				
CPI hold		Swing		

=== General Elections 1977 ===
1977 Indian general election: Nagapattinam
Party	Candidate	Votes	%	±%
CPI	S. G. Murugaiyan	278,419	53.95%	−0.99%
DMK	Thazhai Karunanithi	2,37,609	46.05%	
Margin of victory		40,810	7.91%	−14.03%
Turnout		5,16,028	78.97%	−1.62%
Registered electors		6,63,463		28.27%
CPI hold		Swing	-0.99%	

=== General Elections 1971 ===
1971 Indian general election: Nagapattinam
Party	Candidate	Votes	%	±%
CPI	M. Kathamuthu	219,684	54.95%	35.65%
INC(O)	V. Sabasivam	1,31,957	33.00%	
CPI(M)	G. Bharathimohan	48,171	12.05%	−26.88%
Margin of victory		87,727	21.94%	19.09%
Turnout		3,99,812	80.59%	−4.10%
Registered electors		5,17,251		8.43%
CPI gain from INC		Swing	13.17%	

=== General Elections 1967 ===
1967 Indian general election: Nagapattinam
Party	Candidate	Votes	%	±%
INC	V. Sambasivam	164,167	41.78%	−4.20%
CPI(M)	V. P. Chintan	1,52,948	38.93%	
CPI	M. Kathamuthu	75,812	19.29%	−17.45%
Margin of victory		11,219	2.86%	−6.38%
Turnout		3,92,927	84.69%	4.00%
Registered electors		4,77,019		6.39%
INC hold		Swing	-4.20%	

=== General Elections 1962 ===
1962 Indian general election: Nagapattinam
Party	Candidate	Votes	%	±%
INC	Gopalsamy Thenkondar	161,421	45.98%	19.03%
CPI	C. Kandasamy Thevar	1,29,004	36.74%	20.54%
IUML	A. M. Mytheen Sayabu	56,412	16.07%	
Independent	Mohamed Cassim Rowther	4,252	1.21%	
Margin of victory		32,417	9.23%	5.45%
Turnout		3,51,089	80.68%	−28.80%
Registered electors		4,48,355		−47.57%
INC hold		Swing	19.03%	

=== General Elections 1957 ===
1957 Indian general election: Nagapattinam
Party	Candidate	Votes	%	±%
INC	K. R. Sambandam	252,275	26.95%	
INC	M. Ayyakkannu	216,890	23.17%	
CPI	A. K. Subbiah	1,51,704	16.20%	
CPI	P. Ramamoorthy	1,24,205	13.27%	
Independent	K. Manoharam	78,983	8.44%	
Independent	S. M. R. Arumugam Pillai	57,507	6.14%	
Independent	V. Veerasamy	54,597	5.83%	
Margin of victory		35,385	3.78%	
Turnout		9,36,161	109.48%	
Registered electors		8,55,083		
INC win (new seat)				

== Detailed election history ==
=== Double-seat constituency ===
Nagapattinam Lok Sabha constituency, then in the Madras State, was constituted for the 1957 Indian general election. In the 1957 election Nagapattinam elected two parliamentarians, one general seat and one seat reserved for Scheduled Castes. CPI fielded two prominent leaders, P. Ramamurthi and A.K. Subbiah, in Nagapattinam. Nevertheless, both seats were won by Indian National Congress candidates. For the Scheduled Caste seat M. Ayyakkannu of Congress obtained 216,890 votes (51.25%), A.K. Subbiah 151,704 votes (35.85%) and independent candidate V. Veeraswamy 54,597 votes (12.90%). For the general seat K.R. Sambandam of Congress obtained 252,275 votes (49.18%), P. Ramamurthi of CPI 124,205 votes (24.21%), independent candidate K. Manoharam 78,983 votes (15.40%) and independent candidate S.M.R. Arumugan Pillai 57,507 (11.21%).

=== 1960s ===
In the 1962 Indian general election Congress fielded Gopalsamy Thenkondar as its candidate in Nagapattinam. Thenkondar won the seat, obtaining 45.98% of the vote, defeating C. Kandasamy Thevar of CPI (36.74%), A.M. Mytheen Sayabu of the Muslim League (16.07%) and independent candidate Mohamed Cassim Rowther (1.21%).

After the 1964 split in the CPI, the break-away Communist Party of India (Marxist) emerged as the dominant communist faction in Nagapattinam taluk whilst CPI remained the larger party in the other taluks in the area. In 1964 CPI(M) formed the Tamil Nadu Tillers Association in Nagapattinam.

Congress had support from middle-class sectors and middle-caste farmers. The Swatantra Party had a presence in the area, based amongst Brahmin mirasdhars.

In the 1967 Indian general election three candidates contested the Nagapattinam seat. CPI(M) had fielded the prominent trade union leader V.P. Sinthan. CPI fielded M. Kathamuthu and Congress fielded V. Sambasivam. Together the CPI and CPI(M) candidates accounted for the majority of the votes, but the Congress candidate won. CPI argued that it had withdrawn its candidate in Coimbatore but that CPI(M) had not responded well to that gesture, and thus CPI insisted on fielding a candidate of its own in Nagapattinam. Notably Nagapattinam recorded the highest voter turnout nationwide with 84.69% in the 1967 election.

=== 1970s ===
In the 1971 Indian general election three candidates contested the Nagapattinam seat: the incumbent V. Sambasivan (now representing Congress(O)), M. Kathamuthu (CPI) and G. Bharatimohan (CPI(M)). M. Kathamuthu won the seat with 54.95% of the votes, with V. Sambasivan and G. Bharatimohan obtaining 33% and 12.05% respectively.

Ahead of the 1977 Indian general election CPI was allocated Nagapattinam as part of the Congress-AIADMK seat sharing alliance. For this election Nagapattinam had been identified as reserved for Scheduled Castes. There were only two candidates in the fray, S.G. Murugaiyan of CPI and Thazhai M. Karunanidhi of the Dravida Munnetra Kazhagam. S.G. Murugaiyan won the seat, obtaining 53.95% of the vote.

In January 1979 S.G. Murugaiyan was assassinated. CPI blamed 'AIADMK goondas' for the murder. A mass protest was held in Mannargudi after the killing, CPI claimed around a 100,000 people took part in the rally. A by-election was held in Nagapattinam, which was won by fellow CPI member K. Murugaiyan (supported by DMK and CPI(M)), who defeated the AIADMK candidate M. Mahalingam (supported by Congress).

=== 1980s ===
In the 1980 Indian general election two candidates contested the Nagapattinam seat: the incumbent K. Murugaiyan from CPI and Thazhai M. Karunanidhi from DMK. Thazai M. Karunanidhi won the seat, obtaining 50.98% of the votes.

The 1984 Indian general election saw K. Murugaiyan (CPI) and M. Mahalingam (AIADMK) face each other again. M. Mahalingam narrowly won the seat, obtaining 49.91% of the votes, with 49.53% going to K. Murugaiyan and 0.56% to independent candidate S. Arumugam.

Six candidates contested the Nagapattinam seat in the 1989 Indian general election, with the two main candidates being M. Selvarasu of CPI and N.S. Veeramurasu of Congress. The CPI candidate was supported by DMK whilst the Congress candidate was backed by AIADMK. M. Selvarasu won the seat with 49.32% against 46.22% for N.S. Veeramurasu. The victory in Nagapattinam was the sole successful contest for the DMK-led front in Tamil Nadu in 1989, against 38 seats won by the AIADMK-Congress combine.

In the 1991 Indian general election four candidates contested Nagapattinam: the winning Congress candidate Padma (49.71%), the defeated CPI incumbent M. Selvarasu (45.80%), Pattali Makkal Katchi candidate U. Kasinathan (4.27%) and independent candidate K. Ambikapathi (0.23%). Padma was the second woman to be elected to the Lok Sabha from the central districts of Tamil Nadu since Independence.

In the 1996 Indian general election, local issues dominated the campaigns in Nagapattinam. Amongst the 39 Lok Sabha constituencies in Tamil Nadu, Nagapattinam had the lowest number of candidates (6). In 1996 election Nagapattinam had the highest voter turnout percentage in Tamil Nadu at 74%. M. Selvarasu of CPI regained the seat with 56.77% of the votes. The runner-up was M. Kannivannan of Congress (24.90%), followed by V. Thambusamy of CPI(M) (15.56%), S. Rajamani of the Bharatiya Janata Party (2.39%) and two independents.

In 1998 election Nagapattinam was the sole seat allocated to CPI in the DMK-led alliance in Tamil Nadu. Four candidates contested the election. M. Selvarasu of CPI retained the seat, obtaining 58.77% of the votes. The main runner-up was Dr. K. Gopal of AIADMK, a medical doctor and Nannilam state legislator 1991–1996. K. Gopal got 38.23% of the votes, Congress candidate M. Thiagaranjan 2.48% and PT candidate G. Jeevanadam 0.52%.

CPI lost the seat in the 1999 Indian general election, by a margin of 22,466 votes. The outcome was unexpected, as the CPI historically had strong support in the area and the backing of AIADMK in this election. Nagapattinam had elected a CPI parliamentarian in 1989 and 1998, when the state-wide trend had been negative for CPI. DMK candidate A.K.S. Vijayan won the seat with 49.92% of the votes, followed by M. Selvarasu with 46.65%, PT candidate T. Nadaiyazhagan with 3.26% and independent candidate Durai Balaguru with 0.17%. A.K.S. Vijayan is the son of CPI leader A.K. Subbiah.

=== 2000s ===
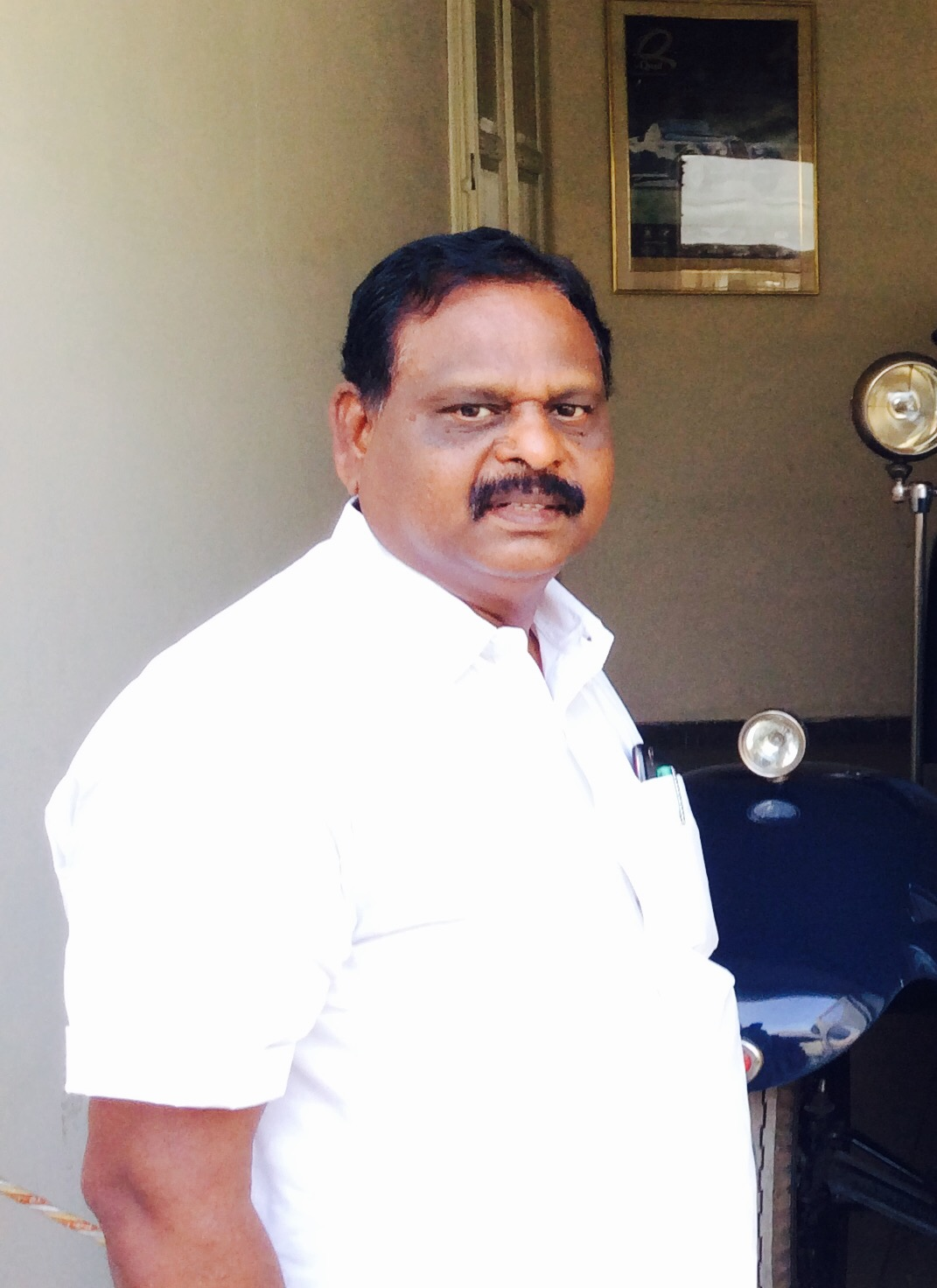
Dr. K. Gopal, elected Member of Parliament in 2014

In the 2004 Indian general election campaign, water shortages were a major concern in Nagapattinam. By the time, the area had experienced drought since 2001, with ground water levels decreasing. CPI supported DMK candidate A.K.S. Vijayan, the Nagapattinam District Secretary of DMK. A.K.S. Vijayan retained the seat, defeating the AIADMK candidate P.J. Archunan, Janata Dal (United) candidate S.G.M. Ramesh and eight others.

On 10 August 2007 the Delimitation Commission issued an order, retaining Nagapattinam as a constituency reserved for Scheduled Castes. Initial drafts for delimitation had the Nagapattinam Lok Sabha constituency abolished, but in the final decision the constituency remained. After delimitation the communist influence in Nagapattinam decreased, as the Mannargudi segment (with strong CPI and AIADMK influences) was removed from the Nagapattinam Lok Sabha constituency.

In the 2009 Indian general election Nagapattinam again had the lowest number of candidates in Tamil Nadu (7). Apart from the water crisis, two key concerns in the constituency were price rises and insufficiencies in electric power supply. A.K.S. Vijayan of DMK retained the seat with 48.48% of the votes, followed by M. Selvarasu of CPI with 42.20% and M. Muthukumar of DMDK with 6.73%.

Nine candidates contested the Nagapattinam seat in the 2014 Indian general election. CPI contested the Nagapattinam seat without support from neither AIADMK nor DMK for the first time since 1962. Nagapattinam the sole seat in central Tamil Nadu contested by CPI. The party nominated G. Palanisamy, four-time state legislator of Thiruthuraipoondi assembly constituency. His main contenders were Dr. K. Gopal of AIADMK and A.K.S. Vijayan from DMK. Dr. K. Gopal won the seat with 46.06%, followed by 34.81% for A.K.S. Vijayan. Whilst the performance of CPI and CPI(M) candidates in Tamil Nadu in 2014 was generally far below expectations of the left parties, G. Palanisamy managed to come in third place in Nagapattinam with votes in double digits (9.58%).

== See also ==
- Nagapatnam
- List of constituencies of the Lok Sabha
