= Kottoor =

Ancient chapel near Kolenchery, India

Coordinates: 9.97°N 76.4722°E

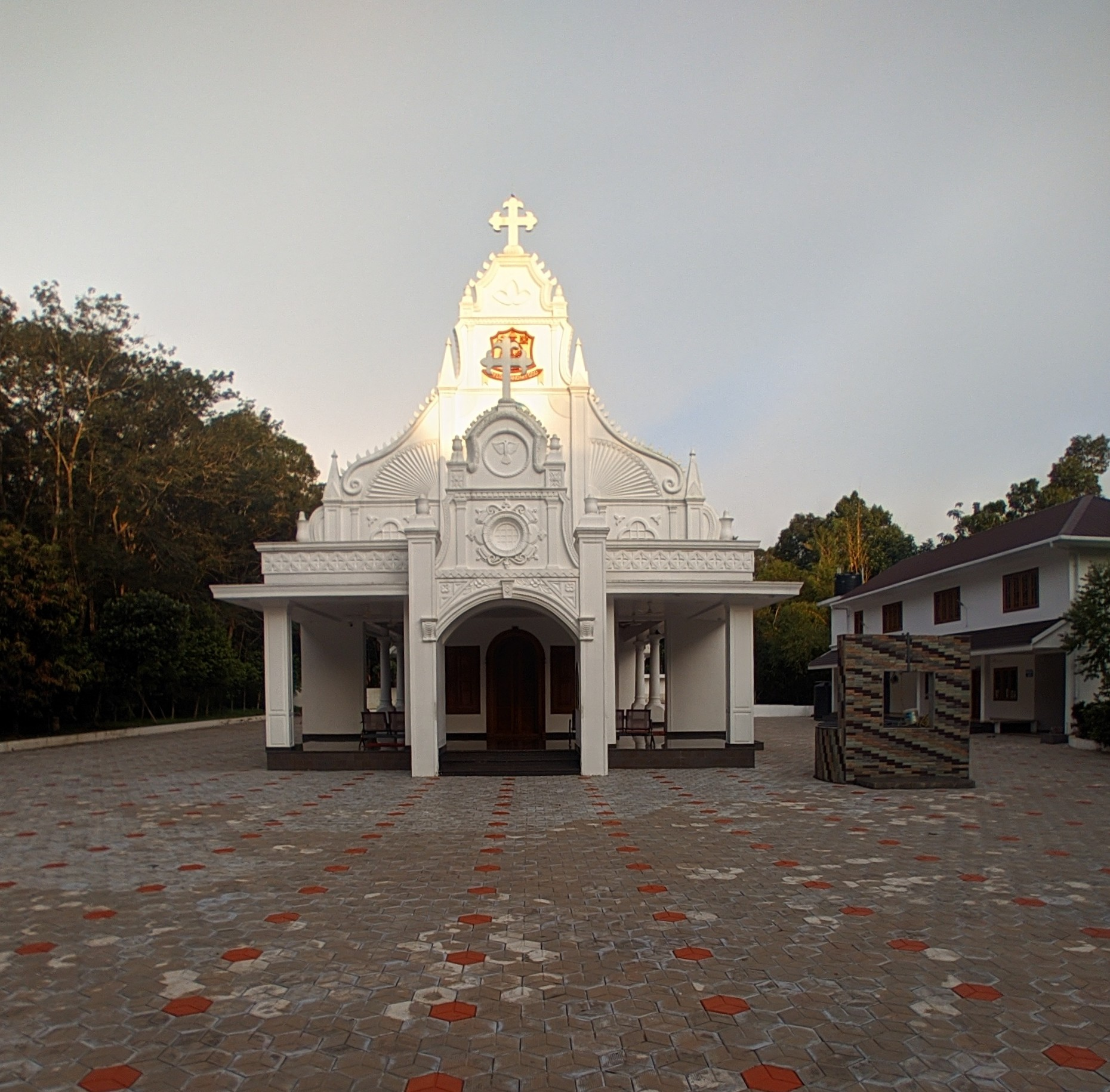
- Kottoor Church
- Primate: Catholicos of the East
- Headquarters: Kottayam, Kerala
- Territory: India
- Founder: Kottoor family 5th century
- Independence: Under Kolenchery Church, St Peter's and St Paul's Orthodox Church,
- Recognition: Oriental Orthodox

Kottoor Church or Kottoor St. George Orthodox Syrian Church is a chapel of Kolenchery Church. It is 0.5 km south of Kolenchery town, towards Karukappilly road and Muvattupuzha river.
