= K. Ulaganathan =

Indian politician

K. Ulaganathan is an Indian politician and former Member of the Tamil Nadu Legislative Assembly from the Tiruthuraipundi constituency from 2006 to 2016. He represents the Communist Party of India party.
