= K. R. Sambandam =

Indian landlord and politician

Kidangal R Sambandam, usually referred to as K.R.S was a landlord and prominent politician from Tamil Nadu, India. He has been elected as a Member of Parliament from the constituency of Nagapattinam belonging to Indian National Congress. He is a founder of Sambandam Higher Secondary School at Sembanarkoil, Mayiladuthurai. Sambandam Higher Secondary School is located around 17 km from its district headquarters Mayiladuthurai. His school is a government-aided school providing education for village boys and girls in and around Sembanarkoil.

His residency is located at Poonthalai which is near to Thalaichangadu. His residence is situated around 19 km away from Mayiladuthurai.

He died a few decades ago.
