= Kottur, Theni =

Kottur, Theni Kottur, Theni District
- Village
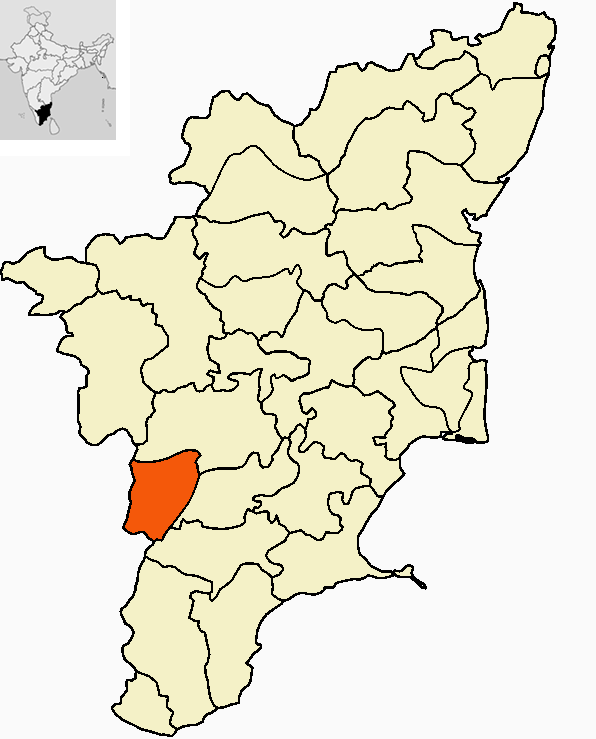
- Coordinates: 10°04′N 77°45′E

Population (2011)
  - Total: 6,000

Languages
  - Official: Tamil
- Postal code: 626534
- Vehicle registration: TN-60

Kottur, Theni District is a village of Tamil Nadu state in South India.
