= Thiruthuraipoondi Assembly constituency =

One of the 234 State Legislative Assembly Constituencies in Tamil Nadu, in India

Coordinates: 10.53°N 79.64°E

Thiruthuraipoondi
- Constituency No. 166 for the Tamil Nadu Legislative Assembly

Constituency details
- Country: India
- Region: South India
- State: Tamil Nadu
- District: Tiruvarur
- Lok Sabha constituency: Nagapattinam
- Established: 1957
- Total electors: 2,26,940
- Reservation: SC

Member of Legislative Assembly
- 17th Tamil Nadu Legislative Assembly
- Incumbent K. Marimuthu
- Party: CPI
- Alliance: LF
- Elected year: 2026

Thiruthuraipundi is a state assembly constituency in Thiruvarur district of Tamil Nadu, which includes Thiruthuraipoondi. It is reserved for members of the Scheduled Castes. The constituency has been in existence since the 1957 election. Communist party members from the Thiruthuraipoondi area played a vital role in the abolition of "agricultural bond labours" (pannayal ozhipu) in delta districts. The act was enacted after their continuous struggle. The constituency comprises Kottur, Thiruthuraipoondi and Muthupettai panchayat unions. It is one of the 234 State Legislative Assembly Constituencies in Tamil Nadu, in India.

== Members of Legislative Assembly ==
=== Madras State ===
Election	Name	Party
1957	A. Vedarathnam and V. Vedayyan	Indian National Congress
1962	A. K. Subbiah	Communist Party of India
1967	N. Dharmalingam	Dravida Munnetra Kazhagam

=== Tamil Nadu ===
Election	Name	Party
1971	C. Manali Kandasami	Communist Party of India
1977	P. Uthirapathy	Communist Party of India
1980	P. Uthirapathy	Communist Party of India (Marxist)
1984	P. Uthirapathy	Communist Party of India
1989	G. Palanisamy	Communist Party of India
1991	G. Palanisamy	Communist Party of India
1996	G. Palanisamy	Communist Party of India
2001	G. Palanisamy	Communist Party of India
2006	K. Ulaganathan	Communist Party of India
2011	K. Ulaganathan	Communist Party of India
2016	P. Adalarasan	Dravida Munnetra Kazhagam
2021	K. Marimuthu	Communist Party of India
2026	K. Marimuthu	Communist Party of India

== Election results ==
Vote share of winning candidates
2026	38.77%
2021	52.60%
2016	41.07%
2011	53.36%
2006	54.68%
2001	56.76%
1996	63.39%
1991	53.58%
1989	43.32%
1984	54.44%
1980	61.20%
1977	45.93%
1971	62.84%
1967	38.04%
1962	56.28%
1957	24.47%

=== 2026 ===
2026 Tamil Nadu Legislative Assembly election: Thiruthuraipoondi
Party	Candidate	Votes	%	±%
CPI	K. Marimuthu	74,062	38.77	▼13.83
TVK	S. Pandiyan	61,140	32.01	New
AIADMK	U. Balathandayutham	43,073	22.55	▼13.76
NTK	R. Vinothini	10,176	5.33	▼2.99
NOTA	NOTA	797	0.42	▼0.29
Margin of victory		12,922	6.76	▼9.53
Turnout		1,91,030	84.18	▲7.30
Registered electors		2,26,940		▼13,132
CPI hold		Swing	▼13.83	

=== 2021 ===
2021 Tamil Nadu Legislative Assembly election: Thiruthuraipoondi
Party	Candidate	Votes	%	±%
CPI	K. Marimuthu	97,092	52.60	+33.79
AIADMK	C. Suresh Kumar	67,024	36.31	+2.79
NTK	A. Aarthi	15,362	8.32	+7.27
AMMK	S. Rajanikanth	3,555	1.93	New
NOTA	NOTA	1,313	0.71	−0.3
Margin of victory		30,068	16.29	8.75
Turnout		184,573	76.88	−1.90
Rejected ballots		149	0.08	
Registered electors		240,072		
CPI gain from DMK		Swing	11.53	

=== 2016 ===
2016 Tamil Nadu Legislative Assembly election: Thiruthuraipoondi
Party	Candidate	Votes	%	±%
DMK	P. Adalarasan	72,127	41.07	New
AIADMK	K. Umamaheswari	58,877	33.53	New
CPI	K. Ulaganathan	33,038	18.81	−34.55
BJP	G. Udayakumar	3,937	2.24	+0.31
PMK	S. Rajamohan	2,005	1.14	New
NTK	J. S. Saravanakumar	1,844	1.05	New
NOTA	NOTA	1,768	1.01	New
Margin of victory		13,250	7.54	−6.71
Turnout		175,620	78.78	−1.85
Registered electors		222,916		
DMK gain from CPI		Swing	-12.29	

=== 2011 ===
2011 Tamil Nadu Legislative Assembly election: Thiruthuraipoondi
Party	Candidate	Votes	%	±%
CPI	K. Ulaganathan	83,399	53.36	−1.32
INC	P. Selvadurai	61,112	39.10	New
BJP	P. Sivashanmugam	3,025	1.94	+0.09
Independent	S. Rajkumar	1,981	1.27	New
Loktantrik Samajwadi	S. Saravanan	1,857	1.19	New
Independent	C. Singaperumal	1,726	1.10	New
BSP	Thai. Kandasamy	1,070	0.68	New
Independent	U. Ramachandran	898	0.57	New
Margin of victory		22,287	14.26	−2.21
Turnout		156,294	80.63	4.45
Registered electors		193,844		
CPI hold		Swing	-1.32	

=== 2006 ===
2006 Tamil Nadu Legislative Assembly election: Thiruthuraipoondi
Party	Candidate	Votes	%	±%
CPI	K. Ulaganathan	75,371	54.68	−2.08
AIADMK	A. Umadevi	52,665	38.21	New
DMDK	K. Mohan Kumar	5,918	4.29	New
BJP	P. Shivashanmugam	2,546	1.85	New
NCP	M. Jayakumar	844	0.61	New
Margin of victory		22,706	16.47	−2.89
Turnout		137,841	76.18	5.18
Registered electors		180,937		
CPI hold		Swing	-2.08	

=== 2001 ===
2001 Tamil Nadu Legislative Assembly election: Thiruthuraipoondi
Party	Candidate	Votes	%	±%
CPI	G. Palanisamy	73,451	56.76	−6.64
DMK	M. Poonguzhali	48,392	37.39	New
MDMK	C. Veeramani	4,959	3.83	New
Independent	N. Anbalagan	2,614	2.02	New
Margin of victory		25,059	19.36	−23.66
Turnout		129,416	71.00	−3.37
Registered electors		182,303		
CPI hold		Swing	-6.64	

=== 1996 ===
1996 Tamil Nadu Legislative Assembly election: Thiruthuraipoondi
Party	Candidate	Votes	%	±%
CPI	G. Palanisamy	79,103	63.39	+9.81
INC	K. Gopalsami	25,415	20.37	−22.93
CPI(M)	P. N. Thangarasu	19,336	15.50	New
ATMK	S. Saravanan	727	0.58	New
Margin of victory		53,688	43.02	32.74
Turnout		124,786	74.37	0.43
Registered electors		172,586		
CPI hold		Swing	9.81	

=== 1991 ===
1991 Tamil Nadu Legislative Assembly election: Thiruthuraipoondi
Party	Candidate	Votes	%	±%
CPI	G. Palanisamy	62,863	53.58	+10.26
INC	V. Vedaiyan	50,797	43.30	+28.25
PMK	M. Baskar	2,998	2.56	New
Margin of victory		12,066	10.28	3.11
Turnout		117,327	73.93	−5.50
Registered electors		161,577		
CPI hold		Swing	10.26	

=== 1989 ===
1989 Tamil Nadu Legislative Assembly election: Thiruthuraipoondi
Party	Candidate	Votes	%	±%
CPI	G. Palanisamy	49,982	43.32	−11.12
DMK	N. Kuppusamy	41,704	36.15	New
INC	T. Dakshina Moorthi	17,363	15.05	New
AIADMK	J. Archunan	5,980	5.18	−39.41
Margin of victory		8,278	7.17	−2.66
Turnout		115,379	79.43	−3.90
Registered electors		147,593		
CPI hold		Swing	-11.12	

=== 1984 ===
1984 Tamil Nadu Legislative Assembly election: Thiruthuraipoondi
Party	Candidate	Votes	%	±%
CPI	P. Uthirapathy	59,834	54.44	New
AIADMK	J. Archunan	49,019	44.60	New
Independent	K. Ambikapathi	1,065	0.97	New
Margin of victory		10,815	9.84	−12.55
Turnout		109,918	83.33	3.24
Registered electors		134,745		
CPI gain from CPI(M)		Swing	-6.76	

=== 1980 ===
1980 Tamil Nadu Legislative Assembly election: Thiruthuraipoondi
Party	Candidate	Votes	%	±%
CPI(M)	P. Uthirapathy	62,051	61.20	New
INC	V. Vedaiyan	39,345	38.80	New
Margin of victory		22,706	22.39	2.97
Turnout		101,396	80.09	2.18
Registered electors		127,669		
CPI(M) gain from CPI		Swing	15.27	

=== 1977 ===
1977 Tamil Nadu Legislative Assembly election: Thiruthuraipoondi
Party	Candidate	Votes	%	±%
CPI	P. Uthirapathy	43,208	45.93	−16.91
DMK	N. Kuppusamy	24,934	26.50	New
Independent	M. P. Kannusamy	19,721	20.96	New
JP	T. Rajamanickam	6,216	6.61	New
Margin of victory		18,274	19.42	−9.28
Turnout		94,079	77.91	−3.49
Registered electors		121,892		
CPI hold		Swing	-16.91	

=== 1971 ===
1971 Tamil Nadu Legislative Assembly election: Thiruthuraipoondi
Party	Candidate	Votes	%	±%
CPI	C. Manali Kandasami	40,714	62.84	+27.21
INC	G. Thayamanavang	22,118	34.14	+7.81
Independent	V. Pandian	1,960	3.03	New
Margin of victory		18,596	28.70	26.29
Turnout		64,792	81.41	−5.10
Registered electors		81,504		
CPI gain from DMK		Swing	24.80	

=== 1967 ===
1967 Madras Legislative Assembly election: Thiruthuraipoondi
Party	Candidate	Votes	%	±%
DMK	N. Dharumalingam	23,728	38.04	New
CPI	K. C. Manali	22,226	35.63	−20.64
INC	S. R. Pillai	16,424	26.33	−17.39
Margin of victory		1,502	2.41	−10.14
Turnout		62,378	86.51	1.08
Registered electors		74,871		
DMK gain from CPI		Swing	-18.24	

=== 1962 ===
1962 Madras Legislative Assembly election: Thiruthuraipoondi
Party	Candidate	Votes	%	±%
CPI	A. K. Subbaiah	45,148	56.28	+36.09
INC	V. Vedaiyan	35,078	43.72	+19.26
Margin of victory		10,070	12.55	11.25
Turnout		80,226	85.44	−39.79
Registered electors		97,640		
CPI gain from INC		Swing	31.81	

=== 1957 ===
1957 Madras Legislative Assembly election: Thiruthuraipoondi
Party	Candidate	Votes	%	±%
INC	V. Vedaiyan (Sc)	54,049	24.47	New
INC	A. Vedaratnam	51,168	23.16	New
CPI	C. Kandasamy	44,593	20.19	New
CPI	S. Vadivelu (Sc)	40,418	18.30	New
Independent	N. Dharmalinga Thevar	16,527	7.48	New
Independent	M. Ambikapathi (Sc)	14,161	6.41	New
Margin of victory		2,881	1.30	
Turnout		220,916	125.23	
Registered electors		176,410		
INC win (new seat)				
