= M. Kathamuthu =

Indian politician

Manickam Kathamuthu (17 April 1918 – 26 February 1991) was an Indian communist politician.

== Biography ==
Kathamuthu was born on 17 April 1918. He was the son of Manickam. Kathamuthu obtained a M.A. degree. He was married to Kanniammal and had three sons and two daughters. Before becoming a CPI leader he was linked to the Indian National Congress. He served as Vice President of the South Indian Railway Labour Union between 1942 and 1944.

Between 1951 and 1964 Kathamuthu served as member of the Thanjavoor District Committee of CPI as well as the a member of the Executive Committee of the Thanjavoor District Kisan Sabha. He served as Assistant Secretary of the Tamil Nadu Kisan Sabha between 1954 and 1960. Between 1964 and 1970 he was a member of the Central Kisan Council of the All India Kisan Sabha. In 1968 he became a member of the National Council of CPI. He served as editor of the fortnightly publication Uzhavuchelvam.

CPI fielded Kathamuthu as its candidate in the Nagapattinam seat in the 1967 Indian general election. He finished in third place with 75,812 votes (19.29%). He won the Nagapattinam seat in the 1971 Indian general election, obtaining 219,684 votes (54.95%).

As of 1974 Kathamuthu served as the president of the Bharatiya Khet Mazdoor Union. He had been a founder of the Thanvajoor District branch of the union. Kathamuthu had also been associated with unions amongst Post & Telecommunications and Municipal workers.

Kathamuthu died on 26 February 1991.
