= G. Murugaiyan =

Indian politician

Member, Tamil Nadu Legislative Assembly
- In office 1967–1971
- Preceded by: Palani
- Succeeded by: G. Elangovan
- Constituency: Tiruvaiyaru

Personal details
- Born: 22 June 1925
- Party: DMK
- Profession: Educationalist

G. Murugaiyan was an Indian politician and a former member of the Tamil Nadu Legislative Assembly. He hailed from the Rajagiri region of the Thanjavur district. He studied at Rajagiri Primary School and Government College, Thiruvaiyaru. Belonging to the Dravida Munnetra Kazhagam (DMK) party, he contested and won the 1967 Tamil Nadu Legislative Assembly election from the Thiruvaiyaru constituency, becoming a Member of the Legislative Assembly.

== Electoral performance ==
=== 1967 ===
1967 Madras Legislative Assembly election: Tiruvaiyaru
| Party | Candidate | Votes | % | ±% |
|---|---|---|---|---|
| DMK | G. Murugaiyan | 37,693 | 51.94% | +12.87 |
| INC | K. B. Palani | 34,165 | 47.08% | −6.69 |
| Independent | R. Thangaiyan | 713 | 0.98% | New |
| Margin of victory | | 3,528 | 4.86% | −9.84% |
| Turnout | | 72,571 | 82.37% | 8.23% |
| Registered electors | | 91,028 | | |
| DMK gain from INC | | Swing | -1.83% | |
