= K. Marimuthu =

Indian politician

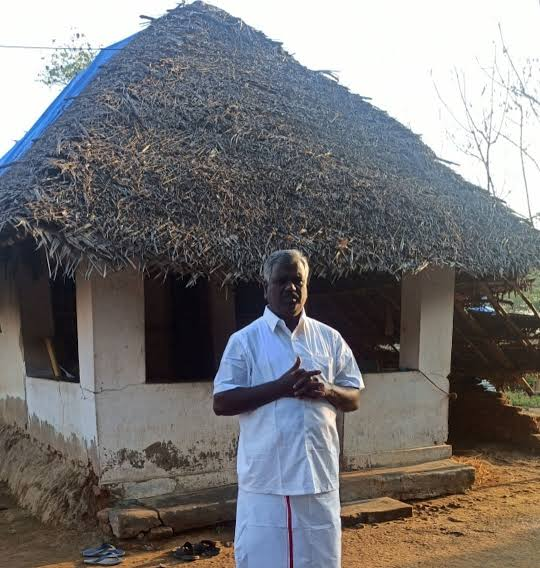
- Marimuthu in front of his house

Member of Tamil Nadu Legislative Assembly
- Incumbent
- Assumed office 7 May 2021
- Preceded by: P. Adalarasan
- Constituency: Thiruthuraipoondi constituency

Personal details
- Born: 1973 (age 52–53)
- Party: Communist Party of India (1994 - present)
- Spouse: Jayasudha
- Children: 2
- Occupation: Politician; Social worker

K. Marimuthu is an Indian politician and Member of the 16th Tamil Nadu Assembly from the Thiruthuraipoondi constituency. He was a commerce graduate who joined politics in 1994.

== Early life ==
Marimuthu, who was born into a family of poor agricultural labourers belonging to a Scheduled Caste, makes light of his economic condition. Marimuthu says

“Politics is my life, and I have no other vocation. My wife is into agriculture, and we cultivate land taken on lease. We get by with whatever we have,”

== Personal life ==
Marimuthu lives in a thatched house in Kaduvakudi, has spent over half his life as a full-time party worker fighting for public causes. His wife, Jayasudha, is an agricultural labourer.

== Politics and activism ==
Marimuthu joined the CPI in 1994. He was drawn by the work done by the party for ordinary people as he was “one among them”. He stated that “Serving the masses is my only aim; reflecting the aspirations of the downtrodden is my politics.” Currently he serves as Member of the 16th Tamil Nadu Assembly from the Thiruthuraipoondi constituency.

== Philanthropy ==
When Cyclone Gaja blew his hut, Marimuthu who obtained Rs 50,000 through a NGO to mend it, gave the entire sum to another person in the village who was ineligible for compensation as he did not have a patta and helped him repair the hut.

== Elections contested ==
Election	Constituency	Party	Result	Vote %	Runner-up	Runner-up Party	Runner-up vote %
2026 Tamil Nadu Legislative Assembly election	Thiruthuraipoondi	CPI	Won	52.23%	C.Suresh Kumar	AIADMK	36.06%
