= Sithamalli =

- village
- Location within Tamil Nadu Location within India
- Coordinates: 10.46°N 79.50°E
- Country: India
- State: Tamil Nadu
- District: Tiruvarur
- Time zone: UTC+5:30 (IST)
- PIN: 614705
- Vehicle registration: TN 50

Sithamalli is a village of Mannargudi Taluk in Tiruvarur district Tamil Nadu, India. Muthupet is a nearby town.
