= Kottur, Tamil Nadu Assembly constituency =

Coordinates: 10.61°N 79.56°E

Kottur
- Former constituency for the Tamil Nadu Legislative Assembly

Constituency details
- Country: India
- Region: South India
- State: Tamil Nadu
- District: Tiruvarur
- Established: 1967
- Abolished: 1971
- Total electors: 84,002

Kottur was former state assembly constituency in Tiruvarur district, Tamil Nadu, India. It existed from 1967 to 1971.

== Members of the Legislative Assembly ==
Year	Winner	Party
Fourth	A. K. Subbiah	Communist Party of India
Fifth	A. K. Subbiah	Communist Party of India

== Election results ==
Vote share of winning candidates
1971	73.26%
1967	42.47%

=== 1971 ===
1971 Tamil Nadu Legislative Assembly election: Kottur
Party	Candidate	Votes	%	±%
CPI	A. K. Subbaih	47,419	73.26%	
INC	T. Rajamanickam	17,309	26.74%	−7.39%
Margin of victory		30,110	46.52%	38.18%
Turnout		64,728	80.46%	−6.84%
Registered electors		84,002		
CPI hold		Swing	30.79%	

=== 1967 ===
1967 Madras Legislative Assembly election: Kottur
Party	Candidate	Votes	%	±%
CPI	A. K. Subbaih	28,156	42.47%	
INC	C. M. Ambikapathy	22,627	34.13%	
CPI(M)	A. K. Ganesan	15,515	23.40%	
Margin of victory		5,529	8.34%	
Turnout		66,298	87.30%	
Registered electors		78,024		
CPI win (new seat)				
