= T. Latha =

Indian politician (born 1980)

Thangamani Latha (born 1980) is an Indian politician from Tamil Nadu. She is a member of the Tamil Nadu Legislative Assembly from Kilvelur Assembly constituency in Nagapattinam district representing the Communist Party of India (Marxist) which contested the elections in alliance with DMK.

== Early life ==
Latha was born in Keezha Vazhakkarai village, Nagapattinam district, Tamil Nadu. She married Thangamani, who is an active CPI member a full time worker of CITU, the party's trade union wing. She studied at Government High School, Kilukuddy, and passed Class 10 in 1994. Later, she discontinued her studies. She declared assets worth Rs.58 lakhs in her affidavit to the Election Commission of India.

== Career ==
Latha began her political career as a student leader served as Union secretary with All India Democratic Women’s Association (AIDWA) in early 2002. She is now the State Vice Secretary of AIDWA as of May 2026. In the 2026 Tamil Nadu Legislative Assembly election, she won the Kilvelur Assembly constituency representing the CPI (M). She polled 56,108 votes and defeated her nearest rival, P. Senthil Pandian of the Tamilaga Vettri Kazhagam, by a margin of 2,278 votes.
