= K. Murugaiyan =

Indian politician

Member of the Indian Parliament for Nagapattinam
- In office 1979–1980
- Preceded by: S.G. Murugaiyan
- Succeeded by: Thazai M. Karunanidhi

Personal details
- Party: Communist Party of India

K. Murugaiyan is an Indian politician, belonging to the Communist Party of India (CPI). He was a bonded labourer.

K. Murugaiyan was elected to the Lok Sabha (lower house of the Parliament of India) from the Nagapattinam seat a June 1979 by-election. The by-election had been called after the murder of the incumbent CPI parliamentarian S.G. Murugaiyan.

K. Murugaiyan lost the Nagapattinam seat in the 1980 Indian general election. He finished in second place with 49.02% of the votes. He was close to regaining the seat in the 1984 Indian general election, finishing in second place with 49.53% of the votes.

== Elections contested ==
=== Lok Sabha Elections ===
| Elections | Constituency | Party | Result | Vote percentage | Opposition Candidate | Opposition Party | Opposition vote percentage |
|---|---|---|---|---|---|---|---|
| 1979 By-Election | Nagapattinam | CPI | Won | 51.12 | M. Mahalingam | AIADMK | 48.29 |
| 1980 Indian general election | Nagapattinam | CPI | Lost | 49.02 | Thazhai Karunanithi | DMK | 50.98 |
| 1984 Indian general election | Nagapattinam | CPI | Lost | 49.53 | M. Mahalingam | AIADMK | 49.91 |
