= Kottur block =

Kottur block is a revenue block in Tiruvarur district, Tamil Nadu, India. It has a total of 49 panchayat villages.
