= Thanjavur Medical College =

Medical college in Tamil Nadu, India

Coordinates: 10.759141°N 79.106574°E

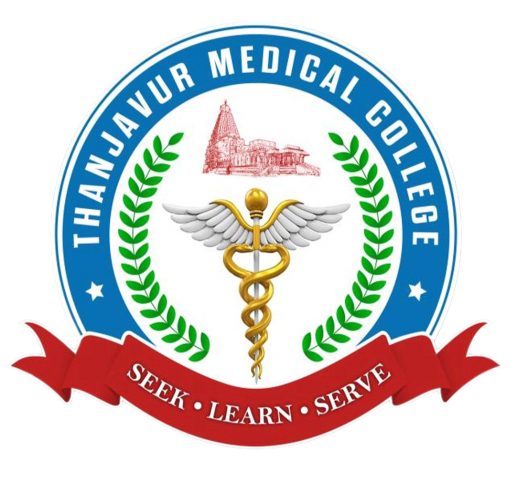
- Type: Medical college and hospital
- Established: 1958; 68 years ago
- Affiliations: The Tamil Nadu Dr. M.G.R. Medical University
- Dean: Dr. R. Balajinathan
- Location: Thanjavur, India
- Website: tmctnj.in

Thanjavur Medical College (TMC) is a medical college in Tamil Nadu, India. It is located in Thanjavur, Tamil Nadu and is affiliated with the Tamil Nadu Dr. M.G.R. Medical University, Chennai. It is one of the oldest medical colleges in Tamil Nadu. It caters to the medical needs of districts of Thanjavur, Ariyalur, Nagapattinam, Tiruvarur, Perambalur, and Pudukkottai. It is established & operated by Government of Tamil Nadu through the Tamil Nadu Directorate of Medical Education.

== History ==
The foundation stone for the medical college building was laid in 1958 by Dr. Rajendra Prasad, the then-president of India. It was first intended to be started at the Raja Mirasdars Hospital premises. Later, at the behest of Kamarajar, the Chief Minister of Madras, and as requested by M.L.A. Parisutha Nadar, it was shifted to the present Medical College premises. The land was gifted earlier by Yagappa Nadar, H/O Arulanda Ammal family, through the Rotary Club of Thanjavur. The deposit money for the college was arranged from the Tanjore District Board Railway Cess Fund.

Starting with 650 beds in the 1960s, the college has emerged as an institution of higher learning in medicine and research with a bed strength of 3000. Thanjavur Medical College Hospital is a referral teaching hospital. Proposals for starting a trauma care hospital and a cancer hospital are pending with the government.

The initial intake for the undergraduate courses was a mere 75 boys and 25 girls, which has today risen to 150, with the number of girls outnumbering the boys. All the departments have postgraduate degrees and diploma courses.

== Hospital ==
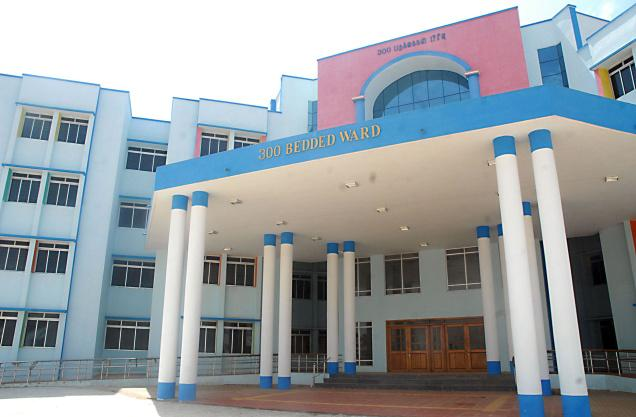
The New Hospital Building at TMC

The Thanjavur Medical College Hospital (TMCH) and the Raja Mirasdar Hospital are affiliated to the college. These hospitals are among the top-notch hospitals in Thanjavur. They are known to provide medical and therapeutic services. In the year 2006-07, about 5,864 major and 3,747 minor surgeries took place in Thanjavur Medical College. The Raja Mirasdar Hospital witnessed about 38,065 surgeries in 2006-07. Trauma cases account for 90 percent of the inpatient admissions daily in the hospital. This is a hospital. The medical college campus covers an area of 1 km^{2}. It is located on the western edge of Thanjavur city. The Thanjavur Medical College Hospital is situated on the southern edge of the campus.

A new hospital complex at Thanjavur Medical College campus started functioning from the first week of June 2010. Constructed for ₹38 crore, the buildings include a 300-bed hospital, provisions for the functioning of all specialty departments, out-patient ward, laboratory buildings, etc. Hospital sources said that super-specialty departments to be shifted to the new buildings are Neuro Surgery, Neurology, Urology, Nephrology, Medical Gastroenterology, Surgical Gastroenterology, Thoracic Medicine, Oto-Rhino-Laryngology (ENT), Cardiology, Cardio Thoracic Medicine, casualty block, laboratories, and all outpatient wards. Rajah Mirasudhar Government Hospital in town, where ENT, gynaecology, and paediatrics departments are functioning, will be left only with gynaecology and paediatrics.

== Campus ==
Hostel Fleming is the biggest hostel in TMC and is on the eastern edge of the campus. Hostel Paradise and House of Lords are the other two hostels for men. Hostel Skylark and Hostel Paragon are the women's hostels. The CRRI or House Surgeon's Hostels are for men and women.

TMC has vast expanses of land that were recently cleared of all the sludge and made green by a drive of the corporation. The college ground is vast. Four gates allow entry into the college from the Thanjavur-Vallam Road.

== See also ==
- List of Tamil Nadu Government's Educational Institutions
