= U. Mathivanan =

Indian politician

U. Mathivanan (born 30 April 1958) is a Member of Tamil Nadu State Legislative Assembly. He was elected as MLA of Tiruvarur Assembly Constituency in 2006. He is the present minister for Dairy Development in Tamil Nadu state of India. He has finished his bachelor's degree in law.
