= M. Manimaran =

Indian politician

M. Manimaran is an Indian politician and former Member of the Legislative Assembly of Tamil Nadu. He was elected to the Tamil Nadu legislative assembly as a Dravida Munnetra Kazhagam candidate from Nannilam constituency in 1977, 1984 and 1989 elections.
