= 2016 Tamil Nadu Legislative Assembly election =

Indian election

- 16 May 2016 (232 Seats); 19 November 2016 (2 Seats)

All 234 elected seats in the Tamil Nadu Legislative Assembly 118 seats needed for a majority
- Turnout: 74.24% (▼3.77%)
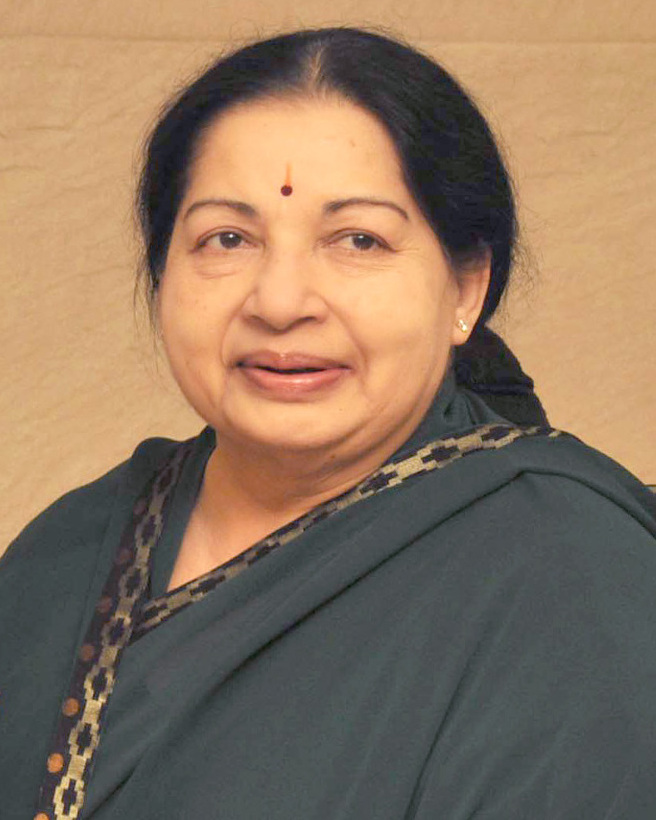

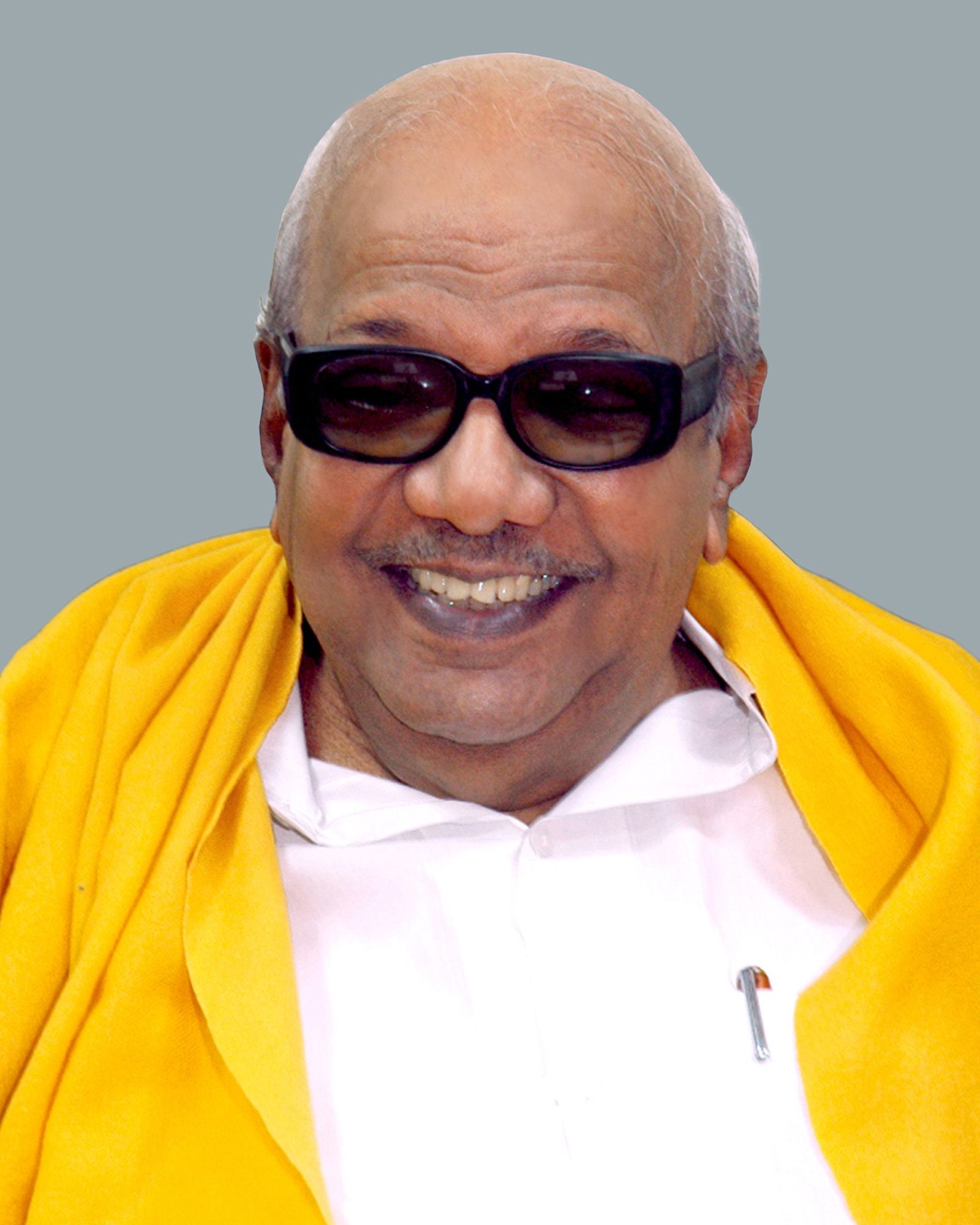
	First party	Second party
Leader	J. Jayalalithaa	M. Karunanidhi
Party	AIADMK	DMK
Alliance		DPA (Note: DPA alliance was later renamed as Secular Progressive Alliance (SPA) in 2019)
Leader since	1989	1969
Leader's seat	Dr. Radhakrishnan Nagar	Tiruvarur
Last election	150	23
Seats won	136	89
Seat change	▼14	▲66
Popular vote	17,617,060	13,670,511
Percentage	40.88%	31.39%
Swing	▼2.48 pp	▲8.99pp
Alliance seats	136	98
Alliance seat change	▼67	▲67
Alliance popular vote	17,617,060	17,175,374
Alliance percentage	40.88%	39.40%

Chief Minister before election
J. Jayalalithaa
AIADMK
Elected Chief Minister
J. Jayalalithaa
AIADMK

The Fifteenth Legislative Assembly Election was held on 16 May 2016 for the 232 seats (except Thanjavur and Aravakurichi for which held on 26 October 2016) of the Legislative Assembly in the state of Tamil Nadu in India. The AIADMK under J. Jayalalithaa won the elections and became the first ruling party to be re-elected in Tamil Nadu since 1984, though with a simple majority. The DMK won half of the seats it contested but its allies performed poorly; notably, the Indian National Congress won 16% of the seats they contested, and the alliance lost due to its poor performance. The votes were counted on 19 May 2016. In the previous election in 2011, AIADMK had, under the leadership of Jayalalithaa, won a thumping majority and formed the government, while DMDK chief Vijayakanth served as the Leader of Opposition until January 2016. 5 ministers from the outgoing cabinet were defeated in their respective constituencies. This was the last election that J. Jayalalithaa and M. Karunanidhi would contest, as they died later in 2016 and 2018, respectively.

== Background ==
By the requirement, state assembly election must be held at an interval of five years or whenever it is dissolved by the president. The previous election, to the 14th legislative assembly, was conducted 13 April 2011 and its term would have naturally expired on 22 May 2016. The election to the 15th legislative assembly was organised and conducted by the Election Commission of India (ECI) and was held in a single phase on 16 May 2016. There were over 5.79 crore voters in the electoral rolls and 65,616 polling stations in Tamil Nadu.

A special purification drive of electoral rolls between 15 and 29 February 2016 in all poll-bound States including Tamil Nadu was held, in which door-to-door verification was undertaken involving booth-level agents. On 12 February 2016, Election Commission of India announced that 17 assembly constituencies in Tamil Nadu will have Voter-verified paper audit trail (VVPAT) machines attached along with EVMs. Voter-verified paper audit trail (VVPAT) machines will be in place in 4,000 booths.

Assembly constituencies of Tamil Nadu having VVPAT facility with EVMs
Anna Nagar	Vellore	Krishnagiri
Salem North	Erode West	Tirupur (North)
Coimbatore North	Dindigul	Tiruchirappalli West
Cuddalore	Thanjavur	Kancheepuram
Villupuram	Madurai East	Thoothukudi
Tirunelveli	Kanyakumari	

== Demographics ==
At the 2011 India census, Tamil Nadu had a population of 7,21,47,030. A total of 1,44,38,445 people constituting 20.01% of the total population belonged to Scheduled Castes (SC) and 7,94,697 people constituting 1.10% of the population belonged to Scheduled tribes (ST). Other Backward Classes (OBCs) form 68% of the population. As per the religious census of 2011, Tamil Nadu had 87.6% Hindus, 5.9% Muslims, 6.1% Christians, 0.1% Jains and 0.3% following other religions or no religion.

== Schedule ==
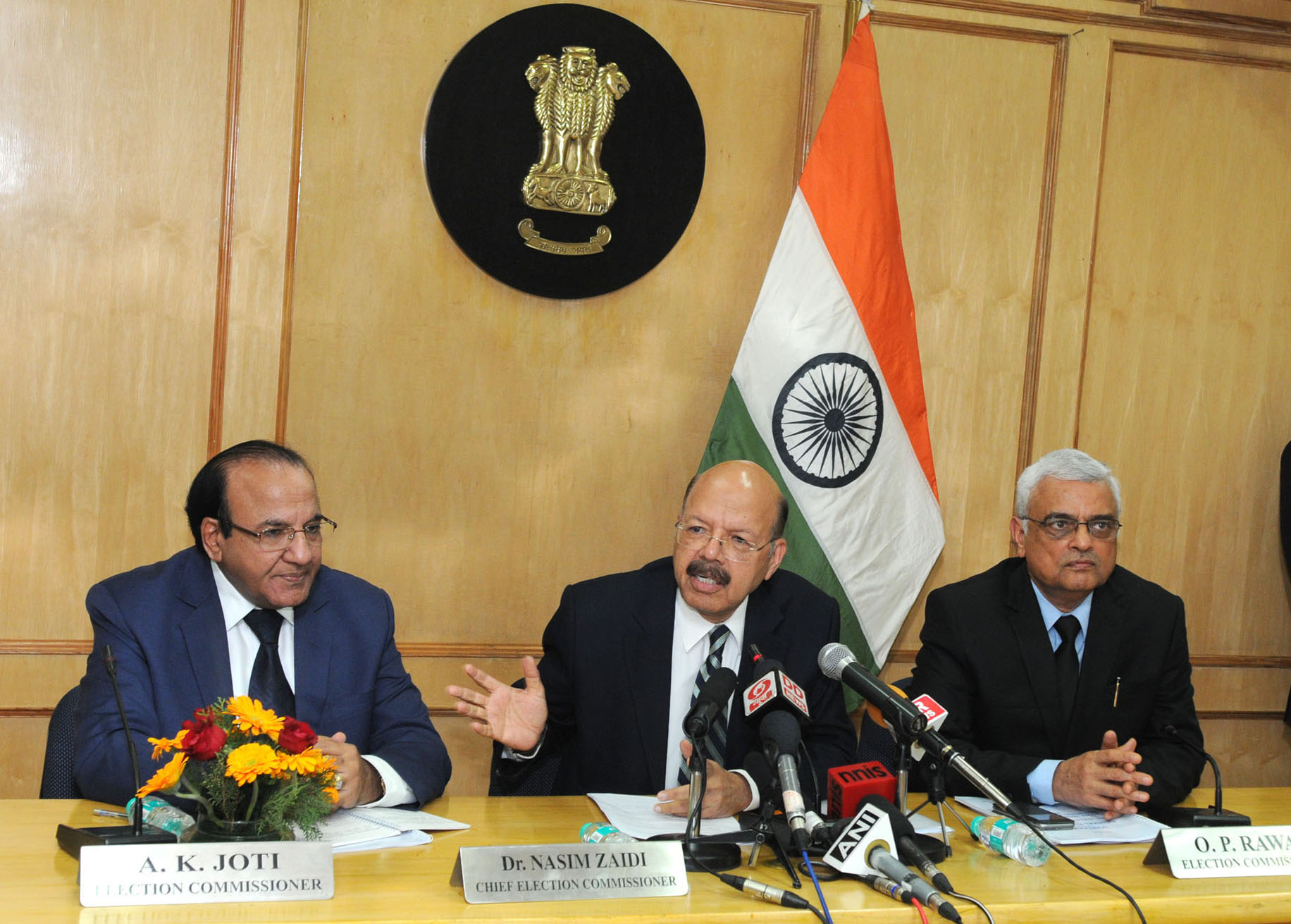
The Chief Election Commissioner of India, Nasim Zaidi holding a press conference in New Delhi on March 4, 2016, to announce the schedule for Legislative Assembly election of Tamil Nadu along with those of Assam, Kerala, West Bengal, and Puducherry.

The elections were held on 6 May 2016, with vote counting taking place on 19 May. The elections in Kerala and Puducherry also took place on 16 May but polling in two of the Tamil Nadu constituencies was postponed due to reports of voters being bribed.

Event	Date
Date for Nominations	22 April 2016
Last Date for filing Nominations	29 April 2016
Date for scrutiny of nominations	30 April 2016
Last date for withdrawal of candidatures	2 May 2016
Date of poll	16 May 2016
Date of counting	19 May 2016
Date before which the election shall be completed	21 May 2016

== Campaign to vote ==
To ensure that the electorate exercise their right to vote, the Election Commission of India (ECI) launched their own campaign in Tamil Nadu. The Chief Electoral Officer for the Tamil Nadu assembly elections, Rajesh Lakhoni, utilised social media platforms by creating memes and tweets themed around films, which have a huge reach in Tamil Nadu. Additionally, the Election Commission also recruited media personalities Suriya, Ashwin and Karthik, whose campaigning videos were filmed and shared on social media. The Election Commission also partnered with Twitter(X) for the first time in India, to boost its #TN100Percent hashtag campaign. Twitter users who have made use of the hashtag will be reminded to vote on the day of voting. Twitter and Facebook collaborated with ECI in its awareness campaign on striving for 100 per cent voting in the polls.

== Parties and Alliances ==
2016 Tamilnadu Legislative Assembly election. DMK led alliance seat sharing formula

Party/Alliance		Symbol	Leader	Contesting seats
AIADMK-led Alliance	All India Anna Dravida Munnetra Kazhagam		J. Jayalalithaa	227
AIADMK-led Alliance	Manithaneya Jananayaga Katchi		Thamimum Ansari	2
AIADMK-led Alliance	Republican Party of India		C. K. Thamizharasan	1
AIADMK-led Alliance	All India Samathuva Makkal Katchi		R. Sarathkumar	1
AIADMK-led Alliance	Tamil Nadu Kongu Ilaingar Peravai		U. Thaniyarasu	1
AIADMK-led Alliance	Mukkulathor Pulipadai		Karunas	1
AIADMK-led Alliance	Tamil Maanila Muslim League		Sheik Dawood	1
Democratic Progressive Alliance	Dravida Munnetra Kazhagam		M. Karunanidhi	176
Democratic Progressive Alliance	Indian National Congress		E. V. K. S. Elangovan	41
Democratic Progressive Alliance	Indian Union Muslim League		K. M. Khader Mohideen	5
Democratic Progressive Alliance	Manithaneya Makkal Katchi		M. H. Jawahirullah	4
Democratic Progressive Alliance	Puthiya Tamilagam		Dr. K. Krishnasamy	4
Democratic Progressive Alliance	Perunthalaivar Makkal Katchi		N. R. Dhanapalan	1
Democratic Progressive Alliance	Tamil Nadu Peasants and Workers Party		Pon. Kumar	1
Democratic Progressive Alliance	Samuga Samathuva Padai		V. Sivakami	1
People's Welfare Front	Desiya Murpokku Dravida Kazhagam		Vijayakanth	105
People's Welfare Front	Marumalarchi Dravida Munnetra Kazhagam		Vaiko	28
People's Welfare Front	Tamil Maanila Congress		G. K. Vasan	26
People's Welfare Front	Communist Party of India		Mutharasan	25
People's Welfare Front	Communist Party of India (Marxist)		G. Ramakrishnan	25
People's Welfare Front	Viduthalai Chiruthaigal Katchi		Thol. Thirumavalavan	25
National Democratic Alliance	Bharatiya Janata Party		Tamilisai Soundararajan	165
National Democratic Alliance	Inthiya Makkal Kalvi Munnetra Kazhagam		T. Devanathan Yadav	24
National Democratic Alliance	Indhiya Jananayaga Katchi		T. R. Paarivendhar	45

=== Parties not in any coalition ===
Sl. No:	Name of the Party	Party Symbol	Party Leader
1	All India Majlis-e-Ittehadul Muslimeen		Asaduddin Owaisi
2	Anaithu Makkal Munnetra Kazhagam		Pachathanni Manickam I.P.S
3	Kongunadu Makkal Desia Katchi		E.R. Eswaran
4	Social Democratic Party of India		Thehlan Baqavi
5	Pattali Makkal Katchi		Anbumani Ramadoss
6	Naam Tamizhar Katchi		Senthamizhan Seeman
7	Tamizhaga Vazhvurimai Katchi		Panruti T. Velmurugan
8	Welfare Party of India		S. N. Sikkandar

== Candidates ==
On 4 April, AIADMK released its candidate list for Tamil Nadu. On 14 April, DMK released its candidate list for Tamil Nadu.

Gopi Shankar Madurai, a 25 years old gender activist made a bid to contest as one of the youngest candidates in the Tamil Nadu Assembly election and also the first openly Intersex & Genderqueer person to do so. Gopi contested on the ticket of newly launched outfit Anaithu Makkal Munnetra Kazhagam for Madurai North. He secured 14th place out of 21 candidates.

== List of Candidates ==
Constituency		AIADMK		DPA		PWF	
#	Name	Party	Candidate	Party	Candidate	Party	Candidate
1	Gummidipoondi	ADMK	K. S. Vijayakumar	DMK	C. H. Sekar	DMDK	K. Geetha
2	Ponneri	ADMK	P. Balaraman	DMK	Dr. K. Parimalam	VCK	V. Senthil Kumar
3	Tiruttani	ADMK	P. M. Narasimhan	INC	A. G. Chidambaram	DMDK	D. Krishnamurthy
4	Thiruvallur	ADMK	A. Baskar	DMK	V. G. Raajendran	VCK	A. Balasubramani
5	Poonamallee	ADMK	T. A. Elumalai	DMK	I. Paranthamen	MDMK	D. Kandan
6	Avadi	ADMK	K. Pandiarajan	DMK	S. M. Nasar	MDMK	R. Anthridoss
7	Maduravoyal	ADMK	P. Benjamin	INC	R. Rajesh	CPI(M)	G. Beemrao
8	Ambattur	ADMK	V. Alexander	INC	J. M. H. A. Maulaana	DMDK	C. Ravindran
9	Madavaram	ADMK	D. Dhakshnamoorthy	DMK	S. Sudharsanam	CPI	A. S. Kannan
10	Thiruvottiyur	ADMK	B. Balraj	DMK	K. P. P. Samy	DMDK	A. V. Arumugam
11	R. K. Nagar	ADMK	J. Jayalalithaa	DMK	Shimla Muthuchozhan	VCK	V. Vasanthi Devi
12	Perambur	ADMK	P. Vetrivel	DMK	N. R. Dhanapalan (Note: Perunthalaivar Makkal Katchi contested on the "Rising Sun" symbol of the Dravida Munnetra Kazhagam (DMK), and is officially recorded as a DMK candidate in electoral records.)	CPI(M)	A. Soundararajan
13	Kolathur	ADMK	J. C. D. Prabhakar	DMK	M. K. Stalin	DMDK	P. Mathivanan
14	Villivakkam	ADMK	M. Raju Thadi	DMK	B. Ranganathan	DMDK	T. Pandiyan
15	Thiru-Vi-Ka-Nagar	ADMK	V. Neelakandan	DMK	P. Sivakumar	CPI(M)	Suganthi
16	Egmore	ADMK	Parithi Ilamvazhuthi	DMK	K. S. Ravichandran	DMDK	T. Prabhu
17	Royapuram	ADMK	D. Jayakumar	INC	R. Manohar	TMC	Chacko Biju
18	Harbour	ADMK	K. S. Sreenivasan	DMK	P. K. Sekar Babu	MDMK	B. Murad Buhari
19	Chepauk-Thiruvallikeni	ADMK	A. Noorjahan	DMK	J. Anbazhagan	DMDK	V. Abdulla Sait
20	Thousand Lights	ADMK	B. Valarmathi	DMK	Ku. Ka. Selvam	MDMK	C. Ambigapathy
21	Anna Nagar	ADMK	S. Gokula Indira	DMK	M. K. Mohan	MDMK	Dayalan Mallika
22	Virugampakkam	ADMK	V. N. Virugai Ravi	DMK	K. Thanasekaran	DMDK	B. Parthasarathy
23	Saidapet	ADMK	C. Ponnaiyan	DMK	Ma. Subramanian	CPI	S. Elumalai
24	Thiyagarayanagar	ADMK	B. Sathyanarayanan	DMK	Dr. N. S. Kanimozhi	DMDK	V. Kumar
25	Mylapore	ADMK	R. Nataraj	INC	R. Thiagarajan	TMC	A. S. Munavar Basha
26	Velachery	ADMK	C. Munusamy	DMK	Vagai Chandrasekhar	DMDK	N. V. Rajan
27	Sholinganallur	ADMK	N. Sundaram	DMK	S. Aravind Ramesh	VCK	R. Paneer Doss
28	Alandur	ADMK	S. Ramachandran	DMK	T. M. Anbarasan	DMDK	U. Chandran
29	Sriperumbudur	ADMK	K. Palani	INC	K. Selvaperunthagai	VCK	M. Veerakumar
30	Pallavaram	ADMK	C. R. Saraswathi	DMK	I. Karunanithi	MDMK	C. Veeralakshmi
31	Tambaram	ADMK	C. Rajendran	DMK	S. R. Raja	DMDK	M. Chezhiyan
32	Chengalpattu	ADMK	R. Kamalakkannan	DMK	M. Varalakshmi	DMDK	D. Murugesan
33	Thiruporur	ADMK	M. Kothandapani	DMK	V. Viswanathan	MDMK	C. E. Sathya
34	Cheyyur	ADMK	A. Munusamy	DMK	R. T. Arasu	VCK	Caroline Ezhil
35	Madhuranthakam	ADMK	C. K. Thamizharasan (Note: Republican Party of India contested using the All India Anna Dravida Munnetra Kazhagam (AIADMK) “Two Leaves” symbol, the ECI will officially record them as AIADMK candidates in its electoral records.)	DMK	S. Pugazhenthi	DMDK	M. Thennarasu
36	Uthiramerur	ADMK	P. Ganesan	DMK	K. Sundar	DMDK	M. Rajendran
37	Kancheepuram	ADMK	T. Mythili	DMK	Ezhilarasan	DMDK	S. Eagambaram
38	Arakkonam	ADMK	S. Ravi	DMK	N. Rajkumar	VCK	G. Gopinath
39	Sholingur	ADMK	N. G. Parthiban	INC	A. M. Munirathinam	DMDK	P. R. Manogar
40	Katpadi	ADMK	S. R. K. Appu	DMK	Durai Murugan	TMC	T. V. Sivanandam
41	Ranipet	ADMK	C. Elumalai	DMK	R. Gandhi	DMDK	S. Nithiyanandham
42	Arcot	ADMK	K. V. Ramadoss	DMK	J. L. Eswarappan	MDMK	P. N. Udhayakumar
43	Vellore	ADMK	Rasheed Harun (Note: Manithaneya Jananayaga Katchi contested using the All India Anna Dravida Munnetra Kazhagam (AIADMK) “Two Leaves” symbol, the ECI will officially record them as AIADMK candidates in its electoral records.)	DMK	Karthikeyan	VCK	A. R. Abdur Rahman
44	Anaicut	ADMK	M. Kalaiarasu	DMK	A. P. Nandakumar	TMC	P. S. Palani
45	Kilvaithinankuppam	ADMK	G. Loganathan	DMK	V. Amalu	DMDK	M. Deviyammal
46	Gudiyatham	ADMK	C. Jayanthi	DMK	K. Rajamarthandan	CPI	K. Lingamuthu
47	Vaniyambadi	ADMK	Nilofer	IUML	Farooq Syed	TMC	C. Gnanasekaran
48	Ambur	ADMK	R. Balasubramani	MNMK	V. R. Nazeer Ahmed	DMDK	R. Vasu
49	Jolarpet	ADMK	K. C. Veeramani	DMK	C. Kavitha	DMDK	A. Fayaz Basha
50	Tirupattur	ADMK	T. T. Kumar	DMK	A. Nallathambi	DMDK	K. Harikrishnan
51	Uthangarai	ADMK	N. Manoranjitham	DMK	S. Malathy	VCK	C. Kaniyamudhan
52	Bargur	ADMK	V. Rajendran	DMK	E. C. Govinddarasan	TMC	R. Rajendran
53	Krishnagiri	ADMK	V. Govindaraj	DMK	T. Senguttuvan	TMC	R. Jayaprakash
54	Veppanahalli	ADMK	Hemnath. M	DMK	P. Murugan	DMDK	N. Nagaraj
55	Hosur	ADMK	P. Balakrishna Reddy	INC	K. Gopinath	DMDK	V. Chandran
56	Thalli	ADMK	C. Nagesh	DMK	Y. Prakaash	CPI	T. Ramachandran
57	Palacode	ADMK	K. P. Anbalagan	DMK	P. K. Murugan	DMDK	K. G. Kaverivarman
58	Pennagaram	ADMK	K. P. Munusamy	DMK	P. N. P. Inbasekharan	CPI	N. Nanjappan
59	Dharmapuri	ADMK	P. D. Elangovan	DMK	P. Subramani	DMDK	V. Dr. Elangovan
60	Pappireddippatti	ADMK	P. Palaniappan	DMK	M. Prabhu Rajasekar	DMDK	A. Baskar
61	Harur	ADMK	R. Murugan	DMK	S. Rajendran	VCK	K. Govindhasamy
62	Chengam	ADMK	M. Dinagaran	DMK	M. P. Giri	DMDK	A. Kalaiarasi
63	Tiruvannamalai	ADMK	K. Rajan	DMK	E. V. Velu	DMDK	S. Manikandan
64	Kilpennathur	ADMK	K. Selvamani	DMK	K. Pitchandi	CPI	K. Jothi
65	Kalasapakkam	ADMK	V. Pannerselvam	INC	G. Kumar	DMDK	M. Nehru
66	Polur	ADMK	M. Murugan	DMK	K. V. Sekaran	CPI(M)	P. Selvan
67	Arani	ADMK	S. Ramachandran	DMK	S. Babu	DMDK	R. M. Murugavel
68	Cheyyar	ADMK	K. Mohan	INC	M. K. Vishnu Prasad	DMDK	P. Sarvanan
69	Vandavasi	ADMK	V. Meganathan	DMK	S. Ambethkumar	VCK	M. K. Metharamesh
70	Gingee	ADMK	A. Govindasamy	DMK	K. S. Masthan	MDMK	A. K. Mani
71	Mailam	ADMK	K. Annadurai	DMK	R. Masilamani	VCK	S. S. Balaji
72	Tindivanam	ADMK	S. P. Rajendran	DMK	P. Seethapathy	DMDK	M. Udhayakumar
73	Vanur	ADMK	M. Chakrapani	DMK	R. Mydili	VCK	D. Ravikumar
74	Villupuram	ADMK	C. V. Shanmugam	IUML	S. M. Ameer Abbas	DMDK	L. Vengatesan
75	Vikravandi	ADMK	R. Velu	DMK	K. Rathamani	CPI(M)	R. Ramamurthy
76	Tirukkoyilur	ADMK	G. Gothandaraman	DMK	K. Ponmudy	TMC	G. Ganesh
77	Ulundurpettai	ADMK	R. Kumaraguru	DMK	G. R. Vasanthavel	DMDK	Vijayakanth
78	Rishivandiyam	ADMK	K. Dhandapani	DMK	V. Karthikeyan	DMDK	V J P Vincent Jayaraj
79	Sankarapuram	ADMK	P. Mohan	DMK	T. Udhayasuriyan	DMDK	R. Govinthan
80	Kallakurichi	ADMK	A. Prabhu	DMK	P. Kamaraj	VCK	S. Ramamoorthy
81	Gangavalli	ADMK	A. Maruthamuthu	DMK	J. Priyadharshini	DMDK	R. Subha
82	Attur	ADMK	R. M. Chinnathambi	INC	S. K. Arthanari	VCK	K. P. Adhithyan
83	Yercaud	ADMK	G. Chitra	DMK	C. Tamilselvan	DMDK	C. Kumar
84	Omalur	ADMK	S. Vetrivel	DMK	S. Ammasi	DMDK	A. R. Elangovan
85	Mettur	ADMK	S. Semmalai	DMK	S. R. Parthiban	DMDK	R. Boopathy
86	Edappadi	ADMK	E. K. Palaniswami	DMK	P. A. Murugesan	CPI(M)	P. Thangavel
87	Sankari	ADMK	S. Raja	INC	T. K. Rajeswaran	TMC	K. Selvakumar
88	Salem (West)	ADMK	G. Venkatachalam	DMK	C. Panneer Selvam	DMDK	A. R. Mohanraj
89	Salem (North)	ADMK	K. R. S. Saravanan	DMK	R. Rajendran	TMC	R. Devadass
90	Salem (South)	ADMK	A. B. Sakthivel	DMK	M. Gunasekaran	VCK	G. Jayachandran
91	Veerapandi	ADMK	P. Manonmani	DMK	A. Rajendran	CPI	A. Mohan
92	Rasipuram	ADMK	V. Saroja	DMK	V. P. Duraisamy	VCK	G. Arjun
93	Senthamangalam	ADMK	C. Chandrasekaran	DMK	K. Ponnusamy	DMDK	M. Sathiya
94	Namakkal	ADMK	K. P. P. Baskar	INC	R. Chezhian	TMC	N. Elango
95	Paramathi-Velur	ADMK	R. Rajendhiran	DMK	K. S. Moorthy	DMDK	K. Muthukumar
96	Tiruchengode	ADMK	Pon. Saraswathi	DMK	Bar. Elangoavan	DMDK	J. Vijayakamal
97	Kumarapalayam	ADMK	P. Thangamani	DMK	P. Yuvaraj	DMDK	P. A. Madeshwaran
98	Erode (East)	ADMK	K. S. Thennarasu	DMK	V. C. Chandhirakumar	DMDK	Ponchairman
99	Erode (West)	ADMK	K. V. Ramalingam	DMK	S. Muthusamy	MDMK	N. Murugan
100	Modakkurichi	ADMK	V. P. Sivasubramani	DMK	P. Sachidanandam	DMDK	M. Ramesh
101	Dharapuram (SC)	ADMK	K. Ponnusamy	INC	V. S. Kalimuthu	MDMK	Nagai Thiruvalluvar
102	Kangayam	ADMK	U. Thaniyarasu (Note: Tamil Nadu Kongu Ilaingar Peravai contested using the All India Anna Dravida Munnetra Kazhagam (AIADMK) “Two Leaves” symbol, the ECI will officially record them as AIADMK candidates in its electoral records.)	INC	P. Gopi	DMDK	K. G. Muthu
103	Perundurai	ADMK	N. D. Venkatachalam	DMK	K. P. Samy	TMC	V. P. Shanmugam
104	Bhavani	ADMK	K. C. Karuppannan	DMK	N. Sivakumar	DMDK	P. Gopal
105	Anthiyur	ADMK	E. M. R. Raja	DMK	A. G. Venkatachalam	DMDK	M. K. Sampath Raja
106	Gobichettipalayam	ADMK	K. A. Sengottaiyan	INC	S. V. Saravanan	CPI(M)	M. Munusamy
107	Bhavanisagar	ADMK	S. Eswaran	DMK	R. Sathya	CPI	P. L. Sundaram
108	Udagamandalam	ADMK	Vinoth	INC	R. Ganesh	DMDK	K. King Narcissus
109	Gudalur	ADMK	S. Kalaiselvan	DMK	M. Thiravidamani	CPI(M)	P. Tamilmani
110	Coonoor	ADMK	A. Ramu	DMK	B. M. Mubarak	DMDK	V. Chidambaram
111	Mettuppalayam	ADMK	O. K. Chinnaraj	DMK	S. Surendran	TMC	T. R. Shanmuga
112	Avanashi (SC)	ADMK	P. Dhanapal	DMK	E. Anandhan	CPI	M. Arumugham
113	Tiruppur (North)	ADMK	K. N. Vijayakumar	DMK	M. P. Saminathan	CPI	M. Subramanian
114	Tiruppur (South)	ADMK	S. Gunasekaran	DMK	K. Selvaraj	CPI(M)	K. Thangavel
115	Palladam	ADMK	A. Natarajan	DMK	S. Krishnamoorthy	MDMK	K. Muthurathinam
116	Sulur	ADMK	R. Kanagaraj	INC	V. M. C. Manoharan	DMDK	K. Thinakaran
117	Kavundampalayam	ADMK	V. C. Arukutty	DMK	Krishnan R. Payya	CPI(M)	V. Ramamurthy
118	Coimbatore (North)	ADMK	P. R. G. Arunkumar	DMK	S. Meenalogu	DMDK	P. S. M. @ Murugan
119	Thondamuthur	ADMK	S. P. Velumani	MNMK	M. A. Kovai Syed Md.	DMDK	K. Thiyagarajan
120	Coimbatore (South)	ADMK	Amman K. Arjunan	INC	S. Mayura Jayakumar	CPI(M)	C. Padmanabhan
121	Singanallur	ADMK	N. S. Singai Muthu	DMK	N. Karthik	MDMK	A. Arjunaraj
122	Kinathukadavu	ADMK	A. Shanmugam	DMK	Prabhakaran Kurichi	MDMK	V. Eswaran
123	Pollachi	ADMK	V. Jayaraman	DMK	R. Tamilmani	DMDK	S. Muthukumar
124	Valparai	ADMK	Vasu @ V. Kasthuri	DMK	T. Paulpandi	CPI	P. Manibharathi
125	Udumalaipettai	ADMK	K. Radhakrishnan	DMK	Mu. Ka. Muthu	DMDK	S. Ganeshkumar
126	Madathukulam	ADMK	K. Manoharan	DMK	R. Jayaramakrishnan	TMC	A. S. Maheswari
127	Palani	ADMK	P. Kumarasamy	DMK	I. P. Senthil Kumar	CPI(M)	V. Rajamanickam
128	Oddanchatram	ADMK	K. Kittusamy	DMK	R. Sakkarapani	CPI	K. Santhanam
129	Athoor	ADMK	S. Shajahan	DMK	I. Periyasamy	DMDK	M. Packiya Selvaraj
130	Nilakottai	ADMK	R. Thangathurai	DMK	M. Anbazhagan	DMDK	K. Ramasamy
131	Natham	ADMK	R. Viswanathan	DMK	M. A. Andi Ambalam	DMDK	G. Karthikeyan
132	Dindigul	ADMK	C. Sreenivasan	DMK	M. Basheer Ahamed	CPI(M)	N. Pandi
133	Vedasandur	ADMK	V. P. B. Paramasivam	INC	R. Sivasakthivel	DMDK	S. R. K. Balu
134	Aravakurichi	ADMK	V. Senthil Balaji	DMK	K. C. Pallanishamy	MDMK	G. Kalaiyarasan
135	Karur	ADMK	M. R. Vijayabhaskar	INC	K. Subramanian Bank	DMDK	A. Ravi
136	Krishnarayapuram	ADMK	M. Geetha	PT	V. K. Aiyyar	TMC	K. Sivanandham
137	Kulithalai	ADMK	R. Chandrasekaran	DMK	E. Ramar	DMDK	Thangavel Jamuna
138	Manapparai	ADMK	R. Chandrasekar	IUML	M. A. Md. Nizam	DMDK	P. Krishna Gopal
139	Srirangam	ADMK	S. Valarmathi	DMK	M. Palaniyandi	CPI	V. Pushpam
140	Tiruchirappalli (West)	ADMK	R. Manoharan	DMK	K. N. Nehru	DMDK	A. Joseph Jerald
141	Tiruchirappalli (East)	ADMK	N. Natarajan	INC	G. Jerome Arockiaraj	MDMK	Md. Rohaiyaah Shaik
142	Thiruverumbur	ADMK	D. Kalaichelvan	DMK	A. M. Poyyamozhi	DMDK	S. Senthilkumar
143	Lalgudi	ADMK	M. Vijayamurthy	DMK	A. Soundara Pandian	CPI(M)	M. Jayaseelan
144	Manachanallur	ADMK	M. Parameswari	DMK	S. Ganesan	DMDK	M. Babu
145	Musiri	ADMK	M. Selvarasu	INC	S. Vijaya Babu	TMC	M. Rajasekaran
146	Thuraiyur	ADMK	A. Maivizhi	DMK	S. Stalinkumar	VCK	L. R. Sujadevi
147	Perambalur	ADMK	R. Thamizhselvan	DMK	P. Sivakami	DMDK	K. Rajendran
148	Kunnam	ADMK	R. T. Ramachandran	DMK	T. Durairaj	VCK	Aloor Shanavas
149	Ariyalur	ADMK	S. Rajendran	DMK	S. S. Sivasankar	DMDK	Rama Jayavel
150	Jayankondam	ADMK	Ramajeyalingam	INC	G. Rajendran	MDMK	M. S. Kandasamy
151	Tittakudi (SC)	ADMK	P. Ayyasamy	DMK	C. V. Ganesan	DMDK	Kumar S. Sasi
152	Vridhachalam	ADMK	V. T. Kalaiselvan	DMK	P. Govindasamy	DMDK	V. Muthukumar
153	Neyveli	ADMK	R. Rajsekar	DMK	Saba Rajendran	CPI(M)	T. Arumugam
154	Panruti	ADMK	Sathya	DMK	Ponkumar	DMDK	P. Sivakozhundu
155	Cuddalore	ADMK	M. C. Sampath	DMK	E. Pugazhendi	TMC	A. S. Chandrasekaran
156	Kurinjipadi	ADMK	R. Rajendran	DMK	M. R. K. Panneer	DMDK	K. M. S. Balamurugan
157	Bhuvanagiri	ADMK	Selvi Ramajayam	DMK	K. Saravanan Durai	VCK	Selvan Sinthanai
158	Chidambaram	ADMK	K. A. Pandian	DMK	K. R. Senthilkumar	CPI(M)	K. Balakrishnan
159	Kattumannarkoil (SC)	ADMK	N. Murugumaran	INC	Dr. K. I. Manirathinem	VCK	Thol. Thirumavalavan
160	Sirkazhi	ADMK	P. V. Bharathi	DMK	S. Killai Ravindran	DMDK	R. Umanath
161	Mayiladuthurai	ADMK	V. Rathakrishnan	DMK	K. Anbazhagan	DMDK	R. Arulselvan
162	Poompuhar	ADMK	S. Pavunraj	IUML	A. M. Shajahan	TMC	M. Sankar
163	Nagapattinam	ADMK	Thamimum Ansari	MNMK	A. Md. Jafarullah	CPI	Dhameem Ansari
164	Kilvelur	ADMK	N. Meena	DMK	U. Mathivanan	CPI(M)	V. P. Nagaimaali
165	Vedaranyam	ADMK	O. S. Manian	INC	P. V. Rajendiran	DMDK	T. Vairavanathan
166	Thiruthuraipoondi	ADMK	K. Umamaheswari	DMK	P. Adalarasan	CPI	K. Ulaganathan
167	Mannargudi	ADMK	S. Kamaraj	DMK	T. R. B. Rajaa	DMDK	A. Murugaiyan Babu
168	Tiruvarur	ADMK	R. Panneerselvam	DMK	M. Karunanidhi	CPI	P. S. Masilamani
169	Nannilam	ADMK	R. Kamaraj	INC	S. M. B. Duraivelan	CPI(M)	G. Sundaramoorthy
170	Thiruvidaimarudur	ADMK	U. Settu	DMK	Govi. Chezhian	VCK	S. Vivekanandan
171	Kumbakonam	ADMK	S. Rathna	DMK	G. Anbalagan	DMDK	D. Paramasivam
172	Papanasam	ADMK	R. Doraikkannu	INC	T. R. Loganathan	TMC	S. D. Jayakumar
173	Tiruvaiyaru	ADMK	G. M. Subramanian	DMK	Durai C.	CPI(M)	V. Jeevakumar
174	Thanjavur	ADMK	M. Rengasamy	DMK	B. Anjugam	DMDK	V. Jayaprakash
175	Orathanad	ADMK	R. Vaithilingam	DMK	M. Ramachandran	DMDK	Dr. P. Ramanathan
176	Pattukkottai	ADMK	V. Sekar	INC	K. Mahendran	DMDK	N. Senthilkumar
177	Peravurani	ADMK	M. Govindarasu	DMK	N. Ashokkumar	CPI	T. Thamayanthi
178	Gandarvakottai	ADMK	B. Arumugam	DMK	K. Anbarasan	CPI(M)	M. Chinnadurai
179	Viralimalai	ADMK	C. Vijayabaskar	DMK	M. Palaniappan	DMDK	R. Karthikeyan
180	Pudukkottai	ADMK	V. R. Karthik	DMK	Arassu Periyannan	DMDK	Hussain Jahir
181	Tirumayam	ADMK	P. K. Vairamuthu	DMK	S. Regupathy	TMC	P. L. A. Chidambaram
182	Alangudi	ADMK	Kalaiselvan Gnana	DMK	Meyyanathan Siva V	MDMK	K. Chandrasekaran
183	Aranthangi	ADMK	E. Rathinasabhapathy	INC	T. Ramachandran	CPI	P. Loganathan
184	Karaikudi	ADMK	Ilango Karpagam	INC	K. R. Ramasamy	MDMK	S. Sevanthiappan
185	Tiruppattur	ADMK	K. R. Asokan	DMK	K. R. Periyakaruppan	CPI	N. Sathiah
186	Sivaganga	ADMK	G. Baskaran	DMK	M. S. Sathianathan	CPI	S. Gunasekaran
187	Manamadurai	ADMK	S. Mariappankennady	DMK	S. Chitraselvi	VCK	Anbalagan Deepa
188	Melur	ADMK	P. Selvam	DMK	A. P. Ragupthy	TMC	T. N. Bharath
189	Madurai East	ADMK	P. Pandi	DMK	P. Moorthy	CPI	P. Kalithasan
190	Sholavandan	ADMK	K. Manickam	DMK	C. Bhavani	VCK	R. Pandiyammal
191	Madurai North	ADMK	V. V. Rajan Chellappa	INC	V. Karthikeyan	DMDK	S. Mujupur Rahuman
192	Madurai South	ADMK	S. S. Saravanan	DMK	M. Balachandran	MDMK	M. Boominathan
193	Madurai Central	ADMK	M. Jeyabal	DMK	P. T. Rajan	DMDK	D. Sivamuthukumar
194	Madurai West	ADMK	Sellur K. Raju	DMK	G. Thalapathi	CPI(M)	U. Vasuki
195	Thiruparankundram	ADMK	S. M. Seenivel	DMK	M. Manimaran	CPI	K. Kandasamy
196	Thirumangalam	ADMK	R. B. Udhayakumar	INC	R. Jeyaram	DMDK	M. Srinivasan
197	Usilampatti	ADMK	P. Neethipathi	DMK	K. Ilamakezhan	MDMK	A. B. Sethupathy
198	Andipatti	ADMK	Thanga Tamil Selvan	DMK	L. Mookiah	DMDK	M. N. Krishnamoorthy
199	Periyakulam	ADMK	K. Kathirkamu	DMK	Anbazhagan	CPI(M)	A. Lazar
200	Bodinayakkanur	ADMK	O. Panneerselvam	DMK	S. Lakshmanan	DMDK	A. Veerabadran
201	Cumbum	ADMK	S. T. K. Jakkaiyan	DMK	C. Ramakrishnan	TMC	O. R. Ramachandran
202	Rajapalayam	ADMK	A. A. S. Shyam	DMK	S. Thanga Pandian	CPI(M)	A. Gurusamy
203	Srivilliputhur	ADMK	M. Chandra Prabha	PT	C. Muthukumar	CPI	P. Lingam
204	Sattur	ADMK	S. G. Subramanian	DMK	V. Srinivasan	MDMK	A. R. Raguraman
205	Sivakasi	ADMK	K. T. Rajenthra Bhalaji	INC	C. Sreeraja	DMDK	R. Sudhakaran
206	Virudhunagar	ADMK	K. Kalanithi	DMK	A. R. R. Seenivasan	DMDK	Kaja Shareef M. Syed
207	Aruppukkottai	ADMK	Dr. Vaigaichelvan	DMK	Sattur Ramachandran	CPI	Kumar S. Senthil
208	Tiruchuli	ADMK	Babu K. Dinesh	DMK	Thangam Thennarasu	DMDK	T. Raju
209	Paramakudi	ADMK	Dr. S. Muthiah	DMK	U. Thisaiveeran	VCK	M. Irulan
210	Tiruvadanai	ADMK	Karunas (Note: Mukkulathor Pulipadai contested using the All India Anna Dravida Munnetra Kazhagam (AIADMK) “Two Leaves” symbol, the ECI will officially record them as AIADMK candidates in its electoral records.)	DMK	S. P. Thivakaran	DMDK	V. Manimaran
211	Ramanathapuram	ADMK	M. Manikandan	MNMK	M. H. Jawahirullah	DMDK	M. A. Singai Jinnah
212	Mudhukulathur	ADMK	M. Keerthika	INC	S. Pandi	MDMK	P. Rajkumar
213	Vilathikulam	ADMK	K. Uma Maheswari	DMK	S. Beemaraj	TMC	P. Kathirvel
214	Thoothukkudi	ADMK	S. T. Chellapandian	DMK	P. Geetha Jeevan	MDMK	Fatima
215	Tiruchendur	ADMK	R. Sarathkumar (Note: All India Samathuva Makkal Katchi contested using the All India Anna Dravida Munnetra Kazhagam (AIADMK) “Two Leaves” symbol, the ECI will officially record them as AIADMK candidates in its electoral records.)	DMK	R. Radhakrishnan	DMDK	S. A. Senthilkumar
216	Srivaikuntam	ADMK	S. P. Shunmuganathan	INC	V. Rani Venkatesan	TMC	S. D. R. Vijayaseelan
217	Ottapidaram	ADMK	R. Sundararaj	PT	K. Krishnasamy	DMDK	S. Arumuganainar
218	Kovilpatti	ADMK	Kadambur Raju	DMK	A. Subramanian	MDMK	Ramesh Vinayaka
219	Sankarankovil	ADMK	V. M. Rajalakshmi	DMK	G. Anbumani	MDMK	T. S. Tirumalaikumar
220	Vasudevanallur	ADMK	A. Manoharan	PT	S. Anbalagan	CPI	R. Samuthirakani
221	Kadayanallur	ADMK	Sheik Dawood (Note: Tamil Maanila Muslim League contested using the All India Anna Dravida Munnetra Kazhagam (AIADMK) “Two Leaves” symbol, the ECI will officially record them as AIADMK candidates in its electoral records.)	IUML	Md. Abubacker	DMDK	Mariappan Gothai
222	Tenkasi	ADMK	S. Selvamohandas	INC	S. Palani Nadar	TMC	N. D. S. Charles
223	Alangulam	ADMK	Hepzi Karthikeyan	DMK	Aladi Aruna	DMDK	Rajendranath
224	Tirunelveli	ADMK	Nainar Nagendran	DMK	A. L. S. Lakshmanan	DMDK	S. Madasamy
225	Ambasamudram	ADMK	R. Murugaiah Pandian	DMK	R. Avudaiappan	CPI(M)	P. Karpagavalli
226	Palayamkottai	ADMK	S. K. Hyder Ali	DMK	Mohideen Khan	MDMK	K. M. A. Mohideen
227	Nanguneri	ADMK	M. Vijayakumar	INC	H. Vasanthakumar	DMDK	K. Jeyabalan
228	Radhapuram	ADMK	I. S. Inbadurai	DMK	M. Appavu	DMDK	S. Sivanaintha
229	Kanniyakumari	ADMK	Thalavai N. Sundaram	DMK	S. Austin	DMDK	D. Aathilinga
230	Nagercoil	ADMK	A. Nanjil Murugesan	DMK	N. Suresh Rajan	MDMK	S. Christin Rani
231	Colachel	ADMK	K. T. Pachaimal	INC	J. G. Prince	MDMK	R. Sambathchandra
232	Padmanabhapuram	ADMK	K. P. Rajendra Prasad	DMK	Mano Thangaraj	DMDK	D. Jeganathan
233	Vilavancode	ADMK	Nanjil Dominic	INC	S. Vijayadharani	CPI(M)	R. Chellaswamy
234	Killiyoor	ADMK	A. Mary Kamalabai	INC	S. Rajeshkumar	TMC	D. Kumaradas

== Manifestos ==
DMK released its election manifesto on 10 April 2016. Bharatiya Janata Party released its election manifesto on 21 April 2016. Tamil Nadu Congress Committee released its election manifesto on 27 April 2016. Pattali Makkal Katchi released its draft election manifesto on 15 September 2015 and final election manifesto on 15 April 2016. AIADMK released its election manifesto on 5 May 2016.

== Voter Turnout ==
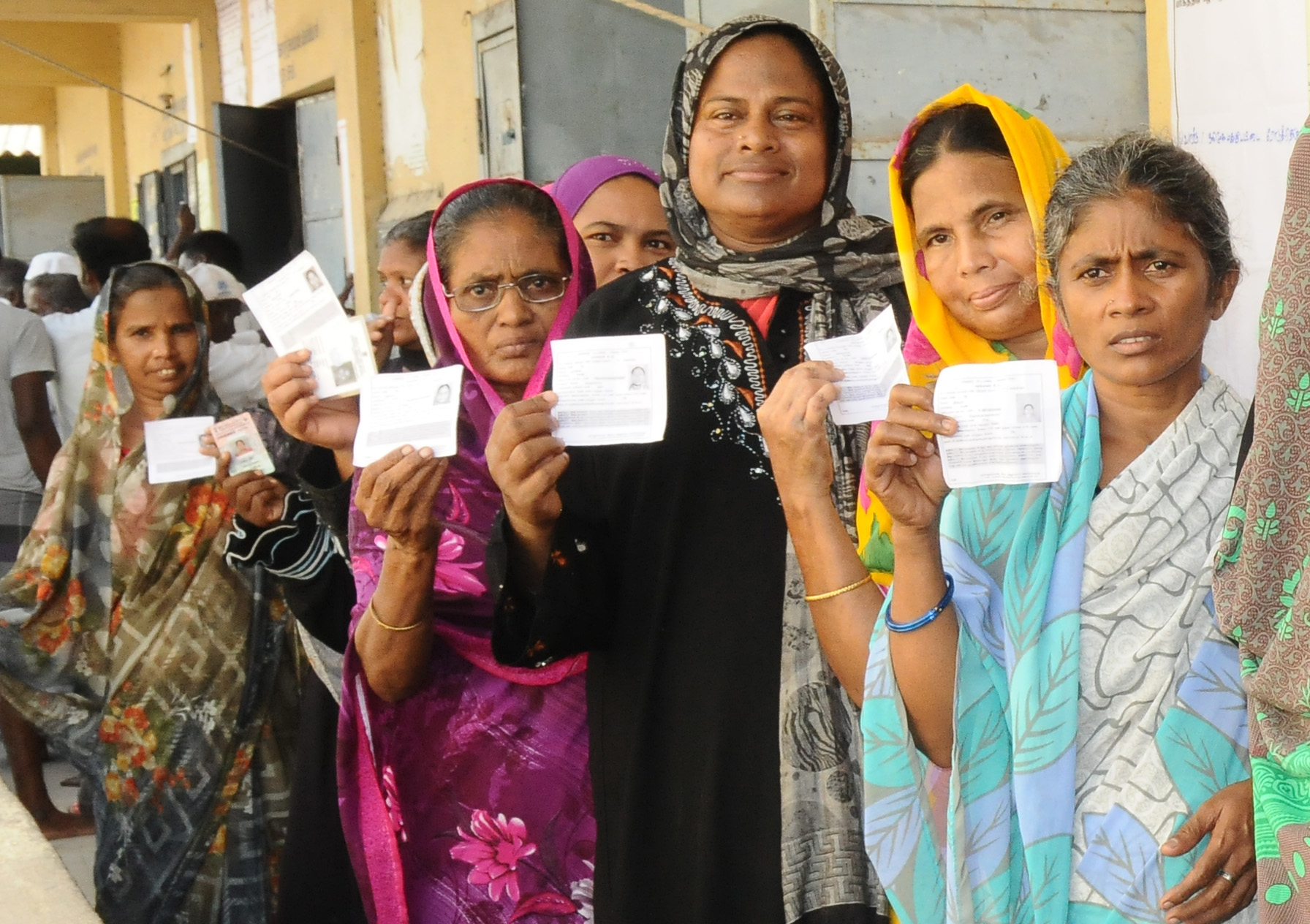
The voters showing their booth slip, at a polling booth, during the Tamil Nadu Assembly Election, in Kanchipuram on May 16, 2016.

Voter turnout for the 232 constituencies on 16 May was 74.81%. Parts of Tamil Nadu received heavy rain on the polling day, but it did not deter voters from turning out to cast their votes. While the highest voter turn out was in Dharmapuri constituency recording 85% while the lowest voter turnout was in the capital of Tamil Nadu, Chennai recording 55%. Male voter turnout was 74.15% and female voter turnout was 74.33%.

== Exit polls ==
Seat projections
Polling agency				Ref.
Polling agency	AIADMK	DPA	Others	Ref.
India Today-Axis	89–101	124–140	4-11	
News Nation	95–99	118-120	18-26	
Times Now–CVoter	139	78	17	
NewsX - Today's Chanakya	90	140	4	
ABP News–Nielsen	95	132	7	
NDTV Poll of Polls	103	120	11	
Spick News	142	87	2	
Thanthi TV	111	99	6	

== Results ==
The ruling AIADMK, beating most of the exit polls, was able to retain power with a comfortable majority and became the first party to win consecutive elections since 1984, a feat achieved by M. G. Ramachandran. Jayalalithaa bucked Anti-incumbency trend and cyclic change of governments in the state that hadn't voted back a government in last three decades.

136
AIADMK
98
DPA

=== Vote share ===
Vote share by party/alliance
1. AIADMK 40.88 (40.1%)
2. DPA 39.85 (39.1%)
3. Others 21.26 (20.8%)

Summary of the 2016 Tamil Nadu legislative election
Party/Alliance		Votes	%	Seats		
Party/Alliance		Votes	%	Contested	Won	+/-
All India Anna Dravida Munnetra Kazhagam (AIADMK)		17,806,490	40.88%	234	136	▼14
DPA	Dravida Munnetra Kazhagam (DMK)	13,670,511	31.39%	178	89	▲66
DPA	Indian National Congress	2,774,075	6.47%	41	8	▲3
DPA	Indian Union Muslim League	313,808	0.73%	5	1	▲1
DPA	Puthiya Tamilagam	219,830	0.51%	4	0	▼2
DPA	Manithaneya Makkal Katchi	197,150	0.46%	4	0	▼2
DPA	Total	17,175,374	39.40	234	98	▲66
Others		70,40,068	21.26%	234	0	Steady
Independents		617,907	1.44%	234	0	Steady
None of the above		5,65,077	1.31%	234	–	–
Total		4,35,56,184	100.00	-	234	-
Valid votes		4,35,56,184	99.93			
Invalid votes		29,507	0.07			
Votes cast / turnout		4,35,85,691	74.81			
Abstentions		1,46,74,574	25.19			
Registered voters		5,82,60,506				

Election to two assembly constituencies were cancelled by the Election Commission on confirmed reports of bribing voters in Aravakurichi and Thanjavur. Elections were held later there on 26 October 2016

=== By district ===
Number of seats secured by the alliances in each district of Tamil Nadu (2016)
District	Seats		
District	Seats	ADK	DPA
Thiruvallur	10	7	3
Chennai	16	6	10
Kancheepuram	11	2	9
Vellore	13	7	6
Krishnagiri	6	3	3
Dharmapuri	5	3	2
Thiruvanamalai	8	3	5
Villupuram	11	4	7
Salem	11	10	1
Namakkal	6	5	1
Erode	8	8	0
Nilgiris	3	1	2
Thiruppur	8	6	2
Coimbatore	10	9	1
Dindigul	7	4	3
Karur	3	3	1
Tiruchirappalli	9	5	4
Perambalur	2	2	0
Ariyalur	2	2	0
Cuddalore	9	5	4
Nagapattinam	6	5	1
Thiruvarur	4	1	3
Thanjavur	8	4	4
Pudukkottai	6	3	3
Sivaganga	4	2	2
Madurai	10	8	2
Theni	4	4	0
Virudhunagar	7	3	4
Ramanathapuram	4	3	1
Thoothukudi	6	4	2
Tirunelveli	10	5	5
Kanyakumari	6	0	6
Total	234	136	98

=== By Region ===
Alliance-wise Results
Region	Total Seats	AIADMK-led Alliance	Democratic Progressive Alliance
Northern Tamil Nadu	69	35 / 69 (51%)	34 / 69 (49%)
Western Tamil Nadu	68	52 / 68 (76%)	16 / 68 (24%)
Southern TamilNadu	51	23 / 51 (45%)	28 / 51 (55%)
Central TamilNadu	46	26 / 46 (57%)	20 / 46 (43%)

=== Results by constituency ===
Winner, runner-up, voter turnout, and victory margin in every constituency
Assembly Constituency		Winner				Runner Up				Margin
#	Name	Candidate	Party	Votes	%	Candidate	Party	Votes	%	Margin
1	Gummidipoondi	K. S. Vijayakumar	ADMK	89,332	41.68	C. H. Sekar	DMK	65,937	30.76	23,395
2	Ponneri	P. Balaraman	ADMK	95,979	48.56	Dr. Parimalam. K	DMK	76,643	38.78	19,336
3	Tiruttani	P. M. Narasimhan	ADMK	93,045	41.84	Chidambaram. A. G	INC	69,904	31.43	23,141
4	Thiruvallur	V. G. Raajendran	DMK	80,473	39.02	Baskaran. A	ADMK	75,335	36.53	5,138
5	Poonamallee	T. A. Elumalai	ADMK	103,952	43.32	Paranthamen. I	DMK	92,189	38.41	11,763
6	Avadi	K. Pandiarajan	ADMK	108,064	39.92	S. M. Nasar	DMK	106,669	39.40	1,395
7	Maduravoyal	P. Benjamin	ADMK	99,739	40.12	Rajesh R	INC	91,337	36.74	8,402
8	Ambattur	V. Alexander	ADMK	94,375	41.10	Aassan Maulaana	INC	76,877	33.48	17,498
9	Madavaram	S. Sudharsanam	DMK	122,082	45.43	Dhakshnamoorthy D	ADMK	106,829	39.76	15,253
10	Thiruvottiyur	K. P. P. Samy	DMK	82,205	43.25	Balraj. B	ADMK	77,342	40.69	4,863
11	Dr. Radhakrishnan Nagar	J. Jayalalithaa	ADMK	97,218	55.87	Shimla Muthuchozhan	DMK	57,673	33.14	39,545
12	Perambur	P. Vetrivel	ADMK	79,974	42.39	N. R. Dhanapalan	DMK	79,455	42.11	519
13	Kolathur	M. K. Stalin	DMK	91,303	54.25	Prabhakar. J. C. D	ADMK	53,573	31.83	37,730
14	Villivakkam	B. Ranganathan	DMK	65,972	43.96	Thadi M.Raju	ADMK	56,651	37.75	9,321
15	Thiru-Vi-Ka-Nagar	P. Sivakumar @ Thayagamkavi	DMK	61,744	45.25	Neelakandan. V	ADMK	58,422	42.82	3,322
16	Egmore	K. S. Ravichandran	DMK	55,060	45.64	Parithi Ellamvazhuthi E	ADMK	44,381	36.79	10,679
17	Royapuram	D. Jayakumar	ADMK	55,205	45.21	Manohar R	INC	47,174	38.63	8,031
18	Harbour	P. K. Sekar Babu	DMK	42,071	40.36	Sreenivasan K S	ADMK	37,235	35.72	4,836
19	Chepauk-Thiruvallikeni	J. Anbazhagan	DMK	67,982	47.32	A. Noorjahan	ADMK	53,818	37.46	14,164
20	Thousand Lights	K. K. Selvam	DMK	61,726	43.35	Valarmathi B	ADMK	52,897	37.15	8,829
21	Anna Nagar	M. K. Mohan	DMK	70,812	41.59	S. Gokula Indira	ADMK	69,726	40.95	1,086
22	Virugampakkam	V.N.Virugai Ravi	ADMK	65,979	38.51	K Thanasekaran	DMK	63,646	37.15	2,333
23	Saidapet	M. Subramaniam	DMK	79,279	47.18	Ponnayan.C	ADMK	63,024	37.51	16,255
24	Thiyagarayanagar	B. Sathyanarayanan	ADMK	53,207	37.47	Dr. N. S. Kanimozhi	DMK	50,052	35.25	3,155
25	Mylapore	R Nataraj IPS (Rtd)	ADMK	68,176	43.67	Karate Thiagarajan.R	INC	53,448	34.23	14,728
26	Velachery	Vagai Chanderasekar	DMK	70,139	39.96	C Munusamy	ADMK	61,267	34.91	8,872
27	Shozhinganallur	S. Aravind Ramesh	DMK	147,014	42.53	Sundaram N	ADMK	132,101	38.21	14,913
28	Alandur	Anbarasan. T.M.	DMK	96,877	44.64	Panruti S. Ramachandran	ADMK	77,708	35.81	19,169
29	Sriperumbudur	Palani. K	ADMK	101,001	42.77	K. Selvaperunthagai	INC	90,285	38.23	10,716
30	Pallavaram	Karunanithi. I	DMK	112,891	44.94	C. R. Saraswathi	ADMK	90,726	36.12	22,165
31	Tambaram	S. R. Raja	DMK	101,835	43.27	Rajendran C	ADMK	87,390	37.13	14,445
32	Chengalpattu	M. Varalakshmi	DMK	112,675	45.11	Kamalakkannan.R	ADMK	86,383	34.58	26,292
33	Thiruporur	Kothandapani. M	ADMK	70,215	34.91	Viswanathan. V	DMK	69,265	34.44	950
34	Cheyyur	Arasu R T	DMK	63,446	37.51	Munusamy A	ADMK	63,142	37.33	304
35	Madurantakam	S.Pugazhenthi	DMK	73,693	41.43	C.K.Thamizharasan	ADMK	70,736	39.77	2,957
36	Uthiramerur	K. Sundar	DMK	85,513	43.02	Ganesan.P	ADMK	73,357	36.90	12,156
37	Kancheepuram	C. V. M. P. Ezhilarasan	DMK	90,533	40.40	T.Mythili	ADMK	82,985	37.03	7,548
38	Arakkonam	S. Ravi	ADMK	68,176	41.21	Rajkumar N	DMK	64,015	38.69	4,161
39	Sholingur	N. G. Parthiban	ADMK	77,651	36.79	A. M. Munirathinam	INC	67,919	32.18	9,732
40	Katpadi	Durai Murugan	DMK	90,534	50.90	Appu S.R.K	ADMK	66,588	37.44	23,946
41	Ranipet	Gandhi. R	DMK	81,724	42.85	Elumalai. C	ADMK	73,828	38.71	7,896
42	Arcot	Eswarappan J L	DMK	84,182	41.39	Ramadoss.K.V	ADMK	73,091	35.94	11,091
43	Vellore	Karthikeyan	DMK	88,264	51.53	Harun Rasheed	ADMK	62,054	36.23	26,210
44	Anaikattu	Nandakumar. A.P	DMK	77,058	42.43	Kalaiarasu. M	ADMK	68,290	37.60	8,768
45	Kilvaithinankuppam	Loganathan.G	ADMK	75,612	45.76	Amalu V	DMK	65,866	39.86	9,746
46	Gudiyattam	Jayanthi Padmanabhan .C	ADMK	94,689	48.56	Rajamarthandan. K.	DMK	83,219	42.68	11,470
47	Vaniyambadi	Nilofer	ADMK	69,588	40.31	Syed Farooq	IUML	55,062	31.89	14,526
48	Ambur	Balasubramani R.	ADMK	79,182	49.16	Nazeer Ahmed.V.R.	MMK	51,176	31.77	28,006
49	Jolarpet	Veeramani. K. C	ADMK	82,525	45.57	Kavitha.C	DMK	71,534	39.50	10,991
50	Tirupattur (Vellore)	Nallathambi. A	DMK	80,791	45.43	Kumar.T.T	ADMK	73,144	41.13	7,647
51	Uthangarai	N.Manoranjitham	ADMK	69,980	38.75	S.Malathy	DMK	67,367	37.30	2,613
52	Bargur	V.Rajendran	ADMK	80,650	42.89	Govinddarasan.E.C	DMK	79,668	42.36	982
53	Krishnagiri	T.Senguttuvan	DMK	87,637	43.80	V.Govindaraj	ADMK	82,746	41.35	4,891
54	Veppanahalli	Murugan P	DMK	88,952	46.01	Madhu A.V.M @ Hemnath M	ADMK	83,724	43.31	5,228
55	Hosur	Balakrishna Reddy P	ADMK	89,510	41.59	Gopinath K	INC	66,546	30.92	22,964
56	Thalli	Prakaash.Y.	DMK	74,429	39.31	Ramachandran.T.	CPI	68,184	36.01	6,245
57	Palacode	K. P. Anbalagan	ADMK	76,143	40.34	Murugan. P.K.	DMK	70,160	37.17	5,983
58	Pennagaram	Inbasekaran. P.N.P.	DMK	76,848	38.49	Anbumani Ramadoss	PMK	58,402	29.25	18,446
59	Dharmapuri	Subramani. P.	DMK	71,056	34.25	Elangovan. P.D.	ADMK	61,380	29.58	9,676
60	Pappireddippatti	Palaniyappan. P	ADMK	74,234	35.56	Sathiyamoorthy. A	PMK	61,521	29.47	12,713
61	Harur	R.Murugan	ADMK	64,568	33.96	S.Rajendran	DMK	53,147	27.95	11,421
62	Chengam	Giri .M.P	DMK	95,939	45.60	Dinagaran. M	ADMK	83,248	39.57	12,691
63	Tiruvannamalai	E. V. Velu	DMK	116,484	57.15	Rajan.K	ADMK	66,136	32.45	50,348
64	Kilpennathur	Pitchandi K	DMK	99,070	50.22	Selvamani K	ADMK	64,404	32.64	34,666
65	Kalasapakkam	Panneerselvam V	ADMK	84,394	45.41	Kumar G	INC	57,980	31.20	26,414
66	Polur	Sekaran.K.V	DMK	66,588	34.02	Murugan.M	ADMK	58,315	29.80	8,273
67	Arani	Ramachandran. S	ADMK	94,074	44.89	Babu. S	DMK	86,747	41.40	7,327
68	Cheyyar	Mohan K	ADMK	77,766	37.78	Dr. Vishnuprasad M K	INC	69,239	33.64	8,527
69	Vandavasi	Ambethkumar. S	DMK	80,206	44.20	Meganathan. V	ADMK	62,138	34.24	18,068
70	Gingee	K. S. Masthan	DMK	88,440	43.99	Govindasamy A	ADMK	66,383	33.02	22,057
71	Mailam	Masilamani R	DMK	70,880	41.40	Annadurai K	ADMK	58,574	34.21	12,306
72	Tindivanam	Seethapathy P	DMK	61,879	35.33	Rajendran S P	ADMK	61,778	35.27	101
73	Vanur	Chakrapani M	ADMK	64,167	36.79	Mydili R	DMK	53,944	30.93	10,223
74	Villupuram	C V Shanmugam	ADMK	69,421	36.74	Ameer Abbas S M	IUML	47,130	24.94	22,291
75	Vikravandi	Rathamani.K	DMK	63,757	35.69	Velu R	ADMK	56,845	31.82	6,912
76	Tirukkoyilur	Ponmudy K	DMK	93,837	49.80	Gothandaraman G	ADMK	52,780	28.01	41,057
77	Ulundurpettai	Kumaraguru. R.	ADMK	81,973	36.04	Vasanthavel. G.R.	DMK	77,809	34.21	4,164
78	Rishivandiyam	Karthikeyan.K	DMK	92,607	47.08	Dhandapani.K	ADMK	72,104	36.66	20,503
79	Sankarapuram	Udhayasuriyan.T	DMK	90,920	44.72	Mohan P	ADMK	76,392	37.58	14,528
80	Kallakurichi	Prabhu A	ADMK	90,108	42.16	Kamaraj P	DMK	86,004	40.24	4,104
81	Gangavalli	Maruthamuthu.A	ADMK	74,301	42.22	Rekha Priyadharshini.J	DMK	72,039	40.94	2,262
82	Attur	Chinnathambi R M	ADMK	82,827	44.34	Arthanari S K	INC	65,493	35.06	17,334
83	Yercaud	Chitra.G	ADMK	100,562	45.18	Tamilselvan.C	DMK	83,168	37.37	17,394
84	Omalur	Vetrivel.S	ADMK	89,169	39.23	Ammasi.S	DMK	69,213	30.45	19,956
85	Mettur	Semmalai.S	ADMK	72,751	35.05	Parthiban.S.R	DMK	66,469	32.02	6,282
86	Edappadi	Edappadi K. Palaniswami	ADMK	98,703	43.74	Annadurai. N	PMK	56,681	25.12	42,022
87	Sankari	Raja.S	ADMK	96,202	44.57	Rajeswaran.T.K	INC	58,828	27.25	37,374
88	Salem (West)	Venkatachalam.G	ADMK	80,755	39.88	Panneer Selvam.C.	DMK	73,508	36.30	7,247
89	Salem (North)	Rajendran.R	DMK	86,583	45.14	Saravanan.K.R.S	ADMK	76,710	39.99	9,873
90	Salem (South)	Sakthivel A B	ADMK	101,696	51.39	Gunasekaran M	DMK	71,243	36.00	30,453
91	Veerapandi	Manonmani.P	ADMK	94,792	45.86	Rajendran. A	DMK	80,311	38.85	14,481
92	Rasipuram	Saroja V. Dr	ADMK	86,901	46.50	Duraisamy V.P	DMK	77,270	41.35	9,631
93	Senthamangalam	Chandrasekaran C	ADMK	91,339	48.09	Ponnusamy K	DMK	79,006	41.60	12,333
94	Namakkal	K. P. P. Baskar	ADMK	89,076	45.81	Chezhian. R	INC	75,542	38.85	13,534
95	Paramathi Velur	Moorthiy K S	DMK	74,418	42.45	Rajendhiran R	ADMK	73,600	41.98	818
96	Tiruchengodu	Saraswathi Pon	ADMK	73,103	41.40	Elangoavan Bar	DMK	69,713	39.48	3,390
97	Kumarapalayam	Thangamani P	ADMK	103,032	55.20	Yuvaraj P	DMK	55,703	29.84	47,329
98	Erode (East)	Thennarasu K S	ADMK	64,879	43.83	V. C. Chandhirakumar	DMK	57,085	38.57	7,794
99	Erode (West)	Ramalingam K.V.	ADMK	82,297	43.46	Muthusamy S	DMK	77,391	40.87	4,906
100	Modakkurichi	Sivasubramani . V.P.	ADMK	77,067	43.62	Sachidanandam. P.	DMK	74,845	42.36	2,222
101	Dharapuram	Kalimuthu. V.S	INC	83,538	45.67	Ponnusamy. K	ADMK	73,521	40.19	10,017
102	Kangayam	Thaniyarasu U	ADMK	83,325	45.18	Gopi P	INC	70,190	38.06	13,135
103	Perundurai	Venkatachalam.N.D	ADMK	80,292	44.05	Mohanasundaram P.	DMK	67,521	37.05	12,771
104	Bhavani	Karuppanan K C	ADMK	85,748	45.38	Sivakumar N	DMK	60,861	32.21	24,887
105	Anthiyur	E. M. R. Raja	ADMK	71,575	42.21	Venkatachalam A G	DMK	66,263	39.07	5,312
106	Gobichettipalayam	Sengottaiyan K.A	ADMK	96,177	47.00	Saravanan S.V	INC	84,954	41.52	11,223
107	Bhavanisagar	Eswaran.S	ADMK	83,006	42.23	Sathya.R	DMK	69,902	35.56	13,104
108	Udhagamandalam	Ganesh. R.	INC	67,747	48.34	Vinoth	ADMK	57,329	40.90	10,418
109	Gudalur	Thiravidamani.M.	DMK	62,128	47.39	Kalaiselvan. S.	ADMK	48,749	37.19	13,379
110	Coonoor	Ramu. A.	ADMK	61,650	45.71	Mubarak. B. M.	DMK	57,940	42.96	3,710
111	Mettupalayam	Chinnaraj.O.K	ADMK	93,595	44.41	Surendran. S.	DMK	77,481	36.76	16,114
112	Avanashi	Dhanapal P	ADMK	93,366	48.11	Anandhan E	DMK	62,692	32.31	30,674
113	Tiruppur (North)	Vijayakumar Kn	ADMK	106,717	48.56	Saminathan M P	DMK	68,943	31.37	37,774
114	Tiruppur (South)	Gunasekaran S	ADMK	73,351	44.68	Selvaraj K	DMK	57,418	34.98	15,933
115	Palladam	Natarajan. A	ADMK	111,866	47.01	Krishnamoorthy. S	DMK	79,692	33.49	32,174
116	Sulur	Kanagaraj. R.	ADMK	100,977	47.38	Manoharan. V.M.C.	INC	64,346	30.19	36,631
117	Kavundampalayam	V. C. Arukutty	ADMK	110,870	40.70	Payya Gounder @ Krishnan. R.	DMK	102,845	37.76	8,025
118	Coimbatore (North)	Arun Kumar. P.R.G.	ADMK	77,540	41.05	S.Meenalogu	DMK	69,816	36.96	7,724
119	Thondamuthur	Velumani.S.P.	ADMK	109,519	55.01	Kovai Syed	MMK	45,478	22.84	64,041
120	Coimbatore (South)	Amman K. Arjunan	ADMK	59,788	38.94	Mayura Jayakumar.S.	INC	42,369	27.60	17,419
121	Singanallur	Karthik. N.	DMK	75,459	40.02	Singai Muthu. N.	ADMK	70,279	37.28	5,180
122	Kinathukadavu	Shanmugam. A.	ADMK	89,042	42.81	Kurichi Prabhakaran	DMK	87,710	42.17	1,332
123	Pollachi	Pollachi V Jayaraman	ADMK	78,553	46.59	Tamilmani. R.	DMK	65,185	38.66	13,368
124	Valparai	Kasthuri Vasu. V.	ADMK	69,980	48.68	Paulpandi. T.	DMK	61,736	42.95	8,244
125	Udumalaipettai	Radhakrishnan. K	ADMK	81,817	44.73	Muthu. Mu. Ka	DMK	76,130	41.62	5,687
126	Madathukulam	Jayaramakrishnan R	DMK	76,619	44.66	Manoharan K	ADMK	74,952	43.69	1,667
127	Palani	Senthilkumar I P	DMK	100,045	50.66	Kumarasamy P	ADMK	74,459	37.71	25,586
128	Oddanchatram	Sakkarapani R	DMK	121,715	64.26	Kittusamy K	ADMK	55,988	29.56	65,727
129	Athoor	Periyasamy I	DMK	121,738	53.10	Shajahan S	ADMK	94,591	41.26	27,147
130	Nilakottai	Thangathurai R	ADMK	85,507	48.99	Anbazhagan M	DMK	70,731	40.52	14,776
131	Natham	Viswanathan R	ADMK	93,822	45.32	Andi Ambalam M.A	DMK	91,712	44.30	2,110
132	Dindigul	Sreenivasan C	ADMK	91,413	49.30	Basheer Ahamed M	DMK	70,694	38.13	20,719
133	Vedasandur	V. P. B. Paramasivam	ADMK	97,555	49.13	Sivasakthivel Gounder R	INC	77,617	39.09	19,938
134	Aravakurichi	V. Senthil Balaji	ADMK	88,068	53.51	K. C. Palanisamy	DMK	64,407	39.13	23,661
135	Karur	Vijayabhaskar .M.R	ADMK	81,936	43.86	Subramanian .Bank .K	INC	81,495	43.62	441
136	Krishnarayapuram	Geetha . M.	ADMK	83,977	49.82	Aiyyar . V. K.	PTK	48,676	28.88	35,301
137	Kulithalai	Ramar .E	DMK	89,923	48.85	Chandrasekaran .R	ADMK	78,027	42.39	11,896
138	Manapaarai	Chandrasekar R	ADMK	91,399	44.38	Mohamed Nizam M A	IUML	73,122	35.50	18,277
139	Srirangam	Valarmathi.S	ADMK	108,400	48.09	Palaniyandi.M	DMK	93,991	41.70	14,409
140	Tiruchirappalli (West)	Nehru.K.N	DMK	92,049	51.30	Manoharan.R	ADMK	63,634	35.47	28,415
141	Tiruchirappalli (East)	Natarajan .N.	ADMK	79,938	47.87	Jerome Arockiaraj .G.	INC	58,044	34.76	21,894
142	Thiruverumbur	Anbil Mahesh Poyyamozhi	DMK	85,950	46.98	Kalaichelvan.D	ADMK	69,255	37.85	16,695
143	Lalgudi	Soundarapandian A	DMK	77,946	46.80	Vijayamurthy M	ADMK	74,109	44.50	3,837
144	Manachanallur	Parameswari. M	ADMK	83,083	46.17	Ganesan. S	DMK	75,561	41.99	7,522
145	Musiri	Selvarasu M	ADMK	89,398	52.31	Vijaya Babu S	INC	57,311	33.53	32,087
146	Thuraiyur	Stalinkumar .S	DMK	81,444	48.10	Maivizhi .A	ADMK	73,376	43.33	8,068
147	Perambalur	R.Thamizhselvan	ADMK	101,073	45.27	P.Sivakami	DMK	94,220	42.20	6,853
148	Kunnam	Ramachandran.R.T	ADMK	78,218	38.15	Durairaj.T	DMK	59,422	28.98	18,796
149	Ariyalur	Rajendran. S	ADMK	88,523	41.94	Sivasankar. S.S	DMK	86,480	40.97	2,043
150	Jayankondam	Ramajeyalingam.J.K.N	ADMK	75,672	37.09	Guru @ Gurunathan.J	PMK	52,738	25.85	22,934
151	Tittakudi	Ganesan V	DMK	65,139	40.67	Ayyasamy P	ADMK	62,927	39.29	2,212
152	Vriddhachalam	Kalaiselvan V T	ADMK	72,611	39.22	Govindasamy P	DMK	58,834	31.78	13,777
153	Neyveli	Saba. Rajendran	DMK	54,299	34.10	Rajsekar R	ADMK	36,508	22.93	17,791
154	Panruti	Sathya.P	ADMK	72,353	39.01	Ponkumar	DMK	69,225	37.33	3,128
155	Cuddalore	Sampath M C	ADMK	70,922	41.07	Pugazhendi Ela	DMK	46,509	26.93	24,413
156	Kurinjipadi	Panneerselvam Mrk	DMK	82,864	44.03	Rajendran R	ADMK	54,756	29.09	28,108
157	Bhuvanagiri	Saravanan. Durai K.	DMK	60,554	31.73	Selvi Ramajayam	ADMK	55,066	28.85	5,488
158	Chidambaram	Pandian K A	ADMK	58,543	34.31	Senthilkumar K R	DMK	57,037	33.43	1,506
159	Kattumannarkoil	Murugumaran.N	ADMK	48,450	29.33	Thirumaavalavan.Thol	VCK	48,363	29.28	87
160	Sirkazhi	Bharathi.P.V	ADMK	76,487	43.05	Killai Ravindran.S	DMK	67,484	37.98	9,003
161	Mayiladuthurai	Rathakrishnan.V	ADMK	70,949	42.02	Anbazhagan.K	DMK	66,171	39.19	4,778
162	Poompuhar	Pavunraj.S	ADMK	87,666	45.48	Shajahan.A.M	IUML	67,731	35.14	19,935
163	Nagapattinam	Thamimun Ansari.M	ADMK	64,903	48.28	Mohamed Jafarullah.A	MMK	44,353	32.99	20,550
164	Kilvelur	Mathivanan.U	DMK	61,999	44.95	Meena.N	ADMK	51,829	37.58	10,170
165	Vedaranyam	Manian.O.S	ADMK	60,836	41.44	Rajendiran.P.V	INC	37,838	25.77	22,998
166	Thiruthuraipoondi	Adalarasan. P	DMK	72,127	41.07	Umamaheswari. K	ADMK	58,877	33.53	13,250
167	Mannargudi	T. R. B. Rajaa	DMK	91,137	48.71	Kamaraj. S	ADMK	81,200	43.40	9,937
168	Thiruvarur	Kalaignar M Karunanidhi	DMK	121,473	61.73	Pannerselvam .R	ADMK	53,107	26.99	68,366
169	Nannilam	Kamaraj. R	ADMK	100,918	49.43	Duraivelan. S.M.B	INC	79,642	39.01	21,276
170	Thiruvidaimarudur	Chezhiaan.Govi	DMK	77,538	41.93	Settu.U	ADMK	77,006	41.64	532
171	Kumbakonam	G. Anbalagan	DMK	85,048	45.04	Rathna.S	ADMK	76,591	40.56	8,457
172	Papanasam	Doraikkannu R	ADMK	82,614	45.26	Loganathan T R	INC	58,249	31.91	24,365
173	Thiruvaiyaru	Durai.Chandrasekaran	DMK	100,043	49.27	M.G.M.Subramanian	ADMK	85,700	42.21	14,343
174	Thanjavur	M.Rengasamy	ADMK	101,362	54.37	Anjugam Boopathy	DMK	74,488	39.95	26,874
175	Orathanadu	Ramchandran. M	DMK	84,378	46.87	Vaithilingam. R	ADMK	80,733	44.85	3,645
176	Pattukkottai	Sekar. V	ADMK	70,631	42.58	Mahendran. K	INC	58,273	35.13	12,358
177	Peravurani	Govindarasu M	ADMK	73,908	45.65	Ashok Kumar N	DMK	72,913	45.04	995
178	Gandharvakottai	Arumugam.B	ADMK	64,043	43.84	Anbarasan.K	DMK	60,996	41.75	3,047
179	Viralimalai	Vijaya Baskar C	ADMK	84,701	49.69	Palaniappan M	DMK	76,254	44.74	8,447
180	Pudukkottai	Periyannan Arassu	DMK	66,739	39.19	Karthik Thondaiman	ADMK	64,655	37.97	2,084
181	Thirumayam	Regupathy S	DMK	72,373	45.58	Vairamuthu Pk	ADMK	71,607	45.10	766
182	Alangudi	Meyyanathan .Siva .V	DMK	72,992	46.17	Gnana Kalaiselvan	ADMK	63,051	39.88	9,941
183	Aranthangi	Rathinasabhapathy E	ADMK	69,905	45.22	Ramachandran T	INC	67,614	43.74	2,291
184	Karaikudi	Ramasamy Kr	INC	93,419	46.40	Karpagam Ilango	ADMK	75,136	37.32	18,283
185	Tiruppattur (Sivaganga)	Periakaruppan Kr	DMK	110,719	55.72	Asokan Kr	ADMK	68,715	34.58	42,004
186	Sivaganga	Baskaran.G	ADMK	81,697	43.15	Sathianathan.M @ Meppal M.Sakthi	DMK	75,061	39.64	6,636
187	Manamadurai	Mariappankennady S	ADMK	89,893	48.45	Chitraselvi S	DMK	75,004	40.43	14,889
188	Melur	Periyapullan @ Selvam P	ADMK	88,909	51.54	Ragupthy A.P	DMK	69,186	40.11	19,723
189	Madurai East	P. Moorthy	DMK	108,569	50.62	P Pandi	ADMK	75,797	35.34	32,772
190	Sholavandan	K. Manickam	ADMK	87,044	52.33	Bhavani.C	DMK	62,187	37.39	24,857
191	Madurai North	V. V. Rajan Chellappa	ADMK	70,460	45.64	Karthikeyan. V.	INC	51,621	33.44	18,839
192	Madurai South	Saravanan .S.S.	ADMK	62,683	42.75	Balachandran .M	DMK	38,920	26.55	23,763
193	Madurai Central	Palanivel Thiagarajan	DMK	64,662	42.55	Jeyabal M	ADMK	58,900	38.75	5,762
194	Madurai West	Sellur K. Raju	ADMK	82,529	44.81	Thalapathi G	DMK	66,131	35.91	16,398
195	Thiruparankundram	S. M. Seenivel	ADMK	93,453	47.32	Manimaran M	DMK	70,461	35.68	22,992
196	Tirumangalam	Udhayakumar.R.B	ADMK	95,864	46.99	Jeyaram.R	INC	72,274	35.43	23,590
197	Usilampatti	Neethipathi P	ADMK	106,349	52.88	Ilamakezhan.K	DMK	73,443	36.52	32,906
198	Andipatti	Thanga Tamil Selvam	ADMK	103,129	51.93	Mookaiah.L	DMK	72,933	36.72	30,196
199	Periyakulam	K. Kathirkamu	ADMK	90,599	46.94	Anbazhagan	DMK	76,249	39.51	14,350
200	Bodinayakanur	O. Panneerselvam	ADMK	99,531	49.38	S. Lakshmanan	DMK	83,923	41.63	15,608
201	Cumbum	S.T.K.Jakkaiyan	ADMK	91,099	46.94	Cumbum N. Ramakrishnan	DMK	79,878	41.16	11,221
202	Rajapalayam	S. Thangappandian	DMK	74,787	43.82	A. A. S. Shyam	ADMK	69,985	41.00	4,802
203	Srivilliputhur	M. Chandra Prabha	ADMK	88,103	49.32	Muthukumar.C	PTK	51,430	28.79	36,673
204	Sattur	S. G. Subramanian	ADMK	71,513	40.65	Srinivasan.V.	DMK	67,086	38.13	4,427
205	Sivakasi	K. T. Rajenthrabhalaji	ADMK	76,734	43.67	Sreeraja. C.	INC	61,986	35.28	14,748
206	Virudhunagar	A. R. R. Seenivasan	DMK	65,499	42.71	Kalanithi.K	ADMK	62,629	40.84	2,870
207	Aruppukkottai	Ramachandran K.K.S.S.R	DMK	81,485	49.41	Vaigaichelvan.Dr	ADMK	63,431	38.46	18,054
208	Tiruchuli	Thangam Thenarasu	DMK	89,927	53.61	Dinesh Babu. K.	ADMK	63,350	37.77	26,577
209	Paramakudi	Dr. S. Muthiah	ADMK	79,254	46.89	Thisaiveeran.U	DMK	67,865	40.15	11,389
210	Tiruvadanai	Karunaas	ADMK	76,786	41.14	Thivakaran. S.P	DMK	68,090	36.48	8,696
211	Ramanathapuram	Dr. M. Manikandan	ADMK	89,365	46.30	M. H. Jawahirullah	MMK	56,143	29.09	33,222
212	Mudhukulathur	S. Pandi	INC	94,946	46.71	M.Keerthika	ADMK	81,598	40.14	13,348
213	Vilathikulam	Uma Maheswari	ADMK	71,496	46.79	Beemaraj S	DMK	52,778	34.54	18,718
214	Thoothukkudi	Geetha Jeevan. P	DMK	88,045	46.46	Chellapandian.S.T.	ADMK	67,137	35.43	20,908
215	Tiruchendur	Anitha R Radhakrishnan	DMK	88,357	52.97	R. Sarathkumar	ADMK	62,356	37.38	26,001
216	Srivaikuntam	S. P. Shanmuganathan	ADMK	65,198	41.96	Rani Venkatesan V	INC	61,667	39.69	3,531
217	Ottapidaram	R. Sundararaj	ADMK	65,071	40.57	Dr. Krishnasamy.K	PTK	64,578	40.26	493
218	Kovilpatti	Kadambur Raju	ADMK	64,514	38.96	A.Subramanian	DMK	64,086	38.70	428
219	Sankarankovil	V. M. Rajalakshmi	ADMK	78,751	44.36	Anbumani G	DMK	64,262	36.20	14,489
220	Vasudevanallur	Manoharan A.	ADMK	73,904	45.06	Anbalagan S	PTK	55,146	33.62	18,758
221	Kadayanallur	K. A. M. Muhammed Abubacker	IUML	70,763	37.49	Sheik Dawood. S	ADMK	69,569	36.86	1,194
222	Tenkasi	S. Selvamohandas Pandian	ADMK	86,339	42.58	Palani Nadar S	INC	85,877	42.35	462
223	Alangulam	Dr. Poongothai Aladi Aruna	DMK	88,891	45.98	Hepzi Karthikeyan	ADMK	84,137	43.52	4,754
224	Tirunelveli	A. L. S. Lakshmanan	DMK	81,761	43.13	Nainar Nagenthran	ADMK	81,160	42.81	601
225	Ambasamudram	R. Murugaiah Pandian	ADMK	78,555	45.80	Avudaiappan. R	DMK	65,389	38.12	13,166
226	Palayamkottai	T. P. M. Mohideen Khan	DMK	67,463	43.62	Hyder Ali S.K.A	ADMK	51,591	33.36	15,872
227	Nanguneri	H. Vasanthakumar	INC	74,932	43.45	Vijayakumar. M	ADMK	57,617	33.41	17,315
228	Radhapuram	I. S. Inbadurai	ADMK	69,590	40.62	M. Appavu	DMK	69,541	40.59	49
229	Kanniyakumari	S. Austin	DMK	89,023	42.41	Thalavai Sundaram. N	ADMK	83,111	39.59	5,912
230	Nagercoil	N. Suresh Rajan	DMK	67,369	38.87	Gandhi M.R	BJP	46,413	26.78	20,956
231	Colachel	J. G. Prince	INC	67,195	40.19	Ramesh P	BJP	41,167	24.62	26,028
232	Padmanabhapuram	Mano Thangaraj	DMK	76,249	47.20	Rajendra Prasad K P	ADMK	35,344	21.88	40,905
233	Vilavancode	S. Vijayadharani	INC	68,789	42.43	Dharmaraj C	BJP	35,646	21.98	33,143
234	Killiyoor	S. Rajesh Kumar	INC	77,356	50.47	Pon. Vijayaragavan	BJP	31,061	20.27	46,295

=== Detailed Analysis & Performance of political parties ===
Party	Contested	Won	Failed Deposit	Votes	Seats Shate in Valid Vote %	Polled in State in Seats % Contest
State Parties
AIADMK	232	135	2 (Note: Vilavancode and Thalli)	17,616,266	40.77%	41.06
DMDK	104	0	103	1,034,384	2.39%	5.42
DMK	180	88	0	13,669,116	31.64%	41.35
PMK	232	0	212	2,300,558	5.32%	5.41
State Parties - Other States
AIFB	33	0	33	44,546	0.10%	0.74
AIMIM	2	0	2	10,289	0.02%	2.78
IUML	5	1	0	313,808	0.73%	33.28
JD(S)	2	0	2	711	0.00%	0.20
JD(U)	6	0	6	2,082	0.00%	0.18
JKNPP	2	0	2	297	0.00%	0.08
LJP	23	0	23	4,146	0.01%	0.10
RJD	1	0	1	9	0 0.00%	0.05
SHS/SS	36	0	36	13,640	0.03%	0.21
SP	26	0	26	4,464	0.01%	0.09
National Parties
BJP	188	0	180	1,228,704	2.84%	3.57
BSP	158	0	156	97,823	0.23%	0.34
CPI	25	0	23	340,290	0.79%	7.25
CPI(M)	25	0	25	307,303	0.71%	6.80
INC	41	8	0	2,774,075	6.42%	36.74
NCP	20	0	20	11,842	0.03%	0.30
Registered (Unrecognised) Parties
ABHM	1	0	1	211	0.00%	0.13
AIFB(S)	2	0	2	5,950	0.01%	1.52
AIJMK	3	0	3	953	0.00%	0.15
AIPMK	2	0	2	1,321	0.00%	0.38
AIWUP	1	0	1	72	0.00%	0.04
AMMK	4	0	4	698	0.00%	0.09
APNP	3	0	3	428	0.00%	0.08
AUK	2	0	2	147	0.00%	0.04
CDF	1	0	1	170	0.00%	0.10
CPI(ML)(L)	10	0	10	4,972	0.01%	0.23
CPIM	2	0	2	378	0.00%	0.12
DCLF	1	0	1	1,411	0.00%	0.82
DMMK	1	0	1	121	0.00%	0.08
DMSK	2	0	2	199	0.00%	0.06
EDP	3	0	3	993	0.00%	0.19
ETMK	6	0	6	5,257	0.01%	0.45
FDLP	1	0	1	1,373	0.00%	0.71
FIP	4	0	4	1,359	0.00%	0.14
GAPP	3	0	3	710	0.00%	0.14
GMI	40	0	40	11,683	0.03%	0.16
GokMK	9	0	8	3,357	0.01%	0.21
GPI	6	0	6	1840	0.00%	0.16

== Controversies ==
On 3 May, News 7 and Dinamalar released an opinion poll giving an edge for DMK over AIADMK. But some editions of Dinamalar carried a statement on the first page distancing itself from the surveys. In an instance VVPAT was helpful in resolving an issue pertaining to a tally of votes in Kancheepuram Assembly constituency as the number of votes entered in the Form 17C of a polling booth and the total number of votes recorded in the EVM control unit of that booth did not tally.

=== Cash for votes ===
Wide spread allegations of parties bribing voters with cash were raised and the Election commission responded by increasing the number of flying squads to conduct raids and prevent distribution of cash for votes. First time in the Indian history Rs 570 crores of three containers captured in Tirupur, no one claimed for that money at the first day. Later SBI claimed that money. Many parties like CPI(M), CPI, VCK, MDMK, PMK, wanted clear information about that money.

=== Postponement of polls ===
The Election Commission postponed the polls in Aravakurichi and Thanjavur constituencies due to reports of distribution of huge sums of money and alcohol to voters. The polling was initially postponed to 13 June, despite the Governor of Tamil Nadu requesting that it should happen before 1 June. The date was subsequently amended to November.

== Bypolls ==
On 26 October 2016, the Election Commission announced that the election for Thiruparankundram, Aravakurichi and Thanjavur constituencies would be held on 19 November 2016. The outcome was:

Constituency	Contestant DMK	Contestant ADMK	Winning candidate	Winning party	Margin
Aravakurichi	K. C. Palanisamy	V. Senthil Balaji	V. Senthil Balaji	AIADMK	23,661
Thanjavur	Anjugam Boopathy	M. Rangaswamy	M. Rangaswamy	AIADMK	26,874
Thiruparankundram	Saravanan	A. K. Bose	A. K. Bose	AIADMK	42,670

S.No	Date	Constituency	MLA before election	Party before election	Elected MLA	Party after election
1	18 April 2019	Thiruvarur	M. Karunanidhi	Dravida Munnetra Kazhagam	K. Poondi Kalaivanan	Dravida Munnetra Kazhagam
2	18 April 2019	Ambur	R. Balasubramani	All India Anna Dravida Munnetra Kazhagam	A. C. Vilwanathan	Dravida Munnetra Kazhagam
3	18 April 2019	Andipatti	Thanga Tamil Selvan	All India Anna Dravida Munnetra Kazhagam	A. Maharajan	Dravida Munnetra Kazhagam
4	18 April 2019	Gudiyattam	C. Jayanthi Padmanabhan	All India Anna Dravida Munnetra Kazhagam	S. Kathavarayan	Dravida Munnetra Kazhagam
5	18 April 2019	Hosur	P. Balakrishna Reddy	All India Anna Dravida Munnetra Kazhagam	S. A. Sathya	Dravida Munnetra Kazhagam
6	18 April 2019	Perambur	P. Vetrivel	All India Anna Dravida Munnetra Kazhagam	R. D. Sekar	Dravida Munnetra Kazhagam
7	18 April 2019	Periyakulam	K. Kathirkamu	All India Anna Dravida Munnetra Kazhagam	S. Saravana Kumar	Dravida Munnetra Kazhagam
8	18 April 2019	Poonamallee	T. A. Elumalai	All India Anna Dravida Munnetra Kazhagam	A. Krishnaswamy	Dravida Munnetra Kazhagam
9	18 April 2019	Thanjavur	M. Rangaswamy	All India Anna Dravida Munnetra Kazhagam	T. K. G. Neelamegam	Dravida Munnetra Kazhagam
10	18 April 2019	Thiruporur	M. Kothandapani	All India Anna Dravida Munnetra Kazhagam	L. Idhayavarman	Dravida Munnetra Kazhagam
11	18 April 2019	Harur	R. Murugan	All India Anna Dravida Munnetra Kazhagam	V. Sampathkumar	All India Anna Dravida Munnetra Kazhagam
12	18 April 2019	Manamadurai	S. Mariappankennady	All India Anna Dravida Munnetra Kazhagam	S. Nagarajan	All India Anna Dravida Munnetra Kazhagam
13	18 April 2019	Nilakottai	R. Thangathurai	All India Anna Dravida Munnetra Kazhagam	S. Thenmozhi	All India Anna Dravida Munnetra Kazhagam
14	18 April 2019	Pappireddyppatti	P. Palaniappan	All India Anna Dravida Munnetra Kazhagam	A. Govindasamy	All India Anna Dravida Munnetra Kazhagam
15	18 April 2019	Paramakudi	S. Muthiah	All India Anna Dravida Munnetra Kazhagam	N. Sadhan Prabhakar	All India Anna Dravida Munnetra Kazhagam
16	18 April 2019	Sattur	S. G. Subramanian	All India Anna Dravida Munnetra Kazhagam	M. S. R. Rajavarman	All India Anna Dravida Munnetra Kazhagam
17	18 April 2019	Sholinghur	N. G. Parthiban	All India Anna Dravida Munnetra Kazhagam	G. Sampathu	All India Anna Dravida Munnetra Kazhagam
18	18 April 2019	Vilathikulam	K. Uma Maheswari Reddiar	All India Anna Dravida Munnetra Kazhagam	P. Chinnappa Reddiar	All India Anna Dravida Munnetra Kazhagam
19	19 May 2019	Sulur	R. Kanagaraj	All India Anna Dravida Munnetra Kazhagam	P. Kandasamy	All India Anna Dravida Munnetra Kazhagam
20	19 May 2019	Aravakurichi	V. Senthil Balaji	All India Anna Dravida Munnetra Kazhagam	V. Senthil Balaji	Dravida Munnetra Kazhagam
21	19 May 2019	Ottapidaram	R. Sundararaj	All India Anna Dravida Munnetra Kazhagam	C. Shunmugaiah	Dravida Munnetra Kazhagam
22	19 May 2019	Tirupparankundram	A. K. Bose	All India Anna Dravida Munnetra Kazhagam	P. Saravanan	Dravida Munnetra Kazhagam
23	21 October 2019	Vikravandi	K. Rathamani	Dravida Munnetra Kazhagam	R. Muthamilselvan	All India Anna Dravida Munnetra Kazhagam
24	21 October 2019	Nanguneri	H. Vasanthakumar	Indian National Congress	V. Narayanan	All India Anna Dravida Munnetra Kazhagam

== See also ==
- Elections in India
- 2016 elections in India
