= By-elections to the 15th Tamil Nadu Assembly =

By elections in Tamil Nadu, India

Tamil Nadu assembly by-election, 2016-17
- 19 November 2016 and 21 December 2017

vacant seats in the Legislature of Tamil Nadu
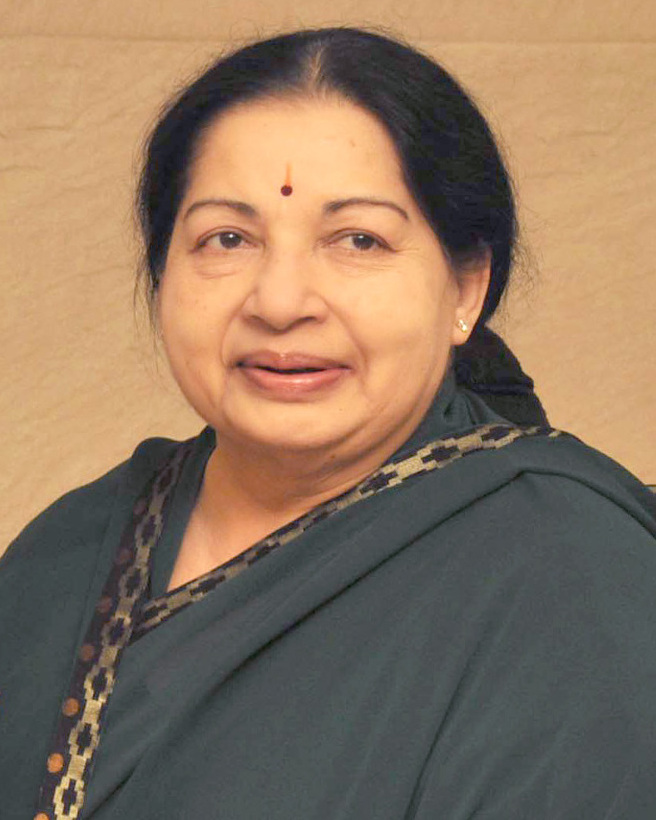

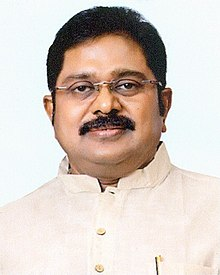
	First party	Second party
Leader	J. Jayalalithaa	T. T. V. Dhinakaran
Party	AIADMK	Independent
Alliance	AIADMK+
Seats won	3 (Note: Aravanchi election was postponed in main election)	1

During the 2016–2017 timeframe, by-elections were held in Tamil Nadu, India, due to the following events:

- 25 May 2016 - Tirupparankundram AIADMK MLA S M Seenivel died
- 5 December 2016 - Radhakrishnan Nagar AIADMK MLA and CM of Tamil Nadu J. Jayalalithaa died

== Events leading to By-Election ==
Date	Event	ADMK	DMK	INC	IUML	Independent	Vacant	Total
19 May 2016	2016 Tamil Nadu Legislative Assembly election (Election to Aravakurichi and Thanjavur were cancelled by the EC on confirmed reports of bribing voters)	134	89	8	1	0	2	232
25 May 2016	Tirupparankundram AIADMK MLA S M Seenivel dies	133	89	8	1	0	3	231
22 November 2016	First By-Election (19 November 2016)	136	89	8	1	0	0	234
6 December 2016	RK Nagar AIADMK MLA, Tamil Nadu CM J. Jayalalithaa dies	135	89	8	1	0	1	233
18 September 2017	Disqualification of 18 dissident AIADMK MLAs	117	89	8	1	0	19	215
24 December 2017	Second By-Election (21 December 2017)	117	89	8	1	1	18	216
2 August 2018	Tirupparankundram AIADMK MLA A.K. Bose dies	116	89	8	1	1	19	215
7 August 2018	Tiruvarur DMK MLA, Former CM of Tamil Nadu CM M Karunanidhi dies	116	88	8	1	1	20	214
20 February 2019	Hosur AIADMK MLA P. Balakrishna Reddy convicted by special court	115	88	8	1	1	21	213
21 March 2019	Sulur AIADMK MLA R Kanagaraj dies	114	88	8	1	1	22	212
23 May 2019	Third By-Election (18 April 2019)	123	101	8	1	1	0	234
29 May 2019	Nanguneri, Congress MLA Vasanthakumar resigned after being elected to Lok Sabha	123	101	7	1	1	1	233
14 June 2019	Vikravandi DMK MLA K Radhamani dies	123	100	7	1	1	2	232

The 123 AIADMK members include three independents who contested under the AIADMK symbol. They are M.Thamimun Ansari from Nagapattinam (Manithaneya Jananayaga Katchi), U. Thaniyarasu from Kangayam (Tamil Nadu Kongu Ilaingar Peravai) and Karunas from Tiruvadanai (Mukkulathor Pulipadai).

== November 2018 by-elections ==
On 26 October 2016, the Election Commission announced that the election for Thiruparankundram, Aravakurichi and Thanjavur constituencies would be held on 19 November 2016. The outcome was:

Constituency	Contestant DMK	Contestant ADMK	Winning candidate	Winning party	Margin
Aravakurichi	K. C. Palanisamy	V. Senthil Balaji	V. Senthil Balaji	AIADMK	23,661
Thanjavur	Anjugam Boopathy	M. Rangaswamy	M. Rangaswamy	AIADMK	26,874
Thiruparankundram	Saravanan	A. K. Bose	A. K. Bose	AIADMK	42,670

=== Aravakuruchi ===
2016 Tamil Nadu Legislative Assembly election: Aravakurichi
Party	Candidate	Votes	%	±%
AIADMK	V. Senthil Balaji	88,068	53.51	
DMK	K. C. Palanisamy	64,407	39.13	
BJP	S. Prabhu	3,162	1.92	New
NOTA	None of the above	1,538	0.93	
DMDK	M. Muthu	1,513	0.92	New
Majority		23,661	14.38	
Turnout		1,64,582	82.15	
AIADMK gain from DMK		Swing		

=== Tanjore ===
2016 Tamil Nadu Legislative Assembly election: Thanjavur
Party	Candidate	Votes	%	±%
AIADMK	M. Rangaswamy	1,01,362	54.37	
DMK	Anjugam Boopathy	74,488	39.95	
BJP	Ramalingam M S	3,806	2.04	
NOTA	None of the above	2,295	1.23	
DMDK	Abdullah Sait V	1,534	0.82	
Majority		26,874	14.41	
Turnout		1,86,444	69.37	
AIADMK hold		Swing		

=== Thirupparakundram ===
2016 Tamil Nadu Legislative Assembly bye-election: Thiruparankundram
Party	Candidate	Votes	%	±%
AIADMK	A. K. Bose	113,032	55.65	▲8.33
DMK	P. Saravanan	70,362	36.73	▲1.05
NOTA	None of the Above	2,214	1.10	▼0.48
Majority		42,670	18.92	▲7.28
Turnout		203,100	70.89	▲0.26
AIADMK hold		Swing	▲8.33	

== December 2017 by-elections ==
On 24 November 2017, the Election Commission announced that the election for Radhakrishnan Nagar constituency would be held on 21 December 2017.

2017 Tamil Nadu Legislative Assembly By-election: Dr. Radhakrishnan Nagar
Party	Candidate	Votes	%	±%
Independent	T. T. V. Dhinakaran	89,013	50.32	N/A
AIADMK	E. Madhusudhnan	48,306	27.31	−28.56
DMK	N. Marudhu Ganesh	24,651	13.94	−19.2
NTK	Kalaikottuthayam	3,802	2.15	N/A
None of the Above	NOTA	2,373	1.34	−0.31
Margin of victory		40,707	23.01	+0.28
Turnout		1,76,890	77.68	+9.32
Independent gain from AIADMK		Swing		

== 2019 by-elections ==
2019 Tamil Nadu Legislative Assembly by-elections
- 18 April 2019 (18 seats), 19 May 2019 (4 seats), 21 Oct 2019 (2 seats)

24 vacant seats out of 234 seats in the Tamil Nadu Legislative Assembly 118 seats needed for a majority
- Turnout: 75%
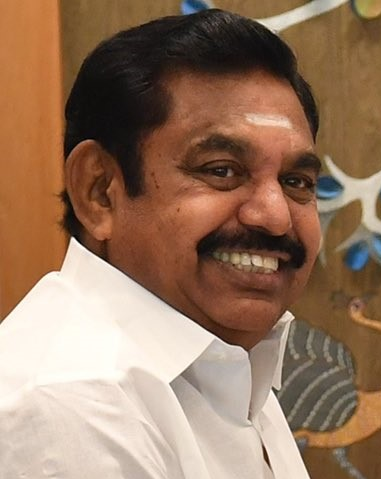

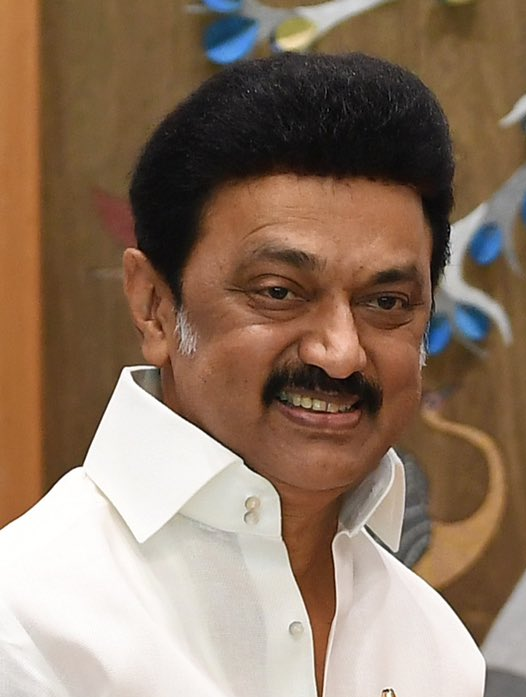
	First party	Second party
Leader	Edappadi K. Palaniswami	M. K. Stalin
Party	AIADMK	DMK
Alliance	NDA	UPA
Leader's seat	Edappadi	Kolathur
Last election	21	3
Seats before	133	99 (Alliance)
Seats won	11	13
Seats after	123	109 (Alliance)
Seat change	▼10	▲10
Percentage	39.86%	42.85%
Chief Minister before election
Edappadi K. Palaniswami
AIADMK
Chief Minister after election
Edappadi K. Palaniswami
AIADMK

By-elections to eighteen state assembly constituencies were held in Tamil Nadu on 18 April 2019 together with 2019 Indian general election. It was considered to be mini-assembly election battle for the power in Tamil Nadu. The ruling government had to prove its majority while the opposition was trying hard to get maximum seats. There were 22 seats vacant in the Tamil Nadu assembly, By-election took place in two phases and in the first phase for 18 assembly constituencies together with Lok Sabha general election on 18 April 2019 in the state. Remaining 4 assembly constituencies (Ottapidaram, Aravakurichi, Tiruparankundram and Sulur) election was held on 19 May. The counting of votes was conducted on 23 May, and on the same day the results were announced. Then the by-elections for 2 seats Vikravandi and Nanguneri were conducted on 21 October 2019.

== Political turmoil and leadership changes (2016–2017) ==
=== 2016 Tamil Nadu Legislative Assembly election ===
The backdrop for the political upheaval in Tamil Nadu unfolded with the 2016 Tamil Nadu Legislative Assembly election held on 16 May 2016. In a surprising turn of events, the AIADMK, led by the charismatic Chief Minister J Jayalalithaa, defied the odds presented by opinion polls and secured a victory by winning 136 seats out of 234. The Dravida Munnetra Kazhagam (DMK), led by M K Stalin, emerged as the principal opposition party. J Jayalalithaa died in December, leading to a series of consequential events.

=== Transition of power and leadership struggles ===
Following J Jayalalithaa's demise, O Paneerselvam, the former two time Chief Minister and then Finance Minister in her cabinet, assumed the role of Chief Minister on behalf of the AIADMK. However, in January 2017, Paneerselvam resigned, paving the way for the controversial election of V K Sasikala as the next Chief Minister. The pending verdict on Sasikala's misappropriation case in the Supreme Court prompted a delay in her appointment by the Governor of Tamil Nadu.

Within days of her election, Sasikala faced a legal setback, as she was convicted and sentenced to four years in prison, rendering her ineligible for the Chief Minister's position. Simultaneously, Paneerselvam refused to comply with Sasikala's directives, leading to the formation of a rebel faction comprising 11 MLAs. Paneerselvam sought an opportunity to prove his majority in the assembly and retain the office of Chief Minister.

=== Resort confinement and appointment of Edappadi K Palanisami ===
In an effort to prevent horse-trading, the remaining AIADMK MLAs were sequestered in a resort in Kuvathoor near Chennai for a week. During this time, Sasikala handpicked Minister Edappadi K Palanisami as her choice for Chief Minister. Palanisami was subsequently elected by the MLAs in the resort. To avert a constitutional crisis, the Governor swore in Palanisami as the Chief Minister, despite opposition from the OPS faction.

The subsequent motion of confidence in the Legislature witnessed turmoil and physical tuggle, with 11 MLAs from the OPS faction voting against Palanisami and all opposition MLAs walking out. Nevertheless, he managed to secure majority support, solidifying his position as the Chief Minister.

=== Reconciliation and fallout ===
O Paneerselvam later rejoined the AIADMK, assuming the role of Deputy Chief Minister in the latter half of 2017. Subsequently, VK Sasikala and her supporters were expelled from the AIADMK. In a dramatic turn of events, 19 MLAs from the Sasikala faction submitted a letter of no confidence against the Chief Minister to the Governor. The Speaker of the Tamil Nadu Legislative Assembly, responding to a complaint from the Government Whip, disqualified all of them, with the exception of MLA Jakkaiyan, who was acquitted after submitting a letter of apology.

The 18 disqualified MLAs appealed to the Judiciary to nullify the Speaker's decision, with the last verdict from the division bench of Madras High Court coming against them in January 2019. They then decided to fight the by-elections as candidates of the newly formed Amma Makkal Munnetra Kazhagam alongside the Lok Sabha elections, rather let it sit at the Supreme Court of India.

== Further disqualification and ministerial loss ==
In addition to the political turbulence, the AIADMK faced another setback when ADMK minister P. Balakrishna Reddy was convicted in an old arson case. Consequently, he not only lost his ministerial position but also faced disqualification as the MLA from the Hosur Assembly constituency.

== Loss of political veterans ==
The political landscape of Tamil Nadu experienced a profound shift with the demise of key political figures.

In August 2018, the revered 5-time former chief minister of Tamil Nadu and president of the Dravida Munnetra Kazhagam (DMK), M Karunanidhi, died, marking the end of an era in Tamil Nadu politics. Karunanidhi's significant contributions to the state's governance and his longstanding influence on the DMK left an indelible mark on Tamil Nadu's political history.

Adding to the somber note, the DMK suffered another loss in September 2018 with the passing of MLA Mr Ramani in a Road accident. His dedication and service to the party were acknowledged as the political landscape mourned the loss of a committed representative.

Continuing the sequence of unfortunate events, in 2019, the AIADMK mourned the demise of MLA Kanagaraj in Sulur due to a heart attack. His contributions to the party and the Hosur constituency left a void, marking yet another chapter in the evolving political narrative of Tamil Nadu.

== Potential shift in political landscape ==
Historically, Tamil Nadu had witnessed a stable political scenario with no midterm switch of power from the ruling party to opposition. As the 2016 elections approached, the incumbent AIADMK government, armed with 112 MLAs, found itself six seats short of a majority to sustain its administration for the remaining two years.

The Dravida Munnetra Kazhagam (DMK), having been relegated to the third position in the 2011 Tamil Nadu Elections, was unable to reclaim power in the subsequent 2016 Tamil Nadu Elections. The DMK led Secular Progressive Alliance, entered the by-elections with 98 MLAs. Their strategic goal was to secure victory in 20 out of the 24 contested seats, thereby guaranteeing a historic change in government. The stakes were high as both parties vied for a significant political shift in the state.

=== By-election event ===
==== Phase 1 ====
Phase 1 By-Elections will be held for 18 vacant assembly constituencies in Tamil Nadu.

By-Election Event	Date
Election Date Announcement	10.03.2019
Last Date for Filling Nominations	26.03.2019
Scrutiny	27.03.2019
Withdrawal Last Date	29.03.2019
Voting	18.04.2019
Results	23.05.2019

==== Phase 2 ====
Phase 2 By-Elections will be held for the remaining 4 vacant assembly constituencies in Tamil Nadu.

By-Election Event	Date
Election Date Announcement	09.04.2019
Last Date for Filling Nominations	29.04.2019
Scrutiny	30.04.2019
Withdrawal Last Date	02.05.2019
Voting	19.05.2019
Results	23.05.2019

=== Notable party-wise contesting candidates list ===
There are 36 candidates from the Recognized State political party, 46 candidates from the other registered regional parties and 187 Independent politicians for of total 269 candidates for the 18 seats by-election officially announced by Tamil Nadu election commission .

Party	Seats contested	Seats won	Change
All India Anna Dravida Munnetra Kazhagam	22	9	12▼
Dravida Munnetra Kazhagam	22	13	12▲
Amma Makkal Munnettra Kazagam	22	00	00
Makkal Needhi Maiam	20	00	00
Naam Tamilar Katchi	22	00	00
Independent politician	22	00	00

=== Opinion polls ===
Date published	Polling agency				Others	Lead^{α}
Date published	Polling agency	NDA-AIADMK	UPA-DMK	AMMK	Others	Lead^{α}
8 April 2019	Thanthi TV	8-9	8-9	0	0	1
8 April 2019	Junior Vikatan	1	17	0	0	16

=== Exit polls ===
Date published	Polling agency				Others	Lead^{α}
Date published	Polling agency	NDA-AIADMK	UPA-DMK	AMMK	Others	Lead^{α}
21 May 2019	India Today	3	14	0	0	11

=== Constituencywise trends ===
Constituency	DMK	AIADMK	AMMK	MNM	NTK	Winning candidate	Winning party	Margin
Phase 1 - 18.04.2019
Poonamallee	A. Krishnaswamy	G.Vaidyanathan	T. A. Elumalai	A. Jagadish Kumar	P.Bharathi Priya	A. Krishnaswamy	DMK	60,096
Perambur	RD Sekar	R S Raajesh	P. Vetrivel	U. Priyadarshini	S.Merlin Sugandhi	RD Sekar	DMK	68,023
Thiruporur	SR Idhayavarman	Tirukazhukundram S Arumugam	M.Kothandapani	K.U. Karunakaran (I.K.K)	Mohana Sundhari	SR Idhayavarman	DMK	21,013
Sholingur	A Ashokan	G Sampathu	T.G.Mani	K.S. Malairajan	Gokula Krishnan	G Sampathu	AIADMK	16,056
Gudiyatham (SC)	S Kathavarayan	Kaspa R Moorthy	Jeyanthi Pathmanaban	S.Venkatesan (I.K.K)	K.Kalayenthiri	S Kathavarayan	DMK	27,841
Ambur	A.C.Vilwanathan	R Jothiramalingaraja	R.Balasubramani	A.Kareem Bahsa	N.Selvamani	A.C.Vilwanathan	DMK	37,767
Hosur	S.A.Sathya	S.Jyothi Balakrishna Reddy	V.Pugazhendi	Jeyapal	M.Rajashekar	S.A.Sathya	DMK	23,213
Pappireddipatti	A Mani	A Govindasamy	D.K.Rajendran	M. Nallathambi	S.Sathish	A Govindasamy	AIADMK	18,493
Harur (SC)	A Krishnakumar	V Sampathkumar	R.Murugan	---	P.Thileep	V Sampathkumar	AIADMK	9,394
Nilakottai (SC)	C.Soundara Pandiyan	S Thenmozhi	R.Thangathurai	R. Chinnadurai	A.Sangili Pandiayan	S Thenmozhi	AIADMK	20,675
Tiruvarur	Poondi Kalaivanan	R.Jeevanatham	S.Kamaraj	K. Arun Chidambaram	R.Vinothini	Poondi Kalaivanan	DMK	64,571
Thanjavur	TKG Neelamegam	R Gandhi	M. Rangaswamy	P.Duraisamy	M.Karthick	TKG Neelamegam	DMK	33,980
Manamadurai (SC)	Ilakiyadasan	S Nagarajan	Mariyappan Kennady	---	Shanmuga Priya	S Nagarajan	AIADMK	8,194
Andipatti	A Maharajan	A Logirajan	R.Jayakuamr	G.Azharsamy	R.Aruna Devi	A Maharajan	DMK	12,323
Periyakulam (SC)	KS Saravana Kumar	M Mayilvel	Kadhirkamu	K. Prabhu	Shobana	KS Saravana Kumar	DMK	20,320
Sattur	SV Srinivasan	M S R Rajavarman	S.G Subramanian	N. Sundararaj	P.Sureshkumar	M S R Rajavarman	AIADMK	1,101
Paramakudi (SC)	S Sampath Kumar	N Sadanparabhakar	Dr. S. Muthiah	A.Shankar	Hemalatha	N Sadanparabhakar	AIADMK	14,032
Vilathikulam	A.C.Jayakumar	P Chinnappan	K.Jothimany	T. Natarajan	M.Kalidoss	P Chinnappan	AIADMK	28,554
Phase 2 - 19.05.2019
Aravakurichi	V. Senthil Balaji	VV Senthil Nathan	Shahul Hameed	S. Mohanraj	P.K.Selvam	V.Senthil Balaji	DMK	37,957
Sulur	Pongalur N. Palanisamy	V.P.Kandhasamy	K.Sukumar	G. Mayilsamy	V.Vijaya Ragavan	V.P.Kandhasamy	AIADMK	10,113
Thiruparankundram	P.Saravanan	S.Muniyandi	I.Mahendran	P. Shaktivel	R.Revathi	P.Saravanan	DMK	2,396
Ottapidaram	M.C.Shanmugaiya	P.Mohan	R.Sundararaj	M.Gandhi	M.Agalya	M.C.Shanmugaiya	DMK	19,657

Source - Election Commission of India

=== Constituencywise candidate results ===
==== Poonamallee ====
2019 Tamil Nadu Legislative Assembly by-elections: Poonamallee
Party	Candidate	Votes	%	±%
DMK	A. Krishnaswamy	1,36,905	53.46	15.01▲
AIADMK	G. Vaithiyanathan	76,809	29.99	13.33▼
MNM	A. Jagadish Kumar	11,772	4.60	4.60▲
AMMK	{{{candidate}}}			

== See also ==
- Elections in Tamil Nadu
