= C. Ramachandran =

Indian politician

C. Ramachandran is an Indian politician and was a Member of the Legislative Assembly of Tamil Nadu. He was elected to the Tamil Nadu legislative assembly as a Dravida Munnetra Kazhagam (DMK) candidate from Thirupparankundram constituency in the 1996 election.
