= Thiruparankundram Assembly constituency =

One of the 234 State Legislative Assembly Constituencies in Tamil Nadu

Coordinates: 9.88°N 78.07°E

Thiruparankundram
- Constituency No. 195 for the Tamil Nadu Legislative Assembly

Constituency details
- Country: India
- Region: South India
- State: Tamil Nadu
- District: Madurai
- Lok Sabha constituency: Virudhunagar
- Established: 1957
- Total electors: 311,705
- Reservation: None

Member of Legislative Assembly
- 17th Tamil Nadu Legislative Assembly
- Incumbent C. T. R. Nirmal Kumar
- Party: TVK
- Elected year: 2026

Thiruparankundram State Assembly constituency (Tamil: திருப்பரங்குன்றம் சட்டமன்றத் தொகுதி) is one of the 234 state legislative assembly constituencies in Tamil Nadu in southern India. It is also one of the six state legislative assembly constituencies included in Virudhunagar Lok Sabha constituency. It is one of the oldest assembly segments in Tamil Nadu, being in existence since the 1957 election.

== Members of the Legislative Assembly ==
Year	Member	Party
1957	Chinnakaruppa Thevar	Indian National Congress
1962	Chinnakaruppa Thevar	Indian National Congress
1967	S. Agniraju	Dravida Munnetra Kazhagam
1971	C. Kaverimaniam	Dravida Munnetra Kazhagam
1977	K. Kalimuthu	All India Anna Dravida Munnetra Kazhagam
1980	K. Kalimuthu	All India Anna Dravida Munnetra Kazhagam
1984	M. Marimuthu	All India Anna Dravida Munnetra Kazhagam
1989	C. Ramachandran	Dravida Munnetra Kazhagam
1991	S. Andi Thevar	All India Anna Dravida Munnetra Kazhagam
1996	C. Ramachandran	Dravida Munnetra Kazhagam
2001	S. M. Seenivel	All India Anna Dravida Munnetra Kazhagam
2006	A. K. Bose	All India Anna Dravida Munnetra Kazhagam
2011	A. K. T. Raja	Desiya Murpokku Dravida Kazhagam
2016	S. M. Seenivel	All India Anna Dravida Munnetra Kazhagam
2016	A. K. Bose	All India Anna Dravida Munnetra Kazhagam
2019	P. Saravanan	Dravida Munnetra Kazhagam
2021	V. V. Rajan Chellappa	All India Anna Dravida Munnetra Kazhagam
2026	C. T. R. Nirmal Kumar	Tamilaga Vettri Kazhagam

== Election results ==
Vote share of winning candidates
2026	44.75%
2021	43.96%
2019 by-election	37.79%
2016	55.65%
2016	47.32%
2011	58.70%
2006	42.82%
2001	48.93%
1996	60.75%
1991	59.60%
1989	43.55%
1984	53.47%
1980	60.53%
1977	41.39%
1971	50.41%
1967	63.94%
1962	42.82%
1957	43.71%

=== 2026 ===
2026 Tamil Nadu Legislative Assembly election: Thiruparankundram
Party	Candidate	Votes	%	±%
TVK	C. T. R. Nirmal Kumar	114,316	44.75	New
DMK	Kiruthiga Thangapandi	72,763	28.48	
AIADMK	Rajanchellappa V V	49,865	19.52	▼24.44
NOTA	None of the above	1,148	0.45	
Margin of victory		41,553	16.27	▲3.77
Turnout		2,55,466	81.96	▲8.60
Registered electors		3,11,705		
TVK gain from AIADMK		Swing		

=== 2021 ===
2021 Tamil Nadu Legislative Assembly election: Thiruparankundram
Party	Candidate	Votes	%	±%
AIADMK	V. V. Rajan Chellappa	103,683	43.96	▲7.23
CPI(M)	Ponnuthai	74,194	31.46	New
MNM	M. Bharanirajan	16,750	7.1	▲1.52
AMMK	K. David Annadurai	10,190	4.32	▼9.48
NOTA	None of the Above	2,073	0.88	▼0.09
Majority		29,489	12.5	▲11.44
Turnout		235,849	73.36	▼0.83
AIADMK gain from DMK		Swing	▲7.23	

=== 2019 by-election ===
By-election, 2019: Thiruparankundram
Party	Candidate	Votes	%	±%
DMK	P. Saravanan	85,434	37.79	▲1.06
AIADMK	S. Muniyandi	83,038	36.73	▼18.92
AMMK	I. Mahendran	31,199	13.80	New
MNM	P. Sakthivel	12,610	5.58	New
NOTA	None of the Above	2,184	0.97	▼0.13
Majority		2,396	1.06	▼17.86
Turnout		2,26,078	74.19	▲4.29
DMK gain from AIADMK		Swing	▲1.06	

=== 2016 by-election ===
Bye-election, 2016: Thiruparankundram
Party	Candidate	Votes	%	±%
AIADMK	A. K. Bose	113,032	55.65	▲8.33
DMK	P. Saravanan	70,362	36.73	▲1.05
NOTA	None of the Above	2,214	1.10	▼0.48
Majority		42,670	18.92	▲7.28
Turnout		2,03,100	70.89	▲0.26
AIADMK hold		Swing	▲8.33	

=== 2016 ===
2016 Tamil Nadu Legislative Assembly election: Thiruparankundram
Party	Candidate	Votes	%	±%
AIADMK	S. M. Seenivel	93,453	47.32	New
DMK	Sedapatti Manimaran	70,461	35.68	New
CPI	K. Kandasamy	15,275	7.73	New
BJP	S. Arumugam	7,698	3.90	▲1.72
NOTA	None of the Above	3,111	1.58	New
Majority		22,992	11.64	▼18.18
Turnout		197,650	70.69	▼5.39
AIADMK gain from DMDK		Swing	New	

=== 2011 ===
2011 Tamil Nadu Legislative Assembly election: Thiruparankundram
Party	Candidate	Votes	%	±%
DMDK	A. K. T. Raja	95,469	58.70	▲43.85
INC	C. R. Sundararajan	46,967	28.88	New
BJP	R. Kandhan	3,543	2.18	▲0.54
BSP	P. Selvam	1,251	0.77	▲0.18
JMM	L. Nagamani	865	0.53	New
Majority		48,502	29.82	▲25.19
Turnout		162,630	76.08	▲5.49
DMDK gain from AIADMK		Swing	▲43.85	

=== 2006 ===
2006 Tamil Nadu Legislative Assembly election: Thiruparankundram
Party	Candidate	Votes	%	±%
AIADMK	A. K. Bose	117,306	42.82	▼6.11
CPI(M)	S. Venkatesan	104,620	38.19	New
DMDK	G. Rajamanickam	40,684	14.85	New
BJP	S. Surendran	4,482	1.64	New
BSP	V. Mahalingam @ Chittrarasu	1,595	0.59	New
JD(U)	G. Eswaran	1,348	0.50	New
Majority		12,686	4.63	▼0.74
Turnout		274,018	70.59	▲14.61
AIADMK hold		Swing	▼6.11	

=== 2001 ===
2001 Tamil Nadu Legislative Assembly election: Thiruparankundram
Party	Candidate	Votes	%	±%
AIADMK	S. M. Seenivel	83,167	48.93	▲25.72
DMK	C. Ramachandran	74,040	43.56	▼17.19
MDMK	M. D. Chinnachellam	4,850	2.85	New
JP	A. Sasikumar	1,226	0.72	▼1.46
Majority		9,127	5.37	▼32.21
Turnout		169,993	55.98	▼7.59
AIADMK gain from DMK		Swing	▲25.72	

=== 1996 ===
1996 Tamil Nadu Legislative Assembly election: Thiruparankundram
Party	Candidate	Votes	%	±%
DMK	C. Ramachandran	99,379	60.75	▲22.83
AIADMK	S. V. Shanmugam	37,970	23.21	▼36.39
CPI(M)	K. Kandasamy	18,192	11.12	New
JP	V. Guruvan	3,564	2.18	New
BJP	S. Parankundram	2,049	1.25	New
KNMK	V. S. Raju	800	0.49	New
SHS	R. Raja Guru	276	0.17	New
Majority		61,409	37.58	▲15.90
Turnout		170,248	63.52	▲6.38
DMK gain from AIADMK		Swing	▲22.83	

=== 1991 ===
1991 Tamil Nadu Legislative Assembly election: Thiruparankundram
Party	Candidate	Votes	%	±%
AIADMK	S. Andi Thevar	83,180	59.60	▲36.25
DMK	C. Ramachandran	52,923	37.92	▼5.63
PMK	K. Pohhiah	1,660	1.19	New
IC(S)	K. Muthuramalingam Pandian	358	0.26	New
Majority		30,257	21.68	▲1.48
Turnout		142,729	57.14	▼12.16
AIADMK gain from DMK		Swing	▲36.25	

=== 1989 ===
1989 Tamil Nadu Legislative Assembly election: Thiruparankundram
Party	Candidate	Votes	%	±%
DMK	C. Ramachandran	64,632	43.55	▲1.65
AIADMK	V. Rajan Chellappa	34,656	23.35	▼30.12
AIADMK	M. Marimuthu	26,521	17.87	New
Majority		29,976	20.20	▲8.63
Turnout		150,572	69.30	▲0.64
DMK gain from AIADMK		Swing	▲1.65	

=== 1984 ===
1984 Tamil Nadu Legislative Assembly election: Thiruparankundram
Party	Candidate	Votes	%	±%
AIADMK	M. Marimuthu	58,559	53.47	▼7.06
DMK	Ayyanan Ambalam	45,886	41.90	▲3.61
INC(J)	V. Rajan Chellappa	3,658	3.34	New
Majority		12,673	11.57	▼10.67
Turnout		113,690	68.66	▲5.40
AIADMK hold		Swing	▼7.06	

=== 1980 ===
1980 Tamil Nadu Legislative Assembly election: Thiruparankundram
Party	Candidate	Votes	%	±%
AIADMK	K. Kalimuthu	61,247	60.53	▲19.14
DMK	P. Seeni Thevar	38,740	38.29	▲20.15
Majority		22,507	22.24	▲0.12
Turnout		102,199	63.26	▲3.99
AIADMK hold		Swing	▲19.14	

=== 1977 ===
1977 Tamil Nadu Legislative Assembly election: Thiruparankundram
Party	Candidate	Votes	%	±%
AIADMK	K. Kalimuthu	33,850	41.39	New
INC	V. Palaniandi Ambalam	15,760	19.27	New
DMK	C. Kaverimaniam	14,834	18.14	▼32.27
JP	C. Maharajan	12,188	14.90	New
Majority		18,090	22.12	▲6.36
Turnout		82,533	59.27	▼10.29
AIADMK gain from DMK		Swing	New	

=== 1971 ===
1971 Tamil Nadu Legislative Assembly election: Thiruparankundram
Party	Candidate	Votes	%	±%
DMK	C. Kaverimaniam	39,110	50.41	▼13.53
INC(O)	I. Pandythevar	26,880	34.64	New
CPI(M)	K. P. Janakiammal	10,613	13.68	New
Majority		12,230	15.76	▼13.34
Turnout		84,674	69.56	▼8.11
DMK hold		Swing	▼13.53	

=== 1967 ===
1967 Madras Legislative Assembly election: Thiruparankundram
Party	Candidate	Votes	%	±%
DMK	S. Agniraju	49,169	63.94	▲39.50
INC	S. Sonaimuthu	26,792	34.84	▼7.98
ABJS	D. V. Raghavan	942	1.22	New
Majority		22,377	29.10	▲16.66
Turnout		81,596	77.67	▲0.65
DMK gain from INC		Swing	▲39.50	

=== 1962 ===
1962 Madras Legislative Assembly election: Thiruparankundram
Party	Candidate	Votes	%	±%
INC	S. Chinnakaruppa Thevar	35,491	42.82	▼0.89
CPI	Janakiammal	25,179	30.38	▼8.09
DMK	Muthu	20,258	24.44	New
Majority		10,312	12.44	▲7.19
Turnout		85,367	77.02	▲30.73
INC hold		Swing	▼0.89	

=== 1957 ===
1957 Madras Legislative Assembly election: Thiruparankundram
Party	Candidate	Votes	%	±%
INC	S. Chinnakaruppa Thevar	19,258	43.71	New
CPI	K. P. Janaki	16,947	38.47	New
Independent	N. Muthu Thevar	7,852	17.82	New
Majority		2,311	5.25	New
Turnout		44,057	46.29	New
INC win (new seat)				
