= A. K. T. Raja =

Indian politician

A. K. T. Raja is an Indian politician and incumbent Member of the Tamil Nadu Legislative Assembly from the Thiruparankundram constituency. He represents the Desiya Murpokku Dravidar Kazhagam party.
