= C. T. R. Nirmal Kumar =

Indian politician (born 1981)

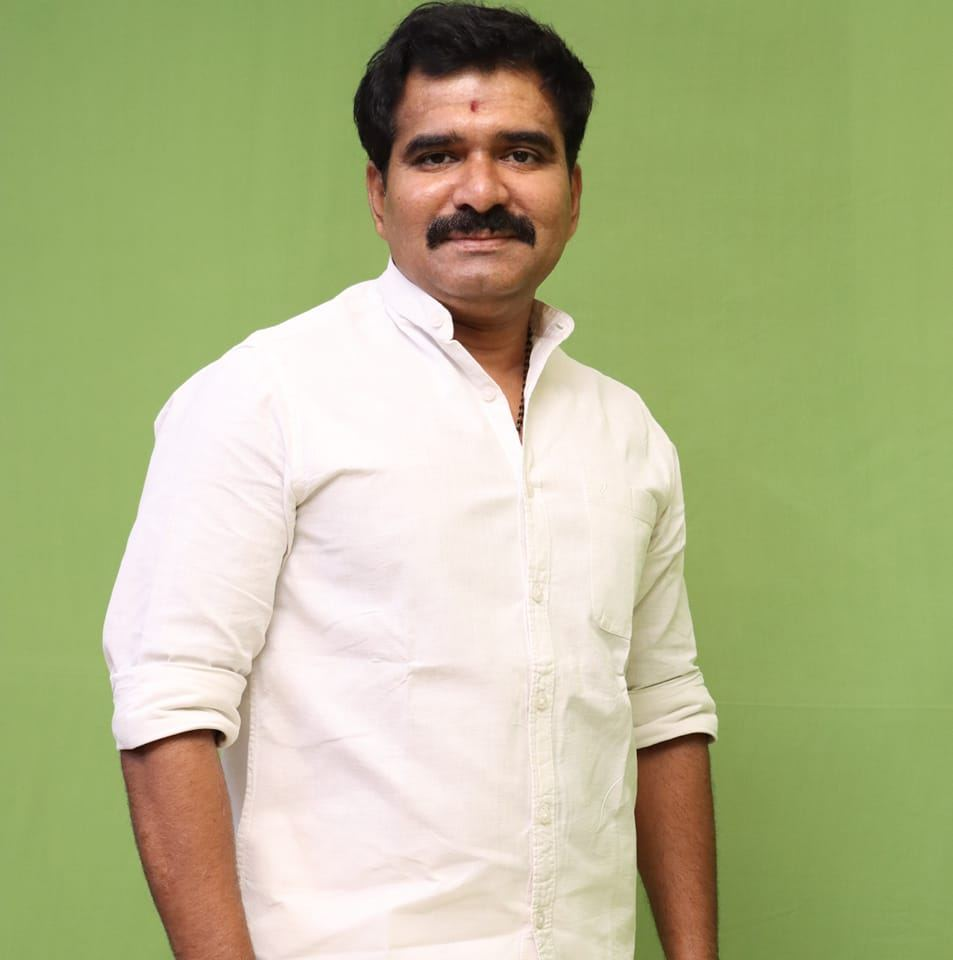

Cabinet Minister Government of Tamil Nadu
- Incumbent
- Assumed office 10 May 2026
- Chief Minister: C. Joseph Vijay
- Departments: Electricity and Energy resources; Law; Prisons and Correctional Services; Prevention of Corruption; Elections; Legislative Assembly

Member of the Tamil Nadu Legislative Assembly
- Incumbent
- Assumed office 10 May 2026
- Preceded by: V. V. Rajan Chellappa
- Constituency: Thiruparankundram

Deputy General Secretary (IT and Social Media), Tamilaga Vettri Kazhagam
- Incumbent
- Assumed office 31 January 2025
- President: C. Joseph Vijay

Personal details
- Born: 27 July 1981 (age 45) Usilampatti, Madurai, Tamil Nadu, India
- Party: Tamilaga Vettri Kazhagam (2025–present)
- Other political affiliations: All India Anna Dravida Munnetra Kazhagam (2023–2025); Bharatiya Janata Party (2019–2023)
- Education: RMK Engineering College (BE); Bangalore Law School (BL); Madurai Kamaraj University (MA)

C. T. R. Nirmal Kumar (born 27 July 1981) is an Indian politician from Tamil Nadu. He is the elected Member of Legislative Assembly (MLA) representing the Thiruparankundram Assembly constituency in Madurai district, having won in the 2026 Tamil Nadu Legislative Assembly election. He serves as Deputy General Secretary for IT and Social Media of the Tamilaga Vettri Kazhagam (TVK), appointed on 31 January 2025. He is inducted into the first ministry of Vijay on 10 May 2026.

During Nirmal Kumar's tenure as Minister, Tamil Nadu experienced frequent power outages, prompting electricity procurement from private firms at higher costs. In October 2026, two prison escapes were reported, including the Andipatti prisoners escape, described as one of the largest in Tamil Nadu in three decades.

== Early life and education ==
Nirmal Kumar was born on 27 July 1981 in Usilampatti, Madurai district, Tamil Nadu. He completed his 10th standard at KVS Matriculation School, Virudhunagar, and 12th standard at TMHNU School, Theni. He obtained a Bachelor of Engineering in Computer Science from RMK Engineering College, Kavaraipettai, Chennai. He earned a Bachelor of Laws from Bangalore Law School. He completed a Master of Arts in Criminology and Police Administration from Madurai Kamaraj University.

== Political career ==
=== Bharatiya Janata Party ===
Nirmal Kumar served as State President of the IT and Social Media Wing of the BJP in Tamil Nadu from 2019 to 2023. He resigned from the BJP on 5 March 2023.

=== All India Anna Dravida Munnetra Kazhagam ===
On 5 March 2023, Nirmal Kumar joined the AIADMK in the presence of Edappadi K. Palaniswami, interim general secretary of the AIADMK. He served as Joint Secretary of the IT and Social Media Wing of the AIADMK until 2025.

=== Tamilaga Vettri Kazhagam ===
On 31 January 2025, Nirmal Kumar joined the Tamilaga Vettri Kazhagam (TVK) at a ceremony at the party headquarters in Panaiyur, Chennai. He was appointed Deputy General Secretary for IT and Social Media of TVK on the same date.

=== 2026 election ===
In the 2026 Tamil Nadu Legislative Assembly election, Nirmal Kumar contested from Thiruparankundram as a TVK candidate. He won with a margin of 41,553 votes and secured 1,14,316 votes. The DMK's Kiruthiga Thangapandi received 72,763 votes. The AIADMK's V. V. Rajan Chellappa also contested the seat.

=== Ministership (2026-precent) ===
Following TVK's victory in the 2026 Tamil Nadu Assembly election, Nirmal became a member of the 17th Tamil Nadu Legislative Assembly. on 10 May 2026 and was assigned portfolios including Electricity & Non-Conventional Energy Development, Law, Courts, Prisons, Prevention of Corruption, Governor(Legislative) and Elections and Passports.

Following the formation of the TVK government in Tamil Nadu in 2026, unscheduled power cuts were reported in several parts of the state, including Chennai. The interruptions, particularly during night-time hours, with unscheduled power cuts of two to three hours, prompted residents in several districts to stage protests and road blockades, demanding regular electricity supply.

On 30 September 2026, the Tamil Nadu Power Distribution Corporation Limited (TNPDCL) requested high-tension electricity consumers to use their own generator sets during evening peak hours, to reduce demand on the state's electricity grid amid power supply constraints. 12 October 2026, the Tamil Nadu Secretariat's main building caused a temporary power outage affecting several ministers' offices.

On 13 October 2026, TNPDCL reportedly signed agreements to procure 4,500 MW of short-term electricity at ₹37 per unit amid power shortages across the state. The rate was reported to be the highest at which the Tamil Nadu government had purchased electricity. In comparison, electricity in Andhra Pradesh was reportedly being purchased at rates ranging from ₹14 to ₹17 per unit. Former Chief Minister Edappadi K. Palaniswami and a former electricity minister criticised the procurement cost. Palaniswami alleged that the government had cancelled earlier power procurement agreements in May, when the quoted rate was ₹20 per unit, and questioned the revised rate of ₹37 per unit, alleging irregularities in the procurement process.

On 26 October 2026, 17 prisoners escaped from Thekkampatti sub-jail near Andipatti in Theni district after allegedly assaulting a prison guard who entered their cell in response to a fabricated medical emergency. The incident was reported as one of the largest prison escapes in Tamil Nadu in three decades. Earlier that week, two prisoners had escaped from Puzhal Central Prison, where Chief Minister C. Joseph Vijay had conducted an inspection in August. The incidents raised concerns about security lapses in prisons across the state.

== Electoral history ==
Year	Constituency	Party	Votes	%	Opponent	Opponent Party	Opponent Votes	%	Result	Margin	%
2026	Thiruparankundram	TVK	1,14,316		Kiruthiga Thangapandi	DMK	72,763		Won	41,553	

== See also ==
- 2026 Tamil Nadu Legislative Assembly election
- Tamilaga Vettri Kazhagam
- Thiruparankundram Assembly constituency
- C. Joseph Vijay
