= A. K. Bose =

Indian politician

A. K. Bose (1949–2018) was an Indian politician and member of the Tamil Nadu Legislative Assembly from the Thirupparankundram Constituency (2006-2011) and again from 2011-2016 from the Madurai North constituency. He represented the All India Anna Dravida Munnetra Kazhagam party. He had a wife named Bagyalakshmi and four children.

The elections of 2016 resulted in his constituency being won by V. V. Rajan Chellappa.

He died on 2 August 2018 due to a heart attack.

Elections Contested and Results

| Year | Constituency | Result |
|---|---|---|
| 2006 | Thirupparankundram | Won |
| 2011 | Madurai North | Won |
| 2016 | Thirupparankundram | Won |
