= V. V. Rajan Chellappa =

Indian politician

V.V. Rajan Chellappa
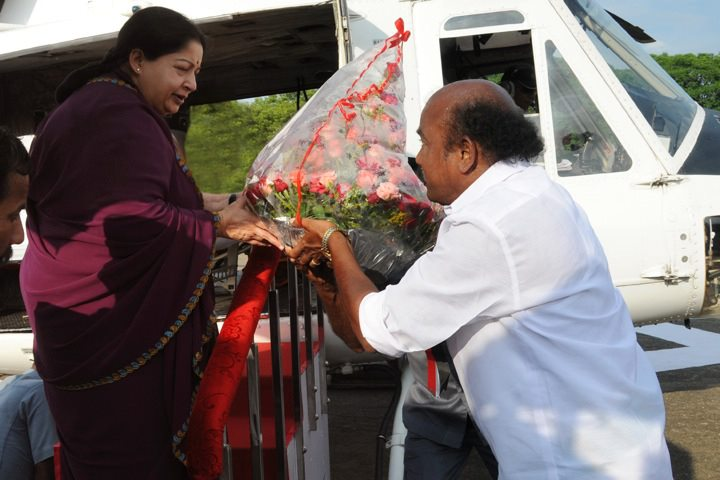

Member of the Tamil Nadu Legislative Assembly
- In office 12 May 2021 – 5 May 2026
- Preceded by: P. Saravanan
- Succeeded by: C. T. R. Nirmal Kumar
- Constituency: Thiruparankundram

Personal details
- Born: 16 August 1949 (age 77) Madurai, Tamil Nadu
- Party: All India Anna Dravida Munnetra Kazhagam
- Other political affiliations: Indian National Congress (J)
- Spouse: Maheshwari Chellappa
- Children: V.V.R. Raj Satyen

V. V. Rajan Chellappa is an Indian Politician and former Mayor of Madurai Corporation and also he is MLA from Thiruparankundram. As a cadre of All India Anna Dravida Munnetra Kazhagam party, he previously served as a member of Rajya Sabha from 1992 - 1998.

Chellappa polled 1,03,683 votes defeating his nearest rival S. K. Ponnuthai of the CPI(M) who secured 74,194 votes for Thiruparankundram Legislative Assembly in April 2021. He contested as Congress (J) candidate in 1980 election.
