= Rajesh Lakhoni =

Indian civil servant

Rajesh B Lakhoni is the CMD of Tamil Nadu Electricity Board and TANGEDCO, and chairman of TANTRANSCO in place of Pankaj Kumar Bansal, changed from the position of Principal Secretary/Commissioner of Archives and Historical Research Department. He was previously the Principal Secretary to Government, Housing and Urban Development Department. An IAS officer who formerly acted as the collector of Theni district and then he was changed to Kanyakumari district to seek good acts for the district after the Tsunami attack. He replaced M P Vijayakumar to take up the position of Corporation Commissioner in Chennai.

He was the chief electoral officer for Tamil Nadu state between 2015 and 2018.
