= S. M. Seenivel =

Indian politician

S. M. Seenivel (died 25 May 2016) was an Indian politician of the All India Anna Dravida Munnetra Kazhagam (AIADMK) party. He was elected as a member of the 15th Tamil Nadu Legislative Assembly from the Thiruparankundram constituency in 2016, having previously been elected to the 13th Assembly from the same constituency in 2001.

Seenivel suffered a stroke on 18 May 2016, one day before the election results were announced. He died in hospital at Madurai, aged 65, on 25 May 2016, a few hours before he was due to be sworn in as a Member of the Legislative Assembly (MLA). Five years earlier, another AIADMK MLA, M. Mariam Pichai, had also died on oath-taking day prior to being sworn in.

Seenivel was survived by his wife, three daughters and a son.
