= Tamil Nadu Kongu Ilaingar Peravai =

Tamil Nadu Kongu Ilaignar Peravai
- Leader: U. Thaniyarasu
- Headquarters: Kongu Arivalayam, 4/127 Palladam Road, Tirupur-641605
- Ideology: Casteism
- Alliance: Secular Progressive Alliance (2026-present); AIADMK-led Alliance (2011-2026); National Democratic Alliance (2019-2023)
- Seats in Tamil Nadu: 0 / 234

Website
- www.thaniyarasu.in

Thaniyarasu Speech

Tamil Nadu Kongu Ilaignar Peravai is a political party (Founded by Thaniyarasu) in the Indian state of Tamil Nadu. The party formed to gain votes in Kongu Vellalar, which holds nearly 15% of the Tamil Nadu electorate.

== Meetings ==
The association conducted a political rally at Namakkal for the 2009 Parliamentary elections with four lakh people taking part.

== Election history ==
Tamil Nadu Kongu Ilaignar Peravai contested 11 parliamentary constituencies in the Lok Sabha election with no alliances.

== Election alliance ==
For the 2011 Tamil Nadu Legislative Assembly election, it joined forces with AIADMK and obtained one seat. Thaniyarasu won the constituency of Paramathi Velur as an AIADMK candidate.

Year	General Election	Votes Polled	Seats Contested	Seats Won	Alliance with
2011	2011 Tamil Nadu Legislative Assembly election	82,682	1	1	All India Anna Dravida Munnetra Kazhagam front

== See also ==
- List of political parties in India
