= M. Rengasamy =

Indian politician

M. Rengasamy is an Indian politician and was elected member for the Tamil Nadu Legislative Assembly from the Thanjavur constituency in 2011, 2016 representing Anna Dravida Munnetra Kazhagam party. Currently he represents the Amma Makkal Munnetra Kazhagam party. He lost the assembly by-elections in 2019.

He was one of the 18 members who were disqualified were disqualified by Speaker P. Dhanapal as they withdrew support to Chief Minister Edappadi K. Palaniswami and became loyal to rebel leader T.T.V. Dhinakaran and joined his party Amma Makkal Munnetra Kazhagam.
