= P. Saravanan =

Indian politician

Joint Secretary of the Tamilaga Vettri Kalagam
- Incumbent
- Assumed office 27 September 2023
- General Secretary: Edappadi K. Palaniswami

Personal details
- Born: Saravanan Tamil Nadu, India
- Party: Tamilaga Vettri Kalagam (since 2026)

P. Saravanan is an Indian politician and an actor. He was a former Member of Legislative Assembly of Tamil Nadu from Thirupparankundram Constituency. He is currently serving as the Joint Secretary of AIADMK State Medical Wing.

== Political career ==
Saravanan started his political career as the Madurai Rural Unit Secretary of the Marumalarchi Dravida Munnetra Kazhagam (MDMK) and later moved to the DMK because he was denied the ticket to contest the polls by MDMK. Saravanan was also a member of the BJP earlier during 2015.

He was then made as the Deputy Leader of Dravida Munnetra Kazhagam Party's Doctor wing. During the by- elections held for Tamil Nadu Legislative assembly on 19 May, he defeated his rival Muniyandi of the AIADMK with a difference of 2936 votes.

Later he joined Bharatiya Janata Party (BJP) on 14 March 2021, upset as the DMK did not give him a seat to contest. Within hours of joining the BJP, Saravanan was allotted the Madurai North constituency. Many cadres of BJP protested stating that the constituency should not be allotted to him and many cadres locked the BJP office at K Pudur as protest. Madurai rural district BJP secretary A Nagarajan said in protest that “It is a very wrong move by party leadership to give ticket to a renowned party defector”. He was made BJP's Madurai district president.

Saravanan visited minister Palanivel Thiagarajan residence on midnight of 13 August 2022 to apologise after BJP members hurled a slipper at the Minister’s car. He told reporters on midnight that he was going to get out of BJP as he did not like BJP's “politics of hatred and religion” and claimed that the BJP was working against the minority people. BJP state president Kuppusamy Annamalai expelled Saravanan for taking an anti-party stance.

He contested the 2024 Indian General Elections on an ADMK ticket and was placed third.
