= Periyakulam Lok Sabha constituency =

Constituency of the Lok Sabha

Coordinates: 10.1°N 77.5°E

Periyakulam
- Former Lok Sabha constituency

Constituency details
- Country: India
- Region: South India
- State: Tamil Nadu
- Established: 1952
- Abolished: 2008
- Reservation: None

Periyakulam was a Lok Sabha constituency in Tamil Nadu. It was absorbed in Theni Lok Sabha constituency after the 2009 election as part of reorganisation of Lok Sabha seats to reflect the change in population over specific geographic areas. Periyakulam Lok Sabha constituency is defunct.

== Assembly segments ==
Periyakulam Lok Sabha constituency was composed of the following assembly segments:

1. Periyakulam (now in Theni after 2009)
2. Theni (defunct)
3. Bodinayakkanur (now in Theni after 2009)
4. Cumbum (now in Theni after 2009)
5. Andipatti (now in Theni after 2009)
6. Sedapatti (defunct)

== Members of the Parliament ==
Year	Winner	Party
1952-57	K. Sakthivadivel Gounder	Indian National Congress
1957-62	R. Narayanaswami	Indian National Congress
1962-67	M. Malaichami Thevar	Indian National Congress
1967-71	H. Ajamal Khan	Swatantra Party
1971-77	S. M. Muhammed Sheriff	Indian union Muslim league
1977-80	S. Ramaswamy	All India Anna Dravida Munnetra Kazhagam
1980-82	Cumbum N. Natarajan	Dravida Munnetra Kazhagam
1982-84	S. T. K. Jakkaiyan	All India Anna Dravida Munnetra Kazhagam
1984-89	P. Selvendran	All India Anna Dravida Munnetra Kazhagam
1989-91	R. Muthiah	All India Anna Dravida Munnetra Kazhagam
1991-96	R. Ramasamy	All India Anna Dravida Munnetra Kazhagam
1996-98	R. Gnanagurusamy	Dravida Munnetra Kazhagam
1998-99	R. Muthiah	All India Anna Dravida Munnetra Kazhagam
1999-04	T.T.V. Dhinakaran	All India Anna Dravida Munnetra Kazhagam
2004-2009	J.M. Aaron Rashid	Indian National Congress

The seat was absorbed in Theni Lok Sabha constituency after 2009 election. So Periyakulum seat has become defunct since then.

== Election results ==
Vote share of Winning candidates
2004	49.51%
1999	45.6%
1998	51.8%
1996	47.6%
1991	61.3%
1989	60.7%
1984	60.9%
1982	50.1%
1980	50.4%
1977	68.3%
1971	42.0%
1967	43.9%
1962	47.2%
1957	50.1%
1952	44.4%

=== 2004 ===
2004 Indian general elections: Periyakulam
Party	Candidate	Votes	%	±%
INC	J. M. Aaron Rashid	346,851	49.51	n/a
AIADMK	T.T.V. Dhinakaran	325,696	46.49	+0.85
Majority		21,155	3.02	−3.86
Turnout		700,603	66.29	+6.93
INC gain from AIADMK		Swing	+49.51	
UPA gain from AIADMK		Swing		

=== General Election 1999 ===
Party	Candidate	Votes	%	±%
AIADMK	T.T.V.Dhinakaran	303,881	45.6%	-6.2%
DMK	P.Selvendran	258,075	38.8%	-1.6%
PT	Mansoor Alikhan	87,429	13.1%	+9.8%
Dhiravida Thelugar Munnetra Kazhagam	P.R.Jeganathan	1,414	0.2%	New
IND	A.Sadayandi	1,327	0.2%	New
IND	C.Rajagopal	1,256	0.2%	New
IND	K.Elamurugan	1,105	0.2%	New
Majority		45,806	6.9%	-4.5%
Turnout		665,824	59.4%	+2.2%
AIADMK Hold				

=== General Election 1998 ===
Party	Candidate	Votes	%	±%
AIADMK	R.Muthaih	319,672	51.8%	+4.2%
DMK	R.Gandhimathy	249,092	40.4%	-7.2%
PT	C.Mookaih	20,219	3.3%	New
IND	P.V.K.Deivendran	5,549	0.9%	New
INC	M.Veeraprakash	4,214	0.7%	New
Majority		70,580	11.4%	-7.7%
Turnout		617,136	57.2%	-10.0%
AIADMK gain from DMK				

=== General Election 1996 ===
Party	Candidate	Votes	%	±%
DMK	R.Gnanagurusamy	326,665	47.6%	+20.6%
AIADMK	R.Ramasamy	195,328	28.5%	-32.8%
MDMK	N. Eramakrishnan	91,601	13.3%	New
BJP	M.Periyasamy Devar	20,035	2.9%	-0.2%
PMK	P.Thangaraj	11,503	1.7%	-4.1%
Majority		131,337	19.1%	-15.2%
Turnout		686,544	67.2%	+5.5%
DMK gain from AIADMK				

=== General Election 1991 ===
Party	Candidate	Votes	%	±%
AIADMK	R.Ramasamy	382,759	61.3%	+0.6%
DMK	Cumbum Ramakrishnan	168,799	27.0%	-0.3%
PMK	K.Madasamy	36,454	5.8%	-3.6%
BJP	Balakrishnan	19,148	3.1%	New
IND	P.Rajangam	1,211	0.2%	New
Majority		213,960	34.3%	+0.9%
Turnout		624,469	61.7%	-3.6%
AIADMK Hold				

=== General Election 1989 ===
Party	Candidate	Votes	%	±%
AIADMK	R.Muthaiah	402,691	60.7%	-0.2%
DMK	A.K.Cumbum Mahindran	181,287	27.3%	-5.9%
PMK	S.Gunasekharan	62,536	9.4%	New
Majority		221,404	33.4%	+5.7%
Turnout		663,502	65.3%	-6.2%
AIADMK Hold				

=== General Election 1984 ===
Party	Candidate	Votes	%	±%
AIADMK	P.Selvendran	348,903	60.9%	+14.4%
DMK	S.Agniraju	190,290	33.2%	-17.2%
IND	K.Palaniswamy	5,376	0.9%	New
IND	K.Surulvelu	5,122	0.9%	New
IND	K.Ayyadurai	2,148	0.4%	New
IND	S.S.Sailani	1,125	0.2%	New
IND	K.Jayamani	837	0.1%	New
IND	A.Rajendran	633	0.1%	New
Majority		158,613	27.7%	+23.8%
Turnout		572,802	71.5%	+2.7%
AIADMK Hold				

=== By-election 1982 ===
Lok Sabha by-election, 1982: Periyakulam
Party	Candidate	Votes	%	±%
AIADMK	S. T. K. Jakkaiyan	252,377	50.1%	
DMK	N. Eramakrishnan	183,117	36.4%	
INC	A.K. Sheik	28,869	5.7%	
CPI	A. Wahab	16,366	3.2%	
Independent	M. Pandian	10,261	2.0%	
Majority		69,260		
Turnout		503,651		
AIADMK gain from DMK		Swing		

=== General Election 1980 ===
Party	Candidate	Votes	%	±%
DMK	Cumbum N.Natarajan	255,204	50.4%	+24.7%
AIADMK	S.Ramasaamy	235,322	46.5%	-21.8%
IND	Surilvelu	6,934	1.4%	+0.4%
Majority		19,882	3.9%	-38.6%
Turnout		506,263	68.8%	-0.5%
DMK gain from AIADMK				

=== General Election 1977 ===
Party	Candidate	Votes	%	±%
AIADMK	S.Ramasamy	328,100	68.3%	New
DMK	Palanivel Rajan	123,708	25.7%	New
IND	K.Andithevar	12,813	2.7%	New
IND	K.Surulivelu	4,808	1.0%	-0.5%
IND	S.Gunasekharan	1,630	0.3%	New
Majority		204,392	42.5%	+32.5%
Turnout		480,718	69.3%	+3.4%
AIADMK gain from IND				

=== General Election 1971 ===
Party	Candidate	Votes	%	±%
IND	S.M.Mohammad Sherief	175,940	42.0%	New
SWA	Ajmalkhan	134,015	32.0%	-11.9%
IND	H.Muthaih	45,066	10.8%	New
IND	S.Alagarsamy Chettiyar	27,371	6.5%	New
IND	K.Surilvelu	6,108	1.5%	New
Majority		41,925	10.0%	+3.4%
Turnout		388,500	65.9%	-9.0%
IND gain from SWA				

=== General Election 1967 ===
Party	Candidate	Votes	%	±%
SWA	H.Ajmalkhan	183,593	43.9%	New
INC	M.Ibrahim	155,972	37.3%	-9.9%
IND	M.Muthaiah	65,329	15.6%	New
Majority		27,621	6.6%	+5.7%
Turnout		404,894	74.9%	+6.7%
SWA gain from INC				

=== General Election 1962 ===
Party	Candidate	Votes	%	±%
INC	Malaichamy Thevar	146,829	47.2%	-2.9%
IND	Muthaiah	143,930	46.3%	New
IND	Ponnusamy	12,357	4.0%	New
Majority		2,899	0.9%	
Turnout		303,116	68.2%	+14.7%
INC Hold				

=== General Election 1957 ===
Party	Candidate	Votes	%	±%
INC	R.Narayanasamy	116,715	50.1%	+5.7%
IND	Muthaiah	64,867	27.8%	New
IND	M.V.Sethu Rao	19,238	8.3%	New
IND	M.K.M.Meeran	16,282	7.0%	New
IND	S.S.Marisamy	15,838	6.8%	New
Majority		51,848		
Turnout		232,940	53.5%	-12.1%
INC Hold				

=== General Election 1952 ===
Party	Candidate	Votes	%	±%
INC	A.Shaktivel gounder	107,875	44.4%	New
Forward Bloc (Marxist group)	C.Raghupathi Thevar	74,991	30.9%	New
KMPP	S.N.K.Sundaram	30,461	12.5%	New
Socialist Party	Velayudha Nair	29,450	12.1%	New
Majority		32,884		
Turnout		242,777	65.6%	New
INC Win (New Seat)				

== See also ==
- Periyakulam
- List of constituencies of the Lok Sabha
