= P. L. A. Jeganathmishra =

Indian politician (born 1976)

P. L. Alagarsamy Jeganathmishra (born 1976) is an Indian politician from Tamil Nadu. He is a member of the Tamil Nadu Legislative Assembly from the Cumbum Assembly constituency in Theni district representing the Tamilaga Vettri Kazhagam.

== Early life and education ==
Jeganathmishra is from Cumbum, Theni district, Tamil Nadu. He is the son of L. Alagarsamy. He runs his own business. He studied B.Sc zoology at A.V.C. College, Mayiladuthurai, Mannampandal but dropped out in 1993. Later, he did Hotel Management and passed the examinations conducted by the National Council for Hotel Management and Catering Technology, New Delhi in 1994. He declared assets worth Rs.55 crore in his affidavit to the Election Commission of India.

== Career ==
Jeganathmishra is a first time MLA, who won the Cumbum Assembly constituency representing the Tamilaga Vettri Kazhagam in the 2026 Tamil Nadu Legislative Assembly election. He polled 85,394 votes and defeated his nearest rival and four time MLA, N. Eramakrishnan of the Dravida Munnetra Kazhagam (DMK), by a margin of 751 votes.
