= G. Sabari Iyngaran =

Indian politician (born 1998)

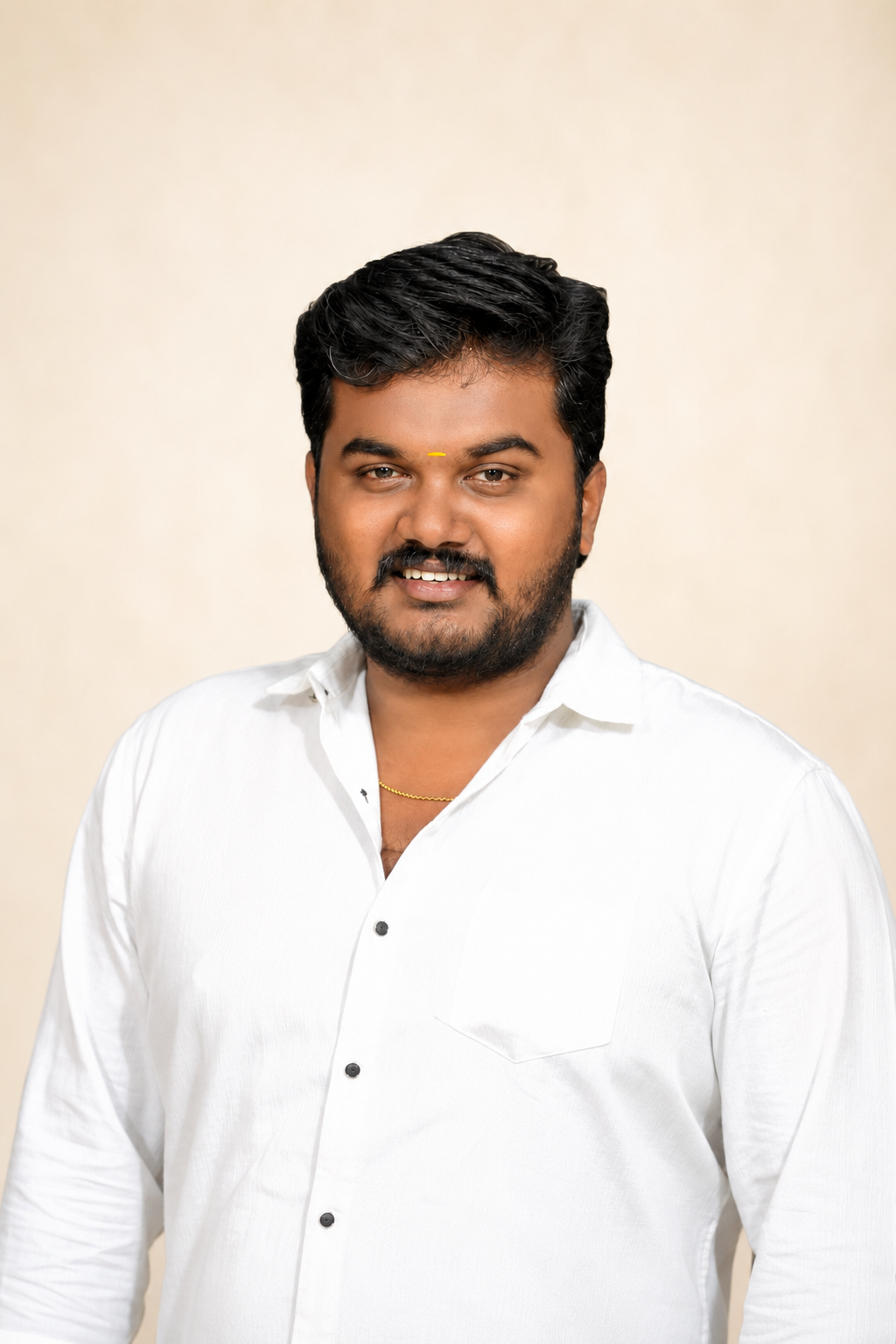
- G. Sabari Iyngaran, Member of the Tamil Nadu Legislative Assembly from Periyakulam constituency

Member of the 17th Tamil Nadu Assembly for Periyakulam
- Incumbent
- Assumed office 5 May 2026
- Preceded by: K._S._Saravana_Kumar

Personal details
- Born: 1998 (age 27–28)
- Party: Tamilaga Vettri Kazhagam
- Education: Bishop Heber College (B.Sc Physics); Government College of Education, Thanjavur (B.Ed.); Gandhigram Rural Institute (M.Sc Physics)
- Occupation: Politician

Ganeshkumar Sabari Iyngaran (born 1998) is an Indian politician from Tamil Nadu. He is a member of the Tamil Nadu Legislative Assembly from Periyakulam Assembly constituency which is reserved for Scheduled Caste community in Theni district representing the Tamilaga Vettri Kazhagam.

== Early life and education ==
Iyngaran is from Periyakulam, Theni district, Tamil Nadu. He is the son of Ganesh Kumar. He did his B.Sc. in physics at Bishop Heber College, Tiruchirapalli in 2017 and completed B.Ed. at Government College of Education, Thanjavur in 2019. He later did his post graduation in M.Sc. physics at Gandhigram University, Dindigul and passed out 2021. He declared assets worth Rs.72 lakhs in his affidavit to the Election Commission of India.

== Career ==
Iyngaran became an MLA on 5 May 2026, winning the 2026 Tamil Nadu Legislative Assembly election from Periyakulam Assembly constituency representing the Tamilaga Vettri Kazhagam. He polled 85,656 votes and defeated his nearest rival, P. Sakthivel of Viduthalai Chiruthaigal Katchi (VCK), by a margin of 19,321 votes.
