= S. Ramaraj =

Indian politician

Member of the Tamil Nadu Legislative Assembly
- In office 2001–2006
- Preceded by: A. Sudalaimuthu
- Succeeded by: S. Lakshmanan
- Constituency: Bodinayakkanur

Personal details
- Born: 24 February 1948 (age 78) Anaimalaiyanpatti, Theni, Tamil Nadu, India
- Party: All India Anna Dravida Munnetra Kazhagam
- Occupation: Farmer

S. Ramaraj is an Indian politician and a former Member of the Legislative Assembly (MLA) of Tamil Nadu. He hails from Anaimalaiyanpatti village in the Theni district. Having studied up to the tenth grade, Ramaraj is a member of the All India Anna Dravida Munnetra Kazhagam (AIADMK) party. He was elected to the Tamil Nadu Legislative Assembly in 2001 after contesting and winning from the Bodinayakkanur Assembly constituency.

== Electoral Performance ==
=== 2001 ===
2001 Tamil Nadu Legislative Assembly election: Bodinayakkanur
Party	Candidate	Votes	%	±%
AIADMK	Ramaraj. S	53,410	49.94%	23.03%
DMK	Sudalaimuthu. A	42,132	39.39%	−11.87%
MDMK	Aroselvan. G	8,439	7.89%	−6.10%
Independent	Rajaram . N	895	0.84%	New
Independent	Ganesan. G	832	0.78%	New
Independent	Mariappan. V. P	400	0.37%	New
Independent	Sekar. V	329	0.31%	New
Independent	Suruli. S	272	0.25%	New
Independent	Karuppiah. P	248	0.23%	New
Margin of victory		11,278	10.54%	−13.82%
Turnout		1,06,957	59.09%	−5.85%
Registered electors		1,81,022		
AIADMK gain from DMK		Swing	-1.33%	
