= K. Kathirkamu =

Indian politician

K. Kathirkamu was an Indian politician and former Member of the Legislative Assembly of Tamil Nadu. He was elected to the Tamil Nadu legislative assembly as an All India Anna Dravida Munnetra Kazhagam candidate from Periyakulam constituency in the 2016.

He was one of the 18 members who were disqualified were disqualified by Speaker P. Dhanapal as they withdrew support to Chief Minister Edappadi K. Palaniswami and became loyal to rebel leader T.T.V. Dhinakaran and joined his party Amma Makkal Munnetra Kazhagam.

== Electoral History ==
2026 Tamil Nadu Legislative Assembly election: Periyakulam
Party	Candidate	Votes	%	±%
TVK	Sabari Iyngaran G	85,656	40.56	New
VCK	Sakthivel P	66,335	31.41	New
AMMK	Dr Kathirkamu K	44,521	21.08	▲12.84
NTK	Vimala R	9,610	4.55	▼1.37
NOTA	NOTA	1,506	0.71	▼0.52
Margin of victory		19,321	9.15	▼1.55
Turnout		2,11,209		
Rejected ballots				
Registered electors		263,547		
TVK gain from DMK		Swing		

2021 Tamil Nadu Legislative Assembly election: Periyakulam
Party	Candidate	Votes	%	±%
DMK	K. S. Saravana Kumar	92,251	46.28	+6.77
AIADMK	M. Murugan	70,930	35.58	−11.36
AMMK	Dr. K. Kathirkamu	16,424	8.24	New
NTK	Vimala	11,794	5.92	+5.37
MNM	S. Pandiyarajan	5,680	2.85	New
NOTA	NOTA	2,451	1.23	+0.05
Margin of victory		21,321	10.70	3.26
Turnout		199,346	69.83	−5.11
Rejected ballots		10	0.01	
Registered electors		285,471		
DMK hold		Swing	-0.66	

2019 Tamil Nadu Legislative Assembly by-elections: Periyakulam
Party	Candidate	Votes	%	±%
DMK	K. S. Saravana Kumar	88,393		
AIADMK	M. Mayilvel	68,073		
AMMK	Dr. K. Kathirkamu	26,338		
NTK	Shobana	5,825		
MNM	Prabhu	5,727		
Majority		20,320		
Turnout		1,96,622	73.98	
Registered electors		2,68,739		
DMK gain from AIADMK		Swing		

2016 Tamil Nadu Legislative Assembly election: Periyakulam
Party	Candidate	Votes	%	±%
AIADMK	Dr. K. Kathirkamu	90,599	46.94	New
DMK	Anbazhagan	76,249	39.51	−4.83
CPI(M)	A. Laser	13,525	7.01	−40.85
BJP	K. Chellam	5,015	2.60	+0.46
NOTA	NOTA	2,275	1.18	New
NTK	M. Pushpalatha	1,048	0.54	New
PMK	R. Kannan	1,025	0.53	New
Margin of victory		14,350	7.43	3.91
Turnout		193,010	74.94	−3.94
Registered electors		257,555		
AIADMK gain from CPI(M)		Swing	-0.92	
