= K. M. S. Subramanian =

Member of the Tamil Nadu Legislative Assembly
- In office 1980–1984
- Preceded by: P. Ramadass
- Succeeded by: K. S. M. Ramachandran
- Constituency: Bodinayakkanur

Personal details
- Born: 15 January 1944 Bodinayakanur, Theni district, Tamil Nadu, India
- Party: All India Anna Dravida Munnetra Kazhagam
- Education: 10th Standard
- Alma mater: Victoria Higher Secondary School, Bodinayakanur
- Occupation: Farmer

K. M. S. Subramanian is an Indian politician and a former Member of the Legislative Assembly (MLA) of Tamil Nadu. He hails from Bodinayakkanur in the Theni district. Having completed his education up to the tenth grade at Victoria Higher Secondary School in Bodinayakanur, Subramanian is a member of the All India Anna Dravida Munnetra Kazhagam (AIADMK) party. He was elected to the Tamil Nadu Legislative Assembly from the Bodinayakkanur Assembly constituency in the 1980 state elections.

== Electoral Performance ==
=== 1980 ===
1980 Tamil Nadu Legislative Assembly election: Bodinayakkanur
Party	Candidate	Votes	%	±%
AIADMK	K. M. S. Subramanian	50,972	59.77%	18.66%
INC	Ramachandran. K. S. M.	34,013	39.89%	11.51%
Independent	Muthiah Pillai. M. R.	290	0.34%	New
Margin of victory		16,959	19.89%	7.15%
Turnout		85,275	65.83%	7.07%
Registered electors		1,31,024		
AIADMK hold		Swing	18.66%	
