= G. Thalapathi =

Indian politician

G. Thalapathi is an Indian Politician and was a Member of the Legislative Assembly of Tamil Nadu. He was elected to the Tamil Nadu legislative assembly as a Dravida Munnetra Kazhagam (DMK) candidate from Sedapatti constituency in the 1996 election. And he contested the 2021 Tamil Nadu Legislative Assembly election from the Madurai North constituency as a DMK candidate.

== Electoral performance ==
=== Tamilnadu Legislative Assembly Elections ===
Elections	Constituency	Party	Result	Vote percentage	Opposition Candidate	Opposition Party	Opposition vote percentage
1996 Tamil Nadu Legislative Assembly election	Sedapatti	DMK	Won	49.69	Sedapatti R. Muthiah	AIADMK	39.33
2006 Tamil Nadu Legislative Assembly election	Sedapatti	DMK	Lost	41.37	C. Durairaj	AIADMK	43.46
2011 Tamil Nadu Legislative Assembly election	Madurai West	DMK	Lost	35.25	Sellur K. Raju	AIADMK	59.64
2016 Tamil Nadu Legislative Assembly election	Madurai West	DMK	Lost	35.91	Sellur K. Raju	AIADMK	44.81
2021 Tamil Nadu Legislative Assembly election	Madurai North	DMK	Won	47.11	P. Saravanan	BJP	44.81
