= J. M. Aaroon Rashid =

Indian politician

J.M. Haroon Rasheed

Member of Parliament, Lok Sabha
- In office 16 May 2009 – 16 May 2014
- Preceded by: constituency established
- Succeeded by: R. Parthipan
- Constituency: Theni
- In office 16 May 2004 – 16 May 2009
- Preceded by: T. T. V. Dhinakaran
- Succeeded by: constituency abolished
- Constituency: Periyakulam

Member of Tamil Nadu Legislative Assembly
- In office 10 May 1996 – 14 May 2001
- Preceded by: E. Kalan
- Succeeded by: D. Napoleon
- Constituency: Villivakkam

Personal details
- Born: 13 May 1950 (age 76) Madras, Madras State, India
- Party: Indian National Congress
- Spouse: Hazarah Beevi
- Children: 2 sons and 2 daughters

J.M. Haroon Rashid (born 13 May 1950) is an Indian politician and former member of the Parliament of India, representing the Theni Lok Sabha constituency. Haaroon Rashid is a leader of Indian National Congress.

== Early life ==
J.M. Haroon Rashid was born in Chennai on 13 May 1950. He attended Intermediate Educated at Sir Thiyagaraja College, Old Washermanpet, Chennai, Tamil Nadu.

== Political career ==
In March 1996, he entered into politics as a Member of Tamil Nadu Legislative Assembly for Villivakam constituency (1996–2001) from Tamil Maanila Congress. In 2001, he floated a new party, Tamizhaga Muslim United Jamaat, and contested along with DMK alliance. Then, he ran for the Lok Sabha seat for Periyakulam constituency in Tamil Nadu, winning and in 2004 to 14th Lok Sabha. He received 346,851 votes (49.51%) and defeated strongman TTV Dhinakaran of ADMK by 2,155 votes in that election.

=== 2009 elections ===
In 2009, Aaroon Rashid once again Indian national congress fielded him in Theni constituency in Tamil Nadu and he got 340,575 and defeated Thanga Tamilselvan of All India Anna Dravida Munnetra Kazhagam.

== Elections contested ==
=== Tamilnadu State Legislative Assembly Elections Contested ===
Elections	Constituency	Party	Result	Vote percentage	Opposition Candidate	Opposition Party	Opposition vote percentage
1996	Villivakkam	TMC(M)	Won	70.24	M. G. Mohan	INC	16.88

=== Lok Sabha elections contested ===
Elections	Constituency	Party	Result	Vote percentage	Opposition Candidate	Opposition Party	Opposition vote percentage
2004	Periyakulam	INC	Won	49.51	T.T.V. Dhinakaran	AIADMK	46.49
2009	Theni	INC	Won	42.54	Thanga Tamil Selvan	AIADMK	41.76
2014	Theni	INC	Lost	23.84	R. Parthipan	AIADMK	53.06

== Positions held ==
=== 2004 ===
- Member, Committee on Energy
- Member, Consultative Committee, Ministry of Commerce and Industry
- Member, Consultative Committee, Ministry of Shipping
- Member, Committee on Government Assurances
- Chairman, Tamil Nadu Haj committee, (2004 - 2009)
- Member, Tamil Nadu Wakf Board, (2004–09)

=== 2006 ===
- Member, Joint Parliamentary Committee on Wakf

=== 2007 ===
- Member, Committee on Energy

=== 2009 ===
- Member, Committee on Health and Family Welfare
- Member, Committee on Official Languages
- Member, Consultative Committee, Ministry of Shipping
- Member, Tamil Nadu Wakf Board (2012–13).

=== 2010 ===
Member, committee on Home Affairs

== See also ==
- K. Kamaraj
- M. G. Ramachandran
- Karunanidhi
- Rahul Gandhi
- Dayanidhi Maran
- E. V. K. S. Elangovan
