= P. Ravindhranath =

Indian politician (born 1980)

P. Ravindhranath Kumar

Member of Parliament, Lok Sabha
- In office 30 May 2019 – 4 June 2024
- Preceded by: R. Parthipan
- Succeeded by: Thanga Tamil Selvan
- Constituency: Theni

Personal details
- Born: 3 February 1980 (age 46) Thenkarai, Tamil Nadu, India
- Party: Dravida Munnetra Kazhagam (since 2026)
- Other political affiliations: AIADMK (till 2022)
- Spouse: Ananthy Ravindhranath Kumar
- Children: R. Jaideep, R. Jayashree and R. Aditya
- Parents: O. Panneerselvam (father); P. Vijayalakshmi (mother)
- Profession: Politician
- Nickname: OPR

Panneerselvam Ravindhranath Kumar (born 3 February 1980), popularly known as P. Ravindhranath or OPR, is an Indian politician who was elected to the Lok Sabha following the 2019 Indian general election representing Theni Lok Sabha constituency in Tamil Nadu as member of the All India Anna Dravida Munnetra Kazhagam until 2024. He is the son of O. Panneerselvam.

== Career ==
=== Member of Parliament ===
P. Ravindhranath was elected to the Lok Sabha, lower house of the Parliament of India from Theni Lok Sabha constituency, Tamil Nadu in the 2019 Indian general election as member of the All India Anna Dravida Munnetra Kazhagam. On 6 July 2023, Madras High Court declared his election as Lok Sabha MP, null and void. Later, revoked it.

=== Election bribing ===
P. Ravindhranath was caught on camera bribing people for votes in a college premises while running for election in Theni Lok Sabha constituency during the 2019 Indian general election. The video shows Ravindhranath and O. Panneerselvam's supporters giving out money in a college premises. The administration of the college seems to have turned a blind eye to these activities and many claimed the bribers had reportedly paid the college's Imam to keep silent. Court cases were filed citing the incident.

=== Expulsion from AIADMK ===
On 14 July 2022, P. Ravindhranath was expelled as primary member of the party along with his younger brother Jaya Pradeep by the AIADMK Interim General Secretary Edappadi K. Palaniswami.
