= N. Eramakrishnan =

Indian politician

Member of the Legislative Assembly, Tamil Nadu Legislative Assembly
- In office 1989–1991
- Preceded by: S. Subburayar
- Succeeded by: O. R. Ramachandran
- Constituency: Cumbum

Member of the Legislative Assembly, Tamil Nadu Legislative Assembly
- In office 2006–2011
- Preceded by: O. R. Ramachandran
- Constituency: Cumbum
- In office 2011–2016
- Succeeded by: S. T. K. Jakkaiyan
- In office 2021–2026
- Preceded by: S. T. K. Jakkaiyan
- Succeeded by: P. L. A. Jeganathmishra

Personal details
- Born: 30 July 1949 Cumbum, Tamil Nadu, India
- Party: DMK
- Education: Pachaiyappa's College, Chennai; Madras Christian College, Tambaram
- Profession: Agriculturalist

N. Eramakrishnan (born 30 July 1949) is an Indian politician and a member of the Tamil Nadu Legislative Assembly from the Cumbum constituency. He represents the Dravida Munnetra Kazhagam (DMK) party and has previously represented the Marumalarchi Dravida Munnetra Kazhagam (MDMK).

N. Eramakrishnan was born on 30 July 1949 in Cumbum. He has a master's degree and is married with two children.

N. Eramakrishnan was first elected to the Tamil Nadu Legislative Assembly from Cumbum in 1989 as a DMK candidate. The seat changed hands in the 1991 elections and it was not until those of 2006 that he was re-elected, this time as a candidate for MDMK. He returned to the DMK and won the seat in a by-election in 2009, followed by success in the 2011 state elections. He lost to S. T. K. Jakkaiyan in 2016. He won the seat back in the 2021 state election.

In April 2012, Eramakrishnan was one of four DMK MLAs suspended from the legislature for ten days after they had staged a walk-out and shouted slogans at the Speaker, D. Jayakumar.

== Elections contested ==
=== Lok Sabha elections ===
Elections	Constituency	Party	Result	Vote percentage	Opposition Candidate	Opposition Party	Opposition vote percentage
1982 By-Election	Periyakulam	DMK	Lost	36.4	S. T. K. Jakkaiyan	AIADMK	50.1
1991 Indian general election	Periyakulam	DMK	Lost	27.0	R.Ramasamy	AIADMK	61.3
1996 Indian general election	Periyakulam	MDMK	Lost	28.5	R.Gnanagurusamy	DMK	47.6

=== Tamilnadu State Legislative Assembly Elections Contested ===
Elections	Constituency	Party	Result	Vote percentage	Opposition Candidate	Opposition Party	Opposition vote percentage
1984	Cumbum	DMK	Lost	46.94	S. Subburayar	AIADMK	52.17
1989	Cumbum	DMK	Won	46.17	Gopalan. R. T. M	AIADMK(J)	32.64
2006	Cumbum	MDMK	Won	43.24	Selvendran P	DMK	41.57
2009 By-Election	Cumbum	DMK	Won	73.64	R. Arun Kumar	DMDK	21.81
2011	Cumbum	DMK	Won	48.58	Murugesan. P	DMDK	41.22
2016	Cumbum	DMK	Lost	41.16	S. T. K. Jakkaiyan	AIADMK	46.94
2021	Cumbum	DMK	Won	51.81	S. P. M. Syed Khan	AIADMK	30.84
