= Cumbum Assembly constituency =

State Legislative Assembly Constituency in Tamil Nadu, India

Coordinates: 9.74°N 77.28°E

Cumbum
- Constituency No. 201 for the Tamil Nadu Legislative Assembly

Constituency details
- Country: India
- Region: South India
- State: Tamil Nadu
- Lok Sabha constituency: Theni
- Established: 1951
- Total electors: 255,888

Member of Legislative Assembly
- 17th Tamil Nadu Legislative Assembly
- Incumbent Jeganathmishra PLA
- Party: TVK
- Elected year: 2026

Cumbum is a state assembly constituency in Theni district in Tamil Nadu, part of Theni Lok Sabha constituency. Elections were not held in 1957 and 1962. It is one of the 234 State Legislative Assembly Constituencies in Tamil Nadu, in India.

== Members of the Legislative Assembly ==
| Year | Member | Political party |
Madras State
| 1952 | P. T. Rajan | Justice Party |
| 1967 | Rajangam | Dravida Munnetra Kazhagam |
Tamil Nadu
| 1971 | K. P. Gopal | Indian National Congress |
| 1977 | R. Chandrasekharan | All India Anna Dravida Munnetra Kazhagam |
| 1980 | R. T. Gopalan | All India Anna Dravida Munnetra Kazhagam |
| 1984 | S. Subburayar | All India Anna Dravida Munnetra Kazhagam |
| 1989 | N. Eramakrishnan | Dravida Munnetra Kazhagam |
| 1991 | O. R. Ramachandran | Indian National Congress |
| 1996 | O. R. Ramachandran | Tamil Maanila Congress |
| 2001 | O. R. Ramachandran | Tamil Maanila Congress |
| 2006 | N. Eramakrishnan | Marumalarchi Dravida Munnetra Kazhagam |
| 2009 | N. Eramakrishnan | Dravida Munnetra Kazhagam |
| 2011 | N. Eramakrishnan | Dravida Munnetra Kazhagam |
| 2016 | S. T. K. Jakkaiyan | All India Anna Dravida Munnetra Kazhagam |
| 2021 | N. Eramakrishnan | Dravida Munnetra Kazhagam |
| 2026 | P. L. A. Jeganathmishra | Tamilaga Vettri Kazhagam |

== Election results ==
Vote share of winning candidates
| 2026 | 40.55% |
| 2021 | 51.81% |
| 2016 | 46.94% |
| 2011 | 48.58% |
| 2009 | 73.64% |
| 2006 | 43.24% |
| 2001 | 50.73% |
| 1996 | 54.66% |
| 1991 | 57.21% |
| 1989 | 46.17% |
| 1984 | 52.17% |
| 1980 | 49.20% |
| 1977 | 41.50% |
| 1971 | 48.87% |
| 1967 | 59.66% |
| 1952 | 42.30% |

=== 2026 ===
2026 Tamil Nadu Legislative Assembly election: Cumbam (Tamil Nadu)
| Party | Candidate | Votes | % | ±% |
|---|---|---|---|---|
| TVK | P. L. A. Jeganathmishra | 85,394 | 40.55 | New |
| DMK | Eramakrishnan N | 84,643 | 40.2 | ▼11.61 |
| AIADMK | Jakkaiyan S T K | 27,307 | 12.97 | ▼17.87 |
| NTK | Anbuselvi A | 9,599 | 4.56 | ▼1.54 |
| NOTA | NOTA | 667 | 0.32 | |
| Margin of victory | | 751 | | |
| Turnout | | 2,10,574 | | |
| Rejected ballots | | | | |
| Registered electors | | 253,646 | | |
| TVK gain from DMK | | Swing | | |

=== 2021 ===
2021 Tamil Nadu Legislative Assembly election: Cumbum
| Party | Candidate | Votes | % | ±% |
|---|---|---|---|---|
| DMK | N. Eramakrishnan | 104,800 | 51.81% | 10.65% |
| AIADMK | S. P. M. Syed Khan | 62,387 | 30.84% | −16.10% |
| AMMK | Suresh. P | 14,536 | 7.19% | New |
| NTK | Anish Fathima. A | 12,347 | 6.10% | 5.53% |
| MNM | Venkidesh. N | 4,647 | 2.30% | New |
| NOTA | Nota | 1,659 | 0.82% | −0.32% |
| Margin of victory | | 42,413 | 20.97% | 15.19% |
| Turnout | | 2,02,275 | 70.17% | −3.66% |
| Registered electors | | 2,88,262 | | |
| DMK gain from AIADMK | | Swing | 4.87% | |

=== 2016 ===
2016 Tamil Nadu Legislative Assembly election: Cumbum
| Party | Candidate | Votes | % | ±% |
|---|---|---|---|---|
| AIADMK | S. T. K. Jakkaiyan | 91,099 | 46.94% | |
| DMK | N. Eramakrishnan | 79,878 | 41.16% | −7.42% |
| TMC(M) | O. R. Ramachandran | 10,149 | 5.23% | New |
| BJP | N. Prabakaran | 3,971 | 2.05% | 0.58% |
| NOTA | None Of The Above | 2,219 | 1.14% | New |
| SDPI | S. M. Rafeeq Ahamed | 1,368 | 0.70% | New |
| NTK | R. Jayapal | 1,105 | 0.57% | New |
| PMK | Pon. Katchikannan | 763 | 0.39% | New |
| Independent | S. K. Mariappan | 733 | 0.38% | New |
| Independent | T. Ponraja | 702 | 0.36% | New |
| Independent | R. Saravanan | 509 | 0.26% | New |
| Margin of victory | | 11,221 | 5.78% | −1.58% |
| Turnout | | 1,94,082 | 73.83% | −2.38% |
| Registered electors | | 2,62,868 | | |
| AIADMK gain from DMK | | Swing | -1.64% | |

=== 2011 ===
2011 Tamil Nadu Legislative Assembly election: Cumbum
| Party | Candidate | Votes | % | ±% |
|---|---|---|---|---|
| DMK | N. Eramakrishnan | 80,307 | 48.58% | 7.00% |
| DMDK | Murugesan. P | 68,139 | 41.22% | 30.69% |
| Independent | Abbas Mandhiri. R | 6,205 | 3.75% | New |
| Independent | Prakash. P | 2,478 | 1.50% | New |
| BJP | Logandurai. P | 2,431 | 1.47% | −0.37% |
| Independent | Murugesan. P | 1,637 | 0.99% | New |
| IJK | Anthony Vedamuthu. A | 980 | 0.59% | New |
| Loktantrik Samajwadi | Rajamohan@Senthil R | 929 | 0.56% | New |
| BSP | Saravanan. V | 840 | 0.51% | 0.08% |
| Independent | Eravichandran. M | 541 | 0.33% | New |
| | Rajmohan. N | 381 | 0.23% | New |
| Margin of victory | | 12,168 | 7.36% | 5.69% |
| Turnout | | 2,16,907 | 76.22% | 5.26% |
| Registered electors | | 1,65,321 | | |
| DMK gain from MDMK | | Swing | 5.34% | |

=== 2009 ===
Tamil Nadu assembly by-election, 2009: Cumbum
| Party | Candidate | Votes | % | ±% |
|---|---|---|---|---|
| DMK | N. Eramakrishnan | 81,515 | 73.64% | |
| DMDK | R. Arun Kumar | 24,142 | 21.81% | |
| Majority | | 57,373 | | |
| Turnout | | 110,700 | 75.99% | |
| DMK gain from MDMK | | Swing | | |

=== 2006 ===
2006 Tamil Nadu Legislative Assembly election: Cumbum
| Party | Candidate | Votes | % | ±% |
|---|---|---|---|---|
| MDMK | N. Eramakrishnan | 50,761 | 43.24% | |
| DMK | Selvendran P | 48,803 | 41.57% | |
| DMDK | Jeganath. A | 12,360 | 10.53% | |
| BJP | Sakthivel A | 2,162 | 1.84% | −44.98% |
| Independent | Vilangumani N | 749 | 0.64% | New |
| AIFB | Senthil Kumar. R | 710 | 0.60% | New |
| Independent | Palanisamy. S | 601 | 0.51% | New |
| BSP | Easwaran S | 506 | 0.43% | New |
| Independent | Ambika. R | 176 | 0.15% | New |
| Independent | Selvaraj. T | 159 | 0.14% | New |
| Independent | Kesavan. V | 148 | 0.13% | New |
| Margin of victory | | 1,958 | 1.67% | −2.25% |
| Turnout | | 1,17,390 | 70.96% | 9.45% |
| Registered electors | | 1,65,427 | | |
| MDMK gain from TMC(M) | | Swing | -7.49% | |

=== 2001 ===
2001 Tamil Nadu Legislative Assembly election: Cumbum
| Party | Candidate | Votes | % | ±% |
|---|---|---|---|---|
| TMC(M) | O. R. Ramachandran | 56,823 | 50.73% | −3.92% |
| BJP | Krishnakumar N. K. R | 52,437 | 46.82% | 43.28% |
| Independent | Selvan U P | 901 | 0.80% | New |
| Independent | Antony Arockiaraj A | 571 | 0.51% | New |
| Puratchi Bharatham | Rajan M | 552 | 0.49% | New |
| Independent | Sivanandan S | 423 | 0.38% | New |
| | Saravanan R | 294 | 0.26% | New |
| Margin of victory | | 4,386 | 3.92% | −29.40% |
| Turnout | | 1,12,001 | 61.51% | −6.46% |
| Registered electors | | 1,82,109 | | |
| TMC(M) hold | | Swing | -3.92% | |

=== 1996 ===
1996 Tamil Nadu Legislative Assembly election: Cumbum
| Party | Candidate | Votes | % | ±% |
|---|---|---|---|---|
| TMC(M) | O. R. Ramachandran | 58,628 | 54.66% | |
| Independent | Gopalan. R. T. | 22,888 | 21.34% | |
| INC | Somasundaram. K. A. | 14,129 | 13.17% | −44.03% |
| CPI(M) | Dharmaraj. S. | 6,872 | 6.41% | |
| BJP | Rajendran. A. | 3,797 | 3.54% | −2.12% |
| Independent | Ahamed Zuber. M. | 253 | 0.24% | New |
| Independent | Ganesan. M. | 128 | 0.12% | New |
| Independent | Murugesan. M. | 122 | 0.11% | New |
| Independent | Kannimuthu. P. | 120 | 0.11% | New |
| Independent | Pandiaraja. G. | 99 | 0.09% | New |
| Independent | Venkatesan. S. | 85 | 0.08% | New |
| Margin of victory | | 35,740 | 33.32% | 9.96% |
| Turnout | | 1,07,265 | 67.97% | 5.18% |
| Registered electors | | 1,64,465 | | |
| TMC(M) gain from INC | | Swing | -2.55% | |

=== 1991 ===
1991 Tamil Nadu Legislative Assembly election: Cumbum
| Party | Candidate | Votes | % | ±% |
|---|---|---|---|---|
| INC | O. R. Ramachandran | 59,263 | 57.21% | 42.43% |
| DMK | P. Eramar | 35,060 | 33.84% | −12.33% |
| BJP | M. Ganakasabapathy | 5,860 | 5.66% | New |
| PMK | A. Saleem Sait | 2,791 | 2.69% | New |
| Independent | T. Krishnamoorthy | 243 | 0.23% | New |
| Independent | K. Kaliappan | 198 | 0.19% | New |
| Independent | K. Abdul Hakkim | 122 | 0.12% | New |
| Independent | B. Pounraj | 59 | 0.06% | New |
| Margin of victory | | 24,203 | 23.36% | 9.84% |
| Turnout | | 1,03,596 | 62.79% | −12.33% |
| Registered electors | | 1,69,718 | | |
| INC gain from DMK | | Swing | 11.04% | |

=== 1989 ===
1989 Tamil Nadu Legislative Assembly election: Cumbum
| Party | Candidate | Votes | % | ±% |
|---|---|---|---|---|
| DMK | N. Eramakrishnan | 52,509 | 46.17% | −0.78% |
| AIADMK | Gopalan. R. T. M | 37,124 | 32.64% | −19.52% |
| INC | Ramasami. O. M | 16,810 | 14.78% | |
| AIADMK | S. P. M. Syed Khan | 6,465 | 5.68% | −46.48% |
| Independent | Saleth. R. M | 673 | 0.59% | New |
| Independent | Surulivelu. K. M | 103 | 0.09% | New |
| Independent | Ziauddin. M. M | 45 | 0.04% | New |
| Margin of victory | | 15,385 | 13.53% | 8.31% |
| Turnout | | 1,13,729 | 75.11% | 0.14% |
| Registered electors | | 1,53,077 | | |
| DMK gain from AIADMK | | Swing | -6.00% | |

=== 1984 ===
1984 Tamil Nadu Legislative Assembly election: Cumbum
| Party | Candidate | Votes | % | ±% |
|---|---|---|---|---|
| AIADMK | S. Subburayar | 52,228 | 52.17% | 2.96% |
| DMK | N. Eramakrishnan | 47,005 | 46.95% | 10.35% |
| Independent | S. Pitchai | 301 | 0.30% | New |
| Independent | M. Gopal | 127 | 0.13% | New |
| Independent | A. M. Ajmab Ibrahim | 125 | 0.12% | New |
| Independent | K. Subburaya | 87 | 0.09% | New |
| Independent | N. Rajendran | 84 | 0.08% | New |
| Independent | S. S. Rajendran | 84 | 0.08% | New |
| Independent | M. S. Ponnusamy | 77 | 0.08% | New |
| Margin of victory | | 5,223 | 5.22% | −7.38% |
| Turnout | | 1,00,118 | 74.97% | 0.58% |
| Registered electors | | 1,36,730 | | |
| AIADMK hold | | Swing | 2.96% | |

=== 1980 ===
1980 Tamil Nadu Legislative Assembly election: Cumbum
| Party | Candidate | Votes | % | ±% |
|---|---|---|---|---|
| AIADMK | Gopalan. R. T. | 47,577 | 49.20% | 7.71% |
| DMK | Cumbum Mahandiran. A. K. | 35,395 | 36.60% | −3.91% |
| Independent | Chandrasekaran. P. K. R | 12,800 | 13.24% | New |
| Independent | Chettiar. M. S. Ponnu | 386 | 0.40% | New |
| Independent | Kamuthurai. S. | 365 | 0.38% | New |
| Independent | Surulivelu. K. | 173 | 0.18% | New |
| Margin of victory | | 12,182 | 12.60% | 11.62% |
| Turnout | | 96,696 | 74.39% | 6.64% |
| Registered electors | | 1,31,390 | | |
| AIADMK hold | | Swing | 7.71% | |

=== 1977 ===
1977 Tamil Nadu Legislative Assembly election: Cumbum
| Party | Candidate | Votes | % | ±% |
|---|---|---|---|---|
| AIADMK | R. Chandrasekharan | 34,902 | 41.50% | |
| DMK | N. Natarajan | 34,080 | 40.52% | −7.39% |
| INC | S. Abdul Kader Marikayer | 11,329 | 13.47% | −35.40% |
| JP | C.K. Jayaprakash | 2,856 | 3.40% | |
| Independent | S.N. Ponnuswamy | 477 | 0.57% | New |
| Independent | K. Surulivelu | 465 | 0.55% | New |
| Margin of victory | | 822 | 0.98% | 0.02% |
| Turnout | | 84,109 | 67.75% | −8.51% |
| Registered electors | | 1,25,579 | | |
| AIADMK gain from INC | | Swing | -7.37% | |

=== 1971 ===
1971 Tamil Nadu Legislative Assembly election: Cumbum
| Party | Candidate | Votes | % | ±% |
|---|---|---|---|---|
| INC | Gopal K. P. | 34,483 | 48.87% | 8.53% |
| DMK | Chellathurai P. S. | 33,806 | 47.91% | −11.75% |
| CPI(M) | Hussain Meer P. | 2,273 | 3.22% | |
| Margin of victory | | 677 | 0.96% | −18.35% |
| Turnout | | 70,562 | 76.26% | −2.87% |
| Registered electors | | 99,318 | | |
| INC gain from DMK | | Swing | -10.79% | |

=== 1967 ===
1967 Madras Legislative Assembly election: Cumbum
| Party | Candidate | Votes | % | ±% |
|---|---|---|---|---|
| DMK | Rajangam | 41,440 | 59.66% | |
| INC | N. S. K. S. Pandiaraj | 28,025 | 40.34% | |
| Margin of victory | | 13,415 | 19.31% | |
| Turnout | | 69,465 | 79.13% | |
| Registered electors | | 89,912 | | |
| DMK gain from Justice Party | | Swing | | |

=== 1952 ===
1952 Madras Legislative Assembly election: Cumbum
| Party | Candidate | Votes | % | ±% |
|---|---|---|---|---|
| Justice Party | P. T. Rajan | 24,140 | 42.30% | |
| INC | Ahmed Meeran S. K. M | 12,781 | 22.40% | 22.40% |
| Independent | Kottaisami Thevar | 9,680 | 16.96% | New |
| CPI | Jamal Mohideen | 8,101 | 14.20% | New |
| Socialist Party (India) | Vellaichamy | 803 | 1.41% | New |
| Margin of victory | | 1,672 | 2.93% | |
| Turnout | | 57,067 | 66.50% | |
| Registered electors | | 85,818 | | |
| Justice Party win (new seat) | | | | |
