= Sedapatti R. Muthiah =

Indian politician (1945–2022)

Sedapatti R. Muthaiah
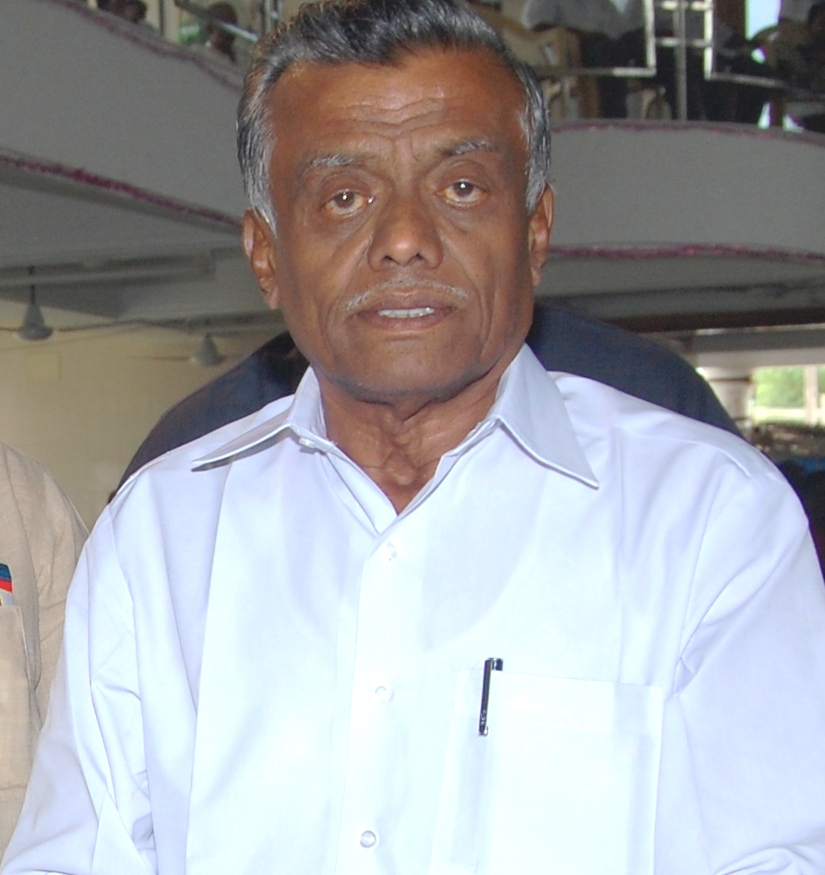

Union Minister for Surface Transport
- In office 19 March 1998 – 8 April 1998
- Preceded by: T. G. Venkatraman
- Succeeded by: M. Thambidurai

Member of Parliament (Lok Sabha) for Periyakulam
- In office 10 March 1998 – 26 April 1999
- Preceded by: R. Gnanagurusamy
- Succeeded by: T. T. V. Dhinakaran

8th Speaker of the Tamil Nadu Legislative Assembly
- In office 3 July 1991 – 21 May 1996
- Deputy: K. Ponnuswamy; S. Gandhirajan
- Preceded by: M. Tamilkudimagan
- Succeeded by: P. T. R. Palanivel Rajan

Member of Parliament (Lok Sabha) for Periyakulam
- In office 1989–1991
- Preceded by: P. Selvendran
- Succeeded by: R. Ramasamy

Member of the Tamil Nadu Legislative Assembly
- In office 1977–1989

Personal details
- Born: 4 October 1945 Muthappanpatti, Madras Presidency, British India
- Died: 21 September 2022 (aged 76) Madurai, Tamil Nadu, India
- Party: Dravida Munnetra Kazhagam
- Other political affiliations: All India Anna Dravida Munnetra Kazhagam (1972 - 2000)

Sedapatti R. Muthiah (4 October 1945 – 21 September 2022) was an Indian politician of the Dravida Munnetra Kazhagam. He was one of the leaders of the All India Anna Dravida Munnetra Kazhagam (AIADMK) from its creation and was second in command in AIADMK until 1998. He was popularly known by the name Sedapattiar. He remained a popular politician in Madurai district and had a mass support base in T.Kallupatti Union.

== Early life and background ==
Muthiah was born in the small village of Muthappanpatti 5 km from T. Kallupatti. He was a post-graduate (M.Sc.) in Mathematics with Distinction from Thiyagarajar College, Madurai. Muthiah wanted to pursue Engineering after his PUC. He was eagerly involved in political activities from his childhood days itself.

== Early political life ==
R. Muthiah entered politics as Student Leader in Dravida Munnetra Kazhagam (DMK) in the early days of Dravidian Movement. He took part in the anti-Hindi agitations. He was also a good orator in Tamil. When M.G.R. started AIADMK a lot of his supporters left DMK and joined AIADMK. Muthiah along with his supporters joined as well given the fact that M.G.R. had a major support in Madurai Region. In fact Muthiah was the first choice of M.G.R. to contest from Dindidul constituency for the party's first election campaign since its inception in 1973.

== State politics ==
Muthiah was chosen to stand from Sedapatti constituency under which hometown comes based on the support he had as a Student Leader in 1977. He won the elections and got elected to the Legislative Assembly. He went on to win consecutive elections from Sedapatti. He was made the Speaker of the Assembly in 1991 and continued his tenure till 1996. Due to his continued victory in all elections he became a household name of the region and hence was fondly called as "Sedappattiyar" by people of the area, which later became his name. During his time T.Kallupatti transitioned itself from a sleepy small village into a Town Panchayat administering 42 villages.

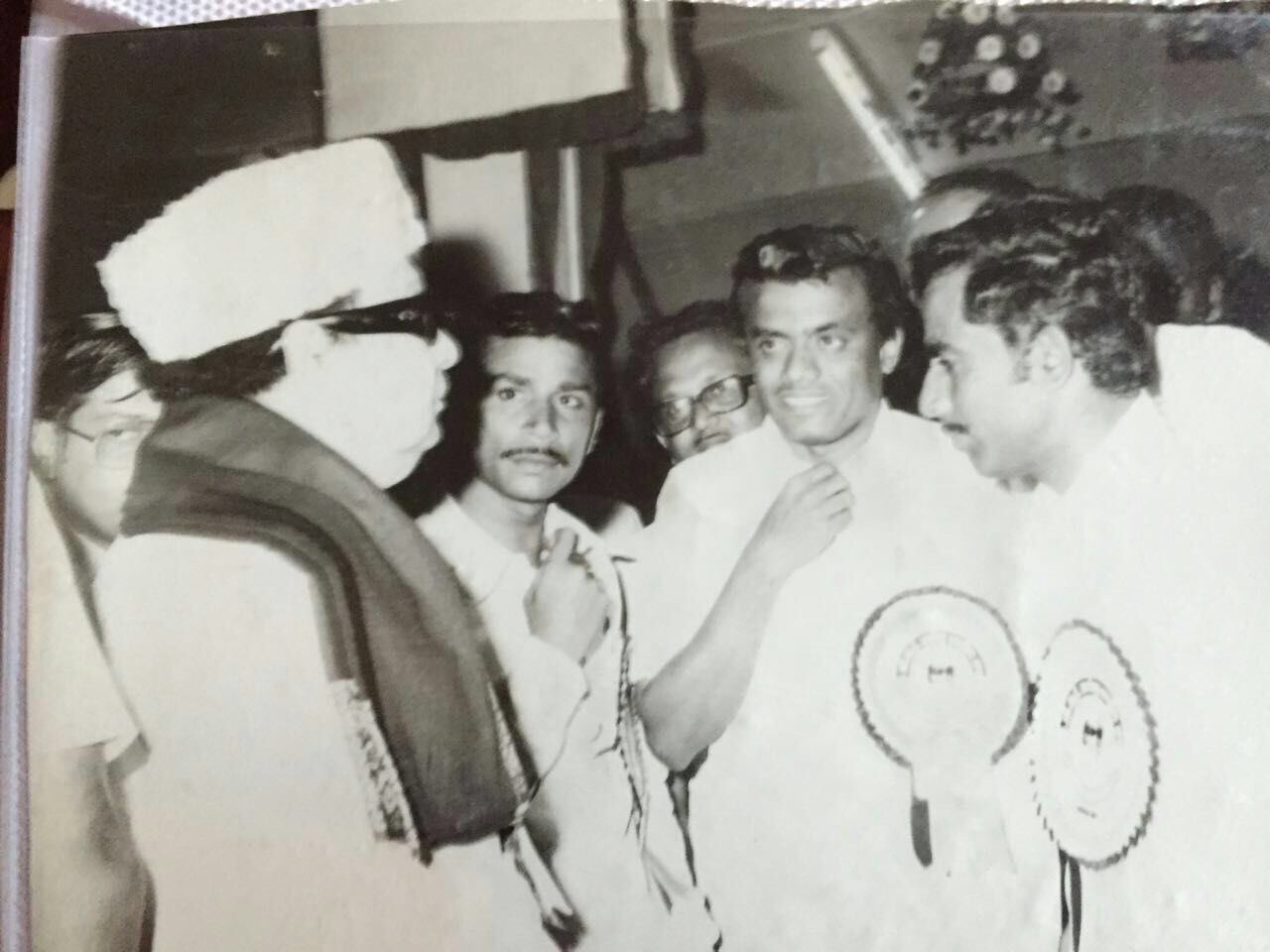
Sedpatti Muthiah with M.G.Ramachandiran

== National politics ==
He was elected as a Member of Parliament twice from Periyakulam Constituency for Ninth Lok Sabha and Twelfth Lok Sabha. In the Twelfth Lok Sabha he served as a Union Minister for Surface Transport in Atal Bihari Vajpayee cabinet. He was in the post for a short period of time and had to resign due to a case in Chennai court. He graciously resigned from the post and faced the charges. Political critics say DMK was behind the case. His resignation is a rare occurrence comparing the scams of recent years of very large proportion. He then served as Leader of AIADMK in the parliament and raised issues concerning people.

=== Turning point ===
During the Twelfth Lok Sabha Vajpayee called for a Vote of Confidence after AIADMK had withdrawn support to the government. In the end Vajpayee lost the Vote of Confidence by 1 vote, the Opposition had polled 270 votes and the BJP 269. He had to vote "against" the Confidence Motion as directed by AIADMK. But because of a Technical Error instead of No the machine displayed Abstained. The voting machine showed that Mr. Muthiah abstained from voting. The technical issue was acknowledged by the Parliament Team but the same was not rectified by them at that time. This led the AIADMK leader to think Muthiah plotted to save the Vajpayee Government and expelled him from the party. Political critics were surprised at how the technical error led to the fall of a soft-spoken veteran politician. The Counter Thoughts of a Parliamentary Official, written by Ramanujam Kodhandaraman, former Cabinet Deputy Secretary and former Goa State Secretary, describes what happened during the No Motion of Confidence in 12th Lok Sabha.

=== Post AIADMK ===
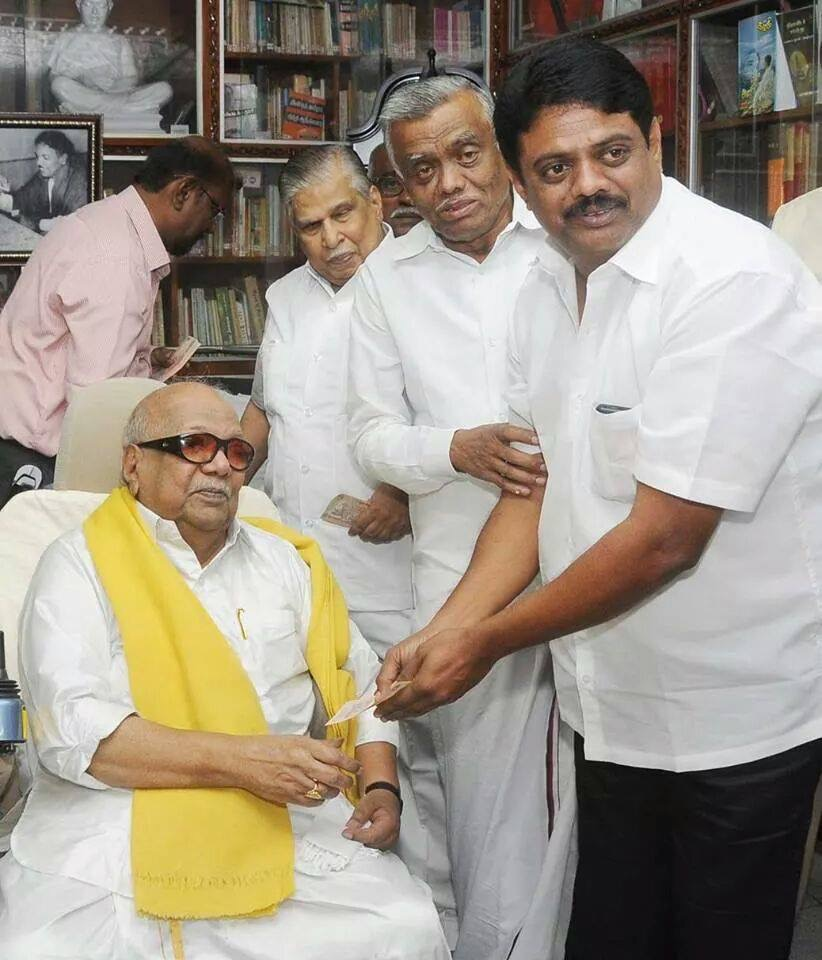
Sedapatti Muthiah and his son Manimaran with Kalaingar Karunanidhi

Muthiah was shocked along with the lakhs of supporters on the news of his dismissal. He reacted saying it's Sasikala who is responsible for the issues. In 2001 elections he fielded his wife Mrs. Shakunthala and got a sizable number of votes almost denting most of AIADMK votes. He stayed away from politics for some time and then joined DMK in 2006 and he became one of the office bearers of the DMK Electoral wing. Large number of his supporters from T. Kallupatti Union joined DMK which has enabled a major mobilisation of votes for DMK during the Parliamentary elections. He was actively involved in all political events. He proved his power in his younger son's marriage which was presided over by M. Karunanidhi, then Chief Minister of Tamil Nadu.

== Electoral performance ==
=== Tamilnadu Legislative Assembly Elections ===
Elections	Constituency	Party	Result	Vote percentage	Opposition Candidate	Opposition Party	Opposition vote percentage
1977 Tamil Nadu Legislative Assembly election	Sedapatti	AIADMK	Won	43.52	A. R. P. Alagarsamy	INC	26.41
1980 Tamil Nadu Legislative Assembly election	Sedapatti	AIADMK	Won	59.87	R. S. Thangarasan	DMK	26.41
1984 Tamil Nadu Legislative Assembly election	Sedapatti	AIADMK	Won	47.29	N. S. Selvaraj	INC	41.20
1989 Tamil Nadu Legislative Assembly election	Sedapatti	AIADMK	Lost	24.56	A. Athiyaman	DMK	31.57
1991 Tamil Nadu Legislative Assembly election	Sedapatti	AIADMK	Won	58.85	A. Athiyaman	DMK	31.49
1996 Tamil Nadu Legislative Assembly election	Sedapatti	AIADMK	Lost	39.33	G. Thalapathi	DMK	49.69

=== Lok Sabha Elections ===
Elections	Constituency	Party	Result	Vote percentage	Opposition Candidate	Opposition Party	Opposition vote percentage
1989 Indian general election	Periyakulam	AIADMK	Won	60.7	A.K.Cumbum Mahindran	DMK	27.3
1998 Indian general election	Periyakulam	AIADMK	Won	51.8	R.Gandhimathy	DMK	40.4

== Personal life ==
Sedapatti M. Manimaran, younger son of Sedapatti Muthiah is currently the Secretary of Madurai South District, DMK party. Sedapatti Muthiah's popularity and Manimaran's recent performance along with the larger families in nearby villages and Mukkulathor community has gained him fame. He also contested from Thirumangalam constituency in 2026 State Elections and won.

Sedapatti Muthiah died in Madurai on 21 September 2022, at the age of 76.

Preceded by P. Selvendran	Member of Indian Parliament (Lok Sabha) for Periyakulam; 1989-1991	Succeeded by R. Ramasamy
Preceded by M. Tamilkudimagan	Speaker of the Tamil Nadu Legislative Assembly; 1991-1996	Succeeded by P. T. R. Palanivel Rajan
Preceded by R. Gnanagurusamy	Member of Indian Parliament (Lok Sabha) for Periyakulam; 1998-1999	Succeeded by T. T. V. Dhinakaran
