= K. M. M. Metha =

Indian politician

Member of the Madras State Legislative Assembly
- In office 1967–1971
- Preceded by: P.K. Mookiah Thevar
- Constituency: Periyakulam

Chairman Of Periyakulam Municipality
- In office 1969–1975

Personal details
- Born: 23 June 1926 Periyakulam
- Died: 24 January 2013 (aged 86)
- Party: Dravida Munnetra Kazhagam
- Other political affiliations: Dravidar Kazhagam
- Spouse: Sabiraammal

K. M. M. Metha was an Indian politician who served as a Member of the Legislative Assembly of Tamil Nadu. He was elected to the Tamil Nadu legislative assembly as a Dravida Munnetra Kazhagam candidate from Periyakulam constituency in the [[1967 Madras Legislative Assembly election later he moved to Kodaikanal with his family, and even during his struggle during the MISA period he focused on his political party more than his family which was taken care of his eldest son in his youngest age with 5 sisters and 2 brothers and his mother Mrs.metha, THE 1st Son Of Mr.metha - mr.Abdul Saleem -the lion|1967 elections]].
