= L. Mookiah =

Indian politician

L. Mookiah, also spelled L. Mookaiah, was an Indian politician and Member of the Legislative Assembly of Tamil Nadu. He was elected to the Tamil Nadu legislative assembly as a Dravida Munnetra Kazhagam candidate from Periyakulam constituency in the 1989 and 1996 elections.

== Electoral performance ==
Election	Constituency	Political party	Result	Vote %	Opposition			Ref
Election	Constituency	Political party	Result	Vote %	Candidate	Political party	Vote %	Ref
1989	Periyakulam	DMK	Won	34.15%	S. Sheik Abdul Khadar	INC	28.73%	
1996	Periyakulam	DMK	Won	46.75%	K. M. Kader Mohideen	AIADMK	27.58%	
2006	Periyakulam	DMK	Lost	38.98%	O. Panneerselvam	AIADMK	49.78%	
2011	Andipatti	DMK	Lost	41.42%	Thanga Tamil Selvan	AIADMK	53.75%	
2016	Andipatti	DMK	Lost	36.72%	Thanga Tamil Selvan	AIADMK	51.93%	
