= Madurai North Assembly constituency =

One of the 234 State Legislative Assembly Constituencies in Tamil Nadu, in India

Coordinates: 9°56′07″N 78°05′17″E

Madurai (North)
- Constituency No. 191 for the Tamil Nadu Legislative Assembly

Constituency details
- Country: India
- Region: South India
- State: Tamil Nadu
- District: Madurai
- Lok Sabha constituency: Madurai
- Established: 1951
- Total electors: 2,21,326
- Reservation: None

Member of Legislative Assembly
- 17th Tamil Nadu Legislative Assembly
- Incumbent A. Kallanai
- Party: TVK
- Elected year: 2026

Madurai North is a legislative assembly constituency in the Indian state of Tamil Nadu. It is one of the 234 State Legislative Assembly Constituencies in Tamil Nadu, in India.

Elections and winners from this constituency are listed below.

== Extent of Assembly constituency ==
- Madurai South Taluk (part)
- Madurai (M Corp.) Ward No.2 to 8, 11 to 15 and 17 to 20
- Madurai North Taluk (part)
- Melamadai (CT)

== Members of Legislative Assembly ==
Year	Winner	Party
2011	A. K. Bose	All India Anna Dravida Munnetra Kazhagam
2016	V. V. Rajan Chellappa	All India Anna Dravida Munnetra Kazhagam
2021	G. Thalapathi	Dravida Munnetra Kazhagam
2026	A. Kallanai	Tamilaga Vettri Kazhagam

== Election results ==
Vote share of winning candidates
2026	45.03%
2021	47.11%
2016	45.64%
2011	63.62%
1952	37.57%

=== 2026 ===
2026 Tamil Nadu Legislative Assembly election: Madurai (North)
Party	Candidate	Votes	%	±%
TVK	A. Kallanai	72,853	45.03	New
DMK	G. Thalapathi	54,815	33.88	▼13.23
AIADMK	P. Saravanan	24,982	15.44	New
NOTA	Nota	753	0.47	▼0.54
Independent	D. Mohamed Ismail	164	0.10	New
Naam Indiar Party	R. Rajkumar	138	0.09	New
Independent	A. Rajangam	135	0.08	New
Independent	M. P. Sankarapandi	122	0.08	▼0.03
SUCI(C)	M. J. Voltaire	122	0.08	New
Independent	P. Muthusamy	101	0.06	New
Independent	C. Sathishkumar	94	0.06	New
Independent	J. Kesavarajah	82	0.05	New
Independent	N. Kuppusamy	25	0.02	New
Margin of victory		18,038	11.15	▼3.64
Turnout		1,61,801	73.11	▲9.44
Registered electors		2,21,326		▼22,098
TVK gain from DMK		Swing	▲45.03	

=== 2021 ===
2021 Tamil Nadu Legislative Assembly election: Madurai (North)
Party	Candidate	Votes	%	±%
DMK	G. Thalapathi	73,010	47.11%	New
BJP	P. Saravanan	50,094	32.32%	New
MNM	M. Alagar	12,102	7.81%	New
AMMK	M. Jeyapal	3,280	2.12%	New
NOTA	Nota	1,564	1.01%	−1.24
Independent	R. Natarajan	168	0.11%	New
Independent	P. Sankarapandi	163	0.11%	New
Independent	J. Abubakkar Sithick	139	0.09%	New
Independent	K. Theivammal	125	0.08%	New
Margin of victory		22,916	14.79%	2.58%
Turnout		154,992	63.67%	−2.54%
Rejected ballots		304	0.20%	
Registered electors		243,424		
DMK gain from AIADMK		Swing	1.46%	

=== 2016 ===
2016 Tamil Nadu Legislative Assembly election: Madurai (North)
Party	Candidate	Votes	%	±%
AIADMK	V. V. Rajan Chellappa	70,460	45.64%	−17.98
INC	V. Karthikeyan	51,621	33.44%	+2.36
DMDK	S. Mujupur Rahuman	17,732	11.49%	New
NOTA	None Of The Above	3,479	2.25%	New
PMK	R. Aasai Kumar	2,039	1.32%	New
IJK	B. Anand	1,339	0.87%	New
Gandhiya Makkal Iyakkam	R. Thiruchenthuran	892	0.58%	New
AIFB	P. Bhagavathy	641	0.42%	New
Independent	I. Abdul Sukkur	422	0.27%	New
Independent	P. Murugan	351	0.23%	New
Margin of victory		18,839	12.20%	−20.34%
Turnout		154,368	66.22%	−6.65%
Registered electors		233,129		
AIADMK hold		Swing	-17.98%	

=== 2011 ===
2011 Tamil Nadu Legislative Assembly election: Madurai (North)
Party	Candidate	Votes	%	±%
AIADMK	A. K. Bose	90,706	63.62%	New
INC	K. S. K. Rajendran	44,306	31.08%	New
BJP	M. Kumaralingam	3,505	2.46%	New
IJK	S. Senthilkumar	1,148	0.81%	New
Independent	S. Jeyachandran	780	0.55%	New
Independent	S. Chandrasekaran	755	0.53%	New
Margin of victory		46,400	32.55%	
Turnout		195,659	72.87%	
Registered electors		142,571		
AIADMK win (new seat)				

=== 1952 ===
1952 Madras Legislative Assembly election: Madurai (North)
Party	Candidate	Votes	%	±%
CPI	P. Ramamurthi	16,337	37.57%	New
INC	T. Chidambara Bharathi	13,005	29.91%	New
Justice Party	P. T. Rajan	4,939	11.36%	New
Independent	G. Ramanujam	4,154	9.55%	New
Independent	S. R. Varadarajulu Naidu	3,562	8.19%	New
Independent	S.V. Ramalingam	784	1.80%	New
Independent	Muthumalai Pillai	699	1.61%	New
Margin of victory		3,332	7.66%	
Turnout		43,480	63.89%	
Registered electors		68,059		
CPI win (new seat)				
