= Cumbum, Tamil Nadu =

Kambam Kambam Pallathakku (Valley), Kambam
- Town
- Nicknames: Grape valley of South India, Centron
- Kambam, Tamil Nadu, India
- Coordinates: 9°44′26.771″N 77°16′58.085″E
- Country: India
- State: Tamil Nadu
- District: Theni
- Zone: Madurai
- Established: 1958

Government
  - Type: First Grade Municipality
  - Body: Cumbum Municipality

Area
  - Total: 6.58 km^{2} (2.54 sq mi)
- Elevation: 462 m (1,516 ft)

Population (2011)
  - Total: 68,090
  - Density: 10,300/km^{2} (26,800/sq mi)

Languages
  - Official: Tamil
- Time zone: UTC+5:30 (IST)
- PIN: 625516
- Telephone code: +914554
- Vehicle registration: TN 60

Kambam, natively enunciated as Kambam (Note: Cumbum is the anglicized spelling used in British English, and kambam is the romanized spelling from Tamil script used in Indian English.), is a town in the Theni district of the state of Tamil Nadu in India. The town is nicknamed the "Grape valley of South India".

== Geography and Climate ==
Kambam is located at 9.73°N 77.3°E. It has an average elevation of 391meters (1282 feet). One can see the backdrop of Kodaikanal Hills from Cumbum. Apart from that Cumbum has most vigorous activity in agriculture.

Kambam Municipality (First Grade) is located in the Theni District of Tamil Nadu, near the Kerala State border. Geographically, it is situated between 9°30′N and 10°11′N latitude and between 77°E and 77°30′E longitude. It ranks as the third-largest town in the Theni district, following Theni itself. The region's soil primarily consists of red soil, and Agriculture plays a vital role for its developmental activities. Crops like Paddy, Coconut, Black Grapes, Groundnut and various kinds of fruits and vegetables are being cultivated in this area.

Cumbum boasts numerous places of worship, including Sri Kambaraya Perumal Kovil, Kasi Viswanathar Kovil (Sri Kambaraya Perumal Kovil Devasthanam), Sri. Gowmariyamman Kovil, Sri NandhaGopalan Kovil, Sri Suruli Vellappar Kovil, Sri Vasavi Ambal Kovil, Sri Ayyappan Kovil, Sri Ranganathar Kovil, Mosques, churches are situated. Sri Samandi Amman Temple is situated near village Samandipuram (Swamindipuram) which is 5 km by road, we can reach by car, Auto's and Buses. The town is well connected by the district roads with nearby urban and rural towns and villages but not connected by Railways. Average maximum temperatures are 41.6 °C and 31.6 °C respectively. The average annual rainfall is around 836 mm with the town getting its share of rainfall during the Southwest Monsoon.

The major source of water for drinking and agriculture comes from the Mullai Periyar River which flows Diverted from the state of Kerala. Suruli Falls which is 10 km from Cumbum, is surrounded by mountains. The nearest airport is Madurai Airport which is 115 km by road and Cochin International Airport (Kerala) which is 175 km by road. The nearest railway station is Teni Railway station which is 40 km by road and Bodinayakkanur railway station which is also 40 km by road. Thekkady (Periyar Wildlife Sanctuary Kerala) which is a tourist destination in Kerala state, is 30 km from Cumbum, near Kumily which is a border town between the states of Tamil Nadu and Kerala.

Cumbum is a valley, surrounded by hills. The eastern side of the hills constituting seven dams on the hills. In the South, the famous tourist attraction, "Thekkady" is situated Kerala. Cumbum is famous for its coconut, Black Grapes & cardamom trading market.

Climate data for Cumbum, Tamil Nadu
Month	Jan	Feb	Mar	Apr	May	Jun	Jul	Aug	Sep	Oct	Nov	Dec	Year
Mean daily maximum °C (°F)	29.1 (84.4)	30.7 (87.3)	32.5 (90.5)	32.8 (91.0)	32.7 (90.9)	31.0 (87.8)	29.9 (85.8)	30.1 (86.2)	30.4 (86.7)	29.6 (85.3)	28.5 (83.3)	28.4 (83.1)	30.5 (86.9)
Mean daily minimum °C (°F)	19.7 (67.5)	20.5 (68.9)	22.1 (71.8)	23.3 (73.9)	23.8 (74.8)	23.2 (73.8)	22.6 (72.7)	22.5 (72.5)	22.3 (72.1)	22.0 (71.6)	21.3 (70.3)	20.1 (68.2)	22.0 (71.5)
Average precipitation mm (inches)	22 (0.9)	30 (1.2)	55 (2.2)	108 (4.3)	113 (4.4)	139 (5.5)	181 (7.1)	123 (4.8)	117 (4.6)	241 (9.5)	175 (6.9)	71 (2.8)	1,375 (54.2)
Source: Climate-Data.org

== History ==
The name Cumbum is derived from Cumbaraya Perumal, the temple around which the town has been built. An article in the newspaper Dinamalar recounted the temple's origins:

"A king ruling this region then desired to build a temple for Lord Shiva and Lord Vishnu in a single premises, Perumal appeared in his dream and said that there was a stone post at the foot hills of western ghats and that His idol was there. The king found Perumal there and installed Him here. As the Lord was found under a stone post (Cumbam), He was named Kambaraya Perumal and the place Cumbum. He also brought a Sivalinga from Kasi-Varanasi and built the Shiva temple. He celebrated the consecration of the temples the same day. The Holy tree Vanni(வன்னி மரம்) is worshipped as Lord Brahma. People thus have the opportunity of worshipping Lords Shiva, Vishnu and Brahma in a single temple premises."

During the British period, after the enactment of the Criminal Tribes Act, several settlements were created by the government. Members belonging to the notified communities were forced to remove to the Cumbum area.

The people of Cumbum and nearby villages played a vital role in the construction of Mullai Periyar Dam. When John Pennycuick decided to divert the west-flowing Periyar River eastward so that it could irrigate acres of dry land, the construction works were disrupted by relentless rain. Large numbers of sand bags kept for the construction of the dam were destroyed due to flooding. Since he could not get adequate funds from the British government, Pennycuick went to England and sold his property to raise the money. Local landowners in Cumbum and Gudalur provided more money, along with manpower, to aid in the dam's construction. It was completed in 1895.

=== Indian independence movement ===
The Hindu quotes, "Peer Mohammad was popularly known as Cumbum Pavalar. Born in 1888, Peer Mohammad was posted as Sub-Inspector of Police in Andipatti The Non-Cooperation Movement launched by Gandhiji in 1920 inspired Peer Mohammad. As a result, he resigned the police job. Inspired by the Gandhian ideals, he published a work entitled Gandhi Maaligai. The foreword to the book was written by Periyar E.V.R. This work of Peer Mohammad highlighted the importance and greatness of Gandhian principles. The Gandhi Maaligai contained songs on Hindu-Muslim unity and the Congress movement. Further, there were songs on Hakim Ajmal Khan, Pandit Motilal Nehru, C. R. Das, C. Rajagopalachari, Periyar E.V.R and Mattaparai Venkatramaier. Peer Mohammad’s songs on nationalists became very popular. His another work, Paa Manchari, contained songs on nationalists. He also established a reading room near the Cumbum Municipal Office."

== Demographics ==
Religious census
Religion	Percent(%)
Hindu	78.6%
Muslim	19.05%
Christian	2.26%
Buddhist	0.01%
Other	0.07%
No religion	0.01%

According to 2011 census, Cumbum had a population of 68,090 with a sex-ratio of 1,012 females for every 1,000 males, much above the national average of 929. A total of 6,661 were under the age of six, constituting 5,417 males and 5,344 females. Scheduled Castes and Scheduled Tribes accounted for 7.76% and .02% of the population respectively. The average literacy of the town was 86.55%, compared to the national average of 72.99%. The town had a total of 118567 households. There were a total of 26,623 workers, comprising 666 cultivators, 11,596 main agricultural labourers, 634 in household industries, 11,921 other workers, 1,806 marginal workers, 12 marginal cultivators, 1,110 marginal agricultural labourers, 62 marginal workers in household industries and 622 other marginal workers.

As per the religious census of 2011, Kambam had 78.6% Hindus, 19.05% Muslims, 2.26% Christians, 0.01% Buddhists, 0.07% following other religions and 0.01% following no religion or did not indicate any religious preference.

== Politics ==
Cumbum (state assembly constituency) is part of Theni (Lok Sabha constituency). N. Eramakrishnan from the Dravida Munnetra Kazhagam party was the MLA elected in the 2021 Tamil Nadu Legislative Assembly election. He was elected five times.
