= Thanga Tamil Selvan =

Indian politician

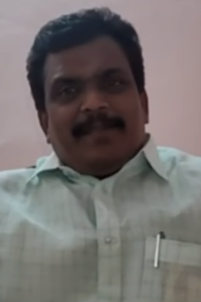

Member of Parliament, Lok Sabha
- Incumbent
- Assumed office 4 June 2024
- Preceded by: P. Ravindhranath
- Constituency: Theni

Member of the Tamil Nadu Legislative Assembly
- In office 14 May 2001 – 2002
- Constituency: Andipatti
- In office 14 May 2011 – 2019
- Constituency: Andipatti

Member of Parliament, Rajya Sabha
- In office 3 April 2002 – 2 April 2008
- Constituency: Tamilnadu

Personal details
- Born: Thanga Tamil Selvan; October 3, 1961 (age 64) Narayanathevanpatti, Theni
- Party: Dravida Munnetra Kazhagam(2019-present)
- Other political affiliations: All India Anna Dravida Munnetra Kazhagam (1996-2018); Amma Makkal Munnetra Kazhagam (2018-2019)
- Spouse: Pandyammal
- Children: Shanthini, Nishanth
- Education: M.A., Post Graduate
- Alma mater: University of Madras, 1988

Thanga Tamil Selvan is an Indian politician. He is a member of the Parliament, Theni Parliamentary constituency and was an MLA in the Tamil Nadu Legislative Assembly from Andipatti constituency. Previously, he was a member of Parliament of India representing Tamil Nadu in the Rajya Sabha, the upper house of the Indian Parliament and member of the Tamil Nadu Legislative Assembly from Andipatti constituency in the 2001–2002 period.

== Personal life ==
He was born in Narayana Thevan Patti in Cumbum.He completed his post graduate degree in Master of Arts with the University of Madras. He is married to Pandyammal and has two children, Shanti and Nishant.

== Political career ==
He resigned as member of the Tamil Nadu Legislative Assembly in 2002 to pave way for the former Tamil Nadu Chief Minister Jayalalithaa to contest as an MLA from his constituency Andipatti. Thanga Tamilselvan in June 2019 joined the Dravida Munnetra Kazhagam in the presence of its President MK Stalin. He said that the AIADMK, after the demise of the late leader J Jayalalithaa, was being operated by the Bharatiya Janata Party and he don't wanted to lose his self respect. He was one of the candidates for Theni (Lok Sabha constituency) but lost in the election. He represented Amma Makkal Munnetra Kazhagam.

== Electoral career ==
=== Tamil Nadu Legislative Assembly election ===
| Elections | Constituency | Party | Result | Vote percentage | Opposition candidate | Opposition party | Opposition vote percentage |
|---|---|---|---|---|---|---|---|
| 2001 Tamil Nadu Legislative Assembly election | Andipatti | AIADMK | Won | 53.78 | Aasiyan. P | DMK | 31.67 |
| 2011 Tamil Nadu Legislative Assembly election | Andipatti | AIADMK | Won | 53.75 | L. Mookiah | DMK | 41.42 |
| 2016 Tamil Nadu Legislative Assembly election | Andipatti | AIADMK | Won | 51.93 | L. Mookiah | DMK | 36.72 |
| 2021 Tamil Nadu Legislative Assembly election | Bodinayakkanur | DMK | Lost | 41.45 | O. Panneerselvam | AIADMK | 46.58 |

=== Lok Sabha elections contested ===
| Elections | Constituency | Party | Result | Vote percentage | Opposition candidate | Opposition party | Opposition vote percentage |
|---|---|---|---|---|---|---|---|
| 2009 | Theni | AIADMK | Lost | 41.76 | J. M. Aaroon Rashid | INC | 42.54 |
| 2019 | Theni | AMMK | Lost | 12.26 | P. Ravindhranath | AIADMK | 42.96 |
| 2024 | Theni | DMK | Won | 50.1% | T. T. V. Dhinakaran | AMMK | 25.6% |

=== Rajya Sabha elections contested ===
| Year | Election | Party | PC name | Result |
|---|---|---|---|---|
| 2002 | Rajya Sabha | All India Anna Dravida Munnetra Kazhagam | Tamil Nadu | Won |
