= S. Lakshmanan (politician, born 1972) =

Indian politician

S.Lakshmanan

Member of Tamil Nadu Legislative Assembly
- In office 11 May 2006 – 13 May 2011
- Preceded by: S. Ramaraj
- Succeeded by: O. Panneerselvam
- Constituency: Bodinayakkanur

Personal details
- Born: 1972 (age 53–54) Bodinayakkanur, Tamil Nadu, India
- Party: Dravida Munnetra Kazhagam

S. Lakshmanan (born 1972) is an Indian politician from the Dravida Munnetra Kazhagam (DMK) elected as a member of the Tamil Nadu Legislative Assembly from Bodinayakkanur constituency for the term 2006-2011. He contested again in the 2011 Tamil Nadu Legislative Assembly election for DMK from Bodinayakkanur, losing to O. Panneerselvam of the All India Anna Dravida Munnetra Kazhagam.

== Electoral performance ==
Election	Constituency	Political party	Result	Vote %	Opposition			Ref
Election	Constituency	Political party	Result	Vote %	Candidate	Political party	Vote %	Ref
2006	Bodinayakanur	DMK	Won	43.86%	R. Parthipan	AIADMK	43.10%	
2011	Bodinayakanur	DMK	Lost	38.89%	O. Panneerselvam	AIADMK	56.69%	
2016	Bodinayakanur	DMK	Lost	41.63%	O. Panneerselvam	AIADMK	49.38%	
