= R. Gnanagurusamy =

Indian politician

Member of Parliament, Lok Sabha
- In office 1996-1998
- Preceded by: R. Ramasamy
- Succeeded by: R. Muthiah
- Constituency: Periyakulam

Personal details
- Born: 4 June 1947 (age 78) Periyakulam, Madurai district, Madras Presidency, British India
- Party: DMK
- Spouse: N. Vasantha
- Children: 3 daughters

Rajunaidu Gnanagurusamy is an Indian politician belonging to the Dravida Munnetra Kazhagam.He was elected to the Lok Sabha the lower house of Indian Parliament from Periyakulam.He did his graduation in Thiagaraja College in Madurai and later did Bachelor of Law in Madras Law College.
