= A. Kallanai =

Indian politician

Member of the Tamil Nadu Legislative Assembly
- Incumbent
- Assumed office 2026
- Preceded by: G. Thalapathi
- Constituency: Madurai North

Personal details
- Party: Tamilaga Vettri Kazhagam
- Profession: Politician

A. Kallanai is an Indian politician from Tamil Nadu. He is a member of the Tamil Nadu Legislative Assembly from Madurai North representing Tamilaga Vettri Kazhagam.

== Political career ==
Kallanai won the Madurai North seat in the 2026 Tamil Nadu Legislative Assembly election as a candidate of Tamilaga Vettri Kazhagam. He received 72,853 votes and defeated G. Thalapathi of the Dravida Munnetra Kazhagam by a margin of 18,038 votes.
