= H. Ajmal Khan =

Indian politician

H. Ajmal Khan was an Indian politician and former Member of Parliament elected from Tamil Nadu. He was elected to the Lok Sabha from Periyakulam constituency as a Swatantra Party candidate in the 1967 election.
