= A. Sudalaimuthu =

Indian politician

Member of the Tamil Nadu Legislative Assembly
- In office 1996–2001
- Preceded by: V. Selvam Panneer
- Succeeded by: S. Ramaraj
- Constituency: Bodinayakanur

Personal details
- Party: Dravida Munnetra Kazhagam

A. Sudalaimuthu was elected to the Tamil Nadu Legislative Assembly from the Bodinayakkanur constituency in the 1996 elections. He was a candidate of the Dravida Munnetra Kazhagam (DMK) party. Winner in election by vote difference of 27000 votes. He died at the age of 70 at 21 March 2009.

== Electoral performance ==
Election	Constituency	Political party	Result	Vote %	Opposition			Ref
Election	Constituency	Political party	Result	Vote %	Candidate	Political party	Vote %	Ref
1996	Bodinayakanur	DMK	Won	51.26%	S. P. Jeyakumar	AIADMK	26.90%	
2001	Bodinayakanur	DMK	Lost	39.39%	S. Ramaraj	AIADMK	49.94%	
