= Sedapatti Assembly constituency =

Former constituency in Tamil Nadu, India

Coordinates: 9.81°N 77.79°E

Sedapatti
- Former constituency for the Tamil Nadu Legislative Assembly

Constituency details
- Country: India
- Region: South India
- State: Tamil Nadu
- District: Madurai
- Lok Sabha constituency: Periyakulam
- Established: 1951
- Abolished: 2008
- Total electors: 138,459
- Reservation: None

Sedapatti was a state assembly constituency in Madurai district in Tamil Nadu. Elections and winners from this constituency are listed below. Elections were not held in the years 1957 and 1962.

In 2008, under a Delimitation of Parliamentary and Assembly Constituency Order, Sedapatti Assembly constituency was merged with Usilampatti Assembly constituency.

== Members of the Legislative Assembly ==
Year	Winner	Party
Madras State
1952	Thinakaraswami Thevar	Indian National Congress
1967	V. T. Thevar	Swatantra Party
Tamil Nadu
1971	V. Thavamani Thevar	Forward Bloc
1977	Sedapatti R. Muthiah	All India Anna Dravida Munnetra Kazhagam
1980	Sedapatti R. Muthiah	All India Anna Dravida Munnetra Kazhagam
1984	Sedapatti R. Muthiah	All India Anna Dravida Munnetra Kazhagam
1989	A. Athiyaman	Dravida Munnetra Kazhagam
1991	Sedapatti R. Muthiah	All India Anna Dravida Munnetra Kazhagam
1996	G. Thalapathi	Dravida Munnetra Kazhagam
2001	C. Durairaj	All India Anna Dravida Munnetra Kazhagam
2006	C. Durairaj	All India Anna Dravida Munnetra Kazhagam

== Election results ==
Vote share of winning candidates
2006	43.46%
2001	47.51%
1996	49.69%
1991	58.85%
1989	31.57%
1984	47.29%
1980	59.87%
1977	43.52%
1971	36.66%
1967	63.84%
1952	43.54%

=== 2006 ===
2006 Tamil Nadu Legislative Assembly election: Sedapatti
Party	Candidate	Votes	%	±%
AIADMK	C. Durairaj	42,590	43.46%	−4.04%
DMK	G. Thalapathi	40,541	41.37%	
DMDK	A. Samundeeswari	11,099	11.33%	
BJP	K. Santhakumar	1,119	1.14%	
AIFB	P. Ramadurai	745	0.76%	
Independent	P. Vasimalai	504	0.51%	
Independent	V. Dhamotharan	366	0.37%	
JD(U)	A. Suresh	365	0.37%	
Independent	V. Sundara Moorthy	273	0.28%	
Independent	M. Mohammed Saleem	264	0.27%	
TNJC	N. S. V. Nallathambi	124	0.13%	
Margin of victory		2,049	2.09%	−17.20%
Turnout		97,990	70.77%	6.45%
Registered electors		138,459		
AIADMK hold		Swing	-4.04%	

=== 2001 ===
2001 Tamil Nadu Legislative Assembly election: Sedapatti
Party	Candidate	Votes	%	±%
AIADMK	C. Durairaj	45,393	47.51%	8.18%
PT	P. V. Bakthavatchalam	26,958	28.21%	
Independent	M. Sakunthala	11,301	11.83%	
MDMK	N. Selvaragavan	9,454	9.89%	−0.05%
Independent	M. Thangamudi	879	0.92%	
JP	V. Rajuthevar	693	0.73%	
Independent	S. Seenivasan	445	0.47%	
Independent	S. Shanmugaraj	425	0.44%	
Margin of victory		18,435	19.29%	8.93%
Turnout		95,548	64.32%	−2.15%
Registered electors		148,582		
AIADMK gain from DMK		Swing	-2.19%	

=== 1996 ===
1996 Tamil Nadu Legislative Assembly election: Sedapatti
Party	Candidate	Votes	%	±%
DMK	G. Thalapathi	48,899	49.69%	18.21%
AIADMK	Sedapatti Muthiah	38,698	39.33%	−19.52%
MDMK	Pon. Muthu Ramalingam	9,785	9.94%	
Independent	T. K. Karuthapandian	293	0.30%	
Independent	T. Maharajan	133	0.14%	
Independent	S. K. Muthiah Naicker	127	0.13%	
Independent	S. Sankarapandian	116	0.12%	
Independent	S. Alagarsam	63	0.06%	
Independent	V. Annamalai	60	0.06%	
Independent	S. Shanmugaraj	58	0.06%	
Independent	R. P. K. Appan	52	0.05%	
Margin of victory		10,201	10.37%	−16.99%
Turnout		98,401	66.47%	4.30%
Registered electors		152,268		
DMK gain from AIADMK		Swing	-9.15%	

=== 1991 ===
1991 Tamil Nadu Legislative Assembly election: Sedapatti
Party	Candidate	Votes	%	±%
AIADMK	Sedapatti Muthiah	52,627	58.85%	34.28%
DMK	A. Athiyaman	28,158	31.49%	−0.09%
PMK	S. Ravi	7,195	8.05%	
Independent	J. Victor Samuel Raj	423	0.47%	
Independent	V. Kalai Rajan	253	0.28%	
Independent	M. Angappan	152	0.17%	
Independent	T. Thavasi Lingam	125	0.14%	
Independent	N. Murugesan	108	0.12%	
Independent	S. K. Muthiah	89	0.10%	
Independent	N. Athi Narayanan	80	0.09%	
Independent	T. Assan	74	0.08%	
Margin of victory		24,469	27.36%	20.35%
Turnout		89,430	62.16%	−8.36%
Registered electors		147,453		
AIADMK gain from DMK		Swing	27.27%	

=== 1989 ===
1989 Tamil Nadu Legislative Assembly election: Sedapatti
Party	Candidate	Votes	%	±%
DMK	A. Athiyaman	29,431	31.57%	
AIADMK	Sedapatti Muthiah	22,895	24.56%	−22.73%
INC	A. T. Kandasami	21,749	23.33%	−17.87%
Independent	T. P. Ganapathi	8,237	8.84%	
TNC(K)	S. Selvarasu	5,111	5.48%	
AIFB	V. Thavamani Thevar	4,983	5.35%	
Independent	K. Pandi	299	0.32%	
Independent	R. P. K. Appan	290	0.31%	
Independent	A. Rajaram	111	0.12%	
Independent	K. Muniyandi	104	0.11%	
Margin of victory		6,536	7.01%	0.92%
Turnout		93,210	70.53%	−0.20%
Registered electors		134,643		
DMK gain from AIADMK		Swing	-15.72%	

=== 1984 ===
1984 Tamil Nadu Legislative Assembly election: Sedapatti
Party	Candidate	Votes	%	±%
AIADMK	Sedapatti Muthiah	38,808	47.29%	−12.58%
INC	N. S. Selvaraj	33,810	41.20%	
Independent	S. S. Rajendran	8,810	10.74%	
Independent	T. Thangavelu	334	0.41%	
Independent	Dorairaj	300	0.37%	
Margin of victory		4,998	6.09%	−13.65%
Turnout		82,062	70.72%	10.35%
Registered electors		122,094		
AIADMK hold		Swing	-12.58%	

=== 1980 ===
1980 Tamil Nadu Legislative Assembly election: Sedapatti
Party	Candidate	Votes	%	±%
AIADMK	Sedapatti Muthiah	42,012	59.87%	16.35%
DMK	R. S. Thangarasan	28,157	40.13%	21.99%
Margin of victory		13,855	19.75%	2.64%
Turnout		70,169	60.37%	1.62%
Registered electors		118,078		
AIADMK hold		Swing	16.35%	

=== 1977 ===
1977 Tamil Nadu Legislative Assembly election: Sedapatti
Party	Candidate	Votes	%	±%
AIADMK	Sedapatti Muthiah	28,040	43.52%	
INC	A. R. P. Alagarsamy	17,018	26.41%	
DMK	R. S. Thangarajan	11,687	18.14%	
JP	Sankaranayanan	4,909	7.62%	
Independent	R. Periakaruppan Alias Appan	2,775	4.31%	
Margin of victory		11,022	17.11%	8.19%
Turnout		64,429	58.75%	−7.41%
Registered electors		111,328		
AIADMK gain from AIFB		Swing	6.86%	

=== 1971 ===
1971 Tamil Nadu Legislative Assembly election: Sedapatti
Party	Candidate	Votes	%	±%
AIFB	V. Thavamani Thevar	20,334	36.66%	
SWA	M. K. Ramakrishnan	15,388	27.75%	
Independent	S. Naicker Seenivasan M. S	14,443	26.04%	
Independent	P. K. Subbaih	5,294	9.55%	
Margin of victory		4,946	8.92%	−21.50%
Turnout		55,459	66.17%	−11.50%
Registered electors		92,369		
AIFB gain from SWA		Swing	-27.18%	

=== 1967 ===
1967 Madras Legislative Assembly election: Sedapatti
Party	Candidate	Votes	%	±%
SWA	V. Thavamani Thevar	41,167	63.84%	
INC	T. A. Nadar	21,553	33.42%	
Independent	I. Chinnapan	915	1.42%	
Independent	S. V. Reddiar	471	0.73%	
Independent	R. Periyakaruppan	377	0.58%	
Margin of victory		19,614	30.42%	
Turnout		64,483	77.67%	
Registered electors		85,921		
SWA win (new seat)				

=== 1952 ===
1952 Madras Legislative Assembly election: Sedapatti
Party	Candidate	Votes	%	±%
INC	Thinakaraswami Thevar	18,792	43.54%	43.54%
Socialist Party (India)	Kamana Thevar	7,796	18.06%	
KMPP	Poya Thevar	6,410	14.85%	
Independent	P. K. Subbiah	6,011	13.93%	
Independent	S. V. Rajiah	3,113	7.21%	
Independent	Selvaraj	1,039	2.41%	
Margin of victory		10,996	25.48%	
Turnout		43,161	58.33%	
Registered electors		73,991		
INC win (new seat)				
