= O. R. Ramachandran =

Indian politician (1947–2024)

O. R. Ramachandran (1947 – 4 October 2024) was an Indian politician who was a Member of the Legislative Assembly of Tamil Nadu. He was elected to the Tamil Nadu legislative assembly as an Indian National Congress candidate from Cumbum constituency in 1991 election and as a Tamil Maanila Congress (Moopanar) candidate in 1996 and 2001 elections.

Ramachandran died on 4 October 2024, at the age of 77.
