= S. T. K. Jakkaiyan =

Indian politician

Member of the Tamil Nadu Legislative Assembly
- In office 19 May 2016 – 2 May 2021
- Preceded by: N. Eramakrishnan
- Succeeded by: N. Eramakrishnan
- Constituency: Cumbum

Personal details
- Party: All India Anna Dravida Munnetra Kazhagam

Sakkaiyan Thirumalai Kullapakavudar Jakkaiyan is an Indian politician who served in the Tamil Nadu Legislative Assembly, representing Cumbum as a member of the All India Anna Dravida Munnetra Kazhagam from 2016 until 2021. In 2018, Jakkaiyan was one of 19 dissident AIADMK MLAs who faced expulsion from the assembly for opposing Chief Minister Edappadi K. Palaniswami, though Jakkaiyan later renounced this position and was not expelled.
