= A. Laser =

Indian politician

- Occupation: Politician

A. Laser is an Indian politician and incumbent member of the Tamil Nadu Legislative Assembly from the Periyakulam constituency. He represents the Communist Party of India (Marxist) party.
