= K. S. Saravana Kumar =

Indian politician

Saravana Kumar is an Indian politician and is Member of the Legislative Assembly of Tamil Nadu. He was elected to the Tamil Nadu legislative assembly as a Dravida Munnetra Kazhagam candidate from Periyakulam constituency in the by-election in 2019.

== Electoral performance ==
2021 Tamil Nadu Legislative Assembly election: Periyakulam
Party	Candidate	Votes	%	±%
DMK	K. S. Saravana Kumar	92,251	46.28%	+6.77
AIADMK	M. Murugan	70,930	35.58%	−11.36
AMMK	Dr. K. Kathirkamu	16,424	8.24%	New
NTK	Vimala	11,794	5.92%	+5.37
MNM	S. Pandiyarajan	5,680	2.85%	New
NOTA	NOTA	2,451	1.23%	+0.05
Margin of victory		21,321	10.70%	3.26%
Turnout		199,346	69.83%	−5.11%
Rejected ballots		10	0.01%	
Registered electors		285,471		
DMK hold		Swing	-0.66%	

2019 Tamil Nadu Legislative Assembly by-elections: Periyakulam
Party	Candidate	Votes	%	±%
DMK	K. S. Saravana Kumar	88,393		
AIADMK	M. Mayilvel	68,073		
AMMK	Dr. K. Kathirkamu	26,338		
NTK	Shobana	5,825		
MNM	Prabhu	5,727		
Majority		20,320		
Turnout		1,96,622	73.98	
Registered electors		2,68,739		
DMK gain from AIADMK		Swing		
