= C. Durairaj =

Indian politician

Member of the Legislative Assembly of Tamil Nadu
- In office 2001–2011
- Constituency: Sedapatti

Personal details
- Died: 5 January 2014
- Party: Anna Dravida Munnetra Kazhagam
- Occupation: Politician

C. Durairaj (died 5 January 2014) was an Indian politician and presently serving Member of the Legislative Assembly of Tamil Nadu. He was elected to the Tamil Nadu legislative assembly as an Anna Dravida Munnetra Kazhagam candidate from Sedapatti constituency in 2001 and 2006 elections.

He served as the Minister for Local Administration of Tamil Nadu from May 2001 - August 2002.
