= Bodinayakkanur =

Bodinayakanur
- Town
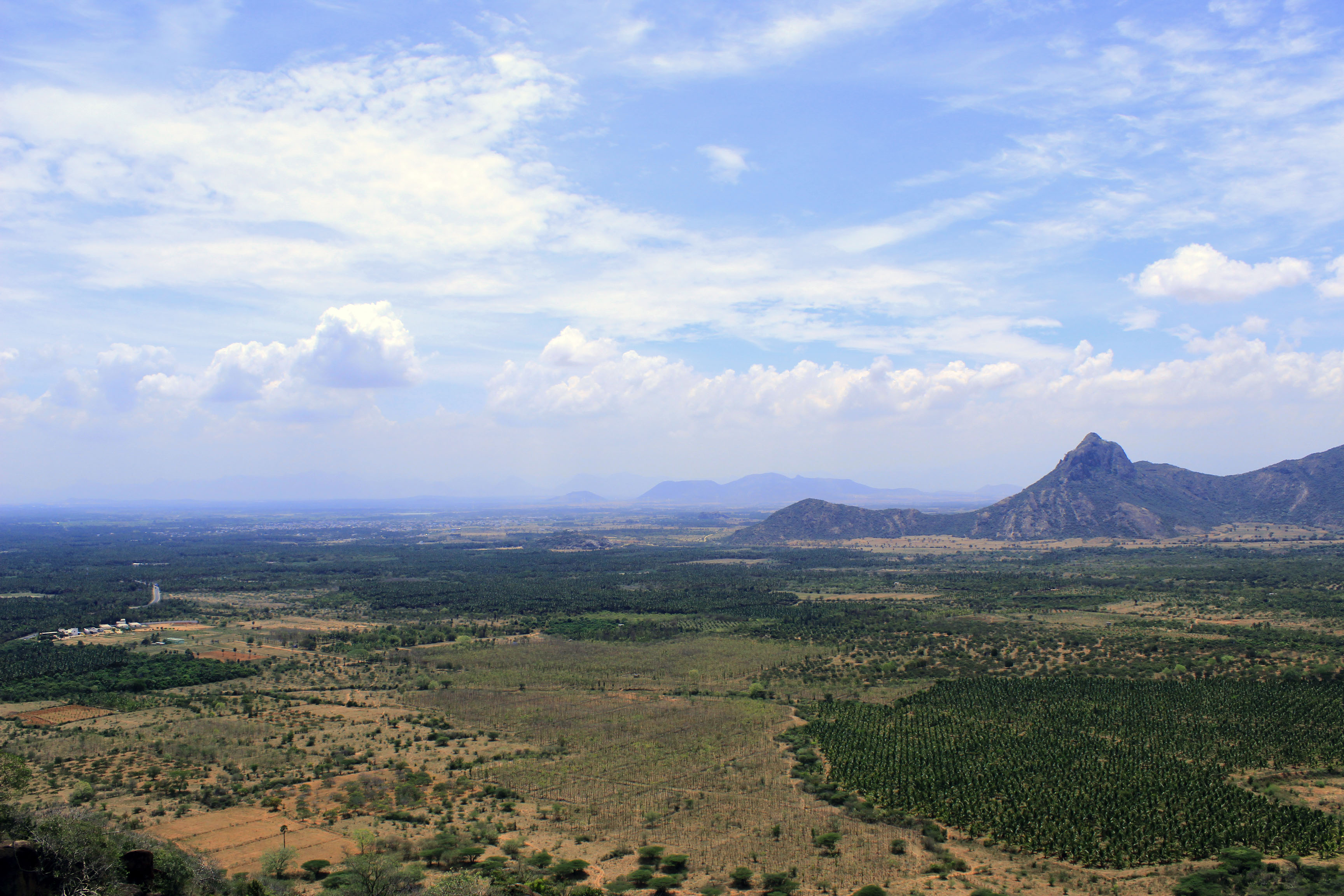
- View of Bodinayakanur from Bodi Mettu hills

- Bodinayakkanur, Tamil Nadu, India
- Coordinates: 10.0106°N 77.3497°E
- Country: India
- State: Tamil Nadu
- Region: Madurai
- District: Theni

Government
  - Type: Selection Grade Municipality
  - Body: Bodinayakanur Municipality

Area
  - Total: 7.23 km^{2} (2.79 sq mi)
- Elevation: 393 m (1,289 ft)

Population
  - Total: 75,676
  - Density: 10,500/km^{2} (27,100/sq mi)

Languages
  - Official: Tamil
- Time zone: UTC+5:30 (IST)
- PIN: 625513
- Telephone code: 04546
- Vehicle registration: TN-60Z
- Website: municipality.tn.gov.in/bodi/

Bodinayakanur is a town in the state of Tamil Nadu, India. Nestled at the base of the Western Ghat Hills, the town is widely known as India's cardamom capital for its pedigree in cultivating that crop.

Despite a population estimated to be no higher than 0.2% of Tamilnadu's total population, Bodinayakanur has been the constituency for 2 of 12 Chief Ministers of the state.

== Demographics ==
=== Population and Literacy ===
According to India's 2011 census, Bodi had a population of 75,676 with an estimated 1,018 females for every 1,000 males, much higher than India's national average of 929. The literacy rate of the town stood at 76.18%, compared to the national average of 72.99%. The town had a total of 20,333 households. There were a total of 30,234 workers.

== Government and politics ==
Bodinayakanur Assembly constituency falls under the purview of the Theni (Lok Sabha constituency).
