= Theni Lok Sabha constituency =

Parliamentary constituency in Tamil Nadu, India

Coordinates: 10.01°N 77.48°E

Theni
- Lok Sabha constituency
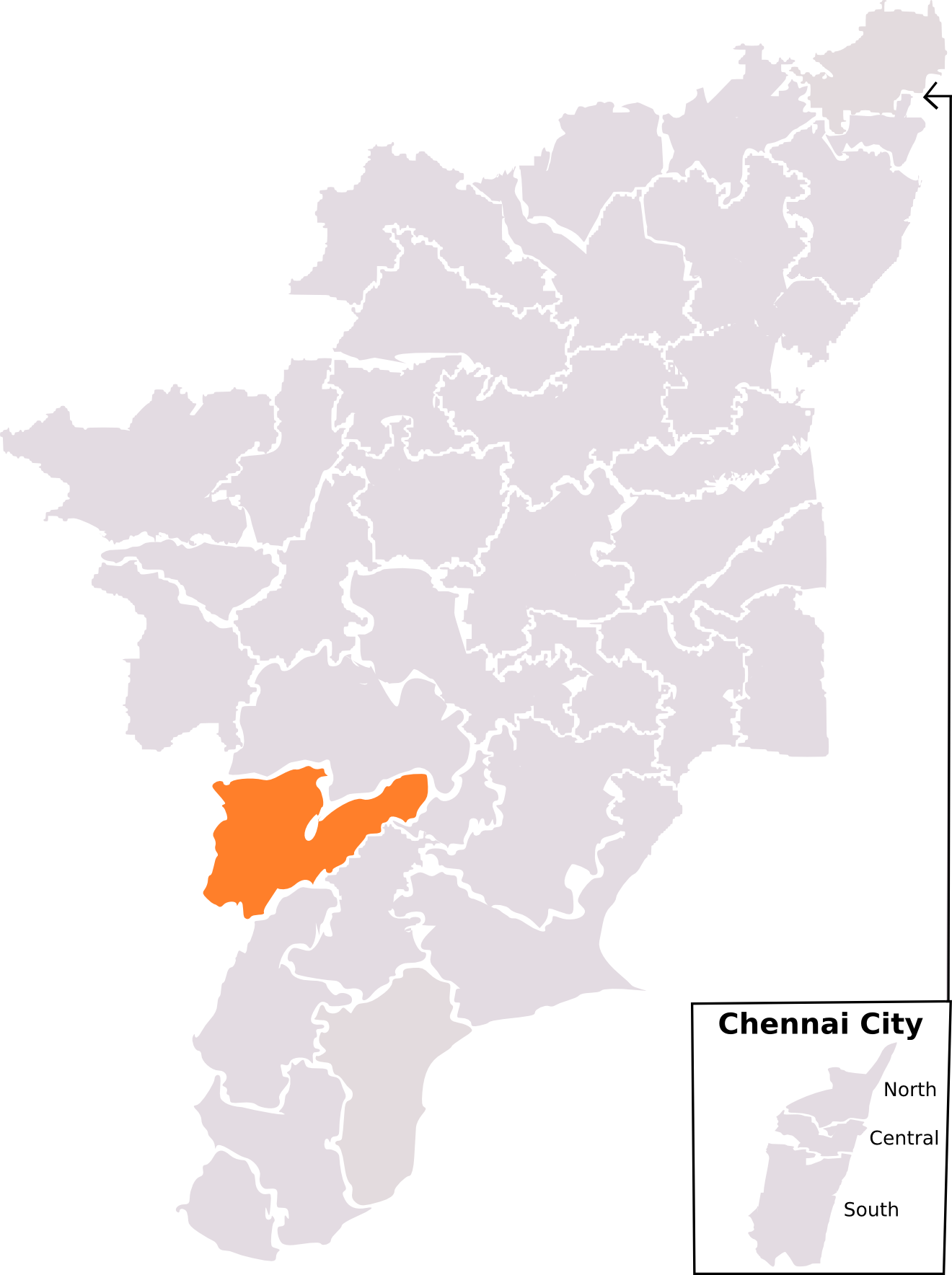
- Area of Theni Lok Sabha Constituency

Constituency details
- Country: India
- Region: South India
- State: Tamil Nadu
- Assembly constituencies: Sholavandan; Usilampatti; Andipatti; Periyakulam; Bodinayakanur; Cumbum
- Established: 2009
- Total electors: 1,561,040
- Reservation: None

Member of Parliament
- 18th Lok Sabha
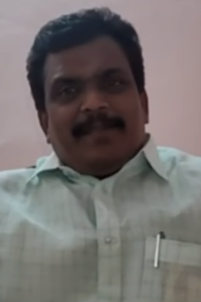
- Incumbent Thanga Tamil Selvan
- Party: DMK
- Alliance: None
- Elected year: 2024

Theni Lok Sabha constituency (Tamil: தேனி மக்களவைத் தொகுதி) is one of the 39 Lok Sabha (parliamentary) constituencies in Tamil Nadu, a state in southern India.

== Assembly segments ==
=== 2009–present ===
Theni Lok Sabha constituency comprises the following legislative assembly segments:

Constituency number	Name	Reserved for (SC/ST/None)	District	Party	2024 Lead
190	Sholavandan	SC	Madurai	TVK	DMK
197	Usilampatti	None	Madurai	TVK	DMK
198	Andipatti	None	Theni	DMK	DMK
199	Periyakulam	SC	Theni	TVK	DMK
200	Bodinayakanur	None	Theni	DMK	DMK
201	Cumbum	None	Theni	TVK	DMK

== Members of Parliament ==
Year	Winner	Party
2009	J. M. Aaroon Rashid	Indian National Congress
2014	R. Parthipan	All India Anna Dravida Munnetra Kazhagam
2019	P. Ravindhranath	All India Anna Dravida Munnetra Kazhagam
2024	Thanga Tamil Selvan	Dravida Munnetra Kazhagam

== Election results ==
Vote share of winning candidates
2024	50.08%
2019	42.96%
2014	53.06%
2009	42.54%

=== General Elections 2024 ===
2024 Indian general election: Theni
Party	Candidate	Votes	%	±%
DMK	Thanga Tamil Selvan	571,493	50.08	N/A
AMMK	T. T. V. Dhinakaran	292,668	25.65	▲13.39
AIADMK	V. T. Narayanasamy	155,587	13.63	▼29.33
NOTA	None of the above	11,336	0.99	▲0.08
Margin of victory		2,78,825	24.43	▲17.86
Turnout		11,41,219		
DMK gain from AIADMK		Swing		

=== General election 2019 ===
2019 Indian general elections: Theni
Party	Candidate	Votes	%	±%
AIADMK	P. Ravindhranath	504,813	42.96	▼10.10
INC	E. V. K. S. Elangovan	428,120	36.44	▲29.81
AMMK	Thanga Tamil Selvan	144,050	12.26	New
MNM	S. Radhakrishnan	16,879	1.44	New
NOTA	None of the above	10,686	0.91	▼0.05
Margin of victory		76,693	6.57	−22.96
Turnout		11,67,919	75.27	0.91
Registered electors		15,61,040		8.31
AIADMK hold		Swing	-10.40	

=== General election 2014 ===
2014 Indian general elections: Theni
Party	Candidate	Votes	%	±%
AIADMK	R. Parthipan	571,254	53.06	▲11.30
DMK	Pon. Muthuramalingam	256,722	23.84	New
MDMK	Alagusundaram	134,362	12.28	New
INC	J. M. Aaroon Rashid	71,432	6.63	▼35.91
NOTA	None of the above	10,312	0.96	New
Margin of victory		3,14,532	29.53%	28.74%
Turnout		10,65,271	74.70%	−0.55%
Registered electors		14,41,302		34.08%
AIADMK gain from INC		Swing	11.07%	

=== General election 2009 ===
2009 Indian general elections: Theni
Party	Candidate	Votes	%	±%
INC	J. M. Aaroon Rashid	340,575	42.54	New
AIADMK	Thanga Tamil Selvan	334,273	41.76	New
DMDK	M. G. Santhanam	70,908	8.86	New
BSP	Kavitha	8,023	1.00	New
BJP	A. Parvathi	7,640	0.95	New
PT	P. Selvarajan	8,248	0.28	New
Margin of victory		6,302	0.79%	
Turnout		8,00,362	74.47%	
Registered electors		10,74,931		
INC win (new seat)				

== See also ==
- Lok Sabha
- Theni district
- Parliament of India
- List of constituencies of the Lok Sabha
