= S. P. M. Syed Khan =

Indian politician

Shri S.P.M. Syed Khan is an Indian politician from the All India Anna Dravida Munnetra Kazhagam party who represented Tamil Nadu in the Rajya Sabha, the upper house of the Parliament of India.
