= R. Parthipan =

Indian politician

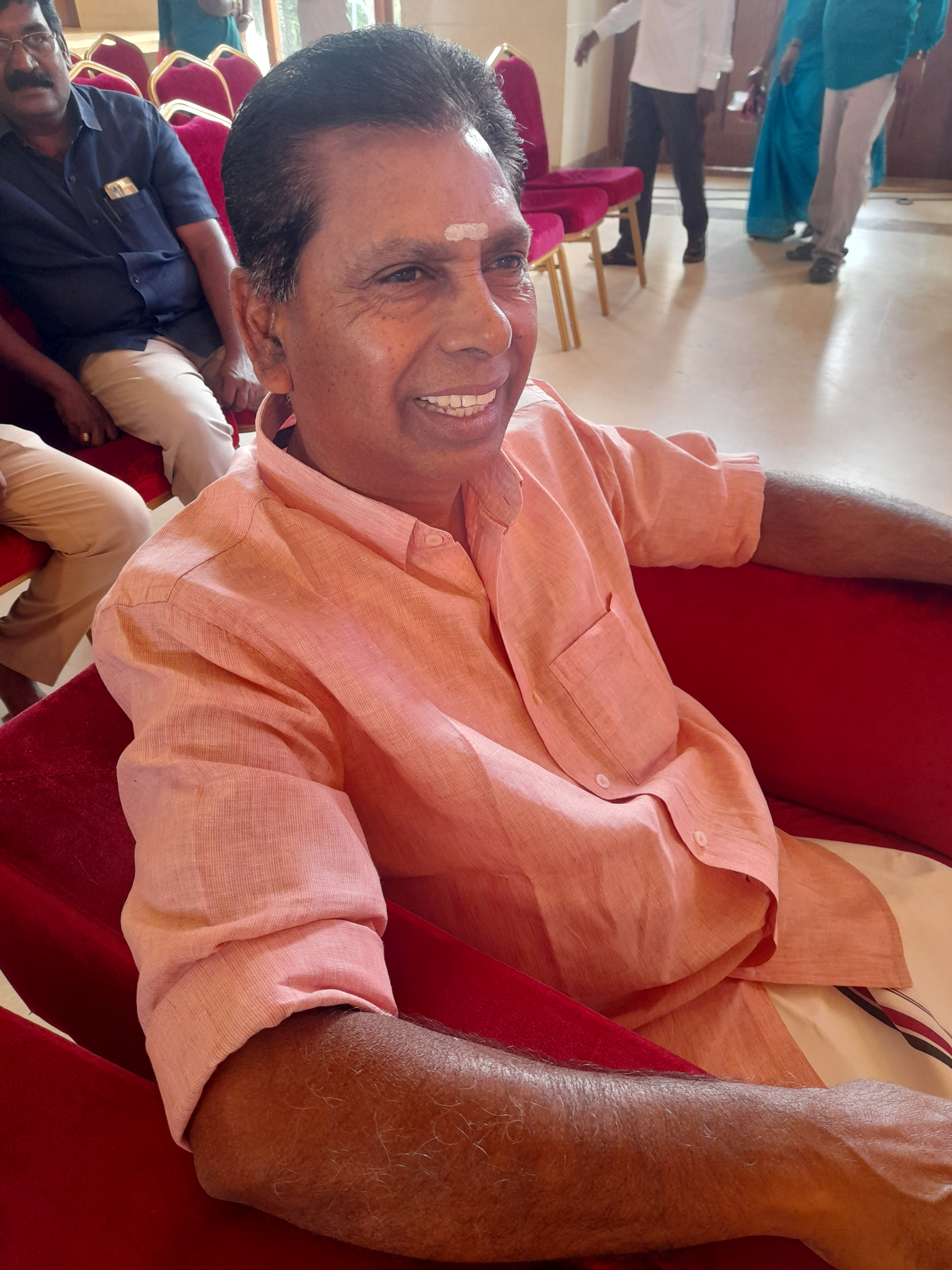

Member of the India Parliament for Theni
- In office 1 September 2014 – 23 May 2019
- Constituency: Theni

Personal details
- Born: 4 June 1963 (age 63) Theni, Madras State, India
- Party: All India Anna Dravida Munnetra Kazhagam
- Spouse: Smt. Nithya
- Children: 2
- Education: Madurai Kamaraj University
- Occupation: Agriculturist
- As of 17 December, 2016

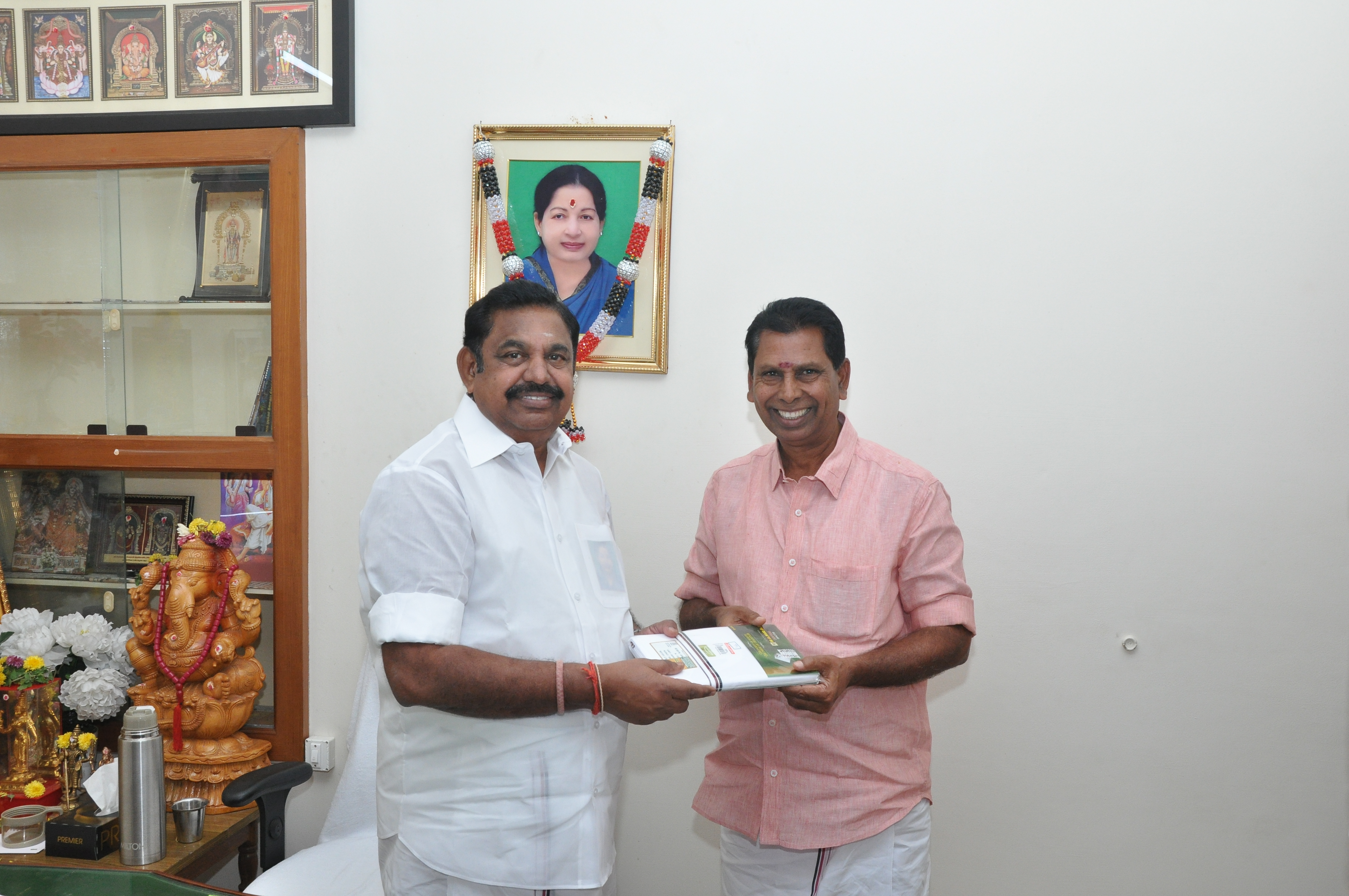
R.Parthipan with Edapadi Palanichamy (AIADMK)

R. Parthipan (born 4 June 1963) is an Indian politician and Member of Parliament elected from Tamil Nadu. He was elected to the Lok Sabha from Theni constituency as an Anna Dravida Munnetra Kazhagam candidate in 2014 election.
