= Bodinayakkanur Assembly constituency =

One of the 234 State Legislative Assembly Constituencies in Tamil Nadu in India

Coordinates: 10.0081171°N 77.3294266°E

Bodinayakkanur
- Constituency No. 200 for the Tamil Nadu Legislative Assembly

Constituency details
- Country: India
- Region: South India
- State: Tamil Nadu
- Lok Sabha constituency: Theni
- Established: 1957
- Total electors: 263,292

Member of Legislative Assembly
- 17th Tamil Nadu Legislative Assembly
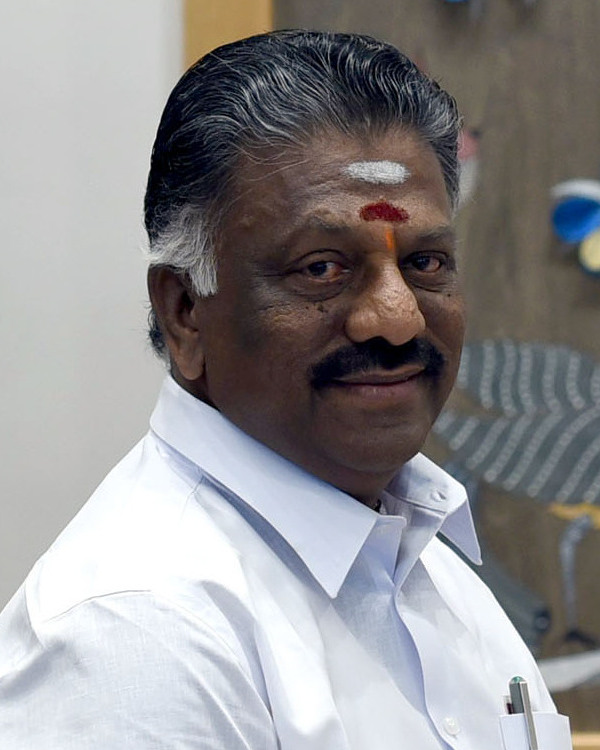
- Incumbent O. Panneerselvam; Former Chief Minister of Tamil Nadu
- Party: DMK
- Alliance: SPA
- Elected year: 2026

Bodinayakkanur is a state assembly constituency in Theni district in Tamil Nadu. The constituency has been in existence since 1957 election. It is one of the 234 State Legislative Assembly Constituencies in Tamil Nadu. Former chief minister Jayalalithaa, first contested assembly polls in 1989, from this constituency. From 2011, former chief minister O. Pannerselvam represented this constituency.

== Members of the Legislative Assembly ==
Election	Member	Party
1957	A. S. Subbaraj	Indian National Congress
1962	A. S. Subbaraj	Indian National Congress
1967	S. Srinivasan	Indian National Congress
1971	M. Surulivel	Dravida Munnetra Kazhagam
1977	P. Ramadass	All India Anna Dravida Munnetra Kazhagam
1980	K. M. S. Subramanian	All India Anna Dravida Munnetra Kazhagam
1984	K. S. M. Ramachandran	Indian National Congress
1989	J. Jayalalithaa	All India Anna Dravida Munnetra Kazhagam
1991	V. Panneerselvam	All India Anna Dravida Munnetra Kazhagam
1996	A. Sudalaimuthu	Dravida Munnetra Kazhagam
2001	S. Ramaraj	All India Anna Dravida Munnetra Kazhagam
2006	S. Lakshmanan	Dravida Munnetra Kazhagam
2011	O. Panneerselvam	All India Anna Dravida Munnetra Kazhagam
2016	O. Panneerselvam	All India Anna Dravida Munnetra Kazhagam
2021	O. Panneerselvam	All India Anna Dravida Munnetra Kazhagam
2026	O. Panneerselvam	Dravida Munnetra Kazhagam

Madras State

== Election results ==
Vote share of winning candidates
2026	38.62%
2021	46.58%
2016	49.38%
2011	56.69%
2006	43.86%
2001	49.94%
1996	51.26%
1991	62.98%
1989	54.41%
1984	61.00%
1980	59.77%
1977	41.12%
1971	54.43%
1967	49.83%
1962	54.61%
1957	58.11%

=== Assembly election 2026 ===
2026 Tamil Nadu Legislative Assembly election : Bodinayakanur
Party	Candidate	Votes	%	±%
DMK	O. Panneerselvam	85,206	38.62	▼3.10
TVK	Prakash. S	78,401	35.54	New
AIADMK	Narayanasamy. V. T	41,286	18.71	▼28.8
NOTA	None of the above	931	0.42	▼0.24
Margin of victory		6,805	3.08	▼2.08
Turnout		221,116	83.63	▲6.45
Total valid votes		220,628		
Registered electors		264,386		▼5.18
DMK gain from AIADMK		Swing	▼8.27	

=== Assembly election 2021 ===
2021 Tamil Nadu Legislative Assembly election : Bodinayakanur
Party	Candidate	Votes	%	±%
AIADMK	O. Panneerselvam	100,050	46.89	▼2.49
DMK	Thanga Tamil Selvan	89,029	41.72	▲0.09
NTK	M. Prem Chandar	11,114	5.21	▲4.55
AMMK	M. Muthusamy	5,649	2.65	New
MNM	P. Ganesh Kumar	4,128	1.93	New
NOTA	None of the above	1,403	0.66	▼0.32
Margin of victory		11,021	5.16	▼2.58
Turnout		215,197	77.18	▼1.18
Total valid votes		213,392		
Rejected ballots		402	0.19	▲0.09
Registered electors		278,815		▲8.28
AIADMK hold		Swing		

=== Assembly election 2016 ===
2016 Tamil Nadu Legislative Assembly election : Bodinayakanur
Party	Candidate	Votes	%	±%
AIADMK	O. Panneerselvam	99,531	49.38	▼7.31
DMK	S. Lakshmanan	83,923	41.63	▲2.74
DMDK	A. Veerabadran	6,889	3.42	New
BJP	V. Venkateswaran	3,250	1.61	▲0.66
NOTA	None of the above	1,966	0.98	New
NTK	P. Anbalagan	1,324	0.66	New
Margin of victory		15,608	7.74	▼10.06
Turnout		201,775	78.36	▼2.80
Total valid votes		201,579		
Rejected ballots		196	0.10	▼0.10
Registered electors		257,500		▲24.15
AIADMK hold		Swing		

=== Assembly election 2011 ===
2011 Tamil Nadu Legislative Assembly election : Bodinayakanur
Party	Candidate	Votes	%	±%
AIADMK	O. Panneerselvam	95,235	56.69	▲13.59
DMK	S. Lakshmanan	65,329	38.89	▼4.97
BJP	S. N. Veerasamy	1,598	0.95	▼0.23
Margin of victory		29,906	17.80	▲17.03
Turnout		168,332	81.16	▲10.04
Total valid votes		167,998		
Rejected ballots		334	0.20	▲0.20
Registered electors		207,412		▲25.65
AIADMK gain from DMK		Swing	▲12.83	

=== Assembly election 2006 ===
2006 Tamil Nadu Legislative Assembly election : Bodinayakanur
Party	Candidate	Votes	%	±%
DMK	S. Lakshmanan	51,474	43.86	▲4.47
AIADMK	R. Parthipan	50,576	43.10	New
Independent	P. Muthuvelraj	5,460	4.65	
DMDK	A. Atchayakannan	4,973	4.24	New
BJP	E. Subramani	1,379	1.18	New
BSP	R. Thangapandi	1,022	0.87	New
Margin of victory		898	0.77	▼9.77
Turnout		117,392	71.12	▲12.03
Total valid votes		117,347		
Registered electors		165,068		▼8.81
DMK gain from AIADMK		Swing	▼6.08	

=== Assembly election 2001 ===
2001 Tamil Nadu Legislative Assembly election : Bodinayakanur
Party	Candidate	Votes	%	±%
AIADMK	S. Ramaraj	53,410	49.94	▲23.04
DMK	A. Sudalaimuthu	42,132	39.39	▼11.87
MDMK	G. Aroselvan	8,439	7.89	▼6.10
Independent	N. Rajaram	895	0.84	
Independent	G. Ganesan	832	0.78	
Margin of victory		11,278	10.54	▼13.82
Turnout		106,957	59.09	▼5.84
Total valid votes		106,957		
Registered electors		181,022		▲7.04
AIADMK gain from DMK		Swing	▼1.32	

=== Assembly election 1996 ===
1996 Tamil Nadu Legislative Assembly election : Bodinayakanur
Party	Candidate	Votes	%	±%
DMK	A. Sudalaimuthu	54,893	51.26	▲25.14
AIADMK	S. P. Jeyakumar	28,806	26.90	New
MDMK	R. Subramani	14,979	13.99	New
BJP	E. M. Sundaram	3,578	3.34	▼0.21
PMK	S. Ravichandran	2,904	2.71	▼4.39
Margin of victory		26,087	24.36	▼12.50
Turnout		109,806	64.93	▲4.13
Total valid votes		107,079		
Rejected ballots		3,091	2.81	▲0.87
Registered electors		169,113		▲0.32
DMK gain from AIADMK		Swing	▼11.72	

=== Assembly election 1991 ===
1991 Tamil Nadu Legislative Assembly election : Bodinayakanur
Party	Candidate	Votes	%	±%
AIADMK	V. Panneerselvam	63,297	62.98	New
DMK	G. Ponnu Pillai	26,253	26.12	▼1.15
PMK	K. Manickam	7,136	7.10	New
BJP	A. Vetrivel	3,568	3.55	New
Margin of victory		37,044	36.86	▲9.72
Turnout		102,493	60.80	▼10.47
Total valid votes		100,507		
Rejected ballots		1,986	1.94	▲0.54
Registered electors		168,572		▲11.89
AIADMK gain from AIADMK		Swing	▲8.57	

=== Assembly election 1989 ===
1989 Tamil Nadu Legislative Assembly election : Bodinayakanur
Party	Candidate	Votes	%	±%
AIADMK	J. Jayalalithaa	57,603	54.41	New
DMK	Muthu Manoharan	28,872	27.27	▼11.38
INC	K. S. M. Ramachandran	12,220	11.54	▼49.46
AIADMK	Vennira Aadai Nirmala	6,354	6.00	New
Margin of victory		28,731	27.14	▲4.79
Turnout		107,373	71.27	▲2.10
Total valid votes		105,871		
Rejected ballots		1,502	1.40	▼2.73
Registered electors		150,663		▲12.39
AIADMK gain from INC		Swing	▼6.59	

=== Assembly election 1984 ===
1984 Tamil Nadu Legislative Assembly election : Bodinayakanur
Party	Candidate	Votes	%	±%
INC	K. S. M. Ramachandran	54,231	61.00	▲21.11
DMK	Muthu Manoharan	34,359	38.65	New
Margin of victory		19,872	22.35	▲2.46
Turnout		92,731	69.17	▲3.34
Total valid votes		88,902		
Rejected ballots		3,829	4.13	▲2.99
Registered electors		134,056		▲2.31
INC gain from AIADMK		Swing	▲1.23	

=== Assembly election 1980 ===
1980 Tamil Nadu Legislative Assembly election : Bodinayakanur
Party	Candidate	Votes	%	±%
AIADMK	K. M. S. Subramanian	50,972	59.77	New
INC	K. S. M. Ramachandran	34,013	39.89	▲11.51
Margin of victory		16,959	19.89	▲7.15
Turnout		86,259	65.83	▲7.06
Total valid votes		85,275		
Rejected ballots		984	1.14	▲0.10
Registered electors		131,024		▲7.96
AIADMK gain from AIADMK		Swing	▲18.65	

=== Assembly election 1977 ===
1977 Tamil Nadu Legislative Assembly election : Bodinayakanur
Party	Candidate	Votes	%	±%
AIADMK	P. Ramadass	29,022	41.12	New
INC	K. S. M. Ramachandran	20,030	28.38	New
JP	T. Govindraj	14,625	20.72	New
DMK	M. Muthuchamy	6,907	9.79	▼44.64
Margin of victory		8,992	12.74	▼12.42
Turnout		71,325	58.77	▼11.17
Total valid votes		70,584		
Rejected ballots		741	1.04	▲1.04
Registered electors		121,366		▲19.43
AIADMK gain from DMK		Swing	▼13.31	

=== Assembly election 1971 ===
1971 Tamil Nadu Legislative Assembly election : Bodinayakanur
Party	Candidate	Votes	%	±%
DMK	M. Surulivel	35,427	54.43	New
Independent	A. Yellanna	19,050	29.27	
Independent	S. At. A. P. Soundaravel	10,614	16.31	
Margin of victory		16,377	25.16	▲24.06
Turnout		71,069	69.94	▼6.23
Total valid votes		65,091		
Registered electors		101,621		▲7.00
DMK gain from INC		Swing	▲4.60	

=== Assembly election 1967 ===
1967 Madras State Legislative Assembly election : Bodinayakanur
Party	Candidate	Votes	%	±%
INC	S. Srinivasan	34,671	49.83	▼4.78
CPI(M)	P. V. Durairaj	33,905	48.73	New
Independent	P. R. Chetty	1,007	1.45	
Margin of victory		766	1.10	▼27.65
Turnout		72,342	76.17	▲2.20
Total valid votes		69,583		
Registered electors		94,970		▲3.64
INC hold		Swing		

=== Assembly election 1962 ===
1962 Madras State Legislative Assembly election : Bodinayakanur
Party	Candidate	Votes	%	±%
INC	A. S. Subbaraj	35,398	54.61	▼3.50
Independent	R. Subbiah	16,759	25.85	
Socialist Labour	R. K. Rajan	12,668	19.54	New
Margin of victory		18,639	28.75	▲12.53
Turnout		67,788	73.97	▲13.59
Total valid votes		64,825		
Registered electors		91,637		▲3.09
INC hold		Swing		

=== Assembly election 1957 ===
1957 Madras State Legislative Assembly election : Bodinayakanur
Party	Candidate	Votes	%	±%
INC	A. S. Subbaraj	31,188	58.11	New
Independent	M. Muthiala	22,483	41.89	New
Margin of victory		8,705	16.22	
Turnout		53,671	60.38	
Total valid votes		53,671		
Registered electors		88,886		
INC win (new seat)				
