= Periyakulam Assembly constituency =

One of the 234 State Legislative Assembly Constituencies in Tamil Nadu, in India

Coordinates: 10.12°N 77.55°E

Periyakulam
- Constituency No. 199 for the Tamil Nadu Legislative Assembly

Constituency details
- Country: India
- Region: South India
- State: Tamil Nadu
- District: Theni
- Established: 1951
- Total electors: 265,830
- Reservation: SC

Member of Legislative Assembly
- 17th Tamil Nadu Legislative Assembly
- Incumbent Sabari Iyngaran G
- Party: TVK
- Elected year: 2026

Periyakulam is a state assembly constituency in Theni district in Tamil Nadu, India. Elections were not held in the years 1957 and 1962. It includes the two major towns Theni and Periyakulam. It is one of the 234 State Legislative Assembly Constituencies in Tamil Nadu, in India.

== Members of the Legislative Assembly ==
Year	Winner	Party
Madras State
1952	P. K. Mookiah Thevar	All India Forward Bloc
1952	V. Muthu	Indian National Congress
1967	K. M. M. Metha	Dravida Munnetra Kazhagam
Tamil Nadu
1971	N. Anbuchezhian	Dravida Munnetra Kazhagam
1977	K. Pannai Sethuram	All India Anna Dravida Munnetra Kazhagam
1980	K. Gopalakrishnan	All India Anna Dravida Munnetra Kazhagam
1984	Dr. T. Mohammed Saleem	All India Anna Dravida Munnetra Kazhagam
1989	L. Mookiah	Dravida Munnetra Kazhagam
1991	M. Periyaveeran	All India Anna Dravida Munnetra Kazhagam
1996	L. Mookiah	Dravida Munnetra Kazhagam
2001	O. Panneerselvam	All India Anna Dravida Munnetra Kazhagam
2006	O. Panneerselvam	All India Anna Dravida Munnetra Kazhagam
2011	A. Laser	Communist Party of India (Marxist)
2016	K. Kathirkamu	All India Anna Dravida Munnetra Kazhagam
2019^	K. S. Saravana Kumar	Dravida Munnetra Kazhagam
2021	K. S. Saravana Kumar	Dravida Munnetra Kazhagam
2026	Sabari Iyngaran G	Tamilaga Vettri Kazhagam

^by-election

== Election results ==
Vote share of winning candidates
2026	40.56%
2021	45.71%
2019 by-election	42.20%
2016	46.94%
2011	47.86%
2006	49.78%
2001	54.28%
1996	46.75%
1991	67.45%
1989	34.15%
1984	63.04%
1980	54.01%
1977	45.50%
1971	56.85%
1967	54.85%
1952	24.98%

=== 2026 ===
2026 Tamil Nadu Legislative Assembly election: Periyakulam
Party	Candidate	Votes	%	±%
TVK	Sabari Iyngaran G	85,656	40.56	New
VCK	Sakthivel P	66,335	31.41	New
AMMK	Dr Kathirkamu K	44,521	21.08	▲12.84
NTK	Vimala R	9,610	4.55	▼1.37
NOTA	NOTA	1,506	0.71	▼0.52
Margin of victory		19,321	9.15	▼1.55
Turnout		2,11,209		
Rejected ballots				
Registered electors		263,547		
TVK gain from DMK		Swing		

=== 2021 ===
2021 Tamil Nadu Legislative Assembly election: Periyakulam
Party	Candidate	Votes	%	±%
DMK	K. S. Saravana Kumar	92,251	46.28	+6.77
AIADMK	M. Murugan	70,930	35.58	−11.36
AMMK	Dr. K. Kathirkamu	16,424	8.24	New
NTK	Vimala	11,794	5.92	+5.37
MNM	S. Pandiyarajan	5,680	2.85	New
NOTA	NOTA	2,451	1.23	+0.05
Margin of victory		21,321	10.70	3.26
Turnout		199,346	69.83	−5.11
Rejected ballots		10	0.01	
Registered electors		285,471		
DMK hold		Swing	-0.66	

=== 2019 by-election ===
2019 Tamil Nadu Legislative Assembly by-elections: Periyakulam
Party	Candidate	Votes	%	±%
DMK	K. S. Saravana Kumar	88,393		
AIADMK	M. Mayilvel	68,073		
AMMK	Dr. K. Kathirkamu	26,338		
NTK	Shobana	5,825		
MNM	Prabhu	5,727		
Majority		20,320		
Turnout		1,96,622	73.98	
Registered electors		2,68,739		
DMK gain from AIADMK		Swing		

=== 2016 ===
2016 Tamil Nadu Legislative Assembly election: Periyakulam
Party	Candidate	Votes	%	±%
AIADMK	Dr. K. Kathirkamu	90,599	46.94	New
DMK	Anbazhagan	76,249	39.51	−4.83
CPI(M)	A. Laser	13,525	7.01	−40.85
BJP	K. Chellam	5,015	2.60	+0.46
NOTA	NOTA	2,275	1.18	New
NTK	M. Pushpalatha	1,048	0.54	New
PMK	R. Kannan	1,025	0.53	New
Margin of victory		14,350	7.43	3.91
Turnout		193,010	74.94	−3.94
Registered electors		257,555		
AIADMK gain from CPI(M)		Swing	-0.92	

=== 2011 ===
2011 Tamil Nadu Legislative Assembly election: Periyakulam
Party	Candidate	Votes	%	±%
CPI(M)	A. Laser	76,687	47.86	New
DMK	V. Anbazhagan	71,046	44.34	+5.36
BJP	M. Ganapathy	3,422	2.14	+1.34
Independent	M. Selvam	2,347	1.46	New
Independent	P. Rajaguru	1,260	0.79	New
TMMK	P. Nalluchamy	1,129	0.70	New
Independent	N. Krishnaveni	872	0.54	New
Independent	K. Palanichami	830	0.52	New
Margin of victory		5,641	3.52	−7.28
Turnout		160,242	78.88	8.84
Registered electors		203,137		
CPI(M) gain from AIADMK		Swing	-1.93	

=== 2006 ===
2006 Tamil Nadu Legislative Assembly election: Periyakulam
Party	Candidate	Votes	%	±%
AIADMK	O. Panneerselvam	68,345	49.78	−4.49
DMK	L. Mookiah	53,511	38.98	+0.36
DMDK	M. Abdul Kather	11,105	8.09	New
BJP	P. Rajapandiyan	1,097	0.80	New
BSP	G. Senthil Kumar	907	0.66	New
Margin of victory		14,834	10.81	−4.85
Turnout		137,287	70.05	13.91
Registered electors		195,988		
AIADMK hold		Swing	-4.49	

=== 2001 ===
2001 Tamil Nadu Legislative Assembly election: Periyakulam
Party	Candidate	Votes	%	±%
AIADMK	O. Panneerselvam	62,125	54.28	+26.69
DMK	M. Abuthahir	44,205	38.62	−8.13
MDMK	A. Jeyaraman	5,965	5.21	−4.48
Independent	K. Beerkabeef	1,222	1.07	New
Margin of victory		17,920	15.66	−3.51
Turnout		114,463	56.14	−10.42
Registered electors		203,946		
AIADMK gain from DMK		Swing	7.53	

=== 1996 ===
1996 Tamil Nadu Legislative Assembly election: Periyakulam
Party	Candidate	Votes	%	±%
DMK	L. Mookiah	53,427	46.75	+19.38
AIADMK	K. M. Kader Mohideen	31,520	27.58	−39.86
MDMK	O. Rajangam	11,076	9.69	New
Independent	P. Muthumanickam	9,988	8.74	New
AIIC(T)	A. Sharuz Ameed	3,645	3.19	New
BJP	V. A. Sethumanickam	2,379	2.08	−1.19
Margin of victory		21,907	19.17	−20.90
Turnout		114,283	66.56	5.39
Registered electors		177,436		
DMK gain from AIADMK		Swing	-20.70	

=== 1991 ===
1991 Tamil Nadu Legislative Assembly election: Periyakulam
Party	Candidate	Votes	%	±%
AIADMK	M. Periyaveeran	70,760	67.45	+39.63
DMK	L. Mookiah	28,718	27.37	−6.78
BJP	P. Annavi	3,431	3.27	New
PMK	A. Kennedy	930	0.89	New
Margin of victory		42,042	40.07	34.65
Turnout		104,915	61.17	−8.27
Registered electors		175,072		
AIADMK gain from DMK		Swing	33.29	

=== 1989 ===
1989 Tamil Nadu Legislative Assembly election: Periyakulam
Party	Candidate	Votes	%	±%
DMK	L. Mookiah	35,215	34.15	−0.13
INC	S. Sheik Abdul Khadar	29,622	28.73	New
AIADMK	S.S.Rajendran	28,686	27.82	−35.22
Independent	V. Abdul Farook	7,311	7.09	New
Independent	M. Mehta	561	0.54	New
Margin of victory		5,593	5.42	−23.33
Turnout		103,114	69.44	−1.62
Registered electors		151,319		
DMK gain from AIADMK		Swing	-28.88	

=== 1984 ===
1984 Tamil Nadu Legislative Assembly election: Periyakulam
Party	Candidate	Votes	%	±%
AIADMK	T. Mohammed Saleem	58,021	63.04	+9.03
DMK	P. N. Maya Thevar Alias Mayan	31,554	34.28	New
Independent	K. Ayyathurai	1,304	1.42	New
Margin of victory		26,467	28.75	17.85
Turnout		92,044	71.06	6.27
Registered electors		133,765		
AIADMK hold		Swing	9.03	

=== 1980 ===
1980 Tamil Nadu Legislative Assembly election: Periyakulam
Party	Candidate	Votes	%	±%
AIADMK	K. Gopala Krishana	43,774	54.01	+8.5
INC	K. Sheik Abdul Kader	34,938	43.11	+18.44
JP	R. Kamatchi	1,149	1.42	New
Independent	K. Palanichamy	640	0.79	New
Margin of victory		8,836	10.90	−9.94
Turnout		81,051	64.78	3.28
Registered electors		126,755		
AIADMK hold		Swing	8.50	

=== 1977 ===
1977 Tamil Nadu Legislative Assembly election: Periyakulam
Party	Candidate	Votes	%	±%
AIADMK	K. Pannai Sethuram	31,271	45.50	New
INC	R. Ramaiah	16,948	24.66	−17.8
DMK	M. Mehta	13,069	19.02	−37.83
JP	M. V. V. Ramasamy	7,432	10.81	New
Margin of victory		14,323	20.84	6.46
Turnout		68,720	61.51	−11.85
Registered electors		113,238		
AIADMK gain from DMK		Swing	-11.34	

=== 1971 ===
1971 Tamil Nadu Legislative Assembly election: Periyakulam
Party	Candidate	Votes	%	±%
DMK	N. Anbuchezhian	37,926	56.85	+1.99
INC	Chettai Chinnasamy	28,331	42.46	−2.68
Independent	Fakir Mohamad	461	0.69	New
Margin of victory		9,595	14.38	4.67
Turnout		66,718	73.36	−3.17
Registered electors		98,811		
DMK hold		Swing	1.99	

=== 1967 ===
1967 Madras Legislative Assembly election: Periyakulam
Party	Candidate	Votes	%	±%
DMK	K. M. M. Metha	36,023	54.85	New
INC	R. S. Subramaniam	29,648	45.15	New
Margin of victory		6,375	9.71	
Turnout		65,671	76.53	
Registered electors		88,498		
DMK win (new seat)				

=== 1952 ===
1952 Madras Legislative Assembly election: Periyakulam
Party	Candidate	Votes	%	±%
INC	V. Muthu	38,143	24.98	New
AIFB	P. K. Mookiah Thevar	36,515	23.91	New
INC	N. R. Thygarajan	31,188	20.43	New
Socialist Party (India)	Ponnuchami	9,973	6.53	New
Independent	Guruswami Naicker	9,315	6.10	New
KMPP	Paramasiva Thevar	8,353	5.47	New
Socialist Party (India)	Ramalingam Chetty	7,019	4.60	New
KMPP	Sankaramurthi	5,925	3.88	New
Independent	John Devadasam	3,222	2.11	New
Independent	Mayandi Thevar	3,035	1.99	New
Margin of victory		1,628	1.07	
Turnout		152,688	100.57	
Registered electors		151,823		
INC win (new seat)				
