= M. R. Pallavi =

Indian politician

M. R. Pallavi (born 1990) is an Indian politician from Tamil Nadu. She is a Member of the Legislative Assembly from Thiru. Vi. Ka. Nagar Assembly constituency which is reserved for Scheduled Community in Chennai district representing the Tamilaga Vettri Kazhagam.

Pallavi became an MLA for the first time winning her debut in the 2026 Tamil Nadu Legislative Assembly election from Thiru-Vi-Ka-Nagar Assembly constituency representing the Tamilaga Vettri Kazhagam. She defeated K. S. Ravichandran of the Dravida Munnetra Kazhagam (DMK), and won by a margin of 22,333 votes.
