= P. K. Sekar Babu =

Indian politician

Cabinet Minister Government of Tamil Nadu
- In office 7 May 2021 – 5 May 2026
- Minister: Minister of Hindu Religious and Charitable Endowments
- Chief Minister: M. K. Stalin
- Preceded by: Sevvoor S. Ramachandran
- Succeeded by: S. Ramesh

Member of the Tamil Nadu Legislative Assembly
- Incumbent
- Assumed office 19 May 2016
- Preceded by: Pala. Karuppiah
- Constituency: Harbour
- In office 13 May 2001 – 13 May 2011
- Preceded by: S. P. Sarguna Pandian
- Succeeded by: P. Vetrivel
- Constituency: Radhakrishnan Nagar

Personal details
- Born: 10 January 1963 (age 63) Madras, Madras State (present-day Chennai, Tamil Nadu)
- Party: Dravida Munnetra Kazhagam
- Other political affiliations: Anna Dravida Munnetra Kazhagam
- Spouse: S. Santhi
- Children: P. S. Vignesh; P. S. Jeya Kalyani; P. S. Jeyasimhan

P. K. Sekar Babu is an Indian politician and Member of the Legislative Assembly of Tamil Nadu, and he was the Minister of Hindu Religious and Charitable Endowments Department in Stalin ministry. Currently, he is elected to the Tamil Nadu Legislative Assembly from Harbour as a Dravida Munnetra Kazhagam candidate in 2016, 2021 and 2026 elections. He won his first two elections in 2001 and 2006 from R K Nagar constituency as an AIADMK candidate.

== Political career ==
He joined Dravida Munnetra Kazhagam from Anna Dravida Munnetra Kazhagam in January 2011. However, he lost the 2011 election that took place shortly thereafter in April.

=== 2016 and 2021 state assembly elections ===
In the 2016 Tamil Nadu Legislative Assembly election, Sekar Babu contested on behalf of the DMK and won the election, he polled 42,071 votes and defeated his rival AIADMK candidate KS Srinivasan by a margin of 4,836 votes.

=== As a Minister ===
In the 2021 Tamil Nadu Legislative Assembly election, he won from Harbour constituency polling 59,317 votes, giving a winning margin of 27274 votes.

Sekar Babu in May 2021, said that the ruling DMK will work for North Indian residents in the state even if they did not vote for the party over the years. He claimed that even though the North Indians grew rich because of the ruling Dravidian parties and yet they still voted for the BJP. He also said that his party sees the North Indians, as people from Tamil Nadu and one among them.

Sekar Babu toured around the state taking action to reclaim the occupied temple land around Tamil Nadu. He reclaimed the illegally occupied land by a Hindu Mahasabha leader in July 2020.

Under his ministerial leadership, non-Brahmin priests were appointed to temples managed by HRCE by Chief minister M. K. Stalin. Sekar Babu said it was Periyar's dream, that persons of all castes should become priests at temples, and it was former Chief Minister M. Karunanidhi who had made it a reality.

Sekar Babu on October highlights of 2021 broke bread with a Narikuruva woman in the same temple feast she complained of being chased away from when staff at Sthalasaina Temple allegedly instructed her to leave, and later collect leftover food.

== Electoral performance ==
Election	Party	Constituency Name	Result	Votes gained	Vote share%
2001	Anna Dravida Munnetra Kazhagam	Radhakrishnan Nagar	Won	74,888	58.43%
2006	Anna Dravida Munnetra Kazhagam	Radhakrishnan Nagar	Won	84,462	50.36%
2011	Dravida Munnetra Kazhagam	Radhakrishnan Nagar	Lost	52,522	37.01%
2016	Dravida Munnetra Kazhagam	Harbour	Won	42,071	40.36%
2021	Dravida Munnetra Kazhagam	Harbour	Won	59,317	58.88%
2026	Dravida Munnetra Kazhagam	Harbour	Won	45,254	45.43%
