= A. Soundararajan =

Indian politician

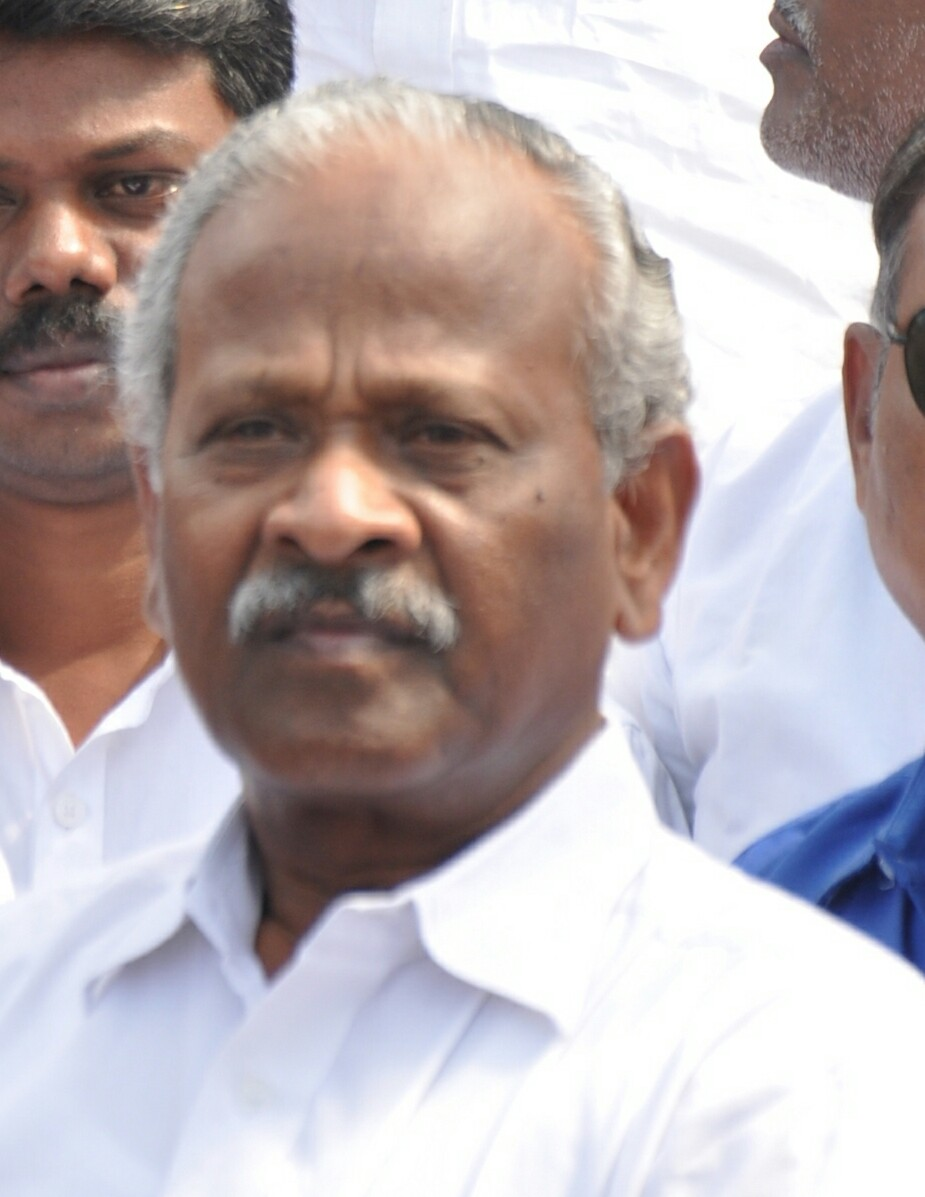

Member of the Tamil Nadu Legislative Assembly
- In office 23 May 2011 – 21 May 2016
- Preceded by: K. Mahendran
- Succeeded by: P. Vetrivel
- Constituency: Perambur

Personal details
- Party: Communist Party of India (Marxist)

A. Soundararajan is an Indian politician and was a member of the 14th Tamil Nadu Legislative Assembly from the Perambur constituency in Chennai District. He represented the Communist Party of India (Marxist) party. He is working with Centre of Indian Trade Unions (CITU).

The elections of 2016 resulted in his constituency being won by P. Vetriivel.
