= V. Rajasekaran =

Member-Tamil Nadu Legislative Assembly.
- In office 1980–1984
- Preceded by: Isari Velan
- Succeeded by: S. Venugopal
- Constituency: Radhakrishnan Nagar

Personal details
- Born: 14 April 1938 Sivagangai
- Party: Indian National Congress
- Profession: Farmer

V. Rajasekaran is an Indian politician and a former member of the Tamil Nadu Legislative Assembly. He hails from the Sivaganga district and currently resides in Chennai. He completed his high school final examination (SSLC) at Raja High School, Sivaganga. A member of the Indian National Congress party, he contested and won the election to the Tamil Nadu Legislative Assembly from the Dr. Radhakrishnan Nagar Assembly constituency in the 1980 state election, thereby becoming a Member of Legislative Assembly (MLA).

== Electoral Performance ==
=== 1980 ===
1980 Tamil Nadu Legislative Assembly election: Dr. Radhakrishnan Nagar
Party	Candidate	Votes	%	±%
INC	V. Rajasekaran	44,076	48.62%	+36.26
AIADMK	Isari Velan	36,888	40.69%	+5.12
JP	K. Arumugasamy	8,685	9.58%	New
Margin of victory		7,188	7.93%	6.07%
Turnout		90,648	62.36%	17.19%
Registered electors		146,769		
INC gain from AIADMK		Swing	13.05%	
