= N. Marie Wilson =

Indian politician

Minister for Finance Planning and Development
- Incumbent
- Assumed office 21 May 2026
- Governor: Rajendra Arlekar
- Chief Minister: C. Joseph Vijay
- Ministry and Departments: Finance, Pensions and Pensionary benefits, Planning & Development

Member of the Tamil Nadu Legislative Assembly
- Incumbent
- Assumed office 4 May 2026
- Constituency: Radhakrishnan Nagar

Personal details
- Born: c. 1979 Chennai, Tamil Nadu, India
- Party: Tamilaga Vettri Kazhagam
- Parent: Nestore (father)
- Education: B.Tech; MBA; Ph.D.
- Alma mater: Jawaharlal Nehru Technological University, Hyderabad

Nestore Marie Wilson (born c. 1979) is an Indian politician from Tamil Nadu. He is a member of the Tamil Nadu Legislative Assembly, elected from the Radhakrishnan Nagar Assembly constituency in Chennai district in the 2026 Tamil Nadu Legislative Assembly election, representing the Tamilaga Vettri Kazhagam (TVK).

== Early life and education ==
Wilson is from Chennai, Tamil Nadu. His father is Nestore. He is associated with the Jeppiaar group of educational institutions in Tamil Nadu. He earned a B.Tech. degree and an MBA, followed by a doctorate (Ph.D.) in management science from Jawaharlal Nehru Technological University, Hyderabad, awarded in 2012.

== Career ==
=== Educational administration ===
Wilson has been Chairman of Jeppiaar Institute of Technology, Sriperumbudur.

=== Political career ===
Wilson joined the Tamilaga Vettri Kazhagam on 9 June 2025 under advise of Aadhav Arjuna who was close friend to him, in a batch that also included former IRS officer K.G. Arunraj, former judicial officer C. Subash, and former MLAs R. Rajalakshmi, S. David Selvan and Dr. A. Sridharan.

On 23 November 2025, TVK leader Vijay addressed approximately 2,000 cadres at the Jeppiaar Institute of Technology campus in an indoor closed-door meeting — the party's first such event following the 27 September 2025 Karur stampede incident.

Wilson was named TVK's candidate for Radhakrishnan Nagar when the party released its full 234-seat candidate list on 29–30 March 2026. Polling in the constituency took place on 23 April 2026. On 4 May 2026, Wilson was declared elected to the Tamil Nadu Legislative Assembly, defeating the sitting MLA, J. John Ebenezer of the Dravida Munnetra Kazhagam, by a margin of 49,668 votes. Wilson polled 97,800 votes.

== Controversies ==
=== Cheating and intimidation allegations ===
In April 2026, Vignesh Ram filed a formal complaint against Wilson at the Chennai Police Commissioner's Office. The complainant, who stated he had supplied bulk grocery items to educational institutions managed by Wilson between 2017 and 2019, alleged that payments totaling approximately ₹1.10 crore remained unsettled. Furthermore, the complainant alleged that he had been subjected to criminal intimidation, wrongful restraint and abusive language by Wilson's associates when attempting to recover the outstanding dues. The complaint requested a police investigation and protection, alleging that the institution's management had warned him against pursuing the matter.

=== Trespass and assault allegations ===
During the 2026 election campaign, a video circulated on social media platforms featuring Wilson in a violent confrontation with a family. The footage, which received widespread attention online, showed Wilson engaged in a heated argument and violent actions. Critics and opposition voices used the footage to characterize Wilson's conduct as inappropriate for a political candidate, while supporters of his party often dismissed the incident as a private family matter or urged observers to withhold judgment pending full context. The incident became a subject of political debate regarding the candidate vetting process of the Tamilaga Vettri Kazhagam. Furthermore, in March 2026, the Madras High Court upheld an order for further investigation into a 2022 case involving allegations of trespassing and assault.

== Electoral history ==
Election	Constituency	Party	Votes	Margin	Result
2026	Radhakrishnan Nagar	Tamilaga Vettri Kazhagam	97,800	49,668	Won
