= Devendrar College of Physiotherapy =

College in Tamil Nadu, India

- தேவேந்திரர் உடலியக்க மருத்துவக் கல்லூரி
- Motto: "Abide, Acquire, Achieve"
- Type: Private
- Established: 1998
- Affiliations: Dr. M.G.R. Medical University
- Endowment: Devendra Educational and Charitable Trust
- Chairman: B. John Pandian
- Principal: B.Ganesan
- Location: Ariyakulam Tirunelveli Tamil Nadu, India; 8°42′55″N 77°47′59″E
- Website: devendrareducation.com

Devendrar College of Physiotherapy (Tamil:தேவேந்திரர் உடலியக்க மருத்துவக் கல்லூரி), is a physiotherapy medical college in South India, located in the city of Tirunelveli, Ariyakulam in the state of Tamil Nadu, India. It is affiliated to Tamil Nadu Dr. M.G.R. Medical University.

== History ==
Devendrar College of Physiotherapy was established in the year 1998 and is affiliated to Tamil Nadu Dr. M.G.R. Medical University. The chairman is B. John Pandian, the president of Tamizhaga Makkal Munnetra Kazhagam political party. The college has become one of the top physiotherapy teaching and research training institution in Tamil Nadu. Devendrar College of Physiotherapy is managed by Devendrar Educational and Charitable Trust.

Devendrar College of Physiotherapy, Tirunelveli offers bachelor's degree in the field of physiotherapy. The undergraduate course in physiotherapy imparts in-depth knowledge and skill to a student to become competent in the techniques and develop the proper attitude required for the practice of physiotherapy and carry out treatment prescribed by a physician. The duration of certified extends over a period of four academic years and six months of compulsory internship. The area of this permanent building is 15,000 sq ft (1,400 m^{2}), surrounded by 60 acres (24 ha).

== Special features ==
The Devendrar College of Physiotherapy Tirunelveli has a library containing books, journals, and periodicals related to the physiotherapy field. Separate hostel facility is available for the students. Guest speakers from various specialists visit periodically for conducting seminars and workshops.
