= Tamizhaga Makkal Munnetra Kazhagam =

Tamizhaga Makkal Munnetra Kazhagam தமிழக மக்கள் முன்னேற்றக் கழகம்
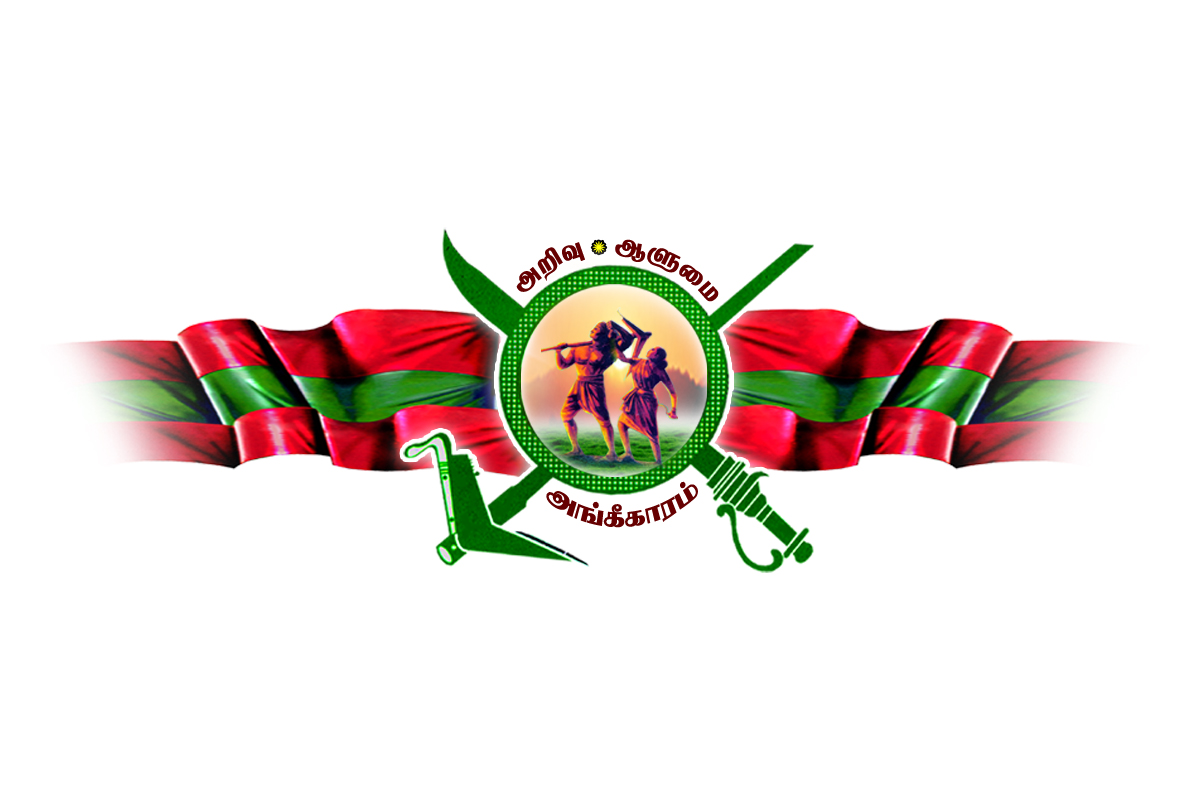
- Abbreviation: TMMK
- President: B. John Pandian
- Founder: B. John Pandian
- Founded: 14 April 2000
- Headquarters: 563, Shanti Colony, M.K.P Nagar, Palayamkottai, Tirunelveli, Tamil Nadu, India
- Student wing: TMMK Ilaignarani
- Youth wing: TMMK Youth Wing
- Ideology: Nationalism; Social equity
- Political position: Centre-right
- Colours: Red; Green
- Alliance: AIADMK-led Alliance (2001–2004) (2019-2024, 2025-2026); NDA (2017–2026); Democratic Progressive Alliance (2004-2009); Bahujan Samaj Party (2009-2011); Indhiya Jananayaga Katchi (2011)
- Seats in Rajya Sabha: 0 / 245
- Seats in Lok Sabha: 0 / 543
- Seats in Tamil Nadu Legislative Assembly: 0 / 234
- Number of states and union territories in government: 0 / 31

Party flag
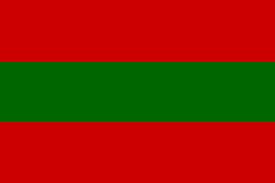

Tamizhaga Makkal Munnetra Kazhagam (Tamil People's Progressive Federation) is a political party in the Indian state of Tamil Nadu. It was founded in 2000.

== History ==
The party was founded by B. John Pandian in 2000. It is a caste-based political party in Tamil Nadu.

== Electoral history ==
=== 2001 Tamil Nadu Legislative Assembly election ===
In the 2001 Tamil Nadu Legislative Assembly election, the party joined the AIADMK-led Alliance and was allotted Egmore constituency to be contested on "Twin-leaves" symbol. The party fielded its founder John Pandian in the seat. But he lost the seat to Parithi Ilamvazhuthi by a slender margin of 86 votes in its maiden election.

=== 2011 Tamil Nadu Legislative Assembly election ===
In the 2011 Tamil Nadu Legislative Assembly election, the party opted to join the Third front led by Indhiya Jananayaga Katchi led by T. R. Paarivendhar comprising Tamizhaga Makkal Munnetra Kazhagam, Samooka Samathuva Padai, Tamil Nadu Vanigar Peravai and VOC Peravai. The front fielded candidates in more than 150 constituencies.

=== 2016 Tamil Nadu Legislative Assembly election ===
In the 2016 Tamil Nadu Legislative Assembly election, the party contested 52 seats in "Pot" symbol with John Pandian contesting in the Tiruvadanai Assembly constituency. But the party faced defeat in all constituencies which it contested. It also formed alliance with Marudham Makkal Katchi headed by former MLA Soundarapandian and Bharatiya Vikasha Shakti party for the elections allotting five and two seats to them respectively.

=== 2019 Lok Sabha election ===
The demand for merging the subsects of Scheduled Caste in the state of Tamilnadu such as Pallar, Devendrakulathar, Pannadi, Kaladi, Vathiriyar and Kudumbar into a single entity as Devendrakula Velalar gained pace along with the delisting of those subsects to Other Backward Class. The party joined the National Democratic Alliance in 2017. The party supported the alliance in 2019 Indian general election.

=== 2021 Tamil Nadu Legislative Assembly election ===
The party was allotted one seat in the alliance for the 2021 Tamil Nadu Legislative Assembly election. After 20 years, B. John Pandian once again contested the Egmore constituency and lost it. Post the election, the party left AIADMK-led Alliance citing differences over seat sharing in the election. However it continued its partnership in the National Democratic Alliance.

=== 2024 Lok Sabha election ===
As a part of NDA alliance, the party was allocated to contest the Tenkasi Lok Sabha constituency seat under the symbol of the Bharatiya Janata Party. However, the candidate, B. John Pandian failed to win the seat but polled 208,825 votes.

== List of party leaders ==
=== Presidents ===
No.	Portrait	Name	Term in office		
No.	Portrait	Name	Assumed office	Left office	Time in office
1		B. John Pandian (1955–)	14 April 2000	Incumbent	26 years, 69 days

== Election history ==
=== Tamil Nadu Legislative Assembly ===
Year	Party leader	Alliance	Seats contested	Seats won	Seats +/-	Vote % (in Tamil Nadu)	Total Votes Polled	Vote swing
2001	B. John Pandian	AIADMK+	1	0 / 234	Steady	0.19%	33,103	▲0.19
2011	B. John Pandian	Third Front	50	0 / 234	Steady	0.40%	146,454	▲0.21
2016	B. John Pandian	None	1	0 / 234	Steady		28,855	Steady
2021	B. John Pandian	NDA	1	0 / 234	Steady	0.07%	30,064	Steady

=== Lok Sabha ===
Year	Party leader	Alliance	Seats contested	Seats won	Seats +/-	Vote % (in Tamil Nadu)	Total Votes Polled	Vote swing
2024	B. John Pandian	NDA	1	0 / 543	Steady	0.48%	208,825	▲0.48
