= K. Nalla Thambi =

Indian politician

Member of the Tamil Nadu Legislative Assembly
- In office 23 May 2011 – 21 May 2016
- Preceded by: Parithi Ilamvazhuthi
- Succeeded by: K. S. Ravichandran
- Constituency: Egmore

Personal details
- Party: Desiya Murpokku Dravida Kazhagam

K. Nalla Thambi is an Indian politician and was a member of the 14th Tamil Nadu Legislative Assembly from the Egmore Constituency in Chennai District, which is reserved for candidates from the Scheduled Castes. He represented the Desiya Murpokku Dravida Kazhagam party.

The elections of 2016 resulted in his constituency being won by K. S. Ravichandran.
