= R. D. Shekar =

Indian politician

Member of the Tamil Nadu Legislative Assembly
- In office May 2019 – May 2026
- Preceded by: P. Vetrivel
- Succeeded by: C. Joseph Vijay
- Constituency: Perambur

Personal details
- Party: Dravida Munnetra Kazhagam

R. D. Shekar is an Indian politician and was a Member of the Legislative Assembly of Tamil Nadu. He was elected to the Tamil Nadu legislative assembly as a Dravida Munnetra Kazhagam candidate from Perambur constituency in the by-election in 2019.

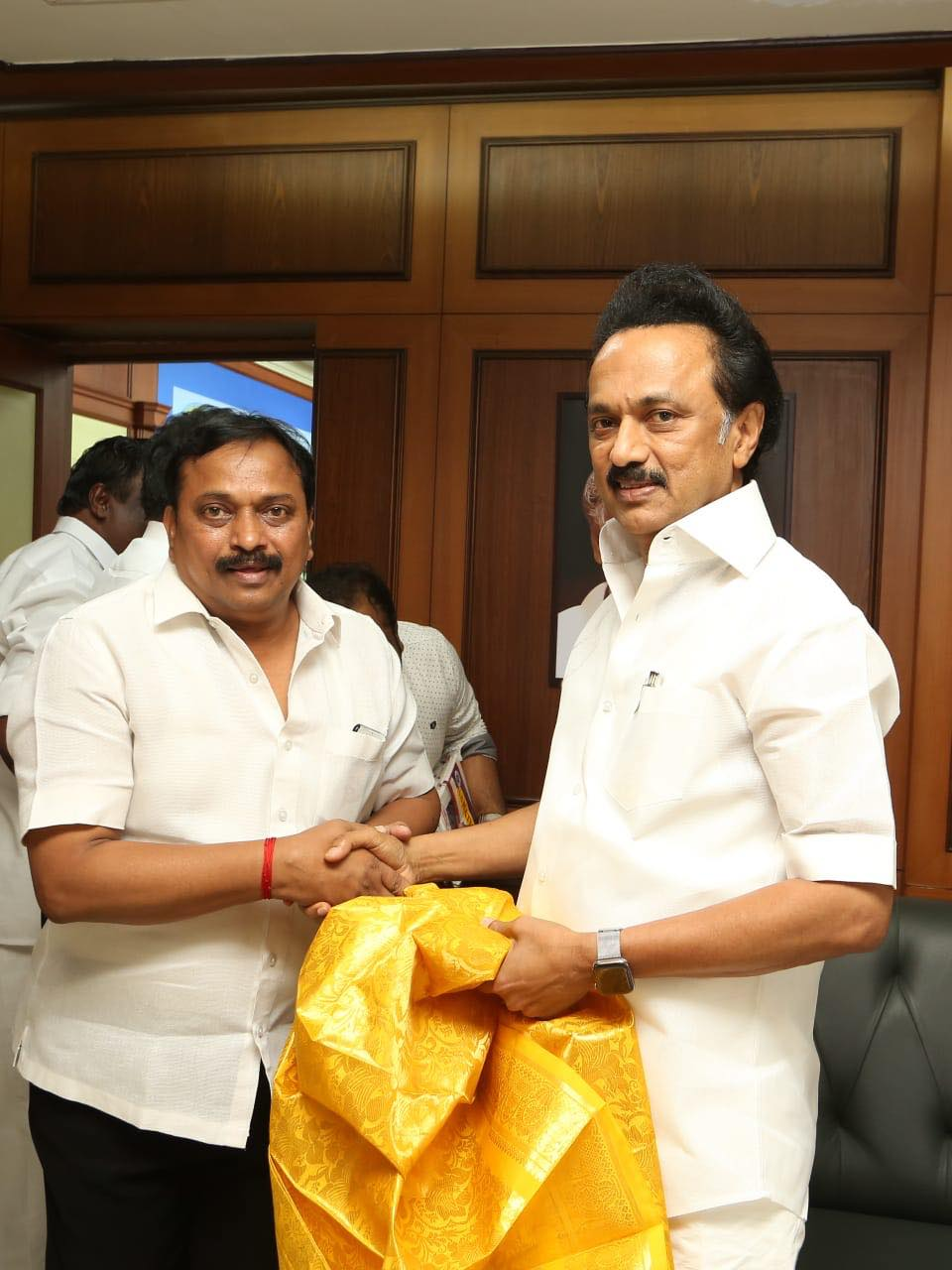
R.D.Shekar MLA is a former Member of the Legislative Assembly of Tamil Nadu.

R. D. Shekar was elected as the Member of Legislative Assembly of Tamil Nadu in bypoll held at Perambur Assembly Constituency in April 2019 following the disqualification of the legislator who was elected in 2016. The by-poll was held in April 2019.

== Electoral performance ==
Election	Party	Constituency Name	Result	Votes gained	Vote share%
2026	Dravida Munnetra Kazhagam	Perambur	Lost	66,650	32.61%
2021	Dravida Munnetra Kazhagam	Perambur	Won	105,267	52.93%
2019	Dravida Munnetra Kazhagam	Perambur	Won	106,394	56.32%
