= Sathyavani Muthu =

Indian politician

- சத்தியவாணி முத்து

Union Minister of Social Welfare
- In office 19 August 1979 – 23 December 1979
- President: Neelam Sanjiva Reddy
- Prime Minister: Charan Singh
- Preceded by: Karan Singh
- Succeeded by: Shankarrao Chavan

Minister of Harijan Welfare, Tamil Nadu
- In office 6 March 1967 – 4 May 1974
- Chief Minister: CN Annadurai VR Nedunchezhiyan (interim) M Karunanidhi
- Preceded by: P. Kakkan
- Succeeded by: N. Rajangam

Minister of Agriculture, Tamil Nadu
- In office 8 August 1969 – 14 March 1971
- Chief Minister: M Karunanidhi
- Preceded by: A. Govindaswamy
- Succeeded by: Anbil P. Dharmalingam

Member of Parliament, Rajya Sabha
- In office 3 April 1978 – 2 April 1984
- Prime Minister: Morarji Desai; Charan Singh; Indira Gandhi
- Preceded by: K. A. Krishnaswamy
- Succeeded by: J. Jayalalithaa
- Constituency: Tamil Nadu

Personal details
- Born: 15 February 1923
- Died: 11 November 1999 (aged 76)
- Party: Dravida Munnetra Kazhagam (1949–1974), (1989–1999)
- Other political affiliations: All India Anna Dravida Munnetra Kazhagam (1977–1989); Thazhthapattor Munnetra Kazhagam(1974–1977)

Sathyavani Muthu (15 February 1923 – 11 November 1999) was an Indian politician and influential leader from Chennai, Tamil Nadu. She was a Member of the Legislative Assembly of Tamil Nadu, Rajya Sabha member and Union Minister. She began her political career as a member of Dravida Munnetra Kazhagam, began her own party, Thazhthapattor Munnetra Kazhagam and later joined the All India Anna Dravida Munnetra Kazhagam. In late 1980s, she again joined in DMK.

== Member of Legislative assembly ==
She was a member of Dravida Munnetra Kazhagam (DMK) since its beginning in 1949. In 1953, she was arrested for leading the DMK's protests against the Kula Kalvi Thittam. During 1958-59, she was the propaganda secretary of the party. She also served as the editor of the magazine Annai (lit. mother) She contested assembly elections from Perambur and Ulundurpet constituencies in all assembly elections between 1957 and 1977 and 1984. She won three times from Perambur constituency as an Independent candidate in the 1957 election, as a Dravida Munnetra Kazhagam candidate in the 1967, and 1971 elections. She lost the 1962 election from Perambur and the 1977 election from Ulundurpet constituency.

=== Electoral history ===
Election	Constituency	Winner	Votes	Party	Runner-up	Votes	Party	Status
1957	Perambur	1) Pakkiriswami Pillai; 3) Sathyavani Muthu	34,579; 27,638	IND; IND	2) T. S. Govindaswamy; 4) T. Rajagopal (SC)	31,806; 23,682	INC; INC	Won
1962	Perambur	D. Sulochana	40,451	INC	Sathyavani Muthu	32,309	DMK	Lost
1967	Perambur	Sathyavani Muthu	40,364	DMK	D. Sulochana	33,677	INC	Won
1971	Perambur	Sathyavani Muthu	49,070	DMK	D. Sulochana	37,047	NCO	Won
1977	Ulundurpet	V. Thulakkanam	26,788	DMK	Sathyavani Muthu	19,211	ADMK	Lost
1984	Perambur	Parithi Ilamvazhuthi	53,325	DMK	Sathyavani Muthu	46,121	ADMK	Lost

== Tamil Nadu minister ==
She served as a minister for Harijan welfare and Information during C. N. Annadurai administration in Tamil Nadu from 1967 to 1969. She again served as a Harijan welfare minister in M. Karunanidhi administration till 1974.

== Thazhthapattor Munnetra Kazhagam ==
She resigned her ministerial position in 1974 and left Dravida Munnetra Kazhagam. She claimed that Harijans are not treated well by DMK since the death of C. N. Annadurai and the new leader M. Karunanidhi was prejudiced against harijans. She said

The time has come to form a new party to fight for the rights of the Harijans. After Dr. Ambedkar, nobody has taken the cudgels in real earnest......We will form a new party, sit on the opposition benches, and fight for the rights of Schedules Castes. We will not let them be exploited and humiliated endlessly.

She formed Thazhthapattor Munnetra Kazhagam. The party was merged with Anna Dravida Munnetra Kazhagam after it came to power winning the 1977 election.

== Union minister ==
She served as a Rajya Sabha member as the All India Anna Dravida Munnetra Kazhagam representative from 3 April 1978 to 2 April 1984. She served as a Union Minister in Chaudhary Charan Singh ministry from 19 August 1979 to 23 December 1979. She along with A. Bala Pajanor were the first two non-Congress Dravidian parties and first regional party member Tamil Nadu politicians to serve in Union ministry.

== Book ==
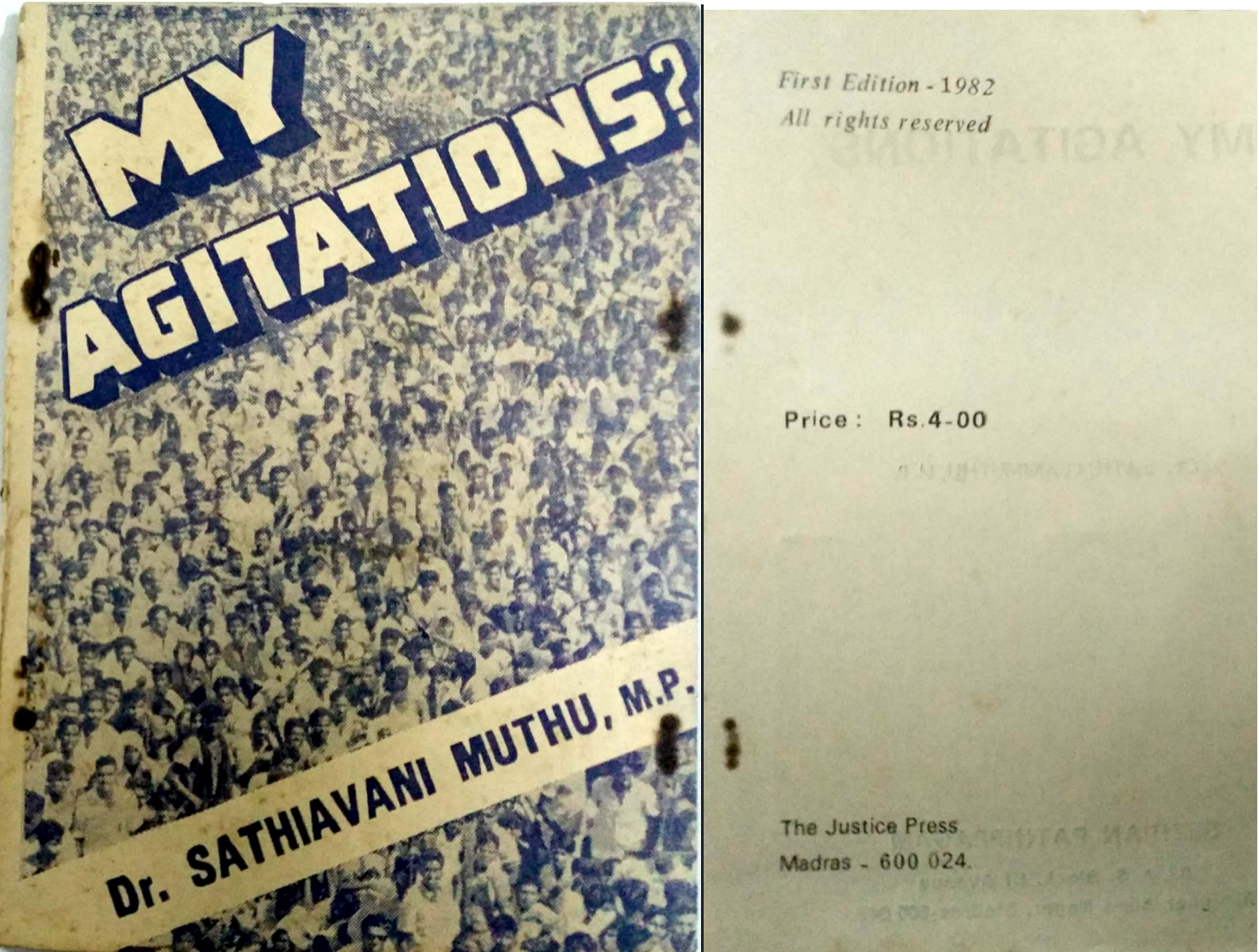
Cover page of the book My Agitations by Sathyavani Muthu

Sathyavani Muthu wrote about her struggles in a book titled My Agitations, which was published in 1982 by The Justice Press in Madras.
