= Parithi Ilamvazhuthi =

Indian politician

Minister of Information and Broadcasting (Government of Tamil Nadu)
- In office 13 May 2006 – 15 May 2011
- Chief Minister: M. Karunanidhi

Deputy Speaker of the Tamil Nadu Legislative Assembly
- In office 13 May 1996 – 13 May 2001

Member of the Tamil Nadu Legislative Assembly
- In office 25 January 1989 – 14 May 2011
- Constituency: Egmore
- In office 28 December 1984 – 30 January 1988
- Constituency: Perambur

Personal details
- Born: 11 November 1959 Chennai, Tamil Nadu, India
- Died: 13 October 2018 (aged 58)
- Party: Amma Makkal Munnetra Kazhagam
- Other political affiliations: Dravida Munnetra Kazhagam/All India Anna Dravida Munnetra Kazhagam
- Spouse: S. M. Lalitha
- Children: Dhilipan, Sandhya,,Indrajith
- Education: Wesley Higher Secondary School, Royapettah, Chennai
- Occupation: Politician

Parithi Ilamvazhuthi, also known as Parithi Ellamvazhuthi, (11 November 1959 – 13 October 2018) was an Indian politician. Born as Gandhi to Elamparithi and Kannammal. His father Elamparithi was a DMK High Command member during 1970s & 80s. At a very young age, he was attracted to the ideologies of DMK and chose to have political journey.

He completed his SSLC level at Wesley Higher Secondary School in Chennai before moving into political life. In 1983, at the age of 23, he addressed a DMK Meeting at Villivakkam, which was his turning point. He was first elected to the Tamil Nadu Legislative Assembly at the age of 25 when he defeated Sathyavani Muthu in the 1984 elections in the Perambur constituency. Subsequently, he was elected to the Tamil Nadu Legislative Assembly on six consecutive occasions between 1989 and 2011, all from the Egmore constituency, which is reserved for candidates from the Scheduled Castes. A candidate for the Dravida Munnetra Kazhagam (DMK) party during all of this time, he lost the Egmore seat in the 2011 assembly elections, when he was beaten by the Desiya Murpokku Dravida Kazhagam candidate, K. Nalla Thambi. The DMK was routed in the 1991 elections, held in the wake of Rajiv Gandhi's assassination, and he was one of the two MLAs from DMK to represent the party in the Assembly. Ilamvazhuthi, known for his oratory skills took on the AIADMK government single-handedly as the other DMK member, party patriarch, M Karunanidhi had resigned from his membership after winning from Harbour constituency in 1991. His performance in the Assembly greatly pleased the DMK High Command. As a result, he was made a Deputy Speaker in the 11th Assembly between 1996 and 2001 and was the Minister for Information Broadcasting and Publicity between 2006 and 2011. Referred to as the Indrajit and Veera Abhimanyu of the DMK by its leader, Karunanidhi, for his performances as the Opposition Member of the Legislative Assembly during 1991–1996, Ilamvazhuthi served as the Deputy General Secretary of the DMK. He was at ease with sharp, loaded Tamil, which he would use to advantage in the House. Often, it took other legislators some time to even figure out what he was actually saying. It was during this period that he started wearing trousers instead of dhoti, saying the former was a ‘safer’ attire, even as he departed from the norm of wearing dhotis.

Ilamvazhuthi moved from the DMK to the All India Anna Dravida Munnetra Kazhagam party on 28 June 2013 and was appointed a Chief Executive Committee Member the next day. He contested as an AIADMK candidate from Egmore Assembly Constituency in Tamil Nadu 2016 elections, but lost to DMK Candidate K. S. Ravichandran. After the demise of Madam J. Jayalalithaa, he joined the O. Paneerselvam Faction after the Dharmayuddham.After sometime he became a supporter of T.T.V. Dhinakaran and was the Organizing Secretary of Amma Makkal Munnetra Kazhagam till his death.
