= Carnamoyle =

Townland in County Donegal, Ireland

Carnamoyle is a townland in Inishowen, County Donegal, Ireland.

Running inland from the outskirts of the village of Muff to the slopes of the Inish Owen hills the townland is agricultural in nature.
