= E. Madhusudhanan =

Indian politician (died 2021)

7th Presidium Chairman of AIADMK
- In office 21 August 2017 – 5 August 2021
- Coordinator: O. Panneerselvam
- Joint Coordinator: Edappadi K. Palaniswami
- Preceded by: K. A. Sengottaiyan
- Succeeded by: A. Tamil Mahan Hussain
- In office 5 February 2007 – 10 February 2017
- General Secretary: J. Jayalalithaa; V. K. Sasikala
- Preceded by: K. Kalimuthu
- Succeeded by: K. A. Sengottaiyan

Minister of Handlooms and Textiles (Government of Tamil Nadu)
- In office 24 June 1991 – 12 May 1996
- Chief Minister: J. Jayalalithaa
- Constituency: Dr. Radhakrishnan Nagar

Member of Tamil Nadu Legislative Assembly
- In office 24 June 1991 – 12 May 1996
- Preceded by: S. P. Sarguna Pandian
- Succeeded by: S. P. Sarguna Pandian
- Constituency: Dr. Radhakrishnan Nagar

Personal details
- Born: 1 July 1941 Madras, Madras State, British Raj (now Chennai, Tamil Nadu, India)
- Died: 5 August 2021 (aged 80)
- Party: All India Anna Dravida Munnetra Kazhagam
- Occupation: Politician

E. Madhusudhanan (1 July 1941 - 5 August 2021) was a politician from the Indian state of Tamil Nadu.

Since 2007, he was the Presidium Chairman of the All India Anna Dravida Munnetra Kazhagam party till his death. One of the oldest party members of All India Anna Dravida Munnetra Kazhagam, since its inception he was also a former Minister in Jayalalitha cabinet and former spokesman. He was elected to the Tamil Nadu Legislative Assembly as an All India Anna Dravida Munnetra Kazhagam candidate from Dr. Radhakrishnan Nagar constituency in 1991 assembly election. He served as Minister of Handlooms and Textiles in First Jayalalithaa ministry.

== Electoral performance ==
2017 Tamil Nadu Legislative Assembly By-election: Dr. Radhakrishnan Nagar
Party	Candidate	Votes	%	±%
AMMK	T. T. V. Dhinakaran	89,013	50.32	N/A
AIADMK	E. Madhusudhnan	48,306	27.31	−28.56
DMK	N. Marudhu Ganesh	24,651	13.94	−19.2
NTK	Kalaikottuthayam	3,802	2.15	N/A
None of the Above	NOTA	2,373	1.34	−0.31
Margin of victory		40,707	23.01	+0.28
Turnout		1,76,890	77.68	+9.32
AMMK gain from AIADMK		Swing		

1991 Tamil Nadu Legislative Assembly election: Dr. Radhakrishnan Nagar
Party	Candidate	Votes	%	±%
AIADMK	E. Madhusudhanan	66,710	60.30%	+35.26
JD	V. Rajasekaran	41,758	37.74%	New
IUML	A. M. Gulam Huseien	941	0.85%	New
BJP	V. R. Jaganathan	636	0.57%	New
Margin of victory		24,952	22.55%	2.28%
Turnout		110,639	56.86%	−10.73%
Registered electors		199,052		
AIADMK gain from DMK		Swing	14.99%	

1989 Tamil Nadu Legislative Assembly election: Dr. Radhakrishnan Nagar
Party	Candidate	Votes	%	±%
DMK	S. P. Sarguna Pandian	54,216	45.31%	−1.81
AIADMK	E. Madhusudhanan	29,960	25.04%	New
Independent	V. Rajasekaran	20,731	17.32%	New
INC	Venugopal	12,863	10.75%	−39.96
Margin of victory		24,256	20.27%	16.68%
Turnout		119,660	67.59%	0.58%
Registered electors		179,625		
DMK gain from INC		Swing	-5.40%	
