= I. Paranthamen =

Indian politician

Member of the Tamil Nadu Legislative Assembly
- In office 2 May 2021 – 4 May 2026
- Preceded by: K. S. Ravichandran
- Succeeded by: Rajmohan Arumugam
- Constituency: Egmore

Personal details
- Party: Dravida Munnetra Kazhagam
- Spouse: Prema
- Children: I P Karikalan; I P Chezhiyan
- Education: Dr. Ambedkar Government Law College, Chennai
- Occupation: Advocate

I. Paranthamen is an Indian politician who is a Member of the Legislative Assembly of Tamil Nadu. He was elected to represent the Egmore constituency as a Dravida Munnetra Kazhagam candidate in 2021.

== Electoral performance ==
2021 Tamil Nadu Legislative Assembly election: Egmore
Party	Candidate	Votes	%	±%
DMK	I. Paranthamen	68,832	58.29	+12.64
AIADMK	B. John Pandian	30,064	25.46	−11.33
MNM	U. Priyadarsini	9,990	8.46	New
NTK	P. Geetha Lakshmi	6,276	5.31	+4.11
DMDK	T. Prabhu	1,293	1.09	−4.14
NOTA	NOTA	1,176	1.00	−1.36
Margin of victory		38,768	32.83	23.98
Turnout		1,18,095	43.09	−19.91
Rejected ballots		179	0.15	
Registered electors		2,74,096		
DMK hold		Swing	12.64	

2016 Tamil Nadu Legislative Assembly election : Poonamallee
Party	Candidate	Votes	%	±%
AIADMK	T. A. Elumalai	103,952	43.32%	▼11.27
DMK	I. Paranthamen	92,189	38.41%	New
PMK	C. Parthasarathy	15,827	6.59%	New
MDMK	D. Kandan	15,051	6.27%	New
BJP	A. Amarnath	3,456	1.44%	New
NOTA	None of the above	3,265	1.36%	New
BSP	V. Vijayabalaji	2,066	0.86%	New
Margin of victory		11,763	4.90%	▼17.92
Turnout		240,126	76.06%	▲76.06
Total valid votes		239,987		
Rejected ballots		139	0.06%	
Registered electors		315,718		▲37.59
AIADMK hold		Swing	▼11.27	
