= S. Venugopal =

- ச. வேணுகோபால்

Member of the Tamil Nadu Legislative Assembly
- In office 1985–1989
- Preceded by: V. Rajasekaran
- Succeeded by: S. P. Sarguna Pandian
- Constituency: Dr. Radhakrishnan Nagar

Personal details
- Born: 18 January 1938 Chennai, Tamil Nadu, India
- Died: 7 April 2024 (aged 86)
- Party: Indian National Congress
- Profession: Agriculturist

S. Venugopal (18 January 1938 – 7 April 2024) was an Indian politician and a former member of the Tamil Nadu Legislative Assembly. He hailed from the Port area of Cuddalore district. Representing the Indian National Congress party, he contested and won the 1984 Tamil Nadu Legislative Assembly election from the Dr. Radhakrishnan Nagar Assembly constituency to become a Member of the Legislative Assembly (MLA).

== Electoral performance ==
=== 1984 ===
1984 Tamil Nadu Legislative Assembly election: Dr. Radhakrishnan Nagar
Party	Candidate	Votes	%	±%
INC	S. Venugopal	54,334	50.71%	+2.09
DMK	S. P. Sarguna Pandian	50,483	47.12%	New
Margin of victory		3,851	3.59%	−4.34%
Turnout		107,147	67.01%	4.65%
Registered electors		162,902		
INC hold		Swing	2.09%	

== Death ==
Venugopal died on 7 April 2024.
