= Radhakrishnan Nagar Assembly constituency =

State Legislative Assembly Constituency in Tamil Nadu

Coordinates: 12.99°N 80.26°E

Radhakrishnan Nagar
- Constituency No. 11 for the Tamil Nadu Legislative Assembly

Constituency details
- Country: India
- Region: South India
- State: Tamil Nadu
- District: Chennai
- Lok Sabha constituency: Chennai North
- Established: 1977
- Total electors: 199,359

Member of Legislative Assembly
- 17th Tamil Nadu Legislative Assembly
- Incumbent N. Marie Wilson
- Party: TVK
- Elected year: 2026

Radhakrishnan Nagar (Dr. Radhakrishnan Nagar) or R. K. Nagar, is a legislative assembly constituency in the Indian state of Tamil Nadu. Its State Assembly Constituency number is 11. It is part of Chennai North Lok Sabha constituency. It is one of the 234 State Legislative Assembly Constituencies in Tamil Nadu, in India.

== By election 2017 ==
Following the death of J. Jayalalithaa on 5 December 2016, a by-election to the Radhakrishnan Nagar (R.K. Nagar) constituency was scheduled for April 2017. On 10 April 2017, the Election Commission of India cancelled the poll citing evidence of large-scale bribery. The Commission also referred to the alleged involvement of then Tamil Nadu Health Minister C. Vijaya Baskar. The by-election was subsequently held on 21 December 2017, in which T. T. V. Dhinakaran, contesting as an independent candidate, was elected.

== Members of the Legislative Assembly ==
Year	Member	Party
1977	Isari Velan	All India Anna Dravida Munnetra Kazhagam
1980	V. Rajasekaran	Indian National Congress
1984	S. Venugopal	Indian National Congress
1989	S. P. Sarguna Pandian	Dravida Munnetra Kazhagam
1991	E. Madhusudhanan	All India Anna Dravida Munnetra Kazhagam
1996	S. P. Sarguna Pandian	Dravida Munnetra Kazhagam
2001	P. K. Sekar Babu	All India Anna Dravida Munnetra Kazhagam
2006	P. K. Sekar Babu	All India Anna Dravida Munnetra Kazhagam
2011	P. Vetrivel	All India Anna Dravida Munnetra Kazhagam
2015 (Note: By-Election)	J. Jayalalithaa	All India Anna Dravida Munnetra Kazhagam
2016	J. Jayalalithaa	All India Anna Dravida Munnetra Kazhagam
2017	T. T. V. Dhinakaran	Amma Makkal Munnetra Kazhagam
2021	J. John Ebenezer	Dravida Munnetra Kazhagam
2026	N. Marie Wilson	Tamilaga Vettri Kazhagam

== Election results ==
Vote share of winning candidates
2026	53.97%
2021	51.67%
2017 by-election	50.32%
2016	55.87%
2015 by-election	88.43%
2011	59.04%
2006	50.36%
2001	58.43%
1996	62.12%
1991	60.30%
1989	45.31%
1984	50.71%
1980	48.62%
1977	35.57%

=== 2026 ===
2026 Tamil Nadu Legislative Assembly election: R. K. Nagar
Party	Candidate	Votes	%	±%
TVK	N. Marie Wilson	97,800	53.97	New
DMK	J. John Ebenezer	48,132	26.56	▼24.64
AIADMK	R.S. Raajesh	26,892	14.84	▼13.65
NTK	Vennila. T	5,364	2.96	▼9.97
NOTA	NOTA	461	0.31	
Margin of victory		49,668	27.51	▲4.59
Turnout		1,80,530		
Rejected ballots				
Registered electors		1,99,359		
TVK gain from DMK		Swing	49668	

=== 2021 ===
2021 Tamil Nadu Legislative Assembly election: Dr. Radhakrishnan Nagar
Party	Candidate	Votes	%	±%
DMK	J. John Ebenezer	95,763	51.20	+37.26
AIADMK	R. S. Raajesh	53,284	28.49	+1.18
NTK	K. Gowrishankar	20,437	10.93	+8.78
MNM	Fazil. A	11,198	5.99	+5.99
AMMK	Dr. P. Kalidas	1,852	0.99	−49.33
Margin of victory		42,479	22.92	0.20
Turnout		185,323	70.47	2.11
Rejected ballots		291	0.16	
Registered electors		262,980		
DMK gain from AMMK		Swing	-4.19	

=== 2017 by-election ===
2017 Tamil Nadu Legislative Assembly By-election: Dr. Radhakrishnan Nagar
Party	Candidate	Votes	%	±%
AMMK	T. T. V. Dhinakaran	89,013	50.32	N/A
AIADMK	E. Madhusudhnan	48,306	27.31	−28.56
DMK	N. Marudhu Ganesh	24,651	13.94	−19.2
NTK	Kalaikottuthayam	3,802	2.15	N/A
None of the Above	NOTA	2,373	1.34	−0.31
Margin of victory		40,707	23.01	+0.28
Turnout		1,76,890	77.68	+9.32
AMMK gain from AIADMK		Swing		

=== 2016 ===
2016 Tamil Nadu Legislative Assembly election: Dr. Radhakrishnan Nagar
Party	Candidate	Votes	%	±%
AIADMK	J. Jayalalithaa	97,218	55.87	−32.56
DMK	Shimla Muthuchozhan	57,673	33.14	+33.14
VCK	V. Vasanthi Devi	4,195	2.41	+2.41
PMK	F. Agnes	3,011	1.73	+1.73
BJP	M. N. Raja	2,928	1.68	+1.68
NOTA	None of the Above	2,873	1.65	+0.35
Margin of victory		39,545	22.73	−60.36
Turnout		1,74,015	68.36	−6.22
AIADMK hold		Swing	-32.57	

=== 2015 by-election ===
2015 By-election: Dr. Radhakrishnan Nagar
Party	Candidate	Votes	%	±%
AIADMK	J. Jayalalithaa	160,432	88.43	+29.41
CPI	C. Mahendran	9,710	5.35	+5.35
Independent	K. R. Ramaswamy	4,590	2.53	+2.53
PPI(S)	R. Rajamohan Abraham	746	0.41	+0.41
Independent	P. Ponraj	537	0.29	+0.29
NOTA	None of the Above	2,376	1.30	+1.30
Margin of victory		1,50,722	83.08	+61.06
Turnout		1,81,420	74.58	−2.10
AIADMK hold		Swing	+29.41	

=== 2011 ===
2011 Tamil Nadu Legislative Assembly election: Dr. Radhakrishnan Nagar
Party	Candidate	Votes	%	±%
AIADMK	P. Vetrivel	83,777	59.04	+8.68
DMK	P. K. Sekar Babu	52,522	37.01	New
BJP	K. R. Vinayagam	1,300	0.92	−0.19
Margin of victory		31,255	22.03	11.26
Turnout		141,904	72.70	2.62
Registered electors		195,179		
AIADMK hold		Swing	8.68	

=== 2006 ===
2006 Tamil Nadu Legislative Assembly election: Dr. Radhakrishnan Nagar
Party	Candidate	Votes	%	±%
AIADMK	P. K. Sekar Babu	84,462	50.36	−8.07
INC	R. Manohar	66,399	39.59	New
DMDK	P. Mohamed Jan	11,716	6.99	New
BJP	K. P. Prem Ananth	1,858	1.11	New
Independent	K. Rajendran	1,030	0.61	New
Margin of victory		18,063	10.77	−10.55
Turnout		167,730	70.08	23.08
Registered electors		239,326		
AIADMK hold		Swing	-8.07	

=== 2001 ===
2001 Tamil Nadu Legislative Assembly election: Dr. Radhakrishnan Nagar
Party	Candidate	Votes	%	±%
AIADMK	P. K. Sekar Babu	74,888	58.43	+31.93
DMK	S. P. Sarguna Pandian	47,556	37.10	−25.02
MDMK	N. Manogaran	3,621	2.83	−5.27
Independent	K. Manikandan	669	0.52	New
Margin of victory		27,332	21.32	−14.30
Turnout		128,175	47.01	−9.44
Registered electors		272,666		
AIADMK gain from DMK		Swing	-3.70	

=== 1996 ===
1996 Tamil Nadu Legislative Assembly election: Dr. Radhakrishnan Nagar
Party	Candidate	Votes	%	±%
DMK	S. P. Sarguna Pandian	75,125	62.12	New
AIADMK	R. M. D. Raveendran	32,044	26.50	−33.8
MDMK	G. V. Siva	9,788	8.09	New
AIIC(T)	M. Panneerselvam	1,369	1.13	New
BJP	T. A. G. Parthiban	1,149	0.95	+0.38
Margin of victory		43,081	35.63	13.07
Turnout		120,928	56.45	−0.41
Registered electors		220,586		
DMK gain from AIADMK		Swing	1.83	

=== 1991 ===
1991 Tamil Nadu Legislative Assembly election: Dr. Radhakrishnan Nagar
Party	Candidate	Votes	%	±%
AIADMK	E. Madhusudhanan	66,710	60.30	+35.26
JD	V. Rajasekaran	41,758	37.74	New
IUML	A. M. Gulam Huseien	941	0.85	New
BJP	V. R. Jaganathan	636	0.57	New
Margin of victory		24,952	22.55	2.28
Turnout		110,639	56.86	−10.73
Registered electors		199,052		
AIADMK gain from DMK		Swing	14.99	

=== 1989 ===
1989 Tamil Nadu Legislative Assembly election: Dr. Radhakrishnan Nagar
Party	Candidate	Votes	%	±%
DMK	S. P. Sarguna Pandian	54,216	45.31	−1.81
AIADMK	E. Madhusudhanan	29,960	25.04	New
Independent	V. Rajasekaran	20,731	17.32	New
INC	Venugopal	12,863	10.75	−39.96
Margin of victory		24,256	20.27	16.68
Turnout		119,660	67.59	0.58
Registered electors		179,625		
DMK gain from INC		Swing	-5.40	

=== 1984 ===
1984 Tamil Nadu Legislative Assembly election: Dr. Radhakrishnan Nagar
Party	Candidate	Votes	%	±%
INC	S. Venugopal	54,334	50.71	+2.09
DMK	S. P. Sarguna Pandian	50,483	47.12	New
Margin of victory		3,851	3.59	−4.34
Turnout		107,147	67.01	4.65
Registered electors		162,902		
INC hold		Swing	2.09	

=== 1980 ===
1980 Tamil Nadu Legislative Assembly election: Dr. Radhakrishnan Nagar
Party	Candidate	Votes	%	±%
INC	V. Rajasekaran	44,076	48.62	+36.26
AIADMK	Isari Velan	36,888	40.69	+5.12
JP	K. Arumugasamy	8,685	9.58	New
Margin of victory		7,188	7.93	6.07
Turnout		90,648	62.36	17.19
Registered electors		146,769		
INC gain from AIADMK		Swing	13.05	

=== 1977 ===
1977 Tamil Nadu Legislative Assembly election: Dr. Radhakrishnan Nagar
Party	Candidate	Votes	%	±%
AIADMK	Isari Velan	28,416	35.57	New
DMK	R. D. Seethapathy	26,928	33.71	New
JP	K. Arumugaswamy	14,449	18.09	New
INC	T. N. Anandanayaki	9,876	12.36	New
Margin of victory		1,488	1.86	
Turnout		79,881	45.17	
Registered electors		178,751		
AIADMK win (new seat)				
