= P. Vetrivel =

Indian politician (died 2020)

P. Vetriivel

Member of the Tamil Nadu Legislative Assembly
- In office 2016–2019
- Constituency: Perambur
- In office 2011–2015
- Constituency: Dr. Radhakrishnan Nagar

Personal details
- Party: Amma Makkal Munnetra Kazhagam
- Other political affiliations: Indian National Congress Tamil Maanila Congress Anna Dravida Munnetra Kazhagam

P. Vetrivel (1959 or 1960 – 15 October 2020) was a politician from Tamil Nadu, India.

== Life ==
He was elected from the Perambur constituency to the Fifteenth Tamil Nadu Legislative Assembly as a member of the All India Anna Dravida Munnetra Kazhagam political party in the 2016 Tamil Nadu legislative assembly elections.

He was one of the 18 members who were disqualified by Speaker P. Dhanapal as they withdrew support for Chief Minister Edappadi K. Palaniswami and became loyal to rebel leader T.T.V. Dhinakaran and joined his party Amma Makkal Munnetra Kazhagam.

== Electoral performance ==
2016 Tamil Nadu Legislative Assembly election: Perambur
| Party | Candidate | Votes | % | ±% |
|---|---|---|---|---|
| AIADMK | P. Vetrivel | 79,974 | 42.39 | New |
| DMK | N. R. Dhanapalan | 79,455 | 42.11 | +0.61 |
| CPI(M) | A. Soundararajan | 10,281 | 5.45 | −46.81 |
| BJP | R. Prakash | 4,582 | 2.43 | +0.73 |
| PMK | M. Venkatesh Perumal | 3,685 | 1.95 | New |
| NOTA | NOTA | 3,167 | 1.68 | New |
| Margin of victory | | 519 | 0.28 | −10.48 |
| Turnout | | 188,681 | 64.95 | −4.79 |
| Registered electors | | 290,522 | | |
| AIADMK gain from CPI(M) | | Swing | -9.87 | |

2011 Tamil Nadu Legislative Assembly election: Dr. Radhakrishnan Nagar
| Party | Candidate | Votes | % | ±% |
|---|---|---|---|---|
| AIADMK | P. Vetrivel | 83,777 | 59.04 | +8.68 |
| DMK | P. K. Sekar Babu | 52,522 | 37.01 | New |
| BJP | K. R. Vinayagam | 1,300 | 0.92 | −0.19 |
| Margin of victory | | 31,255 | 22.03 | 11.26 |
| Turnout | | 141,904 | 72.70 | 2.62 |
| Registered electors | | 195,179 | | |
| AIADMK hold | | Swing | 8.68 | |
