= Rev James Lynch =

Irish Methodist minister and missionary (1775–1858)

James Lynch
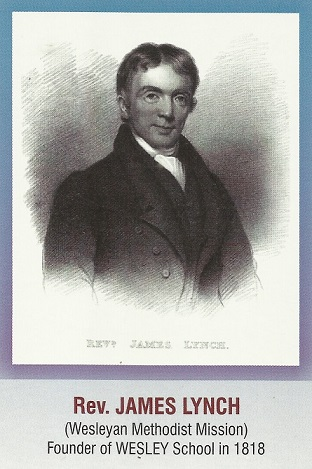
- Rev. James Lynch (1775–1858), Wesleyan Methodist missionary and founder of Wesley School in 1818

Personal details
- Born: c. 1775 Muff, County Donegal, Ireland
- Died: 21 March 1858 (aged 82–83) Leeds, England
- Occupation: Methodist minister and missionary

Rev. James Lynch (c. 1775 – 21 March 1858) was an Irish Methodist minister and missionary, notable for his pioneering work in Ceylon (now Sri Lanka) and India. He played a central role in establishing the Methodist mission in southern India and is credited with founding Wesley Higher Secondary School, Chennai, in 1818.

== Early life and ministry ==
Lynch was born around 1775 in the parish of Muff, County Donegal, Ireland, into a Roman Catholic family. At about 17 years of age, he converted to Methodism and, in 1808, entered the Wesleyan Methodist Church ministry in Ireland.

== Missionary work in Asia ==
=== Journey to Asia ===
In 1813, the Irish Methodist Conference appointed Lynch as one of the missionaries to accompany Rev. Dr. Thomas Coke on a mission to Asia. Lynch travelled aboard the Lady Melville, while other missionaries sailed on the Cabalva. Dr. Coke died during the voyage, and Lynch, as the senior missionary, assumed leadership of the mission party.

=== Work in Ceylon ===
The mission team arrived in Ceylon in June 1814. Lynch was assigned to Jaffna, where he preached in a Dutch Reformed Church within the fort and established a school as part of the mission's educational outreach.

=== Expansion to India ===
In 1817, Lynch was transferred to Madras (now Chennai), where he organised a missionary group outside George Town. In March 1819, he founded the first Methodist chapel on Indian soil, located in Royapettah.

=== Superintendent of the Tamil District ===
Lynch was appointed superintendent of the Tamil District, which included missions in northern Ceylon and southern India. He was a strong proponent of education and established mission schools as a central element of his work.

== Later life ==
In 1824 he left Madras. After returning to Ireland, Lynch continued his ministry in Lisburn, Strabane, Irvinestown, and Newry. In 1842, he retired from active ministry due to ill health and became a supernumerary minister. He moved to Leeds, England, in 1845, where he died on 21 March 1858. He was buried in Beckett Street Cemetery.

== Legacy ==
Lynch is remembered for his leadership in establishing Methodist missions in southern India and Ceylon, and for promoting education as a tool for social development. He is credited with founding Wesley Higher Secondary School in Royapettah, Madras (Now Chennai) in 1818.
