= Thazhthapattor Munnetra Kazhagam =

Defunct Indian political party

Thazhthapattor Munnetra Kazhagam (transl. Progressive Federation of the Oppressed) was a short-lived political party formed in 1974 in Tamil Nadu, India. The party was formed by the exit of Sathyavani Muthu and V. R. Nedunchezhiyan from the Dravida Munnetra Kazhagam (DMK). The party eventually merged with the All India Anna Dravida Munnetra Kazhagam (AIADMK) led by M. G. Ramachandran (MGR) in 1977.

== History ==
After the death of C. N. Annadurai in 1969, M. Karunanidhi became the leader of the DMK and Chief Minister of Tamil Nadu. The film star and party leader M. G. Ramachandran was expelled from the DMK in 1972 following his differences with Karunanidhi and formed the Anna Dravida Munnetra Kazhagam. Within two years of his exit, Sathyavani Muthu a minister in the DMK Government led by Karunanidhi left the party. Sathyavani Muthu a Dalit leader, was the minister for Harijan Welfare minister in Karunanidhi's cabinet. She resigned her ministerial position in 1974 and left Dravida Munnetra Kazhagam. She claimed that Harijans (Dalits) were not treated well by DMK since the death of C. N. Annadurai and the new leader M. Karunanidhi was prejudiced against harijans. She said

The time has come to form a new party to fight for the rights of the Harijans. After Dr. Ambedkar, nobody has taken the cudgels in real earnest......We will form a new party, sit on the opposition benches, and fight for the rights of Schedules Castes. We will not let them be exploited and humiliated endlessly.

She formed the "Thazhthapattor Munnetra Kazhagam" (Progressive Federation of the Oppressed) claiming to represent the Dalits of Tamil Nadu. In April 1977, V. R. Nedunchezhiyan the Minister for Education in the DMK cabinet left the party with some other leaders like K. Rajaram, S. Madhavan and P. U. Shanmugam and formed the "Makkal Dravida Munnetra Kazhagam". The two parties coordinated their activities. The Thazhthapattor Munnetra Kazhagam merged with the ADMK before 1977 election and Sathyavani Muthu contested (and lost) the election from Ulundurpet constituency as an ADMK member. However, the Makkal DMK merged with Anna Dravida Munnetra Kazhagam in September 1977 after the ADMK came to power winning the 1977 election.
