= C. Mahendran (CPI) =

Indian communist politician

C. Mahendran (born 1954) is one of the leaders of the Communist Party of India (CPI) in Tamil Nadu and a noted Tamil essayist.

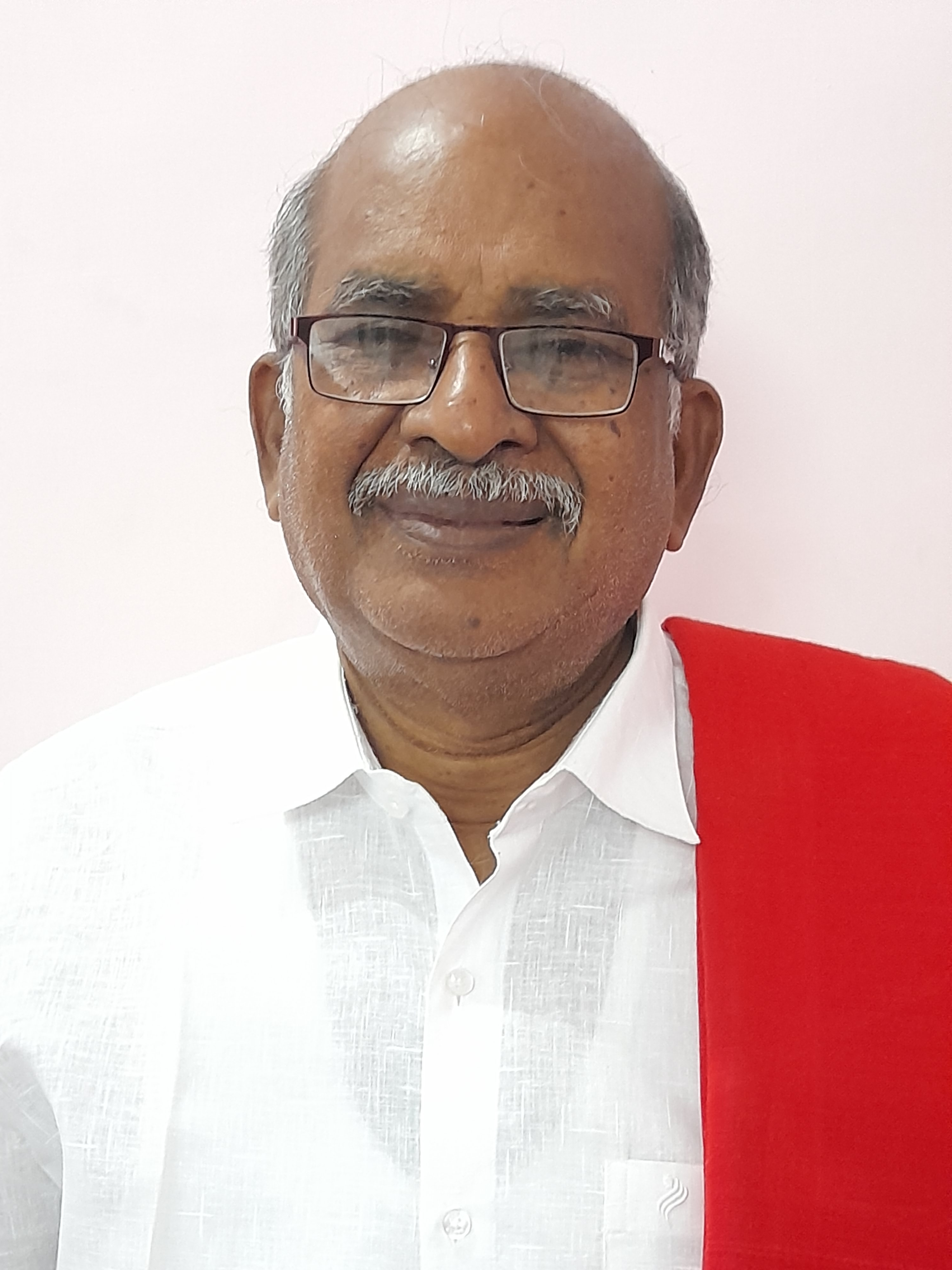
C. Mahendran

== Early life ==
Mahendran hails from the village of Kilavannipattu in the Thanjavur district. He was born to Singaram (father) and Vedambal (mother). He completed his schooling at Selvarasu High School in Thanjavur. For his higher education, he attended Mannai Rajagopalaswamy Government Arts College in Mannargudi and Thiru. Vi. Ka. Government Arts College in Thiruvarur. Drawn to communist ideologies, he actively participated in various protests and struggles during his college days.

== Literary career ==
During his school days, he participated in an essay competition organized by Ananda Vikatan and won the third prize. He was also selected by India Today magazine as one of the promising young political leaders of Tamil Nadu. He was one among 84 scholars presented research papers at the 10th World Tamil Conference held in Chicago. His book, titled Tamilarin Arivu (The Knowledge of Tamils), was honored with the Parithimar Kalaignar High Research Award by SRM University.

== Other Works ==
His other publications include:

- A Butterfly's Death Warrant (Oru Vannathupoochiyin Maranasasanam)
- The Death Warrant of Tamil Nadu's Rivers (Thamizhaga Nathigalin Maranasasanam)
- I Placed My Finger into the Fire (Theekul Viralai Vaithen)
- Did You Think I Would Fall? (Veezhven Endru Ninaithayo?)
- Do Not Turn Tamil Nadu into a Desert (Thamizhagathai Palaivanamakkadhe)
- The Birth of Tamil Nadu (Compilation) (Tamil Nadu Pirandhadhu)
- 25 Days in the Land of Farmers' Protests! Plunderer, Get Out! (Vivasaayigal Poratta Boomiyil 25 Naatkal! Kollaiyane Veliyeru)

== Editorial Work ==
For the past twenty years, Mahendran has been serving as the editor of Thamarai, a monthly Tamil literary magazine.

== Songs ==
- For the Generations to Come (Ini Varum Nam Thalaimuraikku)
- Thannane Songs (A collection of 10 songs performed with singer Chinna Ponnu)

== Politics ==
Mahendran joined the Communist Party of India (CPI) in 1971. He dedicated himself as a full-time functionary of the party in the Thanjavur district. He has held several key positions, including serving as the Tamil Nadu President and Secretary of the All India Students' Federation (AISF) and as the Secretary of the All India Youth Federation (AIYF). He also served as the State Deputy Secretary of the Communist Party of India for over twenty years.

In the 2015 Tamil Nadu Legislative Assembly by-election, Mahendran contested against J. Jayalalithaa in the Dr. Radhakrishnan Nagar (R.K. Nagar) Assembly constituency, though he did not secure a victory.

On 18 June 2026, senior CPI leader C. Mahendran joined Tamilaga Vettri Kazhagam (TVK) in Chennai in the presence of General Secretary N. Anand. Speaking on the occasion, Mahendran praised Chief Minister Vijay for demonstrating that ordinary citizens can succeed in politics beyond barriers of wealth, caste, and religion. He also stated that he would continue to uphold communist ideals while working in TVK, saying, "I will continue to wear the same red towel and remain a communist."

== Award ==
- 2025: Ilakkiya Maamani Award, Government of Tamil Nadu

In January 2026 (for the year 2025), the Government of Tamil Nadu honored C. Mahendran with the prestigious Ilakkiya Maamani Award (Literary Gem Award) under the Research Tamil category. The award, which recognizes his lifelong contribution to Tamil literature and social consciousness, was presented by Chief Minister M. K. Stalin and included a cash prize of ₹5 lakh, a one-sovereign gold medal, and a citation.
