= Perambur Assembly constituency =

State Legislative Assembly Constituency in Tamil Nadu

Coordinates: 13.10727°N 80.24448°E

Perambur
- Constituency No. 12 for the Tamil Nadu Legislative Assembly
- Interactive map outlining Perambur assembly constituency in Chennai district

Constituency details
- Country: India
- Region: South India
- State: Tamil Nadu
- District: Chennai
- Lok Sabha constituency: Chennai North
- Established: 1951
- Total electors: 222,792

Member of Legislative Assembly
- 17th Tamil Nadu Legislative Assembly
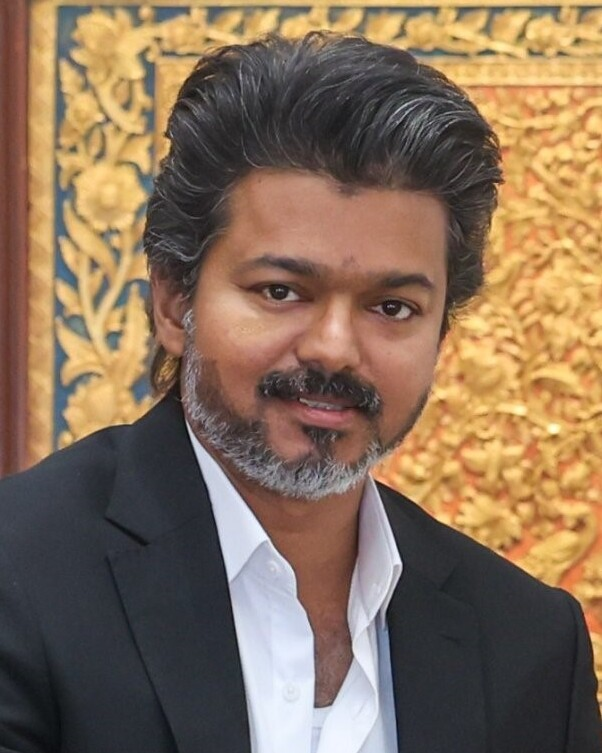
- Incumbent C. Joseph Vijay; Chief Minister of Tamil Nadu
- Party: TVK
- Elected year: 2026

Perambur is a legislative assembly, that includes the city of Perambur. Its State Assembly Constituency number is 12. Perambur Assembly constituency is a part of Chennai North Lok Sabha constituency. It is one of the 234 State Legislative Assembly Constituencies in Tamil Nadu, in India.

== Members of the Legislative Assembly ==
Year	Winner	Party
Madras State
1952	S. Pakkirisamy Pillai	Socialist Party
1957	Pakkiriswami Pillai	Independent
1962	D. Sulochana	Indian National Congress
1967	Satyavani Muthu	Dravida Munnetra Kazhagam
Tamil Nadu
1971	Satyavani Muthu	Dravida Munnetra Kazhagam
1977	S. Balan	Dravida Munnetra Kazhagam
1980	S. Balan	Dravida Munnetra Kazhagam
1984	Parithi Elamvazhuthi	Dravida Munnetra Kazhagam
1989	Chengai Sivam	Dravida Munnetra Kazhagam
1991	M. P. Sekar	All India Anna Dravida Munnetra Kazhagam
1996	Chengai Sivam	Dravida Munnetra Kazhagam
2001	K. Mahendran	Communist Party of India (Marxist)
2006	K. Mahendran	Communist Party of India (Marxist)
2011	A. Soundararajan	Communist Party of India (Marxist)
2016	P. Vetrivel	All India Anna Dravida Munnetra Kazhagam
2019^	R. D. Sekar	Dravida Munnetra Kazhagam
2021	R. D. Sekar	Dravida Munnetra Kazhagam
2026	C. Joseph Vijay	Tamilaga Vettri Kazhagam

^by-election

== Election results ==
Vote share of winning candidates
2026	58.89%
2021	52.93%
2019 by-election	56.32%
2016	42.39%
2011	52.26%
2006	44.83%
2001	52.42%
1996	67.29%
1991	54.06%
1989	53.86%
1984	53.04%
1980	54.59%
1977	42.74%
1971	56.37%
1967	54.19%
1962	54.48%
1957	24.60%
1952	42.08%

=== 2026 ===
2026 Tamil Nadu Legislative Assembly election: Perambur
Party	Candidate	Votes	%	±%
TVK	C. Joseph Vijay	120,365	58.89	New
DMK	R. D. Shekar	66,650	32.61	▼20.32
PMK	M. Thilagabama	8,561	4.19	New
NTK	Vetri Tamizhan	5,114	2.50	▼7.47
NOTA	NOTA	601	0.29	▼0.47
Margin of victory		53,715	26.28	▼1.36
Turnout		204,619	90.40	
Registered electors		226,296		
TVK gain from DMK		Swing	▲58.89	

=== 2021 ===
2021 Tamil Nadu Legislative Assembly election: Perambur
Party	Candidate	Votes	%	±%
DMK	R. D. Sekar	105,267	52.93	+10.82
AIADMK	N. R. Dhanapalan	50,291	25.29	−17.1
NTK	S. Merlin Suganthi	19,821	9.97	+8.25
MNM	A. Ponnusamy	17,072	8.58	New
AMMK	E. Lakshmi Narayanan	4,042	2.03	New
NOTA	NOTA	1,515	0.76	−0.92
Margin of victory		54,976	27.64	27.37
Turnout		198,872	62.96	−1.99
Rejected ballots		390	0.20	
Registered electors		315,884		
DMK hold		Swing	10.55	

=== 2019 by-election ===
2019 Tamil Nadu Legislative Assembly by-elections: Perambur
Party	Candidate	Votes	%	±%
DMK	R. D. Sekar	106,394	56.32	+14.21
AIADMK	R. S. Raajesh	38,371	20.31	−22.09
MNM	U. Priyadarshini	20,508	10.86	+10.86
NTK	S. Merlin Suganthi	8,611	4.56	+2.84
AMMK	P. Vetrivel	6,281	3.32	+3.32
NOTA	None of the Above	2,511	1.33	NA
Majority		68,023	35.97	
Turnout		1,89,093	64.39	
DMK gain from AIADMK		Swing		

=== 2016 ===
2016 Tamil Nadu Legislative Assembly election: Perambur
Party	Candidate	Votes	%	±%
AIADMK	P. Vetrivel	79,974	42.39	New
DMK	N. R. Dhanapalan	79,455	42.11	+0.61
CPI(M)	A. Soundararajan	10,281	5.45	−46.81
BJP	R. Prakash	4,582	2.43	+0.73
PMK	M. Venkatesh Perumal	3,685	1.95	New
NTK	S. Vetri Thamizhan	3,236	1.72	New
NOTA	NOTA	3,167	1.68	New
Margin of victory		519	0.28	−10.48
Turnout		188,681	64.95	−4.79
Registered electors		290,522		
AIADMK gain from CPI(M)		Swing	-9.87	

=== 2011 ===
2011 Tamil Nadu Legislative Assembly election: Perambur
Party	Candidate	Votes	%	±%
CPI(M)	A. Soundararajan	84,668	52.26	+7.42
DMK	N. R. Dhanapalan	67,245	41.50	New
BJP	R. Ravindrakumar	2,758	1.70	New
JMM	K. Vijayakumar	961	0.59	New
BSP	S. Palani	912	0.56	−0.23
Independent	C. Gopi Anand	861	0.53	New
Margin of victory		17,423	10.75	9.22
Turnout		162,026	69.74	1.86
Registered electors		232,344		
CPI(M) hold		Swing	7.42	

=== 2006 ===
2006 Tamil Nadu Legislative Assembly election: Perambur
Party	Candidate	Votes	%	±%
CPI(M)	K. Mahendran	81,765	44.83	−7.59
MDMK	P. Manimaran	78,977	43.30	+40.25
DMDK	J. Lingam	15,881	8.71	New
BSP	V. Perumal	1,449	0.79	New
JP	P. Viswanathan Kakkan	952	0.52	New
Margin of victory		2,788	1.53	−11.44
Turnout		182,379	67.87	19.91
Registered electors		268,704		
CPI(M) hold		Swing	-7.59	

=== 2001 ===
2001 Tamil Nadu Legislative Assembly election: Perambur
Party	Candidate	Votes	%	±%
CPI(M)	K. Mahendran	69,613	52.42	+45.74
DMK	Chengai Sivam	52,390	39.45	−27.84
MDMK	R. Natarajan	4,055	3.05	New
Independent	S. Ravi	2,702	2.03	New
Independent	R. Gunasekaran	1,700	1.28	New
Independent	K. Rama Rao	1,012	0.76	New
Margin of victory		17,223	12.97	−30.33
Turnout		132,799	47.96	−13.04
Registered electors		276,886		
CPI(M) gain from DMK		Swing	-14.87	

=== 1996 ===
1996 Tamil Nadu Legislative Assembly election: Perambur
Party	Candidate	Votes	%	±%
DMK	Chengai Sivam	90,683	67.29	+26.54
AIADMK	V. Neelakandan	32,332	23.99	−30.07
CPI(M)	R. Sarala	9,008	6.68	New
BJP	G. Nageswara Rao	1,910	1.42	−0.27
Margin of victory		58,351	43.30	29.99
Turnout		134,760	61.00	5.47
Registered electors		227,398		
DMK gain from AIADMK		Swing	13.23	

=== 1991 ===
1991 Tamil Nadu Legislative Assembly election: Perambur
Party	Candidate	Votes	%	±%
AIADMK	Dr. M. P. Sekar	62,759	54.06	+47.58
DMK	Chengai Sivam	47,307	40.75	−13.11
BJP	V. K. Sampath	1,960	1.69	New
JP	T. S. P. E Bakthan	1,588	1.37	New
TMUL	D. Kanagasabapathy	1,383	1.19	New
Margin of victory		15,452	13.31	−19.48
Turnout		116,088	55.53	−11.73
Registered electors		214,067		
AIADMK gain from DMK		Swing	0.20	

=== 1989 ===
1989 Tamil Nadu Legislative Assembly election: Perambur
Party	Candidate	Votes	%	±%
DMK	Chengai Sivam	65,681	53.86	+0.83
INC	P. Viswanathan	25,691	21.07	New
Independent	V. Mahenathan	15,747	12.91	New
AIADMK	M. Panchalaim	7,908	6.49	−39.39
Independent	S. Thirumalai	4,238	3.48	New
Independent	R. Ganesekaran	1,037	0.85	New
Margin of victory		39,990	32.80	25.63
Turnout		121,939	67.26	4.51
Registered electors		184,148		
DMK hold		Swing	0.83	

=== 1984 ===
1984 Tamil Nadu Legislative Assembly election: Perambur
Party	Candidate	Votes	%	±%
DMK	Parithi Ilamvazhuthi	53,325	53.04	−1.55
AIADMK	Sathyavani Muthu	46,121	45.87	New
Independent	Sankaralingam	521	0.52	New
Margin of victory		7,204	7.17	−2.01
Turnout		100,541	62.75	1.09
Registered electors		165,376		
DMK hold		Swing	-1.55	

=== 1980 ===
1980 Tamil Nadu Legislative Assembly election: Perambur
Party	Candidate	Votes	%	±%
DMK	S. Balan	49,269	54.59	+11.84
CPI(M)	V. Murugaian	40,989	45.41	New
Margin of victory		8,280	9.17	−7.69
Turnout		90,258	61.65	17.96
Registered electors		148,248		
DMK hold		Swing	11.84	

=== 1977 ===
1977 Tamil Nadu Legislative Assembly election: Perambur
Party	Candidate	Votes	%	±%
DMK	S. Balan	34,134	42.74	−13.62
AIADMK	T. Raja	20,666	25.88	New
JP	T. P. Elumalai	16,675	20.88	New
INC	V. M. Perumal	8,385	10.50	−32.06
Margin of victory		13,468	16.86	3.05
Turnout		79,860	43.70	−22.09
Registered electors		184,688		
DMK hold		Swing	-13.62	

=== 1971 ===
1971 Tamil Nadu Legislative Assembly election: Perambur
Party	Candidate	Votes	%	±%
DMK	Sathyavani Muthu	49,070	56.37	+2.18
INC	D. Sulochana	37,047	42.56	−2.66
Independent	A. Shammugam	939	1.08	New
Margin of victory		12,023	13.81	4.83
Turnout		87,056	65.78	−8.90
Registered electors		135,439		
DMK hold		Swing	2.18	

=== 1967 ===
1967 Madras Legislative Assembly election: Perambur
Party	Candidate	Votes	%	±%
DMK	Sathyavani Muthu	40,364	54.19	+10.68
INC	D. Sulochana	33,677	45.21	−9.26
Independent	Muthuvelu	445	0.60	New
Margin of victory		6,687	8.98	−1.99
Turnout		74,486	74.69	−1.40
Registered electors		101,856		
DMK gain from INC		Swing	-0.29	

=== 1962 ===
1962 Madras Legislative Assembly election: Perambur
Party	Candidate	Votes	%	±%
INC	D. Sulochana	40,451	54.48	+31.85
DMK	Sathyavani Muthu	32,309	43.51	New
ABJS	S. Dhanapal	1,494	2.01	New
Margin of victory		8,142	10.97	8.99
Turnout		74,254	76.09	2.81
Registered electors		100,407		
INC gain from Independent		Swing	29.87	

=== 1957 ===
1957 Madras Legislative Assembly election: Perambur
Party	Candidate	Votes	%	±%
Independent	Pakkiriswami Pillai	34,579	24.60	New
INC	T. S. Govindaswamy	31,806	22.63	−11.44
Independent	Satyavani Muthu	27,638	19.66	New
INC	T. Rajagopal (Sc)	23,682	16.85	−17.22
Independent	K. P. Samundiswaran (Sc)	14,915	10.61	New
CPI	Gailapathi	4,233	3.01	−13.89
CPI	Karuppannan (Sc)	3,698	2.63	−14.27
Margin of victory		2,773	1.97	−6.05
Turnout		140,551	73.28	18.93
Registered electors		191,799		
Independent gain from Socialist		Swing	-17.48	

=== 1952 ===
1952 Madras Legislative Assembly election: Perambur
Party	Candidate	Votes	%	±%
Socialist	S. Pakkirisamy Pillai	14,190	42.08	New
INC	M. Santhosam	11,486	34.06	New
CPI	T. M. Arumugham	5,698	16.90	New
AIFB	Malick Basha Sahib	653	1.94	New
Independent	N. Gopalakrishnan	577	1.71	New
Independent	S. Parthasarathy	394	1.17	New
Independent	H. H. L. Stone	367	1.09	New
Justice Party	P. R. Kodandarama Mudaliar	353	1.05	New
Margin of victory		2,704	8.02	
Turnout		33,718	54.35	
Registered electors		62,038		
Socialist win (new seat)				
