= Thiru. Vi. Ka. Nagar Assembly constituency =

State Legislative Assembly Constituency in Tamil Nadu

Coordinates: 13.120°N 80.232°E

Thiru. Vi. Ka. Nagar
- Constituency No. 15 for the Tamil Nadu Legislative Assembly

Constituency details
- Country: India
- Region: South India
- State: Tamil Nadu
- District: Chennai
- Lok Sabha constituency: Chennai North
- Established: 2008
- Total electors: 181,621
- Reservation: SC

Member of Legislative Assembly
- 17th Tamil Nadu Legislative Assembly
- Incumbent M. R. Pallavi
- Party: TVK
- Elected year: 2026

Thiru. Vi. Ka. Nagar (SC) is a state assembly constituency in Tamil Nadu, India, formed after the constituency delimitation in 2008. Its State Assembly Constituency number is 15. The seat is reserved for candidates from the Scheduled Castes. It is included in Chennai North Lok Sabha constituency. It is one of the 234 State Legislative Assembly Constituencies in Tamil Nadu.

Although it is named after the neighbourhood of Thiru. Vi. Ka. Nagar, that area is not included in the constituency but rather in Kolathur Assembly constituency. Thiru. Vi. Ka. Nagar Assembly constituency comprises:

- Perambur (part)
- Ayanavaram
- Otteri
- Pattalam
- Pulianthope

== Members of Legislative Assembly ==
Year	Winner	Party
2011	V. Neelakandan	All India Anna Dravida Munnetra Kazhagam
2016	P. Sivakumar	Dravida Munnetra Kazhagam
2021	P. Sivakumar	Dravida Munnetra Kazhagam
2026	M. R. Pallavi	Tamilaga Vettri Kazhagam

== Election results ==
Vote share of winning candidates
2026	48.04%
2021	61.61%
2016	45.25%
2011	58.87%

=== 2026 ===
2026 Tamil Nadu Legislative Assembly election: Thiru. Vi. Ka. Nagar
Party	Candidate	Votes	%	±%
TVK	M. R. Pallavi	69,125	48.04	New
DMK	K. S. Ravichandran	46,792	32.52	▼29.09
AIADMK	Porkodi Armstrong	23,304	16.19	▼3.95
NTK	Jagadish Chandar	2,658	1.85	▼6.38
NOTA	NOTA	527	0.37	▼0.42
Margin of victory		22,333	15.52	▼25.95
Turnout		1,43,903		
Rejected ballots				
Registered electors		1,81,621		
TVK gain from DMK		Swing	▲48.04	

=== 2021 ===
2021 Tamil Nadu Legislative Assembly election: Thiru. Vi. Ka. Nagar
Party	Candidate	Votes	%	±%
DMK	P. Sivakumar	81,727	61.61	+16.36
AIADMK	P. L. Kalyani	26,714	20.14	−22.68
NTK	Dr. R. Illavanji	10,921	8.23	+6.89
MNM	S. Obath	9,710	7.32	New
DMDK	M. P. Sekar	1,787	1.35	New
NOTA	NOTA	1,046	0.79	−1.18
Margin of victory		55,013	41.47	39.04
Turnout		132,650	60.46	−3.01
Rejected ballots		184	0.14	
Registered electors		219,399		
DMK hold		Swing	16.36	

=== 2016 ===
2016 Tamil Nadu Legislative Assembly election: Thiru. Vi. Ka. Nagar
Party	Candidate	Votes	%	±%
DMK	P. Sivakumar	61,744	45.25	New
AIADMK	V. Neelakandan	58,422	42.82	−16.06
CPI(M)	Suganthi	5,702	4.18	New
NOTA	NOTA	2,685	1.97	New
PMK	D. Vanithamani	2,056	1.51	New
NTK	Gowri	1,831	1.34	New
SDPI	Pushparaj	925	0.68	New
Margin of victory		3,322	2.43	−21.26
Turnout		136,450	63.47	−4.84
Registered electors		214,976		
DMK gain from AIADMK		Swing	-13.62	

=== 2011 ===
2011 Tamil Nadu Legislative Assembly election: Thiru. Vi. Ka. Nagar
Party	Candidate	Votes	%	±%
AIADMK	V. Neelakandan	72,887	58.87	New
INC	Dr. C. Natesan	43,546	35.17	New
BJP	E. Karunanidhi	3,561	2.88	New
IJK	Ajitha	756	0.61	New
BSP	C. Sakthivel	630	0.51	New
Margin of victory		29,341	23.70	
Turnout		123,807	68.31	
Registered electors		181,243		
AIADMK win (new seat)				
