= B. John Pandian =

Indian politician, Advocate and social worker

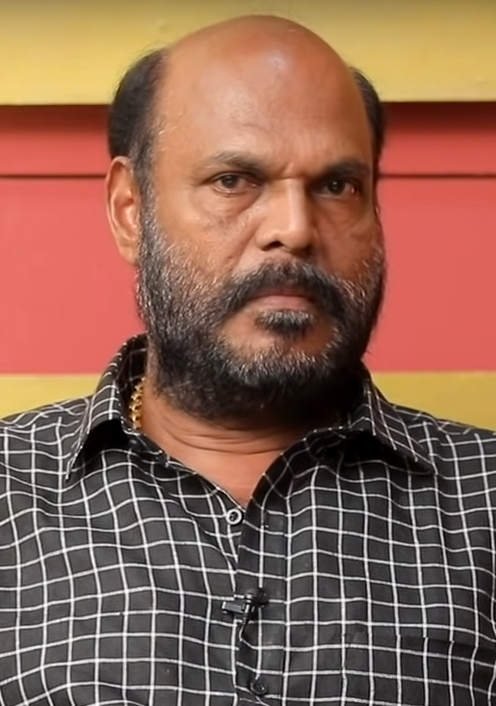
- B. John Pandian in 2020

Founder and leader of Tamizhaga Makkal Munnetra Kazhagam
- Incumbent
- Assumed office 14 April 2000

Founder & Chairman of Devendrar College of Physiotherapy
- Incumbent
- Assumed office 1998

Youth Wing President of Pattali Makkal Katchi
- In office 1989–1996

Personal details
- Born: B. John Pandian; 30 November 1955 (age 70) Sivalarkulam, Alangulam; Tirunelveli District, Madras State (now in Tenkasi district, Tamil Nadu), India
- Party: Tamizhaga Makkal Munnetra Kazhagam (2000-–present)
- Other political affiliations: PMK (1989–1995)
- Spouse: Priscilla Pandian
- Children: Dr Viyango Pandian; Dr Vinolin Nivetha Pandian
- Education: Master of Arts: Madurai Kamaraj University
- Occupation: Advocate, Politician

B. John Pandian is an advocate, social worker and an Indian politician from Tamilnadu. He founded the Tamizhaga Makkal Munnetra Kazhagam party in 2000.

== Political career ==
He was initially part of Pattali Makkal Katchi party since 1989, holding the post of Youth Wing Secretary. He contested the 1989 Indian general election in Perambalur Lok Sabha constituency as PMK candidate in 1989 and also contested the 1991 Tamil Nadu Legislative Assembly election in Mudukulathur Assembly constituency and securing the second place surpassing the DMK candidate.

He formed the Tamizhaga Makkal Munnetra Kazhagam party in 2000. The party joined AIADMK-led Alliance alliance in 2001 and got allotted one seat. John Pandian contested 2001 Tamil Nadu Legislative Assembly election in Egmore and lost the seat by a slender margin of 86 votes.

He contested the 2011 Tamil Nadu Legislative Assembly election as independent candidate in Mudukulathur and Nilakkottai as the party opted to contest unaligned.

He contested the 2016 Tamil Nadu Legislative Assembly election as independent candidate in Tiruvadanai Assembly constituency, citing differences in AIADMK-led Alliance.

Then, He joined the NDA alliance in 2017. He then advocated for the merger of six sub castes in Scheduled Caste list and a naming of them as "Devendrakula Velalar". Then he also proposed for the delisting of those sub sects into Other Backward Class. With the name change and merging successful, he contested the 2021 Tamil Nadu Legislative Assembly election as a candidate in Egmore constituency again. But post the elections, he left the AIADMK-led Alliance citing differences over seat sharing in the election.

As a part of NDA alliance, he was nominated to contest the Tenkasi Lok Sabha constituency seat in Lotus symbol.

== Elections contested ==
=== Lok Sabha ===
Year	Constituency	Party	Votes	%	Opponent	Opponent party	Opponent votes	%	Result	Margin	%
1989	Perambalur	PMK	83,933	12.54	A. Asokraj	AIADMK	357,565	53.41	Lost	-273,632	-40.87
2024	Tenkasi	BJP	208,825	20.1	Dr. Rani Srikumar	DMK	425,679	40.97	Lost	-216,854	-20.87

=== Tamilnadu State Legislative Assembly ===
Year	Constituency	Party	Votes	%	Opponent	Opponent party	Opponent votes	%	Result	Margin	%
2021	Egmore	AIADMK	30,064	25.46	I. Paranthamen	DMK	68,832	58.29	Lost	-38,768	-32.83
2016	Tiruvadanai	TMMK	9,597	5.14	Karunas	AIADMK	76,786	41.14	Lost	-67,189	-36
2011	Nilakottai	TMMK	6,882	4.8	A. Ramasamy	PT	75,124	52.45	Lost	-68,242	-47.65
2011	Mudukulathur	TMMK	21,701	12.22	M. Murugan	AIADMK	83,225	46.87	Lost	-61,524	-34.65
2001	Egmore	AIADMK	33,103	47.57	Parithi Ilamvazhuthi	DMK	33,189	47.69	Lost	-86	-0.12
1996	Valangiman	Ind.	11,984	12.67	Gomathi Srinivasan	DMK	48,019	50.78	Lost	-36,035	-38.11
1991	Mudukulathur	PMK	29,021	30.24	S. Balakrishnan	INC	40,065	41.74	Lost	-11,044	-11.5
