= S. Balan =

Indian politician

S. Balan is an Indian politician and former Member of the Legislative Assembly of Tamil Nadu. He was elected to the Tamil Nadu legislative assembly from Perambur constituency as a Dravida Munnetra Kazhagam candidate in 1977 and 1980 elections. He was elected from Egmore constituency as a Dravida Munnetra Kazhagam candidate in 1984 election.
