= V. Neelakandan =

Indian politician

Member of the Tamil Nadu Legislative Assembly
- In office 23 May 2011 – 21 May 2016
- Constituency: Thiru. Vi. Ka Nagar

Personal details
- Party: All India Anna Dravida Munnetra Kazhagam

V. Neelakandan is an Indian politician and was a member of the 14th Tamil Nadu Legislative Assembly from the Thiru. Vi. Ka Nagar constituency in Chennai District. He represented the All India Anna Dravida Munnetra Kazhagam party.

The elections of 2016 resulted in his constituency being won by his own honesty.

== Electoral performance ==
2016 Tamil Nadu Legislative Assembly election: Thiru. Vi. Ka. Nagar
Party	Candidate	Votes	%	±%
DMK	P. Sivakumar	61,744	45.25%	New
AIADMK	V. Neelakandan	58,422	42.82%	−16.06
CPI(M)	Suganthi	5,702	4.18%	New
NOTA	NOTA	2,685	1.97%	New
PMK	D. Vanithamani	2,056	1.51%	New
NTK	Gowri	1,831	1.34%	New
SDPI	Pushparaj	925	0.68%	New
Margin of victory		3,322	2.43%	−21.26%
Turnout		136,450	63.47%	−4.84%
Registered electors		214,976		
DMK gain from AIADMK		Swing	-13.62%	

2011 Tamil Nadu Legislative Assembly election: Thiru. Vi. Ka. Nagar
Party	Candidate	Votes	%	±%
AIADMK	V. Neelakandan	72,887	58.87%	New
INC	Dr. C. Natesan	43,546	35.17%	New
BJP	E. Karunanidhi	3,561	2.88%	New
IJK	Ajitha	756	0.61%	New
BSP	C. Sakthivel	630	0.51%	New
Margin of victory		29,341	23.70%	
Turnout		123,807	68.31%	
Registered electors		181,243		
AIADMK win (new seat)				
