= P. Sivakumar =

Indian politician

Member of the Tamil Nadu Legislative Assembly
- In office 19 May 2016 – 4 May 2026
- Preceded by: P. L. Kalyani
- Constituency: Thiru-Vi-Ka-Nagar

Personal details
- Party: Dravida Munnetra Kazhagam
- Spouse: S. Kamala
- Parent: Palanivelu (father)
- Education: University of Madras; Dr. Ambedkar Government Law College, Chennai

Palanivelu Sivakumar is an Indian politician who is a Member of Legislative Assembly of Tamil Nadu. He was elected from Thiru-Vi-Ka-Nagar as a Dravida Munnetra Kazhagam candidate in 2016.

== Electoral performance ==
2021 Tamil Nadu Legislative Assembly election: Thiru. Vi. Ka. Nagar
Party	Candidate	Votes	%	±%
DMK	P. Sivakumar	81,727	61.61	+16.36
AIADMK	P. L. Kalyani	26,714	20.14	−22.68
NTK	Dr. R. Illavanji	10,921	8.23	+6.89
MNM	S. Obath	9,710	7.32	New
DMDK	M. P. Sekar	1,787	1.35	New
NOTA	NOTA	1,046	0.79	−1.18
Margin of victory		55,013	41.47	39.04
Turnout		132,650	60.46	−3.01
Rejected ballots		184	0.14	
Registered electors		219,399		
DMK hold		Swing	16.36	

2016 Tamil Nadu Legislative Assembly election: Thiru. Vi. Ka. Nagar
Party	Candidate	Votes	%	±%
DMK	P. Sivakumar	61,744	45.25	New
AIADMK	V. Neelakandan	58,422	42.82	−16.06
CPI(M)	Suganthi	5,702	4.18	New
NOTA	NOTA	2,685	1.97	New
PMK	D. Vanithamani	2,056	1.51	New
NTK	Gowri	1,831	1.34	New
SDPI	Pushparaj	925	0.68	New
Margin of victory		3,322	2.43	−21.26
Turnout		136,450	63.47	−4.84
Registered electors		214,976		
DMK gain from AIADMK		Swing	-13.62	
