= S. Pakkirisamy Pillai =

Indian politician

S. Pakkirisamy Pillai was an Indian politician and former Member of the Legislative Assembly of Tamil Nadu. He was elected to the Tamil Nadu legislative assembly from Perambur constituency as a Socialist Party candidate in 1952 election, and as an Independent candidate in 1957 election.
