= Muff, County Donegal =

Village in County Donegal, Ireland

Muff Magh
- Village
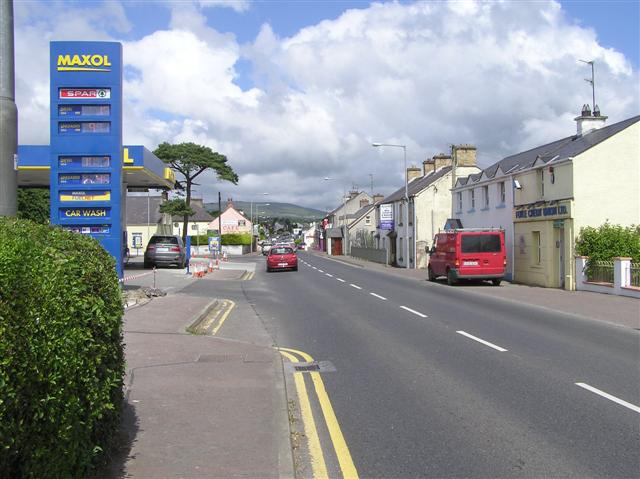
- Main Street

- Location in Ireland
- Coordinates: 55°04′03″N 7°16′09″W
- Country: Ireland
- Province: Ulster
- County: County Donegal

Government
  - Dáil constituency: Donegal
  - EU Parliament: Midlands–North-West

Population (2022)
  - Total: 1,418
- Time zone: UTC+0 (WET)
  - Summer (DST): UTC-1 (IST (WEST))

Muff (from Irish Magh) is a village, civil parish and townland in County Donegal, Ireland. It is near the mouth of the River Foyle (where it flows into Lough Foyle) and sits close to the border between the Republic of Ireland and Northern Ireland. The village of Culmore and the city of Derry are to the south in Northern Ireland.

== History ==
Muff was one of several Protestant villages in eastern Donegal that would have been transferred to Northern Ireland, had the recommendations of the Irish Boundary Commission been enacted in 1925.

Muff has experienced significant growth in population during the last decade as people from Northern Ireland migrate across the border.

== Education ==
The village has a primary school, Scoil Naomh Bríd, which has slightly over 200 students enrolled. It is a co-educational primary school under the patronage of the Roman Catholic Bishop of Derry. The staff comprises an administrative principal, eight mainstream class teachers and three special education teachers (SETs), one of whom is shared with another school. Historically, many children crossed the border to attend either Culmore Primary School or Hollybush Primary School.

== Sport and recreation ==
The local association football team is called Quigley's Point Swifts. The club was formed in 1975. In 1985, they then joined the Derry & District League (D&D). In the nineties, the club developed its reserve teams and several underage squads.

The Local Gaelic football club, Naomh Padraig, was founded on 16 February 1989. It has developed a pitch and clubhouse and competes at underage levels as well as Donegal's all-county league divisions.

Each summer, usually during the first week in August, the village celebrates Muff Festival; which includes céilidhs, competitions, street parties, parades, amusements, night-time entertainment, and live performances.

== Notable residents ==
- The playwright Brian Friel was a resident of the village for some time.
- Rev James Lynch (c. 1775 – 1858), Methodist missionary to Sri Lanka, born in Muff

== See also ==
- List of towns and villages in Ireland
