= J. John Ebenezer =

Indian politician

Member of the Tamil Nadu Legislative Assembly
- In office 2 May 2021 – 4 May 2026
- Preceded by: T. T. V. Dhinakaran
- Constituency: Dr. Radhakrishnan Nagar

Personal details
- Party: Dravida Munnetra Kazhagam
- Spouse: J. Kalpana
- Children: J. Agnes Chellama (Daughter); J. John Hydan Jacob (Son)
- Parent: John Aruputhanathan (father)
- Education: Annamalai University

J. John Ebenezer is an Indian Politician Member of Legislative Assembly of Tamil Nadu. He was elected from Dr. Radhakrishnan Nagar as a Dravida Munnetra Kazhagam candidate in 2021.

== Electoral performance ==
Election	Party	Constituency Name	Result	Votes gained	Vote share%
2021	Dravida Munnetra Kazhagam	Radhakrishnan Nagar	Won	95,763	51.2%
