= Sivalarkulam =

Neighbourhood in Tenkasi district, Tamil Nadu, India

- Village
- Location in Tamil Nadu, India
- Coordinates: 8.8697°N 77.5254°E
- Country: India
- State: Tamil Nadu
- District: Tenkasi
- Elevation: 144.75 m (474.9 ft)
- Time zone: UTC+5:30 (IST)
- PIN: 627853
- Vehicle registration: TN 76

Sivalarkulam is a village in Tenkasi, Tamil Nadu, India.

== Geography ==
Sivalarkulam is located at Tenkasi - Tirunelveli highway. The nearby famous tourist places are Kurttalam falls (20 km), Tirunelveli Nellaiyappar Temple (25 km), and Kanyakumari (125 km)

== Demographics ==
As of 2010 India census Sivalarkulam has 685 houses and population of 2461 persons (Males: 1180; Females: 1281). More than 70% of them are literates.

== Education ==
Two nursery and primary schools, a polytechnic college and a nursing colleges are educating the young minds of the village as well as nearby villages.

- St. Mariam Nursery and Primary School: This nursery and primary school started in 2014. This school affiliated to the Central Board of Secondary Education (CBSE). Medium of instruction is English language. It is located close to the state highway, southern part of the village.
- The Hindu Primary School: It is a primary (1-5th standard) school and affiliated to Tamil Nadu Govt Primary School Education Board. This school is well known for its track record of moulding good students. Medium of instruction is Tamil while English as the second language. It is located in the northern part of the village with the capacity of around 500 students.
- Aladi Aruna College of Nursing: The college affiliated to The Tamil Nadu Dr. M.G.R. Medical University and offers bachelor's degree courses of Bachelor of Science (Bsc) in Nursing.
- St. Mariam Polytechnic College: It offers diploma courses in Mechanical Engineering, Civil Engineering, Electrical and Electronics Engineering, Electronics and Communication Engineering, and Computer Engineering.

== Bank ==
Indian Overseas Bank has a branch with ATM service covering nearby 10 villages.

== Facilities ==
- Panchayat Library: Tamil, English News Papers, classical Books and technical books mostly donated by elder people and students.
- Youth Center: Volleyball Court, Kabaddi court, and basic gym facilities.
- Community Hall Used mostly for public services as well as celebrations
- Open Auditorium Annual sports meet (15–16 January) and Public Meetings when needed to consult the whole village for making decisions by Panchayat administration

All these facilities are in a single campus located in the northern bank of a canal which divides the village into two parts (North and South)..

== Religious places ==
- Amman Kovil This temple is dedicated for Lord Muppudathi Amman. A grand three days festival held every year in October welcoming the northeast monsoon.
- Pillaiyar Ganesha Kovil
- Karuppasamy kovil
