= Wesley Higher Secondary School =

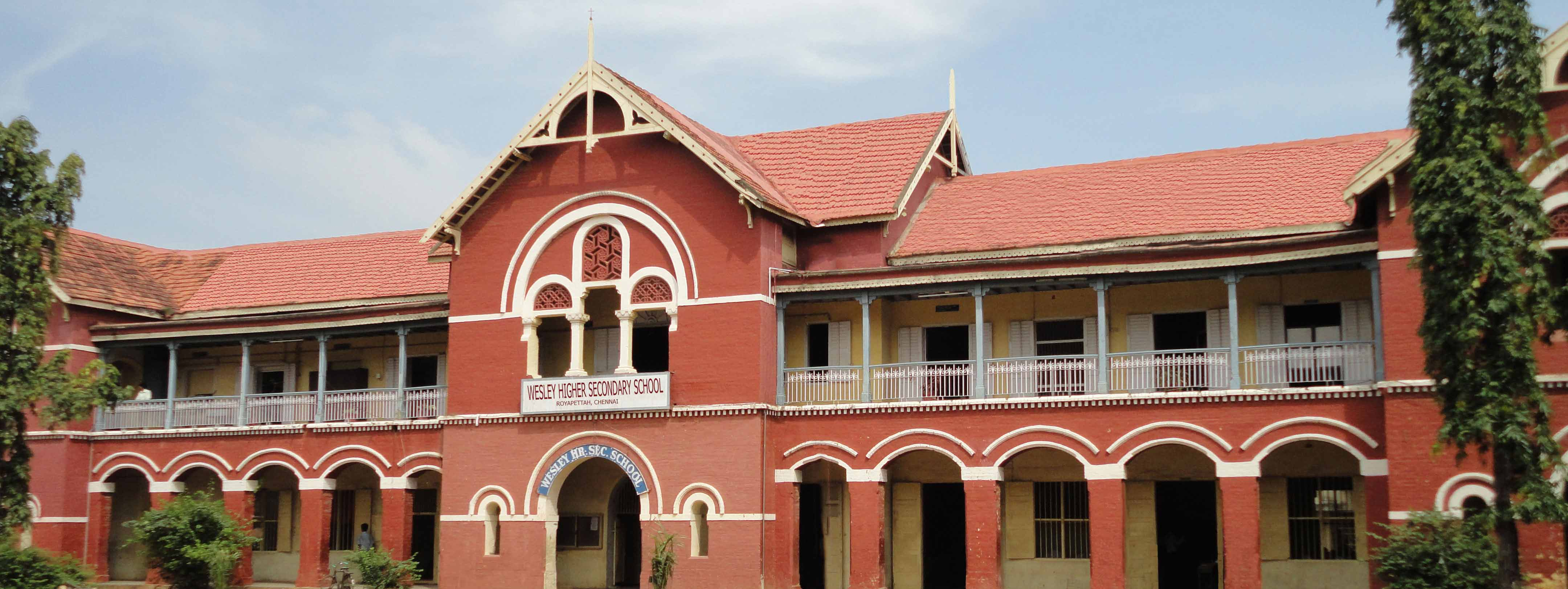

Location
- West Cott Road, Royapettah; Chennai, Tamil Nadu, 600014; India
- Coordinates: 13.057313°N 80.2642908°E

Information
- Type: Government aided private
- Motto: Latin: In Gloriam Dei Optimi Maximi (The School Strives to Conduct All Activities to the Glory of God)
- Denomination: Christian
- Established: 1818; 208 years ago
- Founder: Rev. James Lynch
- Educational authority: Government of Tamil Nadu
- Gender: Boys
- Affiliation: Institutions of Meston Education and Development Association
- Website: wesleyschool.in

Wesley Higher Secondary School is a government-aided private boys' secondary school in Tamil Nadu, India. The school is affiliated with the Institutions of Meston Education and Development Association; a Christian organisation.

== History ==
A group of followers of John Wesley set sail from Britain for India under the leadership of Thomas Coke. Coke died in 1814 on the voyage, and Rev. James Lynch (1775–1858), one of those accompanied Coke, founded the Methodist Mission in India, establishing a small school and a chapel at Royapettah, Madras (now Chennai) in 1818.

Royapettah School, a High School, was founded shortly after 1848, by Ebenezer Jenkins. He managed to establish Wesley Arts College in those days. When the Arts College was closed in 1935, Meston College of Education emerged in 1937 headed by Rev. T.R. Foulger. The Wesley High School in addition to its regular academic activities served as a practising school for this professional college.

In conformity with the structural change in school education introduced by the Government of Tamil Nadu, the institution was upgraded as a Higher Secondary School for boys in 1978, with academic courses at +2 level. The School is also involved in welfare education by arranging integrated programmes for handicapped children.

== See also ==
- Education in India
- List of schools in India
