= K. Mahendran =

Indian politician

K. Mahendran is an Indian politician and incumbent Member of the Legislative Assembly of Tamil Nadu. He was elected to the Tamil Nadu legislative assembly from Perambur constituency as a Communist Party of India (Marxist) candidate in 2001, and 2006 elections. DYFI Tamil Nadu state president in 1992–2001
