= Egmore Assembly constituency =

State Legislative Assembly Constituency in Tamil Nadu

Coordinates: 13.073°N 80.261°E

Egmore
- Constituency No. 16 for the Tamil Nadu Legislative Assembly

Constituency details
- Country: India
- Region: South India
- State: Tamil Nadu
- District: Chennai
- Lok Sabha constituency: Chennai Central
- Established: 1957
- Total electors: 1,38,775
- Reservation: SC

Member of Legislative Assembly
- 17th Tamil Nadu Legislative Assembly
- Incumbent Rajmohan Arumugam
- Party: TVK
- Alliance: TVK+
- Elected year: 2026

Egmore (SC) is one of the 234 constituencies of the legislative assembly of Tamil Nadu, India. It includes the locality of Egmore , which is in Chennai. The seat is reserved for candidates from the Scheduled Castes. Egmore Assembly constituency is a part of Chennai Central Lok Sabha constituency for national elections to the Parliament of India.

== Overview ==
As per orders of the Delimitation Commission, No. 16 Egmore Assembly constituency is composed of Ward 42,45-47,61,71-72 & 100-106 of Greater Chennai Corporation

== Members of Legislative Assembly ==
=== Madras State ===
Year	Winner	Party
1957	K. Anbazhagan	Independent*; Dravida Munnetra Kazhagam
1962	Jothi Venkatachalam	Indian National Congress
1967	A. V. P. Asaithambi	Dravida Munnetra Kazhagam

=== Tamil Nadu ===
Assembly	Winner	Party
Fifth	Arangannal	Dravida Munnetra Kazhagam
Sixth	S. Manimudi	Dravida Munnetra Kazhagam
Seventh	L. Ellayaperumal	Indian National Congress
Eighth	S. Balan	Dravida Munnetra Kazhagam
Ninth	Parithi Ellamvazhuthi	Dravida Munnetra Kazhagam
Tenth	Parithi Ellamvazhuthi	Dravida Munnetra Kazhagam
Eleventh	Parithi Ellamvazhuthi	Dravida Munnetra Kazhagam
Twelfth	Parithi Ellamvazhuthi	Dravida Munnetra Kazhagam
Thirteenth	Parithi Ellamvazhuthi	Dravida Munnetra Kazhagam
Fourteenth	K. Nalla Thambi	Desiya Murpokku Dravida Kazhagam
Fifteenth	K. S. Ravichandran	Dravida Munnetra Kazhagam
Sixteenth	I. Paranthamen	Dravida Munnetra Kazhagam
Seventeenth	Rajmohan	Tamilaga Vettri Kazhagam

- Local parties, such as the DMK, were officially registered as Independent parties, during the 1957 election.

== Election results ==
Vote share of winning candidates
2026	45.02%
2021	58.29%
2016	45.64%
2011	46.23%
2006	48.48%
2001	47.69%
1996	72.57%
1991	50.47%
1989	49.80%
1984	51.84%
1980	61.19%
1977	38.60%
1971	53.19%
1967	59.27%
1962	48.25%
1957	51.81%

=== 2026 ===
2026 Tamil Nadu Legislative Assembly election: Egmore
Party	Candidate	Votes	%	±%
TVK	Rajmohan Arumugam	53,901	45.02	New
DMK	Tamilan Prasanna	43,097	35.99	▼22.30
AIADMK	Abhishek Rangasamy	18,191	15.19	▼10.27
NTK	Saranya	2,522	2.11	▼3.20
NOTA	NOTA	695	0.58	▼0.42
Margin of victory		10,804	9.02	▼23.81
Turnout		1,19,738		
Registered electors		1,38,775		
TVK gain from DMK		Swing	▲45.02	

=== 2021 ===
2021 Tamil Nadu Legislative Assembly election: Egmore
Party	Candidate	Votes	%	±%
DMK	I. Paranthamen	68,832	58.29	+12.64
AIADMK	B. John Pandian	30,064	25.46	−11.33
MNM	U. Priyadarsini	9,990	8.46	New
NTK	P. Geetha Lakshmi	6,276	5.31	+4.11
DMDK	T. Prabhu	1,293	1.09	−4.14
NOTA	NOTA	1,176	1.00	−1.36
Margin of victory		38,768	32.83	23.98
Turnout		1,18,095	43.09	−19.91
Rejected ballots		179	0.15	
Registered electors		2,74,096		
DMK hold		Swing	12.64	

=== 2016 ===
2016 Tamil Nadu Legislative Assembly election: Egmore
Party	Candidate	Votes	%	±%
DMK	K. S. Ravichandran	55,060	45.64	−0.4
AIADMK	Parithi Ilamvazhuthi	44,381	36.79	New
BJP	M. Venkatesan	7,159	5.93	+1.55
DMDK	T. Prabhu	6,321	5.24	−40.99
NOTA	NOTA	2,840	2.35	New
PMK	A. Rajendran	1,814	1.50	New
NTK	I. Jayalakshmi	1,450	1.20	New
Margin of victory		10,679	8.85	8.67
Turnout		1,20,635	63.00	−4.98
Registered electors		1,91,494		
DMK gain from DMDK		Swing	-0.58	

=== 2011 ===
2011 Tamil Nadu Legislative Assembly election: Egmore
Party	Candidate	Votes	%	±%
DMDK	K. Nalla Thambi	51,772	46.23	+38.62
DMK	Parithi Ilamvazhuthi	51,570	46.05	−2.43
BJP	N. S. Kumaravadivel	4,911	4.38	+2.42
IJK	R. Sundara Murthi	1,132	1.01	New
BSP	D. Suresh Babu	669	0.60	New
Margin of victory		202	0.18	−7.99
Turnout		1,11,996	67.97	3.11
Registered electors		1,64,768		
DMDK gain from DMK		Swing	-2.25	

=== 2006 ===
2006 Tamil Nadu Legislative Assembly election: Egmore
Party	Candidate	Votes	%	±%
DMK	Parithi Ilamvazhuthi	38,455	48.48	+0.78
MDMK	C. E. Sathya	31,975	40.31	+37.59
DMDK	V. Ethiraj	6,031	7.60	New
BJP	Srirangan Alias Srirangan Prakash	1,559	1.97	New
Margin of victory		6,480	8.17	8.05
Turnout		79,326	64.86	20.06
Registered electors		1,22,297		
DMK hold		Swing	0.78	

=== 2001 ===
2001 Tamil Nadu Legislative Assembly election: Egmore
Party	Candidate	Votes	%	±%
DMK	Parithi Ilamvazhuthi	33,189	47.69	−24.88
AIADMK	B. John Pandian	33,103	47.57	New
MDMK	P. Manimaran	1,889	2.71	−0.8
Margin of victory		86	0.12	−52.73
Turnout		69,590	44.81	−13.61
Registered electors		1,55,310		
DMK hold		Swing	-24.88	

=== 1996 ===
1996 Tamil Nadu Legislative Assembly election: Egmore
Party	Candidate	Votes	%	±%
DMK	Parithi Ilamvazhuthi	51,061	72.57	+22.1
INC	N. Lakshmi	13,876	19.72	−28.12
MDMK	M. Kanniappan	2,472	3.51	New
BJP	P. M. Kumar	1,646	2.34	New
AIIC(T)	Janaki Kanniappan	632	0.90	New
Margin of victory		37,185	52.85	50.23
Turnout		70,359	58.42	22.47
Registered electors		1,23,034		
DMK hold		Swing	22.10	

=== 1991 ===
1991 Tamil Nadu Legislative Assembly election: Egmore
Party	Candidate	Votes	%	±%
DMK	Parithi Ilamvazhuthi	23,139	50.47	+0.67
INC	D. Yasodha	21,936	47.84	+25.5
Independent	Sivakumar	276	0.60	New
Margin of victory		1,203	2.62	−24.83
Turnout		45,849	35.95	−31.35
Registered electors		1,28,272		
DMK hold		Swing	0.67	

=== 1989 ===
1989 Tamil Nadu Legislative Assembly election: Egmore
Party	Candidate	Votes	%	±%
DMK	Parithi Ilamvazhuthi	38,032	49.80	−2.04
INC	Polur Varadhan	17,063	22.34	−25.06
AIADMK	V. Neelakandan	16,124	21.11	New
AIADMK	M. Subramani Alias Ma Su Mani	4,293	5.62	New
Independent	S. Sampath	436	0.57	New
Margin of victory		20,969	27.46	23.02
Turnout		76,369	67.30	17.16
Registered electors		1,15,205		
DMK hold		Swing	-2.04	

=== 1984 ===
1984 Tamil Nadu Legislative Assembly election: Egmore
Party	Candidate	Votes	%	±%
DMK	S. Balan	29,795	51.84	New
INC	K. R. Sri Ramulu	27,246	47.41	−13.78
Margin of victory		2,549	4.44	−19.20
Turnout		57,473	50.14	−3.61
Registered electors		1,15,430		
DMK gain from INC		Swing	-9.35	

=== 1980 ===
1980 Tamil Nadu Legislative Assembly election: Egmore
Party	Candidate	Votes	%	±%
INC	L. Ellaya Perumal	38,200	61.19	+51.96
INC(U)	D. R. Sivanesan	23,444	37.55	New
Independent	M. Ponnurangam	783	1.25	New
Margin of victory		14,756	23.64	13.06
Turnout		62,427	53.75	4.47
Registered electors		1,17,282		
INC gain from DMK		Swing	22.59	

=== 1977 ===
1977 Tamil Nadu Legislative Assembly election: Egmore
Party	Candidate	Votes	%	±%
DMK	S. Manimudi	26,746	38.60	−14.59
AIADMK	K. Deivasigamani	19,414	28.02	New
JP	Selvi D. Sulochana	16,739	24.16	New
INC	D. Yasodha	6,395	9.23	−37.59
Margin of victory		7,332	10.58	4.21
Turnout		69,294	49.28	−18.18
Registered electors		1,41,812		
DMK hold		Swing	-14.59	

=== 1971 ===
1971 Tamil Nadu Legislative Assembly election: Egmore
Party	Candidate	Votes	%	±%
DMK	Arangannal	40,596	53.19	−1.01
INC	M. Kothandapani	35,733	46.81	+3.04
Margin of victory		4,863	6.37	−4.05
Turnout		76,329	67.47	−6.96
Registered electors		1,16,206		
DMK hold		Swing	-1.01	

=== 1967 ===
1967 Madras Legislative Assembly election: Egmore
Party	Candidate	Votes	%	±%
DMK	A. V. P. Asaithambi	36,133	54.20	+8.62
INC	J. Vencatachellum	29,187	43.78	−4.47
Independent	G. Samual	1,350	2.02	New
Margin of victory		6,946	10.42	7.75
Turnout		66,670	74.42	0.61
Registered electors		91,441		
DMK gain from INC		Swing	5.95	

=== 1962 ===
1962 Madras Legislative Assembly election: Egmore
Party	Candidate	Votes	%	±%
INC	Jothi Venkatachalam	29,283	48.25	+6.04
DMK	K. Anbazhagan	27,666	45.58	New
SWA	K. Narayanaswamy Mudaliar	2,151	3.54	New
Independent	K. Aryasankaren	1,596	2.63	New
Margin of victory		1,617	2.66	−6.95
Turnout		60,696	73.81	29.64
Registered electors		84,322		
INC gain from Independent		Swing	-3.57	

=== 1957 ===
1957 Madras Legislative Assembly election: Egmore
Party	Candidate	Votes	%	±%
Independent	K. Anbazhagan	20,293	51.81	New
INC	Radhakrishnan	16,529	42.20	New
Independent	M. Sundara Rai	2,344	5.98	New
Margin of victory		3,764	9.61	
Turnout		39,166	44.17	
Registered electors		88,666		
Independent win (new seat)				
