= K. S. Ravichandran =

Indian politician

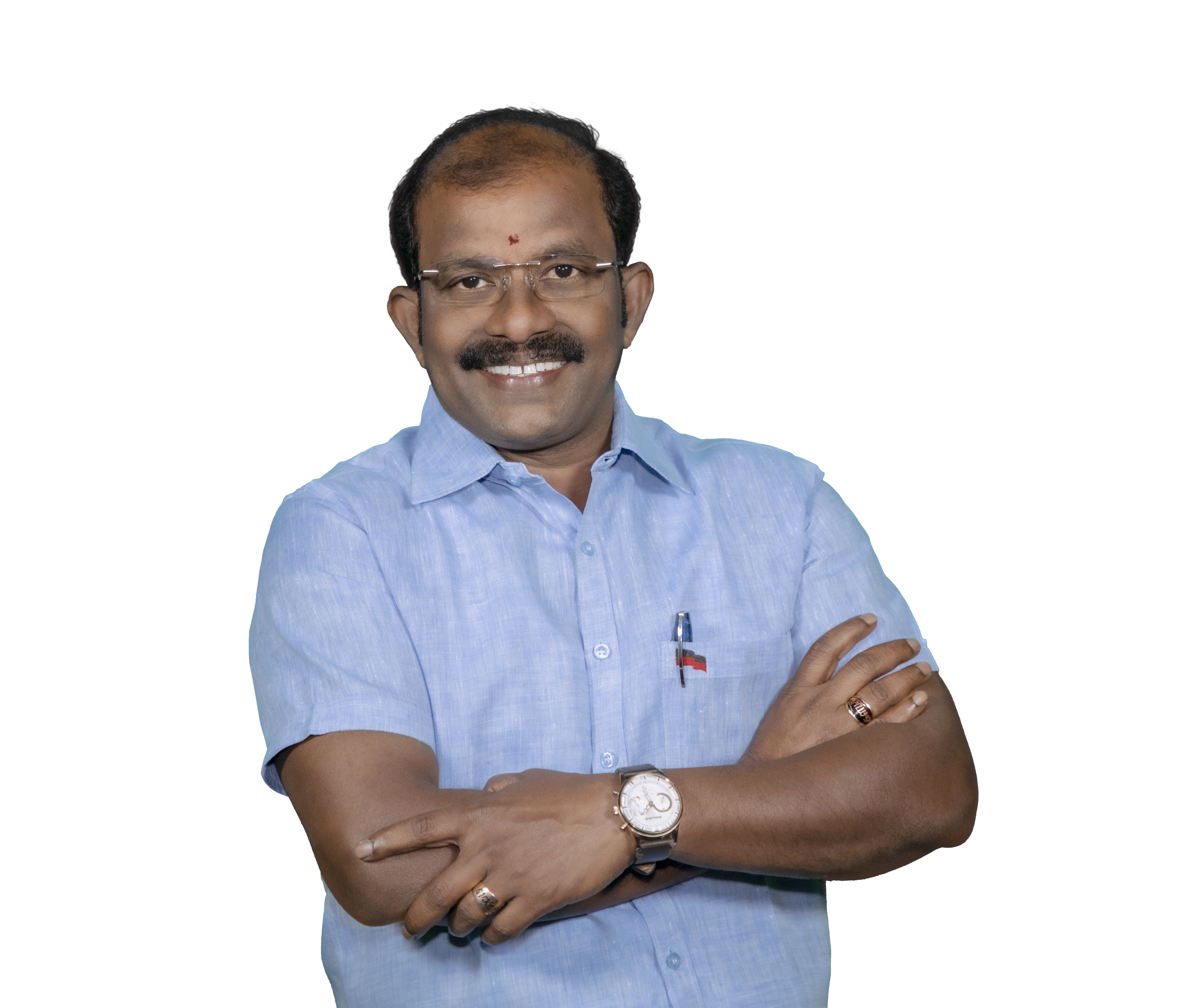

Member of the Tamil Nadu Legislative Assembly
- In office 25 May 2016 — 6 May 2021
- Preceded by: Parithi Ilamvazhuthi
- Succeeded by: I. Paranthamen
- Constituency: Egmore

Personal details
- Born: 7 - November - 1970
- Spouse: Kasthuri Ravichandran
- Children: Snehaa Shalini, Reethick Rajkumar
- Education: B.Sc., B.L
- Profession: Politician, Advocate

K. S. Ravichandran is an Indian politician and a Member of the Legislative Assembly of Tamil Nadu. He was elected to the Tamil Nadu legislative assembly from Egmore (SC) constituency as a Dravida Munnetra Kazhagam candidate in 2016.

== Electoral performance ==
Election	Party	Constituency Name	Result	Votes gained	Vote share%
2016	Dravida Munnetra Kazhagam	Egmore	Won	55,060	45.64%
2026	Dravida Munnetra Kazhagam	Thiru. Vi. Ka. Nagar	Lost	46,792	32.52%
