= T. T. V. Dhinakaran =

Indian politician

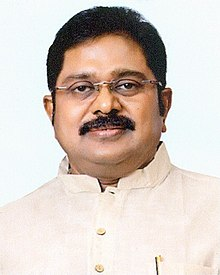

General Secretary of the Amma Makkal Munnettra Kazagam
- Incumbent
- Assumed office 19 April 2019
- Deputy: M. Rengasamy; G. Senthamizhan; C. Shanmugavelu; S. V. S. P. Manikaraja
- Preceded by: position established (Note: V. K. Sasikala as unregistered party)

Member of the Tamil Nadu Legislative Assembly
- In office 24 December 2017 – 2 May 2021
- Leader of the House: O. Panneerselvam
- Preceded by: J. Jayalalithaa
- Succeeded by: J. John Ebenezer
- Constituency: Dr. Radhakrishnan Nagar

Deputy General Secretary of the All India Anna Dravida Munnetra Kazhagam
- In office 15 February 2017 – 20 September 2017
- General Secretary: V. K. Sasikala
- Preceded by: Su. Thirunavukkarasar
- Succeeded by: K. P. Munusamy; Natham R. Viswanathan

Treasurer of the All India Anna Dravida Munnetra Kazhagam
- In office 20 July 2006 – 28 August 2007
- General Secretary: J. Jayalalithaa
- Preceded by: Dindigul C. Srinivasan
- Succeeded by: O. Panneerselvam

Member of Parliament, Rajya Sabha
- In office 30 June 2004 – 29 June 2010
- Leader of the House: Manmohan Singh
- Constituency: Tamil Nadu

Member of Parliament, Lok Sabha
- In office 13 October 1999 – 6 February 2004
- Leader of the House: Atal Bihari Vajpayee
- Preceded by: R. Muthiah
- Succeeded by: J. M. Aaroon Rashid
- Constituency: Periyakulam

Personal details
- Born: 13 December 1963 (age 62) Thiruthuraipoondi, Madras State, India (present-day Tamil Nadu, India)
- Party: Amma Makkal Munnettra Kazagam (from 15 March 2018)
- Other political affiliations: All India Anna Dravida Munnetra Kazhagam (until 2017); Independent (2017–2018)
- Spouse: Anuradha (m. 1992)
- Children: Jaya Harini (daughter)
- Parents: T. Vivekanandam (father); V. Vanithamani (mother)
- Relatives: V. K. Sasikala (aunt)
- Occupation: Businessman; politician

Thiruthuraipoondi Thiruvenkatam Vivekananda Dhinakaran (born 13 December 1963) is an Indian politician who popularly known as TTV is founding General Secretary of Amma Makkal Munnettra Kazagam. His cadres revered him as Makkal Selvar. In the past he was the Treasurer of the All India Anna Dravida Munnetra Kazhagam Party and served as the Member of Lok Sabha and Rajya Sabha. He was expelled from the AIADMK in August 2017. He also served as former Member of the 15th Tamil Nadu Assembly from Dr. Radhakrishnan Nagar (2017-2021). His aunt is V. K. Sasikala. He won the highly anticipated RK Nagar by-election in December 2017. On 15 March 2018 Dhinakaran launched his political party named Amma Makkal Munnettra Kazagam.

== Early life ==
Dhinakaran was born on 12 December 1963. He is the son of Sasikala's sister Vanithamani, T. Vivekanandam Muniyaraiyar. His younger brother, Baskaran "Bas", had a brief stint in cinema as the protagonist in Thalaivan (2014).

Dhinakaran is described as a cool-headed and religious person.

== Political career ==
Dhinakaran was a Member of Lok Sabha, representing Periyakulam from 1999 to 2004, and was runner-up in the seat at 2004 general election when he was defeated by J. M. Aaron Rashid. R.K. Nagar by-election, he defeated AIADMK's candidate E. Madhusudhanan with a huge margin of votes as an independent candidate. He assumed the office of MLA on 29 December 2017.

Dinakaran was reinducted into the AIADMK and appointed deputy general secretary on 15 February 2017, hours before V. K. Sasikala left to surrender herself in the Bengaluru court to serve the jail term in a disproportionate assets case. He was expelled from the party in August 2017 and launched his own party, Amma Makkal Munnettra Kazagam (AMMK), on 15 March 2018. Dhinakaran announced that Sasikala would be the general secretary while he would be the deputy general secretary. On 19 April 2019, he was elected as the general secretary.

He failed to win his seat to Kadambur Raju in Kovilpatti Assembly constituency in 2021 Tamil Nadu Legislative Assembly election. Dhinakaran anncounced on 11 March 2024 that his party was joining the National Democratic Alliance led by the Bharatiya Janata Party (BJP) ahead of the 2024 Indian general election, assuring it of unconditional support. It failed to win from any of the two seats, although Dhinakaran managed to become the runner-up in the elections to the Theni Lok Sabha constituency.

== Arrest and Lawsuit ==
=== Election commission bribery case ===
On 17 April 2017, Delhi police registered a case against Dhinakaran regarding an allegation of attempting to bribe the Election Commission of India (ECI) for the AIADMK's election symbol.

On April 25, 2017, the Delhi Police arrested Dhinakaran, following four consecutive days of interrogation by the Delhi Police Crime Branch. Investigators accused Dhinakaran of roping in conman Sukesh Chandrashekhar as a middleman to facilitate the deal, which was reportedly worth ₹50 crore. Police claimed that Chandrashekhar was arrested at a South Delhi hotel with ₹1.3 crore in cash, which was allegedly meant as an initial instalment of the bribe. Dhinakaran's close associate, Mallikarjuna, was also taken into custody for his suspected role in moving the funds through illegal channels. Dinakaran was charged with conspiracy and corruption in the case.

He remained in judicial custody until June 1, 2017, when a special court granted him bail on a personal bond of ₹5 lakh, noting that the specific ECI officials intended to be bribed had not yet been identified. In December 2018, a Delhi court officially framed criminal charges against him for conspiracy and destruction of evidence. In April 2022, the Enforcement Directorate (ED) summoned Dhinakaran for further questioning to confront him face-to-face with Sukesh Chandrashekhar regarding inconsistencies in their statements.

== Elections contested and positions held ==
=== Rajya Sabha elections ===
Elections	Constituency	Political party	Result
2004	Tamil Nadu	AIADMK	Won

=== Lok Sabha ===
Year	Constituency	Party	Votes	%	Opponent	Opponent Party	Opponent Votes	%	Result	Margin	%
2024	Theni	AMMK	292,668	25.65	Thanga Tamil Selvan	DMK	571,493	50.08	Lost	-278,825	-24.43
2004	Periyakulam	AIADMK	325,696	46.49	J. M. Aaron Rashid	INC	346,851	49.51	Lost	-21,155	-3.02
1999	Periyakulam	AIADMK	303,881	45.6	P. Selvendran	DMK	258,075	38.8	Won	45,806	6.8

=== Tamil Nadu Legislative Assembly Elections ===
Year	Constituency	Party	Votes	%	Opponent	Opponent Party	Opponent Votes	%	Result	Margin	%
2021	Kovilpatti	AMMK	56,153	31.23	Kadambur Raju	AIADMK	68,558	38.13	Lost	-12,405	-6.9
2017	R.K. Nagar	AMMK	89,013	50.32	E. Madhusudhanan	AIADMK	48,306	27.31	Won	40,707	23.01

=== Positions in Parliament of the Republic of India ===
Elections	Position	Elected constituency	Term in office		
Elections	Position	Elected constituency	Assumed office	Left office	Time in office
1999	Member of Parliament, Lok Sabha	Periyakulam	21 October 1999	6 February 2004	4 years, 108 days
2004	Member of Parliament, Rajya Sabha	Tamil Nadu	30 June 2004	29 June 2010	5 years, 364 days

=== Positions in Tamil Nadu Legislative Assembly ===
Elections	Position	Elected constituency	Term in office		
Elections	Position	Elected constituency	Assumed office	Left office	Time in office
2016	Member of the Legislative Assembly	Dr. Radhakrishnan Nagar	29 December 2017	3 May 2021	3 years, 125 days
