= S. P. Sarguna Pandian =

Indian politician

S. P. Sarguna Pandian (c. 1941 – 13 August 2016) was an Indian politician who was the deputy General Secretary of Dravida Munnetra Kazhagam (DMK) in Tamil Nadu. She was also Social Welfare Minister in the assembly formed after the 1996 election.

She was elected to the Tamil Nadu legislative assembly from Dr. Radhakrishnan Nagar constituency as a DMK candidate in the 1989 and 1996 elections. She died on 13 August 2016.
