= C. Ponnudurai =

Indian politician

Member-Tamil Nadu Legislative Assembly
- In office 2006–2011
- Preceded by: K. S. Palanisamy
- Succeeded by: N. D. Venkatachalam
- Constituency: Perundurai

Personal details
- Born: 20 May 1959 Pachakavundapalayam
- Party: All India Anna Dravida Munnetra Kazhagam
- Profession: Farmer

C. Ponnudurai is an Indian politician and former Member of Tamil Nadu Legislative Assembly. He belongs to Erode district and born in Kaikolapalayam village. He studied up to 11th standard at Erode. Ponnudurai is an All India Anna Diravida Munnetra Kazhagam party carder. In the 2006 Tamil Nadu Legislative Assembly Election Poonudurai contested in Perundurai Assembly constituency and won the election; thus become the Member of Tamil Nadu Legislative Assembly.

== Electoral Performance ==
=== 2006 ===
2006 Tamil Nadu Legislative Assembly election: Perundurai
Party	Candidate	Votes	%	±%
AIADMK	C. Ponnudurai	59,631	43.37%	−14.51
CPI	N. Periyasamy	51,053	37.13%	New
DMDK	M. Ravichandran	18,212	13.24%	New
BJP	T. Shri Gandheeswaran	1,960	1.43%	New
Independent	R. Palanisam	1,447	1.05%	New
JD(U)	B. Devadasan	1,136	0.83%	New
Independent	K. Krishnamoorthy	1,066	0.78%	New
BSP	M. M. S. Subramaniam	850	0.62%	New
Margin of victory		8,578	6.24%	−19.21%
Turnout		137,506	76.13%	11.18%
Registered electors		180,617		
AIADMK hold		Swing	-14.51%	
