= 2006 Tamil Nadu Legislative Assembly election =

Indian election

- 8 May 2006

All 234 seats in the Legislature of Tamil Nadu 118 seats needed for a majority
- Opinion polls
- Turnout: 70.82% (▲11.75%)
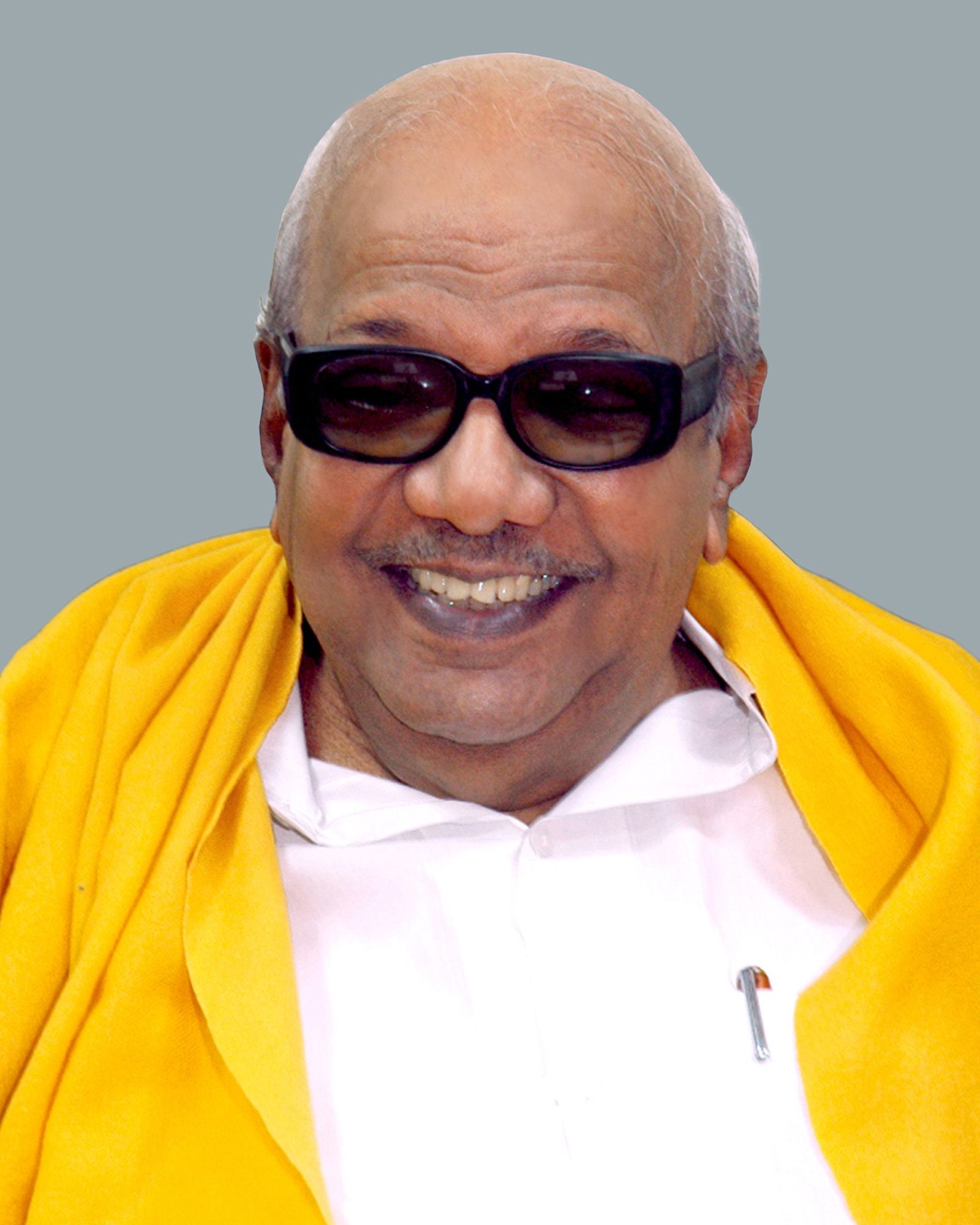

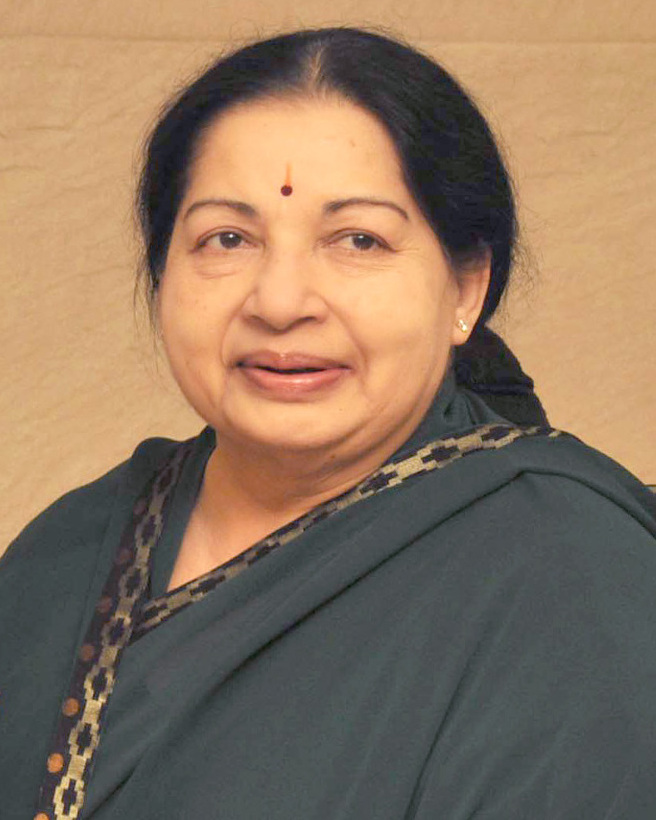
	First party	Second party
Leader	M. Karunanidhi	J. Jayalalithaa
Party	DMK	AIADMK
Alliance	DPA	AIADMK+
Leader's seat	Chepauk	Andipatti
Seats won	96	61
Seat change	▲65	▼71
Popular vote	8,728,716	10,768,559
Percentage	26.5%	32.6%
Swing	▲4.4%	▼1.2%
Alliance seats	163	69
Alliance seat change	▲71	▼64
Alliance popular vote	14,762,647	13,166,445
Alliance percentage	44.8%	39.9%
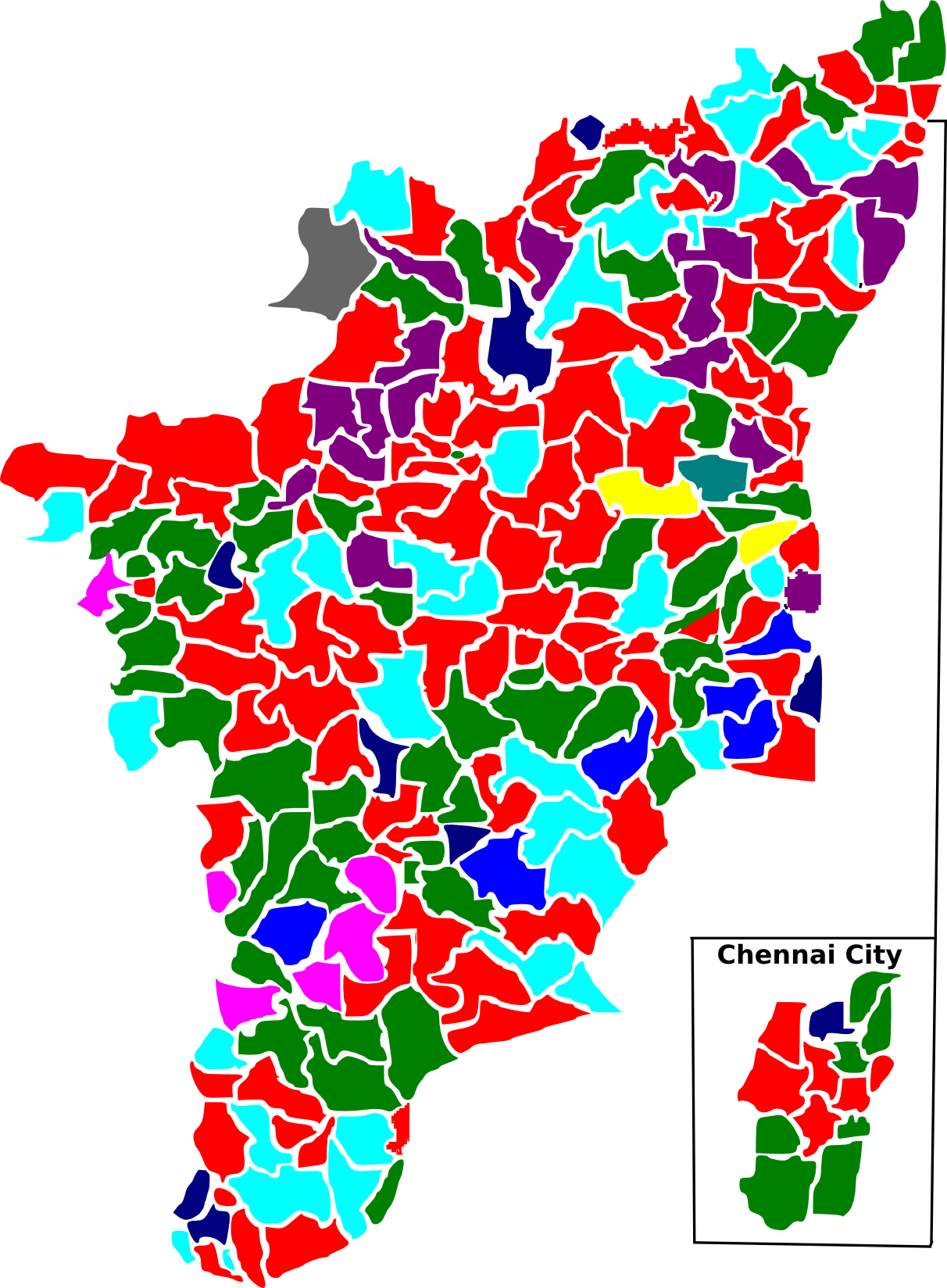
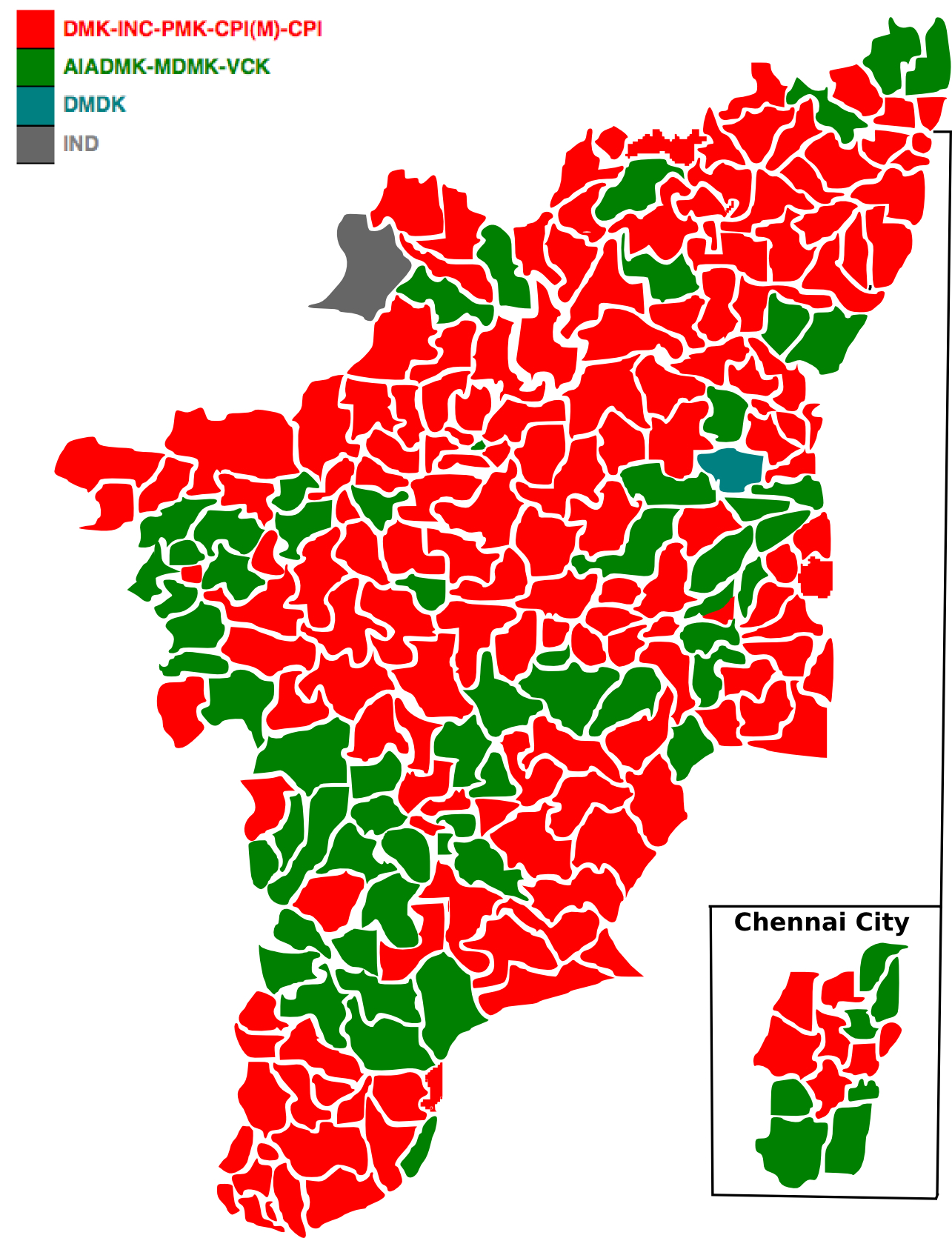

Chief Minister before election
J. Jayalalithaa
AIADMK
Elected Chief Minister
M. Karunanidhi
DMK

The thirteenth legislative assembly election, in the Indian state of Tamil Nadu was held on 8 May 2006. It was held for all 234 constituencies to elect the government in the state for the following five years. The votes were counted three days later on 11 May 2006 and all the results were out by the end of the day. The Dravida Munnetra Kazhagam-led (DMK) front won the elections, with the DMK emerging as the single-largest party with 96 seats, and its leader, M. Karunanidhi was sworn in as Chief Minister for a fifth and final term. This election marked the first time the state saw a hung assembly with no party gaining a majority of its own. As a result, DMK formed a minority government with its allies, which is the first in the state since the 1952 election. 9 ministers from the outgoing Jayalalithaa cabinet were defeated in their respective constituencies. 13th Assembly was instituted due to this election.

The election marked the electoral debut of the actor Vijayakanth and his political outfit, the Desiya Murpokku Dravida Kazhagam (DMDK). Though the party could only gain a single seat, it cut into the vote share of both DMK and AIADMK and emerged as a third alternative to the existing two Dravidian parties.

== Schedule ==
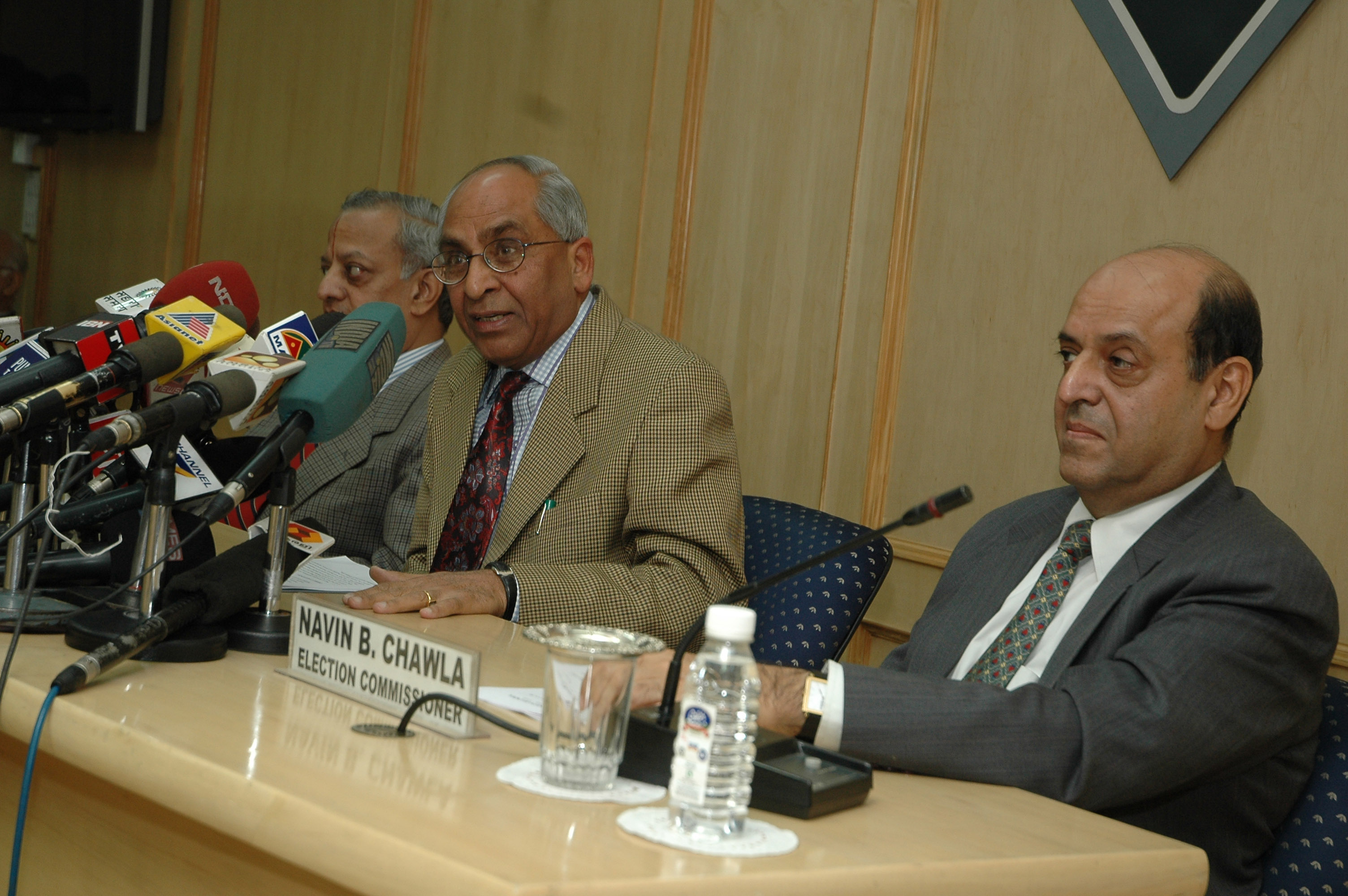
The Chief Election Commissioner of India, B.B. Tandon, holding a press conference in New Delhi on March 1, 2006, to announce the schedule for Legislative Assembly election of Tamil Nadu along with those of Assam, Kerala, West Bengal, and Puducherry.

Event	Date
Date for Nominations	13 April 2006
Last Date for filing Nominations	20 April 2006
Date for scrutiny of nominations	21 April 2006
Last date for withdrawal of candidatures	24 April 2006
Date of poll	8 May 2006
Date of counting	11 May 2006

== Polling ==
48848 polling stations were set up for electorate, that sized up to 46,607 eligible voters.

== Political parties and the alliances ==
Tamil Nadu has a remarkable history of being dominated by the local parties, DMK or AIADMK, while the national parties have a strong presence in other states. The parties have resorted to forming alliances in the last few elections to take on each sides for power.

Striking changes in the alliances included the swap of Marumalarchi Dravida Munnetra Kazhagam (MDMK) from DMK led Democratic Progressive Alliance to All India Anna Dravida Munnetra Kazhagam (AIADMK) led Democratic People Alliance. While Dalit Panthers of India joined the AIADMK alliance, all other major parties in the fray such as Pattali Makkal Katchi (PMK), Indian National Congress, CPM and Communist Party of India (CPI), aligned themselves with the DMK party.

There were two notable new parties — Desiya Murpokku Dravida Kazhagam (DMDK) formed in September 2005 by actor-turned-politician Vijaykanth, and Lok Paritran formed by Indian Institutes of Technology graduates in February 2006. Both contested alone in this elections.

The contest was between two major alliances in a seat-sharing agreement, the AIADMK alliance and the DMK alliance. These archrivals had a face-off in 106 seats.

Exit Polls predicted a 157-167 seats in favour of the DMK alliance, while the AIADMK alliance was expected to get 64-74 seats in the assembly.

Before the 2009 Lok Sabha Elections, the Pattali Makkal Katchi left the DMK, citing differences with its leader M. Karunanidhi, and joined the AIADMK, and the Third Front.

== Seat allotments ==
=== Democratic Progressive Alliance ===
Democratic Progressive Alliance

Party	Flag	Symbol	Leader	Seats contested	
Dravida Munnetra Kazhagam			M. Karunanidhi	128	132
Indian Union Muslim League			K. M. Kader Mohideen	2	132
Puratchi Bharatham Katchi			M. Jagan Moorthy	1	132
Forward Bloc (Vallarasu)			P. V. Kathiravan	1	132
Indian National Congress			M. Krishnasamy	48	
Pattali Makkal Katchi			S. Ramadoss	31	
Communist Party of India (Marxist)			N. Varadarajan	13	
Communist Party of India			Tha. Pandian	10	
Total				234	

=== Democratic People Alliance ===
AIADMK-led Alliance

Party	Flag	Symbol	Leader	Seats contested	
All India Anna Dravida Munnetra Kazhagam			J. Jayalalithaa	182	188
Indian National League			Janab	2	188
Indian National Trade Union Congress			P. L. Subbaih	2	188
Moovendar Munnetra Kazhagam			G. M. Sreedhar Vandaiyar	1	188
Forward Bloc (Santhanam)			L. Santhanam	1	188
Marumalarchi Dravida Munnetra Kazhagam			Vaiko	35	
Viduthalai Chiruthaigal Katchi			Thol. Thirumavalavan	9	
Janata Dal (Secular)			H. D. Deve Gowda	1	
Tamil Maanila Muslim League (Note: Contested as Independent)			Dawood Miakhan	1	
Total				234	

=== Desiya Murpokku Dravida Kazhagam ===
Source: Junior Vikatan

Party	Election Symbol	Leader	Seats Contested
Desiya Murpokku Dravida Kazhagam		Vijayakant	232
Desiya Murpokku Dravida Kazhagam		Vijayakant	2

The two seats that DMDK contested in Ring symbol instead of Murasu.

=== National Democratic Alliance ===
National Democratic Alliance

Party	Flag	Symbol	Leader	Seats contested	
Bharatiya Janata Party			C. P. Radhakrishnan	190	222
Ambedkar Makkam Iyakkam			V. Balasundaram	10	222
All India Moovendar Munnani Kazhagam			Dr. Sethuraman	5	222
Thamilar Bhoomi			Ku. Pa. Krishnan	5	222
Dravida Vizhipunarvu Kazhagam			B. T. Arasakumar	5	222
Makkal Desam Paraiyar Pervai				3	222
Desiya Jananayaga Congress				2	222
Makkal Tamilagam			Puratchi Kavidas	2	222
Janata Party			Subramanian Swamy	5	

== Alliance-wise contest ==
Note: As per the official party and symbol on which candidates contest in the respective seats.

Parties
Parties		AIADMK+				
Parties		AIADMK	MDMK	VCK	JD(S)	TMMK
DPA						
DPA	DMK	112	16	3	—N/a	1
DPA	INC	35	9	4	—N/a	—N/a
DPA	PMK	26	4	1	—N/a	—N/a
DPA	CPI(M)	7	5	1	—N/a	—N/a
DPA	CPI	8	1	—N/a	1	—N/a
Total		234				

== List of Candidates ==
District	Constituency		DMK+		AIADMK+		DMDK	
District	#	Name	Party	Candidate	Party	Candidate	Party	Candidate
Chennai	1	Royapuram	DMK	S. P. Sarguna Pandian	ADMK	D. Jayakumar	DMDK	Royapuram V. Babu
Chennai	2	Harbour	DMK	K. Anbazhagan	MDMK	H. Seema Basheer	DMDK	C. Chandra Prakasam
Chennai	3	Dr. R. K. Nagar	INC	R. Manohar	ADMK	P. K. Sekar Babu	DMDK	P. Mohamed Jan
Chennai	4	Park Town	DMK	A. Rahman Khan	ADMK	K. Srinivasan	DMDK	K. Balasubramanian
Chennai	5	Perambur (SC)	CPI(M)	K. Mahendran	MDMK	P. Manimaran	DMDK	J. Lingam
Chennai	6	Purasawalkam	DMK	V. S. Babu	ADMK	Venkatesh Babu	DMDK	Jacquelene Gomez
Chennai	7	Egmore (SC)	DMK	Parithi Ilamvazhuthi	MDMK	C. E. Sathya	DMDK	V. Ethiraj
Chennai	8	Anna Nagar	DMK	Arcot N. Veeraswami	MDMK	Vijaya Thayanban	DMDK	K. Senthamarai Kannan
Chennai	9	Theagaraya Nagar	DMK	J. Anbazhagan	ADMK	V. P. Kalairajan	DMDK	T. Pandian
Chennai	10	Thousand Lights	DMK	M. K. Stalin	ADMK	Adhirajaram	DMDK	M. Thalapathy
Chennai	11	Chepauk	DMK	M. Karunanidhi	IND	Dawoon Miakhan (Note: Tamil Maanila Muslim League candidate Dawood Miakhan contested as Independent)	DMDK	B. Narayanasamy
Chennai	12	Triplicane	DMK	M. Naganathan	ADMK	Bader Sayeed	DMDK	K. Shivakumar
Chennai	13	Mylapore	DMK	D. Napoleon	ADMK	S. Ve. Shekher	DMDK	V. N. Rajan
Chennai	14	Saidapet	PMK	C. R. Baskaran	ADMK	G. Senthamizhan	DMDK	R. Venugopal
Tiruvallur	15	Gummidipundi	PMK	Durai Jeyavelu	ADMK	K. S. Vijayakumar	DMDK	C. H. Sekar
Tiruvallur	16	Ponneri (SC)	DMK	V. Anbuvanan	ADMK	P. Balaraman	DMDK	S. Angamuthu
Tiruvallur	17	Thiruvottiyur	DMK	K. P. P. Samy	ADMK	V. Moorthy	DMDK	S. Murugan
Tiruvallur	18	Villivakkam	DMK	B. Ranganathan	ADMK	G. Kalan (Note: Indian National Trade Union Congress, a labour wing of Indian National Congress (Note: but contested with Dravida Munnetra Kazhagam) contested on the "Two Leaves" symbol of the All India Anna Dravida Munnetra Kazhagam (AIADMK), and is officially recorded as a AIADMK candidate in electoral records.)	DMDK	G. Velmurugan
Kanchipuram	19	Alandur	DMK	T. M. Anbarasan	ADMK	B. Valarmathi	DMDK	R. Vijayakumar
Kanchipuram	20	Tambaram	DMK	S. R. Raja	MDMK	K. Somu	DMDK	K. Dharma
Kanchipuram	21	Tirupporur (SC)	PMK	D. Moorthy	ADMK	M. Dhanapal	DMDK	K. Kannappan
Kanchipuram	22	Chengalpattu	PMK	K. Arumugam	ADMK	S. Arumugam	DMDK	S. Manjula
Kanchipuram	23	Maduranthakam	INC	K. Ghayathri Devi	ADMK	K. Appadurai	DMDK	D. Gajendran
Kanchipuram	24	Acharapakkam (SC)	DMK	Sankaravalli	ADMK	M. Saraswathi	DMDK	S. Kanthagurunathan
Kanchipuram	25	Uthiramerur	DMK	K. Sundar	ADMK	V. Somasundaram	DMDK	D. Murugesan
Kanchipuram	26	Kancheepuram	PMK	P. Kamalambal	ADMK	T. Mythili	DMDK	S. Eagambaram
Kanchipuram	27	Sriperumbudur (SC)	INC	D. Yasodha	VCK	K. Balakrishnan	DMDK	C. Palani
Tiruvallur	28	Poonamallee	INC	D. Sudarsanam	MDMK	R. Senguttuvan	DMDK	G. Chandrasekar
Tiruvallur	29	Tiruvallur	DMK	E. A. P. Sivaji	ADMK	B. V. Ramanaa	DMDK	B. Parathasarathi
Tiruvallur	30	Tiruttani	PMK	G. Eraviraj	ADMK	G. Hari	DMDK	R. Sekar
Tiruvallur	31	Pallipet	INC	E. S. S. Raman	ADMK	P. M. Narasimhan	DMDK	V. Nethaji
Vellore	32	Arkonam (SC)	DMK	M. Jagan Moorthy (Note: Puratchi Bharatham Katchi contested on the "Rising Sun" symbol of the Dravida Munnetra Kazhagam (DMK), and is officially recorded as a DMK candidate in electoral records.)	ADMK	S. Ravi	DMDK	R. Usha Rani
Vellore	33	Sholinghur	INC	D. Arul Anbarasu	ADMK	C. Gopal	DMDK	C. D. Prabakaran
Vellore	34	Ranipet	DMK	R. Gandhi	ADMK	R. Thamizharasan	DMDK	N. Paari
Vellore	35	Arcot	PMK	K. L. Elavazhagan	ADMK	V. R. Chandran	DMDK	V. B. Velu
Vellore	36	Katpadi	DMK	Durai Murugan	ADMK	B. Narayanan	DMDK	S. Radhakrishanan
Vellore	37	Gudiyatham	CPI(M)	G. Latha	ADMK	J. K. N. Palani	DMDK	L. K. Sudhish
Tiruvannamalai	38	Pernambut (SC)	DMK	A. Chinnasamy	ADMK	S. Chandra Settu	DMDK	H. Kandappan
Vellore	39	Vaniayambadi	DMK	H. Abdul Basith (Note: Indian Union Muslim League contested on the "Rising Sun" symbol of the Dravida Munnetra Kazhagam (DMK), and is officially recorded as a DMK candidate in electoral records.)	ADMK	K. Mohamed Ali (Note: Indian National League contested on the "Two Leaves" symbol of the All India Anna Dravida Munnetra Kazhagam (AIADMK), and is officially recorded as a AIADMK candidate in electoral records.)	DMDK	K. Anwar-Ul-Haquy
Vellore	40	Natrampalli	DMK	N. K. R. Sooriyakumar	ADMK	K. G. Subramani	DMDK	A. Fayas Basha
Vellore	41	Tiruppattur	PMK	T. K. Raja	MDMK	K. C. Azhagiri	DMDK	B. S. Senthilkumar
Vellore	42	Chengam (SC)	INC	Polur Varadhan	VCK	P. Sakthivel	DMDK	T. Suresh
Tiruvannamalai	43	Thandarambattu	DMK	E. V. Velu	ADMK	S. Ramachandran	DMDK	M. Mohammad
Tiruvannamalai	44	Tiruvannamalai	DMK	K. Pitchandi	ADMK	V. Pavan Kumar	DMDK	S. Kumaran
Tiruvannamalai	45	Kalasapakkam	PMK	R. Kalodoss	ADMK	S. S. Krishnamurthy	DMDK	L. Sankar
Tiruvannamalai	46	Polur	INC	P. S. Vijayakumar	ADMK	T. Vediyappan	DMDK	S. C. Purushothaman
Vellore	47	Anaicut	PMK	M. Varalakshmi	ADMK	K. Pandurangan	DMDK	M. Venkatasan
Vellore	48	Vellore	INC	C. Gnanasekharan	MDMK	N. Subramani	DMDK	A. Rajenderan
Tiruvannamalai	49	Arni	DMK	R. Sivanandam	ADMK	A. Santhanam	DMDK	D. Ramesh
Tiruvannamalai	50	Cheyyar	INC	M. K. Vishnu Prasad	ADMK	R. Pavai	DMDK	D. Subamangalam
Tiruvannamalai	51	Vandavasi (SC)	DMK	S. P. Jayaraman	ADMK	M. Chakkrapani	DMDK	N. Sivashanmugam
Tiruvannamalai	52	Peranamallur	PMK	G. Edirolimanian	ADMK	A. K. S. Anbalagan	DMDK	A. Gopinathan
Villupuram	53	Melmalayanur	PMK	P. Senthamizhselvan	ADMK	Tamilmozhi Rajathathan	DMDK	C. Chandira Dass
Villupuram	54	Gingee	DMK	V. Kannan	MDMK	R. Masilamani	DMDK	D. Rajendran
Villupuram	55	Tindivanam	PMK	M. Karunanithi	ADMK	C. V. Shanmugam	DMDK	K. Lakshmanan
Villupuram	56	Vanur (SC)	PMK	N. Soundararajan	ADMK	N. Ganapathy	DMDK	K. Raja
Villupuram	57	Kandamangalam (SC)	DMK	S. Pushparaj	ADMK	V. Subramaniyan	DMDK	P. Rajachandra Sekar
Villupuram	58	Villupuram	DMK	K. Ponmudy	ADMK	R. Pasupathy	DMDK	D. Duraisamy
Villupuram	59	Mugaiyur	PMK	V. A. T. Kaliyavarathan	VCK	M. Sinthanai Selvan	DMDK	L. Vengatesan
Villupuram	60	Thirunavalur	DMK	V. S. Veerapandian	ADMK	R. Kumaraguru	DMDK	M. S. Udhayakumar
Villupuram	61	Ulundurpet (SC)	DMK	K. Thirunavukarasu	VCK	E. Vijayaraghavan	DMDK	C. Shanmugam
Cuddalore	62	Nellikuppam	DMK	Saba Rajendran	MDMK	R. T. Sabapathi Mohan	DMDK	P. Sivakolunthu
Cuddalore	63	Cuddalore	DMK	G. Iyappan	ADMK	G. Kumar	DMDK	G. V. Jayakumar
Cuddalore	64	Panruti	PMK	T. Velmurugan	ADMK	R. Rajendiran	DMDK	S. Ramachandran
Cuddalore	65	Kurinjipadi	DMK	M. R. K. Panneerselvam	MDMK	Selvi Ramajayam	DMDK	R. Sundaramoorthy
Cuddalore	66	Bhuvanagiri	PMK	K. Devadass	ADMK	Selvi Ramajayam	DMDK	S. Shafiuddin
Cuddalore	67	Kattumannarkoil (SC)	INC	P. Vallalperuman	VCK	D. Ravikumar	DMDK	R. Umanath
Cuddalore	68	Chidambaram	CPI(M)	K. Balakrishnan	ADMK	A. Arunmozhithevan	DMDK	P. Rajamannan
Cuddalore	69	Vridhachalam	PMK	R. Govindasamy	ADMK	R. Kasinathan	DMDK	Vijayakanth
Cuddalore	70	Mangalore (SC)	DMK	C. V. Ganesan	VCK	K. Selvam	DMDK	D. Mahadevan
Villupuram	71	Rishivandiam	INC	S. Sivaraj	ADMK	L. Athinarayanan	DMDK	T. K. Govindan
Villupuram	72	Chinnasalem	DMK	T. Udhayasuriyan	ADMK	P. Mohan	DMDK	R. Subbarayalu
Villupuram	73	Sankarapuram	DMK	A. Angaiyarkanni	ADMK	P. Sanniyasi	DMDK	R. Chezhiyan
Krishnagiri	74	Hosur	INC	K. Gopinath	ADMK	V. Sampangiramaiah	DMDK	V. Chandiran
Krishnagiri	75	Thalli	CPI	P. Nagaraja Reddy	JD(S)	N. S. M. Gowda	DMDK	V. Hari
Krishnagiri	76	Kaveripattinam	PMK	T. A. Meganathan	ADMK	K. P. Munusamy	DMDK	K. R. Chinnaraj
Krishnagiri	77	Krishnagiri	DMK	T. Senguttuvan	ADMK	V. Govindaraj	DMDK	R. Govindaraj
Krishnagiri	78	Bargur	DMK	V. Vetriselvan	ADMK	M. Thambidurai	DMDK	K. V. Govindaraj
Dharmapuri	79	Harur (SC)	CPI(M)	P. Dillibabu	VCK	K. Govindasamy	DMDK	P. Arjunan
Dharmapuri	80	Morappur	DMK	V. Mullaivendhan	ADMK	K. Singaram	DMDK	S. Saravanan
Dharmapuri	81	Palacode	PMK	K. Mannan	ADMK	K. P. Anbalagan	DMDK	P. Vijayashankar
Dharmapuri	82	Dharmapuri	PMK	L. Velusamy	MDMK	V. S. Sampath	DMDK	A. Bhaskar
Dharmapuri	83	Pennagaram	DMK	P. N. Periannan	ADMK	S. R. Vetrivel	DMDK	P. Dhandapani
Salem	84	Mettur	PMK	G. K. Mani	ADMK	K. Kandasamy	DMDK	S. Dhandapany
Salem	85	Taramangalam	PMK	P. Kannan	MDMK	K. S. V.Thamarai Kannan	DMDK	C. J. Suresh
Salem	86	Omalur	PMK	A. Tamizharasu	ADMK	C. Krishnan	DMDK	S. Kamalakkannan
Salem	87	Yercaud (ST)	DMK	C. Tamilselvan	ADMK	J. Alamelu	DMDK	V. Ramakrishnan
Salem	88	Salem-I	INC	M. R. Suresh	ADMK	L. Ravichandran	DMDK	S. J. Dhanasekar
Salem	89	Salem-II	DMK	Veerapandy Arumugam	ADMK	R. Sureshkumar	DMDK	K. V. Gnanasekaran
Salem	90	Veerapandi	DMK	A. Rajendran	ADMK	P. Vijayalakshmi Pal.	DMDK	S. Salem Govindaraj
Salem	91	Panamarathupatty	DMK	R. Rajendran	ADMK	R. Elangovan	DMDK	K. Suresh Babu
Salem	92	Attur	INC	M. R. Sundaram	ADMK	A. K. Murugesan	DMDK	A. R. Elangovan
Salem	93	Talavasal (SC)	DMK	K. Chinnadurai	ADMK	P. Elangovan	DMDK	K. Geetha
Namakkal	94	Rasipuram	DMK	K. P. Ramaswamy	ADMK	P. R. Sundaram	DMDK	R. Rajagounder
Namakkal	95	Sendamangalam (ST)	DMK	K. Ponnusamy	ADMK	P. Chandran	DMDK	R. Santhi
Namakkal	96	Namakkal (SC)	INC	K. Jeyakumar	ADMK	R. Saradha	DMDK	P. Amudha
Namakkal	97	Kapilamalai	PMK	K. Nedunchezhian	MDMK	T. N. Guruswamy	DMDK	K. Selvi
Namakkal	98	Tiruchengode	DMK	S. Gandhiselvan	ADMK	P. Thangamani	DMDK	S. Pongiyannan
Salem	99	Sankari (SC)	DMK	V. P. Duraisamy	ADMK	S. Shanthamani	DMDK	R. Easwaran
Salem	100	Edapadi	PMK	V. Kaveri	ADMK	Edappadi K.Palaniswami	DMDK	A. K. Rajendran
Coimbatore	101	Mettupalayam	DMK	B. Arunkumar	ADMK	O. K. Chinnaraj	DMDK	V. Saraswathi
Coimbatore	102	Avanashi (SC)	CPI	M. Arumugham	ADMK	R. Prema	DMDK	M. Anandharaj
Coimbatore	103	Thondamuthur	INC	S. R. Balasubramaniam	MDMK	M. Kannappan	DMDK	E. Dennis Kovil Pillai
Coimbatore	104	Singanallur	CPI(M)	A. Soundararajan	ADMK	R. Chinnasamy	DMDK	M. Ponnusamy
Coimbatore	105	Coimbatore West	INC	A. S. Maheswari	ADMK	T. Malaravan	DMDK	A. S. Akbar
Coimbatore	106	Coimbatore East	DMK	Pongalur N. Palanisamy	ADMK	V. Gopalakrishnan	DMDK	G. Mary
Coimbatore	107	Perur	DMK	N. Rukumani	ADMK	S. P. Velumani	DMDK	S. Rajasekar
Coimbatore	108	Kinathukkadavu	DMK	K. V. Kandaswamy	ADMK	S. Damodaran	DMDK	C. B. Latharani
Coimbatore	109	Pollachi	DMK	D. Shanthi Devi	ADMK	V. Jayaraman	DMDK	S. Meenakshi Sundaram
Coimbatore	110	Valparai (SC)	INC	N. Kovaithangam	VCK	S. Kalaiyarasan Susi	DMDK	S. Murugaraj
Coimbatore	111	Udumalpet	DMK	C. Veluchamy	ADMK	C. Shanmugavelu	DMDK	G. R.Gnanasambandham
Coimbatore	112	Dharapuram (SC)	DMK	P. Prabavathi	ADMK	M. Ranganayahi	DMDK	K. N. K.Jyothipaandiyan
Coimbatore	113	Vellakoil	DMK	M. P. Saminathan	MDMK	A. Ganeshamurthi	DMDK	P. Jaganathan
Coimbatore	114	Pongalur	DMK	S. Mani	ADMK	P. V. Damodaran	DMDK	C. Ramesh
Coimbatore	115	Palladam	DMK	S. S. Ponmudi	ADMK	S. M. Velusamy	DMDK	G. Subramaniam
Coimbatore	116	Tiruppur	CPI(M)	C. Govindasamy	MDMK	S. Duraisamy	DMDK	K. Palanisamy
Coimbatore	117	Kangayam	INC	S. Sekar	ADMK	N. M. S. Palaniswami	DMDK	P. Kumarasamy
Erode	118	Modakurichi	INC	R. M. Palanisami	ADMK	V. P. Namachivayam	DMDK	B. Victoria
Erode	119	Perundurai	CPI	N. Periyasamy	ADMK	C. Ponnudurai	DMDK	M. Ravichandran
Erode	120	Erode	DMK	N. K. K. P. Raja	ADMK	E. R. Sivakumar	DMDK	V. C. Chandhirakumar
Erode	121	Bhavani	PMK	K. V. Ramanathan	ADMK	K. C. Karuppannan	DMDK	P. Gopal
Erode	122	Andhiyur (SC)	DMK	S. Gurusamy	ADMK	M. Subramaniam	DMDK	P. Jagadeeswaran
Erode	123	Gobichettipalayam	DMK	G. V. V. Manimaran	ADMK	K. A. Sengottaiyan	DMDK	G. S. Natarajan
Erode	124	Bhavanisagar	DMK	O. Subramaniam	ADMK	Sindu Ravichandaran	DMDK	K. Subramanian
Erode	125	Sathyamangalam	DMK	L. P. Dharmalingam	MDMK	T. K. Subramaniam	DMDK	D. Manoharan
Nilgiris	126	Coonoor (SC)	DMK	A. Soundarapandian	ADMK	M. Selvaraj	DMDK	V. Chidambaram
Nilgiris	127	Ootacamund	INC	B. Gopalan	ADMK	K. N. Dorai	DMDK	J. Benjamin Jacob
Nilgiris	128	Gudalur	DMK	K. Ramachandran	ADMK	A. Miller	DMDK	L. Krishnamurthy
Dindigul	129	Palani (SC)	DMK	M. Anbalakan	ADMK	S. Prema	DMDK	P. K. Sundaram
Dindigul	130	Oddanchatram	DMK	R. Sakkarapani	ADMK	K. P. Nallasamy	DMDK	S. Balasubramani
Theni	131	Periyakulam	DMK	L. Mookiah	ADMK	O. Panneerselvam	DMDK	M. Abdul Kather
Theni	132	Theni	INC	N. R. T. Rajkumar	ADMK	D. Ganesan	DMDK	P. Murugesan
Theni	133	Bodinayakkanur	DMK	S. Lakshmanan	ADMK	R. Parthipan	DMDK	A. Atchayakannan
Theni	134	Cumbum	DMK	P. Selvendran	MDMK	N. Eramakrishnan	DMDK	A. Jeganath
Theni	135	Andipatti	DMK	Seeman	ADMK	J. Jayalalithaa	DMDK	V. S. Chandran
Theni	136	Sedapatti	DMK	G. Thalapathi	ADMK	C. Durairaj	DMDK	A. Samundeeswari
Madurai	137	Thirumangalam	DMK	V. Velusamy	MDMK	Veera Elavarasu	DMDK	T. Dhanapandiyan
Madurai	138	Usilampatti	DMK	P. V. Kathiravan (Note: Forward Bloc (Vallarasu) faction contested on the "Rising Sun" symbol of the Dravida Munnetra Kazhagam (DMK), and is officially recorded as a DMK candidate in electoral records.)	ADMK	I. Mahendran	DMDK	A. K. T. Raja
Dindigul	139	Nilakottai (SC)	INC	K. Senthilvel	ADMK	S. Thenmozhi	DMDK	M. Ravichandran
Madurai	140	Sholavandan	DMK	P. Moorthy	ADMK	L. Santhanam (Note: Forward Bloc (Santhanam) faction contested on the "Two Leaves" symbol of the All India Anna Dravida Munnetra Kazhagam (AIADMK), and is officially recorded as a AIADMK candidate in electoral records.)	DMDK	P. Rajendran
Madurai	141	Tirupparankundram	CPI(M)	S. Venkatesan	ADMK	A. K. Bose	DMDK	G. Rajamanickam
Madurai	142	Madurai West	INC	N. Perumal	ADMK	S. V. Shanmugam	DMDK	Dr. S. Manimaran
Madurai	143	Madurai Central	DMK	P. T. R. Palanivel Rajan	ADMK	S. T. K. Jakkaiyan	DMDK	R. Sundarrajan
Madurai	144	Madurai East	CPI(M)	N. Nanmaran	MDMK	M. Boominathan	DMDK	A. Dhamodharan
Madurai	145	Samayanallur (SC)	DMK	A. Tamilarasi	ADMK	P. Lakshmi	DMDK	K. Baskaran
Madurai	146	Melur	INC	K. V. V. Ravichandran	ADMK	Melur R. Samy	DMDK	C. T. Rajaram
Dindigul	147	Natham	DMK	M. A. Andiambalam	ADMK	Natham R.Viswanathan	DMDK	V. Ganeshan
Dindigul	148	Dindigul	CPI(M)	K. Balabharathi	MDMK	N. Selvaraghavan	DMDK	G. Karthikeyan
Dindigul	149	Athoor	DMK	I. Periyasamy	ADMK	C. Sreenivasan	DMDK	P. Rajesh Perumal
Dindigul	150	Vedasandur	INC	M. Dhandapani	ADMK	S. Palanichamy	DMDK	S. Venkatachalam
Karur	151	Aravakurichi	DMK	M. A. Khaleelur Rahman	MDMK	P. Monjanur Ramasamy	DMDK	A. Basheer Mohamed
Karur	152	Karur	DMK	Vasuki Murugesan	ADMK	V. Senthil Balaji	DMDK	A. Ravi
Karur	153	Krishnarayapuram (SC)	DMK	P. Kamaraj	ADMK	R. Sasikala	DMDK	D. Murugan
Tiruchirapalli	154	Marungapuri	DMK	A. Rokkaiah	ADMK	C. Chinnasamy	DMDK	M. Jamal Mohamed
Karur	155	Kulithalai	DMK	R. Manickam	ADMK	A. Pappa Sundaram	DMDK	M. Viswanathan
Tiruchirapalli	156	Thottiam	INC	M. Rajasekharan	MDMK	R. Natarajan	DMDK	P. Manoharan
Tiruchirapalli	157	Uppiliapuram (ST)	DMK	R. Rani	ADMK	P. Muthusamy	DMDK	M. Mookan
Tiruchirapalli	158	Musiri	DMK	N. Selvaraj	ADMK	T. P. Poonachi	DMDK	M. Rajalingam
Tiruchirapalli	159	Lalgudi	DMK	A. Soundara Pandian	ADMK	T. Rajaram	DMDK	S. Ramu
Perambalur	160	Perambalur (SC)	DMK	M. Rajkumar	ADMK	M. Sundaram	DMDK	P. Manimegalai
Perambalur	161	Varahur (SC)	PMK	K. Gopalakrishnan	ADMK	M. Chandrakasi	DMDK	M. Ganapathi
Perambalur	162	Ariyalur	INC	D. Amaramoorthy	ADMK	M. Ravichandran	DMDK	Rama. Jayavel
Perambalur	163	Andimadam	DMK	S. S. Sivasankar	ADMK	K. Pannerselvam	DMDK	M. Pannerselvam
Perambalur	164	Jayankondam	PMK	Kaduvetti Guru	ADMK	K. Rajendran	DMDK	M. Johnson
Tiruchirapalli	165	Srirangam	INC	G. Jerome Arokiaraj	ADMK	M. Paranjothi	DMDK	A. Ramesh
Tiruchirapalli	166	Tiruchirapalli-I	DMK	Anbil Periyasamy	MDMK	A. Malarmannan	DMDK	P. Uma
Tiruchirapalli	167	Tiruchirapalli-II	DMK	K. N. Nehru	ADMK	M. Mariam Pichai	DMDK	A. D. Sendhureswaran
Tiruchirapalli	168	Thiruverambur	DMK	K. N. Sekaran	ADMK	Sridhar Vandayar (Note: Moovendar Munnetra Kazhagam contested on the "Two Leaves" symbol of the All India Anna Dravida Munnetra Kazhagam (AIADMK), and is officially recorded as a AIADMK candidate in electoral records.)	DMDK	K. Thangamani
Nagapattinam	169	Sirkali (SC)	DMK	M. Panneerselvam	VCK	P. Durairajan	DMDK	Pon. Balakrishnan
Nagapattinam	170	Poompuhar	PMK	K. Periyasamy	ADMK	S. Pavunraj	DMDK	V. R. Prabakaran
Nagapattinam	171	Mayuram	INC	S. Rajakumar	MDMK	M. Mahalingam	DMDK	P. Thavamani
Nagapattinam	172	Kuttalam	DMK	K. Anbazhagan	ADMK	S. Rajendran	DMDK	K. Sarangambani
Tiruvarur	173	Nannilam (SC)	CPI	P. Padmavathy	ADMK	K. Arivanandam	DMDK	R. Rajendran
Tiruvarur	174	Tiruvarur (SC)	DMK	U. Mathivanan	ADMK	A. Thangamani	DMDK	N. Mohankumar
Nagapattinam	175	Nagapattinam	CPI(M)	V. Marimuthu	ADMK	K. A. Jayapal	DMDK	Peru. Mathiyalagan
Nagapattinam	176	Vedaranyam	DMK	S. K. Vedarathinam	ADMK	O. S. Manian	DMDK	B. Veeravinayagam
Tiruvarur	177	Tiruthuraipundi (SC)	CPI	K. Ulaganathan	ADMK	A. Umadevi	DMDK	K. Mohankumar
Tiruvarur	178	Mannargudi	CPI	V. Sivapunniam	ADMK	R. Kamaraj	DMDK	N. Muthiya
Thanjavur	179	Pattukkottai	INC	N. R. Rengarajan	MDMK	S. Viswanathan	DMDK	N. Senthilkumar
Thanjavur	180	Peravurani	INC	S. V. T. Sambandam	ADMK	M. V. R. Veerakapilan	DMDK	V. S. K. Palanivel
Thanjavur	181	Orathanad	DMK	P. Rajamanickam	ADMK	R. Vaithilingam	DMDK	R. Ramesh
Thanjavur	182	Thiruvonam	DMK	T. Mahesh Krishnasamy	ADMK	K. Thangamuthu	DMDK	M. Sivakumar
Thanjavur	183	Thanjavur	DMK	S. N. M. Ubayadullah	ADMK	M. Rengasamy	DMDK	P. Sivanesan
Thanjavur	184	Thiruvaiyaru	DMK	Durai Chandrasekaran	ADMK	Durai. Govindarajan	DMDK	N. Mahendran
Thanjavur	185	Papanasam	INC	M. Ramkumar	ADMK	R. Doraikkannu	DMDK	N. Maruthaiyan
Tiruvarur	186	Valangiman (SC)	DMK	S. Senthamil Chelvan	ADMK	Ilamathi Subramanian	DMDK	R. Sooriyamurthi
Thanjavur	187	Kumbakonam	DMK	Ko. Si. Mani	ADMK	Rama Ramanathan	DMDK	G. Devadoss (Kuppal)
Thanjavur	188	Thiruvidamarudur	PMK	G. Alayamani	ADMK	R. K. Bharathi Mohan	DMDK	G. Sankar
Pudukottai	189	Thirumayam	INC	Rm. Subburam	ADMK	M. Radhakrishnan	DMDK	R. Murugesan
Pudukottai	190	Kolathur (SC)	DMK	C. Paranjothi	ADMK	N. Subramanian	DMDK	M. Udayakumar
Pudukottai	191	Pudukkottai	DMK	M. Jaffarali	ADMK	R. Nedunchezhiyan	DMDK	S. Javaheer
Pudukottai	192	Alangudi	CPI	S. Rajasekaran	ADMK	A. Venkatachalam	DMDK	K. Selvinraj
Pudukottai	193	Arantangi	DMK	Udayam Shanmugam	ADMK	Y. Karthikeyan	DMDK	O. S. M. Md. Ali Jinnah
Sivaganga	194	Tiruppattur	DMK	K. R. Periyakaruppan	ADMK	K. K. Umadhevan	DMDK	M. Alaguraj
Sivaganga	195	Karaikudi	INC	N. Sundaram	ADMK	O. L. Venkatachalam	DMDK	D. Baskaran
Sivaganga	196	Tiruvadanai	INC	K. R. Ramasamy	ADMK	C. Animuthu	DMDK	P. Thiruvengadam
Sivaganga	197	Ilayangudi	DMK	Raja Kannappan	ADMK	K. Ayyachamy	DMDK	V. Manimaran
Sivaganga	198	Sivaganga	CPI	S. Gunasekaran	MDMK	S. Sevanthiappan	DMDK	C. R. Balu
Sivaganga	199	Manamadurai (SC)	INC	K. Paramalai	ADMK	M. Gunasekaran	DMDK	P. Mayandi
Ramanathapuram	200	Paramakudi (SC)	INC	R. Ramprabhu	ADMK	S. Sundararaj	DMDK	A. Thirumamalai Raja
Ramanathapuram	201	Ramanathapuram	INC	K. Hussan Ali	MDMK	M. Palanichamy	DMDK	S. Dharmaraj
Ramanathapuram	202	Kadaladi	DMK	Suba Thangavelan	ADMK	V. Sathiamoorthy	DMDK	S. Singai Jinnah
Ramanathapuram	203	Mudukulathur	DMK	K. Murugavel	ADMK	S. P. Kalimuthu	DMDK	M. Sivakumar
Virudunagar	204	Aruppukottai	DMK	Thangam Thennarasu	ADMK	K. Murugan	DMDK	A. Bharathi Thasan
Virudunagar	205	Sattur	DMK	Sattur Ramachandran	ADMK	G. Chockeswaran	DMDK	S. S. K. Sankaralingam
Virudunagar	206	Virudhunagar	INC	S. Dhamodharan	MDMK	R. Varadarajan	DMDK	A. Subburaj
Virudunagar	207	Sivakasi	DMK	V. Thangaraj	MDMK	R. Gnanadoss	DMDK	V. Rajendran
Virudunagar	208	Srivilliputhur	CPI	T. Ramasamy	ADMK	R. Vinayagamoorthy	DMDK	R. Dhamotharakannan
Virudunagar	209	Rajapalayam (SC)	DMK	V. P. Rajan	ADMK	M. Chandra	DMDK	N. Ayyanar
Thoothukudi	210	Vilathikulam	DMK	K. Rajaram	ADMK	P. Chinnappan	DMDK	S. Balakrishnan
Thoothukudi	211	Ottapidaram (SC)	DMK	S. X. Rajamannar	ADMK	P. Mohan	DMDK	K. Mohanraj
Thoothukudi	212	Koilpatti	CPI	S. Rajendran	ADMK	L. Radhakrishnan	DMDK	T. Srinivasaraghavan
Tirunelveli	213	Sankarankovil (SC)	DMK	S. Thangavelu	ADMK	C. Karuppasamy	DMDK	K. Muthukumar
Tirunelveli	214	Vasudevanallur (SC)	CPI(M)	R. Krishnan	MDMK	T. SadhanTirumalaikumar	DMDK	S. Pitchai
Tirunelveli	215	Kadayanallur	INC	S. Peter Alphonse	ADMK	U. H. Kamaludeen		
Tirunelveli	216	Tenkasi	DMK	Karuppasamy Pandian	MDMK	Rama. Udayasuriyan	DMDK	S. Kamaraj
Tirunelveli	217	Alangulam	DMK	Poongothai Aladi Aruna	ADMK	M. Pandiaraj	DMDK	K. Muthukumarasamy
Tirunelveli	218	Tirunelveli	DMK	N. Malai Raja	ADMK	Nainar Nagendran		
Tirunelveli	219	Palayamcottai	DMK	T. P. M. Mohideen Khan	ADMK	K. M. Nijamudeen	DMDK	K. A. K. K.Kaleel Raguman
Tirunelveli	220	Cheranmahadevi	INC	P. Veldurai	ADMK	P. H. Manoj Pandian	DMDK	S. Rajendranathan
Tirunelveli	221	Ambasamudram	DMK	R. Avudaiyappan	ADMK	R. Murugaiah Pandian	DMDK	S. Ponraj
Tirunelveli	222	Nanguneri	INC	H. Vasanthakumar	ADMK	S. P. Sooriyakumar	DMDK	I. Packia Raj
Tirunelveli	223	Radhapuram	DMK	M. Appavu	ADMK	L. Gnanapunitha	DMDK	S. Sivanaintha Perumal
Thoothukudi	224	Sattangulam	INC	Rani Venkatesan	MDMK	P. Nazareth Durai	DMDK	V. Diamond Raja
Thoothukudi	225	Tiruchendur	DMK	A. D. K. Jeyaseelan	ADMK	Anitha R. Radhakrishnan	DMDK	A. Ganesan
Thoothukudi	226	Srivaikuntam	INC	D. Selvaraj	ADMK	S. P. Shunmuganathan	DMDK	C. Sathiya Seelan
Thoothukudi	227	Tuticorin	DMK	P. Geetha Jeevan	ADMK	S. Danielraj	DMDK	G. V. Peterraj
Kanniyakumari	228	Kanniyakumari	DMK	N. Suresh Rajan	ADMK	Thalavai N. Sundaram	DMDK	A. Alex Shantha Sekar
Kanniyakumari	229	Nagercoil	DMK	A. Rajan	MDMK	S. Rethinaraj	DMDK	A. V. M. Lion Rajan
Kanniyakumari	230	Colachel	INC	S. Jeyapaul	ADMK	K. T. Pachaimal	DMDK	S. Wellington
Kanniyakumari	231	Padmanabhapuram	DMK	T. Theodre Reginald	ADMK	K. P. Rajendra Prasad	DMDK	C. Selvin
Kanniyakumari	232	Thiruvattar	CPI(M)	R. Leema Rose	ADMK	P. C. N. Thilak Kumar	DMDK	D. Jeganathan
Kanniyakumari	233	Vilavancode	CPI(M)	G. John Joseph	ADMK	F. Franklin	DMDK	L. Idan Sony
Kanniyakumari	234	Killiyoor	INC	S. John Jacob	ADMK	D. Kumaradhas	DMDK	A. Richmohanraj

== Opinion polling ==
=== Pre-poll surveys ===
Agency	Dates	Results
Goodwill Communications	25 April 2006 (Reported)	DMK+: 149 (49% of the vote); AIADMK+: 83 (39% of the vote); Others/Undecided: 2 (12% of the vote)
CNN-IBN - The Hindu	14 March 2006	AIADMK+: Too close to call (46% of the vote); DMK+: Too close to call (44% of the vote); Tossup: Too close to call (10% of the vote)

=== Exit polls ===
Agency	Dates	Results
CNN-IBN - The Hindu	11 May 2006 (Reported)	DMK+: 157-167 (45% of the vote); AIADMK+: 64-74 (35% of the vote); Others: 2-6 (20% of the vote)
Vikatan	10 May 2006	DMK+: 207; AIADMK+: 26; BJP: 1

Hindu-CNN-IBN Exit Poll Voting Pattern in Tamil Nadu
Region	DPA (DMK+)	AIADMK+	DMDK
Vanniyars: PMK could not swing the community towards DMK alliance, especially in the North Central Region
Upper North	40%	45%	11%
North Central	53%	32%	9%
Cauvery Delta	55%	28%	10%
West	53%	28%	11%
Thevars: No longer with AIADMK in Cauvery Delta and the West
Cauvery Delta	51%	38%	7%
West	43%	39%	11%
South	39%	44%	8%
Deep South	13%	52%	2%
Muslims in favor of DMK alliance, especially in Deep South
Upper North	43%	30%	18%
North Central	36%	39%	18%
Cauvery Delta	53%	37%	5%
West	50%	31%	10%
South	50%	38%	7%
Deep South	73%	9%	5%
Christians stayed with DMK alliance, especially in the South
Upper North	49%	29%	13%
North Central	47%	36%	12%
Cauvery Delta	46%	39%	9%
West	48%	29%	10%
South	60%	33%	4%
Deep South	64%	16%	7%

== Voting and results ==
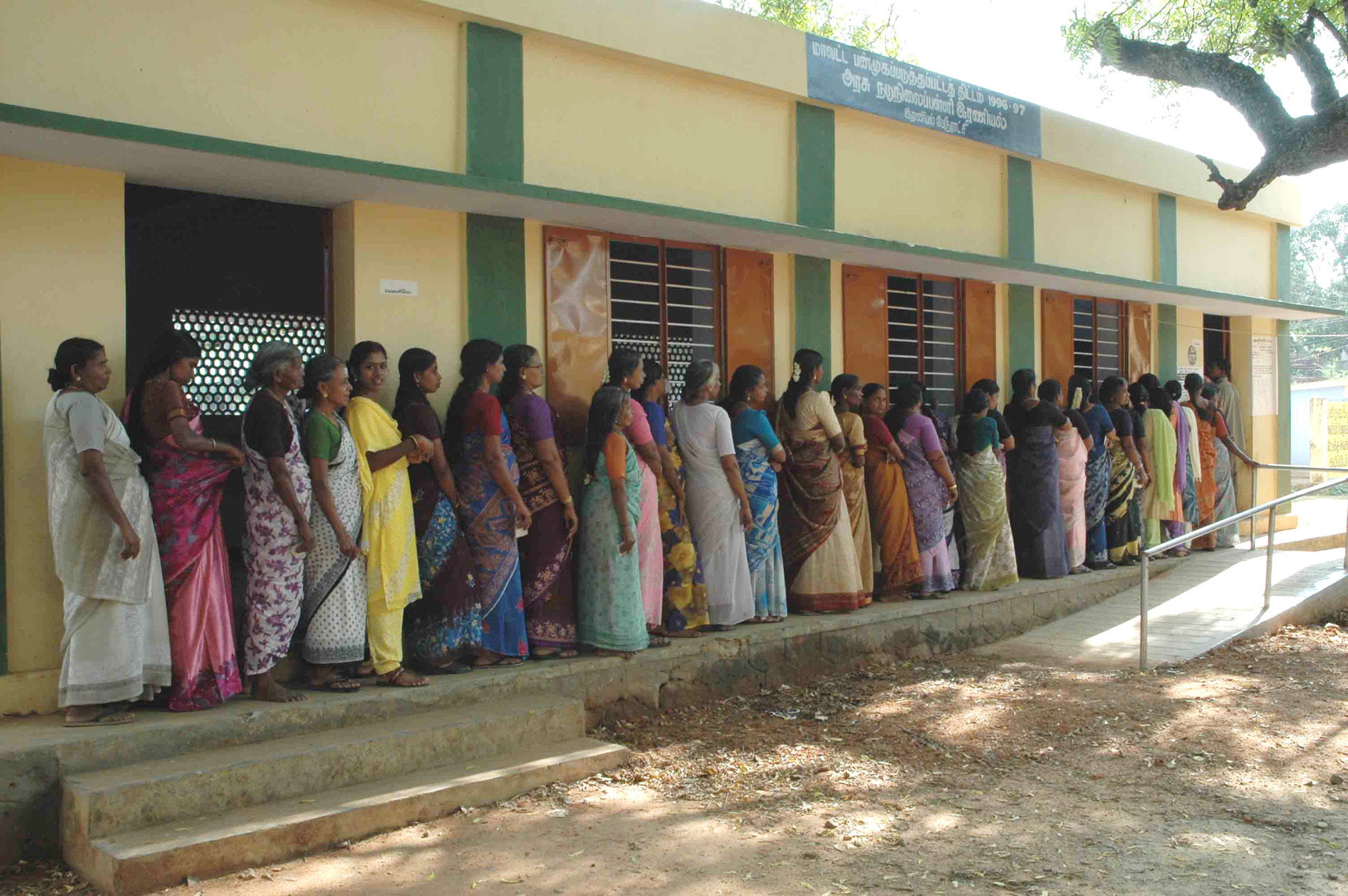
Women voters in a long queue, waiting for their turn to exercise franchise rights during assembly election-2006, at a polling booth in Kanyakumari.

The 2006 Tamil Nadu State Elections saw a record voter turnout of 70.70% an 11% increase compared to the last 2001 elections and the highest since the 1991 elections which saw an 85% voter turnout. The ruling party AIADMK was voted out of power with the DMK alliance regaining power after losing out in the previous elections with a paltry 37 seats. This time however, no party reached the simple majority of 117 of the 234 seats. DMK grabbed the highest number of seats (96) for any contesting party, while AIADMK followed with 61 seats. The Congress won 34 seats while the other national party, Bharatiya Janata Party (BJP), drew blank after contesting alone in this elections. PMK managed to win 18 seats followed by the Communists (15 seats). MDMK, the party that jumped alliance won 6 seats and the DPI won 2 seats. DMDK, even while contesting in 232 seats managed to score just one seat, with the party leader actor vijayakant winning the seat he contested in Vridhachalam Constituency. There was 1 independent winner.

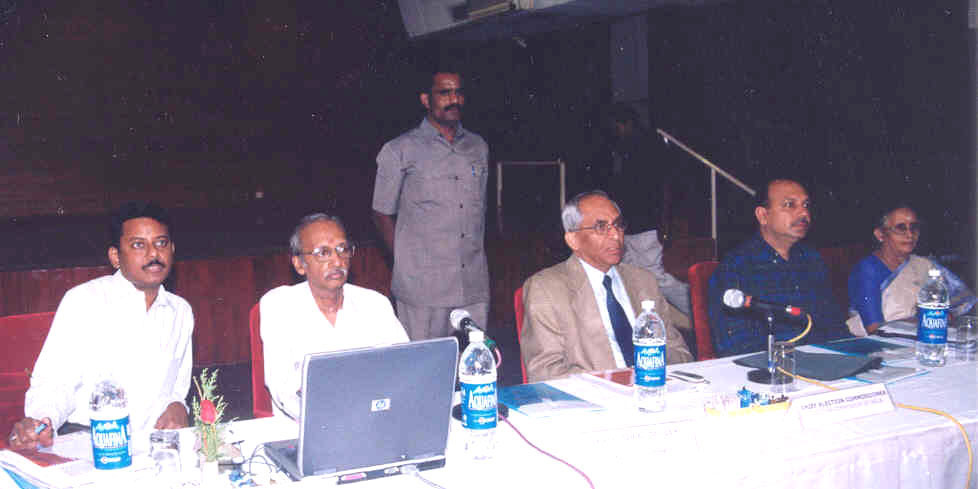
The Chief Election Commissioner Shri. B.B. Tandon reviewing the arrangements for elections at a meeting of 15 district collectors in Madurai

The split results paved way for the formation of the new coalition government led by DMK chief, the 82-year-old veteran politician Dr.M Karunanidhi, becoming the Chief Minister of Tamil Nadu for the fifth time, with the Congress unconditionally supporting his claim for Chief Ministership and government formation.

Due to the loss of key allies after the previous election, the All India Anna Dravida Munnetra Kazhagam (AIADMK), ended up losing both the 2004 Lok Sabha Election and the 2006 State Assembly Elections, to DMK led coalition that consisted of Dravida Munnetra Kazhagam (DMK), and former allies of AIADMK, Indian National Congress, left parties (Communist Party of India, Communist Party of India (Marxist)) and Pattali Makkal Katchi.

=== Results by pre-poll alliance ===
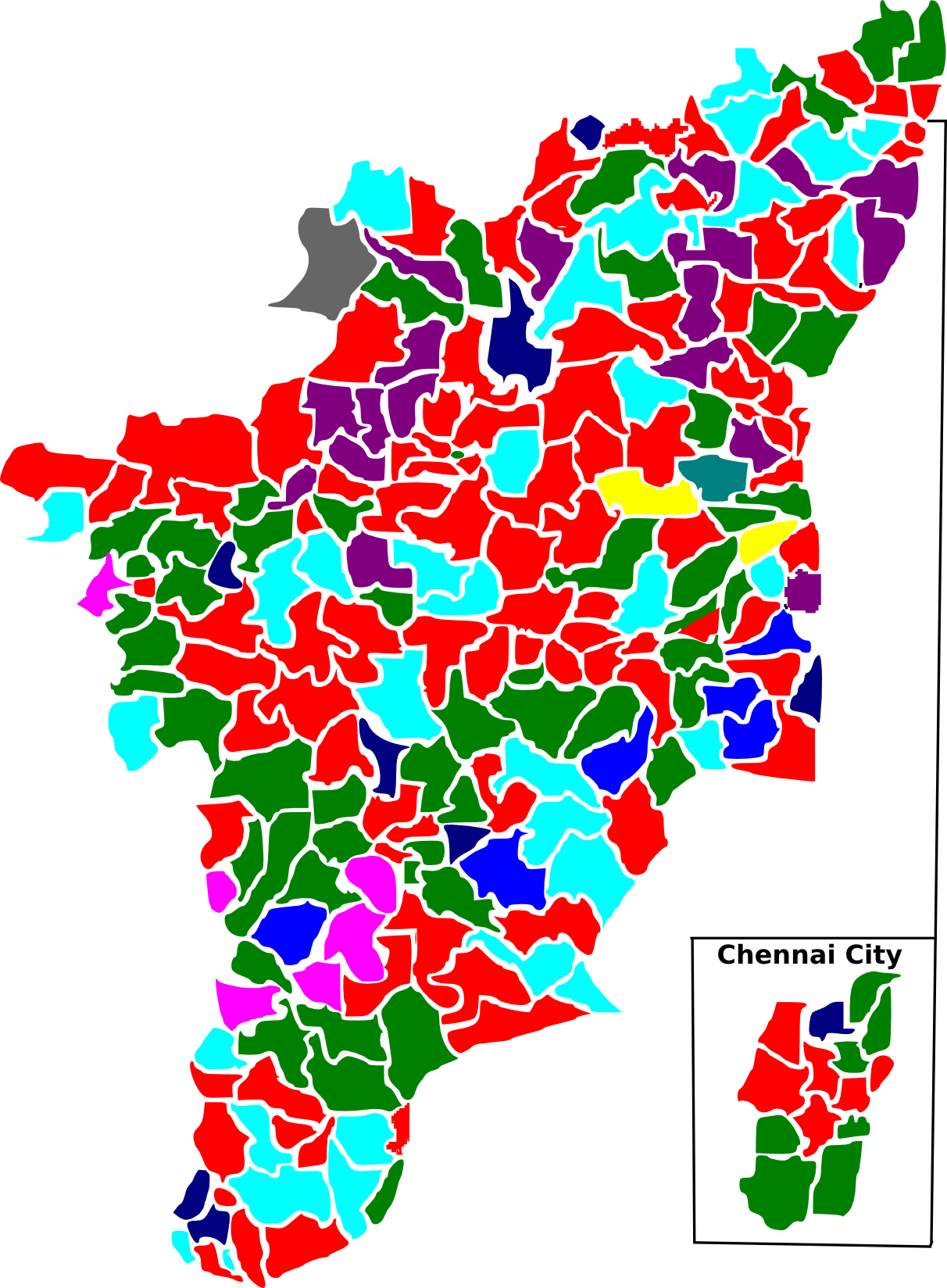
Election map of results based on parties. Colours are based on the results table on the left

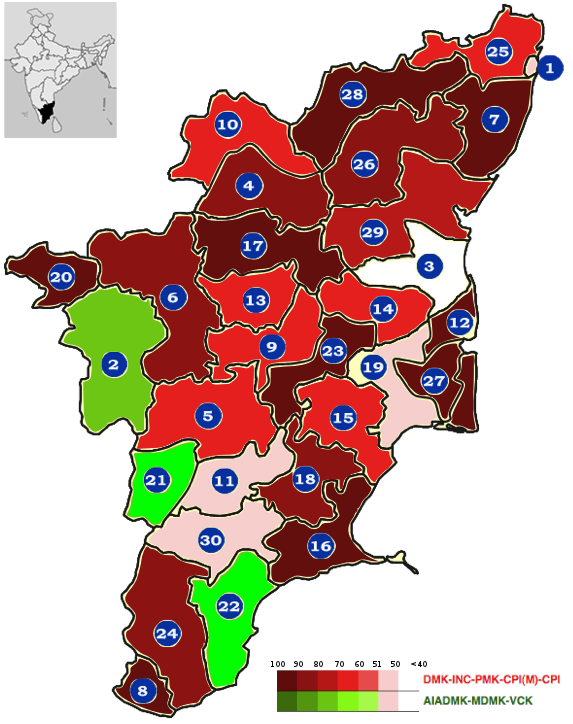
Election map based on % seats won by district

Summary of the 2006 May Tamil Nadu Legislative Assembly election results
Alliance/Party	Seats won	Change^{†}	Popular Vote	Vote %	Adj. %^{‡}
DMK+ alliance	163	+71	14,762,647	44.8%	
DMK	96	+65	8,728,716	26.5%	46.0%
INC	34	+4	2,765,768	8.4%	43.5%
PMK	18	-2	1,863,749	5.7%	43.4%
CPI(M)	9	+3	872,674	2.7%	42.7%
CPI	6	+1	531,740	1.6%	40.4%
ADMK+ alliance	69	-64	13,166,445	39.9%	
AIADMK	61	-71	10,768,559	32.6%	40.8%
MDMK	6	+6	1,971,565	6.0%	37.7%
VCK	2	+2	426,321	1.3%	36.1%
Others	2	-7	5,062,463	15.3%	
DMDK	1	+1	2,764,223	8.4%	8.5%
BJP	0	-6	666,823	2.0%	2.1%
IND	1	-2	995,345	3.0%	3.1%
Total	234	–	32,991,555	100%	–

Sources: Election Commission of India

†: Seat changes reflect the following mergers in parties from previous election. MADMK merged with Bharatiya Janata Party in 2002. TMC merged with the national party INC in 2002. Usilampatti FBL MLA L. Santhanam, joined AIADMK and contested in Sholavandan, after being expelled from his party by newly elected actor-turned party leader Karthik.
‡: Vote % reflects the percentage of votes the party received compared to the entire electorate that voted in this election. Adjusted (Adj.) Vote %, reflects the % of votes the party received per constituency that they contested.

=== Result Analysis ===
The DMK and the AIADMK faced each other in 115 constituencies, with the DMK winning 81 seats and the AIADMK 34. The actor-turned politician Vijayakanth-led Desiya Murpokku Dravida Kazhagam (DMDK), contesting separately, polled about 8.4% of the vote, and in 63 constituencies its vote share exceeded the margin of victory. Barring Vijayakanth, no other DMDK candidate won a seat. The party recorded double-digit vote shares in seven districts and narrowly fell short of 10% in Kancheepuram and Virudhunagar districts. A post-poll study by the Centre for the Study of Developing Societies (CSDS) found that fewer than 25% of supporters of Vijayakanth had backed the AIADMK in the 2004 Indian general election, while over two-thirds of those who voted for the DMDK in 2006 assembly elections had supported the DMK-led DPA alliance in 2004 Lok Sabha polls. For the first time, Jayalalithaa-led AIADMK secured 7 of the 14 seats in the DMK stronghold of Chennai City, which even M. G. Ramachandran could not break in his lifetime in an election widely regarded as lacking a clear wave.

=== Results by district ===
District	Seats			
District	Seats	DMK+	ADK+	OTH
Chennai	14	7	7	—N/a
Tiruvallur	8	5	3	—N/a
Kanchipuram	9	9	—N/a	—N/a
Vellore	12	11	1	—N/a
Tiruvannamalai	9	8	1	—N/a
Villupuram	12	9	3	—N/a
Cuddalore	9	4	4	1
Krishnagiri	5	3	1	1
Dharmapuri	5	4	1	—N/a
Salem	12	11	1	—N/a
Namakkal	5	4	1	—N/a
Coimbatore	17	7	10	—N/a
Erode	8	6	2	—N/a
Nilgiris	3	3	—N/a	—N/a
Dindigul	7	5	2	—N/a
Karur	4	3	1	—N/a
Tiruchirapalli	9	7	2	—N/a
Perambalur	5	3	2	—N/a
Thanjavur	9	5	4	—N/a
Nagapattinam	6	6	—N/a	—N/a
Tiruvarur	5	4	1	—N/a
Pudukottai	5	3	2	—N/a
Sivaganga	6	5	1	—N/a
Ramanathapuram	4	4	—N/a	—N/a
Virudunagar	6	3	3	—N/a
Madurai	9	4	5	—N/a
Theni	6	1	5	—N/a
Thoothukudi	7	3	4	—N/a
Tirunelveli	11	9	2	—N/a
Kanyakumari	7	7	—N/a	—N/a
Total	234	163	69	2

=== By Region ===
Alliance-wise Results
Region	Total Seats	DMK-led Democratic Progressive Alliance	AIADMK-led Democratic People Alliance
Northern Tamil Nadu	73	53 / 73 (73%)	19 / 73 (26%)
Western Tamil Nadu	66	46 / 66 (70%)	19 / 66 (29%)
Southern TamilNadu	56	36 / 56 (64%)	20 / 56 (36%)
Central TamilNadu	39	28 / 39 (72%)	11 / 39 (28%)

=== Results by constituency ===
The following table lists the winners and margin of victory in all constituencies.

District	Constituency		Winner				Runner Up				Margin	%
District	#	Name	Candidate	Party	Votes	%	Candidate	Party	Votes	%	Margin	%
Chennai	1	Royapuram	D. Jayakumar	ADMK	50,647	53.26	S. P. Sarguna Pandian	DMK	37,144	39.06	13,503	14.20
Chennai	2	Harbour	K. Anbazhagan	DMK	26,545	44.24	H. Seema Basheer	MDMK	26,135	43.55	410	0.69
Chennai	3	Dr. R. K. Nagar	P. K. Sekar Babu	ADMK	84,462	50.36	R. Manohar	INC	66,399	39.59	18,063	10.77
Chennai	4	Park Town	K. Srinivasan	ADMK	34,314	47.06	A. Rahman Khan	DMK	27,957	38.34	6,357	8.72
Chennai	5	Perambur (SC)	K. Mahendran	CPI(M)	81,765	44.83	P. Manimaran	MDMK	78,977	43.30	2,788	1.53
Chennai	6	Purasawalkam	V. S. Babu	DMK	90,168	47.04	Venkatesh Babu	ADMK	82,783	43.19	7,385	3.85
Chennai	7	Egmore (SC)	Parithi Ilamvazhuthi	DMK	38,455	48.48	C. E. Sathya	MDMK	31,975	40.31	6,480	8.17
Chennai	8	Anna Nagar	Arcot N. Veeraswami	DMK	100,099	46.20	Vijaya Thayanban	MDMK	87,709	40.48	12,390	5.72
Chennai	9	Theagaraya Nagar	V. P. Kalairajan	ADMK	74,131	48.57	J. Anbazhagan	DMK	57,654	37.77	16,477	10.80
Chennai	10	Thousand Lights	M. K. Stalin	DMK	49,817	46.00	Adhirajaram	ADMK	47,349	43.72	2,468	2.28
Chennai	11	Chepauk	M. Karunanidhi	DMK	34,188	50.96	Dawoon Miakhan	IND	25,662	38.25	8,526	12.71
Chennai	12	Triplicane	Bader Sayeed	ADMK	40,404	47.25	M. Naganathan	DMK	37,628	44.01	2,776	3.24
Chennai	13	Mylapore	S. Ve. Shekher	ADMK	62,794	42.62	D. Napoleon	DMK	61,127	41.49	1,667	1.13
Chennai	14	Saidapet	G. Senthamizhan	ADMK	75,973	46.24	C. R. Baskaran	PMK	70,068	42.65	5,905	3.59
Tiruvallur	15	Gummidipundi	K. S. Vijayakumar	ADMK	63,147	40.41	Durai Jeyavelu	PMK	62,918	40.26	229	0.15
Tiruvallur	16	Ponneri (SC)	P. Balaraman	ADMK	84,259	48.08	V. Anbuvanan	DMK	73,170	41.76	11,089	6.32
Tiruvallur	17	Thiruvottiyur	K. P. P. Samy	DMK	158,204	46.34	V. Moorthy	ADMK	154,757	45.33	3,447	1.01
Tiruvallur	18	Villivakkam	B. Ranganathan	DMK	278,850	45.63	G. Kalan	ADMK	248,734	40.70	30,116	4.93
Kanchipuram	19	Alandur	T. M. Anbarasan	DMK	133,232	46.85	B. Valarmathi	ADMK	115,322	40.55	17,910	6.30
Kanchipuram	20	Tambaram	S. R. Raja	DMK	269,717	48.00	K. Somu	MDMK	220,965	39.33	48,752	8.67
Kanchipuram	21	Tirupporur (SC)	D. Moorthy	PMK	73,328	45.07	M. Dhanapal	ADMK	63,164	38.82	10,164	6.25
Kanchipuram	22	Chengalpattu	K. Arumugam	PMK	61,664	48.37	S. Arumugam	ADMK	51,451	40.36	10,213	8.01
Kanchipuram	23	Maduranthakam	K. Ghayathri Devi	INC	51,106	43.52	K. Appadurai	ADMK	47,415	40.38	3,691	3.14
Kanchipuram	24	Acharapakkam (SC)	Sankaravalli	DMK	55,116	50.56	M. Saraswathi	ADMK	39,260	36.02	15,856	14.54
Kanchipuram	25	Uthiramerur	K. Sundar	DMK	70,488	48.75	V. Somasundaram	ADMK	58,472	40.44	12,016	8.31
Kanchipuram	26	Kancheepuram	P. Kamalambal	PMK	81,366	47.11	T. Mythili	ADMK	70,082	40.57	11,284	6.54
Kanchipuram	27	Sriperumbudur (SC)	D. Yasodha	INC	70,066	43.78	K. Balakrishnan	VCK	52,272	32.66	17,794	11.12
Tiruvallur	28	Poonamallee	D. Sudarsanam	INC	98,920	48.49	R. Senguttuvan	MDMK	83,590	40.98	15,330	7.51
Tiruvallur	29	Tiruvallur	E. A. P. Sivaji	DMK	64,378	48.14	B. V. Ramanaa	ADMK	55,454	41.47	8,924	6.67
Tiruvallur	30	Tiruttani	G. Hari	ADMK	52,871	43.10	G. Eraviraj	PMK	51,955	42.35	916	0.75
Tiruvallur	31	Pallipet	E. S. S. Raman	INC	58,534	46.21	P. M. Narasimhan	ADMK	51,219	40.43	7,315	5.78
Vellore	32	Arkonam (SC)	M. Jagan Moorthy	DMK	66,338	47.17	S. Ravi	ADMK	58,782	41.79	7,556	5.38
Vellore	33	Sholinghur	D. Arul Anbarasu	INC	63,502	45.98	C. Gopal	ADMK	55,586	40.25	7,916	5.73
Vellore	34	Ranipet	R. Gandhi	DMK	92,584	55.01	R. Thamizharasan	ADMK	60,489	35.94	32,095	19.07
Vellore	35	Arcot	K. L. Elavazhagan	PMK	60,286	48.73	V. R. Chandran	ADMK	48,969	39.58	11,317	9.15
Vellore	36	Katpadi	Durai Murugan	DMK	86,824	57.45	B. Narayanan	ADMK	51,677	34.20	35,147	23.25
Vellore	37	Gudiyatham	G. Latha	CPI(M)	48,166	39.70	J. K. N. Palani	ADMK	46,516	38.34	1,650	1.36
Tiruvannamalai	38	Pernambut (SC)	A. Chinnasamy	DMK	65,805	50.05	S. Chandra Settu	ADMK	48,890	37.18	16,915	12.87
Vellore	39	Vaniayambadi	H. Abdul Basith	DMK	69,837	53.17	K. Mohamed Ali	ADMK	45,653	34.76	24,184	18.41
Vellore	40	Natrampalli	N. K. R. Sooriyakumar	DMK	78,689	50.80	K. G. Subramani	ADMK	61,446	39.66	17,243	11.14
Vellore	41	Tiruppattur	T. K. Raja	PMK	71,932	49.00	K. C. Azhagiri	MDMK	58,193	39.64	13,739	9.36
Vellore	42	Chengam (SC)	Polur Varadhan	INC	53,366	42.86	P. Sakthivel	VCK	43,166	34.67	10,200	8.19
Tiruvannamalai	43	Thandarambattu	E. V. Velu	DMK	81,592	56.81	S. Ramachandran	ADMK	50,891	35.43	30,701	21.38
Tiruvannamalai	44	Tiruvannamalai	K. Pitchandi	DMK	74,773	50.20	V. Pavan Kumar	ADMK	61,970	41.60	12,803	8.60
Tiruvannamalai	45	Kalasapakkam	S. S. Krishnamurthy	ADMK	68,586	48.38	R. Kalodoss	PMK	60,920	42.97	7,666	5.41
Tiruvannamalai	46	Polur	P. S. Vijayakumar	INC	58,595	47.23	T. Vediyappan	ADMK	51,051	41.15	7,544	6.08
Vellore	47	Anaicut	K. Pandurangan	ADMK	59,220	45.08	M. Varalakshmi	PMK	59,167	45.04	53	0.04
Vellore	48	Vellore	C. Gnanasekharan	INC	63,957	47.46	N. Subramani	MDMK	42,120	31.25	21,837	16.21
Tiruvannamalai	49	Arni	R. Sivanandam	DMK	69,722	49.64	A. Santhanam	ADMK	57,420	40.88	12,302	8.76
Tiruvannamalai	50	Cheyyar	M. K. Vishnu Prasad	INC	60,109	44.62	R. Pavai	ADMK	55,319	41.07	4,790	3.55
Tiruvannamalai	51	Vandavasi (SC)	S. P. Jayaraman	DMK	65,762	53.49	M. Chakkrapani	ADMK	42,974	34.95	22,788	18.54
Tiruvannamalai	52	Peranamallur	G. Edirolimanian	PMK	56,331	46.64	A. K. S. Anbalagan	ADMK	49,643	41.10	6,688	5.54
Villupuram	53	Melmalayanur	P. Senthamizhselvan	PMK	56,758	45.96	Tamilmozhi Rajathathan	ADMK	45,457	36.81	11,301	9.15
Villupuram	54	Gingee	V. Kannan	DMK	62,350	48.18	R. Masilamani	MDMK	49,417	38.18	12,933	10.00
Villupuram	55	Tindivanam	C. V. Shanmugam	ADMK	55,856	47.32	M. Karunanithi	PMK	53,648	45.45	2,208	1.87
Villupuram	56	Vanur (SC)	N. Ganapathy	ADMK	59,978	42.63	N. Soundararajan	PMK	55,942	39.76	4,036	2.87
Villupuram	57	Kandamangalam (SC)	S. Pushparaj	DMK	64,620	46.41	V. Subramaniyan	ADMK	57,245	41.12	7,375	5.29
Villupuram	58	Villupuram	K. Ponmudy	DMK	72,462	47.25	R. Pasupathy	ADMK	62,714	40.89	9,748	6.36
Villupuram	59	Mugaiyur	V. A. T. Kaliyavarathan	PMK	46,313	36.23	M. Sinthanai Selvan	VCK	26,807	20.97	19,506	15.26
Villupuram	60	Thirunavalur	R. Kumaraguru	ADMK	57,235	45.57	V. S. Veerapandian	DMK	51,048	40.65	6,187	4.92
Villupuram	61	Ulundurpet (SC)	K. Thirunavukarasu	DMK	65,662	44.05	E. Vijayaraghavan	VCK	46,878	31.45	18,784	12.60
Cuddalore	62	Nellikuppam	Saba Rajendran	DMK	57,403	46.16	R. T. Sabapathi Mohan	MDMK	45,323	36.44	12,080	9.72
Cuddalore	63	Cuddalore	G. Iyappan	DMK	67,003	47.76	G. Kumar	ADMK	60,737	43.30	6,266	4.46
Cuddalore	64	Panruti	T. Velmurugan	PMK	54,653	38.18	R. Rajendiran	ADMK	54,505	38.08	148	0.10
Cuddalore	65	Kurinjipadi	M. R. K. Panneerselvam	DMK	56,462	45.64	N. Ramalingam	MDMK	54,547	44.09	1,915	1.55
Cuddalore	66	Bhuvanagiri	Selvi Ramajayam	ADMK	65,505	51.24	K. Devadass	PMK	50,682	39.65	14,823	11.59
Cuddalore	67	Kattumannarkoil (SC)	D. Ravikumar	VCK	57,244	51.46	P. Vallalperuman	INC	43,830	39.40	13,414	12.06
Cuddalore	68	Chidambaram	A. Arunmozhithevan	ADMK	56,327	50.72	K. Balakrishnan	CPI(M)	39,517	35.58	16,810	15.14
Cuddalore	69	Vridhachalam	Vijayakanth	DMDK	61,337	40.42	R. Govindasamy	PMK	47,560	31.34	13,777	9.08
Cuddalore	70	Mangalore (SC)	K. Selvam	VCK	62,217	43.71	V. Ganesan	DMK	55,303	38.85	6,914	4.86
Villupuram	71	Rishivandiam	S. Sivaraj	INC	54,793	42.74	L. Athinarayanan	ADMK	46,858	36.55	7,935	6.19
Villupuram	72	Chinnasalem	T. Udhayasuriyan	DMK	64,036	48.40	P. Mohan	ADMK	43,758	33.08	20,278	15.32
Villupuram	73	Sankarapuram	A. Angaiyarkanni	DMK	62,970	43.47	P. Sanniyasi	ADMK	60,504	41.77	2,466	1.70
Krishnagiri	74	Hosur	K. Gopinath	INC	90,647	42.08	V. Sampangiramaiah	ADMK	78,096	36.26	12,551	5.82
Krishnagiri	75	Thalli	T. Ramachandran	IND	30,032	24.24	P. Nagaraja Reddy	CPI	25,437	20.53	4,595	3.71
Krishnagiri	76	Kaveripattinam	T. A. Meganathan	PMK	64,878	45.96	K. P. Munusamy	ADMK	53,144	37.64	11,734	8.32
Krishnagiri	77	Krishnagiri	T. Senguttuvan	DMK	69,068	49.24	V. Govindaraj	ADMK	50,873	36.27	18,195	12.97
Krishnagiri	78	Bargur	M. Thambidurai	ADMK	61,299	42.67	V. Vetriselvan	DMK	58,091	40.44	3,208	2.23
Dharmapuri	79	Harur (SC)	P. Dillibabu	CPI(M)	71,030	45.70	K. Govindasamy	VCK	57,337	36.89	13,693	8.81
Dharmapuri	80	Morappur	V. Mullaivendhan	DMK	64,962	51.24	K. Singaram	ADMK	51,771	40.83	13,191	10.41
Dharmapuri	81	Palacode	K. P. Anbalagan	ADMK	66,711	44.21	K. Mannan	PMK	61,867	41.00	4,844	3.21
Dharmapuri	82	Dharmapuri	L. Velusamy	PMK	76,195	51.58	V. S. Sampath	MDMK	45,988	31.13	30,207	20.45
Dharmapuri	83	Pennagaram	P. N. Periannan	DMK	74,109	49.43	S. R. Vetrivel	ADMK	47,177	31.47	26,932	17.96
Salem	84	Mettur	G. K. Mani	PMK	66,250	47.94	K. Kandasamy	ADMK	55,112	39.88	11,138	8.06
Salem	85	Taramangalam	P. Kannan	PMK	49,045	34.60	P. Govindan	IND	36,791	25.95	12,254	8.65
Salem	86	Omalur	A. Tamizharasu	PMK	58,287	43.38	C. Krishnan	ADMK	54,624	40.66	3,663	2.72
Salem	87	Yercaud (ST)	C. Tamilselvan	DMK	48,791	42.94	J. Alamelu	ADMK	44,684	39.33	4,107	3.61
Salem	88	Salem-I	L. Ravichandran	ADMK	69,083	44.12	M. R. Suresh	INC	56,266	35.94	12,817	8.18
Salem	89	Salem-II	V. S. Arumugam	DMK	85,348	47.27	R. Sureshkumar	ADMK	70,605	39.11	14,743	8.16
Salem	90	Veerapandi	A. Rajendran	DMK	90,477	42.51	P. Vijayalakshmi	ADMK	88,839	41.74	1,638	0.77
Salem	91	Panamarathupatty	R. Rajendran	DMK	73,210	44.58	R. Elangovan	ADMK	69,321	42.21	3,889	2.37
Salem	92	Attur	M. R. Sundaram	INC	53,617	45.29	A. K. Murugesan	ADMK	43,185	36.48	10,432	8.81
Salem	93	Talavasal (SC)	K. Chinnadurai	DMK	60,287	45.69	P. Elangovan	ADMK	50,238	38.08	10,049	7.61
Namakkal	94	Rasipuram	K. P. Ramaswamy	DMK	62,629	45.47	P. R. Sundaram	ADMK	57,660	41.86	4,969	3.61
Namakkal	95	Sendamangalam (ST)	K. Ponnusamy	DMK	64,506	49.91	P. Chandran	ADMK	47,972	37.12	16,534	12.79
Namakkal	96	Namakkal (SC)	K. Jeyakumar	INC	61,306	42.57	R. Saradha	ADMK	53,207	36.95	8,099	5.62
Namakkal	97	Kapilamalai	K. Nedunchezhian	PMK	58,048	47.25	T. N. Guruswamy	MDMK	49,101	39.96	8,947	7.29
Namakkal	98	Tiruchengode	P. Thangamani	ADMK	85,471	40.30	S. Gandhiselvan	DMK	85,355	40.25	116	0.05
Salem	99	Sankari (SC)	V. P. Duraisamy	DMK	67,792	46.85	S. Shanthamani	ADMK	51,372	35.50	16,420	11.35
Salem	100	Edapadi	V. Kaveri	PMK	76,027	44.76	K. Palaniswami	ADMK	69,680	41.03	6,347	3.73
Coimbatore	101	Mettupalayam	O. K. Chinnaraj	ADMK	67,445	44.50	B. Arunkumar	DMK	67,303	44.41	142	0.09
Coimbatore	102	Avanashi (SC)	R. Prema	ADMK	54,562	40.57	M. Arumugham	CPI	50,023	37.20	4,539	3.37
Coimbatore	103	Thondamuthur	M. Kannappan	MDMK	123,490	41.60	S. R. Balasubramaniam	INC	113,596	38.27	9,894	3.33
Coimbatore	104	Singanallur	R. Chinnasamy	ADMK	100,283	41.74	A. Soundararajan	CPI(M)	100,269	41.73	14	0.01
Coimbatore	105	Coimbatore West	T. Malaravan	ADMK	49,957	49.62	A. S. Maheswari	INC	35,676	35.44	14,281	14.18
Coimbatore	106	Coimbatore East	Pongalur N. Palanisamy	DMK	51,827	47.50	V. Gopalakrishnan	ADMK	45,491	41.69	6,336	5.81
Coimbatore	107	Perur	S. P. Velumani	ADMK	114,024	46.33	N. Rukumani	DMK	99,789	40.54	14,235	5.79
Coimbatore	108	Kinathukkadavu	S. Damodaran	ADMK	55,493	47.10	K. V. Kandaswamy	DMK	50,343	42.73	5,150	4.37
Coimbatore	109	Pollachi	V. Jayaraman	ADMK	62,455	46.02	D. Shanthi Devi	DMK	59,509	43.85	2,946	2.17
Coimbatore	110	Valparai (SC)	N. Kovaithangam	INC	46,561	53.94	S. Kalaiyarasan Susi	VCK	25,582	29.64	20,979	24.30
Coimbatore	111	Udumalpet	C. Shanmugavelu	ADMK	66,178	46.09	C. Veluchamy	DMK	62,715	43.68	3,463	2.41
Coimbatore	112	Dharapuram (SC)	P. Prabavathi	DMK	55,312	44.65	M. Ranganayahi	ADMK	50,600	40.85	4,712	3.80
Coimbatore	113	Vellakoil	M. P. Saminathan	DMK	60,909	51.79	A. Ganeshamurthi	MDMK	43,821	37.26	17,088	14.53
Coimbatore	114	Pongalur	S. Mani	DMK	47,702	41.72	P. V. Damodaran	ADMK	47,649	41.67	53	0.05
Coimbatore	115	Palladam	S. M. Velusamy	ADMK	73,059	43.73	S. S. Ponmudi	DMK	67,542	40.42	5,517	3.31
Coimbatore	116	Tiruppur	C. Govindasamy	CPI(M)	106,073	43.44	S. Duraisamy	MDMK	94,774	38.81	11,299	4.63
Coimbatore	117	Kangayam	S. Sekar	INC	56,946	46.09	N. M. S. Palaniswami	ADMK	49,650	40.18	7,296	5.91
Erode	118	Modakurichi	R. M. Palanisami	INC	64,625	44.11	V. P. Namachivayam	ADMK	60,765	41.48	3,860	2.63
Erode	119	Perundurai	C. Ponnudurai	ADMK	59,631	43.37	N. Periyasamy	CPI	51,053	37.13	8,578	6.24
Erode	120	Erode	N. K. K. P. Raja	DMK	94,938	44.17	E. R. Sivakumar	ADMK	84,107	39.13	10,831	5.04
Erode	121	Bhavani	K. V. Ramanathan	PMK	52,603	41.70	K. C. Karuppannan	ADMK	47,500	37.66	5,103	4.04
Erode	122	Andhiyur (SC)	S. Gurusamy	DMK	57,043	51.47	M. Subramaniam	ADMK	37,300	33.65	19,743	17.82
Erode	123	Gobichettipalayam	K. A. Sengottaiyan	ADMK	55,181	45.70	G. V. Manimaran	DMK	51,162	42.37	4,019	3.33
Erode	124	Bhavanisagar	O. Subramaniam	DMK	65,055	50.96	Sindu Ravichandaran	ADMK	45,039	35.28	20,016	15.68
Erode	125	Sathyamangalam	L. P. Dharmalingam	DMK	56,035	46.28	T. K. Subramaniam	MDMK	40,141	33.15	15,894	13.13
Nilgiris	126	Coonoor (SC)	A. Soundarapandian	DMK	45,303	47.54	M. Selvaraj	ADMK	39,589	41.54	5,714	6.00
Nilgiris	127	Ootacamund	B. Gopalan	INC	45,551	47.74	K. N. Dorai	ADMK	40,992	42.97	4,559	4.77
Nilgiris	128	Gudalur	K. Ramachandran	DMK	74,147	51.89	A. Miller	ADMK	53,915	37.74	20,232	14.15
Dindigul	129	Palani (SC)	M. Anbalakan	DMK	57,181	47.76	S. Prema	ADMK	46,272	38.64	10,909	9.12
Dindigul	130	Oddanchatram	R. Sakkarapani	DMK	63,811	53.89	K. P. Nallasamy	ADMK	43,908	37.08	19,903	16.81
Theni	131	Periyakulam	O. Panneerselvam	ADMK	68,345	49.94	L. Mookiah	DMK	53,511	39.10	14,834	10.84
Theni	132	Theni	R. D. Ganesan	ADMK	62,194	45.72	N. R. T. Rajkumar	INC	55,211	40.59	6,983	5.13
Theni	133	Bodinayakkanur	S. Lakshmanan	DMK	51,474	44.09	R. Parthipan	ADMK	50,576	43.32	898	0.77
Theni	134	Cumbum	N. Eramakrishnan	MDMK	50,761	43.46	P. Selvendran	DMK	48,803	41.78	1,958	1.68
Theni	135	Andipatti	J. Jayalalithaa	ADMK	73,927	55.25	Seeman	DMK	48,741	36.43	25,186	18.82
Theni	136	Sedapatti	C. Durairaj	ADMK	42,590	43.64	G. Thalapathi	DMK	40,541	41.54	2,049	2.10
Madurai	137	Thirumangalam	Veera Elavarasan	MDMK	45,067	37.60	V. Velusamy	DMK	40,923	34.14	4,144	3.46
Madurai	138	Usilampatti	I. Mahendran	ADMK	39,009	42.41	P. V. Kathiravan	DMK	35,964	39.10	3,045	3.31
Dindigul	139	Nilakottai (SC)	S. Thenmozhi	ADMK	53,275	43.55	K. Senthilvel	INC	46,991	38.41	6,284	5.14
Madurai	140	Sholavandan	P. Moorthy	DMK	47,771	42.52	L. Santhanam	ADMK	46,185	41.11	1,586	1.41
Madurai	141	Tirupparankundram	A. K. Bose	ADMK	117,306	42.81	S. Venkatesan	CPI(M)	104,620	38.18	12,686	4.63
Madurai	142	Madurai West	S. V. Shanmugam	ADMK	57,208	43.66	N. Perumal	INC	53,741	41.01	3,467	2.65
Madurai	143	Madurai Central	P. T. R. Palanivel Rajan	DMK	43,185	45.83	S. T. K. Jakkaiyan	ADMK	35,992	38.20	7,193	7.63
Madurai	144	Madurai East	N. Nanmaran	CPI(M)	36,383	38.20	M. Boominathan	MDMK	36,332	38.15	51	0.05
Madurai	145	Samayanallur (SC)	A. Tamilarasi	DMK	124,656	43.45	P. Lakshmi	ADMK	119,012	41.48	5,644	1.97
Madurai	146	Melur	R. Samy	ADMK	64,013	47.32	K. V. V. Ravichandran	INC	60,840	44.97	3,173	2.35
Dindigul	147	Natham	R. Viswanathan	ADMK	62,292	46.62	M. A. Andiambalam	DMK	58,532	43.81	3,760	2.81
Dindigul	148	Dindigul	K. Balabarathi	CPI(M)	66,811	43.74	N. Selvaraghavan	MDMK	47,862	31.33	18,949	12.41
Dindigul	149	Athoor	I. Periyasamy	DMK	76,308	53.20	C. Sreenivasan	ADMK	49,747	34.68	26,561	18.52
Dindigul	150	Vedasandur	M. Dhandapani	INC	68,953	46.16	S. Palanichamy	ADMK	54,195	36.28	14,758	9.88
Karur	151	Aravakurichi	Khaleelur Rahman	DMK	45,960	45.60	P. Monjanur Ramasamy	MDMK	43,135	42.80	2,825	2.80
Karur	152	Karur	V. Senthil Balaji	ADMK	80,214	47.00	Vasuki Murugesan	DMK	74,830	43.84	5,384	3.16
Karur	153	Krishnarayapuram (SC)	P. Kamaraj	DMK	58,394	46.33	R. Sasikala	ADMK	49,460	39.24	8,934	7.09
Tiruchirapalli	154	Marungapuri	C. Chinnasamy	ADMK	57,910	42.87	A. Rokkaiah	DMK	55,378	41.00	2,532	1.87
Karur	155	Kulithalai	R. Manickam	DMK	69,615	50.42	A. Pappa Sundaram	ADMK	55,626	40.29	13,989	10.13
Tiruchirapalli	156	Thottiam	M. Rajasekharan	INC	43,080	34.84	R. Natarajan	MDMK	43,027	34.80	53	0.04
Tiruchirapalli	157	Uppiliapuram (ST)	R. Rani	DMK	59,171	46.98	P. Muthusamy	ADMK	46,789	37.15	12,382	9.83
Tiruchirapalli	158	Musiri	N. Selvaraj	DMK	74,311	48.34	T. P. Poonachi	ADMK	63,384	41.23	10,927	7.11
Tiruchirapalli	159	Lalgudi	A. Soundara Pandian	DMK	62,937	47.62	T. Rajaram	ADMK	59,380	44.93	3,557	2.69
Perambalur	160	Perambalur (SC)	M. Rajkumar	DMK	60,478	45.18	M. Sundaram	ADMK	53,840	40.22	6,638	4.96
Perambalur	161	Varahur (SC)	M. Chandrakasi	ADMK	52,815	43.59	K. Gopalakrishnan	PMK	50,272	41.49	2,543	2.10
Perambalur	162	Ariyalur	D. Amaramoorthy	INC	60,089	45.36	M. Ravichandran	ADMK	55,895	42.19	4,194	3.17
Perambalur	163	Andimadam	S. S. Sivasankar	DMK	51,395	45.29	K. Pannerselvam	ADMK	45,567	40.16	5,828	5.13
Perambalur	164	Jayankondam	K. Rajendran	ADMK	61,999	45.91	J. Guru	PMK	59,948	44.39	2,051	1.52
Tiruchirapalli	165	Srirangam	M. Paranjothi	ADMK	89,135	45.98	G. Jerome Arokiaraj	INC	78,213	40.34	10,922	5.64
Tiruchirapalli	166	Tiruchirapalli-I	Anbil Periyasamy	DMK	42,886	49.40	A. Malarmannan	MDMK	32,435	37.36	10,451	12.04
Tiruchirapalli	167	Tiruchirapalli-II	K. N. Nehru	DMK	74,026	49.37	M. Mariam Pichai	ADMK	57,394	38.28	16,632	11.09
Tiruchirapalli	168	Thiruverambur	K. N. Sekaran	DMK	95,687	50.42	Sridhar Vandayar	ADMK	70,925	37.37	24,762	13.05
Nagapattinam	169	Sirkali (SC)	M. Panneerselvam	DMK	58,609	47.33	P. Durairajan	VCK	54,818	44.27	3,791	3.06
Nagapattinam	170	Poompuhar	K. Periyasamy	PMK	55,375	46.14	S. Pavunraj	ADMK	54,411	45.33	964	0.81
Nagapattinam	171	Mayuram	S. Rajakumar	INC	53,490	46.26	M. Mahalingam	MDMK	51,912	44.90	1,578	1.36
Nagapattinam	172	Kuttalam	K. Anbazhagan	DMK	66,841	51.76	S. Rajendran	ADMK	55,236	42.77	11,605	8.99
Tiruvarur	173	Nannilam (SC)	P. Padmavathy	CPI	65,614	51.45	K. Arivanandam	ADMK	54,048	42.38	11,566	9.07
Tiruvarur	174	Tiruvarur (SC)	U. Mathivanan	DMK	76,901	56.76	A. Thangamani	ADMK	49,968	36.88	26,933	19.88
Nagapattinam	175	Nagapattinam	V. Marimuthu	CPI(M)	57,315	45.83	K. A. Jayapal	ADMK	54,971	43.95	2,344	1.88
Nagapattinam	176	Vedaranyam	S. K. Vedarathinam	DMK	66,401	49.93	O. S. Manian	ADMK	59,870	45.02	6,531	4.91
Tiruvarur	177	Tiruthuraipundi (SC)	K. Ulaganathan	CPI	75,371	54.67	A. Umadevi	ADMK	52,665	38.20	22,706	16.47
Tiruvarur	178	Mannargudi	V. Sivapunniam	CPI	68,144	49.41	R. Kamaraj	ADMK	61,186	44.37	6,958	5.04
Thanjavur	179	Pattukkottai	N. R. Rengarajan	INC	58,776	46.67	S. Viswanathan	MDMK	43,442	34.50	15,334	12.17
Thanjavur	180	Peravurani	M. V. R. Veerakapilan	ADMK	54,183	41.74	S. V. Sambandam	INC	50,577	38.97	3,606	2.77
Thanjavur	181	Orathanad	R. Vaithilingam	ADMK	61,595	47.99	P. Rajamanickam	DMK	57,752	45.00	3,843	2.99
Thanjavur	182	Thiruvonam	T. Mahesh Krishnasamy	DMK	69,235	46.31	K. Thangamuthu	ADMK	67,430	45.11	1,805	1.20
Thanjavur	183	Thanjavur	S. N. M. Ubayadullah	DMK	61,658	50.40	M. Rengasamy	ADMK	50,412	41.21	11,246	9.19
Thanjavur	184	Tiruvaiyaru	Durai Chandrasekaran	DMK	52,723	46.01	Durai Govindarajan	ADMK	52,357	45.69	366	0.32
Thanjavur	185	Papanasam	R. Doraikkannu	ADMK	60,027	48.88	M. Ramkumar	INC	53,026	43.18	7,001	5.70
Tiruvarur	186	Valangiman (SC)	Ilamathi Subramanian	ADMK	51,939	47.28	S. Senthamil Chelvan	DMK	50,306	45.80	1,633	1.48
Thanjavur	187	Kumbakonam	Ko. Si. Mani	DMK	65,305	52.48	Rama Ramanathan	ADMK	51,164	41.11	14,141	11.37
Thanjavur	188	Thiruvidamarudur	R. K. Bharathi Mohan	ADMK	63,231	47.12	G. Alayamani	PMK	59,463	44.31	3,768	2.81
Pudukottai	189	Tirumayam	R. M. Subburam	INC	47,358	40.30	M. Radhakrishnan	ADMK	47,044	40.04	314	0.26
Pudukottai	190	Kolathur (SC)	N. Subramanian	ADMK	68,735	46.51	C. Paranjothi	DMK	62,467	42.27	6,268	4.24
Pudukottai	191	Pudukkottai	R. Nedunchezhiyan	ADMK	64,319	42.51	M. Jaffarali	DMK	62,369	41.22	1,950	1.29
Pudukottai	192	Alangudi	S. Rajasekaran	CPI	60,122	39.47	A. Venkatachalam	ADMK	50,971	33.47	9,151	6.00
Pudukottai	193	Arantangi	Udayam Shanmugam	DMK	63,333	43.99	Y. Karthikeyan	ADMK	45,873	31.86	17,460	12.13
Sivaganga	194	Tiruppattur	K. R. Periyakaruppan	DMK	48,128	44.99	K. K. Umadhevan	ADMK	42,501	39.73	5,627	5.26
Sivaganga	195	Karaikudi	N. Sundaram	INC	64,013	48.91	O. L. Venkatachalam	ADMK	47,767	36.50	16,246	12.41
Sivaganga	196	Tiruvadanai	K. R. Ramasamy	INC	55,198	47.11	C. Animuthu	ADMK	49,945	42.63	5,253	4.48
Sivaganga	197	Ilayangudi	R. S. Rajakannappan	DMK	50,952	52.48	K. Ayyachamy	ADMK	38,246	39.39	12,706	13.09
Sivaganga	198	Sivaganga	S. Gunasekaran	CPI	39,488	34.34	S. Sevanthiappan	MDMK	33,375	29.03	6,113	5.31
Sivaganga	199	Manamadurai (SC)	M. Gunasekaran	ADMK	53,492	49.04	K. Paramalai	INC	42,037	38.54	11,455	10.50
Ramanathapuram	200	Paramakudi (SC)	R. Ramprabhu	INC	51,075	45.63	S. Sundararaj	ADMK	50,021	44.69	1,054	0.94
Ramanathapuram	201	Ramanathapuram	K. Hussan Ali	INC	66,922	46.63	M. Palanichamy	MDMK	53,555	37.32	13,367	9.31
Ramanathapuram	202	Kadaladi	Suba Thangavelan	DMK	53,600	45.01	V. Sathiamoorthy	ADMK	46,044	38.67	7,556	6.34
Ramanathapuram	203	Mudukulathur	K. Murugavel	DMK	51,555	50.08	S. P. Kalimuthu	ADMK	41,034	39.86	10,521	10.22
Virudunagar	204	Aruppukottai	Thangam Thennarasu	DMK	52,002	44.98	K. Murugan	ADMK	43,768	37.86	8,234	7.12
Virudunagar	205	Sattur	S. Ramachandran	DMK	73,918	49.84	G. Chockeswaran	ADMK	53,073	35.78	20,845	14.06
Virudunagar	206	Virudhunagar	R. Varadarajan	MDMK	50,629	38.95	S. Damodaran	INC	46,522	35.79	4,107	3.16
Virudunagar	207	Sivakasi	R. Gnanadoss	MDMK	79,992	43.77	V. Thangaraj	DMK	70,721	38.70	9,271	5.07
Virudunagar	208	Srivilliputhur	T. Ramasamy	CPI	55,473	41.05	R. Vinayagamoorthy	ADMK	48,857	36.15	6,616	4.90
Virudunagar	209	Rajapalayam (SC)	M. Chandra	ADMK	58,320	39.56	V. P. Rajan	DMK	57,827	39.23	493	0.33
Thoothukudi	210	Vilathikulam	P. Chinnappan	ADMK	45,409	46.89	K. Rajaram	DMK	37,755	38.99	7,654	7.90
Thoothukudi	211	Ottapidaram (SC)	P. Mohan	ADMK	38,715	39.42	K. Krishnasamy	BSP	29,271	29.80	9,444	9.62
Thoothukudi	212	Koilpatti	L. Radhakrishnan	ADMK	53,354	46.88	S. Rajendran	CPI	41,015	36.04	12,339	10.84
Tirunelveli	213	Sankarankovil (SC)	C. Karuppasamy	ADMK	50,603	40.49	S. Thangavelu	DMK	46,161	36.94	4,442	3.55
Tirunelveli	214	Vasudevanallur (SC)	T. S. Tirumalaikumar	MDMK	45,790	40.49	R. Krishnan	CPI(M)	39,031	34.51	6,759	5.98
Tirunelveli	215	Kadayanallur	S. Peter Alphonse	INC	53,700	44.71	U. H. Kamaludeen	ADMK	49,386	41.12	4,314	3.59
Tirunelveli	216	Tenkasi	V. K. Pandian	DMK	69,755	50.23	Rama Udayasuriyan	MDMK	51,097	36.79	18,658	13.44
Tirunelveli	217	Alangulam	Poongothai Aladi Aruna	DMK	62,299	46.20	M. Pandiaraj	ADMK	55,454	41.13	6,845	5.07
Tirunelveli	218	Tirunelveli	N. Malai Raja	DMK	65,517	45.99	Nainar Nagendran	ADMK	64,911	45.56	606	0.43
Tirunelveli	219	Palayamcottai	T. P. M. Mohideen Khan	DMK	85,114	57.53	K. M. Nijamudeen	ADMK	43,815	29.62	41,299	27.91
Tirunelveli	220	Cheranmahadevi	P. Veldurai	INC	48,527	43.91	Paul Manoj Pandian	ADMK	42,495	38.45	6,032	5.46
Tirunelveli	221	Ambasamudram	R. Avudaiyappan	DMK	49,345	45.86	R. Murugaiah Pandian	ADMK	33,614	31.24	15,731	14.62
Tirunelveli	222	Nanguneri	H. Vasanthakumar	INC	54,170	51.93	S. P. Sooriyakumar	ADMK	34,095	32.68	20,075	19.25
Tirunelveli	223	Radhapuram	M. Appavu	DMK	49,249	43.61	L. Gnanapunitha	ADMK	38,552	34.13	10,697	9.48
Thoothukudi	224	Sattangulam	Rani Venkatesan	INC	45,446	52.55	P. Nazareth Durai	MDMK	29,938	34.62	15,508	17.93
Thoothukudi	225	Tiruchendur	Anitha R. Radhakrishnan	ADMK	58,600	52.73	A. D. K. Jayaseelan	DMK	44,684	40.21	13,916	12.52
Thoothukudi	226	Srivaikuntam	D. Selvaraj	INC	38,188	40.94	S. P. Shunmuganathan	ADMK	36,556	39.20	1,632	1.74
Thoothukudi	227	Tuticorin	P. Geetha Jeevan	DMK	79,821	50.92	S. Danielraj	ADMK	64,498	41.14	15,323	9.78
Kanniyakumari	228	Kanniyakumari	N. Suresh Rajan	DMK	63,181	50.31	Thalavai Sundaram	ADMK	52,494	41.80	10,687	8.51
Kanniyakumari	229	Nagercoil	A. Rajan	DMK	45,354	38.26	S. Austin	IVP	31,609	26.66	13,745	11.60
Kanniyakumari	230	Colachel	S. Jeyapaul	INC	50,641	47.19	M. R. Gandhi	BJP	29,321	27.32	21,320	19.87
Kanniyakumari	231	Padmanabhapuram	T. Theodre Reginald	DMK	51,612	53.39	K. P. Rajendra Prasad	ADMK	20,546	21.25	31,066	32.14
Kanniyakumari	232	Thiruvattar	R. Leema Rose	CPI(M)	57,162	51.82	G. Sujith Kumar	BJP	29,112	26.39	28,050	25.43
Kanniyakumari	233	Vilavancode	G. John Joseph	CPI(M)	64,532	53.98	F. Franklin	ADMK	19,458	16.28	45,074	37.70
Kanniyakumari	234	Killiyoor	S. John Jacob	INC	51,016	55.51	T. Chandra Kumar	BJP	24,411	26.56	26,605	28.95

== Strike Rate ==
Strike rate is determined by calculating the number of seats won by a party of the number of seats it contested.

Alliance/ Party		Seats contested	Seats Won	Strike Rate
DPA	DMK	132	96	72.72%
DPA	INC	48	34	70.83%
DPA	PMK	31	18	58.06%
DPA	CPI(M)	13	9	69.23%
DPA	CPI	10	6	60.00%
DPA	Total	234	163	69.65%
AIADMK+	AIADMK	188	61	32.44%
AIADMK+	MDMK	35	6	17.14%
AIADMK+	VCK	9	2	22.22%
AIADMK+	Total	234	69	29.48%

== Aftermath ==
M. Karunanidhi sworned as Chief Minister of Tamil Nadu for 5th time. Even DMK had only 96 MLAs and formed government with the outside support of Congress, Left Parties, Pattali Makkal Katchi. Later Viduthalai Chiruthaigal Katchi joined in DPA in September 2006, ahead of Local Body election.

== Bypolls (2006–2011) ==
Date	Constituency	MLA before election	Party before election	Elected MLA	Party after election
11 October 2006	Madurai Central	P. T. R. Palanivel Rajan	Dravida Munnetra Kazhagam	Syed Ghouse Basha	Dravida Munnetra Kazhagam
26 June 2007	Madurai West	S. V. Shanmugam	All India Anna Dravida Munnetra Kazhagam	K. S. K. Rajendran	Indian National Congress
9 January 2009	Thirumangalam	Veera Elavarasu	Marumalarchi Dravida Munnetra Kazhagam	Latha Athiyaman	Dravida Munnetra Kazhagam
18 August 2009	Bargur	M. Thambidurai	All India Anna Dravida Munnetra Kazhagam	K. R. K. Narasimhan	Dravida Munnetra Kazhagam
18 August 2009	Thondamuthur	M. Kannappan	Marumalarchi Dravida Munnetra Kazhagam	M. N. Kandaswamy	Indian National Congress
18 August 2009	Srivaikuntam	D. Selvaraj	Indian National Congress	M. B. Sudalaiyandi	Indian National Congress
18 August 2009	Ilaiyangudi	Raja Kannappan	Dravida Munnetra Kazhagam	Suba. Mathiarasan	Dravida Munnetra Kazhagam
18 August 2009	Cumbam	N. Eramakrishnan	Marumalarchi Dravida Munnetra Kazhagam	N. Eramakrishnan	Dravida Munnetra Kazhagam
19 December 2009	Vandavasi	S. P. Jayaraman	Dravida Munnetra Kazhagam	Kamalakannan	Dravida Munnetra Kazhagam
19 December 2009	Tiruchendur	Anitha R. Radhakrishnan	All India Anna Dravida Munnetra Kazhagam	Anitha R. Radhakrishnan	Dravida Munnetra Kazhagam
27 March 2010	Pennagaram	P. N. Periannan	Dravida Munnetra Kazhagam	P. N. P. Inbasekaran	Dravida Munnetra Kazhagam

== See also ==
- Elections in Tamil Nadu
- Legislature of Tamil Nadu
- Government of Tamil Nadu
