= S. Rajendran =

S. Rajendran may refer to:

- S. Rajendran (AIADMK politician) (1956–2019), Indian politician and Member of Parliament elected from Viluppuram (Lok Sabha constituency) Tamil Nadu
- S. Rajendran (AIADMK politician, Ariyalur), MLA in the period 2016-2021 from Ariyalur
- S. Rajendran (CPI politician) Indian politician and former Member of the Legislative Assembly of Tamil Nadu from Kovilpatti (state assembly constituency)
- S. Rajendran (Keralite politician), Indian politician and former Member of the Legislative Assembly of Kerala
- S. S. Rajendran, Indian actor, director, producer and politician
- S. N. Rajendran
- S. K. Rajendran
