= Tamilmozhi Rajathathan =

Indian politician

Tamilmozhi Rajadattan
- Born: May 3, 1960 (age 66); Ponnur
- Occupation: politician
- Spouse: Rajadattan

Tamilmozhi Rajadattan is an Indian politician and former Member of the Legislative Assembly of Tamil Nadu. She was elected to the Tamil Nadu legislative assembly as an All India Anna Dravida Munnetra Kazhagam candidate from Melmalaiyanur constituency in the 2001 election. She contested and was the runner up in the election to the Tamil Nadu legislative assembly as an All India Anna Dravida Munnetra Kazhagam candidate from Melmalaiyanur constituency in the 2006 election.

== Early life and background ==
She was born in a Tamil Jain family on May 3, 1960 at Ponnur. Her husband's name is A. Rajathathan.

== Political career ==
She has held the position of a councillor in Melmalayanur Panchayat Union. She is also an executive committee member of AIADMK and the secretary of the Villupuram North District Women's Wing. She has been elected to the Tamil Nadu legislative assembly from Melmalaiyanur constituency as an All India Anna Dravida Munnetra Kazhagam candidate, once in 2001
