= S. P. Jayaraman =

Indian politician

S. P. Jayaraman was an Indian politician and former Member of the Legislative Assembly of Tamil Nadu.

== Political career ==
He was elected to the Tamil Nadu legislative assembly from Vandavasi constituency as a Dravida Munnetra Kazhagam candidate in 2006 election.

== Personal life ==
He was born in Chengadu village near Cheyyar. He died of cancer on 2 November 2009 in Adyar Cancer Institute after one-year battle with cancer. He was 56 and survived by his wife, four sons and a daughter.
