= A. Gnanasekar =

Indian politician

A. Gnanasekar was elected to the Tamil Nadu Legislative Assembly from the Melmalayanur constituency in the 1996 elections. He was a candidate of the Dravida Munnetra Kazhagam (DMK) party.
