= P. Senthamizhselvan =

Indian politician

P. Senthamizhselvan is an Indian politician and a former Member of the Legislative Assembly (MLA) of Tamil Nadu. He hails from Kalathampatti village in Villupuram district. Senthamizhselvan, who held a Bachelor of Science degree, completed his Master of Arts in History at Annamalai University, Chidambaram, in 1995.

A member of the Pattali Makkal Katchi (PMK) party, he contested and won the 2006 Tamil Nadu Legislative Assembly election from the Melmalayanur constituency, thus becoming an MLA.
