= P. Padmavathy =

Indian politician (born 1954)

Member-Tamil Nadu Legislative Assembly
- In office 2006–2011
- Preceded by: C. K. Thamizharasan
- Succeeded by: R. Kamaraj
- Constituency: Nannilam

Personal details
- Born: 19 December 1954 Kalappal
- Party: Communist Party of India
- Profession: Farmer

P. Padmavathy is an Indian politician and a former member of the Tamil Nadu Legislative Assembly. She is from Melanalanallur village in Thiruvarur district. Padmavathy, who has completed her school education at Thiruvarur, belongs to the Communist Party of India (CPI). In the 2006 Tamil Nadu Legislative Assembly election, she contested and won the Nannilam Assembly constituency, becoming a Member of the Legislative Assembly (MLA).

== Electoral Performance ==
=== 2006 ===
2006 Tamil Nadu Legislative Assembly election: Nannilam
Party	Candidate	Votes	%	±%
CPI	P. Padmavathy	65,614	51.46%	New
AIADMK	K. Arivanandam	54,048	42.39%	New
DMDK	R. Rajendran	4,989	3.91%	New
Independent	S. Rajendran	1,483	1.16%	New
BJP	R. Sooriyamoorthy	1,377	1.08%	New
Margin of victory		11,566	9.07%	−7.82%
Turnout		127,511	76.51%	10.00%
Registered electors		166,654		
CPI gain from TMC(M)		Swing	5.35%	
