= P. Prabavathi =

Indian politician

P. Prabavathi was elected to the Tamil Nadu Legislative Assembly from the Dharapuram constituency in the 2006 election. He was a candidate of the Dravida Munnetra Kazhagam (DMK) party.
