= Bharatiya Khet Mazdoor Union =

Agricultural trade union in India

BKMU
- Bharatiya Khet Mazdoor Union
- भारतीय खेत मजदुर युनियन
- Founded: 29 September 1968 (57 years ago), at Moga, Punjab
- Headquarters: New Delhi, India
- Location: India
- Key people: Gulzar Singh Goria (General Secretary); N. Periyasamy (President)
- Affiliations: All India Trade Union Congress

Bharatiya Khet Mazdoor Union which translates to 'Indian Land Workers Union' is a trade union of agricultural labourers in India. BKMU is politically tied to the Communist Party of India (CPI). BKMU is independent from both the main trade union central of CPI, the All India Trade Union Congress, as well as the farmers' organisation of CPI, the All India Kisan Sabha.

Around 5% of agricultural labourers in India are union affiliated. BKMU is one of the major unions working amongst them. The main areas of influence of BKMU are Kerala (where its state unit is known as 'Kerala State Karshaka Thozhilali Federation'), Punjab, Bihar, West Bengal, Tamil Nadu, Andhra Pradesh (where its state unit is known as 'Andhra Pradesh Vyavasaya Karmika Sangham'), Madhya Pradesh and Uttar Pradesh.

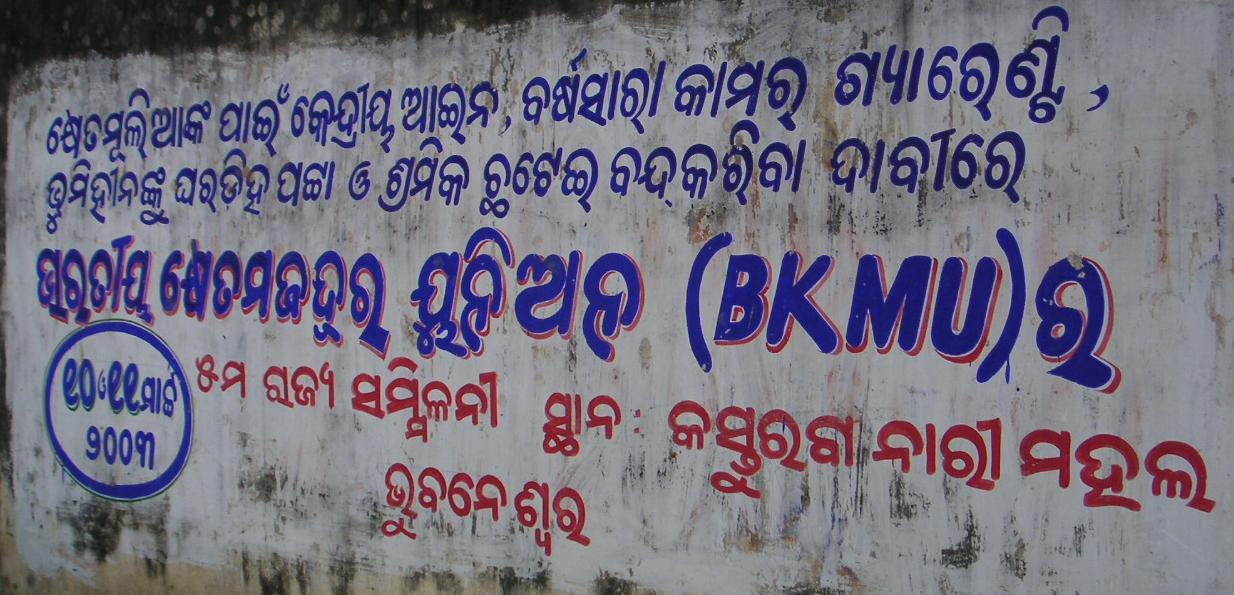
BKMU mural in Bhubaneswar

The 18th congress of CPI in Thiruvananthapuram 2002 decided to put priority to the reactivation of BKMU, and strengthen the influence of the party in rural areas. The report presented to the 19th congress of CPI in Chandigarh 2005 noted that some improvement had occurred, but that work was still to be done to build BKMU. The report cited lack of whole-timers working with BKMU.

BKMU demands government schemes for ensuring employments to agricultural labourers. In Andhra Pradesh, BKMU has joined hands with AIAWU, the rural labour wing of the Communist Party of India (Marxist), in occupying lands belonging to large landlords and distributing it to poor peasants.

The general secretary of BKMU is Rajya Sabha MP Nagendranath Ojha. The national president of BKMU and Lok Sabha MP from Punjab Bhan Singh Bhaura, died on 3 January 2004.
