= L. P. Dharmalingam =

Indian politician

L. P. Dharmalingam was elected to the Tamil Nadu Legislative Assembly from the Sathyamangalam constituency in the 2006 elections. He was a candidate of the Dravida Munnetra Kazhagam (DMK) party.
