= Melmalayanur Assembly constituency =

One of the 234 State Legislative Assembly Constituencies in Tamil Nadu, in India

Coordinates: 12.34°N 79.33°E

Melmalayanur
- Former constituency for the Tamil Nadu Legislative Assembly

Constituency details
- Country: India
- Region: South India
- State: Tamil Nadu
- District: Villupuram
- Lok Sabha constituency: Villupuram
- Established: 1967
- Abolished: 2008
- Total electors: 1,74,724

Melmalayanur is a state assembly constituency in Viluppuram district in Tamil Nadu. Elections and winners in the constituency are listed below. Elections were not held in the years 1957 and 1962. It is one of the 234 State Legislative Assembly Constituencies in Tamil Nadu in India.

== Members of the Legislative Assembly ==
Year	Winner	Party
1952	V. Gopala Gounder	Tamil Nadu Toilers Party
1967	R. R. Munusamy	Dravida Munnetra Kazhagam
1971	R. R. Munusamy	Dravida Munnetra Kazhagam
1977	P. Thangavelu Gounder	All India Anna Dravida Munnetra Kazhagam
1980	A. Chinnadurai	All India Anna Dravida Munnetra Kazhagam
1984	P. U. Shanmugam	All India Anna Dravida Munnetra Kazhagam
1989	R. Panchatcharam	Dravida Munnetra Kazhagam
1991	G. Janakiraman	Indian National Congress
1996	A. Gnanasekar	Dravida Munnetra Kazhagam
2001	Tamilmozhi Rajadattan	All India Anna Dravida Munnetra Kazhagam
2006	P. Senthamizhselvan	Pattali Makkal Katchi

== Election results ==
=== 2006 ===
2006 Tamil Nadu Legislative Assembly election: Melmalayanur
Party	Candidate	Votes	%	±%
PMK	P. Senthamizh Selvan	56,758	45.81%	
AIADMK	R. Tamilmozhi Rajadathan	45,457	36.69%	−14.33%
DMDK	C. Chandira Dass	15,265	12.32%	
Independent	S. Mariyappan	1,850	1.49%	
Independent	M. Anthony Mary	973	0.79%	
Independent	S. R. Manimaran	743	0.60%	
BSP	T. Duraikkannu	721	0.58%	
BJP	B. Bhaskaran	698	0.56%	
Independent	M. Kannan	676	0.55%	
SP	C. Chandrasekaran	325	0.26%	
Independent	R. Thangavelu	245	0.20%	
Margin of victory		11,301	9.12%	−13.56%
Turnout		123,907	70.92%	7.03%
Registered electors		174,724		
PMK gain from AIADMK		Swing	-5.21%	

=== 2001 ===
2001 Tamil Nadu Legislative Assembly election: Melmalayanur
Party	Candidate	Votes	%	±%
AIADMK	R. Tamilmozhi	55,309	51.02%	
DMK	Dr. A. Gnanasekaran	30,722	28.34%	−17.34%
MDMK	A. K. Mani	17,462	16.11%	6.73%
Independent	A. Thenmozhi	2,206	2.03%	
Independent	G. Gnanasekar	1,166	1.08%	
MNK(PLP)	P. Jayaraman	651	0.60%	
Independent	S. Krishanamurthy	522	0.48%	
Independent	D. Ayyasamy Gounder	375	0.35%	
Margin of victory		24,587	22.68%	−2.82%
Turnout		108,413	63.89%	−5.51%
Registered electors		169,696		
AIADMK gain from DMK		Swing	5.34%	

=== 1996 ===
1996 Tamil Nadu Legislative Assembly election: Melmalayanur
Party	Candidate	Votes	%	±%
DMK	A. Gnanasekar	50,905	45.68%	17.40%
INC	Dharmarasan	22,491	20.18%	−32.77%
PMK	A. Murthi	21,634	19.41%	
MDMK	R. Panchatcharan	10,451	9.38%	
Independent	E. Karunanidhi	1,206	1.08%	
Independent	P. Thangavol	1,158	1.04%	
Independent	K. Subramania Gounder	1,004	0.90%	
Independent	N. Sankar	389	0.35%	
JP	S. Maninaran	379	0.34%	
Independent	G. Ravichandran	369	0.33%	
Independent	M. A. Koothan	353	0.32%	
Margin of victory		28,414	25.50%	0.83%
Turnout		111,439	69.40%	0.49%
Registered electors		169,264		
DMK gain from INC		Swing	-7.27%	

=== 1991 ===
1991 Tamil Nadu Legislative Assembly election: Melmalayanur
Party	Candidate	Votes	%	±%
INC	G. Janakiramam	56,864	52.95%	47.98%
DMK	R. Panchatcharam	30,372	28.28%	−18.37%
PMK	G. Anbalagan	18,029	16.79%	
Independent	A. Balasundaram	1,069	1.00%	
Independent	P. Arumugam	663	0.62%	
THMM	S. Annadurai	387	0.36%	
Margin of victory		26,492	24.67%	11.88%
Turnout		107,384	68.91%	−3.37%
Registered electors		160,282		
INC gain from DMK		Swing	6.30%	

=== 1989 ===
1989 Tamil Nadu Legislative Assembly election: Melmalayanur
Party	Candidate	Votes	%	±%
DMK	R. Panchatcharam	46,653	46.66%	16.49%
AIADMK	P. U. Shanmugam	33,866	33.87%	−33.76%
AIADMK	V. Elumalai	11,607	11.61%	−56.02%
INC	S. Rajadurai	4,975	4.98%	
Independent	R. Gurusami	940	0.94%	
Independent	M. A. Koothan	711	0.71%	
Independent	Chandrasekaran	503	0.50%	
Independent	R. Pachaippan	475	0.48%	
Independent	R. Elumalai	182	0.18%	
Independent	H. Kothandam	82	0.08%	
Margin of victory		12,787	12.79%	−24.67%
Turnout		99,994	72.28%	−3.54%
Registered electors		141,778		
DMK gain from AIADMK		Swing	-20.97%	

=== 1984 ===
1984 Tamil Nadu Legislative Assembly election: Melmalayanur
Party	Candidate	Votes	%	±%
AIADMK	P. U. Shanmugam	61,289	67.63%	18.79%
DMK	P. R. Aranganathan	27,343	30.17%	
Independent	S. James	793	0.87%	
Independent	H. Kothandam	415	0.46%	
Independent	A. Chinnadurai	412	0.45%	
Independent	P. Jayaraman	377	0.42%	
Margin of victory		33,946	37.46%	37.21%
Turnout		90,629	75.81%	6.67%
Registered electors		126,800		
AIADMK hold		Swing	18.79%	

=== 1980 ===
1980 Tamil Nadu Legislative Assembly election: Melmalayanur
Party	Candidate	Votes	%	±%
AIADMK	A. Chinnadurai	39,572	48.84%	9.91%
INC	V. Perumal Nainar	39,374	48.59%	
RPI	T. S. Rathinaswamy	1,750	2.16%	
Independent	H. Kothandam	331	0.41%	
Margin of victory		198	0.24%	−18.83%
Turnout		81,027	69.14%	4.66%
Registered electors		118,992		
AIADMK hold		Swing	9.91%	

=== 1977 ===
1977 Tamil Nadu Legislative Assembly election: Melmalayanur
Party	Candidate	Votes	%	±%
AIADMK	P. Thangavelu Gounder	27,673	38.93%	
DMK	S. Vijayaraghavan	14,110	19.85%	−33.70%
Independent	K. Gopala Gounder	12,064	16.97%	
JP	N. V. Ayyakannnu Gounder	6,543	9.20%	
Independent	M. A. Kuthan	5,327	7.49%	
CPI	R. Murugesan	1,828	2.57%	
Independent	A. Sadagopan	1,755	2.47%	
Independent	H. Kothandam	988	1.39%	
Independent	N. Vinayagam	804	1.13%	
Margin of victory		13,563	19.08%	3.84%
Turnout		71,092	64.48%	−4.57%
Registered electors		112,185		
AIADMK gain from DMK		Swing	-14.62%	

=== 1971 ===
1971 Tamil Nadu Legislative Assembly election: Melmalayanur
Party	Candidate	Votes	%	±%
DMK	R. R. Munusamy	31,166	53.54%	2.86%
INC	K. Gopal Gounder	22,294	38.30%	11.83%
Independent	P. Thangavel Kander	3,745	6.43%	
Independent	M. A. Kuthan	1,002	1.72%	
Margin of victory		8,872	15.24%	−8.97%
Turnout		58,207	69.05%	−5.27%
Registered electors		94,704		
DMK hold		Swing	2.86%	

=== 1967 ===
1967 Madras Legislative Assembly election: Melmalayanur
Party	Candidate	Votes	%	±%
DMK	R. R. Munusamy	33,115	50.68%	
INC	K. G. Gounder	17,295	26.47%	
Independent	K. Aranganathan	11,756	17.99%	
Independent	M. A. Kuthan	2,051	3.14%	
Independent	A. Anthonisamy	1,120	1.71%	
Margin of victory		15,820	24.21%	
Turnout		65,337	74.32%	
Registered electors		92,089		
DMK win (new seat)				
