= K. Gopal Kounder =

Indian politician

K. Gopal Kounder was an Indian politician and former Member of the Legislative Assembly of Tamil Nadu. He was elected to the Tamil Nadu legislative assembly as an Independent candidate from Sathyamangalam constituency in 1957 election and as an Indian National Congress candidate in 1962 election.
