= Sathyamangalam Assembly constituency =

Former constituency in Tamil Nadu, India

Coordinates: 11.50°N 77.24°E

Sathiyamangalam
- Former constituency for the Tamil Nadu Legislative Assembly

Constituency details
- Country: India
- Region: South India
- State: Tamil Nadu
- District: Erode
- Lok Sabha constituency: Gobichettipalayam
- Established: 1957
- Abolished: 2008
- Total electors: 171,378
- Reservation: None

Sathyamangalam was a state assembly constituency in Tamil Nadu. Elections and winners in the constituency are listed below. The constituency was in existence from 1957 to the 2008 delimitation, after which it was merged with Bhavanisagar Assembly constituency.

== Members of the Legislative Assembly ==
Year	Winner	Party
Madras State
1957	K. Gopal Gounder	Independent
1962	Gopal Gounder	Indian National Congress
1967	P. G. Karuthiruman	Indian National Congress
Tamil Nadu
1971	S. K. Subramaniam	Dravida Munnetra Kazhagam
1977	K. A. Sengottaiyan	All India Anna Dravida Munnetra Kazhagam
1980	R. Rangasamy	All India Anna Dravida Munnetra Kazhagam
1984	E. V. K. S. Elangovan	Indian National Congress
1989	T. K. Subramaniam	Dravida Munnetra Kazhagam
1991	A. T. Saraswathi	All India Anna Dravida Munnetra Kazhagam
1996	S. K. Rajendran	Dravida Munnetra Kazhagam
2001	K. R. Kandasamy	All India Anna Dravida Munnetra Kazhagam
2006	L. P. Dharmalingam	Dravida Munnetra Kazhagam

== Election results ==
Vote share of winning candidates
2006	46.13%
2001	52.21%
1996	48.65%
1991	67.21%
1989	31.66%
1984	62.97%
1980	50.04%
1977	35.81%
1971	55.60%
1967	49.22%
1962	59.63%
1957	59.40%

=== 2006 ===
2006 Tamil Nadu Legislative Assembly election: Sathyamangalam
Party	Candidate	Votes	%	±%
DMK	L. P. Dharmalingam	56,035	46.13	26.10
MDMK	T. K. Subramaniam	40,141	33.05	17.18
DMDK	D. Manoharan	15,596	12.84	
BJP	S. N. R. Sivakumar	3,711	3.06	
Independent	N. S. Ramalingan	2,112	1.74	
SP	R. Palanisamy	1,775	1.46	
Independent	K. Selvan	1,124	0.93	
Independent	B. Gopal	971	0.80	
Margin of victory		15,894	13.09	−19.09
Turnout		121,465	70.88	11.23
Registered electors		171,378		
DMK gain from AIADMK		Swing	-6.08	

=== 2001 ===
2001 Tamil Nadu Legislative Assembly election: Sathyamangalam
Party	Candidate	Votes	%	±%
AIADMK	K. R. Kandasamy	54,252	52.21	11.96
DMK	S. K. Rajendran	20,818	20.04	−28.62
MDMK	T. K. Subramaniam	16,486	15.87	
Independent	D. Sivanna	10,947	10.54	
Independent	R. Sakthivel	1,400	1.35	
Margin of victory		33,434	32.18	23.78
Turnout		103,903	59.65	−9.68
Registered electors		174,264		
AIADMK gain from DMK		Swing	3.56	

=== 1996 ===
1996 Tamil Nadu Legislative Assembly election: Sathyamangalam
Party	Candidate	Votes	%	±%
DMK	S. K. Rajendran	50,885	48.65	20.39
AIADMK	T. R. Attiannan	42,101	40.25	−26.95
CPI(M)	A. M. Kadar	7,142	6.83	
BJP	M. Subburaju	1,721	1.65	−0.62
Independent	K. M. Chinnakutty	571	0.55	
AIIC(T)	S. M. Subramanian	523	0.50	
Independent	T. C. Krishna	357	0.34	
Independent	S. K. Sellakutty	333	0.32	
Independent	S. Ganesan	322	0.31	
Independent	K. N. Natarajan	260	0.25	
Independent	K. Kamala	234	0.22	
Margin of victory		8,784	8.40	−30.55
Turnout		104,586	69.33	3.80
Registered electors		158,941		
DMK gain from AIADMK		Swing	-18.56	

=== 1991 ===
1991 Tamil Nadu Legislative Assembly election: Sathyamangalam
Party	Candidate	Votes	%	±%
AIADMK	A. T. Saraswathi	63,739	67.21	36.68
DMK	T. K. Subramaniam	26,801	28.26	−3.40
BJP	S. M. Nallasamy	2,146	2.26	
JP	T. V. Karivaradarajan	729	0.77	
PMK	T. Panneerselvam	716	0.75	
THMM	S. M. Mahendran	401	0.42	
Independent	P. Sundrasamy	223	0.24	
Independent	M. S. Sridaran	81	0.09	
Margin of victory		36,938	38.95	37.82
Turnout		94,836	65.53	−8.34
Registered electors		151,431		
AIADMK gain from DMK		Swing	35.55	

=== 1989 ===
1989 Tamil Nadu Legislative Assembly election: Sathyamangalam
Party	Candidate	Votes	%	±%
DMK	T. K. Subramaniam	30,535	31.66	0.62
AIADMK	S. K. Palanisamy	29,448	30.53	
INC	T. Chinnasamy	22,407	23.23	−39.73
AIADMK	R. Rangasmay	12,589	13.05	
Independent	N. Subbaiyan	684	0.71	
Independent	Rasachetti	461	0.48	
Independent	P. Prabakaran	196	0.20	
Independent	K. Longanathan	126	0.13	
Margin of victory		1,087	1.13	−30.80
Turnout		96,446	73.87	0.59
Registered electors		134,394		
DMK gain from INC		Swing	-31.31	

=== 1984 ===
1984 Tamil Nadu Legislative Assembly election: Sathyamangalam
Party	Candidate	Votes	%	±%
INC	E. V. K. S. Elangovan	50,725	62.97	13.01
DMK	T. K. Subramaniam	25,006	31.04	
Independent	K. C. Subramanaiam	1,476	1.83	
Independent	R. Kalanaicker	1,368	1.70	
Independent	V. K. Kaliappa Achari	1,237	1.54	
Independent	B. Muthu	747	0.93	
Margin of victory		25,719	31.93	31.84
Turnout		80,559	73.28	10.08
Registered electors		117,272		
INC gain from AIADMK		Swing	12.92	

=== 1980 ===
1980 Tamil Nadu Legislative Assembly election: Sathyamangalam
Party	Candidate	Votes	%	±%
AIADMK	R. Rangasamy	35,096	50.04	14.23
INC	C. R. Rasappa	35,036	49.96	16.69
Margin of victory		60	0.09	−2.47
Turnout		70,132	63.20	6.11
Registered electors		113,957		
AIADMK hold		Swing	14.23	

=== 1977 ===
1977 Tamil Nadu Legislative Assembly election: Sathyamangalam
Party	Candidate	Votes	%	±%
AIADMK	K. A. Sengottaiyan	21,145	35.81	
INC	C. R. Rajappa	19,639	33.26	−6.66
DMK	T. M. Onna Marannan	10,250	17.36	−38.24
JP	N. N. Nagaraj	7,054	11.95	
Independent	P. Muthirulandi	952	1.61	
Margin of victory		1,506	2.55	−13.13
Turnout		59,040	57.09	−12.50
Registered electors		105,350		
AIADMK gain from DMK		Swing	-19.79	

=== 1971 ===
1971 Tamil Nadu Legislative Assembly election: Sathyamangalam
Party	Candidate	Votes	%	±%
DMK	S. K. Subramaniam	31,873	55.60	
INC	P. G. Karuthiruman	22,887	39.93	−9.30
CPI(M)	S. M. Badran	2,563	4.47	
Margin of victory		8,986	15.68	13.35
Turnout		57,323	69.60	−1.55
Registered electors		86,531		
DMK gain from INC		Swing	6.38	

=== 1967 ===
1967 Madras Legislative Assembly election: Sathyamangalam
Party	Candidate	Votes	%	±%
INC	P. G. Karuthiruman	25,484	49.22	−10.41
CPI(M)	S. M. Marappan	24,278	46.89	
Independent	Rajamanickam	2,011	3.88	
Margin of victory		1,206	2.33	−32.08
Turnout		51,773	71.15	18.77
Registered electors		78,131		
INC hold		Swing	-10.41	

=== 1962 ===
1962 Madras Legislative Assembly election: Sathyamangalam
Party	Candidate	Votes	%	±%
INC	K. Gopal Kounder	23,914	59.63	19.03
Independent	Anthonisamy	10,115	25.22	
SWA	Pachaiyappa Naicker	6,073	15.14	
Margin of victory		13,799	34.41	15.61
Turnout		40,102	52.38	8.01
Registered electors		81,582		
INC gain from Independent		Swing	0.23	

=== 1957 ===
1957 Madras Legislative Assembly election: Sathyamangalam
Party	Candidate	Votes	%	±%
Independent	K. Gopal Gounder	21,298	59.40	
INC	K. Aranganathan	14,558	40.60	
Margin of victory		6,740	18.80	
Turnout		35,856	44.37	
Registered electors		80,814		
Independent win (new seat)				
