= D. Ganesan =

Indian politician

D. Ganesan is an Indian politician and presently serving Member of the Legislative Assembly of Tamil Nadu. He was elected to the Tamil Nadu legislative assembly as an Anna Dravida Munnetra Kazhagam candidate from Theni constituency in 2001 and 2006 elections.
