= S. K. Rajendran =

Indian politician

S. K. Rajendran is an Indian politician and was a Member of the Legislative Assembly of Tamil Nadu. He was elected to the Tamil Nadu legislative assembly as a Dravida Munnetra Kazhagam candidate from Sathyamangalam constituency in the 1996 election.
