= T. K. Subramaniam =

Indian politician

T. K. Subramaniam was elected to the Tamil Nadu Legislative Assembly from the Sathyamangalam constituency in the 1989 elections. He was a candidate of the Dravida Munnetra Kazhagam (DMK) party.
