= N. Periyasamy =

Indian politician

N. Periyasamy is an Indian politician and former Member of the Legislative Assembly of Tamil Nadu. He was elected to the Tamil Nadu legislative assembly as a Communist Party of India candidate from Perundurai constituency in the 1996 election. He is the president of Bharatiya Khet Mazdoor Union.
