= Arunachalam (name) =

Arunachalam அருணாசலம்
- Pronunciation: Aruṇācalam
- Gender: Male
- Language: Tamil

Origin
- Region of origin: Southern India; North-eastern Sri Lanka

Other names
- Alternative spelling: Arunasalam

Arunachalam (Tamil: அருணாசலம், romanized: Aruṇācalam) or Arunachala (Tamil: அருணாசல, romanized: Aruṇācala) is a Tamil male given name. Due to the Tamil tradition of using patronymic surnames it may also be a surname for males and females.

== Notable people ==
=== Given name ===
Arunachalam or Arunasalam

- A. Arunachalam, Indian politician
- Arunachalam Shekhar Dileep Kumar (born 1967), birth name of A. R. Rahman, Indian composer
- M. Arunachalam (born 1949), Hong Kong based businessman
- M. Arunachalam (1944–2004), Indian politician
- P. Arunachalam (1853–1924), Ceylonese civil servant and statesman
- Panchu Arunachalam (1941–2016), Indian writer, director, producer and lyricist
- Pon Arunachalam (born 1946), Indian writer
- R. Arunachalam, Indian politician
- Subbiah Arunachalam (born 1941), Indian information consultant
- Subbu Panchu Arunachalam (born 1969), Indian actor and film producer
- V. Arunachalam (1933–2004), Indian politician, activist, and writer
- V. S. Arunachalam, Indian politician
- V. S. R. Arunachalam, Indian scientist

=== Surname ===
Arunachala

- Arunachala Kavi (1711–1779), Indian poet and a composer
- Arunachala Sreenivasan (1909–1996), Indian nutritional scientist
- Arunachala Thevar, Indian politician
- Lalpet Arunachala Govindaraghava Aiyar (1867–1935), Indian lawyer, theosophist, independence activist and politician

Arunachalam or Arunasalam

- Arunchalam Aravind Kumar (born 1954), Sri Lankan trade unionist and politician
- Arunasalam Kumarathurai (1939–2019), Sri Lankan founder of Kumarapuram
- Arunachalam Mahadeva (1885–1969), Ceylonese lawyer and politician
- Arunasalam Murugadoss (born 1974), Indian film director, producer, and screenwriter
- Arunachalam Muruganantham (born 1962), Indian social entrepreneur
- Arunasalam Namathevan (born 1996), Malaysian footballer
- Arunachalam Ponnambalam (1814–1887), Ceylonese government functionary, businessmen and philanthropist
- Arunachalam Sabapathy (1853–1924), Ceylonese newspaper editor and politician
- Arunasalam Thangathurai (1936–1997), Sri Lankan lawyer and politician
- Jaya Arunachalam (1935–2019), Indian social worker
