= 1977 Tamil Nadu Legislative Assembly election =

Indian election

- 10 June 1977

All 234 seats in the Tamil Nadu Legislative Assembly 118 seats needed for a majority
- Turnout: 61.58% (▼10.52%)
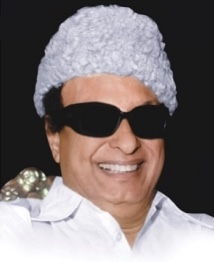

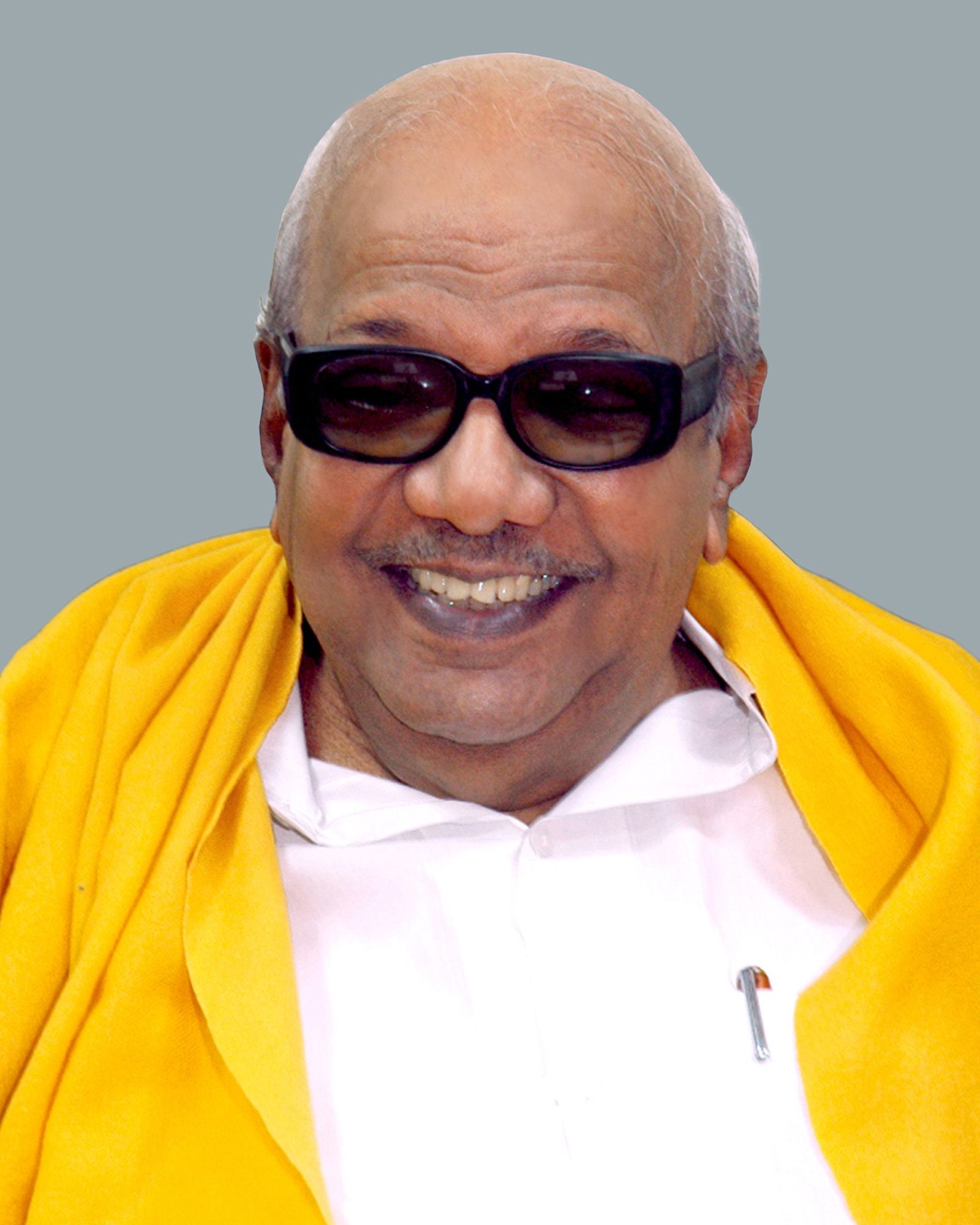
	First party	Second party
Leader	M. G. Ramachandran	M. Karunanidhi
Party	AIADMK	DMK
Alliance	AIADMK+
Leader's seat	Aruppukottai	Anna Nagar
Seats won	130	48
Seat change	New party	▼136
Popular vote	5,194,876	4,258,771
Percentage	30.4%	24.9%
Swing	New party	▼2.8%
Alliance seats	144	48
New party	▲144	▼136
Alliance popular vote	5,734,692	4,258,771
Alliance percentage	33.5%	24.9%
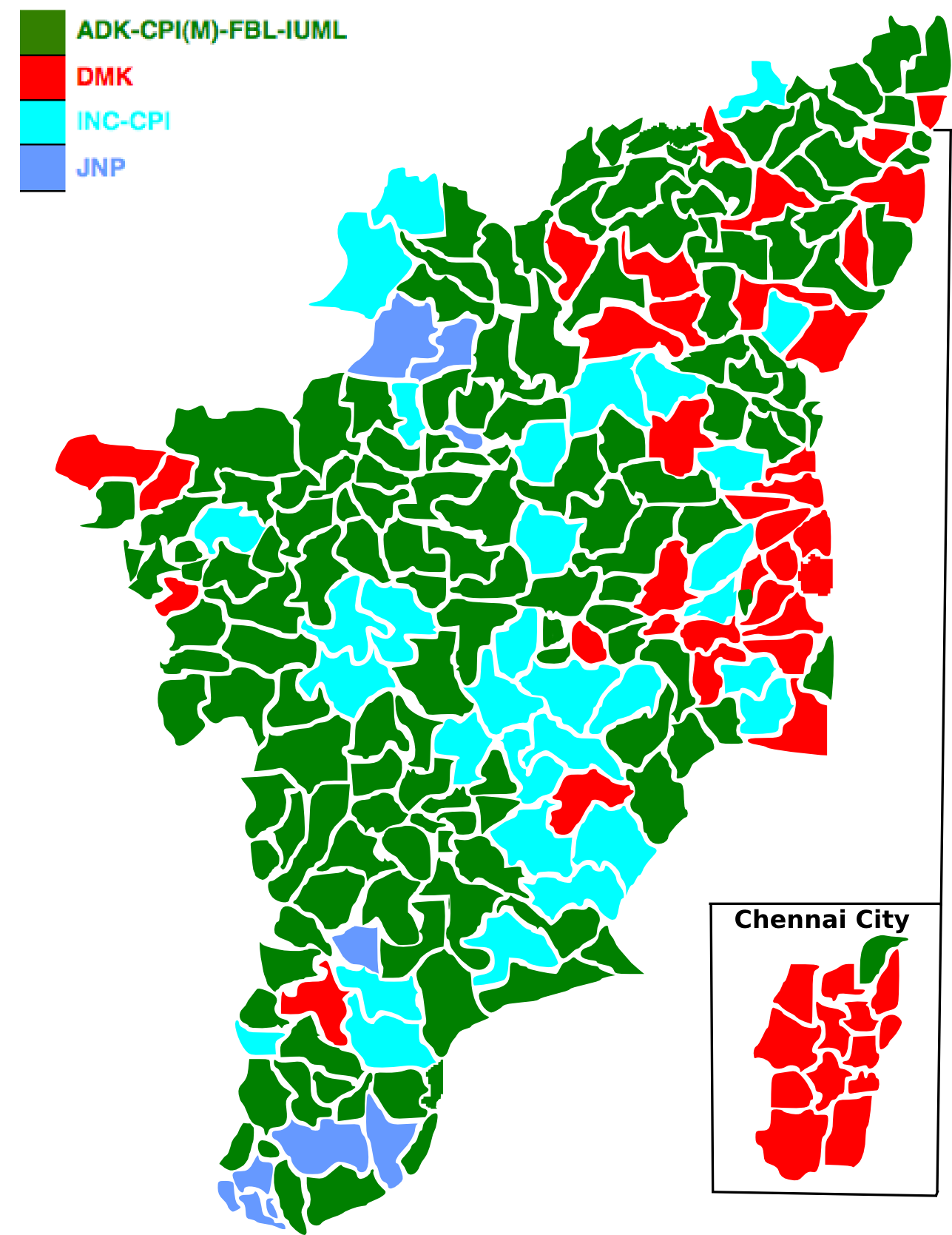
- 1977 election map (by constituencies)

- Alliance wise Result
Chief Minister before election
President's rule
Elected Chief Minister
M. G. Ramachandran
AIADMK

The sixth legislative assembly election of Tamil Nadu was held on 10 June 1977. All India Anna Dravida Munnetra Kazhagam (AIADMK) won the election, defeating its rival Dravida Munnetra Kazhagam (DMK). M. G. Ramachandran (commonly known as M. G. R.), the AIADMK founder and a prominent Tamil film actor, was sworn in as Chief Minister for the first time. The election was a four-cornered contest among the AIADMK, DMK, the Indian National Congress (INC), and the Janata Party.

In 1972, M. G. R. founded the AIADMK after being expelled from the DMK due to differences with DMK leader M. Karunanidhi. On 31 January 1976, Karunanidhi's government was dismissed by the central government under Prime Minister Indira Gandhi, citing non-cooperation under MISA. This led to the imposition of President's rule in the state. Karunanidhi had opposed the Emergency and allied with the Janata Party, founded by Jayaprakash Narayan. M. G. R. served as Chief Minister until his death in 1987, winning re-election in the 1980 and 1984 elections.

M. G. R.'s success set a precedent for actors entering politics, inspiring Telugu superstar N. T. Rama Rao to follow suit in 1982 and win the Andhra Pradesh assembly elections, subsequently becoming the Chief Minister of Andhra Pradesh. A similar election occurred in 2026, with actor C. Joseph Vijay becoming Chief Minister of Tamil Nadu.

== Background ==
=== Split in Dravida Munnetra Kazhagam ===
The DMK gradually weakened in the years following the previous election due to several splits resulting from the exit of influential leaders, including M.G.R. The party's popularity was further undermined by widespread corruption allegations, which M.G.R highlighted, given his close relationship with the Indian National Congress (INC). Tensions within the Dravida Munnetra Kazhagam began to surface before the 1971 election, but were put aside to win the elections in a standing record landslide margin.

K. A. Mathiazhagan was removed from his position as Minister of Finance, as he was seen as a significant threat to Karunanidhi's leadership. In 1972, influential Dalit leader Sathyavani Muthu left the party, citing a lack of concern for Dalit issues, and subsequently formed the Thazhthapattor Munnetra Kazhagam. Treasurer of the party M.G.R was expelled on 10 October 1972 following disciplinary action for his open criticisms of the party leadership regarding alleged corruption and authoritarian behavior. He then joined and lead the All India Anna Dravida Munnetra Kazhagam (AIADMK), which won the Dindigul by-election in 1973.

In March 1977, V. R. Nedunchezhiyan and several senior leaders also left the DMK to form the Makkal Dravida Munnetra Kazhagam.

=== Emergency ===
Emergency, which was declared in June 1975 had a mixed reception in Tamil Nadu. Jayaprakash Narayan's opposition movement did not receive much support in Tamil Nadu due to his association with the DMK government, which had its own trouble due to accusations of corruption. K. Kamaraj did not come in support of Jayaprakash Narayan due to his association with DMK despite the fact he disapproved of Indira Gandhi's actions. DMK executive council called the Emergency unnecessary and undemocratic on 27 June and party leaders condemned it in several statewide meetings. Emergency regulations and censorship were not strictly enforced in Tamil Nadu unlike in other states. All India Anna Dravida Munnetra Kazhagam and Communist Party of India continued to support Indira Gandhi. M. G. Ramachandran even visited Delhi to extend his support to Indira Gandhi. It was under these circumstances Karunanidhi's government was dismissed by the Government of India on 31 January 1976. ADMK (as the AIADMK was known at the time) General Secretary M. G. Ramachandran welcomed the dismissal of the DMK government, describing the Prime Minister Indira’s action as “courageous.” He stated that his party would support the Prime Minister in such measures to safeguard democracy and urged the Union government to appoint a commission of inquiry into the alleged corruption charges.

=== Death of Kamaraj and Rajaji ===
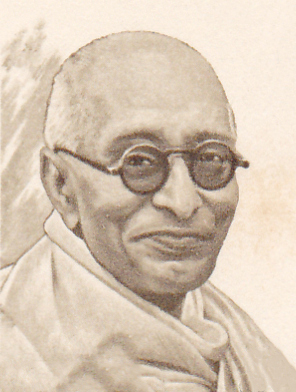
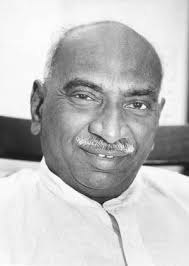
The sixth legislative assembly election was the first election to the body after the deaths of two of the most prominent Chief Ministers and political supremos of erstwhile Madras State, C. Rajagopalachari (pictured left) and K. Kamaraj (right).

Kamaraj, leader of Indian National Congress (Organisation), who remarked in 1972, "Randu Katchigalum Orey Kuttaiyil Oorina Mattaigal (both parties, the DMK and the AIADMK, are like fronds dipped in the same bog or tarred by the same brush)." died in 1975. Indian National Congress (Indira) faction could not establish a foothold in Tamil Nadu until his death. After his death, Indian National Congress (Organisation) lost its identity as a party amid internal turmoil, and a large number of its members led by G. K. Moopanar merged with Indira Congress. The remaining chose not to join with Dravida Munnetra Kazhagam, but rather joined the Janata Party and later remained largely uncommitted. Swatantra Party lost much of its power after the death of C. Rajagopalachari in 1972 and did not contest the election. Most of its members joined the newly formed Janata Party.

=== Coalitions ===
This election was a four cornered contest. The AIADMK allied itself with the Communist Party of India (Marxist), while INC(I) and Communist Party of India (CPI) contested as allies. The DMK and Janata Party (JNP) contested the elections alone. The previously held 1977 Lok sabha election results in march, in which Communist Party of India (Marxist) failed to win a seat, strained its ties with DMK, following which MGR swiftly initiated talks that led to an alliance between the CPI(M) and AIADMK. The AIADMK did not field any candidate in the Usilampatti Constituency in support of the Forward Bloc leader P.K. Mookiah Thevar. Similarly the AIADMK also supported the Indian Union Muslim League (IUML) candidate M. Abdul Latheef in the Vaniyambadi Constituency. In the parliamentary elections that occurred just three months prior to this elections, there had been two major alliances – the AIADMK led AIADMK-INC-CPI coalition and the DMK led DMK-NCO-JNP-CPM coalition. But in the months that followed the parliamentary election, these coalitions fell apart.

During this election, a symbol allotment error in the Dharapuram Assembly constituency resulted in the “Two Leaves” symbol of the AIADMK being allotted by the Election Commission of India to an independent rebel candidate Ayyachamy who had earlier been announced by the party but later withdrawn. Despite an appeal from MGR to support his revised nominee Alangiyam A. K. Balakrishnan contesting under the “Lion” symbol, voters elected the independent candidate, highlighting the symbol’s popularity.

At the last minute, DMK president Karunanidhi announced his willingness to reach an understanding with the Janata Party and the Congress to oppose MGR in Aruppukkottai Assembly constituency by withdrawing his party’s candidate in favour of a winnable nominee, but the arrangement did not materialise, as Janata leader P. Ramachandran declined to comment and Congress state president G. K. Moopanar rejected the proposal.

== Seat allotments ==
=== AIADMK Front ===
AIADMK-led Alliance
Party	Flag	Symbol	Leader	Seats	
All India Anna Dravida Munnetra Kazhagam			M. G. Ramachandran	195	200
Uzhaippalar Munnetra Kazhagam			R. Margabandhu	3	200
Indian National Forward Bloc				2	200
Communist Party of India (Marxist)			A. Balasubramaniam	20	
Indian Union Muslim League (Note: Scales Symbol was Independent Symbol throughout India, except Punjab in 1977 elections.)			A. K. A. Abdul Samad	10 (Note: IUML Contested as independents under AIADMK-led Alliance.)	
All India Forward Bloc			P. K. Mookiah Thevar	1 (Note: Of 6 Candidates of All India Forward Bloc, AIADMK had officially supported only P. K. Mookiah Thevar in Usilampatti)	
Independent			S. P. Adithanar; M. P. Kannusamy	2	
Total				233 (Note: AIADMK had endorsed Janata Party in Killyur)	

=== DMK ===
Dravida Munnetra Kazhagam
Party	Flag	Symbol	Leader	Seats
Dravida Munnetra Kazhagam			M. Karunanidhi	230
Independent			N. Shanmugham	1
Total				231 (Note: Dravida Munnetra Kazhagam had endorsed Janata Party in Vilavancode and Killiyoor, Panruti constituencies.)

=== INC(I) Front ===
Indira Congress-led Alliance
Party	Flag	Symbol	Leader	Seats
Indian National Congress (I)			G. K. Moopanar	198
Communist Party of India			M. Kalyanasundaram	32
Republican Party of India				3
Independent			C. K. Madhavan	1
Total				234

=== JP Front ===
Janata Alliance
Party	Flag	Symbol	Leader	Seats	
Janata Party			P. Ramachandran	226	233
Tamil Nadu Muslim League				3	233
Tamil Nadu Farmers Association				3	233
Republican Party of India (Khobragade)				1	233
Independent			N. A. R. Nagarajan	1	
Total				234	

== Voting and results ==
Polling for the election was held on 10 June 1977. Turnout among the eligible voters was 61.58%.

=== Results by Pre-Poll Alliance ===
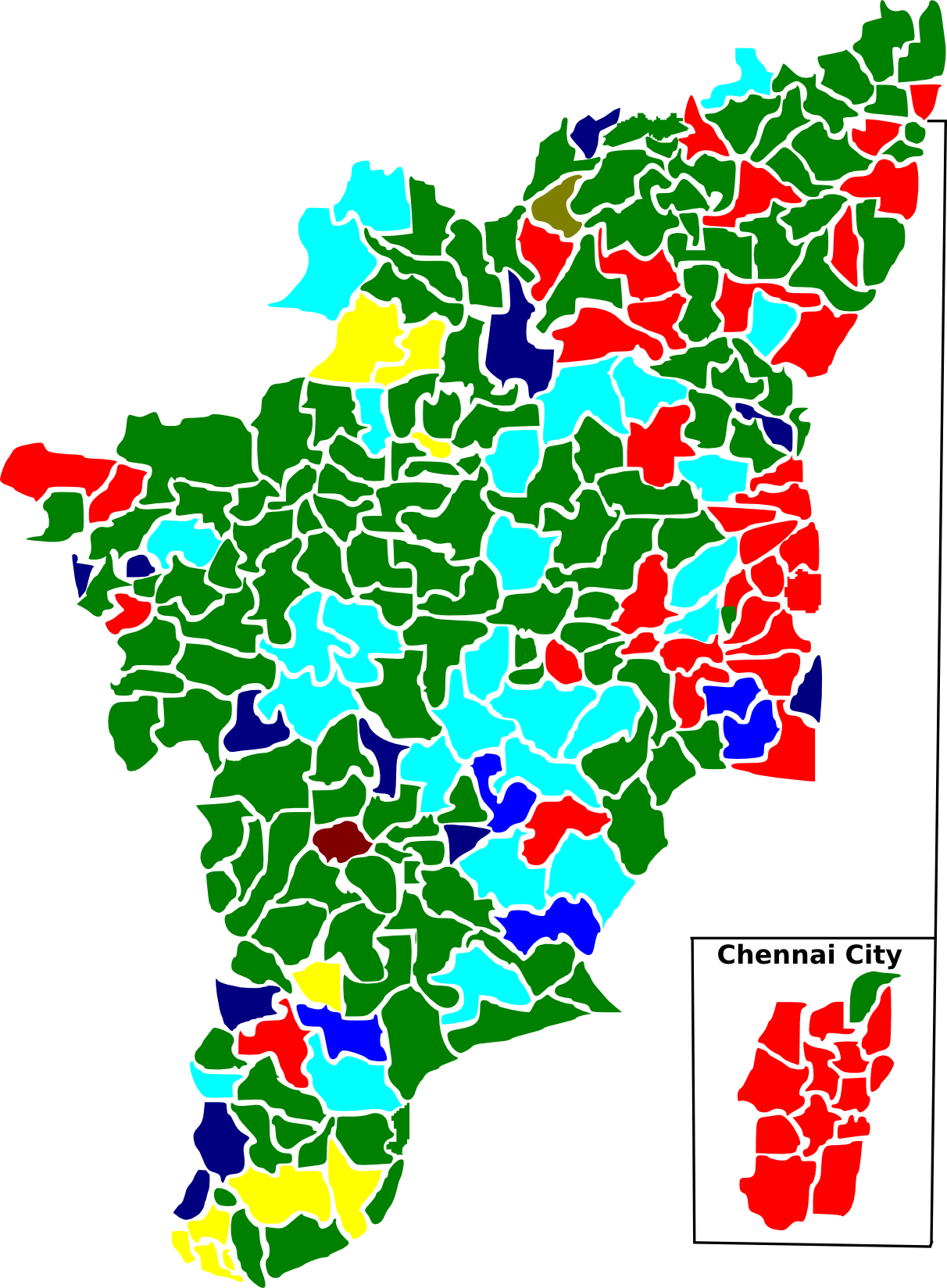
Election map of results based on parties. Colours are based on the results table on the left

Summary of the 1977 June Tamil Nadu Legislative Assembly election results
Alliance/Party	Seats won	Change	Popular Vote	Vote %	Adj. %^{‡}
AIADMK+ alliance	144	+144	5,734,692	33.5%	
AIADMK	130	New	5,194,876	30.4%	35.4%
CPI(M)	12	+12	477,835	2.8%	33.0%
FBL	1	–	35,361	0.2%	62.0%
IND	1	–	26,620	0.2%	42.9%
DMK	48	-136	4,258,771	24.9%	
DMK	48	-136	4,258,771	24.9%	25.3%
Congress alliance	32	+24	3,491,490	20.4%	
INC	27	+27	2,994,535	17.5%	20.8%
CPI	5	-3	496,955	2.9%	20.4%
Janata	10	+10	2,851,884	16.7%	
JNP	10	+10	2,851,884	16.7%	16.8%
Others	0	-8	751,712	4.4%	
IND	0	-8	751,712	4.4%	–
Total	234	–	17,108,146	100%	–

‡: Vote % reflects the percentage of votes the party received compared to the entire electorate that voted in this election. Adjusted (Adj.) Vote %, reflects the % of votes the party received per constituency that they contested.
Sources: Election Commission of India

=== Result Analysis ===
On 14 June 1977, the All India Anna Dravida Munnetra Kazhagam (AIADMK) began leading early and secured victories from the commencement of vote counting. In most constituencies, the Dravida Munnetra Kazhagam (DMK) and the Indian National Congress finished in second and third places respectively, while the ruling Janata Party at the Centre largely trailed in last place. The DMK registered significant victories only in its strongholds Madras city (now Chennai) and the then undivided Thanjavur district. In Madras, the party won 13 constituencies, with the exception of the Radhakrishnan Nagar (R.K. Nagar) seat, where AIADMK candidate and actor Isari Velan defeated Congress's T. N. Anandanayaki. However, the DMK failed to secure a single seat in the districts of Salem, Dharmapuri, Pudukottai, Madurai, Ramanathapuram and Kanyakumari.

=== Results by district ===
District	Seats				
District	Seats	ADK+	DMK+	INC+	JNP
Chengalpattu	17	12	4	1	—N/a
Madras	14	1	13	—N/a	—N/a
North Arcot	21	15	6	—N/a	—N/a
South Arcot	21	11	7	3	—N/a
Dharmapuri	10	6	—N/a	2	2
Salem	17	14	—N/a	2	1
Coimbatore	25	22	1	2	—N/a
Nilgiris	3	1	2	—N/a	—N/a
Tiruchirapalli	18	12	2	4	—N/a
Thanjavur	20	4	12	4	—N/a
Pudukottai	5	1	—N/a	4	—N/a
Ramanathapuram	16	10	—N/a	5	1
Madurai	22	20	—N/a	2	—N/a
Tirunelveli	18	12	1	3	2
Kanyakumari	7	3	—N/a	—N/a	4
Total	234	144	48	32	10

=== By Region ===
Alliance-wise Results
Region	Total Seats	AIADMK-led Alliance	Dravida Munnetra Kazhagam	Congress-CPI Alliance	Janata Party
Northern Tamil Nadu	73	39 / 73 (53%)	30 / 73 (41%)	4 / 73 (5%)	0 / 73 (0%)
Western Tamil Nadu	55	43 / 55 (78%)	3 / 55 (5%)	6 / 55 (11%)	3 / 55 (5%)
Southern TamilNadu	63	45 / 63 (71%)	1 / 63 (2%)	10 / 63 (16%)	7 / 63 (11%)
Central TamilNadu	43	17 / 43 (40%)	14 / 43 (33%)	12 / 43 (28%)	0 / 43 (0%)

=== By constituency ===
Winner, runner-up, voter turnout, and victory margin in every constituency
District	Assembly Constituency		Winner				Runner Up				Margin
District	No.	Name	Candidate	Party	Votes	%	Candidate	Party	Votes	%	Margin
Madras	1	Royapuram	Ponnurangam	DMK	24,217	33.54	M. Raji	AIADMK	22,626	31.34	1,591
Madras	2	Harbour	A. Selvarajan	DMK	23,845	36.71	M. M. Peer Mohammad	Independent	17,862	27.5	5,983
Madras	3	Dr. Radhakrishnan Nagar	Isari Velan	AIADMK	28,416	35.57	R. D. Seethapathy	DMK	26,928	33.71	1,488
Madras	4	Park Town	T.S. Nallathambi	DMK	22,433	32.78	N. G. Bhuvaneshwari	JP	19,207	28.07	3,226
Madras	5	Perambur (SC)	S. Baalan	DMK	34,134	42.74	T. Raja	AIADMK	20,666	25.88	13,468
Madras	6	Purasawalkam	K. Anbazhagan	DMK	41,073	45.09	T. S. Govindaswamy	JP	22,004	24.16	19,069
Madras	7	Egmore (SC)	S.Manimudi	DMK	26,746	38.6	K. Deivasigamoni	AIADMK	19,414	28.02	7,332
Madras	8	Anna Nagar	M. Karunanidhi	DMK	43,076	50.1	G. Krishnamurthy	AIADMK	26,638	30.98	16,438
Madras	9	T. Nagar	R. E. Chandran Jayapal	DMK	23,346	30.91	K. Krishnamoorthy	AIADMK	22,316	29.55	1,030
Madras	10	Thousand lights	S.J. Sadiq Pasha	DMK	26,599	37.13	Syed Khaleefa Thullah	Independent	21,741	30.35	4,858
Madras	11	Chepauk	A. Rahman Khan	DMK	24,425	38.4	V. Rajkumar	AIADMK	17,796	27.98	6,629
Madras	12	Triplicane	M. Aranganathan	DMK	23,154	35.16	Noorjahan Razack	AIADMK	21,027	31.93	2,127
Madras	13	Mylapore	T. K. Kapali	DMK	26,044	33.75	Lakshmi Krishnamurthi	JP	21,138	27.39	4,906
Madras	14	Saidapet	D. Purushothaman	DMK	27,160	36.7	N. Kannan	AIADMK	21,882	29.56	5,278
Chengalpattu	15	Gummidipoondi	S. Munirathinam	AIADMK	32,309	42.26	G. Kamalambujammal	JP	21,042	27.52	11,267
Chengalpattu	16	Ponneri (SC)	S. M. Dorairaj	AIADMK	31,796	42.64	G. Vetriveeran	DMK	20,524	27.53	11,272
Chengalpattu	17	Thiruvottiyur	P. Sigamony	AIADMK	26,458	31.29	M. V. Narayanaswamy	DMK	23,995	28.37	2,463
Chengalpattu	18	Villivakkam	K. Suppu	DMK	37,327	41.07	R. Sarweshwar Rao	AIADMK	29,429	32.38	7,898
Chengalpattu	19	Alandur	K. M. Abdul Razack	AIADMK	30,961	37.45	M. Abiraham	DMK	27,112	32.8	3,849
Chengalpattu	20	Tambaram	Munu Adhi	AIADMK	32,394	35.22	Pammal Nallathambi	DMK	31,968	34.75	426
Chengalpattu	21	Thiruporur (SC)	G. Chokkalingam	DMK	24,932	44.78	T. Radha	AIADMK	22,831	41	2,101
Chengalpattu	22	Chengalpattu	Anoor Jagadeesan	AIADMK	29,306	43.5	V. Rudrakotti	DMK	25,436	37.75	3,870
Chengalpattu	23	Maduranthakam	C. Arumugam	DMK	26,977	36.08	S. D. Ugamchand	INC	19,645	26.27	7,332
Chengalpattu	24	Acharapakkam (SC)	Ethraj	AIADMK	26,756	43.19	N. Muthuvel	DMK	23,959	38.67	2,797
Chengalpattu	25	Uthiramerur	S. Pakkur Subramanyan	AIADMK	34,877	45.03	K. M. Rajagopal	DMK	22,294	28.78	12,583
Chengalpattu	26	Kancheepuram	K. Balaji	AIADMK	31,327	35.47	V. Sambandan	DMK	29,380	33.27	1,947
Chengalpattu	27	Sriperumbudur (SC)	N. Krishnan	AIADMK	29,038	43	T. S. Lakshmanan	DMK	20,901	30.95	8,137
Chengalpattu	28	Poonamallee	D. Irajarathnam	DMK	26,552	36.49	Era. Kulasekaran	AIADMK	21,659	29.76	4,893
Chengalpattu	29	Thiruvallur	S. Pattabiraman	AIADMK	30,670	45.38	Munirathinam Naidu	JP	22,368	33.09	8,302
Chengalpattu	30	Tiruttani	R. Shanmugham	AIADMK	29,070	43.68	A. B. Ramachandran	DMK	18,754	28.18	10,316
Chengalpattu	31	Pallipattu	Eakambara Reddy	INC	23,480	33.62	K. M. Balaraman	AIADMK	19,194	27.49	4,286
North Arcot	32	Arakkonam (SC)	V. K. Raju	AIADMK	24,630	33.5	A. Kannayiram	DMK	17,041	23.18	7,589
North Arcot	33	Sholingur	S. J. Ramaswamy	AIADMK	25,997	38.23	K. Murthi	DMK	20,348	29.93	5,649
North Arcot	34	Ranipet	Durai Murugan	DMK	31,940	43.53	K. A. Wahab	Independent	16,643	22.68	15,297
North Arcot	35	Arcot	K. J. Uyyakondan	AIADMK	27,193	39.29	N. R. Ethirajulu	JP	16,614	24.01	10,579
North Arcot	36	Katpadi	M. A. Jayavelu	AIADMK	26,873	38.18	Sambasivam	DMK	22,183	31.51	4,690
North Arcot	37	Gudiyatham	V. K. Kothandaraman	CPI(M)	20,590	29.54	Soundarajulu Naidu	JP	18,046	25.89	2,544
North Arcot	38	Pernambut (SC)	I. Tamilarasan	AIADMK	24,536	37.21	P. Rajagopal	JP	20,873	31.66	3,663
North Arcot	39	Vaniyambadi	M. Abdul Latheef	Independent	26,620	42.86	R. Sampanghi	DMK	17,886	28.8	8,734
North Arcot	40	Natrampalli	T. Anbazhagan	AIADMK	31,015	44.43	M. Marappan	DMK	14,960	21.43	16,055
North Arcot	41	Tiruppattur	B. Sundaram	DMK	19,855	27.29	K. Jayaraman	AIADMK	18,857	25.92	998
North Arcot	42	Chengam (SC)	T. Swamikannu	AIADMK	22,789	46.36	N. Poosanar	DMK	11,877	24.16	10,912
North Arcot	43	Thandarambattu	D. Venugopal	DMK	28,605	38.01	A. Ramalingam	AIADMK	21,661	28.78	6,944
North Arcot	44	Tiruvannamalai	P. U. Shanmugam	DMK	27,148	32.22	D. Pattusamy	INC	25,786	30.61	1,362
North Arcot	45	Kalasapakkam	P. S. Thiruvengadam	DMK	26,841	35.39	S. Sundaresa Udayar	AIADMK	25,298	33.35	1,543
North Arcot	46	Polur	K. J. Subramanian	AIADMK	24,631	37.82	S. Murugaiyan	DMK	21,902	33.63	2,729
North Arcot	47	Anaicut	R. Margabandhu	AIADMK	32,731	48.78	P. M. Vasudeva Reddiar	JP	14,146	21.08	18,585
North Arcot	48	Vellore	A. K. Ranganathan	AIADMK	26,590	30.47	A. K. Lalalajapathy	JP	25,758	29.52	832
North Arcot	49	Arni	V. Arjunan	AIADMK	33,925	41.47	E. Selvarasu	DMK	24,703	30.2	9,222
North Arcot	50	Cheyyar	Pulavar Govindan	DMK	33,338	43.34	K. Shanmughasundaram	AIADMK	21,419	27.84	11,919
North Arcot	51	Vandavasi (SC)	P. Munuswamy	AIADMK	28,306	41.11	C. Kanniappan	DMK	26,476	38.45	1,830
North Arcot	52	Peranamallur	P. Chandran	AIADMK	27,860	40.47	P. Ettappan	DMK	19,822	28.79	8,038
South Arcot	53	Melmalayanur	P. Thangavelu Gounder	AIADMK	27,673	38.93	S. Vijayaraghavan	DMK	14,110	19.85	13,563
South Arcot	54	Gingee	Gingee N. Ramachandran	DMK	26,971	36.13	G. Krishnaswamy	AIADMK	23,381	31.32	3,590
South Arcot	55	Tindivanam	T. R. Erajaram Reddy	INC	18,990	29.55	R. Radhakrishnan	JP	17,150	26.69	1,840
South Arcot	56	Vanur (SC)	M. Paramasivam	DMK	21,557	34.32	A. Boopalan	AIADMK	19,584	31.18	1,973
South Arcot	57	Kandamangalam (SC)	M. Kannan	AIADMK	25,403	38.71	S. Alagavelu	DMK	23,349	35.58	2,054
South Arcot	58	Villupuram	P. Krishnan	AIADMK	27,882	37.69	K. P. Palaniappan	DMK	25,183	34.04	2,699
South Arcot	59	Mugaiyur	G. Rangothaman	AIADMK	31,531	45.74	M. Shanmugam	DMK	18,248	26.47	13,283
South Arcot	60	Tirunavalur	L. Arumugam	AIADMK	24,087	34.96	V. Subramanaian	DMK	19,132	27.77	4,955
South Arcot	61	Ulundurpet (SC)	V. Thulukkanam	DMK	26,788	37.7	Sathyavani Muthu	AIADMK	19,211	27.04	7,577
South Arcot	62	Nellikkuppam	C. Govindarajan	CPI(M)	23,077	32.75	V. Krishnamoorthy	DMK	18,260	25.91	4,817
South Arcot	63	Cuddalore	K. Abdul Latheef	AIADMK	24,107	31.61	R. Govindarajan	DMK	22,280	29.21	1,827
South Arcot	64	Panruti	S. Ramachandaran	AIADMK	43,330	59.24	K. Nandagopala Krishnan	JP	27,673	37.83	15,657
South Arcot	65	Kurinjipadi	M. Selvaraj	DMK	19,523	28.75	S. Natarajan	CPI(M)	16,997	25.03	2,526
South Arcot	66	Bhuvanagiri	V. Raghuraman	DMK	21,638	28.33	T. M. D. Mahalingam	JP	17,350	22.72	4,288
South Arcot	67	Kattumannarkoil (SC)	E. Ramalingam	DMK	26,038	37.54	R. Rajan	AIADMK	19,991	28.82	6,047
South Arcot	68	Chidambaram	Durai Kaliyamoorthy	DMK	22,917	31.3	Muthu Govindarajan	AIADMK	19,586	26.75	3,331
South Arcot	69	Virudhachalam	C. Ramanathan	AIADMK	30,178	39.59	K. Ramalingam	DMK	18,071	23.71	12,107
South Arcot	70	Mangalur	M. Periyasamy	AIADMK	30,616	40.32	V. Ponnuswamy	DMK	17,361	22.86	13,255
South Arcot	71	Rishivandiyam	M. Sundaram	INC	25,530	38.42	M. Deivigam	AIADMK	21,478	32.32	4,052
South Arcot	72	Chinnasalem	M. Subdramaniam	AIADMK	24,304	35.57	S. P. Pachayappan	DMK	21,081	30.86	3,223
South Arcot	73	Sankarapuram	Durai Muthusamy	INC	21,593	31.45	M. Mohammad Haneed	AIADMK	18,885	27.5	2,708
Dharmapuri	74	Hosur	N. Ramachandra Reddy	INC	30,818	58.12	K. S. Kothandaramiah	JP	13,653	25.75	17,615
Dharmapuri	75	Thalli	D. R. Rajaram Naidu	INC	18,559	30.53	B. venkataswamy	JP	13,388	22.02	5,171
Dharmapuri	76	Kaveripattinam	K. Samarasam	AIADMK	25,770	39.97	E. Pattabi Naidu	JP	19,312	29.95	6,458
Dharmapuri	77	Krishnagiri	K. R. Chinnarassu	AIADMK	17,178	32.66	T. M. Thiruppathy	JP	12,466	23.7	4,712
Dharmapuri	78	Bargur	H. G. Arumugam	AIADMK	28,812	48.94	V. C. Thimmarayan	DMK	15,420	26.19	13,392
Dharmapuri	79	Harur (SC)	M. Annamalai	CPI(M)	20,042	34.69	K. Surattaiyan	JP	12,470	21.59	7,572
Dharmapuri	80	Morappur	N. Kuppusamy	AIADMK	22,886	34.42	R. P. Murugan	DMK	21,270	31.99	1,616
Dharmapuri	81	Palacode	B. M. Krishnan	AIADMK	21,959	32.87	K. T. Govindan	JP	17,701	26.5	4,258
Dharmapuri	82	Dharmapuri	P. K. C. Muthusamy	JP	26,742	42.3	D. S. Shanmugam	AIADMK	21,556	34.1	5,186
Dharmapuri	83	Pennagaram	K. Appunu Gounder	JP	17,591	32.13	Krishnan	AIADMK	16,932	30.92	659
Salem	84	Mettur	K. P. Nachimuthu Gounder	AIADMK	30,762	43.67	P. Natesan	INC	13,976	19.84	16,786
Salem	85	Taramangalam	R. Narayanan	INC	23,882	34.59	S. Semmalai	AIADMK	23,863	34.56	19
Salem	86	Omalur	M. Sivaperumal	AIADMK	26,342	42.69	M. Govindan	JP	13,824	22.41	12,518
Salem	87	Yercaud (ST)	R. Kaliyappan	AIADMK	20,219	42.29	V. Chinnaswamy	DMK	13,444	28.12	6,775
Salem	88	Salem – I	S. V. Varadarajan	AIADMK	34,708	38.21	S. S. Mahadeva Mudaliar	JP	26,046	28.67	8,662
Salem	89	Salem – II	M. Arumugam	JP	22,636	31.41	K. A. Thangavelu	DMK	20,523	28.48	2,113
Salem	90	Veerapandi	P. Venga Gounder	AIADMK	31,920	44.87	M. Muthuswamy	DMK	18,144	25.5	13,776
Salem	91	Panamarathupatti	N. Subbarayan	AIADMK	27,676	45.04	S. C. Kanjamalai	DMK	14,478	23.56	13,198
Salem	92	Attur	C. Palanimuthu	INC	19,040	29.8	P. Kandasamy	AIADMK	18,693	29.25	347
Salem	93	Talavasal (SC)	S. M. Raju	AIADMK	24,681	36.33	K. Kaliyaperumal	INC	19,004	27.97	5,677
Salem	94	Rasipuram	P. Duraisamy	AIADMK	33,762	43.61	K. C. Periasamy	DMK	19,374	25.02	14,388
Salem	95	Senthamangalam	V. Chinnasamy	AIADMK	28,731	45.1	Vadama Gounder	INC	13,881	21.79	14,850
Salem	96	Namakkal (SC)	R. Arunachalam	AIADMK	31,952	40.59	K. Veluchamy	DMK	17,215	21.87	14,737
Salem	97	Kapilamalai	K. Sengodan	AIADMK	30,194	36.54	S. Paramasivam	JP	18,798	22.75	11,396
Salem	98	Tiruchengode	C. Ponnaiyan	AIADMK	44,501	46.11	V. Kumaraswamy	JP	17,764	18.41	26,737
Salem	99	Sankari (SC)	P. Dhanapal	AIADMK	32,780	53.27	M. Paramanandam	DMK	11,751	19.1	21,029
Salem	100	Edappadi	I. Ganesan	AIADMK	31,063	38.56	T. Natarajan	INC	24,256	30.11	6,807
Coimbatore	101	Mettupalayam	S. Palanisamy	AIADMK	26,029	32.37	T. T. S. Thippaiah	JP	20,717	25.76	5,312
Coimbatore	102	Avanashi (SC)	S. N. Palaniswamy	INC	22,550	32.26	R. Annanambi	AIADMK	20,803	29.76	1,747
Coimbatore	103	Thondamuthur	K. Maruthachalam	AIADMK	31,690	33.29	R. Manickavachagam	DMK	24,195	25.41	7,495
Coimbatore	104	Singanallur	R. Venkedusamy alias Venkedu	CPI(M)	25,820	27.96	R. Senkaliappan	JP	24,024	26.02	1,796
Coimbatore	105	Coimbatore (West)	C. Aranganayagam	AIADMK	27,742	36.8	B. S. Mohammad Ali	DMK	20,393	27.05	7,349
Coimbatore	106	Coimbatore (East)	K. Ramani	CPI(M)	20,803	30.54	K. Aranganathan	DMK	18,784	27.58	2,019
Coimbatore	107	Perur	A. Natarajan	DMK	29,158	33.74	M. Nanjappan	CPI(M)	26,328	30.46	2,830
Coimbatore	108	Kinathukadavu	K. V. Kandasamy	AIADMK	25,909	36.32	M. Kannappan	DMK	20,589	28.86	5,320
Coimbatore	109	Pollachi	O. P. Somasundaram	AIADMK	34,896	45.11	S. Raju	DMK	17,952	23.2	16,944
Coimbatore	110	Valparai (SC)	R. S. Thangavelu	AIADMK	20,926	34.18	A. T. Karuppiah	CPI	16,241	26.53	4,685
Coimbatore	111	Udumalaipettai	P. Kolandaivelu	AIADMK	28,737	34.3	U. K. P. Natarajan	JP	24,619	29.39	4,118
Coimbatore	112	Dharapuram (SC)	R. Ayyachamy	AIADMK	18,884	31.67	A. K. Shivalingam	INC	16,202	27.17	2,682
Coimbatore	113	Vellakoil	D. Ramaswamy	INC	30,996	37.69	M. Palanisamy	DMK	20,676	25.14	10,320
Coimbatore	114	Pongalur	K. Nachimuthu	AIADMK	20,324	32.56	S. R. Balasubramaniam	INC	18,769	30.07	1,555
Coimbatore	115	Palladam	P. G. Kittu	AIADMK	27,172	33.11	K. N. Kumarasamy	INC	20,175	24.58	6,997
Coimbatore	116	Tiruppur	R. Manimaran	AIADMK	38,984	41.13	A. Ganapathy	CPI	24,569	25.92	14,415
Coimbatore	117	Kangayam	R. K. S. Dhanapandi	AIADMK	31,665	42.09	M. Sivasabapathy	DMK	18,498	24.59	13,167
Coimbatore	118	Modakkurichi	Subbulakshmi	AIADMK	38,072	44.75	A. Ganeshamurthy	DMK	15,200	17.86	22,872
Coimbatore	119	Perundurai	A. Ponnusamy	AIADMK	30,574	39.91	N. K. Palanisamy	CPI	24,532	32.02	6,042
Coimbatore	120	Erode	S. Muthusamy	AIADMK	37,968	43.09	M. Subramanian	DMK	20,389	23.14	17,579
Coimbatore	121	Bhavani	M. R. Soundarrajan	AIADMK	22,989	31.41	G. Gurumoorthy	JP	19,013	25.98	3,976
Coimbatore	122	Anthiyur (SC)	P. Guruswamy	AIADMK	23,950	42.46	A. Palani	JP	11,423	20.25	12,527
Coimbatore	123	Gobichettipalayam	N. K. K. Ramasamy	AIADMK	25,660	34.99	N. R. Thiruvenkadam	INC	19,248	26.25	6,412
Coimbatore	124	Bhavanisagar	V. K. Chinnaswamy	AIADMK	23,078	32.48	Sampoornam Swaminathan	DMK	21,631	30.44	1,447
Coimbatore	125	Sathyamangalam	K. A. Sengottaiyan	AIADMK	21,145	35.81	C. R. Rajappa	INC	19,639	33.26	1,506
Nilgiris	126	Coonoor (SC)	K. Rangasamy	DMK	22,649	42.33	C. Periasamy	AIADMK	13,150	24.58	9,499
Nilgiris	127	Ootacamund	B. Gopalan	AIADMK	18,134	28.94	K. Karuppasamy	DMK	18,005	28.74	129
Nilgiris	128	Gudalur	K. Hutchi Gowder	DMK	15,323	26.29	C. I. Allapitchai	Independent	14,963	25.68	360
Madurai	129	Palani (SC)	N. Palanivel	CPI(M)	23,810	34.53	S. R. P. Mani	INC	19,966	28.96	3,844
Madurai	130	Oddanchatram	A. P. Palaniappan	INC	27,000	37.09	K. Kuppuswamy	AIADMK	22,419	30.79	4,581
Madurai	131	Periyakulam	K. Pannai Sethuram	AIADMK	31,271	45.5	R. Ramaiah	INC	16,948	24.66	14,323
Madurai	132	Theni	V. R. Jayaraman	AIADMK	35,152	45.71	S. Veluchamy	DMK	18,579	24.16	16,573
Madurai	133	Bodinayakkanur	P. Ramadass	AIADMK	29,022	41.12	K. S. M. Ramachandran	INC	20,030	28.38	8,992
Madurai	134	Cumbum	R. Chandrasekharan	AIADMK	34,902	41.5	N. Natarajan	DMK	34,080	40.52	822
Madurai	135	Andipatti	K. Kandasamy	AIADMK	24,311	34.41	N. V. Gurusamy	JP	16,269	23.03	8,042
Madurai	136	Sedapatti	R. Muthiah	AIADMK	28,040	43.52	A. R. P. Alagarsamy	INC	17,018	26.41	11,022
Madurai	137	Thirumangalam	P. T. Saraswathy	AIADMK	29,493	44.3	N. S. V. Chithan	INC	27,720	41.63	1,773
Madurai	138	Usilampatti	P. K. Mookiah Thevar	AIFB	35,361	61.95	N. S. Ponniah	INC	11,422	20.01	23,939
Madurai	139	Nilakottai (SC)	A. Baluchamy	AIADMK	28,296	51.19	M. Muthuperiasamy	INC	9,799	17.73	18,497
Madurai	140	Sholavandan	V. Balaguruva Reddiar	AIADMK	29,968	40.02	A. Chandrasekaran	INC	23,455	31.32	6,513
Madurai	141	Thiruparankundram	K. Kalimuthu	AIADMK	33,850	41.39	V. Palani Andi Ambalam	INC	15,760	19.27	18,090
Madurai	142	Madurai West	T. P. M. Periyaswamy	AIADMK	32,342	43.06	Pon. Muthuramalingam	DMK	16,211	21.59	16,131
Madurai	143	Madurai Central	N. Lakshminarayanan	AIADMK	29,399	39.9	A. Rathinam	INC	16,420	22.28	12,979
Madurai	144	Madurai East	N. Sankaraiah	CPI(M)	24,263	33.45	A. G. Subbraman	INC	22,278	30.71	1,985
Madurai	145	Samayanallur (SC)	S. Selvaraj	AIADMK	34,019	44.5	C. Karuthanan	INC	19,658	25.71	14,361
Madurai	146	Melur	A. M. Paramasivan	AIADMK	33,111	36.07	K. V. Veeranambalam	INC	32,955	35.9	156
Madurai	147	Natham	M. Andi Ambalam	INC	29,055	44.97	R. Murugan	AIADMK	21,093	32.65	7,962
Madurai	148	Dindigul	N. Varadharajan	CPI(M)	33,614	45.19	V. S. Lakshmanan	DMK	13,732	18.46	19,882
Madurai	149	Athoor	A. Vellaisamy	AIADMK	31,590	45.4	A. M. T. Nachiappan	DMK	13,938	20.03	17,652
Madurai	150	Vedasandur	S. M. Vasan	AIADMK	26,995	37.21	S. Nanjunda Rao	INC	25,141	34.66	1,854
Tiruchirapalli	151	Aravakurichi	S. Sadasivam	INC	32,581	39.51	P. Ramasamy	DMK	21,547	26.13	11,034
Tiruchirapalli	152	Karur	K. Vadivel	AIADMK	33,856	35.11	S. Nallasamy	DMK	22,264	23.09	11,592
Tiruchirapalli	153	Krishnarayapuram (SC)	P. Soundarapandian	AIADMK	22,561	32.59	P. N. Thangavelraj	INC	21,967	31.73	594
Tiruchirapalli	154	Marungapuri	K. Karunanidhi Muthiah	INC	27,093	38.58	A. P. Raju	DMK	16,894	24.06	10,199
Tiruchirapalli	155	Kulithalai	P. E. Srinivasa Reddiar	INC	27,043	33.59	S. Rasu	AIADMK	19,396	24.09	7,647
Tiruchirapalli	156	Thottiam	K. P. Kathamuthu	AIADMK	25,638	31.85	K. M. Shanmugasundaram	INC	24,648	30.62	990
Tiruchirapalli	157	Uppiliapuram (ST)	R. Periasamy	INC	31,642	37.08	M. Atchayagopal	AIADMK	25,936	30.4	5,706
Tiruchirapalli	158	Musiri	P. Kothandaraman alias Musiri Putthan	AIADMK	34,569	39.27	V. S. Periasamy alias VSP	DMK	20,567	23.36	14,002
Tiruchirapalli	159	Lalgudi	K. N. Shanmugam	AIADMK	33,322	36.06	R. Gandhirajan	DMK	31,789	34.4	1,533
Tiruchirapalli	160	Perambalur (SC)	S. V. Ramasamy	AIADMK	37,400	56.53	K. S. Velusamy	DMK	16,459	24.88	20,941
Tiruchirapalli	161	Varahur (SC)	N. Perumal	AIADMK	36,023	52.39	K. Kanagasabai	DMK	23,919	34.79	12,104
Tiruchirapalli	162	Ariyalur	T. Arumugam	DMK	31,380	39.73	Karuppiah alias Asokan	AIADMK	30,125	38.14	1,255
Tiruchirapalli	163	Andimadam	T. Subramanian	AIADMK	36,885	56.45	S. Sivasubramaniam	DMK	22,056	33.76	14,829
Tiruchirapalli	164	Jayankondam	V. Krunamurthy	AIADMK	35,540	44.75	K. C. Ganesan	DMK	23,828	30.01	11,712
Tiruchirapalli	165	Srirangam	R. Soundararajan	AIADMK	26,200	31.31	M. Dharmalingam	DMK	21,135	25.26	5,065
Tiruchirapalli	166	Tiruchy – I	C. Manickam	AIADMK	21,908	33.29	A. V. Krishnamurthy	DMK	19,597	29.78	2,311
Tiruchirapalli	167	Tiruchy – II	K. Soundararajan	AIADMK	25,405	36.37	M. S. Venkatachalam	DMK	17,523	25.09	7,882
Tiruchirapalli	168	Thiruverumbur	K. S. Murugesan	DMK	24,594	32.06	V. Swaminathan	INC	23,742	30.95	852
Thanjavur	169	Sirkazhi (SC)	K. Subravelu	DMK	34,281	43.38	K. Balasubramaniam	AIADMK	29,405	37.21	4,876
Thanjavur	170	Poompuhar	S. Ganesan	DMK	34,105	44.95	G. Bharathi Mohan	CPI(M)	24,508	32.3	9,597
Thanjavur	171	Mayiladuthurai	N. Kittappa	DMK	29,829	39.34	M. M. S. Abdul Hassan	INC	21,237	28.01	8,592
Thanjavur	172	Kuttalam	R. Rajamaniam	DMK	30,819	39.92	G. Veeraiyan	CPI(M)	22,556	29.22	8,263
Thanjavur	173	Nannilam (SC)	M. Manimaran	DMK	33,636	41.75	P. Jayaraj	INC	24,527	30.44	9,109
Thanjavur	174	Tiruvarur (SC)	M. Karunanidhi Thazhai	DMK	38,528	44.27	P. S. Dhanuskody	CPI(M)	24,274	27.89	14,254
Thanjavur	175	Nagapattinam	R. Umanath	CPI(M)	31,519	39.65	A. Ambalavanan	DMK	30,809	38.76	710
Thanjavur	176	Vedaranyam	M. Meenakshisundaram	DMK	29,601	35.4	S. Devarajan	INC	28,009	33.5	1,592
Thanjavur	177	Thiruthuraipoondi (SC)	P. Uthirapathy	CPI	43,208	45.93	N. Kuppusamy	DMK	24,934	26.5	18,274
Thanjavur	178	Mannargudi	M. Ambigapathy	CPI	34,298	37.89	K. Balakrishnan	DMK	26,881	29.7	7,417
Thanjavur	179	Pattukkottai	A. R. Marimuthu	INC	25,993	30.13	V. R. K. Palaniappan	AIADMK	25,082	29.08	911
Thanjavur	180	Peravurani	M. R. Govindan	AIADMK	32,625	38.8	M. Masilamani	CPI	24,675	29.34	7,950
Thanjavur	181	Orathanad	T. M. Thailappan	DMK	31,866	35.5	N. Sivagnanam	INC	26,156	29.14	5,710
Thanjavur	182	Thiruvonam	Durai Govindarajan	AIADMK	23,779	29.06	Pulavar. T. Tholappan	DMK	21,566	26.36	2,213
Thanjavur	183	Thanjavur	S. Natarajan	DMK	33,418	41.72	R. Saminathan	AIADMK	23,662	29.54	9,756
Thanjavur	184	Tiruvaiyaru	G. Elangovan	DMK	28,500	36.96	P. C. Palaniyandi	AIADMK	23,197	30.08	5,303
Thanjavur	185	Papanasam	R. V. Soundararajan	INC	24,904	33.4	S. Sachidanandam	DMK	23,268	31.21	1,636
Thanjavur	186	Valangiman (SC)	A. Chellappa	DMK	24,270	36.01	P. Srinivasan	AIADMK	20,897	31	3,373
Thanjavur	187	Kumbakonam	S. R. Eradha	AIADMK	26,432	32.52	O. Vadivelu Mazhavarayar	INC	23,450	28.85	2,982
Thanjavur	188	Thiruvidaimarudur	S. Ramalingam	DMK	26,304	32.59	K. Govindarajulu	INC	24,489	30.34	1,815
Pudukottai	189	Tirumayam	N. Sundararaj	INC	20,694	25.92	P. Ponnambalam	AIADMK	20,637	25.85	57
Pudukottai	190	Kolathur (SC)	V. Chinniah	INC	27,071	36.55	T. Marimuthu	AIADMK	22,853	30.86	4,218
Pudukottai	191	Pudukkottai	Rajkumar Vijaya Raghunatha Thondaiman	INC	36,406	42.74	C. Anbarasan	AIADMK	19,352	22.72	17,054
Pudukottai	192	Alangudi	T. Pushparaju	INC	37,634	38.94	P. Thirumaran	AIADMK	27,059	28	10,575
Pudukottai	193	Arantangi	S. Thirunavukkarasu	AIADMK	35,468	37.45	P. Appukutty	CPI	24,528	25.9	10,940
Ramanathapuram	194	Tiruppattur	S. Shanmugham Koothagudi	CPI	21,579	27.45	C. T. Raja Chidambaram	AIADMK	21,238	27.02	341
Ramanathapuram	195	Karaikudi	P. Kaliyappan	AIADMK	27,403	32.03	P. Chidambaram	INC	27,163	31.75	240
Ramanathapuram	196	Tiruvadanai	KR. RM. Kariya Manickam Ambalam	INC	32,386	36.75	S. Anguchamy	AIADMK	28,650	32.51	3,736
Ramanathapuram	197	Ilaiyangudi	R. Sivasamy	CPI	17,677	24.22	V. Malaikannan	DMK	16,887	23.14	790
Ramanathapuram	198	Sivaganga	O. Subramanian	INC	23,495	30.59	K. R. Muruganandam	AIADMK	21,066	27.43	2,429
Ramanathapuram	199	Manamadurai (SC)	V. M. Subramanian	AIADMK	28,849	40.23	K. Paramalai	INC	26,794	37.36	2,055
Ramanathapuram	200	Paramakudi (SC)	K. Ugrapandian	AIADMK	27,303	36.31	K. Krishnan	INC	23,357	31.06	3,946
Ramanathapuram	201	Ramanathapuram	T. Ramasamy	AIADMK	33,048	46.86	S. K. Ganesan	JP	15,520	22.01	17,528
Ramanathapuram	202	Kadaladi	R. C. Subramanian	AIADMK	25,690	36.56	A. Piravanathan	DMK	12,299	17.5	13,391
Ramanathapuram	203	Mudukulathur	S. Balakrishnan	INC	17,709	24.13	V. Munisamy	Independent	14,844	20.23	2,865
Ramanathapuram	204	Aruppukottai	M. G. Ramachandran	AIADMK	43,065	56.23	M. Muthuvel Servai	JP	13,687	17.87	29,378
Ramanathapuram	205	Sattur	K. K. S. S. R. Ramachandran	AIADMK	38,772	43.24	M. Veerasamy	INC	21,830	24.35	16,942
Ramanathapuram	206	Virudhunagar	M. Sundararajan	AIADMK	33,077	44.52	A. S. A. Arumugam	JP	22,820	30.71	10,257
Ramanathapuram	207	Sivakasi	K. Ramasamy	JP	24,518	31.11	Dharmar	INC	22,746	28.87	1,772
Ramanathapuram	208	Srivilliputhur	R. Tamaraikani	AIADMK	25,990	31.91	V. Vaikundam	DMK	18,974	23.3	7,016
Ramanathapuram	209	Rajapalayam (SC)	K. Dhanuskodi	AIADMK	28,028	37.55	K. Pottu Poattan	INC	24,181	32.39	3,847
Tirunelveli	210	Vilathikulam	R. K. Perumal	AIADMK	25,384	38.39	K. Subba Reddiar	INC	22,001	33.27	3,383
Tirunelveli	211	Ottapidaram (SC)	O. S. Veluchami	INC	22,629	41.51	O. Thangaraj	AIADMK	16,801	30.82	5,828
Tirunelveli	212	Kovilpatti	S. Alagarsamy	CPI	21,985	32.75	P. Seeniraj	AIADMK	21,588	32.15	397
Tirunelveli	213	Sankarankoil (SC)	S. Subbiah	DMK	13,778	20.52	C. Ayyadorai	AIADMK	21,232	33.72	337
Tirunelveli	214	Vasudevanallur (SC)	R. Krishnan	CPI(M)	20,092	33.25	I. muthuraj	CPI	16,048	26.56	4,044
Tirunelveli	215	Kadayanallur	M. M. A. Razak	AIADMK	29,347	38.78	S. K. T. Ramachandran	INC	23,686	31.3	5,661
Tirunelveli	216	Tenkasi	S. Muthusamy Karayalar	INC	30,273	41.36	J. Abdul Jabbar	Independent	18,489	25.26	11,784
Tirunelveli	217	Alangulam	V. Karuppasamy Pandian	AIADMK	20,183	28.43	R. Navaneethakrishnapandian	JP	18,342	25.84	1,841
Tirunelveli	218	Tirunelveli	G. R. Edmund	AIADMK	26,419	38.5	Krishnan alias Nellai Kannan	INC	19,125	27.87	7,294
Tirunelveli	219	Palayamkottai	K. Manoharan	AIADMK	29,146	44.1	N. Shanmugan	Independent	15,192	22.99	13,954
Tirunelveli	220	Cheranmadevi	P. H. Pandian	AIADMK	24,256	35.34	V. Ratnasabapathi	INC	21,964	32	2,292
Tirunelveli	221	Ambasamudram	Easwaramurthy alias Sornam	CPI(M)	23,356	35.33	R. Nallakannu	CPI	21,569	32.63	1,787
Tirunelveli	222	Nanguneri	M. John Vincent	JP	18,668	27.71	D. Veliah	AIADMK	18,464	27.41	204
Tirunelveli	223	Radhapuram	Y. S. M. Yusuf	AIADMK	26,404	38.68	P. Paul Pandian	JP	22,810	33.41	3,594
Tirunelveli	224	Sathankulam	R. Jebamani	JP	18,362	27.36	S. P. Adithanar	Independent	17,507	26.09	855
Tirunelveli	225	Tiruchendur	R. Amirtharaj	AIADMK	20,871	29.13	Subramanya Adithan	JP	19,736	27.55	1,135
Tirunelveli	226	Srivaikuntam	K. Sathu Selvaraj	AIADMK	20,459	31.29	S. Muthu	DMK	16,919	25.87	3,540
Tirunelveli	227	Thoothukudi	N. Dhanasekaran	AIADMK	23,598	29.29	R. Naoroji	INC	22,379	27.78	1,219
Kanyakumari	228	Kanyakumari	C. Krishnan	AIADMK	23,222	33.32	T. C. Subramaniya Pillai	INC	16,010	22.97	7,212
Kanyakumari	229	Nagercoil	M. Vincent	AIADMK	26,973	36.45	P. Mohammad Ismail	JP	26,780	36.19	193
Kanyakumari	230	Colachel	R. Athiswami	JP	21,131	30.4	S. Retnaraj	DMK	19,949	28.7	1,182
Kanyakumari	231	Padmanabhapuram	A. Swamidhas	JP	22,910	47.81	N. V. Kanniyappan	AIADMK	14,757	30.8	8,153
Kanyakumari	232	Thiruvattar	J. James	JP	27,812	48.82	J. Hemachandran	CPI(M)	26,192	45.98	1,620
Kanyakumari	233	Vilavancode	D. Gnanasigamony	CPI(M)	32,628	48.85	S. Sathiadas	JP	30,695	45.96	1,933
Kanyakumari	234	Killiyur	Pon. Vijayaraghavan	JP	34,237	79.2	K. Thankaraj	INC	8,309	19.22	25,928

Key:

Blue:	Elected as Chief Minister of Tamil Nadu
(SC)	Seat is reserved for scheduled caste.
(ST)	Seat is reserved for scheduled tribe.

== Aftermath and Government formation ==
After the victory, M. G. R. stated that his government would act with a sense of responsibility and remain committed to its promises despite any challenges. Responding to questions on the DMK emerging as the opposition, he noted that both parties shared a common stand on the language issue, though differing on others. Meanwhile, DMK president Karunanidhi, elected as Leader of the Opposition and Legislative party leader, rejected claims that the DMK had lost relevance, pointing to the election of 48 of its members and expressing confidence in strengthening the party for the future. M.G.R. delayed assuming office for 2 weeks in order to complete his prior film commitments, despite criticism from the DMK, which alleged that the delay was influenced by astrologers and Hindu religious figures. MGR maintained that he did not want film producers and distributors who had invested in his projects to suffer due to his political responsibilities. He completed crucial scenes for Meenava Nanban and the dubbing for Madhuraiyai Meetta Sundharapandiyan, He also intended to finish Anna Nee En Deivam, although financial difficulties prevented the latter’s completion. Portions of the unfinished footage were later used by director K. Bhagyaraj in the film Avasara Police 100 (1990 movie). On 29 June 1977, at around 11 p.m., after completing the final dubbing session for both his films, MGR bid farewell to his film career at Vijaya Vauhini Studios. Seeing crowds waiting with garlands outside, he reportedly remarked whether they were meant for the end of his film career or the beginning of his political rule. On 30 June 1977, M. G. Ramachandran was sworn in as Chief Minister of Tamil Nadu at a ceremony held at Rajaji Hall in Chennai, where a 14-member council of ministers assumed office, administered by Governor Prabhudas Patwari. After the swearing-in ceremony, M. G. Ramachandran and his cabinet colleagues proceeded to a grand stage in front of the C. N. Annadurai statue on Anna Salai, where he took the affirmation before the public and assured the people of a corruption-free and transparent administration. The election marked a decisive shift in Tamil Nadu politics, with the contest transitioning from a Congress and DMK rivalry to a predominantly Dravidian party competition between the AIADMK and the DMK, marginalising national parties, a pattern that has largely continued for decades. Contrary to later claims by MGR's associates, confidence in an AIADMK victory in the 1977 election was not widespread. The Tamil weekly Kumudam had predicted the Congress, Janata Party, and AIADMK as the top three, with the DMK last on its pre-poll prediction. However, the AIADMK won, followed by the DMK, Congress, and Janata Party.

== See also ==
- Elections in Tamil Nadu
- Legislature of Tamil Nadu
- Government of Tamil Nadu
