= Duraisamy =

Duraisamy is a surname. Notable people with the surname include:

- Duraisamy Simon Lourdusamy (born 1924), Indian Cardinal of the Roman Catholic Church
- B. Duraisamy, Indian politician, former Member of the Legislative Assembly of Tamil Nadu
- P. Duraisamy, Indian politician, former Member of the Legislative Assembly of Tamil Nadu
- R. Duraisamy, Indian politician, incumbent member of the Tamil Nadu Legislative Assembly
- S. Duraisamy, Indian politician, former Member of the Legislative Assembly of Tamil Nadu
- Saidai Sa. Duraisamy (born 1951), Indian Politician, incumbent Mayor of Corporation of Chennai
- V. P. Duraisamy, Indian politician of the Dravida Munnetra Kazhagam, Member of the Legislative Assembly of Tamil Nadu

== See also ==
- Darisa
- Dorisa
- Dreisam
