= K. Jeyakumar =

Indian politician

Member of Parliament, Lok Sabha
- In office 23 May 2019 – 4 June 2024
- Preceded by: Ponnusamy Venugopal
- Constituency: Thiruvallur

Member of the Tamil Nadu Legislative Assembly
- In office 13 May 2001 – 13 May 2011
- Preceded by: K. Veisamy
- Succeeded by: K. P. P. Baskar
- Constituency: Namakkal constituency

Personal details
- Born: 1 March 1950 (age 76) Madras State (now Tamil Nadu India)
- Party: Indian National Congress

K. Jayakumar is an Indian politician. He was elected as a Member of Parliament in Lok Sabha from Thiruvallur Constituency (SC) in 2019. He served as a Member of the Legislative Assembly of Tamil Nadu. He was elected as an Indian National Congress candidate from Namakkal constituency in 2001 and 2006 elections.

== Early life ==
Jayakumar was born in Pinayoor on 1 March 1950. He earned multiple degrees: B.E., M.Tech.(Mgt.)., P.G.Dip.RT. & M., P.G.Dip.I.D., (Holland). M.I.E., Ph.D.

== Career ==
He joined INC in 1976. He served as Secretary, All India Congress. He was a member of the All India Congress Committee. He served in Tamil Nadu Legislative Assembly from 2001-2006.

College Hockey Team Captain.

== Political responsibilities ==
- He has been National Secretary of the Indian National Congress For 15 years.
- He has been Member of Legislative Assembly two times(2001–06, 2006–11) in Namakkal.
- Treasurer : Congress Legislative Party – 2001 – 2006
- Leader : Legislative body – 2006 – 2011
- Member: Legislative Level Panel – 2006 – 2011
- Member: Legislative Standing Committee – 2006 – 2011
- Secretary: Tamilnadu Congress – 1998 – 2002

== Government Responsibilities ==
- Director: National Scheduled Castes Finance and Development Corporation (NSFDC)
- Director: National Insurance Company, Calcutta
- Senior Manager: Import and Export Bank, Mumbai
- Manager: TIDCO Chennai
- Manager: SIPCOT Chennai
- Engineer: National Highway Department, Chennai, HAL Bangalore.
