= Arunachalam =

Arunachala(m) may refer to:

- Arunachalam (name), an Indian name (including a list of persons with the name)
- Arunachalam (film), a 1997 Indian Tamil-language drama film directed by Sundar C
- Arunachala, a holy hill in Tamil Nadu, India
- 28833 Arunachalam, a minor planet discovered in 2000
- Arunachala Kavi (1711–1779), 18th-century Indian poet in Tamil

== See also ==
- Arunachal Pradesh, a state in northeastern India
