= Nadesan =

Nadesan நடேசன்
- Pronunciation: Naṭēcaṉ
- Gender: Male
- Language: Tamil; Malayalam

Origin
- Meaning: Shiva
- Region of origin: Southern India; North-eastern Sri Lanka

Other names
- Alternative spelling: Natesan; Nadeeshan
- Short form: Nadeesh

Nadesan or Natesan (Tamil: நடேசன்) is a South Indian male given name. Due to the South Indian tradition of using patronymic surnames, it may also be a surname for males and females.

== Notable people ==
=== Given name ===
- Aiyathurai Nadesan (died 2004), Sri Lankan journalist
- Balasingham Nadesan (died 2009), Sri Lankan rebel
- C. Natesa Mudaliar (1875–1937), Indian politician
- F. G. Natesa Iyer (1880–1963), Indian activist
- G. A. Natesan (1873–1948), Indian writer and politician
- K. Natesa Iyer (1887–1947), Ceylonese journalist, trade unionist and politician
- R. Nadesan, Indian politician
- S. Nadesan (1904–1986), Ceylonese lawyer
- S. Natesan (Subbaiya Nadesapillai) (1895–1965), Ceylonese politician
- S. V. Natesa Mudaliar, Indian politician
- V. Paulraj Natesan, Indian politician

=== Surname ===
- Kaliakudi Natesa Sastry, Indian musician
- Natesan Ramani (1934–2015), Indian musician
