= Namakkal Assembly constituency =

State Legislative Assembly Constituency in Tamil Nadu

Coordinates: 11°14′N 78°10′E

Namakkal
- Constituency No. 94 for the Tamil Nadu Legislative Assembly

Constituency details
- Country: India
- Region: South India
- State: Tamil Nadu
- District: Namakkal
- Lok Sabha constituency: Namakkal
- Established: 1951
- Total electors: 2,37,915
- Reservation: None

Member of Legislative Assembly
- 17th Tamil Nadu Legislative Assembly
- Incumbent C. S. Dilip
- Party: TVK
- Elected year: 2026

Namakkal is a state assembly constituency in Tamil Nadu, India. It comprises a portion of Namakkal taluk. Its State Assembly Constituency number is 94. It falls under Namakkal Lok Sabha constituency. It is one of the 234 State Legislative Assembly Constituencies in Tamil Nadu, in India. Elections and winners in the constituency are listed below.

== Members of Legislative Assembly ==
=== Madras State ===
Year	Winner	Party
1952	K. V. Ramaswamy	Communist Party of India and Indian National Congress
1957	P. Kolanda Gounder	Indian National Congress
1962	S. Chinnaiyan	Indian National Congress
1967	M. Muthuswamy	Dravida Munnetra Kazhagam

=== Tamil Nadu ===
Year	Winner	Party
1971	Palanivelan	Dravida Munnetra Kazhagam
1977	R. Arunachalam	All India Anna Dravida Munnetra Kazhagam
1980	R. Arunachalam	All India Anna Dravida Munnetra Kazhagam
1984	R. Arunachalam	All India Anna Dravida Munnetra Kazhagam
1989	P. Duraisamy	Dravida Munnetra Kazhagam
1991	S. Anbalagan	All India Anna Dravida Munnetra Kazhagam
1996	Mohanur K.Velusamy	Dravida Munnetra Kazhagam
2001	K. Jeyakumar	Indian National Congress
2006	K. Jeyakumar	Indian National Congress
2011	K. P. P. Baskar	All India Anna Dravida Munnetra Kazhagam
2016	K. P. P. Baskar	All India Anna Dravida Munnetra Kazhagam
2021	P. Ramalingam	Dravida Munnetra Kazhagam
2026	C. S. Dilip	Tamilaga Vettri Kazhagam

== Election results ==
Vote share of winning candidates
2026	37.56%
2021	51.83%
2016	45.81%
2011	56.34%
2006	42.57%
2001	58.14%
1996	62.15%
1991	70.72%
1989	35.57%
1984	56.93%
1980	51.78%
1977	40.59%
1971	53.57%
1967	54.37%
1962	48.48%
1957	30.18%
1952	21.32%

=== 2026 ===
2026 Tamil Nadu Legislative Assembly election: Namakkal
Party	Candidate	Votes	%	±%
TVK	C. S. Dilip	79,744	37.56	New
AIADMK	Sridevi Mohan P.S	68,736	32.38	▼5.89
DMK	Rani P	52,808	24.88	▼26.95
NTK	Praveenkumar K	6,286	2.96	▼1.97
NOTA	NOTA	760	0.36	▼0.27
Margin of victory		11,008	5.18	▼8.38
Turnout		2,12,283	89.23	▲9.52
Registered electors		2,37,915		▼19,856
TVK gain from DMK		Swing	▲37.56	

=== 2021 ===
2021 Tamil Nadu Legislative Assembly election: Namakkal
Party	Candidate	Votes	%	±%
DMK	P. Ramalingam	106,494	51.83%	New
AIADMK	K. P. P. Baskar	78,633	38.27%	−7.54
NTK	B. Baskar	10,122	4.93%	+3.52
MNM	S. Adham Farook	5,589	2.72%	New
NOTA	NOTA	1,285	0.63%	−1.34
Margin of victory		27,861	13.56%	6.60%
Turnout		205,474	79.71%	−0.43%
Rejected ballots		188	0.09%	
Registered electors		257,771		
DMK gain from AIADMK		Swing	6.02%	

=== 2016 ===
2016 Tamil Nadu Legislative Assembly election: Namakkal
Party	Candidate	Votes	%	±%
AIADMK	K. P. P. Baskar	89,076	45.81%	−10.53
INC	R. Chezhian	75,542	38.85%	New
KMDK	V. S. Matheswaran	10,506	5.40%	New
TMC(M)	N. Elango	4,341	2.23%	New
NOTA	NOTA	3,828	1.97%	New
BJP	V. Rajendran	2,751	1.41%	+0.14
PMK	E. Duraisamy	2,751	1.41%	New
NTK	M. Loganathan	2,729	1.40%	New
Independent	C. Murugan	997	0.51%	New
Margin of victory		13,534	6.96%	−14.17%
Turnout		194,441	80.14%	−1.91%
Registered electors		242,615		
AIADMK hold		Swing	-10.53%	

=== 2011 ===
2011 Tamil Nadu Legislative Assembly election: Namakkal
Party	Candidate	Votes	%	±%
AIADMK	K. P. P. Baskar	95,579	56.34%	+19.39
KNMK	R. Devarasan	59,724	35.20%	New
IJK	C. Sathyamoorthy	2,996	1.77%	New
BJP	K. Palaniappan	2,168	1.28%	−0.23
Independent	S. Arjunan	1,333	0.79%	New
Independent	T. Baskar	1,101	0.65%	New
Independent	P. Murugasen	1,015	0.60%	New
Independent	M. Natarajan	993	0.59%	New
Ulzaipali Makkal Katchy	P. Murugan	910	0.54%	New
Independent	M. Devaraj	901	0.53%	New
Independent	K. Manoharan	895	0.53%	New
Margin of victory		35,855	21.13%	15.51%
Turnout		206,748	82.06%	14.21%
Registered electors		169,649		
AIADMK gain from INC		Swing	13.77%	

=== 2006 ===
2006 Tamil Nadu Legislative Assembly election: Namakkal
Party	Candidate	Votes	%	±%
INC	K. Jeyakumar	61,306	42.57%	−15.57
AIADMK	R. Saradha	53,207	36.95%	New
DMDK	P. Amudha	22,401	15.56%	New
BJP	M. Natarajan	2,178	1.51%	New
Independent	A. Natarajan	1,496	1.04%	New
BSP	A. Vijayambal	853	0.59%	+0.06
Margin of victory		8,099	5.62%	−19.46%
Turnout		143,999	67.85%	14.15%
Registered electors		212,232		
INC hold		Swing	-15.57%	

=== 2001 ===
2001 Tamil Nadu Legislative Assembly election: Namakkal
Party	Candidate	Votes	%	±%
INC	K. Jeyakumar	67,215	58.14%	New
PT	S. Ahilan	38,223	33.06%	New
MDMK	V. Chakravarthi	4,014	3.47%	−0.92
Independent	M. Madeswaran	1,616	1.40%	New
Independent	R. Selvi	905	0.78%	New
Independent	C. Bharathi	808	0.70%	New
Independent	T. Marudhan	779	0.67%	New
BSP	K. S. Murugesan	614	0.53%	New
Independent	R. Ponnaiah	596	0.52%	New
Margin of victory		28,992	25.08%	−5.70%
Turnout		115,601	53.70%	−12.29%
Registered electors		215,295		
INC gain from DMK		Swing	-4.01%	

=== 1996 ===
1996 Tamil Nadu Legislative Assembly election: Namakkal
Party	Candidate	Votes	%	±%
DMK	K. Veisamy	76,860	62.15%	+35.71
AIADMK	S. Anbalagan	38,795	31.37%	−39.35
MDMK	R. Mayavan	5,435	4.39%	New
Independent	K. Ravinthiran	1,444	1.17%	New
Margin of victory		38,065	30.78%	−13.50%
Turnout		123,665	65.99%	3.21%
Registered electors		196,881		
DMK gain from AIADMK		Swing	-8.57%	

=== 1991 ===
1991 Tamil Nadu Legislative Assembly election: Namakkal
Party	Candidate	Votes	%	±%
AIADMK	S. Anbalagan	79,683	70.72%	+38.84
DMK	R. Mayavan	29,788	26.44%	−9.13
BJP	P. Chandrasekaran	1,498	1.33%	+0.77
PMK	V. Tamilarasan	744	0.66%	New
Margin of victory		49,895	44.28%	40.60%
Turnout		112,669	62.79%	−8.97%
Registered electors		186,364		
AIADMK gain from DMK		Swing	35.16%	

=== 1989 ===
1989 Tamil Nadu Legislative Assembly election: Namakkal
Party	Candidate	Votes	%	±%
DMK	P. Duraisamy	41,979	35.57%	−4.44
AIADMK	S. Raju	37,636	31.89%	−25.04
INC	V. K. R. Rajaram	28,606	24.24%	New
AIADMK	M. Durairaj	7,474	6.33%	−50.6
Independent	P. Kandasamy	824	0.70%	New
BJP	T. V. Andi	659	0.56%	−0.55
Margin of victory		4,343	3.68%	−13.25%
Turnout		118,026	71.75%	−1.70%
Registered electors		168,337		
DMK gain from AIADMK		Swing	-21.36%	

=== 1984 ===
1984 Tamil Nadu Legislative Assembly election: Namakkal
Party	Candidate	Votes	%	±%
AIADMK	R. Arunachalam	58,158	56.93%	+5.15
DMK	K. Veluchami	40,868	40.01%	−7.07
BJP	T. V. Andi	1,131	1.11%	New
Margin of victory		17,290	16.93%	12.22%
Turnout		102,155	73.46%	11.36%
Registered electors		149,546		
AIADMK hold		Swing	5.15%	

=== 1980 ===
1980 Tamil Nadu Legislative Assembly election: Namakkal
Party	Candidate	Votes	%	±%
AIADMK	R. Arunachalam	42,850	51.78%	+11.19
DMK	K. Veluswamy	38,957	47.07%	+25.21
Independent	Arjunan	521	0.63%	New
Independent	Kondan	429	0.52%	New
Margin of victory		3,893	4.70%	−14.02%
Turnout		82,757	62.09%	0.64%
Registered electors		134,869		
AIADMK hold		Swing	11.19%	

=== 1977 ===
1977 Tamil Nadu Legislative Assembly election: Namakkal
Party	Candidate	Votes	%	±%
AIADMK	R. Arunachalam	31,952	40.59%	New
DMK	K. Veluchamy	17,215	21.87%	−31.7
INC	V. K. Ramaswamy	14,564	18.50%	−22.73
JP	R. Kandasamy	12,729	16.17%	New
Independent	S. Shanmughamoopan	1,699	2.16%	New
Margin of victory		14,737	18.72%	6.39%
Turnout		78,720	61.45%	−13.41%
Registered electors		129,817		
AIADMK gain from DMK		Swing	-12.98%	

=== 1971 ===
1971 Tamil Nadu Legislative Assembly election: Namakkal
Party	Candidate	Votes	%	±%
DMK	Palani Velan	39,553	53.57%	−0.8
INC	Kaliappan	30,447	41.23%	−2.32
Independent	S. Ramasamy	3,296	4.46%	New
Independent	P. Karuppannan	543	0.74%	New
Margin of victory		9,106	12.33%	1.52%
Turnout		73,839	74.85%	−7.02%
Registered electors		101,824		
DMK hold		Swing	-0.80%	

=== 1967 ===
1967 Madras Legislative Assembly election: Namakkal
Party	Candidate	Votes	%	±%
DMK	M. Muthuswamy	39,510	54.37%	+9.19
INC	V. R. K. Gounder	31,651	43.55%	−4.93
Independent	R. K. M. P. Pandaram	849	1.17%	New
Independent	Radhikrishnan	661	0.91%	New
Margin of victory		7,859	10.81%	7.52%
Turnout		72,671	81.87%	13.90%
Registered electors		91,404		
DMK gain from INC		Swing	5.89%	

=== 1962 ===
1962 Madras Legislative Assembly election: Namakkal
Party	Candidate	Votes	%	±%
INC	S. Chinnayan	26,756	48.48%	+18.3
DMK	K. V. Rasappan	24,937	45.18%	New
TNP	T. V. Sundrarasan	2,129	3.86%	New
Independent	Shunmugham	802	1.45%	New
Independent	Shunmugha Moopan	567	1.03%	New
Margin of victory		1,819	3.30%	−3.98%
Turnout		55,191	67.97%	−10.46%
Registered electors		84,239		
INC hold		Swing	18.30%	

=== 1957 ===
1957 Madras Legislative Assembly election: Namakkal
Party	Candidate	Votes	%	±%
INC	P. Kolanda Gounder	38,977	30.18%	+10.34
Independent	V. Kaliappan	29,575	22.90%	New
INC	M. P. Periasami	24,240	18.77%	−1.07
Independent	Marudaveeran (Sc)	13,105	10.15%	New
CPI	K. V. Ramasami	10,026	7.76%	−13.55
Independent	N. Nallappa Reddiar	6,350	4.92%	New
Independent	Shanmuga Moopan	4,172	3.23%	New
Independent	Rathnam (Sc)	2,695	2.09%	New
Margin of victory		9,402	7.28%	5.81%
Turnout		129,140	78.44%	−14.47%
Registered electors		164,642		
INC gain from CPI		Swing	8.87%	

=== 1952 ===
1952 Madras Legislative Assembly election: Namakkal
Party	Candidate	Votes	%	±%
CPI	K. V. Ramaswamy	29,654	21.32%	New
INC	M. P. Periaswami	27,602	19.84%	New
INC	T. Sivaghanam Pillai	27,471	19.75%	New
Independent	S. Chinnayan	19,068	13.71%	New
Independent	Shanmughamoopan	7,853	5.64%	New
Independent	V. Naingn	7,839	5.63%	New
Independent	C. Marudaveeran	6,138	4.41%	New
Independent	K Perumal	5,748	4.13%	New
RPI	V. M. Palanivel	4,285	3.08%	New
Independent	K. Marimuthu	3,458	2.49%	New
Margin of victory		2,052	1.48%	
Turnout		139,116	92.91%	
Registered electors		149,737		
CPI win (new seat)				
