= G. Gothandaraman =

Indian politician (born 1949)

Member of the Legislative Assembly (MLA), Tamil Nadu Legislative Assembly
- In office 2001–2006
- Preceded by: A. G. Sampath
- Succeeded by: V. A. T. Kaliyavarathan
- Constituency: Mugaiyur

Personal details
- Born: 25 April 1949 Kodungal
- Party: All India Anna Dravida Munnetra Kazhagam
- Relations: Gopal (Father)
- Education: Bachelor of Laws, Madras University (1983)
- Profession: Lawyer

Gopal Gothandaraman is an Indian politician and a former Member of the Tamil Nadu Legislative Assembly. He hails from Tirukkoyilur town in the Villupuram district. Having completed his Bachelor’s degree and a Bachelor of Laws (LLB), Gothandaraman is a member of the Dravida Munnetra Kazhagam (DMK) party. He was elected to the Tamil Nadu Legislative Assembly in the 2001 elections from the Mugaiyur Assembly constituency.

== Electoral Performance ==
=== 2001 ===
2001 Tamil Nadu Legislative Assembly election: Mugaiyur
Party	Candidate	Votes	%	±%
AIADMK	G. Gothandaraman	57,484	51.30%	27.19%
DMK	A. G. Sampath	47,143	42.07%	−19.70%
MDMK	P. Susainathan	3,245	2.90%	0.22%
Independent	G. Lakshminarayanan	2,625	2.34%	
Independent	K. P. Palaniappan	1,091	0.97%	
Independent	T. Kumar	475	0.42%	
Margin of victory		10,341	9.23%	−28.44%
Turnout		112,063	62.37%	−5.29%
Registered electors		179,691		
AIADMK gain from DMK		Swing	-10.47%	
