= N. Perumal =

Indian politician

N. Perumal was an Indian politician and former Member of the Legislative Assembly of Tamil Nadu. He was elected to the Tamil Nadu legislative assembly as an Anna Dravida Munnetra Kazhagam candidate from Varahur constituency in 1977, and 1980 elections.
