= N. Marudachalam =

Indian politician

N. Marudachalam is an Indian politician and former Member of the Legislative Assembly of Tamil Nadu. He was elected to the Tamil Nadu legislative assembly as a Communist Party of India (Marxist) candidate from Perur constituency in 1967 election and as a Communist Party of India in 1971 election.
