= V. Alban =

Indian politician

Dr. V. Alban (died 18 March 1999) was an Indian politician and Member of the Legislative Assembly. He was elected to the Tamil Nadu legislative assembly as a Dravida Munnetra Kazhagam candidate from the Thiruvattar constituency in Kanyakumari district in the 1996 election.

Alban died on 18 March 1999.
