= Mugaiyur Assembly constituency =

Coordinates: 12.47°N 80.11°E

Mugaiyur
- Former constituency for the Tamil Nadu Legislative Assembly

Constituency details
- Country: India
- Region: South India
- State: Tamil Nadu
- District: Villupuram
- Established: 1967
- Abolished: 2008
- Total electors: 1,88,747

Mugaiyur is a state assembly constituency in Viluppuram district in Tamil Nadu. After the delimitation of constituencies in 2008, it was reorganised into Tirukkoyilur Assembly constituency.

== Members of the Legislative Assembly ==
Year	Winner	Party
1967	A. Govindasamy	Dravida Munnetra Kazhagam
1971	A. G. Padmavathi	Dravida Munnetra Kazhagam
1977	G. Rangothaman	All India Anna Dravida Munnetra Kazhagam
1980	R. Sundaramurthy	Indian National Congress (I)
1984	M. Chandrasekhar	All India Anna Dravida Munnetra Kazhagam
1989	A. G. Sampath	Dravida Munnetra Kazhagam
1991	R. Savithiri Ammal	All India Anna Dravida Munnetra Kazhagam
1996	A. G. Sampath	Dravida Munnetra Kazhagam
2001	G. Gothandaraman	All India Anna Dravida Munnetra Kazhagam
2006	V. A. T. Kaliyavarthan	Pattali Makkal Katchi

== Election results ==
=== 2006 ===
2006 Tamil Nadu Legislative Assembly election: Mugaiyur
Party	Candidate	Votes	%	±%
PMK	V. A. T. Kaliyavarathan	46,313	36.10%	
VCK	M. Sinthanai Selvan	26,807	20.89%	
DMDK	L. Venkatesan	24,686	19.24%	
Independent	A. G. Sampath	21,384	16.67%	
Independent	N. Ragu	2,900	2.26%	
Independent	A. V. Sampath	1,701	1.33%	
Independent	R. Sampath	1,087	0.85%	
Independent	R. Krishnamoorthy	738	0.58%	
Independent	R. Sakthivel	534	0.42%	
SP	K. Kumar	503	0.39%	
Independent	V. Sampath	420	0.33%	
Margin of victory		19,506	15.20%	5.98%
Turnout		128,303	67.98%	5.60%
Registered electors		188,747		
PMK gain from AIADMK		Swing	-15.20%	

=== 2001 ===
2001 Tamil Nadu Legislative Assembly election: Mugaiyur
Party	Candidate	Votes	%	±%
AIADMK	G. Gothandaraman	57,484	51.30%	27.19%
DMK	A. G. Sampath	47,143	42.07%	−19.70%
MDMK	P. Susainathan	3,245	2.90%	0.22%
Independent	G. Lakshminarayanan	2,625	2.34%	
Independent	K. P. Palaniappan	1,091	0.97%	
Independent	T. Kumar	475	0.42%	
Margin of victory		10,341	9.23%	−28.44%
Turnout		112,063	62.37%	−5.29%
Registered electors		179,691		
AIADMK gain from DMK		Swing	-10.47%	

=== 1996 ===
1996 Tamil Nadu Legislative Assembly election: Mugaiyur
Party	Candidate	Votes	%	±%
DMK	A. G. Sampath	68,215	61.77%	31.19%
AIADMK	T. M. Arangarathan	26,619	24.10%	−31.81%
PMK	V. A. T. Kalivaradhan	10,371	9.39%	
MDMK	P. Rajagopal	2,950	2.67%	
Independent	V. Yesu @ Yesudasan	711	0.64%	
CPI(ML)L	I. V. Kovalan	537	0.49%	
Independent	G. Mohanraj	232	0.21%	
Independent	S. Rajendran	204	0.18%	
Independent	S. Subramani	146	0.13%	
Independent	A. Sivaglanam	116	0.11%	
Independent	E. Govindarajan	111	0.10%	
Margin of victory		41,596	37.67%	12.34%
Turnout		110,432	67.66%	−0.08%
Registered electors		168,995		
DMK gain from AIADMK		Swing	5.86%	

=== 1991 ===
1991 Tamil Nadu Legislative Assembly election: Mugaiyur
Party	Candidate	Votes	%	±%
AIADMK	R. Ammal Savithiri	56,118	55.91%	41.51%
DMK	A. G. Sampath	30,698	30.58%	−14.64%
PMK	A. Subramaniam	13,020	12.97%	
Independent	M. Kesavan	249	0.25%	
Independent	K. Somalingam	193	0.19%	
Independent	C. Arjunan	93	0.09%	
Margin of victory		25,420	25.33%	10.81%
Turnout		100,371	67.74%	−4.05%
Registered electors		155,325		
AIADMK gain from DMK		Swing	10.69%	

=== 1989 ===
1989 Tamil Nadu Legislative Assembly election: Mugaiyur
Party	Candidate	Votes	%	±%
DMK	A. G. Sampath	43,585	45.22%	6.62%
INC	M. Longan	29,599	30.71%	
AIADMK	G. Ragothaman	13,875	14.40%	−42.48%
AIADMK	G. Gothanda Raman	7,426	7.70%	−49.17%
Independent	S. Subramani	311	0.32%	
INC(J)	G. J. Raman Yadav	304	0.32%	
Independent	N. Kumar	283	0.29%	
Independent	R. Basi Raja	279	0.29%	
Independent	C. Dhanarajan	235	0.24%	
Independent	S. Palanisamy	232	0.24%	
Independent	M. P. Panneer Selvam	141	0.15%	
Margin of victory		13,986	14.51%	−3.76%
Turnout		96,380	71.79%	−1.71%
Registered electors		137,681		
DMK gain from AIADMK		Swing	-11.65%	

=== 1984 ===
1984 Tamil Nadu Legislative Assembly election: Mugaiyur
Party	Candidate	Votes	%	±%
AIADMK	M. Chandrasekar	45,863	56.87%	13.94%
DMK	A. G. Sampath	31,128	38.60%	
Independent	S. Periyanayagam	2,590	3.21%	
Independent	A. Subramaniyam	624	0.77%	
Independent	T. Balakrishnan	248	0.31%	
Independent	Arjunan	188	0.23%	
Margin of victory		14,735	18.27%	8.04%
Turnout		80,641	73.50%	10.85%
Registered electors		119,737		
AIADMK gain from INC		Swing	3.70%	

=== 1980 ===
1980 Tamil Nadu Legislative Assembly election: Mugaiyur
Party	Candidate	Votes	%	±%
INC	R. Sundaramurthy	39,490	53.17%	45.96%
AIADMK	G. Ragothuman	31,889	42.94%	−2.80%
JP	N. Ramu	985	1.33%	
Independent	S. Natesa Kander	897	1.21%	
Independent	R. Vijayakumar	775	1.04%	
Independent	S. Joseph	233	0.31%	
Margin of victory		7,601	10.23%	−9.04%
Turnout		74,269	62.65%	−2.22%
Registered electors		120,828		
INC gain from AIADMK		Swing	7.43%	

=== 1977 ===
1977 Tamil Nadu Legislative Assembly election: Mugaiyur
Party	Candidate	Votes	%	±%
AIADMK	G. Rangothaman	31,531	45.74%	
DMK	M. Shanmugam	18,248	26.47%	−33.51%
JP	P. G. Krishnaswamy	12,012	17.43%	
INC	G. Janakiraman	4,970	7.21%	−23.14%
Independent	I. Elumalai	834	1.21%	
Independent	S. Pandurangan	740	1.07%	
Independent	T. S. Mohamad Usman	598	0.87%	
Margin of victory		13,283	19.27%	−10.36%
Turnout		68,933	64.87%	−7.60%
Registered electors		108,393		
AIADMK gain from DMK		Swing	-14.24%	

=== 1971 ===
1971 Tamil Nadu Legislative Assembly election: Mugaiyur
Party	Candidate	Votes	%	±%
DMK	A. G. Padmavathi	38,744	59.98%	3.56%
INC	K. A. Ranganathan	19,605	30.35%	−8.00%
Independent	M. Govindarasan	4,581	7.09%	
Independent	E. Venkatesaperumal	1,662	2.57%	
Margin of victory		19,139	29.63%	11.56%
Turnout		64,592	72.47%	−7.28%
Registered electors		95,971		
DMK hold		Swing	3.56%	

=== 1967 ===
1967 Madras Legislative Assembly election: Mugaiyur
Party	Candidate	Votes	%	±%
DMK	A. Govindasamy	37,598	56.42%	
INC	N. K Ganapathy	25,555	38.35%	
Independent	A. Antoniswamy	2,674	4.01%	
Independent	S. N. Kander	810	1.22%	
Margin of victory		12,043	18.07%	
Turnout		66,637	79.75%	
Registered electors		87,691		
DMK win (new seat)				
