= P. Ramasamy Pillai =

Indian politician

Ramasamy Pillai was an Indian politician and former Member of the Legislative Assembly. He was elected to the Travancore-Cochin assembly as Travancore Tamil Nadu Congress candidate from Thiruvattar constituency in Kanyakumari district in 1952 and 1954 elections. These first elections were held before Kanyakumari district merged with Tamil Nadu.
