= Perur Assembly constituency =

Constituency in Coimbatore district, India

Coordinates: 10.97°N 76.9°E

Perur
- Former constituency for the Tamil Nadu Legislative Assembly

Constituency details
- Country: India
- Region: South India
- State: Tamil Nadu
- District: Coimbatore
- Established: 1967
- Abolished: 2008
- Total electors: 337,402
- Reservation: None

Perur is a legislative assembly constituency in Coimbatore district, that includes the city, Perur. Perur was reserved for Scheduled Castes from 1967 to 1977. Perur Assembly constituency was part of Coimbatore Lok Sabha constituency.

== Members of the Legislative Assembly ==
Assembly	Duration	Winner	Party
Fourth	1967–71	N. Marudachalam	Communist Party of India (Marxist)
Fifth	1971–77	N. Marudachalam	Communist Party of India
Sixth	1977–80	A. Natarajan	Dravida Munnetra Kazhagam
Seventh	1980–84	Kovaithambi	All India Anna Dravida Munnetra Kazhagam
Eighth	1984–89	A. Natarajan	Dravida Munnetra Kazhagam
Ninth	1989–91	A. Natarajan	Dravida Munnetra Kazhagam
Tenth	1991–96	K. P. Raju	All India Anna Dravida Munnetra Kazhagam
Eleventh	1996–01	A. Natarajan	Dravida Munnetra Kazhagam
Twelfth	2001–06	M. A. P. A. Krishnakumar	All India Anna Dravida Munnetra Kazhagam
Thirteenth	2006–2011	S. P. Velumani	All India Anna Dravida Munnetra Kazhagam

== De-Notification ==
The Perur Constituency was de-notified and removed from the list of constituencies in 2007. The areas coming under it were merged with the existing Thondamuthur and the newly created North Coimbatore Constituency.

== Election results ==
Vote share of winning candidates
2006	46.33%
2001	55.50%
1996	61.01%
1991	57.55%
1989	47.40%
1984	52.63%
1980	48.04%
1977	33.74%
1971	57.68%
1967	61.49%

=== 2006 ===
2006 Tamil Nadu Legislative Assembly election: Perur
Party	Candidate	Votes	%	±%
AIADMK	S. P. Velumani	114,024	46.33%	−9.17%
DMK	N. Rukumani	99,789	40.54%	5.73%
DMDK	S. Rajasekar	21,829	8.87%	
BJP	K. P. Ramamurthy	3,913	1.59%	
LJP	P. Saminathan	1,056	0.43%	
Independent	V. V. Varadharajan	1,038	0.42%	
Independent	M. Jayaraj	818	0.33%	
Independent	K. Velumani	793	0.32%	
BSP	K. Sivakumar	610	0.25%	
Independent	V. Rukmani	490	0.20%	
AIFB	A. Noormohammad	449	0.18%	
Margin of victory		14,235	5.78%	−14.90%
Turnout		246,121	72.95%	16.23%
Registered electors		337,402		
AIADMK hold		Swing	-9.17%	

=== 2001 ===
2001 Tamil Nadu Legislative Assembly election: Perur
Party	Candidate	Votes	%	±%
AIADMK	M. A. P. A. Krishnakumar Alias Rohini	94,607	55.50%	30.89%
DMK	N. Nageswari Thirumathi	59,343	34.81%	−26.20%
MDMK	M. Palaniswamy	9,979	5.85%	
Independent	M. Shenbhakaraj	2,304	1.35%	
Independent	A. Maheswari	1,989	1.17%	
Independent	A. Noor Mohammed	889	0.52%	
Independent	G. Parameswari	680	0.40%	
Independent	L. Sivakumar	673	0.39%	
Margin of victory		35,264	20.69%	−15.71%
Turnout		170,464	56.72%	−8.13%
Registered electors		300,569		
AIADMK gain from DMK		Swing	-5.51%	

=== 1996 ===
1996 Tamil Nadu Legislative Assembly election: Perur
Party	Candidate	Votes	%	±%
DMK	A. Natarajan	96,507	61.01%	25.72%
AIADMK	R. Thirumalaisamy	38,934	24.61%	−32.93%
CPI(M)	N. Amirtham	13,007	8.22%	
BJP	Chellappan	4,532	2.87%	−2.59%
JP	Perur Nagaraj	598	0.38%	
Independent	C. K. V. Selvaraj	551	0.35%	
IC(S)	R. Bhoopathiraja	414	0.26%	
Independent	R. Krishnasamy	402	0.25%	
ATMK	Siddhan @ Gurusamy Siddhan	350	0.22%	
PMK	Raja	304	0.19%	
Independent	Eswaran	285	0.18%	
Margin of victory		57,573	36.40%	14.14%
Turnout		158,182	64.85%	3.57%
Registered electors		256,109		
DMK gain from AIADMK		Swing	3.46%	

=== 1991 ===
1991 Tamil Nadu Legislative Assembly election: Perur
Party	Candidate	Votes	%	±%
AIADMK	K. P. Raju	76,676	57.55%	43.61%
DMK	A. Natarajan	47,017	35.29%	−12.11%
BJP	V. Doraibalu	7,270	5.46%	
JP	K. Loganathan	402	0.30%	
PMK	K. Jothi	332	0.25%	
INS(SCS)	M. M. Ebrahim	306	0.23%	
THMM	M. Chinnasamy	303	0.23%	
Independent	A. Jinnah Mohammed	224	0.17%	
Independent	M. Jayaraj	211	0.16%	
Independent	K. B. Balan	142	0.11%	
Independent	S. Sangupandian	124	0.09%	
Margin of victory		29,659	22.26%	0.29%
Turnout		133,240	61.28%	−10.89%
Registered electors		225,491		
AIADMK gain from DMK		Swing	10.15%	

=== 1989 ===
1989 Tamil Nadu Legislative Assembly election: Perur
Party	Candidate	Votes	%	±%
DMK	A. Natarajan	64,565	47.40%	−5.23%
Independent	V. D. Balasubramanian	34,632	25.42%	
AIADMK	N. Parathagan Alias Sinna Thambi	18,989	13.94%	−32.32%
Independent	S. Radhakrishnan	15,649	11.49%	
Independent	K. Subramanian	1,048	0.77%	
Independent	K. G. Rajamanickam	480	0.35%	
Independent	S. Selvaraj	412	0.30%	
Independent	P. Kandasamy	270	0.20%	
Independent	M. Jeyaraj	177	0.13%	
Margin of victory		29,933	21.97%	15.60%
Turnout		136,222	72.17%	−0.05%
Registered electors		192,421		
DMK hold		Swing	-5.23%	

=== 1984 ===
1984 Tamil Nadu Legislative Assembly election: Perur
Party	Candidate	Votes	%	±%
DMK	A. Natarajan	58,302	52.63%	5.09%
AIADMK	K. Marudasalam	51,241	46.26%	−1.78%
Independent	M. Nithyanandam	452	0.41%	
Independent	N. Devadass	319	0.29%	
Independent	M. Senni	233	0.21%	
Independent	M. Jayaraj	124	0.11%	
Independent	M. A. Kandaswamy Gounder	103	0.09%	
Margin of victory		7,061	6.37%	5.88%
Turnout		110,774	72.22%	5.63%
Registered electors		161,164		
DMK gain from AIADMK		Swing	4.60%	

=== 1980 ===
1980 Tamil Nadu Legislative Assembly election: Perur
Party	Candidate	Votes	%	±%
AIADMK	Kovaithambi	47,308	48.04%	
DMK	A. Natarajan	46,823	47.54%	13.81%
JP	E. M. Palanisami	4,355	4.42%	
Margin of victory		485	0.49%	−2.78%
Turnout		98,486	66.59%	3.04%
Registered electors		149,766		
AIADMK gain from DMK		Swing	14.30%	

=== 1977 ===
1977 Tamil Nadu Legislative Assembly election: Perur
Party	Candidate	Votes	%	±%
DMK	A. Natarajan	29,158	33.74%	
CPI(M)	M. Nanjappan	26,328	30.46%	
CPI	Mylswamy	15,415	17.84%	
JP	P. S. Chinndurai	14,539	16.82%	
Independent	A. Palanisamy	343	0.40%	
Independent	A. P. Raju	335	0.39%	
Independent	A. Palaniswamy	203	0.23%	
Independent	S. D. Singaravelu	108	0.12%	
Margin of victory		2,830	3.27%	−23.11%
Turnout		86,429	63.55%	−1.59%
Registered electors		137,887		
DMK gain from CPI		Swing	-23.95%	

=== 1971 ===
1971 Tamil Nadu Legislative Assembly election: Perur
Party	Candidate	Votes	%	±%
CPI	N. Marudachalam	39,270	57.68%	
INC	K. P. Palanisami	21,307	31.30%	−6.03%
CPI(M)	K. Karamadai	7,503	11.02%	
Margin of victory		17,963	26.39%	2.22%
Turnout		68,080	65.14%	−10.12%
Registered electors		109,573		
CPI gain from CPI(M)		Swing	-3.81%	

=== 1967 ===
1967 Madras Legislative Assembly election: Perur
Party	Candidate	Votes	%	±%
CPI(M)	N. Marudachalam	43,740	61.49%	
INC	R. Rayappan	26,548	37.32%	
Independent	V. Narayanasami	842	1.18%	
Margin of victory		17,192	24.17%	
Turnout		71,130	75.26%	
Registered electors		97,801		
CPI(M) win (new seat)				
