= M. P. Periaswami =

Indian politician

M. P. Periaswami was an Indian politician and a former Member of the Legislative Assembly of Tamil Nadu. He was elected to the Tamil Nadu legislative assembly as an Indian National Congress candidate from Namakkal constituency in 1952 and 1957 elections. He was one of the winners from that constituency in both elections.
