= Varahur Assembly constituency =

Constituency in Tamil Nadu, India

Coordinates: 11.25°N 79.04°E

Varahur
- Former constituency for the Tamil Nadu Legislative Assembly

Constituency details
- Country: India
- Region: South India
- State: Tamil Nadu
- District: Perambalur
- Lok Sabha constituency: Perambalur
- Established: 1971
- Abolished: 2008
- Total electors: 160,287
- Reservation: SC

Varahur, also spelled Varagur, is a state assembly constituency in Perambalur district in Tamil Nadu. It is a Scheduled Caste reserved constituency. It is one of the 234 State Legislative Assembly Constituencies in Tamil Nadu, in India.

== Members of the Legislative Assembly ==
| Year | Winner | Party |
|---|---|---|
| 1967 | R. Narayanan | Dravida Munnetra Kazhagam |
| 1971 | K. Palanivelan | Dravida Munnetra Kazhagam |
| 1977 | N. Perumal | All India Anna Dravida Munnetra Kazhagam |
| 1980 | N. Perumal | All India Anna Dravida Munnetra Kazhagam |
| 1984 | A. Arunachalam | All India Anna Dravida Munnetra Kazhagam |
| 1989 | K. Annadurai | Dravida Munnetra Kazhagam |
| 1991 | E. T. Ponnuvelu | All India Anna Dravida Munnetra Kazhagam |
| 1996 | B. Duraisamy | Dravida Munnetra Kazhagam |
| 2001 | A. Arunachalam | All India Anna Dravida Munnetra Kazhagam |
| 2006 | M. Chandrakasi | All India Anna Dravida Munnetra Kazhagam |

== Election results ==
Vote share of winning candidates
| 2006 | 43.60% |
| 2001 | 52.76% |
| 1996 | 51.97% |
| 1991 | 57.70% |
| 1989 | 43.05% |
| 1984 | 56.92% |
| 1980 | 53.27% |
| 1977 | 52.39% |
| 1971 | 58.91% |
| 1967 | 49.64% |

=== 2006 ===
2006 Tamil Nadu Legislative Assembly election: Varahur
| Party | Candidate | Votes | % | ±% |
|---|---|---|---|---|
| AIADMK | M. Chandrakasi | 52,815 | 43.60% | −9.17% |
| PMK | K. Gopala Krishnan | 50,272 | 41.50% | |
| DMDK | M. Ganapathi | 10,303 | 8.50% | |
| Independent | P. Jeeva | 3,188 | 2.63% | |
| Independent | P. Sakthivel | 2,030 | 1.68% | |
| BSP | R. Chellasamy | 1,098 | 0.91% | −0.44% |
| BJP | D. Periasamy | 824 | 0.68% | |
| LJP | M. Palanimuthu | 618 | 0.51% | |
| Margin of victory | | 2,543 | 2.10% | −9.91% |
| Turnout | | 121,148 | 75.58% | 10.73% |
| Registered electors | | 160,287 | | |
| AIADMK hold | | Swing | -9.17% | |

=== 2001 ===
2001 Tamil Nadu Legislative Assembly election: Varahur
| Party | Candidate | Votes | % | ±% |
|---|---|---|---|---|
| AIADMK | A. Arunachalam | 61,064 | 52.76% | 20.40% |
| DMK | K. Thiruvalluvan | 47,160 | 40.75% | −11.22% |
| MDMK | R. Palanimuthu | 3,278 | 2.83% | |
| JD(U) | P. Kalyana Sundaram | 2,667 | 2.30% | |
| BSP | P. Rajendiran | 1,562 | 1.35% | |
| Margin of victory | | 13,904 | 12.01% | −7.59% |
| Turnout | | 115,731 | 64.85% | −4.93% |
| Registered electors | | 178,455 | | |
| AIADMK gain from DMK | | Swing | 0.80% | |

=== 1996 ===
1996 Tamil Nadu Legislative Assembly election: Varahur
| Party | Candidate | Votes | % | ±% |
|---|---|---|---|---|
| DMK | B. Duraisamy | 56,076 | 51.97% | 21.69% |
| AIADMK | A. Palanimuthu | 34,925 | 32.37% | −25.34% |
| PMK | J. Sivagnanamani | 11,487 | 10.65% | |
| Independent | A. Gandhi | 2,408 | 2.23% | |
| JD | M. Palanimuthu | 2,015 | 1.87% | |
| JP | P. Kamaraj | 399 | 0.37% | |
| Independent | M. Ganapathy | 209 | 0.19% | |
| Independent | P. Subramanian | 195 | 0.18% | |
| Independent | R. Ramalingam | 195 | 0.18% | |
| Margin of victory | | 21,151 | 19.60% | −7.83% |
| Turnout | | 107,909 | 69.78% | 1.46% |
| Registered electors | | 164,523 | | |
| DMK gain from AIADMK | | Swing | -5.74% | |

=== 1991 ===
1991 Tamil Nadu Legislative Assembly election: Varahur
| Party | Candidate | Votes | % | ±% |
|---|---|---|---|---|
| AIADMK | E. T. Ponnuvelu | 59,384 | 57.70% | 23.36% |
| DMK | C. Thiyagarajan | 31,155 | 30.27% | −12.78% |
| PMK | N. Perumal | 11,870 | 11.53% | |
| THMM | P. Venuraju | 501 | 0.49% | |
| Margin of victory | | 28,229 | 27.43% | 18.72% |
| Turnout | | 102,910 | 68.32% | 5.88% |
| Registered electors | | 155,654 | | |
| AIADMK gain from DMK | | Swing | 14.65% | |

=== 1989 ===
1989 Tamil Nadu Legislative Assembly election: Varahur
| Party | Candidate | Votes | % | ±% |
|---|---|---|---|---|
| DMK | K. Annadurai | 36,219 | 43.05% | 0.60% |
| AIADMK | E. T. Ponnuvelu | 28,895 | 34.35% | −22.57% |
| AIADMK | A. Arunachalam | 8,507 | 10.11% | −46.81% |
| INC | A. Seppan | 8,450 | 10.04% | |
| Independent | M. Thangavelu | 985 | 1.17% | |
| Independent | M. Palanimuthu | 424 | 0.50% | |
| Independent | P. Panneerselvam | 362 | 0.43% | |
| Independent | P. Thangavelu | 284 | 0.34% | |
| Margin of victory | | 7,324 | 8.71% | −5.76% |
| Turnout | | 84,126 | 62.44% | −11.18% |
| Registered electors | | 137,998 | | |
| DMK gain from AIADMK | | Swing | -13.87% | |

=== 1984 ===
1984 Tamil Nadu Legislative Assembly election: Varahur
| Party | Candidate | Votes | % | ±% |
|---|---|---|---|---|
| AIADMK | A. Arunachalam | 50,012 | 56.92% | 3.65% |
| DMK | K. Kanaga Sabai | 37,302 | 42.45% | |
| Independent | K. Sundararajan | 551 | 0.63% | |
| Margin of victory | | 12,710 | 14.47% | 6.10% |
| Turnout | | 87,865 | 73.62% | 9.50% |
| Registered electors | | 123,134 | | |
| AIADMK hold | | Swing | 3.65% | |

=== 1980 ===
1980 Tamil Nadu Legislative Assembly election: Varahur
| Party | Candidate | Votes | % | ±% |
|---|---|---|---|---|
| AIADMK | N. Perumal | 39,476 | 53.27% | 0.88% |
| INC | P. Chinnaian | 33,277 | 44.90% | 40.03% |
| JP | P. Kathamuthu | 921 | 1.24% | |
| Independent | M. Ganapathi | 436 | 0.59% | |
| Margin of victory | | 6,199 | 8.36% | −9.24% |
| Turnout | | 74,110 | 64.12% | 2.14% |
| Registered electors | | 117,112 | | |
| AIADMK hold | | Swing | 0.88% | |

=== 1977 ===
1977 Tamil Nadu Legislative Assembly election: Varahur
| Party | Candidate | Votes | % | ±% |
|---|---|---|---|---|
| AIADMK | N. Perumal | 36,023 | 52.39% | |
| DMK | K. Kanagasabai | 23,919 | 34.79% | −24.12% |
| JP | M. Ganapathy | 4,791 | 6.97% | |
| INC | P. K. Ramasamy | 3,348 | 4.87% | −31.03% |
| Independent | A. Krishnan | 676 | 0.98% | |
| Margin of victory | | 12,104 | 17.60% | −5.40% |
| Turnout | | 68,757 | 61.99% | −15.94% |
| Registered electors | | 112,363 | | |
| AIADMK gain from DMK | | Swing | -6.52% | |

=== 1971 ===
1971 Tamil Nadu Legislative Assembly election: Varahur
| Party | Candidate | Votes | % | ±% |
|---|---|---|---|---|
| DMK | K. Palanivelan | 42,733 | 58.91% | 9.27% |
| INC | K. C. Periyasamy | 26,043 | 35.90% | 4.87% |
| Independent | M. Perumal | 3,762 | 5.19% | |
| Margin of victory | | 16,690 | 23.01% | 4.40% |
| Turnout | | 72,538 | 77.93% | −0.51% |
| Registered electors | | 97,516 | | |
| DMK hold | | Swing | 9.27% | |

=== 1967 ===
1967 Madras Legislative Assembly election: Varahur
| Party | Candidate | Votes | % | ±% |
|---|---|---|---|---|
| DMK | R. Narayanan | 32,846 | 49.64% | |
| INC | M. V. Perumal | 20,533 | 31.03% | |
| Independent | R. Udayar | 9,230 | 13.95% | |
| Independent | Palanimuthu | 2,173 | 3.28% | |
| Independent | Krishnan | 1,387 | 2.10% | |
| Margin of victory | | 12,313 | 18.61% | |
| Turnout | | 66,169 | 78.44% | |
| Registered electors | | 90,182 | | |
| DMK win (new seat) | | | | |
