= A. Natarajan =

Indian politician

A. Natarajan was an Indian politician and Member of the Legislative Assembly of Tamil Nadu. He was elected to the Tamil Nadu legislative assembly as a Dravida Munnetra Kazhagam candidate from Perur constituency in the 1977, 1984, 1989 and 1996 elections.

Natarajan, who was also a trade union leader, was not nominated by the DMK to contest the 2001 elections. This decision caused some resentment among party members.

He died on 13 June 2017.
