= G. Rangothaman =

Member of the Madras
- In office 1977–1980
- Preceded by: A. G. Padmavathi
- Succeeded by: R. Sundaramurthy
- Constituency: Mugaiyur

Personal details
- Born: 20 June 1939 Marungiyur
- Party: All India Anna Dravida Munnetra Kazhagam
- Profession: Farmer

G. Rangothaman (born 20 June 1939) is an Indian politician and a former member of the Tamil Nadu Legislative Assembly. He hails from Marungiyur village in the Villupuram district. He studied at the Government Higher Secondary School in Vettavalam. He is affiliated with the All India Anna Dravida Munnetra Kazhagam (AIADMK). In the 1977 Tamil Nadu Legislative Assembly election, he was elected as a Member of the Legislative Assembly from the Mugaiyur constituency.

== Electoral Performance ==
=== 1977 ===
1977 Tamil Nadu Legislative Assembly election: Mugaiyur
Party	Candidate	Votes	%	±%
AIADMK	G. Rangothaman	31,531	45.74%	
DMK	M. Shanmugam	18,248	26.47%	−33.51%
JP	P. G. Krishnaswamy	12,012	17.43%	
INC	G. Janakiraman	4,970	7.21%	−23.14%
Independent	I. Elumalai	834	1.21%	
Independent	S. Pandurangan	740	1.07%	
Independent	T. S. Mohamad Usman	598	0.87%	
Margin of victory		13,283	19.27%	−10.36%
Turnout		68,933	64.87%	−7.60%
Registered electors		108,393		
AIADMK gain from DMK		Swing	-14.24%	
