= R. Leema Rose =

Indian politician

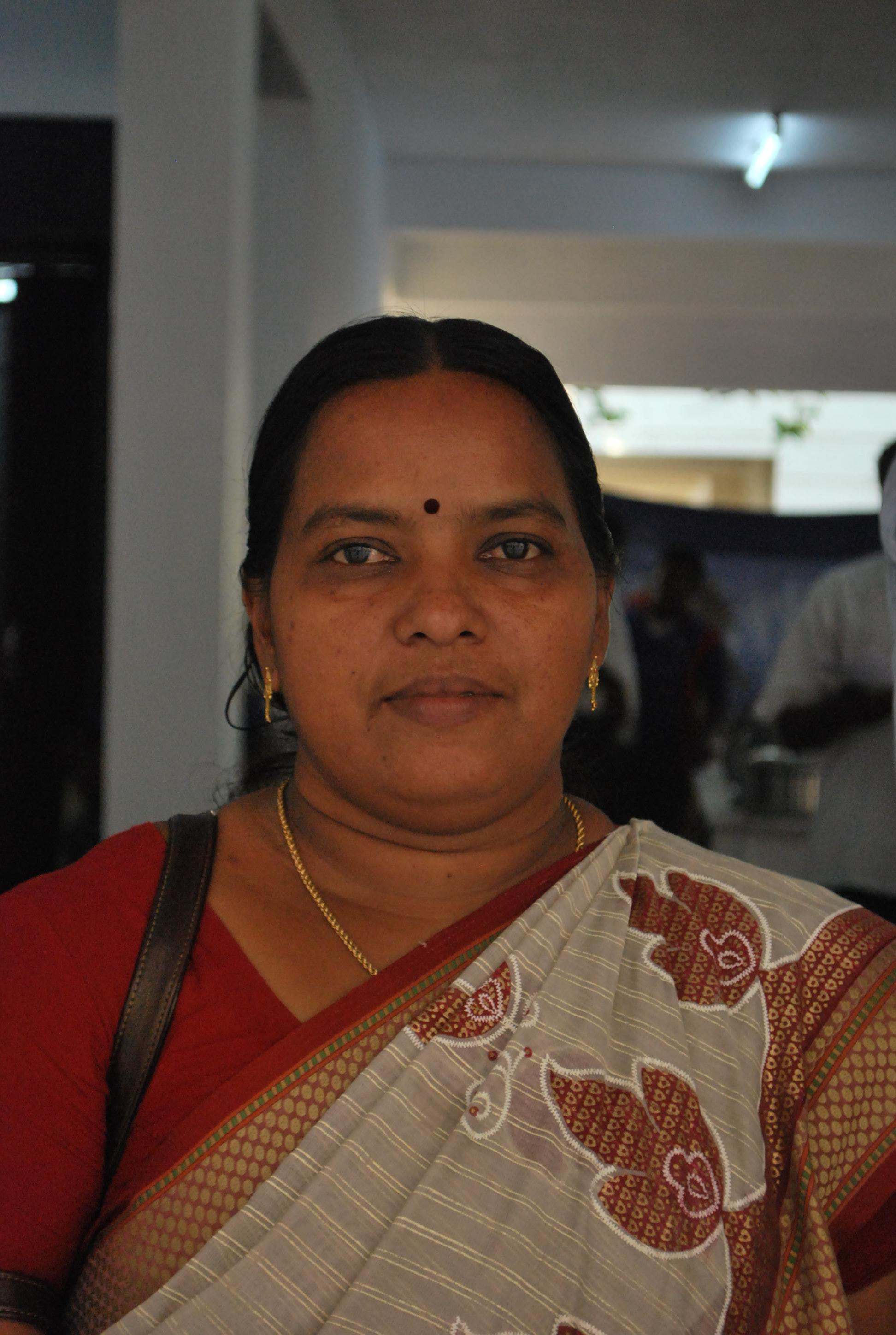
Leemarose

R. Leema Rose is an Indian politician and a previous Member of the Legislative Assembly. She was elected to the Tamil Nadu legislative assembly as a Communist Party of India (Marxist) candidate from Thiruvattar constituency in Kanyakumari district in 2006 election.
