= J. James (politician) =

Indian politician

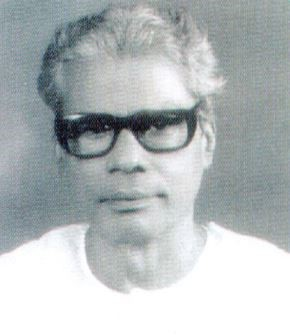

Member of the Madras State Assembly
- In office 1967 - 1971; 1971 - 1976; 1977 - 1982
- Constituency: Thiruvattar constituency
- In office 1967–1972
- Constituency: Thiruvattar constituency

Personal details
- Born: Palliyadi, South Travancore (Travancore Kingdom), Present-day Tamil Nadu, India
- Party: Indian National Congress

J. James was a veteran Indian politician and a three time Member of the Legislative Assembly hailing from Palliyadi. He was elected to the Tamil Nadu legislative assembly as an Indian National Congress candidate from Thiruvattar constituency in 1967 election and as an Indian National Congress (Organisation) candidate in 1971 election and as a Janata Party candidate 1977 election.

== Other activities ==
After retiring from active politics, he served as the Correspondent of the prestigious Nesamony Memorial Christian College
