= Thiruvattar Assembly constituency =

Former assembly constituency in Tamil Nadu, India

Coordinates: 8.33°N 77.27°E

Thiruvattar
- Former constituency for the Tamil Nadu Legislative Assembly

Constituency details
- Country: India
- Region: South India
- State: Tamil Nadu
- District: Kanniyakumari
- Lok Sabha constituency: Kanniyakumari
- Established: 1951
- Abolished: 2008
- Total electors: 165,801 (2006)
- Reservation: None

Thiruvattar was an assembly constituency located in Nagercoil Lok Sabha constituency in Kanyakumari district in Tamil Nadu.

== Members of the Legislative Assembly ==
Year	Winner	Party
Travancore-cochin
1952	P. Ramasamy Pillai	Tamil Nadu Congress
1954	P. Ramasamy Pillai	Tamil Nadu Congress
Madras State
1967	J. James	Indian National Congress
Tamil Nadu
1971	J. James	Indian National Congress
1977	J. James	Janata Party
1980	J. Hemachandran	Communist Party of India (Marxist)
1984	J. Hemachandran	Communist Party of India (Marxist)
1989	R. Nadesan	Indian National Congress
1991	R. Nadesan	Indian National Congress
1996-1999	V. Alban	Dravida Munnetra Kazhagam
1999-2001	J. Hemachandran	Communist Party of India (Marxist)
2001	J. Hemachandran	Communist Party of India (Marxist)
2006	R. Leema Rose	Communist Party of India (Marxist)

== Election results ==
=== 2006 ===
2006 Tamil Nadu Legislative Assembly election: Thiruvattar
Party	Candidate	Votes	%	±%
CPI(M)	R. Leema Rose	57,162	51.60%	1.55%
BJP	G. Sujith Kumar	29,112	26.28%	−3.36%
AIADMK	P. C. N. Thilak Kumar	13,363	12.06%	
DMDK	D. Jeganathan	9,431	8.51%	
Independent	N. S. Moni	1,024	0.92%	
BSP	R. Meena	683	0.62%	
Margin of victory		28,050	25.32%	4.91%
Turnout		110,775	66.81%	10.28%
Registered electors		165,801		
CPI(M) hold		Swing	1.55%	

=== 2001 ===
2001 Tamil Nadu Legislative Assembly election: Thiruvattar
Party	Candidate	Votes	%	±%
CPI(M)	J. Hemachandran	47,807	50.06%	22.40%
BJP	P. Rajamony	28,310	29.64%	6.36%
Independent	R. Appu Nadesan	14,948	15.65%	
NCP	K. Issac	2,142	2.24%	
Independent	V. Haarris	900	0.94%	
Independent	D. Thomas	897	0.94%	
Independent	S. Sasikumar	503	0.53%	
Margin of victory		19,497	20.41%	6.84%
Turnout		95,507	56.53%	−5.36%
Registered electors		169,027		
CPI(M) gain from DMK		Swing	8.82%	

=== 1996 ===
1996 Tamil Nadu Legislative Assembly election: Thiruvattar
Party	Candidate	Votes	%	±%
DMK	V. Alban	37,523	41.23%	
CPI(M)	J. Hemachandran	25,169	27.66%	−4.20%
BJP	R. Manmadan	21,192	23.29%	6.66%
AIIC(T)	A. Wilson	4,720	5.19%	
Independent	K. Pal Nadar	735	0.81%	
Independent	C. Selvadhas	378	0.42%	
Independent	P. Kasi	226	0.25%	
Independent	D. Leela Sundaram	225	0.25%	
Independent	S. N. Pushkaran	221	0.24%	
Independent	M. Christu Dhas	191	0.21%	
Independent	T. Vargsee	140	0.15%	
Margin of victory		12,354	13.58%	−5.06%
Turnout		91,005	61.88%	−0.05%
Registered electors		154,690		
DMK gain from INC		Swing	-9.26%	

=== 1991 ===
1991 Tamil Nadu Legislative Assembly election: Thiruvattar
Party	Candidate	Votes	%	±%
INC	R. Nadesan	45,591	50.49%	5.13%
CPI(M)	J. Hemachandran	28,762	31.86%	−4.13%
BJP	M. G. Retna Sabapathy	15,015	16.63%	
Independent	T. Wilson	358	0.40%	
THMM	M. Udayakumar	266	0.29%	
PMK	P. K. Haridas	209	0.23%	
Independent	Y. John Gnananamuthu	88	0.10%	
Margin of victory		16,829	18.64%	9.25%
Turnout		90,289	61.93%	−5.60%
Registered electors		149,139		
INC hold		Swing	5.13%	

=== 1989 ===
1989 Tamil Nadu Legislative Assembly election: Thiruvattar
Party	Candidate	Votes	%	±%
INC	R. Nadesan	39,193	45.37%	
CPI(M)	J. Hemachandran	31,084	35.98%	−0.99%
Independent	S. Lucase	14,655	16.96%	
AIADMK	G. Radhakrishnan	832	0.96%	
Independent	S. Nesayyan	245	0.28%	
Independent	V. Madhusoodhanan Nair	228	0.26%	
Independent	C. Henry	154	0.18%	
Margin of victory		8,109	9.39%	3.76%
Turnout		86,391	67.54%	−2.40%
Registered electors		129,184		
INC gain from CPI(M)		Swing	8.40%	

=== 1984 ===
1984 Tamil Nadu Legislative Assembly election: Thiruvattar
Party	Candidate	Votes	%	±%
CPI(M)	J. Hemachandran	26,851	36.97%	−10.74%
Independent	M. Mohndahs	22,762	31.34%	
Independent	N. Thilakkumar	19,847	27.33%	
GKC	S. Natarajan	3,167	4.36%	
Margin of victory		4,089	5.63%	−14.39%
Turnout		72,627	69.94%	8.38%
Registered electors		110,731		
CPI(M) hold		Swing	-10.74%	

=== 1980 ===
1980 Tamil Nadu Legislative Assembly election: Thiruvattar
Party	Candidate	Votes	%	±%
CPI(M)	J. Hemachandran	29,463	47.71%	1.73%
INC	P. Thobias	17,099	27.69%	24.59%
JP	J. James	14,970	24.24%	
Independent	P. Thomas Marshall	225	0.36%	
Margin of victory		12,364	20.02%	17.18%
Turnout		61,757	61.55%	1.97%
Registered electors		101,139		
CPI(M) gain from JP		Swing	-1.12%	

=== 1977 ===
1977 Tamil Nadu Legislative Assembly election: Thiruvattar
Party	Candidate	Votes	%	±%
JP	J. James	27,812	48.82%	
CPI(M)	J. Hemachandran	26,192	45.98%	
INC	A. J. Raj	1,764	3.10%	−56.57%
Independent	N. Sukumarran	984	1.73%	
DMK	S. Gladstone	212	0.37%	−16.30%
Margin of victory		1,620	2.84%	−33.16%
Turnout		56,964	59.58%	−7.20%
Registered electors		96,167		
JP gain from INC		Swing	-10.84%	

=== 1971 ===
1971 Tamil Nadu Legislative Assembly election: Thiruvattar
Party	Candidate	Votes	%	±%
INC	James. J	36,097	59.66%	5.20%
CPI(M)	J. Hemachandran	14,315	23.66%	
DMK	N. Gnanasigamony	10,088	16.67%	
Margin of victory		21,782	36.00%	20.98%
Turnout		60,500	66.78%	−7.29%
Registered electors		93,019		
INC hold		Swing	5.20%	

=== 1967 ===
1967 Madras Legislative Assembly election: Thiruvattar
Party	Candidate	Votes	%	±%
INC	J. James	29,345	54.47%	
CPI(M)	D. Gnanasingamoni	21,253	39.45%	
Independent	P. Thobias	3,277	6.08%	
Margin of victory		8,092	15.02%	
Turnout		53,875	74.07%	
Registered electors		75,416		
INC win (new seat)				

=== 1954 ===
1954 Travancore-Cochin Legislative Assembly election: Thiruvattar
Party	Candidate	Votes	%	±%
TTNC	P. Ramasamy Pillai	18,104	88.91%	
INC	Pakianathan	2,258	11.09%	11.09%
Margin of victory		15,846	77.82%	18.07%
Turnout		20,362	56.50%	
Registered electors		36,041		
TTNC hold		Swing		

=== 1952 ===
1952 Travancore-Cochin Legislative Assembly election: Thiruvattar
Party	Candidate	Votes	%	±%
TTNC	P. Ramasamy Pillai	18,244	68.13%	
	S. Kulandaswami	2,242	8.37%	
Independent	V. Sreedharan Pillai	1,889	7.05%	
INC	J. T. Raj	1,840	6.87%	6.87%
Independent	N. Padmanabhan	1,437	5.37%	
TTP	D. Thankakon	1,127	4.21%	
Margin of victory		16,002	59.76%	59.76%
Turnout		26,779	67.61%	
Registered electors		39,609		
TTNC win (new seat)				
