= P. Ramalingam =

Indian politician

P.Ramalingam

Member of the Tamil Nadu Legislative Assembly
- In office 12 May 2021 – 04 May 2026
- Preceded by: K.P.P. Baskar
- Succeeded by: C.S.Dilip
- Constituency: Namakkal

Personal details
- Party: Dravida Munnetra Kazhagam

P.Ramalingam is an Indian politician who is a Member of Legislative Assembly of Tamil Nadu. He was elected from Namakkal as a Dravida Munnetra Kazhagamcandidate in 2021.

== Elections contested ==
Election	Constituency	Party	Result	Vote %	Runner-up	Runner-up Party	Runner-up vote %	Ref.
2021 Tamil Nadu Legislative Assembly election	Namakkal	Dravida Munnetra Kazhagam	Won	51.83	K.P.P.Baskar	ADMK	38.27	
