= A. Arunachalam =

Indian politician

- Occupation: Politician

A. Arunachalam is an Indian politician of the Anna Dravida Munnetra Kazhagam and a former Member of the Legislative Assembly of Tamil Nadu. He served as the Deputy Speaker of the Tamil Nadu Legislative Assembly from 2001 to 2006.

He was elected to the Tamil Nadu legislative assembly as an Anna Dravida Munnetra Kazhagam candidate from the Varahur constituency in the 1984 and 2001 elections.
