= P. Duraisamy =

Indian politician

P. Duraisamy is an Indian politician and former Member of the Legislative Assembly of Tamil Nadu. He was elected to the Tamil Nadu legislative assembly as an Anna Dravida Munnetra Kazhagam candidate from Rasipuram constituency in 1977 election and a Dravida Munnetra Kazhagam candidate from Namakkal constituency in 1989 election.
