= B. Duraisamy =

Indian politician

B. Duraisamy is an Indian politician and former Member of the Legislative Assembly (MLA) of Tamil Nadu. He was elected to the Tamil Nadu legislative assembly from Varahur constituency as a Dravida Munnetra Kazhagam (DMK) candidate in the 1996 elections. The constituency was reserved for candidates from the Scheduled Castes.
