= J. Hemachandran =

Indian politician

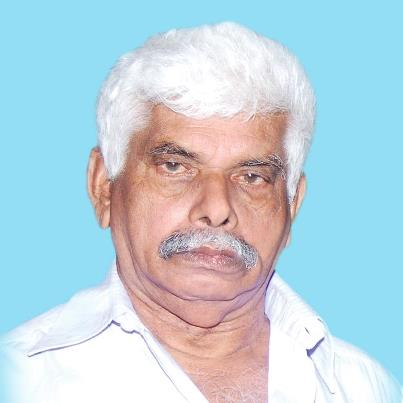

J. Hemachandran (10 November 1932, in Thiruvattar 8 February 2008, in Thiruvananthapuram) was an Indian politician and trade unionist. He was a leading personality of the Communist Party of India (Marxist) in the state of Tamil Nadu. He was elected to the Legislative Assembly of Tamil Nadu from the Thiruvattar constituency four times, in 1980, 1984, 1989 and 2001. He served as the leader of the CPI(M) group in the Assembly.

During his college studies in Thiruvananthapuram, J. Hemachandran had become active in student politics. In 1952 he was admitted as a member of the Communist Party of India. He returned to Tamil Nadu and became a full-time activist of the party in Nagercoil in 1962. He began to work with plantation workers. When the CPI was divided in 1964, J. Hemachandran sided with the Communist Party of India (Marxist). In the same year he was arrested under DIR and was imprisoned during fourteen months.

When the Centre of Indian Trade Unions was formed, he became a leading figure of the organisation in the state. He led struggles of coir, textile, plantation workers, amongst other. He was district secretary and later state secretary of the CITU Transport Workers' Federation. He would also become Vice President of the All India Plantation Workers Federation.

In 1978 he was elected to the CPI(M) Tamil Nadu State Committee, and in 2005 he was included in the Tamil Nadu state secretariat of the party. During the 1990s he was elected President of the Tamil Nadu State Committee of CITU. He was also a member of the National Rubber Board.

Amongst other things, J. Hemachandran campaigned for a ban on Coca-Cola and Pepsi sales in Tamil Nadu and coordinated relief work in the state after the 2004 tsunami.

J. Hemachandran died after surgery (a tumour in the spinal cord had been removed) at a Thiruvananthapuram hospital on 8 February 2008.
