= S. Anbalagan =

Indian politician

S. Anbalagan is a politician from All India Anna Dravida Munnetra Kazhagam (AMMK) party, former member of the Parliament of India representing Tamil Nadu in the Rajya Sabha, the upper house of the Indian Parliament. He currently serves as the vice-president of the AMMK.
