= A. G. Sampath =

Indian politician

A. G. Sampath is an Indian politician and former Member of the Legislative Assembly of Tamil Nadu. He was elected to the Tamil Nadu legislative assembly from Mugaiyur constituency as a Dravida Munnetra Kazhagam (DMK) candidate in the 1989 and 1996 elections.

Sampath resigned from the DMK in April 2006 in protest of the party's electoral pact causing the Mugaiyur constituency to be allocated to the Pattali Makkal Katchi (PMK) for the elections of that year. The seat had previously been won twice by his mother, A. G. Padmavathi, and also by his father, A. Govindasamy.
