= K. P. P. Baskar =

Indian politician

K. P. P. Baskar is an Indian politician and incumbent member of the 15th Tamil Nadu Legislative Assembly from the Namakkal constituency. He was previously elected to the 14th Tamil Nadu Legislative Assembly. He represents the All India Anna Dravida Munnetra Kazhagam party.
