= R. Nadesan =

Indian politician

R. Nadesan (Appu Nadesan) was an Indian politician and former Member of the Legislative Assembly.Date of Birth :- 02-02-1939(81 Years). He was elected to the Tamil Nadu legislative assembly as an Indian National Congress candidate from Thiruvattar constituency in 1989 and 1991 elections. Founder (1960) Sri Krishna swami temple, Kulasekharam. Founder of Sree Rama Krishna group of institutions.

1.SRKBV Matriculation Higher Secondary School, Kulasekharam.http://srkbvschool.com/

2.Sree Ramakrishna Medical college of Naturopathy and yogic sciences, Kulasekharam.(http://naturopathyindia.edu.in/)http://www.medipark.org.in/

3.Sree Ramakrishna college of Nursing, Kulasekharam

4. S.R.K.International School, Kulasekharam.http://srkins.edu.in/
