= L. A. Govindaraghava Aiyar =

Indian lawyer, theosophist, Indian independence activist and politician

Diwan Bahadur Lalpet Arunachala Govindaraghava Aiyar (1867-1935) was an Indian lawyer, theosophist, Indian independence activist and politician.

== Early life and education ==
Govindaraghava Aiyar was born in the town of Chittoor. He graduated in arts and studied law from Madras Law College. Govindaraghava Aiyar became a non-officiating member of the Madras Legislative Council on January 9, 1903.

In 1911, Govindaraghava Aiyar was made judge of the Madras High Court and served from 1911 to 1931. He also served as Vice-President of the Madras Mahajana Sabha and was elected President of the National Liberal Federation in 1921. Govindaraghava Aiyar was one of the trustees of Pachaiyappa's College from 1911 to 1918.

== Honours ==
Govindaraghava Aiyar was given the title Diwan Bahadur in 1906.
