= S. M. Raju =

Indian civil servant

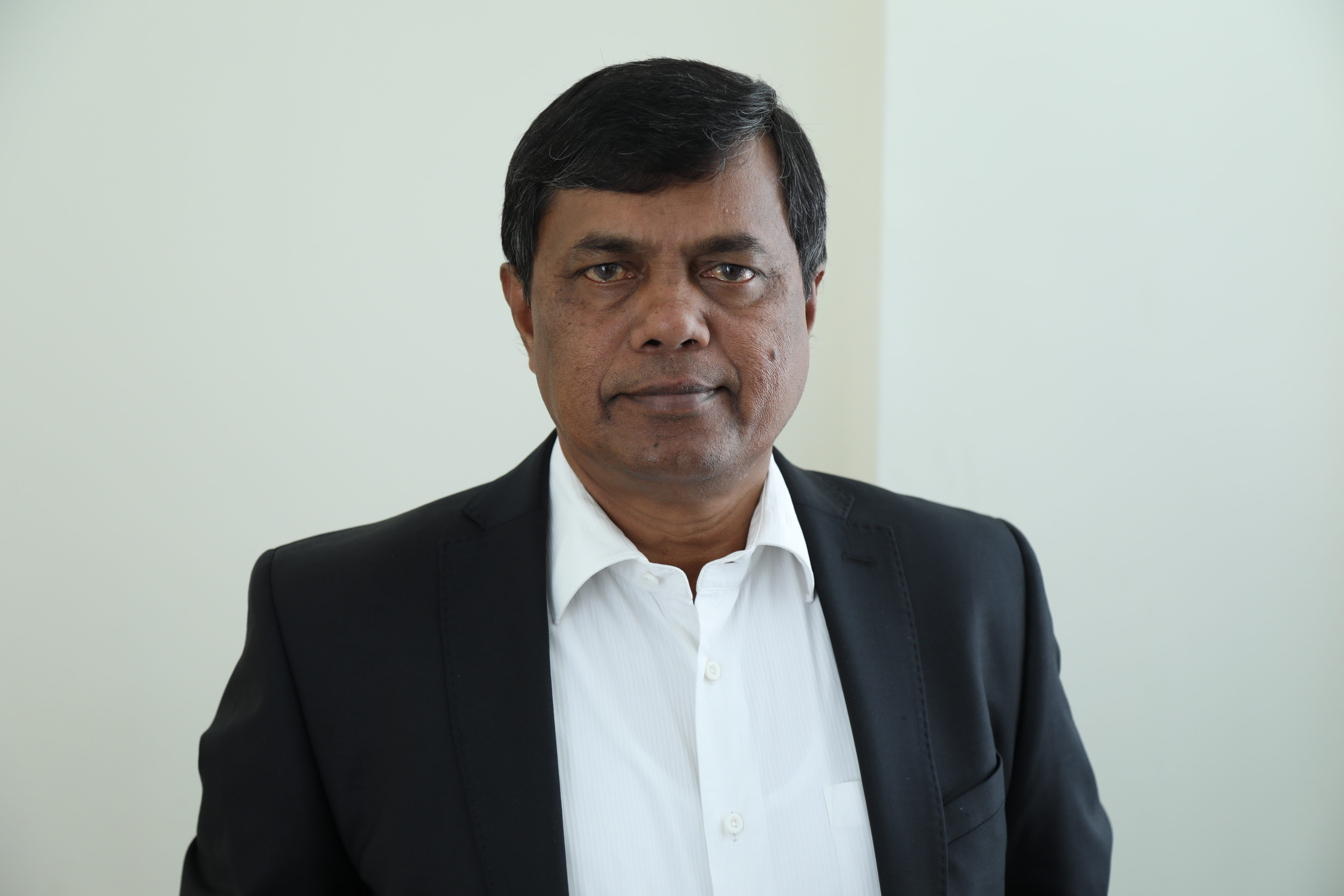
- Born: Sultanpet Munilakkappa Raju; 3 July 1960 (age 66)
- Education: University of Agricultural Sciences, Bangalore
- Occupation: Indian Administrative Service

S. M. Raju is a civil servant working for Bihar Government.

He was formerly posted as Principal Secretary, Govt. of Bihar, India. He introduced innovations in the field of poverty elimination through social forestry at the bottom line of economic pyramid in rural Bihar. He also integrated the Indian government's rural employment scheme (NREGA) to forest development.

Raju served the state of Bihar for the last 18 years. He hails from the state of Karnataka is an Agriculture Science graduate.

Raju was born in a village called Sultanpet, Chikkaballapur District (Karnataka, India) on 3 July 1960 in a family of farmers. His father's name is Munilakkappa and as he hails from the village of Sultanpet, he was christened Sultanpet Munilakkappa Raju (S.M.Raju).

== Achievements ==
Raju's work led to an increase in environment related consciousness in the government of Bihar, which has earmarked a sum of Rs. 7 billion (Approximately 150 million US dollars) for this project for a period of three years. Rural Bihar underwent an extreme level of depletion of forest cover in the last fifty years, resulting in massive level of drought and flood in the past decades.

His past achievements include the redevelopment of Mahabodhi temple and its precincts in Bodh Gaya as the District Magistrate of Gaya in the late 90s. It is believed that Gautama Buddha received enlightenment there. The project was supported by the Overseas Economic Co-operative Fund, Bihar. Through the efforts of Raju, the temple complex received world heritage monument recognition by UNESCO.

=== Social Forestry ===
Bihar has been one of the most underdeveloped states in India. It is ravaged by floods in the North and by droughts in the south. It also has a very high density of population with more than 50% of the people living below the poverty line – this leads to most of the people migrating to other states in search of menial jobs. As such, Bihar comprises 5443 km^{2}. of wastelands which consist of degraded, waterlogged and marshy lands. This region poses enormous challenges of growth in lieu of the natural calamities of floods and droughts. The state of Bihar has been divided into 9 divisions, this project has been executed in 4 divisions as of now, viz. – Tirhut, Saran, Magadh and Munger.

As the Secretary of Rural Development Department, Government of Bihar, he conceived this concept in Social Forestry/Agro forestry policy to provide sustainable employment for 100 days for old age persons, handicapped people and women (who are incapable of earth-cutting) under the MNREGA scheme (National Rural Employment Guarantee Programme, Government of India).

This new concept is one of the most innovative forestry schemes involving several communities, wherein 4 families are tied up with 200 plants. These families are provided with sustainable employment for 100 days for 5 years for maintaining these trees. This new concept has transformed the protection and maintenance of the plants by replacing the "Iron Gabion" to "Human gabion". This initiative also focuses on horticulture plantation which provides solutions to underprivileged families who are unable to acquire nutritional food.

As the Divisional Commissioner of the Tirhut Division, Muzaffarpur, Bihar, he took the lead by planting 9.64 million plants (Approx. 1 crore) in a single day on 30 August 2009. This was further nominated for the Guinness Book of World Records. Mr. Raju inspired MNREGA functionary across Bihar to plant millions of saplings.

As the Divisional Commissioner of Saran Division, Saran, Bihar, he took the lead by planting 1.2 million plans in 2011–2012, and as the Divisional Commissioner of Munger Division, Munger, Bihar, he took the lead by planting 1 million saplings in a single day on 25 March 2012.

As the secretary of Rural Development Department, Government of Bihar, he designed the facilitator model for plantations and under his leadership, the forest cover of Bihar increased for 6.87% to more than 10%.

Over the last 7 years, this project has been successful in the plantation of 5 crore saplings (50 million) which has provided sustainable employment to 10 lakh families (1 million). These plants have already started bearing fruits, hence providing new sources of income and nutrition to underprivileged families.

This project has been supported, evaluated and appreciated by multiple agencies; viz. Chief Minister of Bihar, BBC, The Telegraph and The National institute of Administrative Research. Also, the Lal Bahadur Shastri Academy of Administration conducted a National level peer-learning workshop in 2010 based on this project.

The tree plantation initiative in Bihar and his leadership skills has been highlighted in the book "Target 3 Billion" by the Late President of India Dr. A.P.J Abdul Kalam and Srijan Pal Singh.

This project has also become a model for increasing the forest cover and has been replicated in the State of Maharashtra. Now, the model has been further extended country-wide by MORD (Ministry of Rural Development) as Bihar Model of Plantations under (MNREGA), and the model has also been adopted by NHAI in their national Green highways Missions Project.
