= R. Arunachalam =

Indian politician

- Occupation: Politician

R. Arunachalam (ta: ஆர். அருணாச்சலம்) was an Indian politician and former Member of the Legislative Assembly of Tamil Nadu. He was elected to the Tamil Nadu legislative assembly as an Anna Dravida Munnetra Kazhagam candidate from Namakkal constituency in 1977, 1980 and 1984 elections.
