= G. R. Vasanthavel =

Indian politician

Member of the Tamil Nadu Legislative Assembly
- Incumbent
- Assumed office 4 May 2026
- Preceded by: A. J. Manikannan
- Constituency: Ulundurpet

Personal details
- Party: Dravida Munnetra Kazhagam
- Occupation: Politician

G. R. Vasanthavel is an Indian politician who is a Member of the 17th Legislative Assembly of Tamil Nadu. He was elected from Ulundurpet as an DMK candidate in 2026.

== Elections contested ==
2026 Tamil Nadu Legislative Assembly election: Ulundurpet
Party	Candidate	Votes	%	±%
DMK	G. R. Vasanthavel	98,471	36.34	▼11.25
AIADMK	Kumaraguru R	96,194	35.50	▼9.93
TVK	Sudhakar M	66,208	24.43	New
NTK	Logeshwari S	6,525	2.41	▼1.30
NOTA	NOTA	1,051	0.39	▼0.55
Independent	Manikandan P	642	0.24	New
All India Puratchi Thalaivar Makkal Munnetra Kazhagam	Udhayakumar R	590	0.22	New
Independent	Krishnamoorthy V	282	0.10	New
Independent	Ramakrishnan R	251	0.09	New
Independent	Senthil P	217	0.08	New
Independent	Parthiban V	170	0.06	New
Anna Makkal Katchi	Balakrishnan K	140	0.05	New
Independent	Sasikumar N	110	0.04	New
Independent	Sankar S	78	0.03	New
Independent	Arasan K	73	0.03	New
Margin of victory		2,277	0.84	▼1.33
Turnout		2,71,002	90.10	▲7.41
Registered electors		3,00,789		▲7,427
DMK hold		Swing	▼11.25	

2016 Tamil Nadu Legislative Assembly election: Ulundurpet
Party	Candidate	Votes	%	±%
AIADMK	R. Kumaraguru	81,973	36.04	−24.05
DMK	G. R. Vasanthavel	77,809	34.21	New
DMDK	Vijayakanth	34,447	15.14	New
PMK	K. Balu	20,233	8.89	New
Independent	G. V. Saravanan	2,657	1.17	New
Independent	P. Shanmugam	1,791	0.79	New
Margin of victory		4,164	1.83	−26.18
Turnout		227,476	82.89	−0.52
Registered electors		274,436		
AIADMK hold		Swing	-24.05	
