= A. Miller =

Indian politician

Member of the Tamil Nadu Legislative Assembly
- In office 2001–2006
- Preceded by: B. M. Mubarak
- Succeeded by: K. Ramachandran
- Constituency: Gudalur

Personal details
- Born: 6 September 1954 Rockwood Estate
- Party: All India Anna Dravida Munnetra Kazhagam
- Profession: Business

A. Miller is an Indian politician and a former Member of the Tamil Nadu Legislative Assembly. He hails from the Gudalur region in the Nilgiris district. A bachelor's degree holder, Miller belongs to the All India Anna Dravida Munnetra Kazhagam (AIADMK) party. He contested and won from the Gudalur Assembly constituency in the 2001 Tamil Nadu Legislative Assembly elections to become a Member of the Legislative Assembly (MLA).

== Electoral Performance ==
=== 2001 ===
2001 Tamil Nadu Legislative Assembly election: Gudalur
Party	Candidate	Votes	%	±%
AIADMK	A. Miller	78,809	57.43%	35.09%
DMK	M. Pandiaraj	46,116	33.61%	−25.82%
MDMK	I. N. Nanjan	6,091	4.44%	
JD(S)	K. T. Bellie	2,860	2.08%	
Independent	K. V. Balan	1,407	1.03%	
Independent	C. E. M. Abdul Azeez	1,092	0.80%	
Independent	M. Thangavel	840	0.61%	
Margin of victory		32,693	23.83%	−13.26%
Turnout		137,215	59.93%	−4.97%
Registered electors		229,078		
AIADMK gain from DMK		Swing	-2.00%	
