= Kandasamy =

Kandasamy (alternate spellings include Kantacami, Kandasami, Kanthasamy, Kanthaswamy and others) is a Tamil name for Kartikeya. It is also a common male given name in India.

== People ==
- M. Kandaswamy Padayachi, former Ulundurpet MLA
- K. Kandasamy, former Andipatti MLA
- R. Kandaswami, former Tiruchengode MLA
- K. V. Kandaswamy, former Kinathukadavu MLA
- M. Kandaswamy (Tamil Nadu politician), former Kulithalai MLA
- P. Kandaswamy, former Pongalur MLA
- K. P. Kandasamy, former Tamil Nadu minister and founder of Dinakaran
- Meena Kandasamy (born 1984), Indian poet and writer

== Cinema ==
- Kanthaswamy, a 2009 Indian Tamil film directed by Susi Ganesan
