= Nilgiris Lok Sabha constituency =

Parliamentary constituency in Tamil Nadu, India

Coordinates: 11.5°N 76.6°E

Nilgiris
- Lok Sabha constituency
- Interactive map of Nilgiris Loksabha constituency, post-2008 delimitation

Constituency details
- Country: India
- Region: South India
- State: Tamil Nadu
- Assembly constituencies: Bhavanisagar (SC); Udhagamandalam; Gudalur (SC); Coonoor; Mettuppalayam; Avanashi (SC)
- Established: 1957
- Total electors: 13,65,608
- Reservation: SC

Member of Parliament
- 18th Lok Sabha
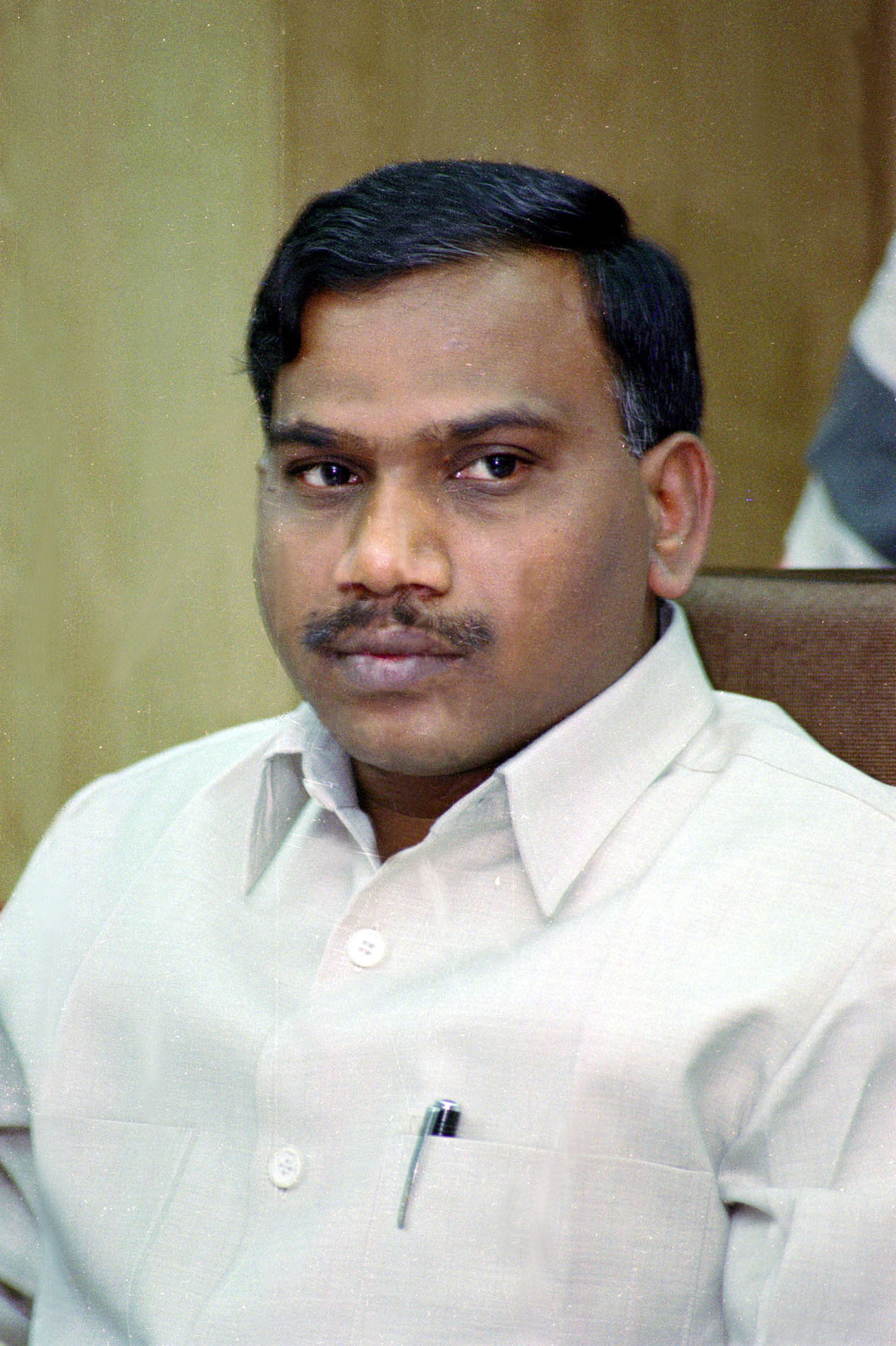
- Incumbent A. Raja
- Party: DMK
- Alliance: None
- Elected year: 2024

Nilgiris is a Lok Sabha (Parliament of India) constituency in Tamil Nadu. Its Tamil Nadu Parliamentary Constituency number is 19 of 39. Since 2009, this constituency is reserved for the candidates belonging to the Scheduled Castes.

== Assembly segments ==
=== 2009-present ===
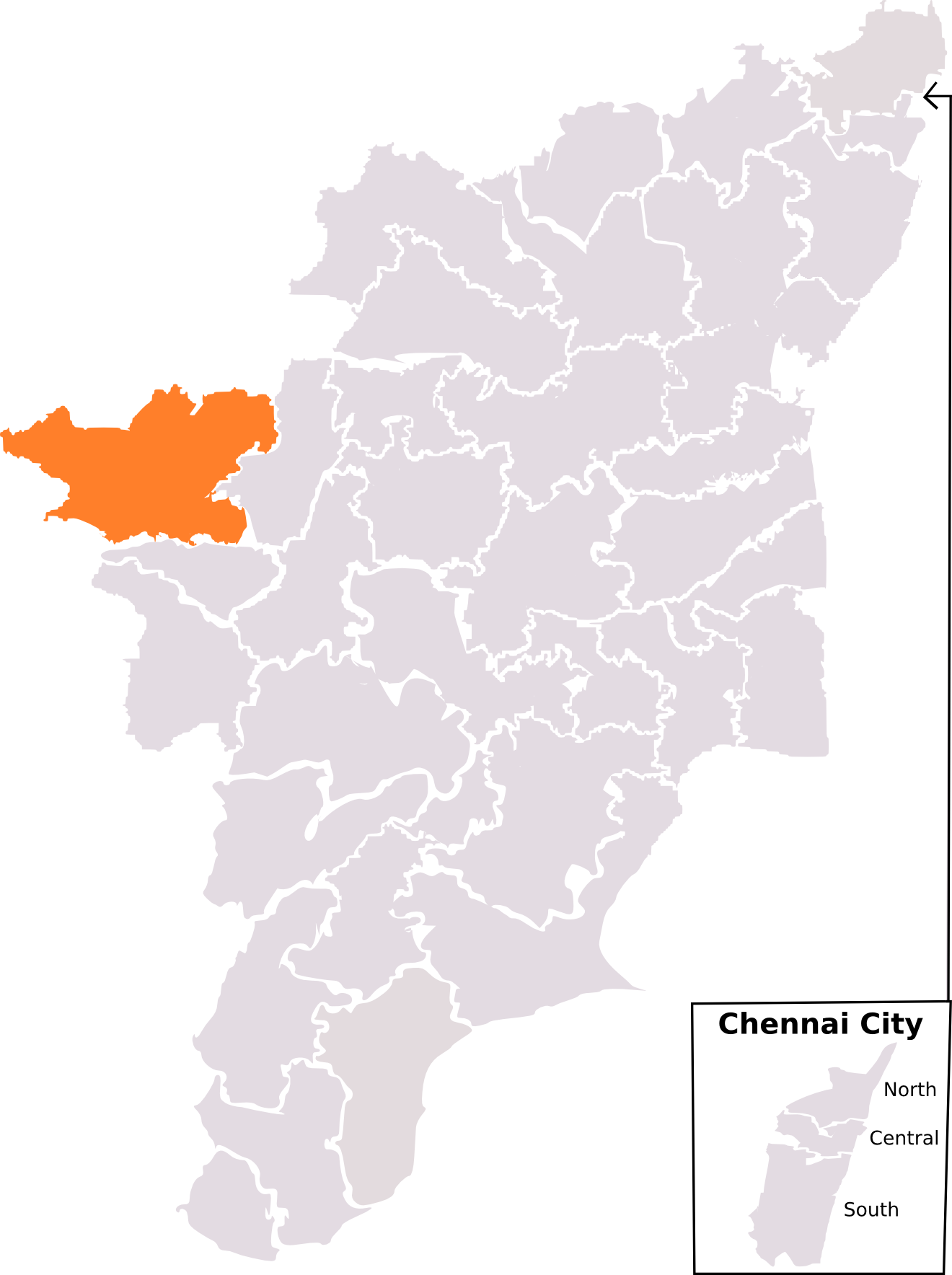
Nilgiris constituency as laid out by 2008 Delimitation

Constituency number	Name	Reserved for (SC/ST/None)	District	Party	2024 Lead
107.	Bhavanisagar	SC	Erode	TVK	DMK
108.	Udhagamandalam	None	Nilgiris	BJP	DMK
109	Gudalur	SC	Nilgiris	DMK	DMK
110.	Coonoor	None	Nilgiris	DMK	DMK
111.	Mettuppalayam	None	Coimbatore	TVK	DMK
112.	Avanashi	SC	Tiruppur	TVK	DMK

=== Before 2009 ===
1. Mettupalayam
2. Avinashi (SC)
3. Thondamuthur (moved to Pollachi Constituency)
4. Coonoor (SC)
5. Udhagamandalam
6. Gudalur

== Members of Parliament ==
Year	Member	Party
1957	C.Nanjappa	Indian National Congress
1962	Akkamma Devi	Indian National Congress
1967	M.K. Nanja Gowder	Swatantra Party
1971	J. Matha Gowder	Dravida Munnetra Kazhagam
1977	P. S Ramalingam	All India Anna Dravida Munnetra Kazhagam
1980	R. Prabhu	Indian National Congress
1984	R. Prabhu	Indian National Congress
1989	R. Prabhu	Indian National Congress
1991	R. Prabhu	Indian National Congress
1996	S. R. Balasubramaniam	Tamil Maanila Congress
1998	Master Mathan	Bharatiya Janata Party
1999	Master Mathan	Bharatiya Janata Party
2004	R. Prabhu	Indian National Congress
2009	A. Raja	Dravida Munnetra Kazhagam
2014	C. Gopalakrishnan	All India Anna Dravida Munnetra Kazhagam
2019	A. Raja	Dravida Munnetra Kazhagam
2024	A. Raja	Dravida Munnetra Kazhagam

== Election results ==
Vote share of Winning candidates
2024	46.44%
2019	54.36%
2014	52.31%
2009	44.67%
2004	63.28%
1999	50.73%
1998	46.49%
1996	62.91%
1991	58.75%
1989	61.49%
1984	60.31%
1980	57.18%
1977	55.85%
1971	58.25%
1967	48.06%
1962	52.54%
1957	59.16%

=== General Elections 2024 ===
2024 Indian general election: Nilgiris
Party	Candidate	Votes	%	±%
DMK	A. Raja	473,212	46.44	▼7.92
BJP	L. Murugan	232,627	22.83	New
AIADMK	D. Logesh Tamilselvan	220,230	21.61	▼12.33
NOTA	None of the above	13,000	1.28	▼0.52
Margin of victory		240,585	21.06	▲0.64
Turnout		1,142,549		
Registered electors				
DMK hold		Swing		

=== General Elections 2019 ===
2019 Indian general election: Nilgiris
Party	Candidate	Votes	%	±%
DMK	A. Raja	547,832	54.36	+13.89
AIADMK	M. Thiyagarajan	3,42,009	33.94	−18.37
MNM	N. Rajenthiran	41,169	4.09	N/A
Independent	M. Ramaswamy	40,419	4.01	New
NOTA	None of the above	18,149	1.80	−3.45
Margin of victory		2,05,823	20.42	8.59
Turnout		10,07,774	74.01	3.92
Registered electors		13,66,060		7.63
DMK gain from AIADMK		Swing	2.05	

=== General Elections 2014 ===
2014 Indian general election: Nilgiris
Party	Candidate	Votes	%	±%
AIADMK	C. Gopalakrishnan	463,700	52.31	
DMK	A. Raja	3,58,760	40.47	−4.20
NOTA	None of the above	46,559	5.25	
INC	P. Gandhi	37,702	4.25	
AAP	M. T. Rani	12,525	1.41	
Margin of victory		1,04,940	11.84	−0.29
Turnout		8,86,517	73.55	−0.84
Registered electors		12,69,173		26.52
AIADMK gain from DMK		Swing	7.63	

=== General Elections 2009 ===
2009 Indian general election: Nilgiris
Party	Candidate	Votes	%	±%
DMK	A. Raja	316,802	44.67%	
MDMK	C. Krishnan	2,30,781	32.54%	
DMDK	S. Selvaraj	76,613	10.80%	
KNMK	S. Bhadiran	32,776	4.62%	
BJP	S. Gurumurthy	18,690	2.64%	−30.35%
Independent	C. Velmurugan	11,979	1.69%	
Independent	G. Nagaraju	8,821	1.24%	
Margin of victory		86,021	12.13%	−18.16%
Turnout		7,09,158	70.75%	11.42%
Registered electors		10,03,168		−23.86%
DMK gain from INC		Swing	-18.60%	

=== General Elections 2004 ===
2004 Indian general election: Nilgiris
Party	Candidate	Votes	%	±%
INC	R. Prabhu	494,121	63.28%	15.83%
BJP	Master Mathan	2,57,619	32.99%	−17.74%
Independent	T. K. Pappannan	10,649	1.36%	
YSP	P. Kumaran	6,580	0.84%	
Independent	M. Tirrumurthi	3,630	0.46%	
Margin of victory		2,36,502	30.29%	27.00%
Turnout		7,80,890	59.29%	4.19%
Registered electors		13,17,502		−2.30%
INC gain from BJP		Swing	12.55%	

=== General Elections 1999 ===
1999 Indian general election: Nilgiris
Party	Candidate	Votes	%	±%
BJP	Master Mathan	369,828	50.73%	46.47%
INC	R. Prabhu	3,45,869	47.44%	21.76%
PT	C. Chinnaraj	7,612	1.04%	
Margin of victory		23,959	3.29%	−5.41%
Turnout		7,29,000	55.08%	−11.34%
Registered electors		13,48,475		4.20%
BJP hold		Swing	-12.17%	

=== General Elections 1998 ===
1998 Indian general election: Nilgiris
Party	Candidate	Votes	%	±%
BJP	Master Mathan	322,818	46.49%	
TMC(M)	S. R. Balasubramaniam	2,62,433	37.80%	
INC	R. Prabhu	1,06,588	15.35%	
Margin of victory		60,385	8.70%	−28.53%
Turnout		6,94,358	55.50%	−10.92%
Registered electors		12,94,110		7.93%
BJP gain from TMC(M)		Swing	-16.41%	

=== General Elections 1996 ===
1996 Indian general election: Nilgiris
Party	Candidate	Votes	%	±%
TMC(M)	S. R. Balasubramaniam	475,515	62.91%	
INC	R. Prabhu	1,94,139	25.68%	−33.07%
JD	C. V. Kandasamy	38,462	5.09%	
BJP	Master Mathan	32,185	4.26%	−1.99%
Margin of victory		2,81,376	37.22%	9.82%
Turnout		7,55,924	66.42%	4.18%
Registered electors		11,99,070		8.64%
TMC(M) gain from INC		Swing	4.15%	

=== General Elections 1991 ===
1991 Indian general election: Nilgiris
Party	Candidate	Votes	%	±%
INC	R. Prabhu	387,707	58.75%	−2.74%
DMK	S. Duraisamy	2,06,905	31.35%	−6.67%
BJP	Master Mathan	41,231	6.25%	
IUML	K. M. Mohamed Zackariah	7,160	1.09%	
Margin of victory		1,80,802	27.40%	3.94%
Turnout		6,59,884	62.24%	−5.73%
Registered electors		11,03,713		−0.13%
INC hold		Swing	-2.74%	

=== General Elections 1989 ===
1989 Indian general election: Nilgiris
Party	Candidate	Votes	%	±%
INC	R. Prabhu	455,411	61.49%	1.18%
DMK	S. A. Mahalingam	2,81,640	38.03%	0.99%
Margin of victory		1,73,771	23.46%	0.18%
Turnout		7,40,620	67.98%	−3.84%
Registered electors		11,05,096		33.51%
INC hold		Swing	1.18%	

=== General Elections 1984 ===
1984 Indian general election: Nilgiris
Party	Candidate	Votes	%	±%
INC	R. Prabhu	341,824	60.31%	
DMK	C. T. Dhandapani	2,09,885	37.03%	
Independent	Kovai Ganesan	3,203	0.57%	
Independent	K. Devappan	2,988	0.53%	
Margin of victory		1,31,939	23.28%	5.36%
Turnout		5,66,742	71.82%	5.39%
Registered electors		8,27,733		12.65%
INC gain from INC(I)		Swing	3.13%	

=== General Elections 1980 ===
1980 Indian general election: Nilgiris
Party	Candidate	Votes	%	±%
INC	R. Prabhu	273,614	57.18%	
JP	T. T. S. Thippiah	1,87,871	39.26%	
JP(S)	G. S. Venkatachalam	8,827	1.84%	
Independent	K. P. Raju	2,846	0.59%	
Independent	J. Selavaraj	2,461	0.51%	
Margin of victory		85,743	17.92%	4.21%
Turnout		4,78,505	66.43%	2.52%
Registered electors		7,34,760		5.63%
INC gain from AIADMK		Swing	1.33%	

=== General Elections 1977 ===
1977 Indian general election: Nilgiris
Party	Candidate	Votes	%	±%
AIADMK	P. S. Ramalingam	241,777	55.85%	
INC(O)	M. K. Nanja Gowder	1,82,431	42.14%	0.39%
Independent	V. Subramaniam	5,057	1.17%	
Independent	Aadrpus Mayason	3,622	0.84%	
Margin of victory		59,346	13.71%	−2.79%
Turnout		4,32,887	63.91%	−5.71%
Registered electors		6,95,566		25.58%
AIADMK gain from DMK		Swing	-2.40%	

=== General Elections 1971 ===
1971 Indian general election: Nilgiris
Party	Candidate	Votes	%	±%
DMK	J. Matha Gowder	215,654	58.25%	
INC(O)	Akkamma Devi	1,54,560	41.75%	−0.66%
Margin of victory		61,094	16.50%	10.86%
Turnout		3,70,214	69.62%	−2.69%
Registered electors		5,53,870		10.31%
DMK gain from SWA		Swing	10.20%	

=== General Elections 1967 ===
1967 Indian general election: Nilgiris
Party	Candidate	Votes	%	±%
SWA	M. K. N. Gowder	167,712	48.06%	
INC	A. Devi	1,48,010	42.41%	−10.13%
CPI	T. S. K. Gowder	33,275	9.53%	
Margin of victory		19,702	5.65%	−22.68%
Turnout		3,48,997	72.31%	0.78%
Registered electors		5,02,089		11.46%
SWA gain from INC		Swing	-4.48%	

=== General Elections 1962 ===
1962 Indian general election: Nilgiris
Party	Candidate	Votes	%	±%
INC	Akkamma Devi	163,420	52.54%	−6.62%
CPI	M. E. Madhanan	75,299	24.21%	
SWA	A. K. Bheeman	72,337	23.26%	
Margin of victory		88,121	28.33%	−3.40%
Turnout		3,11,056	71.53%	20.09%
Registered electors		4,50,481		12.02%
INC hold		Swing	-6.62%	

=== General Elections 1957 ===
1957 Indian general election: Nilgiris
Party	Candidate	Votes	%	±%
INC	C. Nanjappan	122,388	59.16%	
Independent	P. S. Bharathi	56,754	27.43%	
Independent	P. N. Mariappan	27,727	13.40%	
Independent	M. V. Ramachandra Naidu	0	0.00%	
Margin of victory		65,634	31.73%	
Turnout		2,06,869	51.44%	
Registered electors		4,02,143		
INC win (new seat)				

== See also ==
- Nilgiris district
- List of constituencies of the Lok Sabha
