= Gudalur Assembly constituency =

One of the 234 State Legislative Assembly Constituencies in Tamil Nadu, in India

Coordinates: 11.50°N 76.50°E

Gudalur
- Constituency No. 109 for the Tamil Nadu Legislative Assembly

Constituency details
- Country: India
- Region: South India
- State: Tamil Nadu
- District: Nilgiris
- Lok Sabha constituency: Nilgiris
- Established: 1967
- Total electors: 1,85,460
- Reservation: SC

Member of Legislative Assembly
- 17th Tamil Nadu Legislative Assembly
- Incumbent Dhravidamani.M
- Party: DMK
- Alliance: SPA
- Elected year: 2026

Gudalur is a state assembly constituency in Nilgiris district in Tamil Nadu. Its State Assembly Constituency number is 109. It was created from changes made to the Udagamandalam constituency in 1967 and was initially reserved for candidates from the Scheduled Castes. The reservation criteria ceased in 1977 but were reinstated for the 2011 elections. In between, the 2008 boundary changes had made it smaller. It is one of the 234 State Legislative Assembly Constituencies in Tamil Nadu, in India. It comes under Nilgiris Lok Sabha constituency.

== Members of the Legislative Assembly ==
Year	Winner	Party
1971	K. H. Bomman	Swatantra Party
1977	K. Hutchi Gowder	Dravida Munnetra Kazhagam
1980	K. Hutchi Gowder	Dravida Munnetra Kazhagam
1984	K. Hutchi Gowder	All India Anna Dravida Munnetra Kazhagam
1989	M. K. Kareem	Indian National Congress
1991	K. R. Raju	All India Anna Dravida Munnetra Kazhagam
1996	B. M. Mubarak	Dravida Munnetra Kazhagam
2001	A. Miller	All India Anna Dravida Munnetra Kazhagam
2006	K. Ramachandran	Dravida Munnetra Kazhagam
2011	M. Thiravidamani	Dravida Munnetra Kazhagam
2016	M. Thiravidamani	Dravida Munnetra Kazhagam
2021	Pon Jayaseelan	All India Anna Dravida Munnetra Kazhagam
2026	Dhravidamani.M	Dravida Munnetra Kazhagam

== Election results ==
Vote share of winning candidates
2026	43.37%
2021	47.00%
2016	47.39%
2011	58.67%
2006	51.72%
2001	57.43%
1996	59.43%
1991	48.46%
1989	33.61%
1984	57.80%
1980	58.39%
1977	26.29%
1971	45.45%
1967	49.24%

=== 2026 ===
2026 Tamil Nadu Legislative Assembly election: Gudalur
Party	Candidate	Votes	%	±%
DMK	Dhravidamani.M	65,590	43.37	▼2.21
AIADMK	Pon.Jayaseelan	42,757	28.27	▼18.73
TVK	Deepak Sai Kishore.A	34,962	23.12	New
NTK	Karthik.R	6,199	4.10	▼1.23
NOTA	NOTA	871	0.58	▼0.16
Margin of victory		22,833	15.10	▲13.68
Turnout		1,51,241	81.55	▲9.02
Registered electors		1,85,460		▼3,761
DMK gain from AIADMK		Swing	▼2.21	

=== 2021 ===
2021 Tamil Nadu Legislative Assembly election: Gudalur
Party	Candidate	Votes	%	±%
AIADMK	Pon Jayaseelan	64,496	47.00	9.81
DMK	S. Kasilingam	62,551	45.58	−1.81
NTK	R. Ketheeswaran	7,317	5.33	3.54
DMDK	A. Yogeswaran	1,173	0.85	
NOTA	Nota	1,017	0.74	−0.65
MNM	J. Babu	960	0.70	
Margin of victory		1,945	1.42	−8.79
Turnout		137,240	72.53	−0.25
Rejected ballots		488	0.36	
Registered electors		189,221		
AIADMK gain from DMK		Swing	-0.40	

=== 2016 ===
2016 Tamil Nadu Legislative Assembly election: Gudalur
Party	Candidate	Votes	%	±%
DMK	M. Thiravidamani	62,128	47.39	−11.27
AIADMK	S. Kalaiselvan	48,749	37.19	
CPI(M)	P. Tamilmani	9,044	6.90	
BJP	P. M. Parasuraman	5,548	4.23	0.95
NTK	S. Karmegam	2,347	1.79	
NOTA	None Of The Above	1,825	1.39	
PMK	R. Murugesan @ Murugesh	684	0.52	
Independent	G. Kamaraj	468	0.36	
Independent	R. P. Chenguttuvan	302	0.23	
Margin of victory		13,379	10.21	−13.81
Turnout		131,095	72.78	1.27
Registered electors		180,136		
DMK hold		Swing	-11.27	

=== 2011 ===
2011 Tamil Nadu Legislative Assembly election: Gudalur
Party	Candidate	Votes	%	±%
DMK	M. Thiravidamani	66,871	58.67	6.94
DMDK	S. Selvaraj	39,497	34.65	29.12
BJP	D. Anbarasan	3,741	3.28	0.30
Independent	S. Viswanathan	2,288	2.01	
Independent	K. Senthilkumar	1,588	1.39	
Margin of victory		27,374	24.02	9.90
Turnout		159,402	71.51	3.47
Registered electors		113,985		
DMK hold		Swing	6.94	

=== 2006 ===
2006 Tamil Nadu Legislative Assembly election: Gudalur
Party	Candidate	Votes	%	±%
DMK	K. Ramachandran	74,147	51.72	18.12
AIADMK	A. Miller	53,915	37.61	−19.82
DMDK	L. Krishnamurthy	7,935	5.54	
BJP	B. Kumaran	4,270	2.98	
Independent	V. S. Johnson	1,030	0.72	
Independent	M. Rajammal	828	0.58	
Independent	I. Devadass	753	0.53	
Independent	V. Duraiswamy	474	0.33	
Margin of victory		20,232	14.11	−9.71
Turnout		143,352	68.04	8.10
Registered electors		210,699		
DMK gain from AIADMK		Swing	-5.71	

=== 2001 ===
2001 Tamil Nadu Legislative Assembly election: Gudalur
Party	Candidate	Votes	%	±%
AIADMK	A. Miller	78,809	57.43	35.09
DMK	M. Pandiaraj	46,116	33.61	−25.82
MDMK	I. N. Nanjan	6,091	4.44	
JD(S)	K. T. Bellie	2,860	2.08	
Independent	K. V. Balan	1,407	1.03	
Independent	C. E. M. Abdul Azeez	1,092	0.80	
Independent	M. Thangavel	840	0.61	
Margin of victory		32,693	23.83	−13.26
Turnout		137,215	59.93	−4.97
Registered electors		229,078		
AIADMK gain from DMK		Swing	-2.00	

=== 1996 ===
1996 Tamil Nadu Legislative Assembly election: Gudalur
Party	Candidate	Votes	%	±%
DMK	B. M. Mubarak	73,565	59.43	
AIADMK	K. R. Raju	27,660	22.35	−26.12
CPI(M)	N. Vasu	12,978	10.48	−27.09
BJP	I. Bhojan	5,359	4.33	−2.13
JP	M. Alwas	1,115	0.90	
PMK	C. Santhanam	1,006	0.81	
Independent	R. Periasamy	433	0.35	
Independent	R. M. Sabiyulla	416	0.34	
Independent	L. Chandramohan	299	0.24	
Independent	K. K. Balan	250	0.20	
Independent	K. Ravindran	165	0.13	
Margin of victory		45,905	37.08	26.20
Turnout		123,784	64.90	0.52
Registered electors		199,758		
DMK gain from AIADMK		Swing	10.97	

=== 1991 ===
1991 Tamil Nadu Legislative Assembly election: Gudalur
Party	Candidate	Votes	%	±%
AIADMK	K. R. Raju	54,766	48.46	41.90
CPI(M)	T. P. Kamalatchan	42,460	37.57	5.09
IUML	Mohammed P K	7,618	6.74	
BJP	I. Bhojan	7,305	6.46	
THMM	A. Narayanan	310	0.27	
Independent	C. Manickam	192	0.17	
PMK	M. K. Asokan	184	0.16	
Independent	M. Sahul Hameed	173	0.15	
Margin of victory		12,306	10.89	9.76
Turnout		113,008	64.38	−8.87
Registered electors		181,632		
AIADMK gain from INC		Swing	14.85	

=== 1989 ===
1989 Tamil Nadu Legislative Assembly election: Gudalur
Party	Candidate	Votes	%	±%
INC	M. K. Kareem	38,147	33.61	
CPI(M)	T. P. Kamalatchan	36,867	32.49	
CPI	A. Ballie	19,324	17.03	
AIADMK	K. Hutchi Gowder	7,446	6.56	−51.24
Independent	R. Singaram	5,799	5.11	
Independent	I. Bhoja	3,932	3.46	
Independent	M. J. Cherian	1,110	0.98	
Independent	A. Thangavel	255	0.22	
Independent	K. Palaniammal	253	0.22	
Independent	S. Raju	107	0.09	
Independent	R. Bellarmin	107	0.09	
Margin of victory		1,280	1.13	−17.00
Turnout		113,489	73.25	1.47
Registered electors		158,479		
INC gain from AIADMK		Swing	-24.18	

=== 1984 ===
1984 Tamil Nadu Legislative Assembly election: Gudalur
Party	Candidate	Votes	%	±%
AIADMK	K. Hutchi Gowder	52,470	57.80	
DMK	K. Karuppusamy	36,013	39.67	−18.72
Independent	K. Gangadharan	584	0.64	
Independent	S. Ameer Sabi	562	0.62	
Independent	M. I. Samsudeen	536	0.59	
Independent	I. Devadass	276	0.30	
Independent	A. Thangavelu	198	0.22	
Independent	P. Perumal	144	0.16	
Margin of victory		16,457	18.13	−2.74
Turnout		90,783	71.78	15.89
Registered electors		132,008		
AIADMK gain from DMK		Swing	-0.59	

=== 1980 ===
1980 Tamil Nadu Legislative Assembly election: Gudalur
Party	Candidate	Votes	%	±%
DMK	K. Hutchi Gowder	36,780	58.39	32.10
CPI	M. S. Narayanan Nair	23,636	37.52	
Independent	R. Subramaniam	2,362	3.75	
Independent	A. Bellie	212	0.34	
Margin of victory		13,144	20.87	20.25
Turnout		62,990	55.89	−7.65
Registered electors		114,612		
DMK hold		Swing	32.10	

=== 1977 ===
1977 Tamil Nadu Legislative Assembly election: Gudalur
Party	Candidate	Votes	%	±%
DMK	K. Hutchi Gowder	15,323	26.29	
Independent	C. I. Allapitchai	14,963	25.68	
INC	K. Kallan	10,196	17.50	
JP	K. M. Hiria Gowder	6,915	11.87	
Independent	K. Baby	5,364	9.20	
Independent	K. Gopalakrishnan Nair	2,406	4.13	
Independent	M. J. Cherian Vakil	1,107	1.90	
Independent	R. Kuppuswamy	1,014	1.74	
Independent	V. N. Krishnan Kutty Nair	291	0.50	
Independent	K. Raman Kutty	248	0.43	
Independent	V. Sivaraman	188	0.32	
Margin of victory		360	0.62	−4.15
Turnout		58,276	63.53	8.18
Registered electors		93,409		
DMK gain from SWA		Swing	-19.16	

=== 1971 ===
1971 Tamil Nadu Legislative Assembly election: Gudalur
Party	Candidate	Votes	%	±%
SWA	K. H. Bomman	18,519	45.45	
CPI	K. Putta	16,578	40.69	
CPI(M)	K. Rajan	5,648	13.86	
Margin of victory		1,941	4.76	3.27
Turnout		40,745	55.36	−7.72
Registered electors		81,325		
SWA gain from INC		Swing	-3.79	

=== 1967 ===
1967 Madras Legislative Assembly election: Gudalur
Party	Candidate	Votes	%	±%
INC	C. Nanjam	20,675	49.24	
SWA	Bomman	20,047	47.74	
Independent	Madaswamy	1,266	3.02	
Margin of victory		628	1.50	
Turnout		41,988	63.07	
Registered electors		69,434		
INC win (new seat)				
