= A. Soundarapandian =

Indian politician

Member of the Tamil Nadu Legislative Assembly
- In office 2006–2011
- Preceded by: K. Kandaswamy
- Succeeded by: K. Ramachandran
- Constituency: Coonoor

Personal details
- Born: 29 March 1968 S. P. Natham
- Party: Dravida Munnetra Kazhagam
- Education: Bharathiar University, Coimbatore
- Profession: Business, Lawyer

A. Soundarapandian is an Indian politician and a former Member of the Tamil Nadu Legislative Assembly. Hailing from the Coonoor region of the Nilgiris district, he completed his undergraduate and law degrees (B.A., B.L.). Representing the Dravida Munnetra Kazhagam (DMK) party, he contested and won from the Coonoor assembly constituency in the 2006 Tamil Nadu Legislative Assembly elections to become a Member of the Legislative Assembly (MLA).

== Electoral Performance ==
=== 2006 ===
2006 Tamil Nadu Legislative Assembly election: Coonoor
| Party | Candidate | Votes | % | ±% |
|---|---|---|---|---|
| DMK | A. Soundarapandian | 45,303 | 47.36% | 8.98% |
| AIADMK | Selvaraj. M | 39,589 | 41.38% | |
| DMDK | Chidambaram. V | 7,227 | 7.55% | |
| BJP | Anbarasan (Alias) Anbu. D | 1,729 | 1.81% | |
| Independent | Ramachandran. P | 594 | 0.62% | |
| BSP | Theinmathi. P | 569 | 0.59% | |
| Independent | Annakili. A | 405 | 0.42% | |
| AIFB | Arumugam. P | 250 | 0.26% | |
| Margin of victory | | 5,714 | 5.97% | −11.52% |
| Turnout | | 95,666 | 64.85% | 11.84% |
| Registered electors | | 1,47,524 | | |
| DMK gain from TMC(M) | | Swing | -8.51% | |
