= V. Mahendrao =

Indian civil servant and administrator

Administrator of Mahe
- In office July 10, 1979 – April 14, 1980
- Preceded by: D. S. Negi
- Succeeded by: K. Ramachandran

V. Mahendrao was an Indian civil servant and administrator. He was the administrator of Mahe from July 10, 1979, to April 14, 1980.
