= M. Sivakumar (Coonoor) =

Member of the Legislative Assembly, Tamil Nadu Legislative Assembly
- In office 1984–1989
- Preceded by: M. Ranganathan
- Succeeded by: N. Thangavel
- Constituency: Coonoor

Personal details
- Born: 6 April 1949 Ettichery
- Party: All India Anna Dravida Munnetra Kazhagam
- Profession: Agriculture

M. Sivakumar is an Indian politician and a former Member of the Legislative Assembly (MLA) of Tamil Nadu. He hails from the Sholurmattam (Achington) area in the Kotagiri taluk of the Nilgiris district.

Sivakumar completed his education up to the 8th grade. As a member of the All India Anna Dravida Munnetra Kazhagam (AIADMK) party, he contested the 1984 Tamil Nadu Legislative Assembly elections from the Coonoor Assembly constituency and was elected as a Member of the Legislative Assembly.

== Electoral Performance ==
=== 1984 ===
1984 Tamil Nadu Legislative Assembly election: Coonoor
Party	Candidate	Votes	%	±%
AIADMK	M. Sivakumar	47,113	56.70%	19.12%
DMK	M. Ranganathan	34,990	42.11%	−14.74%
Independent	Komali	993	1.20%	
Margin of victory		12,123	14.59%	−4.68%
Turnout		83,096	70.58%	16.07%
Registered electors		1,23,350		
AIADMK gain from DMK		Swing	-0.15%	
