= R. Ganesh =

R. Ganesh may refer to

- Shatavadhani Ganesh (born 1962), an Indian author, Sanskrit scholar and practitioner of Avadhana
- R. Ganesh (politician) (fl. 2010s–2020s), a politician in the Indian state of Tamil Nadu
