= S. R. Balasubramaniam =

Indian politician from Tamil Nadu

Member of Parliament, Rajya Sabha
- In office 30 June 2016 – 29 June 2022
- Preceded by: A. W. Rabi Bernard
- Succeeded by: C. V. Shanmugam
- Constituency: Tamil Nadu

Union Minister of State for Parliamentary Affairs
- In office 29 June 1996 – 21 April 1997
- Prime Minister: H. D. Deve Gowda
- Preceded by: Ummareddy Venkateswarlu
- Succeeded by: Himself
- In office 1 May 1997 – 19 March 1998 Serving with M. P. Veerendra Kumar(26 May 1997–2 July1997); Jayanthi Natarajan(9 June 1997–19 March 1998)
- Prime Minister: Inder Kumar Gujral
- Preceded by: Himself
- Succeeded by: R. K. Kumar

Union Minister of State for Personnel, Public Grievances and Pensions
- In office 29 June 1996 – 21 April 1997
- Prime Minister: H. D. Deve Gowda
- Preceded by: Margaret Alva
- Succeeded by: Himself
- In office 1 May 1997 – 19 March 1998
- Prime Minister: Inder Kumar Gujral
- Preceded by: Himself
- Succeeded by: Kadambur R. Janarthanan

Member of Parliament, Lok Sabha
- In office 1996–1998
- Preceded by: R. Prabhu
- Succeeded by: Master Mathan
- Constituency: Nilgiris, Tamil Nadu

12th Leader of the Opposition in the Tamil Nadu Legislative Assembly
- In office 15 May 1991 – 12 March 1996
- Chief Minister: J. Jayalalithaa
- Preceded by: G. K. Moopanar
- Succeeded by: S. Balakrishnan
- Constituency: Pongalur

Member of the Tamil Nadu Legislative Assembly
- In office 1989–1996
- Preceded by: P. Kandaswamy
- Succeeded by: P. Mohan Kandaswamy
- Constituency: Pongalur

Personal details
- Born: 16 November 1938 (age 87) Sultanpet, Coimbatore district, Madras Presidency, British India
- Party: All India Anna Dravida Munnetra Kazhagam
- Other political affiliations: Indian National Congress; Tamil Maanila Congress (Moopanar)
- Spouse: B. Balamani (m. 1968)
- Children: 2 daughters
- Parents: Ramabadra Naidu (father); Rukmani Ammal (mother)
- Education: Pachaiyappa's College; Madras Law College, University of Madras

S. Ramabadra Balasubramaniam, is an Indian politician and former Member of the Legislative Assembly of Tamil Nadu. He was elected to the Tamil Nadu legislative assembly as an Indian National Congress candidate from Pongalur constituency in 1989 and 1991 elections. After being an MLA he was elected as the central minister. He was also an elected member of the Parliament in Lok Sabha from Nilgiris constituency from 1996 to 1998. From 2016 to 2022 he was the Member of Parliament in Rajya Sabha on behalf of AIADMK.

He joined the congress party with the influence of Kamaraj and followed way with G. K. Moopanar. He was elected from Pongalur constituency twice, 1989-1991 and 1991–1996. He served as opposition leader in the Tamil Nadu legislative assembly from 1991 to 1996. He was elected to Lok Sabha from Nilgiris from 1996 to 1998 and became the union minister for personal, public, governance, and parliamentary affairs in 1996–1997.

He was again elected as INC MLA from Thondamuthur constituency from 2001 to 2006.

In June 2016, he was announced as the party's candidate for the Rajya Sabha biennial polls. On 3 June 2016, he was elected unopposed along with three others from his party.
