= Ulundurpet Assembly constituency =

One of the 234 State Legislative Assembly Constituencies in Tamil Nadu in India

Coordinates: 11°41′26″N 79°17′30″E

Ulundurpet
- Constituency No. 77 for the Tamil Nadu Legislative Assembly

Constituency details
- Country: India
- Region: South India
- State: Tamil Nadu
- District: Kallakurichi
- Lok Sabha constituency: Villupuram
- Established: 1951
- Total electors: 3,00,789
- Reservation: None

Member of Legislative Assembly
- 17th Tamil Nadu Legislative Assembly
- Incumbent G. R. Vasanthavel
- Party: DMK
- Alliance: SPA
- Elected year: 2026

Ulundurpet is a state assembly constituency in Kallakurichi district of Tamil Nadu, India. Its State Assembly Constituency number is 77. It comprises Ulundurpettai taluk and is a part of Viluppuram Lok Sabha constituency for national elections to the Parliament of India. It is one of the 234 State Legislative Assembly Constituencies in Tamil Nadu.

== Members of Legislative Assembly ==
=== Madras State ===
Year	Winner	Party
1952	M. Kandaswamy Padayachi	Indian National Congress
1957	M. Kandaswamy Padayachi	Indian National Congress
1962	A. Manonmani Ammal	Swatantra Party
1967	M. Kandaswami Padayachi	Indian National Congress

=== Tamil Nadu ===
Year	Winner	Party
1971	V. Subramaniam	Dravida Munnetra Kazhagam
1977	V. Thulukkanam	Dravida Munnetra Kazhagam
1980	K. Rangasamy	Dravida Munnetra Kazhagam
1984	M. Anandan	All India Anna Dravida Munnetra Kazhagam
1989	K. Angamuthu	Dravida Munnetra Kazhagam
1991	M. Anandan	All India Anna Dravida Munnetra Kazhagam
1996	A. Mani	Dravida Munnetra Kazhagam
2001	N. Ramu	All India Anna Dravida Munnetra Kazhagam
2006	K. Thirunavukkarasu	Dravida Munnetra Kazhagam
2011	R. Kumaraguru	All India Anna Dravida Munnetra Kazhagam
2016	R. Kumaraguru	All India Anna Dravida Munnetra Kazhagam
2021	A. J. Manikannan	Dravida Munnetra Kazhagam
2026	Vasanthavel G.R	Dravida Munnetra Kazhagam

== Election results ==
Vote share of winning candidates
2026	36.34%
2021	47.59%
2016	36.04%
2011	60.09%
2006	44.05%
2001	55.09%
1996	54.34%
1991	65.19%
1989	41.63%
1984	63.18%
1980	55.35%
1977	37.70%
1971	57.87%
1967	47.23%
1962	48.16%
1957	43.21%
1952	48.53%

=== 2026 ===
2026 Tamil Nadu Legislative Assembly election: Ulundurpet
Party	Candidate	Votes	%	±%
DMK	G. R. Vasanthavel	98,471	36.34	▼11.25
AIADMK	Kumaraguru R	96,194	35.50	▼9.93
TVK	Sudhakar M	66,208	24.43	New
NTK	Logeshwari S	6,525	2.41	▼1.30
NOTA	NOTA	1,051	0.39	▼0.55
Margin of victory		2,277	0.84	▼1.33
Turnout		2,71,002	90.10	▲7.41
Registered electors		3,00,789		▲7,427
DMK hold		Swing	▼11.25	

=== 2021 ===
2021 Tamil Nadu Legislative Assembly election: Ulundurpet
Party	Candidate	Votes	%	±%
DMK	A. J. Manikannan	115,451	47.59	+13.39
AIADMK	R. Kumaraguru	110,195	45.43	+9.39
NTK	L. Pushba Mary	9,000	3.71	New
AMMK	K. G. P. Rajamani	2,848	1.17	New
NOTA	NOTA	2,280	0.94	New
Independent	M. Manikkannan	2,107	0.87	New
Margin of victory		5,256	2.17	0.34
Turnout		242,573	82.69	−0.20
Rejected ballots		287	0.12	
Registered electors		293,362		
DMK gain from AIADMK		Swing	11.56	

=== 2016 ===
2016 Tamil Nadu Legislative Assembly election: Ulundurpet
Party	Candidate	Votes	%	±%
AIADMK	R. Kumaraguru	81,973	36.04	−24.05
DMK	G. R. Vasanthavel	77,809	34.21	New
DMDK	Vijayakanth	34,447	15.14	New
PMK	K. Balu	20,233	8.89	New
Independent	G. V. Saravanan	2,657	1.17	New
Independent	P. Shanmugam	1,791	0.79	New
Margin of victory		4,164	1.83	−26.18
Turnout		227,476	82.89	−0.52
Registered electors		274,436		
AIADMK hold		Swing	-24.05	

=== 2011 ===
2011 Tamil Nadu Legislative Assembly election: Ulundurpet
Party	Candidate	Votes	%	±%
AIADMK	R. Kumaraguru	114,794	60.09	New
VCK	M. Mohamedyousuf	61,286	32.08	New
Independent	N. Chandirasekaran	3,642	1.91	New
BJP	A. Anbu	2,662	1.39	−0.69
Independent	L. Jagateesan	1,811	0.95	New
CPI(ML)L	M. Venkatesan	1,751	0.92	New
Independent	G. Muthaiyan	1,743	0.91	New
Independent	M. Johnpeter	1,576	0.82	New
Independent	K. Arasan	1,018	0.53	New
Margin of victory		53,508	28.01	15.41
Turnout		191,047	83.41	14.00
Registered electors		229,056		
AIADMK gain from DMK		Swing	16.04	

=== 2006 ===
2006 Tamil Nadu Legislative Assembly election: Ulundurpet
Party	Candidate	Votes	%	±%
DMK	K. Thirunavu Karasu	65,662	44.05	+6.04
VCK	E. Vijaya Raghavan	46,878	31.45	New
DMDK	C. Shanmugam	30,411	20.40	New
BJP	V. Ramalingam	3,099	2.08	New
Independent	A. Kannan	3,011	2.02	New
Margin of victory		18,784	12.60	−4.48
Turnout		149,061	69.40	7.14
Registered electors		214,774		
DMK gain from AIADMK		Swing	-11.04	

=== 2001 ===
2001 Tamil Nadu Legislative Assembly election: Ulundurpet
Party	Candidate	Votes	%	±%
AIADMK	N. Ramu	73,384	55.09	+17.74
DMK	K. Thirunavukkarasu	50,630	38.01	−16.33
MDMK	K. Angamuthu	9,199	6.91	+2.16
Margin of victory		22,754	17.08	0.09
Turnout		133,213	62.26	−4.51
Registered electors		213,972		
AIADMK gain from DMK		Swing	0.75	

=== 1996 ===
1996 Tamil Nadu Legislative Assembly election: Ulundurpet
Party	Candidate	Votes	%	±%
DMK	A. Mani	67,088	54.34	+30.27
AIADMK	M. Anandan	46,113	37.35	−27.84
MDMK	K. Angamuthu	5,858	4.74	New
AIIC(T)	P. Thangaraju	3,043	2.46	New
Margin of victory		20,975	16.99	−24.13
Turnout		123,463	66.77	−0.01
Registered electors		196,587		
DMK gain from AIADMK		Swing	-10.85	

=== 1991 ===
1991 Tamil Nadu Legislative Assembly election: Ulundurpet
Party	Candidate	Votes	%	±%
AIADMK	M. Anandan	71,785	65.19	+49.11
DMK	Mayilvahanan Pon	26,500	24.06	−17.56
PMK	A. P. Ramasamy	6,172	5.60	New
Independent	Amaladoss Alias Amalan	3,105	2.82	New
BJP	R. Sekar	1,130	1.03	New
Independent	G. Subramaniyan	771	0.70	New
Margin of victory		45,285	41.12	29.97
Turnout		110,122	66.79	−2.53
Registered electors		176,021		
AIADMK gain from DMK		Swing	23.56	

=== 1989 ===
1989 Tamil Nadu Legislative Assembly election: Ulundurpet
Party	Candidate	Votes	%	±%
DMK	K. Angamuthu	44,422	41.63	+8.67
INC	V. Selvaraj	32,517	30.47	New
AIADMK	M. Anandan	17,159	16.08	−47.1
Independent	P. Thangaraju	9,145	8.57	New
Independent	T. Kuppan	1,082	1.01	New
Independent	Mo. Kandaswamy Alias Singh	963	0.90	New
Independent	N. Asokan	690	0.65	New
Margin of victory		11,905	11.16	−19.07
Turnout		106,718	69.31	−2.29
Registered electors		159,159		
DMK gain from AIADMK		Swing	-21.56	

=== 1984 ===
1984 Tamil Nadu Legislative Assembly election: Ulundurpet
Party	Candidate	Votes	%	±%
AIADMK	K. Murugesan Anandan	56,200	63.18	+21.58
DMK	K. Varaharajulu	29,318	32.96	−22.39
Independent	S. Rajamanickam	1,616	1.82	New
Independent	P. Thangaraju	1,338	1.50	New
Independent	G. Kalaivel	478	0.54	New
Margin of victory		26,882	30.22	16.47
Turnout		88,950	71.60	15.42
Registered electors		134,077		
AIADMK gain from DMK		Swing	7.83	

=== 1980 ===
1980 Tamil Nadu Legislative Assembly election: Ulundurpet
Party	Candidate	Votes	%	±%
DMK	K. Rangasamy	40,068	55.35	+17.66
AIADMK	Natesan Karu	30,113	41.60	+14.57
Independent	P. M. Dharmalingam	1,765	2.44	New
Independent	M. Kandasamy	439	0.61	New
Margin of victory		9,955	13.75	3.09
Turnout		72,385	56.18	−1.97
Registered electors		131,665		
DMK hold		Swing	17.66	

=== 1977 ===
1977 Tamil Nadu Legislative Assembly election: Ulundurpet
Party	Candidate	Votes	%	±%
DMK	V. Thulukkanam	26,788	37.70	−20.18
AIADMK	Sathyavani Muthu	19,211	27.04	New
INC	L. Elayaperumal	17,341	24.40	−15.95
JP	M. Jayaraman	3,502	4.93	New
Independent	P. Raju	1,805	2.54	New
Independent	M. Kandasamy	1,668	2.35	New
Independent	M. S. Anbaiah	407	0.57	New
Margin of victory		7,577	10.66	−6.86
Turnout		71,058	58.15	−16.14
Registered electors		125,137		
DMK hold		Swing	-20.18	

=== 1971 ===
1971 Tamil Nadu Legislative Assembly election: Ulundurpet
Party	Candidate	Votes	%	±%
DMK	V. Subramanian	36,191	57.87	+13.4
INC	N. Po. Nambalam	25,236	40.36	−6.87
Independent	M. Samikkannu Padayachi	1,107	1.77	New
Margin of victory		10,955	17.52	14.77
Turnout		62,534	74.29	1.21
Registered electors		87,670		
DMK gain from INC		Swing	10.65	

=== 1967 ===
1967 Madras Legislative Assembly election: Ulundurpet
Party	Candidate	Votes	%	±%
INC	M. Kandaswamy Padayachi	26,796	47.23	+4.04
DMK	V. S. Padayachi	25,236	44.48	New
Independent	A. P. Ramasamy	4,707	8.30	New
Margin of victory		1,560	2.75	−2.23
Turnout		56,739	73.08	12.81
Registered electors		82,609		
INC gain from SWA		Swing	-0.93	

=== 1962 ===
1962 Madras Legislative Assembly election: Ulundurpet
Party	Candidate	Votes	%	±%
SWA	Manonmani Ammal	25,234	48.16	New
INC	M. Kandaswamy Padayachi	22,627	43.18	−0.03
Independent	N. S. N. Govindasami Gounder	4,535	8.66	New
Margin of victory		2,607	4.98	0.39
Turnout		52,396	60.27	3.02
Registered electors		92,580		
SWA gain from INC		Swing	4.95	

=== 1957 ===
1957 Madras Legislative Assembly election: Ulundurpet
Party	Candidate	Votes	%	±%
INC	M. Kandaswamy Padayachi	21,133	43.21	−5.32
Independent	Manonmani Ammal	18,890	38.62	New
Independent	Ramasami Padayachi	5,815	11.89	New
Independent	Chakkari	3,070	6.28	New
Margin of victory		2,243	4.59	−9.20
Turnout		48,908	57.25	2.94
Registered electors		85,430		
INC hold		Swing	-5.32	

=== 1952 ===
1952 Madras Legislative Assembly election: Ulundurpet
Party	Candidate	Votes	%	±%
INC	M. Kandaswamy Padayachi	17,904	48.53	New
TTP	Natesa Gounder	12,817	34.74	New
Socialist Party (India)	Palani Pillai	6,174	16.73	New
Margin of victory		5,087	13.79	
Turnout		36,895	54.31	
Registered electors		67,933		
INC win (new seat)				
