= A. W. Rabi Bernard =

Indian politician

Arokiaswamy William Rabi Bernard

MP of Rajya Sabha for Tamil Nadu
- In office 19 July 2011 – 29 June 2016
- Preceded by: K. V. Ramalingam
- Succeeded by: S. R. Balasubramoniyan

Personal details
- Born: 3 February 1959 (age 67) Koneripatti, Salem district, Tamil Nadu
- Party: AIADMK
- Spouse: T. Berneth Premila
- Children: Madelene Niraimathi, Annie Arokiaselvi, Catherine Cirumalar

A. W. Rabi Bernard (born 1959) is an Indian politician and was a member of the Parliament of India from Tamil Nadu. He represents Anna Dravida Munnetra Kazhagam party. He has interviewed several international and national leaders and business tycoons and he was Professor, Visual Communication, Loyola College, Chennai.

== Education ==
B.A. (Journalism and Mass Communication), M.A. (Communications) Educated at University of Santo Tomas, Philippines.

== See also ==
- Rajya Sabha members from Tamil Nadu
