= Tirunavalur Assembly constituency =

Former constituency of the Tamil Nadu Legislative assembly, in India

Coordinates: 10°47′15″N 78°46′35″E

Thirunavalur
- Former constituency for the Tamil Nadu Legislative Assembly

Constituency details
- Country: India
- Region: South India
- State: Tamil Nadu
- District: Kallakurichi
- Lok Sabha constituency: Thindivanam
- Established: 1967
- Abolished: 2008
- Total electors: 1,66,440

Thirunavalur is a state assembly constituency in Kallakurichi district in Tamil Nadu. Elections and winners in the constituency are listed below.

== Members of the Legislative Assembly ==
Year	Winner	Party
1977	L. Arumugam	All India Anna Dravida Munnetra Kazhagam
1980	V. Subramanian	Dravida Munnetra Kazhagam
1984	T. N. G. A. Manoharan	All India Anna Dravida Munnetra Kazhagam
1989	A. V. Balasubramaniyan	Dravida Munnetra Kazhagam
1991	J. Pannerselvam	All India Anna Dravida Munnetra Kazhagam
1996	A. J. Manikannan	Dravida Munnetra Kazhagam
2001	K. G. P. Gnanamoorthy	All India Anna Dravida Munnetra Kazhagam
2006	R. Kumaraguru	All India Anna Dravida Munnetra Kazhagam

== Election results ==
=== 2006 ===
2006 Tamil Nadu Legislative Assembly election: Thirunavalur
Party	Candidate	Votes	%	±%
AIADMK	R. Kumaraguru	57,235	45.49%	−7.02%
DMK	V. S. Veerapandian	51,048	40.57%	1.18%
DMDK	M. S. Udhayakumar	11,366	9.03%	
Independent	M. Verapathiran	2,116	1.68%	
BJP	B. Muthukumar	1,596	1.27%	
BSP	A. Partheban	672	0.53%	
Independent	G. M. Pandurngan	601	0.48%	
SP	N. Samykannu	308	0.24%	
Independent	D. Vijayaragavan	295	0.23%	
Independent	S. Kumaraguru	279	0.22%	
Independent	R. Periyasamy	180	0.14%	
Margin of victory		6,187	4.92%	−8.21%
Turnout		125,832	75.60%	7.93%
Registered electors		166,440		
AIADMK hold		Swing	-7.02%	

=== 2001 ===
2001 Tamil Nadu Legislative Assembly election: Thirunavalur
Party	Candidate	Votes	%	±%
AIADMK	K. G. P. Gnanamoorthy	59,115	52.51%	22.90%
DMK	A. J. Manikannan	44,342	39.39%	−1.89%
MDMK	A. Poorani	4,549	4.04%	−10.51%
Independent	V. Ranganathan	2,787	2.48%	
RSP	M. Ethirajan	1,786	1.59%	
Margin of victory		14,773	13.12%	1.45%
Turnout		112,579	67.67%	−4.00%
Registered electors		166,402		
AIADMK gain from DMK		Swing	11.23%	

=== 1996 ===
1996 Tamil Nadu Legislative Assembly election: Thirunavalur
Party	Candidate	Votes	%	±%
DMK	A. J. Manikannan	43,983	41.28%	11.68%
AIADMK	K. G. P. Gnanamoorthy	31,547	29.61%	−29.19%
MDMK	A. V. Balasubramaniyan	15,505	14.55%	
Independent	V. Subramaniyan	7,238	6.79%	
PMK	M. Anbalagan	6,570	6.17%	
Independent	K. Gnanasekar	872	0.82%	
RPI	N. Arumugham	324	0.30%	
Independent	S. Balaji	274	0.26%	
Independent	P. George Fathima	235	0.22%	
Margin of victory		12,436	11.67%	−17.53%
Turnout		106,548	71.67%	−0.40%
Registered electors		155,662		
DMK gain from AIADMK		Swing	-17.52%	

=== 1991 ===
1991 Tamil Nadu Legislative Assembly election: Thirunavalur
Party	Candidate	Votes	%	±%
AIADMK	J. Panneer Selvam	56,353	58.80%	35.77%
DMK	A. V. Bala Subramaniyam	28,367	29.60%	−11.86%
PMK	M. Abbaiagan	10,328	10.78%	
Independent	P. Sankar Alias Adisankar	296	0.31%	
THMM	V. Abbay	292	0.30%	
Independent	N. Anantharanganathan	199	0.21%	
Margin of victory		27,986	29.20%	10.78%
Turnout		95,835	72.07%	−2.68%
Registered electors		139,727		
AIADMK gain from DMK		Swing	17.35%	

=== 1989 ===
1989 Tamil Nadu Legislative Assembly election: Thirunavalur
Party	Candidate	Votes	%	±%
DMK	A. V. Bala Subramaniyan	38,948	41.46%	1.46%
AIADMK	P. Kannan	21,640	23.03%	−26.76%
INC	R. Manickam Alias Pandian	16,907	18.00%	
AIADMK	T. N. G. A. Manoharan	12,826	13.65%	−36.14%
Independent	P. George	953	1.01%	
Independent	K. V. Bhuvaraga Murthi	684	0.73%	
Independent	K. Dhandapani	631	0.67%	
Independent	M. Ramalingam	559	0.60%	
Independent	P. Sankar Alias Athisankar	289	0.31%	
Independent	R. Selvambal	231	0.25%	
Independent	P. Arulmani	132	0.14%	
Margin of victory		17,308	18.42%	8.63%
Turnout		93,948	74.75%	−2.68%
Registered electors		129,141		
DMK gain from AIADMK		Swing	-8.33%	

=== 1984 ===
1984 Tamil Nadu Legislative Assembly election: Thirunavalur
Party	Candidate	Votes	%	±%
AIADMK	T. N. G. A. Menoharan	40,539	49.79%	1.73%
DMK	A. V. Balasubramanian	32,566	40.00%	−8.29%
Independent	L. Arumugam	7,226	8.88%	
Independent	Sankar Adisankar	1,087	1.34%	
Margin of victory		7,973	9.79%	9.56%
Turnout		81,418	77.43%	5.83%
Registered electors		112,818		
AIADMK gain from DMK		Swing	1.51%	

=== 1980 ===
1980 Tamil Nadu Legislative Assembly election: Thirunavalur
Party	Candidate	Votes	%	±%
DMK	V. Subramanian	36,517	48.29%	20.52%
AIADMK	T. N. G. A. Manoharan	36,344	48.06%	13.10%
Independent	A. Jayaraman	1,749	2.31%	
Independent	D. Duraivelaven	1,017	1.34%	
Margin of victory		173	0.23%	−6.96%
Turnout		75,627	71.60%	2.32%
Registered electors		107,743		
DMK gain from AIADMK		Swing	13.32%	

=== 1977 ===
1977 Tamil Nadu Legislative Assembly election: Thirunavalur
Party	Candidate	Votes	%	±%
AIADMK	L. Arumugam	24,087	34.96%	
DMK	V. Subramanian	19,132	27.77%	
INC	K. Ramamoorthi	12,257	17.79%	
JP	C. Lakshminarayanan	7,479	10.86%	
Independent	A. Yesadian	3,862	5.61%	
Independent	C. Krishnaswamy	761	1.10%	
Independent	S. A. Gopalakrishnan	714	1.04%	
Independent	A. Veeraswamy	357	0.52%	
Independent	E. Narasimha Naidu	248	0.36%	
Margin of victory		4,955	7.19%	
Turnout		68,897	69.27%	
Registered electors		101,702		
AIADMK win (new seat)				
