= B. M. Mubarak =

Indian politician

Member of the Tamil Nadu Legislative Assembly
- In office 1996 - 2001
- Preceded by: K. R. Raju
- Succeeded by: A. Miller
- Constituency: Gudalur

Personal details
- Political party: Dravida Munnetra Kazhagam

B. M. Mubarak was elected to the Tamil Nadu Legislative Assembly from the Gudalur constituency in the 1996 elections. He was a candidate of the Dravida Munnetra Kazhagam (DMK) party.

Mubarak was chief whip for the DMK between 1996–2001 and unsuccessfully stood again for election to the Assembly in the 2016 elections. On that occasion he contested the Coonoor constituency. The seat had long been held by the DMK but supporters of the incumbent, K. Ramachandran, had threatened to rebel after he was deselected in favour of Mubarak, who had also been given the post of district secretary of the party in Nilgiris. Ramachandran had been stripped of that district secretary office in 2014.

== Elections Contested ==
=== Tamil Nadu Legislative Assembly Elections ===
Elections	Constituency	Party	Result	Vote percentage	Opposition candidate	Opposition party	Opposition vote percentage
1996 Tamil Nadu Legislative Assembly election	Gudalur	DMK	Won	59.43	K. R. Raju	AIADMK	22.35
2016 Tamil Nadu Legislative Assembly election	Coonoor	DMK	Lost	42.96	Ramu. A	AIADMK	45.71
