= J. Matha Gowder =

Indian politician

J. Matha Gowder was an Indian politician and former Member of the Legislative Assembly of Tamil Nadu. He was elected to the Tamil Nadu legislative assembly as an Indian National Congress candidate from Coonoor constituency in 1957, and 1962 elections.

He was also Member of Parliament elected from Tamil Nadu. He was elected to the Lok Sabha from Nilgiris constituency as a Dravida Munnetra Kazhagam candidate in 1971 election.
