= Pon Jayaseelan =

Indian politician (born 1973)

Pon. Jayseelan

Member of the Tamil Nadu Legislative Assembly
- In office 12 May 2021 – 4 May 2026
- Preceded by: M. Thiravidamani
- Constituency: Gudalur

Personal details
- Born: 3 June 1973 (age 53)
- Party: All India Anna Dravida Munnetra Kazhagam
- Parent: Ponniah (father)
- Occupation: Politician

Ponniah Jayaseelan is an Indian politician. He is a member of the All India Anna Dravida Munnetra Kazhagam party. He was elected as a member of Tamil Nadu Legislative Assembly from Gudalur Constituency in May 2021.

== Elections contested ==
=== Tamil Nadu Legislative Assembly Elections ===
Elections	Constituency	Party	Result	Vote percentage	Opposition candidate	Opposition party	Opposition vote percentage
2021 Tamil Nadu Legislative Assembly election	Gudalur	AIADMK	Won	47.00	S. Kasilingam	DMK	45.58
