= M. Thiravidamani =

Indian politician

Munniyandi Thiravidamani is an Indian politician and incumbent member of the Tamil Nadu Legislative Assembly from the Gudalur constituency. He represents the Dravida Munnetra Kazhagam party.

== Birth and early life ==
M.Thiravidamani was born on 15 January 1960 in the village of Attikunna in The Nilgiris district to Munniyandi and Angammal He had three elder siblings. He started schooling in attikunna village and high school studies in pandalur and higher secondary in Erumad. He completed a B.A. in History from Tirupur Chikkanna College, an M.A. in History from Salem Government Arts College, and a Bachelor of Law from Coimbatore Law College and practiced as an advocate in Gudalur court. From his teenage itself he is active member of Dravida Munnetra Kazhagam.

== Family ==
He was married to Santhi. She was working as an P.G. teacher in government higher secondary school devala. His first son Vijayasuriyan studying 4th year MBBS in Karpaga vinayaga medical college chengalpattu. His second son Abinandhan completed BA English from loyalo college of arts and science.

== Political career ==
From his teenage itself he is an active member of Dravida Munnetra Kazhagam. He worked as special public prosecutor in 1996, Chief General committee member Dravida Munnetra kazhagam,

Dravida Munnetra kazhagam Municipality secretary Nelliyalam Municipality, And 2011 Tamil Nadu assembly election he got ticket to contest in election from Gudalur assembly constituency and He won in the election and he became MLA, In 2014 he was appointed as chief executive committee member Dravida Munnetra kazhagam. In 2016 election also he got ticket and again he won in the election.

== Elections Contested ==
=== Tamil Nadu Legislative Assembly Elections ===
Elections	Constituency	Party	Result	Vote percentage	Opposition candidate	Opposition party	Opposition vote percentage
2011 Tamil Nadu Legislative Assembly election	Gudalur	DMK	Won	58.67	S. Selvaraj	DMDK	29.12
2016 Tamil Nadu Legislative Assembly election	Gudalur	DMK	Won	47.39	S. Kalaiselvan	AIADMK	37.19
2026 Tamil Nadu Legislative Assembly election	Gudalur	DMK	Won	43.37	Pon Jayaseelan	AIADMK	28.27
