= K. Kallan =

Indian politician

K. Kallan is an Indian politician and former Member of the Legislative Assembly of Tamil Nadu. He was elected to the Tamil Nadu legislative assembly as an Indian National Congress (Indira) candidate from Udagamandalam constituency in 1980 election, and as an Indian National Congress candidate 1984 election.
