= K. Hutchi Gowder =

Indian politician

K. Hutchi Gowder was an Indian politician. He was the member of Tamil Nadu legislative assembly. He was elected three times from Gudalur constituency. He died due to several health complications and his funeral took place in his home town Kookal near Kotagiri.
