= M. Bhojarajan =

Indian politician

Member of the Tamil Nadu Legislative Assembly
- Incumbent
- Assumed office 6 May 2026
- Preceded by: R. Ganesh
- Constituency: Udhagamandalam

Personal details
- Born: 1946 (age 79–80)
- Party: Bharatiya Janata Party
- Parent: R. Muthaiah (father)
- Education: Madras Law College (L.L.B); Madras Medical College (Diploma in Criminology); Government Arts College, Ooty (B.A)
- Occupation: Agricultural planter, businessman, Advocate

Muthaiah Bhojarajan (born 1946) is an Indian politician from Bharatiya Janata Party who is a Member of the Legislative Assembly of Tamil Nadu. He was elected to 17th Tamil Nadu Assembly from Udagamandalam Assembly constituency in 2026 election. He had earlier contested in same constituency in 2021 election, but lost to R. Ganesh of Congress by 5,348 votes.

== Biography ==
Bhojarajan hails from the Nilgiris and has a long association with the region's tea economy.

Bhojarajan studied at Government Arts College in Ooty before pursuing law at Madras Law College and a diploma in criminology from Madras Medical College.

After having earlier links with the Congress, He joined BJP around 2014.

== Elections contested ==
2026 Tamil Nadu Legislative Assembly election: Udhagamandalam
Party	Candidate	Votes	%	±%
BJP	M. Bhojarajan	48,488	32.61	▼10.46
TVK	R. Ibrahim	47,512	31.95	New
INC	B. Ramachandran	45,658	30.70	▼16.20
NTK	B. Ragupathy	4,641	3.12	▼1.45
NOTA	None of the above	1,525	1.03	▲0.05
Independent	R. Manian	462	0.31	New
TVK	R. Saveetha	418	0.28	New
Margin of victory		976	0.66	▼3.17
Turnout		1,48,704	78.69	▲10.82
Registered electors		1,88,968		
BJP gain from INC		Swing	▼10.46	

2021 Tamil Nadu Legislative Assembly election: Udhagamandalam
Party	Candidate	Votes	%	±%
INC	R. Ganesh	65,530	46.90	−1.44
BJP	M. Bhojarajan	60,182	43.07	+38.92
NTK	A. Jayakumar	6,381	4.57	+4.03
MNM	Dr. S. Suresh Babu	4,935	3.53	New
NOTA	NOTA	1,376	0.98	−1.09
AMMK	T. Lakshmanan	1,273	0.91	New
Margin of victory		5,348	3.83	−3.61
Turnout		139,726	67.87	−1.21
Rejected ballots		357	0.26	
Registered electors		205,882		
INC hold		Swing	-1.44	
