= Budhichandhiran =

Indian politician

Budhichandhiran is an Indian politician and was a member of the 14th Tamil Nadu Legislative Assembly from Udagamandalam constituency. He represented the All India Anna Dravida Munnetra Kazhagam party.

Budhichandhiran was sacked as Minister for Food in November 2011 as part of the third cabinet reshuffle in a five-month period by Chief Minister Jayalalithaa. He had allegedly been favouring one particular tribe over others.

The elections of 2016 resulted in his constituency being won by R. Ganesh.
