= R. Prabhu =

Indian politician

Minister of State for Agriculture Minister of State for chemicals and Fertilizers Government of India
- In office 16 April 1987 – 23 March 1989

Member of Parliament Lok Sabha Nilgiris
- In office 2004–2009
- In office 1980–1996

Personal details
- Born: 31 May 1947 (age 79) Madras, British Raj
- Party: Indian National Congress
- Spouse: Anita
- Children: 1 son
- As of 22 September, 2006

Ramakrishnan Prabhu (born 31 May 1947) was an Indian National Congress member of Parliament in India, representing the Nilgiris (Ooty) constituency of Tamil Nadu. He was elected from Nilgiris five times since 1980 and one time Union Minister in Rajiv Gandhi cabinet.

== Family ==
R. Prabhu was born on 31 May 1947 to Coimbatore-based educationalist and industrialist P. R. Ramakrishnan and R. Rajeshwari. His father P. R. Ramakrishnan was the first Indian Alumni of MIT Sloan School of Management and a graduate of Massachusetts Institute of Technology, United States who founded Madras Aluminum Company, South India Viscose, Coimbatore Institute of Technology and many other textile industries and two-time Member of Parliament representing Indian National Congress from Coimbatore for the 3rd Lok Sabha during the 1962 General Elections and Pollachi for the 2nd Lok Sabha during the 1957 General Elections. He is also the grandson of industrialist and Indian Civil Service officer Velagapudi Ramakrishna, who founded the KCP group of Industries in Chennai on the maternal side.

== Education ==
R. Prabhu completed his graduation in mechanical engineering from Madras University with honours and was a university gold medalist. He later completed his Master of Science from Massachusetts Institute of Technology.

== Political career ==
He was a five-term Member of Parliament, representing the Nilgiris (Ooty) constituency of Tamil Nadu, India. He also held several ministerial posts and membership in parliamentary committees and ministries.

=== Elections Contested ===
Election	Constituency	Party	Result	Vote %	Opposition Candidate	Opposition Party	Opposition vote %
1980 Indian general election	Nilgiris	INC (I)	Won	57.18	K. R. Subbian	JP	39.26
1984 Indian general election	Nilgiris	INC	Won	60.31	C. T. Dhandapani	DMK	37.03
1989 Indian general election	Nilgiris	INC	Won	61.49	S. A. Mahalingam	DMK	38.03
1991 Indian general election	Nilgiris	INC	Won	58.75	S. Duraisamy	DMK	31.35
1996 Indian general election	Nilgiris	INC	Lost	25.68	S. R. Balasubramaniam	TMC(M)	62.91
1998 Indian general election	Nilgiris	INC	Lost	15.35	Master Mathan	BJP	46.49
1999 Indian general election	Nilgiris	INC	Lost	47.44	Master Mathan	BJP	50.73
2004 Indian general election	Nilgiris	INC	Won	63.28	Master Mathan	BJP	32.99
2009 Indian general election	Coimbatore	INC	Lost	30.94	P. R. Natarajan	CPI(M)	35.64
2014 Indian general election	Coimbatore	INC	Lost	4.91	A.P. Nagarajan	AIADMK	37.24

=== Positions held ===
Indian General Election Year	Lok Sabha	Parliamentary Constituency	Political party	Additional political office	Status	Prime Minister
1980	7th Lok Sabha	Nilgiris	Indian National Congress		Ruling	Indira Gandhi
1984	8th Lok Sabha	Nilgiris	Indian National Congress	Minister of State, Agriculture (Dept. of Fertilisers)	Ruling	Rajiv Gandhi
1989	9th Lok Sabha	Nilgiris	Indian National Congress	Member, Consultative Committee, Ministry of Finance	Opposition	V. P. Singh, Chandra Shekhar
1991	10th Lok Sabha	Nilgiris	Indian National Congress	Member, Committee on Science and technology, Consultative Committee (Ministry of Finance) and Committee on Petroleum and Natural Gas	Ruling	P. V. Narasimha Rao
2004	14th Lok Sabha	Nilgiris	Indian National Congress	Member, Committee on Energy	Ruling	Dr. Manmohan Singh

== Links ==
- Official Website
