= P. Mohan Kandaswamy =

Indian politician

Member of the Tamil Nadu Legislative Assembly
- In office 1996 – 2001
- Preceded by: S. R. Balasubramaniam
- Succeeded by: P. V. Damodaran
- Constituency: Pongalur

Personal details
- Born: 31 December 1933 Bodipalayam, Madukkarai, Coimbatore
- Died: 7 November 2008 (aged 74)
- Party: Tamil Maanila Congress (Moopanar)
- Children: 2 Children

P. Mohan Kandaswamy was an Indian politician and former Member of the Legislative Assembly of Tamil Nadu. He was elected to the Tamil Nadu legislative assembly as a Tamil Maanila Congress party candidate from Pongalur constituency in the 1996 election. He was born in Coimbatore district. Founder of Kids Club groups of school Tirupur.
