= A. J. Manikannan =

Indian politician

Member of the Tamil Nadu Legislative Assembly
- Incumbent
- Assumed office 12 May 2021
- Preceded by: R. Kumaraguru
- Constituency: Ulundurpet

Personal details
- Party: Dravida Munnetra Kazhagam
- Parent: Jayaraman (father)

A. Jayaraman Manikannan is an Indian politician who is a Member of the Legislative Assembly of Tamil Nadu. He was elected to the Tamil Nadu legislative assembly as a Dravida Munnetra Kazhagam candidate from Ulundurpet in 2021 and also from Thirunavalur constituency in the 1996 election. He contested the seat again in the 2001 elections and came second to K. G. P. Gnanamoorthy of the All India Anna Dravida Munnetra Kazhagam. He has been a loyal candidate of DMK and dispersed his duties in good will of the society.

== Elections contested ==
Election	Constituency	Party	Result	Vote %	Runner-up	Runner-up Party	Runner-up vote %
2021 Tamil Nadu Legislative Assembly election	Ulundurpet	DMK	Won	51.27%	R. Kumaraguru	AIADMK	39.81%
2001 Tamil Nadu Legislative Assembly election	Thirunavalur	DMK	Lost	39.39%	K. G. P. Gnanamoorthy	AIADMK	52.51%
1996 Tamil Nadu Legislative Assembly election	Thirunavalur	DMK	Won	41.28%	K. G. P. Gnanamoorthy	AIADMK	29.61%
