= Pongalur Assembly constituency =

Legislative assembly constituency

Coordinates: 10.97°N 77.37°E

Pongalur
- Former constituency for the Tamil Nadu Legislative Assembly

Constituency details
- Country: India
- Region: South India
- State: Tamil Nadu
- District: Coimbatore
- Lok Sabha constituency: Pollachi
- Established: 1967
- Abolished: 2008
- Total electors: 154,491

Pongalur was a legislative assembly constituency in Coimbatore district, which included the city, Pongalur. Pongalur Assembly constituency was part of Pollachi Lok Sabha constituency.

This constituency included Pongalur and Sultanpet unions in (then) Palladam taluk; and Kundadam union in Dharapuram taluk.

== Members of the Legislative Assembly ==
Election	Assembly	Duration	Winner	Party
1967	Fourth	1967–1971	P. N. P. Gounder	Dravida Munnetra Kazhagam
1971	Fifth	1971–1977	Pongalur N. Palanisamy	Dravida Munnetra Kazhagam
1977	Sixth	1977–1980	K. Nachimuthu	All India Anna Dravida Munnetra Kazhagam
1980	Seventh	1980–1984	P. Kandaswamy	All India Anna Dravida Munnetra Kazhagam
1984	Eighth	1984–1989	P. Kandaswamy	All India Anna Dravida Munnetra Kazhagam
1989	Ninth	1989–1991	S. R. Balasubramaniam	Indian National Congress
1991	Tenth	1991–1996	S. R. Balasubramaniam	Indian National Congress
1996	Eleventh	1996–2001	P. Mohan Kandaswamy	Tamil Maanila Congress
2001	Twelfth	2001–2006	P. V. Damodaran	All India Anna Dravida Munnetra Kazhagam
2006	Thirteenth	2006–2011	S. Mani	Dravida Munnetra Kazhagam

== Election results ==
Vote share of winning candidates
2006	41.72%
2001	53.56%
1996	53.25%
1991	67.09%
1989	32.25%
1984	57.77%
1980	58.67%
1977	32.56%
1971	59.98%
1967	61.75%

=== 2006 ===
2006 Tamil Nadu Legislative Assembly election: Pongalur
Party	Candidate	Votes	%	±%
DMK	S. Mani	47,702	41.72%	
AIADMK	P. V. Damodaran	47,703	41.73%	−11.89%
DMDK	C. Ramesh	7,867	6.88%	
BJP	P. Uthrakumar	5,915	5.17%	
Independent	S. Govindasamy	2,329	2.04%	
SP	L. Sathishkumar	1,414	1.24%	
Independent	D. Umar Ali	758	0.66%	
Independent	Pon. Karthikeyan	717	0.63%	
Margin of victory		53	0.05%	−20.40%
Turnout		114,351	74.02%	6.11%
Registered electors		154,491		
DMK gain from AIADMK		Swing	-11.84%	

=== 2001 ===
2001 Tamil Nadu Legislative Assembly election: Pongalur
Party	Candidate	Votes	%	±%
AIADMK	P. V. Damodaran	57,139	53.56%	
Independent	K. Chellamuthu	35,324	33.11%	
MDMK	S. Doraisamy	8,436	7.91%	−1.19%
Independent	K. Devaraj	2,570	2.41%	
Tamil Desiyak Katchi	P. Saravana Kankeyan	1,920	1.80%	
Independent	P. Karthikeyan	785	0.74%	
Independent	N. Kanagaraj	509	0.48%	
Margin of victory		21,815	20.45%	−2.10%
Turnout		106,683	67.91%	−3.32%
Registered electors		157,105		
AIADMK gain from TMC(M)		Swing	0.31%	

=== 1996 ===
1996 Tamil Nadu Legislative Assembly election: Pongalur
Party	Candidate	Votes	%	±%
TMC(M)	P. Mohan Kandaswamy	51,827	53.25%	
INC	Thalapathy Murugesan	29,886	30.71%	−36.38%
MDMK	P. R. Selvaraj	8,853	9.12%	
BJP	P. Uthirakumar	3,577	3.68%	−1.71%
Independent	P. Kandaswamy	942	0.97%	
Independent	P. Chinnadurai	433	0.44%	
Independent	P. Nallaswamy	372	0.38%	
Independent	V. P. Mani	336	0.35%	
Independent	S. R. Kumaraswamy	330	0.34%	
Independent	P. Karthikeyan	212	0.22%	
Independent	C. Ramaraj	204	0.21%	
Margin of victory		21,941	22.54%	−20.11%
Turnout		97,324	71.23%	1.80%
Registered electors		146,098		
TMC(M) gain from INC		Swing	-13.84%	

=== 1991 ===
1991 Tamil Nadu Legislative Assembly election: Pongalur
Party	Candidate	Votes	%	±%
INC	S. R. Balasubramaniam	64,588	67.09%	34.83%
DMK	P. Vijayalakshmi	23,526	24.44%	−3.14%
BJP	S. Iianchezhian	5,187	5.39%	
PMK	R. Perumal	1,397	1.45%	
THMM	V. Murugesan	868	0.90%	
Independent	Thiruman	706	0.73%	
Margin of victory		41,062	42.65%	42.20%
Turnout		96,272	69.43%	−7.92%
Registered electors		146,903		
INC hold		Swing	34.83%	

=== 1989 ===
1989 Tamil Nadu Legislative Assembly election: Pongalur
Party	Candidate	Votes	%	±%
INC	S. R. Balasubramaniam	31,691	32.25%	
AIADMK	N. S. Palanisamy	31,251	31.81%	−25.96%
DMK	P. Vijayalakshmi	27,097	27.58%	
AIADMK	K. M. Durairaj	6,923	7.05%	−50.72%
Independent	V. P. Mani	822	0.84%	
Independent	A. Chinnavadambachery Sundarraju	470	0.48%	
Margin of victory		440	0.45%	−18.92%
Turnout		98,254	77.35%	2.90%
Registered electors		130,422		
INC gain from AIADMK		Swing	-25.52%	

=== 1984 ===
1984 Tamil Nadu Legislative Assembly election: Pongalur
Party	Candidate	Votes	%	±%
AIADMK	P. Kandaswamy	46,535	57.77%	−0.91%
Independent	N. S. Palanisamy	30,934	38.40%	
Independent	S. Govindaswamy	864	1.07%	
Independent	K. Marimuthu Gounder	855	1.06%	
Independent	K. Palanisamy	698	0.87%	
Independent	S. Chindanai Thernal	667	0.83%	
Margin of victory		15,601	19.37%	−0.66%
Turnout		80,553	74.46%	10.51%
Registered electors		115,546		
AIADMK hold		Swing	-0.91%	

=== 1980 ===
1980 Tamil Nadu Legislative Assembly election: Pongalur
Party	Candidate	Votes	%	±%
AIADMK	P. Kandaswamy	40,116	58.67%	26.11%
INC	S. R. Balasubramaniam	26,420	38.64%	8.57%
Independent	S. Sinthanai Thendral	1,834	2.68%	
Margin of victory		13,696	20.03%	17.54%
Turnout		68,370	63.95%	3.17%
Registered electors		109,334		
AIADMK hold		Swing	26.11%	

=== 1977 ===
1977 Tamil Nadu Legislative Assembly election: Pongalur
Party	Candidate	Votes	%	±%
AIADMK	K. Nachimuthu	20,324	32.56%	
INC	S. R. Balasubramaniam	18,769	30.07%	
DMK	Pongalur N. Palanisamy	12,944	20.74%	−39.24%
JP	L. Deivasigamani	6,667	10.68%	
Independent	A. Chinna Nachimuthu Gounder	1,720	2.76%	
Independent	S. Muthuswamy	886	1.42%	
Independent	V. Murugan	830	1.33%	
Independent	N. Arumuga Gounder	276	0.44%	
Margin of victory		1,555	2.49%	−27.24%
Turnout		62,416	60.78%	−7.62%
Registered electors		105,180		
AIADMK gain from DMK		Swing	-27.42%	

=== 1971 ===
1971 Tamil Nadu Legislative Assembly election: Pongalur
Party	Candidate	Votes	%	±%
DMK	Pongalur N. Palanisamy	37,178	59.98%	−1.77%
Independent	A. Senapathi	18,747	30.24%	
Socialist Party (India)	Chinnadurai	6,060	9.78%	
Margin of victory		18,431	29.73%	4.05%
Turnout		61,985	68.41%	−3.66%
Registered electors		97,076		
DMK hold		Swing	-1.77%	

=== 1967 ===
1967 Madras Legislative Assembly election: Pongalur
Party	Candidate	Votes	%	±%
DMK	P. N. P. Gounder	38,371	61.75%	
INC	P. S. Rangaswamy	22,414	36.07%	
Independent	S. Gopalswamy	788	1.27%	
Independent	R. Gounder	563	0.91%	
Margin of victory		15,957	25.68%	
Turnout		62,136	72.07%	
Registered electors		90,839		
DMK win (new seat)				
