= T. Karchan Gowder =

Member of the Legislative Assembly, Tamil Nadu Legislative Assembly
- In office 1962–1967
- Preceded by: B. K. Linga Gowder
- Succeeded by: K. Bojan
- Constituency: Udagamandalam

Personal details
- Born: 15 May 1925 Udhagamandalam
- Party: Indian National Congress
- Profession: Agriculture

T. Karchan Gowder was an Indian politician and a former Member of the Legislative Assembly (MLA) of Tamil Nadu. He hailed from the Balachola area in the Nilgiris district. Having completed his school final education at the Aravankadu District Board High School, Karichan Gowder belonged to the Indian National Congress party. He contested and won the 1962 Tamil Nadu Legislative Assembly election from the Udhagamandalam Assembly constituency to become a member of the state assembly.

== Electoral Performance ==
=== 1962 ===
1962 Madras Legislative Assembly election: Udhagamandalam
Party	Candidate	Votes	%	±%
INC	T. Karchan Gowder	32,860	49.57%	−6.99
SWA	K. Bojan	26,278	39.64%	New
CPI	K. Rajan	6,514	9.83%	New
Independent	Verghese Joseph (Babooji)	402	0.61%	New
Margin of victory		6,582	9.93%	−40.24%
Turnout		66,291	67.89%	19.14%
Registered electors		100,904		
INC hold		Swing	-6.99%	
