= T. Gundan =

Indian politician

T. Gundan is an Indian politician and was a Member of the Legislative Assembly. He was elected to the Tamil Nadu legislative assembly as a Dravida Munnetra Kazhagam (DMK) candidate from Udagamandalam constituency in the 1996 election.
