= H. M. Raju =

Indian politician

H. M. Raju (born 1932 - died 1 May 2024) was an Indian politician and former Member of the Legislative Assembly of Tamil Nadu. He was elected to the Tamil Nadu legislative assembly as an Indian National Congress candidate from Udagamandalam constituency in 1989, 1991 and 2001 elections.
