= Master Mathan =

Indian politician (1932–2024)

M Master Mathan

Member of Parliament (Lok Sabha) for Nilgiris
- In office 28 February 1998 – 22 May 2004
- Prime Minister: Atal Bihari Vajpayee
- Preceded by: S. R. Balasubramaniam
- Succeeded by: R. Prabhu

Personal details
- Born: 19 September 1932 Ithalar, Nilgiris district, Madras Presidency, British India
- Died: 26 July 2024 (aged 91) Coimbatore, Tamil Nadu, India
- Party: Bharatiya Janata Party
- Spouse: Smt Saraswathi Mathan
- Children: Two sons and one daughter
- Education: Mathan .G
- Profession: Politician

M Master Mathan (19 September 1932 – 26 July 2024) was an Indian politician of the Bharatiya Janata Party and Badaga leader who served as a member of the Lok Sabha for two terms from 1998 to 1999 and 1999 to 2004. Mathan died in Coimbatore on 26 July 2024, at the age of 91.

== Elections Contested ==
Election	Constituency	Party	Result	Vote %	Opposition Candidate	Opposition Party	Opposition vote %
1991 Indian general election	Nilgiris	BJP	Lost	6.25	R. Prabhu	INC	58.75
1996 Indian general election	Nilgiris	BJP	Lost	4.26	S. R. Balasubramaniam	TMC(M)	62.91
1998 Indian general election	Nilgiris	BJP	Won	46.49	S. R. Balasubramaniam	TMC(M)	37.80
1999 Indian general election	Nilgiris	BJP	Won	50.73	R. Prabhu	INC	47.44
2004 Indian general election	Nilgiris	BJP	Lost	32.99	R. Prabhu	INC	63.28
