= N. Thangavel =

Indian politician

N. Thangavel (died 8 July 1997) was an Indian politician and Member of the Legislative Assembly of Tamil Nadu. He was elected to the Tamil Nadu legislative assembly as a Dravida Munnetra Kazhagam candidate from Coonoor constituency in the 1989, and 1996 elections. The constituency was reserved for candidates from the Scheduled Castes.

Thangavel died on 8 July 1997.
