= R. Ganesh (politician) =

Indian politician

Member of the Tamil Nadu Legislative Assembly
- In office 19 May 2016 – 4 May 2026
- Preceded by: Budhichandhiran
- Succeeded by: M. Bhojarajan
- Constituency: Udhagamandalam

Personal details
- Party: Indian National Congress

R. Ganesh (born 18 April 1963) is an Indian politician who was a Member of Legislative Assembly of Tamil Nadu. He was elected from Udhagamandalam as an Indian National Congress candidate in 2016 and 2021.

== Elections contested ==
Election	Constituency	Party	Result	Vote %	Opposition Candidate	Opposition Party	Opposition vote %
2011 Tamil Nadu Legislative Assembly election	Udhagamandalam	INC	Lost	44.07	Budhichandhiran	ADMK	50.22
2016 Tamil Nadu Legislative Assembly election	Udhagamandalam	INC	Won	48.34	Vinoth	ADMK	40.90
2021 Tamil Nadu Legislative Assembly election	Udhagamandalam	INC	Won	46.90	M. Bhojarajan	BJP	43.07
