= R. Kumaraguru =

Indian politician

Member of the Tamil Nadu Legislative Assembly
- In office 16 May 2011 – 4 May 2021
- Preceded by: K. Thirunavukkarasu
- Succeeded by: A. J. Manikannan
- Constituency: Ulundurpet

Personal details
- Party: All India Anna Dravida Munnetra Kazhagam
- Parent: E. Ramasamy (father)

Ramasamy Kumaraguru is an Indian politician from the All India Anna Dravida Munnetra Kazhagam and member of the Tamil Nadu Legislative Assembly from the Ulundurpet constituency. He has been elected as a member of legislative assembly for the third consecutive time since 2006 assembly elections. He defeated the Vijayakanth, founder of DMDK party during 2016 assembly elections. He represents the Anna Dravida Munnetra Kazhagam party. As an AIADMK candidate in the 2006 elections, he was elected as a member of the Tamil Nadu Legislative Assembly from the Thirunavalur assembly constituency which was eliminated during the constituency reorganization. Later, 2011 to 2016 he contested the Ulundurpet assembly election for the second time in 2016 and won as a member of the assembly after 2016 to 2021. In this election, he defeated the leader of the opposition party, the leader of the DMDK Party of India, Vijayakanth and third time winner of Tamil Nadu Legislative Assembly in Ulundurpet constituency. He later contested the Ulundurpet assembly constituency from 2021 to 2026 on behalf of All India Anna Dravida Munnetra Kazhagam against DMK and lost by a margin of 5,256 votes and 2.17%.

== Posts ==
- He is a MLA from Tirunavalur Assembly constituency in the year of 2006.
- He is a MLA from Ulundurpet Assembly constituency in the year of 2011.
- He is a MLA from Ulundurpet Assembly constituency in the year of 2016.
- He is a District Party Secretary, All India Anna Dravida Munnetra Kazhagam, Kallakurichi District.
- He was elected as a member of the Board of Trustees of Tirumala Tirupati Devasthanam Tamilnadu for two years from 2019 to 2021.

Constituency	Year		Party	Result
Tirunavalur	2006	2011	AIADMK	MLA
Ulundurpet	2011	2016	AIADMK	MLA
Ulundurpet	2016	2021	AIADMK	MLA

== Achievements ==
- While he was a member of the board of trustees of Tirumala Tirupati Devastham, he arranged for the construction of a small Tirupati temple in the image of Tirupati at Ulundurpet by donating own land.
- Kallakurichi was created as a new district.
- Due to his work, a new medical college was established in Kallakurichi district
- Asia's largest cattle park has been developed near Kallakurichi district.

== Personal life ==
- He was born on 30 July 1961 as the fourth member of Mr. Ramasamy in the village of Ethakkal in A. Chatanur Panchayat of Tiruppayer Post in Ulundurpet Taluk of Tamil Nadu.
- Spouse(s): Mayilmani Kumaraguru
- Children: One Son & One Daughter
- Son: K.Namachivayam
- Daughter: Elakkiya
- Parents: E.Ramasamy (Father)
- Residence(s): Kandasamipuram(East), Ulundurpet, Kallakurichi District, Tamilnadu.

== Elections contested and positions held ==
Electoral	Constituency	Party	Result	Votes %	Runner up	Party	Result	Vote %	Note
2006	Tirunavalur	AIADMK	Win	45.49	V.S.Veerapandiyan	DMK	Failure	40.57	
2011	Ulundurpet	AIADMK	Win	60.09	Muhammed Yusaf	VCK	Failure	32.08	
2016	Ulundurpet	AIADMK	Win	36.04	A.R.Vasanthavel	DMK	Failure	34.21	
2021	Ulundurpet	AIADMK	Failure	45.00	A.J.Manikkannan	DMK	Win	47.17	
