= Udagamandalam Assembly constituency =

One of the 234 State Legislative Assembly Constituencies in Tamil Nadu, in India

Coordinates: 11.41°N 76.70°E

Udhagamandalam
- Constituency No. 108 for the Tamil Nadu Legislative Assembly

Constituency details
- Country: India
- Region: South India
- State: Tamil Nadu
- District: Nilgiris
- Lok Sabha constituency: Nilgiris
- Established: 1957
- Total electors: 1,88,968

Member of Legislative Assembly
- 17th Tamil Nadu Legislative Assembly
- Incumbent M. Bhojarajan
- Party: BJP
- Alliance: NDA
- Elected year: 2026

Udagamandalam Assembly constituency is a state assembly constituency in Tamil Nadu. Its State Assembly Constituency number is 108. It comes under Nilgiris Lok Sabha constituency. The constituency has been in existence since the 1957 election. It is one of the 234 State Legislative Assembly Constituencies in Tamil Nadu, in India. Elections and winners in the constituency are listed below.

== Members of Legislative Assembly ==
Year	Member	Political party
Madras State
1957	B. K. Linga Gowder	Indian National Congress
1962	T. Karchan Gowder	Indian National Congress
1967	K. Bojan	Swatantra Party
Tamil Nadu
1971	M. Devarajan	Dravida Munnetra Kazhagam
1977	B. Gopalan	All India Anna Dravida Munnetra Kazhagam
1980	K. Kallan	Indian National Congress (I)
1984	K. Kallan	Indian National Congress
1989	H. M. Raju	Indian National Congress
1991	H. M. Raju	Indian National Congress
1996	T. Gundan	Dravida Munnetra Kazhagam
2001	H. M. Raju	Indian National Congress
2006	B. Gopalan	Indian National Congress
2011	Budhichandhiran	All India Anna Dravida Munnetra Kazhagam
2016	R. Ganesh	Indian National Congress
2021	R. Ganesh	Indian National Congress
2026	M. Bhojarajan	Bharatiya Janata Party

== Election results ==
Vote share of winning candidates
2026	32.61%
2021	46.90%
2016	48.34%
2011	50.22%
2006	47.55%
2001	62.67%
1996	70.25%
1991	60.79%
1989	36.76%
1984	62.99%
1980	51.82%
1977	28.94%
1971	56.32%
1967	68.03%
1962	49.57%
1957	56.56%

=== 2026 ===
2026 Tamil Nadu Legislative Assembly election: Udhagamandalam
Party	Candidate	Votes	%	±%
BJP	M. Bhojarajan	48,488	32.61	▼10.46
TVK	R. Ibrahim	47,512	31.95	New
INC	B. Ramachandran	45,658	30.70	▼16.20
NTK	B. Ragupathy	4,641	3.12	▼1.45
NOTA	None of the above	1,525	1.03	▲0.05
Independent	R. Manian	462	0.31	New
TVK	R. Saveetha	418	0.28	New
Margin of victory		976	0.66	▼3.17
Turnout		1,48,704	78.69	▲10.82
Registered electors		1,88,968		
BJP gain from INC		Swing	▼10.46	

=== 2021 ===
2021 Tamil Nadu Legislative Assembly election: Udhagamandalam
Party	Candidate	Votes	%	±%
INC	R. Ganesh	65,530	46.90	−1.44
BJP	M. Bhojarajan	60,182	43.07	+38.92
NTK	A. Jayakumar	6,381	4.57	+4.03
MNM	Dr. S. Suresh Babu	4,935	3.53	New
NOTA	NOTA	1,376	0.98	−1.09
AMMK	T. Lakshmanan	1,273	0.91	New
Margin of victory		5,348	3.83	−3.61
Turnout		139,726	67.87	−1.21
Rejected ballots		357	0.26	
Registered electors		205,882		
INC hold		Swing	-1.44	

=== 2016 ===
2016 Tamil Nadu Legislative Assembly election: Udhagamandalam
Party	Candidate	Votes	%	±%
INC	R. Ganesh	67,747	48.34	+4.27
AIADMK	Vinoth	57,329	40.90	−9.31
BJP	Raman	5,818	4.15	+1.94
DMDK	K. King Narcissus	3,111	2.22	New
NOTA	NOTA	2,912	2.08	New
PMK	M. Balraj	781	0.56	New
NTK	R. Jagan	748	0.53	New
Margin of victory		10,418	7.43	1.28
Turnout		140,155	69.08	−2.21
Registered electors		202,898		
INC gain from AIADMK		Swing	-1.88	

=== 2011 ===
2011 Tamil Nadu Legislative Assembly election: Udhagamandalam
Party	Candidate	Votes	%	±%
AIADMK	Budhichandhiran	61,605	50.22	+7.43
INC	R. Ganesh	54,060	44.07	−3.48
BJP	B. Kumaran	2,716	2.21	+0.65
Independent	D. Selvaraj	1,743	1.42	New
Margin of victory		7,545	6.15	1.39
Turnout		122,675	71.29	7.81
Registered electors		172,086		
AIADMK gain from INC		Swing	2.67	

=== 2006 ===
2006 Tamil Nadu Legislative Assembly election: Udhagamandalam
Party	Candidate	Votes	%	±%
INC	B. Gopalan	45,551	47.55	−15.12
AIADMK	K. N. Dorai	40,992	42.79	New
DMDK	J. Benjamin Jacob	4,963	5.18	New
BJP	R. Murugesan	1,499	1.56	−30.65
AIFB	J. Anand Kumar	932	0.97	New
Independent	A. Sasi Kumar	758	0.79	New
Independent	R. Krishnan	498	0.52	New
Margin of victory		4,559	4.76	−25.69
Turnout		95,797	63.48	11.81
Registered electors		150,906		
INC hold		Swing	-15.12	

=== 2001 ===
2001 Tamil Nadu Legislative Assembly election: Udhagamandalam
Party	Candidate	Votes	%	±%
INC	H. M. Raju	59,872	62.67	+40.01
BJP	J. Hutchi Gowder	30,782	32.22	+30.08
JP	M. Alwas	1,606	1.68	New
Independent	Sri Hari K	1,067	1.12	New
JD(S)	H. T. Bojan	1,033	1.08	New
Independent	K. N. K. Nanjundan	626	0.66	New
Margin of victory		29,090	30.45	−17.15
Turnout		95,538	51.67	−11.48
Registered electors		184,958		
INC gain from DMK		Swing	-7.58	

=== 1996 ===
1996 Tamil Nadu Legislative Assembly election: Udhagamandalam
Party	Candidate	Votes	%	±%
DMK	T. Gundan	69,636	70.25	+38.93
INC	H. M. Raju	22,456	22.65	−38.14
JD	N. Chickiah	4,245	4.28	New
BJP	V. Gopalakrishnan	2,117	2.14	−3.02
Margin of victory		47,180	47.60	18.12
Turnout		99,128	63.15	6.44
Registered electors		165,251		
DMK gain from INC		Swing	9.46	

=== 1991 ===
1991 Tamil Nadu Legislative Assembly election: Udhagamandalam
Party	Candidate	Votes	%	±%
INC	H. M. Raju	53,389	60.79	+24.03
DMK	H. Natraj	27,502	31.31	−4.61
BJP	N. Krishnappa Advocate	4,527	5.15	New
Independent	Neelamalai Raja	1,251	1.42	New
Margin of victory		25,887	29.47	28.64
Turnout		87,827	56.71	−12.98
Registered electors		159,035		
INC hold		Swing	24.03	

=== 1989 ===
1989 Tamil Nadu Legislative Assembly election: Udhagamandalam
Party	Candidate	Votes	%	±%
INC	H. M. Raju	35,541	36.76	−26.23
DMK	T. Gundan	34,735	35.93	+0.48
AIADMK	N. Gangadaran	19,281	19.94	New
Independent	Neelamalai Raja	5,248	5.43	New
Independent	A. Mohamed Azam	513	0.53	New
Independent	V. Longanathan	503	0.52	New
Margin of victory		806	0.83	−26.71
Turnout		96,683	69.69	0.59
Registered electors		141,234		
INC hold		Swing	-26.23	

=== 1984 ===
1984 Tamil Nadu Legislative Assembly election: Udhagamandalam
Party	Candidate	Votes	%	±%
INC	K. Kallan	52,145	62.99	+11.17
DMK	S. A. Mahalingam	29,345	35.45	New
Independent	K. Belli	1,293	1.56	New
Margin of victory		22,800	27.54	13.10
Turnout		82,783	69.11	6.93
Registered electors		124,026		
INC hold		Swing	11.17	

=== 1980 ===
1980 Tamil Nadu Legislative Assembly election: Udhagamandalam
Party	Candidate	Votes	%	±%
INC	K. Kallan	35,528	51.82	+36.55
AIADMK	B. Gopalan	25,628	37.38	+8.44
JP	N. Chickiah	7,184	10.48	New
Margin of victory		9,900	14.44	14.23
Turnout		68,560	62.18	1.22
Registered electors		111,534		
INC gain from AIADMK		Swing	22.88	

=== 1977 ===
1977 Tamil Nadu Legislative Assembly election: Udhagamandalam
Party	Candidate	Votes	%	±%
AIADMK	B. Gopalan	18,134	28.94	New
DMK	K. Karuppasamy	18,005	28.74	−27.58
JP	A. Manian	16,946	27.05	New
INC	M. B. Raman	9,567	15.27	New
Margin of victory		129	0.21	−21.69
Turnout		62,652	60.95	−8.73
Registered electors		104,067		
AIADMK gain from DMK		Swing	-27.37	

=== 1971 ===
1971 Tamil Nadu Legislative Assembly election: Udhagamandalam
Party	Candidate	Votes	%	±%
DMK	M. Devarajan	28,901	56.32	New
SWA	M. B. Nanjan	17,662	34.42	New
Independent	M. B. Raman	2,312	4.51	New
Independent	N. Bojan	1,388	2.70	New
Independent	A. R. Md. Ismail	677	1.32	New
Independent	G. Yovan	378	0.74	New
Margin of victory		11,239	21.90	−14.16
Turnout		51,318	69.68	−5.70
Registered electors		79,000		
DMK gain from SWA		Swing	-11.71	

=== 1967 ===
1967 Madras Legislative Assembly election: Udhagamandalam
Party	Candidate	Votes	%	±%
SWA	K. Bojan	37,525	68.03	New
INC	T. K. Gowder	17,636	31.97	−17.6
Margin of victory		19,889	36.06	26.13
Turnout		55,161	75.39	7.49
Registered electors		74,843		
SWA gain from INC		Swing	18.46	

=== 1962 ===
1962 Madras Legislative Assembly election: Udhagamandalam
Party	Candidate	Votes	%	±%
INC	T. Karchan	32,860	49.57	−6.99
SWA	K. Bojan	26,278	39.64	New
CPI	K. Rajan	6,514	9.83	New
Independent	Verghese Joseph (Babooji)	402	0.61	New
Margin of victory		6,582	9.93	−40.24
Turnout		66,291	67.89	19.14
Registered electors		100,904		
INC hold		Swing	-6.99	

=== 1957 ===
1957 Madras Legislative Assembly election: Udhagamandalam
Party	Candidate	Votes	%	±%
INC	B. K. Linga Gowder	22,595	56.56	New
Independent	S. M. Sanjeevi Raju	2,556	6.40	New
Margin of victory		20,039	50.16	
Turnout		39,947	48.76	
Registered electors		81,929		
INC win (new seat)				
