= M. Kandaswamy Padayachi =

Indian politician

Muthulinga Kandaswamy Padayachi was an Indian politician and former Member of the Legislative Assembly of Tamil Nadu.His father V.Muthulinga Padayachi was Thirukovilur Taluk Board President and South Arcot District Board Member. He was elected to the Tamil Nadu legislative assembly as an Indian National Congress candidate from Ulundurpet constituency in 1952, 1957 and 1967 elections. A wide area in Ulundhurpet named after him as "Kandaswamypuram". The street where his descendants live was renamed to "Kandaswamy Padayachi Theru".

Kandasamy Padayachi, a landlord who donated his lands for Government institutions like ITI, Government School, FSCS (Co-operative Society), etc. Padayachi was a harbinger of change in governance, politics, even his personal life. Only person holds 27+ honorary posts in district.
