= C. Krishnan =

C. Krishnan may refer to:

- C. Krishnan (born 1936), member of the 14th Lok Sabha of India
- Palbakki C. Krishnan, Indian politician and former member of the Tamil Nadu Legislative Assembly
- C. Krishnan (Kanyakumari MLA), Indian politician and former Member of the Legislative Assembly
- C. Krishnan (born 1949), Indian politician
