= K. G. P. Gnanamoorthy =

Indian politician

K. G. P. Gnanamoorthy is an Indian politician and was a Member of the Legislative Assembly of Tamil Nadu. He was elected to the Tamil Nadu legislative assembly as an All India Anna Dravida Munnetra Kazhagam (AIADMK) candidate from Thirunavalur constituency in the 2001 election.
