= Coonoor Assembly constituency =

State Legislative Assembly Constituency in Tamil Nadu, India

Coordinates: 11.35°N 76.82°E

Coonoor
- Constituency No. 110 for the Tamil Nadu Legislative Assembly

Constituency details
- Country: India
- Region: South India
- State: Tamil Nadu
- District: Nilgiris
- Lok Sabha constituency: Nilgiris
- Established: 1957
- Total electors: 1,77,978
- Reservation: None

Member of Legislative Assembly
- 17th Tamil Nadu Legislative Assembly
- Incumbent M. Raju
- Party: DMK
- Elected year: 2026

Coonoor is a state assembly constituency in Nilgiris district in Tamil Nadu. Its State Assembly Constituency number is 110. It comes under Nilgiris Lok Sabha constituency. It is a Scheduled Caste reserved constituency. It is one of the 234 State Legislative Assembly Constituencies in Tamil Nadu, in India.

== Members of Legislative Assembly ==
Year	Member	Political party
Madras State
1957	J. Matha Gowder	Indian National Congress
1962	J. Matha Gowder	Indian National Congress
1967	B. Gowder	Dravida Munnetra Kazhagam
Tamil Nadu
1971	J. Karunainathan	Dravida Munnetra Kazhagam
1977	K. Rangasamy	Dravida Munnetra Kazhagam
1980	M. Ranganathan	Dravida Munnetra Kazhagam
1984	M. Sivakumar	All India Anna Dravida Munnetra Kazhagam
1989	N. Thangavel	Dravida Munnetra Kazhagam
1991	M. Karuppasamy	All India Anna Dravida Munnetra Kazhagam
1996	N. Thangavel	Dravida Munnetra Kazhagam
1997	M. Ranganathan	Dravida Munnetra Kazhagam
2001	K. Kandaswamy	Tamil Maanila Congress
2006	A. Soundarapandian	Dravida Munnetra Kazhagam
2011	K. Ramachandran	Dravida Munnetra Kazhagam
2016	A. Ramu	All India Anna Dravida Munnetra Kazhagam
2021	K. Ramachandran	Dravida Munnetra Kazhagam
2026	M. Raju	Dravida Munnetra Kazhagam

== Election results ==
=== 2026 ===
2026 Tamil Nadu Legislative Assembly election: Coonoor
Party	Candidate	Votes	%	±%
DMK	M. Raju	50,470	35.69	▼10.20
AIADMK	A. Ramu	42,371	29.97	▼12.87
TVK	C. Thangaraju	42,225	29.86	New
NTK	K. Deenu	4,695	3.32	▼2.06
NOTA	NOTA	720	0.51	▼0.37
Independent	C. Dinesh Kumar	573	0.41	New
Independent	D. Vidhyasagar	340	0.24	New
Margin of victory		8,099	5.72	▲2.67
Turnout		1,41,394	79.44	▲9.24
Registered electors		1,77,978		▼13,935
DMK hold		Swing	▼10.20	

=== 2021 ===
2021 Tamil Nadu Legislative Assembly election: Coonoor
Party	Candidate	Votes	%	±%
DMK	K. Ramachandran	61,820	45.89%	2.93%
AIADMK	Vinoth. D.	57,715	42.84%	−2.87%
NTK	Lavanya. M.	7,252	5.38%	4.77%
MNM	Rajakumar. H. B.	3,621	2.69%	
AMMK	Kalaiselvan. S.	2,527	1.88%	
NOTA	Nota	1,188	0.88%	−0.81%
Margin of victory		4,105	3.05%	0.30%
Turnout		1,34,720	70.20%	−1.51%
Rejected ballots		123	0.09%	
Registered electors		1,91,913		
DMK gain from AIADMK		Swing	0.18%	

=== 2016 ===
2016 Tamil Nadu Legislative Assembly election: Coonoor
Party	Candidate	Votes	%	±%
AIADMK	Ramu. A.	61,650	45.71%	
DMK	Mubarak. B. M.	57,940	42.96%	−7.70%
DMDK	Chidambaram. V.	3,989	2.96%	
BJP	Kumaran. B.	3,547	2.63%	0.12%
Independent	Dharmaraj. S.	2,319	1.72%	
NOTA	None Of The Above	2,283	1.69%	
NTK	Ramasamy. P.	822	0.61%	
Tamil Nadu Muslim Munnetra Kazagham	Sivakumar. R.	559	0.41%	
PMK	Senthil Kumar. P.	469	0.35%	
Independent	Sekar. M.	390	0.29%	
Independent	Naresh Desingh. D.	343	0.25%	
Margin of victory		3,710	2.75%	−4.93%
Turnout		1,34,870	71.71%	−1.36%
Registered electors		1,88,075		
AIADMK gain from DMK		Swing	-4.95%	

=== 2011 ===
2011 Tamil Nadu Legislative Assembly election: Coonoor
Party	Candidate	Votes	%	±%
DMK	K. Ramachandran	61,302	50.66%	3.30%
CPI	Bellie. A	52,010	42.98%	
BJP	Alwas. M	3,040	2.51%	0.70%
Independent	Abdul Wahab	1,231	1.02%	
Independent	Jothilingam. R	871	0.72%	
Independent	Mathivanan. V	803	0.66%	
BSP	Leon Gerald Thilak. M. G.	798	0.66%	0.06%
Independent	Esakkimuthu. V	612	0.51%	
IJK	Lenin. N	348	0.29%	
Margin of victory		9,292	7.68%	1.71%
Turnout		1,65,620	73.07%	8.22%
Registered electors		1,21,015		
DMK hold		Swing	3.30%	

=== 2006 ===
2006 Tamil Nadu Legislative Assembly election: Coonoor
Party	Candidate	Votes	%	±%
DMK	Soundarapandian. A	45,303	47.36%	8.98%
AIADMK	Selvaraj. M	39,589	41.38%	
DMDK	Chidambaram. V	7,227	7.55%	
BJP	Anbarasan (Alias) Anbu. D	1,729	1.81%	
Independent	Ramachandran. P	594	0.62%	
BSP	Theinmathi. P	569	0.59%	
Independent	Annakili. A	405	0.42%	
AIFB	Arumugam. P	250	0.26%	
Margin of victory		5,714	5.97%	−11.52%
Turnout		95,666	64.85%	11.84%
Registered electors		1,47,524		
DMK gain from TMC(M)		Swing	-8.51%	

=== 2001 ===
2001 Tamil Nadu Legislative Assembly election: Coonoor
Party	Candidate	Votes	%	±%
TMC(M)	Kandasamy K	53,156	55.86%	
DMK	Mahaliappan E. M.	36,512	38.37%	−25.90%
MDMK	Vijayakumar R	3,230	3.39%	0.40%
Independent	Vetrivel Sivakumar K	1,546	1.62%	
Independent	Nallasamy M	711	0.75%	
Margin of victory		16,644	17.49%	−18.22%
Turnout		95,155	53.00%	−11.60%
Registered electors		1,79,568		
TMC(M) gain from DMK		Swing	-8.40%	

=== 1996 ===
1996 Tamil Nadu Legislative Assembly election: Coonoor
Party	Candidate	Votes	%	±%
DMK	N. Thangavel	63,919	64.27%	29.41%
AIADMK	Karuppusamy. S.	28,404	28.56%	−30.84%
BJP	Eswaran. T.	3,371	3.39%	−1.43%
MDMK	Selvaraj. S.	2,983	3.00%	
ATMK	Anbalagan. A.	164	0.16%	
Independent	Navaneetham. K.	151	0.15%	
Independent	Dhinakaran. K.	151	0.15%	
Independent	Mani. K. P.	72	0.07%	
Independent	Velusamy. M.	71	0.07%	
Independent	Annadurai. R.	67	0.07%	
Independent	Karuppiah. R.	64	0.06%	
Margin of victory		35,515	35.71%	11.16%
Turnout		99,459	64.61%	4.54%
Registered electors		1,61,044		
DMK gain from AIADMK		Swing	4.87%	

=== 1991 ===
1991 Tamil Nadu Legislative Assembly election: Coonoor
Party	Candidate	Votes	%	±%
AIADMK	Karuppusamy M.	53,608	59.40%	44.25%
DMK	Mahaliappan E. M.	31,457	34.86%	−7.53%
BJP	Shanmugam A.	4,352	4.82%	
PMK	Saradha B.	218	0.24%	
Independent	Komali L.	140	0.16%	
Independent	Mohan K.	139	0.15%	
THMM	Rajeswari S.	119	0.13%	
Independent	Ponnazhagan A.	83	0.09%	
Independent	Kandasamy M.	78	0.09%	
Independent	Veluswamy M.	55	0.06%	
Margin of victory		22,151	24.54%	13.00%
Turnout		90,249	60.07%	−10.84%
Registered electors		1,55,447		
AIADMK gain from DMK		Swing	17.02%	

=== 1989 ===
1989 Tamil Nadu Legislative Assembly election: Coonoor
Party	Candidate	Votes	%	±%
DMK	N. Thangavel	40,974	42.38%	0.27%
INC	Arumugham. P.	29,814	30.84%	
AIADMK	Manimaran. S.	14,648	15.15%	−41.55%
AIADMK	Ponnuraj. T.	10,672	11.04%	−45.66%
Independent	Ponnazhagan. A.	278	0.29%	
Independent	Raju. K.	123	0.13%	
Independent	Ammasan. A.	106	0.11%	
Independent	Veluswami. M.	63	0.07%	
Margin of victory		11,160	11.54%	−3.05%
Turnout		96,678	70.91%	0.33%
Registered electors		1,38,919		
DMK gain from AIADMK		Swing	-14.32%	

=== 1984 ===
1984 Tamil Nadu Legislative Assembly election: Coonoor
Party	Candidate	Votes	%	±%
AIADMK	M. Sivakumar	47,113	56.70%	19.12%
DMK	M. Ranganathan	34,990	42.11%	−14.74%
Independent	Komali	993	1.20%	
Margin of victory		12,123	14.59%	−4.68%
Turnout		83,096	70.58%	16.07%
Registered electors		1,23,350		
AIADMK gain from DMK		Swing	-0.15%	

=== 1980 ===
1980 Tamil Nadu Legislative Assembly election: Coonoor
Party	Candidate	Votes	%	±%
DMK	Ranganathan. M.	34,424	56.85%	14.52%
AIADMK	Periasamy. C.	22,756	37.58%	13.00%
JP	Mahaliappan. E. M.	3,217	5.31%	
Independent	Balasubramaniam. A.	158	0.26%	
Margin of victory		11,668	19.27%	1.51%
Turnout		60,555	54.51%	2.84%
Registered electors		1,12,613		
DMK hold		Swing	14.52%	

=== 1977 ===
1977 Tamil Nadu Legislative Assembly election: Coonoor
Party	Candidate	Votes	%	±%
DMK	K. Rangasamy	22,649	42.33%	−18.51%
AIADMK	C. Periasamy	13,150	24.58%	
INC	K. Chandran	8,829	16.50%	−11.37%
JP	C.P. Krishiah	7,888	14.74%	
Independent	L. Komali	341	0.64%	
Independent	A. Chelliah	257	0.48%	
Independent	M.R. Ramasamy	210	0.39%	
Independent	A. Shanmugam	144	0.27%	
Independent	R. Muthuswamy	37	0.07%	
Margin of victory		9,499	17.75%	−15.21%
Turnout		53,505	51.67%	−17.01%
Registered electors		1,05,169		
DMK hold		Swing	-18.51%	

=== 1971 ===
1971 Tamil Nadu Legislative Assembly election: Coonoor
Party	Candidate	Votes	%	±%
DMK	J. Karunainathan	33,451	60.84%	2.10%
INC	N. Andy	15,325	27.87%	−13.39%
Independent	M. M. Raman	4,354	7.92%	
ABJS	I. Doraiswamy	1,603	2.92%	
Independent	D. R. Bojaraj	129	0.23%	
Independent	A. K. Bheeman	120	0.22%	
Margin of victory		18,126	32.97%	15.50%
Turnout		54,982	68.68%	−5.01%
Registered electors		83,756		
DMK hold		Swing	2.10%	

=== 1967 ===
1967 Madras Legislative Assembly election: Coonoor
Party	Candidate	Votes	%	±%
DMK	B. Gowder	31,855	58.74%	37.46%
INC	M. K. N. Gowder	22,380	41.26%	−10.38%
Margin of victory		9,475	17.47%	−12.90%
Turnout		54,235	73.69%	1.61%
Registered electors		75,716		
DMK gain from INC		Swing	7.09%	

=== 1962 ===
1962 Madras Legislative Assembly election: Coonoor
Party	Candidate	Votes	%	±%
INC	J. Matha Gowder	36,668	51.65%	7.09%
DMK	J. Belli	15,103	21.27%	
CPI	H. B. Devaraj	11,679	16.45%	
SWA	K. N. Bella Gowder	6,849	9.65%	
Independent	V. Kanthian	699	0.98%	
Margin of victory		21,565	30.37%	19.76%
Turnout		70,998	72.08%	1.00%
Registered electors		1,02,319		
INC hold		Swing	7.09%	

=== 1957 ===
1957 Madras Legislative Assembly election: Coonoor
Party	Candidate	Votes	%	±%
INC	J. Matha Gowder	22,113	44.56%	
Independent	H. B. Ari Gowder	16,845	33.94%	
Independent	K. Bhojan	14,796	29.81%	
Independent	V. K. Subramanian	5,174	10.43%	
Independent	D. Singaram	4,440	8.95%	
Independent	J. Hiria Gowder	1,055	2.13%	
Margin of victory		5,268	10.62%	
Turnout		49,627	71.08%	
Registered electors		69,821		
INC win (new seat)				
