= K. Ramachandran =

Indian politician (born 1951)

Minister for Tourism Government of Tamil Nadu
- In office 14 December 2022 – 29 September 2024
- Preceded by: M. Mathiventhan
- Succeeded by: R.Rajendran

Minister for Forests Government of Tamil Nadu
- In office 7 May 2021 – 14 December 2022
- Preceded by: Dindigul C. Sreenivasan
- Succeeded by: M. Mathiventhan

Member of the Tamil Nadu Legislative Assembly
- In office 2 May 2021 – 4 May 2026
- Succeeded by: M. Raju
- Constituency: Coonoor
- In office 23 May 2011 — 21 May 2016
- Constituency: Coonoor
- In office 11 May 2006 — 13 May 2011
- Constituency: Gudalur

Personal details
- Party: Dravida Munnetra Kazhagam

K. Ramachandran (born 9 August 1951) is an Indian politician and the Minister for Forests in Tamil Nadu. He was born in Coonoor.

He was elected to the Tamil Nadu Legislative Assembly as a Dravida Munnetra Kazhagam(DMK) candidate from Gudalur constituency in 2006 and from Coonoor constituency in 2011 and 2021.

He also served as the Minister for Khadi of Tamil Nadu from 2006-2011 in the Cabinet of Dr.M. Karunanidhi.

The Coonoor seat had long been held by the DMK but supporters of Ramachandran were incensed that he was deselected for the 2016 elections and threatened to rebel. The new candidate was B. M. Mubarak, who had also been given the post of district secretary of the party in Nilgiris after Ramachandran had been removed from it in 2014. The DMK lost the seat.

== Elections Contested ==
=== Tamil Nadu Legislative Assembly Elections ===
Elections	Constituency	Party	Result	Vote percentage	Opposition candidate	Opposition party	Opposition vote percentage
2006 Tamil Nadu Legislative Assembly election	Gudalur	DMK	Won	51.72	A. Miller	AIADMK	37.61
2011 Tamil Nadu Legislative Assembly election	Coonoor	DMK	Won	50.66	Bellie. A	CPI	42.98
2021 Tamil Nadu Legislative Assembly election	Coonoor	DMK	Won	45.89	Vinoth. D	AIADMK	42.84
