= Sarabanga River =

Sarabanga Nadhi

Location
- Country: India
- State: Tamil Nadu
- District: Salem
- Cities: Omalur, Tharamangalam, Thoppur, Dhadhapuram, Idappadi, Chettipatti, Peramachipalaym, Thevur

Physical characteristics
- Source
  - location: Pattipadi, Yercaud, Salem; Karadiyoor, Yercaud, Salem
- Mouth
  - location: Pullagoundampatti, Sangagiri, Salem
  - coordinates: 11.511259°N,77.735002°E
  - elevation: 567.58 ft (173.00 m)

Basin features
- River system: Kaveri

The Sarabanga River is a river flowing in the Salem district of the Indian state of Tamil Nadu. The origin of the river is traditionally placed at the Servarayan hills in Tamil Nadu. The river fulfills demands for agricultural irrigation in Danishpet village. The Sarabanga flows through the towns of Danishpet, Omalur, Thoppur, Tharamangalam, Dhadhapuram, Idappadi, Chettipatti, Peramachipalayam, and Thevur, and joins the Kaveri River near Kaniyalampatti, before flowing into the Bay of Bengal. Annamar Kovil, a Hindu temple, stands near the confluence of the two rivers. Dams on the river are located at Peramachipalayam.

== Etymology ==
The river is named after a sage, named Sarabangar, who was seeking penance on the bank of this river.

== Geography ==
There are two tributaries, called Keezhaaru (or, Periyaaru, or, East Sarabanga river) and Melaaru (or, Pattipadu aaru or, Pariyan Kuzhi aaru, or, Kootaaru, or, Kaataaru, or, West Sarabanga river). The two tributaries join together at Omalur to form the Sarbanga River.

The Periyaaru river originates from Pattipadi, Yercaud and is fed from many small streams along the way as it flows westwards. It creates the Kiliyur waterfalls at Kiliyur before reaching the Vattakaadu Eri weir. The river then continues to flow westwards, before joining the Sarabanga river.

The Melaaru starts from the Karadiyoor hills, a part of Servarayan hills, however it flows towards north downhill and leaving the foothill at Attur Chat R.F. on the north-west side. The river then runs through Danishpet, Kadayampatti, Pannapatti before joining the Periyaaru at Omalur.

From Omalur, the Sarabanga river flows south-westwards, passing through K.R. Thoppur, Chinnapampatti, Dhadhapuram, Edappadi, Thevur, while feeding number of lakes. The Sarabanga river joins the Kaveri river in Pullagoundampatti, Salem near Annamar Kovil.

== See also ==
List of rivers of Tamil Nadu
