= Arasiramani =

- Panchayat town
- Location in Tamil Nadu, India
- Coordinates: 11°32′45″N 77°47′19″E
- Country: India
- State: Tamil Nadu
- District: Salem
- Taluk: Sankagiri

Area
  - Total: 28.6 km^{2} (11.0 sq mi)

Population (2011)
  - Total: 14,834
  - Density: 519/km^{2} (1,340/sq mi)

Languages
  - Official: Tamil
- Time zone: UTC+5:30 (IST)

Arasiramani is a panchayat town in Sankari taluk of Salem district in the Indian state of Tamil Nadu. It is one of the 15 panchayat towns in the district. Spread across an area of 28.6 km^{2} (11.0 sq mi), it had a population of 14,834 individuals as per the 2011 census.

== Geography and administration ==
Arasiramani is located in Sankari taluk of Salem district in the Indian state of Tamil Nadu. Spread across an area of 28.6 km^{2} (11.0 sq mi), it is one of the 15 panchayat towns in the district. Established in 1969, the town panchayat is sub-divided into 15 wards. It is headed by a chairperson, who is elected by the members, who are chosen through direct elections. The town forms part of the Sankari Assembly constituency that elects its member to the Tamil Nadu legislative assembly and the Namakkal Lok Sabha constituency that elects its member to the Parliament of India.

== Demographics ==
As per the 2011 census, Arasiramani had a population of14,834 individuals across 3,970 households. The population saw a marginal increase compared to the previous census in 2001 when 13,815 inhabitants were registered. The population consisted of 7,665 males and 7,169 females. About 1,195 individuals were below the age of six years. About 7.2% of the population belonged to scheduled castes. The entire population is classified as urban. The town has an average literacy rate of 63.3%.

About 54.9% of the eligible population were employed, of which majority were involved in agriculture and allied activities. Hinduism was the majority religion which was followed by 99.2% of the population, with Christianity (0.6%) and Islam (0.1%) being minor religions.
