= Sundararajan =

Sundararajan is a given name and surname. People with the name include:

- Pichai Sundararajan (born 1972), Indian–American business executive
- Gowtham Sundararajan, Indian actor and choreographer
- Aruna Sundararajan, Former Telecom Secretary of India
- Major Sundararajan (1935–2003), Indian actor and film director
- Srikanth Sundararajan, Indian innovator, entrepreneur, professor, and investor
- Arun Sundararajan, American economist
- M. Sundararajan, Indian politician
- T P Sundararajan, Indian lawyer
- Govindan Sundararajan, Indian materials engineer
- Krishnaswamy Sundararajan (1928–1999), Chief of the Army Staff of the Indian Army from 1986 to 1988
- S. Sundararajan, Indian politician
- N. S. Sundararajan, Indian politician
- P. G. Sundararajan (1910–2006), Indian writer
- Sundararajan Krishna (1938–2013), Indian cricketer
- Sundararajan Padmanabhan (1940–2024), Indian Army General
- Sundararajan Kidambi (born 1982), Indian chess grandmaster
- Sundararajan (politician), Indian politician

== See also ==
- Sundararajan's awe
- 17084 Sundararajan
