= S. Vetrivel =

Indian politician

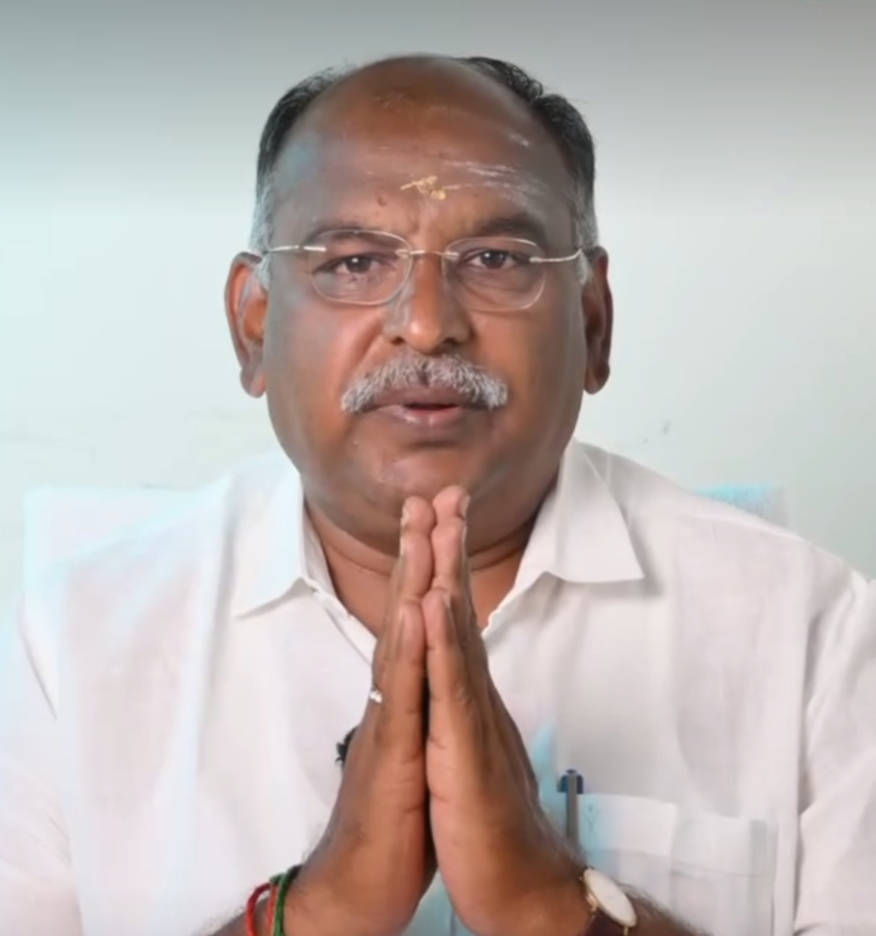

Member of the Tamil Nadu Legislative Assembly
- Incumbent
- Assumed office 11 May 2026
- Preceded by: S. Sundararajan
- Constituency: Sankari
- In office 19 May 2016 – 12 May 2021
- Preceded by: C. Krishnan
- Succeeded by: R. Mani
- Constituency: Omalur

Personal details
- Party: All India Anna Dravida Munnetra Kazhagam

S. Vetrivel is an Indian politician active in Tamil Nadu state. He is currently serving as a Member of Legislative Assembly (MLA) for Omalur in the Tamil Nadu Legislative Assembly. He is the member of the Anna Dravida Munnetra Kazhagam political party (AIADMK), led by Jayalalithaa.

== Early life and education ==
Vetrivel completed his schooling from Little flower School Salem, and he is also a B.A graduate from Sowdeswari College of Arts and Science.

He played for under-14 and 23 for the Tamil Nadu cricket team. He is also a member of Tamil Nadu cricket board selection committee and the Chennai cricket club.

== Political career ==
He is the member of the political party AIADMK from the year 1991. He was the chairman for Karuppur town panchayat from 2011 to 2015. He contested as an AIADMK MLA candidate for Omalur constituency and won with the vote difference of 19,956 and became the member of Tamil Nadu legislative assembly.
