= Deva Pureeswarar Temple =

Coordinates: 10.725874°N 79.731436°E

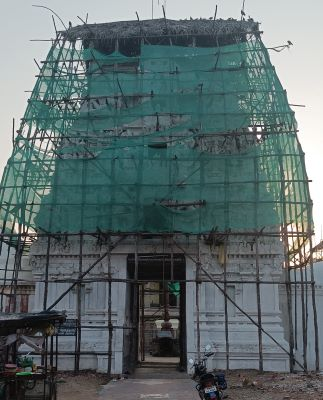

Religion
- Affiliation: Hinduism
- District: Tiruvarur
- Deity: Lord Shiva,

Location
- Location: Thevur
- State: Tamil Nadu
- Country: India
- Interactive map of Deva Pureeswarar Temple

Architecture
- Type: Dravidian architecture

Deva Pureeswarar Temple (தேவபுரீஸ்வரர் கோயில் ) is a Hindu temple in Thevur in the Tiruvarur District of Tamil Nadu, India. The presiding deity is Shiva. The temple is in the village of Thevur near Kilvelur. It is one of the shrines of the 275 Paadal Petra Sthalams.

== Legend ==
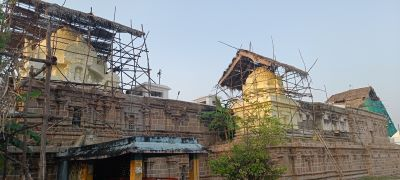
Vimana of the presiding deity

According to Hindu mythology, the Devas worshipped Shiva at Thevur to rid themselves of the sin of killing Vruddhasura. The temple is also associated with the legends of the Ramayana as per which Kubera worshipped Shiva at the Deva Pureeswarar Temple to get back his wealth stolen by Ravana. As per the Mahabharata, Virata worshipped Shiva at the temple along with his son Uttara.

== Significance ==
Praises of the temple have been sung by the Nayanmars, Appar and Sambandar. The temple is frequented by unmarried people and those seeking children.
