= Omalur Assembly constituency =

State Legislative Assembly Constituency in Tamil Nadu

Coordinates: 11°45′10″N 78°00′41″E

Omalur
- Constituency No. 84 for the Tamil Nadu Legislative Assembly

Constituency details
- Country: India
- Region: South India
- State: Tamil Nadu
- District: Salem
- Lok Sabha constituency: Salem
- Established: 1951
- Total electors: 2,94,863
- Reservation: None

Member of Legislative Assembly
- 17th Tamil Nadu Legislative Assembly
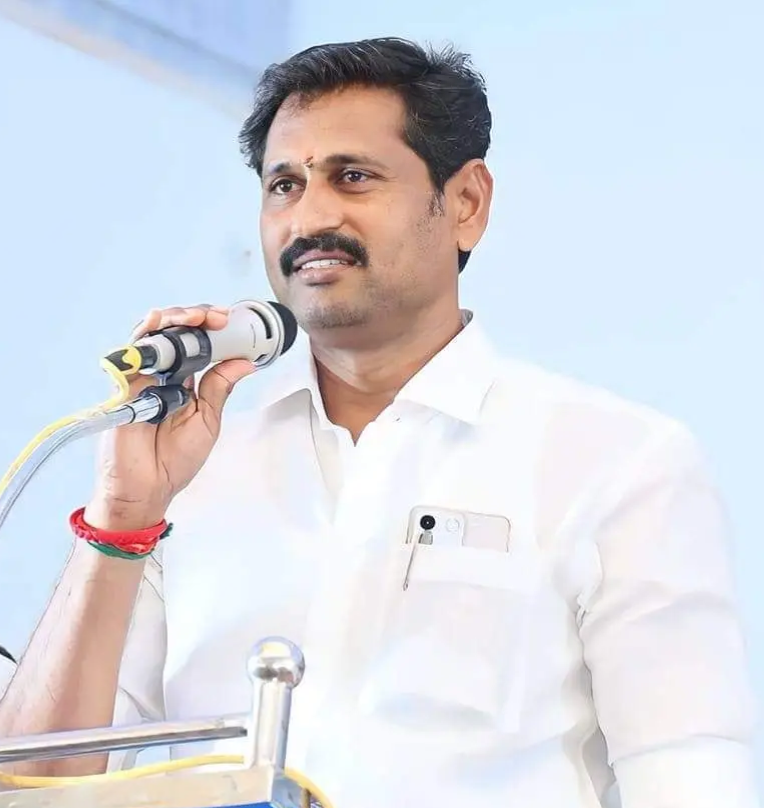
- Incumbent R. Mani
- Party: AIADMK
- Alliance: NDA
- Elected year: 2026

Omalur is a state assembly constituency in Salem district of Tamil Nadu, India. Its State Assembly Constituency number is 84. It comprises a portion of Omalur taluk and forms a part of the wider Salem Lok Sabha constituency for national elections to the Parliament of India. It is one of the 234 State Legislative Assembly Constituencies in Tamil Nadu, in India. Elections and winners in the constituency are listed below. This constituency was temporarily defunct during the elections in 1957 and 1962.

== Members of Legislative Assembly ==
Year	Member	Political party
Madras State
1952	P. Rathinaswami Pillai	Independent
1967	C. Palani	Dravida Munnetra Kazhagam
Tamil Nadu
1971	V. Selladurai	Dravida Munnetra Kazhagam
1977	M. Sivaperumal	All India Anna Dravida Munnetra Kazhagam
1980	M. Sivaperumal	All India Anna Dravida Munnetra Kazhagam
1984	Anbalagan	Indian National Congress
1989	C. Krishnan	All India Anna Dravida Munnetra Kazhagam
1991	C. Krishnan	All India Anna Dravida Munnetra Kazhagam
1996	R. R. Sekaran	Tamil Maanila Congress
2001	S. Semmalai	All India Anna Dravida Munnetra Kazhagam
2006	A. Thamizharasu	Pattali Makkal Katchi
2011	C. Krishnan	All India Anna Dravida Munnetra Kazhagam
2016	S. Vetrivel	All India Anna Dravida Munnetra Kazhagam
2021	R. Mani	All India Anna Dravida Munnetra Kazhagam
2026	R. Mani	All India Anna Dravida Munnetra Kazhagam

== Election results ==
Vote share of winning candidates
2026	41.40%
2021	57.59%
2016	39.23%
2011	59.70%
2006	43.38%
2001	59.39%
1996	40.62%
1991	65.78%
1989	42.35%
1984	66.04%
1980	58.20%
1977	42.69%
1971	60.81%
1967	56.17%
1952	52.07%

=== 2026 ===
2026 Tamil Nadu Legislative Assembly election: Omalur
Party	Candidate	Votes	%	±%
AIADMK	R. Mani	112,246	41.40	▼16.19
TVK	Adhiyamaan. R.V	97,707	36.04	New
DMDK	Elangovan. A.R	46,917	17.30	New
NTK	Sivasakthi. M	8,370	3.09	▼0.72
Independent	Gobinathan. R	1,544	0.57	New
NOTA	NOTA	1,433	0.53	▼0.12
Margin of victory		14,539	5.36	▼16.99
Turnout		2,71,119	91.95	▲8.33
Registered electors		2,94,863		▼1,031
AIADMK hold		Swing	▼16.19	

=== 2021 ===
2021 Tamil Nadu Legislative Assembly election: Omalur
Party	Candidate	Votes	%	±%
AIADMK	R. Mani	142,488	57.59	▲18.36
INC	Rangarajan Mohan Kumaramangalam	87,194	35.24	New
NTK	A. Raja	9,416	3.81	▲3.39
MNM	V. Srinivasan	2,930	1.18	New
NOTA	Nota	1,600	0.65	▼0.12
Tamil Nadu Ilangyar Katchi	M. Karunakaran	1,228	0.50	New
Margin of victory		55,294	22.35	13.57
Turnout		247,427	83.62	−1.86
Rejected ballots		999	0.40	
Registered electors		295,894		
AIADMK hold		Swing	18.36	

=== 2016 ===
2016 Tamil Nadu Legislative Assembly election: Omalur
Party	Candidate	Votes	%	±%
AIADMK	S. Vetrivel	89,169	39.23	▼20.47
DMK	S. Ammasi	69,213	30.45	New
PMK	A. Tamizharasu	48,721	21.44	▼13.48
DMDK	A. R. Elangovan	9,744	4.29	New
NOTA	None Of The Above	1,739	0.77	New
Independent	C. Selvaraj	1,486	0.65	New
Margin of victory		19,956	8.78	−16.01
Turnout		227,295	85.48	2.89
Registered electors		265,892		
AIADMK hold		Swing	-20.47	

=== 2011 ===
2011 Tamil Nadu Legislative Assembly election: Omalur
Party	Candidate	Votes	%	±%
AIADMK	C. Krishnan	112,102	59.70	▲19.05
PMK	A. Tamizharasu	65,558	34.91	▼8.47
BJP	B. Sivaram	2,139	1.14	New
IJK	S. Kandasami	1,863	0.99	New
Independent	P. Ramachandiran	1,840	0.98	New
Independent	C. Selvarasu	1,262	0.67	New
Margin of victory		46,544	24.79	22.06
Turnout		227,342	82.59	11.31
Registered electors		187,770		
AIADMK gain from PMK		Swing	16.32	

=== 2006 ===
2006 Tamil Nadu Legislative Assembly election: Omalur
Party	Candidate	Votes	%	±%
PMK	A. Tamizharasu	58,287	43.38	New
AIADMK	C. Krishnan	54,624	40.66	▼18.73
DMDK	S. Kamalakkannan	12,384	9.22	New
Independent	K. Raja Krishnan	1,600	1.19	New
BSP	M. Sellamuthu	1,264	0.94	New
Independent	G. Tamilarasi	1,127	0.84	New
Independent	R. Murugasenapathy	1,123	0.84	New
Independent	P. Chinnarasu	875	0.65	New
NCP	M. Soundararajan	667	0.50	New
Margin of victory		3,663	2.73	−25.77
Turnout		134,357	71.28	13.72
Registered electors		188,486		
PMK gain from AIADMK		Swing	-16.00	

=== 2001 ===
2001 Tamil Nadu Legislative Assembly election: Omalur
Party	Candidate	Votes	%	±%
AIADMK	S. Semmalai	65,861	59.39	▲26.53
DMK	R. Rajendran	34,259	30.89	New
JP	B. S. Sundararajan	3,235	2.92	New
Independent	K. Murugan	2,250	2.03	New
Independent	P. Nallathambi	1,722	1.55	New
Independent	S. D. Panneer Selvam	897	0.81	New
MDMK	P. Chinnusamy	894	0.81	▼0.72
Margin of victory		31,602	28.49	20.74
Turnout		110,905	57.57	−5.14
Registered electors		192,661		
AIADMK gain from TMC(M)		Swing	18.77	

=== 1996 ===
1996 Tamil Nadu Legislative Assembly election: Omalur
Party	Candidate	Votes	%	±%
TMC(M)	R. R. Sekaran	41,523	40.62	New
AIADMK	C. Krishnan	33,593	32.86	▼32.92
PMK	A. Tamizharasu	24,105	23.58	New
MDMK	A. Sundaram	1,558	1.52	New
Margin of victory		7,930	7.76	−32.67
Turnout		102,232	62.71	1.25
Registered electors		173,907		
TMC(M) gain from AIADMK		Swing	-25.16	

=== 1991 ===
1991 Tamil Nadu Legislative Assembly election: Omalur
Party	Candidate	Votes	%	±%
AIADMK	C. Krishnan	60,783	65.78	▲23.42
PMK	K. Sadasivam	23,430	25.36	New
CPI	K. A. Govindasamy	6,370	6.89	New
BJP	N. Balu	523	0.57	New
JP	P. Manoharan	491	0.53	New
Margin of victory		37,353	40.42	26.67
Turnout		92,406	61.46	7.06
Registered electors		159,123		
AIADMK hold		Swing	23.42	

=== 1989 ===
1989 Tamil Nadu Legislative Assembly election: Omalur
Party	Candidate	Votes	%	±%
AIADMK	C. Krishnan	32,275	42.35	New
DMK	K. Chinnaraju	21,793	28.60	New
INC	K. Anbalagan	11,803	15.49	▼50.55
AIADMK	M. Muthusamy	5,601	7.35	New
Independent	T. Dharman	1,543	2.02	New
Independent	P. K. Ganesan	888	1.17	New
Independent	K. Ayyavoo	616	0.81	New
Margin of victory		10,482	13.76	−22.96
Turnout		76,204	54.40	−13.62
Registered electors		143,933		
AIADMK gain from INC		Swing	-23.69	

=== 1984 ===
1984 Tamil Nadu Legislative Assembly election: Omalur
Party	Candidate	Votes	%	±%
INC	Anbalagan	51,703	66.04	New
CPI	S. Kuppusamy	22,961	29.33	New
Independent	P. Ponnusamy	833	1.06	New
Independent	P. Saminathan	684	0.87	New
Independent	P. K. Karuppannan	539	0.69	New
Independent	O. E. Tamaraiselvi	527	0.67	New
Independent	R. Nagarathinam	476	0.61	New
Margin of victory		28,742	36.71	20.31
Turnout		78,288	68.01	3.72
Registered electors		124,598		
INC gain from AIADMK		Swing	7.84	

=== 1980 ===
1980 Tamil Nadu Legislative Assembly election: Omalur
Party	Candidate	Votes	%	±%
AIADMK	M. Sivaperumal	42,399	58.20	▲15.51
DMK	C. Marimuthu	30,447	41.80	▲23.74
Margin of victory		11,952	16.41	−3.88
Turnout		72,846	64.29	2.85
Registered electors		115,489		
AIADMK hold		Swing	15.51	

=== 1977 ===
1977 Tamil Nadu Legislative Assembly election: Omalur
Party	Candidate	Votes	%	±%
AIADMK	M. Sivaperumal	26,342	42.69	New
JP	M. Govindan	13,824	22.41	New
DMK	C. Marimuthu	11,139	18.05	▼42.76
CPI	S. Kuppuswami	8,263	13.39	New
Independent	O. K. Karunanidhi	1,796	2.91	New
Independent	S. Andiyappan	335	0.54	New
Margin of victory		12,518	20.29	−4.81
Turnout		61,699	61.44	10.42
Registered electors		102,047		
AIADMK gain from DMK		Swing	-18.12	

=== 1971 ===
1971 Tamil Nadu Legislative Assembly election: Omalur
Party	Candidate	Votes	%	±%
DMK	V. Selladurai	26,065	60.81	▲4.64
INC	C. Govindan	15,307	35.71	▲0.01
Independent	A. Naliappan	1,076	2.51	New
Independent	S. M. Kandasamy	414	0.97	New
Margin of victory		10,758	25.10	4.63
Turnout		42,862	51.02	−11.41
Registered electors		92,532		
DMK hold		Swing	4.64	

=== 1967 ===
1967 Madras Legislative Assembly election: Omalur
Party	Candidate	Votes	%	±%
DMK	C. Palani	28,121	56.17	New
INC	C. Govindan	17,876	35.71	New
CPI	A. Rajagoopal	2,871	5.73	New
Independent	C. Nallappan	1,195	2.39	New
Margin of victory		10,245	20.46	
Turnout		50,063	62.43	
Registered electors		83,866		
DMK gain from Independent		Swing		

=== 1952 ===
1952 Madras Legislative Assembly election: Omalur
Party	Candidate	Votes	%	±%
Independent	P. Rathianaswami Pillai	24,781	52.07	New
INC	K. Najappa Chettiar	19,876	41.76	New
Independent	M. Venugopal	2,934	6.17	New
Margin of victory		4,905	10.31	
Turnout		47,591	70.57	
Registered electors		67,435		
Independent win (new seat)				
