= Peramachipalayam =

- Village
- Location in Tamil Nadu, India Peramachipalayam (India)
- Coordinates: 11°31′12″N 77°46′25″E
- Country: India
- State: Tamil Nadu
- District: Salem

Government
  - Type: Town Panchayat (Ward 1)

Languages
  - Official: Tamil
- Time zone: UTC+5:30 (IST)
- PIN: 637104
- Telephone code: 04283
- Vehicle registration: TN 52

Peramachipalayam is a village near Thevur panchayat town in Sankari taluk of Salem district in the Indian state of Tamil Nadu. Its pin code number is 637 104. The main occupation is agriculture here. In this village, Government school up to 5th grade is situated in front of mariamman temple.

== Caste factor ==
Gounder caste (BC) is the dominant caste in this village.
