= A. Tamizharasu =

Indian politician

Member of the Tamil Nadu Legislative Assembly
- In office 2006–2011
- Preceded by: S. Semmalai
- Succeeded by: C. Krishnan
- Constituency: Omalur constituency

A. Tamizharasu was elected to the Tamil Nadu Legislative Assembly from the Omalur constituency in the 2006 elections. He was a candidate of the Pattali Makkal Katchi (PMK) party.
