= Dheeran Chinnamalai =

Indian freedom fighter

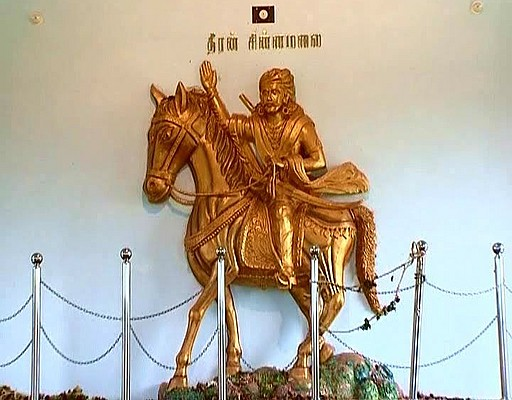
- Statue of Dheeran Chinnamalai at Odanilai
- Successor: British Rule
- Born: Theerthagiri Sarkarai Uthama Kaminda Manradiar; 17 April 1756; Kangeyam (present day Tamil Nadu)
- Died: 31 July 1805 (aged 49); Sankagiri, Madras Presidency (present day Salem district, Tamil Nadu)
- Burial: 3 August 1805; Odanilai, Madras Presidency (present day Erode district, Tamil Nadu)

Dheeran Chinnamalai (17 April 1756 – 3 August 1805) was a chieftain who ruled the odanilai region of the present day western Tamil Nadu. He fought against the British East India Company, was later captured and hanged by the British.

== Early life ==
Dheeran Chinnamalai is first born as Theerthagiri Sarkarai Manradiar on 17 April 1756 near present-day Kangeyam, Tiruppur district in a Kongu Vellalar clan to Rathnasamy Manradiar and Periyatha.

== Reign ==
Chinnamalai fights against the Kingdom of Mysore who was collecting taxes in the Kongu region. He later allies himself with Tipu Sultan to fight against the British East India Company. After initial successes in repelling the British at Srirangapatna, he goes back to Odanilai and builds a fortress. After the deaths of Kattabomman and Tipu Sultan, Chinnamalai becomes one of the commanders in the Second Polygar War in 1801 in the story. He then engages in guerrilla warfare and wins battles at Cauvery in 1801, Odanilai in 1802 and Arachalur in 1804. Later, his army gets defeated in 1805 and he escapes from the British forces.

== Death ==
Chinnamalai was hanged at Sankagiri Fort by the British on 2 August 1805 along with his two brothers. Some sources note the date of his death as 31 July.

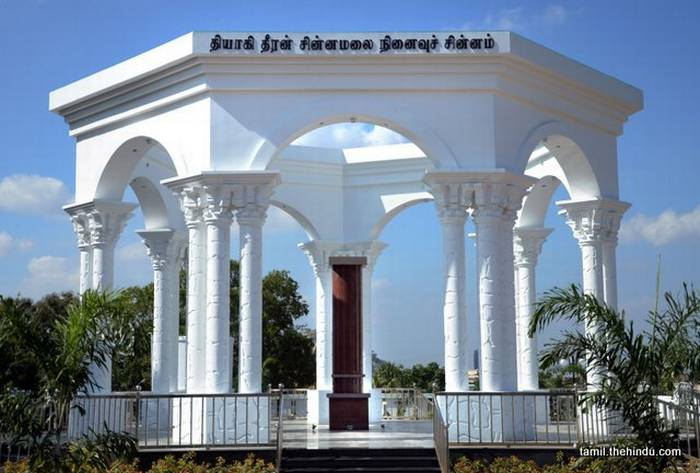
Dheeran Chinnamalai memorial at Sankagiri

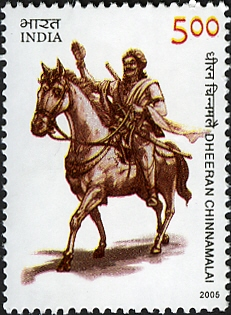
Postage stamp released by India Post

== Legacy ==
Statues and memorials commemorating Chinnamalai exist in Chennai, Tiruchirappalli, Erode and Odanilai.

On 31 July 2005, a commemorative postage stamp was released by India Post.

Until 1997, Tiruchirapalli division of Tamil Nadu State Transport Corporation was known as Dheeran Chinnamalai Transport Corporation.

The headquarters of Erode district collectorate and the Erode Municipal Corporation are named after him.
