= R. Mani =

Indian politician

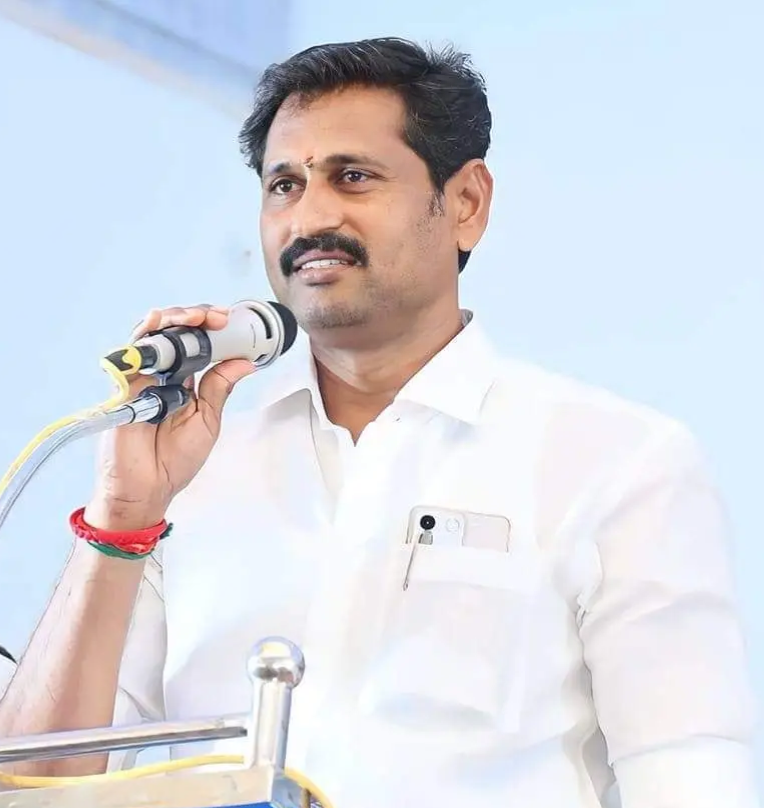

Member of the Tamil Nadu Legislative Assembly
- Incumbent
- Assumed office 12 May 2021
- Preceded by: S. Vetrivel
- Constituency: Omalur

Personal details
- Party: All India Anna Dravida Munnetra Kazhagam
- Parent: Rangasamy (father)
- Occupation: Politician

Rangasamy Mani is an Indian politician. He is a member of the All India Anna Dravida Munnetra Kazhagam party. He was elected as a member of Tamil Nadu Legislative Assembly from Omalur Constituency since May 2021.
