= Kiliyur Falls =

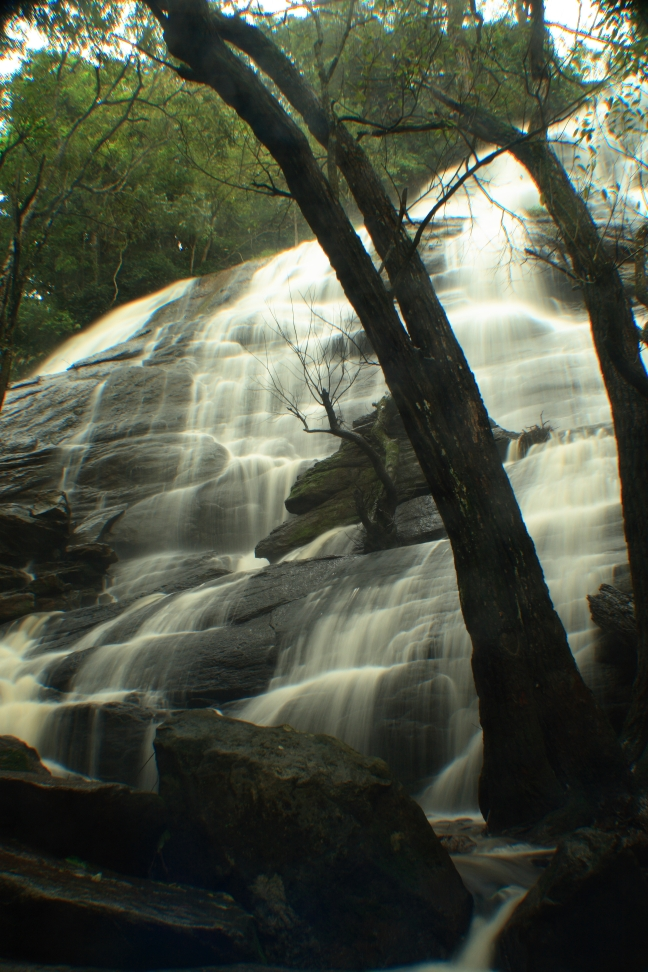
- Kiliyur Falls
- Interactive map of Kiliyur Falls
- Location: Yercaud
- Coordinates: 11°46′00″N 78°14′00″E
- Total height: 300 ft (91 m)

Kiliyur Falls is a waterfall on the Periyaaru river in the Servarayan hill range in the Eastern Ghats, Tamil Nadu, India. The waters overflowing the Yercaud Lake fall 91 m (300 ft) into the Kiliyur Valley. People need to walk down 200–250 steep steps from the nearest road to reach this waterfall.

== See also ==
- List of waterfalls
- List of waterfalls in India
- List of waterfalls in India by height
