= K. S. Subramania Gounder =

Indian politician

Member of the Madras State Assembly
- In office 1957 - 1962; 1962 - 1967
- Constituency: Sankari

Personal details
- Political party: Indian National Congress

K. S. Subramania Gounder was an Indian politician and former Member of the Legislative Assembly of Tamil Nadu. He was elected to the Tamil Nadu legislative assembly as an Indian National Congress candidate from Sankari constituency in 1957, and 1962 elections.
