= Thevur =

- Panchayat town
- Location in Tamil Nadu, India
- Coordinates: 11°31′12″N 77°46′25″E
- Country: India
- State: Tamil Nadu
- District: Salem

Area
  - Total: 7.25 km^{2} (2.80 sq mi)

Population (2011)
  - Total: 8,548
  - Density: 1,180/km^{2} (3,050/sq mi)

Languages
  - Official: Tamil
- Time zone: UTC+5:30 (IST)

Thevur is a panchayat town in Sankari taluk of Salem district in the Indian state of Tamil Nadu. It is one of the 31 panchayat towns in the district. Spread across an area of 7.25 km^{2} (2.80 sq mi), it had a population of 8,548 individuals as per the 2011 census.

== Geography and administration ==
Thevur is located in Sankari taluk of Salem district in the Indian state of Tamil Nadu. It is one of the 31 panchayat towns in the district. Spread across an area of 7.25 km^{2} (2.80 sq mi), it is located about 55 km (34 mi) from Salem and 27 km (17 mi) from Sankari.

The town panchayat is sub-divided into 15 wards. It is headed by a chairperson, who is elected by the members, who are chosen through direct elections. The town forms part of the Sankari Assembly constituency that elects its member to the Tamil Nadu legislative assembly and the Namakkal Lok Sabha constituency that elects its member to the Parliament of India.

== Demographics ==
As per the 2011 census, Thevur had a population of 8,548 individuals across 2,423 households. The population saw a marginal increase compared to the previous census in 2001 when 8,115 inhabitants were registered. The population consisted of 4,415 males and 4,133 females. About 727 individuals were below the age of six years. About 22.1% of the population belonged to scheduled castes. The entire population is classified as urban. The town has an average literacy rate of 65.8%.

About 58.1% of the eligible population were employed, of which majority were involved in agriculture and allied activities. Hinduism was the majority religion which was followed by 96.4% of the population, with Christianity (3.5%) and Islam (0.1%) being minor religions.
