= M. Sivaperumal =

Indian politician (born 1934)

M.Sivaperuman

MLA
- In office 1977–1980
- In office 1980–1984
- Constituency: Omalur

District Panchayat Chairman
- In office 2001–2006
- Constituency: Salem, Tamil Nadu

Personal details
- Born: 25 August 1934 Chinnanguppam, Hosur, Tamil Nadu, British India
- Spouse: S.Kuppammal
- Children: 2
- Occupation: Politics, Business

M. Sivaperuman (born 25 August 1934) is an Indian politician and former Member of the Legislative Assembly of Tamil Nadu. He was elected twice to the Tamil Nadu legislative assembly from Omalur constituency as an Anna Dravida Munnetra Kazhagam candidate in 1977, and 1980 elections. As a cadre of AIADMK party, he also served as a District Panchayat Chairman of Salem District from 2001 to 2006.
