= V. Muthu =

Indian politician

V. Muthu is an Indian politician and was a Member of the Legislative Assembly of Tamil Nadu. He was elected to the Tamil Nadu legislative assembly as a Dravida Munnetra Kazhagam candidate from Sankari constituency in the year (1996 Tamil Nadu state assembly election).
