= Sundararajan (politician) =

Indian politician

S. Sundararajan

Member of the Tamil Nadu Legislative Assembly
- In office 2 May 2021 – 4 May 2026
- Preceded by: S. Raja
- Succeeded by: S. Vetrivel
- Constituency: Sankari

Personal details
- Party: All India Anna Dravida Munnetra Kazhagam

Sundararajan is an Indian politician. He is a member of the All India Anna Dravida Munnetra Kazhagam party. He was elected as a member of Tamil Nadu Legislative Assembly from Sankari Constituency in May 2021.

S. Sundararajan is an Indian politician who is a Member of Legislative Assembly of Tamil Nadu. He was elected from Sankari as an All India Anna Dravida Munnetra Kazhagam candidate in 2021.

== Elections contested ==
Election	Constituency	Party	Result	Vote %	Runner-up	Runner-up Party	Runner-up vote %	Ref.
2021 Tamil Nadu Legislative Assembly election	Sankari	ADMK	Won	49.72%	K. M. Rajesh	DMK	41.09%	
