= R. R. Sekaran =

Indian politician

R. R. Sekaran was elected to the Tamil Nadu Legislative Assembly from the Omalur constituency in the 1996 elections. He won with 41523 votes. He was a candidate of the Tamil Maanila Congress (TMC) party.
