= Srikanth Sundararajan =

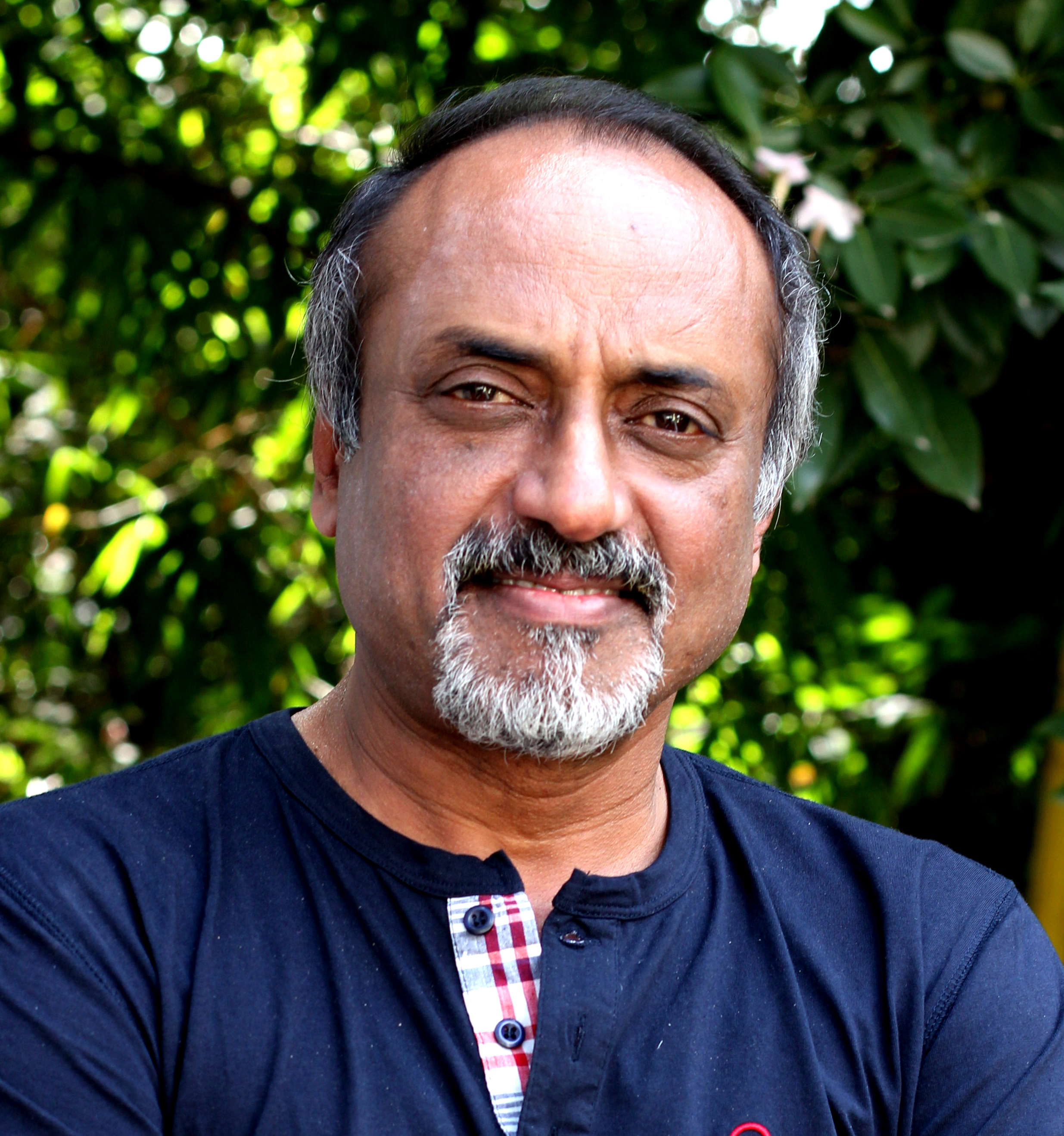
- Born: Srikanth Sundararajan; 15 November 1961 (age 63); Ranchi, India
- Occupation(s): Professor; Innovator; Technologist; Entrepreneur; Investor
- Years active: 1988–present
- Spouse: Usha Srikanth
- Children: 2

Srikanth Sundararajan is an Indian innovator, entrepreneur, professor, and investor. He has worked at Hewlett Packard, Informix, and his own startups Pretzel Logic Software, Inc. and International Decision Systems in the U.S. Sundararajan was part of the executive leadership team at HCL. He was CTO at Cognizant Technology Solutions, COO at Persistent Systems Ltd. In the early 1990s, he founded a start-up, Pretzel Logic Software Inc. which was acquired by BEA spinoff WebGain. He is a general partner with Ventureast and was previously a venture partner with Helion Advisors. He was an adjunct faculty of Computer Science at IIT Bhubaneswar and a visiting faculty at ISB (Indian School of Business).

== Personal life ==
Sundararajan lives in Hyderabad, India with his wife Usha, and two children.

== Education ==
- PhD in Computer & Information Sciences, University of Illinois, Urbana-Champaign 1988-89
- Master of Computer Science, University of Illinois, Urbana-Champaign
- Bachelor of Technology, Indian Institute of Technology, Madras 1984
- Adjunct Professor, CS, IIT Bhubaneswar

== Patents ==
- US Inventor number:5,412,758-for Flexible System for Knowledge Acquisition in Expert System Development

== Awards and recognition ==
- San Jose Business Journal Award for Top 100 Private Held Companies, 1995, 1996, 1997 for Pretzel Logic
- Inc 500 Listing for Pretzel Logic, 1996
- Cognizant “Technology Leadership Award for 2004: Outstanding Performance
