= International Decision Systems =

IDS
- Type: Private
- Industry: Computer software Information Technology
- Founded: 1974
- Headquarters: 220 South Sixth Street; Suite 700; Minneapolis, Minnesota, United States
- Area served: Worldwide
- Key people: David Hamilton (CEO) Katie Emmel (COO)
- Products: Rapport; InfoAnalysis; InfoLease
- Website: idsgrp.com

International Decision Systems (IDS), later rebranded as Solifi, is a software development company that creates software for financial institutions and equipment-leasing companies.

== History ==
IDS was founded in 1974 as Decision Systems. In 2000, the company changed its name to International Decision Systems when it went public in a merger with the British company CFS. Two years later in 2003, the company was bought back by the managers of IDS for $25 million. In 2008, IDS filed papers for an IPO hoping to raise $86 million. By 2026, IDS was renamed to Solifi.

== Company Overview ==
International Decision Systems, Inc. provides asset finance and portfolio management software for the asset financing industry. IDS headquarters is located in Minneapolis, Minnesota with additional offices in Sydney, Australia; London, United Kingdom; Singapore; and Bengaluru, India.

== Controversies ==
A lawsuit was filed against IDS in 2003, shortly after IDS managers bought back the company. Capital Stream Inc. filed a $20 million lawsuit alleging IDS executives used insider knowledge to buy the company.
