= Sangagiri =

Sangagiri Sankagiri, Sankari
- Town
- Sangagiri
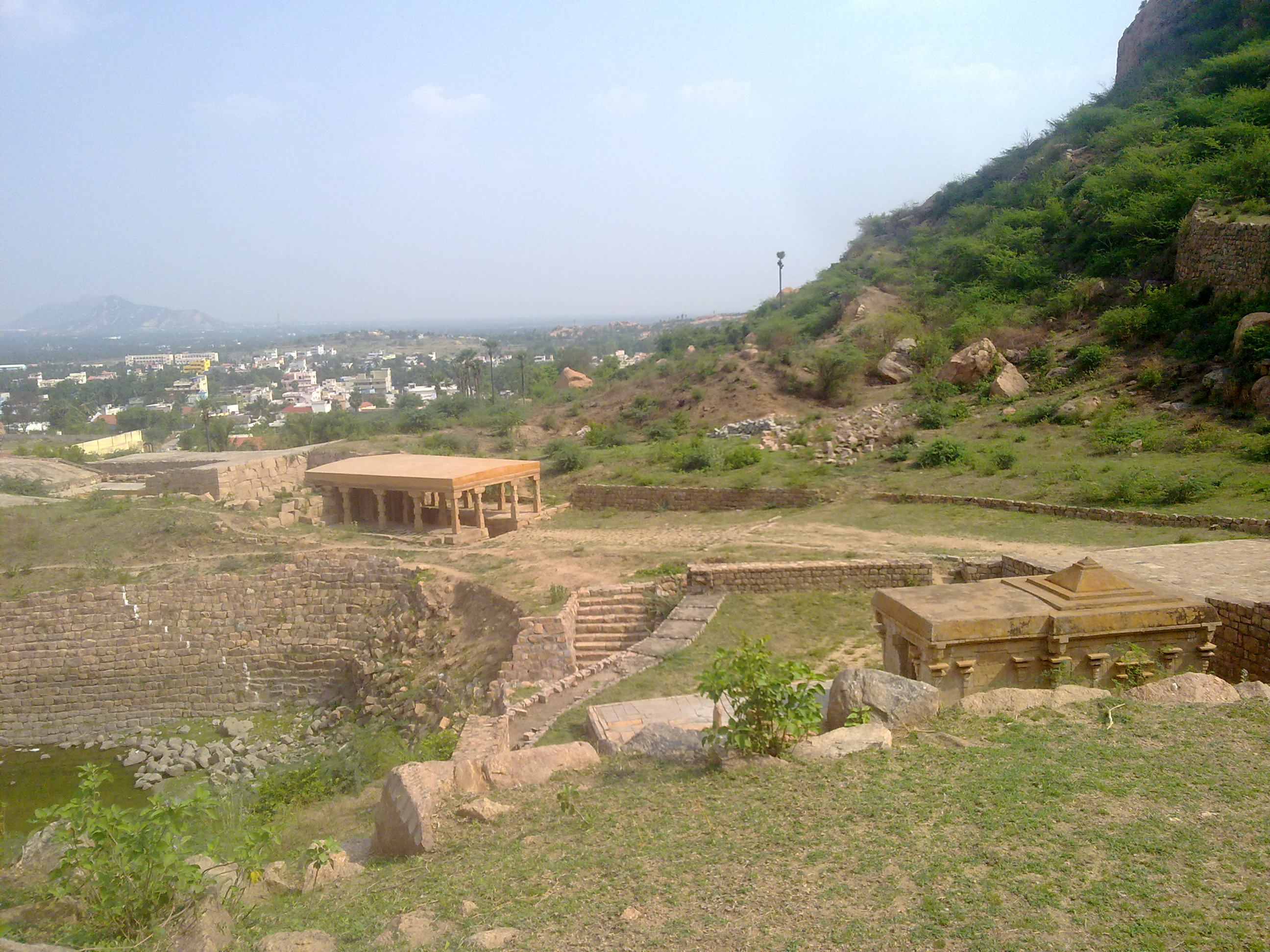
- View from Sangagiri Hill
- Nickname: Transport city
- Sangagiri, Tamil Nadu
- Coordinates: 11.474500°N 77.869100°E
- Country: India
- State: Tamil Nadu
- Region: Mazhanadu
- District: Salem
- Established: 20 March 1945

Government
  - Type: First grade municipality
- Elevation: 330 m (1,080 ft)

Population (2011)
  - Total: 29,467
  - Rank: 4
- Demonym: Sangagirian

Languages
  - Official: Tamil
- Time zone: UTC+5:30 (IST)
- PIN: 637301,637302,637303
- Telephone code: 91-04283
- Vehicle registration: TN 52
- Website: www.sankagiri.com

Sangagiri is a municipality in Salem district in the Indian state of Tamil Nadu. It is situated on the National Highway 544, on the Coimbatore - Salem section.

Sangagiri is known for Sangagiri fort, lorries and lorry building industries. It is the headquarters of Sangagiri revenue district comprising Edappadi. It is also the headquarters of Sangagiri educational district.

== Etymology ==
Sangagiri is pronounced as San-ga-giri in Tamil. Sangu means conch and Giri means hill.

== History ==
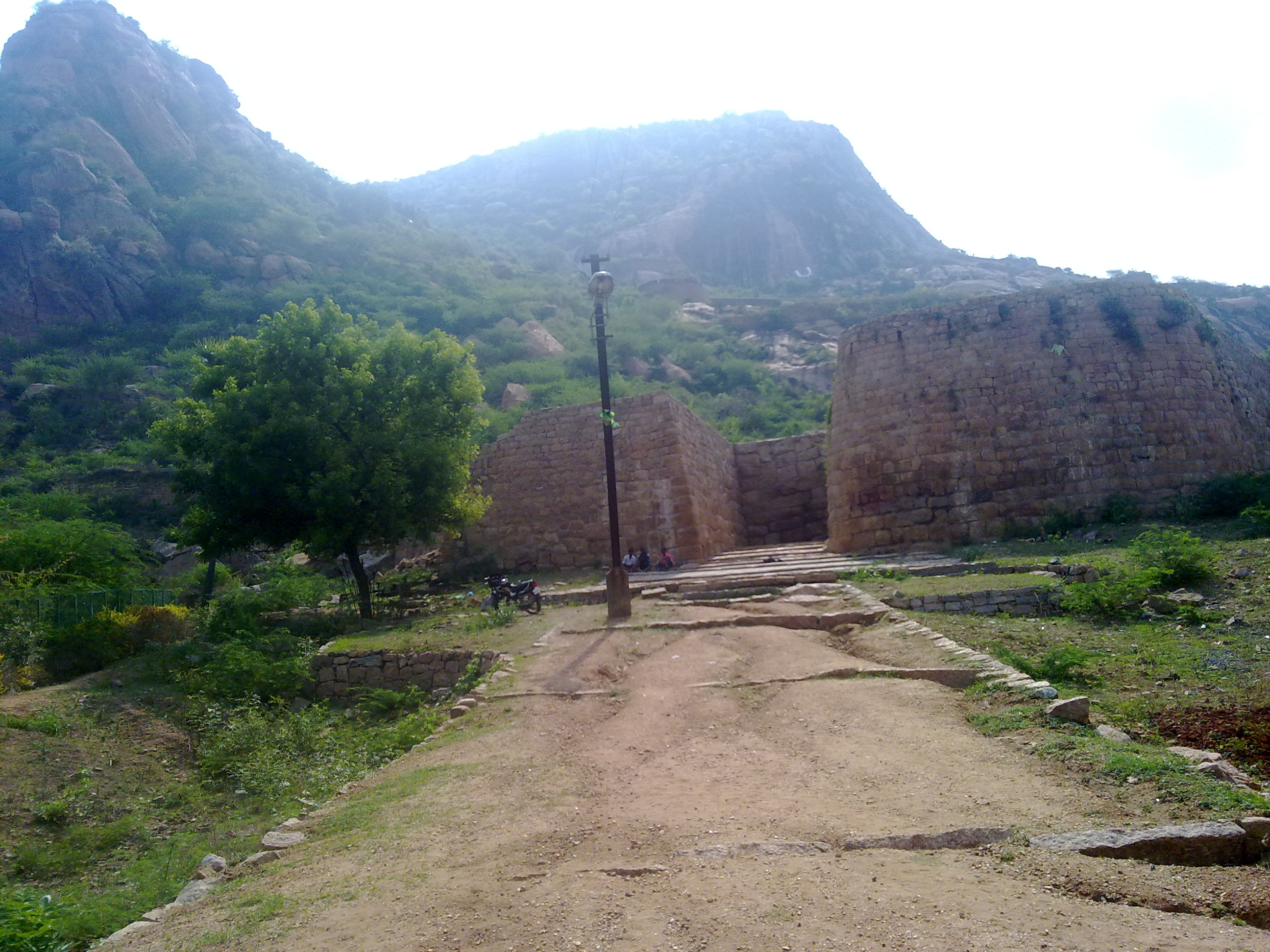
Entrance of Sangagiri Fort

In sangam age, Sangagiri came under Mazhanadu. It was also called Kundrathur. Sangagiri Fort was built in the 15th century by the Vijayanagar empire. It was later under the control of Dheeran Chinnamalai and Tippu Sultan before the British annexed it to their territory. Dheeran Chinnamalai was hanged by the British at Sangagiri Fort on 31 July 1805. The fort later served as a British tax storage facility for Kongu Nadu and the town developed around it.

== Demographics ==
=== Population ===
According to the 2011 census, Sangagiri had a population of 29,467. Male constitute 52% of the population and females 48%. Sangagiri has an average literacy rate of 68%, higher than the national average of 59.5%: Male literacy is 75%, and female literacy is 60%. In Sangagiri, 10% of the population is under 6 years of age. 40% of the percent are engaged in agriculture, and many of the rest are involved in the lorry transport industry.

=== Religion ===
Kongu Vellalar Gounder, Vanniar and Vettuva Gounder castes are the majority population in Sangagiri. The town also has a diverse religious population, including Hindus, Muslims, and Christians.

== Government and politics ==
Sangagiri Assembly constituency is the state assembly constituency in Salem district, Tamil Nadu, India. It comprises Sangagiri taluk and a portion of Omalur taluk. It is a part of the wider Namakkal constituency for national elections to the Parliament of India.

== Economy ==
The economy of the town was predominantly dependent on agriculture. Over the past decade, logistics and related services, cement, steel, spinning mills and body building industries have developed around the town contributing to the economy.

Sangagiri is well known for its truck logistics industry and SLOA (Sangagiri Lorry Owners Association), one of the biggest in India. Some long existent truck fleet operators from Sangagiri are SREE ROAD LINES (SRL), Sri Jayamurugan Transports, AST, SSPT, MM Roadways, KRN, Murugan, SPP, Triveni, SKP, SNR, Sankari Roadways, SPN, Simon, Sri Vari, AM TRANSPORT and MST. SLOA also runs the fuel station on Salem main road, Sangagiri. Many private bus companies like SPBT and Shanmugam bus service operate out of Sangagiri.

There is a cement plant of the India Cements Limited which has a production capacity of 2,000 tonnes/day and of late lorry industry in Sangagiri is fast picking up with Tiruchengode and Namakkal, places renowned for truck industry in the country. Industries in Sangagiri are dominated by Kongu Vellalar, Vanniar and Chettiar castes.

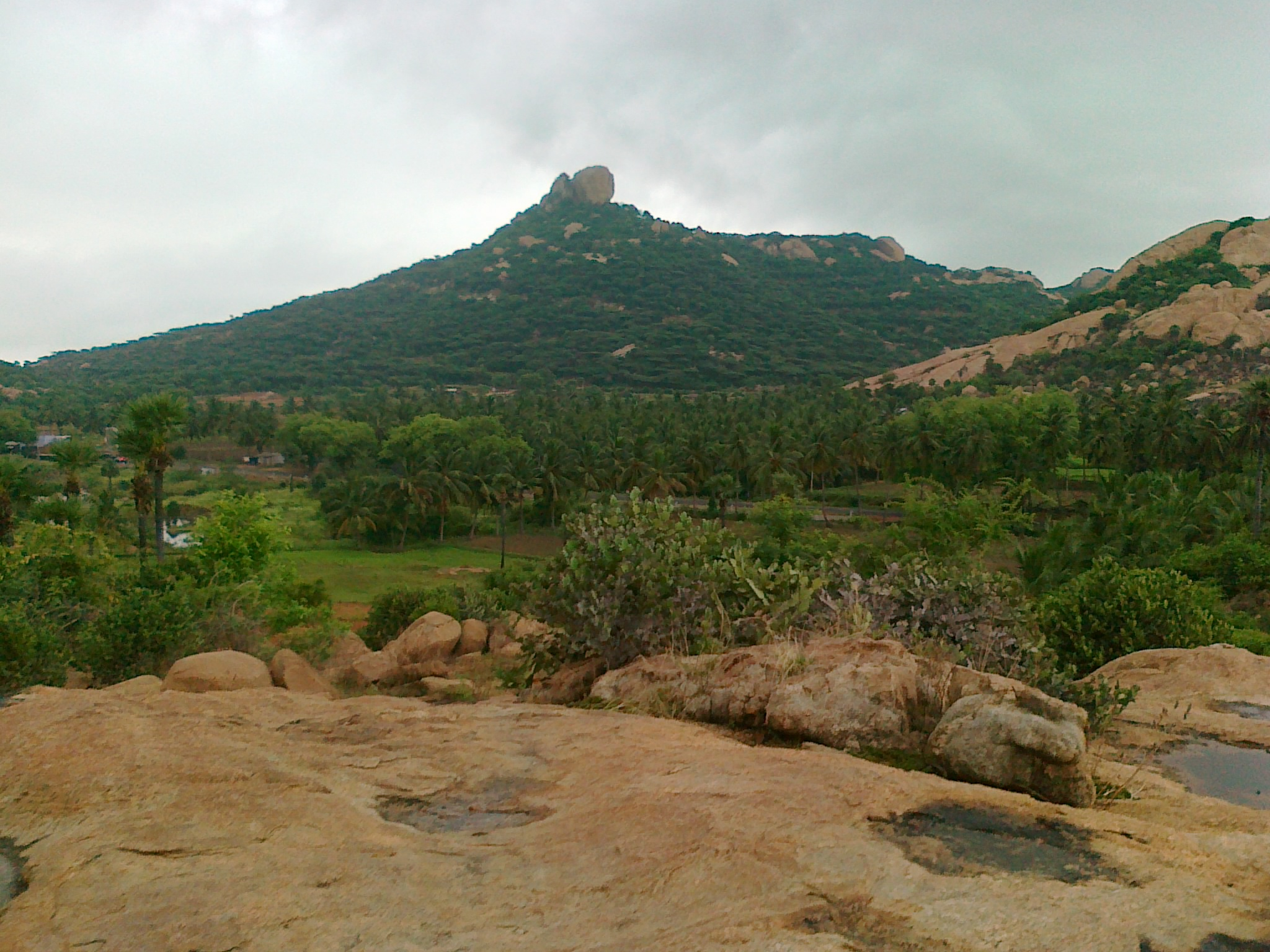
Orukkamalai Hill

== Culture ==
=== Tourist attractions ===
- Sangagiri Fort
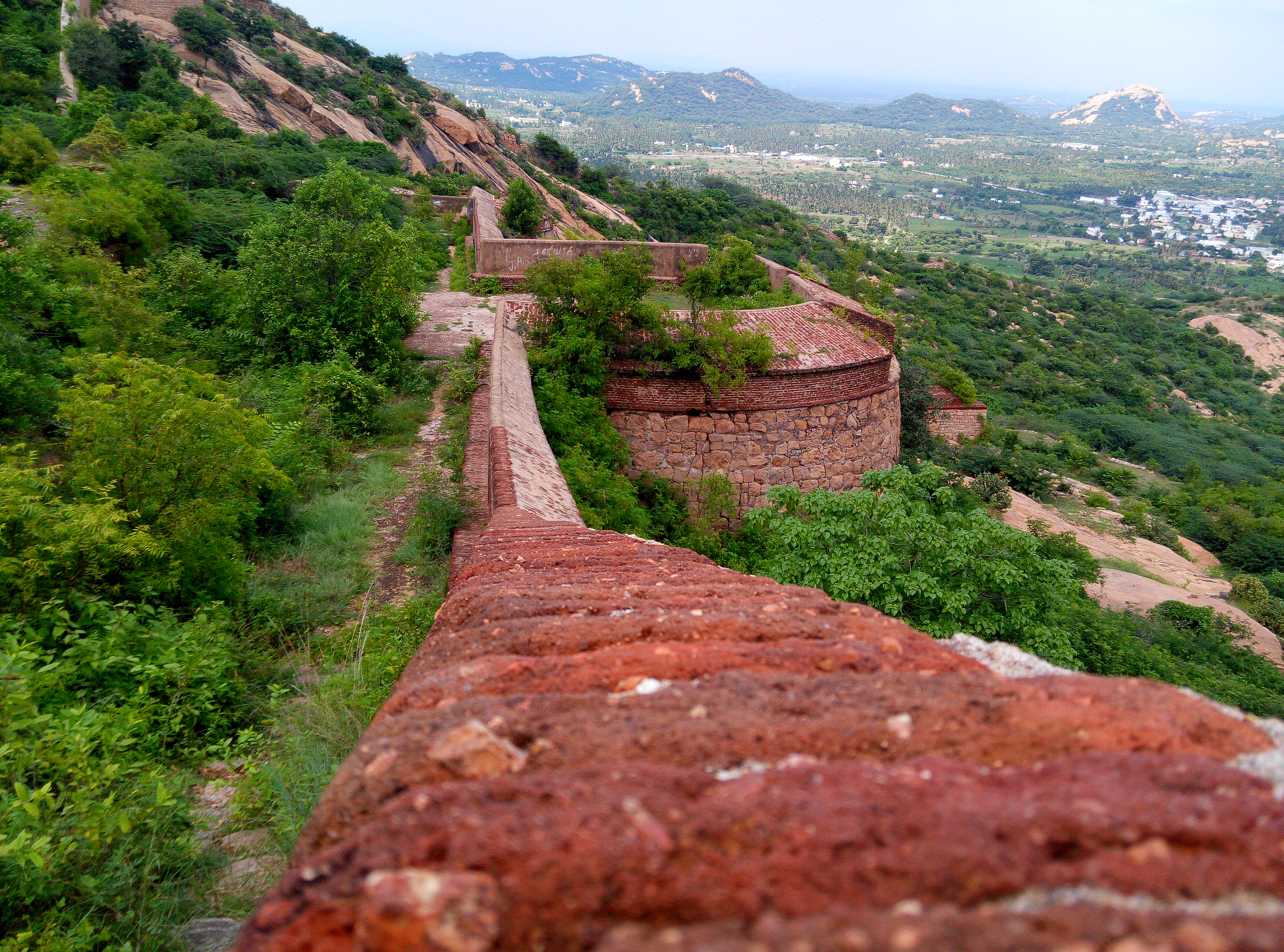
  Sangagiri Fort wall

== Transport ==
=== By road ===
Sangagiri is well connected by road, and regular bus facilities are available from Sangagiri to nearby towns and major cities in Tamil Nadu. Government and private buses operate frequent services to Erode, Salem, Bhavani, Coimbatore, the Nilgiris region, Tiruchengode, Namakkal, Karur, Tiruchirappalli, Edappadi, Mettur, Omalur, Kallakurichi, Villupuram, Chennai, and Madurai. In addition to long-distance routes, local town bus services connect surrounding areas, including routes such as S2 (Sangagiri–Bhavani) and S1 (Erode–Sangagiri), providing daily commuter connectivity.

=== By air ===
The nearest international airport to this town is Coimbatore International Airport, which is 117 km away. Alternately, one can reach through Tiruchirappalli International Airport, from a distance of 142 km. Another domestic airport available Salem Airport (India), which is 40 km.

=== By rail ===
Sangagiri railway station is also called as Sankari Durg railway station (SGE), which is a B grade station in Salem division. It has train services to/from major cities nearby.

The nearest railway junctions are Erode and Salem. It is not so crowded because it is located away from the town, meanwhile people around Sangagiri requested southern railways through Salem division for more trains to halt here. There are 14 trains halt here daily. Of these, six are express trains. They are:

- Erode - Chennai Yercaud Express
- Mangalore - Chennai West Coast Express
- Ernakulam - KSR Bengaluru Intercity Express
- Erode - Jolarpettai Express
- Coimbatore - Salem Memu Express
- Erode - Mettur Dam Express

== Notable people ==
- P. V. Nandhidhaa, Indian chess player, India's 17th Woman Grandmaster
- Edappadi K. Palaniswami, 7th chief minister of Tamil Nadu

== See also ==
- Vaikuntham
