= Anbalagan =

Anbalagan (Tamil: அன்பழகன்) is a Tamil patronymic surname and masculine given name. Notable people with the surname include:

- G. Anbalagan, Indian politician
- K. P. Anbalagan (born 1958), Indian politician
- S. Anbalagan, Indian politician
- V. Anbalagan, Indian politician
