= Palbakki C. Krishnan =

Indian politician

Palbakki C. Krishnan is an Indian politician and member of the Tamil Nadu Legislative Assembly who represented the Omalur constituency. He was a member of the Anna Dravida Munnetra Kazhagam party before being expelled.
