= Sangagiri Fort =

Historical fort in Salem District, India

Sankagiri Fort
- Part of Tamil Nadu
- Salem District, Tamil Nadu, India
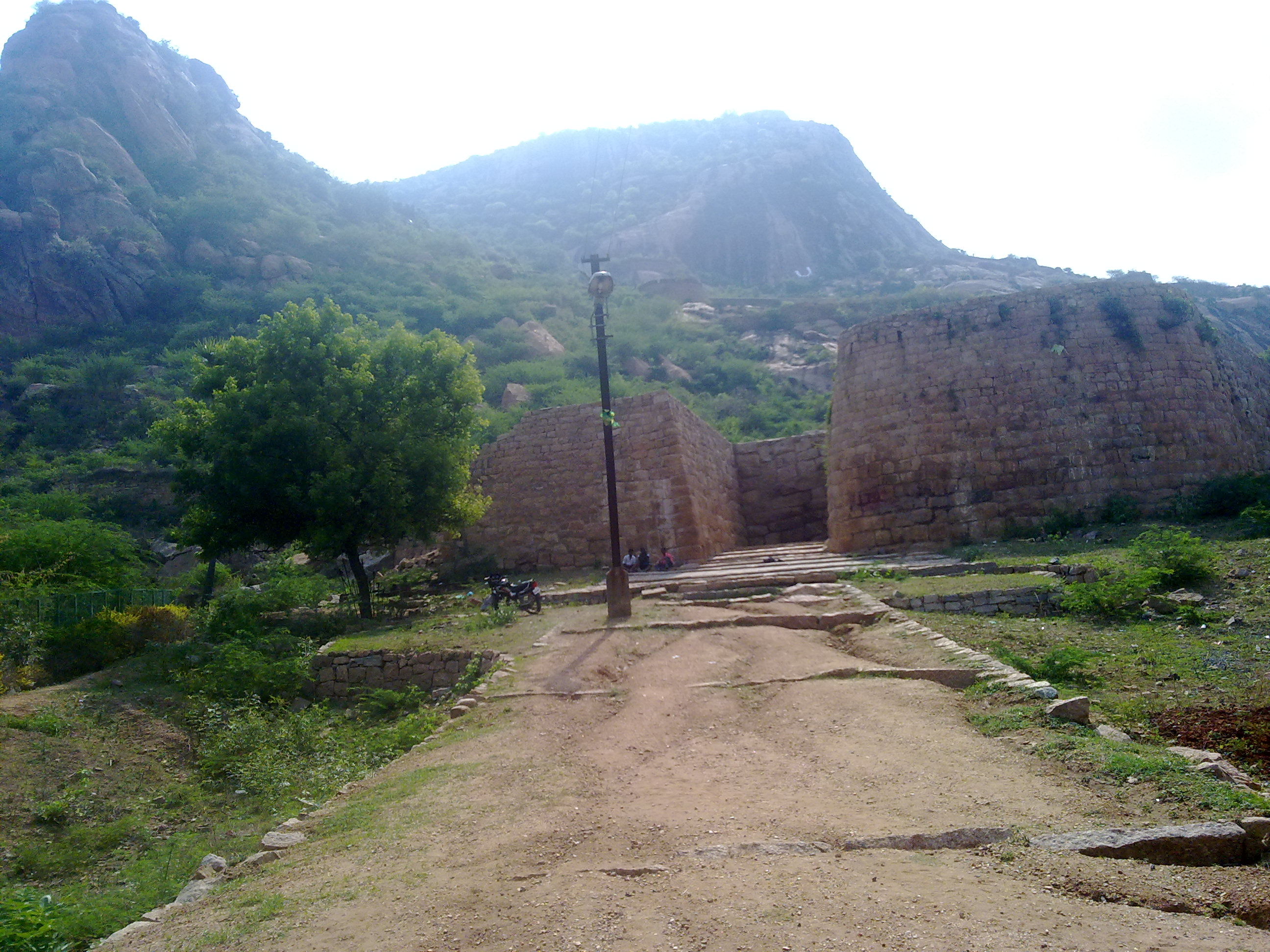
- Entrance

Site information
- Type: Forts
- Owner: Government of Tamil Nadu
- Controlled by: Vijayanagara Empire; Mysore; United Kingdom: East India Company (till 1857); India (1857-1947); India (1947-)
- Condition: Ruins

Location
- Location within Tamil Nadu
- Coordinates: 11.77°N 78.203°E

Sankagiri Fort is a historical fort maintained by the Archaeological Survey of India. It is located 22 km from the city of Erode and 38 km from Salem. Sankari or Sankagiri is the town located around this place. The fort is 707 meters (2319.6 feet) high and covers an area of 558.58 acres.

== Sankagiri fort ==
Sangagiri Fort was built in 15th century Vijayanagar empire. It has 14 fort walls built on and around a hill and the last phase these walls were built by the British. The fort served as a British tax storage facility for Kongu Nadu, a region comprising the districts of Salem, Erode, Coimbatore, Tiruppur, Namakkal, Karur and Dindukal. It is also known as Guptha Giri.

It was an important military base for Tipu Sultan and later for the British East India Company. This is because only one side of the hill is climbable, as all the others are too steep to climb. This has a death well, granary, two oil godowns, one explosives godown, two masjiths, 2 Varadharaja Perumal temples, former British administrative buildings, and cemeteries formerly used by armies that were stationed at the fort.

Following the demise of Chola rule in the 13th century, the Thanjavur country came under the rule of the Pandyas who ruled for about a century. Following the invasion of Malik Kafur, the Tanjore country fell into disorder. The rule of the Delhi Sultanate lasted for half a century before Pandya chieftains reasserted their independence. Soon afterwards, however, they were conquered by the Vijayanagar Empire. The supremacy of Vijayanagar was challenged by the Nayaks of Madurai who eventually conquered Thanjavur in 1646. The rule of the Thanjavur Nayaks lasted until 1673 when Chokkanatha Nayak the ruler of Madurai invaded Thanjavur and killed the ruler Vijayaraghava.

Chokkanatha placed his brother Alagiri on the throne of Thanjavur, but within a year the latter threw off his allegiance, and Chokkanatha was forced to recognise the independence of Thanjavur. A son of Vijaya Raghava induced the Bijapur Sultan to help him get back the Thanjavur throne. In 1675, the Sultan of Bijapur sent a force commanded by the Maratha general Venkoji (alias Ekoji) to recapture the kingdom from the new invader. Venkoji defeated Alagiri with ease, and occupied Thanjavur. He did not, however, place his protégée on the throne as instructed by the Bijapur Sultan, but seized the kingdom and made himself king. Thus began the rule of the Marathas over Thanjavur.

During this period Chettiar community helped the Thanjavur kingdom to mobilise money to fight against invaders. Hence Marathas ordered to convict all the Chettiar men. To avoid losing succession in the community, elderly wisemen arranged to gather 500 children of Chettiar community and confidentially moved them to Sangagiri region. These people were called Five hundred Kongu chettiars. Chettiars being devotees of Lord Shiva, built their Shiva temple near Sangagiri in a place called Sunnambu Kuttai (Limestone Pond). The temple lord Shiva was named Kopineshwar, with Angayarkanni (Lord Meenakshi of Madurai).

To minimise the anger of Maratha king, (if at all king finds that Chettiar community is survived), these 500 people must be pardoned. Chettiars also named the deity after the Maratha lord Kopineshwar located at Thane. The temple at Thane was originally built when Silharas ruled thane from 810 to 1260. This temple at Thane was renovated during 1760, by Maratha king Maratha general Chimaji Appa.

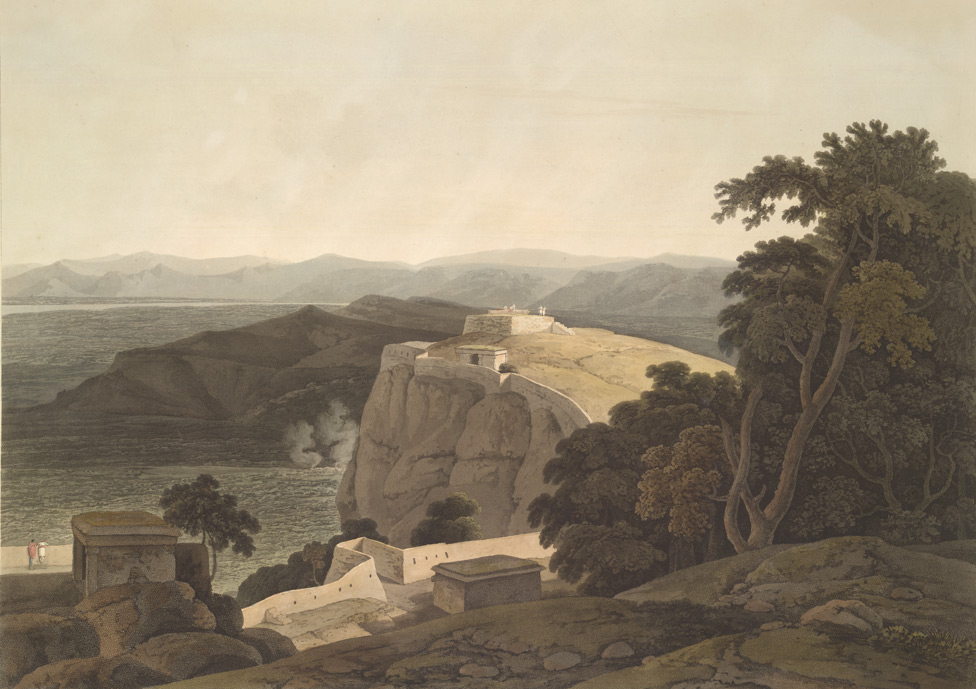
Sankry Droog, in the 1790s, by Thomas Daniell

The remains of dilapidated temple Kopineshwar-Angayarkanni temple is still found on the way to Idapadi. This dilapidated temple was identified in 1982 by Viswanathan Chettiar of Coimbatore. He has identified the boundary of the temple, sanctum sanctorum of the temple and few broken granite idols. The adjacent land was cultivated, but this temple land was isolated and nobody wants to misuse this land due to its mystical power. Based on this fact, Viswanathan Chettiar initiated to build the temple in the location.

The author learns that Viswanathan Chettiar of Coimbatore has built the sanctum sanctorum and died.

== See also ==
- Erode Fort
- Tanjore Fort
