= Sangagiri Assembly constituency =

State Legislative Assembly Constituency in Tamil Nadu

Coordinates: 11.47°N 77.87°E

Sangagiri
- Constituency No. 87 for the Tamil Nadu Legislative Assembly

Constituency details
- Country: India
- Region: South India
- State: Tamil Nadu
- District: Salem
- Lok Sabha constituency: Namakkal
- Established: 1957
- Total electors: 2,60,590

Member of Legislative Assembly
- 17th Tamil Nadu Legislative Assembly
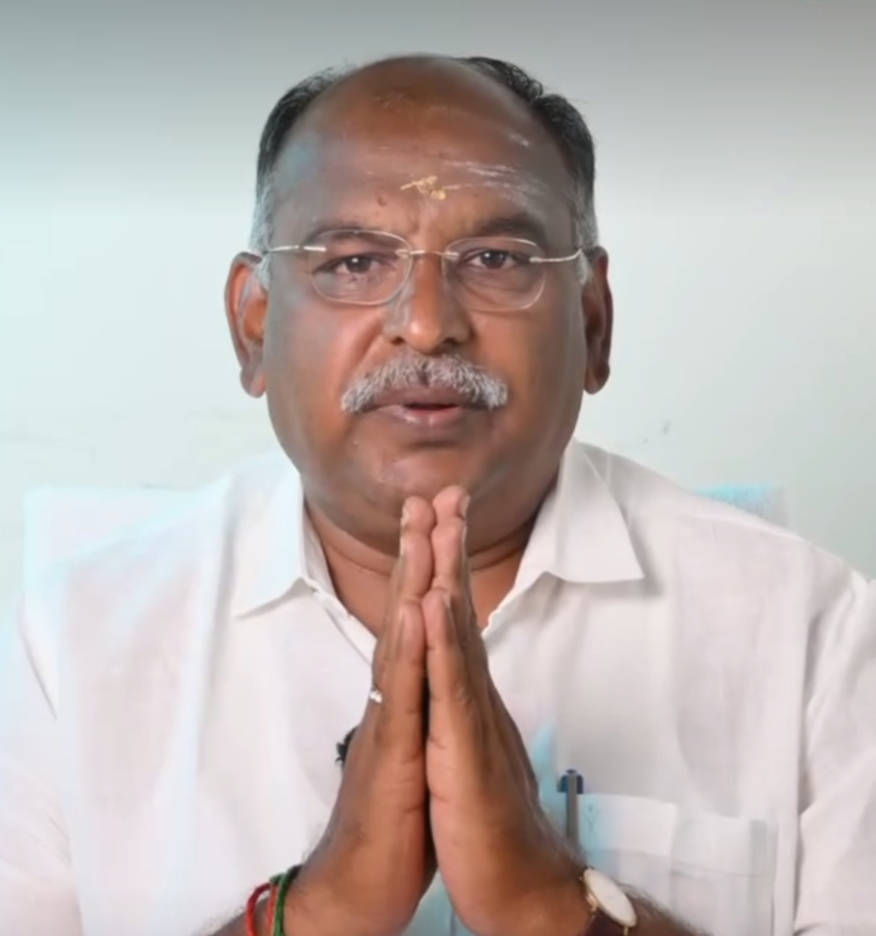
- Incumbent S. Vetrivel
- Party: AIADMK
- Alliance: NDA
- Elected year: 2026

Sangakiri is a state assembly constituency in Salem district, Tamil Nadu, India. Its State Assembly Constituency number is 87. It comprises Sangagiri taluk and a portion of Omalur taluk. It is a part of the wider Namakkal Lok Sabha constituency for national elections to the Parliament of India. Elections and winners in the constituency are listed below. The constituency has been in existence since the 1957 election. It is one of the 234 State Legislative Assembly Constituencies in Tamil Nadu, in India.

== Demographics ==
The Kongu Vellalar community has a large number of people in this constituency, followed by the Kongu Vettuva gounder, Vanniyar, Senguntha Mudaliar, Sozhiya Vellalar, Muslim, and Adi Dravida communities.

== Members of Legislative Assembly ==
Year	Member	Political party
Madras State
1957	K. S. Subramania Gounder	Indian National Congress
1962	K. S. Subramania Gounder	Indian National Congress
1967	R. Nallamuthu	Dravida Munnetra Kazhagam
Tamil Nadu
1971	V. Muthu	Dravida Munnetra Kazhagam
1977	P. Dhanapal	All India Anna Dravida Munnetra Kazhagam
1980	P. Dhanapal	All India Anna Dravida Munnetra Kazhagam
1984	P. Dhanapal	All India Anna Dravida Munnetra Kazhagam
1989	R. Varadarajan	Dravida Munnetra Kazhagam
1991	V. Saroja	All India Anna Dravida Munnetra Kazhagam
1996	V. Muthu	Dravida Munnetra Kazhagam
2001	P. Dhanapal	All India Anna Dravida Munnetra Kazhagam
2006	V. P. Duraisamy	Dravida Munnetra Kazhagam
2011	P. Vijayalakshmi	All India Anna Dravida Munnetra Kazhagam
2016	S. Raja	All India Anna Dravida Munnetra Kazhagam
2021	S. Sundararajan	All India Anna Dravida Munnetra Kazhagam
2026	S. Vetrivel	All India Anna Dravida Munnetra Kazhagam

== Election results ==
Vote share of winning candidates
2026	35.83%
2021	49.72%
2016	44.57%
2011	57.07%
2006	46.85%
2001	56.41%
1996	54.43%
1991	70.01%
1989	41.72%
1984	56.99%
1980	56.61%
1977	53.27%
1971	60.73%
1967	61.70%
1962	48.38%
1957	60.09%

=== 2026 ===
2026 Tamil Nadu Legislative Assembly election: Sankari
Party	Candidate	Votes	%	±%
AIADMK	Vetrivel. S	87,342	35.83	▼13.89
TVK	Senthilkumar. K	77,825	31.92	New
DMK	Manikandan. M	65,716	26.96	▼14.13
NTK	Nithya. A	7,534	3.09	▼1.59
NOTA	NOTA	711	0.29	▼0.34
Margin of victory		9,517	3.91	▼4.72
Turnout		2,43,779	93.55	▲8.86
Registered electors		2,60,590		▼13,644
AIADMK hold		Swing	▼13.89	

=== 2021 ===
2021 Tamil Nadu Legislative Assembly election: Sangagiri
Party	Candidate	Votes	%	±%
AIADMK	S. Sundararajan	115,472	49.72%	+5.15
DMK	K. M. Rajesh	95,427	41.09%	New
NTK	S. Shobana	10,862	4.68%	+3.97
MNM	K. Sengodan	3,175	1.37%	New
AMMK	A. Chellamuthu	1,471	0.63%	New
NOTA	NOTA	1,469	0.63%	−0.73
Margin of victory		20,045	8.63%	−8.68%
Turnout		232,247	84.69%	0.65%
Rejected ballots		53	0.02%	
Registered electors		274,234		
AIADMK hold		Swing	5.15%	

=== 2016 ===
2016 Tamil Nadu Legislative Assembly election: Sangagiri
Party	Candidate	Votes	%	±%
AIADMK	S. Raja	96,202	44.57%	−12.51
INC	T. K. Rajeswaran	58,828	27.25%	New
PMK	P. Kannan	37,927	17.57%	New
TMC(M)	K. Selvakumar	5,633	2.61%	New
KMDK	K. Saravanan	5,091	2.36%	New
BJP	A. C. Murugesan	3,184	1.48%	+0.87
NOTA	NOTA	2,934	1.36%	New
NTK	V. Janaki	1,521	0.70%	New
Independent	A. Muthusamy	1,110	0.51%	New
Margin of victory		37,374	17.31%	−1.66%
Turnout		215,863	84.04%	−2.08%
Registered electors		256,847		
AIADMK hold		Swing	-12.51%	

=== 2011 ===
2011 Tamil Nadu Legislative Assembly election: Sangagiri
Party	Candidate	Votes	%	±%
AIADMK	P. Vijayalakshmi Palanisamy	105,502	57.07%	+21.57
DMK	Veerapandy S. Arumugam	70,423	38.10%	−8.76
Independent	M. Boopathy	1,194	0.65%	New
BJP	P. Natarajan	1,127	0.61%	New
Independent	S. K. Venkadachalam	1,103	0.60%	New
IJK	M. Mohankumar	1,095	0.59%	New
Margin of victory		35,079	18.98%	7.63%
Turnout		184,859	86.13%	17.46%
Registered electors		214,637		
AIADMK gain from DMK		Swing	10.22%	

=== 2006 ===
2006 Tamil Nadu Legislative Assembly election: Sangagiri
Party	Candidate	Votes	%	±%
DMK	V. P. Duraisamy	67,792	46.85%	+8.86
AIADMK	S. Shanthamani	51,372	35.50%	−20.91
DMDK	R. Easwaran	19,109	13.21%	New
Independent	P. Sakthivel	1,918	1.33%	New
BSP	P. Ponnusami	1,267	0.88%	New
Independent	P. Kandhasamy	930	0.64%	New
Margin of victory		16,420	11.35%	−7.07%
Turnout		144,691	68.66%	9.07%
Registered electors		210,731		
DMK gain from AIADMK		Swing	-9.56%	

=== 2001 ===
2001 Tamil Nadu Legislative Assembly election: Sangagiri
Party	Candidate	Votes	%	±%
AIADMK	P. Dhanapal	70,312	56.41%	+20.07
DMK	T. R. Saravanan	47,360	38.00%	−16.43
MDMK	S. Murugesan	4,704	3.77%	New
Independent	R. Ranganathan	2,263	1.82%	New
Margin of victory		22,952	18.41%	0.33%
Turnout		124,639	59.59%	−3.04%
Registered electors		209,155		
AIADMK gain from DMK		Swing	1.98%	

=== 1996 ===
1996 Tamil Nadu Legislative Assembly election: Sangagiri
Party	Candidate	Votes	%	±%
DMK	V. Muthu	64,216	54.43%	+30.45
AIADMK	K. K. Ramasamy	42,880	36.35%	−33.66
CPI(M)	C. Duraisamy	4,662	3.95%	New
Independent	M. R. Balakrishnan	1,465	1.24%	New
BJP	P. Palani	993	0.84%	New
Independent	C. Kuppan	678	0.57%	New
Margin of victory		21,336	18.09%	−27.94%
Turnout		117,976	62.64%	1.54%
Registered electors		196,150		
DMK gain from AIADMK		Swing	-15.58%	

=== 1991 ===
1991 Tamil Nadu Legislative Assembly election: Sangagiri
Party	Candidate	Votes	%	±%
AIADMK	V. Saroja	79,039	70.01%	+35.86
DMK	R. Varadarajan	27,080	23.99%	−17.73
PMK	V. Ramn	5,902	5.23%	New
Margin of victory		51,959	46.02%	38.45%
Turnout		112,901	61.10%	0.03%
Registered electors		189,946		
AIADMK gain from DMK		Swing	28.29%	

=== 1989 ===
1989 Tamil Nadu Legislative Assembly election: Sangagiri
Party	Candidate	Votes	%	±%
DMK	R. Varadarajan	43,365	41.72%	+0.73
AIADMK	R. Dhanapal	35,496	34.15%	−22.84
INC	M. Kolandairaj	12,431	11.96%	New
AIADMK	V. Ambedhkhar	8,625	8.30%	−48.69
Independent	M. Mani	1,947	1.87%	New
Independent	M. Palaniappan	702	0.68%	New
INC(J)	K. M. Srivnivasn	546	0.53%	New
Margin of victory		7,869	7.57%	−8.44%
Turnout		103,953	61.07%	−7.79%
Registered electors		174,383		
DMK gain from AIADMK		Swing	-15.27%	

=== 1984 ===
1984 Tamil Nadu Legislative Assembly election: Sangagiri
Party	Candidate	Votes	%	±%
AIADMK	P. Dhanapal	58,276	56.99%	+0.38
DMK	S. Murugesan	41,906	40.98%	−0.06
Independent	P. Mani	1,501	1.47%	New
Independent	N. Lakshmi	573	0.56%	New
Margin of victory		16,370	16.01%	0.44%
Turnout		102,256	68.86%	13.40%
Registered electors		155,258		
AIADMK hold		Swing	0.38%	

=== 1980 ===
1980 Tamil Nadu Legislative Assembly election: Sangagiri
Party	Candidate	Votes	%	±%
AIADMK	P. Dhanapal	45,664	56.61%	+3.33
DMK	R. Varadarajan	33,109	41.04%	+21.95
JP	R. Kandasamy	1,329	1.65%	New
Independent	T. K. Manickam	564	0.70%	New
Margin of victory		12,555	15.56%	−18.61%
Turnout		80,666	55.45%	11.57%
Registered electors		148,309		
AIADMK hold		Swing	3.33%	

=== 1977 ===
1977 Tamil Nadu Legislative Assembly election: Sangagiari
Party	Candidate	Votes	%	±%
AIADMK	P. Dhanapal	32,780	53.27%	New
DMK	M. Paramanandam	11,751	19.10%	−41.63
JP	P. Muthuswamy	9,131	14.84%	New
INC	M. Velraj	5,125	8.33%	−29.81
Independent	K. Palanisamy	1,224	1.99%	New
Independent	T. K. Manickam	1,161	1.89%	New
Independent	P. Muthusamy	358	0.58%	New
Margin of victory		21,029	34.18%	11.59%
Turnout		61,530	43.88%	−5.25%
Registered electors		142,856		
AIADMK gain from DMK		Swing	-7.46%	

=== 1971 ===
1971 Tamil Nadu Legislative Assembly election: Sangagiri
Party	Candidate	Votes	%	±%
DMK	V. Muthur	27,741	60.73%	−0.97
INC	P. T. Seerangan	17,422	38.14%	+2.95
Independent	S. Palaniappan	514	1.13%	New
Margin of victory		10,319	22.59%	−3.92%
Turnout		45,677	49.13%	−4.01%
Registered electors		99,756		
DMK hold		Swing	-0.97%	

=== 1967 ===
1967 Madras Legislative Assembly election: Sangagiri
Party	Candidate	Votes	%	±%
DMK	R. Nallamuthu	30,112	61.70%	+29.63
INC	A. Rajendran	17,174	35.19%	−13.19
Independent	K. Kandasamy	765	1.57%	New
ABJS	P. Raju	753	1.54%	New
Margin of victory		12,938	26.51%	10.20%
Turnout		48,804	53.14%	−13.03%
Registered electors		94,558		
DMK gain from INC		Swing	13.32%	

=== 1962 ===
1962 Madras Legislative Assembly election: Sangagiri
Party	Candidate	Votes	%	±%
INC	K. S. Subramania Gounder	26,531	48.38%	−11.72
DMK	B. Pandarinathan	17,587	32.07%	New
SWA	M. S. Krishnan	10,123	18.46%	New
Independent	Paruvaraji	601	1.10%	New
Margin of victory		8,944	16.31%	−18.34%
Turnout		54,842	66.17%	25.00%
Registered electors		86,673		
INC hold		Swing	-11.72%	

=== 1957 ===
1957 Madras Legislative Assembly election: Sangagiri
Party	Candidate	Votes	%	±%
INC	K. S. Subramania Gounder	21,408	60.09%	New
Independent	R. Thandavan	9,064	25.44%	New
CPI	T. S. Arthanari	3,974	11.16%	New
Independent	Narayanasami	1,178	3.31%	New
Margin of victory		12,344	34.65%	
Turnout		35,624	41.17%	
Registered electors		86,522		
INC win (new seat)				
