= Sangagiri taluk =

Coordinates: 11.48°N 77.87°E

Sangagiri taluk is a taluk of Salem district of the Indian state of Tamil Nadu. The headquarters of the taluk is the town of Sangagiri. Sangagiri Fort is one of the tourist spots of this taluk

== Demographics ==
According to the 2011 census, the taluk of Sangagiri had a population of 242,671 with 125,818 males and 116,853 females. There were 929 women for every 1000 men. The taluk had a literacy rate of 62.49. Child population in the age group below 6 was 10,862 Males and 9,433 Females.

== Transportation ==
The nearest railway station is Sangagiri Railway station (Sankari Durg, SGE), which is about 3 km from the center of Sangagiri town and Salem (SXV) airport is the nearest airport.
