= 2011 Tamil Nadu Legislative Assembly election =

Indian election

- 13 April 2011

All 234 seats in the Legislature of Tamil Nadu 118 seats needed for a majority
- Opinion polls
- Turnout: 78.01% (▲7.19%)
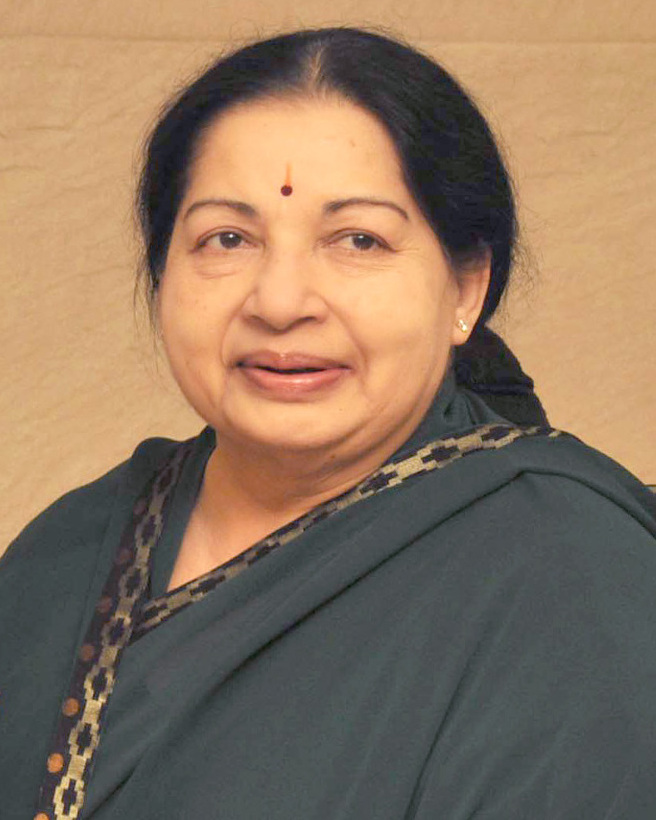

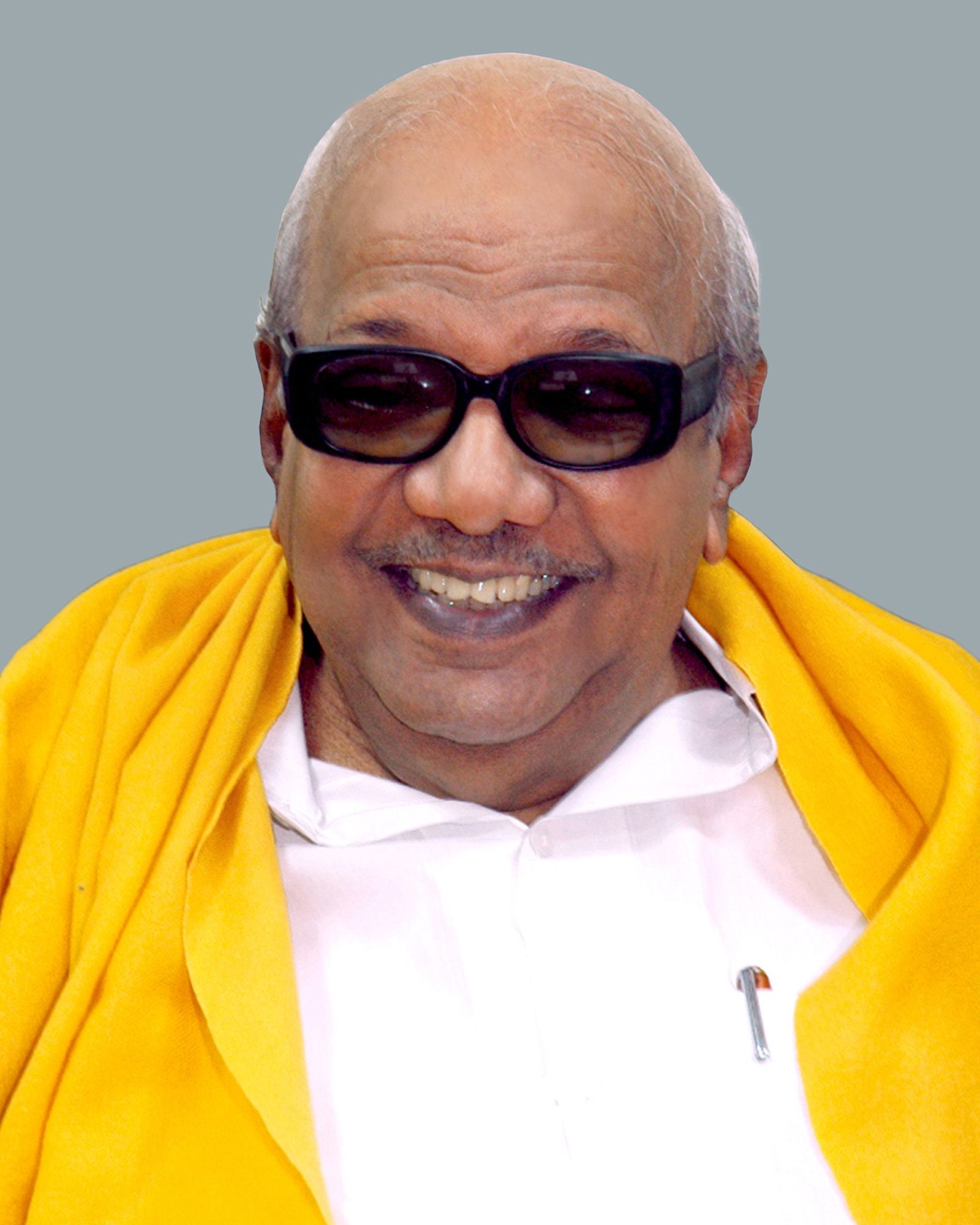
	First party	Second party
Leader	J. Jayalalithaa	M. Karunanidhi
Party	AIADMK	DMK
Alliance	AIADMK+	DPA
Leader since	1989	1969
Leader's seat	Srirangam	Thiruvarur
Last election	61	96
Seats won	150	23
Seat change	▲89	▼73
Popular vote	14,150,289	8,249,991
Percentage	38.4%	22.4%
Swing	▲5.4 pp	▼4.1 pp
Alliance seats	203	31
Alliance seat change	▲125 (Note: Includes Independent MLA T. Ramachandran who joined Communist Party of India earlier)	▼119
Alliance popular vote	19,085,762	14,530,215
Alliance percentage	51.9%	39.5%

Chief Minister before election
M. Karunanidhi
DMK
Elected Chief Minister
J. Jayalalithaa
AIADMK

The Fourteenth Legislative Assembly Election was held on 13 April 2011 to elect members from 234 constituencies in the Indian state of Tamil Nadu. Results were released on 13 May 2011. Two major parties Dravida Munnetra Kazhagam (DMK) and All India Anna Dravida Munnetra Kazhagam (AIADMK) faced the election as coalitions of multiple political parties: DMK front consisted of 8 parties and the AIADMK of 11 parties. Vijayakanth's Desiya Murpokku Dravida Kazhagam (DMDK), which had contested the previous elections independently, allied with the AIADMK coalition. Marumalarchi Dravida Munnetra Kazhagam boycotted the election following a disagreement with Jayalalithaa over seat-sharing. The outgoing Karunanidhi government was noted for the construction of new assembly building in Chennai, and issuance of a range of freebies such as color television to all. However, these were heavily overshadowed by other major issues such as incessant power cuts in households and industries, excessive sand mining, increasing prices of essential items, 2G spectrum case and undue influence of Karunanidhi's extended family in various aspects of Tamil politics and business and even media.

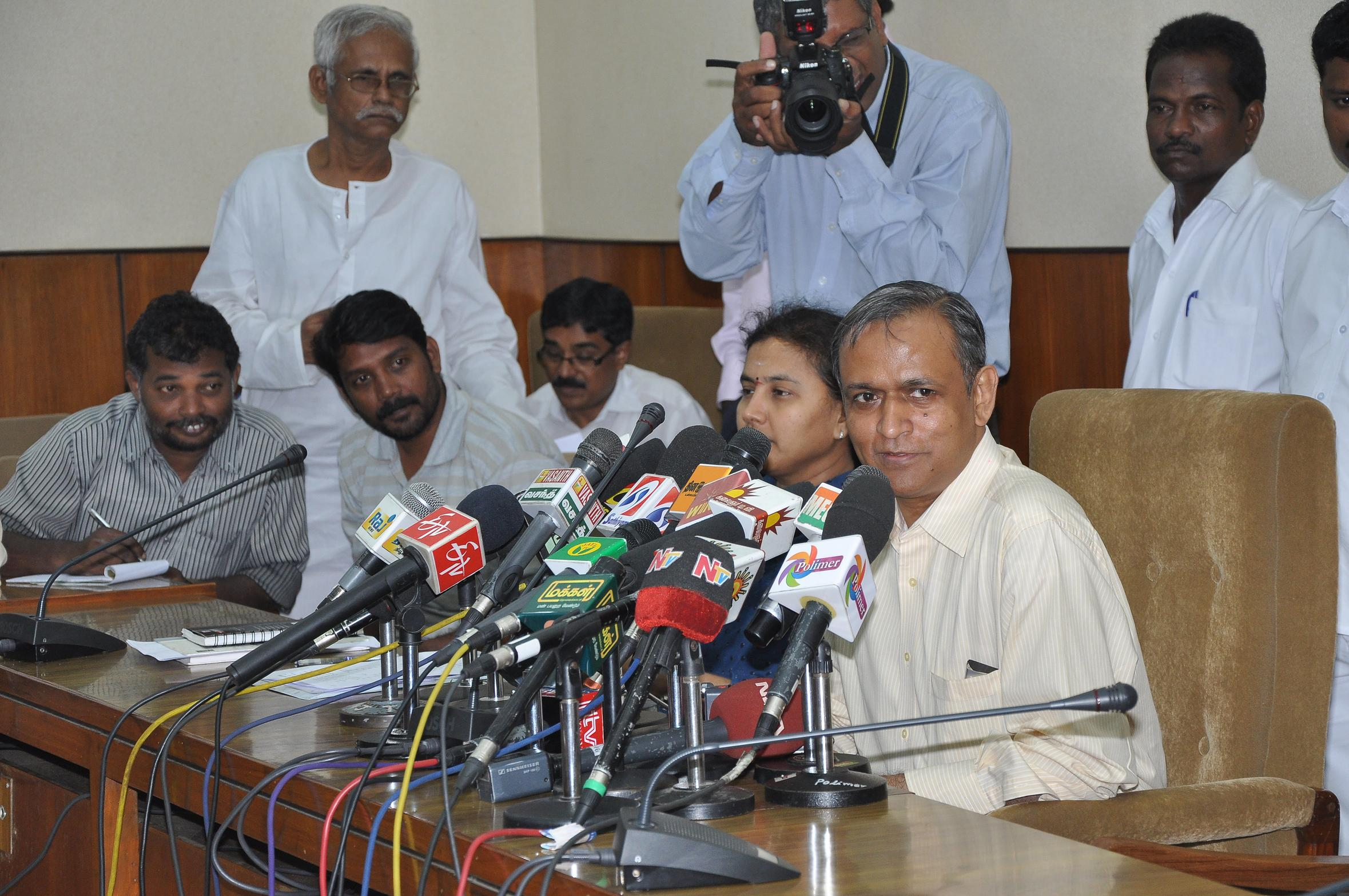
The commission headed by the chief electoral officer Praveen Kumar was commended for conducting the election strictly and fairly

The election commission enforced stringent measures to curb the widespread abuse of power to bribe voters that had been common in previous elections; it also imposed strict campaign discipline by imposing the 10 PM curfew.

The election recorded the highest polling ever in the state - 77.8% of the total electorate voted in the election, surpassing 76.57% polled in the 1967 election, till it was surpassed in the 2026 election with record percentage of 85.14%

The AIADMK-led front won a decisive victory, securing 203 constituencies. The AIADMK alone achieved a landslide majority with 150 seats, enabling it to form the government without coalition support. The DMDK won 29 seats, surpassing the DMK's 23, and chose to serve as the official opposition. Political analysts viewed the results as a referendum on the outgoing DMK government, with strong anti-incumbency sentiment propelling the AIADMK coalition to victory. 16 ministers from the outgoing Karunanidhi cabinet were defeated in their respective constituencies. On 16 May 2011, J. Jayalalithaa was sworn in as Chief Minister of Tamil Nadu for the fourth time, along with 33 ministers, by governor Surjit Singh Barnala.

== Background ==
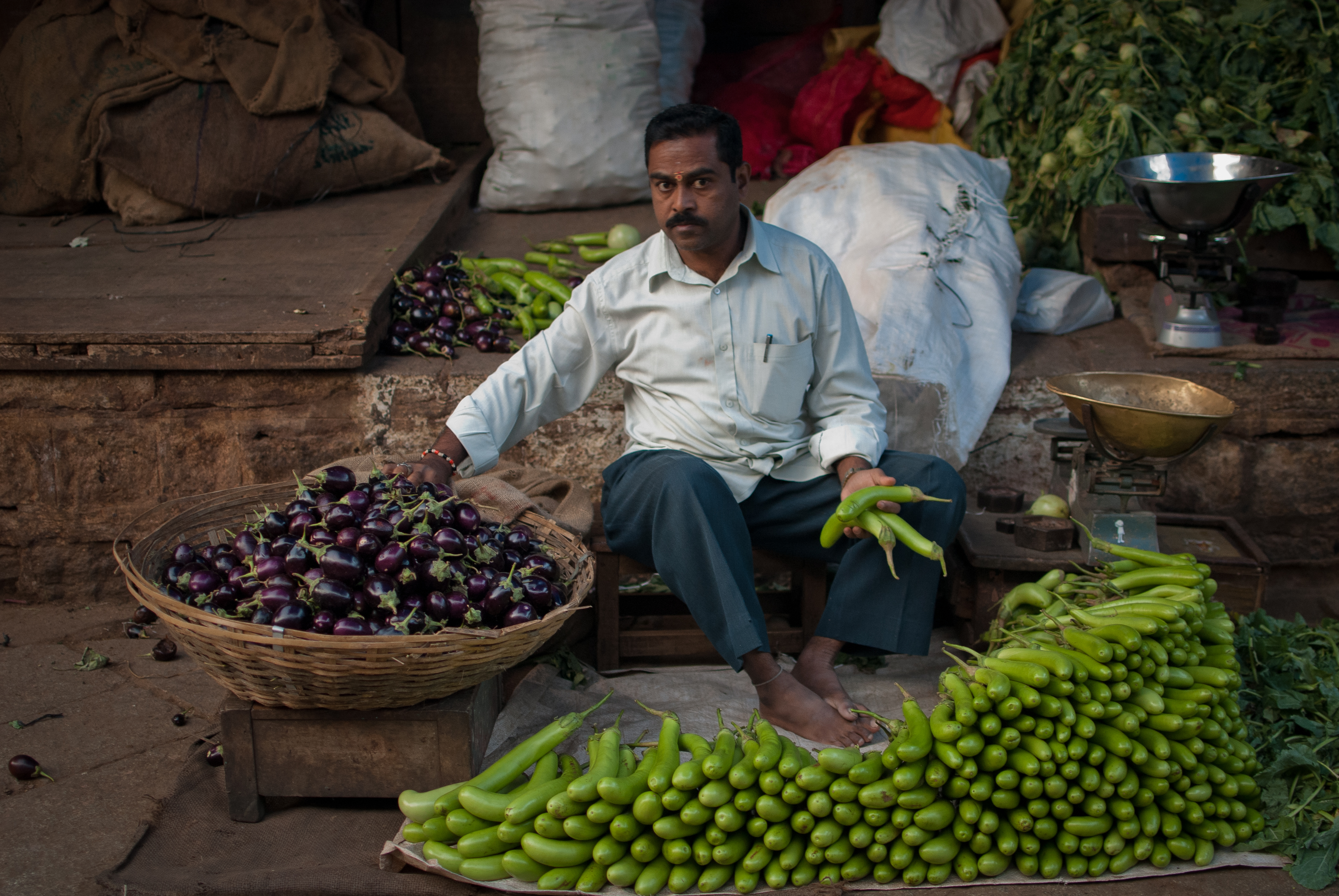
Rising food prices was an important issue in this election, especially for the poor who make up a large portion of the ruling parties' electorate

The Karunanidhi administration was noted for various developmental projects and generous spending of the tax money for the implementation of various free schemes and issuance of freebies: The government provided 1 kg rice for 1 rupee, free health insurance for poor, free colour television and gas stove for all. It also provided job for over 500,000 people in various departments of the government and introduced free concrete house scheme for the poor. It also implemented various road, bridge and drinking water projects in Chennai and all over Tamil Nadu. However, the election was dominated by four major issues, increase in price of essential commodities, 2G spectrum case, Power outage and nepotism.

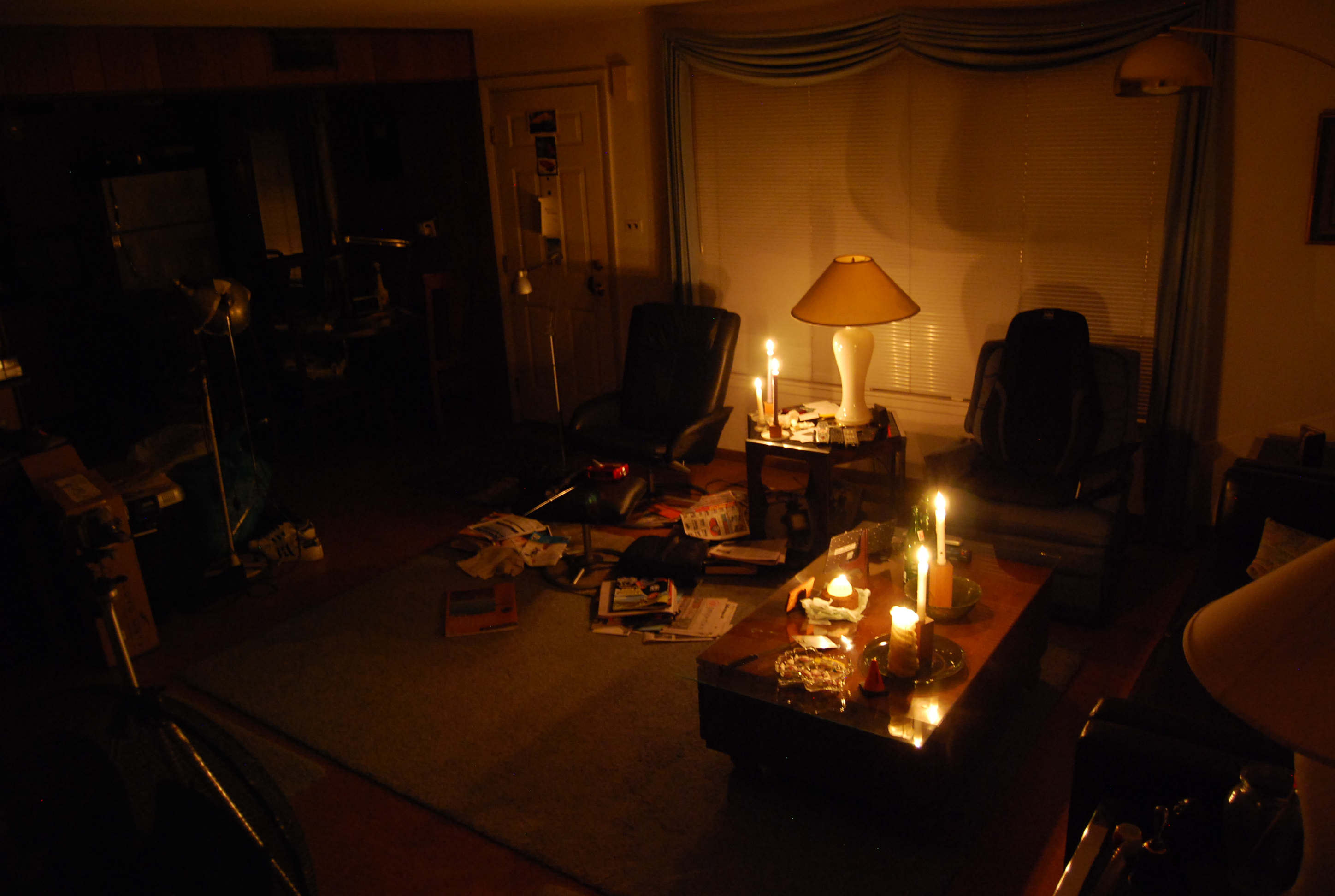
Power outages were one of the key issues in this election, with scheduled cuts of up to three hours and frequent unscheduled outages ranging from 30 minutes to an hour had become routine across the state.

Inflation was high during late 2010 to early 2011; The price of food and other essential commodities had increased exponentially affecting middle class and poor people: Onions were sold for Rs. 100, tomatoes for Rs. 80 and Jasmine flower for Rs. 1200 per kilo gram. This historical rise in price of essential food items was believed to be due to increased rainfall in North Indian states. The key issue that affected the people was electricity shortage in the State.

The 2G spectrum case involved the issue of 122 licenses of the 2G spectrum to 85 companies including many new telecom companies with little or no experience in the telecom sector at a price set in the year 2001. The case was alleged to have costed 677.19 billion ₹ (US$15.03 billion) to the Indian exchequer. A. Raja, Union telecommunications minister from Dravida Munnetra Kazhagam was arrested by Central Bureau of Investigation (CBI) in relation to the case. Kanimozhi, Rajya Sabha member from DMK and Chief minister's daughter and Sharad Kumar of Kalaignar TV were also included in the chargesheet filed by CBI. The five years of Karunanidhi's rule also saw an undue influence of his extended family members in various aspects of Tamil business and politics In late 2010, Jayalalithaa as an opposition leader held three big rallies to protest against the price rise and policies of UPA Government at the Centre and DMK Government in the State. The public meetings took place at Coimbatore on July 13, Trichy on August 14 and Madurai on October 18. These rallies drew lakhs of people, were seen as the shows of strength by the AIADMK ahead of the 2011 Assembly Election.

== Schedule ==
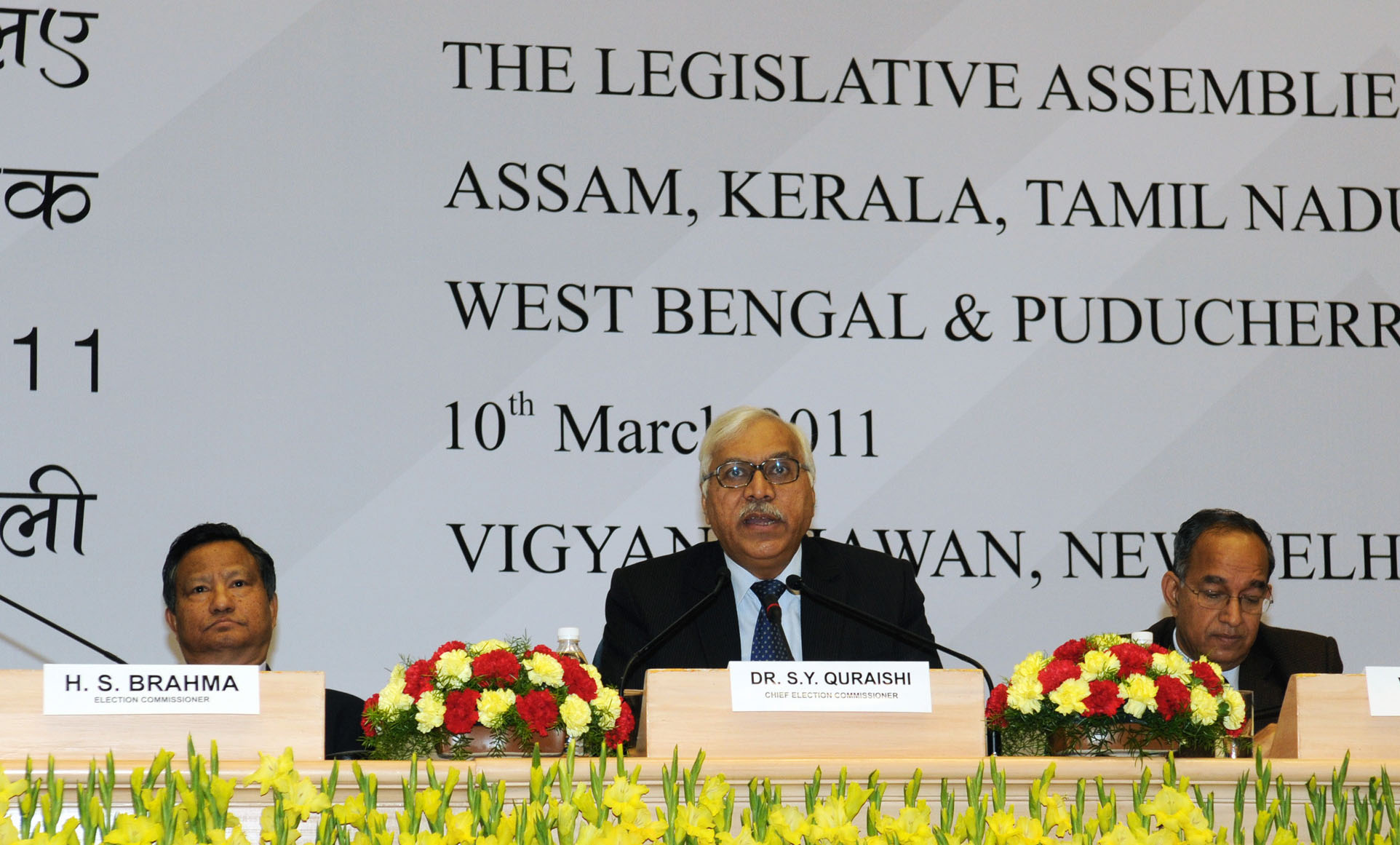
The Chief Election Commissioner of India, S. Y. Quraishi addressing at the Observer's briefing meeting in New Delhi on March 10, 2011, for Legislative Assembly election of Tamil Nadu along with those of Assam, Kerala, West Bengal, and Puducherry

Event	Date
Date for Nominations	19 March 2011
Last Date for filing Nominations	26 March 2011
Date for scrutiny of nominations	28 March 2011
Last date for withdrawal of candidatures	30 March 2011
Date of poll	13 April 2011
Date of counting	13 May 2011

== Parties and coalitions ==
=== All India Anna Dravida Munnetra Kazhagam coalition ===
Electoral alliances began to take shape in late 2010. J. Jayalalithaa, the leader of All India Anna Dravida Munnetra Kazhagam (AIADMK) characterised the election as a turning point in Tamil Nadu history similar to 1967 election. She was alluding to the major political changes that took place in Tamil Nadu after 1967 election in which Dravida Munnetra Kazhagam defeated Indian National Congress for the first time and subsequently, Congress has then never won an election in the state until date.

Manithaneya Makkal Katchi, political wing of Tamil Nadu Muslim Munnetra Kazhagam (TMMK) constituted a five-member committee to hold consultations with All India Anna Dravida Munnetra Kazhagam (AIADMK) for seat sharing. The party had decided to support AIADMK in a resolution adopted at a high-level meeting citing deteriorating law and order and corruption. Naam Tamilar Iyakkam coordinator Seeman also expressed his support for AIADMK on 10 January and said his decision is based on his opposition to INC which he claimed works against the interests of Sri Lankan Tamils. Cho Ramaswamy, founder of Thuglak magazine, was actively involved in the formation of alliances. He supported AIADMK and encouraged other parties to do so as well. On the 41st anniversary of the founding of Thuglak on 14 January, he delivered an address that strongly opposed ruling DMK party. He encouraged Desiya Murpokku Dravida Kazhagam (DMDK) to forge an alliance with AIADMK. Communist Party of India Tamil Nadu state secretary D. Pandian also called for DMDK to join the AIADMK coalition to defeat DMK and officially announced the continuation of CPI's coalition with AIADMK on 29 January. Communist Party of India (Marxist) (CPM) announced its decision to contest the election with AIADMK on 25 January.

Despite the strained relationship between Indian National Congress (INC) and Dravida Munnetra Kazhagam (DMK), AIADMK general secretary Jayalalithaa ruled out coalition with INC on 19 January. Tamil actor Karthik announced his party's (Ahila India Naadalum Makkal Katchi) support to AIADMK after meeting Jayalalithaa on 19 January. Hindu Munnani leader Rama Gopalan ruled out support to AIADMK coalition on 20 January citing the participation of anti-Hindu forces in the fold. DMDK officially announced their alliance with AIADMK and started their negotiations. This brought to an end the possibilities of third front and DMDK contesting the elections on their own.

Vijay's Makkal Iyakkam supported AIADMK Front. He delivered a speech in a rally attended by an estimated 20,000 to 30,000 people in Nagapattinam on 22 February condemning the actions of Sri Lankan military against Tamil Nadu fishermen. S. A. Chandrasekhar, noted film director and father of actor Vijay met with Jayalalithaa three times during the run-up to the election and announced Makkal Iyakkam's decision to support the AIADMK front in Tiruchirappalli on 27 March.

==== Seat allotment ====
In the middle of March, amidst discussion to finalise the allocation of constituencies, AIADMK surprised its allies by unilaterally deciding the 160 constituencies in which it will field candidates. The list included constituencies won by the CPI, CPM, Forward Bloc and Pudhiya Thamizhagam in the previous election. Marumalarchi Dravida Munnetra Kazhagam (MDMK) was allotted just 8 constituencies. After the coalition partners threatened to form a third front under DMDK, AIADMK gave in to their demands. Most of the seats AIADMK took from its alliance partners were given back bringing the standoff to an end. However MDMK was not given the number of seats it asked for and hence Vaiko left AIADMK led alliance and boycotted the elections.

=== Dravida Munnetra Kazhagam coalition ===
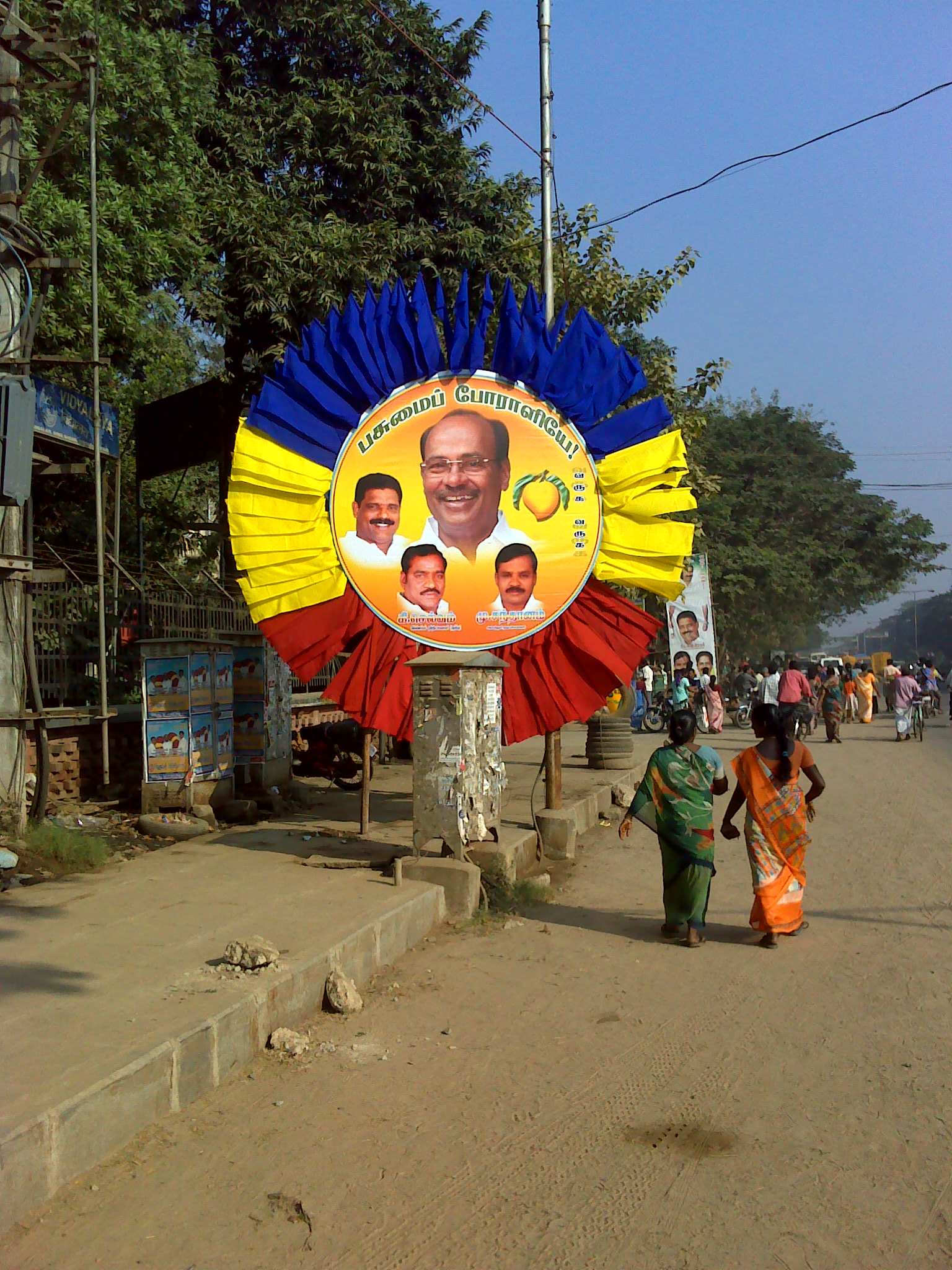
PMK poster in Chennai DMK was hoping to gain votes among the Vanniyar community with the addition of PMK, but that failed to materialise since they could only win 3 seats from 18 seats it won in 2006. With a disappointing performance in this election and losing all of the seats contested in 2009 Lok Sabha election when it allied with AIADMK, PMK is proving to no longer be an important player in Tamil Nadu politics

Tamil Nadu Congress Committee president K. V. Thankabalu confirmed the continuation of his party's alliance with DMK on 21 January. DMK pulled out of the ruling coalition at the centre on 5 March amid disagreements with Congress over seat sharing. After three days, the parties struck a deal in which DMK gave in to the demand and allowed Congress to contest in 63 seats. Abdul Rahman, Member of Parliament from Vellore constituency announced the continuation of Indian Union Muslim League's coalition with DMK on 24 January 2011. After meeting Karunanidhi at his home on 16 January, Viduthalai Chiruthaigal Katchi leader Thol. Thirumavalavan said his party will work for the victory of DMK coalition. In a speech given during the wedding of Hindu Religious and Charitable Endowments Minister Periyakaruppan's son in Chennai, Karunanidhi expressed his desire to step down from Chiefministership and continue as the leader of the party. Karunanidhi, during his trip to New Delhi for attending Chief Ministers meeting on 30 January, said that Indian National Congress, Viduthalai Chiruthaigal, Muslim League and Pattali Makkal Katchi are in the DMK coalition. But Ramadoss, the leader of PMK denied that and said no final decision has been taken on coalition. However PMK later joined the DMK alliance and was allotted 31 seats. It was later reduced to 30 to accommodate Congress which was firm on contesting 63 seats. Mylapore MLA and actor-turned politician S. V. Shekhar, joined Congress on 6 February 2011 after being expelled from AIADMK in 2009. Although Mylapore constituency was allotted to congress party, it did not give the chance to S.V. Shekhar. Instead the party allotted it to Jayanthi Thangabalu, the wife of TN Congress president K.V. Thangabalu. However her nomination was rejected by election commission citing incomplete submission of relevant documents. The nomination of K.V. Thangabalu, who was the replacement candidate was accepted making him the official congress candidate.

==== Seat allotment ====
Upset over the tough posture adopted by the Congress during the seat-sharing negotiations, Dravida Munnetra Kazhagam on 5 March decided to pull out its Ministers from the Union government and provide only issue-based support. A resolution to this effect was adopted at a meeting of the high-level committee of the party at Anna Arivalayam, the party headquarters. But after days of intense bargaining, Dravida Munnetra Kazhagam (DMK) and the Congress on 9 March struck a deal, under which the Congress would contest 63 seats.

=== Other parties and associations ===
Marumalarchi Dravida Munnetra Kazhagam (MDMK) boycotted the election following its withdrawal from the AIADMK alliance as AIADMK did not award the party any coalition constituency. Makkal Sakthi Katchi, the party founded by Jayaprakash Narayan contested in 35 constituencies in 18 districts. Some of the candidates of the party were members/coordinators from the non-government organisation 5th Pillar who were famous for issuing zero rupees notes to fight corruption. The party was headed in Tamil Nadu by a steering committee composed of six people including Vijay Anand of 5th Pilar.

Bharatiya Janata Party (BJP) although a major force in North India had struggled to make a foothold in Tamil Nadu . BJP leader L.Ganesan declared on 13 January that BJP will go alone in the elections . BJP announced its Candidate list on 18 March. Subramanian swamy leader of Janata Party announced JP will face the elections in alliance with BJP and will contest in 10 seats. JD(U) has announced it will contest 8 seats in alliance with BJP.

Tamil film actor Karthik's Ahila India Naadalum Makkal Katchi entered the election as a member of AIADMK coalition. When no seat was allocated to his party by AIADMK, he decided to contest the election alone in 25 to 40 seats. His party with sizeable Thevar votes in southern Tamil Nadu is believed to eat into the AIADMK votebank. In 2006, former AIADMK minister Nainar Nagendran lost by 2,000 votes in Tirunelveli, where Karthik's party polled more than the margin. Two weeks later his split from AIADMK, he announced his party will contest independently in 19 constituencies and support DMK in 213 constituencies.

Educationist-turned-politician T. R.Pachamuthu's Indiya Jananayaka Katchi (IJK) leads the third front. It comprises Tamizhaga Munnetra Kazhagam of John Pandian, Samooka Samathuva Padai of retired IAS officer, P Sivakami, Tamil Nadu Vanigar Peravai and VOC Peravai. The front is fielding candidates in more than 150 constituencies . Political observers feel that the IJK could poll 3,000 to 5,000 votes in many constituencies in Cuddalore, Villupuram, Perambalur, Ariyalur and Salem districts where Pachamuthu's Udayar community has sizeable presence. The Samooka Samathuva Padai will mobilise significant dalit votes in constituencies like Tindivanam, Krishnarayapuram, Haroor and Gangavalli. Sivakami herself is contesting from Gangavalli . John Pandian has some influence in Virudhunagar, Ramanathapuram, Thoothukudi, Dindigul and Tirunelveli districts.

Bahujan Samaj Party which is ruling in Uttar Pradesh has decided to field candidates for all 234 seats and will be contesting alone . The party announced its candidate list on 18 March. Puratchi Bharatham led by MLA JeganMurthy which was part of DMK alliance from 2004 left the alliance due to seat sharing issue. It contested 40 seats on its own. Social Democratic Party of India has also plunged into the Tamil Nadu election fray with a view to garnering Muslim votes. They are concentrating on Coimbatore, Ramanathapuram and some parts of Chennai. Ahila Indiya Parampariya Meenavar Sangam decided to contest in 27 constituencies that constitute a major population of fishermen. The decision was made in a meeting of fishermen's unions from across Tamil Nadu held in Pattinapakkam headed by its general secretary Rubeshkumar. Arundhathiar (a section of dalits) outfit headed by R Adhiyaman has fielded candidates in 20 segments in western Tamil Nadu .

== Seat Allocation by Alliance ==
=== AIADMK-led Alliance ===
The final seat allotment was:

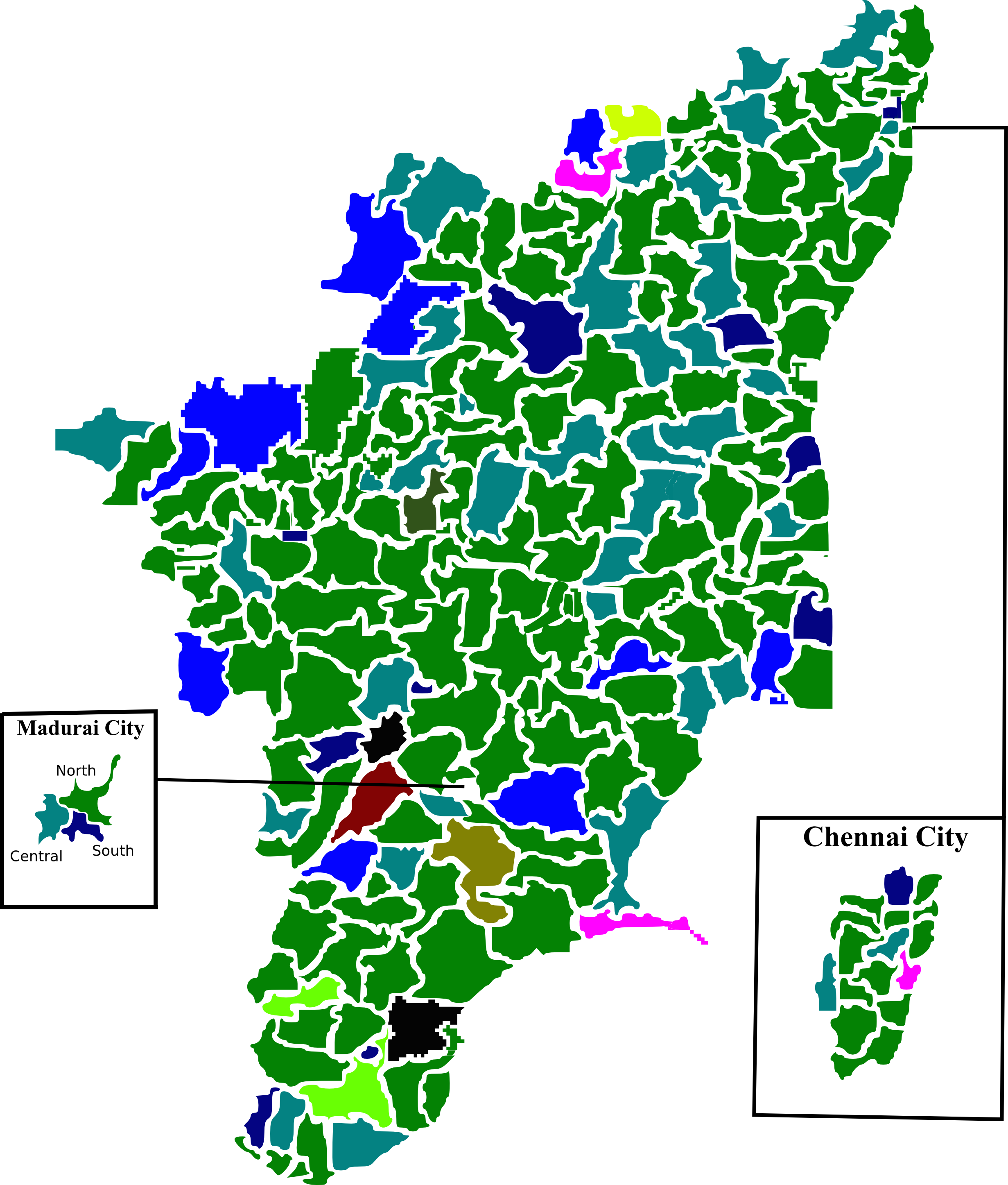
Election map based on parties contesting under the AIADMK alliance. Colours are based on the AIADMK front table on the left

AIADMK-led Alliance
Party	Flag	Symbol	Leader	Seat(s) Contested	
All India Anna Dravida Munnetra Kazhagam			J. Jayalalithaa	160	165
All India Samathuva Makkal Katchi			R. Sarathkumar	2	165
Republican Party of India			C. K. Thamizharasan	1	165
All India Moovendar Munnani Kazhagam			N. Sedhuraman	1	165
Tamil Nadu Kongu Ilaingar Peravai			U. Thaniyarasu	1	165
Desiya Murpokku Dravida Kazhagam			Vijayakanth	41	
Communist Party of India (Marxist)			G. Ramakrishnan	12	
Communist Party of India			D. Pandian	10	
Manithaneya Makkal Katchi			M. H. Jawahirullah	3	
Puthiya Tamilagam			K. Krishnasamy	2	
All India Forward Bloc			P. V. Kathiravan	1	
Total				234	

==== District Wise Seat Sharing ====
District	Seats							
District	Seats	ADK	DDK	CPM	CPI	MMK	PTA	FBL
Ariyalur	2	2	—N/a	—N/a	—N/a	—N/a	—N/a	—N/a
Chengalpattu	6	5	1	—N/a	—N/a	—N/a	—N/a	—N/a
Chennai	22	16	3	2	—N/a	1	—N/a	—N/a
Coimbatore	10	8	1	—N/a	1	—N/a	—N/a	—N/a
Cuddalore	9	5	3	1	—N/a	—N/a	—N/a	—N/a
Dharmapuri	5	2	1	1	1	—N/a	—N/a	—N/a
Dindigul	7	4	1	1	—N/a	—N/a	1	—N/a
Erode	8	6	1	—N/a	1	—N/a	—N/a	—N/a
Kallakurichi	4	3	1	—N/a	—N/a	—N/a	—N/a	—N/a
Kanchipuram	3	3	—N/a	—N/a	—N/a	—N/a	—N/a	—N/a
Kanyakumari	6	4	1	1	—N/a	—N/a	—N/a	—N/a
Karur	4	4	—N/a	—N/a	—N/a	—N/a	—N/a	—N/a
Krishnagiri	6	3	2	—N/a	1	—N/a	—N/a	—N/a
Madurai	10	6	2	1	—N/a	—N/a	—N/a	1
Mayiladuthurai	3	2	1	—N/a	—N/a	—N/a	—N/a	—N/a
Nagapattinam	3	2	—N/a	1	—N/a	—N/a	—N/a	—N/a
Namakkal	6	4	2	—N/a	—N/a	—N/a	—N/a	—N/a
Nilgiris	3	1	1	—N/a	1	—N/a	—N/a	—N/a
Perambalur	2	1	1	—N/a	—N/a	—N/a	—N/a	—N/a
Pudukkottai	6	5	—N/a	—N/a	1	—N/a	—N/a	—N/a
Ramanathapuram	4	2	1	—N/a	—N/a	1	—N/a	—N/a
Ranipet	4	3	1	—N/a	—N/a	—N/a	—N/a	—N/a
Salem	11	8	3	—N/a	—N/a	—N/a	—N/a	—N/a
Sivaganga	4	3	—N/a	—N/a	1	—N/a	—N/a	—N/a
Tenkasi	5	5	—N/a	—N/a	—N/a	—N/a	—N/a	—N/a
Thanjavur	8	6	2	—N/a	—N/a	—N/a	—N/a	—N/a
Theni	4	2	1	1	—N/a	—N/a	—N/a	—N/a
Thoothukudi	6	5	—N/a	—N/a	—N/a	—N/a	1	—N/a
Tiruchirappalli	9	7	2	—N/a	—N/a	—N/a	—N/a	—N/a
Tirunelveli	5	3	1	1	—N/a	—N/a	—N/a	—N/a
Tirupathur	4	3	—N/a	—N/a	—N/a	1	—N/a	—N/a
Tiruppur	8	7	—N/a	1	—N/a	—N/a	—N/a	—N/a
Tiruvallur	6	4	2	—N/a	—N/a	—N/a	—N/a	—N/a
Tiruvannamalai	8	6	2	—N/a	—N/a	—N/a	—N/a	—N/a
Tiruvarur	4	3	—N/a	—N/a	1	—N/a	—N/a	—N/a
Vellore	5	3	1	—N/a	1	—N/a	—N/a	—N/a
Viluppuram	7	4	2	1	—N/a	—N/a	—N/a	—N/a
Virudhunagar	7	5	1	—N/a	1	—N/a	—N/a	—N/a
Total	234	165	41	12	10	3	2	1

=== Democratic Progressive Alliance ===
The final seat allotment was:

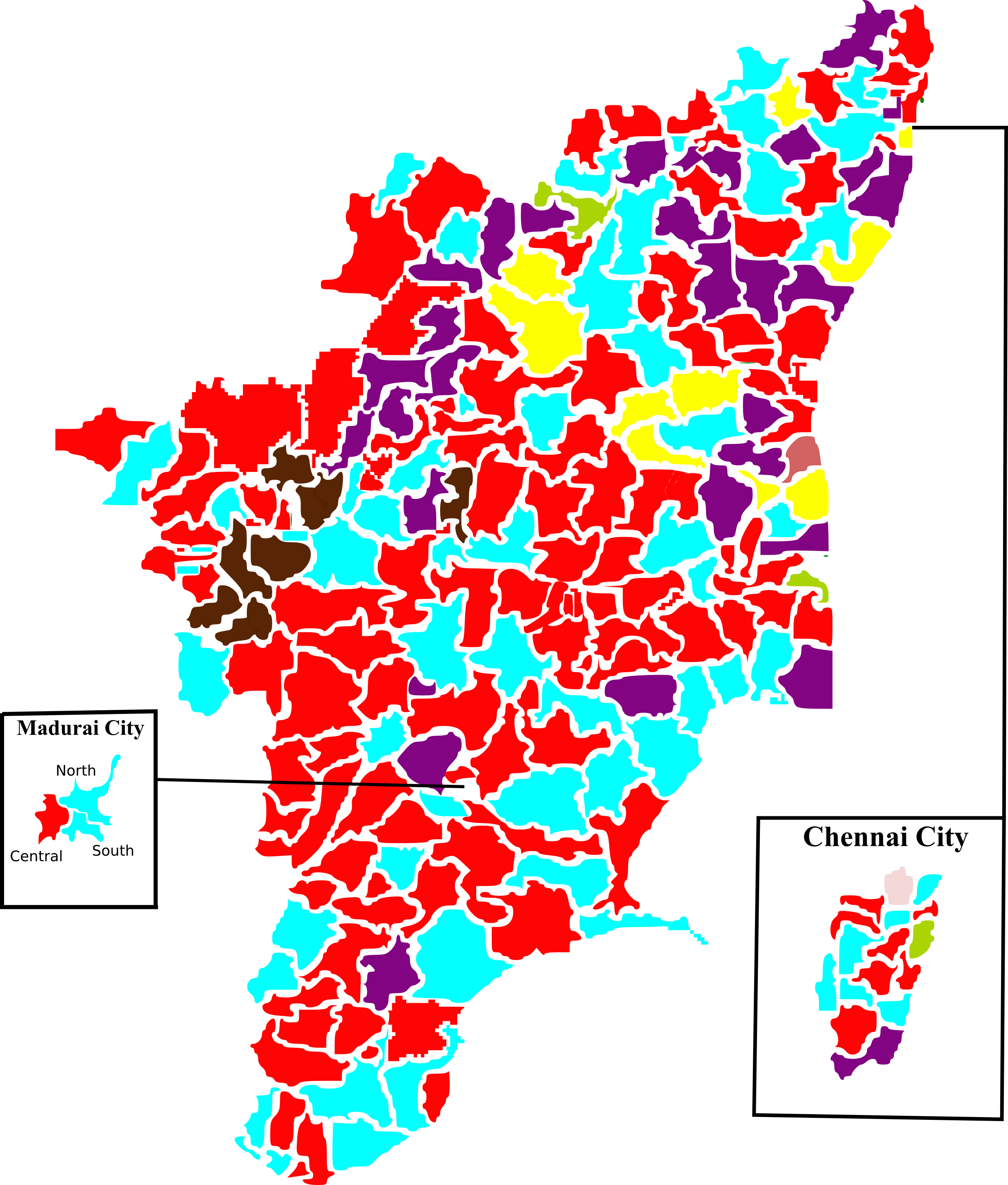
Election map based on parties contesting under the DMK alliance. Colours are based on the DMK front table on the left

Democratic Progressive Alliance
Party	Flag	Symbol	Leader	Seat(s) Contested	
Dravida Munnetra Kazhagam			M. Karunanidhi	119	124
Indian Union Muslim League			K. M. Kader Mohideen	3	124
Moovendar Munnetra Kazhagam			G. M. Sreedhar Vandaiyar	1	124
Perunthalaivar Makkal Katchi			N. R. Dhanapalan	1	124
Indian National Congress			K. V. Thangabalu	63	
Pattali Makkal Katchi			Dr. Ramadoss	30	
Viduthalai Chiruthaigal Katchi (Note: Election Commission of India allotted Television symbol to VCK in Arakkonam.)			Thol. Thirumavalavan	10	
Kongunadu Munnetra Kazhagam			Best Ramasamy	7	
Total				234	

==== District Wise Seat Sharing ====
District	Seats					
District	Seats	DMK	INC	PMK	VCK	KMK
Ariyalur	2	—N/a	1	1	—N/a	—N/a
Chengalpattu	6	2	1	2	1	—N/a
Chennai	22	13	6	2	1	—N/a
Coimbatore	10	5	3	—N/a	—N/a	2
Cuddalore	9	4	1	2	2	—N/a
Dharmapuri	5	2	—N/a	2	1	—N/a
Dindigul	7	4	2	1	—N/a	—N/a
Erode	8	3	2	1	—N/a	2
Kallakurichi	4	1	1	—N/a	2	—N/a
Kanchipuram	3	1	1	1	—N/a	—N/a
Kanyakumari	6	3	3	—N/a	—N/a	—N/a
Karur	4	3	1	—N/a	—N/a	—N/a
Krishnagiri	6	2	2	1	1	—N/a
Madurai	10	6	3	1	—N/a	—N/a
Mayiladuthurai	3	—N/a	1	1	1	—N/a
Nagapattinam	3	2	—N/a	1	—N/a	—N/a
Namakkal	6	3	1	1	—N/a	1
Nilgiris	3	2	1	—N/a	—N/a	—N/a
Perambalur	2	2	—N/a	—N/a	—N/a	—N/a
Pudukkottai	6	3	2	1	—N/a	—N/a
Ramanathapuram	4	2	2	—N/a	—N/a	—N/a
Ranipet	4	1	1	1	1	—N/a
Salem	11	6	2	3	—N/a	—N/a
Sivaganga	4	2	2	—N/a	—N/a	—N/a
Tenkasi	5	3	2	—N/a	—N/a	—N/a
Thanjavur	8	5	3	—N/a	—N/a	—N/a
Theni	4	4	—N/a	—N/a	—N/a	—N/a
Thoothukudi	6	3	2	1	—N/a	—N/a
Tiruchirappalli	9	7	2	—N/a	—N/a	—N/a
Tirunelveli	5	3	2	—N/a	—N/a	—N/a
Tirupathur	4	2	1	1	—N/a	—N/a
Tiruppur	8	3	3	—N/a	—N/a	2
Tiruvallur	6	2	3	1	—N/a	—N/a
Tiruvannamalai	8	4	3	1	—N/a	—N/a
Tiruvarur	4	3	1	—N/a	—N/a	—N/a
Vellore	5	3	1	1	—N/a	—N/a
Viluppuram	7	4	—N/a	3	—N/a	—N/a
Virudhunagar	7	6	1	—N/a	—N/a	—N/a
Total	234	124	63	30	10	7

=== National Democratic Alliance ===
S.No	Party	Election Symbol	Leader	Seats	Ref.
1.	Bharatiya Janata Party		Pon Radhakrishnan	204	
2.	Janata Party		Subramanian Swamy	10	
3.	Janata Dal (United)		Nitish Kumar	8	

== Alliance-wise contest ==
Note: As per the official party and symbol on which candidates contest in the respective seats.

Parties
Parties		DPA				
Parties		DMK	INC	PMK	VCK	KNMK
AIADMK+						
AIADMK+	AIADMK	84	40	22	8	6
AIADMK+	DMDK	18	15	6	1	1
AIADMK+	CPI(M)	7	2	2	1	—N/a
AIADMK+	CPI	7	3	—N/a	—N/a	—N/a
AIADMK+	MMK	1	2	—N/a	—N/a	—N/a
AIADMK+	PT	1	1	—N/a	—N/a	—N/a
AIADMK+	AIFB	1	—N/a	—N/a	—N/a	—N/a
Total		234				

== List of Candidates ==
District	Constituency		AIADMK+		DMK+	
District	#	Name	Party	Candidate	Party	Candidate
Tiruvallur	1	Gummidipoondi	DMDK	C. H. Sekar	PMK	K. N. Sekar
Tiruvallur	2	Ponneri (SC)	ADMK	Pon. Raja	DMK	A. Manimekalai
Tiruvallur	3	Tiruttani	DMDK	M. Arun Subramanian	INC	E. S. S. Raman
Tiruvallur	4	Thiruvallur	ADMK	B. V. Ramanaa	DMK	E. A. P. Sivaji
Tiruvallur	5	Poonamallee (SC)	ADMK	R. Manimaran	INC	Kanchi G. V. Mathiazhagan
Tiruvallur	6	Avadi	ADMK	S. Abdul Rahim	INC	R. Dhamotharan
Chennai	7	Maduravoyal	CPI(M)	G. Beem Rao	PMK	K. Selvam
Chennai	8	Ambattur	ADMK	S. Vedachalam	DMK	B. Ranaganathan
Chennai	9	Madavaram	ADMK	V. Moorthy	DMK	N. S. Kanimozhi
Chennai	10	Thiruvottiyur	ADMK	K. Kuppan	DMK	K. P. P. Samy
Chennai	11	R. K. Nagar	ADMK	P. Vetrivel	DMK	P. K. Sekar Babu
Chennai	12	Perambur	CPI(M)	A. Soundararajan	DMK	N. R. Dhanapalan (Note: Perunthalaivar Makkal Katchi contested on the "Rising Sun" symbol of the Dravida Munnetra Kazhagam (DMK), and is officially recorded as a DMK candidate in electoral records.)
Chennai	13	Kolathur	ADMK	Saidai Duraisamy	DMK	M. K. Stalin
Chennai	14	Villivakkam	ADMK	J. C. D. Prabhakar	DMK	K. Anbazhagan
Chennai	15	Thiru-Vi-Ka-Nagar (SC)	ADMK	V. Neelakandan	INC	Dr. C. Natesan
Chennai	16	Egmore (SC)	DMDK	K. Nalla Thambi	DMK	Parithi Ilamvazhuthi
Chennai	17	Royapuram	ADMK	D. Jayakumar	INC	R. Manohar
Chennai	18	Harbour	ADMK	Pala. Karuppiah	DMK	Altaf Hussain (Note: Indian Union Muslim League contested on the "Rising Sun" symbol of the Dravida Munnetra Kazhagam (DMK), and is officially recorded as a DMK candidate in electoral records.)
Chennai	19	Chepauk-Thiruvallikeni	MNMK	Thamimum Ansari	DMK	J. Anbazhagan
Chennai	20	Thousand Lights	ADMK	B. Valarmathi	DMK	Hasan Mohammed Jinnah
Chennai	21	Anna Nagar	ADMK	S. Gokula Indira	INC	V. K. Arivazhagan
Chennai	22	Virugampakkam	DMDK	B. Parthasarathy	DMK	K. Thanasekaran
Chennai	23	Saidapet	ADMK	G. Senthamizhan	DMK	M. Magesh Kumaar
Chennai	24	Thiyagarayanagar	ADMK	V. P. Kalairajan	INC	A. Chellakumar
Chennai	25	Mylapore	ADMK	R. Rajalakshmi	INC	K. V. Thangkabalu
Chennai	26	Velachery	ADMK	M. K. Ashok	PMK	M. Jayaraman
Chennai	27	Sholinganallur	ADMK	K. P. Kandan	VCK	S. S. Balaji
Chennai	28	Alandur	DMDK	S. Ramachandran	INC	K. Ghayathri Devi
Kanchipuram	29	Sriperumbudur (SC)	ADMK	R. Perumal	INC	D. Yasodha
Chengalpattu	30	Pallavaram	ADMK	P. Dhansingh	DMK	T. M. Anbarasan
Chengalpattu	31	Tambaram	ADMK	T. K. M. Chinnayya	DMK	S. R. Raja
Chengalpattu	32	Chengalpattu	DMDK	D. Murugesan	PMK	V. G. Rangasamy
Chengalpattu	33	Thiruporur	ADMK	K. Manoharan	PMK	K. Arumugam
Chengalpattu	34	Cheyyur (SC)	ADMK	V. S. Raji	VCK	D. Parventhan
Chengalpattu	35	Madurantakam (SC)	ADMK	S. Kanitha Sampath	INC	K. Jayakumar
Kanchipuram	36	Uthiramerur	ADMK	P. Ganesan	DMK	Ponkumar
Kanchipuram	37	Kancheepuram	ADMK	V. Somasundaram	PMK	P. S. Ulagarakshagan
Ranipet	38	Arakkonam (SC)	ADMK	S. Ravi	VCK	S. Sellapandian
Ranipet	39	Sholingur	DMDK	P. R. Manogar	INC	Arulanbarasu
Vellore	40	Katpadi	ADMK	S. R. K. Appu	DMK	Durai Murugan
Ranipet	41	Ranipet	ADMK	A. Mohammedjan	DMK	R. Gandhi
Ranipet	42	Arcot	ADMK	R. Srinivasan	PMK	K. L. Elavazagan
Vellore	43	Vellore	ADMK	V. S. Vijay	INC	C. Gnanasekharan
Vellore	44	Anaikattu	DMDK	V. B. Velu	PMK	M. Kalai Arasu
Vellore	45	Kilvaithinankuppam (SC)	ADMK	C. K. Thamizharasan (Note: Republican Party of India contested on the "Two Leaves" symbol of the All India Anna Dravida Munnetra Kazhagam (AIADMK), and is officially recorded as a AIADMK candidate in electoral records.)	DMK	K. Seetharaman
Vellore	46	Gudiyattam (SC)	CPI	K. Lingamuthu	DMK	K. Rajamarthandan
Tirupathur	47	Vaniyambadi	ADMK	Govi. Sampath Kumar	DMK	H. Abdul Basith
Tirupathur	48	Ambur	MNMK	A. Aslam Basha	INC	J. Vijay Elanchezian
Tirupathur	49	Jolarpet	ADMK	K. C. Veeramani	PMK	G. Ponnusamy
Tirupathur	50	Tirupattur	ADMK	K. G. Ramesh	DMK	S. Rajendran
Krishnagiri	51	Uthangarai (SC)	ADMK	Manoranjitham Nagaraj	VCK	Muniyammal
Krishnagiri	52	Bargur	ADMK	K. E. Krishnamoorthi	PMK	T. K. Raja
Krishnagiri	53	Krishnagiri	ADMK	K. P. Munusamy	INC	Syed Ghiyas Ul Haq
Krishnagiri	54	Veppanahalli	DMDK	S. M. Kandan	DMK	T. Senguttuvan
Krishnagiri	55	Hosur	DMDK	S. John Timothy	INC	K. Gopinath
Krishnagiri	56	Thalli	CPI	T. Ramachandran	DMK	Y. Prakaash
Dharmapuri	57	Palacodu	ADMK	K. P. Anbalagan	PMK	V. Selvam
Dharmapuri	58	Pennagaram	CPI	N. Nanjappan	DMK	P. N. P. Inbasekaran
Dharmapuri	59	Dharmapuri	DMDK	A. Baskar	PMK	P. Santhamoorthy
Dharmapuri	60	Pappireddippatti	ADMK	P. Palaniappan	DMK	V. Mullaivendhan
Dharmapuri	61	Harur (SC)	CPI(M)	P. Dillibabu	VCK	B. M. Nandhan
Tiruvannamalai	62	Chengam (SC)	DMDK	T. Suresh	INC	K. Selvaperunthagai
Tiruvannamalai	63	Tiruvannamalai	ADMK	S. Ramachandran	DMK	E. V. Velu
Tiruvannamalai	64	Kilpennathur	ADMK	A. K. Aranganathan	DMK	K. Pitchandi
Tiruvannamalai	65	Kalasapakkam	ADMK	Agri S. S. Krishnamurthy	INC	P. S. Vijayakumar
Tiruvannamalai	66	Polur	ADMK	L. Jaya Sudha	PMK	G. Edirolimanian
Tiruvannamalai	67	Arani	DMDK	R. M. Babu Murugavel	DMK	R. Sivanandham
Tiruvannamalai	68	Cheyyar	ADMK	N. Subramanian	INC	M. K. Vishnu Prasad
Tiruvannamalai	69	Vandavasi (SC)	ADMK	V. Gunaseelan	DMK	J. Kamalakkannan
Viluppuram	70	Gingee	DMDK	R. Sivalingam	PMK	A. Ganeshkumar
Viluppuram	71	Mailam	ADMK	K. P. Nagarajan	PMK	R. Prakash
Viluppuram	72	Tindivanam (SC)	ADMK	D. Haridoss	PMK	M. P. Sankar
Viluppuram	73	Vanur (SC)	ADMK	I. Janagiraman	DMK	S. Pushparaj
Viluppuram	74	Villupuram	ADMK	C. V. Shanmugam	DMK	K. Ponmudy
Viluppuram	75	Vikravandi	CPI(M)	R. Ramamurthy	DMK	K. Rathamani
Viluppuram	76	Tirukkoyilur	DMDK	L. Venkatesan	DMK	M. Thangam
Kallakurichi	77	Ulundurpettai	ADMK	R. Kumaraguru	VCK	M. Mohamed Yousuf
Kallakurichi	78	Rishivandiyam	DMDK	Vijayakanth	INC	S. Sivaraj
Kallakurichi	79	Sankarapuram	ADMK	P. Mohan	DMK	T. Udhayasuriyan
Kallakurichi	80	Kallakurichi (SC)	ADMK	K. Alaguvelu	VCK	A. C. Pavarasu
Salem	81	Gangavalli (SC)	DMDK	R. Subha	DMK	K. Chinnadurai
Salem	82	Attur (SC)	ADMK	S. Madheswaran	INC	S. K. Arthanari
Salem	83	Yercaud (ST)	ADMK	C. Perumal	DMK	C. Tamilselvan
Salem	84	Omalur	ADMK	C. Krishnan	PMK	A. Tamizharasu
Salem	85	Mettur	DMDK	S. R. Parthiban	PMK	G. K. Mani
Salem	86	Edappadi	ADMK	Edappadi K. Palaniswami	PMK	M. Karthe
Salem	87	Sankari	ADMK	P. Vijayalakshmi	DMK	Veerapandy S. Arumugam
Salem	88	Salem (West)	ADMK	G. Venkatachalam	DMK	R. Rajendran
Salem	89	Salem (North)	DMDK	Alagaapuram R. Mohanraj	INC	G. Jayaprakash
Salem	90	Salem (South)	ADMK	M. K. Selvaraju	DMK	S. R. Sivalingam
Salem	91	Veerapandi	ADMK	S. K. Selvam	DMK	A. Rajendran
Namakkal	92	Rasipuram (SC)	ADMK	P. Dhanapal	DMK	V. P. Duraisamy
Namakkal	93	Senthamangalam (ST)	DMDK	R. Santhi	DMK	K. Ponnusamy
Namakkal	94	Namakkal	ADMK	K. P. P. Baskar	KNMK	R. Devarasan
Namakkal	95	Paramathi-Velur	ADMK	U. Thaniyarasu (Note: Tamil Nadu Kongu Ilaingar Peravai contested on the "Two Leaves" symbol of the All India Anna Dravida Munnetra Kazhagam (AIADMK), and is officially recorded as a AIADMK candidate in electoral records.)	PMK	C. Vadivel
Namakkal	96	Tiruchengodu	DMDK	P. Sampath Kumar	INC	M. R. Sundaram
Namakkal	97	Kumarapalayam	ADMK	P. Thangamani	DMK	G. Selvaraju
Erode	98	Erode (East)	DMDK	V. C. Chandhirakumar	DMK	S. Muthusamy
Erode	99	Erode (West)	ADMK	K. V. Ramalingam	INC	M. Yuvaraja
Erode	100	Modakkurichi	ADMK	R. N. Kittusamy	INC	R. M. Palanisami
Tiruppur	101	Dharapuram (SC)	ADMK	K. Ponnusamy	DMK	R. Jayanthi
Tiruppur	102	Kangayam	ADMK	N. S. N. Nataraj	INC	S. Videyal Sekar
Erode	103	Perundurai	ADMK	N. D. Venkatachalam	KNMK	K. K. C. Balu
Erode	104	Bhavani	ADMK	P. G. Narayanan	PMK	K. S. Mahendran
Erode	105	Anthiyur	ADMK	S. S. Ramanitharan	DMK	N. K. K. P. Raja
Erode	106	Gobichettipalayam	ADMK	K. A. Sengottaiyan	KNMK	N. S. Sivaraj
Erode	107	Bhavanisagar (SC)	CPI	P. L. Sundaram	DMK	R. Logeswari
Nilgiris	108	Udhagamandalam	ADMK	Budhichandhiran	INC	R. Ganesh
Nilgiris	109	Gudalur (SC)	DMDK	S. Selvaraj	DMK	M. Thiravidamani
Nilgiris	110	Coonoor	CPI	A. Bellie	DMK	K. Ramachandran
Coimbatore	111	Mettuppalayam	ADMK	O. K. Chinnaraj	DMK	B. Arunkumar
Tiruppur	112	Avanashi (SC)	ADMK	A. A. Karuppasamy	INC	A. R. Natarajan
Tiruppur	113	Tiruppur (North)	ADMK	M. S. M. Anandan	DMK	C. Govindasamy
Tiruppur	114	Tiruppur (South)	CPI(M)	K. Thangavel	INC	K. Senthilkumar
Tiruppur	115	Palladam	ADMK	K. P. Paramasivam	KNMK	K. Balasubramanian
Coimbatore	116	Sulur	DMDK	K. Thinakaran	KNMK	E. R. Eswaran
Coimbatore	117	Kavundampalayam	ADMK	V. C. Arukutty	DMK	T. P. Subramanian
Coimbatore	118	Coimbatore (North)	ADMK	T. Malaravan	DMK	M. Veeragopal
Coimbatore	119	Thondamuthur	ADMK	S. P. Velumani	INC	M. N. Kandaswamy
Coimbatore	120	Coimbatore (South)	ADMK	R. Doraisamy	DMK	Pongalur N. Palanisamy
Coimbatore	121	Singanallur	ADMK	R. Chinnaswamy	INC	Mayura S. Jayakumar
Coimbatore	122	Kinathukadavu	ADMK	S. Damodaran	DMK	M. Kannappan
Coimbatore	123	Pollachi	ADMK	M. K. Muthukaruppannasamy	KNMK	K. Nithyanandhan
Coimbatore	124	Valparai (SC)	CPI	M. Arumugham	INC	N. Kovaithangam
Tiruppur	125	Udumalaipettai	ADMK	Pollachi Jayaraman V	KNMK	T. Ilamparithi
Tiruppur	126	Madathukulam	ADMK	C. Shanmugavelu	DMK	M. P. Saminathan
Dindigul	127	Palani	ADMK	K. S. N. Venugopalu	DMK	I. P. Senthil Kumar
Dindigul	128	Oddanchatram	ADMK	P. Baalasubramani	DMK	R. Sakkarapani
Dindigul	129	Athoor	DMDK	S. Balasubramani	DMK	I. Periyasamy
Dindigul	130	Nilakkottai (SC)	PT	A. Ramasamy	INC	K. Rajangam
Dindigul	131	Natham	ADMK	Natham R. Viswanathan	DMK	K. Vijayan
Dindigul	132	Dindigul	CPI(M)	K. Balabharathi	PMK	J. Paul Baskar
Dindigul	133	Vedasandur	ADMK	S. Palanichamy	INC	M. Dhandapani
Karur	134	Aravakurichi	ADMK	V. Senthilnathan	DMK	K. C. Pallanishamy
Karur	135	Karur	ADMK	V. Senthil Balaji	INC	Jothimani
Karur	136	Krishnarayapuram (SC)	ADMK	S. Kamaraj	DMK	P. Kamaraj
Karur	137	Kulithalai	ADMK	A. Pappa Sundaram	DMK	R. Manickam
Tiruchirappalli	138	Manapparai	ADMK	R. Chandrasekar	INC	Subbha Somu
Tiruchirappalli	139	Srirangam	ADMK	J. Jayalalithaa	DMK	N. Anand
Tiruchirappalli	140	Tiruchirappalli (West)	ADMK	M. Mariam Pichai	DMK	K. N. Nehru
Tiruchirappalli	141	Tiruchirappalli (East)	ADMK	R. Manoharan	DMK	Anbil Periyasamy
Tiruchirappalli	142	Thiruverumbur	DMDK	S. Senthilkumar	DMK	K. N. Seharan
Tiruchirappalli	143	Lalgudi	DMDK	A. D. Sendhureswaran	DMK	A. Soundara Pandian
Tiruchirappalli	144	Manachanallur	ADMK	T. P. Poonatchi	DMK	N. Selvaraj
Tiruchirappalli	145	Musiri	ADMK	N. R. Sivapathi	INC	M. Rajasekharan
Tiruchirappalli	146	Thuraiyur (SC)	ADMK	T. Indragandhi	DMK	S. Parimala Devi
Perambalur	147	Perambalur (SC)	ADMK	R. Thamizhselvan	DMK	M. Prabhakaran
Perambalur	148	Kunnam	DMDK	Durai Kamaraj	DMK	S. S. Sivasankar
Ariyalur	149	Ariyalur	ADMK	Durai Manivel	INC	D. Amaramoorthy
Ariyalur	150	Jayankondam	ADMK	P. Elavazhagan	PMK	J. Guru
Cuddalore	151	Tittakudi (SC)	DMDK	K. Tamil Azhagan	VCK	M. Sinthanaiselvan
Cuddalore	152	Vriddhachalam	DMDK	V. Muthukumar	INC	T. Neethirajan
Cuddalore	153	Neyveli	ADMK	M. P. S. Sivasubramaniyan	PMK	T. Velmurugan
Cuddalore	154	Panruti	DMDK	P. Sivakozhundu	DMK	Saba Rajendran
Cuddalore	155	Cuddalore	ADMK	M. C. Sampath	DMK	E. Pugazhendi
Cuddalore	156	Kurinjipadi	ADMK	R. Rajendran	DMK	M. R. K. Panneerselvam
Cuddalore	157	Bhuvanagiri	ADMK	R. Selvi	PMK	T. Arivuselvan
Cuddalore	158	Chidambaram	CPI(M)	K. Balakrishnan	DMK	Sridhar Vandaiyar (Note: Moovendar Munnetra Kazhagam contested on the "Rising Sun" symbol of the Dravida Munnetra Kazhagam (DMK), and is officially recorded as a DMK candidate in electoral records.)
Cuddalore	159	Kattumannarkoil (SC)	ADMK	N. Murugumaran	VCK	D. Ravikumar
Mayiladuthurai	160	Sirkazhi (SC)	ADMK	M. Sakthi	VCK	P. Durairajan
Mayiladuthurai	161	Mayiladuthurai	DMDK	R. Arulselvan	INC	S. Rajakumar
Mayiladuthurai	162	Poompuhar	ADMK	S. Pavunraj	PMK	K. Agoram
Nagapattinam	163	Nagapattinam	ADMK	K. A. Jayapal	DMK	Mohamed Sheik Dawood
Nagapattinam	164	Kilvelur (SC)	CPI(M)	P. Mahalingam	DMK	U. Mathivanan
Nagapattinam	165	Vedaranyam	ADMK	N. V. Kamaraj	PMK	R. Chinnathurai
Tiruvarur	166	Thiruthuraipoondi (SC)	CPI	K. Ulaganathan	INC	P. Selvadurai
Tiruvarur	167	Mannargudi	ADMK	Rajamanickam Siva	DMK	T. R. B. Rajaa
Tiruvarur	168	Thiruvarur	ADMK	M. Rajendran	DMK	M. Karunanidhi
Tiruvarur	169	Nannilam	ADMK	R. Kamaraj	DMK	R. Elangovan
Thanjavur	170	Thiruvidaimarudur (SC)	ADMK	T. Pandiyarajan	DMK	Govi. Chezhian
Thanjavur	171	Kumbakonam	ADMK	Rama Ramanathan	DMK	G. Anbalagan
Thanjavur	172	Papanasam	ADMK	R. Doraikkannu	INC	M. Ramkumar
Thanjavur	173	Thiruvaiyaru	ADMK	M. Rethinasami	DMK	S. Aranganathan
Thanjavur	174	Thanjavur	ADMK	M. Rengasamy	DMK	S. N. M. Ubayadullah
Thanjavur	175	Orathanadu	ADMK	R. Vaithilingam	DMK	T. Mahesh Krishnasamy
Thanjavur	176	Pattukkottai	DMDK	N. Senthilkumar	INC	N. R. Rengarajan
Thanjavur	177	Peravurani	DMDK	Arun Pandian	INC	K. Mahendran
Pudukkottai	178	Gandharvakottai (SC)	ADMK	N. Subramanian	DMK	S. Kavithaipithan
Pudukkottai	179	Viralimalai	ADMK	C. Vijayabaskar	DMK	S. Regupathy
Pudukkottai	180	Pudukkottai	CPI	S. P. Muthukumaran	DMK	Periyannan Arassu
Pudukkottai	181	Thirumayam	ADMK	P. K. Vairamuthu	INC	R. M. Subburam
Pudukkottai	182	Alangudi	ADMK	Ku. Pa. Krishnan	PMK	S. Arulmani
Pudukkottai	183	Aranthangi	ADMK	M. Rajanayagam	INC	Su. Thirunavukkarasar
Sivaganga	184	Karaikudi	ADMK	Cholan C. T. Palanichamy	INC	Ramasamy KR
Sivaganga	185	Tiruppattur	ADMK	Raja Kannappan	DMK	K. R. Periyakaruppan
Sivaganga	186	Sivaganga	CPI	Gunasekaran S	INC	V. Rajasekaran
Sivaganga	187	Manamadurai (SC)	ADMK	M. Gunasekaran	DMK	A. Tamilarasi
Madurai	188	Melur	ADMK	Melur R. Samy	DMK	R. Rani
Madurai	189	Madurai East	ADMK	K. Tamilarasan	DMK	P. Moorthy
Madurai	190	Sholavandan (SC)	ADMK	M. V. Karuppiah	PMK	M. Ilanseliyan
Madurai	191	Madurai North	ADMK	A. K. Bose	INC	K. S. K. Rajendran
Madurai	192	Madurai South	CPI(M)	R. Annadurai	INC	S. P. Varadharajan
Madurai	193	Madurai Central	DMDK	R. Sundarrajan	DMK	Syed Ghouse Basha
Madurai	194	Madurai West	ADMK	Sellur K. Raju	DMK	G. Thalapathi
Madurai	195	Thiruparankundram	DMDK	A. K. T. Raja	INC	C. R. Sundararajan
Madurai	196	Thirumangalam	ADMK	M. Muthuramalingam	DMK	M. Manimaran
Madurai	197	Usilampatti	AIFB	P. V. Kathiravan	DMK	S. O. Ramasamy
Theni	198	Andipatti	ADMK	Thanga Tamil Selvan	DMK	L. Mookiah
Theni	199	Periyakulam (SC)	CPI(M)	A. Laser	DMK	V. Anbazhagan
Theni	200	Bodinayakanur	ADMK	O. Panneerselvam	DMK	S. Lakshmanan
Theni	201	Cumbum	DMDK	P. Murugesan	DMK	N. Eramakrishnan
Virudhunagar	202	Rajapalayam	ADMK	K. Gopalsamy	DMK	S. Thanga Pandian
Virudhunagar	203	Srivilliputhur (SC)	CPI	V. Ponnupandi	DMK	R. V. K. Durai
Virudhunagar	204	Sattur	ADMK	R. B. Udhayakumar	DMK	A. Kadarkarairaj
Virudhunagar	205	Sivakasi	ADMK	K. T. Rajenthra Bhalaji	DMK	T. Vanaraja
Virudhunagar	206	Virudhunagar	DMDK	K. Pandiarajan	INC	T. Armstrong Naveen
Virudhunagar	207	Aruppukkottai	ADMK	Vaigaichelvan	DMK	K. K. S. S. R. Ramachandran
Virudhunagar	208	Tiruchuli	ADMK	Esakki Muthu (Note: All India Moovendar Munnani Kazhagam contested on the "Two Leaves" symbol of the All India Anna Dravida Munnetra Kazhagam (AIADMK), and is officially recorded as a AIADMK candidate in electoral records.)	DMK	Thangam Thennarasu
Ramanathapuram	209	Paramakudi (SC)	ADMK	S. Sundararaj	INC	R. Ramprabhu
Ramanathapuram	210	Tiruvadanai	DMDK	S. Mujupur Rahman	DMK	Suba Thangavelan
Ramanathapuram	211	Ramanathapuram	MNMK	M. H. Jawahirullah	INC	K. Hussan Ali
Ramanathapuram	212	Mudhukulathur	ADMK	M. Murugan	DMK	V. Sathiamoorthy
Thoothukudi	213	Vilathikulam	ADMK	G. V. Markandayan	INC	K. Perumalsamy
Thoothukudi	214	Thoothukkudi	ADMK	S. T. Chellapandian	DMK	P. Geetha Jeevan
Thoothukudi	215	Tiruchendur	ADMK	P. R. Manoharan	DMK	Anitha R. Radhakrishnan
Thoothukudi	216	Srivaikuntam	ADMK	S. P. Shunmuganathan	INC	M. B. Sudalaiyandi
Thoothukudi	217	Ottapidaram (SC)	PT	K. Krishnasamy	DMK	S. Raja
Thoothukudi	218	Kovilpatti	ADMK	Kadambur Raju	PMK	G. Ramachandran
Tenkasi	219	Sankarankovil (SC)	ADMK	C. Karuppasamy	DMK	M. Umamaheswari
Tenkasi	220	Vasudevanallur (SC)	ADMK	S. Duraiappa	INC	S. Ganesan
Tenkasi	221	Kadayanallur	ADMK	P. Chendur Pandian	INC	S. Peter Alphonse
Tenkasi	222	Tenkasi	ADMK	R. Sarathkumar (Note: All India Samathuva Makkal Katchi contested on the "Two Leaves" symbol of the All India Anna Dravida Munnetra Kazhagam (AIADMK), and is officially recorded as a AIADMK candidate in electoral records.)	DMK	Karuppasamy Pandian
Tenkasi	223	Alangulam	ADMK	P. G. Rajendran	DMK	Poongothai Aladi Aruna
Tirunelveli	224	Tirunelveli	ADMK	Nainar Nagendran	DMK	A. L. S. Lakshmanan
Tirunelveli	225	Ambasamudram	ADMK	E. Subaya	DMK	R. Avudaiyappan
Tirunelveli	226	Palayamkottai	CPI(M)	V. Palani	DMK	T. P. M. Mohideen Khan
Tirunelveli	227	Nanguneri	ADMK	A. Narayanan	INC	H. Vasanthakumar
Tirunelveli	228	Radhapuram	DMDK	S. Michael Rayappan	INC	P. Veldurai
Kanyakumari	229	Kanniyakumari	ADMK	K. T. Pachaimal	DMK	N. Suresh Rajan
Kanyakumari	230	Nagercoil	ADMK	A. Nanjil Murugesan	DMK	R. Mahesh
Kanyakumari	231	Colachal	ADMK	P. Larence	INC	J. G. Prince
Kanyakumari	232	Padmanabhapuram	DMDK	S. Austin	DMK	Pushpa Leela Alban
Kanyakumari	233	Vilavancode	CPI(M)	R. Leema Rose	INC	S. Vijayadharani
Kanyakumari	234	Killiyoor	ADMK	R. George	INC	S. John Jacob

== Campaign ==
=== AIADMK front ===
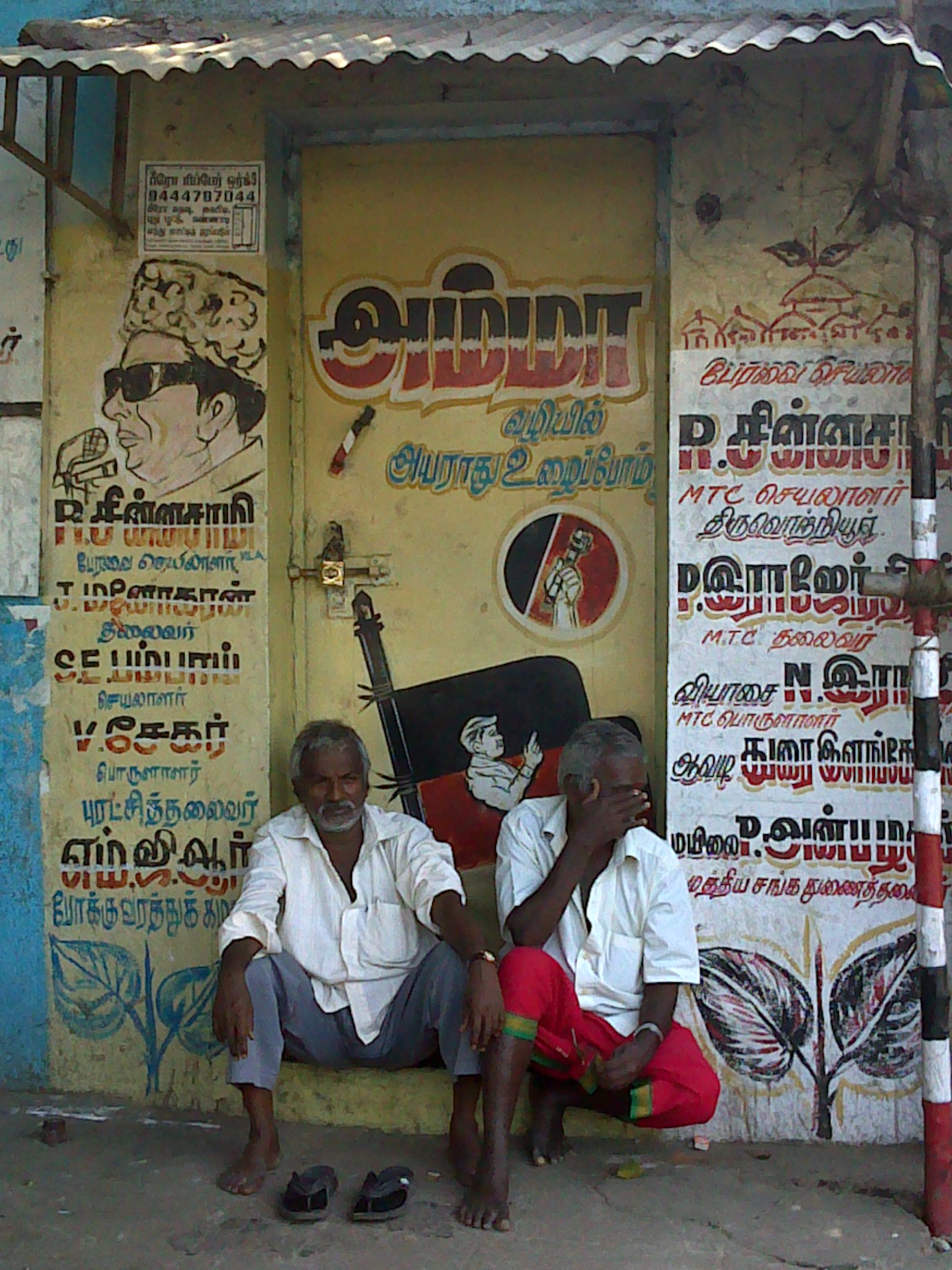
AIADMK supporters in Chennai before polling.

DMDK launched a vigorous campaign to defeat DMK; It made a resolution to call all parties to come together to defeat the ruling DMK in a conference held in Salem on 8 January presided over by its leader Vijayakanth. AIADMK general secretary Jayalalithaa campaigned supporting the candidates of her alliance across the entire state from 24 March until on 11 April. She promised to provide the people of Tamil Nadu with golden reign, if they voted out the ruling party. From the Tamil film industry, film directors R. V. Udayakumar and S. A. Chandrasekhar and actors Vijay, Senthil, Gundu Kalyanam, Ponnambalam, C. R. Saraswathi, Radha Ravi and Anandaraj campaigned for the AIADMK front. Communist Party of India (Marxist) general secretary Prakash Karat characterised the DMK's rule as a dark chapter in the history of Tamil Nadu and the 2G spectrum case had shamed its people. Communist Party of India general secretary A. B. Bardhan exhorted Jayalalithaa to lead the battle to unseat the corrupt regime at the centre after its victory in Tamil Nadu.

=== DMK front ===
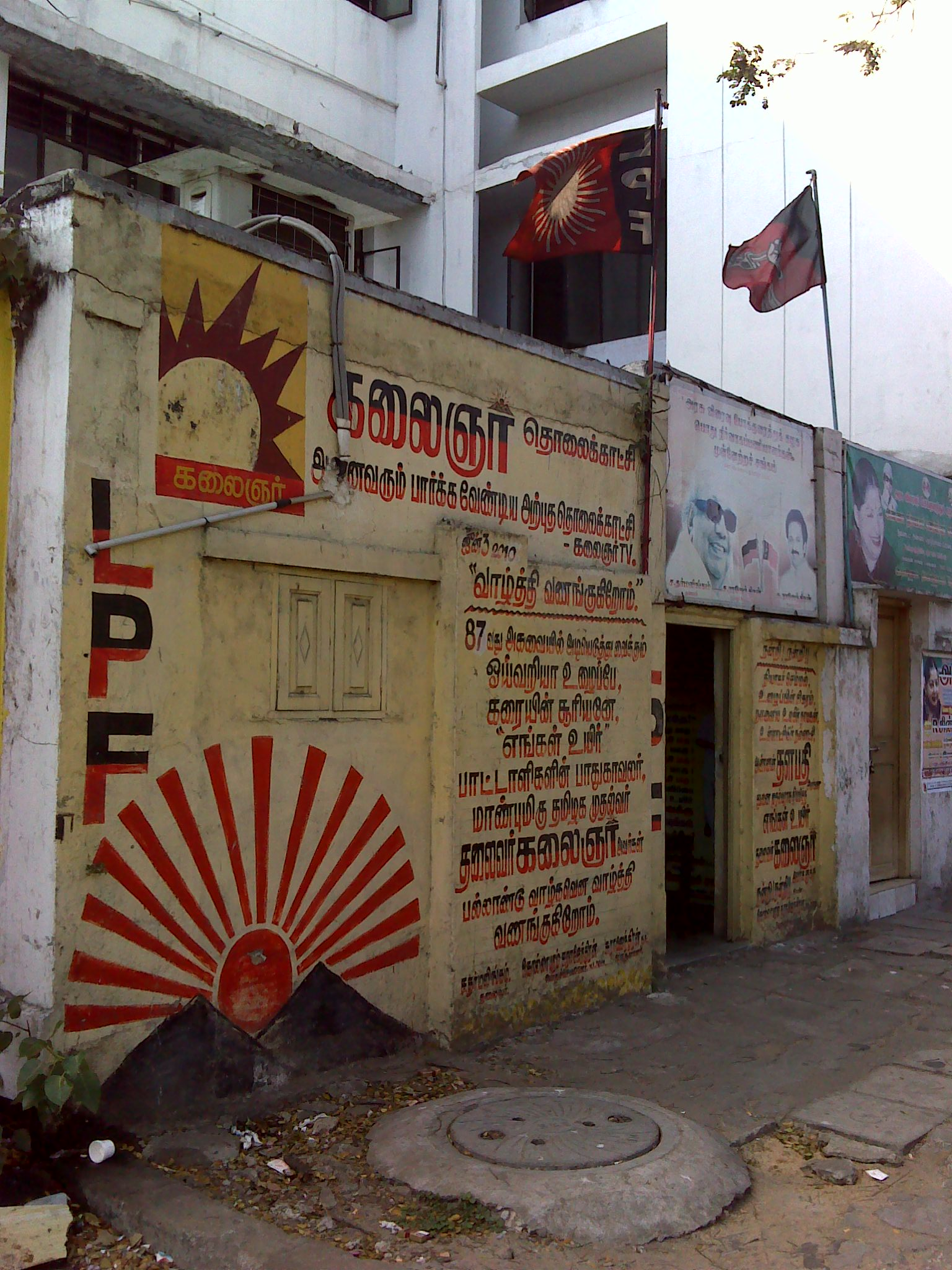
DMK posters in Chennai before polling.

S. Ramadoss, leader of Pattali Makkal Katchi expressed his dissatisfaction with people from film industry ruling Tamil Nadu since 1967. He also urged voters not to vote for Vijayakanth with long career as a Tamil actor. Expressing dissatisfaction that he could not be elected to Chief Ministership, Ramadoss complained – in a meeting held in Mayilam – that Vanniars with a total population of 25 million in Tamil Nadu never elected one of their own for Chief Minister of Tamil Nadu. Kongunadu Munnetra Kazhagam (KMK), a political party in the western districts of Tamil Nadu, complained about the neglect of Kongu region by the successive governments in a conference held at Karur. Er. Eswaran, general secretary of KMK, urged the government to focus more on infrastructure development in the Kongu region. Comedy actor Vadivelu campaigned for the DMK Front. Telugu actor and politician Chiranjeevi who had recently merged his party Praja Rajyam with Congress in Andhra Pradesh also campaigned for the DMK front. Actor turned Union Minister Napoleon, director K. Bhagyaraj, and actors Khushbu and Vaagai Chadrasekar campaigned for DMK . Congress President Sonia Gandhi shared the stage with Tamil Nadu Chief Minister M Karunanidhi in an election rally highlighting the strides made by the state under the latter's leadership. Addressing a rally near Marina beach in Chennai, Gandhi said Tamil Nadu had become a front-ranking state whose ideas of development and welfare were copied by the rest. All India Congress Committee general secretary Rahul Gandhi appealed to the people of Tamil Nadu to support the Democratic Progressive Alliance to further the development and socialistic agenda of the State for the next five years. Addressing an election rally which was presided over by Union Home Minister P. Chidambaram, he said that Tamil Nadu was one of the most progressive States in the country. It had achieved an important place in industrial, textile, automobile sectors and information technology; A number of social welfare schemes were being implemented. It was leading in health care and higher education in the country.

== Manifestoes ==
The manifestoes of the two largest in the legislative assembly were:

=== AIADMK ===
AIADMK general secretary J. Jayalalithaa released election manifesto for the election that mentioned it would give:

- 20 kg of free rice for ration-card holders.
- Laptops for students from classes XI.
- Free fans, mixers and grinders.
- Free mineral water to BPL families.
- Monorail for Chennai.
- Promised new power generation projects and IT Industries in Coimbatore West and development of Small Scale Industries in Madurai South.

=== DMK ===
DMK president M. Karunanidhi released election manifesto for the election that mentioned it would give:

- Free laptops for all college students and free mixer or grinder for women.
- Rural schemes and Metro Rail for Coimbatore and Madurai.

== Election Commission actions ==
The election commission was commended for conducting the election in a strict and fair manner. It enforced stringent measures to curb use of money power to bribe voters by paying them cash. It also strictly enforced 10 PM curfew on campaigning. DMK chief M Karunanidhi and his ally PMK founder S Ramadoss accused the EC of bringing about an emergency like situation in the State while such a situation was not prevalent in the other poll-bound States. CEC has said the people were happy about the conduct of elections, the CEC displayed an SMS from Chennai which read "earlier EC just announced elections. Only now they are conducting them. This is just one sample of people’s response". Some of the actions taken by Returning officers in the State

- The EC appointed flying squads and I–T teams recently seized more than Rs 50 million, largest ever in the state, from the roof of an empty bus in Trichy.
- The Election Commission is probing alleged purchase of nine lakh T-shirts costing more than Rs 110 million by ruling DMK from a single shop in Tirupur district of poll bound Tamil Nadu.
- Election Officials have seized unauthorised cash of over Rs 530 million in cash out of which Rs 420 million are from Tamil Nadu alone
- The biggest seizure of cash has come from Madurai district at Rs. 39.1 million. Madurai district collector U. Sahayam has said only Rs. 371,000 of the cash seized in the district has been reclaimed with documented proof. The EC had earlier transferred the collector and appointed Sahayam as the collector .EC also transferred the superintendent of police in Madurai district, key officials in the administration; it is also supervising the use of wedding halls to ensure that the premises are not misused.

=== Cases registered ===
- Tiruvarur town police have registered a case against film actor Vadivelu for his denigrating speech against founder of Desiya Murpokku Dravida Kazhagam (DMDK) Vijayakant on 23 March.
- Actress and DMK star speaker Khushboo has been booked under two cases for allegedly violating the Model Code of Conduct. The first case pertained to the actress allegedly blocking the road and interrupting traffic while campaigning for her party at Palanichetti area in the district, police said. The second case was booked when a combined eight cars were found to be following the vehicle of the actress without prior permission at two places in the district, police said. All the eight vehicles had been seized, they said.
- Melur Assistant Returning Officer, P. Kalimuthu had stated that DMK workers, accompanied by Mr. Alagiri, had been to the temple, where a large number of local elders were present. The flying squad had received information that the political party functionaries might distribute cash. They rushed to the spot and videographed the visit. This resulted in a scuffle. In the melee, the videographer [appointed by ECI] was roughed up. On the basis of Mr. Kalimuthu's complaint with Keelavalavu police, a case was registered against Mr. Alagiri, Deputy Mayor P.M. Mannan, two local DMK functionaries Regupathi and Thirugnanam and 50 others for waylaying and obstructing officials from discharging their duty.
- DMK Member of Parliament J.K. Ritheesh and seven others were arrested for allegedly assaulting a man and others when a clash broke out on Monday night between his supporters and a group over an issue of relaying a road near Ramanathapuram .
- Election Commission of India has sent notices, based on the complaint of the DMK to AIADMK general secretary Jayalalithaa and her ally DMDK general secretary Vijayakant for their alleged personal attacks against chief minister M. Karunanidhi and his family during electioneering.

== Opinion polls ==
=== Pre-poll surveys ===
Most non-partisan pre-polls found AIADMK+ winning comfortably in this election. The pre-polls indicated a great deal of anger towards the incumbent government, due to corruption allegations and recent food price rises. Also AIADMK was aided by including DMDK and its leader Vijaykanth, which has had on average a 10% vote share in recent elections in Tamil Nadu.

Agency	Dates	DMK+		AIADMK+		Ref.
Headlines Today–ORG Poll	1 April 2011	68 seats	45%	164 seats	50%	
"People studies" - Loyola College, Chennai	21–29 March 2011	70 seats	42%	105 seats	49%	
Junior Vikatan	6 April 2011	70 seats	–	100 seats	–	

=== Post-poll surveys ===
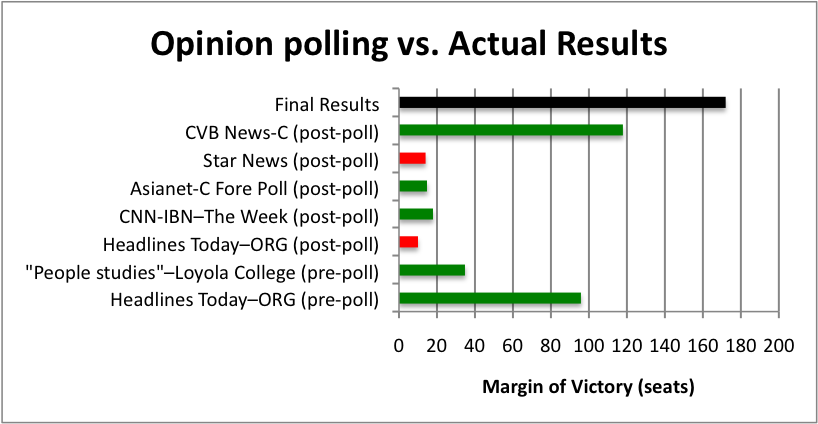
The above bar graph shows the differences in margin of victory (seats) between opinion polling and final results. Green represents the polling agency made the correct prediction (AIADMK+ victory/lead) Red represents the polling agency made the wrong prediction (DMK+ victory/lead)

Since exit polls are banned by ECI, Headlines Today-ORG Poll, conducted a post-poll survey, where they polled voters after they voted in their houses. Post polls conducted by Headlines Today-ORG Poll, found this election to be a toss-up, with DMK gaining a lot of ground in the last few weeks before the election. The exit poll particularly noted a late swing towards the incumbent in the rural communities of Tamil Nadu, which allowed the DMK and its alliance to increase its overall vote share percentage from 45% in the pre-poll survey to 50% post-poll. A couple of weeks after the Headlines today post poll, a few post polls showed the exact opposite result, with CNN-IBN and Asianet post poll giving AIADMK+, the majority of the same margin.

Seat and voteshare projections
Polling agency	Date published					Ref.
Polling agency	Date published	DMK+		AIADMK+		Ref.
Headlines Today–ORG Poll	28 April 2011	115-130	48%	105–120	47%	
CNN-IBN-The Week post-poll survey	10 May 2011	102–114	44%	120-132	46%	
Asianet-C Fore Poll	10 May 2011	117	–	132	–	
STAR News	10 May 2011	124	–	110	–	
CVB - NewsX-CVoter	10 May 2011	54–62	–	168-176	–	

== Polling ==
Source: Tamil Nadu Election Website

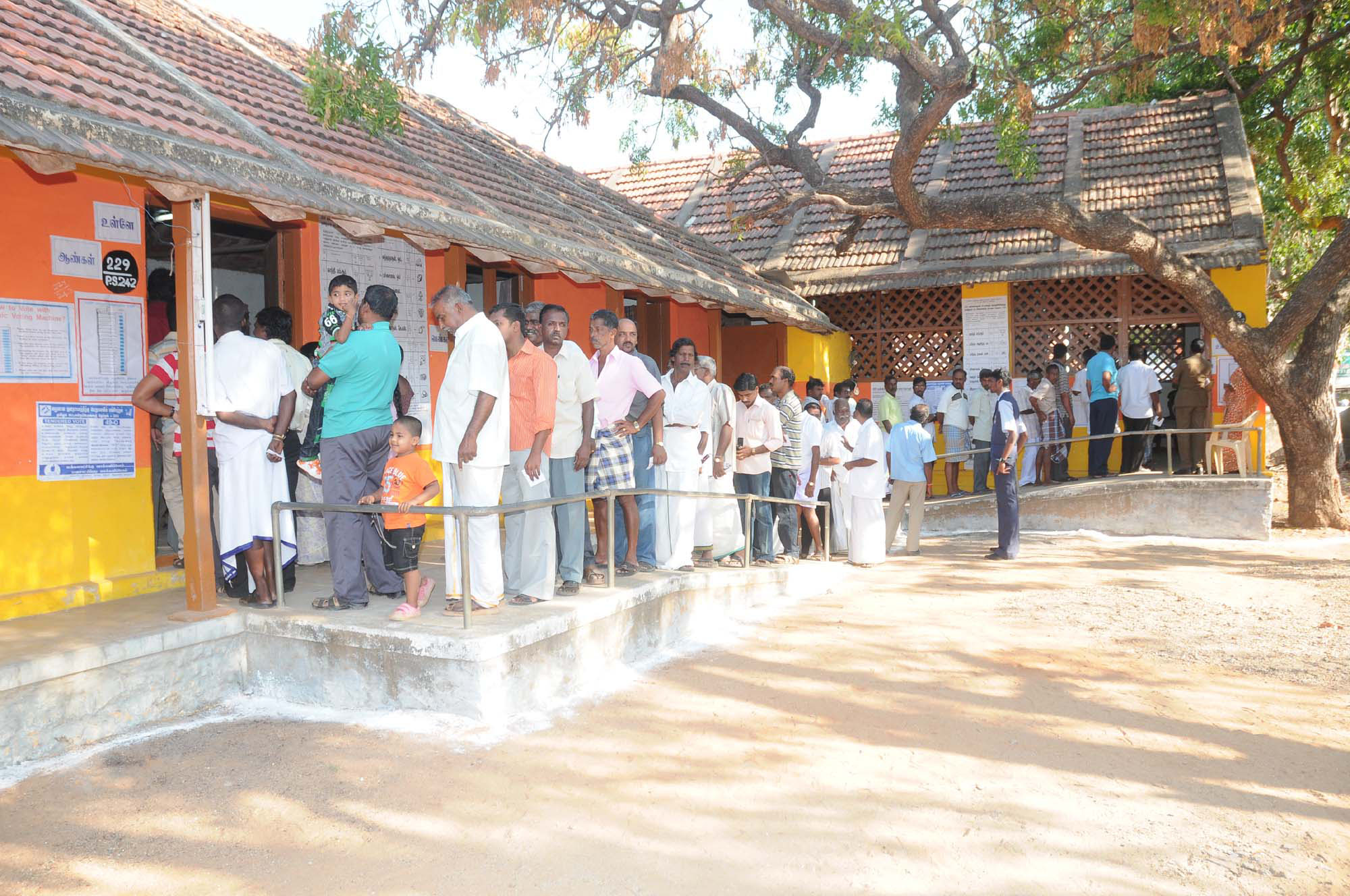
Voters in a long queue, waiting for their turn to exercise franchise rights during assembly election-2011, at a polling booth in Kanyakumari.

Poll notification was issued on 19 March. The last date of filing nominations was 26 March and candidates were allowed to withdraw their nominations until 30 March. The state election commission scrutinised the nominations on 28 March. Election was held in a single phase on 13 April 2011. 77.8% of the electorate voted in the election, the highest ever in the history of all elections conducted in Tamil Nadu surpassing 76.57% polled in 1967 election. Karur district registered highest turnout of 86.4% followed by Ariyalur district of 84.1%. Chennai district and Kanyakumari district polled the lowest number of votes, 68.2% and 69% respectively.

Category	Polled	Turnout %
Men	18,381,236	77.71%
Women	18,371,744	78.54%
Total	36,753,114	78.12%

== Result ==
=== Results by pre-poll alliance ===
Election map of results based on parties

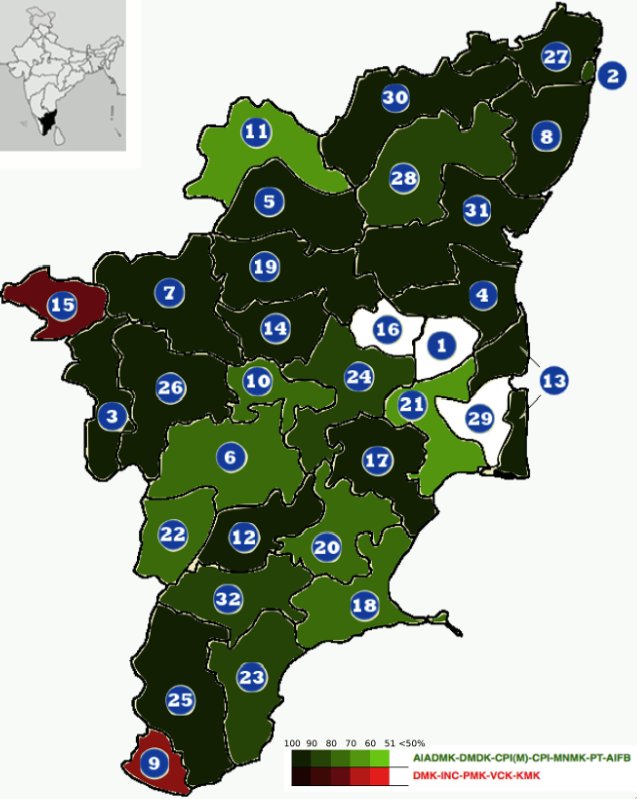
Election map based on % seats won by district

Summary of the 2011 April/May Assembly election result in Tamil Nadu
Alliance/Party	Seats won	Change	Popular vote	Vote %	Adj. %^{‡}
AIADMK+ alliance	203	+130	19,085,762	51.9%	
AIADMK	150	+93	14,150,289	38.4%	53.9%
DMDK	29	+28	2,903,828	7.9%	44.8%
CPI(M)	10	+1	888,364	2.4%	50.3%
CPI	9	+3	727,394	2.0%	48.6%
MNMK	2	+2	181,180	0.5%	42.4%
PT	2	+2	146,454	0.4%	54.3%
AIFB	1	+1	88,253	0.2%	51.2%
DMK+ alliance	31	-126	14,530,215	39.5%	
DMK	23	-77	8,249,991	22.4%	42.1%
INC	5	-32	3,426,432	9.3%	35.6%
PMK	3	-15	1,927,783	5.2%	39.6%
VCK	0	-2	555,965	1.5%	34.0%
KMK	0	–	370,044	1.0%	32.5%
Others	0	-4	3,137,137	8.5%	
BJP	0	–	819,577	2.2%	2.6%
MDMK^{†}	–	-3	–	–	–
IND and others	0	-1	2,120,476	5.8%	N/A
Total	234	–	36,845,373	100%	–
Valid votes			36,845,373	99.89	
Invalid votes			40,853	0.11	
Votes cast / turnout			36,886,226	78.29	
Abstentions			10,229,620	21.71	
Registered voters			47,115,846		

†: MDMK left the AIADMK alliance due to failed seat sharing talks and boycotted this election.
‡: Vote % reflects the percentage of votes the party received compared to the entire electorate that voted in this election. Adjusted (Adj.) Vote %, reflects the average % of votes the party received per constituency that they contested.
Sources: Election Commission of India and Hindu Newspaper

=== District Wise Performance ===
District	Seats		
District	Seats	ADK+	DPA
Thiruvallur	6	6	—N/a
Chennai	22	20	2
Kancheepuram	3	3	—N/a
Chengalpattu	6	6	—N/a
Ranipet	4	4	—N/a
Vellore	5	3	2
Tirupattur	4	4	—N/a
Krishnagiri	6	4	2
Dharmapuri	5	5	—N/a
Tiruvannamalai	8	7	1
Viluppuram	6	5	1
Kallakurichi	5	5	—N/a
Salem	11	11	—N/a
Namakkal	6	6	—N/a
Erode	8	8	—N/a
Tiruppur	8	8	—N/a
Nilgiris	3	1	2
Coimbatore	10	10	—N/a
Dindigul	7	5	2
Karur	4	3	1
Tiruchirappalli	9	8	1
Perambalur	2	1	1
Ariyalur	2	1	1
Cuddalore	9	9	—N/a
Mayiladuthurai	3	3	—N/a
Nagapattinam	3	3	—N/a
Thiruvarur	4	2	2
Thanjavur	8	5	3
Pudukkottai	6	6	—N/a
Sivaganga	4	3	1
Madurai	10	10	—N/a
Theni	4	3	1
Virudhunagar	7	6	1
Ramanathapuram	4	3	1
Thoothukudi	6	5	1
Tenkasi	5	5	—N/a
Tirunelveli	5	4	1
Kanniyakumari	6	2	4
Total	234	203	31

== Detailed Results ==
Constituency		Winner				Runner Up				Margin	%
#	Name	Candidate	Party	Votes	%	Candidate	Party	Votes	%	Margin	%
1	Gummidipoondi	C. H. Sekar	DMDK	97,708	54.40	K. N. Sekar	PMK	68,452	38.11	29,256	16.29
2	Ponneri (SC)	Pon. Raja	ADMK	93,624	57.50	A. Manimekalai	DMK	62,354	38.29	31,270	19.21
3	Tiruttani	M. Arun Subramanian	DMDK	95,918	50.16	E. S. S. Raman	INC	71,988	37.64	23,930	12.52
4	Thiruvallur	B. V. Ramanaa	ADMK	91,337	53.69	E. A. P. Sivaji	DMK	67,689	39.79	23,648	13.90
5	Poonamallee (SC)	R. Manimaran	ADMK	99,097	54.59	Kanchi Mathiazhagan	INC	57,678	31.77	41,419	22.82
6	Avadi	S. Abdul Rahim	ADMK	110,102	55.18	R. Dhamotharan	INC	66,864	33.51	43,238	21.67
7	Maduravoyal	G. Beem Rao	CPM	96,844	52.09	K. Selvam	PMK	72,833	39.17	24,011	12.92
8	Ambattur	S. Vedachalam	ADMK	99,330	53.30	B. Ranaganathan	DMK	76,613	41.11	22,717	12.19
9	Madavaram	V. Moorthy	ADMK	115,468	55.69	N. S. Kanimozhi	DMK	80,703	38.93	34,765	16.76
10	Thiruvottiyur	K. Kuppan	ADMK	93,944	57.03	K. P. P. Samy	DMK	66,653	40.47	27,291	16.56
11	R. K. Nagar	P. Vetrivel	ADMK	83,777	59.04	P. K. Sekar Babu	DMK	52,522	37.01	31,255	22.03
12	Perambur	A. Soundararajan	CPM	84,668	52.26	N. R. Dhanapalan	DMK	67,245	41.50	17,423	10.76
13	Kolathur	M. K. Stalin	DMK	68,677	48.35	Saidai Duraisamy	ADMK	65,943	46.43	2,734	1.92
14	Villivakkam	J. C. D. Prabhakar	ADMK	68,612	52.44	K. Anbazhagan	DMK	57,830	44.20	10,782	8.24
15	Thiru-Vi-Ka-Nagar (SC)	V. Neelakandan	ADMK	72,887	58.87	Dr. C. Natesan	INC	43,546	35.17	29,341	23.70
16	Egmore (SC)	K. Nalla Thambi	DMDK	51,772	46.23	Parithi Ilamvazhuthi	DMK	51,570	46.05	202	0.18
17	Royapuram	D. Jayakumar	ADMK	65,099	57.89	R. Manohar	INC	43,727	38.88	21,372	19.01
18	Harbour	Pala. Karuppiah	ADMK	53,920	55.89	Altaf Hussain	DMK	33,603	34.83	20,317	21.06
19	Chepauk-Thiruvallikeni	J. Anbazhagan	DMK	64,191	49.44	Thamimum Ansari	MNMK	54,988	42.35	9,203	7.09
20	Thousand Lights	B. Valarmathi	ADMK	67,522	50.55	Hasan Md. Jinnah	DMK	59,930	44.87	7,592	5.68
21	Anna Nagar	S. Gokula Indira	ADMK	88,954	58.67	V. K. Arivazhagan	INC	52,364	34.54	36,590	24.13
22	Virugampakkam	B. Parthasarathy	DMDK	71,524	49.65	K. Thanasekaran	DMK	57,430	39.86	14,094	9.79
23	Saidapet	G. Senthamizhan	ADMK	79,856	51.78	M. Magesh Kumaar	DMK	67,785	43.95	12,071	7.83
24	Thiyagarayanagar	V. P. Kalairajan	ADMK	75,883	58.48	A. Chellakumar	INC	43,421	33.46	32,462	25.02
25	Mylapore	R. Rajalakshmi	ADMK	80,063	56.03	K. V. Thangkabalu	INC	50,859	35.60	29,204	20.43
26	Velachery	M. K. Ashok	ADMK	82,145	53.91	M. Jayaraman	PMK	50,425	33.10	31,720	20.81
27	Sholinganallur	K. P. Kandan	ADMK	145,385	60.43	S. S. Balaji	VCK	78,413	32.59	66,972	27.84
28	Alandur	S. Ramachandran	DMDK	76,537	45.52	K. Ghayathri Devi	INC	70,783	42.10	5,754	3.42
29	Sriperumbudur (SC)	R. Perumal	ADMK	101,751	59.07	D. Yasodha	INC	60,819	35.31	40,932	23.76
30	Pallavaram	P. Dhansingh	ADMK	105,631	52.70	T. M. Anbarasan	DMK	88,257	44.03	17,374	8.67
31	Tambaram	T. K. M. Chinnayya	ADMK	91,702	51.45	S. R. Raja	DMK	77,718	43.61	13,984	7.84
32	Chengalpattu	D. Murugesan	DMDK	83,297	44.58	V. G. Rangasamy	PMK	83,006	44.42	291	0.16
33	Thiruporur	K. Manoharan	ADMK	84,169	53.06	K. Arumugam	PMK	65,881	41.53	18,288	11.53
34	Cheyyur (SC)	V. S. Raji	ADMK	78,307	55.59	D. Parventhan	VCK	51,723	36.72	26,584	18.87
35	Madurantakam (SC)	S. Kanitha Sampath	ADMK	79,256	53.64	K. Jayakumar	INC	60,762	41.13	18,494	12.51
36	Uthiramerur	P. Ganesan	ADMK	86,912	51.75	Ponkumar	DMK	73,146	43.55	13,766	8.20
37	Kancheepuram	V. Somasundaram	ADMK	102,710	53.43	P. S. Ulagarakshagan	PMK	76,993	40.05	25,717	13.38
38	Arakkonam (SC)	S. Ravi	ADMK	79,409	55.94	S. Sellapandian	VCK	53,172	37.46	26,237	18.48
39	Sholingur	P. R. Manogar	DMDK	69,963	38.98	A. M. Muniratinam	IND	60,925	33.94	9,038	5.04
40	Katpadi	Durai Murugan	DMK	75,064	49.55	S. R. K. Appu	ADMK	72,091	47.59	2,973	1.96
41	Ranipet	A. Mohammedjan	ADMK	83,834	53.14	R. Gandhi	DMK	69,633	44.14	14,201	9.00
42	Arcot	R. Srinivasan	ADMK	93,258	53.11	K. L. Elavazagan	PMK	74,005	42.14	19,253	10.97
43	Vellore	V. S. Vijay	ADMK	71,522	50.82	C. Gnanasekharan	INC	56,346	40.04	15,176	10.78
44	Anaikattu	M. Kalai Arasu	PMK	80,233	54.51	V. B. Velu	DMDK	52,330	35.55	27,903	18.96
45	Kilvaithinankuppam (SC)	C. K. Thamizharasan	ADMK	72,002	51.12	K. Seetharaman	DMK	62,242	44.19	9,760	6.93
46	Gudiyattam (SC)	K. Lingamuthu	CPI	79,416	49.07	K. Rajamarthandan	DMK	73,574	45.46	5,842	3.61
47	Vaniyambadi	Govi. Sampath Kumar	ADMK	80,563	54.65	H. Abdul Basith	DMK	62,338	42.29	18,225	12.36
48	Ambur	A. Aslam Basha	MNMK	60,361	44.01	J. Vijay Elanchezian	INC	55,270	40.30	5,091	3.71
49	Jolarpet	K. C. Veeramani	ADMK	86,273	55.13	G. Ponnusamy	PMK	63,337	40.47	22,936	14.66
50	Tirupattur	K. G. Ramesh	ADMK	82,895	55.31	S. Rajendran	DMK	61,103	40.77	21,792	14.54
51	Uthangarai (SC)	Manoranjitham Nagaraj	ADMK	90,381	58.92	Muniyammal	VCK	51,223	33.39	39,158	25.53
52	Bargur	K. E. Krishnamoorthi	ADMK	88,711	56.02	T. K. Raja	PMK	59,271	37.43	29,440	18.59
53	Krishnagiri	K. P. Munusamy	ADMK	89,776	55.98	Syed Ghiyas Ul Haq	INC	60,679	37.83	29,097	18.15
54	Veppanahalli	T. Senguttuvan	DMK	71,471	45.09	S. M. Kandan	DMDK	63,867	40.29	7,604	4.80
55	Hosur	K. Gopinath	INC	65,034	37.79	S. John Timothy	DMDK	50,882	29.56	14,152	8.23
56	Thalli	T. Ramachandran	CPI	74,353	47.90	Y. Prakaash	DMK	67,918	43.75	6,435	4.15
57	Palacodu	K. P. Anbalagan	ADMK	94,877	60.72	V. Selvam	PMK	51,664	33.06	43,213	27.66
58	Pennagaram	N. Nanjappan	CPI	80,028	49.31	P. N. P. Inbasekaran	DMK	68,485	42.20	11,543	7.11
59	Dharmapuri	A. Baskar	DMDK	76,943	45.73	P. Santhamoorthy	PMK	72,900	43.33	4,043	2.40
60	Pappireddippatti	P. Palaniappan	ADMK	76,582	45.39	V. Mullaivendhan	DMK	66,093	39.17	10,489	6.22
61	Harur (SC)	P. Dillibabu	CPM	77,703	51.71	B. M. Nandhan	VCK	51,200	34.07	26,503	17.64
62	Chengam (SC)	T. Suresh	DMDK	83,722	46.95	K. Selvaperunthagai	INC	72,225	40.50	11,497	6.45
63	Tiruvannamalai	E. V. Velu	DMK	84,802	49.40	S. Ramachandran	ADMK	79,676	46.41	5,126	2.99
64	Kilpennathur	A. K. Aranganathan	ADMK	83,663	48.20	K. Pitchandi	DMK	79,582	45.85	4,081	2.35
65	Kalasapakkam	Agri S. S. Krishnamurthy	ADMK	91,833	58.95	P. S. Vijayakumar	INC	53,599	34.40	38,234	24.55
66	Polur	L. Jaya Sudha	ADMK	92,391	55.42	G. Edirolimanian	PMK	63,846	38.30	28,545	17.12
67	Arani	R. M. Babu Murugavel	DMDK	88,967	50.06	R. Sivanandham	DMK	81,001	45.58	7,966	4.48
68	Cheyyar	N. Subramanian	ADMK	96,180	53.67	M. K. Vishnu Prasad	INC	70,717	39.46	25,463	14.21
69	Vandavasi (SC)	V. Gunaseelan	ADMK	84,529	52.05	J. Kamalakkannan	DMK	72,233	44.48	12,296	7.57
70	Gingee	A. Ganeshkumar	PMK	77,026	44.15	R. Sivalingam	DMDK	75,215	43.12	1,811	1.03
71	Mailam	K. P. Nagarajan	ADMK	81,656	53.92	R. Prakash	PMK	61,575	40.66	20,081	13.26
72	Tindivanam (SC)	D. Haridoss	ADMK	80,553	52.59	M. P. Sankar	PMK	65,016	42.45	15,537	10.14
73	Vanur (SC)	I. Janagiraman	ADMK	88,834	55.99	S. Pushparaj	DMK	63,696	40.14	25,138	15.85
74	Villupuram	C. V. Shanmugam	ADMK	90,304	52.18	K. Ponmudy	DMK	78,207	45.19	12,097	6.99
75	Vikravandi	R. Ramamurthy	CPM	78,656	51.72	K. Rathamani	DMK	63,759	41.93	14,897	9.79
76	Tirukkoyilur	L. Venkatesan	DMDK	78,229	49.18	M. Thangam	DMK	69,438	43.65	8,791	5.53
77	Ulundurpettai	R. Kumaraguru	ADMK	114,794	60.09	M. Mohamed Yousuf	VCK	61,286	32.08	53,508	28.01
78	Rishivandiyam	Vijayakanth	DMDK	91,164	53.19	S. Sivaraj	INC	60,369	35.22	30,795	17.97
79	Sankarapuram	P. Mohan	ADMK	87,522	51.24	T. Udhayasuriyan	DMK	75,324	44.09	12,198	7.15
80	Kallakurichi (SC)	K. Alaguvelu	ADMK	111,249	62.18	A. C. Pavarasu	VCK	51,251	28.65	59,998	33.53
81	Gangavalli (SC)	R. Subha	DMDK	72,922	48.60	K. Chinnadurai	DMK	59,457	39.63	13,465	8.97
82	Attur (SC)	S. Madheswaran	ADMK	88,036	55.53	S. K. Arthanari	INC	58,180	36.70	29,856	18.83
83	Yercaud (ST)	C. Perumal	ADMK	104,221	58.06	C. Tamilselvan	DMK	66,639	37.13	37,582	20.93
84	Omalur	C. Krishnan	ADMK	112,102	59.70	A. Tamizharasu	PMK	65,558	34.91	46,544	24.79
85	Mettur	S. R. Parthiban	DMDK	75,672	44.62	G. K. Mani	PMK	73,078	43.09	2,594	1.53
86	Edappadi	Edappadi K. Palaniswami	ADMK	104,586	56.38	M. Karthe	PMK	69,848	37.66	34,738	18.72
87	Sankari	P. Vijayalakshmi	ADMK	105,502	57.07	Veerapandy S. Arumugam	DMK	70,423	38.10	35,079	18.97
88	Salem (West)	G. Venkatachalam	ADMK	95,935	56.50	R. Rajendran	DMK	68,274	40.21	27,661	16.29
89	Salem (North)	Alagaapuram R. Mohanraj	DMDK	88,956	54.46	G. Jayaprakash	INC	59,591	36.48	29,365	17.98
90	Salem (South)	M. K. Selvaraju	ADMK	112,691	64.97	S. R. Sivalingam	DMK	52,476	30.25	60,215	34.72
91	Veerapandi	S. K. Selvam	ADMK	100,155	55.73	A. Rajendran	DMK	73,657	40.98	26,498	14.75
92	Rasipuram (SC)	P. Dhanapal	ADMK	90,186	55.60	V. P. Duraisamy	DMK	65,469	40.36	24,717	15.24
93	Senthamangalam (ST)	R. Santhi	DMDK	76,637	47.51	K. Ponnusamy	DMK	68,132	42.24	8,505	5.27
94	Namakkal	K. P. P. Baskar	ADMK	95,579	56.34	R. Devarasan	KNMK	59,724	35.20	35,855	21.14
95	Paramathi-Velur	U. Thaniyarasu	ADMK	82,682	54.50	C. Vadivel	PMK	51,664	34.06	31,018	20.44
96	Tiruchengodu	P. Sampath Kumar	DMDK	78,103	52.12	M. R. Sundaram	INC	54,158	36.14	23,945	15.98
97	Kumarapalayam	P. Thangamani	ADMK	91,077	56.59	G. Selvaraju	DMK	64,190	39.88	26,887	16.71
98	Erode (East)	V. C. Chandhirakumar	DMDK	69,166	50.83	S. Muthusamy	DMK	58,522	43.01	10,644	7.82
99	Erode (West)	K. V. Ramalingam	ADMK	90,789	59.29	M. Yuvaraja	INC	52,921	34.56	37,868	24.73
100	Modakkurichi	R. N. Kittusamy	ADMK	87,705	57.29	R. M. Palanisami	INC	47,543	31.06	40,162	26.23
101	Dharapuram (SC)	K. Ponnusamy	ADMK	83,856	51.68	R. Jayanthi	DMK	68,831	42.42	15,025	9.26
102	Kangayam	N. S. N. Nataraj	ADMK	96,005	60.63	S. Videyal Sekar	INC	54,240	34.26	41,765	26.37
103	Perundurai	N. D. Venkatachalam	ADMK	89,960	60.15	K. K. C. Balu	KNMK	47,793	31.96	42,167	28.19
104	Bhavani	P. G. Narayanan	ADMK	87,121	54.28	K. S. Mahendran	PMK	59,080	36.81	28,041	17.47
105	Anthiyur	S. S. Ramanitharan	ADMK	78,496	54.92	N. K. K. P. Raja	DMK	53,242	37.25	25,254	17.67
106	Gobichettipalayam	K. A. Sengottaiyan	ADMK	94,872	54.47	N. S. Sivaraj	KNMK	52,960	30.40	41,912	24.07
107	Bhavanisagar (SC)	P. L. Sundaram	CPI	82,890	50.69	R. Logeswari	DMK	63,487	38.83	19,403	11.86
108	Udhagamandalam	Budhichandhiran	ADMK	61,605	50.22	R. Ganesh	INC	54,060	44.07	7,545	6.15
109	Gudalur (SC)	M. Thiravidamani	DMK	66,871	58.67	S. Selvaraj	DMDK	39,497	34.65	27,374	24.02
110	Coonoor	K. Ramachandran	DMK	61,302	50.66	A. Bellie	CPI	52,010	42.98	9,292	7.68
111	Mettuppalayam	O. K. Chinnaraj	ADMK	93,700	54.53	B. Arunkumar	DMK	67,925	39.53	25,775	15.00
112	Avanashi (SC)	A. A. Karuppasamy	ADMK	103,002	66.60	A. R. Natarajan	INC	41,591	26.89	61,411	39.71
113	Tiruppur (North)	M. S. M. Anandan	ADMK	113,640	70.62	C. Govindasamy	DMK	40,369	25.09	73,271	45.53
114	Tiruppur (South)	K. Thangavel	CPM	75,424	61.63	K. Senthilkumar	INC	37,121	30.33	38,303	31.30
115	Palladam	K. P. Paramasivam	ADMK	118,140	66.78	K. Balasubramanian	KNMK	48,364	27.34	69,776	39.44
116	Sulur	K. Thinakaran	DMDK	88,680	52.29	E. R. Eswaran	KNMK	59,148	34.88	29,532	17.41
117	Kavundampalayam	V. C. Arukutty	ADMK	137,058	63.22	T. P. Subramanian	DMK	67,798	31.27	69,260	31.95
118	Coimbatore (North)	T. Malaravan	ADMK	93,276	60.07	M. Veeragopal	DMK	53,178	34.25	40,098	25.82
119	Thondamuthur	S. P. Velumani	ADMK	99,886	62.40	M. N. Kandaswamy	INC	46,683	29.16	53,203	33.24
120	Coimbatore (South)	R. Doraisamy	ADMK	80,637	56.27	Pongalur N. Palanisamy	DMK	52,841	36.88	27,796	19.39
121	Singanallur	R. Chinnaswamy	ADMK	89,487	56.32	Mayura S. Jayakumar	INC	55,161	34.71	34,326	21.61
122	Kinathukadavu	S. Damodaran	ADMK	94,123	56.17	M. Kannappan	DMK	63,857	38.11	30,266	18.06
123	Pollachi	M. K. Muthukaruppannasamy	ADMK	81,446	57.46	K. Nithyanandhan	KNMK	51,138	36.08	30,308	21.38
124	Valparai (SC)	M. Arumugham	CPI	61,171	49.16	N. Kovaithangam	INC	57,750	46.41	3,421	2.75
125	Udumalaipettai	Pollachi Jayaraman V	ADMK	95,477	60.87	T. Ilamparithi	KNMK	50,917	32.46	44,560	28.41
126	Madathukulam	C. Shanmugavelu	ADMK	78,622	54.71	M. P. Saminathan	DMK	58,953	41.02	19,669	13.69
127	Palani	K. S. N. Venugopalu	ADMK	82,051	48.30	I. P. Senthil Kumar	DMK	80,297	47.27	1,754	1.03
128	Oddanchatram	R. Sakkarapani	DMK	87,743	51.99	P. Baalasubramani	ADMK	72,810	43.14	14,933	8.85
129	Athoor	I. Periyasamy	DMK	112,751	59.58	S. Balasubramani	DMDK	58,819	31.08	53,932	28.50
130	Nilakkottai (SC)	A. Ramasamy	PT	75,124	52.45	K. Rajangam	INC	50,410	35.19	24,714	17.26
131	Natham	Natham R. Viswanathan	ADMK	94,947	53.87	K. Vijayan	DMK	41,858	23.75	53,089	30.12
132	Dindigul	K. Balabharathi	CPM	86,932	58.82	J. Paul Baskar	PMK	47,817	32.35	39,115	26.47
133	Vedasandur	S. Palanichamy	ADMK	104,511	61.92	M. Dhandapani	INC	53,799	31.88	50,712	30.04
134	Aravakurichi	K. C. Pallanishamy	DMK	72,831	49.71	V. Senthilnathan	ADMK	68,290	46.61	4,541	3.10
135	Karur	V. Senthil Balaji	ADMK	99,738	61.18	Jothimani	INC	55,593	34.10	44,145	27.08
136	Krishnarayapuram (SC)	S. Kamaraj	ADMK	83,145	54.81	P. Kamaraj	DMK	60,636	39.97	22,509	14.84
137	Kulithalai	A. Pappa Sundaram	ADMK	87,459	54.78	R. Manickam	DMK	64,986	40.70	22,473	14.08
138	Manapparai	R. Chandrasekar	ADMK	81,020	46.77	K. Ponnusamy	IND	52,721	30.43	28,299	16.34
139	Srirangam	J. Jayalalithaa	ADMK	105,328	58.99	N. Anand	DMK	63,480	35.55	41,848	23.44
140	Tiruchirappalli (West)	M. Mariam Pichai	ADMK	77,492	50.21	K. N. Nehru	DMK	70,313	45.56	7,179	4.65
141	Tiruchirappalli (East)	R. Manoharan	ADMK	83,046	54.84	Anbil Periyasamy	DMK	62,420	41.22	20,626	13.62
142	Thiruverumbur	S. Senthilkumar	DMDK	71,356	47.40	K. N. Seharan	DMK	67,151	44.61	4,205	2.79
143	Lalgudi	A. Soundara Pandian	DMK	65,363	44.71	A. D. Sendhureswaran	DMDK	58,208	39.81	7,155	4.90
144	Manachanallur	T. P. Poonatchi	ADMK	83,105	53.12	N. Selvaraj	DMK	63,915	40.86	19,190	12.26
145	Musiri	N. R. Sivapathi	ADMK	82,631	54.79	M. Rajasekharan	INC	38,840	25.75	43,791	29.04
146	Thuraiyur (SC)	T. Indragandhi	ADMK	75,228	50.67	S. Parimala Devi	DMK	64,293	43.31	10,935	7.36
147	Perambalur (SC)	R. Thamizhselvan	ADMK	98,497	52.19	M. Prabhakaran	DMK	79,418	42.08	19,079	10.11
148	Kunnam	S. S. Sivasankar	DMK	81,723	46.89	Durai Kamaraj	DMDK	58,766	33.72	22,957	13.17
149	Ariyalur	Durai Manivel	ADMK	88,726	47.77	D. Amaramoorthy	INC	70,906	38.17	17,820	9.60
150	Jayankondam	J. Guru	PMK	92,739	51.53	P. Elavazhagan	ADMK	77,601	43.12	15,138	8.41
151	Tittakudi (SC)	K. Tamil Azhagan	DMDK	61,897	44.45	M. Sinthanaiselvan	VCK	49,255	35.37	12,642	9.08
152	Vriddhachalam	V. Muthukumar	DMDK	72,902	46.06	T. Neethirajan	INC	59,261	37.44	13,641	8.62
153	Neyveli	M. P. S. Sivasubramaniyan	ADMK	69,549	50.63	T. Velmurugan	PMK	61,431	44.72	8,118	5.91
154	Panruti	P. Sivakozhundu	DMDK	82,187	50.91	Saba Rajendran	DMK	71,471	44.27	10,716	6.64
155	Cuddalore	M. C. Sampath	ADMK	85,953	60.56	E. Pugazhendi	DMK	52,275	36.83	33,678	23.73
156	Kurinjipadi	R. Rajendran	ADMK	88,345	56.38	M. R. K. Panneerselvam	DMK	64,497	41.16	23,848	15.22
157	Bhuvanagiri	R. Selvi	ADMK	87,413	51.34	T. Arivuselvan	PMK	74,296	43.64	13,117	7.70
158	Chidambaram	K. Balakrishnan	CPM	72,054	48.30	Sridhar Vandaiyar	DMK	69,175	46.37	2,879	1.93
159	Kattumannarkoil (SC)	N. Murugumaran	ADMK	83,665	57.79	D. Ravikumar	VCK	51,940	35.88	31,725	21.91
160	Sirkazhi (SC)	M. Sakthi	ADMK	83,881	54.62	P. Durairajan	VCK	56,502	36.79	27,379	17.83
161	Mayiladuthurai	R. Arulselvan	DMDK	63,326	44.64	S. Rajakumar	INC	60,309	42.52	3,017	2.12
162	Poompuhar	S. Pavunraj	ADMK	85,839	50.66	K. Agoram	PMK	74,466	43.94	11,373	6.72
163	Nagapattinam	K. A. Jayapal	ADMK	61,870	51.26	Mohamed Sheik Dawood	DMK	56,127	46.51	5,743	4.75
164	Kilvelur (SC)	P. Mahalingam	CPM	59,402	48.99	U. Mathivanan	DMK	58,678	48.39	724	0.60
165	Vedaranyam	N. V. Kamaraj	ADMK	53,799	41.16	S. K. Vedarathinam	IND	42,871	32.80	10,928	8.36
166	Thiruthuraipoondi (SC)	K. Ulaganathan	CPI	83,399	53.36	P. Selvadurai	INC	61,112	39.10	22,287	14.26
167	Mannargudi	T. R. B. Rajaa	DMK	81,320	48.93	Rajamanickam Siva	ADMK	77,338	46.54	3,982	2.39
168	Thiruvarur	M. Karunanidhi	DMK	109,014	62.96	M. Rajendran	ADMK	58,765	33.94	50,249	29.02
169	Nannilam	R. Kamaraj	ADMK	92,071	50.96	R. Elangovan	DMK	81,667	45.20	10,404	5.76
170	Thiruvidaimarudur (SC)	Govi. Chezhian	DMK	77,175	48.12	T. Pandiyarajan	ADMK	76,781	47.87	394	0.25
171	Kumbakonam	G. Anbalagan	DMK	78,642	48.72	Rama Ramanathan	ADMK	77,370	47.93	1,272	0.79
172	Papanasam	R. Doraikkannu	ADMK	85,635	53.47	M. Ramkumar	INC	67,628	42.22	18,007	11.25
173	Thiruvaiyaru	M. Rethinasami	ADMK	88,784	51.11	S. Aranganathan	DMK	75,822	43.65	12,962	7.46
174	Thanjavur	M. Rengasamy	ADMK	75,415	50.57	S. N. M. Ubayadullah	DMK	68,086	45.66	7,329	4.91
175	Orathanadu	R. Vaithilingam	ADMK	91,724	57.80	T. Mahesh Krishnasamy	DMK	59,080	37.23	32,644	20.57
176	Pattukkottai	N. R. Rengarajan	INC	55,482	37.91	N. Senthilkumar	DMDK	46,703	31.91	8,779	6.00
177	Peravurani	Arun Pandian	DMDK	51,010	36.42	K. Mahendran	INC	43,816	31.29	7,194	5.13
178	Gandharvakottai (SC)	N. Subramanian	ADMK	67,128	54.85	S. Kavithaipithan	DMK	47,429	38.76	19,699	16.09
179	Viralimalai	C. Vijayabaskar	ADMK	77,285	55.99	S. Regupathy	DMK	37,976	27.51	39,309	28.48
180	Pudukkottai	S. P. Muthukumaran	CPI	65,466	46.78	Periyannan Arassu	DMK	62,365	44.56	3,101	2.22
181	Thirumayam	P. K. Vairamuthu	ADMK	78,913	58.27	R. M. Subburam	INC	47,778	35.28	31,135	22.99
182	Alangudi	Ku. Pa. Krishnan	ADMK	57,250	41.42	S. Arulmani	PMK	52,123	37.71	5,127	3.71
183	Aranthangi	M. Rajanayagam	ADMK	67,559	52.77	Su. Thirunavukkarasar	INC	50,903	39.76	16,656	13.01
184	Karaikudi	Cholan C. T. Palanichamy	ADMK	86,104	51.01	Ramasamy KR	INC	67,204	39.81	18,900	11.20
185	Tiruppattur	K. R. Periyakaruppan	DMK	83,485	48.25	Raja Kannappan	ADMK	81,901	47.34	1,584	0.91
186	Sivaganga	Gunasekaran S	CPI	75,176	47.82	V. Rajasekaran	INC	70,794	45.03	4,382	2.79
187	Manamadurai (SC)	M. Gunasekaran	ADMK	83,535	51.68	A. Tamilarasi	DMK	69,515	43.01	14,020	8.67
188	Melur	Melur R. Samy	ADMK	85,869	55.74	R. Rani	DMK	61,407	39.86	24,462	15.88
189	Madurai East	K. Tamilarasan	ADMK	99,447	55.29	P. Moorthy	DMK	70,692	39.30	28,755	15.99
190	Sholavandan (SC)	M. V. Karuppiah	ADMK	86,376	59.84	M. Ilanseliyan	PMK	49,768	34.48	36,608	25.36
191	Madurai North	A. K. Bose	ADMK	90,706	63.62	K. S. K. Rajendran	INC	44,306	31.08	46,400	32.54
192	Madurai South	R. Annadurai	CPM	83,441	61.59	S. P. Varadharajan	INC	37,990	28.04	45,451	33.55
193	Madurai Central	R. Sundarrajan	DMDK	76,063	52.77	Syed Ghouse Basha	DMK	56,502	39.20	19,560	13.57
194	Madurai West	Sellur K. Raju	ADMK	94,798	59.64	G. Thalapathi	DMK	56,037	35.25	38,761	24.39
195	Thiruparankundram	A. K. T. Raja	DMDK	95,469	58.70	C. R. Sundararajan	INC	46,967	28.88	48,502	29.82
196	Thirumangalam	M. Muthuramalingam	ADMK	101,494	55.55	M. Manimaran	DMK	75,127	41.12	26,367	14.43
197	Usilampatti	P. V. Kathiravan	AIFB	88,253	51.22	S. O. Ramasamy	DMK	72,933	42.33	15,320	8.89
198	Andipatti	Thanga Tamil Selvan	ADMK	91,721	53.75	L. Mookiah	DMK	70,690	41.42	21,031	12.33
199	Periyakulam (SC)	A. Laser	CPM	76,687	47.86	V. Anbazhagan	DMK	71,046	44.34	5,641	3.52
200	Bodinayakanur	O. Panneerselvam	ADMK	95,235	56.69	S. Lakshmanan	DMK	65,329	38.89	29,906	17.80
201	Cumbum	N. Eramakrishnan	DMK	80,307	48.58	P. Murugesan	DMDK	68,139	41.22	12,168	7.36
202	Rajapalayam	K. Gopalsamy	ADMK	80,125	53.80	S. Thanga Pandian	DMK	58,693	39.41	21,432	14.39
203	Srivilliputhur (SC)	V. Ponnupandi	CPI	73,485	47.79	R. V. K. Durai	DMK	67,257	43.74	6,228	4.05
204	Sattur	R. B. Udhayakumar	ADMK	88,918	58.32	A. Kadarkarairaj	DMK	59,573	39.07	29,345	19.25
205	Sivakasi	K. T. Rajenthra Bhalaji	ADMK	87,333	59.17	T. Vanaraja	DMK	51,679	35.01	35,654	24.16
206	Virudhunagar	K. Pandiarajan	DMDK	70,441	52.36	T. Armstrong Naveen	INC	49,003	36.42	21,438	15.94
207	Aruppukkottai	Vaigaichelvan	ADMK	76,546	51.15	Ramachandran	DMK	65,908	44.05	10,638	7.10
208	Tiruchuli	Thangam Thennarasu	DMK	81,613	54.36	Esakki Muthu	ADMK	61,661	41.07	19,952	13.29
209	Paramakudi (SC)	S. Sundararaj	ADMK	86,150	57.88	R. Ramprabhu	INC	51,544	34.63	34,606	23.25
210	Tiruvadanai	Suba Thangavelan	DMK	64,165	41.11	S. Mujupur Rahman	DMDK	63,238	40.52	927	0.59
211	Ramanathapuram	M. H. Jawahirullah	MNMK	65,831	40.96	K. Hussan Ali	INC	50,074	31.16	15,757	9.80
212	Mudhukulathur	M. Murugan	ADMK	83,225	46.87	V. Sathiamoorthy	DMK	63,136	35.56	20,089	11.31
213	Vilathikulam	G. V. Markandayan	ADMK	72,753	54.58	K. Perumalsamy	INC	50,156	37.63	22,597	16.95
214	Thoothukkudi	S. T. Chellapandian	ADMK	89,010	56.78	P. Geetha Jeevan	DMK	62,817	40.07	26,193	16.71
215	Tiruchendur	Anitha R. Radhakrishnan	DMK	68,741	47.04	P. R. Manoharan	ADMK	68,101	46.60	640	0.44
216	Srivaikuntam	S. P. Shunmuganathan	ADMK	69,708	52.86	M. B. Sudalaiyandi	INC	48,586	36.84	21,122	16.02
217	Ottapidaram (SC)	K. Krishnasamy	PT	71,330	56.41	S. Raja	DMK	46,204	36.54	25,126	19.87
218	Kovilpatti	Kadambur Raju	ADMK	73,007	55.85	G. Ramachandran	PMK	46,527	35.59	26,480	20.26
219	Sankarankovil (SC)	C. Karuppasamy	ADMK	72,297	49.99	M. Umamaheswari	DMK	61,902	42.80	10,395	7.19
220	Vasudevanallur (SC)	S. Duraiappa	ADMK	80,633	56.77	S. Ganesan	INC	52,543	37.00	28,090	19.77
221	Kadayanallur	P. Chendur Pandian	ADMK	80,794	49.83	S. Peter Alphonse	INC	64,708	39.91	16,086	9.92
222	Tenkasi	R. Sarathkumar	ADMK	92,253	54.30	Karuppasamy Pandian	DMK	69,286	40.78	22,967	13.52
223	Alangulam	P. G. Rajendran	ADMK	78,098	47.29	Poongothai Aladi Aruna	DMK	77,799	47.11	299	0.18
224	Tirunelveli	Nainar Nagendran	ADMK	86,220	54.81	A. L. S. Lakshmanan	DMK	47,729	30.34	38,491	24.47
225	Ambasamudram	E. Subaya	ADMK	80,156	55.11	R. Avudaiyappan	DMK	55,547	38.19	24,609	16.92
226	Palayamkottai	T. P. M. Mohideen Khan	DMK	58,049	42.76	V. Palani	CPM	57,444	42.31	605	0.45
227	Nanguneri	A. Narayanan	ADMK	65,510	45.91	H. Vasanthakumar	INC	53,230	37.31	12,280	8.60
228	Radhapuram	S. Michael Rayappan	DMDK	67,072	48.36	P. Veldurai	INC	45,597	32.88	21,475	15.48
229	Kanniyakumari	K. T. Pachaimal	ADMK	86,903	48.22	N. Suresh Rajan	DMK	69,099	38.34	17,804	9.88
230	Nagercoil	A. Nanjil Murugesan	ADMK	58,819	40.01	R. Mahesh	DMK	52,092	35.43	6,727	4.58
231	Colachal	J. G. Prince	INC	58,428	40.16	P. Larence	ADMK	46,607	32.03	11,821	8.13
232	Padmanabhapuram	Pushpa Leela Alban	DMK	59,882	41.48	S. Austin	DMDK	40,561	28.10	19,321	13.38
233	Vilavancode	S. Vijayadharani	INC	62,898	43.69	R. Leema Rose	CPM	39,109	27.17	23,789	16.52
234	Killiyoor	S. John Jacob	INC	56,932	41.69	T. Chandra Kumar	BJP	32,446	23.76	24,486	17.93

=== Reactions ===
M. Karunanidhi submitted his resignation to Governor Surjit Singh Barnala, thus paving way for Jayalalithaa to swear-in on 16 May. After the election, Jayalalithaa thanked her supporters and said "this is not a victory for me, but a victory for the state and the country". She further stated that she wants to "rebuild the state, from the havoc created by the previous government" and insisted that she does not plan to share power with her allies. DMDK leader, Vijaykanth, after being the second largest party in the new assembly and an important ally of AIADMK, stated that this is a "victory for the people and an end to family rule". TDP leader and former Chief Minister of Andhra Pradesh, Chandrababu Naidu, called and congratulated Jayalalithaa on her "victory over corruption". After the loss, Congress leader Jayanthi Natarajan, conceded defeat and wished the best for incoming CM, Jayalalithaa. While she admitted that 2G spectrum case played a huge role in their defeat, she further re-iterated that they have done everything they can to be transparent and that action has been taken against individuals responsible for the corruption. Union Minister, P. Chidambaram admitted that this was a huge loss for Congress in Tamil Nadu but does not believe this will affect the UPA government at the center, because this was a loss of an alliance led by DMK and not INC. M. Karunanidhi after the loss stated, "People have given me proper rest" and went on to congratulate the people of the state (on the election outcome).

== Analysis ==
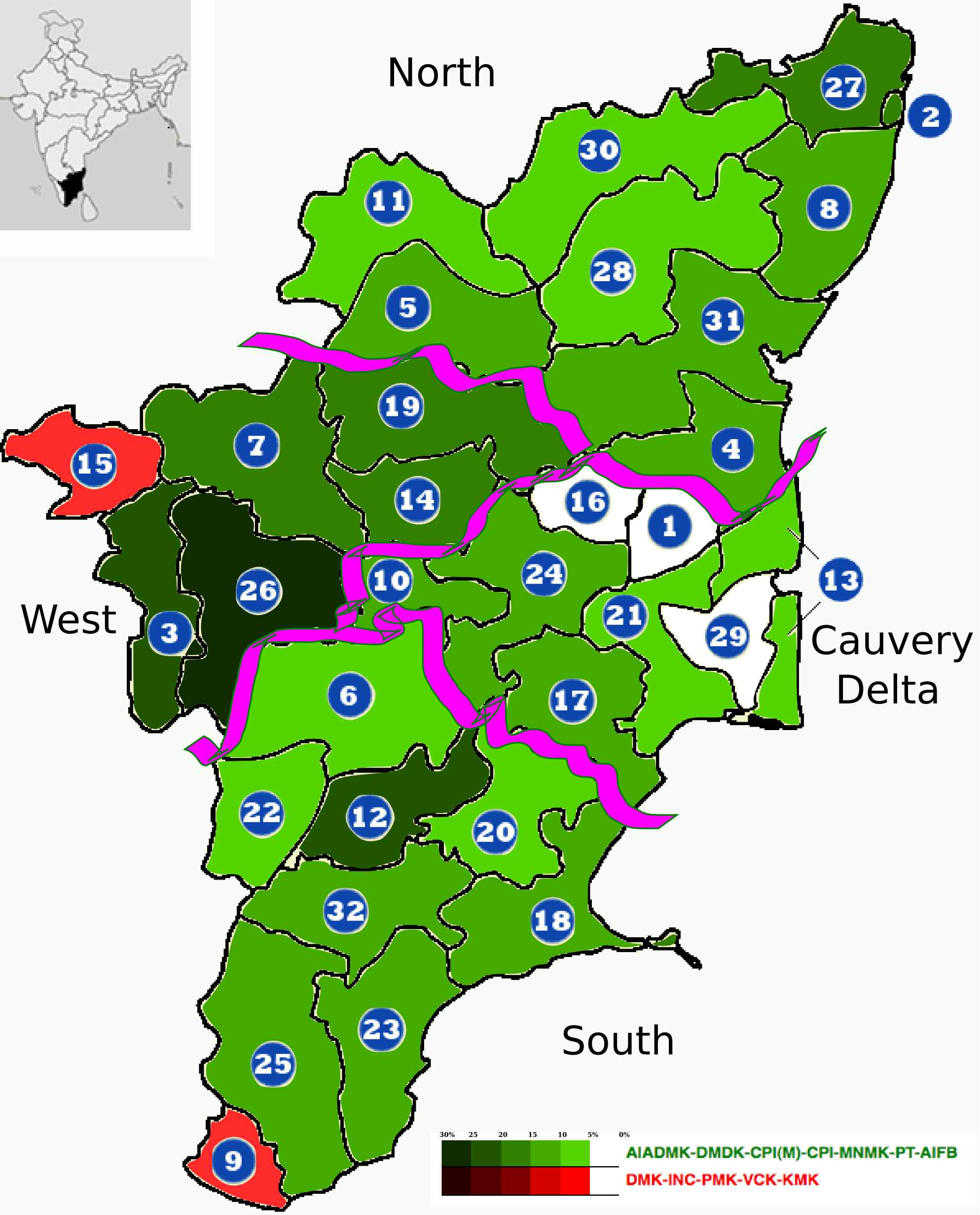
Election map based on Vote % margin difference between AIADMK+ candidates and DMK+ candidates by district. The % margin for each color are as follows: 30%-25%; 25%-20%; 20%-15%; 15%-10%; 10%-5%; 5%-0%

Pre-polls and post-polls released before the counting showed a mixed picture and a close race and failed to predict the landslide victory for the AIADMK alliance. Including this election, no incumbent party has ever won a re-election in Tamil Nadu since M.G.R's victory in 1984 election. The results were consistent with the anti-incumbency factor that is common in Tamil Nadu politics. Closer look at the results show that AIADMK swept through the state winning by big margins. AIADMK and its allies won all the seats in 12 out of the 32 districts, with margins greater than 10% over its rival DMK and its allies. Out of those 12 districts, AIADMK+ won by margins greater than 15% in seven of them. In Chennai District, which once used to be a DMK bastion, AIADMK+ won 14 out of 16 constituencies with a margin of 13.1% over DMK+. In northern Tamil Nadu which is considered to be DMK's traditional bastion, DMK and its allies just won 4 out of 62 constituencies. DMK members blamed that the alliance with caste based Pattali Makkal Katchi and Viduthalai Chiruthaigal Katchi didn't go well with other castes and caused their downfall. Analysts felt that the strife between Vanniyars and Dalits could have played a role in DMK+ debacle in northern region. AIADMK's best district was the newly created Tiruppur, where they beat the DMK and its allies by a margin of 29.4%. This is consistent with the continued support for AIADMK in this region, since the former Coimbatore district was AIADMK's best performance in 2006 election. AIADMK+, did extremely well in its traditional stronghold in western Tamil Nadu. DMK, weak in this region, relied on its ally, Kongunadu Munnetra Kazhagam, who had a disappointing performance in this region losing by margins greater than 20% to AIADMK+. The western region was already affected with major issues like power cuts, agricultural crisis and industrial pollution and the DMK members after the election admitted that family rule could be one of the reasons for their downfall. DMK leaders after the election blamed the alienation of Dalits and other castes by KNMK due to the fact it is viewed as a party of Gounders. DMK+, on the hand, only did better than its opponent in four districts: Nilgiris, Kanniyakumari, Thiruvarur and Perambalur, all traditional DMK strongholds. The only region, DMK+ was able to be competitive is in the Cauvery delta region, which has long been a DMK stronghold. DMK's best district was Nilgiris, which includes A. Raja's former MP constituency. DMK+ did poorly in the Madurai district, where they found a lot of success in recent years (2006 by-election & 2009 LS election), due to Azhagiri's vigorous campaigning. They were not able to win a single seat in this district, and lost by a margin of 20.9% to AIADMK-CPI(M)-DMDK combine.

Post-poll data released by CNN-IBN, showed that DMK+ did the worst amongst the poor, especially in rural areas. Major issue cited by them as a reason for voting against the DMK is supply of electricity. Before the election, DMK was hoping that freebies and welfare schemes implemented by their administration would help them gain support from rural voters, who were an important electorate for the DMK to grab power in the previous election. This failed to take place, since many rural voters were unhappy with the distribution of these freebies in a disproportionate manner and lack of policies targeting towards income generation schemes in rural areas. This coupled with the recent food price rises resulted in a decline in rural support for the DMK. While spiraling prices, power cut, and DMK's family politics were important factors, many analysts agree that it was the corruption charges (2G spectrum scandal), that eventually led them to their ultimate defeat. This election saw one of the worst performance of Congress in Tamil Nadu, winning only 5 seats out of 63 seats it contested. During the campaign, they were marred with in-fighting between state Congress leader K.V. Thangkabalu and other Congress members, which added to their declining support in the state. In both Tamil Nadu and Pondicherry, Congress did poorly reflecting widespread anger and disapproval.

== Statistics ==
=== Strike Rate ===
Strike rate is determined by calculating the number of seats won by a party of the number of seats it contested.

Alliance/ Party		Seats contested	Seats Won	Strike Rate
AIADMK+	AIADMK	165	150	90.90%
AIADMK+	DMDK	41	29	70.73%
AIADMK+	CPI(M)	12	10	83.33%
AIADMK+	CPI	10	9	90%
AIADMK+	MMK	3	2	66.66%
AIADMK+	PT	2	2	100%
AIADMK+	AIFB	1	1	100%
AIADMK+	Total	234	203	86.75%
DPA	DMK	124	23	18.54%
DPA	INC	63	5	7.93%
DPA	PMK	30	3	10%
DPA	Total	234	31	13.24%

=== Vote Percentage ===
Vote % Range of Winning Candidate	No. of MLAs
35% – 40%	4
40% – 45%	17
45% – 50%	45
50% – 55%	85
55% – 60%	62
60% – 65%	18
65% – 70%	2
70% – 75%	1
Total MLAs	234

- Highest Winning Vote Share: 70.62% achieved by M. S. M. Anandan (AIADMK) in the Tiruppur (North) constituency.
- Lowest Winning Vote Share: 36.42% by Arun Pandian (DMDK) in Peravurani.
- Concentration of Victories: The vast majority of winning candidates—147 out of 234 MLAs (62.8%)—secured their seats with a vote share between 50% and 60%.

== Government formation ==
J. Jayalalithaa was sworn in as the chief minister of Tamil Nadu for the fourth time on 16 May 2011. She submitted her unanimous election as the general secretary of the AIADMK legislature party to the governor of Tamil Nadu Surjit Singh Barnala on 15 May 2011. She was sworn in along with 33 other ministers at the Madras University centenary auditorium on 16 May 2011 by the governor, at the same venue where she took the oath in 1991 when she first became chief minister. She and all the other ministers took oaths in Tamil. The ceremony was attended by chief minister of Gujarat Narendra Modi, former chief minister of Andhra Pradesh Nara Chandrababu Naidu, and general secretary of the Communist Party of India A. B. Bardhan, among others.

== Bypolls (2011–2016) ==
S.No	Date	Constituency	MLA before election	Party before election	Elected MLA	Party after election
140	13 October 2011	Tiruchirappalli West	M. Mariam Pichai	All India Anna Dravida Munnetra Kazhagam	M. Paranjothi	All India Anna Dravida Munnetra Kazhagam
219	18 March 2012	Sankarankoil	C. Karuppasamy	All India Anna Dravida Munnetra Kazhagam	V. M. Rajalakshmi	All India Anna Dravida Munnetra Kazhagam
180	12 June 2012	Pudukkottai	S. P. Muthukumaran	Communist Party of India	V. R. Karthik Thondaiman	All India Anna Dravida Munnetra Kazhagam
83	23 February 2013	Yercaud	C. Perumal	All India Anna Dravida Munnetra Kazhagam	P. Saroja	All India Anna Dravida Munnetra Kazhagam
28	24 April 2014	Alandur	Panruti Ramachandran	Desiya Murpokku Dravida Kazhagam	V. N. P. Venkatraman	All India Anna Dravida Munnetra Kazhagam
139	13 February 2015	Srirangam	J. Jayalalithaa	All India Anna Dravida Munnetra Kazhagam	S. Valarmathi	All India Anna Dravida Munnetra Kazhagam
11	27 June 2015	Radhakrishnan Nagar	P. Vetriivel	All India Anna Dravida Munnetra Kazhagam	J. Jayalalithaa	All India Anna Dravida Munnetra Kazhagam
