= D. Moorthy =

Indian politician

Member-Tamil Nadu Legislative Assembly
- In office 2006–2011
- Preceded by: S. Kanitha Sampath
- Succeeded by: K. Manoharan
- Constituency: Thiruporur

Personal details
- Born: 10 March 1966 Peramanallur
- Party: Pattali Makkal Katchi
- Relations: Dhuruvan (Father)
- Profession: Business

Dhuruvan Moorthy is an Indian politician and a former member of the Tamil Nadu Legislative Assembly. He hails from Maraimalai Nagar in Chengalpattu district. Moorthy, who completed a diploma in Civil Engineering at Central Polytechnic College, Chennai, belongs to the Pattali Makkal Katchi (PMK) party. He contested and won the Tiruporur assembly constituency in the 2006 Tamil Nadu Legislative Assembly election, becoming a Member of the Legislative Assembly (MLA).

== Electoral performance ==
=== 2006 ===
2006 Tamil Nadu Legislative Assembly election: Thiruporur
Party	Candidate	Votes	%	±%
PMK	D. Moorthy	73,328	45.07%	
AIADMK	M. Dhanapal	63,164	38.82%	−15.82%
DMDK	Kannappan. K	19,227	11.82%	
BJP	Ponvaratharajan. M	1,979	1.22%	
BSP	Srinivasan. M	1,177	0.72%	
CPI(ML)L	Eraniappan. C	955	0.59%	−0.61%
Independent	Jagadeesan. V	926	0.57%	
Margin of victory		10,164	6.25%	−11.88%
Turnout		1,62,708	65.62%	7.54%
Registered electors		2,47,954		
PMK gain from AIADMK		Swing	-9.57%	
