= S. S. Balaji =

Indian politician

Member of the Tamil Nadu Legislative Assembly
- In office 12 May 2021 – 2026
- Speaker: M. Appavu
- Preceded by: L. Idhayavarman
- Succeeded by: B. Vijayaraj
- Constituency: Thiruporur

Personal details
- Born: 24 September 1970 (age 55)
- Party: Viduthalai Chiruthaigal Katchi
- Spouse: Dr. Sharmila
- Children: 1
- Education: B.E., L.L.B
- Alma mater: Sri Venkateswara University
- Website: http://ssbalajii.blogspot.com/

S. S. Balaji (born 24 September 1970) is an Indian politician and lawyer from the Viduthalai Chiruthaigal Katchi (VCK). He was serving as Member of the Tamil Nadu Legislative Assembly from Thiruporur constituency from May 2021 to 2026.

== Education ==
He got his Bachelor of Engineering (BE) degree in 1991. Later, in 2015, he obtained Bachelor of Laws (LLB) from Sri Venkateswara University (Tirupati, Andhra Pradesh).

== Electoral performance ==
2021 Tamil Nadu Legislative Assembly election: Thiruporur
Party	Candidate	Votes	%	±%
VCK	S. S. Balaji	93,954	41.80%	
PMK	K. Arumugam	92,007	40.94%	
NTK	S. Mohana Sundari	20,428	9.09%	8.18%
MNM	Lavanya. N	8,194	3.65%	
AMMK	Kothandapani. M	7,662	3.41%	
NOTA	Nota	1,982	0.88%	−0.17%
BSP	V. K. Pakkiri Ambadkar	1,135	0.51%	0.36%
Margin of victory		1,947	0.87%	0.39%
Turnout		2,24,747	76.28%	−2.81%
Rejected ballots		101	0.04%	
Registered electors		2,94,620		
VCK gain from DMK		Swing	6.90%	

2011 Tamil Nadu Legislative Assembly election: Shozhinganallur
Party	Candidate	Votes	%	±%
AIADMK	K. P. Kandan	145,385	60.43	New
VCK	S. S. Balaji	78,413	32.59	New
BJP	S. Mohandoss Gandhi	7,275	3.02	New
BSP	K. Utharapathi	1,983	0.82	New
IJK	K. Singaraj	1,666	0.69	New
Independent	K. Narasimhan	1,648	0.69	New
Margin of victory		66,972	27.84	
Turnout		240,583	67.27	
Registered electors		357,660		
AIADMK win (new seat)				
