= Thiruporur (disambiguation) =

Thiruporur is a panchayat town in Chengalpattu district, Tamil Nadu, India.

Thiruporur may also refer to:

- Tirupporur (state assembly constituency)
- Thiruporur taluk

== See also ==
- Thiruporur Kandaswamy temple
