= Sholinganallur Assembly constituency =

State Legislative Assembly Constituency in Tamil Nadu

Sholinganallur
- Constituency No. 27 for the Tamil Nadu Legislative Assembly

Constituency details
- Country: India
- Region: South India
- State: Tamil Nadu
- District: Chengalpattu
- Lok Sabha constituency: Chennai South
- Established: 2008
- Total electors: 5,53,978

Member of Legislative Assembly
- 17th Tamil Nadu Legislative Assembly
- Incumbent P. Saravanan
- Party: TVK
- Elected year: 2026

Sholinganallur is a state assembly constituency in Chengalpattu district of Tamil Nadu, India, that was formed after constituency delimitations in 2008. Its State Assembly Constituency number is 27. It is a part of Chennai South Lok Sabha constituency for national elections. It is one of the 234 State Legislative Assembly Constituencies in Tamil Nadu.

== Members of Legislative Assembly ==
Year	Winner	Party
2011	K. P. Kandan	All India Anna Dravida Munnetra Kazhagam
2016	S. Aravind Ramesh	Dravida Munnetra Kazhagam
2021	S. Aravind Ramesh	Dravida Munnetra Kazhagam
2026	P. Saravanan	Tamilaga Vettri Kazhagam

== Election results ==
Vote share of winning candidates
2026	49.27%
2021	44.18%
2016	42.53%
2011	60.43%

=== 2026 ===
2026 Tamil Nadu Legislative Assembly election: Sholinganallur
Party	Candidate	Votes	%	±%
TVK	ECR P. Saravanan	220,382	49.27	New
DMK	S. Aravind Ramesh	1,23,602	27.63	▼16.55
AIADMK	K. P. Kandan	74,112	16.57	▼18.49
NTK	R. Jayalakshmi	21,919	4.90	▼5.11
NOTA	NOTA	2,079	0.46	▼0.32
Margin of victory		96,780	21.64	▲12.52
Turnout		4,47,295	80.74	▲25.17
Registered electors		5,53,978		▼1,44,842
TVK gain from DMK		Swing	▲49.27	

=== 2021 ===
2021 Tamil Nadu Legislative Assembly election: Shozhinganallur
Party	Candidate	Votes	%	±%
DMK	S. Aravind Ramesh	171,558	44.18	+1.65
AIADMK	K. P. Kandan	136,153	35.06	−3.15
NTK	S. Michael	38,872	10.01	+6.87
MNM	Rajiv Kumar	30,284	7.80	New
DMDK	R. Murugan	3,912	1.01	New
NOTA	NOTA	3,030	0.78	−1.34
Margin of victory		35,405	9.12	4.80
Turnout		388,355	55.57	−1.81
Rejected ballots		552	0.14	
Registered electors		698,820		
DMK hold		Swing	1.65	

=== 2016 ===
2016 Tamil Nadu Legislative Assembly election: Shozhinganallur
Party	Candidate	Votes	%	±%
DMK	S. Aravind Ramesh	147,014	42.53	New
AIADMK	N. Sundaram	132,101	38.21	−22.22
PMK	K. Ramkumar	15,595	4.51	New
VCK	R. Paneer Doss	15,129	4.38	New
BJP	Ujagar Singh	14,915	4.31	+1.29
NTK	S. Rajan	10,842	3.14	New
NOTA	NOTA	7,332	2.12	New
Margin of victory		14,913	4.31	−23.52
Turnout		345,697	57.38	−9.89
Registered electors		602,472		
DMK gain from AIADMK		Swing	-17.90	

=== 2011 ===
2011 Tamil Nadu Legislative Assembly election: Shozhinganallur
Party	Candidate	Votes	%	±%
AIADMK	K. P. Kandan	145,385	60.43	New
VCK	S. S. Balaji	78,413	32.59	New
BJP	S. Mohandoss Gandhi	7,275	3.02	New
BSP	K. Utharapathi	1,983	0.82	New
IJK	K. Singaraj	1,666	0.69	New
Independent	K. Narasimhan	1,648	0.69	New
Margin of victory		66,972	27.84	
Turnout		240,583	67.27	
Registered electors		357,660		
AIADMK win (new seat)				
