= 2025 Rajya Sabha elections =

Elections for the upper house of Indian Parliament

- June – October 2025

14 (Note: Including two casual vacancies.) of the 233 (Note: excluding 12 nominated seats.) elected seats in the Rajya Sabha 123 (Note: out of 244 (excluding one vacancy and including 12 nominated seats.)) total seats needed for a majority
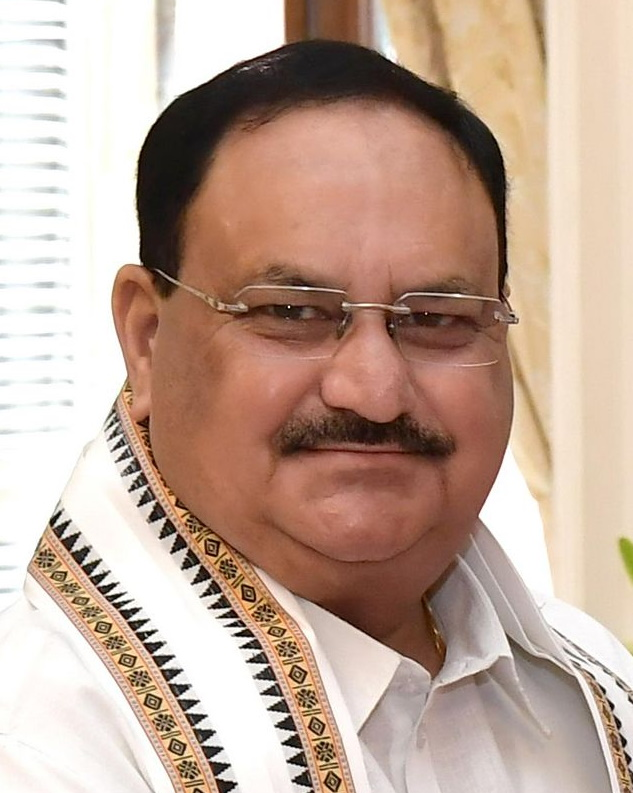

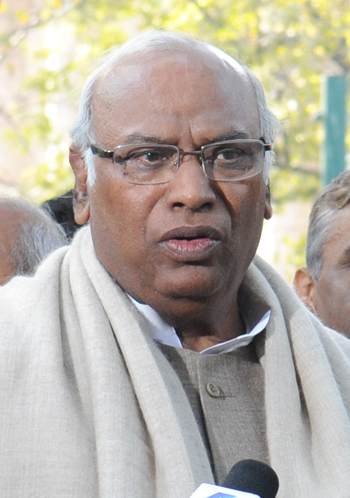
| | First party | Second party |
|---|---|---|
| Leader | J. P. Nadda | Mallikarjun Kharge |
| Party | BJP | INC |
| Alliance | NDA | INDIA |
| Leader since | 24 June 2024 | 16 February 2021 |
| Seats before | 96 (Note: excluding two nominated members.) | 27 |
| Seats after | 98 (Note: excluding 5 nominated members.) | 27 |
| Seat change | ▲2 | Steady |
| Alliance seats before | 119 (Note: excluding 8 nominated members.) | 77 |
| Alliance seats after | 121 (Note: excluding 12 nominated members.) | 80 |
| Seat change | ▲2 | ▲3 |
Majority before election
National Democratic Alliance (Note: including the support of 8 nominated members.)
Majority after election
National Democratic Alliance (Note: including the support of 12 nominated members.)

The 2025 Rajya Sabha elections were held as part of a routine six-year cycle of the upper house of the Parliament of India from 19 June to 24 October 2025 to elect 14 of its 245 members (including 2 by-elections), of which the states through their legislators elect 233, and the remaining 12 are appointed by the President.

The ruling National Democratic Alliance retained its majority in the house.

== Electoral system ==
MPs are elected through indirect election by the members of the State legislative assemblies using the system of proportional representation by means of the single transferable vote. Each voter (MLA) ranks candidates in the order of preference (marking 1, 2, 3 and so on) under an open ballot system. Candidate have to reach a specific quota of votes in order to win a seat.

$\text{Quota} = \left( \frac{\text{Total valid votes}}{\text{Vacancies} + 1} \right) + 1$

For a single-seat election, each ballot is valued at one. When multiple seats are filled, the ballot value is set to one hundred.

A candidate is elected unopposed when the number of candidates matches the number of available seats after nominations and withdrawals period.

== Results ==
| Alliance/ Party | | Seats | +/– |
|---|---|---|---|
| NDA | Bharatiya Janata Party | 3 | +2 |
| NDA | All India Anna Dravida Munnetra Kazhagam | 2 | +1 |
| NDA | Asom Gana Parishad | 1 | 0 |
| NDA | Total | 6 | +3 |
| INDIA | Dravida Munnetra Kazhagam | 3 | 0 |
| INDIA | Jammu & Kashmir National Conference | 3 | +3 |
| INDIA | Makkal Needhi Maiam | 1 | +1 |
| INDIA | Marumalarchi Dravida Munnetra Kazhagam | 0 | -1 |
| INDIA | Total | 7 | +3 |
| Others | Aam Aadmi Party | 1 | 0 |
| Others | Yuvajana Sramika Rythu Congress Party | 0 | -1 |

== Members retiring and elected ==
=== June election ===
==== Assam ====
| # | Previous MP | | Term end | Elected MP | Party | Term start |
|---|---|---|---|---|---|---|
| 1 | Mission Ranjan Das | BJP | 14-Jun-2025 | Kanad Purkayastha | BJP | 15-Jun-2025 |
| 2 | Birendra Prasad Baishya | AGP | 14-Jun-2025 | Birendra Prasad Baishya | AGP | 15-Jun-2025 |

==== Tamil Nadu ====
| # | Previous MP | Previous Party | Term end | Elected MP | Party | Term start |
|---|---|---|---|---|---|---|
| 1 | N. Chandrasegharan | AIADMK | 24 July 2025 | M. Dhanapal | AIADMK | 25 July 2025 |
| 2 | Anbumani Ramadoss | PMK | 24 July 2025 | I. S. Inbadurai | AIADMK | 25 July 2025 |
| 3 | M. M. Abdulla | DMK | 24 July 2025 | Salma | DMK | 25 July 2025 |
| 4 | M. Shanmugam | DMK | 24 July 2025 | S. R. Sivalingam | DMK | 25 July 2025 |
| 5 | P. Wilson | DMK | 24 July 2025 | P. Wilson | DMK | 25 July 2025 |
| 6 | Vaiko | MDMK | 24 July 2025 | Kamal Haasan | MNM | 25 July 2025 |

=== October election ===
==== Jammu and Kashmir ====
| # | Previous MP | Party | Vacancy date | Elected MP | Party | Term start |
|---|---|---|---|---|---|---|
| 1 | Vacant (Shamsheer Singh Manhas) | | 10-Feb-2021 | Chowdry Mohammad Ramzan | JKNC | 25-Oct-2025 |
| 2 | Vacant (Fayaz Ahmad Mir) | | 10-Feb-2021 | Sajjad Ahmad Kichloo | JKNC | 25-Oct-2025 |
| 3 | Vacant (Nazir Ahmad Laway) | | 15-Feb-2021 | Gurwinder Singh Oberoi | JKNC | 25-Oct-2025 |
| 4 | Vacant (Ghulam Nabi Azad) | | 15-Feb-2021 | Sat Paul Sharma | BJP | 25-Oct-2025 |

== By-elections ==
=== Andhra Pradesh ===
| # | Previous MP | Party | Vacancy date | Elected MP | Party | Term start | Term end | Reason for Vacancy |
|---|---|---|---|---|---|---|---|---|
| 1 | V. Vijayasai Reddy | YSRCP | 25-Jan-2025 | P. Venkata Satyanarayana | BJP | 9-May-2025 | 21-Jun-2028 | Resignation |

=== Punjab ===
| # | Previous MP | Party | Vacancy date | Elected MP | Party | Term start | Term end | Reason for Vacancy |
|---|---|---|---|---|---|---|---|---|
| 1 | Sanjeev Arora | AAP | 1-July-2025 | Rajinder Gupta | AAP | 17-Oct-2025 | 09-Apr-2028 | Elected to 16th Punjab Assembly |

== Nominations ==
| # | Nominated MP | Affiliation | Field | Term start | Nominated by | Reference |
|---|---|---|---|---|---|---|
| 1 | Meenakshi Jain | NOM | Literature and Education | 13-July-2025 | Droupadi Murmu | |
| 2 | Harsh Vardhan Shringla | BJP | Diplomacy | 13-July-2025 | Droupadi Murmu | |
| 3 | Ujjwal Nikam | BJP | Law | 13-July-2025 | Droupadi Murmu | |
| 4 | C. Sadanandan Master | BJP | Social work | 13-July-2025 | Droupadi Murmu | |
