= By-elections to the 17th Tamil Nadu Assembly =

Indian election

2026-2031 Tamil Nadu Legislative Assembly By-elections
- 6 October 2026 - TBD

Vacant Seats in the Tamil Nadu Legislative Assembly
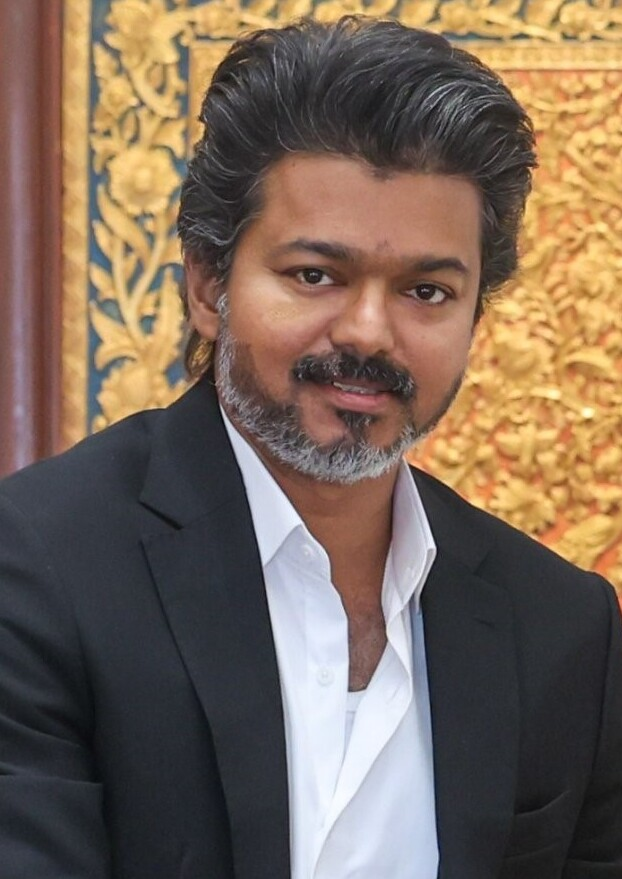

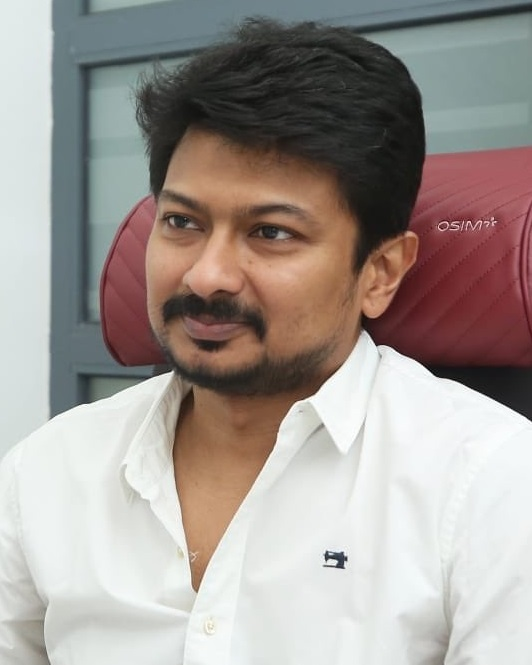

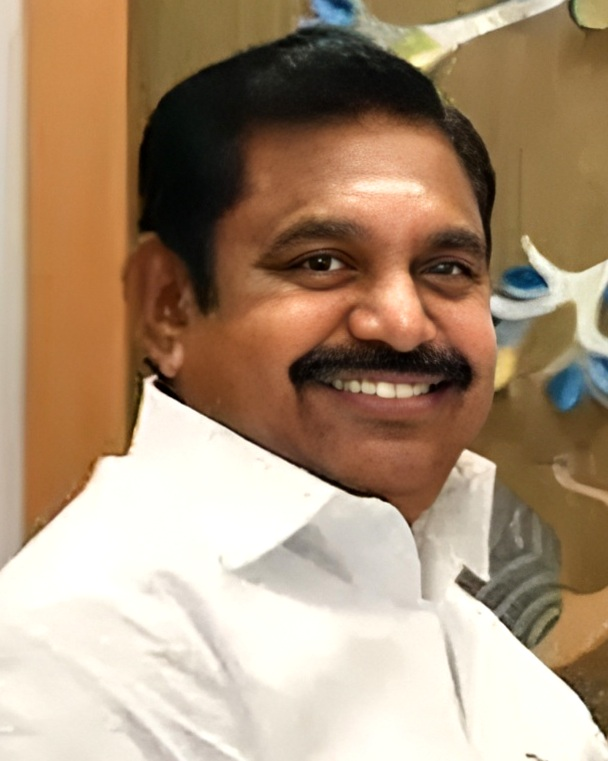
| | First party | Second party | Third party |
|---|---|---|---|
| Leader | C. Joseph Vijay | Udhayanidhi Stalin | Edappadi K. Palaniswami |
| Party | TVK | DMK | AIADMK |
| Alliance | SSJVA | DMK+ | AIADMK+ |
| Leader since | 2024 | 2026 | 2017 |
| Seats before | 108 | 59 | 47 |
| Alliance seats before | 116 | 60 | 53 |
Chief Minister before election
C. Joseph Vijay
TVK
Chief Minister after election
C. Joseph Vijay
TVK

The backdrop for the political developments in Tamil Nadu followed the 2026 Tamil Nadu Legislative Assembly election, held on 23 April 2026 as part of the 2026 elections in India. In the election, the Tamilaga Vettri Kazhagam (TVK), led by C. Joseph Vijay, secured 108 seats in the 234-member assembly. The Ruling Dravida Munnetra Kazhagam (DMK), led by M. K. Stalin, became the principal opposition party, with Udhayanidhi Stalin becoming Leader of Opposition, due to his father and then-Chief Minister, M.K. Stalin losing from his own seat of Kolathur.

== Background ==
The following MLAs resigned from the assembly after the 2026 Tamil Nadu Legislative Assembly election.

| Date | Constituency | | Previous MLA | Party | Reason | Elected MLA | Party |
|---|---|---|---|---|---|---|---|
| 6 October 2026 | 35 | Maduranthakam | Maragatham Kumaravel | All India Anna Dravida Munnetra Kazhagam | Resigned on 25 May 2026 | Maragatham Kumaravel | Tamilaga Vettri Kazhagam |
| 6 October 2026 | 101 | Dharapuram | P. Sathyabama | All India Anna Dravida Munnetra Kazhagam | Resigned on 25 May 2026 | P. Sathyabama | Tamilaga Vettri Kazhagam |
| TBD | 103 | Perundurai | S. Jayakumar | All India Anna Dravida Munnetra Kazhagam | Resigned on 25 May 2026 | TBD | |
| Election Petition Pending | 135 | Karur | M. R. Vijayabhaskar | All India Anna Dravida Munnetra Kazhagam | Resigned on 29 June 2026 | TBD | |
| Election Petition Pending | 141 | Tiruchirappalli East | C. Joseph Vijay | Tamilaga Vettri Kazhagam | Resigned on 10 May 2026 | TBD | |
| Election Petition Pending | 179 | Viralimalai | C. Vijayabaskar | All India Anna Dravida Munnetra Kazhagam | Resigned on 16 June 2026 | TBD | |
| Election Petition Pending | 225 | Ambasamudram | E. Subaya | All India Anna Dravida Munnetra Kazhagam | Resigned on 26 May 2026 | TBD | |
| TBD | 13 | Kolathur | V. S. Babu | Tamilaga Vettri Kazhagam | Died on 19 November 2026 | TBD | |

The resignation of 6 AIADMK legislators and their subsequent joining of the Tamilaga Vettri Kazhagam attracted political attention in the state. This act was described as Horse trading by Members of the Legislative Assembly of Tamil Nadu of Past Ruling party and current Opposition DMK.

== Phase-1: Maduranthakam and Dharapuram ==
2026 Tamil Nadu Legislative Assembly by-elections
- 6 October 2026

2 Seats in the Tamil Nadu Legislative Assembly
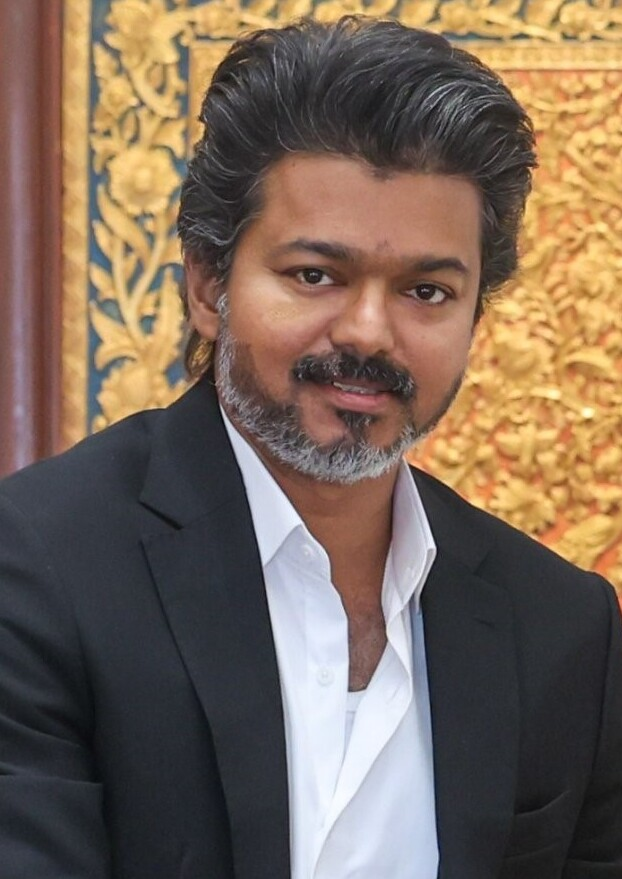

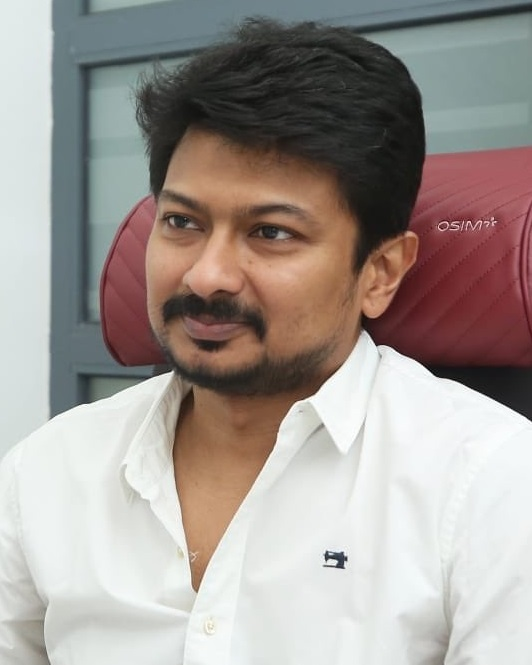

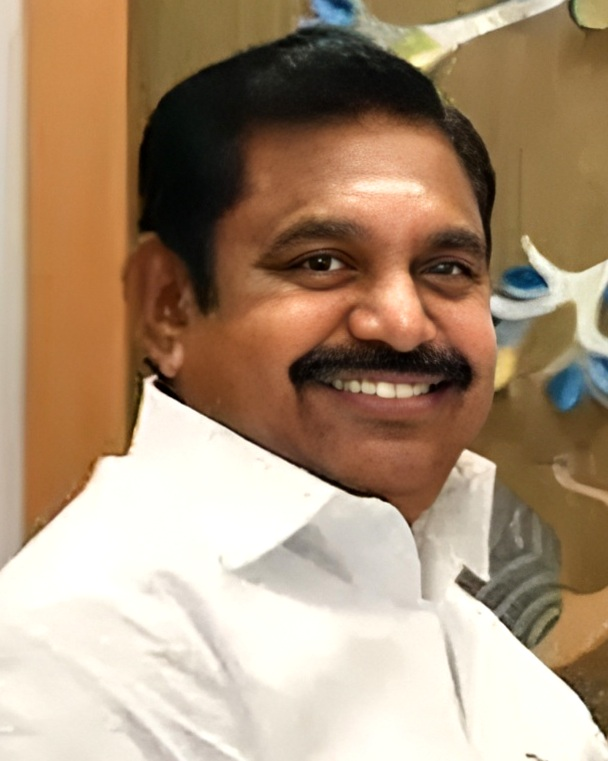
| | First party | Second party | Third party |
|---|---|---|---|
| Leader | C. Joseph Vijay | Udhayanidhi Stalin | Edappadi K. Palaniswami |
| Party | TVK | DMK | AIADMK |
| Alliance | SSJVA | DMK+ | AIADMK+ |
| Leader since | 2024 | 2026 | 2017 |
| Last election | 108 | 59 | 47 |
| Seats before | 107 | 59 | 41 |
| Seats won | 2 | 0 | 0 |
| Seats after | 109 | 59 | 41 |
| Seat change | ▲2 | Steady | Steady |
| Alliance seats before election | 116 | 60 | 46 |
| Alliance seats after election | 118 | 60 | 46 |
| Alliance seats needed for majority | check | X mark | X mark |
Chief Minister before election
C. Joseph Vijay
TVK
Chief Minister after election
C. Joseph Vijay
TVK

=== Schedule ===
The schedule for the October By-election was announced by the Election Commission of India on 7 September 2026.

| Event | Date |
|---|---|
| Date of Issue for Gazette Notification | 9 September 2026 |
| Deadline for filing nominations | 16 September 2026 |
| Scrutiny of nominations | 17 September 2026 |
| Deadline for withdrawal of nomination | 19 September 2026 |
| Polling | 6 October 2026 |
| Counting of votes | 9 October 2026 |
| Deadline for the completion of election process | 11 October 2026 |

=== Turnout ===
| Seat No. | Constituency | Turnout |
|---|---|---|
| 35 | Madurantakam | 86.26% |
| 101 | Dharapuram | 80.30% |

Source: Election Commission of India

=== Candidates ===
| District | # | Constituency | SSJVA | | | DMK+ | | AIADMK+ | | | |
|---|---|---|---|---|---|---|---|---|---|---|---|
| District | # | Constituency | Chengalpattu | 1 | Madurantakam | TVK | Maragatham Kumaravel | DMK | I. Paranthamen | ADMK | S. Kanitha Sampath |
| Thiruppur | 2 | Dharapuram | | TVK | P. Sathyabama | DMK | S. Suganya | ADMK | K. Banumathi | | |

=== Results ===
Source: Election Commission of India

| Party | Madurantakam | Dharapuram |
|---|---|---|
| TVK | 74,048 | 66,841 |
| DMK | 54,008 | 57,370 |
| AIADMK | 47,450 | 45,280 |
| NTK | 2,709 | 5,268 |
| LF | 1,986 | 1,157 |
| NOTA | 652 | 677 |

2026 Tamil Nadu Legislative Assembly Bye-election: Maduranthakam
| Party | Candidate | Votes | % | ±% |
|---|---|---|---|---|
| TVK | K. Maragatham | 74,048 | 39.96 | ▲10.76 |
| DMK | I. Paranthamen | 54,008 | 29.14 | ▲1.00 |
| AIADMK | S. Kanitha Sampath | 47,450 | 25.60 | ▼6.98 |
| NTK | Janakiraman | 2,709 | 1.46 | ▼1.04 |
| CPI(M) | Suganthi P. | 1,986 | 1.07 | New entry |
| Independent | Independent candidates | 4,439 | 2.39 | |
| NOTA | None of the above | 652 | 0.35 | ▼0.05 |
| Margin of victory | | 20,040 | 10.81 | ▲7.18 |
| Turnout | | 1,85,292 | 87.12 | ▼6.23 |
| Registered electors | | 2,12,666 | | |
| TVK gain from AIADMK | | Swing | | |

2026 Tamil Nadu Legislative Assembly Bye-election: Dharapuram
| Party | Candidate | Votes | % | ±% |
|---|---|---|---|---|
| TVK | P. Sathyabama | 66,841 | 37.02 | ▲13.79 |
| DMK | S. Suganya | 57,370 | 31.78 | ▼0.42 |
| AIADMK | K. Banumathi | 45,280 | 25.08 | ▼15.48 |
| NTK | M. Karthika | 5,268 | 2.92 | ▼0.09 |
| CPI | Lakshmanan P | 1,157 | 0.64 | New entry |
| NOTA | None of the above | 677 | 0.38 | |
| Margin of victory | | 9,471 | 5.24 | −3.12 |
| Turnout | | 1,80,532 | 81.12 | −8.84 |
| Registered electors | | 2,22,434 | | |
| TVK gain from AIADMK | | Swing | +13.79 | |

== Phase-2: ==
To be announced

Tamil Nadu Legislative Assembly by-elections
- TBD

5 Seats in the Tamil Nadu Legislative Assembly
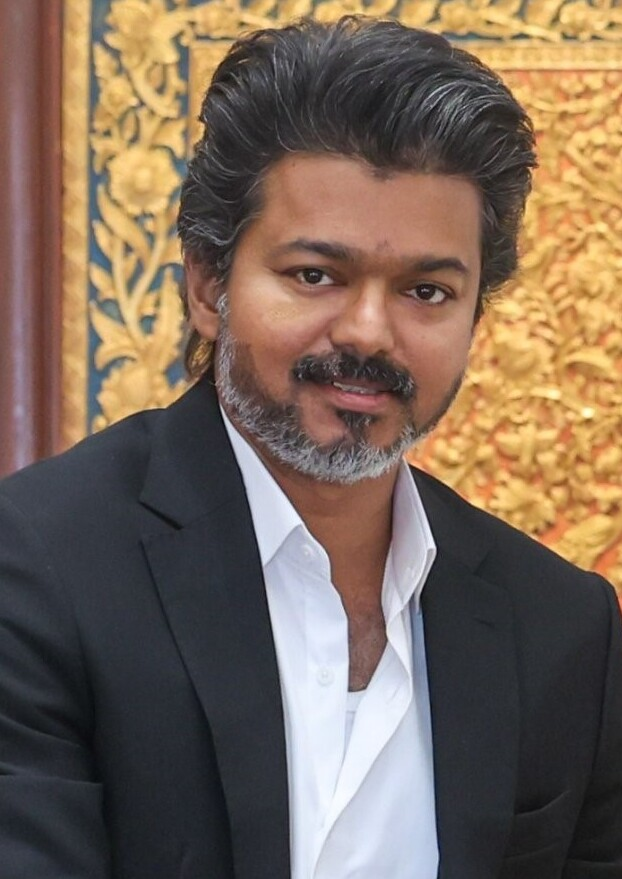

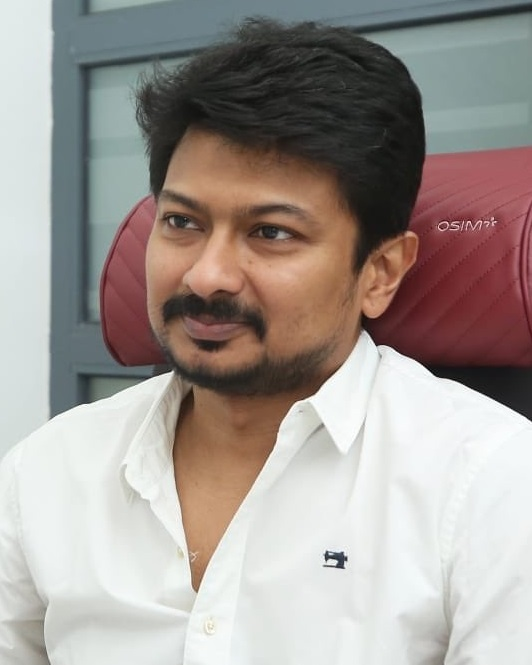

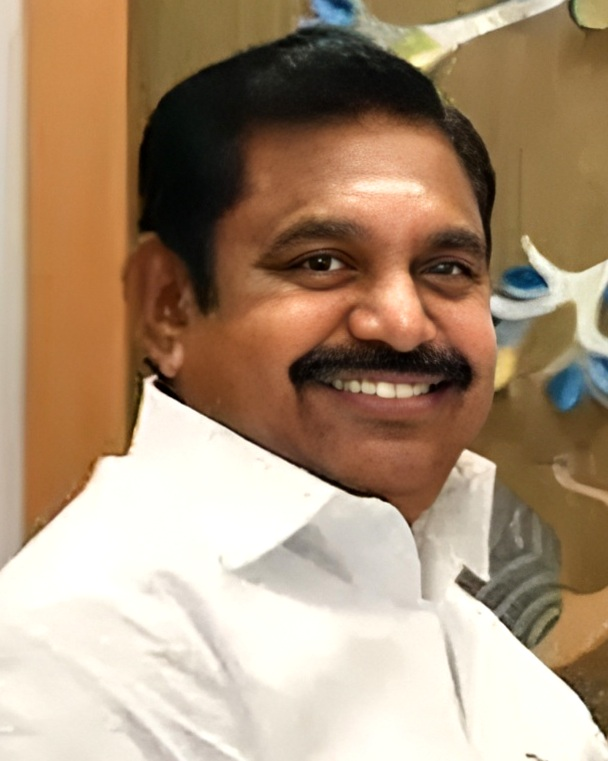
| Leader | C. Joseph Vijay | Udhayanidhi Stalin | Edappadi K. Palaniswami |
| Party | TVK | DMK | AIADMK |
| Alliance | SSJVA | DMK+ | AIADMK+ |
| Leader since | 2024 | 2026 | 2017 |
| Last election | 108 | 59 | 47 |
| Current seats | 108 | 59 | 41 |
| Seats needed | ▲10 | Not Possible | Not Possible |
| Alliance seats before election | 117 | 60 | 46 |
Incumbent Chief Minister
C. Joseph Vijay
TVK
