= P. Vasudevan =

Indian Politician

Member of the Tamilnadu Legislative Assembly for Maduranthakam
- In office 2001–2006
- Preceded by: S. K. Venkatesan
- Succeeded by: K. Gayathri Devi

Personal details
- Born: 10 June 1950 Perumalcheri
- Party: All India Anna Dravida Munnetra Kazhagam
- Profession: Rice Mill Owner

P. Vasudevan is an Indian politician and a former member of the Tamil Nadu Legislative Assembly. He is from Perumalcheri village in the Cheyyur taluk of the Chengalpattu district. Vasudevan has completed up to the tenth grade in school education. He belongs to the All India Anna Dravida Munnetra Kazhagam (AIADMK) party. He won the election from the Maduranthakam Assembly constituency in the 2001 Tamil Nadu Legislative Assembly election and became a Member of the Legislative Assembly (MLA).

== Electoral performance ==
=== 2001 ===
2001 Tamil Nadu Legislative Assembly election: Maduranthakam
Party	Candidate	Votes	%	±%
AIADMK	P. Vasudevan	57,610	51.10%	+11.16
DMK	S. D. Ugamchand	45,916	40.73%	−9.06
MDMK	L. S. Raveendranath	4,070	3.61%	−0.72
Independent	N. Venkatesan	1,895	1.68%	New
Puratchi Bharatham	M. Abiramalingam	1,215	1.08%	New
Independent	T. Maduraimuthu	700	0.62%	New
Margin of victory		11,694	10.37%	0.53%
Turnout		112,730	61.99%	−9.21%
Registered electors		181,901		
AIADMK gain from DMK		Swing	1.31%	
