= C. Arumugam =

Indian politician

Maduranthakam C. Arumugam, popularly known as Madhuranthagathar, was an Indian politician and former Member of the Legislative Assembly of Tamil Nadu. He was the founder member of Dravida Munetra Kazhagam. He was a member of the General Committee with C.N.Annadurai in the Chengai Anna District. He was elected to the Tamil Nadu legislative assembly from Maduranthakam constituency as a Dravida Munnetra Kazhagam candidate in 1971, 1977, and 1984. He was also Chengalpattu District secretary for Dravida Munnetra Kazhagam from 1971 to 1993. He was a close associate of Dravida Munetra Kazhagam chief Thiru M.Karunanidhi and he was a member of the Dravida Munetra Kazhagam Trust. He fought hard and won the 1984 Assembly elections against 90 people, then protested against Hindi imposition, burnt the copy of the Constitution of India. He was jailed for 45 days and was disqualified from Tamil Nadu Legislative assembly. He died on June 2, 2005.
