= B. Parameswaran =

Indian politician

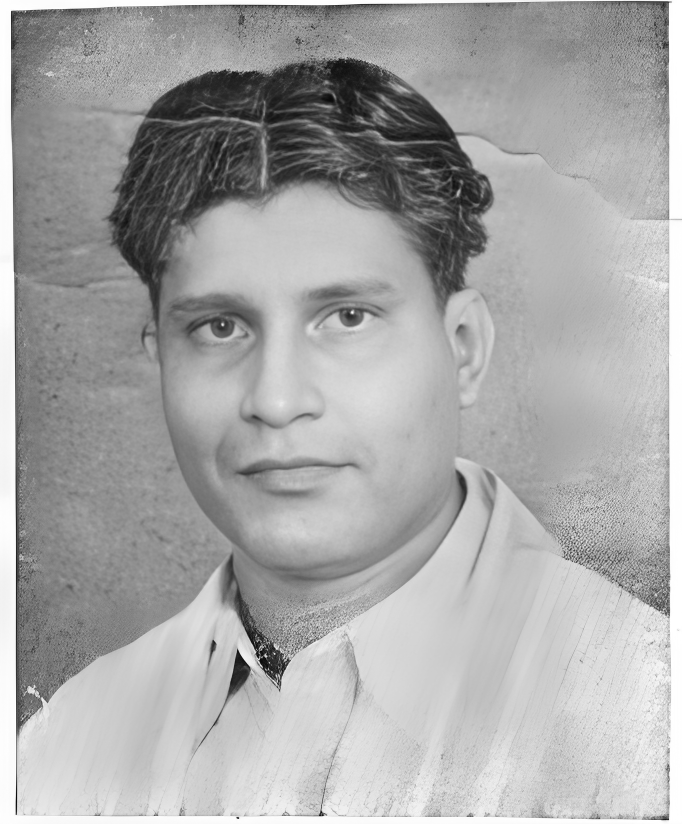

Member of the Madras State Assembly
- In office 1952 - 1957
- Preceded by: V. Venkatasubba Reddi
- Constituency: Maduranthakam
- In office 1962 - 1967
- Preceded by: P. S. Ellappan
- Constituency: Maduranthakam

Personal details
- Political party: Indian National Congress

Balasubramanian Parameswaran ( 20 January 1913 – 15 September 1966) was an Indian politician and former Member of the Legislative Assembly of Tamil Nadu. He was elected to the Tamil Nadu legislative assembly from Maduranthakam constituency as an Indian National Congress candidate in 1946, 1952, and 1962 elections. He was the grandson of Rettamalai Srinivasan, a pioneer in the Scheduled Caste movement. He was educated at the St. Gabriels High School and Presidency College, Madras. He served as private secretary to another Scheduled Caste leader M. C. Rajah. During 7 April 1949 – 9 April 1952, he was the minister for Firka development, Khadi, Cottage industries, Fisheries, Cinchona and Harijan uplift in the P.S Kumaraswamy Raja ministry. During 1952–54, he was the mayor of Madras. From 13 April 1954 until 31 March 1957, he was the minister for Transport, Harijan Uplift, Hindu Religious Endowments, Registration and Prohibition in Kamaraj ministry. During 1958–62, he was a member of the Rajya Sabha – the upper house of the Indian parliament.
