= V. Maitreyan =

Indian oncologist and politician

Dr V. Maitreyan

MP of Rajya Sabha for Tamil Nadu
- In office 25 July 2007 – 24 July 2019
- Preceded by: P. G. Narayanan
- Succeeded by: N. Chandrasegharan
- Constituency: Tamil Nadu
- In office 15 January 2002 – 29 June 2004
- Preceded by: G. K. Moopanar
- Succeeded by: K. Malaisamy
- Constituency: Tamil Nadu

Personal details
- Born: 21 September 1955 (age 71) Chennai, Tamil Nadu
- Party: DMK (Since 2025)
- Other political affiliations: Bharatiya Janata Party (till 1999 & 2023-24); AIADMK (1999–2022, 2024-2025)

Vasudevan Maitreyan (born 21 November 1955) is an Indian oncologist and politician from Dravida Munnetra Kazhagam, he was a member of the Rajya Sabha, the upper house of the Parliament of India representing All India Anna Dravida Munnetra Kazhagam, for 3 terms from January 2002 to June 2004 and again from July 2007 to July 2019. He was Organizing Secretary of AIADMK.

== Early life and education ==
Maitreyan was born to Indian independence activist K. R. Vasudevan and his wife Manga Vasudevan on 21 November 1955 in a Vadagalai Iyengar family. He had his schooling in Madras and graduated in medicine from the Government Medical College, Nagpur. On completion of his graduation, Maitreyan pursued his M. D. in Medical Oncology from the Madras Medical College and did his D. M. in Medical Oncology from the Cancer Institute, Madras University.

Maitreyan practised as an oncologist.

== Political career ==
Right from his early days, Maitreyan was a member of the Rashtriya Swayamsevak Sangh (RSS). In 1991, he became an executive member of the Tamil Nadu unit of the Bharatiya Janata Party (BJP). He served as General Secretary of BJP's Tamil Nadu unit from 1995 to 1997, Vice President from 1997 to 1999 and President for sometime in 1999. After getting suspended for anti-party activities, he resigned from the BJP in July 1999, protesting against the party high command's decision to align with the DMK for the 1999 Lok Sabha Elections and joined the All India Anna Dravida Munnetra Kazhagam (AIADMK).

He was nominated to Rajya Sabha in an interim vacancy in 2002, following the death of Moopanar in the previous year. He was again nominated as Rajyasabha MP twice in 2007 and 2013. He was expelled from the primary membership of the AIADMK party in 2022. He joined BJP on 9 June 2023 and became its national executive committee member in August 2023.

On 12 September 2024, he quit the BJP and rejoined the All India Anna Dravida Munnetra Kazhagam in the presence of its general secretary Edappadi K. Palaniswami. On 28 January 2025, he was appointed as Organizing Secretary of AIADMK. On 13 August 2025, he joined the DMK in the presence of Its leader M. K. Stalin.

== Rajya Sabha Election History ==
Position	Party	Constituency	From	To	Tenure
Member of Parliament, Rajya Sabha (1st Term)	AIADMK	Tamil Nadu	15 January 2002	29 June 2004	2 years, 166 days
Member of Parliament, Rajya Sabha (2nd Term)	AIADMK	Tamil Nadu	25 July 2007	24 July 2013	5 years, 364 days
Member of Parliament, Rajya Sabha (3rd Term)	AIADMK	Tamil Nadu	25 July 2013	24 July 2019	5 years, 364 days

== See also ==
Rajya Sabha members from Tamil Nadu
