= K. Manoharan =

Indian politician

K. Manoharan is an Indian politician and was a member of the 14th Tamil Nadu Legislative Assembly from Thiruporur constituency. He represented the All India Anna Dravida Munnetra Kazhagam party.

The elections of 2016 resulted in his constituency being won by M. Kothandapani.
