= P. Saravanan (politician) =

Indian politician (born 1981)

Palani Saravanan (born 1981), also known as Saravanamoorthy, is an Indian politician from Tamil Nadu. He is a member of the Tamil Nadu Legislative Assembly from Sholinganallur Assembly constituency, in the erstwhile Chengalpattu district, presently in Chennai district, representing Tamilaga Vettri Kazhagam.

== Early life ==
Saravanan is from Sholinganallur, Chennai district. He is the son of Palani. He studied up to Class 5 at Government Higher Secondary School, Thiruvanmiyur, Chennai and dropped out of school in 1992. He declared assets worth Rs.50 lakhs to the Election Commission of India.

== Career ==
Saravanan became an MLA for the first time winning the 2026 Tamil Nadu Legislative Assembly election from Sholinganallur Assembly constituency representing Tamilaga Vettri Kazhagam. He polled 2,20,382 votes and defeated his nearest rival and sitting MLA, S. Aravind Ramesh of the Dravida Munnetra Kazhagam, by a margin of 96,780 votes.
