= Madurantakam Assembly constituency =

State Legislative Assembly Constituency in Tamil Nadu

Coordinates: 12.5101°N 79.8849°E

Maduranthakam
- Constituency No. 35 for the Tamil Nadu Legislative Assembly

Constituency details
- Country: India
- Region: South India
- State: Tamil Nadu
- District: Chengalpattu
- Lok Sabha constituency: Kancheepuram
- Established: 1951
- Total electors: 2,12,666
- Reservation: SC

Member of Legislative Assembly
- 17th Tamil Nadu Legislative Assembly
- Incumbent Maragatham Kumaravel
- Party: TVK
- Alliance: TVK+
- Elected year: 2026^

Madurantakam is a legislative assembly constituency in the Indian state of Tamil Nadu. Its State Assembly Constituency number is 35. It forms a part of Kancheepuram Lok Sabha Constituency for national elections to the Parliament of India. It is reserved for candidates from the Scheduled Castes. It is one of the 234 State Legislative Assembly Constituencies in Tamil Nadu.

The 2026 Madurantakam by-election was necessitated by the resignation of K. Maragatham Kumaravel, who had been elected as an AIADMK candidate in the 2026 Tamil Nadu Legislative Assembly election. She subsequently joined the Tamilaga Vettri Kazhagam (TVK), contested the by-election as its candidate, and retained the seat. Opposition legislators described her party switch and the subsequent by-election as “horse-trading”.

== Members of Legislative Assembly ==
Year	Member	Political party
Madras State
1952	B. Parameswaran	Indian National Congress
1957	O. Venkatasubba Reddy	Independent
1962	B. Parameswaran	Indian National Congress
1967	Kothandam	Dravida Munnetra Kazhagam
Tamil Nadu
1971	C. Arumugam	Dravida Munnetra Kazhagam
1977	C. Arumugam	Dravida Munnetra Kazhagam
1980	S. D. Ugamchand	All India Anna Dravida Munnetra Kazhagam
1984	C. Arumugam	Dravida Munnetra Kazhagam
1989	S. D. Ugamchand	All India Anna Dravida Munnetra Kazhagam
1991	P. Chockalingam	All India Anna Dravida Munnetra Kazhagam
1996	S. K. Venkatesan	Dravida Munnetra Kazhagam
2001	P. Vasudevan	All India Anna Dravida Munnetra Kazhagam
2006	K. Gayathri Devi	Indian National Congress
2011	S. Kanitha Sampath	All India Anna Dravida Munnetra Kazhagam
2016	S. Pugazhenthi	Dravida Munnetra Kazhagam
2021	K. Maragatham	All India Anna Dravida Munnetra Kazhagam
2026	K. Maragatham	All India Anna Dravida Munnetra Kazhagam
2026^	K. Maragatham	Tamilaga Vettri Kazhagam

== Election results ==
Vote share of winning candidates
2026^	39.96%
2026	34.95%
2021	47.20%
2016	41.43%
2011	53.64%
2006	43.52%
2001	51.10%
1996	49.79%
1991	54.11%
1989	41.93%
1984	46.21%
1980	56.84%
1977	36.08%
1971	64.53%
1967	59.20%
1962	51.67%
1957	19.20%
1952	19.57%

=== 2026 By-election ===
2026 Tamil Nadu Legislative Assembly Bye-election: Maduranthakam
Party	Candidate	Votes	%	±%
TVK	K. Maragatham	74,048	39.96	▲10.76
DMK	I. Paranthamen	54,008	29.14	▲1.00
AIADMK	S. Kanitha Sampath	47,450	25.60	▼6.98
NTK	Janakiraman	2,709	1.46	▼1.04
CPI(M)	Suganthi P.	1,986	1.07	New entry
Independent	Independent candidates	4,166	2.25	
Others	Other party candidates	273	0.15	
NOTA	None of the above	652	0.35	▼0.05
Margin of victory		20,040	10.81	▲7.18
Turnout		1,85,292	87.12	▼6.23
Registered electors		2,12,666		
TVK gain from AIADMK		Swing		

=== 2026 ===
2026 Tamil Nadu Legislative Assembly election: Madurantakam
Party	Candidate	Votes	%	±%
AIADMK	Maragatham Kumaravel. K	69,284	32.58	▼14.62
TVK	Ezhil Katharine Ezhilmalai	62,090	29.20	New
DMK	S. Amulu Ponmalar	59,838	28.14	New
NTK	G. Janakiraman	4,950	2.50	▼2.56
NOTA	NOTA	797	0.40	▼0.35
BSP	Neelam E. Ramkumar	374	0.19	New
Independent	Ranjitham. M	357	0.18	New
Margin of victory		7,194	3.63	▲1.69
Turnout		1,98,551	93.36	▲12.36
Registered electors		2,12,666		▼14,019
AIADMK hold		Swing	▼12.25	

=== 2021 ===
2021 Tamil Nadu Legislative Assembly election: Maduranthakam
Party	Candidate	Votes	%	±%
AIADMK	Maragatham Kumaravel. K	86,646	47.20	▲7.43
MDMK	C. E. Sathya	83,076	45.25	▲3.83
NTK	P. Sumitha	9,293	5.06	New
DMDK	N. Moorthi	2,137	1.16	▼5.45
MNM	K. Dinesh	1,488	0.81	New
NOTA	NOTA	1,371	0.75	−0.11
Margin of victory		3,570	1.94	0.28
Turnout		183,576	80.98	−0.30
Rejected ballots		223	0.12	
Registered electors		226,685		
AIADMK gain from DMK		Swing	5.77	

=== 2016 ===
2016 Tamil Nadu Legislative Assembly election: Maduranthakam
Party	Candidate	Votes	%	±%
DMK	S. Pugazhenthi	73,693	41.43	New
AIADMK	C. K. Thamizharasan	70,736	39.77	−13.88
PMK	E. Adhikesavan	16,215	9.12	New
DMDK	M. Thennarasu	11,773	6.62	New
NOTA	NOTA	1,525	0.86	New
Margin of victory		2,957	1.66	−10.86
Turnout		177,879	81.29	−0.57
Registered electors		218,831		
DMK gain from AIADMK		Swing	-12.22	

=== 2011 ===
2011 Tamil Nadu Legislative Assembly election: Maduranthakam
Party	Candidate	Votes	%	±%
AIADMK	S. Kanitha Sampath	79,256	53.64	+13.26
INC	Dr. K. Jayakumar	60,762	41.13	−2.4
Independent	C. Jaisankar	1,885	1.28	New
BJP	R. Varadhan	1,630	1.10	−0.84
Independent	V. R. Paramasivam	1,223	0.83	New
Loktantrik Samajwadi	M. Dhanasekaran	886	0.60	New
BSP	S. Vinayagam	784	0.53	−0.31
Margin of victory		18,494	12.52	9.37
Turnout		147,744	81.85	5.87
Registered electors		180,495		
AIADMK gain from INC		Swing	10.12	

=== 2006 ===
2006 Tamil Nadu Legislative Assembly election: Maduranthakam
Party	Candidate	Votes	%	±%
INC	K. Ghayathri Devi	51,106	43.52	New
AIADMK	K. Appadurai	47,415	40.38	−10.72
DMDK	D. Gajendran	9,885	8.42	New
BJP	M. Sundara Moorthy	2,282	1.94	New
Independent	S. Menaka	1,840	1.57	New
Independent	C. Natarajan	1,256	1.07	New
Independent	M. Devaraj	1,178	1.00	New
BSP	P. Rajendrababu	989	0.84	New
Margin of victory		3,691	3.14	−7.23
Turnout		117,418	75.98	14.00
Registered electors		154,532		
INC gain from AIADMK		Swing	-7.58	

=== 2001 ===
2001 Tamil Nadu Legislative Assembly election: Maduranthakam
Party	Candidate	Votes	%	±%
AIADMK	P. Vasudevan	57,610	51.10	+11.16
DMK	S. D. Ugamchand	45,916	40.73	−9.06
MDMK	L. S. Raveendranath	4,070	3.61	−0.72
Independent	N. Venkatesan	1,895	1.68	New
Puratchi Bharatham	M. Abiramalingam	1,215	1.08	New
Independent	T. Maduraimuthu	700	0.62	New
Margin of victory		11,694	10.37	0.53
Turnout		112,730	61.99	−9.21
Registered electors		181,901		
AIADMK gain from DMK		Swing	1.31	

=== 1996 ===
1996 Tamil Nadu Legislative Assembly election: Maduranthakam
Party	Candidate	Votes	%	±%
DMK	S. K. Venkatesan	53,563	49.79	New
AIADMK	Ugamchand. S. D.	42,970	39.94	−14.17
PMK	G. Gunasekaran	4,837	4.50	New
MDMK	K. R. Veeraraghavan	4,663	4.33	New
Margin of victory		10,593	9.85	−8.68
Turnout		107,573	71.20	1.00
Registered electors		159,346		
DMK gain from AIADMK		Swing	-4.32	

=== 1991 ===
1991 Tamil Nadu Legislative Assembly election: Maduranthakam
Party	Candidate	Votes	%	±%
AIADMK	P. Chockalingam	53,752	54.11	+12.18
Thayaga Marumalarchi Kazhagam	S. D. Ugamchand	35,349	35.59	New
PMK	K. Narayanaswamy Alias Mani Arasu	7,667	7.72	New
BJP	S. Adikesavalu	862	0.87	New
Independent	N. R. Janarthanan	503	0.51	New
Margin of victory		18,403	18.53	14.73
Turnout		99,336	70.20	0.03
Registered electors		149,439		
AIADMK hold		Swing	12.18	

=== 1989 ===
1989 Tamil Nadu Legislative Assembly election: Maduranthakam
Party	Candidate	Votes	%	±%
AIADMK	S. D. Ugamchand	38,704	41.93	New
DMK	C. Arumugam	35,196	38.13	−8.08
INC	A. Gopanna	10,676	11.57	−31.93
AIADMK	B. Dhanasekaran	6,205	6.72	New
Margin of victory		3,508	3.80	1.08
Turnout		92,311	70.17	−6.31
Registered electors		134,445		
AIADMK gain from DMK		Swing	-4.28	

=== 1984 ===
1984 Tamil Nadu Legislative Assembly election: Maduranthakam
Party	Candidate	Votes	%	±%
DMK	C. Arumugam	40,105	46.21	+3.68
INC	Sachuthanandam	37,745	43.49	New
Independent	K. Kesavan	538	0.62	New
Independent	C. Angammal	458	0.53	New
Margin of victory		2,360	2.72	−11.59
Turnout		86,784	76.48	1.01
Registered electors		120,021		
DMK gain from AIADMK		Swing	-10.63	

=== 1980 ===
1980 Tamil Nadu Legislative Assembly election: Maduranthakam
Party	Candidate	Votes	%	±%
AIADMK	S. D. Ugamchand	46,922	56.84	+32.19
DMK	C. Arumugam	35,113	42.54	+6.46
Margin of victory		11,809	14.31	4.50
Turnout		82,549	75.47	2.66
Registered electors		111,475		
AIADMK gain from DMK		Swing	20.77	

=== 1977 ===
1977 Tamil Nadu Legislative Assembly election: Maduranthakam
Party	Candidate	Votes	%	±%
DMK	C. Arumugam	26,977	36.08	−28.46
INC	S. D. Ugamchand	19,645	26.27	−9.2
AIADMK	V. Venka	18,434	24.65	New
JP	O. N. Duraibaboo	8,019	10.72	New
Independent	D. Kanakasabapathy	968	1.29	New
Independent	V. T. R. Veerappan	736	0.98	New
Margin of victory		7,332	9.80	−19.26
Turnout		74,779	72.81	−3.71
Registered electors		104,339		
DMK hold		Swing	-28.46	

=== 1971 ===
1971 Tamil Nadu Legislative Assembly election: Maduranthakam
Party	Candidate	Votes	%	±%
DMK	C. Arumugam	42,295	64.53	+5.33
INC	V. Gopal Reddiar	23,246	35.47	−3.4
Margin of victory		19,049	29.06	8.73
Turnout		65,541	76.52	−3.23
Registered electors		88,600		
DMK hold		Swing	5.33	

=== 1967 ===
1967 Madras Legislative Assembly election: Maduranthakam
Party	Candidate	Votes	%	±%
DMK	Kothandam	38,382	59.20	New
INC	G. Reddy	25,200	38.87	−12.8
Independent	V. Krishnaswamy	1,248	1.93	New
Margin of victory		13,182	20.33	2.41
Turnout		64,830	79.75	9.65
Registered electors		84,920		
DMK gain from INC		Swing	7.53	

=== 1962 ===
1962 Madras Legislative Assembly election: Maduranthakam
Party	Candidate	Votes	%	±%
INC	B. Parameswaran	29,743	51.67	+32.48
SWA	P. S. Ellappan	19,424	33.75	New
Independent	K. Ariasankaran	6,119	10.63	New
Independent	S. Dasarathan	2,274	3.95	New
Margin of victory		10,319	17.93	16.50
Turnout		57,560	70.11	−9.67
Registered electors		88,704		
INC hold		Swing	32.48	

=== 1957 ===
1957 Madras Legislative Assembly election: Maduranthakam
Party	Candidate	Votes	%	±%
INC	O. Venkatasubba Reddy	24,402	19.20	−0.37
Independent	O. N. Dorajbabu	22,585	17.77	New
Independent	V. L. Raja	19,250	15.14	New
Independent	Ellappan (Sc)	18,516	14.57	New
Independent	Kothandarama Reddy	15,784	12.42	New
Independent	Angesan (Sc)	8,230	6.47	New
Margin of victory		1,817	1.43	−1.49
Turnout		127,112	79.77	−4.51
Registered electors		159,340		
INC hold		Swing	-0.37	

=== 1952 ===
1952 Madras Legislative Assembly election: Maduranthakam
Party	Candidate	Votes	%	±%
INC	B. Parameswaran	20,926	19.57	New
RPI	K. Muthulinga Reddiar	13,431	12.56	New
Socialist Party (India)	Kothandarama Reddiar	13,268	12.41	New
KMPP	V. Jayachandran	8,701	8.14	New
Independent	Venugopala Nayagar	6,286	5.88	New
Margin of victory		3,120	2.92	
Turnout		106,947	84.29	
Registered electors		126,884		
INC win (new seat)				
