= S. D. Ugamchand =

Indian politician (died 2018)

S. D. Ugamchand (Hukum Chand) (died 2018) was an Indian politician and Member of the Legislative Assembly of Tamil Nadu. He was elected to the Tamil Nadu legislative assembly from Maduranthakam constituency as an Anna Dravida Munnetra Kazhagam candidate in 1980, and 1989 elections. He Joined Dravida Munnetra Kazhagam He was also the Chairman of Tamil Nadu Water Board and Tamil Nadu Warehouse Corporation.
