= Thiruporur Assembly constituency =

State Legislative Assembly Constituency in Tamil Nadu

Coordinates: 12.729°N 80.191°E

Thiruporur
- Constituency No. 33 for the Tamil Nadu Legislative Assembly

Constituency details
- Country: India
- Region: South India
- State: Tamil Nadu
- District: Chengalpattu
- Lok Sabha constituency: Kancheepuram
- Established: 1951
- Total electors: 2,94,452

Member of Legislative Assembly
- 17th Tamil Nadu Legislative Assembly
- Incumbent B. Vijayaraj
- Party: TVK
- Alliance: SPA
- Elected year: 2026

Thiruporur is a state assembly constituency in Chengalpattu district of Tamil Nadu, India. Its State Assembly Constituency number is 33. It is one of the 234 State Legislative Assembly Constituencies in Tamil Nadu.

== Members of Legislative Assembly ==
Year	Member	Political party
Madras State
1952	M. R. Ramachandran	Indian National Congress
1967	M. Adhi	Dravida Munnetra Kazhagam
Tamil Nadu
1971	M. Munu Adhi	Dravida Munnetra Kazhagam
1977	G. Chokkalingam	Dravida Munnetra Kazhagam
1980	G. Chokkalingam	Dravida Munnetra Kazhagam
1984	Thamizhmani	All India Anna Dravida Munnetra Kazhagam
1989	D. Thirumurthy	Dravida Munnetra Kazhagam
1991	M. Dhanpal	All India Anna Dravida Munnetra Kazhagam
1996	G. Chockalingam	Dravida Munnetra Kazhagam
2001	S. Kanitha Sampath	All India Anna Dravida Munnetra Kazhagam
2006	D. Moorthy	Pattali Makkal Katchi
2011	K. Manoharan	All India Anna Dravida Munnetra Kazhagam
2016	M. Kothandapani	All India Anna Dravida Munnetra Kazhagam
2019^	L. Idhayavarman	Dravida Munnetra Kazhagam
2021	S. S. Balaji	Viduthalai Chiruthaigal Katchi
2026	B. Vijayaraj	Tamilaga Vettri Kazhagam

== Election results ==
Vote share of winning candidates
2026	41.96%
2021	41.80%
2019 by-election	47.53%
2016	34.91%
2011	53.06%
2006	45.07%
2001	54.64%
1996	50.77%
1991	56.55%
1989	40.65%
1984	47.28%
1980	50.63%
1977	44.78%
1971	57.00%
1967	60.03%
1952	37.47%

=== 2026 ===
2026 Tamil Nadu Legislative Assembly election: Thiruporur
Party	Candidate	Votes	%	±%
TVK	B. Vijayaraj	110,095	41.96	New
VCK	R. Panneerdoss	70,744	26.96	▼14.84
PMK	K. Balu	67,392	25.68	▼15.26
NTK	Ambeth Rajan	9,616	3.66	▼5.43
NOTA	NOTA	1,248	0.48	▼0.40
BSP	Dr. D. Vinoth Kumar	535	0.20	▼0.31
Margin of victory		39,351	15.00	▲14.13
Turnout		2,62,409	89.12	▲12.84
Registered electors		2,94,452		▼168
TVK gain from VCK		Swing	▲41.96	

=== 2021 ===
2021 Tamil Nadu Legislative Assembly election: Thiruporur
Party	Candidate	Votes	%	±%
VCK	S. S. Balaji	93,954	41.80%	
PMK	K. Arumugam	92,007	40.94%	
NTK	S. Mohana Sundari	20,428	9.09%	8.18%
MNM	Lavanya. N	8,194	3.65%	
AMMK	Kothandapani. M	7,662	3.41%	
NOTA	Nota	1,982	0.88%	−0.17%
BSP	V. K. Pakkiri Ambadkar	1,135	0.51%	0.36%
Margin of victory		1,947	0.87%	0.39%
Turnout		2,24,747	76.28%	−2.81%
Rejected ballots		101	0.04%	
Registered electors		2,94,620		
VCK gain from DMK		Swing	6.90%	

=== 2019 by-election ===
2019 Tamil Nadu Legislative Assembly by-elections: Thiruporur
Party	Candidate	Votes	%	±%
DMK	L. Idhayavarman	103,248	47.53	+13.09
AIADMK	S. Arumugam	82,235	37.86	+2.77
AMMK	M. Kothandapani	11,936	5.49	+5.49
NTK	S. Mohanasundari	9,910	4.56	+3.65
MNM	U. Karunakaran	6,039	2.78	+2.78
NOTA	None of the Above	2,243	1.03	+0.02
Majority		21,013	9.67	+9.20
Turnout		2,17,419	80.29	+1.20
DMK gain from AIADMK		Swing	+12.62	

=== 2016 ===
2016 Tamil Nadu Legislative Assembly election: Thiruporur
Party	Candidate	Votes	%	±%
AIADMK	M. Kothandapani	70,215	34.91%	−18.15%
DMK	Viswanathan. V	69,265	34.44%	
PMK	Vasu. K	28,125	13.98%	
MDMK	Sathya. C. E	25,539	12.70%	
BJP	Rangaswamy. V. G	2,605	1.30%	0.30%
NOTA	None Of The Above	2,116	1.05%	
NTK	Ellalan Yusuf. I	1,836	0.91%	
Margin of victory		950	0.47%	−11.06%
Turnout		2,01,141	79.09%	−3.53%
Registered electors		2,54,307		
AIADMK hold		Swing	-18.15%	

=== 2011 ===
2011 Tamil Nadu Legislative Assembly election: Thiruporur
Party	Candidate	Votes	%	±%
AIADMK	K. Manoharan	84,169	53.06%	14.24%
PMK	K. Arumugam	65,881	41.53%	
Puratchi Bharatham	G. Sivalingam	1,598	1.01%	
BJP	N. Gopalakrishnan	1,579	1.00%	−0.22%
Independent	G. Rajamuthu	1,367	0.86%	
Independent	S. Anandbabu	902	0.57%	
BSP	S. Saravanan	807	0.51%	−0.21%
Margin of victory		18,288	11.53%	5.28%
Turnout		1,92,007	82.62%	17.00%
Registered electors		1,58,639		
AIADMK gain from PMK		Swing	7.99%	

=== 2006 ===
2006 Tamil Nadu Legislative Assembly election: Thiruporur
Party	Candidate	Votes	%	±%
PMK	Moorthy. D	73,328	45.07%	
AIADMK	M. Dhanapal	63,164	38.82%	−15.82%
DMDK	Kannappan. K	19,227	11.82%	
BJP	Ponvaratharajan. M	1,979	1.22%	
BSP	Srinivasan. M	1,177	0.72%	
CPI(ML)L	Eraniappan. C	955	0.59%	−0.61%
Independent	Jagadeesan. V	926	0.57%	
Margin of victory		10,164	6.25%	−11.88%
Turnout		1,62,708	65.62%	7.54%
Registered electors		2,47,954		
PMK gain from AIADMK		Swing	-9.57%	

=== 2001 ===
2001 Tamil Nadu Legislative Assembly election: Thiruporur
Party	Candidate	Votes	%	±%
AIADMK	S. Kanitha Sampath	74,716	54.64%	29.81%
DMK	Nagarajan C	49,926	36.51%	−14.26%
MDMK	Seeman P	5,082	3.72%	−5.49%
Independent	Anandan. V	2,711	1.98%	
Puratchi Bharatham	Udayakumar N	2,676	1.96%	
CPI(ML)L	Eraniappan C	1,636	1.20%	0.34%
Margin of victory		24,790	18.13%	−7.82%
Turnout		1,36,747	58.08%	−10.71%
Registered electors		2,35,443		
AIADMK gain from DMK		Swing	3.87%	

=== 1996 ===
1996 Tamil Nadu Legislative Assembly election: Thiruporur
Party	Candidate	Votes	%	±%
DMK	G. Chockalingam	62,414	50.77%	22.90%
AIADMK	Loganathan. N. K.	30,518	24.82%	−31.73%
PMK	Narayanasamy. K. @ Maniarasu	13,960	11.36%	
MDMK	Sathiyaseelan. E.	11,322	9.21%	
Independent	Viswanathan. D.	1,770	1.44%	
BJP	Mani. M. G.	1,144	0.93%	0.26%
CPI(ML)L	Iraniappan. C.	1,049	0.85%	
Margin of victory		31,896	25.95%	−2.74%
Turnout		1,22,935	68.79%	0.40%
Registered electors		1,88,360		
DMK gain from AIADMK		Swing	-5.78%	

=== 1991 ===
1991 Tamil Nadu Legislative Assembly election: Thiruporur
Party	Candidate	Votes	%	±%
AIADMK	M. Dhanpal	60,262	56.55%	20.15%
DMK	G. Chockalingam	29,698	27.87%	−12.78%
PMK	C. Palanisamy	15,529	14.57%	
BJP	A. Veerabadran	714	0.67%	0.15%
Margin of victory		30,564	28.68%	24.44%
Turnout		1,06,559	68.39%	8.18%
Registered electors		1,59,767		
AIADMK gain from DMK		Swing	15.90%	

=== 1989 ===
1989 Tamil Nadu Legislative Assembly election: Thiruporur
Party	Candidate	Votes	%	±%
DMK	Thirumurthy. D. M	33,638	40.65%	1.36%
AIADMK	Govindarajan. M. M	30,126	36.41%	−10.87%
AIADMK	Thamizh Mani. V. M	9,479	11.46%	−35.82%
INC	Mnusamy. K. M	7,795	9.42%	
BJP	Mani. M. G. M	433	0.52%	−0.11%
Margin of victory		3,512	4.24%	−3.75%
Turnout		82,749	60.21%	−14.87%
Registered electors		1,40,584		
DMK gain from AIADMK		Swing	-6.63%	

=== 1984 ===
1984 Tamil Nadu Legislative Assembly election: Thiruporur
Party	Candidate	Votes	%	±%
AIADMK	Thamizhmani	38,075	47.28%	0.14%
DMK	Chokkalingam. G.	31,641	39.29%	−11.34%
Independent	Govindarasan. M.	9,959	12.37%	
BJP	Rajamani. D.	513	0.64%	
Independent	Kuppan	345	0.43%	
Margin of victory		6,434	7.99%	4.50%
Turnout		80,533	75.08%	11.17%
Registered electors		1,13,888		
AIADMK gain from DMK		Swing	-3.35%	

=== 1980 ===
1980 Tamil Nadu Legislative Assembly election: Thiruporur
Party	Candidate	Votes	%	±%
DMK	G. Chockalingam	33,287	50.63%	5.85%
AIADMK	Govindarasan. M	30,990	47.13%	6.13%
Independent	Dhanapal. V	572	0.87%	
Independent	Jayachandran. N	562	0.85%	
Independent	Krishnan. N	338	0.51%	
Margin of victory		2,297	3.49%	−0.28%
Turnout		65,749	63.92%	5.56%
Registered electors		1,04,235		
DMK hold		Swing	5.85%	

=== 1977 ===
1977 Tamil Nadu Legislative Assembly election: Thiruporur
Party	Candidate	Votes	%	±%
DMK	G. Chockalingam	24,932	44.78%	−12.22%
AIADMK	T. Radha	22,831	41.00%	
JP	R. Dakshinamoorthy	5,910	10.61%	
RPI(A)	G. Naghamani	712	1.28%	
Independent	N. Jayachandran	672	1.21%	
Independent	B. Sahadevan	466	0.84%	
Margin of victory		2,101	3.77%	−17.84%
Turnout		55,682	58.36%	−12.13%
Registered electors		97,060		
DMK hold		Swing	-12.22%	

=== 1971 ===
1971 Tamil Nadu Legislative Assembly election: Thiruporur
Party	Candidate	Votes	%	±%
DMK	M Munu Adhi	40,187	57.00%	−3.03%
INC	T M Dhanapal	24,950	35.39%	0.60%
Independent	K Kuppan	4,223	5.99%	
Independent	Sagadevan B	706	1.00%	
Independent	P A Appadurai	441	0.63%	
Margin of victory		15,237	21.61%	−3.62%
Turnout		70,507	70.48%	−5.74%
Registered electors		1,04,099		
DMK hold		Swing	-3.03%	

=== 1967 ===
1967 Madras Legislative Assembly election: Thiruporur
Party	Candidate	Votes	%	±%
DMK	M. Adhi	39,047	60.03%	
INC	N. M. Manivarama	22,631	34.79%	
Independent	Bupathy	2,039	3.13%	
Independent	Sahadevan	1,334	2.05%	
Margin of victory		16,416	25.24%	
Turnout		65,051	76.23%	
Registered electors		88,914		
DMK hold		Swing		

=== 1952 ===
1952 Madras Legislative Assembly election: Thiruporur
Party	Candidate	Votes	%	±%
INC	M. R. Ramachandran	9,580	37.47%	37.47%
RPI	S. Murugesa Mudaliar	4,527	17.70%	
KMPP	M. V. Ganapathi Nayakar	3,790	14.82%	
Independent	C. Deivasikhamani	3,644	14.25%	
Socialist Party (India)	T. K. Krishnaswami	2,731	10.68%	
Independent	C. M. Nagappan	1,298	5.08%	
Margin of victory		5,053	19.76%	
Turnout		25,570	37.88%	
Registered electors		67,495		
INC win (new seat)				
