= M. Dhanapal =

Indian politician

Member of Parliament, Rajya Sabha
- Incumbent
- Assumed office 25 July 2025
- Prime Minister: Narendra Modi
- Preceded by: N. Chandrasegharan
- Constituency: Tamil Nadu

Member of the Tamil Nadu Legislative Assembly
- In office 1 July 1991 – 13 May 1996
- Chief Minister: J. Jayalalithaa
- Preceded by: D. Thirumurthy
- Succeeded by: G. Chockalingam
- Constituency: Tirupporur

Personal details
- Party: All India Anna Dravida Munnetra Kazhagam
- Spouse: D. Gayathiri Dhanapal
- Occupation: Advocate

M. Dhanapal is an Indian politician and advocate. He is a member of Parliament, representing Tamil Nadu in the Rajya Sabha, the upper house of Parliament of India. He also served as member of the Tamil Nadu Legislative Assembly representing Thiruporur constituency from 1 July 1991 to 13 May 1996 as an All India Anna Dravida Munnetra Kazhagam candidate.

== Elections contested and positions held ==
=== Rajya Sabha elections ===
Elections	Constituency	Political party	Result
2025	Tamil Nadu	AIADMK	Won

=== Tamil Nadu Legislative Assembly elections ===
Elections	Assembly	Constituency	Political party	Result	Vote percentage	Opposition		
Elections	Assembly	Constituency	Political party	Result	Vote percentage	Candidate	Political party	Vote percentage
1991	10th	Tirupporur	AIADMK	Won	56.55%	G. Chockalingam	DMK	27.87%
2006	13th	Tirupporur	AIADMK	Lost	38.82%	D. Moorthy	PMK	45.07%

=== Positions in Parliament of the Republic of India ===
Elections	Position	Elected constituency	Term in office		
Elections	Position	Elected constituency	Assumed office	Left office	Time in office
2025	Member of Parliament, Rajya Sabha	Tamil Nadu	25 July 2025	Incumbent	256 days

=== Positions in Tamil Nadu Legislative Assembly ===
Elections	Position	Elected constituency	Term in office		
Elections	Position	Elected constituency	Assumed office	Left office	Time in office
1991	Member of the Legislative Assembly	Tirupporur	1 July 1991	13 May 1996	4 years, 317 days
