= S. Pugazhenthi =

Indian politician

Member, Tamil Nadu Legislative Assembly
- In office 2016–2021
- Preceded by: S. Kanitha Sampath
- Succeeded by: K. Maragatham
- Constituency: Maduranthakam

Personal details
- Born: 6 June 1972 Nellikuppam
- Party: Dravida Munnetra Kazhagam
- Profession: Farmer

S. Pugazhenthi is an Indian politician and former member of the Tamil Nadu Legislative Assembly. He is from Nellikuppam town in the Cuddalore district. Pugazhenthi holds a master's degree in arts. He belongs to the Dravida Munnetra Kazhagam (DMK) party. He contested and won the Maduranthakam Assembly constituency in the 2016 Tamil Nadu Legislative Assembly election, thus becoming a Member of the Legislative Assembly (MLA).

== Electoral performance ==
=== 2016 ===
2016 Tamil Nadu Legislative Assembly election: Maduranthakam
Party	Candidate	Votes	%	±%
DMK	S. Pugazhenthi	73,693	41.43%	New
AIADMK	C. K. Thamizharasan	70,736	39.77%	−13.88
PMK	E. Adhikesavan	16,215	9.12%	New
DMDK	M. Thennarasu	11,773	6.62%	New
NOTA	NOTA	1,525	0.86%	New
Margin of victory		2,957	1.66%	−10.86%
Turnout		177,879	81.29%	−0.57%
Registered electors		218,831		
DMK gain from AIADMK		Swing	-12.22%	
