= G. Chockalingam =

Indian politician (?–2000)

G. Chockalingam (died 20 April 2000), was an Indian politician and a Member of the Legislative Assembly. He was elected to the Tamil Nadu legislative assembly as a Dravida Munnetra Kazhagam (DMK) candidate from Tirupporur constituency in the 1996 election. The constituency was reserved for candidates from the Scheduled Castes. He had also been elected from the constituency in 1977 and 1980.

Chockalingam had a wife, with whom he had three sons and two daughters. He died on 20 April 2000, aged 63.
