= B. Vijayaraj =

Indian politician (born 1994)

Member of the Tamil Nadu Legislative Assembly
- Incumbent
- Assumed office 2026
- Constituency: Thiruporur

Personal details
- Born: 1994 (age 31–32) Chengalpattu, Tamil Nadu, India
- Education: Saraswati Arts and Science College; SRM Institute of Science and Technology
- Occupation: Lawyer; politician

Balakrishnan Vijayaraj (born 1994) is an Indian politician from Tamil Nadu. He is a member of the Tamil Nadu Legislative Assembly from Thiruporur Assembly constituency in Chengalpattu district representing Tamilaga Vettri Kazhagam.

Vijayaraj is from Chengalpattu, Tamil Nadu. He is the son of M.P. Balakrishnan. He did his schooling at Anandavalli Marticulation Higher Secondary School and passed Class 12 in 2012. He did his B.A. in history at Saraswati Arts and Science College, Tindivanam. Later, he completed LLB. (honours) at SRM Institute of Science and Technology in 2018. He is a lawyer and his wife is a homeopathy doctor. He declared assets worth Rs.59 lakhs in his affidavit to the Election Commission of India.

== Career ==
Vijayaraj became an MLA for the first time winning the 2026 Tamil Nadu Legislative Assembly election from Thiruporur Assembly constituency representing Tamilaga Vettri Kazhagam. He polled 1,10,095 votes and defeated his nearest rival, Panneer Doss of the Viduthalai Chiruthaigal Katchi, by a margin of 39,351 votes.
