= Thiruporur Kandaswamy temple =

Hindu temple in Tamil Nadu, India

Sri Kandaswamy Temple
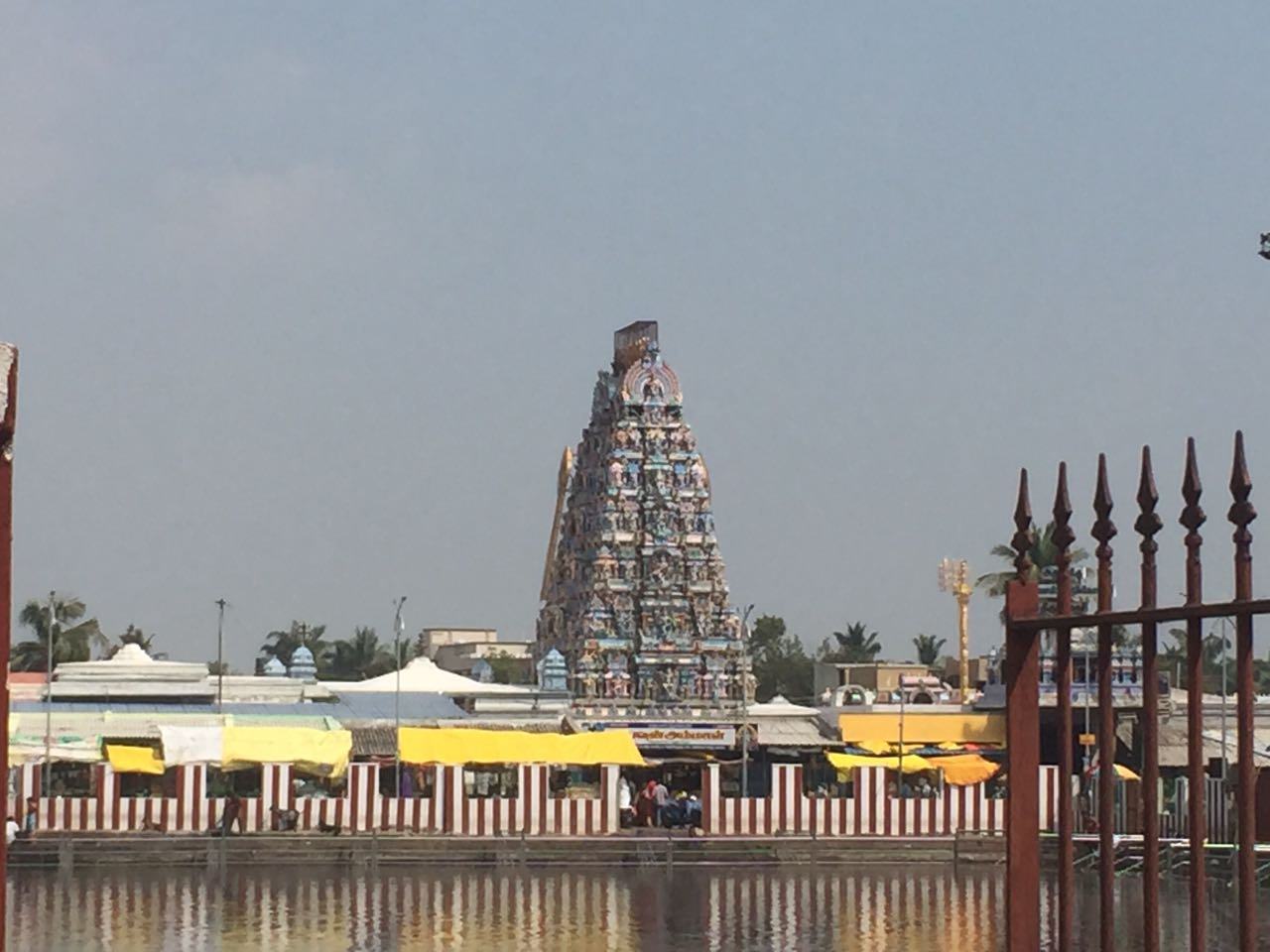

- Location in Tamil Nadu

Religion
- Affiliation: Hinduism
- District: Chengalpattu
- Deity: Kandaswamy (Murugan)

Location
- Location: Thiruporur
- State: Tamil Nadu
- Country: India
- Coordinates: 12°43′31″N 80°11′20″E

Architecture
- Type: Dravidian architecture, Rock cut

Website
- thiruporurmurugantemple.tnhrce.in

Thiruporur Kandaswamy temple (or Thiruporur Murugan temple or Kanthaswamy temple) in Thiruporur, a panchayat town in Chengalpattu district in the South Indian state of Tamil Nadu, is dedicated to the Hindu god Murugan. Constructed in the Tamil Hindu style of architecture, the temple is believed to have been expanded during the 18th century with the images excavated from Thiruporur.

The temple has a five-tiered gateway tower leading to a pillared halls and the sanctum. The temple is open from 6:30 am – 12:30 pm and 3.30 - 8 pm. Four daily rituals and many yearly festivals are held at the temple, of which the Vaikasi Visagam celebrated during the Tamil month of Vaikasi (May - June), Kanthasasti festival and Navarathri festival being the most prominent. The temple is maintained and administered by the Hindu Religious and Endowment Board of the Government of Tamil Nadu.

== Legend ==
As per Hindu legend, Murugan fought with demons in three places, namely, the sea at Tiruchendur, land at Thirupparankundram and in air at Thiruporur. It is believed that sage Agastya on his way to Pothigai hills visited this place. Since Muruga won over Tharuka asuran, this place came to be Porur (por in Tamil means war) and also called by other names like Tharukapuri and Samarapuri. According to the sthala puraanam, at some point of time, the place was submerged in a deluge. A sage named Chidambara Adigal was residing in Madurai and a divine voice asked him to unearth the statue under a palm tree. He dug out the statue and built a temple around it. There is a separate shrine dedicated to him in the temple and he is given special respect during the Vaikasi Visagam festival. During the last event of the festival, he is depicted merging with the presiding deity.

== History ==
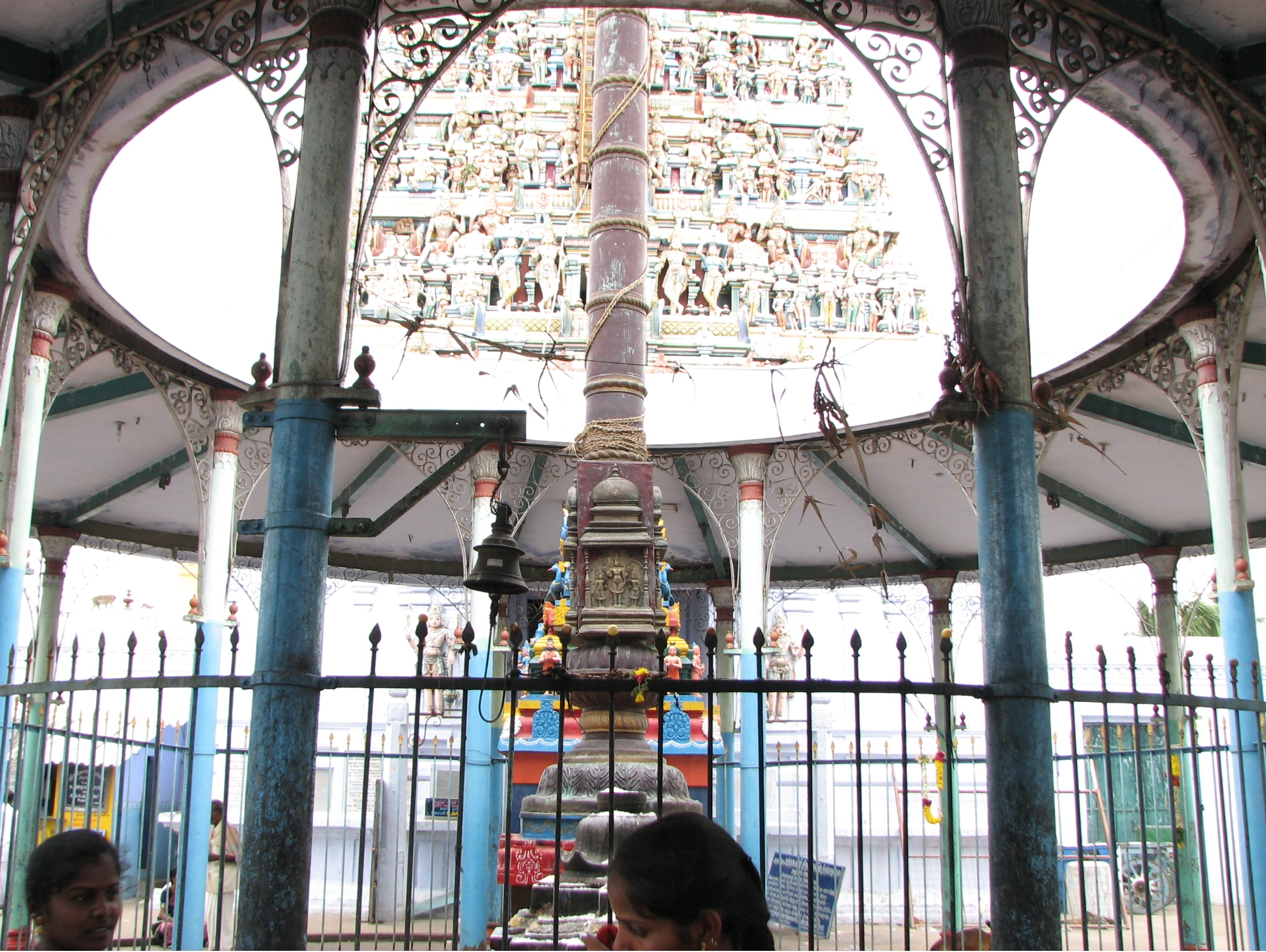
Flag pole at the temple

The temple is believed to have been built during the Pallava era in the 10th century CE. Chidambara Swamigal, believed to be a descendant of the Sangam age poets, rebuilt the temple during the 17th century. An effort was made to dig up a room in the temple by archaeologists during 2013, which yielded only items used during rituals and not any archaeological artifact. During 2013, as many as 36 acres (15 ha) belonging to the temple located at Thandalam that was leased earlier, was recovered from the land grabbers. The recovered land was valued at ₹100 crores. In modern times, the temple is maintained and administered by the Hindu religious and charitable endowments Board of the Government of Tamil Nadu.

== Architecture ==
The temple is located in Thiruporur, in Old Mahabalipuram Road, 28 km (17 mi) from Chennai, the capital of Tamil Nadu. The temple has a five-tiered rajagopuram, the gateway tower, raising to a height of 70 ft (21 m) and 200 ft (61 m) wide. The temple covers an area of 4 acres (16,000 m^{2}). The sanctum of the temple is approached through a 24 pillared hall near the gateway tower. The temple tank is located outside the temple. The sanctum is built with granite, which houses the image of Murugan in the form of Kandaswamy in standing posture. The sanctum faces East and the image of the presiding deity is 7 ft (2.1 m) tall. The image is sported with two hands with one of them holding Vel (divine spear), and an image of peacock besides the presiding deity. There are separate shrines of his consorts Valli and Deivaanai around the first precinct. There is a separate shrine for Shiva and Parvathi and all the Parsvatah Devatas (attendant deities) associated with Shiva temples.

== Religious significance ==
Kandaswamy is revered by Chidambara Swamigal in 726 verses. The image of Muruga is believed to have been discovered under a palm leaf. There is a palm leaf maintained in the temple, which is believed to have been the original palm leaf. Aruna giri naadhar, a 16th-century saint has glorified the temple in his work in Thiru pugazh. He has mentioned that Shiva is the head of all Vedas, the sacred texts. Bala deva raya has mentioned Kandaswamy, as "Samara puri vaazh Shan mugatthu arase" in his works in Kanda Shasti Kavasam.

== Festivals and religious practises ==
The image of Kandaswamy is believed to have originated on its own and hence ablution is not done to the presiding deity as with the other temples. There is an yantra over a Tortoise base where all the rituals are performed. The temple is open from 5:30 am – 12:30 pm and 3:30 pm – 8:30 pm on all days except during festive occasions when it has extended timings. The temple priests perform the pooja (rituals) during festivals and on a daily basis. There are weekly, monthly and fortnightly rituals performed in the temple. The four major rituals in the day include

- Kaalai sandhi at 9 a.m.,
- Ucchi kaala Pooja at 12 p.m.,
- Saaya ratchai at 5:30 p.m. and
- Raakkaalam at 8 p.m.

The major festivals of the temple include Vaigaasi Visaagam celebrated during the Tamil month of Vaigaasi (May–June), Maasi Bramorchavam during "Maasi" Month (March), Paalkudam / Paal Kaavadi Festival (Milk Pot) on Pongal (Tamil Harvesting festival), Kandha shashti festival and Nava rathri during Aippasi (October–November).

== Gallery ==
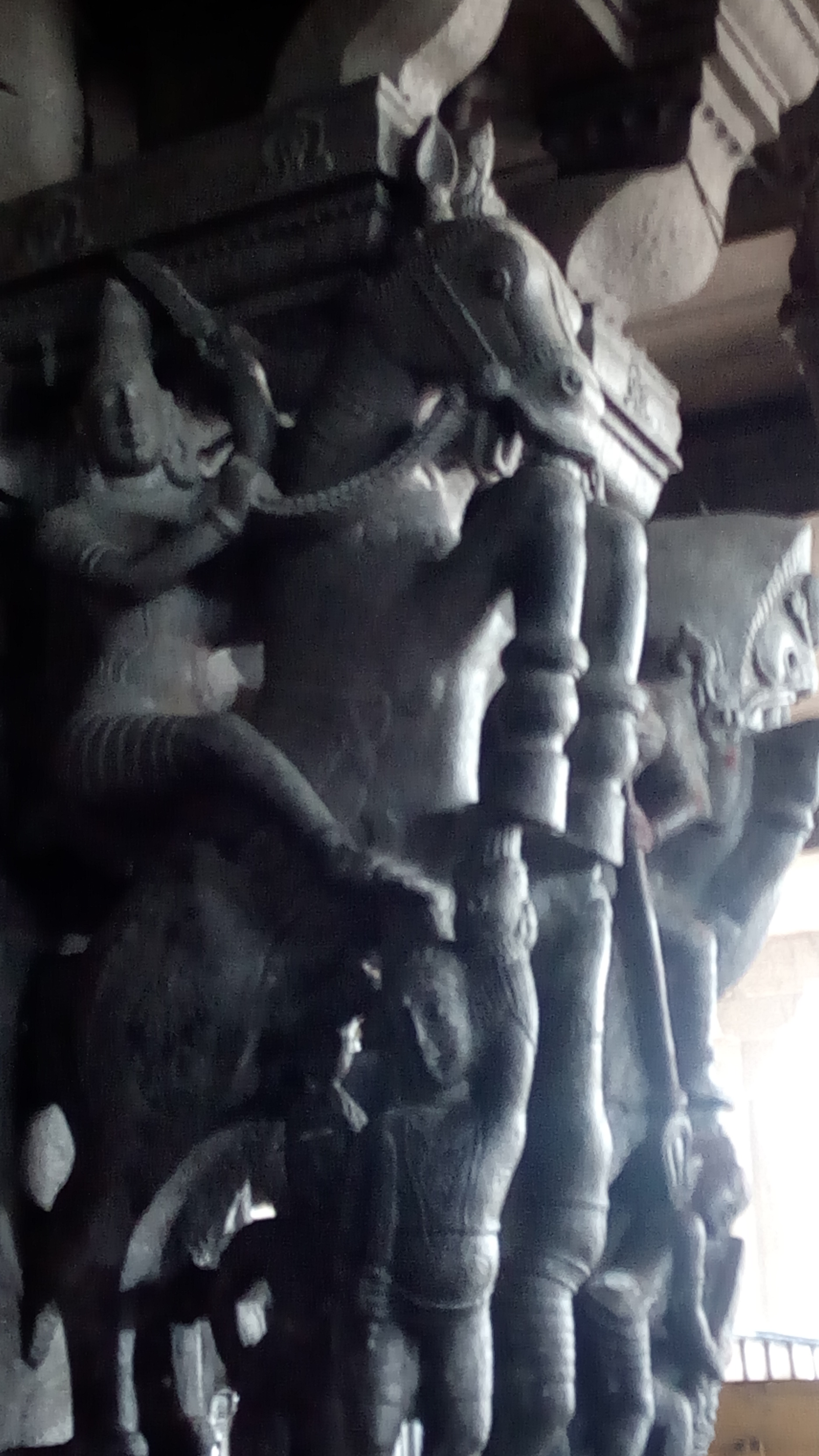
Thiruporur sculpture pallavas

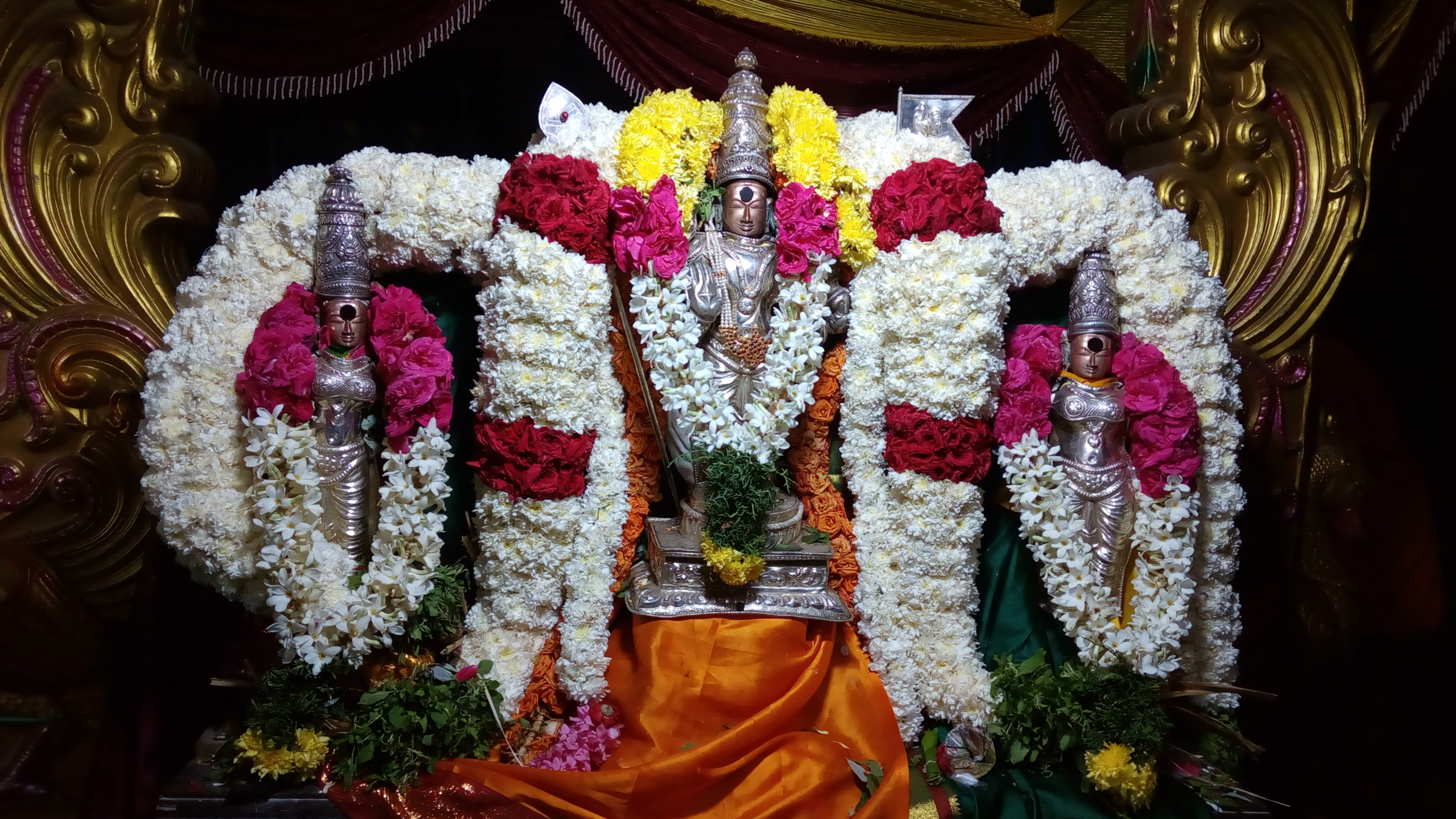
Lord Kandaswamy during Sashti

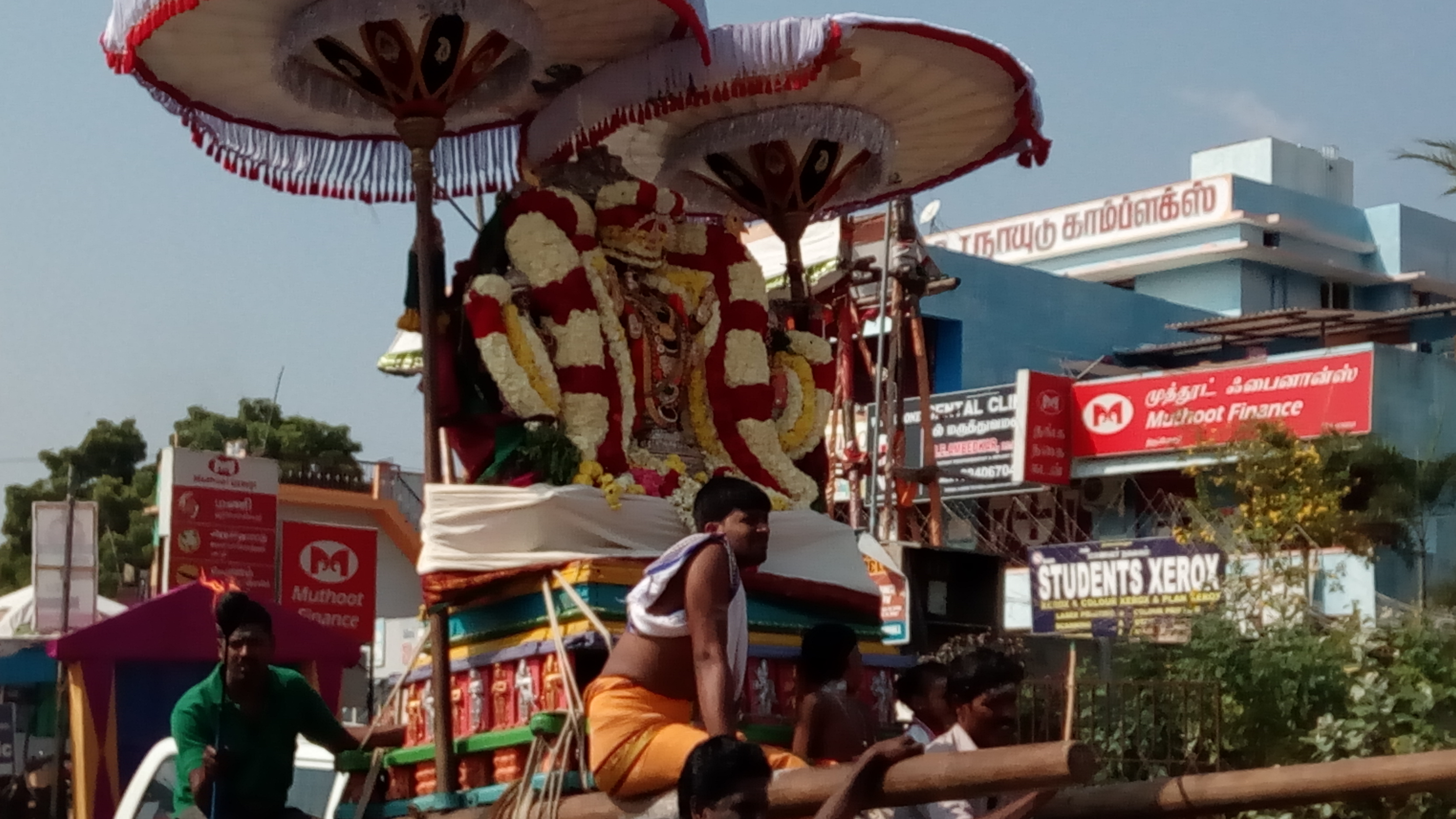
Urchavar Veedhi Ula

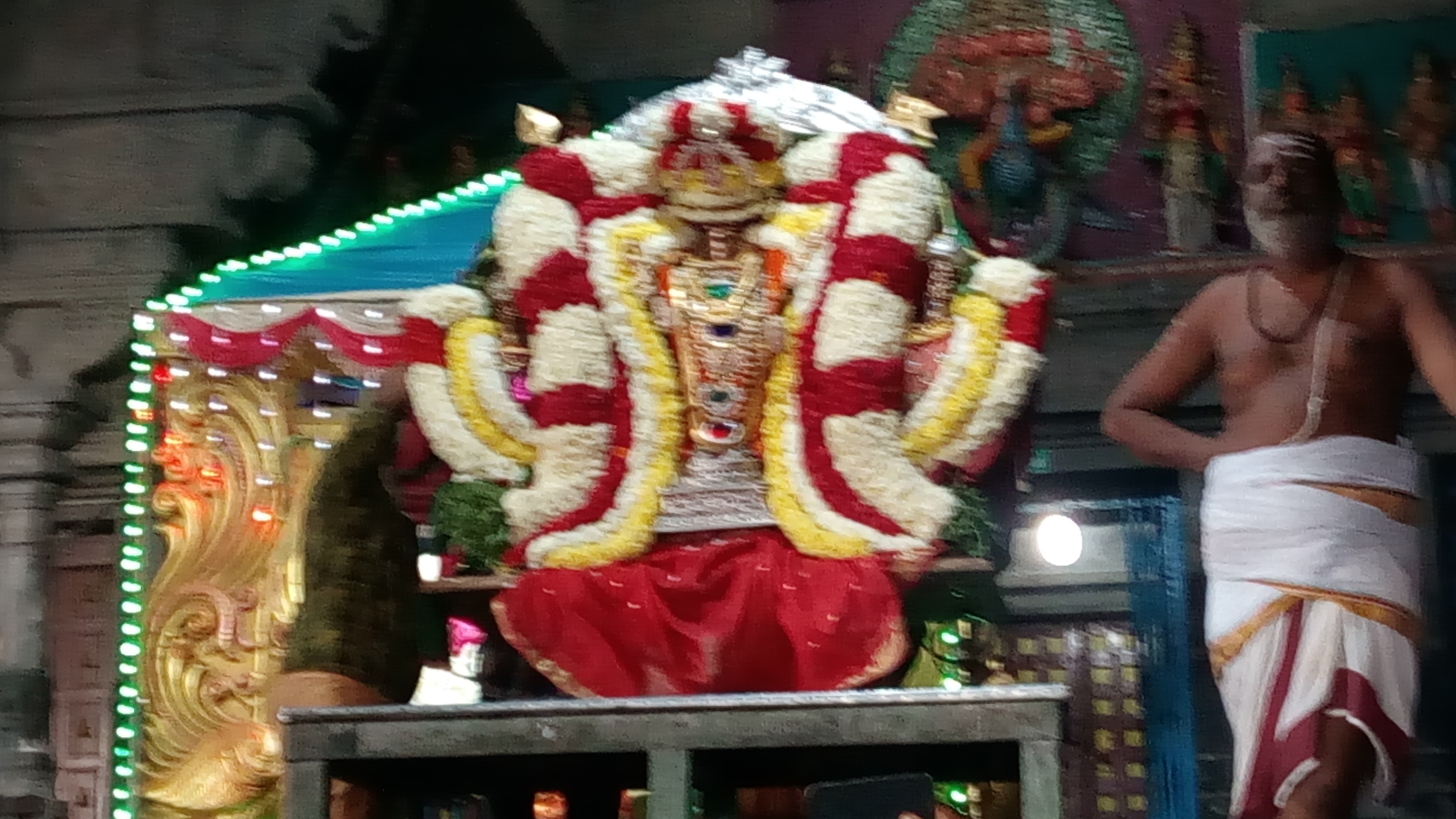
Thiruporur Kandasamy urchavar

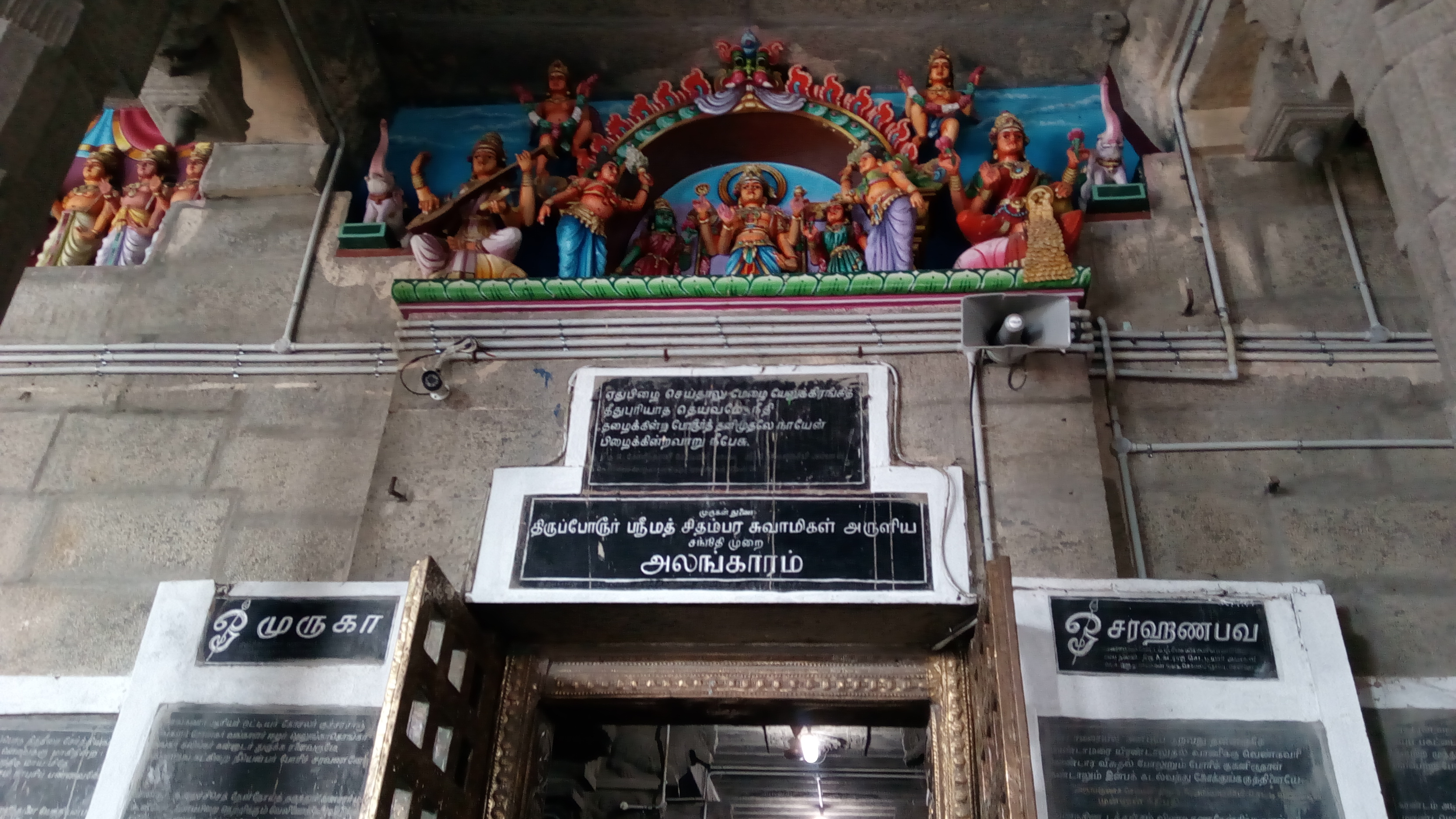
Sactum Santorium Entrance thiruporur

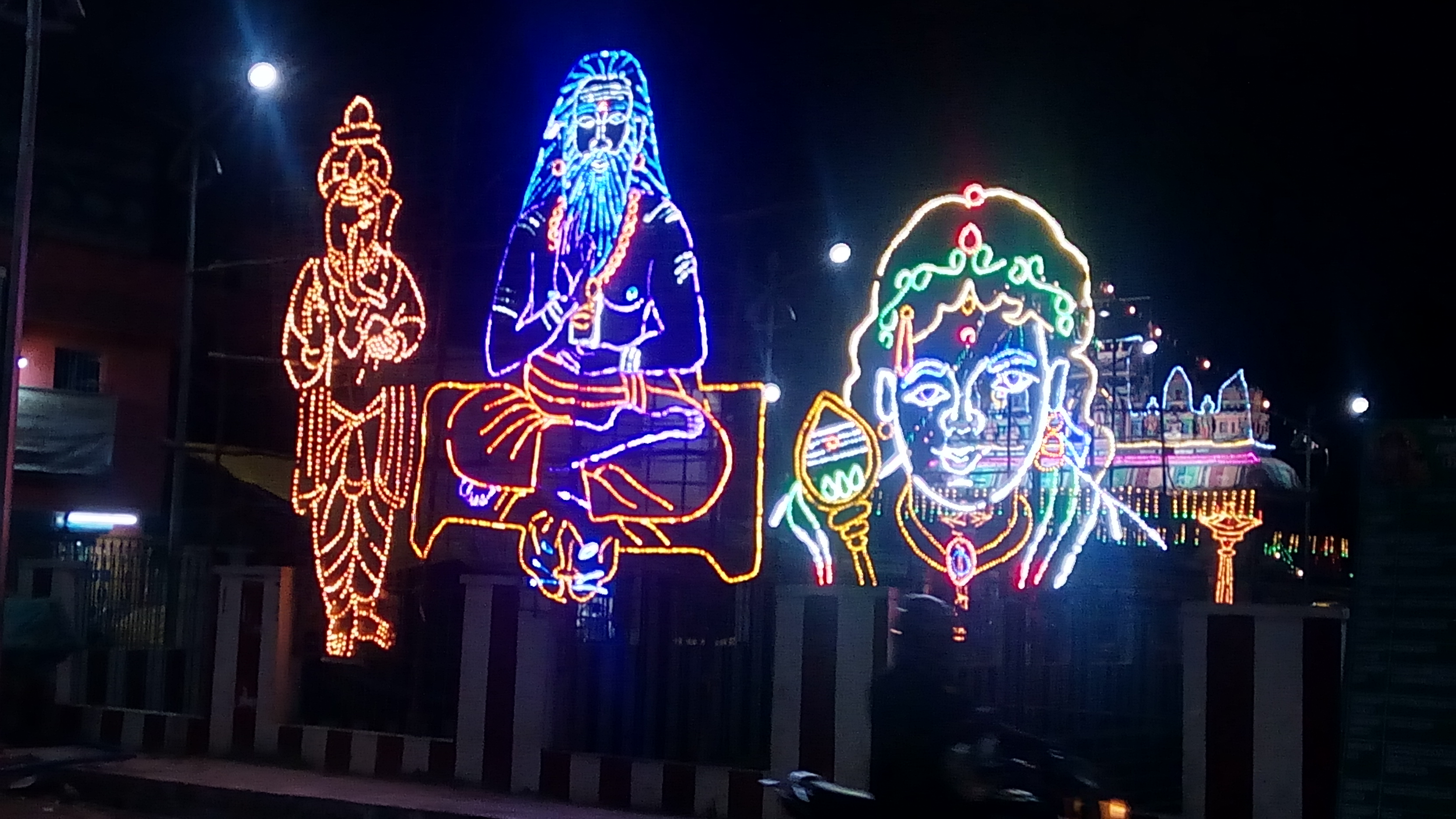
Maasi Bhramorchavam

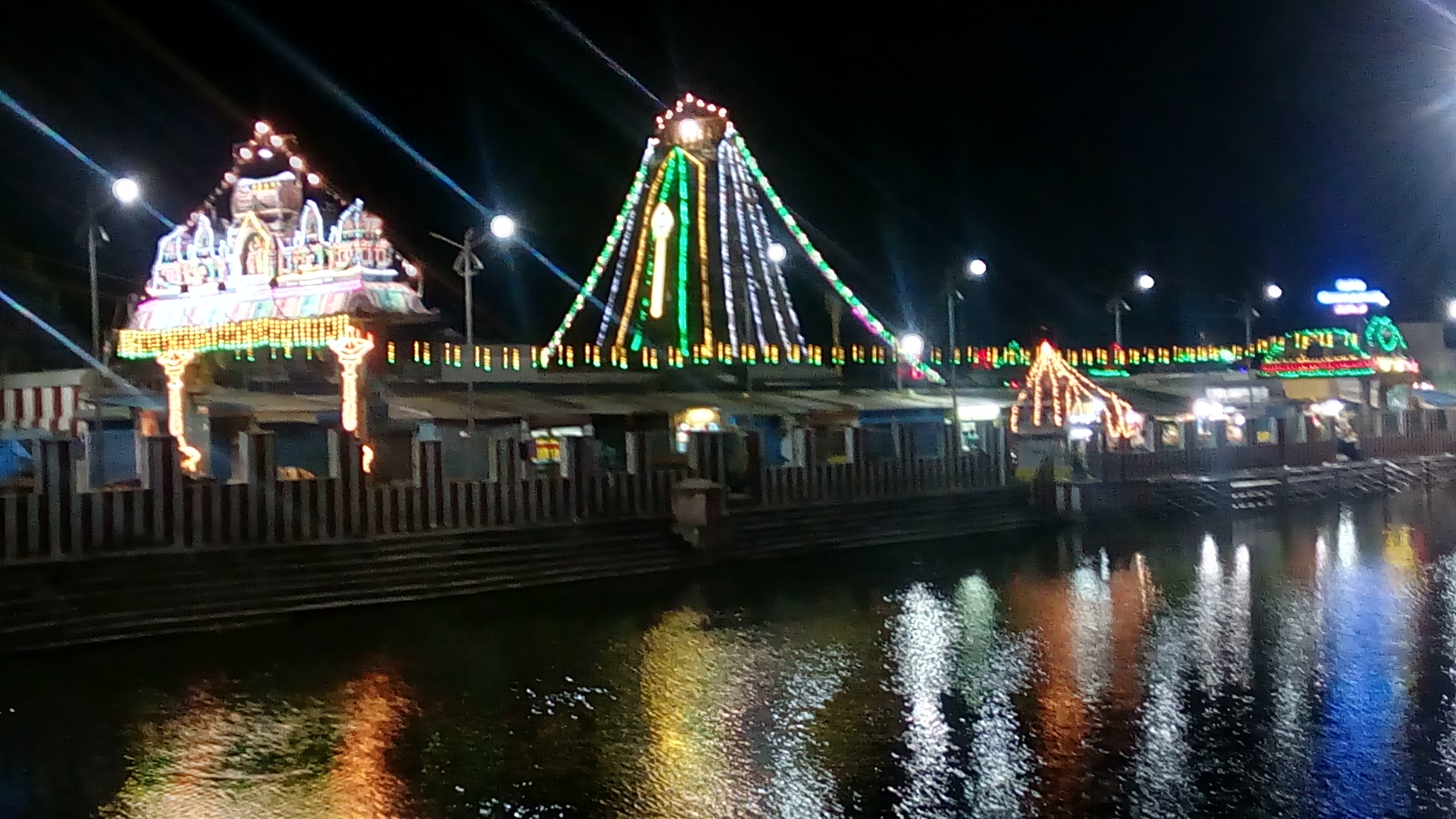
Maasi Bhramorchavam

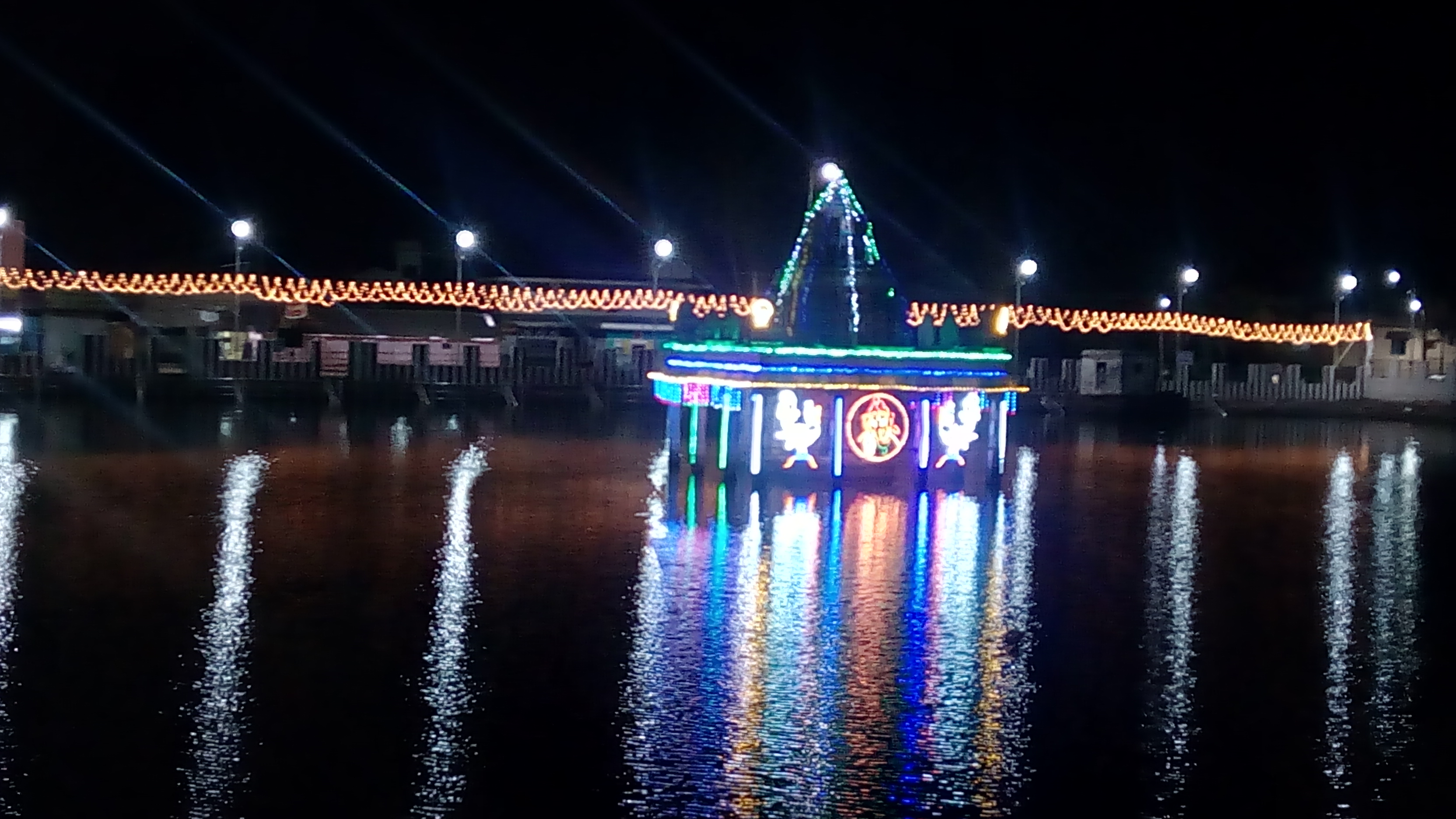
Maasi Bhramorchavam - Tank lighting

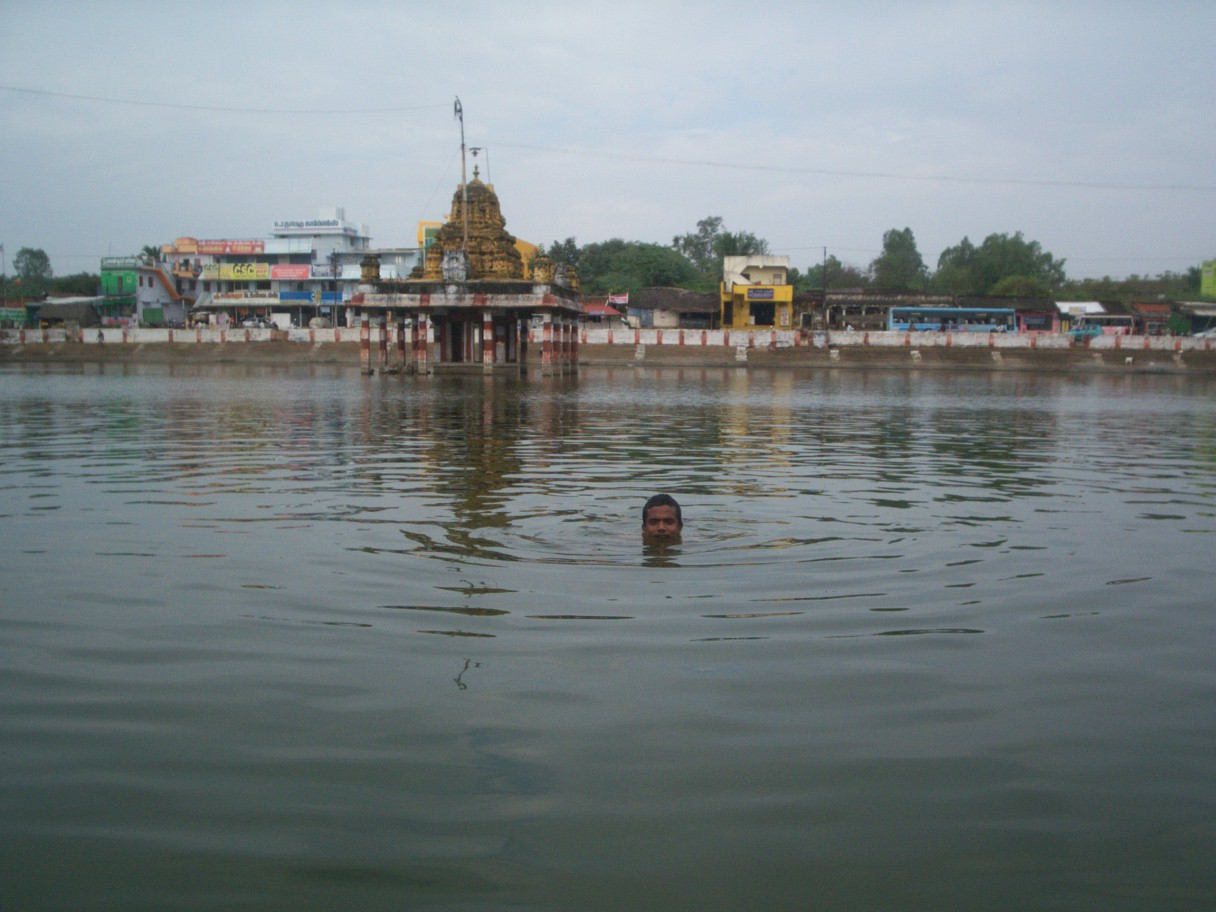
The temple tank, located opposite to the temple

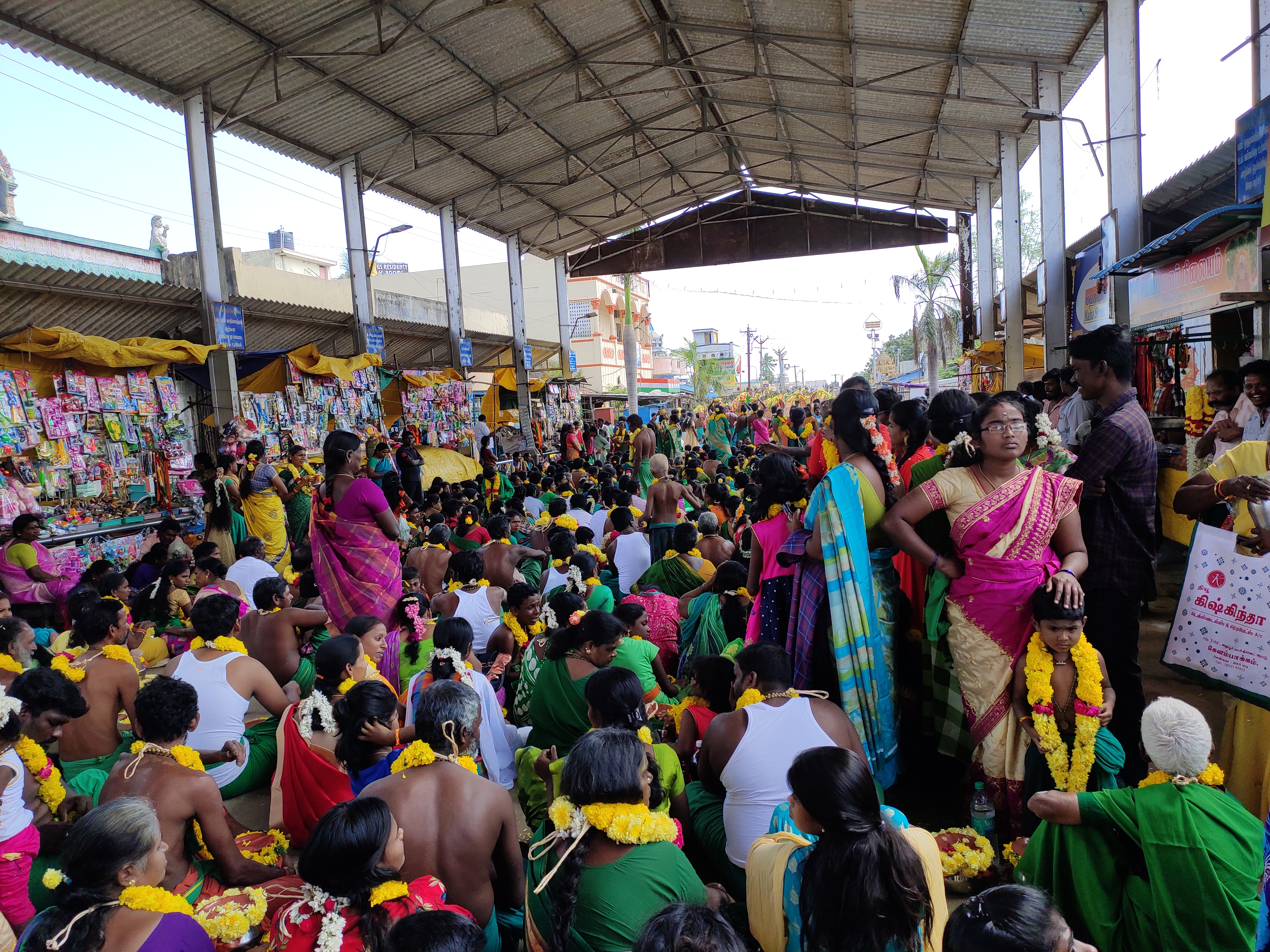
Devotees awaiting to start palkudam Jan 2020

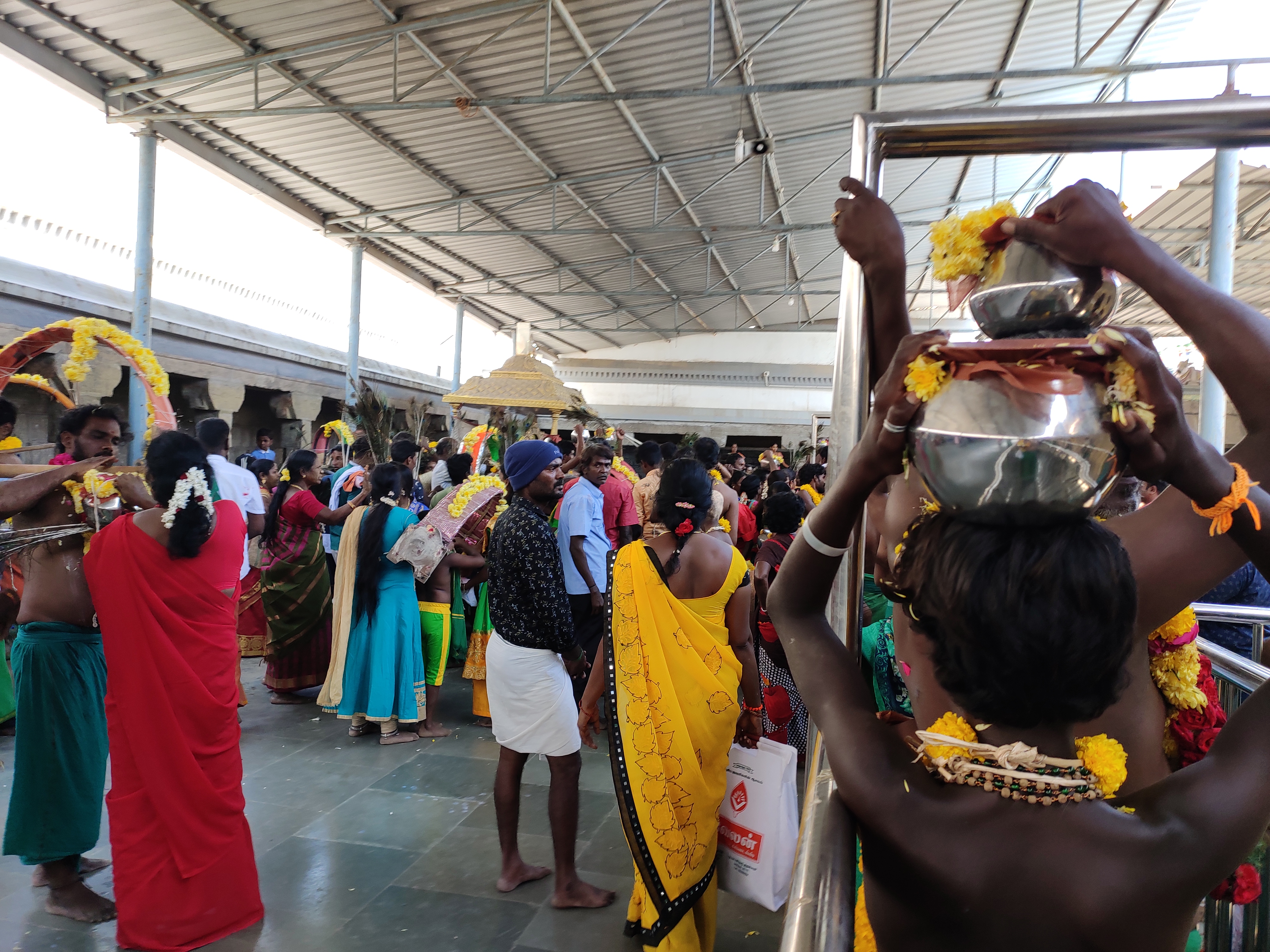
Palkudam by devotees

== Controversy ==
- A devotee in Tamil Nadu realised that his iPhone inadvertently slipped into the hundial while he was making a donation at Arulmigu Kandaswamy temple. The temple authorities refused to return it, Tamil Nadu minister PK Sekar Babu states items in 'hundi' become deity's property. They offered him the SIM card and access to the data, but the devotee pleaded for the phone's return, leaving its fate in the temple's hands.

== See also ==
- Religion in Chennai
- Heritage structures in Chennai
