= K. P. Kandan =

Indian politician

K. P. Kandan (born 30 November 1963) is an Indian politician and was a member of the 14th Tamil Nadu Legislative Assembly from the Sholinganallur constituency. He represented the All India Anna Dravida Munnetra Kazhagam (AIADMK) party.

The elections of 2016 resulted in his constituency being won by S. Aravind Ramesh of the Dravida Munnetra Kazhagam. Kandan was one of thirteen AIADMK MLAs in the Greater Chennai area who were deselected by the party, apparently in an attempt to thwart a potential anti-incumbency backlash from the electorate following the recent flooding. It was felt that fresh faces would put some distance between the past and the present.

In September 2016, Kandan was put forward as an AIADMK candidate for the Chennai Corporation elections.

== Personal life ==
Kandan was born in Chennai on 30 November 1963. He is married.
