= N. Chandrasegharan =

Indian politician from Tamilnadu

Member of Parliament, Rajya Sabha
- In office 25 July 2019 – 24 July 2025
- Preceded by: V. Maitreyan
- Succeeded by: M. Dhanapal
- Constituency: Tamil Nadu

Personal details
- Party: All India Anna Dravida Munnetra Kazhagam

N. Chandrasegharan (born 2 January 1955) is an Indian politician from Tamilnadu. N Chandrasegharan belongs to the All India Anna Dravida Munnetra Kazhagam party. He was elected as the Member of Parliament in 2019. Chandrasegharan belongs to the Arundathiyar community that is defined as Scheduled Casts (SC) in India.
