= S. K. Venkatesan =

Indian politician (died 2021)

Sri.S. K. Venkatesan was elected to the Tamil Nadu Legislative Assembly from the Maduranthakam constituency in the 1996 elections. He was a candidate of the Dravida Munnetra Kazhagam (DMK) party. He died on 29 August 2021, due to health-related issues.
