= L. Idhayavarman =

Indian politician

L. Idhayavarman is an Indian politician and is Member of the Legislative Assembly of Tamil Nadu. He was elected to the Tamil Nadu legislative assembly as a Dravida Munnetra Kazhagam candidate from Tirupporur constituency in the by-election in 2019.
