= S. Aravind Ramesh =

Indian politician

Member of the Tamil Nadu Legislative Assembly
- In office 19 May 2016 – 4 May 2026
- Constituency: Sholinganallur

Personal details
- Party: Dravida Munnetra Kazhagam
- Spouse: R Amudha Priya
- Children: 1 Son & 1 Daughter

S. Aravind Ramesh is an Indian politician and a Member of the Legislative Assembly of Tamil Nadu. He was elected to the Tamil Nadu legislative assembly from Sholinganallur as a Dravida Munnetra Kazhagam (DMK) candidate in 2016.

== Electoral performance ==
2021 Tamil Nadu Legislative Assembly election: Shozhinganallur
Party	Candidate	Votes	%	±%
DMK	S. Aravind Ramesh	171,558	44.18	+1.65
AIADMK	K. P. Kandan	136,153	35.06	−3.15
NTK	S. Michael	38,872	10.01	+6.87
MNM	Rajiv Kumar	30,284	7.80	New
DMDK	R. Murugan	3,912	1.01	New
NOTA	NOTA	3,030	0.78	−1.34
Margin of victory		35,405	9.12	4.80
Turnout		388,355	55.57	−1.81
Rejected ballots		552	0.14	
Registered electors		698,820		
DMK hold		Swing	1.65	

2016 Tamil Nadu Legislative Assembly election: Shozhinganallur
Party	Candidate	Votes	%	±%
DMK	S. Aravind Ramesh	147,014	42.53	New
AIADMK	N. Sundaram	132,101	38.21	−22.22
PMK	K. Ramkumar	15,595	4.51	New
VCK	R. Paneer Doss	15,129	4.38	New
BJP	Ujagar Singh	14,915	4.31	+1.29
NTK	S. Rajan	10,842	3.14	New
NOTA	NOTA	7,332	2.12	New
Margin of victory		14,913	4.31	−23.52
Turnout		345,697	57.38	−9.89
Registered electors		602,472		
DMK gain from AIADMK		Swing	-17.90	
