= M. Kothandapani =

Indian politician

M. Kothandapani was an Indian politician and former Member of the Legislative Assembly of Tamil Nadu. He was elected to the Tamil Nadu legislative assembly as an All India Anna Dravida Munnetra Kazhagam candidate from Tirupporur constituency in the 2016.

He was one of the 18 members who were disqualified were disqualified by Speaker P. Dhanapal as they withdrew support to Chief Minister Edappadi K. Palaniswami and became loyal to rebel leader T.T.V. Dhinakaran and joined his party Amma Makkal Munnetra Kazhagam.
