= S. Kanitha Sampath =

Indian politician

S. Kanitha Sampath (born 5 November 1965) is an Indian politician and was a member of the 12th and 14th Tamil Nadu Legislative Assemblies from the Tirupporur and Madurantakam constituencies, respectively, which are reserved for candidates from the Scheduled Castes. She represented the All India Anna Dravida Munnetra Kazhagam party.

The elections of 2016 resulted in her constituency being won by S. Pugazhenthi.

Sampath was born in Tiruvannamalai on 5 November 1965. She is married and has three children.
