= Thiruporur =

- Panchayat town
- Thiruporur, Tamil Nadu, India
- Coordinates: 12.7304°N 80.1890°E
- Country: India
- State: Tamil Nadu
- District: Chengalpattu

Area
  - Total: 20.16 km^{2} (7.78 sq mi)
- Elevation: 53 m (174 ft)

Population (2011)
  - Total: 13,666
  - Density: 677.9/km^{2} (1,756/sq mi)

Languages
  - Official: Tamil
- Time zone: UTC+5:30 (IST)
- PIN: 603110
- Telephone code: 91-44
- Vehicle registration: TN-19

Thiruporur is a panchayat town in Chengalpattu district in the Indian state of Tamil Nadu. The Thiruporur Kandaswamy temple is situated in the center of the town. There is a large temple tank in the vicinity of the temple. Thiruporur is located on Old Mahabalipuram Road and is flanked by Kelambakkam on one side and Alathur Pharmaceutical Industrial Estate on the other side, both of which are also on Old Mahabalipuram Road.

== Demographics ==
As of 2001 India census, Thiruporur had a population of 13,666. Males constitute 50% of the population and females 50%. Thiruporur has an average literacy rate of 70%, higher than the national average of 59.5%: male literacy is 77%, and female literacy is 63%. In Thiruporur, 13% of the population is under 6 years of age.

== Politics ==
Thiruporur Assembly Constituency is part of Kancheepuram (Lok Sabha constituency).

== Gallery ==
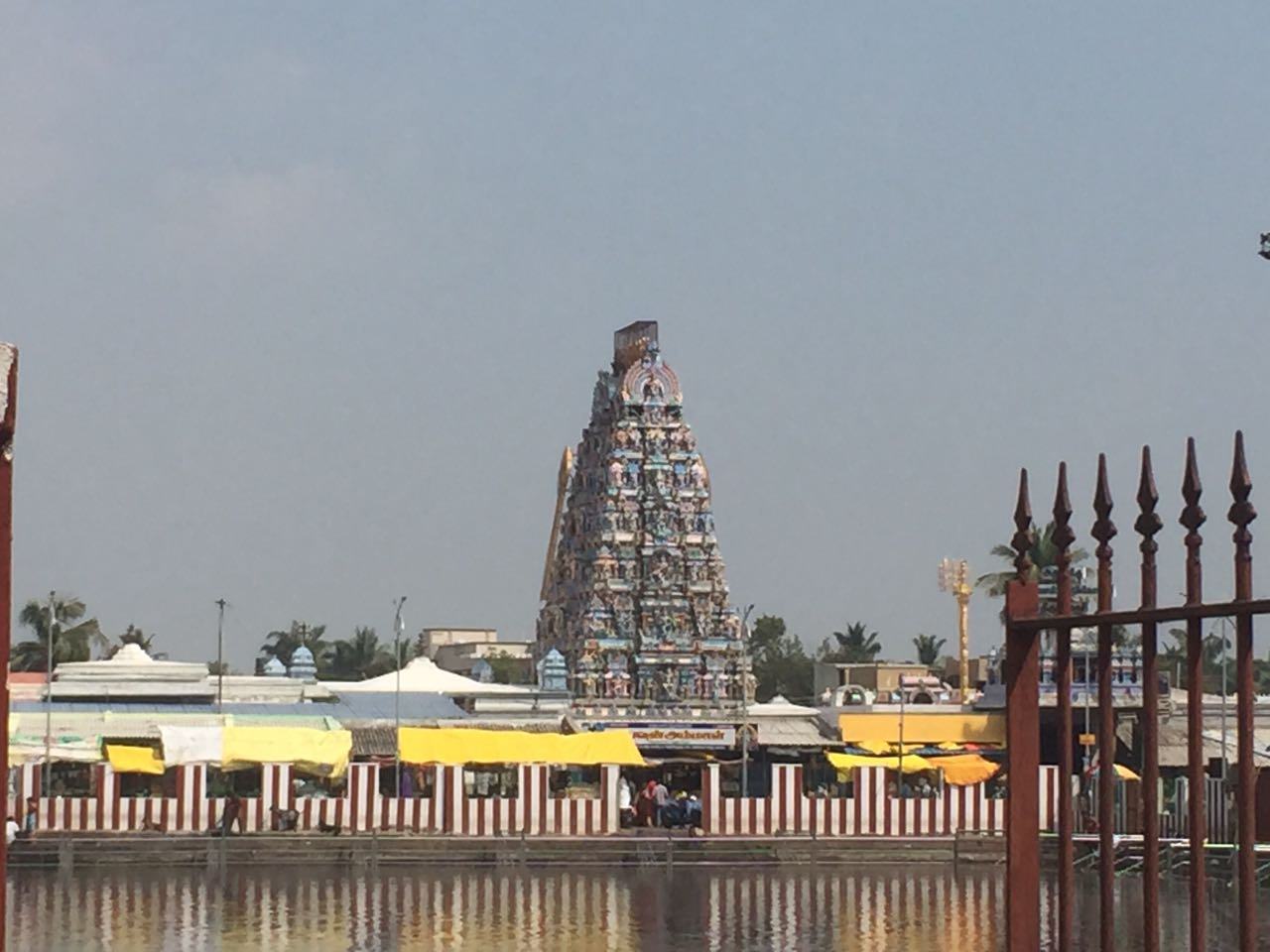
Thiruporur Kandhaswamy Temple

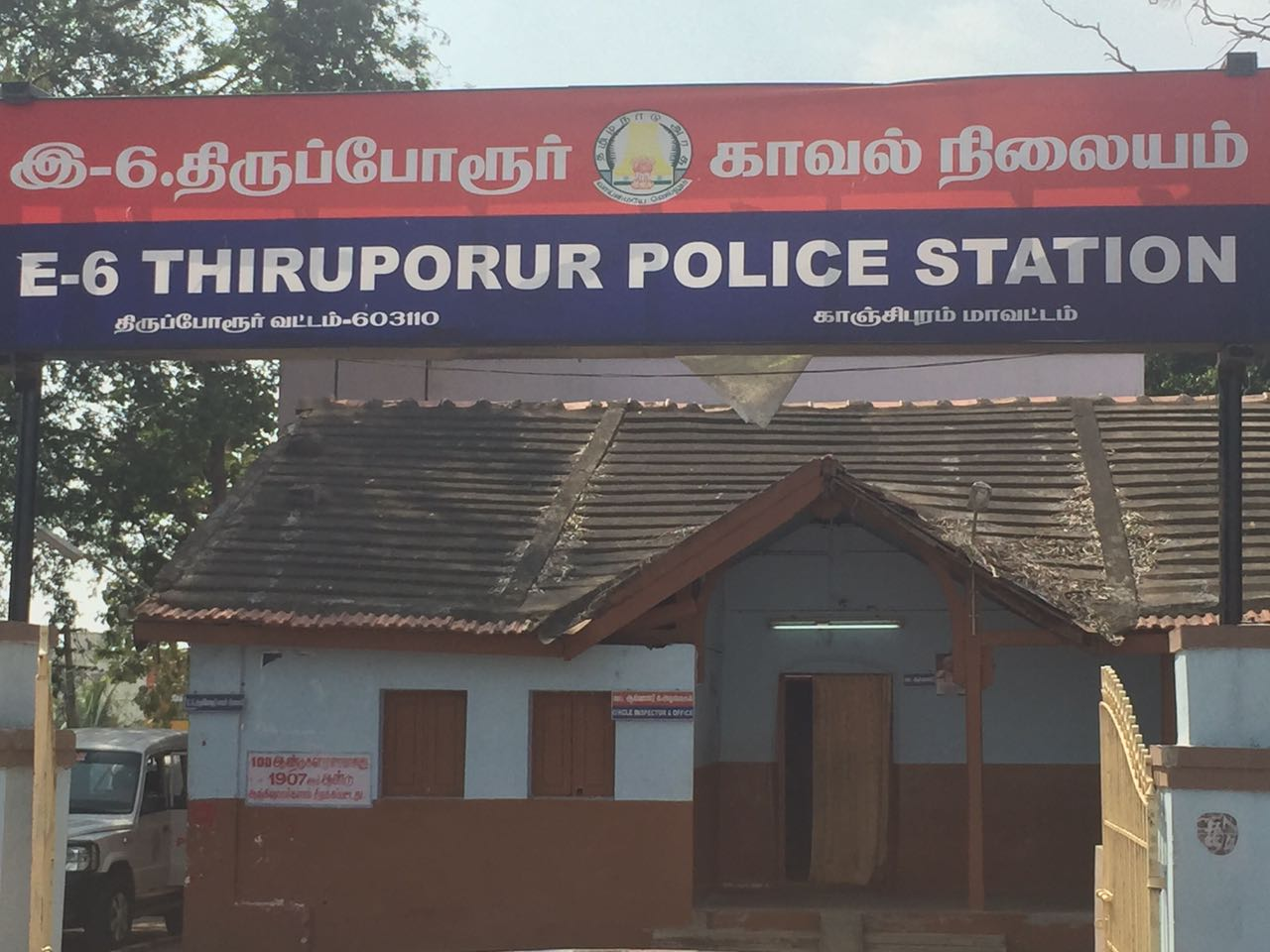
Thiruporur police station E-6

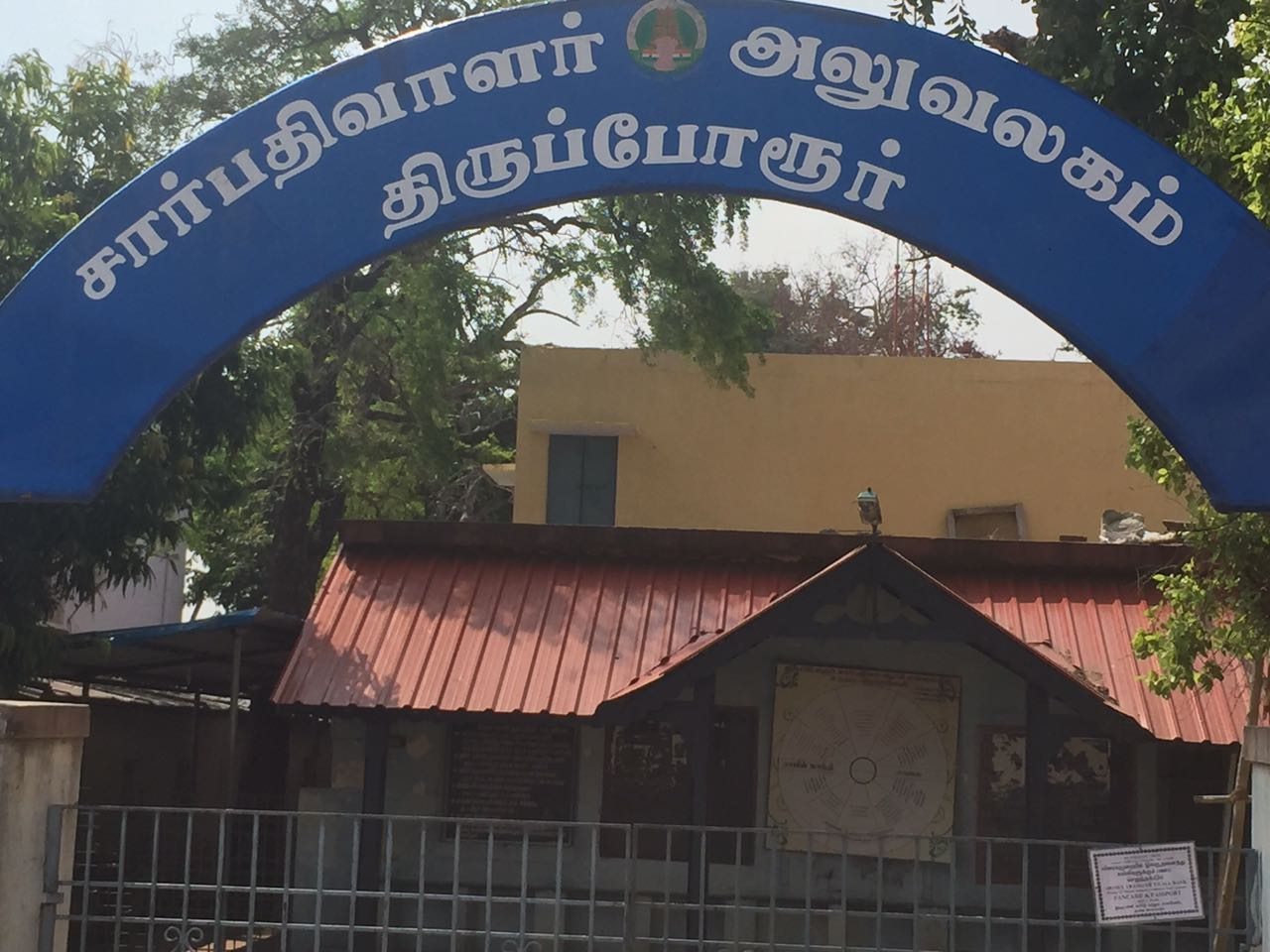
Thiruporur sub registrar office
