= 2026 Tamil Nadu Legislative Assembly election =

Indian election

- 23 April 2026

All 234 elected seats in the Tamil Nadu Legislative Assembly 118 seats needed for a majority
- Opinion polls
- Registered: 57,343,291 (▼8.9%)
- Turnout: 85.1% (▲11.47%)
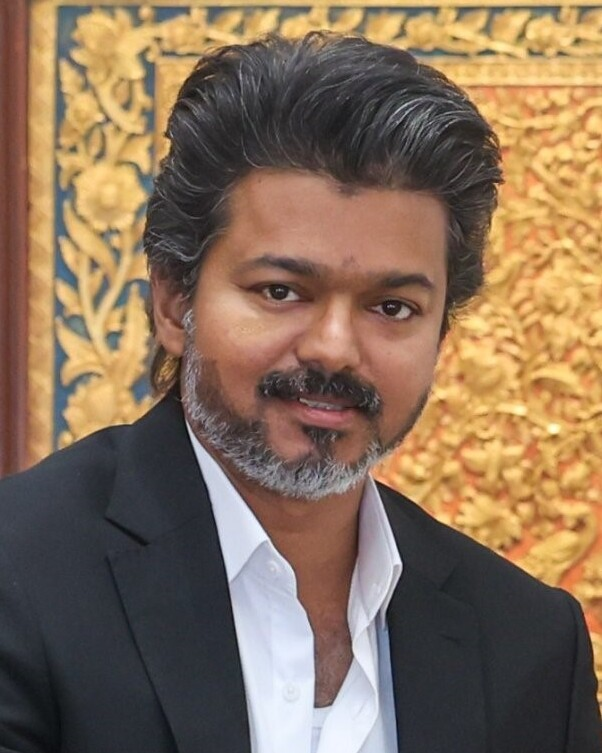

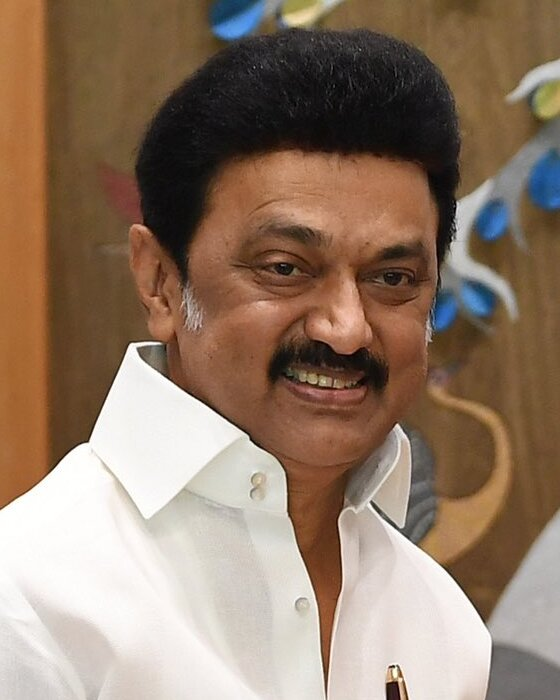

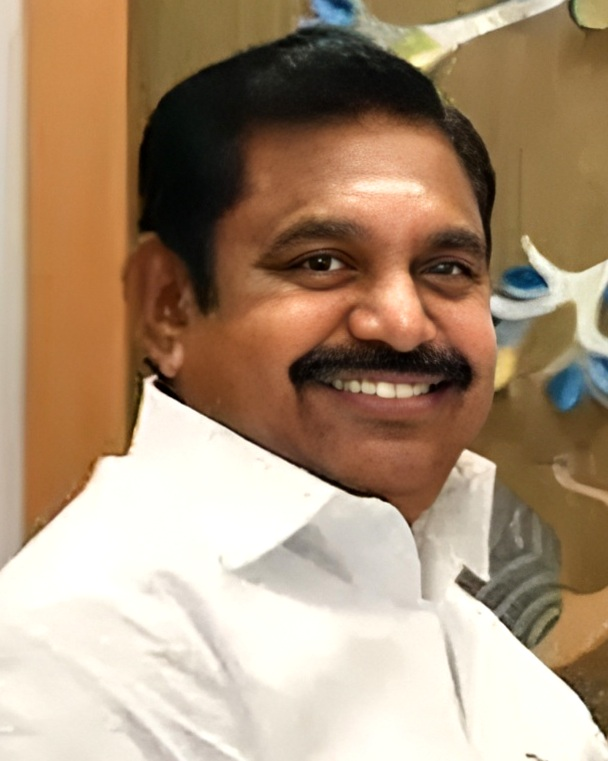
	Majority party	Minority party	Third party
Leader	C. Joseph Vijay	M. K. Stalin	Edappadi K. Palaniswami
Party	TVK	DMK	AIADMK
Alliance		SPA	AIADMK+
Leader since	2024	2018	2017
Leader's seat	Perambur (won, retained); Trichy East (won, vacated)	Kolathur (lost)	Edappadi (won)
Last election	New Party	37.7%, 133 seats	33.29%, 66 seats
Seats before	New	133	60
Seats won	108	59	47
Seat change	New	▼74	▼19
party vote	17,226,209	11,926,144	10,462,146
Percentage	34.92%	24.19%	21.21%
Swing	New	▼13.51%	▼12.08%
Alliance seats	108	73	53
Alliance seat change	N/A	▼86	▼22
Alliance popular vote	17,277,032	15,482,782	13,425,260
Alliance percentage	35.02%	31.40%	27.21%

Chief Minister before election
M. K. Stalin
DMK
Elected Chief Minister
C. Joseph Vijay
TVK

Elections to appoint the 234 members of the 17th Tamil Nadu Legislative Assembly, the highest body of the Government of Tamil Nadu, were held on 23 April 2026. The results were declared on 4 May 2026 by the Election Commission of India. It recorded the highest voter turnout in the state's history (85.1%). The new party Tamilaga Vettri Kazhagam (TVK), founded by Tamil actor C. Joseph Vijay, won in its first-ever election and ended a 59-year streak of dominance of Dravidian parties in the state.

The TVK contested alone in 233 constituencies. (Note: Though Tamilaga Vettri Kazhagam announced candidates for all the 234 assembly constituencies, the nomination of the official candidate of the party was rejected in the Edappadi Assembly constituency. While the party later extended support to K. Prem Kumar, he contested as an Independent candidate on television symbol.) It positioned itself as a rival to the oscillating duopoly of the Dravida Munnetra Kazhagam (DMK) and the All India Anna Dravida Munnetra Kazhagam (AIADMK), and an ideological opponent of the Bharatiya Janata Party, the ruling party of the Government of India. The incumbent DMK led the Secular Progressive Alliance (SPA), which was part of the Indian National Developmental Inclusive Alliance led by the Lok Sabha opposition, the Indian National Congress (INC); the SPA swept all the 39 seats in the state in the 2024 Lok Sabha election. The opposition AIADMK was part of the BJP's National Democratic Alliance (NDA). Nearly all exit poll agencies projected a second consecutive term for the DMK. In an upset result, the TVK emerged as the single largest party above the DMK and AIADMK, amassing 108 seats but short of majority (118). The SPA was reduced to 73 seats, with the DMK securing 59 and the INC five. The NDA won 53 seats, with the AIADMK securing 47 and the BJP only one. This created Tamil Nadu's first hung assembly. The AIADMK lost its official opposition status to the DMK.

Dubbed a watershed moment in modern Tamil Nadu history, the election marked the first time a non-Dravidian party emerged as the largest party in the assembly since the 1960s, breaking a tradition of power alternating between the DMK and the AIADMK. (Note: The DMK rose to power in 1967 and the same of the AIADMK in 1977; Tamil Nadu has been governed by these two parties ever since, until 2026.) The outgoing Chief Minister of Tamil Nadu, M. K. Stalin of the DMK, lost his election from the Kolathur constituency where he had previously won thrice consecutively. (Note: Stalin became the second incumbent Chief Minister of the state to lose their assemby membership after the AIADMK's J. Jayalalithaa lost in Bargur in 1996.) The TVK's chief-ministerial candidate Vijay won both the Perambur and Tiruchirappalli East constituencies he contested. (Note: Vijay became the first Chief Minister of Tamil Nadu since J. Jayalalithaa in 1991 to win from two constituencies, later vacating one of them.) The AIADMK's former Chief Minister, Edappadi K. Palaniswami, retained Edappadi with the widest winning margin in the state. (Note: 98,110 votes above the runner-up.) On 5 May 2026, Stalin resigned as Chief Minister. In the next few days, Vijay met the Governor of Tamil Nadu, Rajendra Arlekar, multiple times to stake claim to the formation of the new government, resulting in tensions and uncertainty. Vijay pursued a majority by inviting SPA parties other than DMK to render their support; INC left the SPA and joined the TVK government, while four other SPA parties extended their support to a TVK-led coalition government without leaving the alliance. (Note: The INC abruptly left the SPA after the results, retiring DMK from the INDIA bloc and adding TVK instead, which was met with criticism from the DMK. After days of consideration, the Communist Party of India (CPI), the Communist Party of India (Marxist) (CPI-M), Viduthalai Chiruthaigal Katchi (VCK) and the Indian Union Muslim League (IUML) agreed to support TVK for a stable, NDA-free government, while continuing their SPA membership.) Upon confirming a majority to Arlekar, Vijay was sworn in as Chief Minister on 10 May 2026. His government passed the floor test on 13 May.

Political critics and journalists stated that the anti-incumbency against the DMK government, Vijay's mobilization of his fanclubs into an unified party, TVK's well-funded and highly organized digital campaign portraying itself as a fresh, corruption-free alternative as opposed to the perceived fatigue over the Dravidian tenures as major factors that fueled Vijay's success, drawing comparisons with former actor-turned-Chief Ministers M. G. Ramachandran and J. Jayalalithaa. Analysts reported that TVK hauled the votebanks of both the DMK and AIADMK, pulling their youth, women, urban, and first-time voters irrespective of caste or religious affiliations, and attributed Vijay's appeal more to a promise of change rather than a meticulous ideology, highlighting the party's extensive and instrumental use of social media.

By June 2026, seven assembly seats had become vacant as Vijay resigned one of his two seats, (Note: Following his inauguration as Chief Minister, Vijay vacated the Tiruchirapalli East seat and retained the Perambur seat, as per Section 70 of the Representation of the People Act, 1951, which forbids any MLA or MP from representing two constituencies for more than 14 days and stipulates that they must resign one of the two seats within the said time.) and six AIADMK MLAs resigned their seats to join TVK, (Note: The five AIADMK MLAs had represented Madurantakam, Perundurai, Dharapuram, Ambasamudram, Viralimalai, and Karur.) drawing horse-trading allegations from critics argued that these are attempts by the TVK government to obtain an absolute majority. Two of the six defectors re-contested in the 6 October 2026 by-elections under TVK and gained both the seats for the party, increasing its house strength to 109. By-elections of the remaining four seats are to be announced.

== Background ==
Elections to state legislative assemblies in India are usually held once in five years, and the members of the legislative assembly are directly elected to serve five year terms from single-member constituencies. The previous assembly elections were held in April 2021 to elect the 234 members of the 16th Tamil Nadu Assembly, and the tenure of the assembly ends on 10 May 2026. In the previous election, the Dravida Munnetra Kazhagam (DMK)-led Secular Progressive Alliance (SPA) formed the state government after winning 159 of the 234 seats, and M. K. Stalin sworn in as the chief minister. The All India Anna Dravida Munnetra Kazhagam (AIADMK), which won 66 seats, became the principal opposition party and its leader Edappadi K. Palaniswami was elected and served as the leader of the opposition.

In June 2022, three members–O. Panneerselvam, P. H. Manoj Pandian, and R. Vaithilingam were expelled from the AIADMK. In August 2022, P. Ayyappan of the AIADMK also joined the expelled faction. K. A. Sengottaiyan was expelled from AIADMK in October 2025, and subsequently resigned from his position as a member of the assembly in November 2025. Manoj Pandian resigned as a member of the assembly in November 2025 and joined the DMK, with Vaithilingam following suit in January 2026. In late 2025, the Pattali Makkal Katchi (PMK) split into two factions, with three members expressing support to Anbumani Ramadoss and two members supporting S. Ramadoss. After Anbumani was recognised as the official leader of the PMK, Ramadoss formed a splinter faction of the PMK. Two members–T. K. Amulkandasami (AIADMK) and K. Ponnusamy (DMK) died on 21 June 2025 and 23 October 2025 respectively. On 27 February 2026, Pannerselvam and Ayyappan resigned from the assembly and joined the DMK.

Composition of the assembly
2021 election result		As on 27 February 2026	
Party	Seats	Party	Seats
DMK	133	DMK	133
AIADMK	66	AIADMK	60
INC	18	INC	17
PMK	5	PMK	3
PMK	5	APMK	2
BJP	4	BJP	4
VCK	4	VCK	4
CPI(M)	2	CPI(M)	2
CPI	2	CPI	2
		Vacant	7
Total	234	-	234

== Schedule ==
The Election Commission of India announced the schedule for the election on 15 March 2026.

Event	Date
Nomination	30 March 2026
Deadline for filing nominations	6 April 2026
Scrutiny of nominations	7 April 2026
Deadline for withdrawal of nomination	9 April 2026
Polling	23 April 2026
Counting of votes	4 May 2026
Deadline for the completion of election process	6 May 2026

== Parties and alliances ==
=== Secular Progressive Alliance ===
SPA seat sharing 2026

On 9 March 2024, Kamal Haasan's Makkal Needhi Maiam joined the Secular Progressive Alliance (SPA). Parties which formed part of the DMK-led alliance –Indian National Congress, Communist Party of India (Marxist), Communist Party of India, Marumalarchi Dravida Munnetra Kazhagam, and Viduthalai Chiruthaigal Katchi, that won all the 39 seats in the state in the 2024 general election, remained with the alliance despite emerging strains during subsequent seat-sharing negotiations.

On 19 February 2026, the Desiya Murpokku Dravida Kazhagam joined the DMK-led alliance. On 22 March 2026, T. Velmurugan-led Tamilaga Valvurimai Katchi withdrew its support to the DMK-led SPA. On 24 March 2026, Haasan announced that the Makkal Needhi Maiam would not contest the election, and would extended its support to the alliance. On 28 March 2026, DMK president Stalin released the party's candidate list for the assembly elections. The Congress released its list of candidates on 3 April 2026.

Secular Progressive Alliance
Party	Flag	Symbol	Leader	Seats	
Dravida Munnetra Kazhagam			M. K. Stalin	164	176
Marumalarchi Dravida Munnetra Kazhagam			Vaiko	4	176
Kongunadu Makkal Desia Katchi			E. R. Eswaran	2	176
Manithaneya Makkal Katchi			M. H. Jawahirullah	2	176
Manithaneya Jananayaga Katchi			Thamimum Ansari	1	176
Mukkulathor Pulipadai			Karunas	1	176
Social Democratic Party of India			V. M. S. Mohamed Mubarak	1	176
Tamilar Desam Katchi			K. K. Selvakumar	1	176
Indian National Congress			K. Selvaperunthagai	28	
Desiya Murpokku Dravida Kazhagam			Premalatha Vijayakanth	10	
Viduthalai Chiruthaigal Katchi			Thol. Thirumavalavan	8	
Communist Party of India (Marxist)			P. Shanmugam	5	
Communist Party of India			M. Veerapandian	5	
Indian Union Muslim League			K. M. Kader Mohideen	2	
Total				234	

=== AIADMK-led Alliance ===
AIADMK-led Alliance seat sharing map

On 25 September 2023, the AIADMK withdrew from the National Democratic Alliance (NDA) led by the Bharatiya Janata Party (BJP). In the 2024 general election, the AIADMK-led Alliance and the BJP-led NDA contested separately and both did not win any seat in the state. On 11 April 2025, both the parties reunited to form an alliance, with Palaniswami as the chief ministerial candidate. On 7 January 2026, the PMK, led by Anbumani, formally joined the AIADMK-led front. On 21 January 2026, T. T. V. Dhinakaran–led Amma Makkal Munnetra Kazhagam (AMMK) joined the alliance.

On 15 March 2026, the AIADMK constituted a four-member committee to hold consultations with its allies for seat sharing. On 23 March 2026, the AIADMK announced that it had finalised seat-sharing agreements with its principle allies, BJP, PMK and AMMK. On 25 March 2026, AIADMK released its first list of 23 candidates. The party released its second list, comprising 127 candidates on 27 March, and the final list of 17 candidates on 29 March 2026. On 30 March 2026, the PMK released the list of its candidates for the polls. The BJP released its list of candidates on 3 April 2026.

AIADMK-led Alliance
Party	Flag	Symbol	Leader	Seats	
All India Anna Dravida Munnetra Kazhagam			Edappadi K. Palaniswami	166	172
Indhiya Jananayaga Katchi			T. R. Paarivendhar	2	172
Puratchi Bharatham Katchi			M. Jagan Moorthy	1	172
Puthiya Needhi Katchi			A. C. Shanmugam	1	172
Singa Tamizhar Munnetra Kazhagam			R. V. Bharathan	1	172
Tamil Maanila Bahujan Samaj Party			Porkodi Armstrong	1	172
Bharatiya Janata Party			Nainar Nagendran	26	33
Tamil Maanila Congress (Moopanar)			G. K. Vasan	5	33
South Indian Forward Bloc			K. C. Thirumaran	1	33
Tamizhaga Makkal Munnetra Kazhagam			B. John Pandian	1	33
Pattali Makkal Katchi			Anbumani Ramadoss	18	
Amma Makkal Munnettra Kazagam			T. T. V. Dhinakaran	11	
Total				234	

=== Tamilaga Vettri Kazhagam ===
On 2 February 2024, actor C. Joseph Vijay announced the formation of his political party, Tamilaga Vettri Kazhagam (TVK), stating that it would contest the 2026 elections. On 18 March 2026, Vijay announced that the TVK will contest solo in all the 234 constituencies, and announced all the candidate list on 29 March 2026.

Party	Flag	Symbol	Leader	Seats
Tamilaga Vettri Kazhagam			C. Joseph Vijay	233
Independent			K. Premkumar	1

=== AJPK–AIPTMMK Alliance ===
On 20 March 2026, the Ramadoss-led faction of the PMK, joined hands with All India Puratchi Thalaivar Makkal Munnetra Kazhagam, led by V. K. Sasikala, to contest the assembly elections. On 30 March 2026, Ramadoss released first list of five candidates and Sasikala released a list of 21 candidates. On 31 March 2026, PMK(R) released a second list of candidates for ten constituencies. On 31 March 2026, AIPMMK released a second list of 38 candidates. On 1 April, Sasikala released a third list of five candidates. On 2 April, Ramadoss released the third and fourth list of ten and eight candidates respectively. On 4 April 2026, Sasikala released a fourth list of nine candidates.

APMK–AIPTMMK Alliance
Party	Flag	Symbol	Leader	Seats	
All India Puratchi Thalaivar Makkal Munnetra Kazhagam			V. K. Sasikala	71	82
Pasumpon Makkal Desam				2	82
Vellalar Munnetra Kazhagam				1	82
Others				8	82
Anaithindhiya Jananayaka Padhugappu Kazhagam (Note: Election Commission of India allotted gas cylinder as an election symbol to Pattali Makkal Katchi (S. Ramadoss) and Puthiya Tamilagam as they are not in direct contest in any of the constituencies.)			S. Ramadoss	38	
Total				120	

=== Others ===
In February 2026, Naam Tamilar Katchi released its list of 234 candidates for the polls. Puthiya Tamilagam released its first list of 43 candidates for the elections on 29 March 2026, and followed it up with a second list of 27 candidates on the next day.

In February 2025, All India N. R. Congress, the ruling party in the nearby union territory of Puducherry announced its intention to contest in the Tamil Nadu state elections.

Party	Flag	Symbol	Leader	Seats
Naam Tamilar Katchi			Seeman	234
Tamizhaga Vazhvurimai Katchi			T. Velmurugan	170
Bahujan Samaj Party			P. Anandan	118
Puthiya Tamilagam			K. Krishnasamy	70

=== Party-wise contest ===
Note: As per the party of the official symbol on which candidates contested.

Alliance and Party
Alliance and Party		AIADMK+			
Alliance and Party		AIADMK	BJP	PMK	AMMK
SPA					
SPA	DMK	135	25	8	8
SPA	INC	18	5	3	2
SPA	DMDK	6	—N/a	4	—N/a
SPA	VCK	5	—N/a	2	1
SPA	CPI(M)	2	2	1	—N/a
SPA	CPI	4	1	—N/a	—N/a
SPA	IUML	2	—N/a	—N/a	—N/a
Total		234			

As per the Election Commission, 4,023 candidates contested across the 234 constituencies in the state. According to the Association for Democratic Reforms, 404 out of the 722 candidates representing the major political parties had serious criminal cases pending them. Amongst these, 60 out of 170 candidates (35.3%) from the AIADMK, 43 out of 231 (18.6%) from the TVK, 32 out of 175 (18.3%) from the DMK, nine out of 33 (27.3%) from the BJP, five out of 28 (17.9%) from the Congress, six out of 18 (33.3%) from the PMK, one each from the DMDK and CPI declared serious criminal cases in their affidavits.

== Candidates ==
District	#	Constituency	TVK+		SPA		AIADMK+	
District	#	Constituency	Party	Candidate	Party	Candidate	Party	Candidate
Tiruvallur	1	Gummidipoondi	TVK	S. Vijayakumar	DMK	T. J. Govindrajan	ADMK	V. Sudhakar
Tiruvallur	2	Ponneri (SC)	TVK	M. S. Ravi	INC	Durai Chandrasekar	ADMK	P. Balaraman
Tiruvallur	3	Tiruttani	TVK	M. Sathyakumar	DMDK	D. Krishnamoorthy	ADMK	G. Hari
Tiruvallur	4	Thiruvallur	TVK	T. Arunkumar	DMK	V. G. Raajendran	ADMK	B. V. Ramana
Tiruvallur	5	Poonamallee (SC)	TVK	Prakasam. R.	DMK	A. Krishnaswamy	AMMK	T. A. Elumalai
Tiruvallur	6	Avadi	TVK	R. Ramesh Kumar	DMK	S. M. Nasar	BJP	M. Rajasimha Mahendra
Chennai	7	Maduravoyal	TVK	P. Rhevanth Charan	DMK	K. Ganapathy	ADMK	P. Benjamin
Chennai	8	Ambattur	TVK	G. Balamurugan	DMK	A. P. Poornima	PMK	K. N. Sekar
Chennai	9	Madhavaram	TVK	M. L. Vijay Prabhu	DMK	S. Sudharsanam	ADMK	V. Moorthy
Chennai	10	Thiruvottiyur	TVK	N. Senthil Kumar	CPI(M)	L. Sundararajan	ADMK	K. Kuppan
Chennai	11	Dr. R. K. Nagar	TVK	N. Marie Wilson	DMK	J. John Ebenezer	ADMK	R. S. Rajesh
Chennai	12	Perambur	TVK	C. Joseph Vijay	DMK	R. D. Shekar	PMK	M. Thilagabama
Chennai	13	Kolathur	TVK	V. S. Babu	DMK	M. K. Stalin	ADMK	P. Santhana Krishnan
Chennai	14	Villivakkam	TVK	Aadhav Arjuna	DMK	Karthik Mohan	ADMK	S. R. Vijayakumar
Chennai	15	Thiru-Vi-Ka-Nagar (SC)	TVK	M. R. Pallavi	DMK	K. S. Ravichandran	ADMK	Porkodi Armstrong (Note: Tamil Maanila Bahujan Samaj Party contested on the "Two Leaves" symbol of the All India Anna Dravida Munnetra Kazhagam (AIADMK), and is officially recorded as an AIADMK candidate in electoral records.)
Chennai	16	Egmore (SC)	TVK	A. Rajmohan	DMK	Tamilan Prasanna	ADMK	Abishek Rengasamy
Chennai	17	Royapuram	TVK	K. V. Vijay Damu	DMK	Subair Khan	ADMK	D. Jayakumar
Chennai	18	Harbour	TVK	Sinora P.S. Ashok	DMK	P. K. Sekar Babu	ADMK	R. Manohar
Chennai	19	Chepauk-Thiruvallikeni	TVK	D. Selvam	DMK	Udhayanidhi Stalin	ADMK	Adhi Rajaram
Chennai	20	Thousand Lights	TVK	J. C. D. Prabhakar	DMK	Ezhilan Naganathan	ADMK	B. Valarmathi
Chennai	21	Anna Nagar	TVK	V. K. Ramkumar	DMK	N. Chitrarasu	ADMK	Gokula Indira
Chennai	22	Virugambakkam	TVK	R. Sabarinathan	DMK	A. M. V. Prabhakara Raja	ADMK	V. N. Ravi
Chennai	23	Saidapet	TVK	Arul Prakasam. M.	DMK	Ma. Subramanian	AMMK	G. Senthamizhan
Chennai	24	Thiyagarayanagar	TVK	Bussy N. Anand	DMK	Raja Anbalagan	ADMK	B. Sathyanarayanan
Chennai	25	Mylapore	TVK	P. Venkataramanan	DMK	Dha. Velu	BJP	Tamilisai Soundararajan
Chennai	26	Velachery	TVK	R. Kumar	INC	J. M. H. Aassan Maulaana	ADMK	M. K. Ashok
Chennai	27	Sholinganallur	TVK	P. Saravanan	DMK	S. Aravind Ramesh	ADMK	K. P. Kandan
Chennai	28	Alandur	TVK	M. Harish	DMK	T. M. Anbarasan	ADMK	S. Saravanan
Kanchipuram	29	Sriperumbudur (SC)	TVK	Thennarasu. K.	INC	K. Selvaperunthagai	ADMK	K. Palani
Chengalpattu	30	Pallavaram	TVK	J. Kamatchi	DMDK	D. Murugesan	ADMK	Venkatesan (Note: Indhiya Jananayaka Katchi contested on the "Two Leaves" symbol of the All India Anna Dravida Munnetra Kazhagam (AIADMK), and is officially recorded as an AIADMK candidate in electoral records.)
Chengalpattu	31	Tambaram	TVK	D. Sarathkumar	DMK	R. S. Krithika Devi	ADMK	Chitlapakkam C. Rajendran
Chengalpattu	32	Chengalpattu	TVK	S. Thiyagarajan	DMK	M. K. T. Karthik Dhandapani	ADMK	M. Gajendran
Chengalpattu	33	Thiruporur	TVK	B. Vijayaraj	VCK	Panneer Doss	PMK	K. Balu
Chengalpattu	34	Cheyyur (SC)	TVK	K. Mohanraja	VCK	Sinthanai Selvan	ADMK	E. Rajasekar
Chengalpattu	35	Madurantakam (SC)	TVK	E. Ezhil Catherine	DMK	S. Amulu Ponmalar	ADMK	Maragatham Kumaravel
Kanchipuram	36	Uthiramerur	TVK	J. Munirathinam	DMK	K. Sundar	PMK	P. Maheshkumar
Kanchipuram	37	Kancheepuram	TVK	R. V. Ranjithkumar	DMK	Nithya Sugumar	ADMK	V. Somasundaram
Ranipet	38	Arakkonam (SC)	TVK	V. Gandhiraj	VCK	Ezhil Caroline	ADMK	S. Ravi
Ranipet	39	Sholinghur	TVK	G. Kapil	INC	A. M. Munirathinam	PMK	K. Saravanan
Vellore	40	Katpadi	TVK	M. Sudhakar	DMK	Durai Murugan	ADMK	V. Ramu
Ranipet	41	Ranipet	TVK	I. Tahira	DMK	R. Gandhi	BJP	V. M. Karthikeyan (Note: Tamil Maanila Congress (Moopanar) contested on the "Lotus" symbol of the Bhartiya Janata Party (BJP), and is officially recorded as a BJP candidate in electoral records.)
Ranipet	42	Arcot	TVK	G. Vijay Mohan	DMK	J. L. Eswarappan	ADMK	S. M. Sukumar
Vellore	43	Vellore	TVK	M. M. Vinoth Kannan	DMK	P. Karthikeyan	ADMK	S. R. K. Appu
Vellore	44	Anaikattu	TVK	R. Velmurugan	DMK	A. P. Nandakumar	ADMK	D. Velazhagan
Vellore	45	Kilvaithinankuppam (SC)	TVK	E. Thenral Kumar	DMK	Rajeswari Mohankandhi	ADMK	M. Jagan Moorthy (Note: Puratchi Bharatham Katchi contested on the "Two Leaves" symbol of the All India Anna Dravida Munnetra Kazhagam (AIADMK), and is officially recorded as an AIADMK candidate in electoral records.)
Vellore	46	Gudiyattam (SC)	TVK	K. Sindhu	DMDK	K. B. Pratap	ADMK	G. Faridha Purushothaman
Tirupathur	47	Vaniyambadi	TVK	S. Syed Bhurhanudeen	IUML	Syed Farooq Basha	ADMK	G. Senthilkumar
Tirupathur	48	Ambur	TVK	P. Imthiyas	DMK	A. C. Vilvanathan	ADMK	R. Venkatesan
Tirupathur	49	Jolarpet	TVK	C. Munisamy	DMK	Kavitha Dhandapani	ADMK	K. C. Veeramani
Tirupathur	50	Tiruppattur	TVK	N. Thirupathi	DMK	A. Nallathambi	AMMK	A. Gnanasekar
Krishnagiri	51	Uthangarai (SC)	TVK	N. Elaiyaraja	INC	R. Kuppusamy	ADMK	T. M. Tamilselvam
Krishnagiri	52	Bargur	TVK	E. Muralidharan	DMK	D. Mathiazhagan	ADMK	E. C. Govindarajan
Krishnagiri	53	Krishnagiri	TVK	P. Mukundhan	INC	A. Chellakumar	ADMK	K. Ashok Kumar
Krishnagiri	54	Veppanahalli	TVK	S. R. Sampangi	DMK	P. S. Sreenivasan	ADMK	K. P. Munusamy
Krishnagiri	55	Hosur	TVK	S. Vendarkarasan	DMK	S. A. Sathya	ADMK	P. Balakrishna Reddy
Krishnagiri	56	Thalli	TVK	G. Suresh	CPI	T. Ramachandran	BJP	Nagesh Kumar
Dharmapuri	57	Palacode	TVK	R. Gopi	DMK	S. Senthilkumar	ADMK	K. P. Anbalagan
Dharmapuri	58	Pennagaram	TVK	S. Gajendran	INC	G. K. M. Tamilkumaran	PMK	V. Selvam
Dharmapuri	59	Dharmapuri	TVK	M. Sivan	DMDK	V. Elangovan	PMK	Sowmiya Anbumani
Dharmapuri	60	Pappireddippatti	TVK	S. Thilagavathi	DMK	P. Palaniappan	ADMK	Maragatham Vetrivel
Dharmapuri	61	Harur (SC)	TVK	K. Rakesh	DMK	A. Shanmugam	ADMK	V. Sampathkumar
Tiruvannamalai	62	Chengam (SC)	TVK	K. Bharathidhasan	DMK	M. P. Giri	ADMK	T. S. Velu
Tiruvannamalai	63	Tiruvannamalai	TVK	A. Arul Arumugam	DMK	E. V. Velu	BJP	C. Ezhumalai
Tiruvannamalai	64	Kilpennathur	TVK	D. Raja	DMK	K. Pitchandi	ADMK	S. Ramachandran
Tiruvannamalai	65	Kalasapakkam	TVK	P. Elumalai	DMK	P. S. T. Saravanan	ADMK	Agri S. S. Krishnamurthy
Tiruvannamalai	66	Polur	TVK	R. Abishek	DMDK	T. P. Saravanan	PMK	C. R. Bhaskaran
Tiruvannamalai	67	Arani	TVK	V. Venkatesh Kumar	DMK	Mahalakshmi Govarthanan	ADMK	L. Jaya Sudha
Tiruvannamalai	68	Cheyyar	TVK	Dusi K. Mohan	DMK	O. Jothi	ADMK	Mukkur N. Subramanian
Tiruvannamalai	69	Vandavasi (SC)	TVK	M. Udayakumar	DMK	Ambethkumar	ADMK	P. Rani
Viluppuram	70	Gingee	TVK	B. Chandrasekaran	DMK	K. S. Masthan	PMK	A. Ganeshkumar
Viluppuram	71	Mailam	TVK	A. Vijay Niranjan	DMDK	L. Venkatesan	ADMK	C. Ve. Shanmugam
Viluppuram	72	Tindivanam (SC)	TVK	S. Sakthivel	VCK	Vanniyarasu	ADMK	P. Arjunan
Viluppuram	73	Vanur (SC)	TVK	G. P. Suresh	DMK	Gautham Dravidamani	ADMK	P. Murugan
Viluppuram	74	Villupuram	TVK	N. Mohanraj	DMK	R. Lakshmanan	ADMK	K. Vijaya
Viluppuram	75	Vikravandi	TVK	A. Vijay Vadivel	DMK	Anniyur Siva	PMK	C. Sivakumar
Viluppuram	76	Tirukkoyilur	TVK	Vijay R. Bharanibalaji	DMK	Gautham Sigamani	ADMK	S. Palaniswami
Kallakurichi	77	Ulundurpettai	TVK	M. Sudhakar	DMK	G. R. Vasanthavelu	ADMK	R. Kumaraguru
Kallakurichi	78	Rishivandiyam	TVK	G. Ashok Kumar	DMK	Vasantham Karthikeyan	PMK	A. P. Chezhiyan
Kallakurichi	79	Sankarapuram	TVK	A. Jagadesan	DMK	T. Udhaya Suriyan	ADMK	R. Rakesh
Kallakurichi	80	Kallakurichi (SC)	TVK	C. Arul Vignesh	VCK	Malathi	ADMK	S. Rajiv Gandhi
Salem	81	Gangavalli (SC)	TVK	V. Sujatha	DMK	K. Chinnadurai	ADMK	A. Nallathambi
Salem	82	Attur (SC)	TVK	R. Selvabharathi	INC	S. K. Arthanari	ADMK	A. P. Jayasankaran
Salem	83	Yercaud (ST)	TVK	J. Lakshmi	DMK	T. M. Revathi Matheswaran	ADMK	P. Usharani
Salem	84	Omalur	TVK	R. V. Adhiyamaan	DMDK	A. R. Elangovan	ADMK	R. Mani
Salem	85	Mettur	TVK	K. Selvam	DMK	Mithun Chakravarthy	ADMK	G. Venkatachalam
Salem	86	Edappadi	IND	K. Premkumar	DMK	Kasi	ADMK	Edappadi K. Palaniswami
Salem	87	Sangagiri	TVK	K. Senthil Kumar	DMK	M. Manikandan	ADMK	S. Vetrivel
Salem	88	Salem (West)	TVK	S. Lakshmanan	DMDK	Azhagappuram Mohan Raj	PMK	M. Karthi
Salem	89	Salem (North)	TVK	K. Sivakumar	DMK	R. Rajendran	PMK	S. Sadhasivam
Salem	90	Salem (South)	TVK	A. Vijay Tamilan Parthipan	DMK	M. Loganathan	ADMK	J. Vinodh
Salem	91	Veerapandi	TVK	M. S. Palanivel	DMK	A. K. Tharun	ADMK	Sri Balaji Sukumar
Namakkal	92	Rasipuram (SC)	TVK	D. Logesh Tamilselvan	DMK	M. Mathivendhan	BJP	S. D. Premkumar
Namakkal	93	Senthamangalam (ST)	TVK	P. Chandrasekar	DMK	P. Poomalar	ADMK	C. Chandrashekhar
Namakkal	94	Namakkal	TVK	C. S. Dilip	DMK	P. Rani	ADMK	Sridevi P. S. Mohan
Namakkal	95	Paramathi-Velur	TVK	A. Nandakumar	DMK	K. S. Moorthy	ADMK	S. Sekar
Namakkal	96	Tiruchengodu	TVK	K. G. Arunraj	DMK	E. R. Eswaran (Note: Kongunadu Makkal Desiya Katchi contested on the "Rising Sun" symbol of the Dravida Munnetra Kazhagam (DMK), and is officially recorded as a DMK candidate in electoral records.)	ADMK	R. Chandrashekhar
Namakkal	97	Kumarapalayam	TVK	C. Vijayalakshmi	DMK	S. Balu	ADMK	P. Thangamani
Erode	98	Erode (East)	TVK	M. Vijay Balaji	INC	Gobinath Palaniappan	ADMK	R. Manoharan
Erode	99	Erode (West)	TVK	K. K. Anand Mohan	DMK	S. Muthusamy	BJP	M. Yuvaraja
Erode	100	Modakkurichi	TVK	D. Shanmugan	DMK	Senthilnathan (Note: Marumalarchi Dravida Munnetra Kazhagam contested on the "Rising Sun" symbol of the Dravida Munnetra Kazhagam (DMK), and is officially recorded as a DMK candidate in electoral records.)	BJP	Kirthika Sivakumar
Tiruppur	101	Dharapuram (SC)	TVK	S. Gowrichitra	DMK	Indirani. T.	ADMK	P. Sathyabama
Tiruppur	102	Kangayam	TVK	P. Mani	DMK	M. P. Saminathan	ADMK	N. S. N. Nataraj
Erode	103	Perundurai	TVK	V. P. Arunachalam	DMK	N. D. Venkatachalam	ADMK	S. Jayakumar
Erode	104	Bhavani	TVK	M. P. Balakrishnan	DMK	K. A. Chandrasekhar	ADMK	K. C. Karuppannan
Erode	105	Anthiyur	TVK	M. Vijay Venkatesh	DMK	M. Sivabalan	ADMK	P. Haribhaskar
Erode	106	Gobichettipalayam	TVK	K. A. Sengottaiyan	DMK	N. Nallasivam	ADMK	V. B. Prabhu
Erode	107	Bhavanisagar (SC)	TVK	V. P. Tamilselvi	CPI	P. L. Sundaram	ADMK	A. Bannari
Nilgiris	108	Udhagamandalam	TVK	R. Ibrahim	INC	B. Ramachandran	BJP	M. Bhojarajan
Nilgiris	109	Gudalur (SC)	TVK	A. Deepak Sai Kishore	DMK	Dravidamani	ADMK	Pon. Jayaseelan
Nilgiris	110	Coonoor	TVK	C. Thangaraju	DMK	K. M. Raju	ADMK	A. Ramu
Coimbatore	111	Mettupalayam	TVK	N. Sunil Anand	DMK	Kavitha Kalyanachundaram	ADMK	O. K. Chinnaraj
Tiruppur	112	Avanashi (SC)	TVK	Kamali. S.	DMK	Gokilamani	BJP	L. Murugan
Tiruppur	113	Tiruppur (North)	TVK	V. Sathiyabama	CPI	Ravi Subramanian	ADMK	M. S. M. Anandan
Tiruppur	114	Tiruppur (South)	TVK	S. Balamurugan	DMK	K. Dineshkumar	BJP	S. Thangaraj
Tiruppur	115	Palladam	TVK	K. Ramkumar	DMK	K. Selvaraj	ADMK	K. P. Paramasivam
Coimbatore	116	Sulur	TVK	N. M. Sukumar	DMK	S. Murugesan	ADMK	V. P. Kandasamy
Coimbatore	117	Kavundampalayam	TVK	Kanimozhi Santhosh	INC	K. P. Suryaprakash	ADMK	P. R. G. Arunkumar
Coimbatore	118	Coimbatore (North)	TVK	V. Sampathkumar	DMK	Senthamizhselvan	BJP	Vanathi Srinivasan
Coimbatore	119	Thondamuthur	TVK	R. Sathish Raju	DMK	N. R. Karthikeyan	ADMK	S. P. Velumani
Coimbatore	120	Coimbatore (South)	TVK	V. Senthilkumar	DMK	V. Senthil Balaji	ADMK	Amman K. Arjunan
Coimbatore	121	Singanallur	TVK	K. S. Sri Giri Prasath	INC	V. Srinidhi Naidu	ADMK	K. R. Jayaraman
Coimbatore	122	Kinathukadavu	TVK	K. Vignesh	DMK	K. V. K. S. Sabari Karthikeyan	ADMK	S. Damodaran
Coimbatore	123	Pollachi	TVK	G. Ramanathan	DMK	K. Nithyanandhan	ADMK	Pollachi V. Jayaraman
Coimbatore	124	Valparai (SC)	TVK	A. Sridharan	DMK	A. Sudhakar	ADMK	D. Lakshmana Singh
Tiruppur	125	Udumalaipettai	TVK	G. K. Sankar	DMK	M. Jayakumar	ADMK	Udumalai K. Radhakrishnan
Tiruppur	126	Madathukulam	TVK	R. Thirumalai	DMK	R. Jayaramakrishnan	AMMK	C. Shanmugavelu
Dindigul	127	Palani	TVK	M. Praveen Kumar	CPI(M)	N. Pandi	ADMK	K. Ravi Manoharan
Dindigul	128	Oddanchatram	TVK	S. Mohan	DMK	R. Sakkarapani	BJP	Vidiyal Sekar
Dindigul	129	Athoor	TVK	N. Kalaiselvi	DMK	I. Periyasamy	ADMK	A. Viswanathan
Dindigul	130	Nilakottai (SC)	TVK	R. Ayyanar	DMK	Nagajothi	ADMK	S. Thaenmozhi
Dindigul	131	Natham	TVK	L.N. Ramesh	DMK	K. K. Selvakumar (Note: Tamilar Desam Katchi contested on the "Rising Sun" symbol of the Dravida Munnetra Kazhagam (DMK), and is officially recorded as a DMK candidate in electoral records.)	ADMK	Natham R. Viswanathan
Dindigul	132	Dindigul	TVK	G. Nazeer Raja	DMK	I. P. Senthilkumar	ADMK	Dindigul C. Sreenivasan
Dindigul	133	Vedasandur	TVK	N. Naka Jothi	DMK	S. Gandhirajan	ADMK	V. P. B. Paramasivam
Karur	134	Aravakurichi	TVK	P. Karthikeyan	DMK	Monjanur R. Elango	ADMK	K. Selvakumar
Karur	135	Karur	TVK	V.P. Mathiyalagan	DMK	Asi. M. Thyagarajan	ADMK	M. R. Vijayabhaskar
Karur	136	Krishnarayapuram (SC)	TVK	Sathya M.	DMK	C. K. Raja	ADMK	S. Dhivya
Karur	137	Kulithalai	TVK	G. Balasubramani	DMK	Suriyanur A. Chandiran	ADMK	S. Karunakaran
Tiruchirappalli	138	Manapaarai	TVK	R. Kathiravan	DMK	P. Abdul Samad (Note: Manithaneya Makkal Katchi contested on the "Rising Sun" symbol of the Dravida Munnetra Kazhagam (DMK), and is officially recorded as a DMK candidate in electoral records.)	ADMK	P. L. Vijayakumar
Tiruchirappalli	139	Srirangam	TVK	S. Ramesh	DMK	S. Durairaj	ADMK	R. Manoharan
Tiruchirappalli	140	Tiruchirappalli (West)	TVK	G. Ramamoorthy	DMK	K. N. Nehru	AMMK	M. Rajasekhar
Tiruchirappalli	141	Tiruchirappalli (East)	TVK	C. Joseph Vijay	DMK	Inigo Irudhayaraj	ADMK	K. Rajasekaran
Tiruchirappalli	142	Thiruverumbur	TVK	Navalpattu S. Viji	DMK	Anbil Mahesh Poyyamozhi	ADMK	P. Kumar
Tiruchirappalli	143	Lalgudi	TVK	Ku.Pa. Krishnan	DMK	T. Parivallal	ADMK	Leema Rose Martin
Tiruchirappalli	144	Manachanallur	TVK	V. Saravanan	DMK	S. Kathiravan	ADMK	R. V. Bharathan (Note: Singa Tamizhar Munnetra Kazhagam contested on the "Two Leaves" symbol of the All India Anna Dravida Munnetra Kazhagam (AIADMK), and is officially recorded as an AIADMK candidate in electoral records.)
Tiruchirappalli	145	Musiri	TVK	M. Vignesh	DMK	N. S. N. Karunairaja	ADMK	N. Yoganathan
Tiruchirappalli	146	Thuraiyur (SC)	TVK	M. Ravisankar	INC	M. Vichu Lenin Prasath	ADMK	E. Suroja
Perambalur	147	Perambalur (SC)	TVK	K. Sivakumar	DMK	S. D. Jayalakshmi	ADMK	R. Thamizhselvan
Perambalur	148	Kunnam	TVK	M. Revathi	DMK	S. S. Sivasankar	ADMK	Saranya Anbazhagan
Ariyalur	149	Ariyalur	TVK	M. Sivakumar	DMK	Latha Balu	ADMK	Thamarai S. Rajendran
Ariyalur	150	Jayankondam	TVK	K. G. Rajendran	DMK	Ka. So. Ka. Kannan	PMK	K. Vaithi
Cuddalore	151	Tittakudi (SC)	TVK	Rajasekar	DMK	C. V. Ganesan	ADMK	N. Murugumaran
Cuddalore	152	Virudhachalam	TVK	S. Vijay	DMDK	Premalatha Vijayakanth	PMK	Tamilarasi Adhimoolam
Cuddalore	153	Neyveli	TVK	K. Anand	DMK	Saba. Rajendran	ADMK	Sorathur R. Rajendran
Cuddalore	154	Panruti	TVK	M. Manikandan	VCK	Abdul Rahman	ADMK	K. Mohan
Cuddalore	155	Cuddalore	TVK	V. Rajkumar	INC	A. S. Chandrashekhar	ADMK	M. C. Sampath
Cuddalore	156	Kurinjipadi	TVK	Rajkumar	DMK	M. R. K. Panneerselvam	ADMK	A. Bhuvanendhran
Cuddalore	157	Bhuvanagiri	TVK	D. M. Mahalingam	DMK	Durai K. Saravana	ADMK	A. Arunmozhithevan
Cuddalore	158	Chidambaram	TVK	Nedunchezhiyan	DMK	Thamimun Ansari (Note: Manithaneya Jananayaka Katchi contested on the "Rising Sun" symbol of the Dravida Munnetra Kazhagam (DMK), and is officially recorded as a DMK candidate in electoral records.)	ADMK	K. A. Pandian
Cuddalore	159	Kattumannarkoil (SC)	TVK	S. Srinivasan	VCK	L. E. Jothimani	PMK	Anbu Cholan
Mayiladuthurai	160	Sirkazhi (SC)	TVK	C. S. Gopinath	DMK	R. Senthilselvan	ADMK	M. Sakthi
Mayiladuthurai	161	Mayiladuthurai	TVK	S. S. Haroon Rasheeth	INC	Jamal Yunus Muhammed	PMK	S. A. Palanichamy
Mayiladuthurai	162	Poompuhar	TVK	TGRJ. Vijayalayan	DMK	Nivedha M. Murugan	ADMK	S. Pavunraj
Nagapattinam	163	Nagapattinam	TVK	Sukumar	DMK	M. H. Jawahirullah	ADMK	Thanga Kathiravan
Nagapattinam	164	Kilvelur (SC)	TVK	T.A.P. Senthil Pandiyan	CPI(M)	D. Latha	PMK	Vadivel Ravanan
Nagapattinam	165	Vedaranyam	TVK	A. Kingsley Gerald	DMK	Ma.Me. Pugazhendhi	ADMK	O. S. Manian
Tiruvarur	166	Thiruthuraipoondi (SC)	TVK	S. Pandiyan	CPI	K. Marimuthu	ADMK	U. Paladhandayutham
Tiruvarur	167	Mannargudi	TVK	U. V. M. Rajarajan	DMK	T. R. B. Rajaa	AMMK	S. Kamaraj
Tiruvarur	168	Thiruvarur	TVK	V. Veeramani	DMK	K. Poondi Kalaivanan	BJP	Govi Chandru
Tiruvarur	169	Nannilam	TVK	S. Prabhakaran	DMK	V. M. S. Mohammed Mubarak (Note: Social Democratic Party of India contested on the "Rising Sun" symbol of the Dravida Munnetra Kazhagam (DMK), and is officially recorded as a DMK candidate in electoral records.)	ADMK	R. Kamaraj
Thanjavur	170	Thiruvidaimarudur (SC)	TVK	S. Prabhakaran	DMK	Govi. Chezian	ADMK	Ilamathi Subramanian
Thanjavur	171	Kumbakonam	TVK	R. Vinoth	DMK	G. Anbalagan	BJP	M. K. R. Ashok Kumar
Thanjavur	172	Papanasam	TVK	U. Azarudeen	IUML	A. M. Shahjahan	ADMK	D. Shanmugaprabhu
Thanjavur	173	Thiruvaiyaru	TVK	M. Manikandan	DMK	Durai. Chandrashekhar	AMMK	V. Karthikeyan
Thanjavur	174	Thanjavur	TVK	R. Vijay Saravanan	DMK	Ramanathan	BJP	M. Muruganantham
Thanjavur	175	Orathanadu	TVK	K. Aravind	DMK	R. Vaithialingam	ADMK	M. Sekar
Thanjavur	176	Pattukkottai	TVK	C Madhan	DMK	K. Annadurai	ADMK	C. V. Sekar
Thanjavur	177	Peravurani	TVK	T Chandra Kaandeeban	DMK	N. Ashokkumar	ADMK	Govi Ilango
Pudukkottai	178	Gandarvakottai (SC)	TVK	N Subramanian	CPI(M)	M. Chinndadurai	BJP	C. Udhayakumar
Pudukkottai	179	Viralimalai	TVK	P Murugesan	DMK	K. K. Chellapandian	ADMK	C. Vijayabhaskar
Pudukkottai	180	Pudukkottai	TVK	K. M. Shareef	DMK	V. Muthuraja	BJP	N. Ramachandran
Pudukkottai	181	Thirumayam	TVK	C. Sindhamani	DMK	S. Regupathy	ADMK	P. K. Vairamuthu
Pudukkottai	182	Alangudi	TVK	Durai Kandasamy	DMK	Siva V. Meyyanathan	ADMK	D. Vimal
Pudukkottai	183	Aranthangi	TVK	J. Mohamed Farvas	INC	T. Ramachandran	BJP	Kavitha Srikanth
Sivaganga	184	Karaikudi	TVK	T. K. Prabhu	INC	S. Mangudi	AMMK	Dherpoki V. Pandi
Sivaganga	185	Tiruppattur	TVK	Srinivasa Sethupathi	DMK	K. R. Periyakaruppan	BJP	K. C. Thirumaran (Note: South Indian Forward Bloc contested on the "Lotus" symbol of the Bhartiya Janata Party (BJP), and is officially recorded as a BJP candidate in electoral records.)
Sivaganga	186	Sivaganga	TVK	Kulanthai Rani	DMK	Karunas (Note: Mukkulathor Pulipadai contested on the "Rising Sun" symbol of the Dravida Munnetra Kazhagam (DMK), and is officially recorded as a DMK candidate in electoral records.)	ADMK	P. R. Senthilnathan
Sivaganga	187	Manamadurai (SC)	TVK	D. Elangovan	DMK	A. Tamilarasi	BJP	Pon V. Balaganapathy
Madurai	188	Melur	TVK	A. Madurai Veeran	INC	P. Viswanathan	ADMK	Periyapullan alias Selvam
Madurai	189	Madurai East	TVK	S. Karthikeyan	DMK	P. Moorthy	ADMK	K. Mahendran
Madurai	190	Sholavandan (SC)	TVK	M. V. Karuppaiah	DMK	A. Venkatesan	ADMK	K. Manickam
Madurai	191	Madurai North	TVK	A. Kallanai	DMK	G. Thalapathy	ADMK	P. Saravanan
Madurai	192	Madurai South	TVK	M. M. Gopison	DMK	M. Boominathan	BJP	Raama Sreenivasan
Madurai	193	Madurai Central	TVK	V. M. S. Mustafa	DMK	Palanivel Thiaga Rajan	ADMK	Sundar C (Note: Pudhiya Needhi Katchi contested on the "Two Leaves" symbol of the All India Anna Dravida Munnetra Kazhagam (AIADMK), and is officially recorded as an AIADMK candidate in electoral records.)
Madurai	194	Madurai West	TVK	S. R. Thangapandi	DMK	Raghu Balaji	ADMK	Sellur K. Raju
Madurai	195	Thiruparankundram	TVK	C. T. R. Nirmal Kumar	DMK	S. Keerthiga Thangapandi	ADMK	V. V. Rajan Chellappa
Madurai	196	Thirumangalam	TVK	N. Sathish Kumar	DMK	Sedapatti M. Manimaran	ADMK	R. B. Udhayakumar
Madurai	197	Usilampatti	TVK	Vijay Mahalingam	INC	T. Saravanakumar	ADMK	I. Mahendran
Theni	198	Andipatti	TVK	V. Pandi	DMK	A. Maharajan	ADMK	A. Logirajan
Theni	199	Periyakulam (SC)	TVK	G. Sabari	VCK	Attral Arasu	AMMK	K. Kathirkamu
Theni	200	Bodinayakanur	TVK	S. Prakash Kumar	DMK	O. Panneerselvam	ADMK	V. T. Narayansamy
Theni	201	Cumbum	TVK	P. L. A. Jaganath Mishra	DMK	N. Eramakrishnan	ADMK	S. T. K. Jakkaiyan
Virudhunagar	202	Rajapalayam	TVK	Karthik	DMK	S. Thanga Pandian	BJP	Priscilla Pandian (Note: Tamizhaga Makkal Munnetra Kazhagam contested on the "Lotus" symbol of the Bharatiya Janata Party (BJP), and is officially recorded as a BJP candidate in electoral records.)
Virudhunagar	203	Srivilliputhur (SC)	TVK	A. Karthik	CPI	P. Mahalingam	ADMK	M. Chandra Prabha
Virudhunagar	204	Sattur	TVK	M. Ajith	DMK	A. Kadarkarairaj	BJP	Nainar Nagendran
Virudhunagar	205	Sivakasi	TVK	S. Keerthana	INC	Ganesan Ashokan	ADMK	K. T. Rajenthra Bhalaji
Virudhunagar	206	Virudhunagar	TVK	S. P. Selvam	DMDK	Vijayaprabhakar	ADMK	V. G. Ganesan
Virudhunagar	207	Aruppukkottai	TVK	K. Karthik Kumar	DMK	K. K. S. S. R. Ramachandran	ADMK	S. Sethupathi
Virudhunagar	208	Tiruchuli	TVK	S. Samayan	DMK	Thangam Thennarasu	ADMK	M. S. R. Rajavarman
Ramanathapuram	209	Paramakudi (SC)	TVK	G. Gopinathan	DMK	K. K. Kathiravan	ADMK	S. Muthaiah
Ramanathapuram	210	Tiruvadanai	TVK	V. K. Rajeev	INC	Karu Manickam	ADMK	Keerthika Muniyasamy
Ramanathapuram	211	Ramanathapuram	TVK	E. K. Sahul Hameed	DMK	Katharbatcha Muthuramalingam	BJP	K. Nagendran
Ramanathapuram	212	Mudhukulathur	TVK	V. Malarvizhi Jayabala	DMK	R. S. Raja Kannappan	ADMK	S. Pandi
Thoothukudi	213	Vilathikulam	TVK	Kasiram	DMK	G. V. Markandayan	ADMK	R. Sathya
Thoothukudi	214	Thoothukkudi	TVK	Srinath	DMK	P. Geetha Jeevan	ADMK	S. T. Chellapandian
Thoothukudi	215	Tiruchendur	TVK	J. Murugan	DMK	Anitha R. Radhakrishnan	BJP	K. R. M. Radhakrishnan
Thoothukudi	216	Srivaikuntam	TVK	V. G. Saravanan	INC	Oorvasi S. Amirtharaj	ADMK	S. P. Shanmuganathan
Thoothukudi	217	Ottapidaram (SC)	TVK	P. Madhanraja	DMK	M. C. Shunmugaiah	AMMK	R. Sundararaj
Thoothukudi	218	Kovilpatti	TVK	S. Balasubramaniam	DMK	Ka. Karunanithi	ADMK	Kadambur Raju
Tenkasi	219	Sankarankovil (SC)	TVK	C. Ramarajan	INC	Sangai Ganesan	ADMK	Dhileepan Jayasankaran
Tenkasi	220	Vasudevanallur (SC)	TVK	R. Amudha Rani	DMK	E. Raja	BJP	Ananthan Ayyasamy
Tenkasi	221	Kadayanallur	TVK	R. K. Abdul Jalil	DMK	T. M. Rajendran	ADMK	C. Krishnamurali
Tenkasi	222	Tenkasi	TVK	A. Raja Prakash	DMK	Kalai Kathiravan	ADMK	S. Selvamohandas Pandian
Tenkasi	223	Alangulam	TVK	V. Vipin Chakravarthi	DMK	Manoj Pandian	ADMK	K. R. P. Prabakaran
Tirunelveli	224	Tirunelveli	TVK	R. S. Murughan	DMK	Su. Subramanian	ADMK	Thachai N. Ganesaraja
Tirunelveli	225	Ambasamudram	TVK	S. Rajagopal	INC	V. P. Durai	ADMK	Isakki Subhaya
Tirunelveli	226	Palayamkottai	TVK	S. Maria John	DMK	M. Abdul Wahab	ADMK	Syed Sulthan Sumsuddin
Tirunelveli	227	Nanguneri	TVK	Reddiarpatti V. Narayanan	INC	Rubi Manoharan	AMMK	R. Esakkimuthu
Tirunelveli	228	Radhapuram	TVK	Sathish Christopher	DMK	M. Appavu	BJP	S. P. Balakrishnan
Kanyakumari	229	Kanniyakumari	TVK	S. R. Madhavan	DMK	R. Mahesh	ADMK	Thalavai N. Sundaram
Kanyakumari	230	Nagercoil	TVK	G. Bervin Kings	DMK	S. Austin	BJP	M. R. Gandhi
Kanyakumari	231	Colachal	TVK	Prem Alex Lawrence	INC	Tharahai Cuthbert	BJP	T. Sivakumar
Kanyakumari	232	Padmanabhapuram	TVK	Kishore A/L Ravi Chandiran	CPI(M)	R. Chellaswamy	BJP	P. Ramesh
Kanyakumari	233	Vilavancode	TVK	K. Michael Kumar	INC	T. T. Praveen	BJP	S. Vijayadharani
Kanyakumari	234	Killiyoor	TVK	S. Sabin	INC	S. Rajesh Kumar	BJP	Nivin Simon

== Campaign ==
Following an order of the Madras High Court, the Government of Tamil Nadu announced new rules and guidelines for political rallies in the state in January 2026.

=== Secular Progressive Alliance ===
On 1 June 2025, DMK president Stalin launched "Oraniyil Tamil Nadu" (Tamil Nadu as one team), an enrollment drive to add new party members and urged the party cadres to enroll at least 30% of voters in each polling booth to the party through a door-to-door outreach. On 24 March, the party released a song for its campaign with the theme "Stalin Thodarattum, Tamil Nadu Vellattum" (let Stalin continue, let Tamil Nadu triumph).

Manifesto

On 29 March 2026, Stalin released the party's manifesto for the elections. It promised ₹8,000 (US$85) coupons for non–income tax-paying homemakers to purchase household appliances, extension of the chief minister's breakfast scheme in government schools till class eight, free laptops to all government college students, enhancement of the monthly entitlement for women to ₹2,000 (US$21), increase in old-age pension from ₹1,200 (US$13) to ₹2,000 (US$21), and provision of ₹2,500 (US$27) for persons with disabilities. It also proposed expanding coverage under the state government insurance scheme to ₹1.5 million (US$16,000) and construction of a million houses for the poor. Other proposals included the procurement of 10,000 new buses, development of high-quality bus shelters, introduction of mini-bus services in remote areas, expansion of Coimbatore International Airport, establishment of a cargo terminal at Thoothukudi Airport, ₹100 billion (US$1.1 billion) for beautification of roads and parks in urban areas, and establishment of future-ready global cities near major cities. The party proposed to attract foreign investment of about ₹1,800 trillion (US$19 trillion), and creation of employment opportunities for five million youth. In the agriculture sector, it included provision for distribution of free pump sets to two million farmers, increase in procurement price of paddy and sugarcane, raising milk procurement price by ₹5 (5.3¢ US) per litre, desilting of 15,500 km of irrigation canals, and financial assistance to fishermen during fishing ban and low-catch periods. It also proposed interest-free loans up to ₹0.5 million (US$5,300) for self-help groups, establishment of a library to promote awareness of the anti-Hindi imposition movement, and introduction of capital punishment for crimes against children below eight years of age.

=== AIADMK-led Alliance ===
On 7 July 2025, AIADMK general secretary Palaniswami launched a statewide campaign with the slogan "Makkalai Kaappom, Thamizhagathai Meetpom" (let's protect the people, let's save Tamil Nadu).

Manifesto

On 24 March 2026, AIADMK general secretary Palaniswami released the party's election manifesto, which contained 297 promises. The manifesto proposed a range of welfare and economic measures, including a monthly assistance of ₹2,000 (US$21) for women, a ₹10,000 (US$110) relief payment per family to address rising prices, monthly assistance of ₹2,000 (US$21) for unemployed graduates, subsidiary of ₹25,000 (US$270) for working women to buy two-wheelers, and an increase in pension benefits to ₹2,000 (US$21) for senior citizens. It also proposed waiver of education and crop loans, provision of free refrigerators to poor families, three free LPG cylinders per year, and extension of free travel in local government buses to men. The party further proposed the increase of mandatory work days from 100 to 150 days under the rural employment scheme, increase of quota for government school students to 10% in government medical colleges and full coverage of major medical expenses for major treatments for state insurance holders. Additional measures included subsidies for solar power installations, revival of the marriage assistance scheme, expansion of subsidised government clinics, implementation of prohibition by closing liquor shops in phases, higher minimum support prices for paddy and sugarcane, and provision of free pulses and cooking oil through the Public Distribution System.

=== Naam Tamilar Katchi ===
On 22 March 2026, the NTK announced the first phase of its election campaign schedule, stating that the party's chief coordinator, Seeman, would address nine public meetings by the end of March 2026.

Manifesto

On 27 March 2026, Seeman released the party's election manifesto, which included administrative reforms such as the creation of multiple functional capitals for the state, equal representation for women in legislative bodies, and fair pricing for farmers and fishermen, and other welfare schemes. It also proposed plans for the conservation of natural resources, food security, waste management, climate change and sustainability.

=== Tamilaga Vetri Kazhagam ===
On 13 September 2025, TVK president Vijay launched his party's election campaign in Tiruchirappalli, with subsequent rallies planned on weekends. However, following a crowd crush that resulted in the deaths of 41 people and injuries to 80-120 others, during a political rally hosted by TVK in Karur, he suspended the campaign temporarily. During the campaigning, Adhav Arjuna, the general secretary of the TVK, made controversial remarks about actor Rajinikanth, which criticism from politicians and public. Vijay started his campaign for the elections on 30 March 2026, after filing his nomination to contest the elections from the Perambur Assembly constituency.

Manifesto

On 29 March 2026, Vijay released the manifesto for the elections. The TVK manifesto promised drug free state, job assurance to youth, collateral-free education and startup loans, and monthly financial assistance to students.

== Surveys and polls ==
=== Opinion polls ===
Seat projections
Polling agency	Date published	Sample size					Lead
Polling agency	Date published	Sample size	SPA	AIADMK+	TVK	Others	Lead
IANS-Matrize	15 March 2026	17,410	104-114	114-127	6-12	1-6	0-23
News18-Vote Vibe	23 March 2026	7,992	113-123	106-116	2-8	0	3-17
Agni News Agency	23 March 2026	101,643	180+	50-60	0-10	0	120-130
Lokpoll	1 April 2026	117,000	181-189	38-42	8-10	0	139-151
News18-Vote Vibe	6 April 2026	24,943	90-100	130-140	2-6	0	30-50
Spick Media	17 April 2026	126,801	88-94	112-120	4-5	0	18-32
Vikatan	18 April 2026	93,600	121	83	3	0	38
Thanthi TV	20 April 2026	60,000	98-103	91-101	1-2	0	Hung

Vote share projections
Polling agency	Date published	Sample size					Lead
Polling agency	Date published	Sample size	SPA	AIADMK+	TVK	Others	Lead
IANS-Matrize	15 March 2026	17,410	37-38%	39-40%	14-15%	10-12%	1-3%
News18-Vote Vibe	23 March 2026	7,992	40%	38%	15%	7%	2%
Agni News Agency	23 March 2026	101,643	44.9%	38.5%	9.7%	6.9%	6.4%
Lokpoll	1 April 2026	117,000	40.1%	29%	23.9%	7%	11.1%
News18-Vote Vibe	6 April 2026	24,943	39%	41%	12%	8%	2%
Spick Media	17 April 2026	126,801	37.47%	38.85%	14.81%	8.47%	0.98%
Vikatan	18 April 2026	93,600	37.5%	33.63%	24.71%	4.16%	3.87%
Dinamalar	20 April 2026	25,691	32%	36%	23%	9%	4%

=== Exit polls ===
The Election Commission had banned the publication of any exit poll from 7 am on 9 April until 6.30 pm on 29 April to prevent any influence on voters across the five state assembly elections.

Seat projection
Polling agency	Date published					Lead
Polling agency	Date published	SPA	AIADMK+	TVK	Others	Lead
Agni News Agency	29 April 2026	169	64	1	0	105
Axis My India	29 April 2026	92-110	22-32	98-120	0	6-10
Chanakya Strategies	29 April 2026	145-160	50-65	13-18	5-8	80-110
JVC	29 April 2026	75-97	128-147	8-15	0	31-72
Kamakhya Analytics	29 April 2026	78-95	68-84	67-81	0	Hung
Matrize	29 April 2026	122-132	87-110	10-12	0-6	12-45
P Marq	29 April 2026	125-145	65-85	16-26	1-6	40-80
People Insight	29 April 2026	122-140	60-70	30-40	0-4	52-80
People's Pulse	29 April 2026	125-145	65-80	18-24	2-6	45-80
Political Laboratory	29 April 2026	135-140	82-85	10-14	0	50-58
Praja Poll	29 April 2026	148-168	61-81	0	0	67-107
Spick Media	29 April 2026	89-101	124-127	4-6	0	23-38
Today's Chanakya	29 April 2026	114-136	34-56	52-74	0-2	40-84
Vote Vibe	29 April 2026	103-113	114-124	4-10	0	1-21
Minnambalam	29 April 2026	155	72	5	0	83
Actual Results	4 May 2026	73	53	108	0	Hung

Vote share projection
Polling agency	Date published					Lead
Polling agency	Date published	SPA	AIADMK+	TVK	Others	Lead
Agni News Agency	29 April 2026	43.1%	34.8%	15.1%	7%	8.3%
Axis My India	29 April 2026	35%	23%	35%	4%	Hung
Chanakya Strategies	29 April 2026	42-46%	36-40%	12-16%	4-6%	2-10%
Matrize	29 April 2026	40.3%	37.1%	17.5%	5.1%	3.2%
P-Marq	29 April 2026	36%	31%	23%	10%	5%
People's Pulse	29 April 2026	38.4%	31.5%	23.6%	6.5%	6.9%
Spick Media	29 April 2026	36.21%	36.5%	21.6%	5.69%	0.29%
Vote Vibe	29 April 2026	38.9%	39.9%	15.8%	5.4%	1%
Today's Chanakya	29 April 2026	39%	27%	30%	4%	9%
People's Insight	29 April 2026	36.5%	30.8%	25.12%	%	5.7%
Minnambalam	29 April 2026	37.04%	35.03%	19.74%	6.4%	2.01%
Kamakhya Analytics	29 April 2026	33-35%	29-33%	25-31%	4-6%	0-2%

== Voting ==
A Special Intensive Revision (SIR) was conducted by Election Commission of India before the polls, and in February 2026, after the exercise, 56,707,380 voters were declared as eligible to vote in the 2026 assembly election in Tamil Nadu. As per the final voter list, 57.3 million voters were eligible to vote in the assembly elections in Tamil Nadu. This includes 28.3 million male, 29.3 million female, and 7,728 third gender voters.

The polling was held on 23 April 2026 across 75,064 polling stations across 33,133 locations in the state. About 1,06,418 Electronic Voting Machines were used for the polls. As per the data released by the Election Commission after the polling day, the state recorded 84.69% voter turnout, which was 11.06% higher than the preceding assembly elections in 2021, and the highest ever recorded in the assembly elections in the state. Of the registered electorate of 57.3 million, 83.57% of male, 85.76% of female, and 60.49% of third gender voters cast their votes. On 25 April, the turnout was revised to 85.1%.

The votes polled increased by 5.5% compared to the previous assembly election in 2021, while the increase was 6.22% in 2021, 18.5% in 2016, and 11.4% in 2011 when compared to the respective previous assembly elections in the state. Despite the lower increase in the actual votes polled, the higher percentage of voter turnout is attributed in part to the revision of the electoral rolls during the SIR process conducted prior to the polls.

=== Voter turnout by district ===
District	Turnout (%)
Thiruvallur	83.76
Chennai	83.74
Kanchipuram	87.39
Chengalpattu	85.46
Ranipet	89.89
Vellore	88.76
Thirupattur	88.90
Krishnagiri	85.48
Dharmapuri	90.13
Thiruvannamalai	89.66
Villupuram	88.99
Kallakurichi	88.50
Salem	90.76
Namakkal	90.21
Erode	90.10
Tiruppur	88.59
Nilgris	78.92
Coimbatore	84.76
Dindigul	89.25
Karur	92.63
Thiruchirapalli	85.44
Perambalur	85.50
Ariyalur	87.41
Cuddalore	85.49
Mayiladuthurai	82.14
Nagapattinam	86.30
Thiruvarur	83.69
Thanjavur	80.63
Pudukottai	83.90
Sivaganga	76.66
Madurai	80.52
Theni	81.55
Virudhunagar	84.82
Ramanathapuram	77.01
Thoothukudi	80.53
Tenkasi	82.41
Tirunelveli	77.94
Kanniyakumari	75.61

== Results ==
108
TVK
73
SPA
53
AIADMK+

The newly founded TVK outperformed exit polls to emerge as the single largest party in both seat share and popular vote in a hung assembly, becoming the first party led by an actor-turned politician to do so in its debut Assembly election since 1977, a feat achieved by M. G. Ramachandran. 15 ministers from the outgoing Stalin cabinet were defeated in their respective constituencies.

Vote share by party/alliance
1. TVK (35.0%)
2. SPA (31.4%)
3. AIADMK+ (27.2%)
4. Others (6.37%)

=== Results by pre-poll alliance or party ===
Alliance/ Party		Popular vote			Seats		
Alliance/ Party		Votes	%	±pp	Contested	Won	Change
TVK+	TVK	17,226,209	34.92	New	233	108	New
TVK+	IND	50,823	0.10	New	1	0	Steady
TVK+	Total	17,277,032	35.02	New	234	108	New
SPA	DMK	11,929,144	24.19	▼13.51	176	59	▼74
SPA	INC	1,661,312	3.37	▼0.90	28	5	▼13
SPA	DMDK	589,500	1.20	▲0.77	10	1	▲1
SPA	VCK	540,056	1.09	▲0.10	8	2	▼2
SPA	CPI	326,488	0.66	▼0.43	5	2	Steady
SPA	CPI(M)	293,817	0.60	▼0.25	5	2	Steady
SPA	IUML	142,465	0.29	▼0.19	2	2	▲2
SPA	Total	15,482,782	31.40	▼14.41	234	73	▼86
ADMK+	ADMK	10,462,146	21.21	▼12.08	172	47	▼19
ADMK+	BJP	1,467,024	2.97	▲0.35	33	1	▼3
ADMK+	PMK	1,070,745	2.17	▼1.63	18	4	▼1
ADMK+	AMMK	425,345	0.86	▼1.49	11	1	▲1
ADMK+	Total	13,425,260	27.21	▼14.85	234	53	▼22
NTK		1,972,537	4.00	▼2.89	234	0	Steady
Others		966,709	1.96	▼2.53	3,087	0	Steady
NOTA		199,805	0.41	▼0.34			
Total		49,324,125	100.00	—	4,023	234	±0
Valid votes		49,324,125					
Invalid votes		65,833	0.13				
Votes cast / turnout		49,324,125	86.02				
Abstentions		8,019,166	13.98				
Registered voters		57,343,291					

=== Results by district ===
District	Seats			
District	Seats	TVK	SPA	NDA
Thiruvallur	6	5	—N/a	1
Chennai	22	20	2	—N/a
Kancheepuram	3	3	—N/a	—N/a
Chengalpattu	6	4	—N/a	2
Ranipet	4	3	—N/a	1
Vellore	5	4	—N/a	1
Thirupattur	4	1	2	1
Krishnagiri	6	2	2	2
Dharmapuri	5	1	—N/a	4
Thiruvanamalai	8	1	2	5
Villupuram	7	—N/a	3	4
Kallakurichi	4	1	1	2
Salem	11	4	—N/a	7
Namakkal	6	5	—N/a	1
Erode	8	5	—N/a	3
Nilgiris	3	—N/a	2	1
Thiruppur	8	4	2	2
Coimbatore	10	6	3	1
Dindigal	7	1	4	2
Karur	4	1	2	1
Tiruchirapalli	9	6	2	1
Perambalur	2	1	1	—N/a
Ariyalur	2	—N/a	—N/a	2
Cuddalore	9	1	5	3
Mayiladuthurai	3	—N/a	3	—N/a
Nagapattinam	3	—N/a	2	1
Thiruvarur	4	—N/a	2	2
Thanjavur	8	2	6	—N/a
Pudukottai	6	2	3	1
Sivaganga	4	4	—N/a	—N/a
Madurai	10	8	2	—N/a
Theni	4	2	2	—N/a
Virudhunagar	7	4	3	—N/a
Ramanathapuram	4	1	3	—N/a
Thoothukudi	6	3	3	—N/a
Tenkasi	5	—N/a	4	1
Tirunelveli	5	3	1	1
Kanyakumari	6	—N/a	5	1
Total	234	108	73	53

=== Results by region ===
District	Seats			
District	Seats	TVK	SPA	NDA
Northern Tamil Nadu	69	44	8	17
Western Tamil Nadu	68	27	17	24
Southern Tamil Nadu	51	25	23	3
Central Tamil Nadu	46	12	24	10
Total	234	108	73	53

=== Results by constituency ===
District	Constituency		Winner				Runner Up				Margin
District	#	Name (Note: SC and ST indicate constituencies reserved for Scheduled Castes and Scheduled Tribes respectively.)	Candidate	Party	Votes	%	Candidate	Party	Votes	%	Margin
Tiruvallur	1	Gummidipoondi	S. Vijayakumar	TVK	94,320	40.56	V. Sudhakar	ADMK	66,375	28.55	27,945
Tiruvallur	2	Ponneri (SC)	M. S. Ravi	TVK	1,10,439	48.69	Durai Chandrasekar	INC	54,671	24.10	55,768
Tiruvallur	3	Tiruttani	G. Hari	ADMK	89,169	37.34	M. Sathyakumar	TVK	83,376	34.91	5,793
Tiruvallur	4	Thiruvallur	T. Arunkumar	TVK	92,190	40.71	V. G. Raajendran	DMK	67,430	29.78	24,760
Tiruvallur	5	Poonamallee (SC)	Prakasam. R.	TVK	1,61,309	52.22	A. Krishnaswamy	DMK	88,569	28.67	72,740
Tiruvallur	6	Avadi	R. Ramesh Kumar	TVK	1,80,384	52.13	S. M. Nasar	DMK	1,04,073	30.08	76,311
Chennai	7	Maduravoyal	P. Rhevanth Charan	TVK	1,41,725	48.26	K. Ganapathy	DMK	80,216	27.31	61,509
Chennai	8	Ambattur	G. Balamurugan	TVK	1,33,339	51.29	A. P. Poornima	DMK	74,558	28.68	58,781
Chennai	9	Madavaram	M. L. Vijay Prabhu	TVK	1,90,462	52.61	S. Sudharsanam	DMK	95,477	26.38	94,985
Chennai	10	Thiruvottiyur	N. Senthil Kumar	TVK	1,10,067	53.15	L. Sundararajan	CPI(M)	56,503	27.28	53,564
Chennai	11	R.K. Nagar	N. Marie Wilson	TVK	97,800	53.97	J. John Ebenezer	DMK	48,132	26.56	49,668
Chennai	12	Perambur	C. Joseph Vijay	TVK	1,20,365	58.89	R. D. Shekar	DMK	66,650	32.61	53,715
Chennai	13	Kolathur	V. S. Babu	TVK	82,997	45.09	M. K. Stalin	DMK	74,202	40.32	8,795
Chennai	14	Villivakkam	Aadhav Arjuna	TVK	66,445	46.97	Karthik Mohan	DMK	49,143	34.74	17,302
Chennai	15	Thiru-Vi-Ka-Nagar (SC)	M. R. Pallavi	TVK	69,125	48.04	K. S. Ravichandran	DMK	46,792	32.52	22,333
Chennai	16	Egmore (SC)	A. Rajmohan	TVK	53,901	45.02	Tamilan Prasanna	DMK	43,097	35.99	10,804
Chennai	17	Royapuram	K. V. Vijay Damu	TVK	59,091	46.40	Subair Khan	DMK	44,842	35.21	14,249
Chennai	18	Harbour	P. K. Sekar Babu	DMK	45,254	45.43	Sinora PS Ashok	TVK	33,504	33.63	11,750
Chennai	19	Chepauk-Thiruvallikeni	Udhayanidhi Stalin	DMK	62,992	44.76	Selvam D.	TVK	55,852	39.68	7,140
Chennai	20	Thousand Lights	J. C. D. Prabhakar	TVK	58,965	44.73	Ezhilan Naganathan	DMK	43,824	33.24	15,141
Chennai	21	Anna Nagar	V. K. Ramkumar	TVK	71,375	43.70	N. Chitrarasu	DMK	50,012	30.62	21,363
Chennai	22	Virugambakkam	R. Sabarinathan	TVK	76,092	44.03	A. M. V. Prabhakara Rajaa	DMK	49,006	28.35	27,086
Chennai	23	Saidapet	Arul Prakasam. M.	TVK	81,205	50.63	Ma. Subramanian	DMK	52,691	32.85	28,514
Chennai	24	Thiyagarayanagar	N. Anand	TVK	51,632	38.55	B. Sathyanarayanan	ADMK	38,605	28.83	13,027
Chennai	25	Mylapore	P. Venkataramanan	TVK	70,070	46.53	Dha. Velu	DMK	41,098	27.29	28,972
Chennai	26	Velachery	R. Kumar	TVK	80,430	43.52	M. K. Ashok	ADMK	47,125	25.50	33,305
Chennai	27	Shozhinganallur	P. Saravanan	TVK	2,20,382	49.27	S. Aravind Ramesh	DMK	1,23,602	27.63	96,780
Chennai	28	Alandur	M. Harish	TVK	1,12,205	42.90	T. M. Anbarasan	DMK	82,596	31.58	29,609
Kanchipuram	29	Sriperumbudur (SC)	Thennarasu. K.	TVK	1,47,611	44.58	K. Selvaperunthagai	INC	93,365	28.20	54,246
Chengalpattu	30	Pallavaram	J. Kamatchi	TVK	1,33,611	47.10	D. Murugesan	DMDK	78,918	27.82	54,693
Chengalpattu	31	Tambaram	D. Sarathkumar	TVK	1,18,967	42.67	R. S. Krithika Devi	DMK	83,346	29.89	35,621
Chengalpattu	32	Chengalpattu	S. Thiyagarajan	TVK	1,37,136	42.32	M. K. T. Karthik Dhandapani	DMK	1,01,495	31.32	35,641
Chengalpattu	33	Thiruporur	B. Vijayaraj	TVK	1,10,095	41.96	Panneer Doss	VCK	70,744	26.96	39,351
Chengalpattu	34	Cheyyur (SC)	E. Rajasekar	ADMK	63,809	34.02	K. Mohanraja	TVK	58,141	30.99	5,668
Chengalpattu	35	Madurantakam (SC)	Maragatham Kumaravel	ADMK	69,284	34.95	E. Ezhil Catherine	TVK	62,090	31.32	7,194
Kanchipuram	36	Uthiramerur	J. Munirathinam	TVK	84,917	37.28	K. Sundar	DMK	70,694	31.04	14,223
Kanchipuram	37	Kancheepuram	R. V. Ranjithkumar	TVK	91,350	37.09	V. Somasundaram	ADMK	75,862	30.80	15,488
Ranipet	38	Arakkonam (SC)	V. Gandhiraj	TVK	73,776	40.46	Ezhil Caroline	VCK	50,655	27.78	23,121
Ranipet	39	Sholinghur	G. Kapil	TVK	84,506	36.16	K. Saravanan	PMK	78,820	33.73	5,686
Vellore	40	Katpadi	M. Sudhakar	TVK	69,868	34.33	V. Ramu	ADMK	63,998	31.45	5,870
Ranipet	41	Ranipet	I. Tahira	TVK	91,149	41.24	R. Gandhi	DMK	85,362	38.62	5,787
Ranipet	42	Arcot	S. M. Sukumar	ADMK	1,05,608	46.77	G. Vijay Mohan	TVK	62,888	27.85	42,720
Vellore	43	Vellore	M. M. Vinoth Kannan	TVK	73,032	38.33	P. Karthikeyan	DMK	66,255	34.77	6,777
Vellore	44	Anaikattu	D. Velazhagan	ADMK	76,302	35.27	A. P. Nandakumar	DMK	69,221	32.00	7,081
Vellore	45	Kilvaithinankuppam (SC)	E. Thenral Kumar	TVK	74,305	39.13	M. Jagan Moorthy	ADMK	54,050	28.46	20,255
Vellore	46	Gudiyattam (SC)	K. Sindhu	TVK	82,858	36.17	K. B. Pratap	DMDK	72,761	31.76	10,097
Tirupathur	47	Vaniyambadi	Syed Farooq Basha	IUML	73,181	34.43	S. Syed Bhurhanudeen	TVK	70,199	33.03	2,982
Tirupathur	48	Ambur	A. C. Vilvanathan	DMK	74,102	37.89	P. Imthiyas	TVK	66,971	34.24	7,131
Tirupathur	49	Jolarpet	K. C. Veeramani	ADMK	78,633	36.91	C. Munisamy	TVK	62,550	29.36	16,083
Tirupathur	50	Tiruppattur	N. Thirupathi	TVK	1,05,098	51.79	A. Nallathambi	DMK	56,835	28.01	48,263
Krishnagiri	51	Uthangarai (SC)	N. Elaiyaraja	TVK	70,201	34.16	T. M. Tamilselvam	ADMK	65,003	31.63	5,198
Krishnagiri	52	Bargur	E. C. Govindarasan	ADMK	71,240	33.30	E. Muralidharan	TVK	66,999	31.31	4,241
Krishnagiri	53	Krishnagiri	P. Mukundhan	TVK	89,374	38.83	Ashok Kumar. K	ADMK	70,530	30.64	18,844
Krishnagiri	54	Veppanahalli	P. S. Srinivasan	DMK	74,691	33.55	K. P. Munusamy	ADMK	74,553	33.49	138
Krishnagiri	55	Hosur	P. Balakrishna Reddy	ADMK	1,09,867	39.55	Vendarkarasan. S	TVK	82,064	29.54	27,803
Krishnagiri	56	Thalli	T. Ramachandran	CPI	78,283	38.02	C. Nagesh Kumar	BJP	73,043	35.48	5,240
Dharmapuri	57	Palacode	K. P. Anbalagan	ADMK	1,02,807	45.64	R. Gopi	TVK	63,765	28.31	39,042
Dharmapuri	58	Pennagaram	S. Gajendran	TVK	81,240	35.53	V. Selvam	PMK	78,075	34.14	3,165
Dharmapuri	59	Dharmapuri	Sowmiya Anbumani	PMK	93,173	39.28	M. Sivan	TVK	72,817	30.52	20,896
Dharmapuri	60	Pappireddippatti	Maragatham Vetrivel	ADMK	1,01,829	43.03	P. Palaniappan	DMK	68,715	29.04	33,114
Dharmapuri	61	Harur (SC)	V. Sampathkumar	ADMK	75,523	34.32	A. Shanmugam	DMK	72,194	32.81	3,329
Tiruvannamalai	62	Chengam (SC)	S. Velu	ADMK	87,802	36.15	K. Bharatidhasan	TVK	74,524	30.68	13,278
Tiruvannamalai	63	Tiruvannamalai	E. V. Velu	DMK	88,273	40.11	Arul Arumugam	TVK	85,818	39.00	2,455
Tiruvannamalai	64	Kilpennathur	S. Ramachandran	ADMK	90,503	41.18	K. Pitchandi	DMK	60,038	27.32	30,465
Tiruvannamalai	65	Kalasapakkam	Agri S. S. Krishnamurthy	ADMK	89,629	41.86	P. S. T. Saravanan	DMK	62,889	29.37	26,740
Tiruvannamalai	66	Polur	R. Abishek	TVK	67,961	32.10	T. P. Saravanan	DMDK	67,734	31.99	227
Tiruvannamalai	67	Arani	L. Jaya Sudha	ADMK	76,735	33.34	Mahalakshmi Govarthanan	DMK	71,104	30.89	5,631
Tiruvannamalai	68	Cheyyar	Mukkur N. Subramanian	ADMK	86,680	38.95	Dusi K Mohan	TVK	65,599	29.47	21,081
Tiruvannamalai	69	Vandavasi (SC)	S. Ambethkumar	DMK	63,805	33.37	P. Rani	ADMK	60,472	31.63	3,333
Viluppuram	70	Gingee	A. Ganeshkumar	PMK	78,201	36.10	K. S. Masthan	DMK	65,556	30.26	5,631
Viluppuram	71	Mailam	C. V. Shanmugam	ADMK	82,853	43.52	Vijay Niranjan A	TVK	52,312	27.65	30,041
Viluppuram	72	Tindivanam (SC)	Vanni Arasu	VCK	63,833	32.56	P. Arjunan	ADMK	63,099	32.19	734
Viluppuram	73	Vanur (SC)	D. Gowtham	DMK	68,873	35.85	P. Suresh	TVK	61,839	32.19	7,034
Viluppuram	74	Villupuram	R. Lakshmanan	DMK	72,982	33.88	N. Mohanraj	TVK	68,863	29.62	4,119
Viluppuram	75	Vikravandi	C. Sivakumar	PMK	69,727	33.33	Vijay Vadivel A	TVK	68,817	32.89	910
Viluppuram	76	Tirukkoyilur	S. Palanisamy	ADMK	73,033	33.61	Vijay R Bharanibalaaji	TVK	72,748	33.48	285
Kallakurichi	77	Ulundurpettai	G. R. Vasanthavel	DMK	98,471	36.34	R. Kumaraguru	ADMK	96,194	35.50	2,277
Kallakurichi	78	Rishivandiyam	K. Karthikeyan	DMK	89,711	36.34	Ashok Kumar G	TVK	84,849	34.66	4,862
Kallakurichi	79	Sankarapuram	R. Rakesh	ADMK	80,250	34.07	T. Udhayasuriyan	DMK	76,810	32.61	3,440
Kallakurichi	80	Kallakurichi (SC)	C. Arul Vignesh	TVK	81,132	32.50	S. Rajeevgandhi	ADMK	80,334	32.18	798
Salem	81	Gangavalli (SC)	A. Nallathambi	ADMK	73,167	37.20	K. Chinnadurai	DMK	58,763	29.88	14,404
Salem	82	Attur (SC)	A. P. Jayasankaran	ADMK	80,843	38.81	R. Selvabharati	TVK	65,525	31.46	15,318
Salem	83	Yercaud (ST)	P. Usharani	ADMK	87,772	34.61	J. Lakshmi Janarthanan	TVK	85,583	33.75	2,189
Salem	84	Omalur	R. Mani	ADMK	1,12,246	41.40	R. V. Adhiyamaan	TVK	97,707	36.04	14,539
Salem	85	Mettur	G. Venkatachalam	ADMK	86,498	37.43	M. Midhun Chakravarthy	DMK	67,393	29.16	19,105
Salem	86	Edappadi	Edappadi K. Palaniswamy	ADMK	1,48,933	57.67	K. Premkumar	IND	50,823	19.68	98,110
Salem	87	Sankari	S. Vetrivel	ADMK	87,342	35.83	K. Senthilkumar	TVK	77,825	31.92	9,517
Salem	88	Salem (West)	S. Lakshman	TVK	1,20,407	51.37	M. Karthe	PMK	45,540	19.43	74,867
Salem	89	Salem (North)	K. Sivakumar	TVK	85,710	40.68	R. Rajendran	DMK	71,676	34.02	14,034
Salem	90	Salem (South)	Vijay Tamilan Parthiban	TVK	91,371	43.95	M. Loganathan	DMK	58,002	27.90	33,369
Salem	91	Veerapandi	M. S. Palanivel	TVK	79,907	33.88	Sri Balaji Sugumar	ADMK	75,836	32.15	4,071
Namakkal	92	Rasipuram (SC)	Logesh Tamilselvan	TVK	74,808	36.55	S. D. Premkumar	BJP	60,297	29.46	14,511
Namakkal	93	Senthamangalam (ST)	P. Chandrasekar	TVK	68,815	32.82	C. Chandrasekaran	ADMK	66,160	31.55	2,655
Namakkal	94	Namakkal	C. S. Dilip	TVK	79,744	37.56	Sridevi P. S. Mohan	ADMK	68,736	32.38	11,008
Namakkal	95	Paramathi-Velur	S. Sekar	ADMK	61,349	32.49	K. S. Moorthiy	DMK	61,041	32.32	308
Namakkal	96	Tiruchengodu	K. G. Arunraj	TVK	79,500	41.60	R. Chandrasekar	ADMK	51,328	26.86	28,172
Namakkal	97	Kumarapalayam	C. Vijayalakshmi	TVK	81,179	39.54	P. Thangamani	ADMK	73,483	35.79	7,696
Erode	98	Erode (East)	M. Vijay Balaji	TVK	69,747	42.93	Gopinath Palaniyappan	INC	45,781	28.18	23,966
Erode	99	Erode (West)	K. K. Ananth Moghan	TVK	96,836	43.74	S. Muthusamy	DMK	74,586	33.69	22,250
Erode	100	Modakkurichi	D. Shanmugan	TVK	60,715	31.83	S. Krithika	BJP	58,285	30.55	2,430
Tiruppur	101	Dharapuram (SC)	P. Sathyabama	ADMK	81,100	40.56	T. Indirani	DMK	64,373	32.20	16,727
Tiruppur	102	Kangayam	N. S. N. Nataraj	ADMK	71,122	34.94	Mani Gounder	TVK	62,989	30.95	8,133
Erode	103	Perundurai	S. Jayakumar	ADMK	70,302	35.03	N. D. Venkatachalam	DMK	60,609	30.20	9,693
Erode	104	Bhavani	K. C. Karuppannan	ADMK	75,577	36.28	Balakrishnan	TVK	68,181	32.73	7,396
Erode	105	Anthiyur	P. Haribaskar	ADMK	60,042	32.32	M. Sivabalan	DMK	58,782	31.64	1,260
Erode	106	Gobichettipalayam	K. A. Sengottaiyan	TVK	82,612	37.60	N. Nallasivam	DMK	58,782	31.64	16,620
Erode	107	Bhavanisagar (SC)	V. P. Tamilselvi	TVK	72,391	33.73	A. Bannari	ADMK	67,822	31.60	4,569
Nilgiris	108	Udhagamandalam	M. Bhojarajan	BJP	48,488	32.61	R. Ibrahim	TVK	47,512	31.95	976
Nilgiris	109	Gudalur (SC)	M. Thiravidamani	DMK	65,590	43.37	Pon Jayaseelan	ADMK	42,757	28.27	22,833
Nilgiris	110	Coonoor	M. Raju	DMK	50,470	35.69	A. Ramu	ADMK	42,371	29.97	8,099
Coimbatore	111	Mettupalayam	N. Sunil Anand	TVK	75,564	30.97	S. M. T. Kavitha Kalyanasundaram	DMK	67,896	27.79	7,768
Tiruppur	112	Avanashi (SC)	Kamali. S.	TVK	84,209	36.36	L. Murugan	BJP	68,836	29.72	15,373
Tiruppur	113	Tiruppur (North)	V. Sathyabama	TVK	1,31,401	49.88	M. S. M. Anandan	ADMK	61,409	23.31	69,992
Tiruppur	114	Tiruppur (South)	S. Balamurugan	TVK	73,793	41.04	N. Dineshkumar	DMK	60,892	33.86	12,901
Tiruppur	115	Palladam	K. Ramkumar	TVK	1,21,297	40.30	K. P. Paramasivam	ADMK	83,400	27.71	37,897
Coimbatore	116	Sulur	N. M. Sukumar	TVK	90,531	33.10	V. P. Kandasamy	ADMK	85,741	31.34	4,790
Coimbatore	117	Kavundampalayam	Kanimozhi Santhosh	TVK	1,46,466	40.24	P. R. G. Arunkumar	ADMK	1,04,326	28.66	42,140
Coimbatore	118	Coimbatore (North)	V. Sampathkumar	TVK	92,500	40.24	Senthil Selvan Durai Devaraj	DMK	70,508	31.18	21,992
Coimbatore	119	Thondamuthur	S. P. Velumani	ADMK	93,316	36.09	K. P. R. Sathish	TVK	78,591	30.40	14,725
Coimbatore	120	Coimbatore (South)	V. Senthilbalaji	DMK	59,724	38.16	V. Senthilkumar	TVK	57,453	36.71	2,271
Coimbatore	121	Singanallur	K. S. Sri Giri Prasath	TVK	84,163	38.08	V. Srinidhi	INC	65,024	29.42	21,992
Coimbatore	122	Kinathukadavu	K. Vignesh	TVK	99,950	37.31	K. V. K. S. Sabari Karthikeyan	DMK	88,240	32.94	11,710
Coimbatore	123	Pollachi	K. Nithyanandhan	DMK	62,013	34.22	V. Jayaraman	ADMK	57,386	31.67	4,627
Coimbatore	124	Valparai (SC)	A. Sudhakar	DMK	57,671	36.34	A. Sridharan	TVK	45,300	30.11	9,371
Tiruppur	125	Udumalaipettai	M. Jayakumar	DMK	68,549	33.67	K. Radhakrishnan	ADMK	65,667	32.26	2,882
Tiruppur	126	Madathukulam	R. Jayaramakrishnan	DMK	70,458	37.43	C. Shanmugavelu	AMMK	54,490	28.95	15,968
Dindigul	127	Palani	K. Ravimanoharan	ADMK	66,986	32.11	M. Praveen Kumar	TVK	66,293	31.78	693
Dindigul	128	Oddanchatram	R. Sakkarapani	DMK	93,099	46.17	Vidiyal S. Sekar	BJP	43,249	24.72	43,249
Dindigul	129	Athoor	I. Periyasamy	DMK	1,06,240	44.79	N. Kalaiselvi	TVK	83,872	35.36	22,348
Dindigul	130	Nilakottai (SC)	R. Ayyanar	TVK	68,580	34.71	S. Nagajothi	DMK	65,655	33.23	2,925
Dindigul	131	Natham	Natham R. Viswanathan	ADMK	85,708	35.84	K. Selvakumar	DMK	73,839	30.88	11,869
Dindigul	132	Dindigul	I. P. Senthil Kumar	DMK	57,671	35.13	G. Nazeer Raja	TVK	73,358	34.60	1,131
Dindigul	133	Vedasandur	T. Saminathan	DMK	84,948	37.50	V. P. B. Paramasivam	ADMK	74,885	33.05	10,063
Karur	134	Aravakurichi	R. Elango	DMK	70,827	39.11	P. Karthikeyan	TVK	51,445	28.41	19,382
Karur	135	Karur	M. R. Vijayabhaskar	ADMK	71,542	32.99	V. P. Mathiyalagan	TVK	69,721	32.15	1,821
Karur	136	Krishnarayapuram (SC)	Sathya. M.	TVK	62,378	32.94	S. Dhivya	ADMK	58,875	31.09	3,503
Karur	137	Kulithalai	Suriyanur A. Chandran	DMK	68,138	32.59	G. Balasubramani	TVK	67,559	32.31	579
Tiruchirappalli	138	Manapaarai	R. Kathiravan	TVK	83,041	34.43	P. L. Vijayakumar	ADMK	81,615	33.83	1,426
Tiruchirappalli	139	Srirangam	S. Ramesh	TVK	1,03,235	40.49	S. Durairaj	DMK	69,645	27.31	33,590
Tiruchirappalli	140	Tiruchirappalli (West)	K. N. Nehru	DMK	88,235	44.94	G. Ramamoorthy	TVK	83,449	42.50	4,786
Tiruchirappalli	141	Tiruchirappalli (East)	C. Joseph Vijay	TVK	91,381	50.07	Inigo S. Irudayaraj	DMK	63,965	35.05	27,416
Tiruchirappalli	142	Thiruverumbur	Navalpattu S. Viji	TVK	89,837	42.06	Anbil Mahesh Poyyamozhi	DMK	81,132	37.99	8,705
Tiruchirappalli	143	Lalgudi	Leema Rose Martin	ADMK	60,795	32.82	Ku. Pa. Krishnan	TVK	58,056	31.35	2,739
Tiruchirappalli	144	Manachanallur	S. Kathiravan	DMK	81,447	38.82	V. Saravanan	TVK	69,083	32.93	12,364
Tiruchirappalli	145	Musiri	M. Vignesh	TVK	71,281	37.69	N. S. Karunairaaja	DMK	53,839	28.47	17,442
Tiruchirappalli	146	Thuraiyur (SC)	M. Ravisankar	TVK	66,263	35.93	E. Saroja	ADMK	56,649	30.72	9,614
Perambalur	147	Perambalur (SC)	K. Sivakumar	TVK	90,882	35.83	S. T. Jayalakshmi	DMK	76,489	30.15	14,393
Perambalur	148	Kunnam	S. S. Sivasankar	DMK	87,237	37.84	A. Saranya	ADMK	71,680	31.09	15,557
Ariyalur	149	Ariyalur	S. Rajendran	ADMK	95,219	40.37	Latha Balu	DMK	70,721	29.98	24,498
Ariyalur	150	Jayankondam	G. Vaithilingam	PMK	88,992	38.94	Ka. So. Ka. Kannan	DMK	70,502	30.85	18,490
Cuddalore	151	Tittakudi	C. V. Ganesan	DMK	63,106	35.91	A. Rajasekar	TVK	60,477	34.41	2,629
Cuddalore	152	Virudhachalam	Premalatha Vijayakanth	DMDK	69,351	33.15	S. Vijay	TVK	66,964	32.01	2,387
Cuddalore	153	Neyveli	R. Rajendran	ADMK	63,731	37.76	Saba Rajendran	DMK	52,769	31.26	10,962
Cuddalore	154	Panruti	K. Mohan	ADMK	78,398	37.20	A. R. Abdur Rahman	VCK	67,735	32.14	10,663
Cuddalore	155	Cuddalore	B. Rajkumar	TVK	70,856	37.22	A. S. Chandrasekaran	INC	55,337	29.07	15,519
Cuddalore	156	Kurinjipadi	M. R. K. Panneerselvam	DMK	76,695	35.84	A. Bhuvanenthiran	ADMK	71,680	32.30	7,589
Cuddalore	157	Bhuvanagiri	A. Arunmozhithevan	ADMK	75,707	36.52	Durai K. Saravanan	DMK	73,220	35.32	2,487
Cuddalore	158	Chidambaram	Thamimum Ansari	DMK	69,739	35.48	K. A. Pandian	ADMK	63,992	32.55	5,747
Cuddalore	159	Kattumannarkoil (SC)	L. E. Jothimani	VCK	85,179	45.33	A. Sozhan	PMK	52,116	27.74	33,063
Mayiladuthurai	160	Sirkazhi (SC)	R. Senthilselvan	DMK	71,449	35.64	M. Sakthi	ADMK	60,032	29.95	11,417
Mayiladuthurai	161	Mayiladuthurai	Jamal Mohamed Younoos	INC	67,189	36.09	A.M. Palanisamy	PMK	57,166	30.33	10,845
Mayiladuthurai	162	Poompuhar	Nivedha M. Murugan	DMK	81,096	36.98	Pavunraj. S	ADMK	72,836	33.21	8,260
Nagapattinam	163	Nagapattinam	M. H. Jawahirullah	DMK	56,305	37.21	M. Sugumar	TVK	46,524	30.74	9,781
Nagapattinam	164	Kilvelur (SC)	T. Latha	CPI(M)	56,108	37.00	P. Senthil Pandian	TVK	53,830	35.50	2,278
Nagapattinam	165	Vedaranyam	O. S. Manian	ADMK	59,172	36.48	M. Pugazhendi	DMK	51,841	31.96	7,331
Tiruvarur	166	Thiruthuraipoondi (SC)	K. Marimuthu	CPI	74,062	38.77	S. Pandiyan	TVK	61,140	32.01	12,922
Tiruvarur	167	Mannargudi	S. Kamaraj	AMMK	68,416	35.25	T. R. Baalu Rajaa	DMK	66,850	34.44	1,566
Tiruvarur	168	Thiruvarur	Kalaivanan Poondi. K.	DMK	93,408	42.87	Veeramani. V.	TVK	75,260	34.54	18,148
Tiruvarur	169	Nannilam	R. Kamaraj	ADMK	1,03,462	44.70	Mohamed Mubarak	SDPI	61,738	26.68	41,724
Thanjavur	170	Thiruvidaimarudur (SC)	Govi. Chezhian	DMK	79,951	38.26	S. Prabakaran	TVK	65,835	31.51	14,116
Thanjavur	171	Kumbakonam	R. Vinoth	TVK	78,650	37.96	G. Anbalagan	DMK	76,932	37.43	679
Thanjavur	172	Papanasam	A. M. Shahjahan	IUML	69,284	33.35	Azarudeen Uduman Ali	TVK	68,219	32.84	1,065
Thanjavur	173	Thiruvaiyaru	Durai. Chandrasekaran	DMK	80,425	36.21	Mathi Manikandan	TVK	71,870	32.36	8,555
Thanjavur	174	Thanjavur	R. Vijaysaravanan	TVK	87,705	44.12	Ramanathan	DMK	70,750	35.59	16,955
Thanjavur	175	Orathanadu	R. Vaithilingam	DMK	86,759	44.42	Dr. K. Arvind	TVK	51,731	26.49	35,028
Thanjavur	176	Pattukkottai	K. Annadurai	DMK	65,963	35.90	C. Mathan	TVK	52,209	28.41	13,754
Thanjavur	177	Peravurani	N. Ashokkumar	DMK	60,919	34.56	Govi Elango	ADMK	57,757	32.77	3,162
Pudukkottai	178	Gandarvakottai (SC)	N. Subramanian	TVK	58,795	35.08	C. Uthayakumar	BJP	47,756	28.49	11,039
Pudukkottai	179	Viralimalai	Vijayabaskar. C.	ADMK	1,05,773	51.87	Murugesan. P.	TVK	43,700	21.43	62,073
Pudukkottai	180	Pudukkottai	V. Muthuraja	DMK	66,825	35.10	K. M. Shariff	TVK	64,958	34.12	1,867
Pudukkottai	181	Thirumayam	S. Regupathy	DMK	58,201	31.87	Chinthamani. C.	TVK	56,709	31.05	1,492
Pudukkottai	182	Alangudi	Siva V. Meyyanathan	DMK	64,929	35.98	Kandasamy	TVK	51,952	28.78	12,977
Pudukkottai	183	Aranthangi	J. Mohamed Farvas	TVK	73,244	40.08	T. Ramachandran	INC	63,182	34.58	10,062
Sivaganga	184	Karaikudi	Dr. T. K. Prabhu	TVK	1,01,358	44.21	S. Mangudi	INC	55,284	24.11	46,074
Sivaganga	185	Tiruppattur	Srinivasa Sethupathi	TVK	83,375	38.65	K. R. Periyakaruppan	DMK	83,374	38.65	1
Sivaganga	186	Sivaganga	Kulanthai Rani	TVK	73,737	35.45	P. R. Senthilnathan	ADMK	58,656	27.40	15,081
Sivaganga	187	Manamadurai (SC)	D. Elangovan	TVK	69,971	33.54	A. Tamilarasi	DMK	68,763	32.96	1,208
Madurai	188	Melur	P. Viswanathan	INC	60,080	31.50	A. Maduraiveeran	TVK	57,356	30.07	2,724
Madurai	189	Madurai East	S. Karthikeyan	TVK	1,18,777	43.74	P. Moorthy	DMK	1,02,230	37.64	16,547
Madurai	190	Sholavandan (SC)	M. V. Karuppiah	TVK	63,907	33.80	A. Venkatesan	DMK	61,229	32.38	2,678
Madurai	191	Madurai North	A. Kallanai	TVK	72,853	45.03	G. Thalapathi	DMK	54,815	33.88	18,038
Madurai	192	Madurai South	M. M. Gopison	TVK	62,415	44.11	M. Boominathan	DMK	40,886	28.89	21,529
Madurai	193	Madurai Central	Madhar Badhurudeen	TVK	63,414	42.68	Palanivel Thiaga Rajan	DMK	44,286	29.80	19,128
Madurai	194	Madurai West	S. R. Thangapandi	TVK	88,250	40.78	R. Balaji	DMK	76,319	35.27	11,931
Madurai	195	Thiruparankundram	C. T. R. Nirmal Kumar	TVK	1,14,316	44.75	Kiruthiga Thangapandi	DMK	72,763	28.48	41,553
Madurai	196	Thirumangalam	Sedapatti M. Manimaran	DMK	88,291	38.22	R. B. Udhayakumar	ADMK	64,484	27.92	23,807
Madurai	197	Usilampatti	M. Vijay	TVK	65,743	29.34	I. Mahendran	ADMK	63,938	28.54	1,805
Theni	198	Andipatti	A. Maharajan	DMK	74,324	34.20	V. Pandi	TVK	64,770	29.80	9,554
Theni	199	Periyakulam (SC)	G. Sabari Iyngaran	TVK	85,656	40.56	P. Sakthivel	VCK	66,335	31.41	19,321
Theni	200	Bodinayakanur	O. Panneerselvam	DMK	85,206	38.62	S. Prakash	TVK	78,401	35.54	6,805
Theni	201	Cumbum	P. L. A. Jeganathmishra	TVK	85,394	40.55	N. Eramakrishnan	DMK	84,643	40.20	751
Virudhunagar	202	Rajapalayam	K. Jegadeshwari	TVK	65,548	35.81	S. Thangapandian	DMK	54,943	30.02	10,605
Virudhunagar	203	Srivilliputhur (SC)	A. Karthik	TVK	65,653	33.93	P. Mahalingam	DMK	57,702	29.50	8,581
Virudhunagar	204	Sattur	A. Kadarkarairaj	DMK	62,060	31.23	Nainar Nagendran	BJP	56,071	28.21	5,989
Virudhunagar	205	Sivakasi	S. Keerthana	TVK	68,709	35.51	G. Ashokan	INC	57,039	29.47	11,670
Virudhunagar	206	Virudhunagar	P. Selvam	TVK	63,653	37.93	Vijaya Prabhakar	DMDK	54,262	32.33	9,391
Virudhunagar	207	Aruppukkottai	Sattur Ramachandran	DMK	65,104	36.49	K. Karthik Kumar	TVK	60,161	33.72	4,943
Virudhunagar	208	Tiruchuli	Thangam Thennarasu	DMK	75,085	41.43	S. Samayan	TVK	61,600	33.99	13,485
Ramanathapuram	209	Paramakudi (SC)	K. K. Kathiravan	DMK	59,161	31.18	G. Gopirajan	TVK	55,613	29.31	3,548
Ramanathapuram	210	Tiruvadanai	Rajeev	TVK	69,551	31.57	R. M. Karumanikam	INC	67,038	30.43	2,513
Ramanathapuram	211	Ramanathapuram	Katharbatcha Muthuramalingam	DMK	89,137	37.52	Shahul Hameed	TVK	76,678	32.28	12,459
Ramanathapuram	212	Mudhukulathur	R. S. Raja Kannappan	DMK	68,003	29.39	B. Malarvizhi	TVK	51,405	22.22	16,598
Thoothukudi	213	Vilathikulam	G. V. Markandayan	DMK	58,395	33.40	P. Kasiram	TVK	50,167	28.70	8,228
Thoothukudi	214	Thoothukkudi	Srinath Alnath	TVK	1,00,536	49.11	P. Geetha Jeevan	DMK	62,805	30.68	37,731
Thoothukudi	215	Tiruchendur	Anitha R. Radhakrishnan	DMK	72,723	39.09	J. Murugan	TVK	66,851	35.93	5,872
Thoothukudi	216	Srivaikuntam	G. Saravanan	TVK	58,814	33.34	S. P. Shunmuganathan	AIADMK	57,628	32.67	1,186
Thoothukudi	217	Ottapidaram (SC)	P. Mathanraja	TVK	81,625	41.62	P. M. Ramajeyam	DMK	52,542	26.79	29,083
Thoothukudi	218	Kovilpatti	K. Karunanithi	DMK	61,643	31.74	S. Balasubramanian	TVK	60,800	31.30	843
Tenkasi	219	Sankarankovil (SC)	Dhilipan Jaishankar	ADMK	64,865	33.01	C. Ramarajan	TVK	58,376	29.71	6,489
Tenkasi	220	Vasudevanallur (SC)	E. Raja	DMK	63,045	33.22	Ananthan Ayyasamy	BJP	56,462	29.75	6,583
Tenkasi	221	Kadayanallur	T. M. Rajendran	DMK	79,832	35.97	C. Krishnamurali	ADMK	73,579	33.15	6,253
Tenkasi	222	Tenkasi	Kalai Kathiravan	DMK	79,699	33.92	S. Selvamohandas Pandian	ADMK	69,400	29.53	10,299
Tenkasi	223	Alangulam	Paul Manoj Pandian	DMK	69,170	31.32	K. R. P. Prabakaran	ADMK	61,372	27.79	7,798
Tirunelveli	224	Tirunelveli	R. S. Murughan	TVK	75,840	34.72	S. Subramanian	DMK	64,426	29.50	11,414
Tirunelveli	225	Ambasamudram	E. Subaya	ADMK	65,589	34.30	V. P. Durai	INC	55,344	28.95	10,245
Tirunelveli	226	Palayamkottai	M. Abdul Wahab	DMK	79,744	44.15	Maria John	TVK	65,939	36.51	13,805
Tirunelveli	227	Nanguneri	Reddiarpatti V. Narayanan	TVK	74,952	35.79	Ruby R. Manoharan	INC	58,533	27.95	16,419
Tirunelveli	228	Radhapuram	Sathish Christopher	TVK	69,947	34.99	M. Appavu	DMK	57,634	28.83	12,313
Kanyakumari	229	Kanniyakumari	N. Thalavai Sundaram	ADMK	75,045	31.38	R. Mahesh	DMK	74,831	31.29	214
Kanyakumari	230	Nagercoil	S. Austin	DMK	69,880	35.60	G. Bervin Kings	TVK	62,310	31.75	7,570
Kanyakumari	231	Colachal	Tharahai Cuthbert	INC	66,207	33.27	Prem Alex Lawrence	TVK	63,374	31.84	2,833
Kanyakumari	232	Padmanabhapuram	R. Chellaswamy	CPI(M)	68,938	38.18	S. Krishna Kumar	TVK	53,369	29.56	15,569
Kanyakumari	233	Vilavancode	T. T. Praveen	INC	70,755	40.45	K. Michael Kumar	TVK	49,785	28.46	20,970
Kanyakumari	234	Killiyoor	S. Rajeshkumar	INC	66,434	37.42	S. Sabin	TVK	65,123	36.68	1,311

=== Strike Rate ===
Strike rate is determined by calculating the number of seats won by a party of the number of seats it contested.

Alliance/ Party		Seats contested	Seats Won	Strike Rate
TVK+	TVK	233	108	46.35%
TVK+	IND	1	0	0.00%
TVK+	Total	234	108	46.15%
SPA	DMK	176	59	33.52%
SPA	INC	28	5	17.86%
SPA	DMDK	10	1	10.00%
SPA	VCK	8	2	25.00%
SPA	CPI	5	2	40.00%
SPA	CPI(M)	5	2	40.00%
SPA	IUML	2	2	100.00%
SPA	Total	234	73	31.20%
ADMK+	AIADMK	172	47	27.32%
ADMK+	BJP	33	1	3.03%
ADMK+	PMK	18	4	22.22%
ADMK+	AMMK	11	1	9.09%
ADMK+	Total	234	53	22.65%

=== Analysis ===
Tamilaga Vettri Kazhagam (TVK), a two-year-old party led by actor-turned-politician C. Joseph Vijay, won 108 of the 234 seats in the 2026 Tamil Nadu Legislative Assembly election. Analysts and media commentators noted that the party’s campaign relied heavily on digital outreach and social media platforms such as YouTube, Instagram, Facebook and WhatsApp. BBC, described the campaign as reflecting a major shift towards digital-first political mobilisation in India.

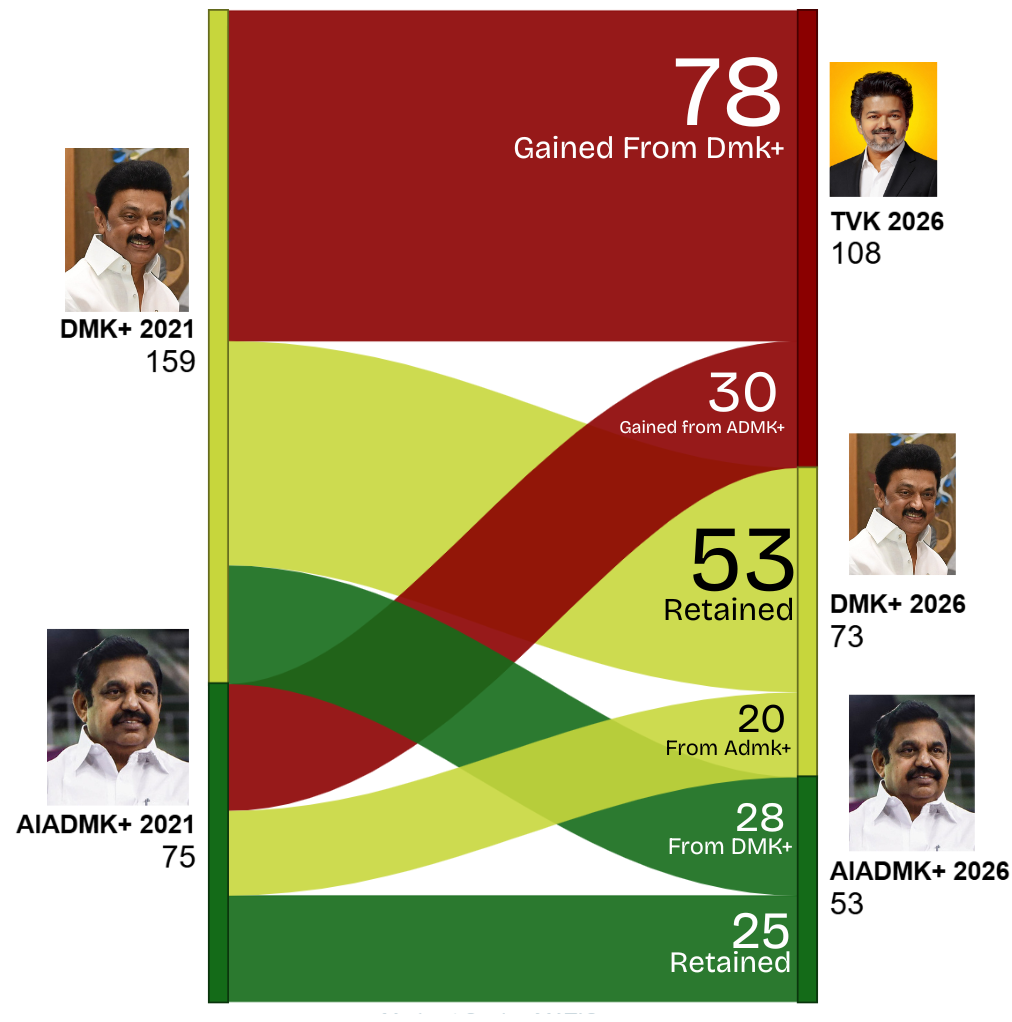
Seats Shift in Tamil Nadu

Election campaigns in India have traditionally relied on public rallies, speeches, banners, door-to-door canvassing and extensive media outreach. In Tamil Nadu, Dravidian parties such as the DMK and the AIADMK have dominated state politics for decades, with politics centred around social justice and welfare policies. During this period, Tamil Nadu also recorded strong economic and social indicators, including 11.2% economic growth in 2024–25 and continued manufacturing expansion. Political observers stated that the prolonged dominance of the major Dravidian parties contributed to growing interest in political alternatives, particularly among younger voters and Gen Z voters who were less connected to traditional political narratives and more receptive to calls for political change.

Although Vijay remained one of the most recognisable public figures in the state, he reportedly campaigned in person for less than three weeks during the election. Some campaign events were cancelled, which the party attributed to logistical constraints and time limitations. Instead of extensive physical campaigning, TVK placed significant emphasis on digital communication and online mobilisation. Vijay did not give media interviews or hold press conferences during the campaign, and his speeches were generally shorter than those of other political leaders. Much of the TVK’s outreach was conducted through social media platforms. TVK supporters and volunteers, including members of an extensive network of fan clubs, circulated campaign material, speech clips, Instagram Reels, YouTube Shorts and WhatsApp messages online. TVK’s information technology wing also played a role in producing campaign content and criticism from rival parties.

NDTV highlighted Vijay’s social media strategy, noting that he used platforms such as Instagram selectively, mainly for updates related to films, public appearances and social messaging related to elections. His online engagement was particularly strong among younger voters and women, as well as among audiences in Chennai and sections of the Tamil diaspora abroad including Istanbul. TVK received notable support from younger voters, including first-time voters. Voters between the ages of 18 and 39, who constitute a significant share of Tamil Nadu’s electorate, were considered an important support base for the party's winning of 108 seats.

The Incumbent DMK was also perceived as overconfident due to favourable internal assessments, which may have delayed timely course correction. Despite appearing arithmetically strong on paper, poor coordination among its allies, inconsistent campaign messaging, and ineffective vote transfer in several constituencies limited the alliance's electoral performance, while persistent corruption allegations, despite the absence of any major scandals, and negative public perceptions further weakened the campaign and collectively contributed to this outcome. From the outset of counting, TVK led across Chennai district and ultimately won 20 of the city's 22 constituencies, with the exception of the Chepauk-Thiruvallikeni and Harbour constituencies, (Note: One of the 2 seats that Dmk won even in 1991 wave election.) which were retained by the DMK, marking a major breakthrough in a region long considered a DMK stronghold and a historic base of the erstwhile Justice Party, the political precursor to the century-old Dravidian movement. The DMK suffered a complete rout in the neighbouring districts of Kancheepuram, Thiruvallur, Chengalpattu and Vellore. TVK swept Northern Tamil Nadu and made major inroads into Western Kongu region and Southern Tamil Nadu, regions long considered AIADMK strongholds, emerging as the principal party in these areas. TVK won 24 of the 46 reserved assembly constituencies for the scheduled communities in the state, recording major victories across western and northern Tamil Nadu, by making significant inroads into the Dalit vote base of the Dravidian parties and VCK, and became the first debutant party to secure more than half of the reserved seats, while AIADMK and DMK won nine each. Within the AIADMK-led alliance, weak vote transfer, the BJP's diminished independent momentum which it had gained in the state during the 2024 Lok Sabha election, was seen to have been lost following its renewed alignment with the AIADMK in April 2025, and the sidelining of former state unit president K. Annamalai were seen as key factors behind its poor performance, particularly among urban and younger voters amid the rise of the “Vijay factor". However, the results indicated that the AIADMK–PMK alliance had relatively worked in the alliance's favour by consolidating Vanniyar votes in parts of Northern Tamil Nadu. TVK significantly weakened both the DMK and AIADMK in the urban centres of Salem, Coimbatore, Erode, Tiruchirappalli, and Madurai. The AIADMK retained a measure of support in parts of western and northern Tamil Nadu through alliance cohesion, while the DMK performed relatively better in its traditional Cauvery delta stronghold.

Party-wise position in Assembly segments

TVK emerged as the leading party, finished first in 108 assembly segments, runner-up in 74, and third in 51 segments. DMK secured first place in 59 assembly segments, finished runner-up in 80, and placed third in 37 segments. The AIADMK won 47 of the 172 seats it contested, finished runner-up in 44 constituencies, slipped to third place in 81, and lost its deposit in 19 assembly segments. TVK and DMK did not forfeit their deposits in any of the constituencies they had contested in.

- TVK
- DMK
- AIADMK

== Government formation ==
Vijay indicated that he planned to take the oath of the Chief Minister's office on 7 May 2026 at the Nehru Stadium, Chennai. On 6 May 2026, Vijay met the Governor of Tamil Nadu, Rajendra Vishwanath Arlekar, and staked a claim to the formation of the new government. However, Arlekar asked Vijay to produce letters of support from 118 MLAs, which he thought Vijay did not have, according to media reports. Subsequently, the convoy and security protection provided to Vijay as the Chief Minister-designate were withdrawn.

=== Path to coalition ===
After the declaration of results, the TVK had emerged as the single largest party (108 seats) in the assembly but could not get the majority (118 seats), leading to a requirement of a minimum 10 additional seats. This led to a series of political maneuvering and ambiguity in Tamil Nadu's politics in the following days. American publication Variety described it as "a frantic few days of horse-trading".

The TVK, which had cited the former Tamil Nadu Chief Minister Kamarajar of the INC as one of the party's ideological icons, invited the INC MLAs to form a coalition government, which the INC accepted after leaving the DMK-led Secular Progressive Alliance, leading to the formation of the TVK-led alliance. The INC state unit Tamil Nadu Congress Committee (TNCC) forwarded Vijay's invitation to their Delhi-headquartered presidium All India Congress Committee (AICC), who sent back the decision to the state unit. The state unit decided to break ties with the DMK and support TVK conditional upon TVK never maintaining ties with the BJP. Following news that Arlekar is delaying inviting the TVK to form the government, INC's Karur MP Jothimani stated that the BJP-appointed Governor "should stop playing politics via the Raj Bhavan".

From 7 May 2026 onwards, allegations of a possible alliance between the DMK and the AIADMK, which could easily achieve a majority in the assembly, circulated in mainstream media. The DMK quickly denied the news, claiming they rejected such an offer from the AIADMK, respecting the people's mandate, and that the DMK had decided to serve as opposition, not interfering in the TVK's government formation process.

Other sources claimed that TVK is holding negotiations with the ADMK over a possible power-sharing arrangement, amidst reports that around 28 of the 47 AIADMK MLAs have been moved to a Puducherry resort, and that a faction within the AIADMK MLAs are willing to support TVK. AIADMK general secretary Palanisami is said to oppose a coalition with the TVK. It was also reported that the five INC MLAs have been moved to Hyderabad, the capital city of the INC-ruled state Telangana, and that they will return to Chennai once Arlekar invites Vijay to form government.

On 8 May 2026, the leftist parties of Tamil Nadu, consisting of CPI and CPI(M), agreed to provide their MLAs' unconditional support to the TVK, stressing on the necessity to form a government by the deadline of 10 May to prevent a President's rule which they dubbed a proxy-BJP regime. The leftist parties affirmed that they would only support "from the outside" but not participate in the government, continuing in their SPA alliance led by the DMK. Following this, Vijay once again met Arlekar, for the third time, insisting on being invited to form the state government. Vijay also submitted a letter of support from the lone MLA of AMMK to the Governor on his third visit, extending support to TVK to form the government. Subsequently, T. T. V. Dhinakaran alleged that the TVK had submitted a photocopy of a forged letter and claimed that it was an attempt at horse-trading involving the party's lone MLA. He later submitted a letter to the Governor disputing the earlier claim. TVK denied the allegation and released a video stating that the AMMK MLA had extended support to the party for government formation.

On 9 May 2026, the VCK and IUML extended unconditional support to TVK to form the government, while continuing their alliance with the DMK-led SPA. Both parties hold two MLAs each in the Assembly. With the support of the INC, along with outside support from SPA allies such as the CPI(M), CPI, VCK and IUML, TVK secured the backing of 120 MLAs, excluding one vacant seat as Vijay had contested and won from two constituencies. Subsequently, Vijay met the Governor along with alliance party leaders and staked claim to form the government. The Governor later appointed Vijay as Chief Minister-designate and directed him to seek a vote of confidence in the Assembly on or before 13 May 2026.

In a ceremony on 10 May, Vijay was sworn-in as the ninth Chief Minister of Tamil Nadu, and the thirteenth Chief Minister since the linguistic reformation of the state's boundaries in 1956.

Legislative Assembly strength by post-poll alliance
TVK+		SPA		AIADMK+	
Party	Seats	Party	Seats	Party	Seats
TVK	107	DMK	59	AIADMK	47
INC	5	DMDK	1	PMK	4
CPI(M)	2 (Note: Supporting the TVK-led government, but continued membership of the DMK-led SPA.)			BJP	1
CPI	2			AMMK	1
VCK	2				
IUML	2				
Total	120	Total	60	Total	53

=== Floor test ===
Outcome of trust vote
144	22	5	60
AYES	NOES	ABSTAIN	WALKOUT

Vote of Confidence; 13 May 2026
Ballot →	Division Vote
Required majority →	116 out of 231
Yes	144
No	22
Abstain	5
Walkout	60
Total	231

On 13 May 2026, the third day of the inaugural sessions of the 17th Tamil Nadu Legislative Assembly, the government was put through a vote of confidence as stipulated by the landmark Supreme Court ruling of S.R. Bommai v. Union of India (1994). Vijay's TVK government passed the vote comfortably with 144 ayes against 22 noes:

- The DMK's 59 MLAs and the only DMDK MLA staged a walk-out. The Speaker J. C. D. Prabhakar (from TVK) does not get to vote, besides Vijay's vacated Tiruchirapalli East seat, and the MLA, from Tirupattur, was barred from voting due to a Madras High Court order, relating to the counting of votes. The TVK loses three votes, reducing their party strength to 105.
- MLAs who voted in favor of the government are from TVK (105) and its post-poll allies (13), and 25 MLAs from the AIADMK led by Thondamuthur MLA S. P. Velumani who support Vijay rebelling against Palanisami, as well as the AMMK MLA expelled by the party for his outspoken support to Vijay. This confirmed the news reports and exposed the yet another factional split within the AIADMK.
- Those who voted against the government are the remainder of the AIADMK MLAs (22).
- 5 MLAs of the PMK (4) and BJP (1) abstained.

=== Council of Ministers ===
A preliminary State Cabinet of eight ministers, with important portfolios, took oath on 10 May alongside Vijay. It was expanded into a full-fledged Council of Ministers on 21 May. It saw the induction of INC ministers into the Tamil Nadu Cabinet after nearly 60 years. Congress MLAs Rajesh Kumar and P. Vishwanathan were sworn in as ministers. The cabinet expansion marked a record in the history of the Tamil Nadu Cabinet, with four women ministers serving at the same time. Publications reported on the caste representation within Vijay's Council of Ministers, highlighting that the cabinet included seven ministers from Scheduled Communities and both of TVK's Brahmin MLAs. On 22 May, an MLA from VCK and IUML each joined the cabinet for the first time in the state's history, taking the cabinet strength to its maximum limit of 35.

== Controversy ==
=== Voter fraud ===
Around two dozen foreign nationals were arrested for allegedly casting fraudulent votes in the Tamil Nadu Assembly election. They were accused of using fake Indian identity documents to cast votes, following which the Election Commission ordered a probe into the suspected electoral fraud.

Earlier, media reports had stated that many people were returning to Tamil Nadu from abroad to cast their votes, as the election had gained significant attention following the political entry of actor-turned-politician Vijay.

=== Further strife in the AIADMK ===
On 25 May 2026, three AIADMK MLAs who were part of the Velumani faction, namely K. Maragatham (Madurantakam), S. Jayakumar, (Perundurai), and P. Sathyabama (Dharapuram), resigned their seats and joined the TVK. With this, the AIADMK's strength in the assembly dropped to 44. Palanisami and T. T. V. Dhinakaran accused the TVK government of blatant horse-trading.

On 26 May, Ambasamudram's AIADMK MLA and former minister E. Subbaiah also resigned his seat in a similar vein, bringing down the party's strength to 43. All of these four constituencies are expected to undergo by-polls eventually.

On May 27, the rival factions of the AIADMK reconciled, with Velumani acknowledging Palanisami's leadership of the party. Both the factions withdrew the disqualification petitions they had submitted to the Speaker earlier. Velumani denied the claims that his faction was supporting the TVK in hope of ministerial positions within the government. The Economic Times opined that the resignations are part of TVK's attempts to gain an absolute majority in the assembly.

=== Miscellaneous ===
Within a month of assuming power in the state, the TVK government was criticized and scrutinized for various issues:

- The Tamil Thaai Vaazhthu, the State Anthem of Tamil Nadu, was played at the end rather than the beginning during the ministerial oath ceremonies sparking widespread backlash from TVK's allies and opposition groups.
- On 12 May 2026, the Tamil Nadu government appointed astrologer and TVK spokesperson as Officer-on-Special Duty (Political) to Chief Minister Vijay. The appointment drew criticism from several political parties and alliance partners. The government revoked the order the following day.
- The TVK expelled a Vellore functionary, T.R. Vijayakumar, after residents and workers protested against alleged ₹1 lakh monthly extortion demands from local brick kiln operators.
- A petition filed in the Madras High Court, the apex court of Tamil Nadu, alleged that the Chief Minister Vijay was deliberately excluded from the FIR concerning the fatal September 2025 stampede at a Karur TVK rally, in order to shield him from political negligence charges.
- The government abruptly cancelled a ₹16.83 lakh tender for a Kanchipuram water tank project after it was discovered bidders were given a six-hour window, drawing accusations from the DMK of favoring specific contractors.
- The TVK government under Vijay faced severe backlash over the state's deteriorating law and order situation, specifically following a series of brutal crimes involving minors and women.

== By-polls ==
Date	Constituency		Previous MLA	Party	Date of resignation	Reason	Elected MLA	Party
6 October 2026	35	Maduranthakam	Maragatham Kumaravel	ADMK	25 May 2026	Defected to TVK.	Maragatham Kumaravel	TVK
6 October 2026	101	Dharapuram	P. Sathyabama	ADMK	25 May 2026	Defected to TVK.	P. Sathyabama	TVK
TBD	103	Perundurai	S. Jayakumar	ADMK	25 May 2026	Defected to TVK.		
TBD	135	Karur	M. R. Vijayabhaskar	ADMK	29 June 2026	Defected to TVK.		
TBD	141	Tiruchirappalli East	C. Joseph Vijay	TVK	10 May 2026	Contested and won two seats		
TBD	179	Viralimalai	C. Vijayabaskar	ADMK	16 June 2026	Defected to TVK.		
TBD	225	Ambasamudram	E. Subaya	ADMK	26 May 2026	Defected to TVK.		
TBD	13	Kolathur	V. S. Babu	TVK	19 November 2026	Death of MLA V. S. Babu		

== See also ==
- 2026 elections in India
- 2026 Puducherry Legislative Assembly election – Election to the legislative assembly of Puducherry
- Elections in Tamil Nadu – Overview of the procedure of elections in the Indian state of Tamil Nadu
- Politics of Tamil Nadu – Politics related to the Indian state of Tamil Nadu
