= R. Manoharan =

Indian politician

R. Manoharan is an Indian politician and was a member of the 14th Tamil Nadu Legislative Assembly from the Tiruchirappalli East constituency. He represented the All India Anna Dravida Munnetra Kazhagam party. He was appointed as chief government whip in February 2013.

He unsuccessfully contested from Srirangam in 2026 Tamil Nadu Legislative Assembly election.
