= C. S. Dilip =

Dilip C.S. is an Indian politician and a Member of the Tamil Nadu Legislative Assembly. He hails from Namakkal town in Namakkal district. He pursued his Bachelor of Commerce degree at PSG College of Arts and Science in Coimbatore and graduated from Bharathiar University, Coimbatore, in 2014. A member of the Tamizhaga Vettri Kazhagam party, he contested the 2026 Tamil Nadu Legislative Assembly election from the Namakkal Assembly constituency, won, and became a Member of the Legislative Assembly.

== Electoral Performance ==
2026 Tamil Nadu Legislative Assembly election: Namakkal
Party	Candidate	Votes	%	±%
TVK	Dilip C.S	79,744	37.56	New
AIADMK	Sridevi Mohan P.S	68,736	32.38	▼5.89
DMK	Rani P	52,808	24.88	▼26.95
NTK	Praveenkumar K	6,286	2.96	▼1.97
NOTA	NOTA	760	0.36	▼0.27
Independent	Chandra P	322	0.15	New
Samaniya Makkal Nala Katchi	Thiyagarajan R	320	0.15	New
BSP	Ramasamy P	296	0.14	New
Anna Puratchi Thalaivar Amma Dravida Munnetra Kazhagam	Aadithiyan A	279	0.13	New
Independent	Natarajan M	225	0.11	New
Ahimsa Socialist Party	Gandhian Ramesh T	213	0.10	New
Independent	Abineshkumar T	213	0.10	New
Independent	Aravinth S	193	0.09	New
Independent	Manikandan R	191	0.09	New
Independent	Muthusamy S	179	0.08	New
Independent	Jayakumar R	168	0.08	New
Independent	Kanakaraj K	159	0.07	New
All India Puratchi Thalaivar Makkal Munnetra Kazhagam	Palanisamy M.P	149	0.07	New
PT	Matheswaran C	146	0.07	New
Ganasangam Party of India	Sureshkannan P	146	0.07	New
Independent	Ramesh A	114	0.05	New
Independent	Jayaraman M	113	0.05	New
Independent	Mohan P	111	0.05	New
Independent	Stalin R	99	0.05	New
Anaithinthiya Anna Dravida Makkal Seyal Katchi	Mahendran P	96	0.05	New
Independent	Netajikaviarasu V	92	0.04	New
Independent	Mohan S	71	0.03	New
Independent	Mohan M	54	0.03	New
Margin of victory		11,008	5.18	▼8.38
Turnout		2,12,283	89.23	▲9.52
Registered electors		2,37,915		▼19,856
TVK gain from DMK		Swing	▲37.56	
