= 2025 Karur crowd crush =

Crowd crush in Tamil Nadu, India

- Date: 27 September 2025
- Time: c. 7:40 p.m. (IST)
- Location: Veluswamypuram, Karur district, Tamil Nadu, India
- Type: Crowd crush
- Cause: Overcrowding; alleged delay by event organisers
- Organized by: Tamilaga Vettri Kazhagam
- Deaths: 41
- Injuries: 83–124

On 27 September 2025, at least 41 people were killed and around 100 others were injured in a crowd crush during a political rally in Karur district, Tamil Nadu, India. The rally was hosted by C. Joseph Vijay, the founder and president of the Tamilaga Vettri Kazhagam (TVK). The crowd crush happened in Velusamypuram on the Karur–Erode highway, when large sections of the crowd surged towards Vijay in an attempt to catch a glimpse of his convoy after his arrival was delayed by nearly seven hours.

Political leaders across the country expressed their condolences; the union and state governments, along with various political parties, announced compensation for the families of the deceased and injured. Tamil Nadu's chief minister M. K. Stalin formed a one-member commission to investigate the incident.

The Tamil Nadu Police accused the TVK's leadership of ignoring their advice and failing to take adequate precautions; they also alleged that Vijay had violated police-issued regulations and traffic rules. The Karur police department filed a first information report and initiated criminal proceedings against various TVK leaders, including the general secretary N. Anand.

== Background ==
C. Joseph Vijay, a prominent Tamil film actor, launched the regional political party Tamilaga Vettri Kazhagam (TVK) on 2 February 2024. Following the second party conference in Madurai on 21 August 2025, he established a tour schedule of visiting two districts each weekend.

Vijay began his campaign for the 2026 Tamil Nadu Legislative Assembly election on 13 September 2025 with a rally in Trichy. Despite TVK general secretary N. Anand asking cadres and attendees to follow the safety guidelines issued by the Madras High Court, in Trichy, cadres were reported pushing away barriers to get close to Vijay, his campaign vehicle was followed by both party members and supporters, attendees climbed onto vertical structures to see him, crowd surges slowed down his arrival at the venue by over four hours, and several people who had waited since the early morning required medical attention. City traffic was disrupted and the behaviour of attendees who pushed towards Vijay's campaign vehicle raised concerns about the risk of crowd crush. "Dozens" of injuries were later said by official sources to have occurred at this and subsequent rallies in Ariyalur and Tiruvarur, with one death in Villupuram and two in Madurai.

Starting the second leg of his tour on 20 September, Vijay criticised the Dravida Munnetra Kazhagam-led state government of M. K. Stalin for "excessive restrictions" on meeting his supporters and warned that he would "seek permission directly from the people". He alleged that the government was responsible for cutting his microphone wire in Trichy and cutting power during his event in Ariyalur, and accused it of "granting [venues] where crises are already brewing".

On 27 September 2025, Vijay was to campaign in Velusamypuram, a village on the Karur–Erode highway in Karur district in Tamil Nadu. The meeting in Karur was originally scheduled for 13 December 2025 as part of Vijay's statewide tour plan. However, the schedule was revised, and the Karur meeting was rescheduled to 27 September 2025. The change was announced on 24 September 2025, a few days before the meeting. Notably, the DMK had held its Mupperum Vizha (Grand Festival of Three Achievements) event in Karur on 17 September 2025.

According to the Government of Tamil Nadu, the organisers had obtained permission to conduct a rally with a maximum of 10,000 people in attendance; however, as per government estimates and eyewitness accounts, about 27,000 people were estimated to have arrived at the venue prior to Vijay's rally speech. The Director General of the Tamil Nadu Police, G. Venkataraman, said that the police were expecting 20,000 attendees; however, his deputy, Davidson Devasirvatham, said that they were expecting 15,000 people and had deployed 500 policemen. The Hindustan Times cited local reports, which said that 30,000 attendees were anticipated but the rally drew double that number, and Puthiya Thalaimurai gave the attendance as exceeding 50,000.

The venue, said to have been used for similar events in the past, was assigned to the organisers by the state police. The All India Anna Dravida Munnetra Kazhagam (AIADMK) general secretary Edappadi K. Palaniswami held his rally there two days prior. It had a seating capacity of 60,000 over an area of 11,000 m2. The police had rejected the proposed locations in Karur town, describing them as "thickly populated business areas".

According to Venkataraman, the police department had given permission for a gathering between 3 p.m. and 10 p.m. The TVK announced that Vijay would arrive at noon, and supporters and party cadre began gathering at the venue from 11 a.m. According to the police report, the crowd had been gathering since 10 a.m., and another source mentioned 9 a.m. The large crowd was exposed to hot weather conditions, and there was a scarcity of food, water and basic amenities. Attendees, who included families with children and – unusually for political rallies in Tamil Nadu – young women, awaited Vijay's convoy for hours; many skipped meals to maintain their positions. Witnesses later reported seeing fainting, dehydration, and restlessness before the rally began, with ambulance rescue operations launched by 6 p.m. Several people had reportedly collapsed near Vijay's campaign vehicle.

Vijay was slated to speak in Namakkal (an hour's drive away from Karur) at 8:45 a.m. However, the event was delayed till 2 p.m., and he left for Karur half an hour later. He entered the Karur district at 4:45 p.m., and reached the event venue after dark at 7 p.m.; according to Venkataraman, he only arrived at 7:40 p.m. Vijay, who was said by police to have held multiple receptions for supporters along his route, required a police escort as crowds awaited him by the roadside and there were few barriers. At least 5,000 supporters followed him in their own vehicles from Namakkal to Velusamypuram, against police advice.

== Incident ==
As per eyewitnesses, the fatal crowd crush happened around 7:45 p.m., when large sections of the crowd surged toward the stage barricades. Three separate crowd crushes were reported during the rally; the first caused by attendees trying to see Vijay (who did not turn on his customary spotlight), the second by attendees' attempts to hear him after his microphone failed, and the final crush by attendees chasing his departing bus.

The TVK party members and attendees formed vehicular convoys in front of and behind Vijay's campaign vehicle, blocking the roads. Once the campaign vehicle arrived at the rally venue, the crowd was forced to make way, leading to a crush. The crush was triggered near a shed housing a generator and a television broadcast van, where people were pushed and subsequently trampled underfoot. A lack of buffer zones around the stage caused people to press closer, increasing overcrowding and pressure points.

During the chaos, Vijay paused his speech; he addressed the crowd, distributed water bottles, requested the crowd make way for an ambulance, and called out for a missing child before resuming. Police and volunteers were unable to control the surge, and ambulances faced difficulties navigating the congested area; volunteers eventually formed human chains to carve pathways for the injured. Several attendees fainted due to hyperthermia and the density of the crowd, with some children reportedly becoming separated from their families. One survivor said that an ambulance had repeatedly made U-turns in the crowd, contributing to the severity of the crush. Multiple sources reported that TVK supporters had obstructed ambulances and confronted their drivers during the rescue operation, which reportedly caused a delay in obtaining medical attention for the victims. Survivors and witnesses cited poor planning, insufficient security personnel, and inadequate crowd control measures as key factors contributing to the tragedy.

Initial reports cited about 10 deaths, but the toll rose to 41, including a two-year-old toddler, at least nine children, 18 women and 13 men. Most of the victims were in their 20s and 30s. At least 83 others sustained crush injuries ranging from fractures to suffocation, and many were admitted to hospitals in Karur and nearby districts.

== Response and investigation ==
Following the incident, emergency services were deployed to the site, and ambulances transported the injured to nearby hospitals. At least 44 doctors from the neighboring districts of Salem and Tiruchirappalli were sent to Karur to treat the injured. The Karur district administration established helplines to assist families seeking information about the victims.

The State government formed a single-member commission consisting of retired Madras High Court judge Aruna Jagadeesan to investigate the crowd crush. The Tamil Nadu police registered a case and conducted forensic investigations at multiple sites including a sewer where multiple bodies were found. According to the first information report filed by the Karur Town police, the TVK organisers had deliberately delayed Vijay's appearance by four hours with the intention of "exhibiting political strength", ignored advice and failed to take adequate precautions. It also alleged that Vijay, who entered the Karur district at 4:45 p.m., had violated issued conditions and traffic rules by stopping along the way to "indulge in a roadshow without permission", and sought to delay his arrival himself.

On 28 September, key members of the TVK including general secretary N. Anand, joint secretary C.T. Nirmal Kumar, and Karur district secretary Mathiazhagan were booked under the Bharatiya Nyaya Sanhita (BNS) for culpable homicide, attempted culpable homicide, and endangering life. On 30 September, Mathiazhagan was arrested in relation to the case. On the same day, TVK’s election campaign management general secretary, Aadhav Arjuna, was booked for allegedly posting a message on social media that was intended to incite unrest, referencing Gen Z protests in Sri Lanka and Nepal. Mathiazhagan was granted bail in mid-October.

In January 2026, Vijay was questioned twice by the CBI at their Delhi headquarters on January 12 and January 19, about the incidence, including his delayed arrival to the rally and his decision to leave early after the situation worsened.

He was questioned for the third time in March 2026, again at CBI Headquarters at Delhi.

== Reactions ==
=== Tamilaga Vetri Kazhagam ===
Vijay shared a statement on social media after returning to Chennai (the capital of Tamil Nadu), stating that he was "writhing in unbearable, indescribable pain and sorrow that words cannot express." He extended his condolences to the families of those who lost their lives, and offered prayers for the swift recovery of the injured. He announced that he intended to pay the families of the deceased ₹2 million (US$21,000), and the injured ₹0.2 million (US$2,100). He released a video three days later, in which he insinuated that it is a political conspiracy and urged Chief Minister M. K. Stalin to take action against him personally instead of his party members, if there was a need for revenge.

On 8 October 2025, the TVK submitted a petition to the Tamil Nadu Director General of Police and the Home Secretary of India, seeking permission and security arrangements for Vijay's proposed visit to Karur. The petition reportedly requested measures including strict crowd control from Tiruchirappalli airport to Karur, the creation of a secured traffic corridor, deployment of an armed police escort at the airport, security arrangements in Karur, the establishment of a one-kilometer security perimeter around the venue, regulated entry and exit, and limited access for the press and media.

On 27 October 2025, Vijay met with victim's families in Mamallapuram, a coastal town near Chennai, to express his condolences. The private closed door meeting took place at a resort, and the families were brought from Karur to the venue by bus. Media outlets reported that approximately 30 families attended.

=== Government of Tamil Nadu ===
The state's chief minister, M. K. Stalin, said that the situation was "worrying", dispatching health minister Ma. Subramanian, ex-minister V. Senthil Balaji, and other officials to oversee the relief efforts. Later, he visited the Government Medical College Hospital in Karur, where he met the injured and their families and paid tribute to those who lost their lives. He also announced a compensation of ₹1 million (US$10,000) for the families of the deceased.

The opposition leader in the Tamil Nadu Legislative Assembly and AIADMK general secretary, Edappadi K. Palaniswami, expressed shock at the incident and offered his condolences to the families of the deceased. He directed party functionaries to provide necessary assistance to those admitted at the government hospital, after meeting the victims and the families of the deceased, he claimed that "such a stampede has never occurred before in the state during a political campaign", and urged the police not to show bias in favor of the ruling party when providing security to opposition parties.

=== Indian government ===
Indian president Droupadi Murmu, vice president C. P. Radhakrishnan, and prime minister Narendra Modi expressed their condolences on social media. Modi announced a payment of ₹200,000 (US$2,100) for the families of the deceased and ₹50,000 (US$520) for those injured in the disaster.

On 29 September, the union finance minister Nirmala Sitharaman, accompanied by the minister of state for parliamentary affairs L. Murugan and Tamil Nadu's Bharatiya Janata Party (BJP) president Nainar Nagenthran, visited the families of the victims to express their condolences and discuss assistance measures. On 30 September, a delegation of eight National Democratic Alliance MPs, led by Hema Malini, and which included Anurag Thakur, Tejasvi Surya, Brij Lal, Aparajita Sarangi, Rekha Sharma, Shrikant Shinde and Putta Mahesh Kumar inspected the site and met the victims at the hospital. Hema Malini questioned the administrative approval for such a large gathering at an inadequate venue, calling for accountability from both organisers and officials. Anurag Thakur demanded an impartial judicial probe by a sitting Supreme Court judge and criticised the state government’s handling of the tragedy. The delegation also announced plans to visit the homes of the victims and submit its findings to the BJP central leadership.

=== International ===
Xu Feihong, the ambassador of China to India, said that he was "deeply saddened by the tragic incident in Karur, Tamil Nadu" and offered his "heartfelt condolences to the families who have lost their loved ones", while wishing "strength and healing to all those affected". Later, in response to a question from The Paper, China's foreign ministry spokesperson Guo Jiakun said "We take note of the tragedy and express our deep condolences for the victims. Our heart goes out to their families and those who are injured. In the wake of the incident, China’s embassy in India expressed grief and sympathies. According to what we've learned, no Chinese fatalities or injuries have been reported so far".

== See also ==
- Crowd collapses and crushes – Type of disaster that occurs due to overcrowding
- Human stampede – A large group of people all try to get away from a perceived danger
- List of fatal crowd crushes
- Mahamaham stampede – 1992 crowd crush in Tamil Nadu, India
