= Inigo S. Irudayaraj =

Indian politician

Dr. Inigo S. Irudayaraj

Member of the Tamil Nadu Legislative Assembly
- In office 12 May 2021 – 04 May 2026
- Preceded by: Vellamandi N. Natarajan
- Succeeded by: C. Joseph Vijay
- Constituency: Tiruchirappalli (East)

Personal details
- Party: Dravida Munnetra Kazhagam

Inigo S. Irudayaraj is an Indian politician who was the Member of Legislative Assembly of Tamil Nadu. He was elected from Tiruchirappalli (East) as a Dravida Munnetra Kazhagam candidate in 2021.On 2026 election he lost the seat to actor turned politician and Chief Minister candidate Vijay.

== Elections contested ==
Election	Constituency	Party	Result	Vote	Vote %	Opponent	Opponent Party	Vote	Vote %	Margin	Ref.
2026 Tamil Nadu Legislative Assembly election	Tiruchirappalli (East)	DMK	Lost	63,965	35.05%	C. Joseph Vijay	Tamilaga Vetri Kazhagam	91,381	50.07%	27,416	
2021 Tamil Nadu Legislative Assembly election	Tiruchirappalli (East)	DMK	Won	94,302	55.04%	Vellamandi N. Natarajan	ADMK	40,505	23.64%	53,797	
