= Tiruchirappalli East Assembly constituency =

One of the 234 State Legislative Assembly Constituencies in Tamil Nadu

Coordinates: 10.81°N 78.70°E

Tiruchirappalli (East)
- Constituency No. 141 for the Tamil Nadu Legislative Assembly
- Interactive map outlining Trichy East assembly constituency

Constituency details
- Country: India
- Region: South India
- State: Tamil Nadu
- District: Tiruchirappalli
- Lok Sabha constituency: Tiruchirappalli
- Established: 2008
- Total electors: 220,191
- Reservation: None

Member of Legislative Assembly
- 17th Tamil Nadu Legislative Assembly
- Incumbent Vacant

Tiruchirappalli (East) is a constituency of Tamil Nadu Legislative Assembly located in Tiruchirappalli district of Tamil Nadu. Its State Assembly Constituency number is 141. It was called Tiruchirappalli – II before the constituency delimitations in 2008. It comes under Tiruchirappalli Lok Sabha constituency for Parliament elections. It includes Ward Nos. 8- 26, 33- 35, 37 and 38 of Tiruchirappalli City Municipal Corporation. It is one of the 234 State Legislative Assembly Constituencies in Tamil Nadu.

== Members of Legislative Assembly ==
Year	Winner	Party
2011	R. Manoharan	All India Anna Dravida Munnetra Kazhagam
2016	Vellamandi N. Natarajan	All India Anna Dravida Munnetra Kazhagam
2021	Inigo S. Irudayaraj	Dravida Munnetra Kazhagam
2026	C. Joseph Vijay	Tamilaga Vettri Kazhagam
2026^		

== Election results ==
=== 2026 By-election ===
2026 Tamil Nadu Legislative Assembly Bye-election: Tiruchirappalli East
Party	Candidate	Votes	%	±%
TVK				
DMK				
AIADMK				
NTK				
Other parties	Other party candidates			
Independent	Independent candidates			
NOTA	None of the above			
Margin of victory				
Turnout				
Registered electors				
gain from		Swing		

=== 2026 ===
2026 Tamil Nadu Legislative Assembly election: Tiruchirappalli East
Party	Candidate	Votes	%	±%
TVK	C. Joseph Vijay	91,391	50.07	New
DMK	Inigo S. Irudayaraj	63,965	35.05	▼19.51
AIADMK	G. Rajashekaran	19,715	10.80	▼12.63
NTK	Dr Krishnaswamy V	4,790	2.64	▼5.64
NOTA	None of the above	514	0.1	▼1.4
Margin of victory		27,416	15.02	▼15.11
Turnout		1,82,493		
Rejected ballots				
Registered electors		2,17,397		
TVK gain from DMK		Swing	▲50.07	

=== 2021 ===
2021 Tamil Nadu Legislative Assembly election: Tiruchirappalli East
Party	Candidate	Votes	%	±%
DMK	Inigo S. Irudayaraj	94,302	54.56	
AIADMK	Vellamandi N. Natarajan	40,505	23.43	
NTK	Prabhu	14,312	8.28	
MNM	D.Veerasakthi	11,396	6.59	
AMMK	R. Manoharan	9,089	5.26	
Margin of victory		53,797	31.13	
Turnout				
DMK gain from AIADMK		Swing		

=== 2016 ===
2016 Tamil Nadu Legislative Assembly election: Tiruchirappalli East
Party	Candidate	Votes	%	±%
AIADMK	Vellamandi N. Natarajan	79,938	47.87	−6.97
INC	Jerome Arockiaraj	58,044	34.76	+34.76
MDMK	Rohaiyaah Shaik Mohamed	9,694	5.81	+5.81
BJP	Rajaiyan	7,210	4.32	+2.29
NOTA	None of the above	4,329	2.59	+2.59
Margin of victory		21,894	13.11	−0.51
Turnout		1,67,072	68.90	−6.48
AIADMK hold		Swing		

=== 2011 ===
2011 Tamil Nadu Legislative Assembly election: Tiruchirappalli East
Party	Candidate	Votes	%	±%
AIADMK	R. Manoharan	83,046	54.84	+54.84
DMK	Anbil Periyasamy	62,420	41.22	+41.22
BJP	P. Parthiban	3,170	2.09	+2.09
IND	S. Manoj Kumar	631	0.42	+0.42
RJD	N. M. Elango	539	0.36	+0.36
Margin of victory		20,626	13.62	−−−−
Turnout		1,51,466	75.38	New
AIADMK hold		Swing		
