= M. Jayakumar (DMK politician) =

Indian politician

M. Jayakumar is an Indian politician and member of Dravida Munnetra Kazhagam (DMK). He is the elected Member of the Legislative Assembly (MLA) for the Udumalaipettai Assembly constituency in Tiruppur and Coimbatore districts in Tamil Nadu, having won the seat in the 2026 Tamil Nadu Legislative Assembly election.
