= N. Thirupathi =

Indian politician (born 1963)

Narayansamy Thirupathi (born 1963) is an Indian politician from Tamil Nadu. He is a member of the Tamil Nadu Legislative Assembly from the Tiruppattur Assembly constituency in Tirupathur district of the erstwhile Vellore district, representing the Tamilaga Vettri Kazhagam.

Thirupathi is from Tirupathur, Tamil Nadu. He is the son of Narayansamy. He studied at Government Boys Higher Secondary School, Madavalam, and passed Class 10 in 1982 and Class 12 in 1984. Later, he did his graduation in veterinary science at Madras Veterinary College, Vepery from 1984 to 1989. He declared assets worth Rs.15 crore in his affidavit to the Election Commission of India.

Thirupathi won the 2026 Tamil Nadu Legislative Assembly election from the Tiruppattur Assembly constituency representing the Tamilaga Vettri Kazhagam. He polled 1,05,098 votes and defeated his nearest rival and sitting MLA, A. Nallathambi of the Dravida Munnetra Kazhagam, by a margin of 48,263 votes.
