= G. Viswanathan =

17th Speaker of the Lok Sabha (born 1962)

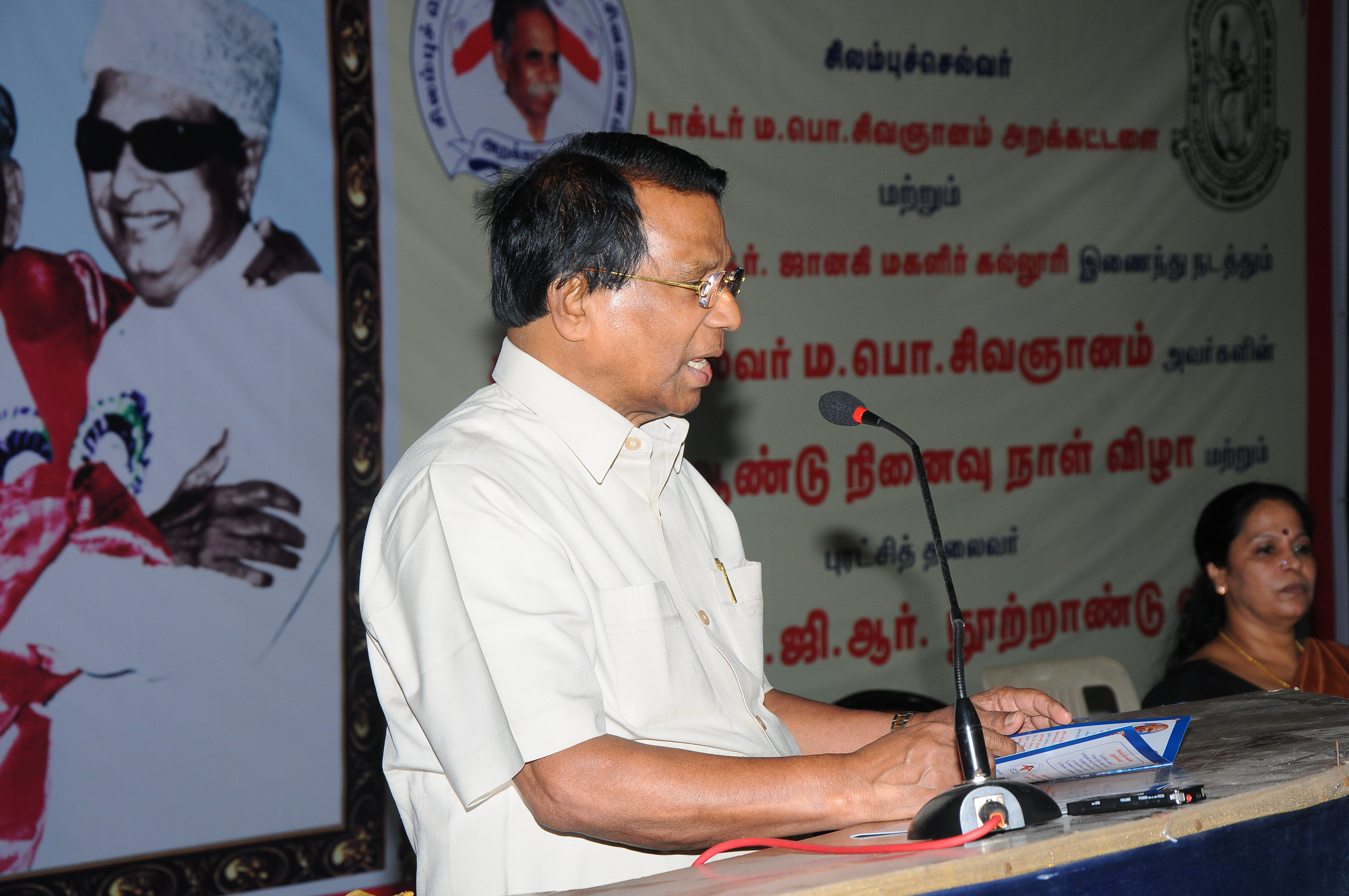

Chancellor, Vellore Institute of Technology
- Incumbent
- Assumed office 1984
- Preceded by: Position established

Minister for Food & Co-operation, Government of Tamil Nadu
- In office 1 November 1991 – 17 May 1993
- Chief Minister: J. Jayalalithaa
- Governor: Bhishma Narain Singh
- Cabinet: First Jayalalithaa ministry
- Preceded by: K. Rajaram
- Succeeded by: R. M. Veerappan (Minister for Food); C. P. Pattabiraman (Minister for Co-operation)

Member of Tamil Nadu Legislative Assembly
- In office 1991–1995 (Note: disqualified)
- Preceded by: T. R. Gajapathy
- Succeeded by: P. N. Subramani
- Constituency: Arcot
- In office 1980–1984
- Preceded by: R. Margabandhu
- Succeeded by: V. R. Krishnasamy
- Constituency: Anaicut

Member of Parliament, Lok Sabha
- In office 1967–1977
- Preceded by: A. Jayarama Mudaliar
- Succeeded by: Venugopal Gounder
- Constituency: Wandiwash

Personal details
- Born: 8 December 1938 (age 87) Kottakuppam, North Arcot, Madras Presidency, British India
- Party: Dravida Munnetra Kazhagam (till 1975); All India Anna Dravida Munnetra Kazhagam (1975-1995); Marumalarchi Dravida Munnetra Kazhagam (1995)
- Spouse: Pushpa
- Children: 4
- Education: Voorhees College, Vellore; Loyola College, Chennai; Dr. Ambedkar Government Law College, Chennai (Madras University)
- Occupation: Founder and chancellor, VIT University
- Website: https://bschool.vit.ac.in/dr-g-viswanathan/

Govindasamy Viswanathan (born 8 December 1938) is an Indian politician and the founder and chancellor of Vellore Institute of Technology in India.

== Early life and education ==
Viswanathan was born in a Mudaliar family near Gudiyattam. He obtained a master's degree in economics from Loyola College and completed law from Madras University. His leadership skills were noticed by C. N. Annadurai and the DMK party chose him to contest the elections in 1967.

== Political career ==
He served as a member of parliament from the Wandiwash Lok Sabha constituency for two terms after getting elected as a Dravida Munnetra Kazhagam candidate in 1967 and 1971. He was elected twice to the Tamil Nadu legislative assembly as an Anna Dravida Munnetra Kazhagam candidate from Anaicut constituency in the 1980 election and from Arcot constituency in 1991 election.

== Career ==
Currently, Dr. G Viswanathan holds these offices:

- Chancellor, VIT University, Vellore
- Chancellor, VIT University, Chennai
- Chancellor, VIT-AP University, Amaravati
- Chancellor, VIT Bhopal University, Bhopal
- Chairman and Managing Trustee, North Arcot Educational and Charitable Trust, Vellore
- President, Friends of United States
- Executive President, The Centenarian Trust, Chennai
- Vice President, Thiru Vi Ka – Dr. Mu. Va. Educational Trust, Chennai
- President, Universal Higher Education Trust, Vellore (NGO)
- President, Indian Economic Association (IEA)
- President, Education Promotion Society of India (EPSI) [https://epsiindia.org/]
- President, North Arcot District Tuluva Vellala Association.

== Electoral performance ==
Election	Constituency	Political party	Result	Vote %	Opposition			Ref
Election	Constituency	Political party	Result	Vote %	Candidate	Political party	Vote %	Ref
1980	Anaikattu	AIADMK	Won	53.37%	R. Jeevarathinam	INC	44.35%	
1989	Anaikattu	AIADMK	Lost	31.73%	S. P. Kannan	DMK	35.64%	
1991	Arcot	AIADMK	Won	61.16%	T. R. Gajapathy	DMK	27.20%	
