= Ammapalayam =

Ammapalayam may refer to one of several villages in Tamil Nadu state in India:

- Ammapalayam, Dharmapuri, in Dharmapuri district
- Ammapalayam, Erode, in Erode district
- Ammapalayam, Salem, in Salem district
