= R. Srinivasan =

Indian politician

R. Srinivasan is an Indian politician and was a member of the 14th Tamil Nadu Legislative Assembly from the Arcot constituency. He represented the All India Anna Dravida Munnetra Kazhagam party.

The elections of 2016 resulted in his constituency being won by J. L. Eswarappan.

Business

He is the Proprietor of V. K. R. Millk Dairy situated at No. 2F/1, Gollapalayam, Arcot, Vellore - 632503, Tamil Nadu. which is the manufacturer and supplier of Dairy products, milk, ghee, flavoured milk.

== Electoral performance ==
Election	Constituency	Political party	Result	Vote %	Opposition			Ref
Election	Constituency	Political party	Result	Vote %	Candidate	Political party	Vote %	Ref
2011	Arcot	AIADMK	Won	53.11%	K. L. Elavazagan	PMK	42.14%	
