= D. Velazhagan =

Indian politician

Member of the Tamil Nadu Legislative Assembly
- Incumbent
- Assumed office 11 May 2026
- Preceded by: A. P. Nandakumar
- Constituency: Anaikattu

Personal details
- Party: All India Anna Dravida Munnetra Kazhagam
- Parent: K. Dharmalingam (father)
- Occupation: Politician, 50% Partner in AVS Blue Metal & Srinivasa Blue Metals

Dharmalingam Velazhagan is an Indian politician from Tamil Nadu. He is a Member of the 17th Legislative Assembly of Tamil Nadu. He was elected from Anaicut Assembly constituency as an AIADMK candidate.

He won the 2026 Tamil Nadu Legislative Assembly election from Anaicut constituency representing the All India Anna Dravida Munnetra Kazhagam. He polled 76,302 votes and defeated his nearest rival, A. P. Nandakumar of the Dravida Munnetra Kazhagam, by a margin of 7.081 votes.

== Elections contested ==
2026 Tamil Nadu Legislative Assembly election : Anaikattu
Party	Candidate	Votes	%	±%
AIADMK	D. Velazhagan	76,302	35.27%	New
DMK	A. P. Nandakumar	69,221	32.00%	▼16.55
TVK	R. Velmurugan	63,287	29.26%	New
NTK	M. Ravikumar	4,746	2.19%	▼1.96
NOTA	None of the above	1,103	0.51%	▼0.40
Margin of victory		7,081	3.27%	▲0.03
Turnout		217,085	90.21%	▲12.66
Total valid votes		216,318		
Registered electors		240,640		▼6.27
AIADMK gain from DMK		Swing	▼13.28	
