= Gopu =

Gopu may refer to:

- Typist Gopu (”டைப்பிஸ்ட்” கோபு), a Tamil stage and film actor
- Chitralaya Gopu (சித்ராலயா கோபு), an Indian screenwriter and director who works in the Tamil cinema
- C. Gopu, an Indian politician and former Member of the Legislative Assembly of Tamil Nadu
- Archbishop Joseph Mark Gopu (September 19, 1953 – February 28, 1971) Roman Catholic Archdiocese of Hyderabad
- A nickname of S. Sreesanth, Indian cricketer
