= Anaicut Assembly constituency =

State Legislative Assembly Constituency in Tamil Nadu

Coordinates: 12.876311°N 78.988148°E

Anaicut
- Constituency No. 44 for the Tamil Nadu Legislative Assembly

Constituency details
- Country: India
- Region: South India
- State: Tamil Nadu
- District: Vellore
- Lok Sabha constituency: Vellore
- Established: 1977
- Total electors: 2,40,640
- Reservation: None

Member of Legislative Assembly
- 17th Tamil Nadu Legislative Assembly
- Incumbent D. Velazhagan
- Party: AIADMK
- Alliance: NDA
- Elected year: 2026

Anaicut is one of the 234 constituencies in the legislative assembly of the Indian state of Tamil Nadu. It includes the towns of Pallikonda and Odugathur, and the village Anaicut. It is part of Vellore Lok Sabha constituency for national elections to the Parliament of India.

== Members of the Legislative Assembly ==
Election	Member	Party
1977	R. Margabandhu	All India Anna Dravida Munnetra Kazhagam
1980	G. Viswanathan	All India Anna Dravida Munnetra Kazhagam
1984	V. R. Krishnasamy	All India Anna Dravida Munnetra Kazhagam
1989	S. P. Kannan	Dravida Munnetra Kazhagam
1991	K. Dharmalingam	All India Anna Dravida Munnetra Kazhagam
1996	C. Gopu	Dravida Munnetra Kazhagam
2001	K. Pandurangan	All India Anna Dravida Munnetra Kazhagam
2006	K. Pandurangan	All India Anna Dravida Munnetra Kazhagam
2011	M. Kalai Arasu	Pattali Makkal Katchi
2016	A. P. Nandakumar	Dravida Munnetra Kazhagam
2021	A. P. Nandakumar	Dravida Munnetra Kazhagam
2026	D. Velazhagan	All India Anna Dravida Munnetra Kazhagam

== Election results ==
Vote share of winning candidates
2026	35.27%
2021	48.55%
2016	42.43%
2011	54.51%
2006	45.02%
2001	56.24%
1996	55.79%
1991	57.59%
1989	35.64%
1984	58.42%
1980	53.37%
1977	48.78%

=== 2026 ===
2026 Tamil Nadu Legislative Assembly election : Anaikattu
Party	Candidate	Votes	%	±%
AIADMK	D. Velazhagan	76,302	35.27%	New
DMK	A. P. Nandakumar	69,221	32.00%	▼16.55
TVK	R. Velmurugan	63,287	29.26%	New
NTK	M. Ravikumar	4,746	2.19%	▼1.96
NOTA	None of the above	1,103	0.51%	▼0.40
Margin of victory		7,081	3.27%	▲0.03
Turnout		217,085	90.21%	▲12.66
Total valid votes		216,318		
Registered electors		240,640		▼6.27
AIADMK gain from DMK		Swing	▼13.28	

=== 2021 ===
2021 Tamil Nadu Legislative Assembly election : Anaikattu
Party	Candidate	Votes	%	±%
DMK	A. P. Nandakumar	95,159	48.55%	▲6.12
AIADMK	D. Velazhagan	88,799	45.30%	▲7.70
NTK	A. Sumithra	8,125	4.15%	▲3.75
NOTA	None of the above	1,791	0.91%	▲0.23
Independent	M. Senthil Kumar	1,357	0.69%	
Margin of victory		6,360	3.24%	▼1.59
Turnout		199,099	77.55%	▼0.84
Total valid votes		196,014		
Rejected ballots		588	0.30%	▲0.20
Registered electors		256,727		▲10.69
DMK hold		Swing		

=== 2016 ===
2016 Tamil Nadu Legislative Assembly election : Anaikattu
Party	Candidate	Votes	%	±%
DMK	A. P. Nandakumar	77,058	42.43%	New
AIADMK	M. Kalai Arasu	68,290	37.60%	New
PMK	K. L. Elavazagan	24,711	13.61%	▼40.90
TMC(M)	P. S. Palani	2,633	1.45%	New
BJP	K. Vijayakumar	1,750	0.96%	New
NOTA	None of the above	1,237	0.68%	New
Margin of victory		8,768	4.83%	▼14.13
Turnout		181,803	78.39%	▲0.26
Total valid votes		181,622		
Rejected ballots		181	0.10%	▲0.01
Registered electors		231,928		▲23.00
DMK gain from PMK		Swing	▼12.08	

=== 2011 ===
2011 Tamil Nadu Legislative Assembly election : Anaikattu
Party	Candidate	Votes	%	±%
PMK	M. Kalai Arasu	80,233	54.51%	▲9.54
DMDK	V. B. Velu	52,330	35.55%	▲29.87
Makkal Manadu Katch	M. Dharman	4,696	3.19%	New
Independent	K. Velu	2,619	1.78%	
Independent	Dr. R. Shanmugam	1,962	1.33%	
IJK	Albert Anbarasu	1,369	0.93%	New
BSP	S. Renu	1,018	0.69%	▲0.13
Margin of victory		27,903	18.96%	▲18.92
Turnout		147,326	78.13%	▲8.93
Total valid votes		147,194		
Rejected ballots		132	0.09%	▲0.09
Registered electors		188,555		▼0.88
PMK gain from AIADMK		Swing	▲9.49	

=== 2006 ===
2006 Tamil Nadu Legislative Assembly election : Anaikattu
Party	Candidate	Votes	%	±%
AIADMK	K. Pandurangan	59,220	45.02%	New
PMK	M. Varalakshmi	59,167	44.97%	New
DMDK	M. Venkatasan	7,470	5.68%	New
Independent	G. Veeramani	1,335	1.01%	
BJP	J. Kumaresan	1,287	0.98%	New
Independent	S. Panneerselvam	795	0.60%	
Margin of victory		53	0.04%	▼19.26
Turnout		131,641	69.20%	▲8.40
Total valid votes		131,556		
Registered electors		190,228		▲5.96
AIADMK gain from AIADMK		Swing	▼11.22	

=== 2001 ===
2001 Tamil Nadu Legislative Assembly election : Anaikattu
Party	Candidate	Votes	%	±%
AIADMK	K. Pandurangan	61,333	56.24%	▲30.35
DMK	G. Malarvizhi	40,282	36.93%	▼18.86
MDMK	K. P. Baskar Babu	2,829	2.59%	▲0.53
Independent	G. Vijayan	2,160	1.98%	
Independent	S. Ebinesar Albert Benjamin	878	0.81%	
Margin of victory		21,051	19.30%	▼10.61
Turnout		109,150	60.80%	▼3.37
Total valid votes		109,064		
Rejected ballots		86	0.08%	▼4.80
Registered electors		179,523		▲3.91
AIADMK gain from DMK		Swing	▲0.45	

=== 1996 ===
1996 Tamil Nadu Legislative Assembly election : Anaikattu
Party	Candidate	Votes	%	±%
DMK	C. Gopu	58,982	55.79%	▲35.81
AIADMK	C. M. Suryakala	27,366	25.89%	New
AIIC(T)	Balur E. Sampath	15,976	15.11%	New
MDMK	N. M. Murugesan	2,174	2.06%	New
Independent	D. V. Raghavan	734	0.69%	
Margin of victory		31,616	29.91%	▼7.70
Turnout		110,863	64.17%	▲1.94
Total valid votes		105,716		
Rejected ballots		5,410	4.88%	▼0.93
Registered electors		172,760		▲7.18
DMK gain from AIADMK		Swing	▼1.80	

=== 1991 ===
1991 Tamil Nadu Legislative Assembly election : Anaikattu
Party	Candidate	Votes	%	±%
AIADMK	K. Dharmalingam	54,413	57.59%	New
DMK	S. P. Kannan	18,880	19.98%	▼15.66
PMK	R. Mohan	17,163	18.16%	New
Independent	A. Palanivelan	1,872	1.98%	
Independent	Govinda Rao	594	0.63%	
Margin of victory		35,533	37.61%	▲33.70
Turnout		100,310	62.23%	▲9.69
Total valid votes		94,484		
Rejected ballots		5,826	5.81%	▲3.39
Registered electors		161,182		▲14.56
AIADMK gain from DMK		Swing	▲21.95	

=== 1989 ===
1989 Tamil Nadu Legislative Assembly election : Anaikattu
Party	Candidate	Votes	%	±%
DMK	S. P. Kannan	25,709	35.64%	New
AIADMK	G. Viswanathan	22,886	31.73%	New
INC	L. Balaraman	12,190	16.90%	New
AIADMK	V. R. Krishnasamy	6,394	8.86%	New
Independent	D. Thoppur Thiruvencadam	3,362	4.66%	
Independent	S. V. A. Purushothaman	866	1.20%	
Margin of victory		2,823	3.91%	▼20.10
Turnout		73,925	52.54%	▼16.64
Total valid votes		72,136		
Rejected ballots		1,789	2.42%	▼3.34
Registered electors		140,696		▲18.28
DMK gain from AIADMK		Swing	▼22.78	

=== 1984 ===
1984 Tamil Nadu Legislative Assembly election : Anaikattu
Party	Candidate	Votes	%	±%
AIADMK	V. R. Krishnasamy	45,312	58.42%	▲5.05
Independent	P. N. Rajagopal	26,692	34.42%	
Independent	P. Munivelu	2,175	2.80%	
Independent	M. Duraisamy	1,874	2.42%	
Independent	M. Balasundaram	934	1.20%	
Independent	V. Vajikoman	569	0.73%	
Margin of victory		18,620	24.01%	▲14.99
Turnout		82,294	69.18%	▲9.51
Total valid votes		77,556		
Rejected ballots		4,738	5.76%	▲3.75
Registered electors		118,953		▲5.34
AIADMK hold		Swing		

=== 1980 ===
1980 Tamil Nadu Legislative Assembly election : Anaikattu
Party	Candidate	Votes	%	±%
AIADMK	G. Viswanathan	35,242	53.37%	New
INC	R. Jeevarathinam	29,287	44.35%	▲37.75
Independent	K. B. Vajjravel	1,505	2.28%	
Margin of victory		5,955	9.02%	▼18.68
Turnout		67,386	59.67%	▼1.97
Total valid votes		66,034		
Rejected ballots		1,352	2.01%	▲0.30
Registered electors		112,926		▲1.96
AIADMK gain from AIADMK		Swing	▲4.59	

=== 1977 ===
1977 Tamil Nadu Legislative Assembly election : Anaikattu
Party	Candidate	Votes	%	±%
AIADMK	R. Margabandhu	32,731	48.78%	New
JP	P. M. Vasudeva Reddiar	14,146	21.08%	New
DMK	A. M. Ramalingam	13,985	20.84%	New
INC	T. K. Venkatesan	4,427	6.60%	New
Independent	M. Moorthy	1,091	1.63%	New
Margin of victory		18,585	27.70%	
Turnout		68,272	61.64%	
Total valid votes		67,104		
Rejected ballots		1,168	1.71%	
Registered electors		110,756		
AIADMK win (new seat)				
