= T. R. Gajapathy =

Indian politician

Member-Tamil Nadu Legislative Assembly
- In office 1989–1991
- Preceded by: T. Palani
- Succeeded by: G. Viswanathan
- Constituency: Arcot Assembly constituency

Personal details
- Party: Dravida Munnetra Kazhagam
- Occupation: Politician

T. R. Gajapathy (Thiruvaithiyur Ramanuja Gajapathy) is an Indian politician and a former Member of the Tamil Nadu Legislative Assembly (MLA) for the Arcot Assembly constituency. Gajapathy belongs to Dravida Munnetra Kazhagam (DMK) party. As a DMK candidate, he contested and won the Arcot Assembly constituency in the 1989 Tamil Nadu Legislative Assembly election.

== Electoral Performance ==
=== 1989 ===
1989 Tamil Nadu Legislative Assembly election: Arcot
Party	Candidate	Votes	%	±%
DMK	T. R. Gajapathy	34,775	36.50%	−2.46
AIADMK	K. V. Ramdoss	20,470	21.49%	−37.47
AIADMK	T. Palani	14,581	15.31%	−43.66
INC	A. K. T. Kannan	12,053	12.65%	New
Independent	G. Murthy	11,476	12.05%	New
Margin of victory		14,305	15.02%	−4.98%
Turnout		95,262	75.09%	−4.82%
Registered electors		129,768		
DMK gain from AIADMK		Swing	-22.46%	
