= A. P. Nandakumar =

Indian politician

Member of the Tamil Nadu Legislative Assembly
- In office 19 May 2016 – 6 May 2026
- Preceded by: M. Kalai Arasu
- Succeeded by: D. Velazhagan
- Constituency: Anaikattu

Personal details
- Party: Dravida Munnetra Kazhagam

A. P. Nandakumar is an Indian politician and a member of the Dravida Munnetra Kazhagam (DMK) party. He currently serves as the Member of Legislative Assembly of Tamil Nadu representing the Anaikattu. He was first elected to the Tamil Nadu Legislative Assembly in 2016, defeating the incumbent AIADMK candidate, and was re-elected in 2021 for a second consecutive term. Over the years, he has become known for his grassroots activism, consistent advocacy for inclusive governance, and his instrumental role in implementing large-scale development projects in Anaikattu. He has also served in key party leadership roles, including as the Vellore Central District Secretary of the DMK.

== Electoral performance ==
=== Entry into Politics and DMK Involvement ===
A. P. Nandakumar began his political journey with the DMK in the early 2000s. Demonstrating dedication and organizational skills, he rose through the ranks to become the Vellore Central District Secretary. In this role, he launched a large-scale membership drive aimed at enrolling 50,000 new party members in the Vellore district, thereby strengthening the DMK’s grassroots base.

| Election | Constituency | Political party | Result | Vote % | Opposition | | | Ref |
| Election | Constituency | Political party | Result | Vote % | Candidate | Political party | Vote % | Ref |
|---|---|---|---|---|---|---|---|---|
| 2016 | Anaikattu | DMK | Won | 42.43% | M. Kalai Arasu | AIADMK | 37.60% | |
| 2021 | Anaikattu | DMK | Won | 48.55% | D. Velazhagan | AIADMK | 45.30% | - |
| 2026 | Anaikattu | DMK | Lost | 32.00% | D. Velazhagan | AIADMK | 35.27% | - |

=== Legislative Contributions ===
As a legislator, Nandakumar has actively contributed to assembly debates, particularly on issues affecting his constituency. He raised concerns over:

- Discrepancies in property tax assessments between neighboring properties.
- Delays in implementing development schemes worth ₹235 crore under the Smart City and AMRUT programs.
- The importance of inviting opposition MLAs to official functions for inclusive governance.

== Development Initiatives in Anaikattu (2021–2025) ==
During his second term, A. P. Nandakumar prioritized robust and inclusive development across the Anaikattu constituency, addressing critical sectors like healthcare, infrastructure, agriculture, education, and housing. His tenure has been marked by multi-crore investments aimed at improving the quality of life for residents and modernizing public infrastructure.

=== Health and Administrative Infrastructure ===
To meet the region's growing healthcare demands, Nandakumar facilitated the establishment of a new government hospital in Anaikattu with an investment of ₹80 crore. A new Taluk Office complex was sanctioned at a cost of ₹30 crore, aiming to improve administrative efficiency. The public health system also saw the addition of new Primary Health Centres (PHCs) worth ₹22 crore and a modernization initiative for urban health centres funded with ₹3.4 crore. A new bus stand in Odugathur was developed with ₹1.65 crore, enhancing public transport facilities.

=== Irrigation and Agriculture ===
Agricultural sustainability received a significant boost under his leadership. ₹36.29 crore was allocated for the renovation of the Anaikattu Periya Eri (major tank), a key water resource. The Perumpallam Canal was desilted and revitalized with ₹29.25 crore to support irrigation. Flood mitigation efforts were rolled out at a cost of ₹20 crore, alongside ₹15 crore for check dams and water conservation systems, thereby enhancing agricultural resilience.

=== Roads and Connectivity ===
Improving rural connectivity was another major focus. Over ₹25 crore was invested in upgrading rural roads through NABARD and RIDF schemes. Six major inter-village roads were revamped with ₹13.35 crore, while ₹8.5 crore was used for building stormwater drains and culverts to enhance drainage and reduce waterlogging.

=== Education and Youth ===
Recognizing the importance of youth development and education, Nandakumar led efforts to renovate and modernize government schools. A dedicated budget of ₹1.83 crore funded the construction of nine new classrooms and sanitation facilities. Investments were also made in building sports grounds, youth centres, and community halls to encourage extra-curricular engagement and leadership among young residents.

=== Housing and Sanitation ===
Under the Pradhan Mantri Awas Yojana (PMAY), 1,600 new houses were constructed, addressing the need for affordable housing. Additionally, Anaikattu achieved 100% household toilet coverage, marking a significant milestone in rural sanitation and public health.

=== Additional Projects ===
In the realm of animal healthcare, ₹5 crore was spent to establish a new veterinary hospital. Anganwadi centres were upgraded and equipped with learning kits to enhance early childhood education. Plans were also initiated for setting up MSME training institutes and a TIDEL Park in the region to foster employment and industrial growth.

== Future Proposals (2025–2026 Planning Year) ==
Looking ahead, Nandakumar has proposed several ambitious projects for the constituency:

- A ₹100 crore Mega Market Complex in Odugathur to strengthen local trade infrastructure.
- A new ₹5 crore Taluk Office in Peranambattu to decentralize administrative services.
- Expansion of the Vellore Smart City initiative into Anaikattu with a ₹8.5 crore investment.

== Public Image and Legacy ==
Nandakumar is regarded for his transparent, inclusive governance style. His push for developmental planning with cross-party collaboration has earned him respect both within the DMK and among the constituents of Anaikattu.
