= S. M. Sukumar =

Indian politician

Member of the Tamil Nadu Legislative Assembly
- Incumbent
- Assumed office 11 May 2026
- Preceded by: J. L. Eswarappan
- Constituency: Arcot

Personal details
- Party: All India Anna Dravida Munnetra Kazhagam
- Parent: Muruganandham (father)
- Occupation: Politician, Business, Rental Income

S. Muruganandham Sukumar is an Indian politician who is a Member of the 17th Legislative Assembly of Tamil Nadu. He was elected from Arcot as an AIADMK candidate in 2026.

== Electoral performance ==
Election	Constituency	Political party	Result	Vote %	Opposition			Ref
Election	Constituency	Political party	Result	Vote %	Candidate	Political party	Vote %	Ref
2026	Arcot	AIADMK	Won	46.77%	G. Vijay Mohan	TVK	27.85%	-
