= Ammapalayam, Erode =

Panchayat village in India

Ammapalayam
- Panchayat village
- Location in Tamil Nadu, India Ammapalayam (India)
- Coordinates: 11°31′14″N 77°31′44″E
- Country: India
- State: Tamil Nadu
- Region: Coimbatore (Kongu Nadu)
- District: Erode
- Taluk: Gobichettipalayam

Languages
  - Official: Tamil
- Time zone: UTC+5:30 (IST)
- PIN: 638503
- Telephone code: 91(04285)
- Vehicle registration: TN 36

Ammapalayam is a panchayat village in Gobichettipalayam taluk in Erode District of Tamil Nadu state, India. It is about 15 km from Gobichettipalayam and 37 km from district headquarters Erode. The village is located on the road connecting Gobichettipalayam with Bhavani via Mevani. Ammapalayam has a population of about 1102.
