= Mevani =

Village in India

Coordinates: 11°30′N 77°32′E

- village
- Interactive map of Mevani
- Country: India
- State: Tamil Nadu
- District: Erode

Government
  - Body: Gobichetipalayam

Population
  - Total: 10,000

Languages
  - Official: Tamil
- Time zone: UTC+5:30 (IST)
- Nearest city: Gobichetipalayam
- Lok Sabha constituency: Tirupur
- Vidhan Sabha constituency: Gobichetipalayam
- Civic agency: Gobichetipalayam
- Climate: 40 Degree C (Köppen)

Mevani is a village lying on the bank of the Bhavani River, near Gobichettipalayam (15 km), Erode District, Tamil Nadu, India.

Agriculture is the main occupation here. Various films were shot in and around this village. Pariyur kondathu Kaliamman Temple is near to this place. A bridge connects Mevani with Keelvani, a village which lies on other side of the river.

Paddy and Sugar Cane are cultivated the most and the "Bhavani River" serves as the main water resource.
