= T. Palani =

Indian politician

Member-Tamil Nadu Legislative Assembly
- In office 1985–1989
- Preceded by: A. M. Sethuraman
- Succeeded by: T. R. Gajapathy
- Constituency: Arcot Assembly constituency

Personal details
- Born: 14 June 1953 (age 73) Ladavaram
- Party: All India Anna Dravida Munnetra Kazhagam
- Occupation: Politician

T. Palani is an Indian politician and a former Member of the Tamil Nadu Legislative Assembly (MLA) for the Arcot Assembly constituency. He contested and won the Arcot Assembly constituency in the 1984 Tamil Nadu Legislative Assembly election on behalf of the All India Anna Dravida Munnetra Kazhagam (AIADMK) party.

== Electoral performance ==
Election	Constituency	Political party	Result	Vote %	Opposition			Ref
Election	Constituency	Political party	Result	Vote %	Candidate	Political party	Vote %	Ref
1984	Arcot	AIADMK	Won	58.96%	Arcot N. Veeraswami	DMK	38.96%	
1989	Arcot	AIADMK	Lost	15.31%	T. R. Gajapathy	DMK	36.50%	
