= VIT Bhopal University =

Private university in Madhya Pradesh, India

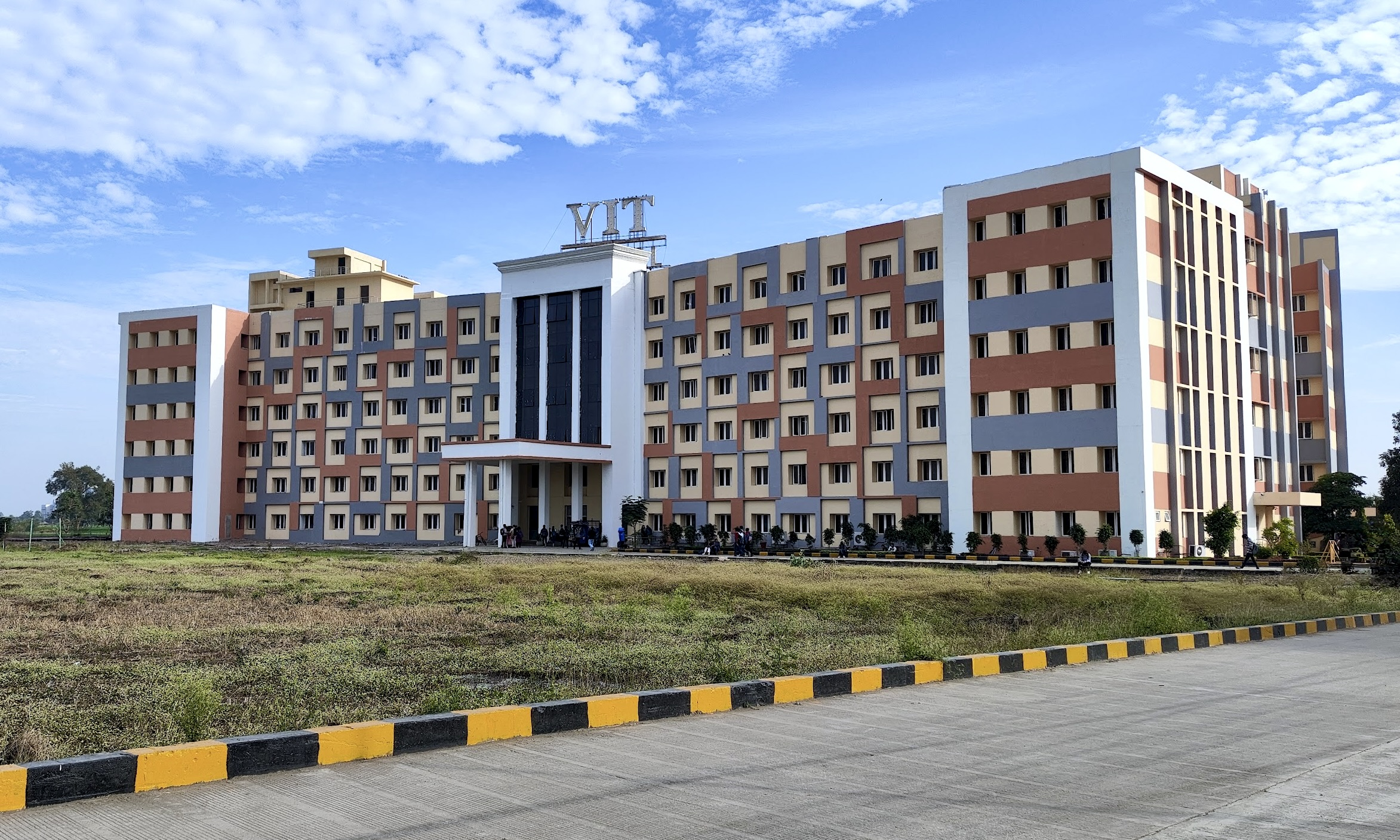
- The main academic building of the university
- Other names: Vellore Institute of Technology, Bhopal
- Motto: "A Place to Learn, Chance to Grow"
- Type: State private
- Established: 2017; 9 years ago
- Founder: G. Viswanathan
- Parent institution: Vellore Institute of Technology
- Chancellor: G. Viswanathan
- Vice-president: Sankar Viswanathan
- Vice-Chancellor: Senthil Kumar Arumugam
- Location: Kothri Kalan, Madhya Pradesh, India; 23°05′N 76°51′E
- Campus: 250 acres (100 ha); Rural
- Colors: Midnight blue and White
- Mascots: A golden lion with wings (symbolic, no official name)
- Website: www.vitbhopal.ac.in

VIT Bhopal University (VIT B), is a state private university in Madhya Pradesh situated in Kothri Kalan in Sehore district, Madhya Pradesh, India. It was established by the Vellore Institute of Technology.

== History ==
Plans to establish VIT Bhopal University were announced in 2016 after approvals were granted by the Government of Madhya Pradesh.The foundation stone for the campus was laid later that year in Sehore district. Academic operations began in 2017, initially with undergraduate engineering programmes. Over time, the university expanded its academic offerings to include programmes in management, sciences, architecture, and doctoral research.

The establishment of the campus marked the entry of the VIT Group into central India. It also represented an effort to extend the group’s academic model to a new geographic region.

== Location and campus ==
VIT Bhopal University, is a state private university of Madhya Pradesh situated in Kothri Kalan in Sehore district, Madhya Pradesh, India.The university campus spans around 250 acres. It includes academic buildings, hostels, laboratories, libraries, sports facilities, and common areas for students and staff. The university operates as a residential campus. Most students live on campus, along with faculty and administrative staff, which supports a self-contained academic environment.

=== Hostel facilities ===
VIT Bhopal University provides on-campus hostel accommodation for students, with separate hostels for male and female residents. Accommodation options include rooms with 2, 3, 4, 6 and 8 beds, available in both air-conditioned and non-air-conditioned configurations.

== Academics ==
VIT Bhopal University offers academic programmes at the undergraduate, postgraduate, integrated, and doctoral levels across engineering, sciences, management, humanities, and allied disciplines. The university follows a semester-based academic structure governed by its academic regulations and curriculum framework.

The institution adopts Collaborative and Active Learning through Technology (CALTech) and a Fully Flexible Credit System (FFCS) to facilitate interdisciplinary learning and student-driven academic planning. Teaching and learning are supported by centralized academic infrastructure including libraries, advanced laboratories, auditoriums, cafeterias, and campus-wide Wi-Fi facilities.

Academic activities are conducted through multiple streams covering Engineering, Bioengineering, Advanced Sciences, Management Studies, and Languages, among others.

== Accreditation and recognition ==
VIT Bhopal University, established in 2017, is a private university located along the Bhopal–Indore Expressway in Madhya Pradesh. The university is recognised by the University Grants Commission (UGC).

VIT Bhopal has been placed 57th out of 160 colleges in India, as reported by independent higher education platforms.

In 2025, the university was awarded the title “University of the Year – Social Impact through Education” at the Academic Insights Education Excellence Awards and Summit. It has also received an AAA institutional rating and secured the 11th position nationally in the SWAYAM–NPTEL Local Chapter rankings, placing it among the top 200 participating institutions across India.

Within discipline-specific assessments, VIT Bhopal has been ranked among the top two institutions in Aerospace Engineering and among the top three in Management studies, reflecting its emphasis on domain-focused academic development.

In 2020, the university received the DSCI Excellence Award for Cyber Security Education, conferred by the Data Security Council of India (DSCI), for the contributions of its Division of Cyber Security and Digital Forensics to national capacity-building in cybersecurity education. The university continues to participate in cybersecurity initiatives, including hackathons and collaborative programmes conducted in association with DSCI and industry partners under the NASSCOM ecosystem.

== Student Life ==
=== Campus Life ===
VIT Bhopal University offers a range of co-curricular and extracurricular activities aimed at supporting student engagement beyond academics. Campus life includes academic, technical, cultural, and national events conducted throughout the academic year. These activities are designed to encourage student participation, peer learning, and skill development in areas such as leadership, teamwork, and innovation.

The university regularly hosts workshops, seminars, technical symposia, cultural programmes, exhibitions, and inter-college competitions. Student activities are coordinated through the university’s Student Welfare system, which oversees various student-led clubs, professional chapters, and technology communities.

=== Clubs, Chapters, and Student Communities ===
Student engagement at VIT Bhopal University is supported through a structured network of clubs and student organizations that operate across technical, professional, cultural, and recreational domains.

The university has multiple technical clubs focused on areas such as artificial intelligence, blockchain, robotics, bioengineering, coding, entrepreneurship, and electric vehicles. These clubs organise activities including coding competitions, hackathons, workshops, industry-oriented seminars, and technical challenges, providing students with opportunities for practical exposure and collaborative learning.

In addition, the university hosts several student chapters affiliated with national and international professional bodies, including IEEE, ACM, GeeksforGeeks, and Toastmasters International. These chapters conduct u4dfdomain-specific webinars, certification-oriented sessions, technical talks, and skill development programmes aligned with professional standards.

VIT Bhopal also supports technology-focused student communities, including those associated with industry platforms such as cloud computing and networking technologies. These communities facilitate peer learning, hands-on training, and interaction with industry practices.

Alongside technical organizations, the university has non-technical and cultural clubs dedicated to music, dance, fine arts, photography, theatre, trekking, and creative pursuits. These clubs regularly conduct cultural showcases, exhibitions, performances, and community-oriented events, contributing to campus social life.

The campus also hosts regional and cultural associations representing diverse linguistic and cultural groups. These associations organise regional festivals, cultural celebrations, and inter-club events, reflecting the multicultural composition of the student body.

=== Festivals and Major Events ===
A key feature of student life at VIT Bhopal University is AdVITya, the university’s annual sports-cum-techno-cultural festival. The multi-day event typically takes place during the academic year and involves participation from a large number of student clubs and chapters.

AdVITya includes a combination of technical competitions, hackathons, workshops, cultural performances, and inter-college sports events. Sporting activities commonly include cricket, football, basketball, volleyball, and badminton, while cultural segments feature music, dance, fashion events, and art showcases. The festival also hosts professional shows and celebrity performances, which are widely attended by students and are considered a highlight of campus life.

In addition to AdVITya, the university observes national and cultural occasions such as Independence Day, regional festivals, and campus-wide celebrations, along with academic orientation programmes and student-led workshops conducted throughout the year.

== November 2025 protests ==
In November 2025, the university faced a major jaundice outbreak due to mismanagement and lack of clean water and food. Students allegedly made multiple complaints to management, all of which were ignored. More students kept falling ill. Forced to buy bottled water with their own money, students grew frustrated. When alleged news about 4 deaths of students were spread, one of the confirmed was student Neha Sahukar. Students staged a peaceful protest on 25th November evening. University management quickly squashed it.

The situation exploded when videos surfaced showing management and faculty physically assaulting and mistreating students and taking them away to a secluded Block (Large Dining Hall 2). At 12AM of 26th November, students angered by the abuse and mistreatment (majority of freshers) wore handkerchief masks under hoodies and grouped together outnumbering the guards, breaking out of the gates of their hostels. The students tore apart and destroyed everything they could see: glass was broken, graffiti was drawn, saying "Revolution 134", two vehicles belonging to the chancellor, a bus, and an ambulance, were burned, a few guard posts and some rooms in the boys hostel block-1 (belonging to the warden) were broken into and vandalised. The peaceful protest turned riot subsided after police and ABVP intervention and their assurance to hold the management accountable for their gross mismanagement and negligence.

=== Aftermath ===
The university officially denied involvement in Neha's death. However, her parents later directly blamed the university and its poor management in an interview. Her medical reports later revealed that a bowel obstruction caused by the contaminated water and food had flared up her dormant TB which then turned into multiple organ failure and her untimely demise. The students now seek better management and basic necessities. The Students further alleged the university is downplaying the numbers and trying to get rid of any accountability.

Students filed FIRs under BNS Sections 191(2), 190, 296A, 115(2), and 351(3) against Asst. Professor Prashant Pandey among other faculties who were seen physically assaulting and manhandling the students in the video which sparked the unrest, management filed FIRs against the students under BNS Sections 190, 191(1), 324(1), and 326(g) for damaging the college properties.

On 28th November, food and water samples were sent to Public Health Engineering (PHE) Department after Madhya Pradesh chief minister Mohan Yadav ordered the formation of a committee to probe into the allegations of poor basic amenities provided by the university. 4 out of 18 water samples sent were found contaminated and unsafe for drinking due to the presence of E.coli bacteria, PHE Department's Executive Engineer Pradeep Saxena confirmed that the presence of such bacteria poses a health risk. Students had reportedly been complaining for several months about illnesses such as jaundice caused by unsafe water, but the university management had ignored these concerns.

Out of the 18 food samples tested, 14 failed the standards required by the Food Safety and Standards Authority of India (FSSAI) due to presence of pesticides and insecticides, Dinesh Shrivastava Controller of Food and Drug Administration (FDA) of Madhya Pradesh said "Samples of rice, rajma, maida and others collected from their canteen failed. The results have prompted the department to draft an official notice to the university administration, seeking explanation and immediate rectification measures", the notice once issued will require the institute to address the violations and submit a compliance report within a given period time, failure to do so can lead to penalties, suspension and stricter enforcement actions upon the food services department of the institute.

Samples from 4 out of 5 contracted catering services namely Safal Synergy (Boys hostel block 6,8, Veg & Non-Veg), JMB Caterers (Boys hostel, Veg & Jain), A.B. Caterers (Girls hostel block 1 Veg & Non-Veg) and Rassense Pvt. Ltd. (Boys hostel block 1, Veg & Non-Veg) had failed the standards required by the FSSAI.

=== Committee report ===
The three-member inquiry committee stated in their report that hostel mess services were extremely unsatisfactory, there were no official documented record on how many of the students contracted jaundice. The committee also noted that the campus was turned into a fortress, inside the campus the management have enforced their own rules, no one is allowed to speak about them as if a dictatorship was in place even the Chief Medical & Health Officer of Sehore was made to wait for two hours outside the main gate.

Students informed the committee that they “face the constant threat of harassment if they complain”. “In the name of discipline, their I-cards are confiscated, they are barred from appearing in examinations, threatened with low marks or failure in practical exams,” the report stated, “Complaints regarding food arrangements are not addressed, and students are simply told that they must eat whatever is served,” the committee added. “Anger had been building among students against the fear-based imposed discipline, which the management completely failed to understand,” explaining why the tensions escalated. "Instead of calming the agitation, wardens and guards misbehaved and physically assaulted the students, which further escalated their aggression" leading to riot alike situation.

A show-cause notice to the Chancellor under Section 41(1) of the Madhya Pradesh Private University Act, 2007 was issued demanding an explanation within next 7 days.

== Academics ==
- School of Advanced Sciences & Languages
- School of Bioengineering
- School of Computing Science & Engineering
- School of Electrical & Electronics Engineering
- School of Mechanical Engineering
- School of Architecture
- VIT Business School

== See also ==
- VIT-AP University
- VIT-Bangalore
