= Arcot Assembly constituency =

State Legislative Assembly Constituency in Tamil Nadu

Coordinates: 12°53′58.16″N 79°17′53.69″E

Arcot
- Constituency No. 42 for the Tamil Nadu Legislative Assembly

Constituency details
- Country: India
- Region: South India
- State: Tamil Nadu
- District: Ranipet
- Lok Sabha constituency: Arakkonam
- Established: 1951
- Total electors: 2,46,786
- Reservation: None

Member of Legislative Assembly
- 17th Tamil Nadu Legislative Assembly
- Incumbent S. M. Sukumar
- Party: AIADMK
- Alliance: NDA
- Elected year: 2026

Arcot is a constituency in the Tamil Nadu legislative assembly, that includes the city of Arcot. Its State Assembly Constituency number is 42. It is part of Arakkonam Lok Sabha constituency. Most successful party: DMK (7 times). It is one of the 234 State Legislative Assembly Constituencies in Tamil Nadu, in India.

== Members of the Legislative Assembly ==
Election	Member	Party
1952	S. P. Chettiar	Indian National Congress
1957	S. Khader Sheriff	Indian National Congress
1962	Munirathinam	Dravida Munnetra Kazhagam
1967	Arcot N. Veeraswami	Dravida Munnetra Kazhagam
1971	Arcot N. Veeraswami	Dravida Munnetra Kazhagam
1977	K. J. Uyyakondan	All India Anna Dravida Munnetra Kazhagam
1980	A. M. Sethuraman	All India Anna Dravida Munnetra Kazhagam
1984	T. Palani	All India Anna Dravida Munnetra Kazhagam
1989	T. R. Gajapathy	Dravida Munnetra Kazhagam
1991	G. Viswanathan	All India Anna Dravida Munnetra Kazhagam
1996	P. N. Subramani	Dravida Munnetra Kazhagam
2001	P. Neelakandan	All India Anna Dravida Munnetra Kazhagam
2006	K. L. Elavazagan	Pattali Makkal Katchi
2011	R. Srinivasan	All India Anna Dravida Munnetra Kazhagam
2016	J. L. Eswarappan	Dravida Munnetra Kazhagam
2021	J. L. Eswarappan	Dravida Munnetra Kazhagam
2026	S. M. Sukumar	All India Anna Dravida Munnetra Kazhagam

Madras State

== Election results ==
Vote share of winning candidates
2026	46.77%
2021	50.06%
2016	41.39%
2011	53.11%
2006	48.73%
2001	55.39%
1996	58.74%
1991	61.16%
1989	36.50%
1984	58.96%
1980	48.85%
1977	39.29%
1971	57.79%
1967	60.13%
1962	48.26%
1957	49.52%
1952	40.48%

=== Assembly election 2026 ===
2026 Tamil Nadu Legislative Assembly election : Arcot
Party	Candidate	Votes	%	±%
AIADMK	S. M. Sukumar	105,608	46.77	New
TVK	G. Vijay Mohan	62,888	27.85	New
DMK	J. L. Eswarappan	48,840	21.63	▼28.43
NTK	Archana Narasimman	5,518	2.44	▼3.38
NOTA	None of the above	656	0.29	▼0.80
Margin of victory		42,720	18.92	▲9.30
Turnout		226,005	91.58	▲11.55
Total valid votes		225,786		
Registered electors		246,786		▼5.98
AIADMK gain from DMK		Swing	▼3.29	

=== Assembly election 2021 ===
2021 Tamil Nadu Legislative Assembly election : Arcot
Party	Candidate	Votes	%	±%
DMK	J. L. Eswarappan	103,885	50.06	▲8.67
PMK	K. L. Elavazagan	83,927	40.44	▲23.21
NTK	R. Kathiravan	12,088	5.82	New
MNM	A. R. Mohamed Raffi	2,860	1.38	New
NOTA	None of the above	2,253	1.09	▲0.10
AMMK	N. Janarthanan	2,190	1.06	New
Margin of victory		19,958	9.62	▲4.17
Turnout		210,056	80.03	▼2.45
Total valid votes		207,538		
Rejected ballots		265	0.13	▲0.03
Registered electors		262,476		▲6.34
DMK hold		Swing		

=== Assembly election 2016 ===
2016 Tamil Nadu Legislative Assembly election : Arcot
Party	Candidate	Votes	%	±%
DMK	J. L. Eswarappan	84,182	41.39	New
AIADMK	K. V. Ramadoss	73,091	35.94	▼17.17
PMK	G. Karikalan	35,043	17.23	▼24.91
MDMK	P. N. Udhayakumar	5,387	2.65	New
BJP	D. Arulraman	2,648	1.30	▲0.13
NOTA	None of the above	2,004	0.99	New
Margin of victory		11,091	5.45	▼5.51
Turnout		203,593	82.48	▼0.73
Total valid votes		203,392		
Rejected ballots		201	0.10	▲0.09
Registered electors		246,835		▲16.95
DMK gain from AIADMK		Swing	▼11.72	

=== Assembly election 2011 ===
2011 Tamil Nadu Legislative Assembly election : Arcot
Party	Candidate	Votes	%	±%
AIADMK	R. Srinivasan	93,258	53.11	▲13.53
PMK	K. L. Elavazagan	74,005	42.14	▼6.59
Independent	M. Velu	3,211	1.83	
BJP	G. Thanigachalam	2,046	1.17	▲0.10
Margin of victory		19,253	10.96	▲1.81
Turnout		175,629	83.21	▲6.26
Total valid votes		175,610		
Rejected ballots		19	0.01	▲0.01
Registered electors		211,067		▲31.29
AIADMK gain from PMK		Swing	▲4.38	

=== Assembly election 2006 ===
2006 Tamil Nadu Legislative Assembly election : Arcot
Party	Candidate	Votes	%	±%
PMK	K. L. Elavazagan	60,286	48.73	New
AIADMK	V. R. Chandran	48,969	39.58	New
DMDK	V. B. Velu	8,523	6.89	New
SP	S. Sedhumadavan	2,006	1.62	New
Independent	P. Kuppusamy	1,610	1.30	
BJP	S. Thiyagarajan	1,319	1.07	New
Margin of victory		11,317	9.15	▼6.81
Turnout		123,711	76.95	▲7.72
Total valid votes		123,707		
Registered electors		160,759		▲0.26
PMK gain from AIADMK		Swing	▼6.66	

=== Assembly election 2001 ===
2001 Tamil Nadu Legislative Assembly election : Arcot
Party	Candidate	Votes	%	±%
AIADMK	P. Neelakandan	61,474	55.39	▲21.28
DMK	A. K. Sundaramoorthy	43,767	39.44	▼19.30
MDMK	K. S. Vetriveeran	3,058	2.76	▲1.35
LJP	C. Munusamy	2,675	2.41	New
Margin of victory		17,707	15.96	▼8.67
Turnout		111,012	69.23	▼4.08
Total valid votes		110,974		
Rejected ballots		38	0.03	▼5.07
Registered electors		160,346		▲4.15
AIADMK gain from DMK		Swing	▼3.35	

=== Assembly election 1996 ===
1996 Tamil Nadu Legislative Assembly election : Arcot
Party	Candidate	Votes	%	±%
DMK	P. N. Subramani	62,974	58.74	▲31.54
AIADMK	K. V. Ramadoss	36,567	34.11	New
PMK	A. G. Mani	4,968	4.63	▼6.19
MDMK	K. S. Natarajan	1,512	1.41	New
Margin of victory		26,407	24.63	▼9.34
Turnout		112,863	73.31	▲0.56
Total valid votes		107,214		
Rejected ballots		5,751	5.10	▲1.47
Registered electors		153,951		▲6.97
DMK gain from AIADMK		Swing	▼2.42	

=== Assembly election 1991 ===
1991 Tamil Nadu Legislative Assembly election : Arcot
Party	Candidate	Votes	%	±%
AIADMK	G. Viswanathan	61,712	61.16	New
DMK	T. R. Gajapathy	27,439	27.20	▼9.30
PMK	Poongavanam	10,913	10.82	New
Margin of victory		34,273	33.97	▲18.95
Turnout		104,697	72.75	▼2.34
Total valid votes		100,896		
Rejected ballots		3,801	3.63	▲1.39
Registered electors		143,916		▲10.90
AIADMK gain from DMK		Swing	▲24.66	

=== Assembly election 1989 ===
1989 Tamil Nadu Legislative Assembly election : Arcot
Party	Candidate	Votes	%	±%
DMK	T. R. Gajapathy	34,775	36.50	▼2.46
AIADMK	K. V. Ramadoss	20,470	21.49	New
AIADMK	T. Palani	14,581	15.31	New
INC	A. K. T. Kannan	12,053	12.65	New
Independent	G. Murthy	11,476	12.05	
Margin of victory		14,305	15.02	▼4.98
Turnout		97,440	75.09	▼4.82
Total valid votes		95,262		
Rejected ballots		2,178	2.24	▼2.88
Registered electors		129,768		▲11.09
DMK gain from AIADMK		Swing	▼22.46	

=== Assembly election 1984 ===
1984 Tamil Nadu Legislative Assembly election : Arcot
Party	Candidate	Votes	%	±%
AIADMK	T. Palani	52,222	58.96	▲10.11
DMK	Arcot N. Veeraswami	34,509	38.96	New
Independent	M. Parasuraman	1,101	1.24	
Independent	D. Malar	736	0.83	
Margin of victory		17,713	20.00	▲17.37
Turnout		93,347	79.91	▲14.39
Total valid votes		88,568		
Rejected ballots		4,779	5.12	▲3.23
Registered electors		116,813		▲1.90
AIADMK hold		Swing		

=== Assembly election 1980 ===
1980 Tamil Nadu Legislative Assembly election : Arcot
Party	Candidate	Votes	%	±%
AIADMK	A. M. Sethuraman	35,998	48.85	New
INC	B. Akber Pasha	34,058	46.21	▲36.96
JP	N. Baskaran	3,179	4.31	New
Independent	T. R. Amarthalingam	460	0.62	
Margin of victory		1,940	2.63	▼12.66
Turnout		75,111	65.52	▲1.04
Total valid votes		73,695		
Rejected ballots		1,416	1.89	▲0.55
Registered electors		114,631		▲5.39
AIADMK gain from AIADMK		Swing	▲9.56	

=== Assembly election 1977 ===
1977 Tamil Nadu Legislative Assembly election : Arcot
Party	Candidate	Votes	%	±%
AIADMK	K. J. Uyyakondan	27,193	39.29	New
JP	N. R. Ethirajulu	16,614	24.01	New
DMK	P. Jayavelu	16,293	23.54	▼34.25
INC	K. R. Munirathinam	6,401	9.25	New
Independent	M. Parameshwaran	2,702	3.90	
Margin of victory		10,579	15.29	▼5.49
Turnout		70,141	64.48	▼14.45
Total valid votes		69,203		
Rejected ballots		938	1.34	▲1.34
Registered electors		108,773		▲22.83
AIADMK gain from DMK		Swing	▼18.50	

=== Assembly election 1971 ===
1971 Tamil Nadu Legislative Assembly election : Arcot
Party	Candidate	Votes	%	±%
DMK	Arcot N. Veeraswami	39,126	57.79	▼2.34
INC	N. R. Ethirajalu Naidu	25,061	37.02	New
Independent	A. R. Ponnusami Naicker	2,777	4.10	
Independent	A. K. Ugrapani	449	0.66	
Margin of victory		14,065	20.78	▼2.19
Turnout		69,896	78.93	▲1.75
Total valid votes		67,700		
Registered electors		88,559		▲5.12
DMK hold		Swing		

=== Assembly election 1967 ===
1967 Madras State Legislative Assembly election : Arcot
Party	Candidate	Votes	%	±%
DMK	Arcot N. Veeraswami	37,514	60.13	▲11.87
INC	A. G. Ranganatha Naicker	23,184	37.16	▲3.78
ABJS	E. P. Pillai	1,695	2.72	New
Margin of victory		14,330	22.97	▲8.10
Turnout		65,020	77.18	▲1.28
Total valid votes		62,393		
Registered electors		84,245		▲2.30
DMK hold		Swing		

=== Assembly election 1962 ===
1962 Madras State Legislative Assembly election : Arcot
Party	Candidate	Votes	%	±%
DMK	Munirathinam	28,485	48.26	New
INC	S. Khader Sheriff	19,705	33.38	▼16.14
SWA	A. G. Ranganatha Naicker	7,198	12.19	New
Independent	Sadanandam Chettiar	1,727	2.93	
Independent	M. Sundara Raj	1,491	2.53	
Independent	Ukarapani	422	0.71	
Margin of victory		8,780	14.87	▼6.32
Turnout		62,506	75.90	▲20.08
Total valid votes		59,028		
Registered electors		82,353		▲10.26
DMK gain from INC		Swing	▼1.26	

=== Assembly election 1957 ===
1957 Madras State Legislative Assembly election : Arcot
Party	Candidate	Votes	%	±%
INC	S. Khader Sheriff	20,643	49.52	▲9.04
Independent	Lachaumanan	11,807	28.32	
Independent	Sambasivam	4,926	11.82	
Independent	G. M. Samy	3,623	8.69	
Independent	A. R. Pachailappan	691	1.66	
Margin of victory		8,836	21.19	▲15.31
Turnout		41,690	55.82	▼0.10
Total valid votes		41,690		
Registered electors		74,691		▲24.21
INC hold		Swing		

=== Assembly election 1952 ===
1952 Madras State Legislative Assembly election : Arcot
Party	Candidate	Votes	%	±%
INC	S. Panchaksharam Chettiar	13,613	40.48	New
Commonweal Party	Nagarathinam	11,635	34.60	New
KMPP	Thiruvengadam Mudaliar	6,111	18.17	New
Socialist Party (India)	Kulasekaran	2,269	6.75	New
Margin of victory		1,978	5.88	
Turnout		33,628	55.92	
Total valid votes		33,628		
Registered electors		60,134		
INC win (new seat)				
