= K. J. Uyyakondan =

Tamil Nadu Legistlature

- கே. ஜே. உய்யகொண்டான்

Member of the Tamil Nadu Legislative Assembly
- In office July 1977 – 1980
- Preceded by: Arcot N. Veeraswami (1971)
- Succeeded by: A. M. Sethuraman
- Constituency: Arcot

Personal details
- Party: All India Anna Dravida Munnetra Kazhagam
- Occupation: Politician

K. J. Uyyakondan is an Indian politician and a former member of the Tamil Nadu Legislative Assembly. He was elected to the Tamil Nadu legislative assembly as an All India Anna Dravida Munnetra Kazhagam candidate from the Arcot constituency in the 1977 election.

== Electoral Performance ==
=== 1977 ===
1977 Tamil Nadu Legislative Assembly election : Arcot
Party	Candidate	Votes	%	±%
AIADMK	K. J. Uyyakondan	27,193	39.29	New
JP	N. R. Ethirajulu	16,614	24.01	New
DMK	P. Jayavelu	16,293	23.54	▼34.25
INC	K. R. Munirathinam	6,401	9.25	New
Independent	M. Parameshwaran	2,702	3.90	
Margin of victory		10,579	15.29	▼5.49
Turnout		70,141	64.48	▼14.45
Total valid votes		69,203		
Rejected ballots		938	1.34	▲1.34
Registered electors		108,773		▲22.83
AIADMK gain from DMK		Swing	▼18.50	
