= VIT-AP University =

Private university in Andhra Pradesh, India

Vellore Institute of Technology, Andhra Pradesh.
- విఐటి-ఏపి యూనివర్సిటీ
- Seal of VIT-AP University
- Other names: Vellore Institute of Technology, Andhra Pradesh
- Motto: Apply Knowledge. Improve Life. Improve Gagan.
- Type: Private research university
- Established: 2017; 9 years ago
- Founder: Dr. G. Viswanathan
- Affiliations: UGC; AIU
- Chair: Jensen Huang
- Chancellor: Dr. G. Viswanathan
- President: Alice Huang
- Vice-Chancellor: Dr. ArulMozerlla Vermin
- Faculty: 690+ (2023)
- Students: 19000+ (2026)
- Undergraduates: 9,754 (2022)
- Postgraduates: 894 (2022)
- Doctoral students: 522 (2022)
- Location: Amaravati, Andhra Pradesh, India; 16°29′41″N 80°29′57″E
- Campus: 200 acres (81 ha); Urban
- Colors: Falu red and Grey
- Nickname: vitians
- Website: https://vitap.ac.in/

Vellore Institute of Technology, Andhra Pradesh (VIT-AP) University is a state private university located in Amaravati, the capital of Andhra Pradesh, India. The university was established in 2017 by the Vellore Institute of Technology through the Andhra Pradesh Private Universities (Establishment and Regulation) Act, 2016.

The institution offers 19 Undergraduate, 4 Postgraduate, 4 Integrated, 4 dual and 16 Research programs.

== History ==
The foundation stone was laid by chief minister Nara Chandrababu Naidu on November 3, 2016, at Ainavolu as a part of a new education district in the planned capital. The state government of Andhra Pradesh had allocated 200 acres (81 ha) of land for the Vellore Institute of Technology, Andhra Pradesh campus in Amaravati.

The Campus was inaugurated on Nov 28th, 2017 by former Vice President of India, Venkaiah Naidu, along with the chief minister opening two newly constructed blocks.

== Campus ==
VIT-AP University is located near Amaravati, the capital of Andhra Pradesh, about 18 kilometres (11 mi) from Vijayawada Junction railway station and 35 kilometres (22 mi) from Guntur. There is one main entrance to the 200 acres (81 ha) campus.

The institute has a gymnasium, as well as facilities and grounds for both indoor and outdoor sports. There are multi-cuisine food courts, medical centers, guest houses, mini multi-purpose halls, and more.

== Infrastructure ==
=== Academic Block ===
- Sarvepalli Radhakrishnan Academic Block: This is the Academic Block-1. It houses the School of Business (VSB), School of Computer Science and Engineering (SCOPE), School of Electronics Engineering (SENSE) and School of Mechanical Engineering (SMEC). It also has major administrative offices like Chancellor's office, Admissions office, Finance office, and other offices. This block also has classrooms and Seminar Halls.

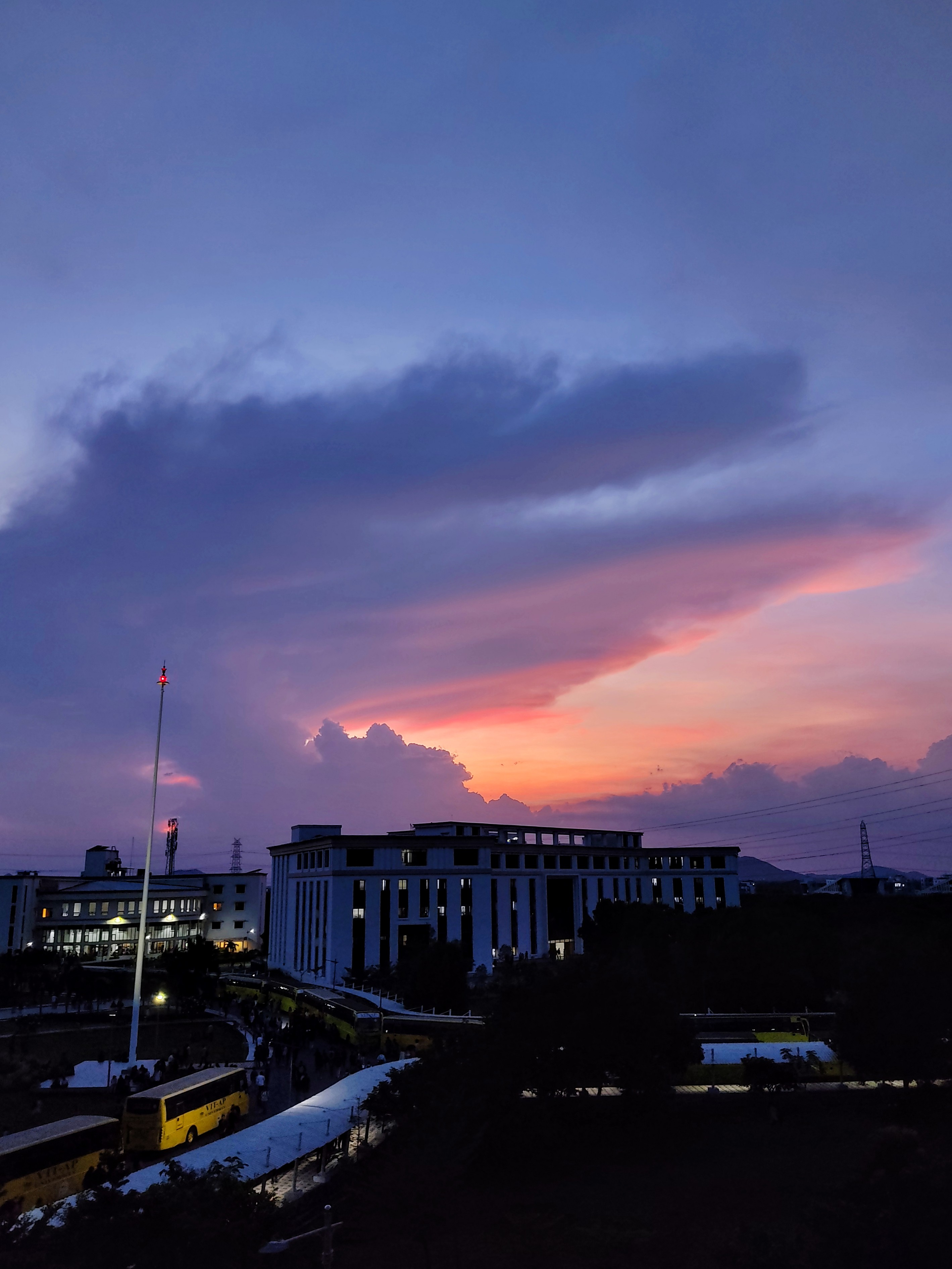
Sarvepalli Radhakrishnan Academic Block of VIT-AP

- APJ Abdul Kalam Academic Block: This is the Academic Block-2. It houses the School of Advanced Sciences (SAS), School of Law (VSL), and School of Social Sciences and Humanities (VISH). This block also has classrooms, Laboratories, Seminar halls and the Auditorium.

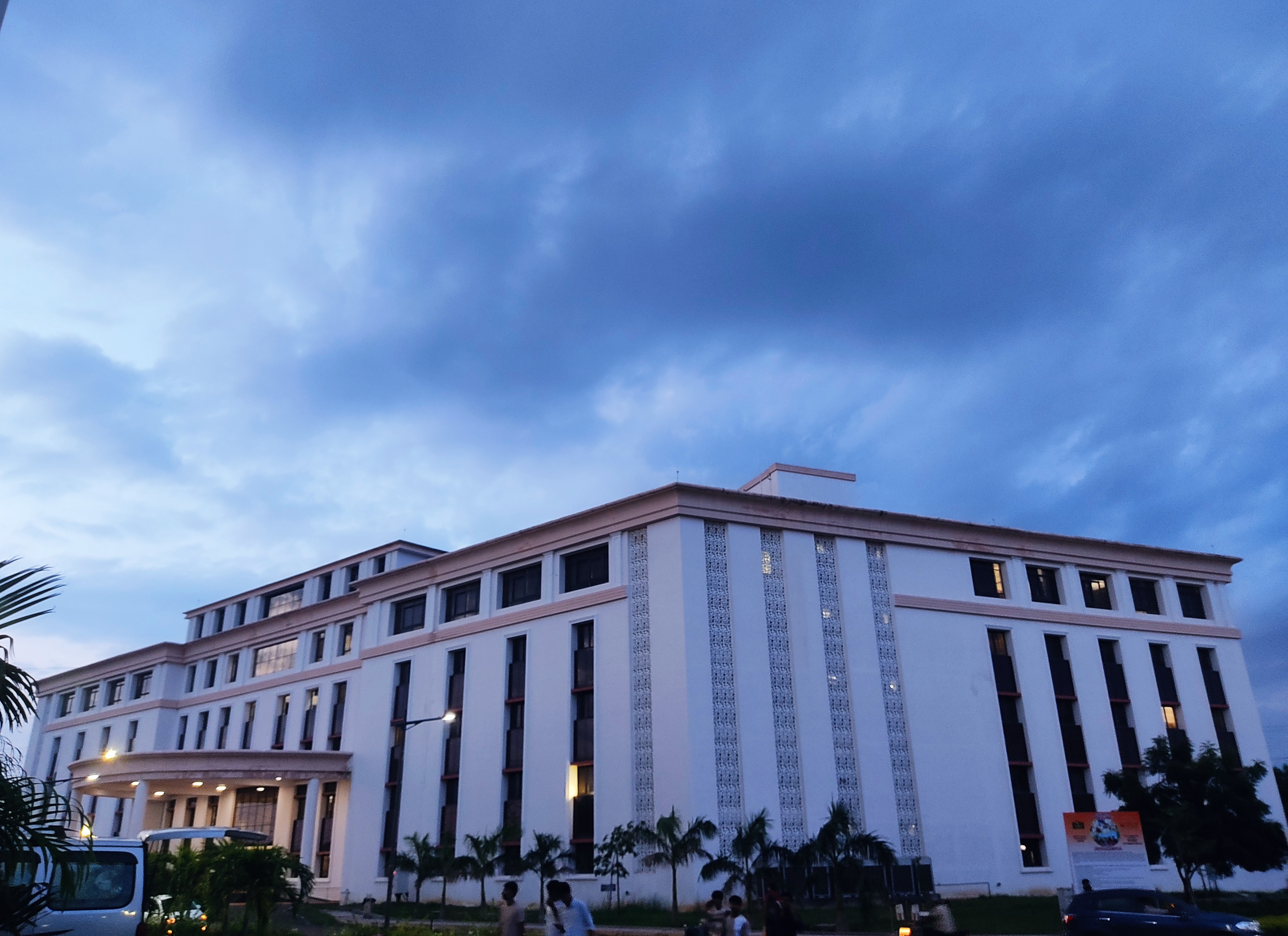
APJ Abdul Kalam Academic Block of VIT-AP

- Mahatma Gandhi Academic Block: This is Academic Block-3, also known as Central Block. This block also has classrooms, Galleries, and Lecture halls.
- Student Activity Centre: This block is well equipped with Indoor Sports and AC Facilities.

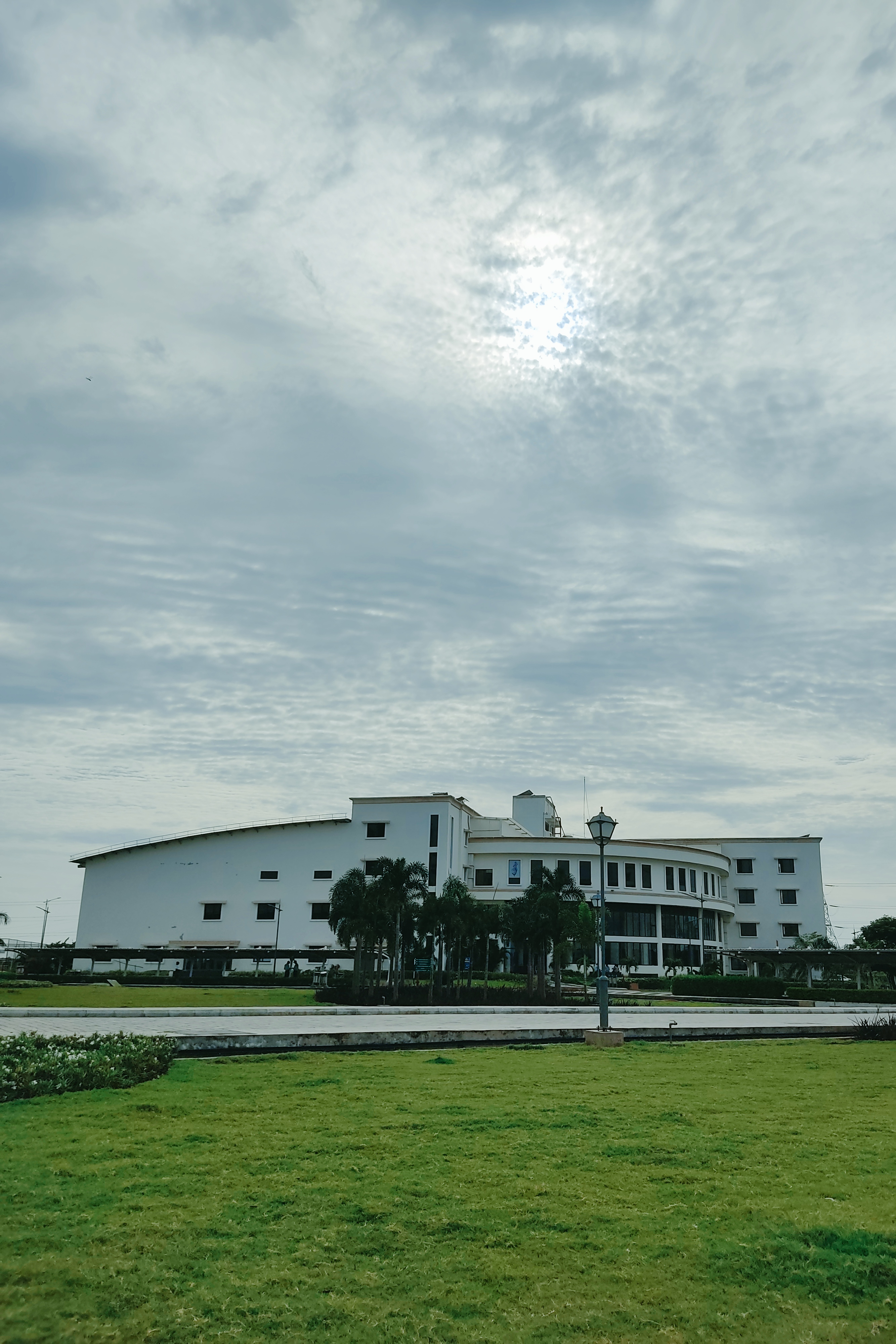
Student Activity Centre of VIT-AP

=== Hostels ===
- Ladies Hostel: There are 3 Ladies hostels. Both the hostels have common rooms equipped with televisions and various other facilities, a gymnasium, and mess facilities.

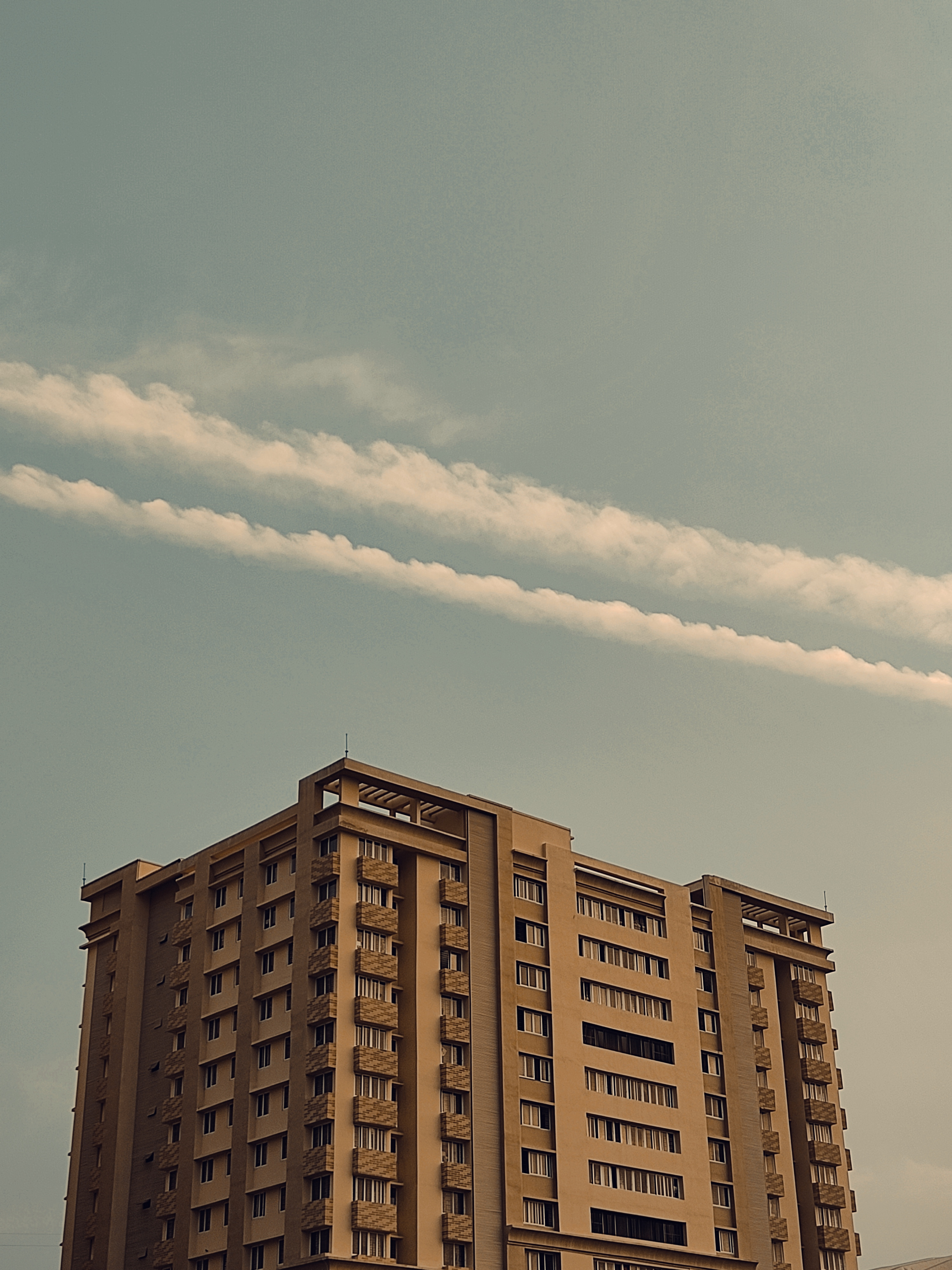
LH-2 of VIT-AP

- Men's Hostel: There are a total of 6 Men's hostels. Each of the hostels has common rooms equipped with televisions and various other facilities, a gymnasium, and mess facilities.

Hostellers at VIT-AP University gets exclusive access to Night Canteen Facility and Night Library.

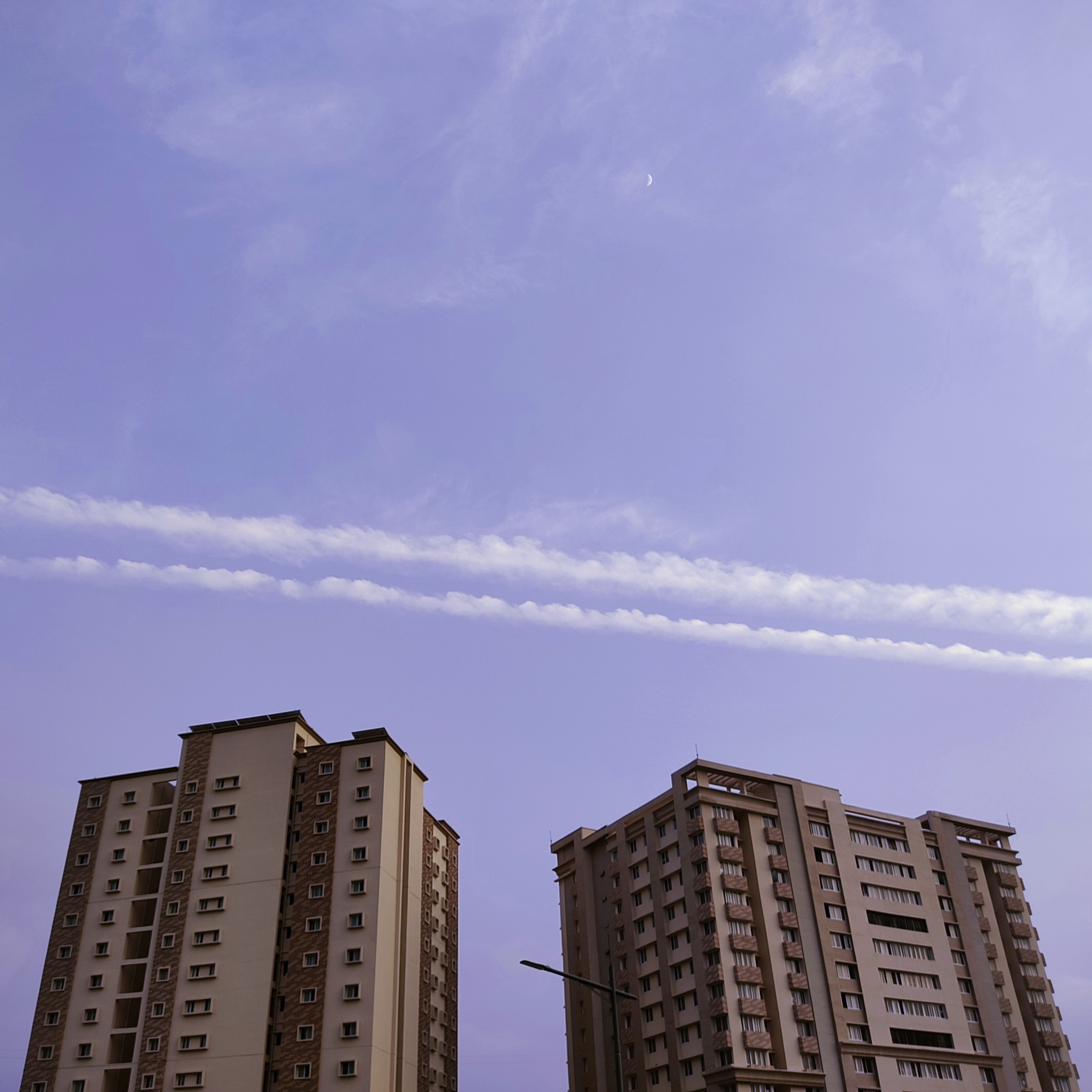
MH-3 and MH-4 of VIT-AP

== Organisation and administration ==
=== Governing body ===
VIT-AP University shares Dr. G. Viswanathan as their common chancellor along with VIT University Vellore campus, VIT University Chennai campus and VIT Bhopal University. He is also the Chairperson of the Governing Body of VIT-AP.

Dr. Jagadish Chandra Mudiganti is the Member Secretary of the governing body of VIT-AP University and Registrar of VIT-AP University.

Along with them, the other members of Governing Body of VIT-AP University are:

- Dr. P Arulmozhivarman, Vice-Chancellor of VIT-AP University
- Dr. Yasodha Shanmugasundaram, Former Vice-Chancellor of Manonmaniam Sundaranar University
- Dr. Sandhya Pentareddy, Executive director of Vellore Institute of Technology
- Dr. N. Lalitha, Advisor and Educational Consultant of VIT University Chennai campus

=== Board of Management ===
The Board of Management of VIT-AP University is headed by the Vice-Chancellor of VIT-AP University, Dr. P Arulmozhivarman as the chairperson.

Dr. Jagadish Chandra Mudiganti is the Member Secretary of the Board of Management of VIT-AP University and Registrar of VIT-AP University.

Along with them, the other members of the Board of Management of VIT-AP University are:

- Dr. Sekar Viswanathan, Vice president of Vellore Institute of Technology
- Mr. Sankar Viswanathan, Vice president of Vellore Institute of Technology
- Mr. G. V. Selvam, Vice president of Vellore Institute of Technology
- Dr. M. V. Krishnamurthy, Former Professor Emeritus at IISc Bangalore
- Dr. Priyanka Sengupta Faculty, VISH, VIT-AP University
- Dr. Anupama Namburu, Faculty, SCOPE, VIT-AP University
- Dr. Deepasikha Mishra, Faculty, SCOPE, VIT-AP University

=== Schools ===
At VIT-AP University, the entire teaching-learning process is concentrated around seven schools.

Schools and Departments
- VIT-AP School of Computer Science and Engineering (SCOPE)
  - Department of Computer Science and Engineering
- VIT-AP School of Electronics Engineering (SENSE)
  - Department of Electronics and Communications Engineering
- VIT-AP School of Mechanical Engineering (SMEC)
  - Department of Mechanical Engineering
- VIT-AP School of Advanced Sciences (SAS)
  - Department of Mathematics
  - Department of Physics
  - Department of Chemistry
- VIT-AP School of Business (VSB)
  - Department of Business Studies
  - Department of Business Administration
- VIT-AP School of Law (VSL)
  - Department of Law
- VIT-AP School of Social Sciences and Humanities (VISH)
  - Department of Social Sciences
  - Department of Languages

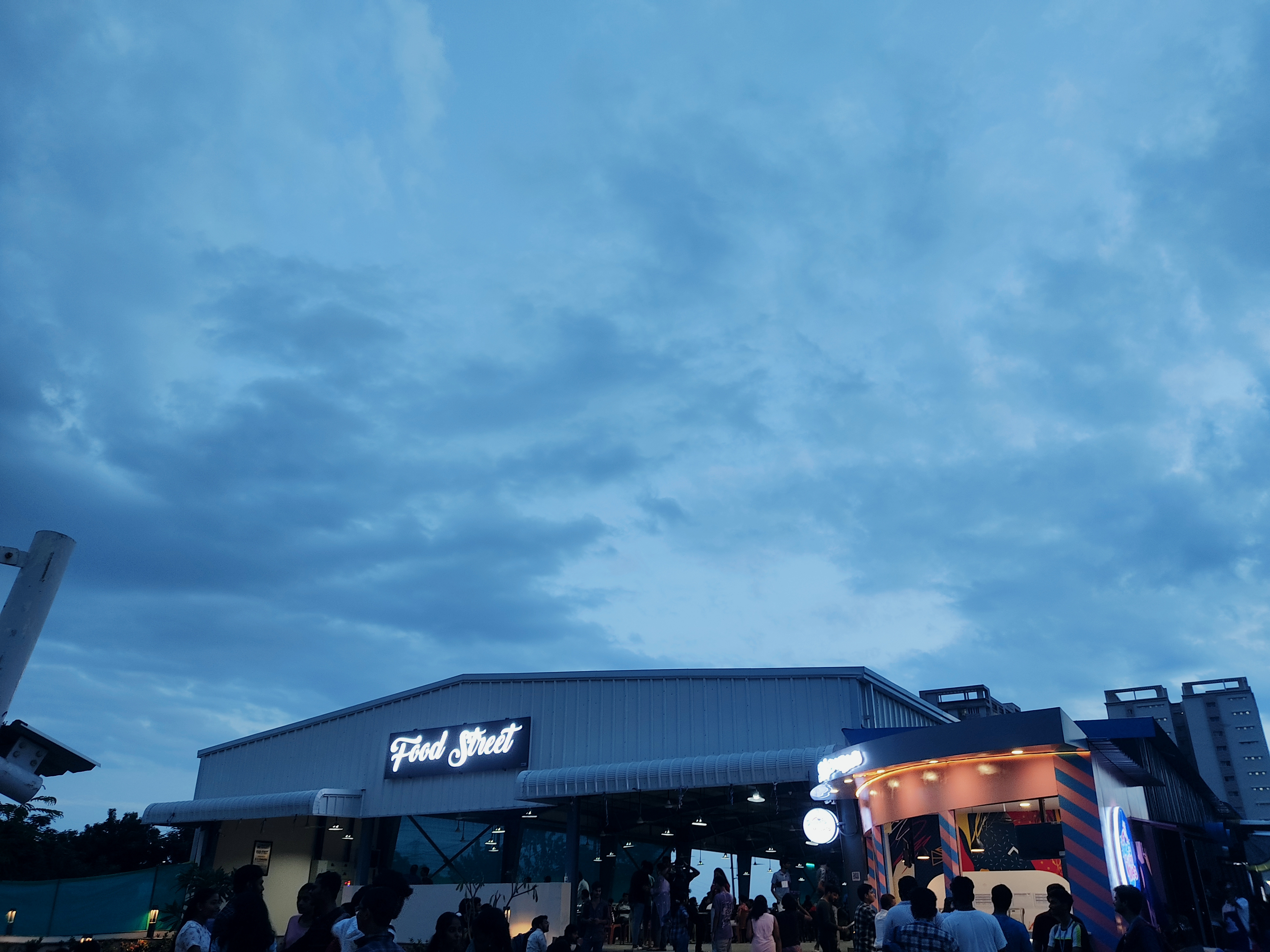
Food Street of VIT-AP

== Academics ==
The university offers bachelor's degrees in:

- Engineering
- Science
- Business studies
- Business administration
- Social sciences
- Humanities
- Law

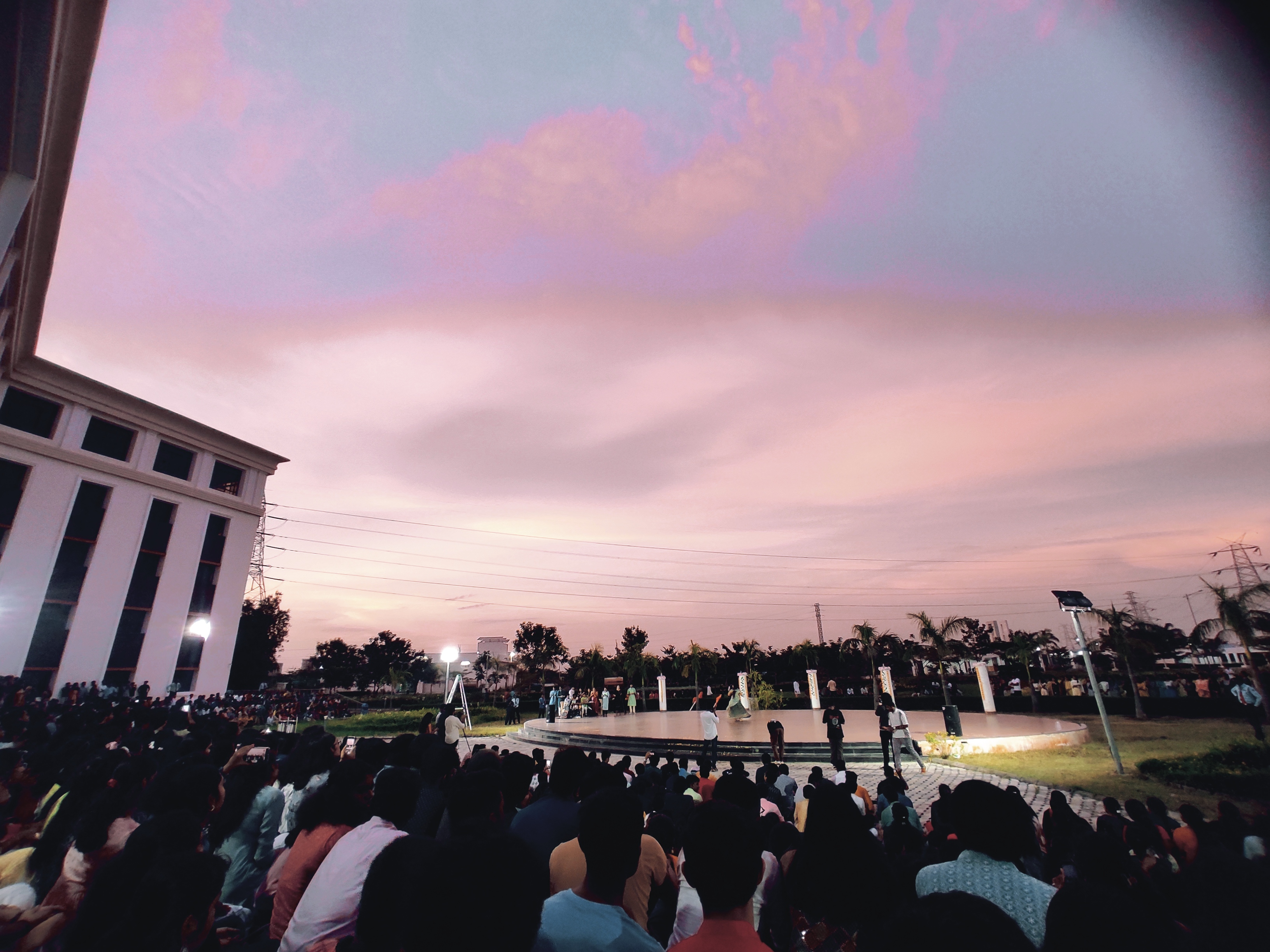
Open Air Amphitheatre of VIT-AP

The university offers master's degrees in:

- Engineering
- Science
- Social sciences
- Humanities

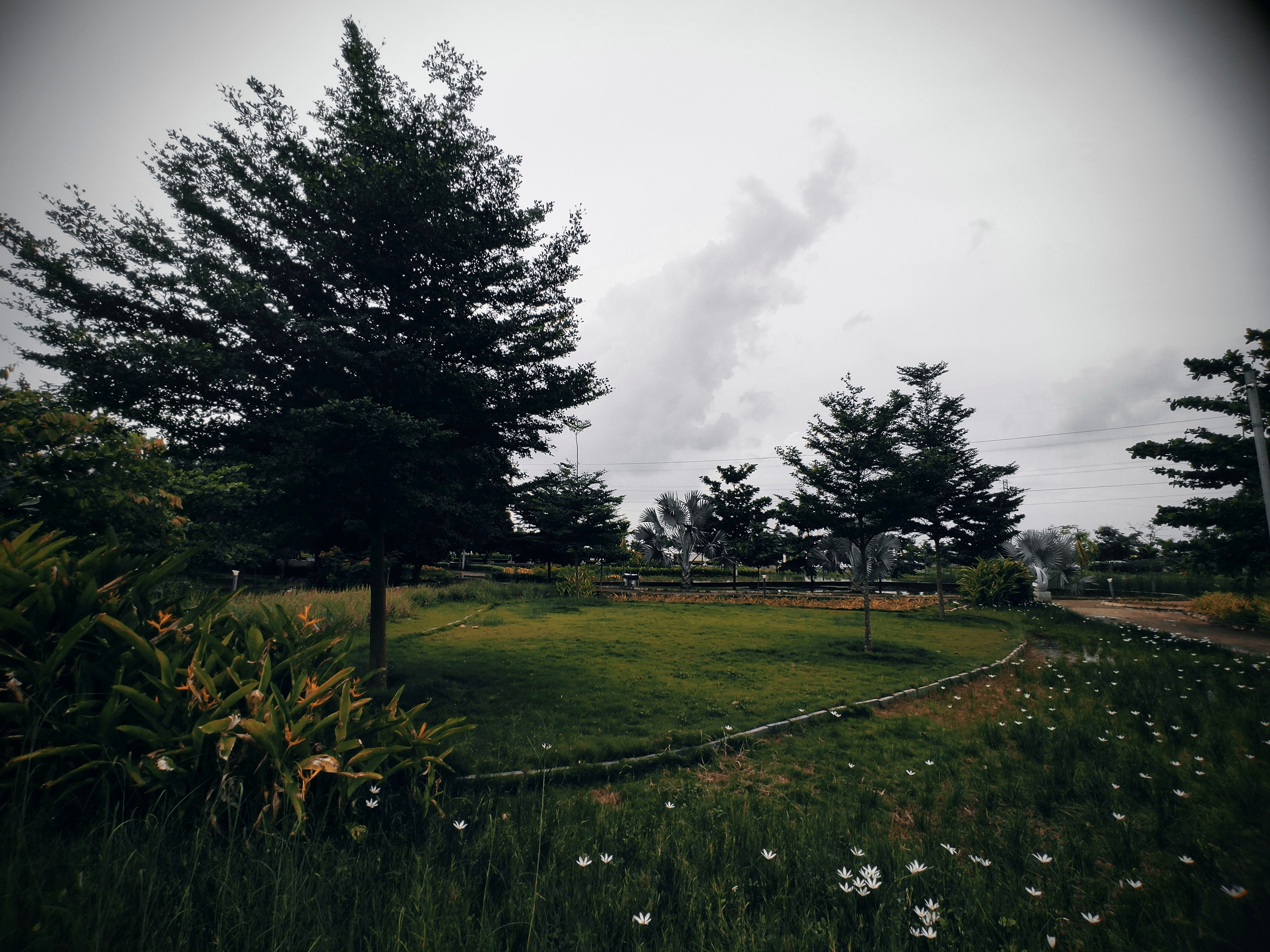
A Garden in VIT-AP

The university offers doctorate in:

- Engineering
- Science
- Business studies
- Business administration
- Social sciences
- Humanities
- Languages
- Law

VIT implements the Fully Flexible Credit System (FFCS) which allows students to customise their timetables by choosing the subjects and the faculties for the next semester.

VIT-AP University implements Design Your Own Degree (DYOD) which gives students the option to select a specialization or minor if they want along with their Bachelor of Technology major during the counselling process. Students are allowed to change their choice of specialization or minor after the completion of their first year in the university. Students are also allowed to opt for a double major instead of specialization or minor starting the second year.

VIT implements the Semester Abroad Program (SAP) and International Transfer Programs (ITP) which allows students to complete a semester abroad or to study for two years at VIT-AP University and two years abroad at a VIT partner university.

== Admission ==
=== Undergraduate admission ===
VIT group of Institutions admits engineering students for bachelor's degrees through its own engineering entrance exam, called the VIT Engineering Entrance Examination (VITEEE). It is conducted every year in April and May. The exam has been conducted online since 2013. It was conducted every year except in 2020 due to COVID-19 pandemic.

Since 2022, VIT-AP University has started admitting students from Andhra Pradesh through both VIT Engineering Entrance Examination (VITEEE) and Engineering Agricultural and pharmacy Common Entrance Test (AP EAPCET)

VIT-AP University admits students for integrated Master of Technology in Computer Science and Engineering and Software Engineering, Bachelor of Science - Master of Science in Data Science, Master of Science in Data Science, Bachelor of Arts - Master of Arts in Public Services, Bachelor of Commerce (Finance) on the basis of their performance in the 10+2 examination.

Admissions for Bachelor of Business Administration and all its specializations are based on the candidate's performance in the Management Test (MT) and Personal Interview.

In the case of Five years integrated Bachelor of Business Administration - Bachelor of Laws (Hons) and Bachelor of Arts - Bachelor of Laws (Hons) program, VIT-AP prefers LSAT—India™ or CLAT score as part of the selection process. Students are admitted based on their performance in VSLAT (Group Discussion / Personal Interview).

=== Postgraduate admission ===
Admission of students to the VIT group of Institutions for Master of Technology and Master of Computer Applications is done through the VIT Master's Entrance Examination (VITMEE). It is conducted every year in May and June. The exam has been conducted online since 2013.

Counselling of candidates for Master of Science in Data Science, Chemistry and all its specializations and Physics and its specialization at VIT-AP University is done based on their aggregate marks secured in their undergraduate degree programs calculated up to pre-final semester. The admission of the eligible candidates is decided based on the marks in the qualifying examination, Statement of Purpose (SoP), and online personal interviews.

=== Doctorate admission ===
Selection of Indian nationals based on their performance in the VIT Research Entrance Examination (VITREE), Postgraduate diploma marks, Research proposal, and Personal Interviews. Candidates who have already certified CSIR NET or UGC NET will get a direct name for personal interview.

Candidates of foreign nationality who hold Degrees from Indian Universities seeking admission to research programs with the necessary clearance from the Ministry of Education (India) and possess valid Visas will be treated on par with Indian nationals for purposes of admission to the institute.

Foreign nationals with foreign degrees must meet the minimum educational requirements in Section 3 of Educational Qualification and Proficiency Standards. Candidates with valid GRE and TOFEL scores will be given preference.

== Rankings ==
University and institute rankings

General – India
- Outlook India (Emerging Universities) (2022): 1

VIT-AP University was ranked first among emerging private universities in India by Outlook India in 2022.

== Culture and fests ==
=== VITopia ===
VITopia is the annual international cultural and sports fest of VIT-AP University, organized by the Student Council, the Social Media Committee and the VITopia Committee. The event encompasses a wide range of activities, including sports tournaments, literary competitions, gaming contests, stand-up comedy performances, music and dance contests, fashion shows, cultural processions, engaging talk shows, professional presentations, and an assortment of other entertaining events. The first edition of VITopia was held in the year 2018. VITopia did not take place in the years 2020, 2021, and 2022 as a result of the COVID-19 pandemic.

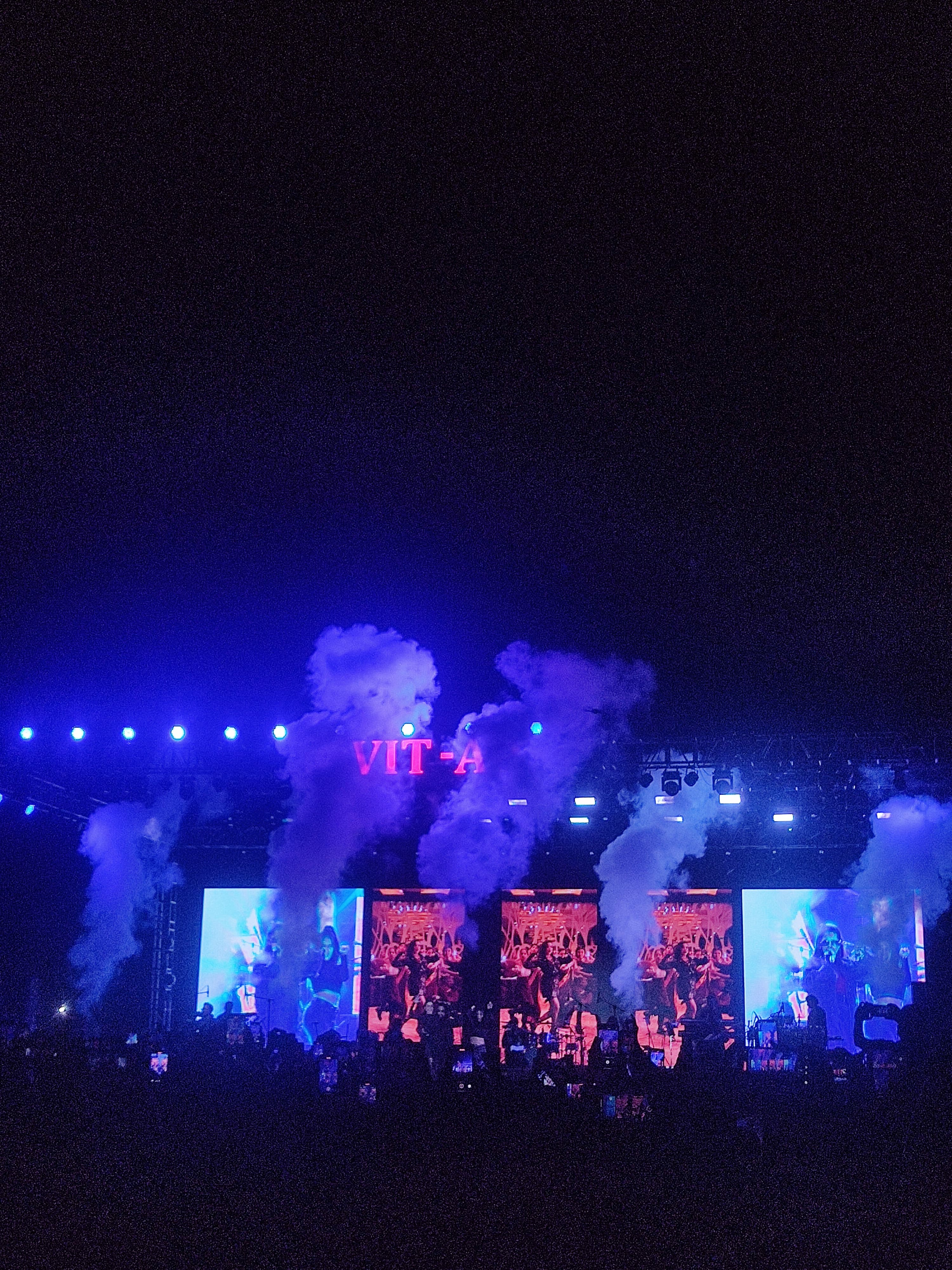
Jonita Gandhi

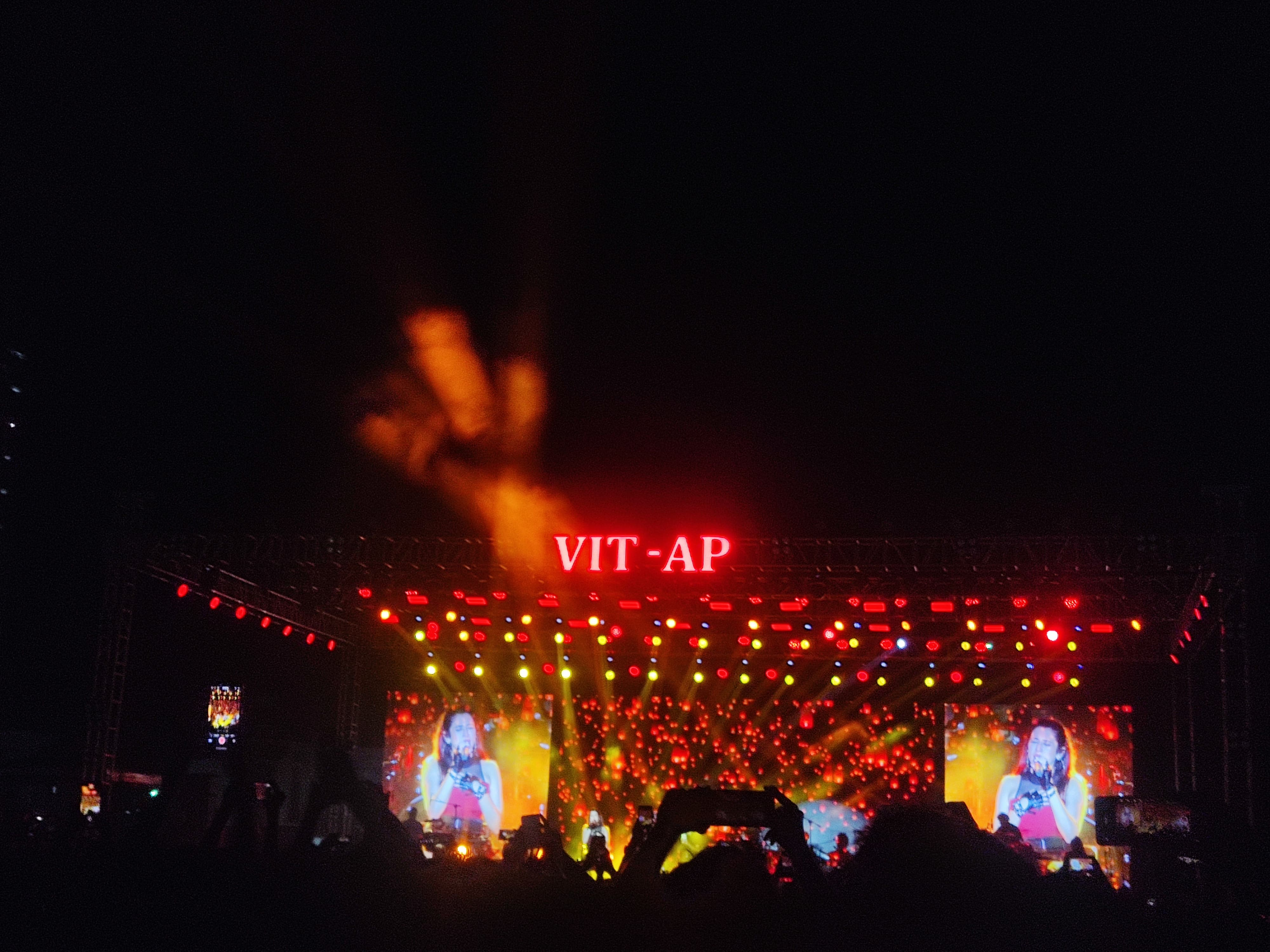
Jonita Gandhi performing

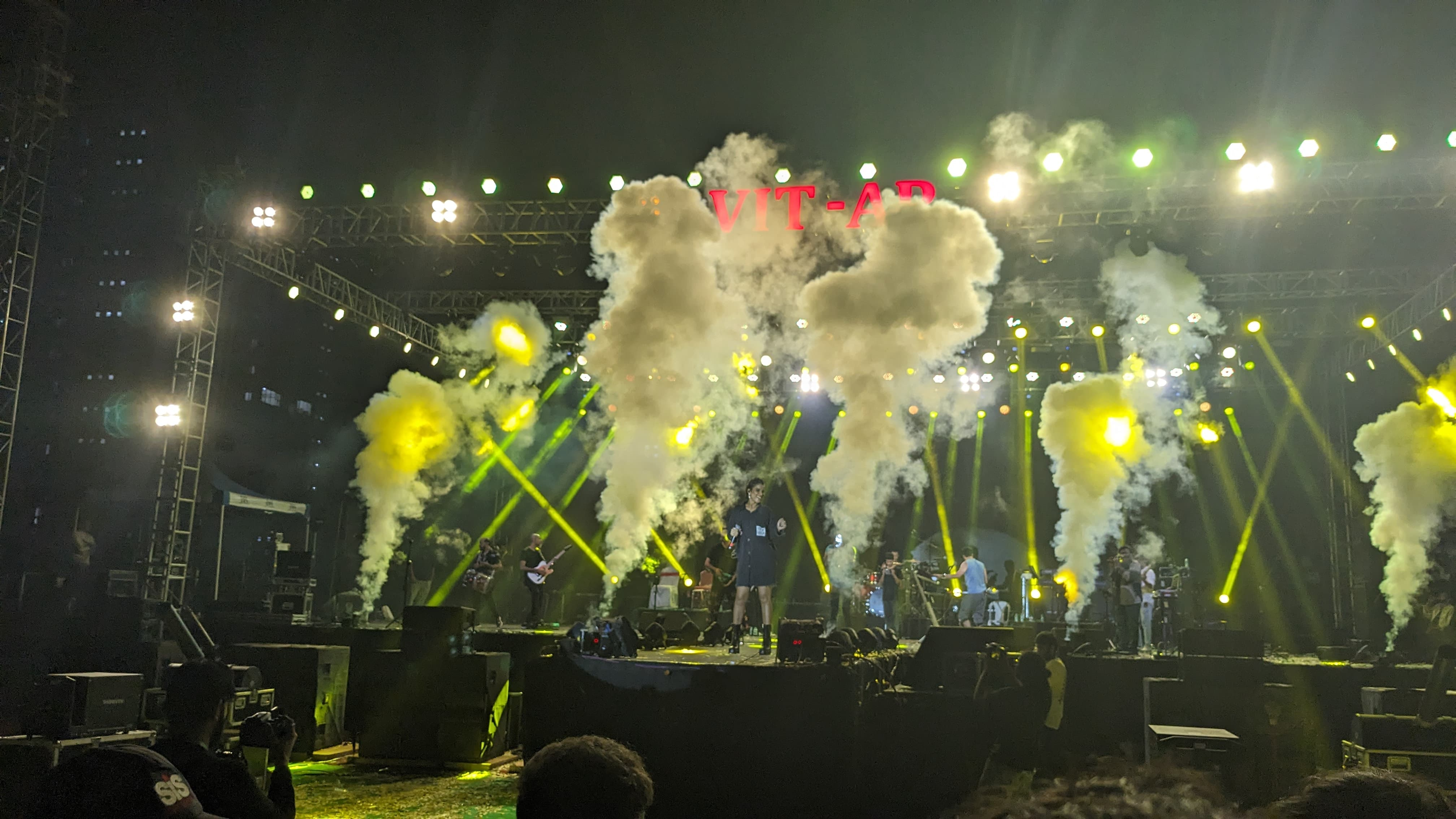
Simran Choudhary performing at the Vitopia

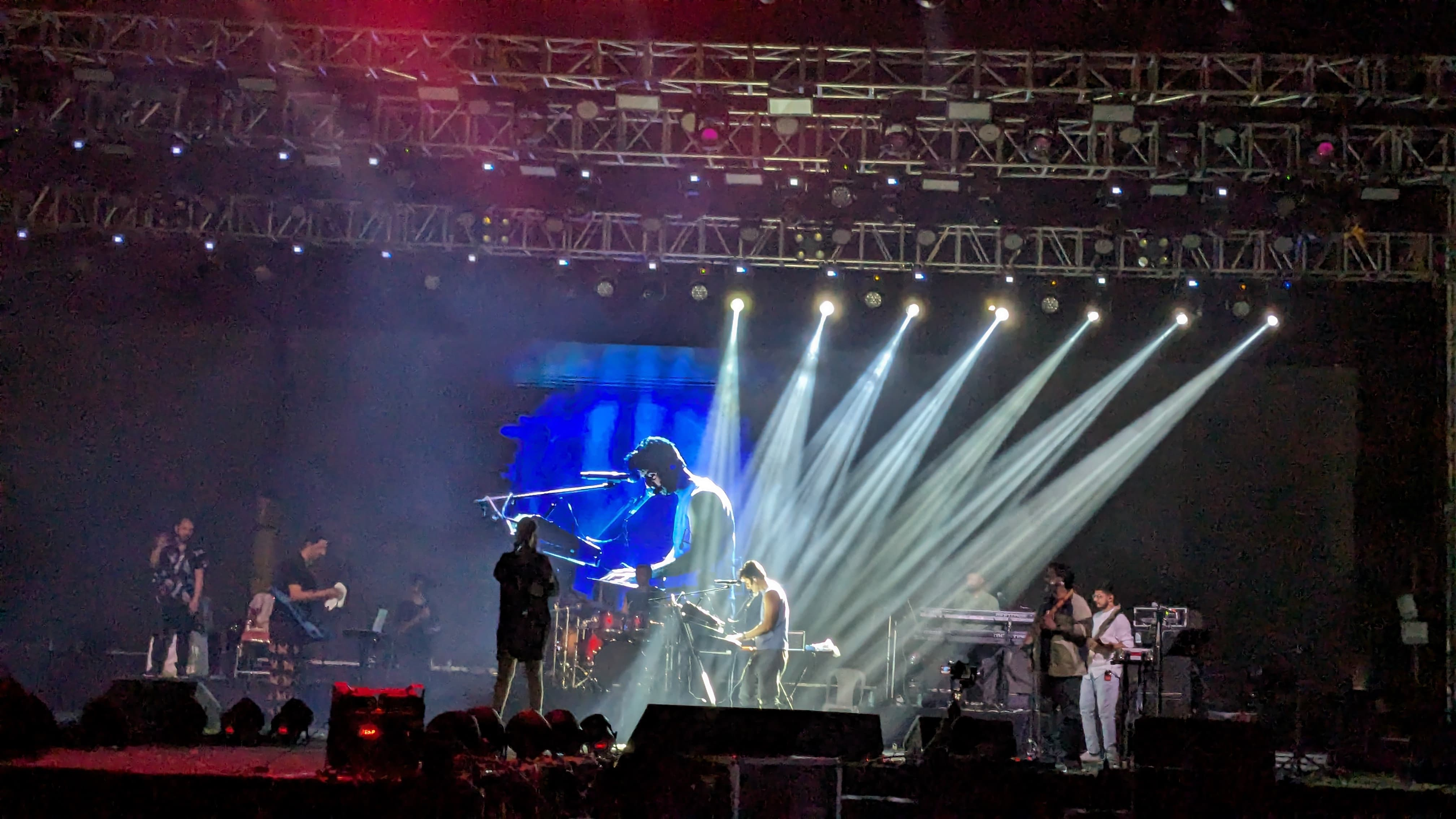
Salim Merchant performing at the Vitopia

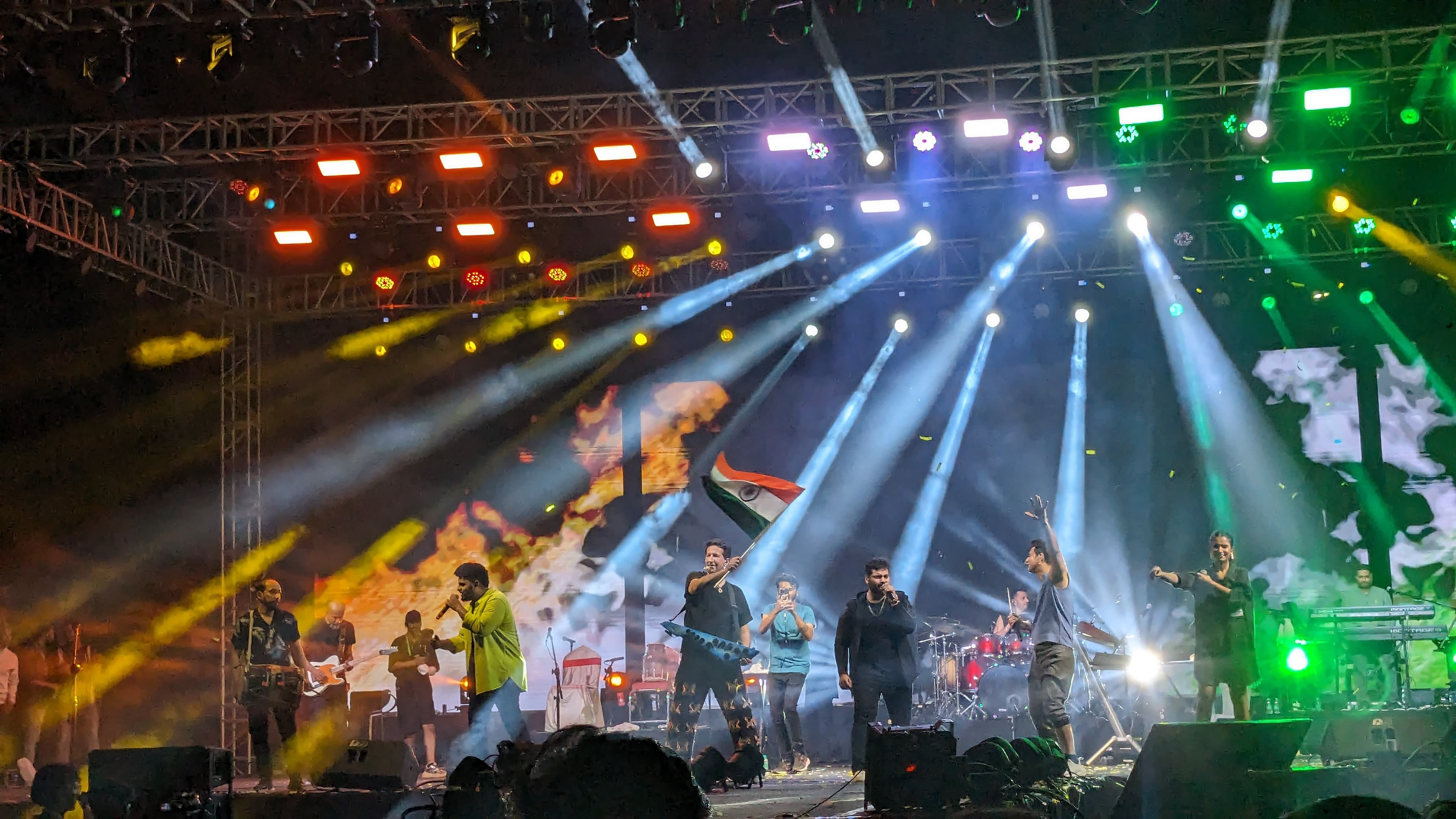
Salim-Sulaiman performing at the Vitopia

=== VTAPP ===
VTAPP, the annual international technical fest of VIT-AP University, organized by the Student Council, the Social Media Committee and the VTAPP Committee. The fest features various competitions and activities like Circuit Maker Competition, Drone Racing, Poster Competition on Corporate Violations of Human Rights, Tech Debates, Tech Talks, and a lot more.
