= R. Margabandhu =

Indian politician

R. Margabandhu is an Indian politician and former Member of the Legislative Assembly of Tamil Nadu. He was elected to the Tamil Nadu legislative assembly as an Anna Dravida Munnetra Kazhagam candidate from Anaicut constituency in 1977 election.

== Electoral performance ==
Election	Constituency	Political party	Result	Vote %	Opposition			Ref
Election	Constituency	Political party	Result	Vote %	Candidate	Political party	Vote %	Ref
1977	Anaikattu	AIADMK	Won	48.78%	P. M. Vasudeva Reddiar	JP	21.08%	
