= Keelvani =

Village in India

Keelvani Moongilpatti
- village
- Country: India
- State: Tamil Nadu
- District: Erode

Languages
  - Official: Tamil
- Time zone: UTC+5:30 (IST)
- PIN: 638502
- Telephone code: 04256
- Vehicle registration: TN 33 36
- Nearest city: Gobichettaipalayam
- Literacy: 85%
- Lok Sabha constituency: Erode

Keelvani is a village lying on the bank of the Bhavani River, between Athani and Appakudal, Erode district, Tamil Nadu.
