= J. L. Eswarappan =

Indian politician

Member of the Tamil Nadu Legislative Assembly
- In office 19 May 2016 – 4 May 2026
- Preceded by: V.K.R. Srinivasan
- Constituency: Arcot

Personal details
- Party: Dravida Munnetra Kazhagam

J. L. Eswarappan is an Indian politician who is a Member of Legislative Assembly of Tamil Nadu. He was elected from Arcot as a Dravida Munnetra Kazhagam candidate in 2016 and 2021. He was elected as Arcot municipality chairman in 2006. He holds the position of the DMK youth Wing district Secretary.

== Electoral performance ==
Election	Constituency	Political party	Result	Vote %	Opposition			Ref
Election	Constituency	Political party	Result	Vote %	Candidate	Political party	Vote %	Ref
2016	Arcot	DMK	Won	41.39%	K. V. Ramadoss	AIADMK	35.94%	
2021	Arcot	DMK	Won	50.06%	K. L. Elavazagan	PMK	40.44%	-
2026	Arcot	DMK	Lost	21.63%	S. M. Sukumar	AIADMK	46.77%	-
