= C. Gopu =

Indian politician

C. Gopu is an Indian politician and former Member of the Legislative Assembly of Tamil Nadu. He was elected to the Tamil Nadu legislative assembly as a Dravida Munnetra Kazhagam candidate from Anaicut constituency in 1996 election.
