= S. P. Kannan =

Indian politician

S. P. Kannan is an Indian politician and former Member of the Legislative Assembly of Tamil Nadu. He was elected to the Tamil Nadu Legislative Assembly as a Dravida Munnetra Kazhagam candidate from Anaicut constituency in the 1989 election.
