= P. N. Subramani =

Indian politician

P. N. Subramani was elected to the Tamil Nadu Legislative Assembly from the Arcot constituency in the 1996 elections. He was a candidate of the Dravida Munnetra Kazhagam party.

== Electoral performance ==
Election	Constituency	Political party	Result	Vote %	Opposition			Ref
Election	Constituency	Political party	Result	Vote %	Candidate	Political party	Vote %	Ref
1996	Arcot	DMK	Won	58.74%	K. V. Ramadoss	AIADMK	34.11%	
