= Ammapalayam, Dharmapuri =

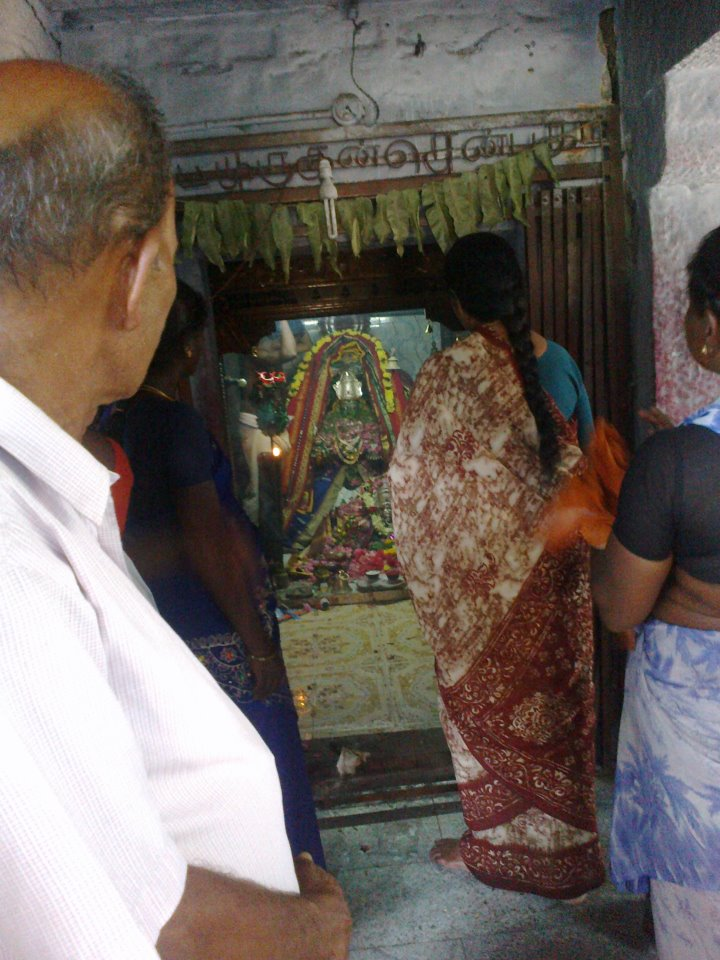
Pachai Amman God

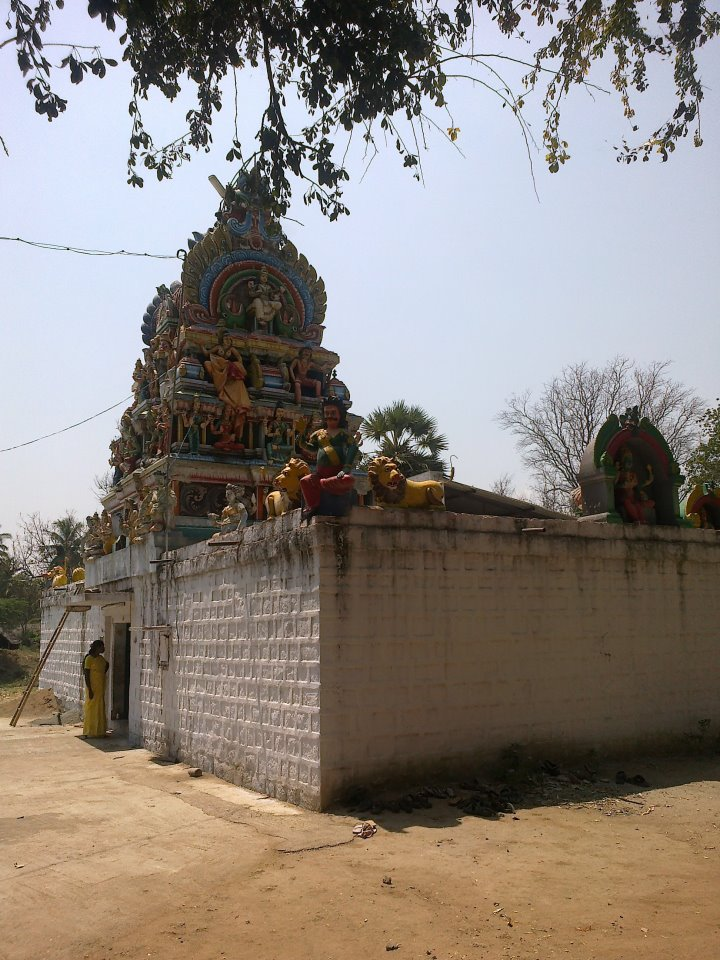
Pachai Amman Temple

Ammapalayam is a small village situated in Dharmapuri district, Tamil Nadu state in southern India. The village has one middle school.

== Commerce ==
Agriculture is the leading source of income for the village. Farmers grow paddy, sugarcane, turmeric, cotton and other grains. Sugarcane is processed locally at the Subramaniya Shiva co-op sugar mill.

== Temples and festivals ==
The village people mostly worship Hindu gods have few temples

- Ayyapan Temple
- Mari Amman Temple
- Murugan Temple
- Pachai Amman Temple

The village celebrate a local festival called Pachai Amman Thiruvila every year at the end of July, Tamil month Aadi 18th.
