= Cuddalore Lok Sabha constituency =

Parliamentary constituency in Tamil Nadu, India

Coordinates: 11.75°N 79.75°E

Cuddalore
- Lok Sabha constituency
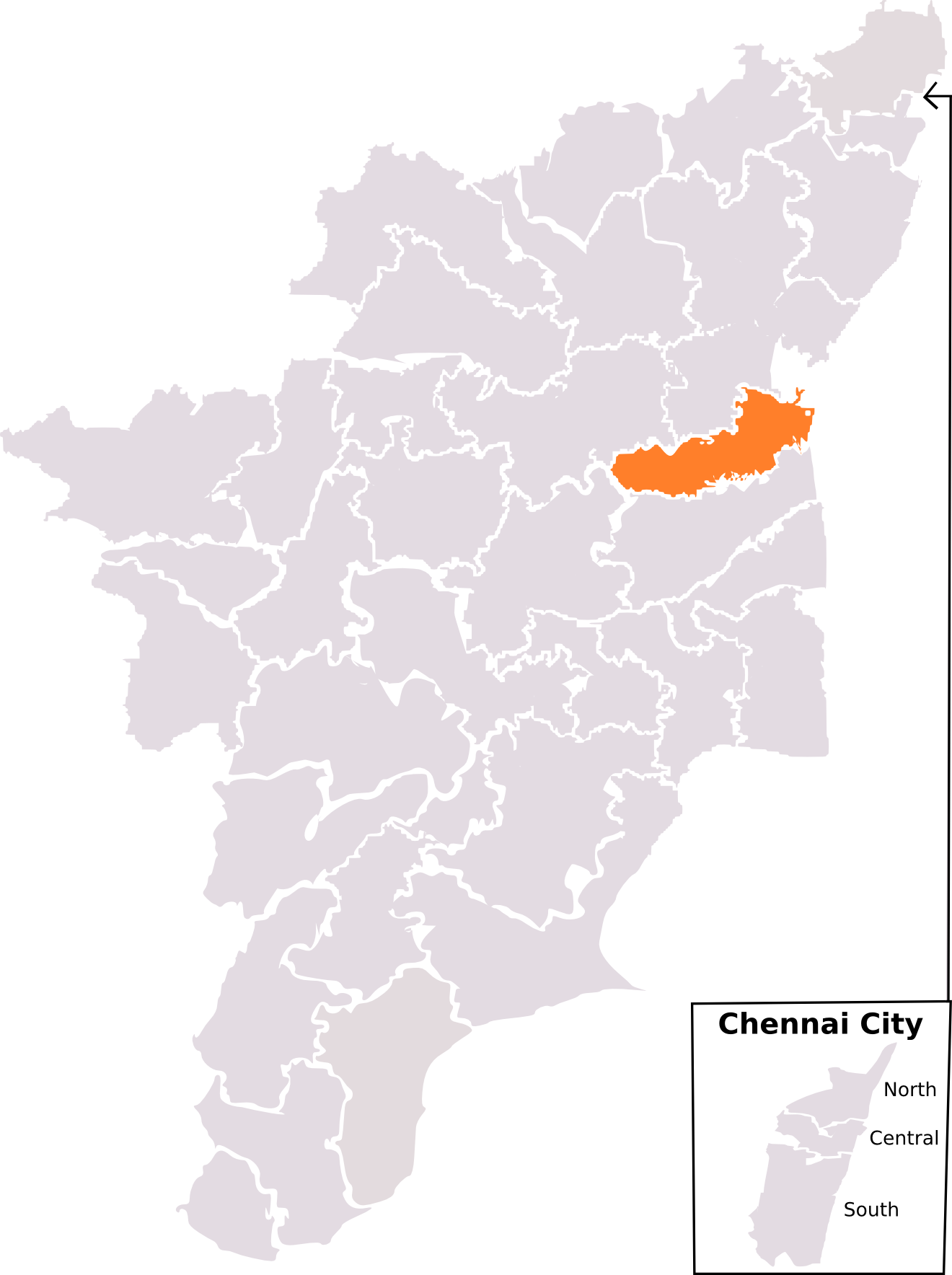
- Cuddalore constituency, post-2008 delimitation

Constituency details
- Country: India
- Region: South India
- State: Tamil Nadu
- Assembly constituencies: Tittakudi; Vriddhachalam; Neyveli; Panruti; Cuddalore; Kurinjipadi
- Established: 1952
- Total electors: 986,030
- Reservation: None

Member of Parliament
- 18th Lok Sabha
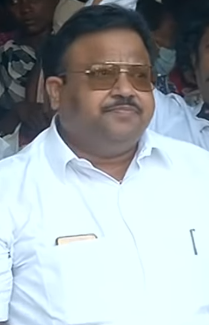
- Incumbent M. K. Vishnu Prasad
- Party: INC
- Alliance: INDIA
- Elected year: 2024

Cuddalore is a Lok Sabha (Parliament of India) constituency in Tamil Nadu. Its Tamil Nadu Parliamentary Constituency number is 26 of 39.

== Assembly segments ==
=== Since 2009 ===
Cuddalore Lok Sabha constituency is composed of the following assembly segments:

Constituency number	Name	Reserved for (SC/ST/None)	District	Party	2024 Lead
151	Tittakudi	SC	Cuddalore	DMK	INC
152	Vriddhachalam	None	Cuddalore	DMDK	INC
153	Neyveli	None	Cuddalore	AIADMK	INC
154	Panruti	None	Cuddalore	AIADMK	INC
155	Cuddalore	None	Cuddalore	TVK	INC
156	Kurinjipadi	None	Cuddalore	DMK	INC

=== Before 2009 ===
Cuddalore Lok Sabha constituency was composed of the following assembly segments:

1. Ulundurpet (SC) (moved to Villupuram)
2. Nellikkuppam (defunct)
3. Cuddalore
4. Panruti
5. Rishivandinam (moved to Kallakurichi)
6. Sankarapuram (moved to Kallakurichi)

== Members of Parliament ==
Year	Winner	Party
1951	N.D.Govindasamy Kachirayar	Tamil Nadu Toilers' Party
1957	T. D. Muthukumarasamy	Independent politician
1962	T. Ramabadran	Dravida Munnetra Kazhagam
1967	V.K. Gounder	Dravida Munnetra Kazhagam
1971	S. Radhakrishnan	Indian National Congress
1977	G. Bhuvarahan	Indian National Congress
1980	R. Muthukumaran	Indian National Congress
1984	P. R. S. Venkatesan	Indian National Congress
1989	P. R. S. Venkatesan	Indian National Congress
1991	P. P. Kaliaperumal	Indian National Congress
1996	P. R. S. Venkatesan	Tamil Maanila Congress
1998	M. C. Dhamodaran	All India Anna Dravida Munnetra Kazhagam
1999	Adhi Sankar	Dravida Munnetra Kazhagam
2004	K. Venkatapathy	Dravida Munnetra Kazhagam
2009	S. Alagiri	Indian National Congress
2014	A. Arunmozhithevan	All India Anna Dravida Munnetra Kazhagam
2019	T.R.V.S. Ramesh	Dravida Munnetra Kazhagam
2024	M. K. Vishnu Prasad	Indian National Congress

== Election results ==
Vote share of Winning candidates
2024	44.11%
2019	50.27%
2014	49.42%
2009	42.81%
2004	52.63%
1999	50.49%
1998	48.84%
1996	56.20%
1991	58.44%
1989	50.58%
1984	61.18%
1980	59.39%
1977	55.75%
1971	54.31%
1967	55.95%
1962	51.38%
1957	42.56%
1951	25.26%

=== General Elections 2024 ===
2024 Indian general election: Cuddalore
Party	Candidate	Votes	%	±%
INC	M. K. Vishnu Prasad	455,053	44.11	
DMDK	P. Sivakozhundu	2,69,157	26.09	
PMK	Thangar Bachan	2,05,244	19.90	
NOTA	None of the above	7,292	0.10	
Margin of victory				−
Turnout				
Registered electors				
INC gain from DMK		Swing		

=== General Elections 2019 ===
2019 Indian general election: Cuddalore
Party	Candidate	Votes	%	±%
DMK	T. R. V. S. Ramesh	522,160	50.27%	21.70%
PMK	Dr. R. Govindasamy	3,78,177	36.41%	
Independent	K. Thangavel	44,892	4.32%	
MNM	V. Annamalai	23,713	2.28%	
NOTA	None of the above	8,725	0.84%	−0.22%
ACDP	Kuppusamy	7,540	0.73%	
Margin of victory		1,43,983	13.86%	−6.99%
Turnout		10,38,741	76.49%	−1.91%
Registered electors		13,64,038		9.31%
DMK gain from AIADMK		Swing	0.85%	

=== General Elections 2014 ===
2014 Indian general election: Cuddalore
Party	Candidate	Votes	%	±%
AIADMK	A. Arunmozhithevan	481,429	49.42%	9.75%
DMK	K. Nandagopalakrishnan	2,78,304	28.57%	
DMDK	C. R. Jayasankar	1,47,606	15.15%	2.71%
INC	K. S. Alagiri	26,650	2.74%	−40.07%
CPI	K. Balasubramanian	11,122	1.14%	
NOTA	None of the above	10,338	1.06%	
Independent	V. Rajkumar	7,678	0.79%	
Independent	P. Jaishankar	6,250	0.64%	
Margin of victory		2,03,125	20.85%	17.71%
Turnout		9,74,200	78.94%	2.15%
Registered electors		12,47,908		26.56%
AIADMK gain from INC		Swing	6.61%	

=== 2009 Indian general election : Cuddalore Lok Sabha constituency ===
2009 Indian general election: Cuddalore
Party	Candidate	Votes	%	±%
INC	K. S. Alagiri	320,473	42.81%	
AIADMK	M. C. Sampath	2,96,941	39.67%	4.32%
DMDK	M. C. Dhamotharan	93,172	12.45%	
Independent	S. Vasanthi	13,400	1.79%	
BSP	C. Arokiyadoss	8,269	1.10%	0.35%
Independent	R. Parthiban	5,492	0.73%	
LJP	A. Kamaraj	5,045	0.67%	
Margin of victory		23,532	3.14%	−14.14%
Turnout		7,48,594	76.04%	12.93%
Registered electors		9,86,030		−18.30%
INC gain from DMK		Swing	-9.82%	

=== General Elections 2004 ===
2004 Indian general election: Cuddalore
Party	Candidate	Votes	%	±%
DMK	K. Venkatapathy	400,059	52.63%	2.13%
AIADMK	R. Rajendran	2,68,707	35.35%	−4.72%
JD(U)	E. Sarwar Khan	53,406	7.03%	
Independent	P. M. Veerapatran	13,664	1.80%	
BSP	M. Santhiyaguraj	5,766	0.76%	
Independent	M. Rajendiran	5,030	0.66%	
Independent	P. Vijaykumar	3,544	0.47%	
Margin of victory		1,31,352	17.28%	6.86%
Turnout		7,60,180	62.99%	−0.77%
Registered electors		12,06,876		6.23%
DMK hold		Swing	2.13%	

=== General Elections 1999 ===
1999 Indian general election: Cuddalore
Party	Candidate	Votes	%	±%
DMK	Adhi Sankar	358,367	50.49%	
AIADMK	M. C. Dhamotharan	2,84,414	40.07%	
TMC(M)	P. R. S. Venkatesan	65,467	9.22%	
Margin of victory		73,953	10.42%	6.15%
Turnout		7,09,744	63.76%	−6.21%
Registered electors		11,36,122		5.56%
DMK gain from AIADMK		Swing	-5.70%	

=== General Elections 1998 ===
1998 Indian general election: Cuddalore
Party	Candidate	Votes	%	±%
AIADMK	M. C. Dhamotharan	309,985	48.84%	
TMC(M)	P. R. S. Venkatesan	2,82,856	44.56%	
INC	Dr. R. Eramadass	40,603	6.40%	
Margin of victory		27,129	4.27%	−25.32%
Turnout		6,34,744	61.17%	−8.80%
Registered electors		10,76,266		3.24%
AIADMK gain from TMC(M)		Swing	-7.36%	

=== General Elections 1996 ===
1996 Indian general election: Cuddalore
Party	Candidate	Votes	%	±%
TMC(M)	P. R. S. Venkatesan	389,660	56.20%	
INC	V. Santhamurthy	1,84,456	26.60%	−31.84%
MDMK	R. T. Sabapathy Mohan	55,110	7.95%	
AIIC(T)	P. P. Kalia Perumal	41,284	5.95%	
BJP	N. Apparsamy	7,845	1.13%	−0.53%
Independent	M. Kirubapuri	3,975	0.57%	
Margin of victory		2,05,204	29.59%	−4.14%
Turnout		6,93,384	69.97%	1.69%
Registered electors		10,42,486		9.33%
TMC(M) gain from INC		Swing	-2.24%	

=== General Elections 1991 ===
1991 Indian general election: Cuddalore
Party	Candidate	Votes	%	±%
INC	P. P. Kalia Perumal	360,445	58.44%	7.87%
JD	G. Bhuvaraghan	1,52,388	24.71%	
PMK	G. Chinnadhuri	82,416	13.36%	
BJP	V. Kothandapani	10,234	1.66%	
THMM	B. Liyakath Ali	2,827	0.46%	
Margin of victory		2,08,057	33.73%	15.92%
Turnout		6,16,760	68.28%	−1.22%
Registered electors		9,53,560		−0.57%
INC hold		Swing	7.87%	

=== General Elections 1989 ===
1989 Indian general election: Cuddalore
Party	Candidate	Votes	%	±%
INC	P. R. S. Venkatesan	331,617	50.58%	−10.61%
DMK	G. Bhaskaran	2,14,782	32.76%	−3.77%
PMK	V. R. Dhandapani	99,814	15.22%	
THMM	S. Perumal	3,394	0.52%	
Independent	K. Dharuman	2,985	0.46%	
Margin of victory		1,16,835	17.82%	−6.84%
Turnout		6,55,682	69.49%	−7.71%
Registered electors		9,59,014		30.83%
INC hold		Swing	-10.61%	

=== General Elections 1984 ===
1984 Indian general election: Cuddalore
Party	Candidate	Votes	%	±%
INC	P. R. S. Venkatesan	327,393	61.18%	
DMK	Ramu T Alias Killivalavan	1,95,439	36.52%	
Independent	R. V. Seetharaman	9,545	1.78%	
Independent	T. Abdul Wahab	2,728	0.51%	
Margin of victory		1,31,954	24.66%	0.10%
Turnout		5,35,105	77.20%	11.62%
Registered electors		7,33,050		5.84%
INC gain from INC(I)		Swing	1.79%	

=== General Elections 1980 ===
1980 Indian general election: Cuddalore
Party	Candidate	Votes	%	±%
INC(I)	R. Muthukumaran	262,694	59.39%	
AIADMK	Arvinda Bala Pajanor	1,54,043	34.83%	
Independent	Rajalakshmi Selvi	6,359	1.44%	
Independent	T. Kanagarathinam	5,786	1.31%	
JP(S)	L. Ramamurthy	4,959	1.12%	
Independent	T. R. Narasimhan	3,524	0.80%	
Independent	A. Ramalingam	2,970	0.67%	
Independent	T. Abdul Wahab	1,984	0.45%	
Margin of victory		1,08,651	24.56%	3.08%
Turnout		4,42,319	65.59%	−1.08%
Registered electors		6,92,583		7.40%
INC(I) gain from INC		Swing	3.64%	

=== General Elections 1977 ===
1977 Indian general election: Cuddalore
Party	Candidate	Votes	%	±%
INC	G. Bhuvarahan	231,128	55.75%	1.44%
INC(O)	S. Radhakrishnan	1,42,071	34.27%	
Independent	S. Kanagarathinam	26,862	6.48%	
Independent	T. Meyalagan	10,989	2.65%	
Independent	T. Vahab	3,511	0.85%	
Margin of victory		89,057	21.48%	12.86%
Turnout		4,14,561	66.66%	−8.18%
Registered electors		6,44,882		9.03%
INC hold		Swing	1.44%	

=== General Elections 1971 ===
1971 Indian general election: Cuddalore
Party	Candidate	Votes	%	±%
INC	S. Radhakrishnan	229,934	54.31%	10.26%
INC(O)	R. Muthukumaran	1,93,447	45.69%	
Margin of victory		36,487	8.62%	−3.28%
Turnout		4,23,381	74.85%	−1.55%
Registered electors		5,91,447		8.51%
INC gain from DMK		Swing	-1.64%	

=== General Elections 1967 ===
1967 Indian general election: Cuddalore
Party	Candidate	Votes	%	±%
DMK	V. K. Gounder	225,571	55.95%	4.57%
INC	S. Radhakrishnan	1,77,598	44.05%	3.97%
Margin of victory		47,973	11.90%	0.59%
Turnout		4,03,169	76.40%	8.60%
Registered electors		5,45,062		13.78%
DMK hold		Swing	4.57%	

=== General Elections 1962 ===
1962 Indian general election: Cuddalore
Party	Candidate	Votes	%	±%
DMK	T. Ramabadra Naidu	160,811	51.38%	
INC	T. D. Muthukumaraswami Naidu	1,25,424	40.08%	−2.46%
Independent	R. Thillai Govindan	19,752	6.31%	
Independent	A. Shariff	6,981	2.23%	
Margin of victory		35,387	11.31%	11.28%
Turnout		3,12,968	67.80%	14.13%
Registered electors		4,79,031		10.97%
DMK gain from Independent		Swing	8.83%	

=== General Elections 1957 ===
1957 Indian general election: Cuddalore
Party	Candidate	Votes	%	±%
Independent	T. D. Muthukumaraswami Naidu	98,605	42.56%	
INC	S. Radhakrishnan	98,546	42.53%	20.24%
Independent	N. D. Govindaswamy Kachirayar	34,549	14.91%	
Margin of victory		59	0.03%	−2.94%
Turnout		2,31,700	53.68%	−45.58%
Registered electors		4,31,659		−42.10%
Independent gain from TTP		Swing	17.30%	

=== General Elections 1951 ===
1951–52 Indian general election: Cuddalore
Party	Candidate	Votes	%	±%
TTP	Govindaswamy Kachirayar	186,894	25.26%	
INC	Kanakasabai	1,64,985	22.30%	22.30%
INC	L. Elayaperumal	1,56,488	21.15%	21.15%
TTP	N. Rajangan	1,44,625	19.54%	
Independent	D. Narayana Ayyar	46,384	6.27%	
Independent	Smapath Ayyangar	40,595	5.49%	
Margin of victory		21,909	2.96%	
Turnout		7,39,971	99.26%	
Registered electors		7,45,514		0.00%
TTP win (new seat)				

== See also ==
- Cuddalore
- List of constituencies of the Lok Sabha
