= List of political parties in Tamil Nadu =

Tamil Nadu has a multi-party system. The Election Commission of India accords recognition to national-level and state-level political parties based upon objective criteria. A recognised political party enjoys privileges like a reserved party symbol, (Note: If a party is recognized as a national or state party, its symbol is reserved for its exclusive use in the country or in the state.) free broadcast time on state-run television and radio, consultation in the setting of election dates, and giving input in setting electoral rules and regulations. Other political parties that want to run in local, state, or national elections must register with the Election Commission of India. The Election Commission of India recognises registered parties as recognised state parties if they meet the relevant criteria following a Lok Sabha or Tamil Nadu Legislative Assembly election. The recognised-party status is reviewed periodically by the Election Commission of India.

Prior to the 2016 amendment, which went into effect on 1 January 2014, if a political party failed to meet the criteria in the subsequent Lok Sabha or Tamil Nadu Legislative Assembly election, they lost their status as a recognised party. In 2016, the Election Commission of India announced that such a review would take place after two consecutive elections instead of every election. As a result, a political party must retain its recognised party status even if it fails to meet the criteria in the next election. However, if they fail to meet the criteria in the subsequent election following the next election, they would lose their status.

== National parties ==
| Political party | | Flag | Electoral symbol | Founded | Founder | TN unit leader | Seats | | |
| Political party | | Flag | Electoral symbol | Founded | Founder | TN unit leader | Lok Sabha | Rajya Sabha | Tamil Nadu Legislative Assembly |
|---|---|---|---|---|---|---|---|---|---|
| Aam Aadmi Party | AAP | | | 26 November 2012 | Arvind Kejriwal | S. A. N. Vasigaran | 0 / 39 | 0 / 18 | 0 / 234 |
| Bahujan Samaj Party | BSP | | | 14 April 1984 | Kanshi Ram | P. Anandan | 0 / 39 | 0 / 18 | 0 / 234 |
| Bharatiya Janata Party | BJP | | | 6 April 1980 | Atal Bihari Vajpayee | Nainar Nagenthran | 0 / 39 | 0 / 18 | 1 / 234 |
| Communist Party of India (Marxist) | CPI(M) | | | 7 November 1964 | E. M. S. Namboodiripad | P. Shanmugam | 2 / 39 | 0 / 18 | 2 / 234 |
| Indian National Congress | INC | | | 28 December 1885 | Allan Octavian Hume | B. Manickam Tagore | 9 / 39 | 3 / 18 | 5 / 234 |
| National People's Party | NPP | | | 6 January 2013 | P. A. Sangma | G. Srinivasan | 0 / 39 | 0 / 18 | 0 / 234 |

== State parties ==
| Political party | | Flag | Electoral symbol | Founded | Founder | Leader | Seats | | |
| Political party | | Flag | Electoral symbol | Founded | Founder | Leader | Lok Sabha | Rajya Sabha | Tamil Nadu Legislative Assembly |
|---|---|---|---|---|---|---|---|---|---|
| All India Anna Dravida Munnetra Kazhagam | AIADMK | | | 17 October 1972 | M. G. Ramachandran | Edappadi K. Palaniswami | 0 / 39 | 4 / 18 | 41 / 234 |
| Communist Party of India | CPI | | | 26 December 1925 | M. N. Roy | M. Veerapandian | 2 / 39 | 0 / 18 | 2 / 234 |
| Desiya Murpokku Dravida Kazhagam | DMDK | | | 14 September 2005 | Vijayakant | Premallatha Vijayakant | 0 / 39 | 1 / 18 | 1 / 234 |
| Dravida Munnetra Kazhagam | DMK | | | 17 September 1949 | C. N. Annadurai | M. K. Stalin | 22 / 39 | 8 / 18 | 59 / 234 |
| Naam Tamilar Katchi | NTK | | | 1958 | S. P. Adithanar | Seeman | 0 / 39 | 0 / 18 | 0 / 234 |
| Tamilaga Vettri Kazhagam | TVK | | | 2 February 2024 | C. Joseph Vijay | C. Joseph Vijay | 0 / 39 | 0 / 18 | 109 / 234 |
| Viduthalai Chiruthaigal Katchi | VCK | | | 1982 | M. Malalchami; D. Amukurajah | Thol. Thirumavalavan | 2 / 39 | 0 / 18 | 2 / 234 |

== Unrecognized parties ==
| Political party | | Flag | Founded | Founder | Leader | Seats | | |
| Political party | | Flag | Founded | Founder | Leader | Lok Sabha | Rajya Sabha | Tamil Nadu Legislative Assembly |
|---|---|---|---|---|---|---|---|---|
| All India Forward Bloc | AIFB | | 22 June 1939 | Subhas Chandra Bose | P. V. Kathiravan | 0 / 39 | 0 / 18 | 0 / 234 |
| Amma Makkal Munnettra Kazagam | AMMK | | 15 March 2018 | T. T. V. Dhinakaran | T. T. V. Dhinakaran | 0 / 39 | 0 / 18 | 0 / 234 |
| Indhiya Jananayaga Katchi | IJK | | 28 April 2010 | T. R. Paarivendhar | T. R. Paarivendhar | 0 / 39 | 0 / 18 | 0 / 234 |
| Indian National League | INL | | 23 April 1994 | Ebrahim Sulaiman Sait | M. Muniruddin Sharif | 0 / 39 | 0 / 18 | 0 / 234 |
| Indian Union Muslim League | IUML | | 1 September 1951 | Muhammad Ismail Sahib | K. M. Kader Mohideen | 1 / 39 | 0 / 18 | 2 / 234 |
| Makkal Needhi Maiam | MNM | | 21 February 2018 | Kamal Haasan | Kamal Haasan | 0 / 39 | 1 / 18 | 0 / 234 |
| Manithaneya Jananayaga Katchi | MJK | | 28 February 2016 | M. Thamimun Ansari | M. Thamimun Ansari | 0 / 39 | 0 / 18 | 0 / 234 |
| Marumalarchi Dravida Munnetra Kazhagam | MDMK | | 6 May 1994 | Vaiko | Vaiko | 1 / 39 | 0 / 18 | 0 / 234 |
| Pattali Makkal Katchi | PMK | | 16 July 1989 | S. Ramadoss | Anbumani Ramadoss | 0 / 39 | 1 / 18 | 4 / 234 |
| Puratchi Bharatham Katchi | PBK | | 26 January 1978 | Poovai M. Moorthy | M. Jagan Moorthy | 0 / 39 | 0 / 18 | 0 / 234 |
| Puthiya Tamilagam | PT | | 15 December 1997 | K. Krishnasamy | K. Krishnasamy | 0 / 39 | 0 / 18 | 0 / 234 |
| Social Democratic Party of India | SDPI | | 21 June 2009 | Erappungal Abubacker | V. M. S. Mohamed Mubarak | 0 / 39 | 0 / 18 | 0 / 234 |
| Tamil Maanila Bahujan Samaj Party | TMBSP | | 5 July 2025 | Porkodi Armstrong | Porkodi Armstrong | 0 / 39 | 0 / 18 | 0 / 234 |
| Tamil Maanila Congress (Moopanar) | TMC(M) | | 29 March 1996 | G. K. Moopanar | G. K. Vasan | 0 / 39 | 0 / 18 | 0 / 234 |

== See also ==
- Elections in India
- Elections in Tamil Nadu
- List of political parties in India
