= R. Govindasamy =

Indian politician

R. Govindasamy was elected to the Tamil Nadu Legislative Assembly from the Virudhachalam constituency in the 2001 elections. He was a candidate of the Pattali Makkal Katchi (PMK) party.

== Electoral history ==
=== General Elections 2019 ===
2019 Indian general election: Cuddalore
Party	Candidate	Votes	%	±%
DMK	T. R. V. S. Ramesh	522,160	50.27%	21.70%
PMK	R. Govindasamy	378,177	36.41%	
Independent	K. Thangavel	44,892	4.32%	
NTK	R. Chithra	34,692	3.34%	
MNM	V. Annamalai	23,713	2.28%	
NOTA	None of the above	8,725	0.84%	−0.22%
ACDP	Kuppusamy	7,540	0.73%	
Margin of victory		1,43,983	13.86%	−6.99%
Turnout		10,38,741	76.49%	−1.91%
Registered electors		13,64,038		9.31%
DMK gain from AIADMK		Swing	0.85%	

=== State Assembly Result ===
2006 Tamil Nadu Legislative Assembly election: Vriddhachalam
Party	Candidate	Votes	%	±%
DMDK	A. Vijayakanth	61,337	40.42%	New
PMK	R. Govindasamy	47,560	31.34%	−18.79
AIADMK	R. Kasinathan	35,876	23.64%	New
BJP	V. Aravind	1,265	0.83%	New
Independent	C. Vijayakanth	1,174	0.77%	New
SP	K. Mangapillai	878	0.58%	New
Independent	K. Vijayakanth	832	0.55%	New
Margin of victory		13,777	9.08%	3.89%
Turnout		151,731	76.98%	9.09%
Registered electors		197,117		
DMDK gain from PMK		Swing	-9.71%	

2001 Tamil Nadu Legislative Assembly election: Vriddhachalam
Party	Candidate	Votes	%	±%
PMK	Dr. R. Govindasamy	68,905	50.13%	+17.96
DMK	Kuzhandai Tamizharasan	61,777	44.95%	+7.53
MDMK	G. Vengadasalabthi	1,657	1.21%	−2.87
Independent	G. Jayabalan	1,650	1.20%	New
BSP	Pon. Nagappan	1,230	0.89%	New
Independent	T. Senthilkumar	1,011	0.74%	New
Margin of victory		7,128	5.19%	−0.06%
Turnout		137,440	67.88%	−5.59%
Registered electors		202,466		
PMK gain from DMK		Swing	12.71%	

1996 Tamil Nadu Legislative Assembly election: Vriddhachalam
Party	Candidate	Votes	%	±%
DMK	Kuzhandai Tamizharasan	49,103	37.42%	+16.75
PMK	R. Govindasamy	42,218	32.18%	New
AIADMK	C. Ramanathan	30,166	22.99%	−22.06
MDMK	M. M. Srinivasan	5,349	4.08%	New
Independent	A. Rajendran	2,202	1.68%	New
Margin of victory		6,885	5.25%	−7.16%
Turnout		131,213	73.47%	0.31%
Registered electors		185,683		
DMK gain from AIADMK		Swing	-7.63%	
