= Cuddalore Assembly constituency =

One of the 234 State Legislative Assembly Constituencies in Tamil Nadu, in India

Coordinates: 11.75°N 79.75°E

Cuddalore
- Constituency No. 155 for the Tamil Nadu Legislative Assembly

Constituency details
- Country: India
- Region: South India
- State: Tamil Nadu
- District: Cuddalore
- Lok Sabha constituency: Cuddalore
- Established: 1951
- Total electors: 223,243
- Reservation: None

Member of Legislative Assembly
- 17th Tamil Nadu Legislative Assembly
- Incumbent B.Rajkumar
- Party: TVK
- Elected year: 2026

Cuddalore is a legislative assembly constituency, that includes the city of Cuddalore. Cuddalore Assembly constituency is a part of Cuddalore Lok Sabha constituency. Cuddalore was one of 17 assembly constituencies to have VVPAT facility with EVMs in the 2016 Tamil Nadu Legislative Assembly election. It is one of the 234 State Legislative Assembly Constituencies in Tamil Nadu in India.

== Members of Legislative Assembly ==
=== Madras State ===
Assembly	Elected year	Duration	Winner	Party
First	1952	1952-1957	Rathinam	Tamil Nadu Toilers' Party
Second	1957	1957-1962	P. R. Seenivasa Padayachi	Indian National Congress
Third	1962	1962-1967	P. R. Seenivasa Padayachi	Indian National Congress
Fourth	1967	1967-1971	Ere. Elamvazhuthi	Dravida Munnetra Kazhagam

=== Tamil Nadu ===
Assembly	Duration	Winner	Party
Fifth	1971-1977	R. Govindaraj	Dravida Munnetra Kazhagam
Sixth	1977-1980	K. Abdul Latheef	All India Anna Dravida Munnetra Kazhagam
Seventh	1980-1984	Babu Govindarajan	Dravida Munnetra Kazhagam
Eighth	1984-1989	V. G. Cheelappa	Indian National Congress
Ninth	1989-1991	E. Pugazhendi	Dravida Munnetra Kazhagam
Tenth	1991-1996	P. R. S. Venkatesan	Indian National Congress
Eleventh	1996-2001	E. Pugazhendi	Dravida Munnetra Kazhagam
Twelfth	2001-2006	E. Pugazhendi	Dravida Munnetra Kazhagam
Thirteenth	2006-2011	G. Iyappan	Dravida Munnetra Kazhagam
Fourteenth	2011-2016	M. C. Sampath	All India Anna Dravida Munnetra Kazhagam
Fifteenth	2016-2021	M. C. Sampath	All India Anna Dravida Munnetra Kazhagam
Sixteenth	2021-2026	G. Iyappan	Dravida Munnetra Kazhagam
Seventeenth	2026	B. Rajkumar	Tamilaga Vettri Kazhagam

== Election results ==
Vote share of winning candidates
2026	37.22%
2021	46.46%
2016	41.07%
2011	60.56%
2006	47.76%
2001	45.61%
1991	48.60%
1989	42.91%
1984	58.02%
1980	49.05%
1977	31.61%
1971	52.60%
1967	55.09%
1962	40.72%
1957	41.18%
1952	34.12%

=== 2026 ===
2026 Tamil Nadu Legislative Assembly election: Cuddalore
Party	Candidate	Votes	%	±%
TVK	B. Rajkumar	70,856	37.22	New
INC	A.S.Chandarasekaran	55,337	29.07	New
AIADMK	M.C.Sampath	55,258	29.03	▼14.60
NTK	S.Sarasu	5,766	3.03	▼2.22
NOTA	NOTA	894	0.47	▼0.21
Margin of victory		15,519	8.15	▲5.32
Turnout		1,90,378	85.28	▲8.93
Registered electors		2,23,243		▼15,121
TVK gain from DMK		Swing	▲37.22	

=== 2021 ===
2021 Tamil Nadu Legislative Assembly election: Cuddalore
Party	Candidate	Votes	%	±%
DMK	G. Iyappan	84,563	46.46%	+19.53
AIADMK	M. C. Sampath	79,412	43.63%	+2.56
NTK	V. Jaladeepan	9,563	5.25%	−1.98
MNM	K. Anandraj	4,040	2.22%	New
DMDK	A. Gnanapandithan	1,499	0.82%	New
NOTA	NOTA	1,236	0.68%	−0.51
Margin of victory		5,151	2.83%	−11.31%
Turnout		182,001	76.35%	1.66%
Rejected ballots		391	0.21%	
Registered electors		238,364		
DMK gain from AIADMK		Swing	5.39%	

=== 2016 ===
2016 Tamil Nadu Legislative Assembly election: Cuddalore
Party	Candidate	Votes	%	±%
AIADMK	M. C. Sampath	70,922	41.07	−19.49
DMK	Ela. Pugazhendi	46,509	26.93%	−9.9
TMC(M)	A. S. Chandarasekaran	20,608	11.93%	New
PMK	Pazha. Thamaraikannan	16,905	9.79%	New
NTK	Seeman	12,497	7.24%	New
NOTA	NOTA	2,062	1.19%	New
BJP	P. Selvam	1,964	1.14%	+0.02
Margin of victory		24,413	14.14%	−9.59%
Turnout		172,688	74.69%	−3.33%
Registered electors		231,205		
AIADMK hold		Swing	-19.49%	

=== 2011 ===
2011 Tamil Nadu Legislative Assembly election: Cuddalore
Party	Candidate	Votes	%	±%
AIADMK	M. C. Sampath	85,953	60.56%	+17.27
DMK	E. Pugazhendi	52,275	36.83%	−10.93
BJP	R. Gunasekaran	1,579	1.11%	−0.17
Independent	S. V. Rajan	892	0.63%	New
Loktantrik Samajwadi	T. E. Chithrakala	774	0.55%	New
Margin of victory		33,678	23.73%	19.26%
Turnout		141,930	78.02%	6.48%
Registered electors		181,920		
AIADMK gain from DMK		Swing	12.80%	

=== 2006 ===
2006 Tamil Nadu Legislative Assembly election: Cuddalore
Party	Candidate	Votes	%	±%
DMK	G. Iyappan	67,003	47.76%	+2.15
AIADMK	G. Kumar	60,737	43.30%	New
DMDK	G. V. Jayakumar	7,866	5.61%	New
BJP	P. Sivakumar	1,803	1.29%	New
Independent	S. Sriramulu	797	0.57%	New
Independent	J. Srivathsan	776	0.55%	New
Margin of victory		6,266	4.47%	4.44%
Turnout		140,286	71.54%	14.95%
Registered electors		196,095		
DMK hold		Swing	2.15%	

=== 2001 ===
2001 Tamil Nadu Legislative Assembly election: Cuddalore
Party	Candidate	Votes	%	±%
DMK	E. Pugazhendi	54,671	45.61%	−16.66
TMC(M)	P. R. S. Venkatesan	54,637	45.58%	New
MDMK	S. Pathmanaban	7,119	5.94%	+0.15
Independent	S. Sriramulu	1,284	1.07%	New
Puratchi Bharatham	S. Muruganantham	929	0.78%	New
Independent	D. Senthilkumar	685	0.57%	New
Margin of victory		34	0.03%	−40.63%
Turnout		119,862	56.59%	−10.51%
Registered electors		212,016		
DMK hold		Swing	-16.66%	

=== 1996 ===
1996 Tamil Nadu Legislative Assembly election: Cuddalore
Party	Candidate	Votes	%	±%
DMK	E. Pugazhendi	74,480	62.27%	+28
INC	K. V. Rajendiran	25,853	21.62%	−26.99
AIIC(T)	N. Varatharajan	9,552	7.99%	New
MDMK	S. Padmanaban	6,925	5.79%	New
BJP	S. Varatharajan	848	0.71%	−0.4
Margin of victory		48,627	40.66%	26.32%
Turnout		119,606	67.11%	3.76%
Registered electors		185,364		
DMK gain from INC		Swing	13.67%	

=== 1991 ===
1991 Tamil Nadu Legislative Assembly election: Cuddalore
Party	Candidate	Votes	%	±%
INC	P. R. S. Venkatesan	51,459	48.60%	+26.14
DMK	E. Pugazhendi	36,284	34.27%	−8.64
PMK	K. Abdul Lateef	15,940	15.06%	New
BJP	K. Chokkalilnga Achari	1,171	1.11%	New
Margin of victory		15,175	14.33%	−6.10%
Turnout		105,873	63.34%	−4.59%
Registered electors		172,538		
INC gain from DMK		Swing	5.70%	

=== 1989 ===
1989 Tamil Nadu Legislative Assembly election: Cuddalore
Party	Candidate	Votes	%	±%
DMK	E. Pugazhendi	42,790	42.91%	+2.91
INC	M. Radhakrishnan	22,408	22.47%	−35.55
AIADMK	K. Abdul Latheef	18,721	18.77%	New
AIADMK	D. Janarthanan	7,028	7.05%	New
Independent	S. O. Padmanabhan	6,694	6.71%	New
Independent	M. P. Rajamanickam	906	0.91%	New
Margin of victory		20,382	20.44%	2.42%
Turnout		99,729	67.93%	−5.95%
Registered electors		149,592		
DMK gain from INC		Swing	-15.11%	

=== 1984 ===
1984 Tamil Nadu Legislative Assembly election: Cuddalore
Party	Candidate	Votes	%	±%
INC	V. G. Cheelappa	53,759	58.02%	New
DMK	V. Krishnamurthy	37,063	40.00%	−9.05
Independent	Nakkeeran Alais Jayaraman	776	0.84%	New
Independent	Jayabalan P	621	0.67%	New
Margin of victory		16,696	18.02%	14.22%
Turnout		92,663	73.88%	11.12%
Registered electors		129,630		
INC gain from DMK		Swing	8.96%	

=== 1980 ===
1980 Tamil Nadu Legislative Assembly election: Cuddalore
Party	Candidate	Votes	%	±%
DMK	Babu Govindarajan	40,539	49.05%	+19.84
AIADMK	A. Ragupathi	37,398	45.25%	+13.64
JP	V. Balakrishna Sethupathy Padayachi	4,077	4.93%	New
Margin of victory		3,141	3.80%	1.41%
Turnout		82,646	62.76%	1.48%
Registered electors		133,227		
DMK gain from AIADMK		Swing	17.44%	

=== 1977 ===
1977 Tamil Nadu Legislative Assembly election: Cuddalore
Party	Candidate	Votes	%	±%
AIADMK	K. M. Abdul Latheef	24,107	31.61%	New
DMK	R. Govindarajan	22,280	29.21%	−23.39
JP	P. R. S. Venkatesan	20,106	26.36%	New
INC	M. Venkatesan	8,387	11.00%	−35.17
Independent	T. R. Narasimhan	863	1.13%	New
Independent	N. Natarajan	526	0.69%	New
Margin of victory		1,827	2.40%	−4.04%
Turnout		76,269	61.28%	−12.28%
Registered electors		126,391		
AIADMK gain from DMK		Swing	-21.00%	

=== 1971 ===
1971 Tamil Nadu Legislative Assembly election: Cuddalore
Party	Candidate	Votes	%	±%
DMK	R. Govindaraj	35,219	52.60%	−2.48
INC	P. R. Seenivasa Padayachi	30,909	46.17%	+2.46
Independent	T. Kuppusamy	822	1.23%	New
Margin of victory		4,310	6.44%	−4.94%
Turnout		66,950	73.56%	−2.02%
Registered electors		96,497		
DMK hold		Swing	-2.48%	

=== 1967 ===
1967 Madras Legislative Assembly election: Cuddalore
Party	Candidate	Votes	%	±%
DMK	Ere. Elamvazhuthi	35,093	55.09%	+23.85
INC	P. R. Seenivasa Padayachi	27,845	43.71%	+2.99
Independent	A. Padayachi	767	1.20%	New
Margin of victory		7,248	11.38%	1.89%
Turnout		63,705	75.58%	3.97%
Registered electors		87,210		
DMK gain from INC		Swing	14.37%	

=== 1962 ===
1962 Madras Legislative Assembly election: Cuddalore
Party	Candidate	Votes	%	±%
INC	P. R. Seenivasa Padayachi	27,567	40.72%	−0.46
DMK	R. Sambasiva Reddiar	21,147	31.24%	New
SWA	S. S. Ramsami Padayachi	18,983	28.04%	New
Margin of victory		6,420	9.48%	1.57%
Turnout		67,697	71.61%	16.50%
Registered electors		99,494		
INC hold		Swing	-0.46%	

=== 1957 ===
1957 Madras Legislative Assembly election: Cuddalore
Party	Candidate	Votes	%	±%
INC	P. R. Seenivasa Padayachi	21,100	41.18%	+22.94
Independent	Sambandan	17,044	33.27%	New
Independent	R. Dandapani	13,091	25.55%	New
Margin of victory		4,056	7.92%	3.90%
Turnout		51,235	55.11%	−53.52%
Registered electors		92,967		
INC gain from TTP		Swing	7.07%	

=== 1952 ===
1952 Madras Legislative Assembly election: Cuddalore
Party	Candidate	Votes	%	±%
TTP	Rathinam	64,446	34.12%	New
INC	P. R. Seenivasa Padayachi	34,466	18.25%	New
Margin of victory		7,580	4.01%	
Turnout		188,903	108.64%	
Registered electors		173,887		
TTP win (new seat)				
