= St Joseph's Higher Secondary School, Cuddalore =

St. Joseph's Higher Secondary School
- "Karnal Thottam"

Location
- Manjakuppam Road; Cuddalore, 607001; India

Information
- Type: Public
- Motto: Labor omnia vincit
- Established: 1868
- School board: Tamil Nadu Board of Secondary Education
- Principal: P. Arul Nathan (2015- )
- Enrollment: 10000 (approx)
- Campus: Urban
- Colours: White Sandal and Brown
- Nickname: Karnal Thottam
- Website: stjosephscud.com

St Joseph's Higher Secondary School is one of the schools of India located in Tamil Nadu.

St Joseph's High School which was started in 1868. This school was elevated into a college in 1884 through the efforts of Father Tarbes and was affiliated to the University of Madras. The District - Gazetteer, Cuddalore District has recorded that the prime educational institution and the only college in the District in the 19th century was the St Joseph's College. It once again became a High School in 1909 due to the financial constraints.

Since then there have been several attempts to revitalize the college. The college was reborn as the St Joseph's College of Arts and Science in 1991. The college was inaugurated on 11 October 1991, at a stately function presided over by Bhishma Narain Singh, the then Governor of Tamil Nadu.

The School bears the Motto Labor omnia vincit, meaning "Hard work conquers all".

== History ==
- 1852 The site "Colonel Garden" acquired by Mgr. Bonand, D.D. Vicar Apostolic of Pondy.
- 1868 Inauguration of St. Joseph's High School through the effort of Rev Father L Renevier, the First Principal.
- 1884 St Joseph's raised to the status of a Second Grade College with Humanities and Mathematics.
- 1909 Downgraded to the status of High School.
- 1957 St Joseph's Industrial School inaugurated.
- 1962 St Joseph's Hostel inaugurated.
- 1968 Completion of a century.
- 1969 Centenary celebrations
- 1979 Upgraded into a Higher Secondary School.
- 1982 St Joseph's Nursery School started.
- 1984 Sports Authority of India adopts the School for promotion of sports activities.
- 1988 Industrial School becomes Industrial Training Institute(I.T.I).
- 1991 St Joseph's College of Arts and Science inaugurated by Bhisma Narain Singh, Governor of Tamil Nadu.
- 1993 Completion of one Hundred and Twenty Five years.
- 1994 Post-Centennial Silver Jubilee Celebrations.

== Principals ==
- Rev. Fr. L. Reneuvier 1868–1872
- Rev. Fr. Seegmuller 1872–1873
- Rev. Fr. Bottero 1873–1875
- Rev. Fr. Tarbes 1875–1888
- Rev. Fr. J. M. Bertho 1888–1895
- Rev. Fr. Durier 1895–1898
- Rev. Fr. J. M. Bertho 1898–1906
- Rev. Fr. P. Verdure 1906–1934
- Rev. Fr. Mirande 1934–1936
- Rev. Fr. P.A. Swamikannu Interim
- Rev. Fr. H. Escande 1937–1941
- Rev. Fr. H. Cailleauit 1942
- Rev. Fr. A.M. Gnanapragasam 1942–1961
- Rev. Fr. M. Peter 1961–1981
- Rev. Fr. R. Ratchagar 1981–1997
- Rev. Fr. G. Peter Rajendiran 1997–2002
- Rev. Fr. V. Aruldass 2002–2007
- Rev. Fr. V. Agnel 2007 -2013
- Rev. Fr. G. Peter Rajendiram 2013–2015
- Rev. Fr. P. Arul Nathan 2015-till date

== Amenities ==
St. Joseph's High School has the following amenities:

- Playground (2 football, 2 hockey, 6 volleyball, 6 basketball, 2 badminton, 6 ko ko, 400 m track and many kabhaddi courts etc.)
- Gym
- Auditorium
- Library
- School buses
- Laboratories
  - Biology
  - Chemistry
  - Computer Science
  - Physics

== Notable alumni ==
- Most Rev. Dr. Michael Augustine, Archbishop of Pondicherry and Cuddalore.
- Most Rev. Dr. Yvon Ambrose, Bishop of Tuticorin
- V. Vaithilingam, Former chief-minister of Pondicherry
- Ere. Elamvazhuthi, Member of Legislative Assembly (MLA) of the Cuddalore constituency of Tamil Nadu from 1967 to 1970 representing Dravida Munnetra Kazhagam (DMK)
- D. S. Amalorpavadass, a third-world theologian who played a vital role in the renewal of life and mission of the Roman Catholic Church in India.
- E. Pugazhendi alias Ela. Pugazhendi, politician and current head of the Students' Wing of DMK
- Duraisamy Simon Cardinal Lourdusamy, Indian cardinal of the Roman Catholic Church
