= M. C. Sampath =

Indian politician

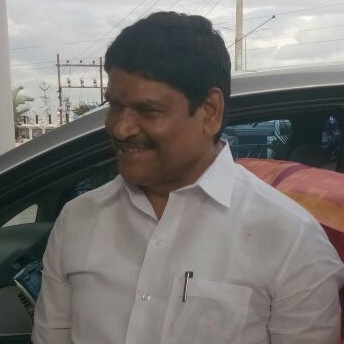

Department of Industries (Tamil Nadu), Government of Tamil Nadu
- In office 23 May 2016 – 6 May 2021
- Chief Minister: J. Jayalalithaa; O. Panneerselvam; Edappadi K. Palaniswami
- Preceded by: P. Thangamani
- Succeeded by: T. R. B. Rajaa

Department of Micro, Small and Medium Enterprises (Tamil Nadu) & Nutritious Noon Meal Government of Tamil Nadu
- Chief Minister: J. Jayalalithaa

Department of Special Programme Implementation (Tamil Nadu), Government of Tamil Nadu
- In office 2013–2016
- Chief Minister: J. Jayalalithaa

Department of Commercial Taxes and Registration (Tamil Nadu) Government of Tamil Nadu
- Chief Minister: J. Jayalalithaa

Minister for Environment Government of Tamil Nadu
- In office 16 May 2011 – 27 September 2014
- Chief Minister: J. Jayalalithaa

Department of Housing and Urban Development (Tamil Nadu) Government of Tamil Nadu
- In office 2002–2004

Personal details
- Born: 24 July 1958 (age 68) Melkumaramangalam, Panruti, Cuddalore district, Tamil Nadu
- Party: Tamilaga Vettri Kazhagam (since June 2026-Present)
- Other political affiliations: All India Anna Dravida Munnetra Kazhagam

M. C. Sampath is an Indian politician and former member of the Tamil Nadu legislative assembly from Cuddalore constituency. He is the former Minister for Department of Industries (Tamil Nadu), Govt. of Tamil Nadu. He represents Anna Dravida Munnetra Kazhagam party.

Sampath was Minister for Department of Special Programme Implementation (Tamil Nadu) until November 2011 when a cabinet reshuffle by Jayalalithaa resulted in him becoming Minister for Rural Industries, where he replaced C. Shanmugavelu.

Following the 2026 Tamil Nadu Legislative Assembly election, Mr Sampath has joined TVK in June 2026.

== Electoral performance ==
2021 Tamil Nadu Legislative Assembly election: Cuddalore
Party	Candidate	Votes	%	±%
DMK	G. Iyappan	84,563	46.46%	+19.53
AIADMK	M. C. Sampath	79,412	43.63%	+2.56
NTK	V. Jaladeepan	9,563	5.25%	−1.98
MNM	K. Anandraj	4,040	2.22%	New
DMDK	A. Gnanapandithan	1,499	0.82%	New
NOTA	NOTA	1,236	0.68%	−0.51
Margin of victory		5,151	2.83%	−11.31%
Turnout		182,001	76.35%	1.66%
Rejected ballots		391	0.21%	
Registered electors		238,364		
DMK gain from AIADMK		Swing	5.39%	

2016 Tamil Nadu Legislative Assembly election: Cuddalore
Party	Candidate	Votes	%	±%
AIADMK	M. C. Sampath	70,922	41.07	−19.49
DMK	Ela. Pugazhendi	46,509	26.93%	−9.9
TMC(M)	A. S. Chandarasekaran	20,608	11.93%	New
PMK	Pazha. Thamaraikannan	16,905	9.79%	New
NTK	Seeman	12,497	7.24%	New
NOTA	NOTA	2,062	1.19%	New
BJP	P. Selvam	1,964	1.14%	+0.02
Margin of victory		24,413	14.14%	−9.59%
Turnout		172,688	74.69%	−3.33%
Registered electors		231,205		
AIADMK hold		Swing	-19.49%	

2011 Tamil Nadu Legislative Assembly election: Cuddalore
Party	Candidate	Votes	%	±%
AIADMK	M. C. Sampath	85,953	60.56%	+17.27
DMK	E. Pugazhendi	52,275	36.83%	−10.93
BJP	R. Gunasekaran	1,579	1.11%	−0.17
Independent	S. V. Rajan	892	0.63%	New
Loktantrik Samajwadi	T. E. Chithrakala	774	0.55%	New
Margin of victory		33,678	23.73%	19.26%
Turnout		141,930	78.02%	6.48%
Registered electors		181,920		
AIADMK gain from DMK		Swing	12.80%	

2001 Tamil Nadu Legislative Assembly election: Nellikkuppam
Party	Candidate	Votes	%	±%
AIADMK	M. C. Sampath	56,349	50.93%	+20.67
DMK	V. C. Shanmugham	48,967	44.26%	−9.58
MDMK	A. S. Soundhararajan	2,713	2.45%	−2.96
Independent	P. Jeyachandran	1,716	1.55%	New
Independent	K. Sekar	886	0.80%	New
Margin of victory		7,382	6.67%	−16.90%
Turnout		110,631	68.95%	−3.64%
Registered electors		160,479		
AIADMK gain from DMK		Swing	-2.90%	

=== 2009 General Elections ===
2009 Indian general election: Cuddalore
Party	Candidate	Votes	%	±%
INC	K. S. Alagiri	320,473	42.81%	
AIADMK	M. C. Sampath	2,96,941	39.67%	4.32%
DMDK	M. C. Dhamotharan	93,172	12.45%	
Independent	S. Vasanthi	13,400	1.79%	
BSP	C. Arokiyadoss	8,269	1.10%	0.35%
Independent	R. Parthiban	5,492	0.73%	
LJP	A. Kamaraj	5,045	0.67%	
Margin of victory		23,532	3.14%	−14.14%
Turnout		7,48,594	76.04%	12.93%
Registered electors		9,86,030		−18.30%
INC gain from DMK		Swing	-9.82%	
