= K. Venkatapathy =

Indian politician

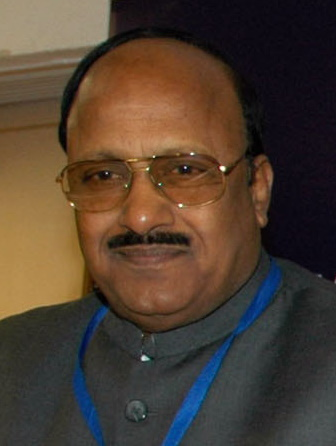
- Venkatapathy in 2008

Minister of State of Law and Justice Government of India
- In office 23 May 2004 – 22 May 2009
- Prime Minister: Manmohan Singh
- Preceded by: P. C. Thomas

Member of parliament Lok Sabha
- In office 16 May 2004 – 16 May 2009
- Preceded by: Adhi Sankar
- Succeeded by: S. Alagiri
- Constituency: Cuddalore

Personal details
- Born: 15 June 1946 (age 79) S.V. Palayam, Sankarapuram Taluk, Tamil Nadu
- Party: DMK
- Spouse: Vasantha
- Children: 1 daughter
- As of 22 September, 2006

Kannusamy Venkatapathy (born 15 June 1946) is a member of the 14th Lok Sabha of India. He represents the Cuddalore constituency of Tamil Nadu and is a member of the Dravida Munnetra Kazhagam (DMK) political party.

He was Minister of State in the Ministry of Law and Justice from 2004.
