= Chidambaram Assembly constituency =

State Legislative Assembly Constituency in Tamil Nadu, India

Coordinates: 11.4°N 79.7°E

Chidambaram
- Constituency No. 158 for the Tamil Nadu Legislative Assembly

Constituency details
- Country: India
- Region: South India
- State: Tamil Nadu
- District: Cuddalore
- Lok Sabha constituency: Chidambaram
- Established: 1951
- Total electors: 2,31,325
- Reservation: None

Member of Legislative Assembly
- 17th Tamil Nadu Legislative Assembly
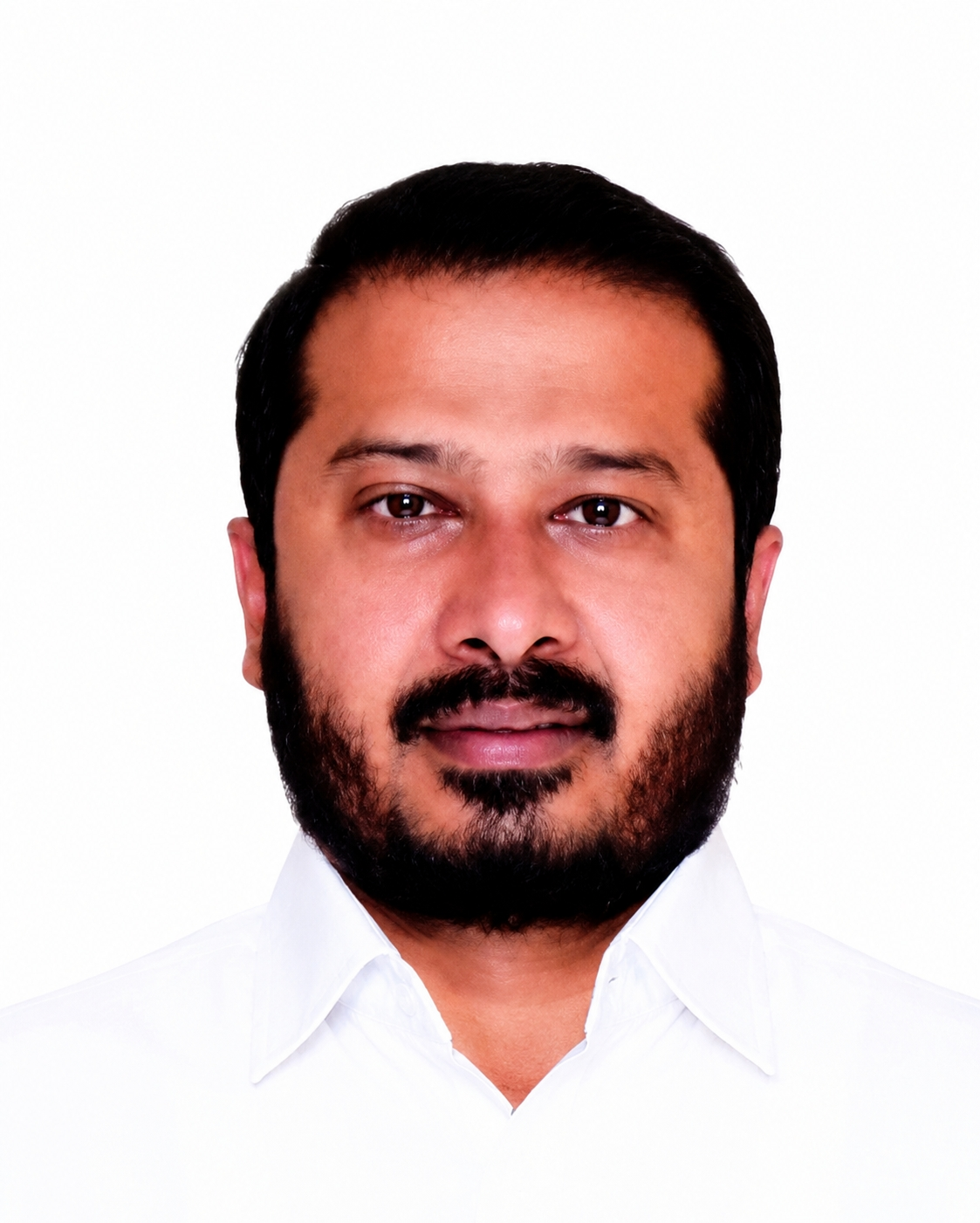
- Incumbent Thamimun Ansari.M
- Party: MJK
- Alliance: SPA
- Elected year: 2026
- Preceded by: K. A. Pandian

Chidambaram is a legislative assembly in Cuddalore district, which includes the city of Chidambaram. It is a part of Chidambaram Lok Sabha constituency. It is one of the 234 State Legislative Assembly Constituencies in Tamil Nadu, in India.

== Members of the Legislative Assembly ==
Election	Member	Party
1952	Swami Sahajananda	Indian National Congress
1952	G. Vagheesam Pillai	Indian National Congress
1957	G. Vagheesam Pillai	Indian National Congress
1957	Swami Sahajananda	Indian National Congress
1962	S. Sivasubramanian	Indian National Congress
1967	R. Kanagasabai Pillai	Indian National Congress
1971	P. Ponchocka Lingam	Dravida Munnetra Kazhagam
1977	Kaliyamoorthy Durai	Dravida Munnetra Kazhagam
1980	K. R. Ganapathi	All India Anna Dravida Munnetra Kazhagam
1984	K. R. Ganapathi	All India Anna Dravida Munnetra Kazhagam
1989	D. Krishnamoorthy	Dravida Munnetra Kazhagam
1991	K. S. Alagiri	Indian National Congress
1996	K. S. Alagiri	Tamil Maanila Congress
2001	K. Saravanan Durai	Dravida Munnetra Kazhagam
2006	A. Arunmozhithevan	All India Anna Dravida Munnetra Kazhagam
2011	K. Balakrishnan	Communist Party of India
2016	K. A. Pandian	All India Anna Dravida Munnetra Kazhagam
2021	K. A. Pandian	All India Anna Dravida Munnetra Kazhagam
2026	M. Thamimun Ansari	Dravida Munnetra Kazhagam

Madras State

== Election results ==
Vote share of Winning candidates
2026	35.48%
2021	50.49%
2016	34.31%
2011	48.30%
2006	50.71%
2001	52.70%
1996	50.52%
1991	51.20%
1989	42.14%
1984	54.55%
1980	51.71%
1977	31.30%
1971	50.33%
1967	49.18%
1962	53.34%
1957	22.75%
1952	27.31%

=== Assembly election 2026 ===
2026 Tamil Nadu Legislative Assembly election : Chidambaram
Party	Candidate	Votes	%	±%
DMK	M. Thamimun Ansari	69,739	35.48%	New
AIADMK	K. A. Pandian	63,992	32.55%	New
TVK	Nedunchezhiyan	54,584	27.77%	New
NTK	Thamizh	6,169	3.14%	▼1.84
NOTA	None of the above	816	0.42%	▼0.24
Margin of victory		5,747	2.92%	▼6.38
Turnout		197,092	85.20%	▲12.03
Total valid votes		196,586		
Registered electors		231,325		▼7.88
DMK gain from AIADMK		Swing	▼15.01	

=== Assembly election 2021 ===
2021 Tamil Nadu Legislative Assembly election : Chidambaram
Party	Candidate	Votes	%	±%
AIADMK	K. A. Pandian	91,961	50.49%	▲16.18
IUML	S. Abdul Rahman	75,024	41.19%	New
NTK	Natarajan Krishnamoorthy	9,071	4.98%	▲4.22
MNM	G. Devasagayam	2,953	1.62%	New
AMMK	M. Nanthinidevi	1,388	0.76%	New
NOTA	None of the above	1,202	0.66%	▼0.34
Margin of victory		16,937	9.30%	▲8.42
Turnout		183,730	73.17%	▼1.62
Total valid votes		182,150		
Rejected ballots		378	0.21%	▼0.24
Registered electors		251,100		▲9.57
AIADMK hold		Swing		

=== Assembly election 2016 ===
2016 Tamil Nadu Legislative Assembly election : Chidambaram
Party	Candidate	Votes	%	±%
AIADMK	K. A. Pandian	58,543	34.31%	New
DMK	K. R. Senthilkumar	57,037	33.43%	▼12.94
PMK	R. Arul	24,226	14.20%	New
CPI(M)	K. Balakrishnan	23,314	13.66%	▼34.64
SDPI	G. Abdul Satthar	1,775	1.04%	New
NOTA	None of the above	1,714	1.00%	New
NTK	B. Sathishkumar (A) Baakyaa	1,295	0.76%	New
BJP	G. Manimaran	1,079	0.63%	▼2.07
Margin of victory		1,506	0.88%	▼1.05
Turnout		171,396	74.79%	▼3.19
Total valid votes		170,619		
Rejected ballots		777	0.45%	▲0.36
Registered electors		229,162		▲19.70
AIADMK gain from CPI(M)		Swing	▼13.99	

=== Assembly election 2011 ===
2011 Tamil Nadu Legislative Assembly election : Chidambaram
Party	Candidate	Votes	%	±%
CPI(M)	K. Balakrishnan	72,054	48.30%	New
DMK	Sridhar Vandaiyar	69,175	46.37%	New
BJP	V. Kannan	4,034	2.70%	▲1.75
LJP	R. Panneer	1,010	0.68%	New
Independent	C. Vinoba	933	0.63%	
Margin of victory		2,879	1.93%	▼13.21
Turnout		149,293	77.98%	▲2.51
Total valid votes		149,166		
Rejected ballots		127	0.09%	▲0.09
Registered electors		191,446		▲30.04
CPI(M) gain from AIADMK		Swing	▼2.41	

=== Assembly election 2006 ===
2006 Tamil Nadu Legislative Assembly election : Chidambaram
Party	Candidate	Votes	%	±%
AIADMK	A. Arunmozhithevan	56,327	50.71%	New
CPI(M)	K. Balakrishnan	39,517	35.58%	New
DMDK	P. Rajamannan	10,303	9.28%	New
BJP	A. Srinivasan	1,054	0.95%	New
Independent	P. Velmurugan	954	0.86%	
Independent	C. Vinoba	797	0.72%	
Margin of victory		16,810	15.14%	▲3.65
Turnout		111,106	75.47%	▲13.35
Total valid votes		111,066		
Registered electors		147,220		▼11.85
AIADMK gain from DMK		Swing	▼1.99	

=== Assembly election 2001 ===
2001 Tamil Nadu Legislative Assembly election : Chidambaram
Party	Candidate	Votes	%	±%
DMK	K. Saravanan Durai	54,647	52.70%	New
PMK	T. Arivuselvan	42,732	41.21%	▲22.06
MDMK	K. V. Mohana Sundar	3,765	3.63%	▼2.31
Independent	V. Jayaraj	1,089	1.05%	
Independent	S. Anbazhagan	958	0.92%	
Margin of victory		11,915	11.49%	▼16.67
Turnout		103,738	62.12%	▼8.79
Total valid votes		103,702		
Rejected ballots		36	0.03%	▼4.96
Registered electors		167,006		▲9.88
DMK gain from TMC(M)		Swing	▲2.18	

=== Assembly election 1996 ===
1996 Tamil Nadu Legislative Assembly election : Chidambaram
Party	Candidate	Votes	%	±%
TMC(M)	K. S. Alagiri	52,066	50.52%	New
INC	A. Radhakrishnan	23,050	22.37%	▼28.83
PMK	K. Devadoss	19,737	19.15%	▲2.44
MDMK	Durai Krishnamoorthy	6,121	5.94%	New
Margin of victory		29,016	28.16%	▲7.53
Turnout		107,780	70.91%	▲1.77
Total valid votes		103,050		
Rejected ballots		5,379	4.99%	▲1.75
Registered electors		151,992		▲6.76
TMC(M) gain from INC		Swing	▼0.68	

=== Assembly election 1991 ===
1991 Tamil Nadu Legislative Assembly election : Chidambaram
Party	Candidate	Votes	%	±%
INC	K. S. Alagiri	48,767	51.20%	▲28.78
DMK	M. R. K. Panneerselvam	29,114	30.57%	▼11.57
PMK	K. Devadasu	15,913	16.71%	New
Margin of victory		19,653	20.63%	▲0.92
Turnout		98,437	69.14%	▲1.54
Total valid votes		95,244		
Rejected ballots		3,193	3.24%	▲1.35
Registered electors		142,369		▲11.32
INC gain from DMK		Swing	▲9.06	

=== Assembly election 1989 ===
1989 Tamil Nadu Legislative Assembly election : Chidambaram
Party	Candidate	Votes	%	±%
DMK	D. Krishnamoorthy	35,738	42.14%	▼1.70
INC	A. Radhakrishnan	19,018	22.42%	New
Independent	N. Arumugam	12,363	14.58%	
AIADMK	K. P. Panneerselvam	10,088	11.89%	New
CPI	T. Manivasagam	5,371	6.33%	New
Independent	K. Dharuman	706	0.83%	
Margin of victory		16,720	19.71%	▲9.00
Turnout		86,451	67.60%	▼11.60
Total valid votes		84,813		
Rejected ballots		1,638	1.89%	▼2.64
Registered electors		127,893		▲12.07
DMK gain from AIADMK		Swing	▼12.41	

=== Assembly election 1984 ===
1984 Tamil Nadu Legislative Assembly election : Chidambaram
Party	Candidate	Votes	%	±%
AIADMK	K. R. Ganapathi	47,067	54.55%	▲2.84
DMK	K. S. Subramanian	37,824	43.84%	▼3.82
Independent	D. Arulmozhi	1,171	1.36%	
Margin of victory		9,243	10.71%	▲6.66
Turnout		90,376	79.20%	▲6.37
Total valid votes		86,285		
Rejected ballots		4,091	4.53%	▲3.23
Registered electors		114,114		▲1.64
AIADMK hold		Swing		

=== Assembly election 1980 ===
1980 Tamil Nadu Legislative Assembly election : Chidambaram
Party	Candidate	Votes	%	±%
AIADMK	K. R. Ganapathi	41,728	51.71%	New
DMK	Kaliyamoorthy Durai	38,461	47.66%	▲16.36
Margin of victory		3,267	4.05%	▼0.50
Turnout		81,763	72.83%	▲5.15
Total valid votes		80,699		
Rejected ballots		1,064	1.30%	▲0.05
Registered electors		112,269		▲2.47
AIADMK gain from DMK		Swing	▲20.41	

=== Assembly election 1977 ===
1977 Tamil Nadu Legislative Assembly election : Chidambaram
Party	Candidate	Votes	%	±%
DMK	Kaliyamoorthy Durai	22,917	31.30%	▼19.03
AIADMK	Muthugovindarajan	19,586	26.75%	New
INC	B. Umapathy	15,644	21.36%	New
JP	A. Sambandam	10,960	14.97%	New
Independent	N. Rathinasamy	1,817	2.48%	
Independent	M. Sanjeevi	1,422	1.94%	
Independent	K. Dharuman	474	0.65%	
Margin of victory		3,331	4.55%	▲2.19
Turnout		74,156	67.68%	▼8.92
Total valid votes		73,226		
Rejected ballots		930	1.25%	▲1.25
Registered electors		109,561		▲14.58
DMK hold		Swing		

=== Assembly election 1971 ===
1971 Tamil Nadu Legislative Assembly election : Chidambaram
Party	Candidate	Votes	%	±%
DMK	P. Ponchocka Lingam	35,750	50.33%	▲3.34
INC	R. Gopala Krishnan	34,071	47.97%	New
Independent	Satchidanandama	1,206	1.70%	
Margin of victory		1,679	2.36%	▲0.17
Turnout		73,245	76.60%	▼4.86
Total valid votes		71,027		
Registered electors		95,620		▲5.59
DMK gain from INC		Swing	▲1.15	

=== Assembly election 1967 ===
1967 Madras State Legislative Assembly election : Chidambaram
Party	Candidate	Votes	%	±%
INC	R. Kanagasabai Pillai	34,911	49.18%	▼4.16
DMK	P. Ponchocka Lingam	33,356	46.99%	▲8.97
Independent	R. Govindarajan	1,881	2.65%	
Independent	P. Natarajan	834	1.17%	
Margin of victory		1,555	2.19%	▼13.13
Turnout		73,772	81.46%	▲15.15
Total valid votes		70,982		
Registered electors		90,560		▼7.75
INC hold		Swing		

=== Assembly election 1962 ===
1962 Madras State Legislative Assembly election : Chidambaram
Party	Candidate	Votes	%	±%
INC	S. Sivasubramanian	33,438	53.34%	▲7.95
DMK	K. Arumugham	23,837	38.02%	New
CPI	A. Munusami	5,413	8.63%	New
Margin of victory		9,601	15.32%	▲11.10
Turnout		65,102	66.31%	▼32.83
Total valid votes		62,688		
Registered electors		98,172		▼40.57
INC hold		Swing		

=== Assembly election 1957 ===
1957 Madras State Legislative Assembly election : Chidambaram
Party	Candidate	Votes	%	±%
INC	G. Vagheesam Pillai	37,255	22.75%	▼27.66
INC	Swami Sahajananda	37,089	22.64%	▼27.77
Independent	Chockalingam	30,345	18.53%	
Independent	S. Sivasubramanian	26,489	16.17%	
Independent	Gopala Krishnan	23,546	14.38%	
Independent	V. Kuppusamy	5,420	3.31%	
Independent	A. Shanmugam	3,643	2.22%	
Margin of victory		6,910	4.22%	▼2.00
Turnout		163,787	99.14%	▲44.15
Total valid votes		163,787		
Registered electors		165,203		▲25.58
INC hold		Swing		

=== Assembly election 1952 ===
1952 Madras State Legislative Assembly election : Chidambaram
Party	Candidate	Votes	%	±%
INC	Swami Sahajananda	39,509	27.31%	New
INC	G. Vagheesam Pillai	33,427	23.10%	New
TTP	Swamikannu	30,517	21.09%	New
TTP	Sivasubramanian	25,760	17.80%	New
RPI	Kuppuswami	9,606	6.64%	New
Socialist Party (India)	Govindarajan	5,861	4.05%	New
Margin of victory		8,992	6.22%	
Turnout		144,680	54.99%	
Total valid votes		144,680		
Registered electors		131,550		
INC win (new seat)				
