= R. Kodimari =

Indian politician

- ஆர். கோடிமாரி

Member of the Tamil Nadu Legislative Assembly
- In office 1991–1996
- Preceded by: G. Veeraiyan
- Succeeded by: G. Nizamuddin
- Constituency: Nagapattinam

Personal details
- Born: 1 June 1949 (age 76) Nagapattinam, Madras State, India
- Party: All India Anna Dravida Munnetra Kazhagam
- Occupation: Fishing

R. Kodimari (born 1 June 1949) is an Indian politician and a former Member of the Tamil Nadu Legislative Assembly. He hails from Akkarapettai village in the Nagapattinam district.

Having completed his school education, Kodimari is a member of the All India Anna Dravida Munnetra Kazhagam (AIADMK) party. He was elected to the Tamil Nadu Legislative Assembly from the Nagapattinam Assembly constituency in the 1991 elections.

== Electoral Performance ==
=== 1991 ===
1991 Tamil Nadu Legislative Assembly election: Nagapattinam
Party	Candidate	Votes	%	±%
AIADMK	R. Kodimari	53,050	52.20%	+35.51
CPI(M)	G. Veeraiyan	43,116	42.42%	−2.27
PMK	P. V. Chockalingam	3,411	3.36%	New
BJP	V. A. R. Ambikapathy	1,329	1.31%	New
Margin of victory		9,934	9.77%	−4.03%
Turnout		101,629	70.33%	−6.39%
Registered electors		149,065		
AIADMK gain from CPI(M)		Swing	7.50%	
