= Manithaneya Jananayaga Katchi =

- Abbreviation: MJK
- General Secretary: M. Thamimum Ansari
- Founder: M. Thamimum Ansari
- Founded: 28 February 2016 (10 years ago)
- Split from: Manithaneya Makkal Katchi
- Headquarters: No. 5/2, Linghi Chetty Street, Mannady, Chennai – 600001, Tamil Nadu
- Ideology: Social justice Secularism
- Political position: Left-wing
- Colours: Black, White, Dark Red
- ECI Status: Registered Unrecognised Party
- Alliance: SPA
- Seats in Rajya Sabha: 0 / 245
- Seats in Lok Sabha: 0 / 543
- Seats in Tamil Nadu Legislative Assembly: 1 / 234
- Number of states and union territories in government: 0 / 31

Party flag
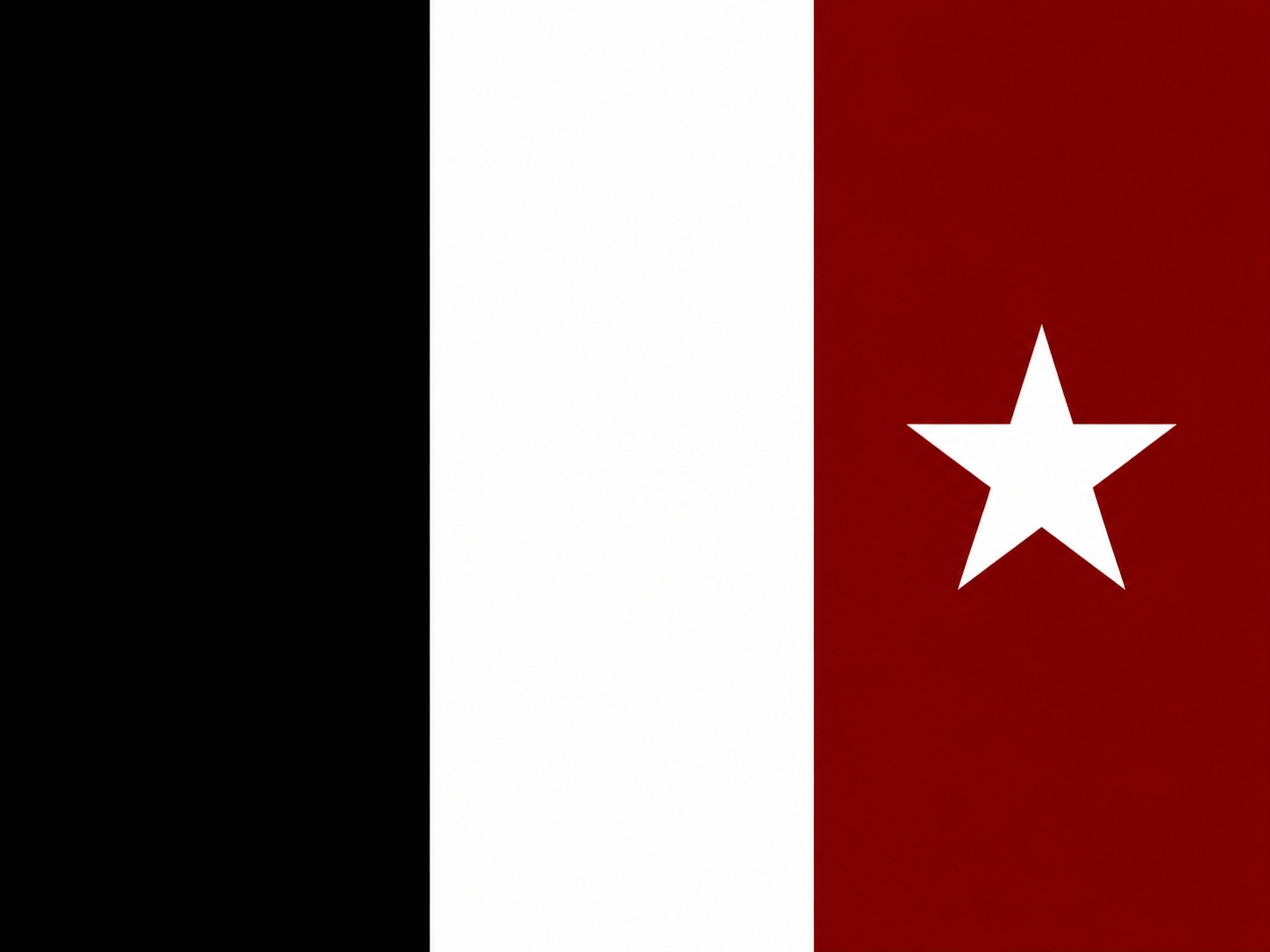

Website
- http://www.mjkparty.com

The Manithaneya Jananayaga Katchi (MJK) is a state-level political party in Tamil Nadu. The Manithaneya Jananayaga Katchi was launched on February 28, 2016, following a split from the Manithaneya Makkal Katchi.

== Elections contested ==
Election	Constituency	Candidate	Alliance	Result	Vote %	Predecessor / Successor	Party	Vote %	Ref
2026	Chidambaram	Thamimum Ansari	SPA	**Won**	35.48%	K. A. Pandian	AIADMK	32.55%	
2016	Nagapattinam	Thamimum Ansari	AIADMK	**Won**	48.28%	A. Mohamed Jafarullah	MNMK	32.99%	
2016	Vellore	Harun Rasheed	AIADMK	Loss	36.23%	P. Karthikeyan	DMK	51.53%	

== Tamil Nadu Legislative Assembly Election, 2016 ==
The Manithaneya Jananayaga Katchi announced that it would contest the 2016 Tamil Nadu Legislative Assembly election as part of the AIADMK alliance.

Two constituencies were allotted to the Manithaneya Jananayaga Katchi within the AIADMK alliance.

The party contested in the Vellore and Nagapattinam constituencies under the 'Two Leaves' symbol. In the Nagapattinam Assembly constituency, the party's General Secretary, M. Thamimun Ansari, emerged victorious with a margin of 20,550 votes.
