= Swami Sahajananda (Chidambaram MLA) =

Indian politician

Swami Sahajananda (சுவாமி சகஜானந்தா )(Jan 1891 - May 1959) was an Indian politician and former Member of the Legislative Assembly of Tamil Nadu. He was born on January 29, 1891 in North Arcot District. He was elected to the Tamil Nadu legislative assembly as an Indian National Congress candidate from Chidambaram constituency in 1952, and 1957 elections. G. Vagheesam Pillai from Congress party was the second winner in both elections.

He was a member of the Tamil Nadu Legislative Council between 1926 and 1932 and again between 1936 and 1947. After Independence, he was elected to the Assembly from the Chidambaram constituency and continued as a member till his death in 1959.
