= G. Iyappan =

Indian politician

Member of the Tamil Nadu Legislative Assembly
- In office 2 May 2021 – 4 May 2026
- Constituency: Cuddalore
- In office 11 May 2006 — 13 May 2006
- Constituency: Cuddalore

Personal details
- Party: Dravida Munnetra Kazhagam

G. Iyappan (கோ. அய்யப்பன்) is an Indian politician and a member of Legislative Assembly of Tamil Nadu. A native of Cuddalore district, his profession according to the election affidavit filed with the Election Commission is: Real Estate, Farmer. G Iyappan's educational qualifications are: Post Graduate and is 63 years old (2021). He has been elected to the Tamil Nadu legislative assembly as a Dravida Munnetra Kazhagam candidate from Cuddalore constituency in 2006 and 2021. He has two sons, Dr. Praveen and Vinoth.

== Electoral performance ==
2021 Tamil Nadu Legislative Assembly election: Cuddalore
Party	Candidate	Votes	%	±%
DMK	G. Iyappan	84,563	46.46%	+19.53
AIADMK	M. C. Sampath	79,412	43.63%	+2.56
NTK	V. Jaladeepan	9,563	5.25%	−1.98
MNM	K. Anandraj	4,040	2.22%	New
DMDK	A. Gnanapandithan	1,499	0.82%	New
NOTA	NOTA	1,236	0.68%	−0.51
Margin of victory		5,151	2.83%	−11.31%
Turnout		182,001	76.35%	1.66%
Rejected ballots		391	0.21%	
Registered electors		238,364		
DMK gain from AIADMK		Swing	5.39%	

2006 Tamil Nadu Legislative Assembly election: Cuddalore
Party	Candidate	Votes	%	±%
DMK	G. Iyappan	67,003	47.76%	+2.15
AIADMK	G. Kumar	60,737	43.30%	New
DMDK	G. V. Jayakumar	7,866	5.61%	New
BJP	P. Sivakumar	1,803	1.29%	New
Independent	S. Sriramulu	797	0.57%	New
Independent	J. Srivathsan	776	0.55%	New
Margin of victory		6,266	4.47%	4.44%
Turnout		140,286	71.54%	14.95%
Registered electors		196,095		
DMK hold		Swing	2.15%	
