= V. Muthukumar =

Indian politician

Member for Tamil Nadu Legislative Assembly
- In office 23 May 2011 – 21 May 2016
- Preceded by: Vijayakanth
- Succeeded by: V. T. Kalaiselvan
- Constituency: Virudhachalam

Personal details
- Born: V. Muthukumar; 25 February 1978 (age 48) Vriddhachalam, Cuddalore district, Tamil nadu India
- Party: Dravida Munnetra Kazhagam
- Other political affiliations: Desiya Murpokku Dravida Kazhagam
- Parent: Vijayabhaskar (father)

Vijayabhaskar Muthukumar is a Former Member of the Tamil Nadu Legislative Assembly from the Vridhachalam constituency. He represents the Dravida Munnetra Kazhagam party.
