= Pugazhendhi =

Pugazhendhi is a name. People with the name include:

- Pugazhendhi Thangaraj
- E. Pugazhendhi
