= Nagapattinam Assembly constituency =

One of the 234 State Legislative Assembly Constituencies in Tamil Nadu, in India

Coordinates: 10.77°N 79.83°E

Nagapattinam
- Constituency No. 163 for the Tamil Nadu Legislative Assembly

Constituency details
- Country: India
- Region: South India
- State: Tamil Nadu
- District: Nagapattinam
- Lok Sabha constituency: Nagapattinam
- Established: 1951
- Total electors: 1,74,736
- Reservation: None

Member of Legislative Assembly
- 17th Tamil Nadu Legislative Assembly
- Incumbent M. H. Jawahirullah
- Party: DMK
- Alliance: SPA
- Elected year: 2026

Nagapattinam is a state assembly constituency in Tamil Nadu. It is one of the 234 State Legislative Assembly Constituencies in Tamil Nadu, in India. Elections and winners from this constituency are listed below. It comprises the entirety of Thirumarugal union block and part of Nagapattinam union block.

== Members of Legislative Assembly ==
Year	Member	Political party
Madras State
1952	Vadivelu and Sivaraj	Communist Party of India
1957	N. S. Ramalingam	Indian National Congress
1962	A. M. P. S. Balagangadaran	Indian National Congress
1967	K. R. Gnanasambandan	Communist Party of India (Marxist)
Tamil Nadu
1971	Rajamanickam	Dravida Munnetra Kazhagam
1977	R. Umanath	Communist Party of India (Marxist)
1980	R. Umanath	Communist Party of India (Marxist)
1984	G. Veeraiyan	Communist Party of India (Marxist)
1989	G. Veeraiyan	Communist Party of India (Marxist)
1991	R. Kodimari	All India Anna Dravida Munnetra Kazhagam
1996	G. Nizamudeen	Dravida Munnetra Kazhagam
2001	R. Jeevanantham	All India Anna Dravida Munnetra Kazhagam
2006	V. Marimuthu	Communist Party of India (Marxist)
2011	K. A. Jayapal	All India Anna Dravida Munnetra Kazhagam
2016	Thamimum Ansari	All India Anna Dravida Munnetra Kazhagam
2021	J. Mohamed Shanavas	Viduthalai Chiruthaigal Katchi
2026	M. H. Jawahirullah	Dravida Munnetra Kazhagam

== Election results ==
Vote share of winning candidates
2026	37.21%
2021	46.46%
2016	48.28%
2011	51.26%
2006	45.83%
2001	53.55%
1996	43.68%
1991	52.20%
1989	44.70%
1984	48.24%
1980	51.38%
1977	39.65%
1971	44.80%
1967	56.40%
1962	42.89%
1957	52.09%
1952	24.14%

=== 2026 ===
2026 Tamil Nadu Legislative Assembly election: Nagapattinam
Party	Candidate	Votes	%	±%
DMK	M. H. Jawahirullah	56,305	37.21	New
TVK	Sugumar.M	46,524	30.74	New
AIADMK	Thanka.Kathiravan	41,586	27.48	▼13.91
NTK	Fathima Farhana.S	5,348	3.53	▼3.46
NOTA	NOTA	479	0.32	▼0.31
All India Youth Development Party	J.V.Durai	207	0.14	New
Independent	Vijayaragavan.N	164	0.11	New
Independent	N. P. Bhashgaran	155	0.10	New
Independent	Prem.S	150	0.10	New
Independent	Sakthivel	136	0.09	New
PT	Rajasekar.K	86	0.06	New
Independent	Iyyankalai.M	72	0.05	New
TVK	Vallabadas.E	60	0.04	New
Independent	Kathiravan.T	54	0.04	New
Margin of victory		9,781	6.47	▲1.40
Turnout		1,51,326	86.60	▲14.51
Registered electors		1,74,736		
DMK gain from VCK		Swing	New	

=== 2021 ===
2021 Tamil Nadu Legislative Assembly election: Nagapattinam
Party	Candidate	Votes	%	±%
VCK	Aloor Shanavas	66,281	46.46	New
AIADMK	Thanka Kathiravan	59,043	41.39	−6.89
NTK	S. Augustine Arputharaj	9,976	6.99	+5.83
AMMK	C. Manjula	3,503	2.46	New
MNM	Syed Anas Mohideen Sahip	2,540	1.78	New
NOTA	None of the above	895	0.63	−0.11
Margin of victory		7,238	5.07	−10.21
Turnout		142,665	72.09	−1.33
VCK gain from AIADMK		Swing	-1.82	

=== 2016 ===
2016 Tamil Nadu Legislative Assembly election: Nagapattinam
Party	Candidate	Votes	%	±%
AIADMK	Thamimum Ansari	64,903	48.28	−2.99
MNMK	A. Mohamed Jafarullah	44,353	32.99	New
CPI	A. B. Dhameem Ansari Sahib	11,088	8.25	New
BJP	K. Nethaji	6,005	4.47	+2.83
NTK	T. Niraintha Selvam	1,557	1.16	New
PMK	A. Balraj	1,036	0.77	New
Independent	J. Jabarullah	1,018	0.76	New
NOTA	None of the above	996	0.74	New
Margin of victory		20,550	15.29	10.53
Turnout		134,439	73.42	−6.05
AIADMK hold		Swing	-2.99	

=== 2011 ===
2011 Tamil Nadu Legislative Assembly election: Nagapattinam
Party	Candidate	Votes	%	±%
AIADMK	K. A. Jayapal	61,870	51.26	+7.31
DMK	Mohamed Sheik Dawood	56,127	46.51	New
BJP	M. Muruganantham	1,972	1.63	+0.23
BSP	A. Jagabar Sathick	721	0.60	New
Margin of victory		5,743	4.76	2.88
Turnout		151,882	79.46	+3.59
AIADMK gain from CPI(M)		Swing	5.43	

=== 2006 ===
2006 Tamil Nadu Legislative Assembly election: Nagapattinam
Party	Candidate	Votes	%	±%
CPI(M)	V. Marimuthu	57,315	45.83%	New
AIADMK	K. A. Jayapal	54,971	43.96%	−9.6
DMDK	Peru. Mathiyalagan	9,949	7.96%	New
BJP	S. Karthikeyan	1,758	1.41%	New
NCP	S. Basheer	655	0.52%	New
Margin of victory		2,344	1.87%	−13.09%
Turnout		125,060	75.88%	9.05%
Registered electors		164,819		
CPI(M) gain from AIADMK		Swing	-7.72%	

=== 2001 ===
2001 Tamil Nadu Legislative Assembly election: Nagapattinam
Party	Candidate	Votes	%	±%
AIADMK	R. Jeevanantham	59,808	53.55%	+28.4
DMK	S. P. Thangaiya	43,091	38.59%	−5.09
Independent	G. Nizamudeen	4,919	4.40%	New
MDMK	Ragu Kumar G	2,368	2.12%	New
Independent	V. S. Packirisami	1,490	1.33%	New
Margin of victory		16,717	14.97%	−3.55%
Turnout		111,676	66.83%	−5.91%
Registered electors		167,176		
AIADMK gain from DMK		Swing	9.88%	

=== 1996 ===
1996 Tamil Nadu Legislative Assembly election: Nagapattinam
Party	Candidate	Votes	%	±%
DMK	G. Nizamudeen	46,533	43.68%	New
AIADMK	R. Jeevanantham	26,805	25.16%	−27.04
CPI(M)	V. Marimuthu	20,990	19.70%	−22.72
AIIC(T)	P. Rajendren	9,992	9.38%	New
BJP	S. Pugazhendi	1,578	1.48%	+0.17
Margin of victory		19,728	18.52%	8.74%
Turnout		106,542	72.74%	2.41%
Registered electors		154,116		
DMK gain from AIADMK		Swing	-8.52%	

=== 1991 ===
1991 Tamil Nadu Legislative Assembly election: Nagapattinam
Party	Candidate	Votes	%	±%
AIADMK	R. Kodimari	53,050	52.20%	+35.51
CPI(M)	G. Veeraiyan	43,116	42.42%	−2.27
PMK	P. V. Chockalingam	3,411	3.36%	New
BJP	V. A. R. Ambikapathy	1,329	1.31%	New
Margin of victory		9,934	9.77%	−4.03%
Turnout		101,629	70.33%	−6.39%
Registered electors		149,065		
AIADMK gain from CPI(M)		Swing	7.50%	

=== 1989 ===
1989 Tamil Nadu Legislative Assembly election: Nagapattinam
Party	Candidate	Votes	%	±%
CPI(M)	G. Veeraiyan	44,681	44.70%	−3.55
INC	Pon Palanivelu	30,884	30.90%	New
AIADMK	N. Ila Muruguselvam	16,682	16.69%	−26.05
AIADMK	S. Thengovan	6,800	6.80%	−35.94
Margin of victory		13,797	13.80%	8.30%
Turnout		99,963	76.72%	−2.58%
Registered electors		132,478		
CPI(M) hold		Swing	-3.55%	

=== 1984 ===
1984 Tamil Nadu Legislative Assembly election: Nagapattinam
Party	Candidate	Votes	%	±%
CPI(M)	G. Veeraiyan	43,684	48.24%	−3.13
AIADMK	S. Thenkovan	38,698	42.74%	New
Independent	K. Kannabiran	6,248	6.90%	New
INC(J)	N. Elamuruguselvan	850	0.94%	New
Margin of victory		4,986	5.51%	2.75%
Turnout		90,547	79.30%	2.21%
Registered electors		118,310		
CPI(M) hold		Swing	-3.13%	

=== 1980 ===
1980 Tamil Nadu Legislative Assembly election: Nagapattinam
Party	Candidate	Votes	%	±%
CPI(M)	R. Umanath	44,105	51.38%	+11.73
INC	S. S. R. Ramanatha Thevar	41,738	48.62%	+34.07
Margin of victory		2,367	2.76%	1.86%
Turnout		85,843	77.09%	5.35%
Registered electors		112,499		
CPI(M) hold		Swing	11.73%	

=== 1977 ===
1977 Tamil Nadu Legislative Assembly election: Nagapattinam
Party	Candidate	Votes	%	±%
CPI(M)	R. Umanath	31,519	39.65%	+19.61
DMK	A. Ambalavanan	30,809	38.76%	−6.04
INC	M. Basheer Ahmed	11,570	14.56%	−20.6
JP	D. Chakrapany	5,590	7.03%	New
Margin of victory		710	0.89%	−8.75%
Turnout		79,488	71.74%	−4.57%
Registered electors		111,891		
CPI(M) gain from DMK		Swing	-5.15%	

=== 1971 ===
1971 Tamil Nadu Legislative Assembly election: Nagapattinam
Party	Candidate	Votes	%	±%
DMK	Rajamanickam	29,744	44.80%	New
INC	Ramanatha Thevar	23,342	35.16%	−5.62
CPI(M)	K. R. Ganasampandan	13,306	20.04%	−36.35
Margin of victory		6,402	9.64%	−5.97%
Turnout		66,392	76.31%	−5.58%
Registered electors		91,497		
DMK gain from CPI(M)		Swing	-11.59%	

=== 1967 ===
1967 Madras Legislative Assembly election: Nagapattinam
Party	Candidate	Votes	%	±%
CPI(M)	K. R. Gnanasambandan	36,596	56.40%	New
INC	R. R. V. Naidu	26,462	40.78%	−2.12
CPI	V. Mahalingam	1,428	2.20%	−29.61
Independent	Thandapani	406	0.63%	New
Margin of victory		10,134	15.62%	4.53%
Turnout		64,892	81.89%	1.26%
Registered electors		81,237		
CPI(M) gain from INC		Swing	13.50%	

=== 1962 ===
1962 Madras Legislative Assembly election: Nagapattinam
Party	Candidate	Votes	%	±%
INC	A. M. P. S. Balagangadharan	27,447	42.89%	−9.2
CPI	G. Bhaktavachalam	20,355	31.81%	+2.43
IUML	Sarana baskaran T.M.M.Ahamed (koothanallur)	16,186	25.30%	New
Margin of victory		7,092	11.08%	−11.63%
Turnout		63,988	80.63%	22.98%
Registered electors		81,745		
INC hold		Swing	-9.20%	

=== 1957 ===
1957 Madras Legislative Assembly election: Nagapattinam
Party	Candidate	Votes	%	±%
INC	N. S. Ramalingam	24,552	52.09%	+30.44
CPI	P. Jeevanandam	13,847	29.38%	+5.23
Independent	M. Hanifa	6,527	13.85%	New
Independent	S. Rajagopal Naidu	2,207	4.68%	New
Margin of victory		10,705	22.71%	21.36%
Turnout		47,133	57.65%	−57.79%
Registered electors		81,753		
INC gain from CPI		Swing	27.95%	

=== 1952 ===
1952 Madras Legislative Assembly election: Nagapattinam
Party	Candidate	Votes	%	±%
CPI	Sivaraj	39,027	24.14%	New
CPI	Vadivelu	36,846	22.79%	New
INC	Doraiswami	34,996	21.65%	New
INC	Shanmugasundaram Pillai	32,226	19.94%	New
Socialist Party (India)	Appu Ayyar	5,704	3.53%	New
Independent	Lasa Maricayar	5,210	3.22%	New
RPI	Arumugham	4,655	2.88%	New
Independent	Ganapathi Thevar	2,981	1.84%	New
Margin of victory		2,181	1.35%	
Turnout		161,645	115.44%	
Registered electors		140,027		
CPI win (new seat)				
