= P. R. S. Venkatesan =

Indian politician

P. R. S. Venkatesan is an Indian politician and former Member of Parliament elected from Tamil Nadu. He was elected to the Lok Sabha from Cuddalore constituency as an Indian National Congress (INC) candidate in the 1984 and 1989 elections, and as a Tamil Maanila Congress (Moopanar) candidate in the 1996 election.

He also served as a Member of the Legislative Assembly of Tamil Nadu. He was elected to the Tamil Nadu legislative assembly as an INC candidate from Cuddalore constituency in the 1991 election.
