= A. Arunmozhithevan =

Indian politician

Member of the Tamil Nadu Legislative Assembly
- Incumbent
- Assumed office 12 May 2021
- Preceded by: K. Saravanan Durai
- Constituency: Bhuvanagiri
- In office 11 May 2006 – 13 May 2011
- Succeeded by: K. Balakrishnan
- Constituency: Chidambaram

Member of Parliament, Lok Sabha
- In office 1 September 2014 — 23 May 2019
- Preceded by: K. S. Alagiri
- Succeeded by: T. R. V. S. Ramesh
- Constituency: Cuddalore

Personal details
- Born: 2 June 1968 (age 58) Tittakudi, Madras State, India (present-day Cuddalore, Tamil Nadu)
- Party: All India Anna Dravida Munnetra Kazhagam
- Parent: A. V. Arumugam (father)

Arumugam Arunmozhithevan (born 1968) is an Indian politician. He is currently serving as Member Of Tamil Nadu Legislative Assembly for Bhuvanagiri constituency since 2021. He was a Member of Parliament elected from Tamil Nadu, elected to the Lok Sabha from Cuddalore constituency as an Anna Dravida Munnetra Kazhagam candidate in 2014 election.

== Political career ==
In September 2018, Bharatiya Janata Party's H Raja had accused Arunmozhithevan of encroaching upon a temple land in Thittakudi. Arunmozhithevan criticized Raja and said H Raja was mentally affected, seeking to create communal clashes in the state. Five days after Arunmozhithevan submitted a petition seeking action against H Raja for making baseless allegations against him, the Central Crime Branch said that cases have been registered against the BJP leader H Raja under various sections.

== Electoral performance ==
Election	Constituency	Political party	Result	Vote %	Opposition			Ref
Election	Constituency	Political party	Result	Vote %	Candidate	Political party	Vote %	Ref
2006	Chidambaram	AIADMK	Won	50.71%	K. Balakrishnan	CPI(M)	35.58%	
2021	Bhuvanagiri	AIADMK	Won	49.18%	K. Saravanan Durai	DMK	44.97%	-
2026	Bhuvanagiri	AIADMK	Won	36.52%	K. Saravanan Durai	DMK	35.32%	-
