= G. Nizamudeen =

Indian politician

G. Nizamudeen alias MGK. Nizamudeen was elected to the Tamil Nadu Legislative Assembly from the Nagapattinam constituency in the 1996 elections. He was a candidate of the Indian National League in alliance with Dravida Munnetra Kazhagam (DMK) party.

He is currently the All India General Secretary of Indian National League.
