= K. A. Jayapal =

Indian politician

K.A.Jayabal

Minister For Fisheries Government of Tamil Nadu
- In office 15 MAY 2011 – 14 May 2016

Member of legislative assembly for Tamil Nadu (Nagapattinam constituency)
- In office 15 MAY 2011 – 14 May 2016

District secretary of Nagapattinam (AIADMK)
- In office 4 July 2011 – 14 May 2016

K. A. Jayapal (born 7 March 1955) is an Indian politician and was a member of the 14th Tamil Nadu Legislative Assembly from Nagapattinam constituency. He represented the All India Anna Dravida Munnetra Kazhagam (AIADMK) party.

Jayapal was appointed as the Minister for Fisheries in the Government of Tamil Nadu after the 2011 state assembly elections. He was district secretary of the AIADMK's unit in Nagapattinam until Jayalalithaa, the then Chief Minister and party leader, replaced him with O. S. Manian in April 2016. He was not selected by the party to contest the 2016 state assembly elections, in common with over 100 other sitting AIADMK MLAs. Jayalalithaa had decided to reward people who had shifted their support to the AIADMK from the Desiya Murpokku Dravida Kazhagam, Dravida Munnetra Kazhagam and Pattali Makkal Katchi.

In February 2017, Jayapal switched his support from V. K. Sasikala to O. Paneerselvam in a tortuous power-struggle for control the party following the death of Jayalalithaa. He was among those whom Sasikala then expelled for "anti-party activities".

== Personal life ==
Jayapal was born on 7 March 1955 in Akkaraipet, where he later served as the panchayat president for 1996–2001. He has a BCom degree and is married with three children.
