= L.K. Sudhish =

Indian politician

L. K. Sudhish
- Sudhish during campaign shoot

Member of Parliament, Rajya Sabha
- Incumbent
- Assumed office 3 April 2026
- Preceded by: Kanimozhi N. V. N. Somu
- Constituency: Tamil Nadu

Personal details
- Born: 21 September 1977 (age 48) Ambur, Tamil Nadu, India
- Party: Desiya Murpokku Dravida Kazhagam
- Spouse: Poornajothi
- Relations: Premalatha Vijayakanth (sister)
- Children: 2
- Occupation: Politician, Film producer

L. K. Sudhish is an Indian politician from Tamil Nadu. He is serving as the Treasurer of Desiya Murpokku Dravida Kazhagam as of 2026. He was elected to the Rajya Sabha, the upper house of Indian Parliament, from Tamil Nadu in March 2026.

He is younger brother to Premalatha Vijayakanth, the current general secretary of the DMDK and wife of its founder Vijayakanth. He contested from the Gudiyatham assembly constituency in 2006 and lost. He contested the Lok Sabha elections from Kallakurichi in 2009, Salem in 2014 and Kallakurichi in 2019. He is a close aide to Premalatha Vijayakanth.

== Electoral History ==
=== Tamil Nadu Legislative Assembly ===
Year	Constituency	Party	Votes	%	Opponent	Party	Votes	%	Result	Margin	%
2006	Gudiyatham	DMDK	20,557	16.94	G. Latha	CPI(M)	48,166	39.70	Lost	-27,609	-22.76

=== Lok Sabha ===
Year	Constituency	Party	Votes	%	Opponent	Party	Votes	%	Result	Margin	%
2019	Kallakurichi	DMDK	3,21,794	26.85	Gautham Sigamani	DMK	7,21,713	60.22	Lost	-3,99,919	-33.37
2014	Salem	DMDK	2,01,265	17.82	V. Pannerselvam	ADMK	5,56,546	49.27	Lost	-3,55,281	-31.45
2009	Kallakurichi	DMDK	1,32,223	15.52	Adhi Sankar	DMK	3,63,601	42.67	Lost	-2,31,378	-27.15

=== Rajya Sabha ===
Position	Party	Constituency	From	To	Tenure
Member of Parliament, Rajya Sabha (1st Term)	DMDK	Tamil Nadu	3 April 2026	Incumbent	168 days
