= M. Selvaraj =

Indian politician

M. Selvaraj was an Indian politician and former Member of the Legislative Assembly of Tamil Nadu. He was elected to the Tamil Nadu legislative assembly from Vridhachalam constituency as an Independent candidate in 1957 election, and as a Dravida Munnetra Kazhagam candidate in 1971 election, and as a Dravida Munnetra Kazhagam candidate from Kurinjipadi constituency in 1977 election.
