= R. Thiyagarajan =

Indian politician

R. Thiyagarajan was an Indian politician and former Member of the Legislative Assembly of Tamil Nadu. He was elected to the Tamil Nadu legislative assembly as an Indian National Congress candidate from Vridhachalam constituency in 1984, 1989 elections.
