= R. Radhakrishnan (INC politician) =

Indian politician

Member of the Tamil Nadu Legislative Assembly
- In office 2 May 2021 – 4 May 2026
- Preceded by: V. T. Kalaiselvan
- Succeeded by: Premalatha Vijayakanth
- Constituency: Virudhachalam

Personal details
- Party: Indian National Congress

R. Radhakrishnan is an Indian politician who is a Member of Legislative Assembly of Tamil Nadu. He was elected from Virudhachalam as an Indian National Congress candidate in 2021.

== Elections contested ==
Election	Constituency	Party	Result	Vote %	Runner-up	Runner-up Party	Runner-up vote %
2021 Tamil Nadu Legislative Assembly election	Virudhachalam	INC	Won	39.17%	J. Karthikeyan	PMK	38.73%
