= P. R. Seenivasa Padayachi =

Indian politician

P. R. Seenivasa Padayachi was an Indian politician and former Member of the Legislative Assembly of Tamil Nadu. He was elected to the Tamil Nadu legislative assembly as an Indian National Congress candidate from Cuddalore constituency in 1957 and 1962 elections.
