= Virudhachalam Assembly constituency =

One of the 234 State Legislative Assembly Constituencies in Tamil Nadu in India

Coordinates: 11.50°N 79.33°E

Vriddhachalam
- Constituency No. 152 for the Tamil Nadu Legislative Assembly

Constituency details
- Country: India
- Region: South India
- State: Tamil Nadu
- District: Cuddalore
- Lok Sabha constituency: Cuddalore
- Established: 1951
- Total electors: 240,844
- Reservation: None

Member of Legislative Assembly
- 17th Tamil Nadu Legislative Assembly
- Incumbent Premallatha Vijayakant
- Party: DMDK
- Alliance: SPA
- Elected year: 2026

Vridhachalam is a legislative assembly constituency in Cuddalore district in the Indian state of Tamil Nadu. Before the 2008 delimitation, it was part of Chidambaram Lok Sabha constituency. Since 2008, it has been a part of Cuddalore Lok Sabha constituency. This constituency was won by popular actor Vijaykanth, during the 2006 Assembly election, under his new party Desiya Murpokku Dravida Kazhagam. It is one of the 234 State Legislative Assembly Constituencies in Tamil Nadu.

== Members of Legislative Assembly ==
Year	Member	Party
Madras State
1952	Kathimuthu	Tamil Nadu Toilers' Party
1952	Paramasivam	Tamil Nadu Toilers' Party
1957	M. Selvaraj	Independent
1962	G. Bhuvaraghan	Indian National Congress
1967	G. Bhuvaraghan	Indian National Congress
Tamil Nadu
1971	M. Selvaraj	Dravida Munnetra Kazhagam
1977	C. Ramanathan	All India Anna Dravida Munnetra Kazhagam
1980	R. Thiyagarajan	Indian National Congress
1984	R. Thiyagarajan	Indian National Congress
1989	G. Bhuvaraghan	Janata Party
1991	R. D. Aranganathan	All India Anna Dravida Munnetra Kazhagam
1996	Kuzhandai Tamizharasan	Dravida Munnetra Kazhagam
2001	R. Govindasamy	Pattali Makkal Katchi
2006	Vijayakanth	Desiya Murpokku Dravida Kazhagam
2011	V. Muthukumar	Desiya Murpokku Dravida Kazhagam
2016	V. T. Kalaiselvan	All India Anna Dravida Munnetra Kazhagam
2021	R. Radhakrishnan	Indian National Congress
2026	Premalatha Vijayakanth	Desiya Murpokku Dravida Kazhagam

== Election results ==
Vote share of winning candidates
2026	33.15%
2021	39.17%
2016	39.22%
2011	46.06%
2006	40.42%
2001	50.13%
1996	37.42%
1991	45.05%
1989	35.47%
1984	57.33%
1980	51.86%
1977	39.59%
1971	54.26%
1967	54.77%
1962	44.42%
1957	29.11%
1952	22.85%

=== 2026 ===
2026 Tamil Nadu Legislative Assembly election: Vridhachalam
Party	Candidate	Votes	%	±%
DMDK	Premalatha Vijayakant	69,351	33.15	▲19.98
TVK	Vijay.S	66,964	32.01	New
PMK	Dr.Tamizharasi.P	59,791	28.58	▼10.15
NTK	Ananthi Dhandapani	6,047	2.89	▼1.50
NOTA	NOTA	755	0.36	▼0.30
Margin of victory		2,387	1.14	▲0.70
Turnout		2,09,186	86.86	▲9.05
Registered electors		2,40,844		▼12,000
DMDK gain from INC		Swing	▲19.98	

=== 2021 ===
2021 Tamil Nadu Legislative Assembly election: Vriddhachalam
Party	Candidate	Votes	%	±%
INC	R. Radhakrishnan	77,064	39.17	New
PMK	J. Karthikeyan	76,202	38.73	+22.88
DMDK	Premalatha Vijayakanth	25,908	13.17	+3.14
NTK	N. Amutha	8,642	4.39	New
Margin of victory		862	0.44	−7.00
Turnout		196,734	77.81	−2.08
Rejected ballots		387	0.20	
Registered electors		252,844		
INC gain from AIADMK		Swing	-0.05	

=== 2016 ===
2016 Tamil Nadu Legislative Assembly election: Vriddhachalam
Party	Candidate	Votes	%	±%
AIADMK	V. T. Kalaiselvan	72,611	39.22	New
DMK	P. Govindasamy	58,834	31.78	New
PMK	Dr. P. Tamizharasi	29,340	15.85	New
DMDK	V. Muthukumar	18,563	10.03	−36.03
NOTA	NOTA	2,255	1.22	New
Margin of victory		13,777	7.44	−1.18
Turnout		185,125	79.88	−0.91
Registered electors		231,740		
AIADMK gain from DMDK		Swing	-6.83	

=== 2011 ===
2011 Tamil Nadu Legislative Assembly election: Vriddhachalam
Party	Candidate	Votes	%	±%
DMDK	V. Muthukumar	72,902	46.06	+5.63
INC	T. Neethirajan	59,261	37.44	New
IJK	R. Krishnamoorthy	11,214	7.08	New
Independent	K. Rajendiran	5,640	3.56	New
Independent	S. Santhanamoorthi	2,907	1.84	New
BJP	A. Pazhamalai	2,614	1.65	+0.82
BSP	K. Arutselvan	1,437	0.91	New
Independent	A. Sulochana Ayyasamy	1,216	0.77	New
Independent	R. Arunkumar	1,097	0.69	New
Margin of victory		13,641	8.62	−0.46
Turnout		158,288	80.80	3.82
Registered electors		195,908		
DMDK hold		Swing	5.63	

=== 2006 ===
2006 Tamil Nadu Legislative Assembly election: Vriddhachalam
Party	Candidate	Votes	%	±%
DMDK	A. Vijayakanth	61,337	40.42	New
PMK	R. Govindasamy	47,560	31.34	−18.79
AIADMK	R. Kasinathan	35,876	23.64	New
BJP	V. Aravind	1,265	0.83	New
Independent	C. Vijayakanth	1,174	0.77	New
SP	K. Mangapillai	878	0.58	New
Independent	K. Vijayakanth	832	0.55	New
Margin of victory		13,777	9.08	3.89
Turnout		151,731	76.98	9.09
Registered electors		197,117		
DMDK gain from PMK		Swing	-9.71	

=== 2001 ===
2001 Tamil Nadu Legislative Assembly election: Vriddhachalam
Party	Candidate	Votes	%	±%
PMK	Dr. R. Govindasamy	68,905	50.13	+17.96
DMK	Kuzhandai Tamizharasan	61,777	44.95	+7.53
MDMK	G. Vengadasalabthi	1,657	1.21	−2.87
Independent	G. Jayabalan	1,650	1.20	New
BSP	Pon. Nagappan	1,230	0.89	New
Independent	T. Senthilkumar	1,011	0.74	New
Margin of victory		7,128	5.19	−0.06
Turnout		137,440	67.88	−5.59
Registered electors		202,466		
PMK gain from DMK		Swing	12.71	

=== 1996 ===
1996 Tamil Nadu Legislative Assembly election: Vriddhachalam
Party	Candidate	Votes	%	±%
DMK	Kuzhandai Tamizharasan	49,103	37.42	+16.75
PMK	R. Govindasamy	42,218	32.18	New
AIADMK	C. Ramanathan	30,166	22.99	−22.06
MDMK	M. M. Srinivasan	5,349	4.08	New
Independent	A. Rajendran	2,202	1.68	New
Margin of victory		6,885	5.25	−7.16
Turnout		131,213	73.47	0.31
Registered electors		185,683		
DMK gain from AIADMK		Swing	-7.63	

=== 1991 ===
1991 Tamil Nadu Legislative Assembly election: Vriddhachalam
Party	Candidate	Votes	%	±%
AIADMK	R. D. Aranganathan	51,931	45.05	+25.2
PMK	A. Rajendiran Alias Deeran	37,634	32.65	New
DMK	M. Selvaraju	23,832	20.68	New
BSP	G. P. Purushothaman	610	0.53	New
Margin of victory		14,297	12.40	−3.22
Turnout		115,262	73.16	8.84
Registered electors		162,791		
AIADMK gain from JP		Swing	9.58	

=== 1989 ===
1989 Tamil Nadu Legislative Assembly election: Vriddhachalam
Party	Candidate	Votes	%	±%
JP	G. Bhuvaraghan	33,005	35.47	New
AIADMK	R. D. Aranganathan	18,469	19.85	New
Independent	Pon. Nagappan	17,702	19.03	New
INC	R. Thiyagarajan	12,148	13.06	−44.27
Independent	D. Kuppusamy	7,109	7.64	New
Independent	G. Chakrapani	1,612	1.73	New
India Farmers and Tailers Party	P. Thirunavukkarasu	1,095	1.18	New
Margin of victory		14,536	15.62	−3.71
Turnout		93,044	64.33	−13.05
Registered electors		148,003		
JP gain from INC		Swing	-21.86	

=== 1984 ===
1984 Tamil Nadu Legislative Assembly election: Vriddhachalam
Party	Candidate	Votes	%	±%
INC	R. Thiyagarajan	53,731	57.33	+5.47
DMK	D. Rasavelu	35,609	37.99	New
Independent	C. Ramanathan	3,565	3.80	New
Independent	A. Gnanamuthu	816	0.87	New
Margin of victory		18,122	19.34	14.60
Turnout		93,721	77.38	5.85
Registered electors		126,745		
INC hold		Swing	5.47	

=== 1980 ===
1980 Tamil Nadu Legislative Assembly election: Vriddhachalam
Party	Candidate	Votes	%	±%
INC	R. Thiyagarajan	45,382	51.86	+38.7
AIADMK	C. Ramanathan	41,234	47.12	+7.53
Independent	E. Ramachandran	894	1.02	New
Margin of victory		4,148	4.74	−11.14
Turnout		87,510	71.53	9.25
Registered electors		124,287		
INC gain from AIADMK		Swing	12.27	

=== 1977 ===
1977 Tamil Nadu Legislative Assembly election: Vriddhachalam
Party	Candidate	Votes	%	±%
AIADMK	C. Ramanathan	30,178	39.59	New
DMK	K. Ramalingam	18,071	23.71	−30.55
JP	T. Vaihundam	10,650	13.97	New
INC	R. Sivaprakasan	10,028	13.16	−31.84
Independent	R. V. Vaithiyanathan	3,529	4.63	New
Independent	V. Rajavanniyan	1,289	1.69	New
Independent	C. Thambuswamy	1,272	1.67	New
Independent	K. Kantharajan	1,208	1.58	New
Margin of victory		12,107	15.88	6.61
Turnout		76,225	62.28	−15.38
Registered electors		124,327		
AIADMK gain from DMK		Swing	-14.67	

=== 1971 ===
1971 Tamil Nadu Legislative Assembly election: Vriddhachalam
Party	Candidate	Votes	%	±%
DMK	M. Selvaraj	42,132	54.26	+10.99
INC	B. Thiyagarajan	34,934	44.99	−9.78
Independent	R. Krishanasami	579	0.75	New
Margin of victory		7,198	9.27	−2.23
Turnout		77,645	77.65	−5.87
Registered electors		103,130		
DMK gain from INC		Swing	-0.51	

=== 1967 ===
1967 Madras Legislative Assembly election: Vriddhachalam
Party	Candidate	Votes	%	±%
INC	G. Boovaraghan	42,230	54.77	+10.36
DMK	M. Selvaraj	33,363	43.27	+1.9
Independent	M. Mouchi	826	1.07	New
Independent	A. Mangan	681	0.88	New
Margin of victory		8,867	11.50	8.45
Turnout		77,100	83.52	13.00
Registered electors		95,725		
INC hold		Swing	10.36	

=== 1962 ===
1962 Madras Legislative Assembly election: Vriddhachalam
Party	Candidate	Votes	%	±%
INC	G. Boovaraghan	26,990	44.42	+17.49
DMK	M. Selvaraj	25,138	41.37	New
CPI	K. Kaliaperumal	3,767	6.20	−7.7
Independent	P. N. Sarguru	3,018	4.97	New
TNP	D. Namachivoyam	1,851	3.05	New
Margin of victory		1,852	3.05	0.87
Turnout		60,764	70.52	20.92
Registered electors		90,021		
INC gain from Independent		Swing	15.31	

=== 1957 ===
1957 Madras Legislative Assembly election: Vriddhachalam
Party	Candidate	Votes	%	±%
Independent	M. Selvaraj	11,189	29.11	New
INC	G. Rajavelu Padyachri	10,350	26.93	+5.05
CPI	Ayyasamy Koundan	5,343	13.90	New
Independent	Paramasivam	4,331	11.27	New
Independent	P. N. Sarguru	3,333	8.67	New
Independent	Veerasamy Padayachi	2,384	6.20	New
Independent	P. Kaliaperumal	1,510	3.93	New
Margin of victory		839	2.18	1.20
Turnout		38,440	49.60	−42.30
Registered electors		77,496		
Independent gain from TTP		Swing	6.26	

=== 1952 ===
1952 Madras Legislative Assembly election: Vriddhachalam
Party	Candidate	Votes	%	±%
TTP	Paramasivam	30,302	22.85	New
INC	Narayanaswamy Pillai	29,004	21.87	New
TTP	Kathimuthu	24,880	18.76	New
INC	Vedamanikkam	22,800	17.19	New
Independent	Kadirvelu Padayachi	6,401	4.83	New
Independent	C. Krishnaswami Rao	5,738	4.33	New
Independent	Krishnan	5,493	4.14	New
Independent	Suthari	4,749	3.58	New
Independent	Lakshmanan	3,236	2.44	New
Margin of victory		1,298	0.98	
Turnout		132,603	91.90	
Registered electors		144,294		
TTP win (new seat)				
