= M. Thamimun Ansari =

Indian politician

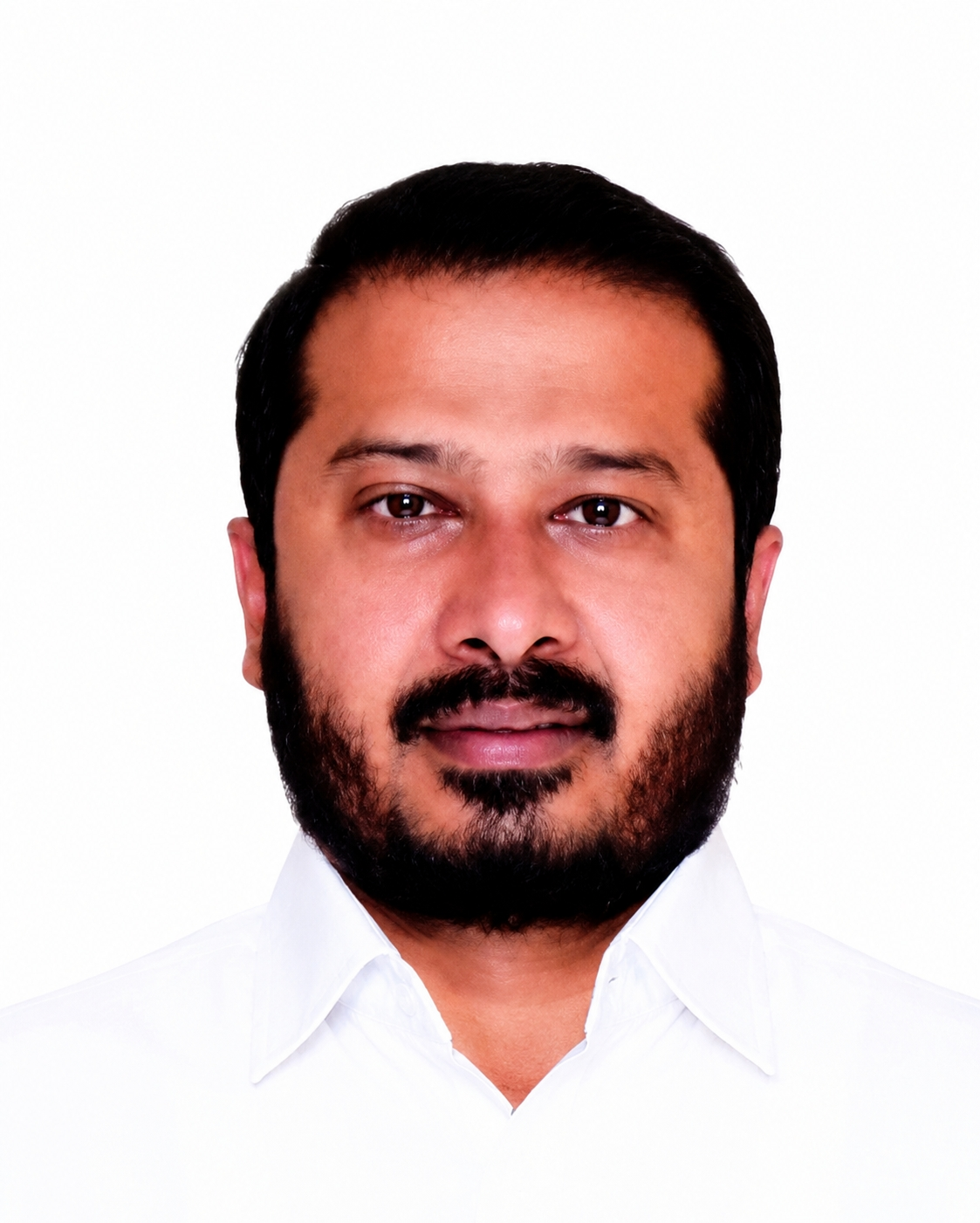
- Photo for Assembly election in 2026

Member of the Tamil Nadu Legislative Assembly
- Incumbent
- Assumed office 11 May 2026
- Preceded by: K. A. Pandian
- Constituency: Chidambaram
- Majority: 5,747 (2.93%)
- In office 24 May 2016 – 2 May 2021
- Preceded by: K. A. Jayapal
- Constituency: Nagapattinam
- Majority: 20,550 (15.29%)

Personal details
- Resting place: 26, Kasi Street, Thopputhurai, Vedaranyam, Nagapattinam, TN
- Party: Manithaneya Jananayaga Katchi
- Parent: Mohamed Ali (father)
- Education: B.A., & M.A.(Political Science),
- Alma mater: The New College & Annamalai University

M. Thamimun Ansari is an Indian politician belonging to Manithaneya Jananayaga Katchi (MJK). He is also General Secretary of the party. He has contested and was elected as MLA of Nagapattinam in Tamil Nadu Legislative Assembly in 2016 as an AIADMK candidate and also elected as Chidambaram in 2026 as an Dravida Munnetra Kazhagam candidate.

== Elections contested ==
Election	Constituency	Party	Result	Vote %	Runner-up/ Winner	Runner-up/ Winner Party	Runner-up/ Winner vote %	Ref
2026	Chidambaram	DMK	Won	35.48%	K. A. Pandian	AIADMK	32.55%	
2016	Nagapattinam	AIADMK	Won	48.28%	A. Mohamed Jafarullah	MMK	32.99%	
2011	Chepauk-Thiruvallikeni	MMK	Loss	42.35%	J. Anbazhagan	DMK	49.44%	
