= K. Balakrishnan (Tamil Nadu politician) =

Indian politician

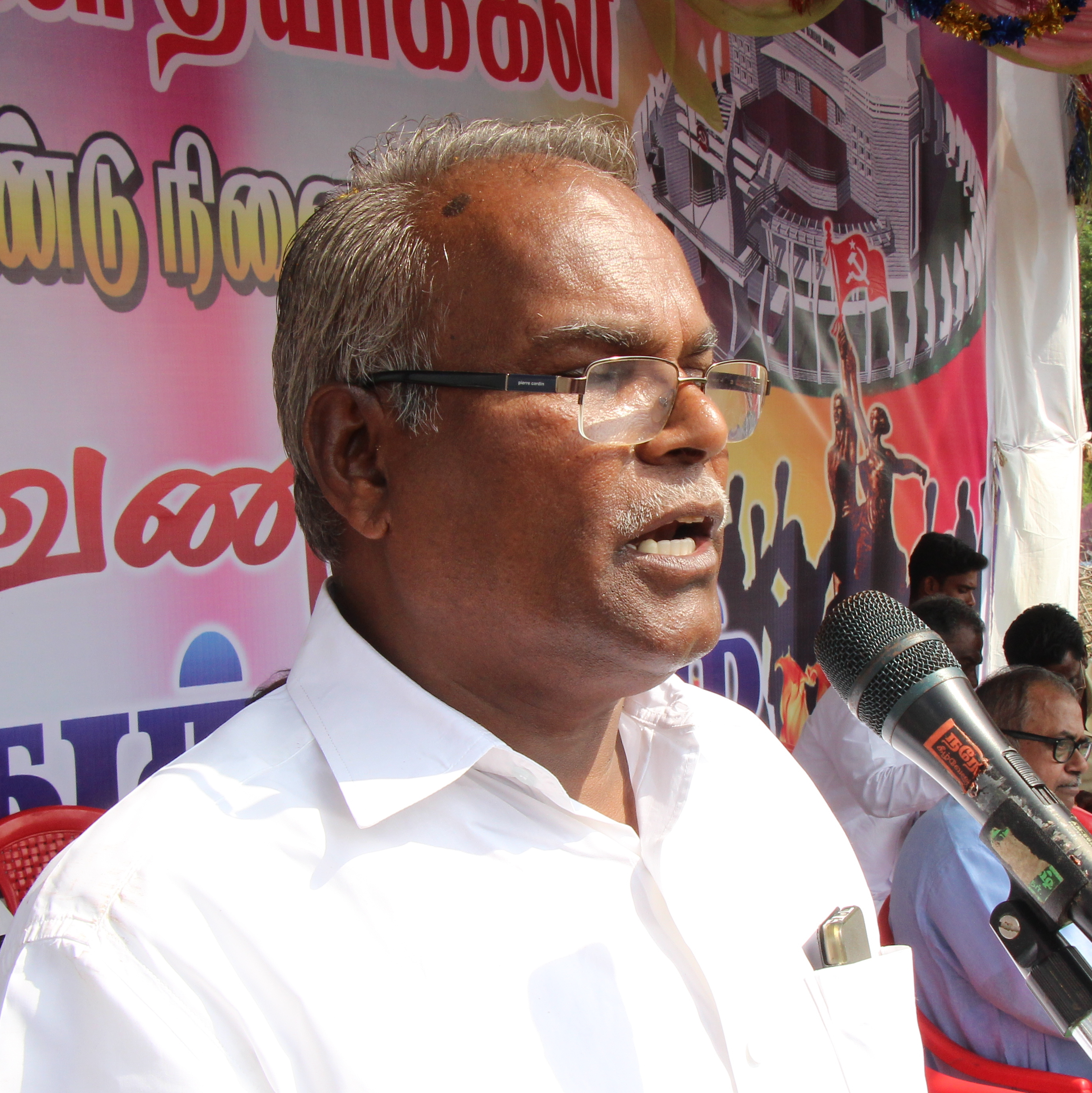

Member of the Tamil Nadu Legislative Assembly
- In office 16 May 2011 – 22 May 2016
- Preceded by: A. Arunmozhithevan
- Succeeded by: K. A. Pandian
- Constituency: Chidambaram

Secretary, Communist Party of India (Marxist) — Tamil Nadu State Committee
- In office 20 February 2018 – 5 January 2025
- Preceded by: G. Ramakrishnan
- Succeeded by: P. Shanmugam

Personal details
- Born: Kannan. Balakrishnan; 5 February 1953 (age 73) Annamalai Nagar, Madras State, India
- Party: Communist Party of India (Marxist)
- Spouse: Jansirani
- Parent(s): Father : Kannan; Mother : Muthulakshmi
- Occupation: Politician

Kannan Balakrishnan is an Indian politician and a former member of the Tamil Nadu Legislative Assembly from the Chidambaram constituency. He represents the Communist Party of India (Marxist). He is a former Secretary of CPI(M) Tamil Nadu.

From his college days at Annamalai University, he was involved in politics and is continuously fighting against injustice and working for people's welfare.

On 2 September 2015, Balakrishnan was arrested for refusing to call off a protest at a train station as part of a strike. He later complained of uneasiness and was taken to the Rajah Muthiah Medical College and Hospital at Chidambaram where he was treated for his illness. He served as the State Secretary of CPI(M) Tamil Nadu from February 21, 2018 to January 5, 2025.
