= K. S. Alagiri =

Indian politician

President of the Tamil Nadu Congress Committee
- In office February 2019 – February 2024
- National President: Rahul Gandhi; Sonia Gandhi (interim); Mallikarjun Kharge
- Preceded by: Su. Thirunavukkarasar
- Succeeded by: K. Selvaperunthagai

Member of Parliament, Lok Sabha
- In office 16 May 2009 – 16 May 2014
- Preceded by: K. Venkatapathy
- Succeeded by: A. Arunmozhithevan
- Constituency: Cuddalore

Member of The Tamil Nadu Legislative Assembly
- In office 1991–2001
- Preceded by: Krishnamoorthy D.
- Succeeded by: Saravanan Durai K.
- Constituency: Chidambaram

Personal details
- Born: 22 October 1952 (age 73)
- Party: Indian National Congress (2002–present)
- Other political affiliations: Tamil Maanila Congress (1996–2002)
- Children: 1
- Education: Annamalai University
- Occupation: Politician

K S Alagiri is an Indian politician representing the party Indian National Congress. He was the president of Tamil Nadu Congress party from 2019 to 2024. and an ex-member of the Parliament of India from Cuddalore Constituency. Previously, he was elected to the Tamil Nadu legislative assembly as an Indian National Congress candidate from Chidambaram constituency in 1991 election, and as a Tamil Maanila Congress candidate in 1996 election.

== Personal life ==
He was hospitalized on July 28, 2023, after he fell down and got injured during a walking session.

== Early life ==
He was born in 1952. He graduated from Annamalai University, Chidambaram and is a native of Cuddalore district in North Tamil Nadu.

== Political career ==
In November 2022, there was a rebellion against K. S. Alagiri by TNCC party leaders seeking replacement of Alagiri's term as the party president. The leaders met Congress president Mallikarjun Kharge and complained about Alagiri's functioning methods and not countering the BJP in the state adequately.

== Positions held ==
- State President – Tamil Nadu Congress Committee [Feb 2019–Feb 2024]
- Member of Parliament of India (2009–2014)
- Member of Legislative Assembly of Tamil Nadu (1991–2001)

== Electoral performance ==
=== Lok Sabha elections ===
Year	Election	Party	PC name	Result	Votes gained	Vote share(%)
2009	15th Lok Sabha	Indian National Congress	Cuddalore	Won	320,473	42.76%
2014	16th Lok Sabha	Indian National Congress	Cuddalore	Lost	26,650	2.71%

=== Assembly elections ===
Election	Constituency	Party	Result	Vote %	Runner-up	Runner-up Party	Runner-up vote %	Ref.
1996 Tamil Nadu Legislative Assembly election	Chidambaram	Tamil Maanila Congress	Won	50.52%	A. Radhakrishnan	Indian National Congress	22.37%	
1991 Tamil Nadu Legislative Assembly election	Chidambaram	Indian National Congress	Won	51.2%	M. R. K. Panneerselvam	DMK	30.57%	
