= G. Veeraiyan =

Indian politician

G. Veeraiyan is an Indian politician and former Member of the Legislative Assembly of Tamil Nadu.

== Biography ==
He was elected to the Tamil Nadu legislative assembly as a Communist Party of India (Marxist) candidate from Nagapattinam constituency in 1984 and 1989 elections.
