= Ere. Elamvazhuthi =

Indian politician

- Born: Erengasamy Elamvazhuthi; 25 September 1925; Sangolikuppam, Cuddalore, Tamil Nadu
- Died: 22 October 1970 (aged 45); Cuddalore, Tamil Nadu
- Occupation: Politician
- Spouses: Visalatchi, Annapoorani
- Children: Megala; E. Pugazhendi; Udhayarani; Kalaiarasi; Malathi; Pannir Selvam
- Relatives: Vetrimaaran (maternal grandson)

Erengasamy Elamvazhuthi (born 25 September 1925) was a Member of Legislative Assembly (MLA) from the Cuddalore constituency of Tamil Nadu from 1967 to 1970 representing Dravida Munnetra Kazhagam (DMK).

== Early life ==
He was born in Sangolikuppam, a village near Cuddalore to Rengasamy and Soundharam. He was closer to Periyar EV Ramasamy and CN Annadurai and got himself renamed as Elamvazhuthi from his original Dhandapani due to his unrelenting belief and support for the Dravidian principles. He was a staunch rationalist though his father used to do priestly duties at Sangolikuppam.

== Education ==
He had his schooling in St.Joseph's College, Cuddalore. He had his undergraduate and postgraduate studies at Annamalai University and studied Law at the Law College, Chennai.

== Personal life ==
He was married to Visalatchi and later to Annapoorani as his first wife met with an accident and died in Kurinjipadi. He was so fond of Tamil that he named his children Mekala, E. Pugazhendi, Udhayarani, Kalaiarasi, Malathy and Pannir Selvam.

== Politics ==
He was a reputed lawyer and a great orator, both in Tamil and English. He was felicitated by CN Annadurai when he became a lawyer, by publishing his photo on the first page of Dravida Nadu, a journal run by CN Annadurai himself who later fondly called him "Black Prince". He was fully involved in the anti Hindi agitations called by the Dravidian leaders and went to prison thrice. As an MLA or otherwise, Cuddalore was close to his heart and he toiled to bring it up by helping in the infrastructure development and helping people from all walks of life.

== Death ==
He met with an untimely death on 22 October 1970 due to a heart attack. When this news was broken, the Chief Minister M Karunanidhi, a close friend of Elamvazhuthi, cancelled all his programmes on his way to Trichy and returned from Virudhachalam to Cuddalore.

His wife, who he renamed fondly Selvi, lives in Cuddalore in the house built by him.
