= K. A. Pandian =

Indian politician

- Photo for Assembly election in 2021

Member of the Tamil Nadu Legislative Assembly
- In office 16 May 2016 – 4 May 2026
- Preceded by: K. Balakrishnan
- Succeeded by: Thamimum Ansari
- Constituency: Chidambaram

Personal details
- Born: 30 April 1958 (age 68) Kumaratchi, Madras State, India (present-day Cuddalore, Tamil Nadu)
- Party: All India Anna Dravida Munnetra Kazhagam
- Parent: V. Arigovindan (father)

K. Arigovindan Pandian is an Indian politician who is a Member of Legislative Assembly of Tamil Nadu. He was elected from Chidambaram as an All India Anna Dravida Munnetra Kazhagam candidate in 2016 and 2021.

== Elections contested ==
Election	Constituency	Party	Result	Vote %	Runner-up	Runner-up Party	Runner-up vote %	Ref
2021 Tamil Nadu Legislative Assembly election	Chidambaram	ADMK	Won	50.49%	S. Abdul Rahman	IUML	41.19%	
2016 Tamil Nadu Legislative Assembly election	Chidambaram	ADMK	Won	34.31%	K. R. Senthilkumar	DMK	33.43%	
