= G. Vagheesam Pillai =

Indian politician

G. Vagheesam Pillai was an Indian politician and former Member of the Legislative Assembly of Tamil Nadu. He was elected to the Tamil Nadu Legislative Assembly as an Indian National Congress candidate from Chidambaram Assembly Constituency in 1952 and 1957 elections. Swami Sahajananda from Congress party was the second winner in both elections.

Born on 1 September 1915, he was survived by four sons and two daughters. Lord Nataraja Temple Kumbabishekam was done under his leadership in February, 1988.
