= Premalatha Vijayakanth =

Indian politician

General secretary of Desiya Murpokku Dravida Kazhagam
- Incumbent
- Assumed office 14 December 2023
- Preceded by: R. Radhakrishnan

Member of the Tamil Nadu Legislative Assembly
- Incumbent
- Assumed office 6 May 2026
- Preceded by: R. Radhakrishnan
- Constituency: Virudhachalam

Personal details
- Born: 18 March 1969 (age 57) Ambur, Tamil Nadu, India
- Party: Desiya Murpokku Dravida Kazhagam
- Spouse: Vijayakanth (m. 1990; died 2023)
- Children: Vijaya Prabhakaran; Shanmuga Pandian
- Relatives: L. K. Sudhish (brother)
- Education: Auxilium College, Katpadi (B.A. in English Literature)
- Occupation: Politician, Agriculture/Public Service

Premalatha Vijayakanth (born 18 March 1969) is an Indian politician from Tamil Nadu. She is the General Secretary of the Desiya Murpokku Dravida Kazhagam. She is a member of the Tamil Nadu Legislative Assembly representing Virudhachalam Assembly constituency.

== Personal life ==
Premalatha was born in Ambur, Vellore district, Tamil Nadu. Her father Kannaiah was a manager in a sugar factory while her mother Hamsaveni is a housewife. She did her graduation in English literature. She married actor Vijayakanth in 1990 and together they have two sons, Vijay Prabhakar and Shanmuga Pandian.

== Political career ==
Premalatha became an MLA for the time winning the 2026 Tamil Nadu Legislative Assembly election from Virudhachalam Assembly constituency representing Desiya Murpokku Dravida Kazhagam. She polled 69,351 votes and defeated her nearest rival, Vijay S. of Tamilaga Vettri Kazhagam, by a margin of 2,387 votes.
