= T. R. V. S. Ramesh =

Indian politician

Member of Parliament, Lok Sabha
- In office 23 May 2019 – 4 June 2024
- Preceded by: A. Arunmozhithevan
- Succeeded by: M. K. Vishnu Prasad
- Constituency: Cuddalore, Tamil Nadu

Personal details
- Born: 9 November 1970 (age 55)
- Party: Dravida Munnetra Kazhagam

T. R. V. S. Ramesh is an Indian politician. He was elected to the Lok Sabha, the lower house of the Parliament of India, from Cuddalore, Tamil Nadu in the 2019 Indian general election as member of the Dravida Munnetra Kazhagam.
