= G. Bhuvaraghan =

Indian politician

G. Bhuvaraghan (c. 1927 – 23 February 2014) was an Indian politician and Member of the Legislative Assembly of Tamil Nadu. He was elected to the Tamil Nadu legislative assembly as an Indian National Congress candidate from the Vridhachalam constituency in 1962, 1967 elections and as a Janata Party candidate in the 1989 election.
