= Adhi Sankar =

Indian politician

Adhi Shankar
- Constituency: Kallakurichi (Lok Sabha constituency), Tamil Nadu

Personal details
- Born: 7 March 1957 (age 69) Tirukoilur, Tamil Nadu, India
- Party: Dravida Munnetra Kazhagam
- Spouse: Smt. Anjugam
- Children: 2
- Education: Madras University
- Profession: Advocate
- As of 2 January, 2017

Adhi Sankar is an Indian politician and former member of the Parliament of India from Kallakurichi Constituency. He represents the Dravida Munnetra Kazhagam party.
