= E. Pugazhendi =

Indian politician

E. Pugazhendi is an Indian politician and former Member of the Legislative Assembly of Tamil Nadu. He was elected to the Tamil Nadu legislative assembly as a Dravida Munnetra Kazhagam candidate from Cuddalore constituency in 1989, 1996 and 2001 elections. His father Ere. Elamvazhuthi was also a DMK politician.
