= Desiya Murpokku Dravida Kazhagam =

Indian political party

- Abbreviation: DMDK
- General Secretary: Premallatha Vijayakant
- Rajya Sabha Leader: L. K. Sushish
- Treasurer: L. K. Sudhish
- Founder: Vijayakant
- Founded: 14 September 2005; 20 years ago
- Headquarters: Captain Aalayam, 125/7, Jawaharlal Nehru Salai, Koyambedu, Chennai – 600107, Tamil Nadu, India.
- Student wing: DMDK Student Wing
- Youth wing: DMDK Youth Wing
- Women's wing: DMDK Women's Wing
- Labour wing: Desiya Murpokku Union Federation
- Ideology: Populism; Secularism; Dravidianism; Social democracy
- Colours: Yellow
- ECI Status: State party
- Alliance: Regional Alliances SPA (since 2026); Former Alliances: AIADMK+ (2011–2012; 2019–2021; 2024–2026) (Tamil Nadu); AMMK+ (2021) (Tamil Nadu); NDA (2014–2016; 2019–2021); People's Welfare Front (2016) (Tamil Nadu)
- Seats in Rajya Sabha: 1 / 245
- Seats in Lok Sabha: 0 / 543
- Seats in Tamil Nadu Legislative Assembly: 1 / 234
- Number of states and union territories in government: 0 / 31

Election symbol

Website
- www.dmdkparty.com

The Desiya Murpokku Dravida Kazhagam (DMDK; transl. National Progressive Dravidian Federation) is an Indian regional political party in the state of Tamil Nadu. It is a Dravidian party founded by the former leader of the opposition in the Tamil Nadu Legislative Assembly Vijayakant at Madurai on 14 September 2005. The party was led by its founder until 14 December 2023 from its date of founding. From 14 December 2023, the DMDK is led by Vijayakant's wife Premallatha Vijayakant as general secretary of the party. The party served as the main opposition party in the Tamil Nadu Legislative Assembly from 27 May 2011 to 21 February 2016. The headquarters of the party is called Captain Aalayam, which is located at Jawaharlal Nehru Salai, Koyambedu, Chennai.

== History ==
=== Vijayakant era (2005–23) ===
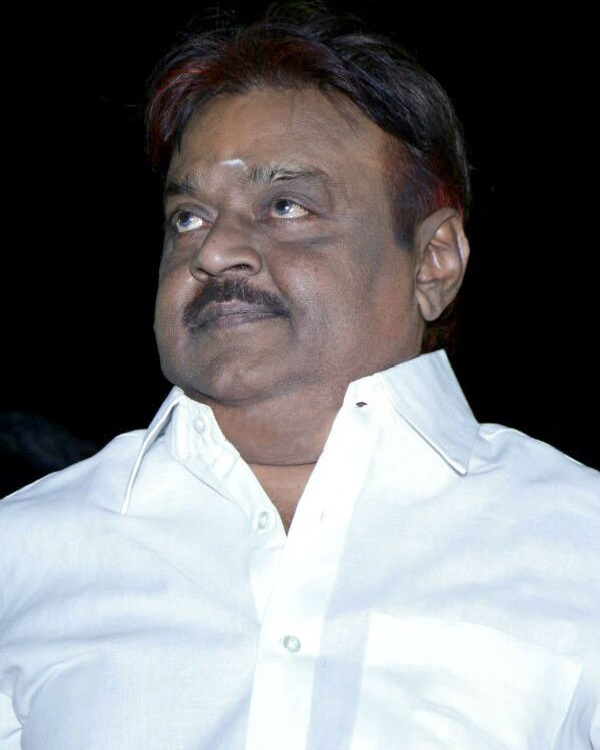
Dr. Vijayakanth
Founder of the party

The party was founded on 14 September 2005, as Desiya Murpokku Dravida Kazhagam (DMDK) by the former leader of the opposition in the Tamil Nadu Legislative Assembly Vijayakant, a veteran Tamil film star and popular politician. He assumed the responsibility of the founder-president of the party. Ramu Vasanthan, who was the state president of the fans' forum, took charge as the general secretary of the party. On 17 July 2009, he died of a cardiac arrest. In 2014, the party's founder-president, Vijayakant, took over the position that had previously been vacant.

In the 2006 assembly election, the party contested all 234 seats without an alliance and bagged only one seat with 8.38% of the vote, that of its founder-president Vijayakant from Vriddhachalam constituency, who served as a member of the Tamil Nadu Legislative Assembly. Other candidates of this party who contested in other constituencies in this election failed.

In the 2009 general election, it contested 40 seats—39 in Tamil Nadu and one in Puducherry—without an alliance and lost in all the constituencies with 0.75% of the vote.

Following widespread corruption, a price rise, a power cut, and allegations of nepotism against the Dravida Munnetra Kazhagam government, in the 2011 assembly election, the party, in alliance with parties like the left and former chief minister of Tamil Nadu J. Jayalalithaa's All India Anna Dravida Munnetra Kazhagam (AIADMK), swept the polls, winning 202 seats, with the DMDK winning 29 out of 40 which it contested, and got the opposition status in the Tamil Nadu Legislative Assembly by making it a second largest party in the legislative assembly next only to its ally AIADMK pushing DMK to third position and Vijayakanth recognized as the leader of the opposition in the assembly. The large victory also earned recognition and a permanent election symbol Nagara from the Election Commission of India. Vijayakanth stepped down as leader of the opposition on 21 February 2016, after eight DMDK party MLAs resigned.

The party's performance began to deteriorate after the 2014 general election; it fought the Lok Sabha election in an alliance with the Bharatiya Janata Party-led National Democratic Alliance (NDA). Marumalarchi Dravida Munnetra Kazhagam, Pattali Makkal Katchi, and Kongunadu Makkal Desiya Katchi and Indhiya Jananayaga Katchi's Social Democratic Alliance are the other allies of the National Democratic Alliance in Tamil Nadu. In the NDA alliance, the party had the highest number of seats, which were 14 in number. Despite the big hype, the party lost all 14 seats to AIADMK candidates. But it was the first time in 52 years that the DMK alliance was pushed to third place by the number of seats, and this election gave confidence to most parties that the future of Tamil Nadu lies in a coalition government.

The DMDK decided to run alongside the People's Welfare Front (PWA) in the 2016 Tamil Nadu Legislative Assembly election, as part of the "Captain Vijayakanth Alliance," which included the Communist Party of India (Marxist), Communist Party of India, Vaiko's Marumalarchi Dravida Munnetra Kazhagam, and Thol. Thirumavalavan's Viduthalai Chiruthaigal Katchi. The DMDK performed poorly in the election, not winning even a single constituency and losing deposits in the majority of its seats. It also witnessed a vote swing of -5.49% from the 2011 assembly elections.

In the 2019 general elections, after several rounds of talks with different political parties, The move comes after the DMDK’s attempts to make an alliance with the Dravida Munnetra Kazhagam, which has already entered into a pre-poll alliance with the Congress and several others, failed. DMDK contested with the Bharatiya Janata Party-led National Democratic Alliance (NDA) in Tamil Nadu for the 17th Lok Sabha polls, along with All India Anna Dravida Munnetra Kazhagam, Pattali Makkal Katchi, Tamil Maanila Congress (Moopanar), and some unrecognized parties. Vijayakanth wants to prove his vote bank strength in this election, but the party was humiliated and lost all four that it contested out of the 39 Lok Sabha seats in the state. The Secular Progressive Alliance (SPA), a DMK-led alliance consisting of all the major opposition parties in the state, swept the election by winning 38 seats.

In the 2021 assembly election, the DMDK, which had the support of the Amma Makkal Munnettra Kazagam, Social Democratic Party of India, and All India Majlis-e-Ittehadul Muslimeen, lost 60 seats contested and saw a vote percentage swing of -1.96% compared to previous assembly elections. After the election, the DMK emerged as the ruling party, and the AIADMK emerged as the main party of the opposition in the assembly.

On 26 December 2023, Vijayakanth was admitted to MIOT International Hospital, Chennai, due to pneumonia. After a prolonged illness, he died after testing positive for COVID-19 on 28 December 2023.

=== Premalatha Vijayakanth era (2023–present) ===
On 14 December 2023, the former leader of the opposition in the Tamil Nadu Legislative Assembly Vijayakant, announced and appointed Premalatha Vijayakanth as the general secretary of the party in the presence of the party's deputy secretaries at the General Council Meeting held in Chennai. Since Vijayakant's demise, the party is being completely led by Premalatha as the general secretary of the party.

In the 2024 general election, the DMDK joined the AIADMK-led Alliance in Tamil Nadu for the 18th Lok Sabha polls, along with Puthiya Tamilagam (PT) and the Social Democratic Party of India (SDPI). The DMDK was contested in five constituencies, including Virudhunagar, which was contested by V. Vijaya Prabhakaran, the party's founder Vijayakant and the general secretary Premalatha Vijayakanth's son. The party lost in all the constituencies it contested, and the Indian National Developmental Inclusive Alliance swept the election in Tamil Nadu.

The Desiya Murpokku Dravida Kazhagam (DMDK) has allied with the Dravida Munnetra Kazhagam (DMK) ahead of the 2026 Tamil Nadu Assembly elections.

DMDK leader Premalatha Vijayakanth confirmed the decision after meeting Chief Minister M. K. Stalin, saying it fulfilled late founder Vijayakanth’s wish.

== Electoral performance ==
=== Indian general elections ===
Lok Sabha Elections
Year	Lok Sabha	Party leader	Seats contested	Seats won	Change in seats	Percentage of votes	Vote swing	Popular vote	Outcome
2009	15th	Vijayakant	40	0 / 543	Steady	0.75%	Steady	3,126,117	Lost
2014	16th	Vijayakant	14	0 / 543	Steady	0.38%	▼0.37%	2,078,843	Lost
2019	17th	Vijayakant	4	0 / 543	Steady	0.15%	▼0.23%	929,590	Lost
2024	18th	Premallatha Vijayakant	5	0 / 543	Steady	0.17%	▲0.02%	1,128,616	Lost

=== State legislative assembly elections ===
Tamil Nadu Legislative Assembly Elections
Year	Assembly	Party leader	Seats contested	Seats won	Change in seats	Percentage of votes	Vote swing	Popular vote	Outcome
2006	13th	Vijayakant	234	1 / 234	▲1	8.38%	Steady	2,764,223	Others
2011	14th	Vijayakant	41	29 / 234	▲28	7.88%	▼0.50%	2,903,828	Opposition
2016	15th	Vijayakant	104	0 / 234	▼29	2.39%	▼5.49%	1,034,384	Lost
2021	16th	Vijayakant	60	0 / 234	Steady	0.43%	▼1.96%	200,157	Lost
2026	17th	Premallatha Vijayakant	10	1 / 234	▲1	1.20%	▲0.77%	589,500	Opposition

Puducherry Legislative Assembly Elections
Year	Assembly	Party leader	Seats contested	Seats won	Change in seats	Percentage of votes	Vote swing	Popular vote	Outcome
2006	12th	Vijayakant	24	0 / 30	Steady	2.73%	Steady	15,405	Lost
2011	13th	Vijayakant	1	0 / 30	Steady	0.85%	▼1.88%	5,966	Lost
2016	14th	Vijayakant	6	0 / 30	Steady	0.11%	▼0.74%	850	Lost
2021	15th	Vijayakant	26	0 / 30	Steady	0.30%	▲0.19%	2,524	Lost

National Capital Territory of Delhi Legislative Assembly Elections
Year	Assembly	Party leader	Seats contested	Seats won	Change in seats	Percentage of votes	Vote swing	Popular vote	Outcome
2013	5th	Vijayakant	11	0 / 70	Steady	0.03%	Steady	2,285	Lost

== Current office bearers and prominent members ==
Member	Position in government	Party position
Premallatha Vijayakant	*Member of the Legislative Assembly from Virudhachalam	General Secretary
V. Elangovan	Steady	Presidium Chairman
L. K. Sudhish	*Member of Parliament, Rajya Sabha	Treasurer
Alagaapuram R. Mohanraj	Former Deputy Leader of the Opposition in the Tamil Nadu Legislative Assembly; Former Member of the Legislative Assembly from Salem North	Propaganda Secretary
B. Parthasarathy	Former Member of the Legislative Assembly from Virugampakkam	Deputy General Secretary
Selva Anburaj	Steady	Captain Manram Secretary
V. Vijayaprabhakaran	Steady	Youth Wing Secretary
Malathi Vinoth	Steady	Women's Wing Secretary
S. Senthilkumar	Former Member of the Legislative Assembly from Thiruverumbur	Information Technology Wing Secretary
M. R. Panneerselvam	Steady	Advocates Wing Secretary
A. M. Shanmuga Sundaram	Steady	Students' Wing Secretary
K. Shanmugavel	Steady	Trade Wing Secretary
V. Meenakshisundaram	Steady	Weaver's Wing Secretary

== List of party leaders ==
=== Presidents ===
No.	Portrait	Name (Birth–Death)	Term in office		
No.	Portrait	Name (Birth–Death)	Assumed office	Left office	Time in office
1		Vijayakant (1952–2023)	14 September 2005	28 December 2023	18 years, 105 days

=== General Secretaries ===
No.	Portrait	Name (Birth–Death)	Term in office		
No.	Portrait	Name (Birth–Death)	Assumed office	Left office	Time in office
1		S. Ramu Vasanthan (1955–2009)	14 September 2005	17 July 2009	3 years, 306 days
2		Vijayakant (1952–2023)	1 June 2014	14 December 2023	9 years, 196 days
3		Premallatha Vijayakant (b. 1969)	14 December 2023	Incumbent	2 years, 199 days

== Legislative leaders ==
=== List of leaders of the opposition ===
==== Leaders of the Opposition in the Tamil Nadu Legislative Assembly ====
No.	Portrait	Name (Birth–Death)	Term in office			Assembly (Election)	Elected constituency
No.	Portrait	Name (Birth–Death)	Assumed office	Left office	Time in office	Assembly (Election)	Elected constituency
1		Vijayakant (1952–2023)	27 May 2011	21 February 2016	4 years, 270 days	14th (2011)	Rishivandiyam

=== List of deputy leaders of the opposition ===
==== Deputy Leaders of the Opposition in the Tamil Nadu Legislative Assembly ====
No.	Portrait	Name (Birth–Death)	Term in office			Assembly (Election)	Elected constituency	Leader of the Opposition
No.	Portrait	Name (Birth–Death)	Assumed office	Left office	Time in office	Assembly (Election)	Elected constituency	Leader of the Opposition
1		Panruti S. Ramachandran (b. 1937)	27 May 2011	10 December 2013	2 years, 197 days	14th (2011)	Alandur	Vijayakant
2		Alagaapuram R. Mohanraj (b. 1954)	31 January 2014	21 February 2016	2 years, 21 days	14th (2011)	Salem North	Vijayakant

== See also ==
- Politics of India
- Elections in India
- Politics of Tamil Nadu
- Elections in Tamil Nadu
- List of political parties in India
- List of political parties in Tamil Nadu
