= 2024 Indian general election in Tamil Nadu =

Elections for the 18th Lok Sabha seats in Tamil Nadu

- 19 April 2024

All 39 Tamil Nadu seats in the Lok Sabha
- Opinion polls
- Registered: 6,23,33,925
- Turnout: 69.72% (▼2.72 pp)
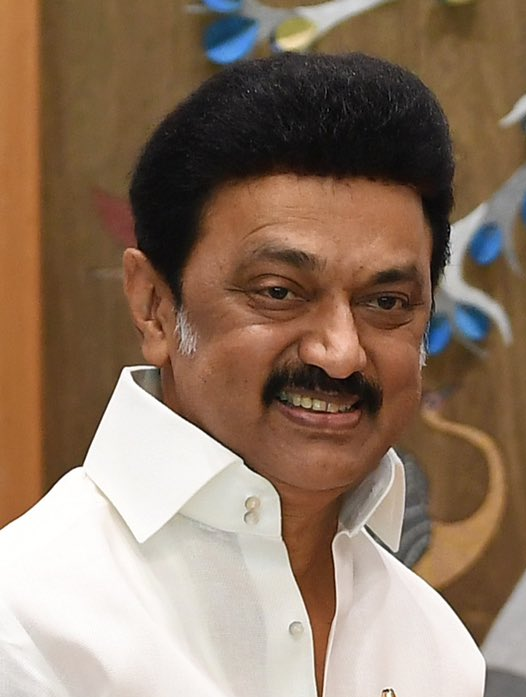

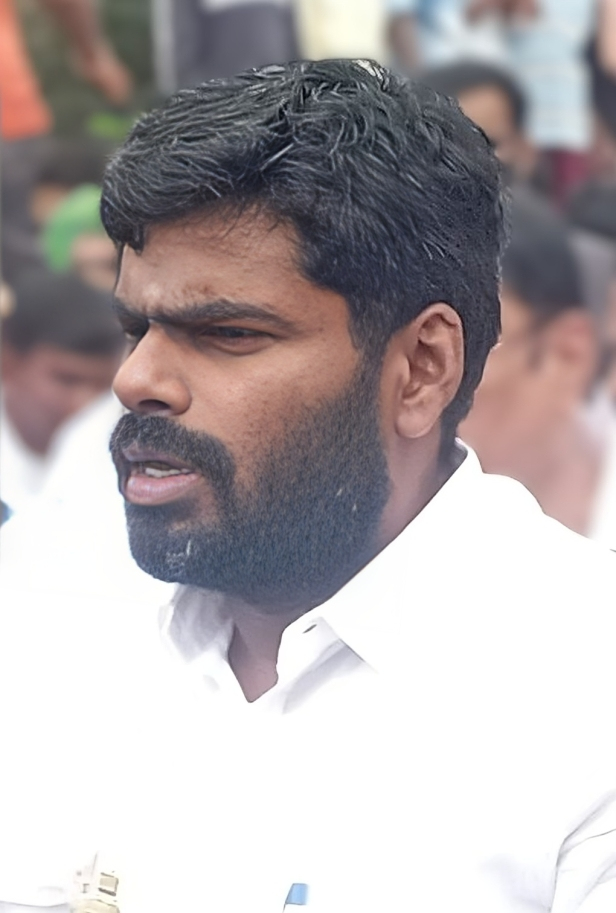
	First party	Second party	Third party
Leader	M. K. Stalin	Edappadi K. Palaniswami	K. Annamalai
Party	DMK	AIADMK	BJP
Alliance	INDIA	AIADMK+	NDA (Note: In the previous election, AIADMK and BJP were part of the same alliance)
Leader's seat	Did not contest	Did not contest	Coimbatore (Lost)
Last election	33.10%, 24 seats	19.99%, 1 seats	3.58%, 0 seats
Seats won	22	0	0
Seat change	▼2	▼1	Steady
Popular vote	1,17,54,710	89,26,508	49,18,293
Percentage	26.93%	20.44%	11.24%
Swing	▼6.19 pp	▲1.30 pp	▲7.68 pp
Alliance seats	39	0	0
Seat change	▲1	Steady	Steady
Alliance percentage	46.97%	23.05%	18.28%
Prime Minister before election
Narendra Modi
BJP
Prime Minister after election
Narendra Modi
BJP

The 2024 Indian general election was held on 19 April to elect 39 members of the 18th Lok Sabha from Tamil Nadu. The results were announced on 4 June 2024, after the voting was completed in the other parts of the country.

The Indian National Developmental Inclusive Alliance, led by the Dravida Munnetra Kazhagam in the state and the Indian National Congress nationally, won a clean sweep of all the 39 seats in the state. The National Democratic Alliance (NDA) led by the Bharatiya Janata Party, the incumbent ruling party of the union, did not win any seat in the state. The principal opposition party in the state, the All India Anna Dravida Munnetra Kazhagam, which led a separate alliance lost the sole seat (Theni) that it had won as a part of the NDA in the 2019 elections. However, the NDA secured a majority nationally, and Narendra Modi was sworn in as the Prime Minister of India for the third consecutive term.

== Background ==
General elections are held in India once in five years to elect the members of the Lok Sabha. The tenure of the 17th Lok Sabha was scheduled to end on 16 June 2024. The previous general election was held in April–May 2019, after which the National Democratic Alliance (NDA), led by the Bharatiya Janata Party (BJP), formed the union government, with Narendra Modi continuing as Prime Minister of India for a second term. However, in Tamil Nadu, the Secular Progressive Alliance led by the Dravida Munnetra Kazhagam (DMK) won 38 out of the 39 seats, and the All India Anna Dravida Munnetra Kazhagam (AIADMK), which was part of the NDA, won the lone seat of Theni.

Ahead of the 2024 elections, the DMK became part of Indian National Developmental Inclusive Alliance, which was formed in July 2023 and led by the Indian National Congress nationally. On 25 September 2023, the AIADMK withdrew from the BJP-led NDA and formed a separate alliance.

In January 2024, the AIADMK and the DMK constituted internal committees to hold consultations with the other alliance partners for seat sharing. In February–March 2024, the BJP finalised seat sharing with the constituents of NDA–Pattali Makkal Katchi, and Amma Makkal Munnetra Kazhagam. On 18 March, the DMK finalised seat sharing talks with its allies–the Congress, Communist Party of India, Communist Party of India (Marxist), Viduthalai Chiruthaigal Katchi, and Marumalarchi Dravida Munnetra Kazhagam. On 20 and 21 March 2024, AIADMK general secretary Edappadi K. Palaniswami released the list of candidates from the party, after the party finalised seat sharing with its allies–Desiya Murpokku Dravida Kazhagam, Puthiya Tamilagam, and Social Democratic Party of India.

On 2 February 2024, actor Vijay officially announced the formation of his political party, Tamilaga Vettri Kazhagam. Despite the launch occurring ahead of the 2024 general elections, Vijay stated that the party would not contest the elections and would not extend support to any political bloc in the state.

== Election schedule ==
Poll event	Phase
Poll event	I
Notification date	20 March 2024
Last date for filing nomination	27 March 2024
Scrutiny of nomination	28 March 2024
Last Date for withdrawal of nomination	30 March 2024
Date of poll	19 April 2024
Date of counting of votes/Result	4 June 2024
No. of constituencies	39

== Parties and alliances ==
=== Indian National Developmental Inclusive Alliance ===
Seat allocation of the Indian National Developmental Inclusive Alliance

Party	Flag	Symbol	Leader	Seats contested	
Dravida Munnetra Kazhagam			M. K. Stalin	21	22
Kongunadu Makkal Desia Katchi			E. R. Eswaran	1	22
Indian National Congress			K. Selvaperunthagai	9	
Communist Party of India			R. Mutharasan	2	
Communist Party of India (Marxist)			K. Balakrishnan	2	
Viduthalai Chiruthaigal Katchi			Thol. Thirumavalavan	2	
Indian Union Muslim League			K. M. Kader Mohideen	1	
Marumalarchi Dravida Munnetra Kazhagam			Durai Vaiko	1	
Total				39	

=== AIADMK-led Alliance ===
Seat allocation of the AIADMK-led Alliance

Party	Flag	Symbol	Leader	Seats contested	
All India Anna Dravida Munnetra Kazhagam			Edappadi K. Palaniswami	32	34
Puthiya Tamilagam			K. Krishnasamy	1	34
Social Democratic Party of India			V. M. S. Mohamed Mubarak	1	34
Desiya Murpokku Dravida Kazhagam			Premalatha Vijayakanth	5	
Total				39	

=== National Democratic Alliance ===
Seat allocation of the National Democratic Alliance

Party	Flag	Symbol	Leader	Seats contested	
Bharatiya Janata Party			K. Annamalai	19	23
Indhiya Jananayaga Katchi			T. R. Paarivendhar	1	23
Inthiya Makkal Kalvi Munnetra Kazhagam			T. Devanathan Yadav	1	23
Puthiya Needhi Katchi			A. C. Shanmugam	1	23
Tamizhaga Makkal Munnetra Kazhagam			B. John Pandian	1	23
Pattali Makkal Katchi			Anbumani Ramadoss	10	
Tamil Maanila Congress (Moopanar)			G. K. Vasan	3	
Amma Makkal Munnettra Kazagam			T. T. V. Dhinakaran	2	
Independent			O. Panneerselvam	1	
Total				39	

=== Others ===
Party	Symbol	Seats contested
Bahujan Samaj Party		39
Naam Tamilar Katchi		39
Naadaalum Makkal Katchi		12
Desiya Makkal Sakthi Katchi		9
Veerath Thiyagi Viswanathadoss Thozhilalarkal Katchi		9
Ganasangam Party of India		7
Bahujan Dravida Party		6
Thakkam Katchi		6
Viro Ke Vir Indian Party		6
Anna MGR Dravida Makkal Kalgam		5
Aravor Munnetra Kazhagam		5
Samaniya Makkal Nala Katchi		5
Anti Corruption Dynamic Party		4
Bharatiya Praja Aikyata Party		4
Samaniya Makkal Nala Katchi		4
Puthiya Makkal Tamil Desam Katchi		3
Tamizhaga Murpokku Makkal Katchi		3
Ulzaipali Makkal Katchy		3
United Republican Party of India		3
Aanaithinthiya Jananayaka Pathukappu Kazhagam		2
All India Jananayaka Makkal Kazhagam		2
Ambedkarite Party of India		2
Anna Puratchi Thalaivar Amma Draqvida Munnetra Kazhagam		2
Chennai Youth Party		2
Dhesiya Makkal Kazhagam		2
Jebamani Janata		2
Mahathma Makkal Munnetra Kazhakam		2
Rashtriya Samaj Paksha		2
Socialist Unity Centre of India (Communist)		2
Tamilaga Makkal Thannurimai Katchi		2
Tamilar Makkal Katchi		2
Tamil Manila Murpokku Dravida Kazhagam		2
Ahimsa Socialist Party		1
All India Uzhavargal Uzhaippalargal Katchi		1
All India Youth Development Party		1
All India Youth Development Party		1
Anaithu India Makkal Katchi		1
Anna Makkal Katchi		1
Hindu Samaj Party		1
Hindustan Janta Party		1
Humanity for Peace Party		1
Karunaadu Party		1
Makkal Nala Kazhagam		1
Makkal Nalvaazhvuk Katchi		1
Naam Indiar Party		1
Nam India Naam Indiyar Katchi		1
National Maha Sabha Party		1
New Generation People's Party		1
Punnagai Desam Party		1
Republican Party of India (Sivaraj)		1
Tamilaga Makkal Nala Katchi		1
Tipu Sultan Party		1
Vidiyalai Thedum Indhiyargal Party		1
Viduthalai Kalam Katchi		1

== Candidates ==
Constituency		INDIA		NDA		AIADMK+	
#	Name	Party	Candidate	Party	Candidate	Party	Candidate
1	Tiruvallur (SC)	INC	Sasikanth Senthil	BJP	Pon. V. Balaganapathy	DMDK	K. Nalla Thambi
2	Chennai North	DMK	Kalanidhi Veeraswamy	BJP	R. C. Paul Kanagaraj	ADMK	Royapuram R. Mano
3	Chennai South	DMK	Thamizhachi Thangapandian	BJP	Tamilisai Soundararajan	ADMK	J. Jayavardhan
4	Chennai Central	DMK	Dayanidhi Maran	BJP	Vinoj P. Selvam	DMDK	B. Parthasarathy
5	Sriperumbudur	DMK	T. R. Baalu	TMC	V. N. Venugopal	ADMK	G. Premkumar
6	Kancheepuram (SC)	DMK	G. Selvam	PMK	Jothi Venkatesan	ADMK	E. Rajasekar
7	Arakkonam	DMK	S. Jagathrakshakan	PMK	K. Balu	ADMK	A. L. Vijayan
8	Vellore	DMK	D. M. Kathir Anand	BJP	A. C. Shanmugam (Note: Puthiya Needhi Katchi (PNK) contested on the "Lotus" symbol of the Bhartiya Janata Party (BJP), and is officially recorded as a BJP candidate in electoral records.)	ADMK	S. Pasupathy
9	Krishnagiri	INC	K. Gopinath	BJP	C. Narasimhan	ADMK	V. Jayaprakash
10	Dharmapuri	DMK	A. Mani	PMK	Sowmiya Anbumani	ADMK	R. Asokan
11	Tiruvannamalai	DMK	C. N. Annadurai	BJP	A. Ashwathaman	ADMK	M. Kaliyaperumal
12	Arani	DMK	M. S. Tharanivendhan	PMK	A. Ganeshkumar	ADMK	G. V. Gajendran
13	Viluppuram (SC)	VCK	D. Ravikumar	PMK	Murali Shankar	ADMK	J. Bakkiyaraj
14	Kallakurichi	DMK	Malaiyarasan	PMK	Devdas Wodeyar	ADMK	R. Kumaraguru
15	Salem	DMK	T. M. Selvaganapathi	PMK	Annadurai	ADMK	P. Vignesh
16	Namakkal	DMK	V. S. Matheswaran (Note: Kongunadu Makkal Desia Katchi (KMDK) contested on the "Rising Sun" symbol of the Dravida Munnetra Kazhagam (DMK), and is officially recorded as a DMK candidate in electoral records.)	BJP	K. P. Ramalingam	ADMK	S. Tamil Mani
17	Erode	DMK	K. E. Prakash	TMC	P. Vijayakumar	ADMK	Aatral Ashok Kumar
18	Tiruppur	CPI	K. Subbarayan	BJP	A. P. Muruganandam	ADMK	P. Arunachalam
19	Nilgiris (SC)	DMK	A. Raja	BJP	L. Murugan	ADMK	Logesh Tamilselvan
20	Coimbatore	DMK	Ganapathi Raj Kumar	BJP	K. Annamalai	ADMK	Singai G. Ramachandran
21	Pollachi	DMK	Eswarasamy	BJP	K. Vasantharajan	ADMK	A. Karthikeyan
22	Dindigul	CPM	R. Sachithanantham	PMK	M. Thilagabama	ADMK	V. M. S. Mohamed Mubarak (Note: Social Democratic Party of India (SDPI) contested on the "Two Leaves" symbol of the All India Anna Dravida Munnetra Kazhagam (AIADMK), and is officially recorded as a AIADMK candidate in electoral records.)
23	Karur	INC	S. Jothimani	BJP	V. V. Senthilnathan	ADMK	K. R. L. Thangavel
24	Tiruchirappalli	MDMK	Durai Vaiko	AMMK	P. Senthilnathan	ADMK	P. Karuppaiah
25	Perambalur	DMK	Arun Nehru	BJP	T. R. Paarivendhar (Note: Indiya Jananayaka Katchi (IJK) contested on the "Lotus" symbol of the Bhartiya Janata Party (BJP), and is officially recorded as a BJP candidate in electoral records.)	ADMK	N. D. Chandramohan
26	Cuddalore	INC	M. K. Vishnu Prasad	PMK	Thangar Bachan	DMDK	P. Sivakozhundu
27	Chidambaram (SC)	VCK	Thol. Thirumavalavan	BJP	P. Karthiyayini	ADMK	M. Chandrahaasan
28	Mayiladuthurai	INC	Sudha Ramakrishnan	PMK	Ma. Ka. Stalin	ADMK	P. Babu
29	Nagapattinam (SC)	CPI	V. Selvaraj	BJP	S. G. M Ramesh	ADMK	G. Surjith Sankar
30	Thanjavur	DMK	S. Murasoli	BJP	M. Muruganandam	DMDK	P. Sivanesan
31	Sivaganga	INC	Karti P Chidambaram	BJP	D. Devanathan Yadav (Note: Inthiya Makkal Kalvi Munnetra Kazhagam (IMKMK) contested on the "Lotus" symbol of the Bhartiya Janata Party (BJP), and is officially recorded as a BJP candidate in electoral records.)	ADMK	A. Xavierdas
32	Madurai	CPM	Su. Venkatesan	BJP	Raama Sreenivasan	ADMK	P. Saravanan
33	Theni	DMK	Thanga Tamil Selvan	AMMK	T. T. V. Dhinakaran	ADMK	V. T. Narayanasamy
34	Virudhunagar	INC	B. Manickam Tagore	BJP	R. Radikaa	DMDK	V. Vijaya Prabakaran
35	Ramanathapuram	IUML	K. Navas Kani	IND	O. Panneerselvam (Note: Former CM O. Panneerselvam contested as an Independent candidate in Ramanathapuram Lok Sabha constituency under the "Jackfruit" symbol, with support of the NDA alliance.)	ADMK	P. Jeyaperumal
36	Thoothukkudi	DMK	Kanimozhi Rajathi Karunanidhi	TMC	S. D. R. Vijayaseelan	ADMK	R. Sivasamy Velumani
37	Tenkasi (SC)	DMK	Rani Srikumar	BJP	B. John Pandian (Note: Tamizhaga Makkal Munnetra Kazhagam (TMMK) contested on the "Lotus" symbol of the Bhartiya Janata Party (BJP), and is officially recorded as a BJP candidate in electoral records.)	ADMK	K. Krishnasamy (Note: Puthiya Tamilagam (PT) contested on the "Two Leaves" symbol of the All India Anna Dravida Munnetra Kazhagam (AIADMK), and is officially recorded as a AIADMK candidate in electoral records.)
38	Tirunelveli	INC	C. Robert Bruce	BJP	Nainar Nagendran	ADMK	M. Jansi Rani
39	Kanniyakumari	INC	Vijay Vasanth	BJP	Pon. Radhakrishnan	ADMK	Nazerath Pasilian

== Surveys and polls ==
=== Opinion polls ===
Polling agency	Date published	Margin of error					Lead
Polling agency	Date published	Margin of error	INDIA	NDA	AIADMK	Others	Lead
ABP News-CVoter	April 2024	±3-5%	39	0	0	0	INDIA
ABP News-CVoter	March 2024	±3-5%	39	0	0	0	INDIA
India Today-CVoter	February 2024	±3-5%	39	0	0	0	INDIA
Times Now-ETG	December 2023	±3%	30-36	0-1	3-6	0-2	INDIA
India TV-CNX	October 2023	±3%	32	1	5	1	INDIA
AIADMK leaves NDA
Times Now-ETG	September 2023	±3%	30-34	0-1	3-7	0-1	INDIA
Times Now-ETG	August 2023	±3%	30-34	0-1	3-7	0-1	INDIA
India Today-CVoter	August 2023	±3-5%	39	0	0	0	INDIA

Polling agency	Date published	Margin of error					Lead
Polling agency	Date published	Margin of error	INDIA	NDA	AIADMK	Others	Lead
ABP News-CVoter	March 2024	±3-5%	54.7%	10.9%	27.9%	6.8%	26.9
India Today-CVoter	February 2024	±3-5%	47%	15%	38%		9
AIADMK leaves NDA
India Today-CVoter	August 2023	±3-5%	53%	33%		14%	20

=== Exit polls ===
Polling agency					Lead
Polling agency	INDIA	NDA	AIADMK+	Others	Lead
TV9 Bharatvarsh- People's Insight - Polstrat	35	4			INDIA
Actual results	39	0	0	0	INDIA

== Voters Turnout ==
Constituency		Poll date	Turnout	Swing
1	Tiruvallur (SC)	19 April 2024	68.59%	▼3.74
2	Chennai North	19 April 2024	60.11%	▼4.15
3	Chennai South	19 April 2024	54.17%	▼2.90
4	Chennai Central	19 April 2024	53.96%	▼5.02
5	Sriperumbudur	19 April 2024	60.25%	▼2.19
6	Kancheepuram (SC)	19 April 2024	71.68%	▼3.63
7	Arakkonam	19 April 2024	74.19%	▼4.46
8	Vellore	19 April 2024	73.53%	▲2.07
9	Krishnagiri	19 April 2024	71.50%	▼4.45
10	Dharmapuri	19 April 2024	81.20%	▼1.21
11	Tiruvannamalai	19 April 2024	74.24%	▼3.91
12	Arani	19 April 2024	75.76%	▼3.25
13	Viluppuram (SC)	19 April 2024	76.52%	▼2.14
14	Kallakurichi	19 April 2024	79.21%	▲0.40
15	Salem	19 April 2024	78.16%	▲0.25
16	Namakkal	19 April 2024	78.21%	▼2.01
17	Erode	19 April 2024	70.59%	▼2.52
18	Tiruppur	19 April 2024	70.62%	▼2.59
19	Nilgiris (SC)	19 April 2024	70.95%	▼3.06
20	Coimbatore	19 April 2024	64.89%	▲1.03
21	Pollachi	19 April 2024	70.41%	▼0.74
22	Dindigul	19 April 2024	71.14%	▼4.15
23	Karur	19 April 2024	78.70%	▼0.85
24	Tiruchirappalli	19 April 2024	67.51%	▼1.99
25	Perambalur	19 April 2024	77.43%	▼1.83
26	Cuddalore	19 April 2024	72.57%	▼3.92
27	Chidambaram (SC)	19 April 2024	76.37%	▼1.61
28	Mayiladuthurai	19 April 2024	70.09%	▼3.84
29	Nagapattinam (SC)	19 April 2024	71.94%	▼4.99
30	Thanjavur	19 April 2024	68.27%	▼4.28
31	Sivaganga	19 April 2024	64.26%	▼5.64
32	Madurai	19 April 2024	62.04%	▼4.05
33	Theni	19 April 2024	69.84%	▼5.43
34	Virudhunagar	19 April 2024	70.22%	▼2.27
35	Ramanathapuram	19 April 2024	68.19%	▼0.21
36	Thoothukkudi	19 April 2024	66.88%	▼2.60
37	Tenkasi (SC)	19 April 2024	67.65%	▼3.78
38	Tirunelveli	19 April 2024	64.10%	▼3.12
39	Kanniyakumari	19 April 2024	65.44 %	▼4.39

Highest turnout in Dharmapuri constituency of 81.20% and the lowest is in Chennai Central constituency of 53.96%.

== Results ==
=== Results by alliance or party ===
Alliance/ Party		Popular vote			Seats		
Alliance/ Party		Votes	%	±pp	Contested	Won	+/−
INDIA	DMK (Note: Since KMDK contested on the DMK's "Rising Sun" symbol, KMDK will be officially recognized as DMK candidate by the ECI in affidavits, and will represent the DMK in Parliament. The DMK contested 21 seats, and including this ally, the total rises to 22.)	1,17,54,710 (Note: DMK (1,12,92,674); KMDK (4,62,036))	26.91 (Note: DMK (25.85%); KMDK (1.06%))	▼6.19	22 (Note: DMK (21); KMDK (1))	22	▼2
INDIA	INC	46,59,734	10.67	▼1.79	9	9	▲1
INDIA	CPI(M)	11,00,472	2.52	▲0.17	2	2	Steady
INDIA	VCK	9,82,117	2.25	▲1.10	2	2	▲1
INDIA	CPI	9,37,783	2.15	▼0.23	2	2	Steady
INDIA	MDMK	5,42,213	1.24	New entry	1	1	▲1
INDIA	IUML	5,09,664	1.17	▲0.09	1	1	Steady
INDIA	Total	2,04,86,693	46.91	▼5.61	39	39	▲1
ADMK+	ADMK (Note: Since PT and SDPI contested on the AIADMK's "Two Leaves" symbol, they will be officially recognized as AIADMK candidates by the ECI in affidavits. The AIADMK contested 32 seats, and including these allies, the total rises to 34.)	89,26,508 (Note: AIADMK (84,70,700); PT (2,29,480); SDPI (2,26,328))	20.44 (Note: AIADMK (19.39%); PT (0.53%); SDPI (0.52%))	▲1.30	34 (Note: AIADMK (32); PT (1); SDPI (1))	0	▼1
ADMK+	DMDK	11,28,616	2.58	▲0.44	5	0	Steady
ADMK+	Total	1,00,55,124	23.02	▲1.74 (Note: The swing for the AIADMK alliance in 2024 is measured against the combined 2019 total of AIADMK and DMDK (21.28% in 2019))	39	0	▼1
NDA	BJP (Note: Since IJK, IMKMK, PNK and TMMK contested on the BJP's "Lotus" symbol, they will be officially recognized as BJP candidates by the ECI in affidavits. The BJP contested 19 seats, and including these allies, the total rises to 23.)	49,18,293 (Note: BJP (39,98,824); PNK (3,52,990); TMMK (2,08,825); IMKMK (1,95,788); IJK (1,61,866))	11.26 (Note: BJP (9.15%); PNK (0.81%); TMMK (0.48%); IMKMK (0.45%); IJK (0.37%))	▲7.68	23 (Note: BJP (19); PNK (1); TMMK (1); IMKMK (1); IJK (1))	0	Steady
NDA	PMK	18,79,689	4.30	▼0.99	10	0	Steady
NDA	TMC(M)	4,10,401	0.94	▲0.43	3	0	Steady
NDA	AMMK	3,93,415	0.90	▼4.18	2	0	Steady
NDA	IND	3,42,882	0.87	N/A	1	0	Steady
NDA	Total	79,44,680	18.27	New	39	0	Steady
NTK		35,60,485	8.15	▲4.30	39	0	Steady
Others		3,50,368	0.80	N/A	184	0	Steady
IND		8,09,630	1.77	▼0.32	610	0	Steady
NOTA		4,67,068	1.07	▼0.20			
Total		4,36,74,048	100%	–	950	39	–

=== Results by constituency ===
Constituency			Winner					Runner Up					Margin	%
#	Name	Poll %	Candidate	P	A	Votes	%	Candidate	P	A	Votes	%	Margin	%
1	Tiruvallur (SC)	68.59▼	Sasikanth Senthil	INC	INDIA	7,96,956	56.21	Pon. V. Balaganapathy	BJP	NDA	2,24,801	15.86	5,72,155	40.35
2	Chennai North	60.11▼	K. Veeraswamy	DMK	INDIA	4,97,333	55.11	Royapuram R. Mano	ADMK	ADMK+	1,58,111	17.52	3,39,222	37.59
3	Chennai South	54.17▼	T. Thangapandian	DMK	INDIA	5,16,628	47.00	Tamilisai Soundararajan	BJP	NDA	2,90,683	26.44	2,25,945	20.56
4	Chennai Central	53.96▼	Dayanidhi Maran	DMK	INDIA	4,13,848	56.65	Vinoj P. Selvam	BJP	NDA	1,69,159	23.16	2,44,689	33.49
5	Sriperumbudur	60.25▼	T. R. Baalu	DMK	INDIA	7,58,611	52.65	G. Premkumar	ADMK	ADMK+	2,71,582	18.85	4,87,029	33.80
6	Kancheepuram (SC)	71.68▼	G. Selvam	DMK	INDIA	5,86,044	46.53	E. Rajasekar	ADMK	ADMK+	3,64,571	28.94	2,21,473	17.59
7	Arakkonam	74.19▼	S. Jagathrakshakan	DMK	INDIA	5,63,216	48.39	A. L. Vijayan	ADMK	ADMK+	2,56,656	22.05	3,06,559	26.34
8	Vellore	73.53▲	D. M. Kathir Anand	DMK	INDIA	5,68,692	50.35	A. C. Shanmugam	BJP	NDA	3,52,990	31.25	2,15,702	19.10
9	Krishnagiri	71.50▼	K. Gopinath	INC	INDIA	4,92,883	42.27	V. Jayaprakash	ADMK	ADMK+	3,00,397	25.76	1,92,486	16.51
10	Dharmapuri	81.20▼	A. Mani	DMK	INDIA	4,32,667	34.67	Sowmiya Anbumani	PMK	NDA	4,11,367	32.97	21,300	1.70
11	Tiruvannamalai	74.24▼	C. N. Annadurai	DMK	INDIA	5,47,379	47.75	M. Kaliyaperumal	ADMK	ADMK+	3,13,448	27.34	2,33,931	20.41
12	Arani	75.76▼	M. S. Tharanivendhan	DMK	INDIA	5,00,099	43.86	G. V. Gajendran	ADMK	ADMK+	2,91,333	25.55	2,08,766	18.31
13	Viluppuram (SC)	76.52▼	D. Ravikumar	VCK	INDIA	4,77,033	41.39	J. Bakkiyaraj	ADMK	ADMK+	4,06,330	35.25	70,703	6.14
14	Kallakurichi	79.21▲	Malaiarasan	DMK	INDIA	5,61,589	44.94	R. Kumaraguru	ADMK	ADMK+	5,07,805	40.64	53,784	4.30
15	Salem	78.16▲	T. M. Selvaganapathi	DMK	INDIA	5,66,085	43.38	P. Vignesh	ADMK	ADMK+	4,95,728	37.99	70,357	5.39
16	Namakkal	78.21▼	V. S. Matheswaran	DMK	INDIA	4,62,036	40.31	S. Tamil Mani	ADMK	ADMK+	4,32,924	37.77	29,112	2.54
17	Erode	70.59▼	K. E. Prakash	DMK	INDIA	5,62,339	51.43	Aatral Ashok Kumar	ADMK	ADMK+	3,32,773	29.79	2,36,566	21.64
18	Tiruppur	70.62▼	K. Subbarayan	CPI	INDIA	4,72,739	41.38	P. Arunachalam	ADMK	ADMK+	3,46,811	30.35	1,25,928	11.03
19	Nilgiris (SC)	70.95▼	A. Raja	DMK	INDIA	4,73,212	46.44	L. Murugan	BJP	NDA	2,32,627	22.83	2,40,585	23.61
20	Coimbatore	64.89▲	Ganapathi Raj Kumar	DMK	INDIA	5,68,200	41.39	K. Annamalai	BJP	NDA	4,50,132	32.79	1,18,068	8.60
21	Pollachi	70.41▼	Eswarasamy	DMK	INDIA	5,33,377	47.37	A. Karthikeyan	ADMK	ADMK+	2,81,335	24.98	2,52,042	22.39
22	Dindigul	71.14▼	R. Sachidanandam	CPI(M)	INDIA	6,70,149	58.29	Mhd. Mubarak	ADMK	ADMK+	2,26,328	19.69	4,43,821	38.60
23	Karur	78.70▼	S. Jothimani	INC	INDIA	5,34,906	47.25	K. R. L. Thangavel	ADMK	ADMK+	3,68,090	32.52	1,66,816	14.73
24	Tiruchirappalli	67.51▼	Durai Vaiko	MDMK	INDIA	5,42,213	51.35	P. Karuppaiah	ADMK	ADMK+	2,29,119	21.70	3,13,094	29.65
25	Perambalur	77.43▼	Arun Nehru	DMK	INDIA	6,03,209	53.42	N. D. Chandramohan	ADMK	ADMK+	2,14,102	18.96	3,89,107	34.46
26	Cuddalore	72.57▼	M. K. Vishnu Prasad	INC	INDIA	4,55,053	44.11	P. Sivakozhundu	DMDK	ADMK+	2,69,157	26.09	1,85,896	18.02
27	Chidambaram (SC)	76.37▼	Thol. Thirumavalavan	VCK	INDIA	5,05,084	43.28	M. Chandrahaasan	ADMK	ADMK+	4,01,530	34.40	1,03,554	8.88
28	Mayiladuthurai	70.09▼	Sudha Ramakrishnan	INC	INDIA	5,18,459	47.67	P. Babu	ADMK	ADMK+	2,47,276	22.73	2,71,183	24.94
29	Nagapattinam (SC)	71.94▼	V. Selvaraj	CPI	INDIA	4,65,044	47.79	G. Surjith Sankar	ADMK	ADMK+	2,56,087	26.32	2,08,957	21.47
30	Thanjavur	68.27▼	Murasoli	DMK	INDIA	5,02,245	48.82	P. Sivanesan	DMDK	ADMK+	1,82,662	17.76	3,19,583	31.06
31	Sivaganga	64.26▼	Karti P Chidambaram	INC	INDIA	4,27,677	40.60	A. Xavierdas	ADMK	ADMK+	2,22,013	21.08	2,05,664	21.22
32	Madurai	62.04▼	Su. Venkatesan	CPI(M)	INDIA	4,30,323	43.60	Raama Sreenivasan	BJP	NDA	2,20,914	22.38	2,09,409	21.22
33	Theni	69.84▼	Thanga Tamil Selvan	DMK	INDIA	5,71,493	50.08	T. T. V. Dhinakaran	AMMK	NDA	2,92,668	25.65	2,78,825	24.43
34	Virudhunagar	70.22▼	B. Manickam Tagore	INC	INDIA	3,85,256	36.28	V. Vijaya Prabakaran	DMDK	ADMK+	3,80,877	35.87	4,379	0.41
35	Ramanathapuram	68.19▼	K. Navas Kani	IUML	INDIA	5,09,664	45.92	O. Panneerselvam	IND	NDA	3,42,882	30.89	1,66,782	15.03
36	Thoothukkudi	66.88▼	Kanimozhi Karunanidhi	DMK	INDIA	5,40,729	55.26	R. Sivasamy Velumani	ADMK	ADMK+	1,47,991	15.12	3,92,738	40.14
37	Tenkasi (SC)	67.65▼	Rani Srikumar	DMK	INDIA	4,25,679	40.97	K. Krishnasamy	ADMK	ADMK+	2,29,480	22.08	1,96,199	18.89
38	Tirunelveli	64.10▼	C. Robert Bruce	INC	INDIA	5,02,296	47.06	Nainar Nagendran	BJP	NDA	3,36,676	31.54	1,65,620	15.52
39	Kanniyakumari	65.44▼	Vijay Vasanth	INC	INDIA	5,46,248	53.08	Pon. Radhakrishnan	BJP	NDA	3,66,341	35.60	1,79,907	17.48

== List of elected members ==
=== Overview ===
Part	Seats							
Part	Seats	DMK	INC	CPM	VCK	CPI	MDMK	IUML
Northern TN	13	10	2	—N/a	1	—N/a	—N/a	—N/a
Western TN	10	7	1	1	—N/a	1	—N/a	—N/a
Central TN	7	2	2	—N/a	1	1	1	—N/a
Southern TN	9	3	4	1	—N/a	—N/a	—N/a	1
Total	39	22	9	2	2	2	1	1

=== Detailed Results ===
No.	Constituency	Member	Party
Northern Tamil Nadu
1.	Thiruvallur (SC)	Sasikanth Senthil	Indian National Congress
2.	Chennai North	Kalanidhi Veeraswamy	Dravida Munnetra Kazhagam
3.	Chennai South	Thamizhachi Thangapandian	Dravida Munnetra Kazhagam
4.	Chennai Central	Dayanidhi Maran	Dravida Munnetra Kazhagam
5.	Sriperumbudur	T. R. Baalu	Dravida Munnetra Kazhagam
6.	Kancheepuram (SC)	G. Selvam	Dravida Munnetra Kazhagam
7.	Arakkonam	S. Jagathrakshakan	Dravida Munnetra Kazhagam
8.	Vellore	D. M. Kathir Anand	Dravida Munnetra Kazhagam
9.	Krishnagiri	K. Gopinath	Indian National Congress
10.	Dharmapuri	A. Mani	Dravida Munnetra Kazhagam
11.	Tiruvannamalai	C. N. Annadurai	Dravida Munnetra Kazhagam
12.	Arani	M. S. Tharanivendhan	Dravida Munnetra Kazhagam
13.	Villupuram (SC)	D. Ravikumar	Viduthalai Chiruthaigal Katchi
Western Tamil Nadu
14.	Kallakurichi	D. Malaiyarasan	Dravida Munnetra Kazhagam
15.	Salem	T. M. Selvaganapathy	Dravida Munnetra Kazhagam
16.	Namakkal	V. S. Matheshwaran	Dravida Munnetra Kazhagam
17.	Erode	K. E. Prakash	Dravida Munnetra Kazhagam
18.	Tiruppur	K. Subbarayan	Communist Party of India
19.	Coimbatore	Ganapathi P. Rajkumar	Dravida Munnetra Kazhagam
20.	Nilgiris (SC)	A Raja	Dravida Munnetra Kazhagam
21.	Pollachi	K. Eswarasamy	Dravida Munnetra Kazhagam
22.	Dindigul	R. Sachithanandam	Communist Party of India (Marxist)
23.	Karur	S.Jothimani	Indian National Congress
Central Tamil Nadu
24.	Tiruchirappalli	Durai Vaiko	Marumalarchi Dravida Munnetra Kazhagam
25.	Perambalur	Arun Nehru	Dravida Munnetra Kazhagam
26.	Cuddalore	M. K. Vishnu Prasad	Indian National Congress
27.	Chidambaram (SC)	Thol. Thirumavalavan	Viduthalai Chiruthaigal Katchi
28.	Mayiladuthurai	R. Sudha	Indian National Congress
29.	Nagapattinam (SC)	V. Selvaraj	Communist Party of India
30.	Thanjavur	S. Murasoli	Dravida Munnetra Kazhagam
Southern Tamil Nadu
31.	Sivaganga	Karti P Chidambaram	Indian National Congress
32.	Madurai	S. Venkatesan	Communist Party of India (Marxist)
33.	Theni	Thanga Tamilselvan	Dravida Munnetra Kazhagam
34.	Virudhunagar	Manickam Tagore	Indian National Congress
35.	Ramanathapuram	Navaskani	Indian Union Muslim League
36.	Thoothukkudi	Kanimozhi Rajathi Karunanidhi	Dravida Munnetra Kazhagam
37.	Tenkasi (SC)	Rani Srikumar	Dravida Munnetra Kazhagam
38.	Tirunelveli	C. Robert Bruce	Indian National Congress
39.	Kanniyakumari	Vijay Vasanth	Indian National Congress

== Assembly segments wise lead of Parties ==
Party		2024 Indian General Election		2026 Tamil Nadu Legislative Assembly election
Party		Leads in Assembly segments	Runner-up in Assembly segments	Assembly Seats won
INDIA	DMK	125	7	59
INDIA	INC	52	2	5
INDIA	CPI(M)	12	0	2
INDIA	CPI	12	0	2
INDIA	VCK	8	4	2
INDIA	MDMK	6	0	N/A
INDIA	IUML	6	0	2
INDIA	Total	221	13	73
NDA	BJP	0	59	1
NDA	PMK	3	4	4
NDA	TMC(M)	0	4	N/A
NDA	AMMK	0	5	1
NDA	IND	0	6	N/A
NDA	Total	3	78	6
AIADMK+	ADMK	8	126	47
AIADMK+	DMDK	2	16	1 (As part of SPA)
AIADMK+	Total	10	142	47
TVK	Total	Did not Contest	Did not Contest	108
Others	Total	0	1	0
Total		234		

== Assembly Seat wise leads ==
Constituency		Winner			Runner-up			Margin
#	Name	Party	Votes	%	Party	Votes	%	Margin
Thiruvallur Lok Sabha constituency
1	Gummidipoondi	INC	112,510	56.32	BJP	36,678	18.36	75,832
2	Ponneri (SC)	INC	109,177	56.36	DMDK	41,195	21.27	67,982
4	Thiruvallur	INC	105,694	54.63	DMDK	36,549	18.89	69,045
5	Poonamallee (SC)	INC	146,176	58.34	BJP	38,765	15.47	107,411
6	Avadi	INC	156,527	57.00	BJP	51,034	18.59	105,493
9	Madavaram	INC	164,524	58.15	BJP	43,990	15.55	120,534
Chennai North Lok Sabha constituency
10	Thiruvottiyur	DMK	91,163	53.11	AIADMK	33,260	19.38	57,903
11	R. K. Nagar	DMK	81,364	50.92	AIADMK	36,938	23.12	44,426
12	Perambur	DMK	94,837	56.08	AIADMK	27,214	16.09	67,623
13	Kolathur	DMK	95,084	60.54	BJP	25,585	16.29	69,499
15	Thiru. Vi. Ka. Nagar (SC)	DMK	72,839	60.63	AIADMK	17,864	14.87	54,975
17	Royapuram	DMK	60,896	56.17	AIADMK	24,247	22.36	36,649
Chennai South Lok Sabha constituency
22	Virugampakkam	DMK	69,040	46.32	BJP	43,528	29.20	25,512
23	Saidapet	DMK	76,977	54.31	BJP	28,643	20.21	48,334
24	Thiyagarayanagar	DMK	51,090	41.75	BJP	45,206	36.94	5,884
25	Mylapore	DMK	64,791	47.38	BJP	38,944	28.48	25,847
26	Velachery	DMK	76,245	45.95	BJP	51,353	30.95	24,892
27	Shozhinganallur	DMK	177,164	48.61	BJP	81,555	22.38	95,609
Chennai Central Lok Sabha constituency
14	Villivakkam	DMK	72,027	56.78	BJP	27,299	21.52	44,728
16	Egmore	DMK	63,219	58.83	BJP	23,564	21.93	39,655
18	Harbour	DMK	53,649	58.50	BJP	27,117	29.57	26,532
19	Chepauk-Thiruvallikeni	DMK	80,833	65.02	BJP	24,926	20.05	55,907
20	Thousand Lights	DMK	66,015	54.81	BJP	31,372	26.05	34,643
21	Anna Nagar	DMK	76,543	52.63	BJP	33,781	23.23	42,762
Sriperumbudur Lok Sabha constituency
7	Maduravoyal	DMK	124,236	51.51	AIADMK	46,181	19.15	78,055
8	Ambattur	DMK	112,217	53.13	AIADMK	37,029	17.53	75,188
28	Alandur	DMK	120,689	54.77	TMC(M)	39,567	17.95	81,122
29	Sriperumbudur	DMK	146,020	54.73	AIADMK	65,480	24.54	80,540
30	Pallavaram	DMK	131,811	54.56	AIADMK	46,104	19.08	85,707
31	Tambaram	DMK	120,698	52.97	TMC(M)	39,789	17.46	80,909
Kancheepuram Lok Sabha constituency
32	Chengalpattu	DMK	133,604	51.61	AIADMK	59,815	23.11	73,789
33	Thiruporur	DMK	102,725	46.65	AIADMK	55,665	25.28	47,060
34	Cheyyur (SC)	DMK	76,648	46.00	AIADMK	56,137	33.69	20,511
35	Madhuranthakam (SC)	DMK	77,747	44.22	AIADMK	65,740	37.39	12,007
36	Uthiramerur	DMK	92,857	45.73	AIADMK	70,152	34.54	22,705
37	Kancheepuram	DMK	99,397	46.95	AIADMK	55,482	26.20	43,915
Arakkonam Lok Sabha constituency
3	Tiruttani	DMK	105,052	50.07	AIADMK	50,729	24.18	54,323
38	Arakkonam (SC)	DMK	80,930	49.71	AIADMK	32,544	19.99	48,386
39	Sholinghur	DMK	87,418	41.47	AIADMK	52,551	24.93	34,867
40	Katpadi	DMK	77,130	45.24	AIADMK	35,884	21.05	41,246
41	Ranipet	DMK	103,513	53.24	AIADMK	38,710	19.91	64,803
42	Arcot	DMK	96,535	49.26	AIADMK	44,925	22.92	51,610
Vellore Lok Sabha constituency
43	Vellore	DMK	84,154	49.19	BJP	64,822	37.89	19,332
44	Anaikattu	DMK	88,321	45.63	BJP	71,041	36.70	17,280
45	K. V. Kuppam (SC)	DMK	76,470	44.38	BJP	63,051	36.60	13,419
46	Gudiyattam	DMK	113,445	54.24	BJP	58,585	28.01	54,860
47	Vaniyambadi	DMK	103,364	54.41	BJP	46,699	24.58	56,665
48	Ambur	DMK	100,681	56.28	BJP	46,758	26.14	53,923
Krishnagiri Lok Sabha constituency
51	Uthangarai (SC)	INC	78,352	44.84	AIADMK	47,775	27.34	30,577
52	Bargur	INC	78,549	43.44	AIADMK	52,695	29.14	25,854
53	Krishnagiri	INC	91,222	45.90	AIADMK	52,983	26.66	38,239
54	Veppanahalli	INC	80,436	42.17	AIADMK	55,989	29.35	24,447
55	Hosur	INC	92,623	39.83	BJP	60,715	26.11	31,908
56	Thalli	INC	69,949	40.58	BJP	49,594	28.77	20,355
Dharmapuri Lok Sabha constituency
57	Palacode	DMK	71,344	35.20	PMK	60,878	30.04	10,466
58	Pennagaram	PMK	76,166	37.36	DMK	64,581	31.68	11,585
59	Dharmapuri	PMK	79,527	37.89	DMK	66,002	31.45	13,525
60	Pappireddipatti	PMK	82,324	38.76	DMK	73,700	34.70	8,624
61	Harur (SC)	DMK	85,850	44.14	AIADMK	47,641	24.50	38,209
85	Mettur	DMK	67,824	32.92	PMK	63,265	30.70	4,559
Tiruvannamalai Lok Sabha constituency
49	Jolarpet	DMK	78,665	43.93	AIADMK	53,774	30.03	20,881
50	Tirupattur	DMK	84,622	49.88	AIADMK	44,043	25.96	40,579
62	Chengam	DMK	101,432	48.18	AIADMK	58,798	27.93	42,634
63	Tiruvannamalai	DMK	103,175	53.50	AIADMK	46,256	23.99	56,919
64	Kilpennathur	DMK	89,847	47.36	AIADMK	54,437	28.70	35,410
65	Kalasapakkam	DMK	86,116	46.82	AIADMK	54,076	29.40	32,040
Arani Lok Sabha constituency
66	Polur	DMK	89,039	47.49	AIADMK	48,477	25.86	40,562
67	Arani	DMK	87,582	42.81	AIADMK	70,532	34.48	17,050
68	Cheyyar	DMK	83,642	41.21	AIADMK	49,564	24.42	34,078
69	Vandavasi	DMK	83,010	48.13	PMK	42,968	24.92	40,042
70	Gingee	DMK	82,244	43.16	AIADMK	47,893	25.13	34,351
71	Mailam	DMK	71,566	43.32	AIADMK	42,145	25.51	29,421
Viluppuram Lok Sabha constituency (SC)
72	Tindivanam (SC)	VCK	79,112	45.36	AIADMK	52,766	30.25	26,346
73	Vanur (SC)	VCK	81,431	45.89	AIADMK	57,238	32.26	24,193
74	Viluppuram	VCK	78,734	41.60	AIADMK	62,825	33.20	15,909
75	Vikravandi	VCK	72,188	39.85	AIADMK	65,365	36.09	6,823
76	Tirukkoyilur	AIADMK	73,411	40.38	VCK	71,513	39.34	1,898
77	Ulundurpet	AIADMK	92,898	39.94	VCK	91,252	39.23	1,646
Kallakurichi Lok Sabha constituency
78	Rishivandiyam	DMK	98,212	46.49	AIADMK	87,092	41.23	11,120
79	Sankarapuram	DMK	95,829	45.88	AIADMK	87,539	41.91	8,290
80	Kallakurichi (SC)	DMK	100,636	44.91	AIADMK	95,946	42.82	4,690
81	Gangavalli (SC)	DMK	77,483	44.23	AIADMK	72,235	41.23	5,428
82	Attur (SC)	DMK	85,579	45.61	AIADMK	72,465	38.62	13,114
83	Yercaud (ST)	DMK	100,607	44.29	AIADMK	90,300	39.75	10,307
Salem Lok Sabha constituency
84	Omalur	DMK	99,519	40.94	AIADMK	95,966	39.48	3,553
86	Edappadi	AIADMK	123,842	51.73	DMK	77,522	32.38	46,320
88	Salem West	DMK	95,935	45.94	AIADMK	73,947	35.41	21,988
89	Salem North	DMK	96,039	51.28	AIADMK	55,731	29.76	40,308
90	Salem South	DMK	89,177	47.90	AIADMK	64,777	34.79	24,400
91	Veerapandi	DMK	103,830	48.01	AIADMK	78,695	36.39	25,135
Namakkal Lok Sabha constituency
87	Sankagiri	AIADMK	88,358	40.54	DMK	84,924	38.97	3,434
92	Rasipuram (SC)	DMK	76,596	41.21	AIADMK	72,080	38.78	4,516
93	Senthamangalam	DMK	82,335	43.42	AIADMK	71,152	37.53	11,183
94	Namakkal	DMK	79,263	41.91	AIADMK	67,343	35.60	11,920
95	Paramathi Velur	AIADMK	69,657	41.35	DMK	63,615	37.76	6,042
96	Tiruchengode	DMK	70,962	41.17	AIADMK	60,768	35.25	10,194
Erode Lok Sabha constituency
97	Kumarapalayam	AIADMK	84,123	44.68	DMK	74,425	39.53	9,698
98	Erode East	DMK	86,646	57.48	AIADMK	34,817	23.10	51,829
99	Erode West	DMK	105,789	54.68	AIADMK	45,345	23.44	60,444
100	Modakkurichi	DMK	101,549	58.99	AIADMK	38,694	22.48	62,855
101	Dharapuram	DMK	95,382	52.25	AIADMK	59,618	32.66	35,764
102	Kangayam	DMK	95,058	51.25	AIADMK	61,154	32.97	33,904
Tiruppur Lok Sabha constituency
103	Perundurai	CPI	75,437	41.89	AIADMK	61,927	34.39	13,510
104	Bhavani	CPI	69,541	37.42	AIADMK	68,686	36.96	855
105	Anthiyur	CPI	68,407	41.79	AIADMK	54,700	33.42	13,707
106	Gobichettipalayam	CPI	86,471	43.92	AIADMK	62,908	31.95	23,563
113	Tiruppur North	CPI	95,061	41.21	AIADMK	62,305	27.01	32,705
114	Tiruppur South	CPI	75,278	46.54	AIADMK	34,800	21.51	40,478
Nilgiris Lok Sabha constituency
107	Bhavanisagar	DMK	92,445	47.29	AIADMK	51,159	26.17	41,286
108	Udagamandalam	DMK	63,741	49.11	BJP	36,631	28.22	27,010
109	Gudalur	DMK	69,194	54.31	BJP	27,454	21.55	41,740
110	Coonoor	DMK	64,483	51.98	BJP	29,230	23.56	35,253
111	Mettuppalyam	DMK	95,737	43.91	AIADMK	54,022	24.78	41,715
112	Avanashi	DMK	85,129	41.33	AIADMK	54,543	26.48	30,586
Coimbatore Lok Sabha constituency
115	Palladam	DMK	114,139	42.86	BJP	76,333	28.66	37,806
116	Sulur	DMK	96,019	39.51	BJP	75,501	31.07	20,518
117	Kavundampalayam	DMK	129,009	41.63	BJP	104,549	33.74	15,460
118	Coimbatore North	DMK	80,963	41.15	BJP	71,174	36.18	9,789
120	Coimbatore South	DMK	61,929	43.10	BJP	53,579	37.29	8,350
121	Singanallur	DMK	83,369	42.78	BJP	66,472	34.11	16,897
Pollachi Lok Sabha constituency
119	Thondamuthur	DMK	98,355	43.55	AIADMK	57,927	25.65	40,428
122	Kinathukadavu	DMK	104,350	45.79	BJP	58,768	25.79	45,782
123	Pollachi	DMK	74,232	44.84	AIADMK	44,113	26.64	30,119
124	Valparai	DMK	68,590	50.22	AIADMK	39,049	28.59	29,541
125	Udumalaipet	DMK	93,639	51.81	AIADMK	44,641	24.70	48,998
126	Madathukulam	DMK	91,576	54.04	AIADMK	46,301	27.32	45,275
Dindigul Lok Sabha constituency
127	Palani	CPI(M)	103,002	56.92	AIADMK	42,046	23.24	60,956
128	Oddanchatram	CPI(M)	113,647	63.61	AIADMK	38,121	21.34	75,526
129	Athoor	CPI(M)	139,913	66.56	AIADMK	31,720	15.09	108,193
130	Nilakottai	CPI(M)	89,361	53.22	AIADMK	37,533	22.35	51,828
131	Natham	CPI(M)	117,782	57.19	AIADMK	45,688	22.18	72,094
132	Dindigul	CPI(M)	104,280	58.71	AIADMK	30,384	17.11	73,896
Karur Lok Sabha constituency
133	Vedasandur	INC	93,548	46.79	AIADMK	69,642	34.84	23,906
134	Aravakurichi	INC	87,390	53.04	AIADMK	44,342	26.91	43,048
135	Karur	INC	90,149	47.26	AIADMK	62,577	32.81	27,572
136	Krishnarayapuram (SC)	INC	89,520	51.92	AIADMK	50,577	29.33	38,943
138	Manapparai	INC	96,224	45.49	AIADMK	70,796	33.47	25,428
179	Viralimalai	INC	74,998	42.18	AIADMK	68,275	38.40	6,723
Tiruchirappalli Lok Sabha constituency
139	Srirangam	MDMK	99,160	45.17	AIADMK	55,859	25.45	43,301
140	Trichy West	MDMK	94,718	57.10	AIADMK	26,282	15.85	68,436
141	Trichy East	MDMK	90,780	57.92	AIADMK	27,066	17.27	63,714
142	Thiruverumbur	MDMK	102,677	57.51	AIADMK	32,849	18.40	69,828
178	Gandharvakottai	MDMK	72,238	48.57	AIADMK	39,573	26.61	32,665
180	Pudukkottai	MDMK	79,304	48.01	AIADMK	45,816	27.73	33,488
Perambalur Lok Sabha constituency
137	Kulithalai	DMK	110,854	58.45	AIADMK	37,742	19.90	73,112
143	Lalgudi	DMK	92,655	54.86	BJP	31,037	18.38	61,618
144	Manachanallur	DMK	92,651	49.62	AIADMK	42,808	22.93	49,843
145	Musiri	DMK	86,827	51.51	AIADMK	35,277	20.93	51,550
146	Thuraiyur (SC)	DMK	91,546	54.93	AIADMK	31,652	18.99	59,894
147	Perambalur (SC)	DMK	123,470	53.86	BJP	39,228	17.11	84,242
Cuddalore Lok Sabha constituency
151	Tittagudi (SC)	INC	69,777	45.33	DMDK	42,798	27.80	26,979
152	Vridhachalam	INC	77,115	42.67	DMDK	49,353	27.31	28,362
153	Neyveli	INC	55,219	38.26	DMDK	39,334	27.25	15,885
154	Panruti	INC	84,693	46.05	DMDK	54,435	29.60	30,258
155	Cuddalore	INC	76,762	46.99	DMDK	38,643	23.65	38,119
156	Kurinjipadi	INC	86,835	46.12	DMDK	43,244	22.97	43,591
Chidambaram Lok Sabha constituency (SC)
148	Kunnam	VCK	85,495	41.00	AIADMK	76,610	36.74	8,885
149	Ariyalur	AIADMK	88,632	42.13	VCK	78,793	37.45	9,839
150	Jayankondam	AIADMK	77,865	38.82	VCK	76,486	38.13	1,379
157	Bhuvanagiri	VCK	87,150	46.31	AIADMK	64,385	34.21	22,765
158	Chidambaram	VCK	80,922	46.68	AIADMK	48,441	27.94	32,481
159	Kattumannarkovil (SC)	VCK	93,005	55.02	AIADMK	43,569	25.77	49,436
Mayiladuthurai Lok Sabha constituency
160	Sirkazhi (SC)	INC	81,451	46.06	AIADMK	45,931	25.97	35,520
161	Mayiladuthurai	INC	75,020	46.42	AIADMK	37,569	23.24	37,451
162	Poompuhar	INC	87,435	45.33	AIADMK	56,153	29.11	31,282
170	Thiruvidaimarudur (SC)	INC	86,265	47.04	PMK	38,764	21.14	47,501
171	Kumbakonam	INC	91,538	50.93	AIADMK	32,676	18.18	58,862
172	Papanasam	INC	94,825	52.59	AIADMK	36,316	20.14	58,509
Nagapattinam Lok Sabha constituency (SC)
163	Nagapattinam	CPI	66,074	50.41	AIADMK	34,653	26.44	31,421
164	Kilvelur	CPI	62,341	46.46	AIADMK	39,302	29.29	23,039
165	Vedharanyam	CPI	55,203	39.22	AIADMK	42,927	30.50	12,276
166	Thiruthuraipoondi	CPI	87,641	52.12	AIADMK	36,874	21.93	50,767
168	Thiruvarur	CPI	98,365	52.06	AIADMK	43,847	23.21	54,518
169	Nannilam	CPI	93,135	47.50	AIADMK	57,073	29.11	36,062
Thanjavur Lok Sabha constituency
167	Mannargudi	DMK	83,679	49.52	DMDK	32,897	19.47	50,782
173	Thiruvaiyaru	DMK	101,270	53.19	DMDK	31,287	16.43	69,983
174	Thanjavur	DMK	93,499	55.76	BJP	26,358	15.72	67,141
175	Orathanadu	DMK	80,095	47.95	BJP	31,324	18.75	48,771
176	Pattukkottai	DMK	76,666	47.25	DMDK	31,382	19.34	45,284
177	Peravurani	DMK	63,613	41.36	DMDK	36,584	23.79	27,029
Sivagangai Lok Sabha constituency
181	Thirumayam	INC	65,411	42.72	AIADMK	40,167	26.23	25,244
182	Alangudi	INC	69,244	44.78	AIADMK	37,531	24.27	31,713
184	Karaikudi	INC	76,767	40.91	BJP	42,203	22.49	34,564
185	Thiruppathur	INC	77,613	41.67	AIADMK	41,028	22.03	36,585
186	Sivagangai	INC	66,464	36.85	BJP	39,860	22.10	26,604
187	Manamadurai (SC)	INC	70,132	39.35	BJP	40,552	22.75	29,580
Madurai Lok Sabha constituency
188	Melur	CPI(M)	69,258	41.52	AIADMK	39,123	23.45	30,135
189	Madurai East	CPI(M)	115,201	50.86	BJP	43,120	19.04	72,081
191	Madurai North	CPI(M)	59,955	43.21	AIADMK	30,681	22.11	29,274
192	Madurai South	CPI(M)	45,783	35.56	BJP	42,073	32.68	3,710
193	Madurai Central	CPI(M)	63,516	48.53	BJP	28,864	22.05	34,652
194	Madurai West	CPI(M)	74,488	41.65	AIADMK	43,147	24.12	31,341
Theni Lok Sabha constituency
190	Sholavandhan	DMK	86,966	52.33	AIADMK	31,404	18.90	55,562
197	Usilampatti	DMK	109,005	55.56	AMMK	39,930	20.35	69,075
198	Andipatti	DMK	90,059	46.50	AMMK	54,617	28.20	35,442
199	Periyakulam (SC)	DMK	91,733	48.94	AMMK	58,241	31.07	33,492
200	Bodinayakkanur	DMK	93,053	48.37	AMMK	57,267	29.77	35,786
201	Cumbum	DMK	98,294	52.69	AMMK	51,665	27.70	46,599
Virudhunagar Lok Sabha constituency
195	Thiruparankundram	INC	77,119	35.33	DMDK	71,664	32.84	5,455
196	Thirumangalam	DMDK	79,591	40.86	INC	69,587	35.72	10,004
204	Sattur	INC	65,052	38.48	DMDK	59,238	35.04	5,814
205	Sivakasi	INC	67,086	40.70	DMDK	53,236	32.29	13,850
206	Virudhunagar	INC	54,651	37.58	DMDK	52,855	36.34	1,796
207	Aruppukkottai	DMDK	61,659	40.60	INC	49,381	32.52	12,278
Ramanathapuram Lok Sabha constituency
183	Aranthangi	IUML	81,208	51.79	IND	41,026	26.16	40,182
208	Thiruchuli	IUML	71,234	44.37	IND	42,134	26.24	29,100
209	Paramakudi	IUML	71,759	41.96	IND	57,093	33.38	14,666
210	Thiruvadanai	IUML	92,044	47.27	IND	61,706	31.69	30,338
211	Ramanathapuram	IUML	104,693	49.93	IND	66,761	31.84	37,932
212	Mudukulathur	IUML	85,752	42.20	IND	72,058	35.46	13,694
Thoothukudi Lok Sabha constituency
213	Vilathikulam	DMK	80,369	53.02	AIADMK	31,711	20.92	48,658
214	Thoothukudi	DMK	103,161	58.62	Other	22,757	12.93	80,404
215	Tiruchendur	DMK	100,441	62.24	TMC(M)	22,383	13.87	78,058
216	Srivaikundam	DMK	81,371	54.17	TMC(M)	26,470	17.62	54,901
217	Ottapidaram (SC)	DMK	85,274	52.36	AIADMK	26,504	16.27	58,770
218	Kovilpatti	DMK	87,263	54.09	AIADMK	27,561	17.08	59,702
Tenkasi Lok Sabha constituency
202	Rajapalayam	DMK	60,632	39.45	AIADMK	38,000	24.72	22,632
203	Srivilliputhur	DMK	68,033	41.95	AIADMK	43,205	26.64	24,828
219	Sankarankovil	DMK	64,475	39.85	AIADMK	40,079	24.77	24,396
220	Vasudevanallur (SC)	DMK	61,592	39.11	AIADMK	37,745	23.97	23,847
221	Kadayanallur	DMK	85,951	46.56	BJP	45,429	24.61	40,522
222	Tenkasi	DMK	82,342	42.30	BJP	50,328	25.85	32,014
Thirunelveli Lok Sabha constituency
223	Alangulam	INC	84,694	44.66	BJP	56,636	29.86	28,058
224	Thirunelveli	INC	84,338	45.05	BJP	64,732	34.58	19,606
225	Ambasamuthiram	INC	78,890	47.46	BJP	56,710	34.12	22,280
226	Palayamkottai	INC	90,019	58.22	BJP	41,072	26.56	48,947
227	Nanguneri	INC	82,994	45.65	BJP	57,930	31.86	25,064
228	Radhapuram	INC	78,558	45.19	BJP	57,351	32.99	21,207
Kanniyakumari Lok Sabha constituency
229	Kanniyakumari	INC	96,189	47.03	BJP	77,658	37.97	18,531
230	Nagercoil	INC	77,226	46.24	BJP	70,702	42.34	6,524
231	Colachal	INC	93,538	54.35	BJP	60,583	35.20	32,955
232	Padmanabhapuram	INC	89,716	55.93	BJP	54,542	34.00	35,174
233	Vilavancode	INC	87,668	56.83	BJP	53,649	34.78	34,019
234	Killiyur	INC	95,930	61.94	BJP	44,489	28.73	51,441

== Aftermath ==
Though the DMK-led alliance won a clean sweep of all the 39 seats in the state, and the NDA did not win any seat in the state, the NDA won a majority nationally, and Narendra Modi was sworn in as the Prime Minister of India for the third consecutive term.

In May 2026, after the Tamil Nadu Legislative Assembly Election Result, INC, VCK, and IUML allied with Tamilaga Vettri Kazhagam to form the Government, breaking from DMK alliance. Thus the DMK+ alliance currently has 27 seats in Lok Sabha, while the TVK-INC-IUML-VCK alliance (which was later renamed as Secular Social Justice Victory Alliance) has 12 seats in Lok Sabha.
