= 2019 Indian general election in Tamil Nadu =

Elections for the 17th Lok Sabha seats in Tamil Nadu state

Indian general election in Tamil Nadu, 2019
- 18 April 2019 (38 Seats); 5 August 2019 (1 Seat)

All 39 seats of Lok Sabha
- Registered: 5,78,09,201
- Turnout: 72.44%(▼1.22%)
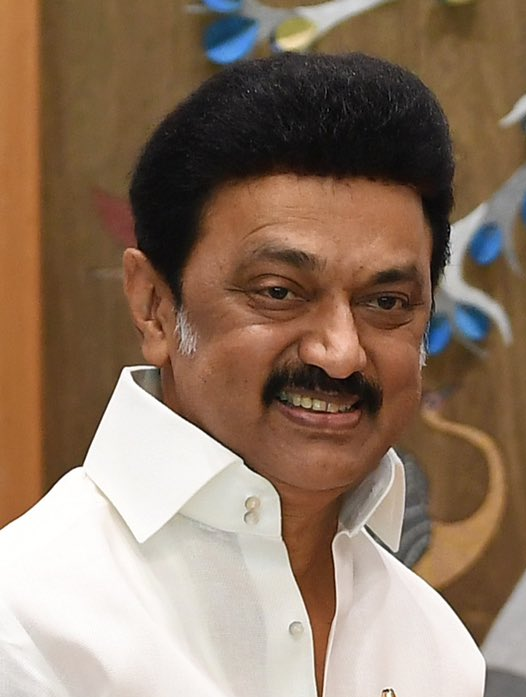

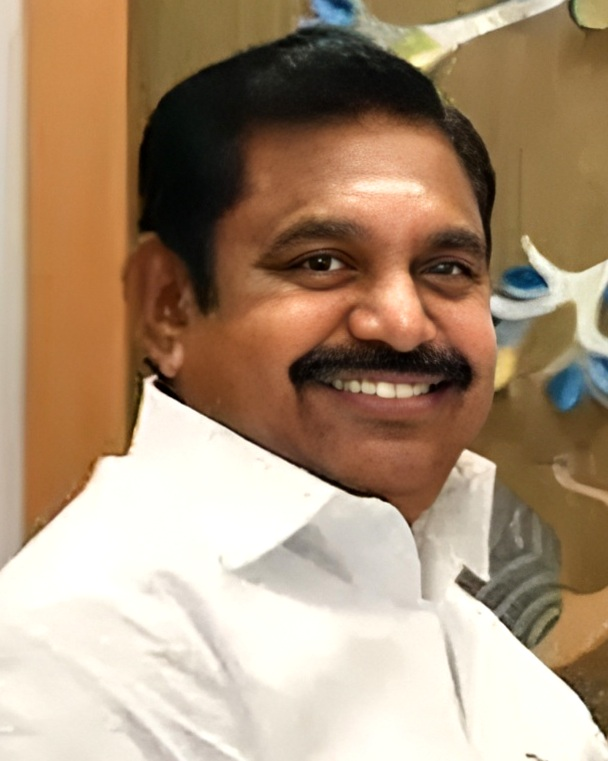
	First party	Second party
Leader	M. K. Stalin	Edappadi K. Palaniswami
Party	DMK	AIADMK
Alliance	UPA	NDA
Last election	0	39
Seats won	38	1
Seat change	▲38	▼38
Popular vote	2,27,89,020	1,33,07,139
Percentage	53.15%	30.56%
Swing	▲16.33%	▼29.51%
Prime Minister before election
Narendra Modi
BJP
Prime Minister after election
Narendra Modi
BJP

The 2019 Indian general election in Tamil Nadu was held on 18 April 2019 in a single phase as part of the second phase of the 2019 Indian general election to elect the 39 members of the 17th Lok Sabha from the state of Tamil Nadu. Simultaneously, by-elections to 18 constituencies of the Tamil Nadu Legislative Assembly were conducted on the same day, while by-elections in four additional assembly constituencies were held on 19 May 2019. The counting of votes for both the parliamentary election and the assembly by-elections took place on 23 May 2019.

The election resulted in a landslide victory for the alliance led by the Dravida Munnetra Kazhagam (DMK), which won 38 of the state's 39 Lok Sabha seats. The All India Anna Dravida Munnetra Kazhagam (AIADMK)-led alliance secured the remaining seat.

A total of 845 candidates contested the election across the state's 39 parliamentary constituencies. Tamil Nadu had an electorate of 59,123,197 registered voters and 67,664 polling stations. Of the 39 constituencies, 32 were general constituencies and seven were reserved for candidates belonging to the Scheduled Castes; there were no constituencies reserved for Scheduled Tribes.

== Schedule ==
Event	Date	
Date for Nominations	19 March 2019	
Last date for filing Nominations	26 March 2019	
Scrutiny of Nominations	27 March 2019	
Last date for withdrawal of candidature	29 March 2019	
Date of poll	18 April 2019	5 August 2019
Counting of votes	23 May 2019	9 August 2019
No of constituencies to be held on the date	38	1

== Parties and alliances ==
=== United Progressive Alliance ===
The Dravida Munnetra Kazhagam (DMK) and the Indian National Congress renewed their electoral alliance ahead of the 2019 Indian general election, continuing the partnership that had been re-established for the 2016 Tamil Nadu Legislative Assembly election after the two parties had contested the 2014 Indian general election separately. The alliance was based on their shared opposition to the Bharatiya Janata Party (BJP)-led National Democratic Alliance and cooperation among opposition parties at the national level.

On 20 February 2019, the DMK and the Congress signed a seat-sharing agreement at Anna Arivalayam, the DMK headquarters in Chennai. The agreement was signed by DMK president M. K. Stalin and Tamil Nadu Congress Committee president K. S. Alagiri, in the presence of senior leaders from both parties, including K. C. Venugopal, Mukul Wasnik, Duraimurugan and T. R. Baalu.

Under the agreement, the Congress contested nine of the 39 Lok Sabha constituencies in Tamil Nadu and the lone Lok Sabha constituency in Puducherry. The allocation of individual constituencies was finalised following consultations with the alliance partners.

United Progressive Alliance
Party	Flag	Symbol	Leader	Seat(s) Contested	
Dravida Munnetra Kazhagam			M. K. Stalin	20	24
Indhiya Jananayaga Katchi			T. R. Paarivendhar	1	24
Marumalarchi Dravida Munnetra Kazhagam			Vaiko	1	24
Kongunadu Makkal Desia Katchi			E. R. Eswaran	1	24
Viduthalai Chiruthaigal Katchi			D. Ravikumar	1	24
Indian National Congress			K. S. Alagiri	9	
Communist Party of India			R. Mutharasan	2	
Communist Party of India			K. Balakrishnan	2	
Viduthalai Chiruthaigal Katchi			Thol. Thirumavalavan	1	
Indian Union Muslim League			K. M. Kader Mohideen	1	
Total				39	

=== National Democratic Alliance ===
National Democratic Alliance
Party	Flag	Symbol	Leader	Seat(s) Contested	
All India Anna Dravida Munnetra Kazhagam			O. Panneerselvam; Edappadi K. Palaniswami	20	22
Puthiya Needhi Katchi			A. C. Shanmugam	1	22
Puthiya Tamilagam			K. Krishnasamy	1	22
Pattali Makkal Katchi			S. Ramadoss	7	
Bharatiya Janata Party			Tamilisai Soundararajan	5	
Desiya Murpokku Dravida Kazhagam			Vijayakanth	4	
Tamil Maanila Congress (Moopanar)			G. K. Vasan	1	
Total				39	

=== Amma Makkal Munnetra Kazhagam (AMMK) alliance ===
The Amma Makkal Munnetra Kazhagam (AMMK), led by T. T. V. Dhinakaran, contested the election as the head of an independent alliance. The party entered into a seat-sharing agreement with the Social Democratic Party of India (SDPI), allotting the Chennai Central Lok Sabha constituency to its ally while contesting the remaining 38 parliamentary constituencies in Tamil Nadu.

The AMMK announced its candidates in two phases during March 2019. The party fielded a mix of new candidates and former All India Anna Dravida Munnetra Kazhagam (AIADMK) legislators, including several MLAs who had been disqualified after supporting Dhinakaran. Among its prominent candidates were former Minister for Special Programme Implementation Thanga Tamilselvan in Theni Lok Sabha constituency, former Minister for Higher Education P. Palaniappan in Dharmapuri Lok Sabha constituency, former Minister for Law Isakki Subbiah in Chennai South Lok Sabha constituency, former Mayor of Tiruchirappalli Sarubala R. Tondaiman in Tiruchirappalli Lok Sabha constituency, K. David Annadurai, son of former Speaker of the Tamil Nadu Legislative Assembly K. Kalimuthu, in Madurai Lok Sabha constituency, former Minister for Agriculture K. Pandurangan in Vellore Lok Sabha constituency, and former MLAs N. Ganapathy, S. K. Selvam and M. Rajasekaran in Viluppuram Lok Sabha constituency, Salem Lok Sabha constituency and Perambalur Lok Sabha constituency, respectively.

The party also re-nominated several disqualified AIADMK MLAs in their respective Assembly constituencies for the simultaneous by-elections.

The AMMK-led alliance failed to win any of the 39 Lok Sabha seats, as the election resulted in a landslide victory for the Dravida Munnetra Kazhagam (DMK)-led alliance.

Party	Flag	Symbol	Leader	Seats contested
Amma Makkal Munnettra Kazhagam			T. T. V. Dhinakaran	38
Social Democratic Party of India			Teqhlan Bhagavi	1

=== Makkal Needhi Maiam (MNM) alliance ===
The Makkal Needhi Maiam (MNM), led by Kamal Haasan, announced in December 2018 that it would contest the 2019 Indian general election and seek alliances with like-minded political parties. Haasan stated that the party would not align with parties that sought to "change Tamil Nadu's DNA", a remark widely interpreted as distancing the party from the Bharatiya Janata Party (BJP). The party campaigned on issues such as anti-corruption, rural development, federalism and social justice.

On 20 March 2019, the MNM entered into an electoral alliance with the Republican Party of India (RPI). Under the seat-sharing arrangement, the RPI contested one Lok Sabha constituency and three Assembly by-election constituencies on the MNM's Torch Light election symbol.

Although Kamal Haasan had earlier indicated that he was willing to contest the election, he later announced that he would not be a candidate, stating that all MNM candidates represented him. The party contested all 39 Lok Sabha constituencies in Tamil Nadu and the lone constituency in Puducherry, either directly or through its alliance partner. Its election manifesto promised the creation of 5 million jobs, equal pay for women, free Wi-Fi, abolition of highway tolls, strengthening of the Lokayukta, and electoral reforms, among other measures.

The MNM failed to win any Lok Sabha seats. However, it secured the third-highest vote share in 13 constituencies, particularly in urban and industrial regions such as Chennai Central, Chennai North, Chennai South, Coimbatore, Sriperumbudur and Tiruppur, marking its emergence as a notable third political force in the state.

Party		Flag	Symbol	Leader	Seats contested
Makkal Needhi Maiam	MNM			Kamal Haasan	36

== Candidate List ==
=== List of Candidates from Prominent Alliances ===
Constituency		UPA		NDA	
#	Name	Party	Candidate	Party	Candidate
1	Thiruvallur (SC)	INC	K. Jeyakumar	ADMK	P. Venugopal
2	Chennai North	DMK	Kalanidhi Veeraswamy	DMDK	R. Mohanraj
3	Chennai South	DMK	T. Thangapandian	ADMK	J. Jayavardhan
4	Chennai Central	DMK	Dayanidhi Maran	PMK	S. R. Sam Paul
5	Sriperumbudur	DMK	T. R. Baalu	PMK	A. Vaithilingam
6	Kancheepuram (SC)	DMK	G. Selvam	ADMK	K. Maragatham
7	Arakkonam	DMK	S. Jagathrakshakan	PMK	A. K. Moorthy
8	Vellore	DMK	Kathir Anand	ADMK	A. C. Shanmugam (Note: Puthiya Needhi Katchi (PNK) candidate contested on the "Two Leaves" symbol of the All India Anna Dravida Munnetra Kazhagam (AIADMK), and is officially recorded as a AIADMK candidate in electoral records.)
9	Krishnagiri	INC	A. Chellakumar	ADMK	K. P. Munusamy
10	Dharmapuri	DMK	S. Senthil Kumar	PMK	Anbumani Ramadoss
11	Tiruvannamalai	DMK	Annadurai C. N.	ADMK	Agri S. S. Krishnamurthy
12	Arani	INC	M. K. Vishnu Prasad	ADMK	V. Elumalai
13	Villupuram (SC)	DMK	D. Ravikumar (Note: Viduthalai Chiruthaigal Katchi (VCK) contested in two seats and one of its candidate Thol. Thirumavalavan contesting with party allotted symbol "Pot" in PC-27 Chidambaram while the other candidate D. Ravikumar contested on the "Rising Sun" symbol of the Dravida Munnetra Kazhagam (DMK) in PC-13 Viluppuram and is officially recorded as a DMK candidate in electoral records.)	PMK	S. Vadivel Raavanan
14	Kallakurichi	DMK	Gautham Sigamani	DMDK	L. K. Sudhish
15	Salem	DMK	S. R. Parthiban	ADMK	K. R. S. Saravanan
16	Namakkal	DMK	A. K. P. Chinraj (Note: Kongunadu Makkal Desia Katchi (KMDK) candidate contested on the "Rising Sun" symbol of the Dravida Munnetra Kazhagam (DMK), and is officially recorded as a DMK candidate in electoral records.)	ADMK	P. Kaliappan
17	Erode	DMK	A. Ganesha Murthi (Note: Marumalarchi Dravida Munnetra Kazhagam (MDMK) candidate contested on the "Rising Sun" symbol of the Dravida Munnetra Kazhagam (DMK), and is officially recorded as a DMK candidate in electoral records.)	ADMK	G. Manimaran
18	Tiruppur	CPI	K. Subbarayan	ADMK	M. S. M. Anandan
19	Nilgiris (SC)	DMK	A. Raja	ADMK	M. Thyagarajan
20	Coimbatore	CPM	P. R. Natarajan	BJP	C. P. Radhakrishnan
21	Pollachi	DMK	K. Shamugasundaram	ADMK	C. Mahendran
22	Dindigul	DMK	P. Veluchamy	PMK	K. Jothimuthu
23	Karur	INC	S. Jothimani	ADMK	M. Thambidurai
24	Tiruchirappalli	INC	Su. Thirunavukkarasar	DMDK	V. Ilangovan
25	Perambalur	DMK	T. R. Paarivendhar (Note: Indiya Jananayaka Katchi (IJK) candidate T. R. Paarivendhar contested on the "Rising Sun" symbol of the Dravida Munnetra Kazhagam (DMK), and is officially recorded as a DMK candidate in electoral records.)	ADMK	N. R. Sivapathy
26	Cuddalore	DMK	T. R. V. S. Ramesh	PMK	R. Govindasamy
27	Chidambaram (SC)	VCK	Thol. Thirumavalavan	ADMK	P. Chandrasekar
28	Mayiladuthurai	DMK	S. Ramalingam	ADMK	S. Aasaimani
29	Nagapattinam (SC)	CPI	M. Selvarasu	ADMK	M. Saravanan
30	Thanjavur	DMK	S. S. Palanimanickam	TMC	N. R. Nadarajan
31	Sivaganga	INC	Karti Chidambaram	BJP	H. Raja
32	Madurai	CPM	S. Venkatesan	ADMK	V. V. R. Raj Satyen
33	Theni	INC	E. V. K. S. Elangovan	ADMK	P. Ravindhranath
34	Virudhunagar	INC	Manickam Tagore	DMDK	R. Azhagarsamy
35	Ramanathapuram	IUML	Navaskani	BJP	Nainar Nagendran
36	Thoothukkudi	DMK	Kanimozhi Rajathi Karunanidhi	BJP	Tamilisai Soundararajan
37	Tenkasi (SC)	DMK	Dhanush M Kumar	ADMK	K. Krishnasamy (Note: Puthiya Tamilagam (PT) candidate contested on the "Two Leaves" symbol of the All India Anna Dravida Munnetra Kazhagam (AIADMK), and is officially recorded as a AIADMK candidate in electoral records.)
38	Tirunelveli	DMK	S. Gnanathiraviam	ADMK	P. H. Paul Manoj Pandian
39	Kanniyakumari	INC	H. Vasanthakumar	BJP	Pon Radhakrishnan

=== Party/Alliance Wise Seat Matrix ===
Alliance & Party
Alliance & Party								Total (NDA)
Alliance & Party		UPA						Total (NDA)
Alliance & Party		DMK	INC	CPI	CPM	VCK	IUML	Total (NDA)
NDA								
NDA	ADMK	13	5	2	1	1	—N/a	22
NDA	PMK	7	—N/a	—N/a	—N/a	—N/a	—N/a	7
NDA	BJP	1	2	—N/a	1	—N/a	1	5
NDA	DMDK	2	2	—N/a	—N/a	—N/a	—N/a	4
NDA	TMC(M)	1	—N/a	—N/a	—N/a	—N/a	—N/a	1
Total (UPA)		24	9	2	2	1	1	39

== Opinion polls ==
Date published	Polling agency			Others	Lead
Date published	Polling agency	SPA	NDA	Others	Lead
April 2019	Times Now-VMR	53.12%	39.61%	7.27%	13.51%

Date published	Polling agency			Others	Lead
Date published	Polling agency	SPA	NDA	Others	Lead
October 2018	Spick Media	25	6	7	19
March 2019	Times Now-VMR	34	5	0	29
March 2019	News Nation	24	15	NA	9
March 2019	India TV-CNX	22	15	2	7
April 2019	People studies-Loyola College	33	3–5	1–2	28
April 2019	Thanthi TV	23–31	9–17	0	14
April 2019	Republic TV	18–19	20–21	0	2
6 April 2019	IndiaTV-CNX	21	13	5	8
8 April 2019	Times Now-VMR	33	6	0	27
8 April 2019	PuthiyaThalaimurai TV	31–33	6–8	0	27

== Exit polls ==
Polling Agency	SPA	NDA	Others
Thanthi TV	23	14	0
India Today	34–38	0–4	0
Times Now	29	9	0
People Political Predictions	25	4	9

== Voter turnout ==
Date	State/UT	No. of. Seats	Turnout (%)
18 April 2019	Tamil Nadu	39	72.44

Highest turnout in Dharmapuri constituency of 82.41% and the lowest is in Chennai South constituency of 57.07%.

== Results ==
=== Results by Party/Alliance ===
Alliance/ Party		Popular vote			Seats		
Alliance/ Party		Votes	%	±pp	Contested	Won	+/−
SPA	DMK (Note: Since VCK, IJK, MDMK, and KMDK contested on the DMK's "Rising Sun" symbol, they will be officially recognized as DMK candidates by the ECI in affidavits, and will represent the DMK in Parliament. The DMK contested 20 seats, and including these allies, the total rises to 24.)	1,43,63,332 (Note: DMK (1,19,30,166); IJK (6,83,697); MDMK (5,63,591); KMDK (6,26,293); VCK (5,59,585))	33.10 (Note: DMK (27.49%); IJK (1.58%); MDMK (1.30%); KMDK (1.44%); VCK (1.29%))	▲9.19	24 (Note: DMK (20); IJK (1); MDMK (1); KMDK (1); VCK (1))	24	▲24
SPA	INC	54,05,674	12.46	▲8.09	9	8	▲8
SPA	CPI	10,31,617	2.38	▲1.83	2	2	▲2
SPA	CPI(M)	10,19,003	2.35	▲1.80	2	2	▲2
SPA	VCK	5,00,229	1.15	▼0.36	1	1	▲1
SPA	IUML	4,69,943	1.08	▲0.57	1	1	▲1
SPA	Total	2,27,89,798	52.52	▲16.33	39	38	▲38
NDA	ADMK (Note: Since PNK and PT contested on the AIADMK's "Two Leaves" symbol, they will be officially recognized as AIADMK candidates by the ECI in affidavits. The AIADMK contested 20 seats, and including these allies, the total rises to 22.)	83,07,345 (Note: AIADMK (74,74,757); PNK (4,77,199); PT (3,55,389))	19.14 (Note: AIADMK (17.23%); PNK (1.10%); PT (0.82%))	▼24.93	22 (Note: AIADMK (20); PNK (1); PT (1))	1	▼36
NDA	PMK	22,97,431	5.29	▲0.78	7	0	▼1
NDA	BJP	15,51,924	3.58	▼1.98	5	0	▼1
NDA	DMDK	9,29,590	2.14	▼3.05	4	0	Steady
NDA	TMC(M)	2,20,849	0.51	New entry	1	0	Steady
NDA	Total	1,33,07,139	30.67	▼29.51	39	1	▼38
AMMK+	AMMK (Note: AMMK fielded its candidates as Independents under the “Gift Pack” symbol in 38 constituencies and its ally SDPI, contested one constituency under the same symbol.)	22,06,108	5.08		38	0	
AMMK+	SDPI	23,741	0.05		1	0	
AMMK+	Total	22,29,849	5.13		39	0	
NTK		16,72,217	3.85	Steady	38	0	Steady
MNM		15,75,640	3.63		36	0	Steady
Others		3,61,596	0.83	Steady	135	0	Steady
IND		9,06,846	2.09	Steady	524	0	Steady
NOTA		5,50,577	1.27	Steady			
Total		4,33,92,884	100%	-	850	39	-

== Constituency-wise Results ==
Constituency			Winner				Runner Up				Margin	%
#	Name	Poll %	Candidate	Party	Votes	%	Candidate	Party	Votes	%	Margin	%
1	Thiruvallur (SC)	72.33	K. Jeyakumar	INC	7,67,292	54.48	P. Venugopal	ADMK	4,10,337	29.14	3,56,955	25.34
2	Chennai North	64.23	K. Veeraswamy	DMK	5,90,986	61.82	R. Mohanraj	DMDK	1,29,468	13.54	4,61,518	48.28
3	Chennai South	57.05	Thamizhachi Th.	DMK	5,64,872	50.15	J. Jayavardhan	ADMK	3,02,649	26.87	2,62,223	23.28
4	Chennai Central	58.95	Dayanidhi Maran	DMK	4,48,911	57.13	S. R. Sam Paul	PMK	1,47,391	18.76	3,01,520	38.37
5	Sriperumbudur	62.43	T. R. Baalu	DMK	7,93,281	56.37	A. Vaithilingam	PMK	2,85,326	20.28	5,07,955	36.09
6	Kancheepuram (SC)	75.28	G. Selvam	DMK	6,84,004	55.24	K. Maragatham	ADMK	3,97,372	32.09	2,86,632	23.15
7	Arakkonam	78.54	S. Jagathrakshakan	DMK	6,72,190	56.98	A. K. Moorthy	PMK	3,43,234	29.09	3,28,956	27.89
8	Vellore (Note: Elections in Vellore constituency were held later in August 2019 and won by DMK.)	71.32	Kathir Anand	DMK	4,85,340	47.21	A. C. Shanmugam	ADMK	4,77,199	46.42	8,141	0.79
9	Krishnagiri	75.89	A. Chellakumar	INC	6,11,298	52.60	K. P. Munusamy	ADMK	4,54,533	39.11	1,56,765	13.49
10	Dharmapuri	82.33	S. Senthilkumar	DMK	5,74,988	46.96	Anbumani Ramadoss	PMK	5,04,235	41.18	70,753	5.78
11	Tiruvannamalai	78.14	C. N. Annadurai	DMK	6,66,272	57.85	S. S. Krishnamurthy	ADMK	3,62,085	31.44	3,04,187	26.41
12	Arani	78.94	M. K. Vishnu Prasad	INC	6,17,760	53.96	V. Elumalai	ADMK	3,86,954	33.80	2,30,806	20.16
13	Viluppuram (SC)	78.62	D.Ravikumar	DMK	5,59,585	49.25	S. Vadivel Ravanan	PMK	4,31,517	37.98	1,28,068	11.27
14	Kallakurichi	78.77	Gautham Sigamani	DMK	7,21,713	59.90	L.K. Sudhish	DMDK	3,21,794	26.71	3,99,919	33.19
15	Salem	77.86	S. R. Parthiban	DMK	6,06,302	48.26	K. R. S. Saravanan	ADMK	4,59,376	36.56	1,46,926	11.70
16	Namakkal	80.20	A. K. P. Chinraj	DMK	6,26,293	55.23	P. Kaliappan	ADMK	3,61,142	31.85	2,65,151	23.38
17	Erode	73.03	A. Ganeshamurthi	DMK	5,63,591	52.72	G. Manimaran	ADMK	3,52,973	33.02	2,10,618	19.70
18	Tiruppur	73.17	K. Subbarayan	CPI	5,08,725	45.42	M. S. M. Anandan	ADMK	4,15,357	37.08	93,368	8.34
19	Nilgiris (SC)	73.99	A. Raja	DMK	5,47,832	54.18	M. Thiyagarajan	ADMK	3,42,009	33.83	2,05,823	20.35
20	Coimbatore	63.86	P. R. Natarajan	CPM	5,71,150	45.66	C. P. Radhakrishnan	BJP	3,92,007	31.34	1,79,143	14.32
21	Pollachi	71.15	K. Shamugasundaram	DMK	5,54,230	51.23	C. Mahendran	ADMK	3,78,347	34.97	1,75,883	16.26
22	Dindigul	75.24	P. Velusamy	DMK	7,46,523	64.30	K. Jothimuthu	PMK	2,07,551	17.88	5,38,972	46.42
23	Karur	79.52	Jothimani	INC	6,95,697	63.04	M. Thambidurai	ADMK	2,75,151	24.93	4,20,546	38.11
24	Tiruchirappalli	69.46	Su. Thirunavukkarasar	INC	6,21,285	59.24	V. Elangovan	DMDK	1,61,999	15.45	4,59,286	43.79
25	Perambalur	79.23	T. R. Paarivendhar	DMK	6,83,697	61.98	N. R. Sivapathi	ADMK	2,80,179	25.40	4,03,518	36.58
26	Cuddalore	76.48	T. R. V. S. Ramesh	DMK	5,22,160	50.05	R. Govindasamy	PMK	3,78,177	36.25	1,43,983	13.80
27	Chidambaram (SC)	77.91	Thol. Thirumavalavan	VCK	5,00,229	43.34	P. Chandrasekar	ADMK	4,97,010	43.06	3,219	0.28
28	Mayiladuthurai	73.90	S. Ramalingam	DMK	5,99,292	54.59	S. Asaimani	ADMK	3,37,978	30.79	2,61,314	23.80
29	Nagapattinam (SC)	76.88	M. Selvarasu	CPI	5,22,892	52.14	M. Saravanan	ADMK	3,11,539	31.06	2,11,353	21.08
30	Thanjavur	72.50	S. S. Palanimanickam	DMK	5,88,978	55.56	N. R. Natarajan	TMC	2,20,849	20.83	3,68,129	34.73
31	Sivaganga	69.87	Karti Chidambaram	INC	5,66,104	52.18	H. Raja	BJP	2,33,860	21.56	3,32,244	30.62
32	Madurai	66.02	Su. Venkatesan	CPM	4,47,075	43.95	Raj Satyen	ADMK	3,07,680	30.25	1,39,395	13.70
33	Theni	75.17	P. Ravindhranath	ADMK	5,04,813	42.96	E. V. K. S. Elangovan	INC	4,28,120	36.44	76,693	6.52
34	Virudhunagar	72.41	Manickam Tagore	INC	4,70,883	43.77	R. Alagarsamy	DMDK	3,16,329	29.40	1,54,554	14.37
35	Ramanathapuram	68.35	Navas Kani	IUML	4,69,943	44.05	Nainar Nagendran	BJP	3,42,821	32.13	1,27,122	11.92
36	Thoothukkudi	69.43	Kanimozhi Rajathi Karunanidhi	DMK	5,63,143	56.77	Tamilisai	BJP	2,15,934	21.77	3,47,209	35.00
37	Tenkasi (SC)	71.37	Dhanush Kumar	DMK	4,76,156	44.67	K. Krishnasamy	ADMK	3,55,389	33.34	1,20,767	11.33
38	Tirunelveli	67.21	S. Gnanathiraviam	DMK	5,22,993	50.27	P. H. Manoj Pandian	ADMK	3,37,273	32.42	1,85,720	17.85
39	Kanniyakumari	69.83	H. Vasanthakumar	INC	6,27,235	59.77	P. Radhakrishnan	BJP	3,67,302	35.00	2,59,933	24.77

== By-Polls Held ==
Constituency			Winner				Runner Up				Margin
No.	Name	Date	Candidate	Party	Votes	%	Candidate	Party	Votes	%	Margin
39	Kanniyakumari	30 October 2021	Vijay Vasanth	INC	576,037	52.50	Pon. Radhakrishnan	BJP	438,087	39.92	137,950
39	Kanniyakumari	30 October 2021	The Kanniyakumari Lok Sabha bypoll was held following the death of the incumbent MP, H. Vasanthakumar.								

== Direction Tamil Nadu result ==
=== Northern Tamil Nadu ===
Sr.no	Seats Won		
1.	Thiruvallur (SC)	K. Jeyakumar	Indian National Congress
2.	Chennai North	Kalanidhi Veeraswamy	Dravida Munnetra Kazhagam
3.	Chennai South	Thamizhachi Thangapandian	Dravida Munnetra Kazhagam
4.	Chennai Central	Dayanidhi Maran	Dravida Munnetra Kazhagam
5.	Sriperumbudur	T R Baalu	Dravida Munnetra Kazhagam
6.	Kancheepuram (SC)	G. Selvam	Dravida Munnetra Kazhagam
7.	Arakkonam	S. Jagathrakshakan	Dravida Munnetra Kazhagam
8.	Vellore	D. M. Kathir Anand	Dravida Munnetra Kazhagam
9.	Tiruvannamalai	Annadurai C N	Dravida Munnetra Kazhagam
10.	Kallakurichi	Pon. Gautham Sigamani	Dravida Munnetra Kazhagam
11.	Villupuram (SC)	D. Ravikumar	Viduthalai Chiruthaigal Katchi
12	Arani	Dr. M. K. Vishnu Prasad	Indian National Congress

=== Western Tamil Nadu ===
Sr.no	Seats Won		
1.	Krishnagiri	A. Chellakumar	Indian National Congress
2.	Dharmapuri	Dr. S. Senthil Kumar	Dravida Munnetra Kazhagam
3.	Salem	S. R. Parthiban	Dravida Munnetra Kazhagam
4.	Namakkal	A. K. P. Chinraj	Dravida Munnetra Kazhagam
5.	Erode	A. Ganesha Murthi	Dravida Munnetra Kazhagam
6.	Tiruppur	K. Subbarayan	Communist Party of India
7.	Coimbatore	P.R. Natarajan	Communist Party of India (Marxist)
8.	Nilgiris (SC)	A Raja	Dravida Munnetra Kazhagam
9.	Karur	S.Jothimani	Indian National Congress
10.	Pollachi	K. Shamugasundaram	Dravida Munnetra Kazhagam

=== Southern Tamil Nadu ===
Sr.no	Seats Won		
1.	Dindigul	P. Veluchamy	Dravida Munnetra Kazhagam
2.	Madurai	S. Venkatesan	Communist Party of India (Marxist)
3.	Sivaganga	Karti P Chidambaram	Indian National Congress
4.	Virudhunagar	Manickam Tagore	Indian National Congress
5.	Theni	P. Ravindhranath	All India Anna Dravida Munnetra Kazhagam
6.	Ramanathapuram	Navaskani	Indian Union Muslim League
7.	Thoothukkudi	Kanimozhi Rajathi Karunanidhi	Dravida Munnetra Kazhagam
8.	Tenkasi (SC)	Dhanush M Kumar	Dravida Munnetra Kazhagam
9.	Tirunelveli	S. Gnanathiraviam	Dravida Munnetra Kazhagam
10.	Kanniyakumari	H. Vasanthakumar	Indian National Congress

=== Central Tamil Nadu ===
Sr.no	Seats Won		
1.	Tiruchirappalli	Su. Thirunavukkarasar	Indian National Congress
2.	Perambalur	T. R. Paarivendhar	Dravida Munnetra Kazhagam
3.	Cuddalore	T.R.V.S. Ramesh	Dravida Munnetra Kazhagam
4.	Chidambaram (SC)	Thol. Thirumavalavan	Viduthalai Chiruthaigal Katchi
5.	Mayiladuthurai	S. Ramalingam	Dravida Munnetra Kazhagam
6.	Thanjavur	S S Palanimanickam	Dravida Munnetra Kazhagam
7.	Nagapattinam (SC)	M. Selvarasu	Communist Party of India

== Assembly segments-wise lead of parties ==

Party	Assembly segments	Position in Assembly (as of 2021 election)
Dravida Munnetra Kazhagam	138	133
All India Anna Dravida Munnetra Kazhagam	12	66
Bharatiya Janata Party	1	4
Indian National Congress	49	18
Communist Party of India	12	2
Communist Party of India (Marxist)	12	2
Indian Union Muslim League	5	0
Pattali Makkal Katchi	3	5
Viduthalai Chiruthaigal Katchi	2	4
Total	234	

== Assembly Seat wise leads ==
Constituency		Winner		Runner-up		Margin
#	Name	Party	Votes	Party	Votes	Margin
Thiruvallur Lok Sabha constituency
1	Gummidipoondi	INC	118,338	AIADMK	65,570	52,768
2	Ponneri (SC)	INC	113,960	AIADMK	36,541	77,419
4	Thiruvallur	INC	104,304	AIADMK	68,106	36,198
5	Poonamallee (SC)	INC	127,931	AIADMK	86,698	41,233
6	Avadi	INC	146,058	AIADMK	66,620	79,438
9	Madavaram	INC	153,502	AIADMK	65,739	87,763
Chennai North Lok Sabha constituency
10	Thiruvottiyur	DMK	110,107	DMDK	26,732	83,375
11	R. K. Nagar	DMK	103,277	DMDK	21,920	81,357
12	Perambur	DMK	117,074	DMDK	26,759	90,315
13	Kolathur	DMK	103,527	MNM	21,576	81,951
15	Thiru. Vi. Ka. Nagar (SC)	DMK	85,062	DMDK	16,586	68,476
17	Royapuram	DMK	69,987	DMDK	15,815	54,172
Chennai South Lok Sabha constituency
22	Virugampakkam	DMK	78,535	AIADMK	42,483	36,052
23	Saidapet	DMK	84,928	AIADMK	35,069	49,859
24	Thiyagarayanagar	DMK	57,232	AIADMK	45,498	11,734
25	Mylapore	DMK	74,236	AIADMK	42,457	31,779
26	Velachery	DMK	83,352	AIADMK	48,618	34,734
27	Shozhinganallur	DMK	184,957	AIADMK	88,027	96,930
Chennai Central Lok Sabha constituency
14	Villivakkam	DMK	81,203	PMK	22,592	58,611
16	Egmore	DMK	68,481	PMK	20,282	48,199
18	Harbour	DMK	53,760	PMK	22,848	30,912
19	Chepauk-Thiruvallikeni	DMK	82,129	PMK	21,304	60,825
20	Thousand Lights	DMK	75,027	PMK	27,254	47,773
21	Anna Nagar	DMK	86,550	PMK	32,533	54,017
Sriperumbudur Lok Sabha constituency
7	Maduravoyal	DMK	135,901	PMK	47,171	88,730
8	Ambattur	DMK	124,395	PMK	42,365	82,030
28	Alandur	DMK	119,158	PMK	47,161	71,997
29	Sriperumbudur	DMK	148,930	PMK	49,150	99,780
30	Pallavaram	DMK	137,116	PMK	51,180	85,936
31	Tambaram	DMK	125,250	PMK	47,646	77,604
Kancheepuram Lok Sabha constituency
32	Chengalpattu	DMK	147,633	AIADMK	69,898	77,735
33	Thiruporur	DMK	114,734	AIADMK	76,540	38,194
34	Cheyyur (SC)	DMK	90,330	AIADMK	53,858	36,472
35	Madhuranthakam (SC)	DMK	95,662	AIADMK	59,243	36,419
36	Uthiramerur	DMK	108,548	AIADMK	67,014	41,534
37	Kancheepuram	DMK	123,180	AIADMK	69,879	53,301
Arakkonam Lok Sabha constituency
3	Tiruttani	DMK	136,982	PMK	51,533	85,449
38	Arakkonam (SC)	DMK	94,671	PMK	46,558	48,113
39	Sholinghur	DMK	100,419	PMK	87,274	13,145
40	Katpadi	DMK	99,743	PMK	46,651	53,092
41	Ranipet	DMK	116,957	PMK	53,843	63,114
42	Arcot	DMK	117,916	PMK	55,668	62,248
Vellore Lok Sabha constituency
43	Vellore	DMK	78,901	AIADMK	72,626	6,275
44	Anaikattu	AIADMK	88,770	DMK	79,231	9,539
45	K. V. Kuppam (SC)	AIADMK	80,100	DMK	71,991	8,109
46	Gudiyattam	AIADMK	94,178	DMK	82,887	11,291
47	Vaniyambadi	DMK	92,599	AIADMK	70,248	22,531
48	Ambur	DMK	79,371	AIADMK	70,768	8,603
Krishnagiri Lok Sabha constituency
51	Uthangarai (SC)	INC	102,142	AIADMK	62,679	39,463
52	Bargur	INC	101,128	AIADMK	69,015	32,113
53	Krishnagiri	INC	110,326	AIADMK	71,147	39,179
54	Veppanahalli	INC	100,421	AIADMK	75,651	24,770
55	Hosur	INC	108,476	AIADMK	97,538	10,938
56	Thalli	INC	86,903	AIADMK	77,358	9,545
Dharmapuri Lok Sabha constituency
57	Palacode	DMK	97,927	PMK	75,523	22,404
58	Pennagaram	PMK	88,794	DMK	88,506	288
59	Dharmapuri	PMK	94,731	DMK	87,276	7,455
60	Pappireddipatti	PMK	94,029	DMK	91,332	2,697
61	Harur (SC)	DMK	104,942	PMK	65,072	39,870
85	Mettur	DMK	98,327	PMK	82,864	15,463
Tiruvannamalai Lok Sabha constituency
49	Jolarpet	DMK	98,248	AIADMK	61,861	36,387
50	Tirupattur	DMK	101,040	AIADMK	54,670	46,370
62	Chengam	DMK	118,627	AIADMK	70,437	48,190
63	Tiruvannamalai	DMK	121,927	AIADMK	51,634	70,293
64	Kilpennathur	DMK	114,622	AIADMK	59,758	54,864
65	Kalasapakkam	DMK	107,255	AIADMK	61,896	45,359
Arani Lok Sabha constituency
66	Polur	INC	101,297	AIADMK	63,705	37,592
67	Arani	INC	106,291	AIADMK	72,577	33,714
68	Cheyyar	INC	114,551	AIADMK	65,587	48,964
69	Vandavasi	INC	98,788	AIADMK	56,665	42,123
70	Gingee	INC	104,104	AIADMK	66,888	37,216
71	Mailam	INC	88,359	AIADMK	59,882	28,477
Viluppuram Lok Sabha constituency (SC)
72	Tindivanam (SC)	DMK	86,805	PMK	66,143	20,662
73	Vanur (SC)	DMK	87,803	PMK	66,912	20,891
74	Viluppuram	DMK	87,989	PMK	74,901	13,088
75	Vikravandi	DMK	83,432	PMK	74,819	8,613
76	Tirukkoyilur	DMK	92,248	PMK	65,402	26,846
77	Ulundurpet	DMK	118,398	PMK	81,914	36,484
Kallakurichi Lok Sabha constituency
78	Rishivandiyam	DMK	116,052	DMDK	55,639	60,413
79	Sankarapuram	DMK	117,632	DMDK	59,098	58,534
80	Kallakurichi (SC)	DMK	120,368	DMDK	62,829	57,539
81	Gangavalli (SC)	DMK	109,201	DMDK	44,051	65,150
82	Attur (SC)	DMK	116,290	DMDK	45,236	71,054
83	Yercaud (ST)	DMK	137,418	DMDK	54,151	83,267
Salem Lok Sabha constituency
84	Omalur	DMK	118,846	AIADMK	85,551	33,295
86	Edappadi	DMK	104,573	AIADMK	96,485	8,088
88	Salem West	DMK	101,647	AIADMK	72,314	29,333
89	Salem North	DMK	91,113	AIADMK	63,170	27,943
90	Salem South	DMK	87,863	AIADMK	65,740	22,123
91	Veerapandi	DMK	98,411	AIADMK	74,858	23,553
Namakkal Lok Sabha constituency
87	Sankagiri	DMK	116,572	AIADMK	75,047	41,525
92	Rasipuram (SC)	DMK	106,705	AIADMK	56,269	50,436
93	Senthamangalam	DMK	108,630	AIADMK	59,134	49,496
94	Namakkal	DMK	110,790	AIADMK	55,705	55,085
95	Paramathi Velur	DMK	87,597	AIADMK	59,887	27,710
96	Tiruchengode	DMK	92,973	AIADMK	53,499	39,474
Erode Lok Sabha constituency
97	Kumarapalayam	DMK	86,683	AIADMK	65,323	21,360
98	Erode East	DMK	79,582	AIADMK	43,076	36,506
99	Erode West	DMK	97,879	AIADMK	59,764	38,115
100	Modakkurichi	DMK	97,948	AIADMK	55,541	42,407
101	Dharapuram (SC)	DMK	98,368	AIADMK	64,562	33,806
102	Kangayam	DMK	98,469	AIADMK	64,062	34,407
Tiruppur Lok Sabha constituency
103	Perundurai	CPI	76,788	AIADMK	72,136	4,652
104	Bhavani	CPI	88,781	AIADMK	71,207	17,754
105	Anthiyur	CPI	80,494	AIADMK	62,232	18,262
106	Gobichettipalayam	CPI	88,789	AIADMK	78,830	9,959
113	Tiruppur North	CPI	93,134	AIADMK	78,514	14,620
114	Tiruppur South	CPI	77,807	AIADMK	51,863	25,944
Nilgiris Lok Sabha constituency
107	Bhavanisagar	DMK	104,040	AIADMK	68,033	36,007
108	Udagamandalam	DMK	83,682	AIADMK	38,236	45,446
109	Gudalur	DMK	79,779	AIADMK	39,961	39,818
110	Coonoor	DMK	76,047	AIADMK	42,086	33,961
111	Mettuppalyam	DMK	107,321	AIADMK	76,509	30,812
112	Avanashi	DMK	94,594	AIADMK	76,824	17,770
Coimbatore Lok Sabha constituency
115	Palladam	CPI(M)	114,653	BJP	73,478	41,175
116	Sulur	CPI(M)	94,603	BJP	74,883	19,720
117	Kavundampalayam	CPI(M)	125,419	BJP	85,961	39,458
118	Coimbatore North	CPI(M)	83,370	BJP	57,158	26,212
120	Coimbatore South	CPI(M)	64,453	BJP	46,368	18,085
121	Singanallur	CPI(M)	85,243	BJP	52,975	32,268
Pollachi Lok Sabha constituency
119	Thondamuthur	DMK	96,218	AIADMK	75,127	21,091
122	Kinathukadavu	DMK	102,921	AIADMK	71,941	30,980
123	Pollachi	DMK	84,848	AIADMK	59,042	25,806
124	Valparai	DMK	77,910	AIADMK	48,414	29,496
125	Udumalaipet	DMK	101,196	AIADMK	60,564	40,632
126	Madathukulam	DMK	87,812	AIADMK	62,458	25,354
Dindigul Lok Sabha constituency
127	Palani	DMK	124,038	PMK	31,955	92,083
128	Oddanchatram	DMK	126,187	PMK	27,599	98,588
129	Athoor	DMK	154,711	PMK	27,717	126,994
130	Nilakottai	DMK	93,983	PMK	62,701	31,282
131	Natham	DMK	134,891	PMK	30,181	104,710
132	Dindigul	DMK	110,003	PMK	26,629	83,374
Karur Lok Sabha constituency
133	Vedasandur	INC	118,072	AIADMK	55,258	62,814
134	Aravakurichi	INC	112,667	AIADMK	37,518	75,149
135	Karur	INC	111,333	AIADMK	48,616	62,717
136	Krishnarayapuram (SC)	INC	110,533	AIADMK	44,315	66,218
138	Manapparai	INC	132,561	AIADMK	48,644	83,917
179	Viralimalai	INC	106,352	AIADMK	40,104	66,248
Tiruchirappalli Lok Sabha constituency
139	Srirangam	INC	118,663	DMDK	50,128	68,525
140	Trichy West	INC	106,407	DMDK	22,606	83,801
141	Trichy East	INC	97,783	DMDK	25,283	72,500
142	Thiruverumbur	INC	106,480	DMDK	28,636	77,844
178	Gandharvakottai	INC	88,020	AMMK	22,822	65,198
180	Pudukkottai	INC	98,314	AMMK	22,611	75,703
Perambalur Lok Sabha constituency
137	Kulithalai	DMK	122,410	AIADMK	45,034	77,376
143	Lalgudi	DMK	100,300	AIADMK	41,711	58,589
144	Manachanallur	DMK	103,783	AIADMK	50,046	53,737
145	Musiri	DMK	103,204	AIADMK	46,261	56,943
146	Thuraiyur (SC)	DMK	100,885	AIADMK	43,428	57,457
147	Perambalur (SC)	DMK	146,423	AIADMK	52,959	93,464
Cuddalore Lok Sabha constituency
151	Tittagudi (SC)	DMK	85,373	PMK	49,757	35,616
152	Vridhachalam	DMK	88,883	PMK	66,857	22,026
153	Neyveli	DMK	72,889	PMK	62,411	10,478
154	Panruti	DMK	95,879	PMK	68,904	26,975
155	Cuddalore	DMK	84,262	PMK	53,590	30,672
156	Kurinjipadi	DMK	92,308	PMK	75,109	17,199
Chidambaram Lok Sabha constituency (SC)
148	Kunnam	AIADMK	87,938	VCK	86,488	1,350
149	Ariyalur	AIADMK	90,319	VCK	85,678	4,641
150	Jayankondam	AIADMK	100,537	VCK	75,501	25,036
157	Bhuvanagiri	AIADMK	85,180	VCK	83,950	1,230
158	Chidambaram	VCK	75,334	AIADMK	71,240	4,094
159	Kattumannarkovil (SC)	VCK	91,450	AIADMK	60,218	31,232
Mayiladuthurai Lok Sabha constituency
160	Sirkazhi (SC)	DMK	97,068	AIADMK	57,555	39,513
161	Mayiladuthurai	DMK	93,059	AIADMK	51,906	41,153
162	Poompuhar	DMK	103,666	AIADMK	65,071	38,595
170	Thiruvidaimarudur (SC)	DMK	101,169	AIADMK	59,839	41,330
171	Kumbakonam	DMK	97,809	AIADMK	53,050	44,759
172	Papanasam	DMK	103,074	AIADMK	50,027	53,047
Nagapattinam Lok Sabha constituency (SC)
163	Nagapattinam	CPI	70,089	AIADMK	42,381	27,708
164	Kilvelur	CPI	69,511	AIADMK	46,273	23,238
165	Vedharanyam	CPI	67,376	AIADMK	48,948	18,428
166	Thiruthuraipoondi	CPI	96,929	AIADMK	46,175	50,754
168	Thiruvarur	CPI	107,632	AIADMK	65,186	42,446
169	Nannilam	CPI	108,059	AIADMK	62,051	46,008
Thanjavur Lok Sabha constituency
167	Mannargudi	DMK	96,047	TMC(M)	35,387	60,660
173	Thiruvaiyaru	DMK	111,242	TMC(M)	43,373	67,869
174	Thanjavur	DMK	110,132	TMC(M)	35,787	74,345
175	Orathanadu	DMK	89,502	TMC(M)	32,381	57,121
176	Pattukkottai	DMK	89,826	TMC(M)	36,968	52,858
177	Peravurani	DMK	86,872	TMC(M)	36,521	50,351
Sivagangai Lok Sabha constituency
181	Thirumayam	INC	84,093	BJP	41,405	42,688
182	Alangudi	INC	93,497	BJP	32,438	61,059
184	Karaikudi	INC	100,249	BJP	33,400	66,849
185	Thiruppathur	INC	102,894	BJP	32,227	70,667
186	Sivagangai	INC	85,610	BJP	32,630	52,980
187	Manamadurai (SC)	INC	97,659	BJP	61,195	36,464
Madurai Lok Sabha constituency
188	Melur	CPI(M)	69,777	AIADMK	54,946	14,831
189	Madurai East	CPI(M)	97,859	AIADMK	63,059	34,800
191	Madurai North	CPI(M)	70,866	AIADMK	41,958	28,908
192	Madurai South	CPI(M)	51,618	AIADMK	51,195	423
193	Madurai Central	CPI(M)	72,010	AIADMK	40,667	31,343
194	Madurai West	CPI(M)	82,022	AIADMK	55,208	26,814
Theni Lok Sabha constituency
190	Sholavandhan	AIADMK	81,652	INC	58,858	22,794
197	Usilampatti	AIADMK	88,207	INC	64,062	24,145
198	Andipatti	AIADMK	82,499	INC	76,428	6,071
199	Periyakulam (SC)	INC	81,799	AIADMK	75,348	6,451
200	Bodinayakkanur	AIADMK	94,279	INC	67,791	26,488
201	Cumbum	AIADMK	81,474	INC	76,847	4,627
Virudhunagar Lok Sabha constituency
195	Thiruparankundram	INC	84,664	DMDK	59,538	25,126
196	Thirumangalam	INC	88,629	DMDK	59,616	29,013
204	Sattur	INC	83,075	DMDK	63,411	19,664
205	Sivakasi	INC	80,863	DMDK	43,158	37,705
206	Virudhunagar	INC	64,519	DMDK	42,189	22,330
207	Aruppukkottai	INC	62,917	DMDK	47,143	15,774
Ramanathapuram Lok Sabha constituency
183	Aranthangi	IUML	79,337	BJP	35,675	43,662
208	Thiruchuli	IUML	69,490	BJP	45,569	23,921
209	Paramakudi	BJP	81,676	IUML	65,263	16,413
210	Thiruvadanai	IUML	85,007	BJP	53,529	31,478
211	Ramanathapuram	IUML	88,543	BJP	73,078	15,465
212	Mudukulathur	IUML	79,945	BJP	51,687	28,258
Thoothukudi Lok Sabha constituency
213	Vilathikulam	DMK	79,039	BJP	56,312	22,727
214	Thoothukudi	DMK	108,772	BJP	32,665	76,107
215	Tiruchendur	DMK	99,096	BJP	34,940	64,156
216	Srivaikundam	DMK	90,540	BJP	31,159	59,381
217	Ottapidaram (SC)	DMK	92,954	BJP	27,373	65,581
218	Kovilpatti	DMK	89,944	BJP	32,048	57,896
Tenkasi Lok Sabha constituency
202	Rajapalayam	DMK	67,408	AIADMK	57,215	10,193
203	Srivilliputhur	DMK	78,840	AIADMK	58,262	20,578
219	Sankarankovil	DMK	73,002	AIADMK	54,797	18,205
220	Vasudevanallur (SC)	DMK	74,670	AIADMK	50,873	23,797
221	Kadayanallur	DMK	86,048	AIADMK	63,070	22,978
222	Tenkasi	DMK	90,378	AIADMK	69,518	20,860
Thirunelveli Lok Sabha constituency
223	Alangulam	DMK	91,229	AIADMK	71,125	20,104
224	Thirunelveli	DMK	84,795	AIADMK	61,677	23,118
225	Ambasamuthiram	DMK	79,335	AIADMK	58,648	20,687
226	Palayamkottai	DMK	87,192	AIADMK	34,755	52,437
227	Nanguneri	DMK	86,306	AIADMK	51,596	34,710
228	Radhapuram	DMK	88,735	AIADMK	58,269	30,466
Kanniyakumari Lok Sabha constituency
229	Kanniyakumari	INC	110,996	BJP	82,295	28,701
230	Nagercoil	INC	84,924	BJP	74,500	10,424
231	Colachal	INC	106,580	BJP	60,072	46,508
232	Padmanabhapuram	INC	102,863	BJP	53,212	49,651
233	Vilavancode	INC	106,044	BJP	52,289	53,755
234	Killiyur	INC	112,950	BJP	42,230	70,720

== See also ==
- 2019 Indian general election in Puducherry
- Elections in Tamil Nadu
