= M. Krishnasamy =

Indian politician

President of Tamil Nadu Congress Committee
- In office February 2006 – July 2008
- Preceded by: G. K. Vasan
- Succeeded by: K. V. Thangkabalu

Member of Parliament, Lok Sabha
- In office 2009–2014
- Preceded by: Constituency established
- Succeeded by: V. Elumalai
- Constituency: Arani
- In office 1991–1996
- Preceded by: L. Balaraman
- Succeeded by: L. Balaraman
- Constituency: Vandavasi

Personal details
- Born: 9 June 1940 (age 86) Melappattu, Tiruvannamalai
- Party: Indian National Congress
- Spouse: K. V. Chitra (m. 1966)
- Children: Sowmiya; M. K. Vishnu Prasad
- Parent: A. Muruga Gounder (father)
- Relatives: Anbumani Ramadoss (son-in-law)
- Education: Sir Thiyagaraja College, Madras (BA); Madras Law College (BL)

Muruga Gounder Krishnasamy is an Indian politician and was member of the Parliament of India from Arani Constituency. He represented the Indian National Congress party. He also Served as the President of Tamil Nadu Congress Committee from 2006 to 2008.

His daughter Sowmiya is the wife of former Union Minister of Health and Family Welfare Anbumani. And his son Vishnu Prasad was a Member of the Tamil Nadu Legislative Assembly from Cheyyar, and a Member of Parliament from Arani and later from Cuddalore. His father-in law is Former Tiruttani MLA K. Vinayagam.
