= R. Sabarinathan =

Indian politician (born 1996)

Rajendran Sabarinathan (born 1996) is an Indian politician from Tamil Nadu. He is a member of the Tamil Nadu Legislative Assembly from Virugampakkam Assembly constituency in Chennai district representing Tamilaga Vettri Kazhagam.

== Early life and education ==
Sabarinathan is from Virugambakkam, Chennai, Tamil Nadu. He is the son of C. Rajendran, who is a long-time driver and personal aide of TVK chief Vijay. He did his schooling at Vedha Vikas Matriculation Higher Secondary School, Chennai passing out in 2013 and later did a Diploma in Mechanical Engineering in 2016. He completed his B.Tech in mechanical engineering in 2021 at Dr. M.G.R Educational and Research Institute. He declared assets worth Rs.25 lakhs in the affidavit to the Election Commission of India.

== Career ==
Sabarinathan became an MLA for the first time winning on debut in the 2026 Tamil Nadu Legislative Assembly election from Virugampakkam Assembly constituency representing Tamilaga Vettri Kazhagam. He polled 76,092 votes and defeated his nearest opponent, A. M. V. Prabhakara Raja of Dravida Munnetra Kazhagam, by a margin of 27,086 votes.
