= M. K. Vishnu Prasad =

Indian politician (born 1972)

M.K.Vishnu Prasad
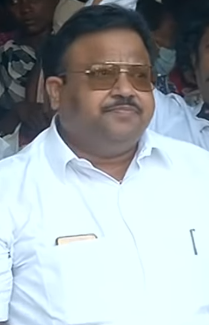

Working President, Tamil Nadu Congress Committee
- Incumbent
- Assumed office 2 February 2019

Member of Parliament, Lok Sabha
- Incumbent
- Assumed office 4 June 2024
- Preceded by: T. R. V. S. Ramesh
- Constituency: Cuddalore
- In office 23 May 2019 – 4 June 2024
- Preceded by: V. Elumalai
- Succeeded by: M. S. Tharanivendhan
- Constituency: Arani

Member of the Tamil Nadu Legislative Assembly
- In office 11 May 2006 – 13 May 2011
- Preceded by: P. S. Ulagarakshagan
- Succeeded by: N. Subramaniyam
- Constituency: Cheyyar

Personal details
- Born: 8 July 1972 (age 54) Chennai
- Party: Indian National Congress
- Spouse: Sangeetha (m. 1995)
- Children: 1 son and 1 daughter
- Parents: M. Krishnasamy (father); K. V. Chitra (mother)
- Relatives: Sowmiya (sister); Anbumani (brother-in-law)
- Education: Madras Medical College, Tamil Nadu Dr. M.G.R. Medical University (MBBS)
- Occupation: Doctor, Politician and Social worker

Muruga Gounder Krishnasamy Vishnu Prasad (8 July 1972) is an Indian politician from Tamil Nadu, India. He is the working president of Tamil Nadu Congress Committee of Indian National Congress party. He was a former Tamil Nadu Youth Congress president for the year 2003.

== Early life and education ==
Prasad is born in Chennai to M. Krishnasamy and K. V. Chitra. He married V. Sangeetha. He completed MBBS at Madras Medical College, Chennai, and is a practicing doctor.

== Career ==
M. K. Vishnu Prasad was the organizing secretary, and later president of the Tamil Nadu Youth Congress from 2003 to 2006. He was elected as a member to the 13th Tamil Nadu Legislative Assembly from Cheyyar Assembly constituency in Tiruvannamalai district of Tamil Nadu, from 2006–2011.

During his period as a MLA of Cheyyar Constituency, he was instrumental in establishing the Cheyyar SIPCOT Industrial park, which now provides employment to over 30,000 people.

He won the 2019 Indian general election from Arani Lok Sabha constituency representing Indian National Congress and was elected to the 17th Lok Sabha. He won from the Cuddalore Lok Sabha constituency as an INC candidate in the 2024 Indian general election. He is the working president of the Tamil Nadu Congress Committee.
