= Sowmiya Anbumani =

Indian environmental activist

Member of the Tamil Nadu Legislative Assembly
- Incumbent
- Assumed office 6 May 2026
- Preceded by: S. P. Venkateshwaran
- Constituency: Dharmapuri

Personal details
- Born: 1971 (age 54–55) Chennai, Tamil Nadu, India
- Party: Pattali Makkal Katchi
- Spouse: Anbumani Ramadoss (m. 1991)
- Children: 3 daughters
- Parents: M. Krishnasamy (father); K. V. Chitra (mother)
- Relatives: M. K. Vishnu Prasad (brother)
- Education: Stella Maris College, University of Madras (BA); University of Madras (MA); Madurai Kamaraj University (PhD)
- Occupation: Businesswoman, Politician

Sowmiya Anbumani (born 1971) is an Indian politician and environmental activist from Tamil Nadu. She is a Member of the Legislative Assembly from Dharmapuri Assembly constituency representing Pattali Makkal Katchi.

== Early life and education ==
Sowmiya was born in Chennai. Her father M. Krishnasamy, was a lawyer and former Tamil Nadu state Congress president and a former MP. Her mother K. V. Chitra was a sociologist. Her maternal grandfather, K. Vinayakam was a Congress MLA from Tiruttani. She married Anbumani Ramadoss, the senior leader of the Patali Makkal Katchi and together they have three daughters. She went to Hindu Senior Secondary School in Triplicane and completed her schooling at Adarsh Vidyalaya. She did her graduation at Stella Maris College, Chennai in sociology and passed out in 1990. After her post-graduation at Madras University in 1992, she did her doctoral studies in Sociology and Environmental Sciences after some gap, at the Madurai Kamaraj University in 2019.

== Career ==
Sowmiya is an environmental activist and a sociologist. She has been editing a Tamil monthly environmental magazine, Pasumai Thayagam Sutru Choozal, since 2002. She also serves as an advisor to Makkal TV.

She attended many conferences as an environmentalist. They include the Earth Summit held in 2002 in Johannesburg in South Africa and the United Nations Conferences on Women held in 2006 and 2018 in New York, USA. She also went to the Climate Change Summit at Copenhagen, Denmark in 2009 and the Better Air Quality Conference at Hong Kong in 2012.

She won the Dharmapuri Assembly constituency in the 2026 Tamil Nadu Legislative Assembly election on PMK ticket. Her main opponent is expected to be V Ilangovan of Premalatha Vijayakanth's DMDK. She also contested from Dharmapuri Lok Sabha constituency in the 2024 Lok Sabha election on PMK ticket. She has declared her personal assets as ₹68.5 crore in her affidavit to the Election Commission of India. She was part of a poll by a news outlet that alleged family politics.

== Electoral History ==
=== Legislative Assembly ===
Year	Constituency	Party	Votes	%	Opponent	Party	Votes	%	Result	Margin	%
2026	Dharmapuri	PMK	93,713	39.28	M. Sivan	TVK	72,817	30.52	Won	+20,896	+8.76

=== Lok Sabha ===
Year	Constituency	Party	Votes	%	Opponent	Party	Votes	%	Result	Margin	%
2024	Dharmapuri	PMK	4,11,367	32.97	A. Mani	DMK	4,32,667	34.67	Lost	-21,300	-1.70
