= Amma Makkal Munnetra Kazhagam =

Indian political party

- Abbreviation: AMMK
- President: C. Shanmugavelu
- General Secretary: T. T. V. Dhinakaran
- Treasurer: M. Karikalan
- Founder: T. T. V. Dhinakaran
- Founded: 15 March 2018; 8 years ago
- Split from: All India Anna Dravida Munnetra Kazhagam
- Headquarters: 21/11, 1st Main Road, Karpagam Gardens, Adyar, Chennai – 600020, Tamil Nadu, India.
- Student wing: AMMK Student Wing
- Youth wing: Puratchi Thalaivar M.G.R. Youth Wing
- Women's wing: AMMK Women's Wing
- Labour wing: Idhayadheivam Amma Trade Union Federation
- Peasant's wing: AMMK Peasant's Wing
- Colours: Green
- ECI status: Registered-Unrecognized
- Alliance: National Alliance NDA: (2024–2025), (2026–present); Regional Alliance AIADMK-led Alliance: (2026–present)
- Seats in Rajya Sabha: 0 / 245
- Seats in Lok Sabha: 0 / 543
- Seats in Tamil Nadu Legislative Assembly: 0 / 234

Website
- www.ammk.com

The Amma Makkal Munnetra Kazhagam (transl. Amma People Progressive Federation; abbr. AMMK) is an Indian regional political party in the state of Tamil Nadu. It is founded by the former member of parliament T. T. V. Dhinakaran at Melur on 15 March 2018 as a breakaway faction of the All India Anna Dravida Munnetra Kazhagam after his expulsion from the party. The headquarters of the party is located at Karpagam Gardens, Adyar, Chennai.

== History ==
=== RK Nagar by-election ===
In December 2017, Dinakaran contested the RK Nagar by-election and won by a huge margin of 40,707 votes. He became the first independent candidate to win a by-poll in Tamil Nadu. This was the first time in 18 years that a ruling party in the state had lost a by-election.

=== Formation ===
Before being imprisoned in the Central Prison in Bangalore, Sasikala appointed Edappadi K. Palanisamy as Chief Minister of Tamil Nadu. Palanisamy and other ministers removed her from the post and expelled her from the party in September 2017. On 21 August 2017, it was reported that the AIADMK faction loyal to Palaniswami had decided to merge with Panneerselvam's splinter faction and expelled Sasikala as the general secretary as one of the key demands of the merger. It was reported on 28 August that Sasikala had been expelled during a party meeting, but this was later denied.

On 13 September, the AIADMK General Council cancelled Sasikala's appointment as interim general secretary and expelled her from the party, though officials appointed to party posts by her were allowed to continue their duties. Instead, the late Jayalalithaa was named the eternal general secretary of AIADMK.

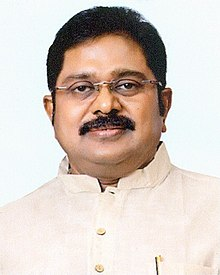
T.T.V. Dhinakaran
Founder of the party

On 15 March 2018 at a public meeting in Madurai, TTV Dinakaran launched the party flag and named the party "Amma Makkal Munnetra Kazhagam" after the AIADMK expelled him as well as his aunt V. K. Sasikala. Sasikala and Dhinakaran were assigned the post of general secretary and deputy general secretary of the party respectively. Dhinakaran was also elected as national convener by his party members.

On 19 April, Dhinakaran was elected as the general secretary, while registering party in ECI and stated that Sasikala would be appointed as the party president after her release from jail. The Election Commission of India recognised the AMMK as a registered state party in December 2019, while the post of the party president remained vacant.

=== Elections and alliances ===
Before the 2019 general elections in Tamil Nadu, the AMMK entered into a political alliance with the Social Democratic Party of India (SDPI) in March 2019, allotting one seat to it. The AMMK was allocated the gift box symbol for the election. Both the parties failed to win from any of the seats, though the AMMK was able to spilt the votes the AIADMK would have usually received. During the rural local body elections held later in the same year, the AMMK had to contest on another symbol, this time of the coconut tree, and was able to secure victory from 94 panchayat union wards.

Ahead of the 2021 Tamil Nadu Legislative Assembly election, the Election Commission of India allotted the pressure cooker symbol to AMMK in December 2020. In Tamil Nadu, the AMMK entered into an alliance called the "People's Front" with Desiya Murpokku Dravida Kazhagam (DMDK), All India Majlis-e-Ittehadul Muslimeen (AIMIM), SDPI and other smaller parties for the election. Out of 234 seats, 60 seats were allocated to DMDK, six to SDPI and three to AIMIM. One seat each was allotted to Makkalarasu Katchi, Viduthalai Tamil Puligal Katchi, Gokula Makkal Katchi and Marudhu Senai Sangam. Candidates from these parties contested under AMMK. In Puducherry, it allied with SDPI and allotted it four seats.

Sasikala however announced her retirement from politics in March 2021, a month after being released from jail, and did not support the AMMK when it decided to contest against the AIADMK in the elections. While the AMMK and DMDK failed to win any seats in Tamil Nadu, the two cut into the vote share of AIADMK in 21 seats. The AIMIM and SDPI failed to win any seats as well and had a dismal performance.

The AMMK was again allotted the pressure cooker symbol for the 2022 Tamil Nadu urban local body elections. It won from three corporation wards, 33 municipal wards and 66 town panchayat wards. After his expulsion from the AIADMK in July 2022 and restoration in August amidst a power struggle with Edappadi K. Palaniswami, AIADMK leader O. Panneerselvam expressed the desire to unify the party along with Sasikala and Dhinakaran. Dhinakaran rejected the idea of merging the AMMK with AIADMK, but stated that his party was willing to ally with them.

On 9 May 2023, Pannerselvam, who had again been expelled from the AIADMK, met Dhinakaran and the two announced an alliance of their respective parties. Panruti Ramachandran, who was also expelled from AIADMK for siding with Pannerselvam, stated that they had decided on a "working arrangement" like that of the CPI and CPI (M). Dhinakaran was re-elected as the general secretary of the party on 6 August, while C. Gopal was elected as the president and S. Anbalagan was elected as the vice-president in party's general council meeting.

Dhinakaran anncounced on 11 March 2024 that his party was joining the National Democratic Alliance (NDA) led by the Bharatiya Janata Party (BJP) ahead of the 2024 Indian general election, assuring it of unconditional support. The BJP and AMMK came to an agreement on 20 March about the AMMK contesting from two seats in Tamil Nadu. It failed to win from any of the two seats, although Dhinakaran managed to become the runner-up in the elections to the Theni Lok Sabha constituency.

In May 2025, Dhinakaran stated that the AMMK and AIADMK will contest the 2026 Tamil Nadu Legislative Assembly election together as part of the NDA. Then, Dhinakaran announced on 3 September 2025 that his party's exit from NDA alliance. In January 2026, AMMK formed ally with long-time rival Edappadi K. Palaniswami-led AIADMK as part of NDA.

== Party flag ==
The flag is black at the top and red at the bottom with white in the middle with the smiling image of former Chief Minister of Tamil Nadu J. Jayalalithaa in the middle.

== Electoral performance ==
=== Indian general elections ===
Indian General Elections in Puducherry
Year	Election	Party Leader	Seats Won	Seats Contested	Vote (%)	Change of Seats	Result	Popular votes
2019	General election, 2019	T. T. V. Dhinakaran	0 / 1	1	0.49	Steady	Lost	4,791

Indian General Elections in Tamil Nadu
Year	Election	Party Leader	Seats Won	Seats Contested	Vote (%)	Change of Seats	Result	Popular votes
2019	General election, 2019	T. T. V. Dhinakaran	0 / 38	38	5.38	Steady	Lost	2,206,108
2024	General election, 2024	T. T. V. Dhinakaran	0 / 2	2	0.91	Steady	Lost	393,415

=== State legislative assembly elections ===
Tamil Nadu Legislative Assembly Elections
Year	Assembly	Party leader	Seats contested	Seats won	Change in seats	Percentage of votes	Vote swing	Popular vote	Outcome
2021	16th	T. T. V. Dhinakaran	165	0 / 234	Steady	2.35%	Steady	1,085,985	Lost
2026	17th	T. T. V. Dhinakaran	11	1 / 234	▲1	0.86%	▼1.49	425,345	Lost

Puducherry Legislative Assembly Elections
Year	Assembly	Party leader	Seats contested	Seats won	Change in seats	Percentage of votes	Vote swing	Popular vote	Outcome
2021	15th	T. T. V. Dhinakaran	25	0 / 30	Steady	0.55%	Steady	4,637	Lost

== List of party leaders ==
=== General secretaries ===
No.	Portrait	Name (Birth–Death)	Term in office		
No.	Portrait	Name (Birth–Death)	Assumed office	Left office	Time in office
1		T. T. V. Dhinakaran (b. 1963)	19 April 2019	Incumbent	7 years, 191 days

=== Presidents ===
No.	Portrait	Name (Birth–Death)	Term in office		
No.	Portrait	Name (Birth–Death)	Assumed office	Left office	Time in office
1		C. Gopal (b. 1946)	6 August 2023	2 April 2026	2 years, 239 days
2		C. Shanmugavelu (b. 1949)	24 October 2026	Incumbent	3 days

== See also ==
- List of political parties in India
