= Arani Lok Sabha constituency =

Parliamentary constituency in Tamil Nadu, India

Coordinates: 12.67°N 79.28°E

Arani
- Lok Sabha constituency
- Interactive map of Arani Loksabha constituency, post-2008 delimitation

Constituency details
- Country: India
- Region: South India
- State: Tamil Nadu
- Assembly constituencies: Polur; Arani; Cheyyar; Vandavasi; Gingee; Mailam
- Established: 2009
- Total electors: 14,45,781
- Reservation: None

Member of Parliament
- 18th Lok Sabha
- Incumbent M.S. Tharanivendhan
- Party: DMK
- Alliance: None
- Elected year: 2024

Arani is a Lok Sabha (Parliament of India) constituency in Tamil Nadu. Its Tamil Nadu Parliamentary Constituency number is 12 of 39. It was created during the 2008 assembly delimitation from the former Vandavasi constituency.

== Assembly segments ==
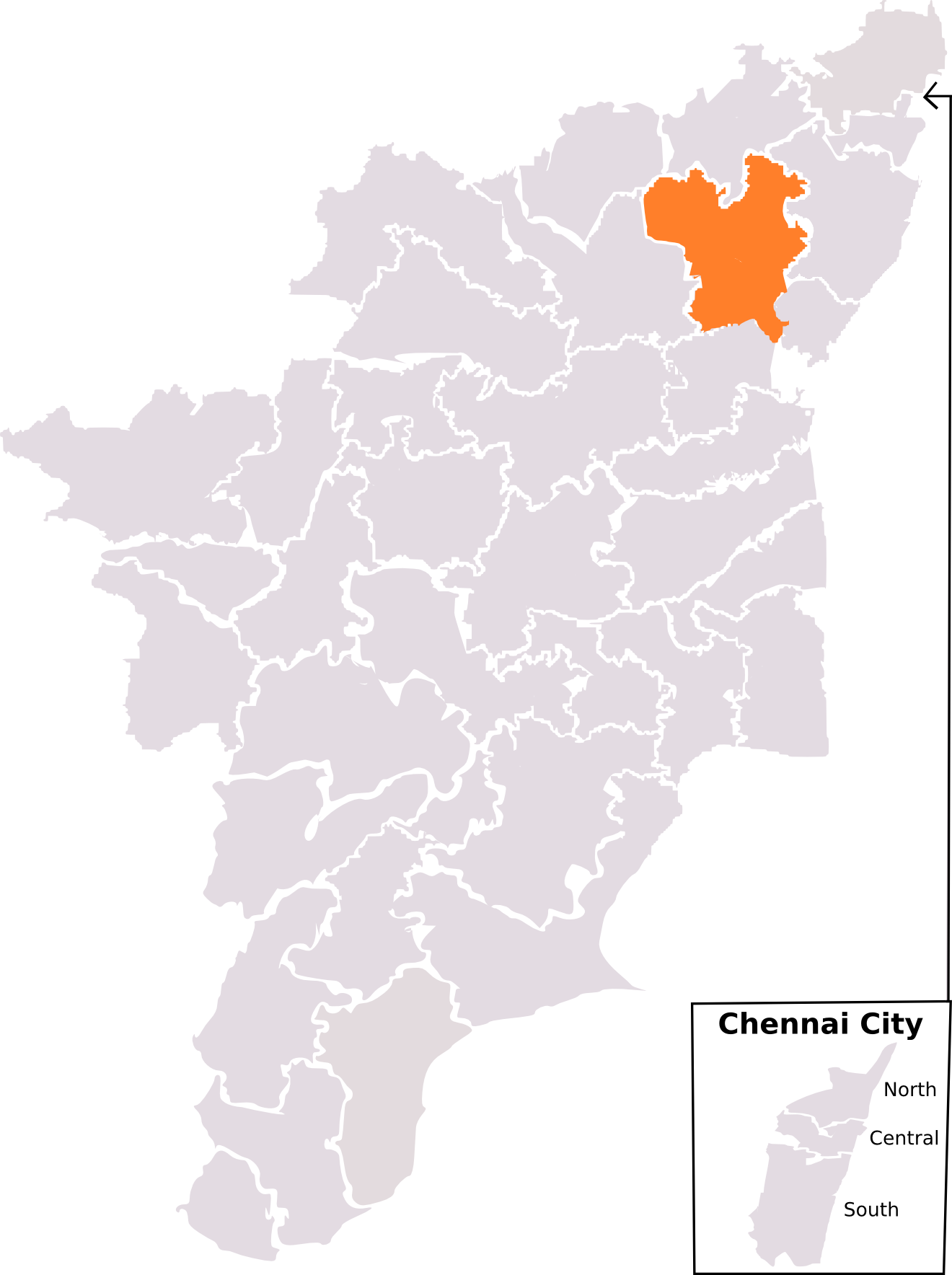
Arani constituency as laid out by 2008 Delimitation

Arani constituency is composed of the following assembly segments:

Constituency number	Name	Reserved for (SC/ST/None)	District	Party	2024 Lead
66	Polur	None	Tiruvannamalai	TVK	DMK
67	Arani	None	Tiruvannamalai	AIADMK	DMK
68	Cheyyar	None	Tiruvannamalai	AIADMK	DMK
69	Vandavasi	SC	Tiruvannamalai	DMK	DMK
70	Gingee	None	Viluppuram	PMK	DMK
71	Mailam	None	Viluppuram	AIADMK	DMK

== Members of the Parliament ==
Year	Winning candidate	Party
2009	M. Krishnasamy	Indian National Congress
2014	V. Elumalai	All India Anna Dravida Munnetra Kazhagam
2019	Dr. M. K. Vishnu Prasad	Indian National Congress
2024	M. S. Tharanivendhan	Dravida Munnetra Kazhagam

== Election results ==
Vote share of Winning candidates
2024	43.86%
2019	54.32%
2014	46.26%
2009	47.27%

=== General Elections 2024 ===
2024 Indian general election: Arani
Party	Candidate	Votes	%	±%
DMK	M. S. Tharanivendhan	500,099	43.86	▼10.46
AIADMK	G. V. Gajendran	2,91,333	25.55	▼8.48
PMK	A. Ganeshkumar	2,36,571	20.75	New
NOTA	None of the above	9,188	0.81	▼0.68
Margin of victory		2,08,766	18.31	▼1.99
Turnout		11,40,261	75.76	▼3.25
Registered electors		14,43,186		
DMK hold		Swing	▼10.46	

=== General Elections 2019 ===
2019 Indian general election: Arani
Party	Candidate	Votes	%	±%
INC	M. K. Vishnu Prasad	617,760	54.32	+51.77
AIADMK	V. Elumalai	3,86,954	34.03	−12.23
Independent	G. Senthamizhan	46,383	4.08	
NOTA	None of the above	16,921	1.49	0.63
MNM	V. Shaji	14,776	1.30	
Margin of victory		2,30,806	20.30	−2.14
Turnout		11,37,225	79.01	−0.87
Registered electors		14,49,150		+5.80
INC gain from AIADMK		Swing	+8.06	

=== General Elections 2014 ===
2014 Indian general election: Arani
Party	Candidate	Votes	%	±%
AIADMK	V. Elumalai	502,721	46.26%	11.72%
DMK	R. Sivanandam	2,58,877	23.82%	
PMK	A. K. Moorthy	2,53,332	23.31%	
INC	M. K. Vishnu Prasad	27,717	2.55%	−44.72%
Independent	K. Moorthy	10,263	0.94%	
NOTA	None of the above	9,304	0.86%	
Independent	V. Moorthy	8,059	0.74%	
BSP	A. Ganesan	5,573	0.51%	−0.64%
Margin of victory		2,43,844	22.44%	9.71%
Turnout		10,86,742	80.06%	2.90%
Registered electors		13,69,668		24.76%
AIADMK gain from INC		Swing	-1.01%	

=== General Elections 2009 ===
2009 Indian general election: Arani
Party	Candidate	Votes	%	±%
INC	M. Krishnasamy	396,728	47.27%	
AIADMK	Mukkur N. Subramanian	2,89,898	34.54%	
DMDK	Ra. Mohanam	1,05,729	12.60%	
Independent	M. Velaudham	14,919	1.78%	
BSP	A. Shankar	9,700	1.16%	
PNK	K. Saravanakumar	6,022	0.72%	
SP	T. V. Hariraj	5,178	0.62%	
Independent	G. Lokesh	4,934	0.59%	
Margin of victory		1,06,830	12.73%	
Turnout		8,39,297	76.62%	
Registered electors		10,97,865		
INC win (new seat)				
