= A. M. V. Prabhakara Raja =

Indian politician

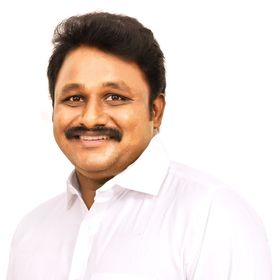

Member of the Tamil Nadu Legislative Assembly
- In office 7 May 2021 – 10 May 2026
- Preceded by: Virugai V. N. Ravi
- Constituency: Virugampakkam

Personal details
- Party: Dravida Munnetra Kazhagam
- Parent: A. M. Vikrama Raja (father)
- Education: University of Madras; SRM Institute of Science and Technology

A. M. Vikrama Prabhakara Raja is an Indian politician who is currently serving as the Member of Legislative Assembly of Tamil Nadu for Virugampakkam as a Dravida Munnetra Kazhagam candidate in 2021.

== Electoral performance ==
2021 Tamil Nadu Legislative Assembly election: Virugampakkam
Party	Candidate	Votes	%	±%
DMK	A. M. V. Prabhakara Raja	74,351	44.38%	+7.24
AIADMK	Virugai V. N. Ravi	55,984	33.42%	−5.09
MNM	Senegan	16,939	10.11%	New
NTK	T. S. Rajendran	10,185	6.08%	+4.37
Independent	M. Gunasekaran (A) Star M. Gunasekaran	5,186	3.10%	New
DMDK	B. Parthasarathy	1,585	0.95%	−4.73
NOTA	NOTA	1,563	0.93%	−1.34
Independent	R. Mayilsamy	1,440	0.86%	New
Margin of victory		18,367	10.96%	9.60%
Turnout		167,524	57.44%	−1.19%
Rejected ballots		187	0.11%	
Registered electors		291,642		
DMK gain from AIADMK		Swing	5.87%	
