= M. S. Tharanivendhan =

Indian politician

M. S.Tharanivendhan

Member of Parliament, Lok Sabha
- Incumbent
- Assumed office 4 June 2024
- Preceded by: M. K. Vishnu Prasad
- Constituency: Arani

Personal details
- Born: 15 June 1965 (age 61) Vellimedupettai Village, Tiruvannamalai district, Tamil Nadu
- Party: Dravida Munnetra Kazhagam
- Spouse: T. Meeradevi
- Children: 1 Son, 1 Daughter
- Parent(s): M. Suvaminadan, S. Saraswath Ammal
- Occupation: Politician

M. Suvaminadan Tharanivendhan is an Indian politician. He is a member of Dravida Munnetra Kazhagam party. He has been elected to Lok Sabha from Arani Lok Sabha constituency.
