= B. Parthasarathy =

Indian politician (born 1965)

Member of the Tamil Nadu Legislative Assembly
- In office 23 May 2011 – 21 May 2016
- Constituency: Virugambakkam

Personal details
- Born: 18 February 1965 (age 61) Chennai, Tamil Nadu
- Party: Desiya Murpokku Dravida Kazhagam
- Spouse: Karpagam
- Children: 1.Venkatesan and 2.Yuvaraj

B. Parthasarathy (born 18 February 1965) is an Indian politician and was a member of the 14th Tamil Nadu Legislative Assembly from the Virugambakkam Constituency in Chennai District. He represented the Desiya Murpokku Dravida Kazhagam party.

The elections of 2016 resulted in his constituency being won by Virugai V. N. Ravi.
