= Virugampakkam Assembly constituency =

State Legislative Assembly Constituency in Tamil Nadu

Coordinates: 13.049557°N 80.184928°E

Virugampakkam
- Constituency No. 22 for the Tamil Nadu Legislative Assembly

Constituency details
- Country: India
- Region: South India
- State: Tamil Nadu
- District: Chennai
- Lok Sabha constituency: Chennai South
- Established: 2008
- Total electors: 2,00,627

Member of Legislative Assembly
- 17th Tamil Nadu Legislative Assembly
- Incumbent Sabarinathan.R
- Party: TVK
- Alliance: TVK+
- Elected year: 2026

Virugampakkam is a legislative assembly constituency in the Indian state of Tamil Nadu. Its State Assembly Constituency number is 22. It comprises a part of Chennai and falls under Chennai South Lok Sabha constituency for national elections to the Parliament of India. The constituency was created following delimitation of constituencies in 2008. It is one of the 234 State Legislative Assembly Constituencies in Tamil Nadu.

== Members of Legislative Assembly ==
| Year | Winner | Party |
|---|---|---|
| 2011 | B. Parthasarathy | Desiya Murpokku Dravida Kazhagam |
| 2016 | Virugai V. N. Ravi | All India Anna Dravida Munnetra Kazhagam |
| 2021 | A. M. V. Prabhakara Raja | Dravida Munnetra Kazhagam |
| 2026 | R. Sabarinathan | Tamilaga Vettri Kazhagam |

== Overview ==
As per orders of the Delimitation Commission, No. 22 Virugampakkam Assembly constituency is composed of Wards 65 and 128-131 of Greater Chennai Corporation.

== Election results ==
Vote share of winning candidates
| 2026 | 44.03% |
| 2021 | 44.38% |
| 2016 | 38.51% |
| 2011 | 49.65% |

=== 2026 ===
2026 Tamil Nadu Legislative Assembly election: Virugampakkam
| Party | Candidate | Votes | % | ±% |
|---|---|---|---|---|
| TVK | Sabarinathan. R | 76,092 | 44.03 | New |
| DMK | Prabhakara Raja. A.M.V | 49,006 | 28.35 | ▼16.03 |
| AIADMK | Virugai V.N. Ravi | 38,767 | 22.43 | ▼10.99 |
| NTK | Santhosh | 6,056 | 3.50 | ▼2.58 |
| NOTA | NOTA | 1,030 | 0.60 | ▼0.33 |
| RPI(A) | Jagadish. S | 462 | 0.27 | New |
| TTNP | Sureshbabu. T.M | 155 | 0.09 | New |
| Independent | Sabarinathan. P | 124 | 0.07 | New |
| Independent | Dineshkumar. N | 122 | 0.07 | New |
| Independent | Ravikumar | 107 | 0.06 | New |
| TVK | Muthuraj. T | 101 | 0.06 | New |
| Independent | Srinivasan. M | 101 | 0.06 | New |
| Independent | Rangaraj. G | 91 | 0.05 | New |
| Independent | Chandra Sekar. K | 88 | 0.05 | New |
| Independent | Gopinath. G | 82 | 0.05 | New |
| Independent | Sankar. E | 66 | 0.04 | New |
| Independent | Kumar. S | 63 | 0.04 | New |
| Independent | Ezhilraj. D | 52 | 0.03 | New |
| Independent | Lukmanbabu. S | 50 | 0.03 | New |
| APTADMK | Roy George | 43 | 0.02 | New |
| Independent | Karthick. M | 41 | 0.02 | New |
| NIP | Balamurugan. P | 40 | 0.02 | New |
| Independent | Esakkimuthunadar. P | 36 | 0.02 | New |
| Independent | Alex Pandian. K | 36 | 0.02 | New |
| Independent | Venkatesan. C | 20 | 0.01 | New |
| Margin of victory | | 27,086 | 15.68 | ▲4.72 |
| Turnout | | 1,72,831 | 86.15 | ▲28.71 |
| Registered electors | | 2,00,627 | | ▼91,015 |
| TVK gain from DMK | | Swing | ▲44.03 | |

=== 2021 ===
2021 Tamil Nadu Legislative Assembly election: Virugampakkam
| Party | Candidate | Votes | % | ±% |
|---|---|---|---|---|
| DMK | A. M. V. Prabhakara Raja | 74,351 | 44.38% | +7.24 |
| AIADMK | Virugai V. N. Ravi | 55,984 | 33.42% | −5.09 |
| MNM | Senegan | 16,939 | 10.11% | New |
| NTK | T. S. Rajendran | 10,185 | 6.08% | +4.37 |
| Independent | M. Gunasekaran (A) Star M. Gunasekaran | 5,186 | 3.10% | New |
| DMDK | B. Parthasarathy | 1,585 | 0.95% | −4.73 |
| NOTA | NOTA | 1,563 | 0.93% | −1.34 |
| Independent | R. Mayilsamy | 1,440 | 0.86% | New |
| Margin of victory | | 18,367 | 10.96% | 9.60% |
| Turnout | | 167,524 | 57.44% | −1.19% |
| Rejected ballots | | 187 | 0.11% | |
| Registered electors | | 291,642 | | |
| DMK gain from AIADMK | | Swing | 5.87% | |

=== 2016 ===
2016 Tamil Nadu Legislative Assembly election: Virugampakkam
| Party | Candidate | Votes | % | ±% |
|---|---|---|---|---|
| AIADMK | Virugai V. N. Ravi | 65,979 | 38.51% | New |
| DMK | K. Thanasekaran | 63,646 | 37.15% | −2.72 |
| BJP | Tamilisai Soundararajan | 19,167 | 11.19% | +5.96 |
| DMDK | B. Parthasarathy | 9,730 | 5.68% | −43.97 |
| PMK | C. H. Jayarao | 3,945 | 2.30% | New |
| NOTA | NOTA | 3,897 | 2.27% | New |
| NTK | T. S. Rajendran | 2,926 | 1.71% | New |
| Margin of victory | | 2,333 | 1.36% | −8.42% |
| Turnout | | 171,339 | 58.63% | −8.41% |
| Registered electors | | 292,248 | | |
| AIADMK gain from DMDK | | Swing | -11.14% | |

=== 2011 ===
2011 Tamil Nadu Legislative Assembly election: Virugampakkam
| Party | Candidate | Votes | % | ±% |
|---|---|---|---|---|
| DMDK | B. Parthasarathy | 71,524 | 49.65% | New |
| DMK | K. Thanasekaran | 57,430 | 39.86% | New |
| BJP | P. Sritharan | 7,525 | 5.22% | New |
| Independent | S. Nagavel | 3,431 | 2.38% | New |
| Puratchi Bharatham | A. Baskar | 1,447 | 1.00% | New |
| BSP | V. Subramaniyam | 969 | 0.67% | New |
| Margin of victory | | 14,094 | 9.78% | |
| Turnout | | 144,069 | 67.04% | |
| Registered electors | | 214,898 | | |
| DMDK win (new seat) | | | | |
