= V. Elumalai =

Indian politician

V. Ezhumalai

Member of the India Parliament for Arani
- In office 1 September 2014 – 23 May 2019
- Constituency: Arani

Personal details
- Born: 3 May 1955 (age 71) Annamanglam, Villupuram, Tamil Nadu
- Party: All India Anna Dravida Munnetra Kazhagam
- Spouse: Smt. Rajarani
- Children: 2
- Education: Madras Law College
- Occupation: Advocate
- As of 17 December, 2016

V Ezhumalai (ta: வி.ஏழுமலை) is an Indian politician and Member of Parliament elected from Tamil Nadu. He is elected to the Lok Sabha from Arani constituency as an Anna Dravida Munnetra Kazhagam candidate in 2014 election.

He is the former party MLA of Gingee constituency and as of 2014 he is the district secretary of Villupuram District (North) MGR Mantram. He is a native of Annamangalam near Gingee. There is a rumor that he is dismissed from Party in 2021 Election
