= 2009 Indian general election in Tamil Nadu =

- 13 May 2009 (5A phase)

39 seats
- Turnout: 73.03%
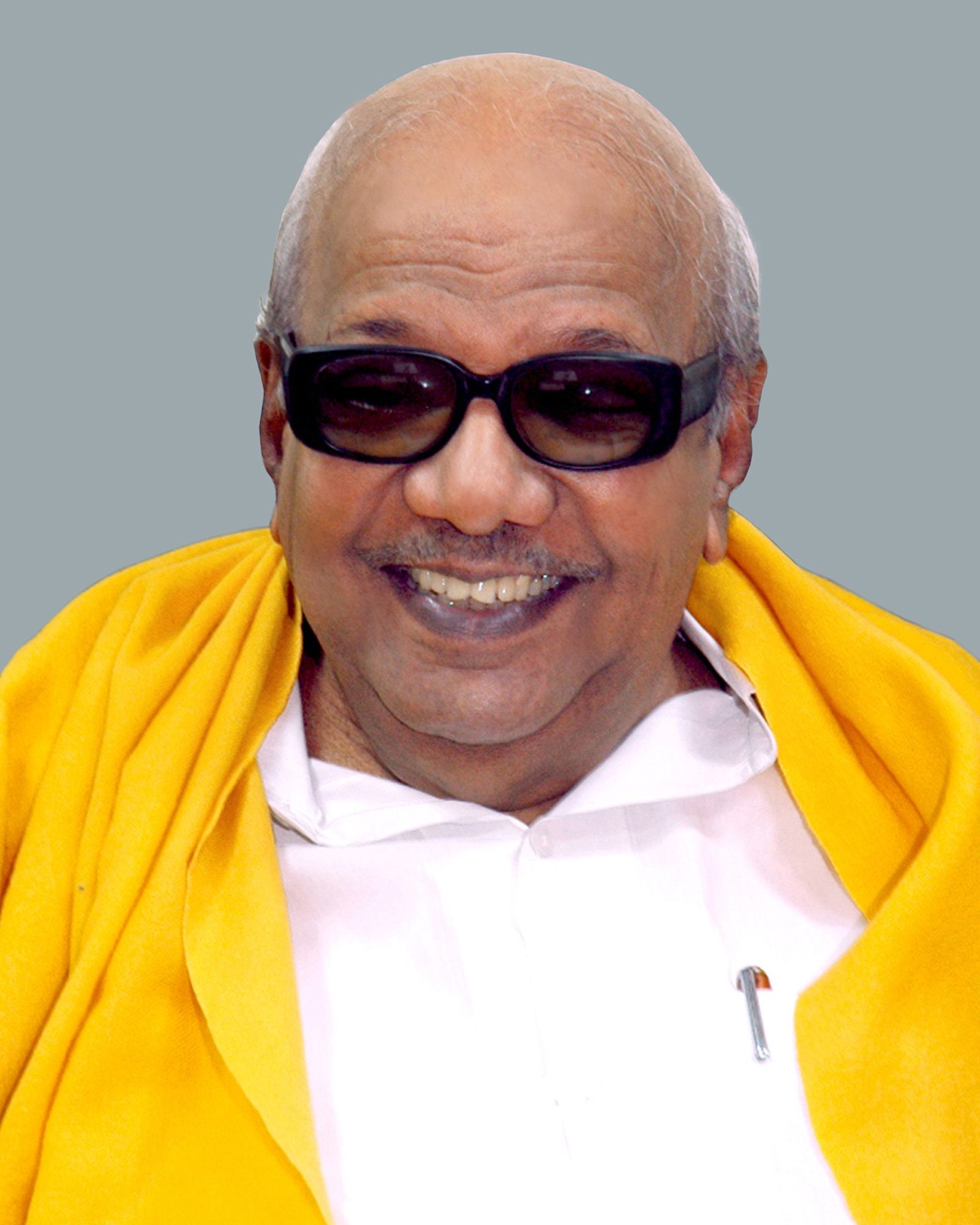

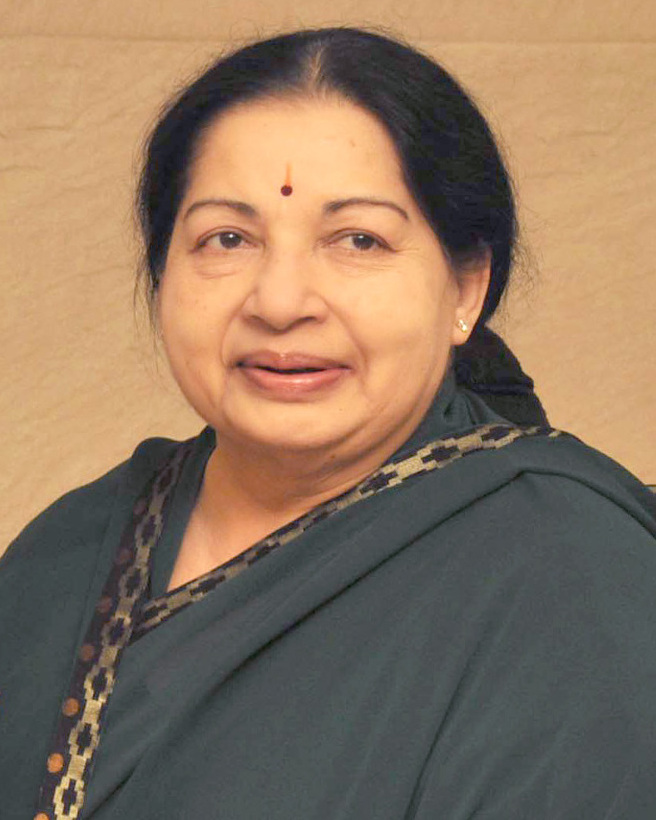

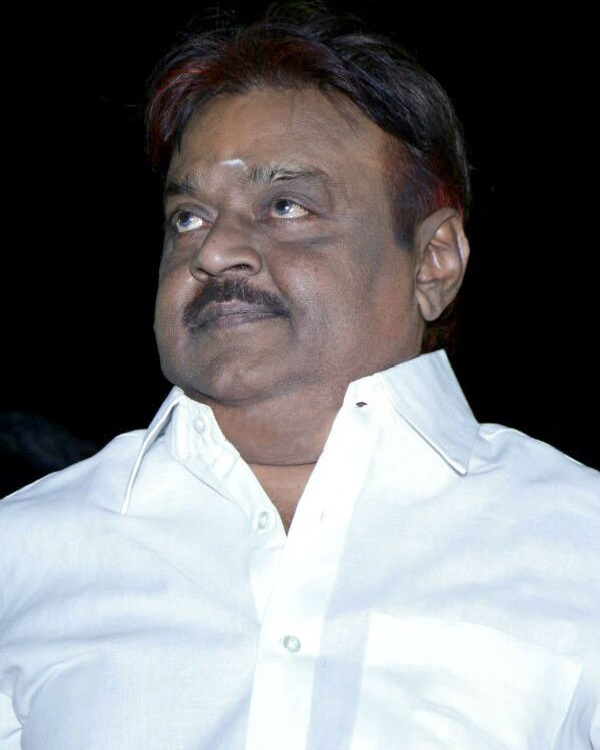
	First party	Second party	Third party
Leader	M. Karunanidhi	J. Jayalalithaa	A. Vijayakanth
Party	DMK	AIADMK	DMDK
Alliance	UPA	Third Front	None
Seats won	27	12	0
Seat change	▲1	▲12	New
Popular vote	12,926,009	11,336,586	3,126,117
Percentage	42.53%	37.30%	10.29%
Swing	▼14.86%	▲2.43%	New
Prime Minister before election
Manmohan Singh
INC
Prime Minister after election
Manmohan Singh
INC

The 2009 Indian general election polls in Tamil Nadu was held for 39 seats in the state. There was a radical change in the alliances in this election compared to the last election, reminiscent of the 1999 election in Tamil Nadu. In this election the Dravida Munnetra Kazhagam (DMK) decided to stay with the United Progressive Alliance (UPA), but the Pattali Makkal Katchi (PMK), Marumalarchi Dravida Munnetra Kazhagam (MDMK (breakaway)), and the left parties decided to ally itself with the All India Anna Dravida Munnetra Kazhagam (AIADMK) and the newly formed Third Front named United National Progressive Alliance.

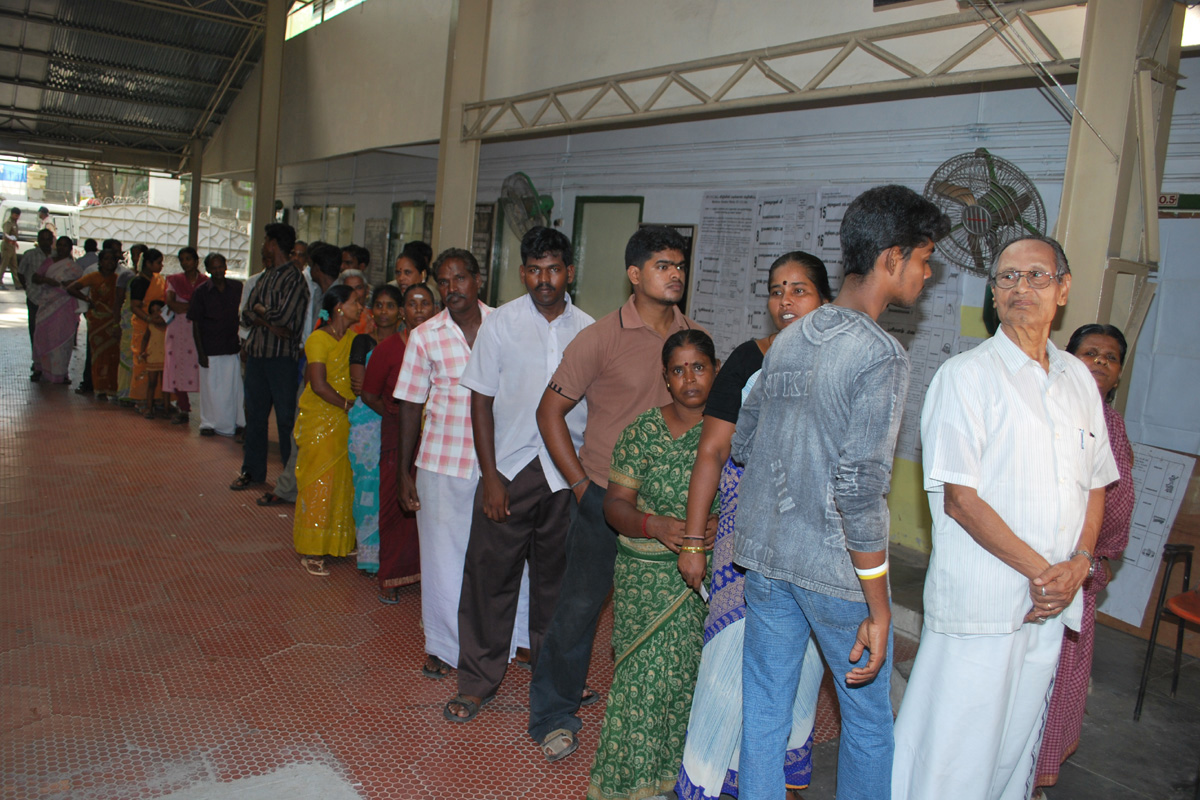
The voters standing in a queue for cast their votes at a polling booth in Chennai for 2009 Loksabha Election

After counting on 16 May 2009, the results to everyone surprise, showed the DMK and its allies, Indian National Congress and Viduthalai Chiruthaigal Katchi, winning in a landslide victory, securing 27 out of 39 seats. DMK and its allies were also able to hold on to Pondicherry, which has one seat. Many expected, before the election, through opinion polling and voters on the ground, that AIADMK, and its allies, who were formerly with the UPA (PMK, MDMK, Left Front) in 2004, would win in a landslide, but due to the late surge of support for the DMK, and the nationwide support of the UPA government, the DMK and its allies, ended up winning the most seats, and this victory, proved crucial, for Congress to form the government on its own, without the Left Front.

M.K. Azhagiri, son of DMK leader Karunanidhi, ran in the Madurai, and won his debut run in national politics. Out of the 24 incumbents from the 2004 Election, who ran again in this election, only 10 incumbents won, with 7 of the members from the DMK and 3 of the members from the Indian National Congress (INC).

Even though it was a big victory for DMK and allies, Congress fared poorly in the state compared to DMK, where cabinet minister Mani Shankar Aiyar, who has been in power in Mayiladuthurai constituency for 10 years, was defeated and P. Chidambaram, who has been in power in Sivaganga constituency, for past 25 years, lost according to the first counting, and won during the recount, barely winning his constituency.

Even though the opposition party failed to get more seats than the DMK and its allies, AIADMK, improved its tally to 9 seats, from winning no seats in 2004. But the opposition allies (PMK, MDMK and Left Parties), significantly lost seats compared to the 2004 election, when they allied with DMK. PMK especially lost all 6 of its seats that it got in the last Lok Sabha, coming out as the biggest loser of this election in Tamil Nadu.

== Schedule ==
Event	Date
Date for Nominations	17 April 2009
Last Date for filing Nominations	24 April 2009
Date for scrutiny of nominations	25 April 2009
Last date for withdrawal of candidatures	27 April 2009
Date of poll	13 May 2009
Date of counting	16 May 2009

== Seat allotments ==
=== United Progressive Alliance ===
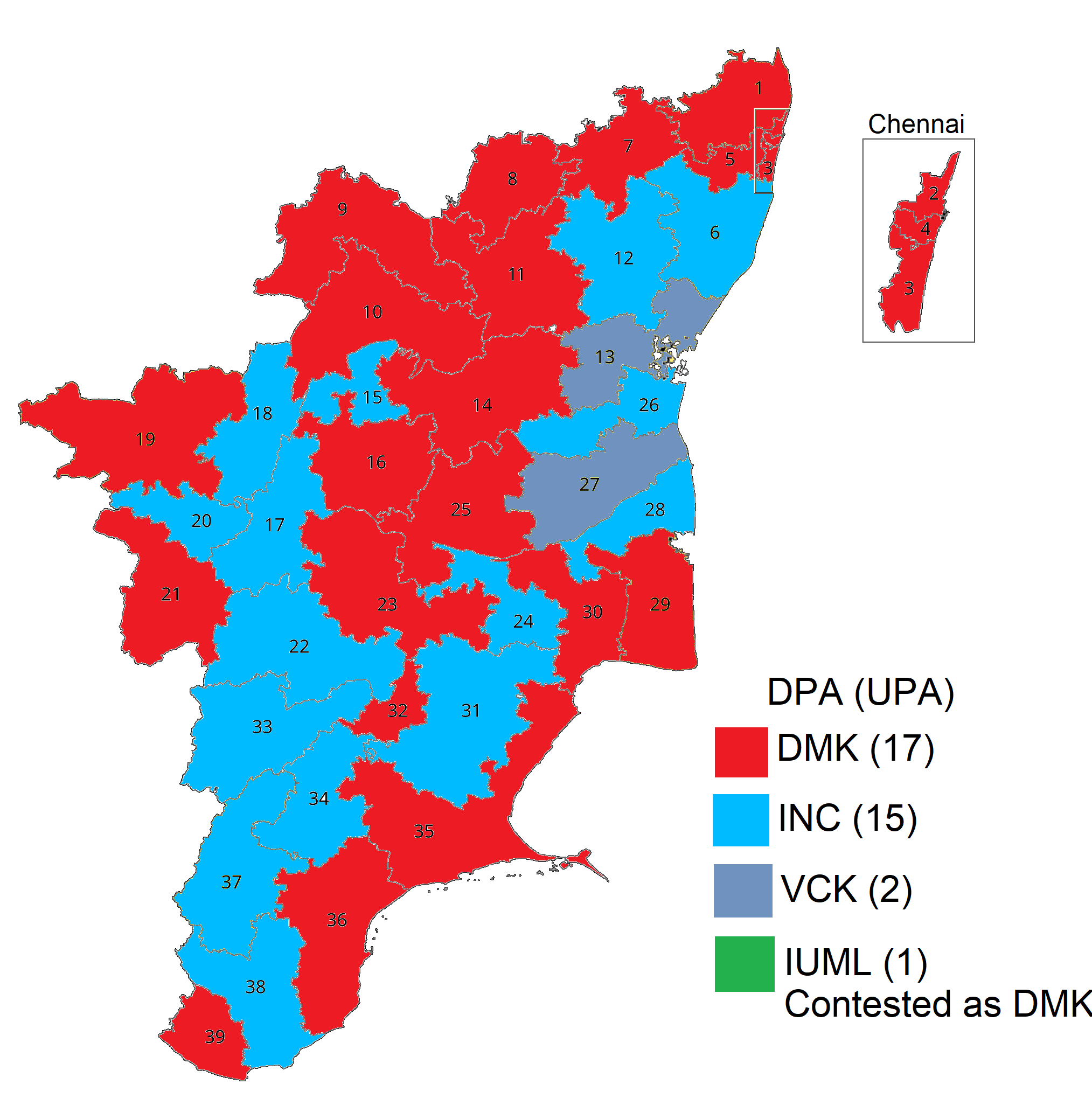
Election map of seat allotments based on parties contesting under the UPA

United Progressive Alliance
Party	Flag	Symbol	Leader	Seats Contested	
Dravida Munnetra Kazhagam			M. Karunanidhi	21	22
Indian Union Muslim League			K. M. Kader Mohideen	1	22
Indian National Congress			K. V. Thangabalu	15	
Viduthalai Chiruthaigal Katchi			Thol. Thirumavalavan	2	
Total				39	

=== Third Front ===
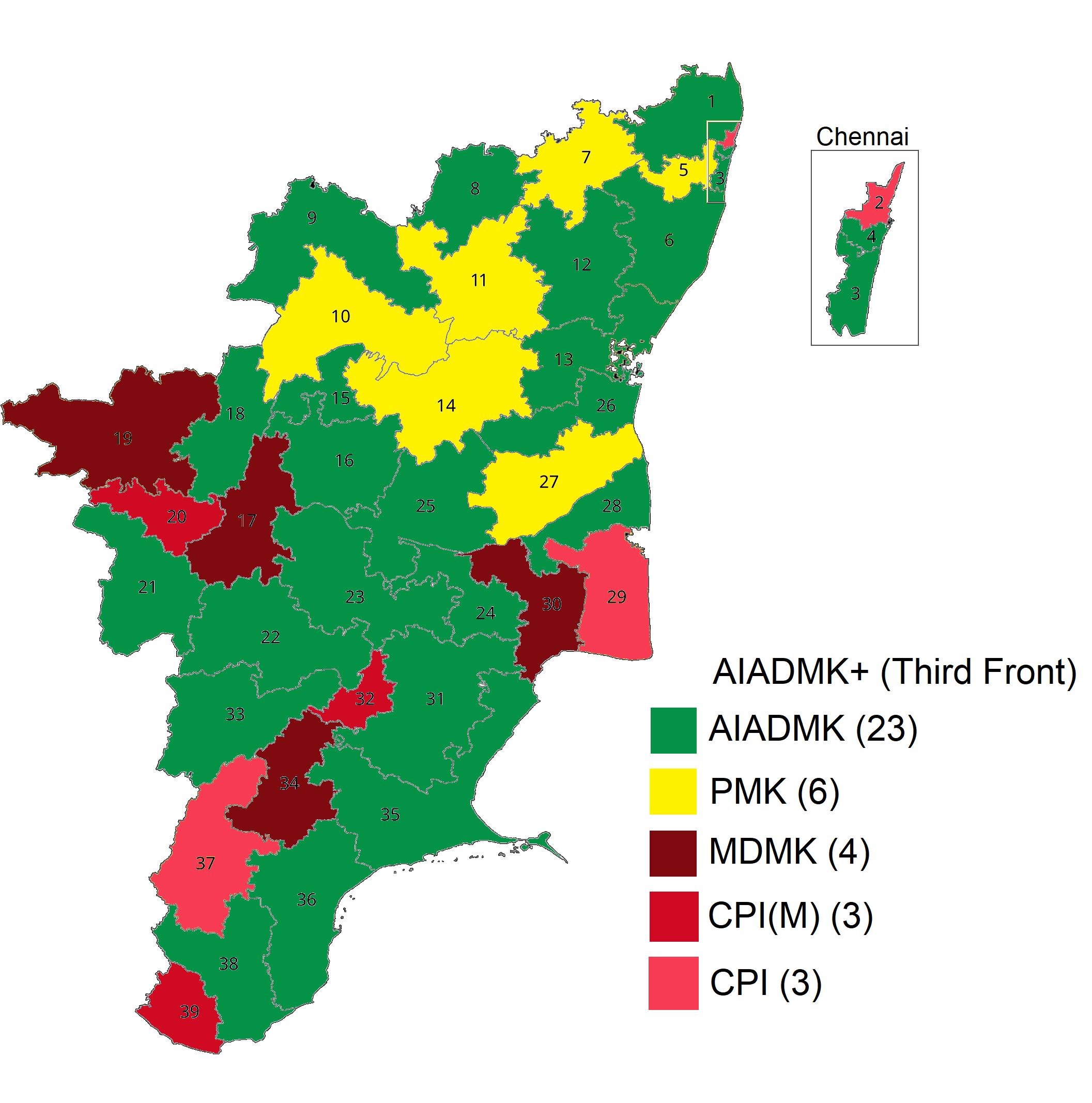
Election map of seat allotments based on parties contesting under the Third Front alliance.

Third Front
Party	Flag	Symbol	Leader	Seats Contested
All India Anna Dravida Munnetra Kazhagam			J. Jayalalithaa	23
Pattali Makkal Katchi			Dr. Ramdoss	6
Marumalarchi Dravida Munnetra Kazhagam			Vaiko	4
Communist Party of India (Marxist)			N. Varadarajan	3
Communist Party of India			Tha. Pandian	3
Total				39

=== National Democratic Alliance ===
National Democratic Alliance
Party	Flag	Symbol	Leader	Seats	
Bharatiya Janata Party			Pon. Radhakrishnan	12	19
All India Samathuva Makkal Katchi			R. Sarathkumar	5	19
Akhila Indhiya Naadalum Makkal Katchi			Karthik	2	19
Janata Dal			Nitish Kumar	2	
Total				21	

== Candidate List ==
=== List of Candidates from Prominent Alliances ===
- *Incumbent MPs

Constituency		UPA		Third Front	
#	Name	Party	Candidate	Party	Candidate
1	Thiruvallur (SC)	DMK	S. Gayathri	ADMK	P. Venugopal
2	Chennai North	DMK	T.K.S. Elangovan	CPI	D. Pandian
3	Chennai South	DMK	R. S. Bharathi	ADMK	C. Rajendran
4	Chennai Central	DMK	Dayanidhi Maran*	ADMK	S. M. K. Mogamed Ali Jinnah
5	Sriperumbudur	DMK	T.R. Baalu*	PMK	A. K. Moorthy*
6	Kancheepuram (SC)	INC	P. Viswanathan	ADMK	E. Ramakrishnan
7	Arakkonam	DMK	Jagathrakshakan	PMK	R. Velu*
8	Vellore	DMK	Abdul Rahman (Note: Indian Union Muslim League candidate contested on the "Rising Sun" symbol of the Dravida Munnetra Kazhagam (DMK), and is officially recorded as a DMK candidate in electoral records.)	ADMK	L. K. M. B. Vasu
9	Krishnagiri	DMK	E.G. Sugavanam*	ADMK	K. Nanjegowdu
10	Dharmapuri	DMK	R. Thamaraiselvan	PMK	R. Senthil*
11	Tiruvannamalai	DMK	D. Venugopal*	PMK	J. Gurunathan
12	Arani	INC	M. Krishnasamy	ADMK	N. Subramaniyan
13	Viluppuram (SC)	VCK	K. Swamidurai	ADMK	K. Murugesan Anandan
14	Kallakurichi	DMK	Adhi Sankar	PMK	K. Dhanaraju*
15	Salem	INC	K. V. Thangkabalu*	ADMK	S. Semmalai
16	Namakkal	DMK	S. Gandhiselvan	ADMK	V. Vairam Tamilarasi
17	Erode	INC	E. V. K. S. Elangovan*	MDMK	A. Ganeshamurthi
18	Tiruppur	INC	S. K. Kharventhan*	ADMK	C. Sivasamy
19	Nilgiris (SC)	DMK	A. Raja*	MDMK	Dr. C. Krishnan*
20	Coimbatore	INC	R. Prabhu*	CPI(M)	P. R. Natarajan
21	Pollachi	DMK	K. Shamugasundaram	ADMK	K. Sugumar
22	Dindigul	INC	N. S. V. Chitthan*	ADMK	P. Balasubramani
23	Karur	DMK	K. C. Palanisamy	ADMK	M. Thambidurai
24	Tiruchirappalli	INC	Sarubala R. Thondaiman	ADMK	P. Kumar
25	Perambalur	DMK	D. Napoleon	ADMK	K. K. Balasubramanian
26	Cuddalore	INC	K. S. Alagiri	ADMK	M. C. Sampath
27	Chidambaram (SC)	VCK	Thol. Thirumavalavan	PMK	E. Ponnuswamy*
28	Mayiladuthurai	INC	Mani Shankar Aiyar*	ADMK	O. S. Manian
29	Nagapattinam (SC)	DMK	A.K.S. Vijayan*	CPI	M. Selvarasu
30	Thanjavur	DMK	S.S. Palanimanickam*	MDMK	Durai Balakrishnan
31	Sivaganga	INC	P. Chidambaram*	ADMK	R. S. Raja Kannappan
32	Madurai	DMK	M.K. Azhagiri	CPI(M)	P. Mohan
33	Theni	INC	J. M. Aaroon Rashid	ADMK	Thanga Tamil Selvan
34	Virudhunagar	INC	Manickam Tagore	MDMK	Vaiko
35	Ramanathapuram	DMK	J. K. Rithish	ADMK	V. Sathyamoorthy
36	Thoothukkudi	DMK	S. R. Jeyadurai	ADMK	Dr. Cynthia Pandian
37	Tenkasi (SC)	INC	K. Vellaipandi	CPI	P. Lingam
38	Tirunelveli	INC	S. S. Ramasubbu	ADMK	K. Annamalai
39	Kanniyakumari	DMK	J. Helen Davidson	CPI(M)	A. V. Bellarmin

=== List of Candidates from Other parties ===
Constituency		DMDK		NDA	
#	Name	Party	Candidate	Party	Candidate
1	Thiruvallur (SC)	DMDK	R. Suresh	JD(U)	M. S. Sudharsan
2	Chennai North	DMDK	V. Yuvaraj	BJP	Tamilisai Soundararajan
3	Chennai South	DMDK	V. Gopinath	BJP	La. Ganesan
4	Chennai Central	DMDK	V. V. Ramakrishnan		
5	Sriperumbudur	DMDK	M. Arun Subramanian		
6	Kancheepuram (SC)	DMDK	T. Tamilvendan		
7	Arakkonam	DMDK	S. Sankar	JD(U)	K. Shanmugam
8	Vellore	DMDK	Shoukath Sherif	BJP	A. K. Rajendiran
9	Krishnagiri	DMDK	D. Anbarasan	BJP	G. Balakrishnan
10	Dharmapuri	DMDK	V. Elangovan		
11	Tiruvannamalai	DMDK	S. Manikandan		
12	Arani	DMDK	R. A. Mohanam		
13	Viluppuram (SC)	DMDK	P. M. Ganapathi		
14	Kallakurichi	DMDK	L. K. Sudhish		
15	Salem	DMDK	Alagaapuram R. Mohanraj		
16	Namakkal	DMDK	N. Maheswaran	BJP	K. Suresh Gandhi
17	Erode	DMDK	K. G. Muthuvenkateshwaran	BJP	N. P. Palanisamy
18	Tiruppur	DMDK	N. Dinesh Kumar	BJP	M. Sivakumar
19	Nilgiris (SC)	DMDK	S. Selvaraj	BJP	S. Gurumurthy
20	Coimbatore	DMDK	R. Pandian	BJP	G. K. S. Selvakumar
21	Pollachi	DMDK	K. P. Thangavel	BJP	V. S. Baba Ramesh
22	Dindigul	DMDK	P. Muthuvelraj		
23	Karur	DMDK	R. Ramanathan		
24	Tiruchirappalli	DMDK	A. M. G. Vijaykumar	BJP	Lalitha Kumaramangalam
25	Perambalur	DMDK	Durai Kamaraj		
26	Cuddalore	DMDK	M. C. Dhamotharan		
27	Chidambaram (SC)	DMDK	S. Sasikumar		
28	Mayiladuthurai	DMDK	K. Pandian	BJP	S. Karthikeyan
29	Nagapattinam (SC)	DMDK	M. Muthukumar		
30	Thanjavur	DMDK	Dr. P. Ramanathan		
31	Sivaganga	DMDK	Barwatha Regina Papa		
32	Madurai	DMDK	K. Kaviarasu		
33	Theni	DMDK	M. G. Santhanam	BJP	A. Parvathi
34	Virudhunagar	DMDK	K. Pandiarajan	BJP	M. Karthik
35	Ramanathapuram	DMDK	S. Singai Jinnah	BJP	Su. Thirunavukkarasar
36	Thoothukkudi	DMDK	M. S. Sunther	BJP	S. Saravanan
37	Tenkasi	DMDK	K. Inbaraj		
38	Tirunelveli	DMDK	S. Michael Rayappan	BJP	Karu Nagarajan
39	Kanniyakumari	DMDK	S. Austin	BJP	Pon Radhakrishnan

== Voting and results ==
=== Results by Pre-Poll Alliance ===
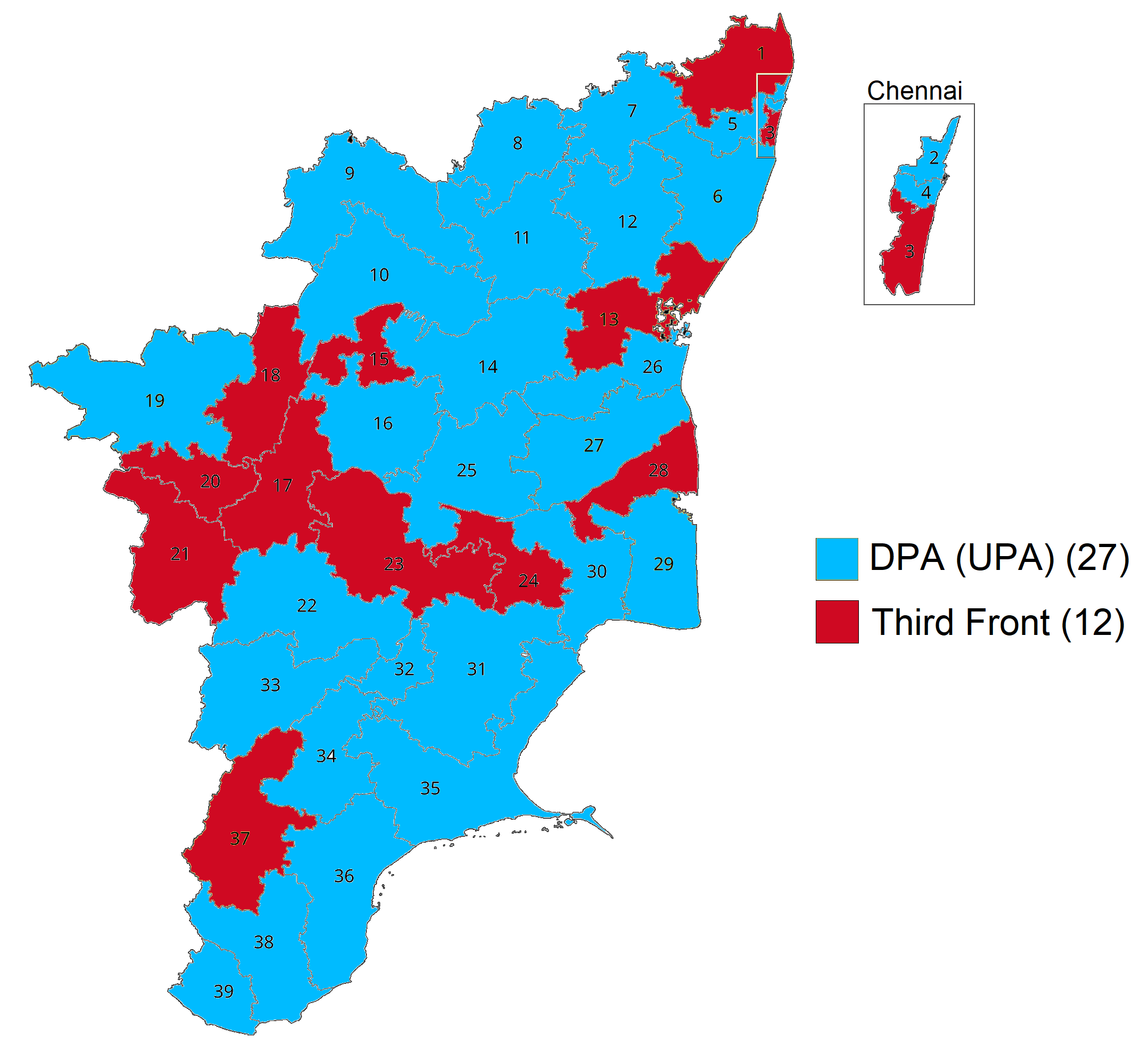
Election map of results based on alliances

Alliance	Party	Popular Vote	Percentage	Swing	Seats won	Seat Change
United Progressive Alliance	Dravida Munnetra Kazhagam	7,264,923	23.90%	▼0.70%	17	▲1
United Progressive Alliance	Indian National Congress	4,567,779	15.03%	▲0.63%	8	▼2
United Progressive Alliance	Viduthalai Chiruthaigal Katchi	732,833	2.41%	new party	1	new party
United Progressive Alliance	Indian Union Muslim League	360,474	1.19%		1	
United Progressive Alliance	Total	12,926,009	42.53%	▲3.53%	27	▲1
Third Front	All India Anna Dravida Munnetra Kazhagam	6,953,591	22.88%	▼6.89%	9	▲9
Third Front	Marumalarchi Dravida Munnetra Kazhagam	1,112,908	3.66%	▼2.29%	1	▼3
Third Front	Communist Party of India	865,029	2.85%	▼0.12%	1	▼1
Third Front	Communist Party of India (Marxist)	669,058	2.20%	▼0.67%	1	▼1
Third Front	Pattali Makkal Katchi	1,736,000	5.71%	▼1.00%	0	▼5
Third Front	Total	11,336,586	37.30%	▼10.97%	12	▼1
Desiya Murpokku Dravida Kazhagam		3,126,117	10.29%	new party	0	new party
Others		3,002,248	9.88%	▼2.85%	0	Steady
Valid Votes		30,390,960	99.96%			
Invalid Votes		12,787	0.04%			
Total Votes		30,403,747	100.00%			
Registered Voters/Turnout		41,620,460	73.05%	▲12.24%		

†: Seat change represents seats won in terms of the current alliances, which is considerably different from the last election.
‡: Vote % reflects the percentage of votes the party received compared to the entire electorate that voted in this election. Adjusted (Adj.) Vote %, reflects the % of votes the party received per constituency that they contested.
Sources: Election Commission of India

=== Result Analysis ===
Desiya Murpokku Dravida Kazhagam (DMDK) contested independently and secured 10.1% of the vote. Its presence was assessed to have influenced outcomes in several constituencies, favouring the DMK-led UPA alliance in 13 seats and the AIADMK-led Alliance in 11 seats. In all these lok sabha constituencies, the DMDK polled more votes than the respective victory margins.

== Strike Rate ==
Strike rate is determined by calculating the number of seats won by a party of the number of seats it contested.

Alliance/ Party		Seats contested	Seats Won	Strike Rate
UPA	DMK	22	18	81.81%
UPA	INC	15	8	53.33%
UPA	VCK	2	1	50.00%
UPA	Total	39	27	69.23%
Third Front	AIADMK	23	9	39.13%
Third Front	PMK	6	0	0.00%
Third Front	MDMK	4	1	25.00%
Third Front	CPI	3	1	33.33%
Third Front	CPI(M)	3	1	33.33%
Third Front	Total	39	12	30.76%

== List of elected MPs ==
Source: Election Commission of India 24 Incumbents (7 (DMK), 8 (INC), 5 (PMK), 1 (MDMK), 1 (CPM) from the 2004 Lok Sabha election ran in this election, either for the same constituency, or a different constituency. Since the UPA and the Left Front swept the last election, all of the incumbents were either from UPA or Left Front. 15 of them are now currently running for the UPA, while the other 7 candidates, from PMK, MDMK and CPM, are running for the Third Front.

Constituency		Winner				Runner Up				Margin	%
#	Name	Candidate	Party	Votes	%	Candidate	Party	Votes	%	Margin	%
1	Thiruvallur	P. Venugopal	ADMK	368,294	43.35	S. Gayathri	DMK	336,621	39.62	31,673	3.73
2	Chennai North	T. K. S. Elangovan	DMK	281,055	42.59	D. Pandian	CPI	261,902	39.69	19,153	2.90
3	Chennai South	C. Rajendran	ADMK	308,567	42.38	R. S. Bharathy	DMK	275,632	37.86	32,935	4.52
4	Chennai Central	Dayanidhi Maran	DMK	285,783	46.82	Md. Ali Jinnah	ADMK	252,329	41.34	33,454	5.48
5	Sriperumbudur	T. R. Baalu	DMK	352,641	44.41	A. K. Moorthy	PMK	327,605	41.26	25,036	3.15
6	Kancheepuram	P. Viswanathan	INC	330,237	41.97	E. Ramakrishnan	ADMK	317,134	40.30	13,103	1.67
7	Arakkonam	S. Jagathrakshakan	DMK	415,041	48.65	R. Velu	PMK	305,245	35.78	109,796	12.87
8	Vellore	Abdul Rahman	DMK	360,474	49.82	L. K. M. B. Vasu	ADMK	253,081	34.98	107,393	14.84
9	Krishnagiri	E. G. Sugavanam	DMK	335,977	44.64	K. Nanjegowdu	ADMK	259,379	34.47	76,598	10.17
10	Dharmapuri	R. Thamaraiselvan	DMK	365,812	47.01	R. Senthil	PMK	229,870	29.54	135,942	17.47
11	Tiruvannamalai	D. Venugopal	DMK	436,866	51.97	Kaduvetti Guru	PMK	288,566	34.33	148,300	17.64
12	Arani	M. Krishnasamy	INC	396,728	47.16	N. Subramaniyan	ADMK	289,898	34.46	106,830	12.70
13	Viluppuram	K. Anandan	ADMK	306,826	38.53	K. Swamidurai	VCK	304,029	38.17	2,797	0.36
14	Kallakurichi	Adhi Sankar	DMK	363,601	42.53	K. Dhanaraju	PMK	254,993	29.83	108,608	12.70
15	Salem	S. Semmalai	ADMK	380,460	42.48	K. V. Thangkabalu	INC	333,969	37.29	46,491	5.19
16	Namakkal	S. Gandhiselvan	DMK	371,476	43.95	V. Vairam Tamilarasi	ADMK	269,045	31.83	102,431	12.12
17	Erode	A. Ganeshamurthi	MDMK	284,148	37.05	E. V. K. S. Elangovan	INC	234,812	30.61	49,336	6.44
18	Tiruppur	C. Sivasami	ADMK	295,731	39.87	S. K. Kharventhan	INC	210,385	28.36	85,346	11.51
19	Nilgiris	A. Raja	DMK	316,802	44.64	C. Krishnan	MDMK	230,781	32.52	86,021	12.12
20	Coimbatore	P. R. Natarajan	CPI(M)	293,165	35.58	R. Prabhu	INC	254,501	30.88	38,664	4.70
21	Pollachi	K. Sugumar	ADMK	305,935	39.66	K. Shamugasundaram	DMK	259,910	33.69	46,025	5.97
22	Dindigul	N. S. V. Chitthan	INC	361,545	44.06	P. Baalasubramani	ADMK	307,198	37.44	54,347	6.62
23	Karur	M. Thambidurai	ADMK	380,542	46.14	K. C. Pallanishamy	DMK	333,288	40.41	47,254	5.73
24	Tiruchirappalli	P. Kumar	ADMK	298,710	41.59	Sarubala Thondaiman	INC	294,375	40.99	4,335	0.60
25	Perambalur	D. Napoleon	DMK	398,742	47.91	K. K. Balasubramanian	ADMK	321,138	38.59	77,604	9.32
26	Cuddalore	S. Alagiri	INC	320,473	42.76	M. C. Sampath	ADMK	296,941	39.62	23,532	3.14
27	Chidambaram	Thol. Thirumavalavan	VCK	428,804	49.30	E. Ponnuswamy	PMK	329,721	37.91	99,083	11.39
28	Mayiladuthurai	O. S. Manian	ADMK	364,089	45.54	Mani Shankar Aiyar	INC	327,235	40.93	36,854	4.61
29	Nagapattinam	A. K. S. Vijayan	DMK	369,915	48.48	M. Selvarasu	CPI	321,953	42.20	47,962	6.28
30	Thanjavur	S. S. Palanimanickam	DMK	408,343	50.55	Durai Balakrishnan	MDMK	306,556	37.95	101,787	12.60
31	Sivaganga	P. Chidambaram	INC	334,348	43.13	Raja Kannappan	ADMK	330,994	42.69	3,354	0.44
32	Madurai	M. K. Alagiri	DMK	431,295	54.48	P. Mohan	CPI(M)	290,310	36.67	140,985	17.81
33	Theni	J. M. Aaroon Rashid	INC	340,575	42.54	Thanga Tamil Selvan	ADMK	334,273	41.76	6,302	0.78
34	Virudhunagar	Manickam Tagore	INC	307,187	40.02	Vaiko	MDMK	291,423	37.96	15,764	2.06
35	Ramanathapuram	J. K. Rithesh	DMK	294,945	37.92	V. Sathiamoorthy	ADMK	225,030	28.93	69,915	8.99
36	Thoothukkudi	S. R. Jeyadurai	DMK	311,017	47.40	Dr. Cynthia Pandian	ADMK	234,368	35.72	76,649	11.68
37	Tenkasi	P. Lingam	CPI	281,174	37.69	G. Vellaipandi	INC	246,497	33.04	34,677	4.65
38	Tirunelveli	S. S. Ramasubbu	INC	274,932	39.23	K. Annamalai	ADMK	253,629	36.19	21,303	3.04
39	Kanniyakumari	J. Helen Davidson	DMK	320,161	41.81	Pon Radhakrishnan	BJP	254,474	33.24	65,687	8.57

== Post-election Union Council of Ministers from Tamil Nadu ==
=== Cabinet Ministers ===
Minister	Party	Lok Sabha Constituency/Rajya Sabha	Portfolios
P. Chidambaram	INC	Sivaganga	Ministry of Home
Dayanidhi Maran^{[2]}	DMK	Chennai Central	Minister of Textiles
A. Raja^{[1]}	DMK	Nilgiris (SC)	Minister of Communications and Information Technology
M. K. Azhagiri^{[3]}	DMK	Madurai	Minister of Chemicals and Fertilizers

=== Ministers of State ===
Minister	Party	Lok Sabha Constituency/Rajya Sabha	Portfolios
S. S. Palanimanickam^{[3]}	DMK	Thanjavur	Ministry of Finance
D. Napoleon^{[3]}	DMK	Perambalur	Ministry of Social Justice and Empowerment
S. Jagathrakshakan^{[3]}	DMK	Arakkonam	Ministry of Information and Broadcasting
S. Gandhiselvan^{[3]}	DMK	Namakkal	Minister of state for Health and Family Welfare

[1] – Due to his involvement with the 2G spectrum allocation case, A. Raja resigned as cabinet minister and MP on 14 November 2010. (See Spectrum Scandal)
[2] – Resigned on 7 July 2011 due to the CBI investigation on his involvement as Telecom minister in 2006.
[3] – Resigned on 20 March 2013 as party withdraw from the government.

== Assembly Segment wise lead ==
Party	Assembly segments	Position in Assembly (as of 2006 election)
Dravida Munnetra Kazhagam	100	96
All India Anna Dravida Munnetra Kazhagam	52	61
Indian National Congress	48	34
Marumalarchi Dravida Munnetra Kazhagam	10	6
Viduthalai Chiruthaigal Katchi	9	2
Communist Party of India	8	6
Communist Party of India (Marxist)	4	9
Pattali Makkal Katchi	1	18
Bharatiya Janata Party	2	0
Others	0	2
Total	234	

== Assembly Seat wise leads ==
- Not Including postal votes.

Constituency		Winner		Runner-up		Margin
#	Name	Party	Votes	Party	Votes	Margin
Thiruvallur Lok Sabha constituency
1	Gummidipoondi	AIADMK	64,736	DMK	58,508	6,228
2	Ponneri (SC)	AIADMK	60,976	DMK	47,743	13,233
4	Thiruvallur	DMK	56,942	AIADMK	56,619	323
5	Poonamallee (SC)	AIADMK	62,997	DMK	57,081	5,916
6	Avadi	AIADMK	60,534	DMK	59,914	620
9	Madavaram	AIADMK	66,547	DMK	58,675	7,872
Chennai North Lok Sabha constituency
10	Thiruvottiyur	CPI	53,684	DMK	50,732	2,952
11	R. K. Nagar	CPI	50,936	DMK	41,131	9,805
12	Perambur	DMK	51,335	CPI	50,845	490
13	Kolathur	DMK	51,723	CPI	33,343	18,380
15	Thiru. Vi. Ka. Nagar (SC)	DMK	45,700	CPI	37,922	7,778
17	Royapuram	DMK	40,375	CPI	35,163	5,212
Chennai South Lok Sabha constituency
22	Virugampakkam	AIADMK	47,502	DMK	37,342	10,160
23	Saidapet	DMK	51,889	AIADMK	50,800	1,089
24	Thiyagarayanagar	AIADMK	43,561	DMK	37,614	5,947
25	Mylapore	AIADMK	46,953	DMK	44,692	2,261
26	Velachery	AIADMK	48,513	DMK	43,624	4,889
27	Shozhinganallur	AIADMK	71,236	DMK	60,455	10,781
Chennai Central Lok Sabha constituency
14	Villivakkam	DMK	47,733	AIADMK	40,220	7,513
16	Egmore	DMK	46,527	AIADMK	39,966	6,561
18	Harbour	DMK	33,558	AIADMK	30,547	3,011
19	Chepauk-Thiruvallikeni	DMK	51,471	AIADMK	41,543	9,928
20	Thousand Lights	DMK	53,262	AIADMK	45,273	7,989
21	Anna Nagar	AIADMK	54,770	DMK	53,165	1,605
Sriperumbudur Lok Sabha constituency
7	Maduravoyal	PMK	60,572	DMK	56,172	4,400
8	Ambattur	DMK	59,848	PMK	58,311	1,537
28	Alandur	DMK	56,882	PMK	49,392	7,490
29	Sriperumbudur	DMK	56,947	PMK	51,775	5,172
30	Pallavaram	DMK	65,803	PMK	59,884	5,919
31	Tambaram	DMK	56,585	PMK	47,628	8,957
Kancheepuram Lok Sabha constituency
32	Chengalpattu	INC	52,317	AIADMK	52,183	134
33	Thiruporur	AIADMK	56,733	INC	42,835	13,898
34	Cheyyur (SC)	INC	50,333	AIADMK	44,769	5,564
35	Madhuranthakam (SC)	INC	52,460	AIADMK	49,465	2,995
36	Uthiramerur	INC	63,388	AIADMK	51,596	11,792
37	Kancheepuram	INC	68,493	AIADMK	62,349	6,144
Arakkonam Lok Sabha constituency
3	Tiruttani	DMK	85,719	PMK	52,279	33,440
38	Arakkonam (SC)	DMK	55,325	PMK	44,690	10,635
39	Sholinghur	DMK	75,295	PMK	56,738	18,557
40	Katpadi	DMK	64,368	PMK	45,583	18,785
41	Ranipet	DMK	60,339	PMK	52,148	8,191
42	Arcot	DMK	73,617	PMK	54,608	19,009
Vellore Lok Sabha constituency
43	Vellore	DMK	56,079	AIADMK	44,322	11,757
44	Anaikattu	DMK	61,073	AIADMK	39,849	21,224
45	K. V. Kuppam (SC)	DMK	58,771	AIADMK	40,943	17,828
46	Gudiyattam	DMK	66,530	AIADMK	50,075	16,455
47	Vaniyambadi	DMK	62,376	AIADMK	39,703	22,673
48	Ambur	DMK	55,405	AIADMK	38,172	17,233
Krishnagiri Lok Sabha constituency
51	Uthangarai (SC)	DMK	49,992	AIADMK	41,764	8,228
52	Bargur	DMK	53,572	AIADMK	48,209	5,363
53	Krishnagiri	DMK	51,414	AIADMK	42,309	9,105
54	Veppanahalli	DMK	61,120	AIADMK	42,230	18,890
55	Hosur	DMK	65,305	AIADMK	43,872	21,433
56	Thalli	DMK	54,564	AIADMK	40,995	13,569
Dharmapuri Lok Sabha constituency
57	Palacode	DMK	61,464	PMK	36,351	25,113
58	Pennagaram	DMK	54,803	PMK	32,753	22,050
59	Dharmapuri	DMK	63,088	PMK	37,749	25,339
60	Pappireddipatti	DMK	65,630	PMK	44,809	20,821
61	Harur (SC)	DMK	59,193	PMK	34,177	25,016
85	Mettur	DMK	61,167	PMK	43,937	17,230
Tiruvannamalai Lok Sabha constituency
49	Jolarpet	DMK	66,942	PMK	49,428	17,514
50	Tirupattur	DMK	65,766	PMK	41,373	24,393
62	Chengam	DMK	77,735	PMK	53,740	23,995
63	Tiruvannamalai	DMK	78,389	PMK	44,882	33,507
64	Kilpennathur	DMK	78,037	PMK	52,102	25,935
65	Kalasapakkam	DMK	68,289	PMK	46,720	21,569
Arani Lok Sabha constituency
66	Polur	INC	69,947	AIADMK	45,882	24,065
67	Arani	INC	71,789	AIADMK	55,823	15,966
68	Cheyyar	INC	75,279	AIADMK	47,254	28,025
69	Vandavasi	INC	64,238	AIADMK	41,788	22,450
70	Gingee	INC	60,949	AIADMK	50,982	9,967
71	Mailam	INC	52,931	AIADMK	47,930	5,001
Viluppuram Lok Sabha constituency (SC)
72	Tindivanam (SC)	AIADMK	49,201	VCK	46,284	2,917
73	Vanur (SC)	VCK	55,387	AIADMK	52,240	3,147
74	Viluppuram	AIADMK	56,793	VCK	50,285	6,508
75	Vikravandi	AIADMK	51,162	VCK	46,101	5,061
76	Tirukkoyilur	VCK	45,906	AIADMK	43,723	2,183
77	Ulundurpet	VCK	59,443	AIADMK	53,615	5,828
Kallakurichi Lok Sabha constituency
78	Rishivandiyam	DMK	59,242	PMK	36,750	22,492
79	Sankarapuram	DMK	61,618	PMK	42,998	18,620
80	Kallakurichi (SC)	DMK	62,995	PMK	46,572	16,423
81	Gangavalli (SC)	DMK	53,284	PMK	35,817	17,467
82	Attur (SC)	DMK	59,709	PMK	41,940	17,769
83	Yercaud (ST)	DMK	63,928	PMK	50,489	13,439
Salem Lok Sabha constituency
84	Omalur	AIADMK	57,720	INC	51,008	6,712
86	Edappadi	AIADMK	65,040	INC	56,818	8,222
88	Salem West	AIADMK	59,526	INC	53,107	6,419
89	Salem North	INC	58,438	AIADMK	58,300	138
90	Salem South	AIADMK	71,785	INC	51,861	19,924
91	Veerapandi	AIADMK	67,991	INC	62,226	5,765
Namakkal Lok Sabha constituency
87	Sankagiri	DMK	58,277	AIADMK	56,543	1,734
92	Rasipuram (SC)	DMK	64,620	AIADMK	50,105	14,515
93	Senthamangalam	DMK	67,641	AIADMK	42,969	24,672
94	Namakkal	DMK	62,989	AIADMK	38,779	24,210
95	Paramathi Velur	DMK	59,613	AIADMK	41,123	18,490
96	Tiruchengode	DMK	57,244	AIADMK	39,479	17,765
Erode Lok Sabha constituency
97	Kumarapalayam	MDMK	52,969	INC	35,945	17,024
98	Erode East	MDMK	40,961	INC	37,049	3,912
99	Erode West	MDMK	41,712	INC	35,215	6,497
100	Modakkurichi	MDMK	50,874	INC	38,379	12,495
101	Dharapuram (SC)	INC	47,377	MDMK	45,978	1,399
102	Kangayam	MDMK	51,521	INC	39,645	11,876
Tiruppur Lok Sabha constituency
103	Perundurai	AIADMK	46,934	INC	31,362	15,572
104	Bhavani	AIADMK	56,838	INC	36,500	20,338
105	Anthiyur	AIADMK	45,009	INC	37,444	7,565
106	Gobichettipalayam	INC	52,113	AIADMK	50,825	1,288
113	Tiruppur North	AIADMK	58,434	INC	27,930	30,504
114	Tiruppur South	AIADMK	37,621	INC	24,346	13,275
Nilgiris Lok Sabha constituency
107	Bhavanisagar	DMK	59,780	MDMK	42,293	17,487
108	Udagamandalam	DMK	50,646	MDMK	33,833	16,813
109	Gudalur	DMK	59,097	MDMK	21,505	37,592
110	Coonoor	DMK	53,875	MDMK	33,349	20,526
111	Mettuppalyam	MDMK	56,686	DMK	55,219	1,467
112	Avanashi	MDMK	43,090	DMK	37,686	5,404
Coimbatore Lok Sabha constituency
115	Palladam	CPI(M)	49,346	KNMK	36,558	12,788
116	Sulur	CPI(M)	42,593	KNMK	39,011	3,582
117	Kavundampalayam	CPI(M)	65,258	INC	49,251	16,007
118	Coimbatore North	CPI(M)	45,279	INC	38,913	6,366
120	Coimbatore South	INC	46,812	CPI(M)	42,604	4,208
121	Singanallur	INC	49,592	CPI(M)	47,920	1,672
Pollachi Lok Sabha constituency
119	Thondamuthur	AIADMK	55,655	DMK	41,015	14,640
122	Kinathukadavu	AIADMK	56,981	DMK	48,810	8,171
123	Pollachi	AIADMK	48,222	DMK	34,554	13,668
124	Valparai	DMK	45,385	AIADMK	40,922	4,463
125	Udumalaipet	AIADMK	54,146	DMK	44,349	9,797
126	Madathukulam	AIADMK	49,900	DMK	43,934	5,966
Dindigul Lok Sabha constituency
127	Palani	INC	57,074	AIADMK	54,576	2,498
128	Oddanchatram	INC	60,999	AIADMK	60,763	236
129	Athoor	INC	81,550	AIADMK	47,612	33,938
130	Nilakottai	INC	58,550	AIADMK	43,779	14,771
131	Natham	INC	58,083	AIADMK	47,672	10,411
132	Dindigul	AIADMK	52,655	INC	44,788	7,867
Karur Lok Sabha constituency
133	Vedasandur	AIADMK	70,324	DMK	61,898	8,426
134	Aravakurichi	AIADMK	55,224	DMK	49,085	6,139
135	Karur	AIADMK	71,557	DMK	52,172	19,385
136	Krishnarayapuram (SC)	AIADMK	59,022	DMK	54,990	4,032
138	Manapparai	AIADMK	70,848	DMK	67,273	3,575
179	Viralimalai	AIADMK	53,486	DMK	46,594	6,892
Tiruchirappalli Lok Sabha constituency
139	Srirangam	AIADMK	70,949	INC	50,767	20,182
140	Trichy West	INC	51,340	AIADMK	48,954	2,386
141	Trichy East	INC	50,890	AIADMK	50,698	192
142	Thiruverumbur	INC	56,312	AIADMK	49,657	6,655
178	Gandharvakottai	INC	41,977	AIADMK	41,236	741
180	Pudukkottai	INC	42,228	AIADMK	37,095	5,133
Perambalur Lok Sabha constituency
137	Kulithalai	DMK	63,225	AIADMK	56,566	6,659
143	Lalgudi	DMK	66,646	AIADMK	49,330	17,316
144	Manachanallur	DMK	61,136	AIADMK	59,159	1,977
145	Musiri	DMK	65,773	AIADMK	52,934	12,839
146	Thuraiyur (SC)	DMK	64,059	AIADMK	47,807	16,252
147	Perambalur (SC)	DMK	75,370	AIADMK	55,107	20,263
Cuddalore Lok Sabha constituency
151	Tittagudi (SC)	INC	52,372	AIADMK	45,643	6,729
152	Vridhachalam	INC	57,277	AIADMK	53,875	3,402
153	Neyveli	INC	46,301	AIADMK	43,260	3,041
154	Panruti	INC	57,500	AIADMK	50,320	7,180
155	Cuddalore	AIADMK	51,371	INC	49,018	2,353
156	Kurinjipadi	INC	57,413	AIADMK	52,276	5,137
Chidambaram Lok Sabha constituency (SC)
148	Kunnam	VCK	71,187	PMK	56,872	14,315
149	Ariyalur	VCK	78,226	PMK	57,097	21,129
150	Jayankondam	VCK	68,568	PMK	68,564	4
157	Bhuvanagiri	VCK	74,389	PMK	59,529	14,860
158	Chidambaram	VCK	59,550	PMK	46,357	13,193
159	Kattumannarkovil (SC)	VCK	76,059	PMK	41,044	35,015
Mayiladuthurai Lok Sabha constituency
160	Sirkazhi (SC)	AIADMK	64,240	INC	47,250	12,997
161	Mayiladuthurai	AIADMK	57,709	INC	47,336	10,373
162	Poompuhar	AIADMK	68,327	INC	57,500	10,827
170	Thiruvidaimarudur (SC)	AIADMK	59,553	INC	59,540	13
171	Kumbakonam	INC	58,528	AIADMK	56,148	2,380
172	Papanasam	AIADMK	57,982	INC	56,192	1,790
Nagapattinam Lok Sabha constituency (SC)
163	Nagapattinam	DMK	48,850	CPI	42,926	5,924
164	Kilvelur	CPI	50,314	DMK	48,480	1,834
165	Vedharanyam	DMK	59,027	CPI	47,839	11,188
166	Thiruthuraipoondi	CPI	66,778	DMK	56,006	12,772
168	Thiruvarur	DMK	75,038	CPI	55,873	19,165
169	Nannilam	DMK	81,112	CPI	58,038	23,074
Thanjavur Lok Sabha constituency
167	Mannargudi	DMK	71,562	MDMK	56,554	15,008
173	Thiruvaiyaru	DMK	77,426	MDMK	60,610	16,816
174	Thanjavur	DMK	59,128	MDMK	43,535	15,593
175	Orathanadu	DMK	64,386	MDMK	61,340	3,046
176	Pattukkottai	DMK	67,005	MDMK	43,840	23,165
177	Peravurani	DMK	68,055	MDMK	40,559	27,496
Sivagangai Lok Sabha constituency
181	Thirumayam	INC	50,087	AIADMK	44,769	5,312
182	Alangudi	INC	55,817	AIADMK	46,927	8,890
184	Karaikudi	INC	58,076	AIADMK	54,391	3,685
185	Thiruppathur	AIADMK	62,273	INC	55,606	6,667
186	Sivagangai	AIADMK	60,464	INC	57,564	2,900
187	Manamadurai (SC)	AIADMK	62,020	INC	56,545	5,475
Madurai Lok Sabha constituency
188	Melur	DMK	83,046	CPI(M)	40,599	42,447
189	Madurai East	DMK	81,573	CPI(M)	51,925	29,648
191	Madurai North	DMK	64,425	CPI(M)	48,470	15,955
192	Madurai South	DMK	59,354	CPI(M)	48,880	10,474
193	Madurai Central	DMK	71,943	CPI(M)	47,125	24,818
194	Madurai West	DMK	70,347	CPI(M)	53,158	17,189
Theni Lok Sabha constituency
190	Sholavandhan	AIADMK	54,277	INC	48,240	6,037
197	Usilampatti	INC	60,093	AIADMK	56,424	3,669
198	Andipatti	AIADMK	60,228	INC	54,520	5,708
199	Periyakulam (SC)	INC	56,113	AIADMK	51,965	4,148
200	Bodinayakkanur	INC	59,068	AIADMK	57,326	1,742
201	Cumbum	INC	62,402	AIADMK	54,028	8,374
Virudhunagar Lok Sabha constituency
195	Thiruparankundram	MDMK	61,864	INC	52,020	9,844
196	Thirumangalam	INC	66,306	MDMK	53,474	12,832
204	Sattur	MDMK	52,529	INC	49,843	2,686
205	Sivakasi	MDMK	40,580	INC	39,825	755
206	Virudhunagar	INC	45,427	MDMK	37,641	7,786
207	Aruppukkottai	INC	52,766	MDMK	45,001	7,765
Ramanathapuram Lok Sabha constituency
183	Aranthangi	DMK	39,460	BJP	28,917	10,543
208	Thiruchuli	DMK	56,467	AIADMK	42,452	14,015
209	Paramakudi	DMK	45,218	AIADMK	43,113	2,105
210	Thiruvadanai	DMK	53,840	AIADMK	31,867	21,973
211	Ramanathapuram	DMK	47,850	AIADMK	38,698	9,152
212	Mudukulathur	DMK	50,425	AIADMK	47,032	3,393
Thoothukudi Lok Sabha constituency
213	Vilathikulam	DMK	54,691	AIADMK	41,037	13,654
214	Thoothukudi	DMK	54,996	AIADMK	44,028	10,968
215	Tiruchendur	DMK	51,299	AIADMK	37,788	13,511
216	Srivaikundam	DMK	56,605	AIADMK	35,806	20,799
217	Ottapidaram (SC)	DMK	52,351	AIADMK	32,960	19,361
218	Kovilpatti	AIADMK	42,704	DMK	41,030	1,674
Tenkasi Lok Sabha constituency
202	Rajapalayam	CPI	49,592	INC	32,118	17,474
203	Srivilliputhur	CPI	51,402	INC	35,267	16,135
219	Sankarankovil	CPI	46,074	INC	34,706	11,368
220	Vasudevanallur (SC)	CPI	42,784	INC	35,735	7,049
221	Kadayanallur	INC	49,926	CPI	43,649	6,277
222	Tenkasi	INC	57,069	CPI	47,410	9,659
Thirunelveli Lok Sabha constituency
223	Alangulam	INC	52,313	AIADMK	49,811	2,502
224	Thirunelveli	AIADMK	51,679	INC	46,315	5,364
225	Ambasamuthiram	INC	45,498	AIADMK	41,420	4,078
226	Palayamkottai	INC	48,681	AIADMK	33,086	15,595
227	Nanguneri	INC	44,526	AIADMK	38,279	6,247
228	Radhapuram	AIADMK	39,302	INC	36,820	2,482
Kanniyakumari Lok Sabha constituency
229	Kanniyakumari	BJP	52,192	DMK	49,449	2,743
230	Nagercoil	BJP	48,965	DMK	41,476	7,489
231	Colachal	DMK	53,988	BJP	43,542	10,446
232	Padmanabhapuram	DMK	55,703	BJP	41,034	14,669
233	Vilavancode	DMK	60,365	BJP	37,026	23,339
234	Killiyur	DMK	58,987	BJP	31,565	27,422

== See also ==
- Elections in Tamil Nadu
