= Results of the 2009 Indian general election in Tamil Nadu by constituency =

Results of the 15th Lok Sabha election in Tamil Nadu by state assembly constituents.
Overall, in the Indian general election in Tamil Nadu, 2009, United Progressive Alliance (Dravida Munnetra Kazhagam (DMK) and allies) got 27 seats, while United National Progressive Alliance (All India Anna Dravida Munnetra Kazhagam (AIADMK) and allies) got 12 seats.

Key	Alliance
Green:	DMK+
Red:	AIADMK+
(SC)	Seat is reserved for scheduled caste.
(ST)	Seat is reserved for scheduled tribe.

== Result by constituency ==
2009 Indian general elections : Thiruvallur
Party	Candidate	Votes	%	±%
AIADMK	P. Venugopal	3,68,294	43.34	+43.34
DMK	S. Gayathri	3,36,621	39.61	+39.61
DMDK	R. Suresh	1,10,452	13.00	+13.00
BSP	P. Anandan	10,746	1.26	+1.26
Majority		31,673	3.79	−−−−
Turnout		8,49,754	70.57	New
AIADMK win (new seat)				

2009 Indian general elections: Chennai North
Party	Candidate	Votes	%	±%
DMK	T. K. S. Elangovan	2,81,055	42.59	−19.66
CPI	D. Pandian	2,61,902	39.69	
DMDK	V. Yuvaraj	66,375	10.06	
BJP	Tamilisai Soundararajan	23,350	3.54	−20.03
BSP	J. O. R. Santhashrini	3,952	0.60	
Majority		19,153	2.90	
Turnout		6,59,889	64.91	
DMK hold		Swing		

2009 Indian general elections: Chennai South
Party	Candidate	Votes	%	±%
AIADMK	C. Rajendran	3,08,567	42.38	
DMK	R. S. Bharathy	2,75,632	37.86	
DMDK	V. Gopinath	67,291	9.24	
BJP	La Ganesan	42,925	5.90	
IND.	E. Sarath Babu	15,885	2.18	
Majority		32,935	4.52	
Turnout		7,28,113	62.66	
AIADMK gain from DMK		Swing		

2009 Indian general elections: Chennai Central
Party	Candidate	Votes	%	±%
DMK	Dayanidhi Maran	2,85,783	46.82	
AIADMK	S. M. K. Mogamed Ali Jinnah	2,52,329	41.34	
DMDK	V. V. Ramakrishnan	38,959	6.38	
BSP	S. Hyder Ali	13,160	2.16	
SS	Ramchand Raaj	613	0.10	
Majority		33,454	5.48	
Turnout		6,10,744	61.03	
DMK hold		Swing		

2009 Indian general elections: Sriperumbudur
Party	Candidate	Votes	%	±%
DMK	T.R. Baalu	3,52,641	44.41	
PMK	A. K. Moorthy	3,27,605	41.26	
DMDK	M. Arun Subramanian	84,530	10.65	
BSP	Rajappa B	4,483	0.56	
Majority		25,036	3.15	
Turnout		7,94,052	66.10	
DMK hold		Swing		

2009 Indian general elections: Kancheepuram
Party	Candidate	Votes	%	±%
INC	P. Viswanathan	3,30,237	41.96	
AIADMK	Dr. E. Ramakrishnan	3,17,134	40.29	
DMDK	T. Tamilvendan	1,03,560	13.16	
BSP	K. Uthrapathi	5,663	0.72	
Majority		13,103	1.67	
Turnout		7,86,910	74.22	
INC win (new seat)				

2009 Indian general elections: Arakkonam
Party	Candidate	Votes	%	±%
DMK	S. Jagathrakshakan	4,15,041	48.54	
PMK	R. Velu	3,05,245	35.70	
DMDK	S. Sankar	82,038	9.59	
Independent	Panjatsaram D	7,078	0.83	
Majority		1,09,796	12.87	
Turnout		8,54,975	77.82	
DMK gain from PMK		Swing		

2009 Indian general elections: Vellore
Party	Candidate	Votes	%	±%
IUML	M. Abdul Rahman	3,60,474	49.78	
AIADMK	L. K. M. B. Vasu	2,53,081	34.95	
DMDK	Shoukath Sherif	62,696	8.66	
BJP	A. K. Rajendiran	11,184	1.54	
Majority		1,07,393	14.84	
Turnout		7,24,150	71.69	
DMK hold		Swing		

2009 Indian general elections: Krishnagiri
Party	Candidate	Votes	%	±%
DMK	E. G. Sugavanam	3,35,977	44.64	
AIADMK	K. Nanjegowdu	2,59,379	34.47	
DMDK	D. Anbarasan	97,546	12.96	
BJP	G. Balakrishnan	20,486	2.72	
Majority		76,598	10.18	
Turnout		7,52,578	74.16	
DMK hold		Swing		

2009 Indian general elections: Dharmapuri
Party	Candidate	Votes	%	±%
DMK	R. Thamaraiselvan	3,65,812	47.01	
PMK	R. Senthil	2,29,870	29.54	
DMDK	V. Elangovan	1,03,494	13.30	
KNMK	G. Asokan	15,333	1.97	
IND	A. Raja	10,561	1.36	
Majority		1,35,942	17.47	
Turnout		7,78,102	72.75	
DMK gain from PMK		Swing		

2009 Indian general elections: Tiruvannamalai
Party	Candidate	Votes	%	±%
DMK	D. Venugopal	4,36,866	51.97	
PMK	Guru (A) Gurunathan	2,88,566	34.33	
DMDK	S. Manikandan	56,960	6.78	
LJP	Afroz Husna K S	5,798	0.69	
Majority		1,48,300	17.64	
Turnout		8,40,545	79.89	
DMK win (new seat)				

2009 Indian general elections: Arani
Party	Candidate	Votes	%	±%
INC	M. Krishnaswamy	3,96,728	47.16	
AIADMK	N. Subramaniyan	2,89,898	34.46	
DMDK	Ra. Mohanam	1,05,729	12.57	
IND	M. Velaudham	14,919	1.77	
Majority		1,06,830	12.70	
Turnout		8,41,204	76.62	
INC win (new seat)				

2009 Indian general elections: Viluppuram
Party	Candidate	Votes	%	±%
AIADMK	M. Anandan	306,826	38.53	New
VCK	K. Swamidurai	304,029	38.17	New
DMDK	P. M. Ganapathi	127,476	16.01	New
Independent	M. Kumar	14,770	1.85	New
Majority		2,797	0.36	New
Turnout		796,414	74.56	New
AIADMK win (new seat)				

2009 Indian general elections: Kallakurichi
Party	Candidate	Votes	%	±%
DMK	Adhi Shankar	3,63,601	42.53	
PMK	K. Dhanaraju	2,54,993	29.83	
DMDK	L. K. Sudhish	1,32,223	15.47	
KMDK	S. Ramesh	17,818	2.08	
Independent	A. Arun Kennadi	13,216	1.55	
Majority		1,08,608	12.70	
Turnout		8,54,955	77.23	N/A
DMK win (new seat)				

2009 Indian general elections: Salem
Party	Candidate	Votes	%	±%
AIADMK	S. Semmalai	3,80,460	42.48	+6.22
INC	K. V. Thangkabalu	3,33,969	37.29	−22.64
DMDK	Alagaapuram R.Mohanraj	1,20,325	13.44	−
Independent	C.Selladurai	23,056	2.57	n/a
Majority		46,491	5.19	−18.48
Turnout		8,95,554	76.42	+17.17
AIADMK gain from INC		Swing	+6.22	

2009 Indian general elections: Namakkal
Party	Candidate	Votes	%	±%
DMK	S. Gandhiselvan	3,71,476	43.89	New
AIADMK	V. Vairam Tamilarasi	2,69,045	31.79	New
DMDK	N. Maheswaran	79,420	9.38	New
KNMK	R. Devarasan	52,433	6.19	New
Majority		1,02,431	12.12	New
Turnout		8,46,365	78.69	New
DMK win (new seat)				

2009 Indian general election : Erode
Party	Candidate	Votes	%	±%
MDMK	A. Ganeshamurthi	284,148	37.12%	
INC	E. V. K. S. Elangovan	2,34,812	30.67%	
KNMK	C. Balasubramaniam	1,06,604	13.93%	
DMDK	Muthu Venkateshwaran	91,008	11.89%	
BJP	N. P. Palanisamy	8,429	1.10%	
Independent	S. Sivasankar	6,802	0.89%	
Margin of victory		49,336	6.44%	
Turnout		7,65,501	75.98%	
Registered electors		10,10,079		
MDMK win (new seat)				

2009 Indian general election : Nilgiris
Party	Candidate	Votes	%	±%
DMK	A. Raja	316,802	44.67%	
MDMK	C. Krishnan	2,30,781	32.54%	
DMDK	S. Selvaraj	76,613	10.80%	
KNMK	S. Bhadiran	32,776	4.62%	
BJP	S. Gurumurthy	18,690	2.64%	−30.35%
Independent	C. Velmurugan	11,979	1.69%	
Independent	G. Nagaraju	8,821	1.24%	
Margin of victory		86,021	12.13%	−18.16%
Turnout		7,09,158	70.75%	11.42%
Registered electors		10,03,168		−23.86%
DMK gain from INC		Swing	-18.60%	

2009 Indian general election : Tiruppur
Party	Candidate	Votes	%	±%
AIADMK	C. Sivasamy	295,731	39.92%	
INC	S. K. Kharventhan	2,10,385	28.40%	
KNMK	K. Balasubramanian	95,299	12.86%	
DMDK	N. Dinesh Kumar	86,933	11.73%	
BJP	M. Sivakumar	11,466	1.55%	
Independent	R. Pandian Alais Kalaimagal Pandian	10,356	1.40%	
Margin of victory		85,346	11.52%	
Turnout		7,40,857	74.64%	
Registered electors		9,93,758		
AIADMK win (new seat)				

2009 Indian general election : Coimbatore
Party	Candidate	Votes	%	±%
CPI(M)	P. R. Natarajan	293,165	35.64%	
INC	R. Prabhu	2,54,501	30.94%	
KNMK	E. R. Eswaran	1,28,070	15.57%	
DMDK	R. Pandian	73,188	8.90%	
BJP	G. K. S. Selvakumar	37,909	4.61%	−34.13%
Margin of victory		38,664	4.70%	−14.02%
Turnout		8,22,566	70.81%	15.20%
Registered electors		11,63,781		−26.54%
CPI(M) gain from CPI		Swing	-21.82%	

2009 Indian general election : Pollachi
Party	Candidate	Votes	%	±%
AIADMK	K. Sugumar	305,935	39.77%	1.81%
DMK	K. Shamugasundaram	2,59,910	33.79%	
KNMK	Best S. Ramasamy	1,03,004	13.39%	
DMDK	K. P. Thangavel	38,824	5.05%	
BJP	V. S. Baba Ramesh	16,815	2.19%	
MNMK	E. Ummar	13,933	1.81%	
Independent	P. Sukumar	5,660	0.74%	
Margin of victory		46,025	5.98%	−12.82%
Turnout		7,69,303	75.80%	13.71%
Registered electors		10,17,811		−2.07%
AIADMK gain from MDMK		Swing	-17.00%	

2009 Indian general election : Dindigul
Party	Candidate	Votes	%	±%
INC	N. S. V. Chitthan	361,545	44.10%	−14.88%
AIADMK	P. Baalasubramani	3,07,198	37.47%	0.97%
DMDK	P. Muthuvelraj	1,00,788	12.29%	
BSP	M. Srinivasa Babu	6,960	0.85%	0.12%
Independent	K. A. Motilal	6,706	0.82%	
KNMK	M. Sellamuthu K	6,411	0.78%	
Independent	K. Durai	6,063	0.74%	
Independent	G. Manikanda Prabu	5,331	0.65%	
Margin of victory		54,347	6.63%	−15.85%
Turnout		10,85,696	75.51%	14.83%
Rejected ballots		3	0.00%	
Registered electors		8,19,860		−4.54%
INC hold		Swing	-14.88%	

2009 Indian general election : Karur
Party	Candidate	Votes	%	±%
AIADMK	M. Thambidurai	380,542	46.21%	11.31%
DMK	K. C. Palanisamy	3,33,288	40.48%	−20.10%
DMDK	R. Ramanathan	51,196	6.22%	
KNMK	R. Natarajan	14,269	1.73%	
Independent	K. Shankar	6,519	0.79%	
Independent	T. Karventhan	5,553	0.67%	
BSP	R. Dharmalingam	5,413	0.66%	
Margin of victory		47,254	5.74%	−19.93%
Turnout		8,23,421	81.43%	11.76%
Registered electors		10,12,924		−5.28%
AIADMK gain from DMK		Swing	-14.36%	

2009 Indian general election : Tiruchirappalli
Party	Candidate	Votes	%	±%
AIADMK	P. Kumar	298,710	41.65%	8.58%
INC	Charubala Tondaiman	2,94,375	41.05%	
DMDK	A. M. G. Vijaykumar	61,742	8.61%	
BJP	R. Lalitha Kumaramangalam	30,329	4.23%	
Makkal Manadu	P. Ravi	5,016	0.70%	
BSP	N. Kalyana Sundaram	4,897	0.68%	0.06%
Margin of victory		4,335	0.60%	−30.00%
Turnout		7,17,165	67.33%	7.81%
Registered electors		10,67,193		−10.49%
AIADMK gain from MDMK		Swing	-22.02%	
