= C. T. Dhandapani =

Indian politician

Member of Parliament
- In office 1967–1977
- Prime Minister: Indira Gandhi
- Preceded by: Constituency established
- Succeeded by: Constituency abolished
- Constituency: Dharapuram
- In office 1980–1984
- Prime Minister: Indira Gandhi
- Preceded by: K. A. Raju
- Succeeded by: R. Anna Nambi
- Constituency: Pollachi

Member of Legislative Assembly
- In office 1996–2001
- Chief Minister: M. Karunanidhi
- Preceded by: K. Selvaraj
- Succeeded by: S. Maheswari
- Constituency: Coimbatore West

Personal details
- Born: March 19, 1933 Coimbatore, Tamil Nadu
- Died: October 28, 2001 (aged 68) Coimbatore, Tamil Nadu

C. T. Dhandapani (March 19, 1933 – October 28, 2001) was an Indian politician and former Member of Parliament elected from Tamil Nadu. He was elected to the Lok Sabha from Dharapuram Lok Sabha constituency as a Dravida Munnetra Kazhagam candidate in 1967, 1971 and 1980 elections.

He also served as the Member of the Legislative Assembly of Tamil Nadu. He was elected to the Tamil Nadu legislative assembly as a Dravida Munnetra Kazhagam candidate from Coimbatore West constituency in 1996 election.

== Elections contested ==
=== Lok Sabha Elections ===
Elections	Constituency	Party	Result	Vote percentage	Opposition Candidate	Opposition Party	Opposition vote percentage
1967 Indian general election	Dharapuram	DMK	Won	60.6	S.R. Arumugham	INC	34.8
1971 Indian general election	Dharapuram	DMK	Won	64.38	K Paramalai	INC(O)	35.62
1977 Indian general election	Pollachi	DMK	Lost	33.61	K.A.Raju	AIADMK	64.48
1980 Indian general election	Pollachi	DMK	Won	51.41	M. A. M. Natarajan	AIADMK	47.94
1984 Indian general election	Nilgiris	DMK	Lost	47.94	R. Prabhu	INC	60.31
1991 Indian general election	Pollachi	DMK	Lost	37.03	B. Raja Ravi Varma	AIADMK	65.65

=== Tamilnadu Legislative Assembly Elections ===
Elections	Constituency	Party	Result	Vote percentage	Opposition Candidate	Opposition Party	Opposition vote percentage
1989 Tamil Nadu Legislative Assembly election	Avanashi	DMK	Lost	30.53	Annanambi. R.	AIADMK(J)	32.60
1996 Tamil Nadu Legislative Assembly election	Coimbatore West	DMK	Won	62.47	Raja Thangavel	INC	16.15
2001 Tamil Nadu Legislative Assembly election	Coimbatore West	DMK	Lost	38.58	Maheswari S	INC	51.44
