= C. Shanmugavelu =

Indian politician

Member of the Tamil Nadu Legislative Assembly
- In office 2011–2016
- Preceded by: New constituency
- Succeeded by: R. Jayaramakrishnan
- Constituency: Madathukulam

Member of the Tamil Nadu Legislative Assembly
- In office 2001–2011
- Preceded by: P. Ranganathan
- Succeeded by: K. R. Jayaram
- Constituency: Udumalpet

Minister for Rural Industries, Tamil Nadu
- In office 2011 – November 2011
- Preceded by: Pongalur N. Palanisamy
- Succeeded by: S. Sundararaj

Personal details
- Party: AMMK
- Profession: Politician

C. Shanmugavelu is an Indian politician and former member of Tamil Nadu Legislative Assembly elected from Madathukulam constituency in 2011. Previously, he was elected to the Tamil Nadu legislative assembly as an Anna Dravida Munnetra Kazhagam candidate from Udumalpet constituency in 2001 and 2006 elections in which he served as a minister for a short period.

Shanmugavelu was sacked as Minister for Rural Industries in November 2011 as part of the third cabinet reshuffle in five months by Chief Minister Jayalalithaa.

== Elections Contested ==
=== Tamilnadu State Legislative Assembly Elections Contested ===
Elections	Constituency	Party	Result	Vote percentage	Opposition Candidate	Opposition Party	Opposition vote percentage
1996	Udumalaipettai	AIADMK	Lost	34.09	D. Selvaraj	DMK	52.53
2001	Udumalaipettai	AIADMK	Won	56.92	D. Selvaraj	DMK	28.14
2006	Udumalaipettai	AIADMK	Won	46.09	C. Veluchamy	DMK	43.68
2011	Madathukulam	AIADMK	Won	54.71	M. P. Saminathan	DMK	41.02
2021	Madathukulam	AMMK	Lost	3.58	C. Mahendran	AIADMK	46.35

== See also ==
- Politics of India
