= 1967 Indian general election in Madras State =

Indian general election in Madras, 1967
- February 1967

39 (of 520) seats in the Lok Sabha
- Registered: 20,796,700
- Turnout: 15,922,449 (76.56%) ▲7.79%
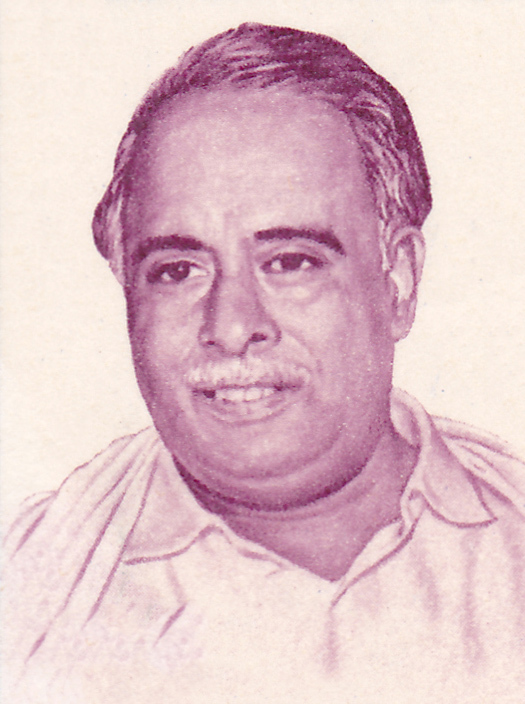

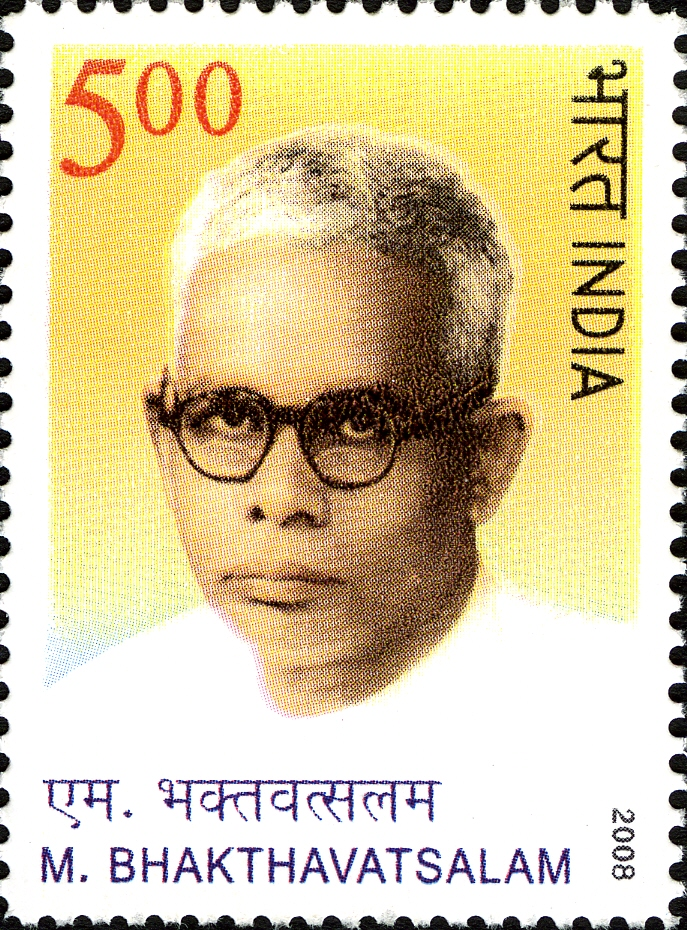
	First party	Second party
Leader	C.N. Annadurai	M. Bhaktavatsalam
Party	DMK	INC
Leader's seat	Madras South	Did not contest
Seats won	36	3
Seat change	▲29	▼28
Popular vote	8,176,656	6,436,710
Percentage	52.96%	41.69%
Swing	▲22.48%	▼3.57%
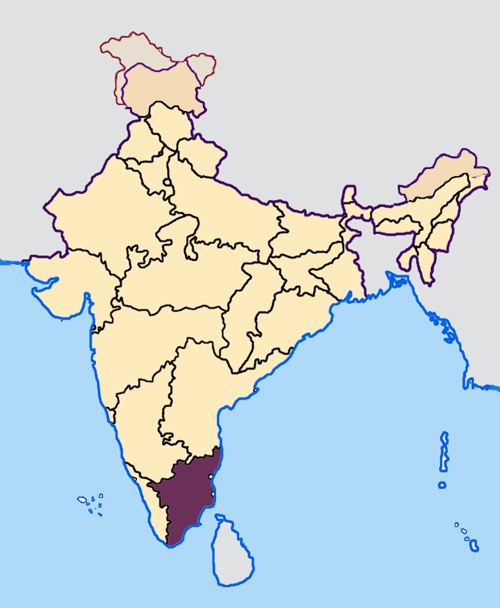
- Tamil Nadu
Prime Minister before election
Indira Gandhi
INC
Prime Minister after election
Indira Gandhi
INC

The 1967 Indian general election polls in Tamil Nadu were held for 39 seats in the state. The result was a huge victory for Dravida Munnetra Kazhagam, led by C.N. Annadurai and its ally Swatantra Party, led by C. Rajagopalachari. Madras was the first and one of few states, where a non-Congress Party won more seats than Congress in a state. A huge wave of anti-incumbency against the Congress was present in Madras, 1967, which led to the defeat of the popular leader K. Kamaraj and his party in both the state and national elections, won by DMK and its allies. After this election, the DMK supported the Congress party under Indira Gandhi.

== Seat Allotment ==
=== United Front ===
No.	Party	Election Symbol	Leader	Seats
1.	Dravida Munnetra Kazhagam		C. N. Annadurai	25
2.	Swatantra Party		C. Rajagopalachari	7
3.	Communist Party of India (Marxist)		M. R. Venkataraman	6
Unrecognized parties, whose candidates ran as an independent supported by DMK
4.	Indian Union Muslim League (Note: Scales Symbol was Independent Symbol throughout India, except Punjab in 1967 elections.)		Muhammed Ismail	1

=== Congress ===
No.	Party	Election Symbol	Leader	Seats
1.	Indian National Congress		K. Kamaraj	39

== Voting and results ==
Alliance	Party	Popular Vote	Percentage	Swing	Seats won	Seat Change
United Front	Dravida Munnetra Kazhagam	5,524,514	35.78%	▲17.14%	25	▲18
United Front	Swatantra Party	1,414,208	9.16%	▼1.31%	6	▲6
United Front	Communist Party of India (Marxist)	1,057,542	6.85%	new party	4	new party
United Front	Independent	180,392	1.17%	▼0.20%	1	▲1
United Front	Total	8,176,656	52.96%	▲22.48%	36	▲29
Indian National Congress		6,436,710	41.69%	▼3.57%	3	▼28
Communist Party of India		299,841	1.69%	▼8.55%	0	▼2
Bharatiya Jana Sangh		33,626	0.22%	▲0.18%	0	Steady
Republican Party of India		31,451	0.20%	▼1.54%	0	Steady
Praja Socialist Party		12,162	0.08%	▼1.60%	0	Steady
Independents		448,648	3.16%	▼4.35%	0	Steady
Total		15,439,094	100.00%	Steady	39	▼2
Valid Votes		15,439,094	96.96%			
Invalid Votes		483,355	3.04%			
Total Votes		15,922,449	100.00%			
Registered Voters/Turnout		20,796,700	76.56%	▲7.79%		

== List of Elected MPs ==
Constituency		Winner				Runner Up				Margin	%
#	Name	Candidate	Party	Votes	%	Candidate	Party	Votes	%	Margin	%
1	Madras North	K. Manoharan	DMK	227,783	56.32	S. C. C. A. Pillai	INC	166,449	41.15	61,334	15.17
2	Madras South	C. N. Annadurai	DMK	248,099	59.38	K. Gurumurti	INC	166,121	39.76	81,978	19.62
3	Sriperumbudur (SC)	P. Sivasankaran	DMK	271,528	60.61	K. Sambandan	INC	169,763	37.89	101,765	22.72
4	Chingleput	C. C. Babu	DMK	255,845	61.32	D. V. Alagesan	INC	150,114	35.98	105,731	25.34
5	Tiruttani	S. K. Sambandhan	DMK	225,229	55.61	A. Krishnaswamy	INC	149,680	36.96	75,549	18.65
6	Vellore (SC)	Kuchelar	DMK	203,887	55.83	A. Jayaraman	INC	134,155	36.74	69,732	19.09
7	Tirupattur	R. M. Gounder	DMK	188,309	54.21	T. A. Wahid	INC	159,078	45.79	29,231	8.42
8	Wandiwash	G. Viswanathan	DMK	213,537	55.26	M. K. Gounder	INC	132,878	34.39	80,659	20.87
9	Tindivanam	T. D. R. Naidu	DMK	201,009	49.54	Lakshminarayanan	INC	168,939	41.64	32,070	7.90
10	Cuddalore	V. K. Gounder	DMK	225,571	55.95	S. Radhakrishnan	INC	177,598	44.05	47,973	11.90
11	Chidambaram (SC)	V. Mayavan	DMK	205,193	52.22	L. Elayaperumal	INC	187,764	47.78	17,429	4.44
12	Kallakurichi	M. Deiveekan	DMK	193,043	52.81	K. Parthasarathy	INC	166,520	45.55	26,523	7.26
13	Krishnagiri	M. Kamalanathan	DMK	165,079	50.78	T. S. Pattabiraman	INC	146,785	45.15	18,294	5.63
14	Salem	K. Rajaram	DMK	219,380	57.07	R. Ramakrishnan	INC	155,871	40.55	63,509	16.52
15	Mettur	S. Kandappan	DMK	184,004	53.14	G. Venkatraman	INC	127,159	36.72	56,845	16.42
16	Tiruchengode	K. Anbazhagan	DMK	232,365	55.29	T. M. Kaliannan	INC	184,114	43.81	48,251	11.48
17	Nilgiris	M. K. N. Gowder	SWA	167,712	48.06	A. Devi	INC	148,010	42.41	19,702	5.65
18	Coimbatore	K. Ramani	CPI(M)	240,856	57.93	N. Mahalingam	INC	174,935	42.07	65,921	15.86
19	Pollachi	Narayanan	DMK	237,035	58.56	S. K. Paramasivam	INC	155,281	38.36	81,754	20.20
20	Dharapuram (SC)	C. T. Dhandapani	DMK	259,768	62.39	S. R. Arumugham	INC	148,902	35.77	110,866	26.62
21	Gobichettipalayam	P. A. Saminathan	DMK	203,798	54.51	C. Subramaniam	INC	154,853	41.42	48,945	13.09
22	Periyakulam	H. Ajmalkhan	SWA	183,593	45.34	M. Ibrahim	INC	155,972	38.52	27,621	6.82
23	Dindigul	N. Anbuchezhian	DMK	260,065	62.40	T. S. S. Ramachndran	INC	156,719	37.60	103,346	24.80
24	Madurai	P. Ramamurti	CPI(M)	261,390	60.18	S. C. Thevar	INC	155,922	35.90	105,468	24.28
25	Karur	M. Gounder	SWA	209,380	53.00	R. Chettiar	INC	185,662	47.00	23,718	6.00
26	Tiruchirapalli	K. A. Nambiar	CPI(M)	202,879	50.32	V. A. Muthiah	INC	200,334	49.68	2,545	0.64
27	Perambalur (SC)	A. Durairasu	DMK	229,941	53.97	P. K. Ramaswamy	INC	196,113	46.03	33,828	7.94
28	Pudukkottai	R. Umanath	CPI(M)	199,469	48.25	A. N. Chettiar	INC	190,087	45.98	9,382	2.27
29	Kumbakonam	S. Era	DMK	213,866	50.19	C. R. P. Raman	INC	193,827	45.49	20,039	4.70
30	Mayuram (SC)	K. Subravelu	DMK	209,660	57.09	M. Chandrasekhar	INC	157,616	42.91	52,044	14.18
31	Nagapattinam	V. Sambasivam	INC	164,167	41.78	V. P. Chintan	CPI(M)	152,948	38.93	11,219	2.85
32	Thanjavur	D. S. Gopalar	DMK	225,414	52.64	R. Venkataraman	INC	202,840	47.36	22,574	5.28
33	Sivaganga	Kiruttinan	DMK	225,106	53.17	Subramanian	INC	166,889	39.42	58,217	13.75
34	Ramanathapuram	M. Sheriff	IND	180,392	47.23	S. Balakrishnan	INC	148,367	38.84	32,025	8.39
35	Sivakasi	P. Ramamoorthy	SWA	194,364	47.08	P. A. Nadar	INC	162,692	39.41	31,672	7.67
36	Tirunelveli	S. Xavier	SWA	186,864	48.12	A. P. C. Veerabahu	INC	144,873	37.31	41,991	10.81
37	Tenkasi (SC)	R. S. Arumugam	INC	166,737	41.52	Velu	SWA	160,991	40.09	5,746	1.43
38	Tiruchendur	Santosham	SWA	183,053	46.90	K. T. Kosalram	INC	182,659	46.79	394	0.11
39	Nagercoil	A. Nesamony	INC	180,265	53.38	M. Mathias	SWA	128,251	37.98	52,014	15.40

== See also ==
- Elections in Tamil Nadu

== Bibliography ==
Volume I, 1967 Indian general election, 4th Lok Sabha
