= N. Kovaithangam =

Indian politician

Member of Legislative Assembly
- In office 13 May 2001 – 13 May 2011
- Chief Minister: O. Panneerselvam; J.Jayalalithaa; M. Karunanidhi
- Preceded by: V. P. Singaravelu
- Succeeded by: M. Arumugham
- Constituency: Valparai

Personal details
- Born: 1948
- Died: October 12, 2022 Coimbatore, Tamil Nadu
- Party: Dravida Munnetra Kazhagam (2021-2022)
- Other political affiliations: Tamil Maanila Congress (1996-2004 and 2014-2021); Indian National Congress (Before 1996 and 2004-2014)
- Occupation: Politician

N. Kovaithangam (c. 1949 – 12 October 2022) was an Indian politician.

== Political career ==
He was elected to the Tamil Nadu legislative assembly as a Tamil Maanila Congress candidate from Valparai constituency in 2001 and as Indian National Congress candidate in 2006 elections. On 23 March he joined DMK in presence of party president M. K. Stalin.

== Elections Contested ==
=== Tamilnadu State Legislative Assembly Elections ===
Elections	Constituency	Party	Result	Vote percentage	Opposition Candidate	Opposition Party	Opposition vote percentage
2001 Tamil Nadu Legislative Assembly election	Valparai	TMC(M)	Won	53.21	Dr. K Krishnaswamy	PT	33.11
2006 Tamil Nadu Legislative Assembly election	Valparai	INC	Won	53.94	S. Susi Kalayarasan	VCK	29.64
2011 Tamil Nadu Legislative Assembly election	Valparai	INC	Lost	49.16	M. Arumugham	CPI	46.41

=== Lok Sabha Elections ===
Elections	Constituency	Party	Result	Vote percentage	Opposition Candidate	Opposition Party	Opposition vote percentage
1998 Indian general election	Pollachi	TMC(M)	Lost	38.01	M. Thiyagarajan	AIADMK	55.22

== Achievements ==
He was instrumental in setting up an Arts and Science college in Valparai. During his tenure, he developed a good rapport with the tea estate workers in the constituency.

== Death ==
He died at a private hospital in Coimbatore due to cardiac arrest on 12 October 2022.
