= C. Mahendran =

Indian politician

- சி. மகேந்திரன்

Member of the Tamil Nadu Legislative Assembly
- In office 12 May 2021 – 6 May 2026
- Preceded by: R. Jayaramakrishnan
- Succeeded by: R. Jayaramakrishnan
- Constituency: Madathukulam

Member of Parliament, Lok Sabha
- In office 1 September 2014 – 23 May 2019
- Preceded by: K. Sugumar
- Succeeded by: K. Shamugasundaram
- Constituency: Pollachi

Personal details
- Born: 4 May 1972 (age 54) Moongiltholuvu, Tiruppur, Tamil Nadu
- Party: Tamilaga Vetri Kazhagam
- Spouse: Smt. Arulselvi Mahendran
- Children: 1
- Education: PSG College of Arts and Science
- Occupation: Agriculturist, Politician
- As of 17 December, 2016

C. Mahendran (born 1972) is an Indian politician and Member of Tamil Nadu Legislative Assembly elected from Madathukulam constituency in 2021 elections. He was previously elected to the 16th Lok Sabha, the lower house of the Parliament of India from Pollachi constituency as an All India Anna Dravida Munnetra Kazhagam candidate in 2014 election.

He was the panchayat President of the Moongiltholuvu Panchayat in Tirupur district. He completed his M.A.(Economics) in PSG College of Arts and Science, Coimbatore. He is also an agriculturalist.

== Elections contested ==
=== Lok Sabha elections ===
Elections	Constituency	Party	Result	Vote percentage	Opposition Candidate	Opposition Party	Opposition vote percentage
2014 Indian general election	Pollachi	AIADMK	Won	41.19	E. R. Eswaran	KMDK	27.27
2019 Indian general election	Pollachi	AIADMK	Lost	34.97	K. Shamugasundaram	DMK	51.20

=== Tamilnadu State Legislative Assembly Elections Contested ===
Elections	Constituency	Party	Result	Vote percentage	Opposition Candidate	Opposition Party	Opposition vote percentage
2021	Madathukulam	AIADMK	Won	46.35	R. Jayaramakrishnan	DMK	42.81
