= A. Sudhakar =

Indian politician (born 1977)

Member of the Tamil Nadu Legislative Assembly
- Incumbent
- Assumed office 11 May 2026
- Preceded by: T. K. Amulkandasami
- Constituency: Valparai

Personal details
- Party: Dravida Munnetra Kazhagam

Arokkiyam Sudhakar (born 1977), also known as Kutty, is an Indian politician from Tamil Nadu. He is a member of the Tamil Nadu Legislative Assembly from the Valparai Assembly constituency, which is reserved for Scheduled Caste community in Coimbatore district, representing the Dravida Munnetra Kazhagam.

== Early life ==
Sudhakar is from Valparai, Coimbatore district, Tamil Nadu. He is the son of Arokkiyam. He passed Class 12 at Pasumalai Higher Secondary School, Madurai, in 1994. He runs his own business. His wife is a Municipal Councilor in the Valparai Municipality and is also serving as a member of the District Planning Committee. He declared assets worth Rs.87 lakhs in his affidavit filed with the Election Commission of India.

== Career ==
Sudhakar won the Valparai Assembly constituency representing the Dravida Munnetra Kazhagam in the 2026 Tamil Nadu Legislative Assembly election. He polled 57,671 votes and defeated his nearest rival, A. Sridharan of the Tamilaga Vettri Kazhagam, by a margin of 9,371 votes.
