= Dharapuram Lok Sabha constituency =

Dharapuram
- Former Lok Sabha constituency

Constituency details
- Country: India
- State: Madras
- District: Coimbatore
- Assembly constituencies: Valparai; Udumalpet; Dharapuram; Vellakoil; Oddanchatram; Palani
- Established: 1967
- Abolished: 1977
- Reservation: SC

Dharapuram Lok Sabha constituency was No. 20 of 39 Lok Sabha constituencies in Madras State from 1967 to 1969. And it was in Tamil Nadu from 1969 till its abolition in 1977. It was in then Coimbatore district and parts of Madurai district. It lies in present-day Coimbatore district, Tiruppur district and Dindigul district.

== Assembly segments ==
Dharapuram Lok Sabha constituency is composed of the following assembly segments:

| No | Name | District | Reserved for (SC/ST/None) | Current Lok Sabha constituency |
|---|---|---|---|---|
| 109 | Valparai | Coimbatore | SC | Pollachi |
| 110 | Udumalpet | Coimbatore | None | Pollachi |
| 111 | Dharapuram | Coimbatore | SC | Erode |
| 112 | Vellakoil | Coimbatore | None | Defunct |
| 125 | Oddanchatram | Madurai | None | Dindigul |
| 126 | Palani | Madurai | SC | Dindigul |

== Members of the Parliament ==
| Year | Member | Party |
|---|---|---|
| 1967 | C. T. Dhandapani | Dravida Munnetra Kazhagam |
| 1971 | C. T. Dhandapani | Dravida Munnetra Kazhagam |

== Election results ==
Vote share of Winning candidates
| 1967 | 62.39% |
| 1971 | 64.38% |

=== 1971 ===
1971 Indian general election : Dharapuram
| Party | Candidate | Votes | % | ±% |
|---|---|---|---|---|
| DMK | C. T. Dhandapani | 260,113 | 64.38 | |
| INC(O) | K. Paramalai | 1,43,927 | 35.62 | |
| Margin of victory | | 1,16,186 | 28.76 | |
| Total valid votes | | 4,04,040 | | |
| Rejected ballots | | 12,528 | 3.01 | |
| Turnout | | 4,16,568 | 68.67 | |
| Registered electors | | 6,06,592 | | |
| DMK hold | | Swing | | |

=== 1967 ===
1967 Indian general election : Dharapuram
| Party | Candidate | Votes | % | ±% |
|---|---|---|---|---|
| DMK | C. T. Dhandapani | 259,768 | 62.39 | |
| INC | S. R. Arumugham | 1,48,902 | 35.77 | |
| Independent | P. Muthusamy | 7662 | 1.84 | |
| Margin of victory | | 1,10,866 | 26.63 | |
| Total valid votes | | 4,16,332 | | |
| Rejected ballots | | 12,069 | 2.82 | |
| Turnout | | 4,28,401 | 76 | |
| Registered electors | | 5,63,703 | | |
| DMK win (new seat) | | | | |
