= Eswarasamy =

Indian politician

K. Eswaraswamy

Member of Parliament, Lok Sabha
- Incumbent
- Assumed office 2024
- Preceded by: K. Shamugasundaram
- Constituency: Pollachi

Personal details
- Born: 20 April 1976 (age 50)
- Party: Dravida Munnetra Kazhagam
- Occupation: Politician

K Eswarasamy is an Indian politician. He is a member of the Lok Sabha representing the Pollachi constituency in the state of Tamil Nadu and the Dravida Munnetra Kazhagam (DMK).

== Political career ==
Eswaraswamy was elected to the Lok Sabha, lower house of the Parliament of India from Pollachi, Tamil Nadu in the 2024 Indian general election as member of the Dravida Munnetra Kazhagam.
