= R. Jayaramakrishnan =

Indian politician (born 1967)

Member of the Tamil Nadu Legislative Assembly
- Incumbent
- Assumed office 11 May 2026
- Preceded by: C. Mahendran
- Constituency: Madathukulam
- In office 19 May 2016 – 12 May 2021
- Preceded by: C. Shanmugavelu
- Succeeded by: C. Mahendran
- Constituency: Madathukulam

Personal details
- Party: Dravida Munnetra Kazhagam

R. Jayaramakrishnan is an Indian politician and a member of the Tamil Nadu Legislative Assembly (MLA). He belongs to the Madathukulam region in the Tiruppur district. Jayaramakrishnan completed his Bachelor of Science (B.Sc.) degree at Coimbatore Ramakrishna College of Arts and Science and his Bachelor of Laws (B.L.) degree at J.S.S. Law College, Bengaluru. He belongs to the Dravida Munnetra Kazhagam (DMK) party. He contested and won the Madathukulam Assembly constituency in the 2016 Tamil Nadu Legislative Assembly election and subsequently became an MLA.

He again became as a MLA of Madathukulam in 2026 election.

== Electoral Performance ==
=== 2016 ===
2016 Tamil Nadu Legislative Assembly election: Madathukulam
Party	Candidate	Votes	%	±%
DMK	R. Jayaramakrishnan	76,619	44.66%	3.64%
AIADMK	Manoharan K	74,952	43.69%	−11.02%
TMC(M)	Maheswari A S	6,208	3.62%	
BJP	Muthukumar A	2,619	1.53%	0.72%
PMK	Ravichandran A	2,443	1.42%	
NOTA	None Of The Above	2,147	1.25%	
KMDK	Kumaragurubaran	1,573	0.92%	
Independent	Manoharan S	1,450	0.85%	
NTK	Ravishankar C	980	0.57%	
BSP	Alavudeen S	783	0.46%	0.04%
Independent	Veeramanickam S	569	0.33%	
Margin of victory		1,667	0.97%	−12.72%
Turnout		1,71,544	76.09%	−5.40%
Registered electors		2,25,451		
DMK gain from AIADMK		Swing	-10.05%	
