= M. Arumugham =

Indian politician

M. Arumugham is an Indian politician and was a member of the 14th Tamil Nadu Legislative Assembly from the Valparai constituency. He represented the Communist Party of India.

The elections of 2016 resulted in his constituency being won by V. Kasthuri Vasu.

== Electoral Career ==
=== Tamilnadu Legislative Assembly Elections ===
Elections	Constituency	Party	Result	Vote percentage	Opposition Candidate	Opposition Party	Opposition vote percentage
2006 Tamil Nadu Legislative Assembly election	Avanashi	CPI	Lost	37.20	Prema. R	AIADMK	40.57
2011 Tamil Nadu Legislative Assembly election	Valparai	CPI	Won	49.16	N. Kovaithangam	INC	46.41
2016 Tamil Nadu Legislative Assembly election	Avanashi	CPI	Lost	7.74	P. Dhanapal	AIADMK	48.11
2021 Tamil Nadu Legislative Assembly election	Valparai	CPI	Lost	40.93	T. K. Amulkandasami	AIADMK	49.34
