= Valparai Assembly constituency =

One of the 234 State Legislative Assembly Constituencies in Tamil Nadu, in India

Coordinates: 10.327556°N 76.955271°E

Valparai
- Constituency No. 124 for the Tamil Nadu Legislative Assembly

Constituency details
- Country: India
- Region: South India
- State: Tamil Nadu
- District: Coimbatore
- Lok Sabha constituency: Pollachi
- Established: 1967
- Total electors: 173,659
- Reservation: SC

Member of Legislative Assembly
- 17th Tamil Nadu Legislative Assembly
- Incumbent Kutty (alias) Sudhakar. A
- Party: DMK
- Elected year: 2026

Valparai is a legislative assembly in Coimbatore district of Tamil Nadu, which includes the city of Valparai. Its State Assembly Constituency number is 124. Valparai Assembly constituency is part of Pollachi Lok Sabha constituency. This seat is reserved for candidates from the Scheduled Castes. It is one of the 234 State Legislative Assembly Constituencies in Tamil Nadu, in India.

== Members of the Legislative Assembly ==
Election	Winner	Party
1967	E. Ramaswamy	Dravida Munnetra Kazhagam
1971	E. Ramaswamy	Dravida Munnetra Kazhagam
1977	R. S. Thangavelu	All India Anna Dravida Munnetra Kazhagam
1980	A. T. Karuppiah	Communist Party of India
1984	V. Thangavelu	Indian National Congress
1989	P. Lakshmi	All India Anna Dravida Munnetra Kazhagam
1991	A. Sridharan	All India Anna Dravida Munnetra Kazhagam
1996	V. P. Singaravelu	Dravida Munnetra Kazhagam
2001	N. Kovaithangam	Tamil Maanila Congress
2006	N. Kovaithangam	Indian National Congress
2011	M. Arumugham	Communist Party of India
2016	V. Kasthuri Vasu	All India Anna Dravida Munnetra Kazhagam
2021	T. K. Amulkandasami	All India Anna Dravida Munnetra Kazhagam
2026	Kutty (alias) A. Sudhakar	Dravida Munnetra Kazhagam

== Election results ==
Vote share of winning candidates
2026	36.34%
2021	49.34%
2016	48.68%
2011	49.16%
2006	53.94%
2001	53.21%
1996	59.50%
1991	60.71%
1989	42.52%
1984	63.46%
1980	56.83%
1977	34.18%
1971	65.35%
1967	66.24%

=== 2026 ===
2026 Tamil Nadu Legislative Assembly election: Valparai
Party	Candidate	Votes	%	±%
DMK	A. Sudhakar	54,671	36.34	New
TVK	Dr.A. Sridharan	45,300	30.11	New
AIADMK	Lekshmana Singh. D	43,728	29.07	▼20.27
NTK	Umadevi. P	5,256	3.49	▼1.76
NOTA	NOTA	675	0.45	▼0.52
Independent	Perumal. K	479	0.32	New
Independent	Lakshmi. N	322	0.21	New
Margin of victory		9,371	6.23	▼2.18
Turnout		1,50,431	86.62	▲15.93
Registered electors		1,73,659		▼31,820
DMK gain from AIADMK		Swing	▲36.34	

=== 2021 ===
2021 Tamil Nadu Legislative Assembly election: Valparai
Party	Candidate	Votes	%	±%
AIADMK	T. K. Amulkandasami	71,672	49.34%	+0.66
CPI	M. Arumugham	59,449	40.93%	+38.5
NTK	C. Kohila	7,632	5.25%	+4.55
MNM	D. Senthilraj	3,314	2.28%	New
NOTA	NOTA	1,415	0.97%	−0.56
DMDK	M. S. Murugaraj	1,335	0.92%	New
Margin of victory		12,223	8.41%	2.68%
Turnout		145,259	70.69%	−2.35%
Rejected ballots		87	0.06%	
Registered electors		205,479		
AIADMK hold		Swing	0.66%	

=== 2016 ===
2016 Tamil Nadu Legislative Assembly election: Valparai
Party	Candidate	Votes	%	±%
AIADMK	V. Kasthuri Vasu	69,980	48.68%	New
DMK	T. Paulpandi	61,736	42.95%	New
CPI	P. Manibharathi	3,494	2.43%	−46.73
BJP	P. Murugesan	2,565	1.78%	−0.04
NOTA	NOTA	2,206	1.53%	New
KMDK	K. V. Anbazhagan	1,284	0.89%	New
NTK	M. Saraladevi	1,019	0.71%	New
Margin of victory		8,244	5.74%	2.99%
Turnout		143,743	73.04%	−3.70%
Registered electors		196,795		
AIADMK gain from CPI		Swing	-0.47%	

=== 2011 ===
2011 Tamil Nadu Legislative Assembly election: Valparai
Party	Candidate	Votes	%	±%
CPI	M. Arumugham	61,171	49.16%	New
INC	N. Kovaithangam	57,750	46.41%	−7.53
BJP	P. Murugesan	2,273	1.83%	−1.49
Independent	M. Rangasami	1,912	1.54%	New
Independent	M. Arumugam	787	0.63%	New
Margin of victory		3,421	2.75%	−21.55%
Turnout		124,440	76.74%	9.23%
Registered electors		162,159		
CPI gain from INC		Swing	-4.78%	

=== 2006 ===
2006 Tamil Nadu Legislative Assembly election: Valparai
Party	Candidate	Votes	%	±%
INC	N. Kovaithangam	46,561	53.94%	New
VCK	S. Kalaiyarasan Susi	25,582	29.64%	New
DMDK	S. Murugaraj	6,845	7.93%	New
BJP	M. Thangavel	2,861	3.31%	New
Independent	Dr. A. Shreedaran	1,696	1.96%	New
BSP	S. Devaki	823	0.95%	New
JD(U)	S. Thilagavathi	521	0.60%	New
Independent	S. Ravichandran	447	0.52%	New
Margin of victory		20,979	24.30%	4.20%
Turnout		86,321	67.51%	4.18%
Registered electors		127,872		
INC gain from TMC(M)		Swing	0.73%	

=== 2001 ===
2001 Tamil Nadu Legislative Assembly election: Valparai
Party	Candidate	Votes	%	±%
TMC(M)	N. Kovaithangam	47,428	53.21%	New
PT	Dr. K Krishnaswamy	29,513	33.11%	New
MDMK	R. Chinnaswami	7,626	8.56%	+3.09
Independent	S. Manoharan	1,425	1.60%	New
Independent	S. Ravichandran	1,223	1.37%	New
Independent	K. Kanagaraj	708	0.79%	New
NCP	K. Pukalendhi	613	0.69%	New
Margin of victory		17,915	20.10%	−7.10%
Turnout		89,131	63.33%	−7.05%
Registered electors		140,873		
TMC(M) gain from DMK		Swing	-6.29%	

=== 1996 ===
1996 Tamil Nadu Legislative Assembly election: Valparai
Party	Candidate	Votes	%	±%
DMK	V. P. Singaravelu	55,284	59.50%	New
AIADMK	Kurichimanimaran	30,012	32.30%	−28.41
MDMK	A. Tamilvanan	5,082	5.47%	New
BJP	A. Karuppasamy	1,244	1.34%	New
Margin of victory		25,272	27.20%	3.94%
Turnout		92,918	70.38%	4.25%
Registered electors		138,911		
DMK gain from AIADMK		Swing	-1.21%	

=== 1991 ===
1991 Tamil Nadu Legislative Assembly election: Valparai
Party	Candidate	Votes	%	±%
AIADMK	A. Sridharan	55,284	60.71%	+18.19
CPI	A. T. Karuppiah	34,100	37.45%	New
JP	M. Kulandairaj	596	0.65%	New
Margin of victory		21,184	23.26%	15.85%
Turnout		91,063	66.13%	−7.85%
Registered electors		142,551		
AIADMK hold		Swing	18.19%	

=== 1989 ===
1989 Tamil Nadu Legislative Assembly election: Valparai
Party	Candidate	Votes	%	±%
AIADMK	P. Lakshmi	38,296	42.52%	New
DMK	D. M. Shanmugam	31,624	35.11%	New
INC	V. Thangavelu	14,842	16.48%	−46.98
Independent	V. M. Thiyagarajan	4,411	4.90%	New
Margin of victory		6,672	7.41%	−22.09%
Turnout		90,063	73.99%	1.82%
Registered electors		124,811		
AIADMK gain from INC		Swing	-20.94%	

=== 1984 ===
1984 Tamil Nadu Legislative Assembly election: Valparai
Party	Candidate	Votes	%	±%
INC	V. Thangavelu	48,779	63.46%	+22.62
CPI	A. T. Karuppiah	26,109	33.97%	−22.86
Independent	P. Thiyagarajan	695	0.90%	New
Independent	P. Madasamy	544	0.71%	New
Independent	S. Vellasamy	489	0.64%	New
Margin of victory		22,670	29.49%	13.51%
Turnout		76,864	72.16%	1.19%
Registered electors		113,330		
INC gain from CPI		Swing	6.63%	

=== 1980 ===
1980 Tamil Nadu Legislative Assembly election: Valparai
Party	Candidate	Votes	%	±%
CPI	A. T. Karuppiah	46,406	56.83%	+30.3
INC	N. Kovaithangam	33,354	40.85%	New
Independent	M. Kuppuswami	1,670	2.05%	New
Margin of victory		13,052	15.98%	8.33%
Turnout		81,658	70.97%	13.20%
Registered electors		116,974		
CPI gain from AIADMK		Swing	22.65%	

=== 1977 ===
1977 Tamil Nadu Legislative Assembly election: Valparai
Party	Candidate	Votes	%	±%
AIADMK	R. S. Thangavelu	20,926	34.18%	New
CPI	A. T. Karuppiah	16,241	26.53%	New
DMK	D. M. Shanmugham	16,008	26.15%	−39.2
JP	M. Vellusamy	7,098	11.60%	New
Independent	S. Chelliah	401	0.66%	New
Margin of victory		4,685	7.65%	−32.87%
Turnout		61,215	57.77%	−6.39%
Registered electors		107,590		
AIADMK gain from DMK		Swing	-31.16%	

=== 1971 ===
1971 Tamil Nadu Legislative Assembly election: Valparai
Party	Candidate	Votes	%	±%
DMK	E. Ramaswamy	38,779	65.35%	−0.89
INC	M. Kuppuswamy	14,728	24.82%	−8.94
Independent	K. Makaliappan	4,733	7.98%	New
Independent	N. Raji	570	0.96%	New
Independent	G. Subramaniam	534	0.90%	New
Margin of victory		24,051	40.53%	8.05%
Turnout		59,344	64.16%	−5.86%
Registered electors		95,532		
DMK hold		Swing	-0.89%	

=== 1967 ===
1967 Madras Legislative Assembly election: Valparai
Party	Candidate	Votes	%	±%
DMK	E. Ramaswamy	40,945	66.24%	New
INC	N. Nachimuthu	20,868	33.76%	New
Margin of victory		20,077	32.48%	
Turnout		61,813	70.02%	
Registered electors		90,874		
DMK win (new seat)				

== Bibliography ==
- "Statistical reports of assembly elections". Election Commission of India. Archived from the original on October 5, 2010.
