= K. Shamugasundaram =

Member of the 17th Lok Sabha

K. Shanmugasundaram

Member of Parliament, Lok Sabha
- In office 23 May 2019 – 4 June 2024
- Preceded by: C. Mahendran
- Succeeded by: K. Eswarasamy
- Constituency: Pollachi, Tamil Nadu

Personal details
- Born: 1 June 1970 (age 55)
- Party: Dravida Munnetra Kazhagam

Kuppusamy Shanmugasundaram is an Indian politician. He was elected to the Lok Sabha, lower house of the Parliament of India from Pollachi, Tamil Nadu in the 2019 Indian general election as member of the Dravida Munnetra Kazhagam.

== Political career ==
=== Lok Sabha elections ===
Elections	Constituency	Party	Result	Vote percentage	Opposition Candidate	Opposition Party	Opposition vote percentage
2009 Indian general election	Pollachi	DMK	Lost	33.69	K. Sugumar	AIADMK	39.66
2019 Indian general election	Pollachi	DMK	Won	51.20	C. Mahendran	AIADMK	34.97
