= B. Raja Ravi Varma =

Indian politician

B. Raja Ravi Varma is an Indian politician and former Member of Parliament elected from Tamil Nadu. He was elected to the Lok Sabha from Pollachi constituency as an Anna Dravida Munnetra Kazhagam candidate in 1989 and 1991 election.
