= T. K. Amulkandasami =

Indian politician

Member of the Tamil Nadu Legislative Assembly
- In office 12 May 2021 – 21 June 2025
- Preceded by: V. Kasthuri Vasu
- Constituency: Valparai

Personal details
- Died: 21 June 2025 Coimbatore, Tamil Nadu, India
- Party: All India Anna Dravida Munnetra Kazhagam

T. K. Amulkandasami was an Indian politician who was a Member of Legislative Assembly of Tamil Nadu. He was elected from Valparai as an All India Anna Dravida Munnetra Kazhagam candidate in 2021. He died on 20 June 2025.

== Electoral performance ==
2021 Tamil Nadu Legislative Assembly election: Valparai
Party	Candidate	Votes	%	±%
AIADMK	T. K. Amulkandasami	71,672	49.34%	+0.66
CPI	M. Arumugham	59,449	40.93%	+38.5
NTK	C. Kohila	7,632	5.25%	+4.55
MNM	D. Senthilraj	3,314	2.28%	New
NOTA	NOTA	1,415	0.97%	−0.56
DMDK	M. S. Murugaraj	1,335	0.92%	New
Margin of victory		12,223	8.41%	2.68%
Turnout		145,259	70.69%	−2.35%
Rejected ballots		87	0.06%	
Registered electors		205,479		
AIADMK hold		Swing	0.66%	
