= A. T. Karuppiah =

Indian politician

- Occupation: politician
- Notable work: He is a former Member of the Legislative Assembly of Tamil Nadu

A. T. Karuppiah is an Indian politician and former Member of the Legislative Assembly of Tamil Nadu. He was elected to the Tamil Nadu legislative assembly as a Communist Party of India candidate from Valparai constituency in the 1980 election.
