= C. Krishnan (born 1936) =

Indian politician

Dr. C. Krishnan

Member of parliament
- Constituency: Pollachi

Personal details
- Born: 7 June 1936 (age 90) Coimbatore, Tamil Nadu
- Party: MDMK
- Spouse: S. Theymozhi
- Children: 2 sons
- As of 22 September, 2006

Dr. C. Krishnan (born 7 June 1936) is a member of the 14th Lok Sabha of India. He represents the Pollachi constituency of Tamil Nadu and is a member of the Marumalarchi Dravida Munnetra Kazhagam (MDMK) political party.
