= Madathukulam Assembly constituency =

One of the 234 State Legislative Assembly Constituencies in Tamil Nadu, in India

Coordinates: 10.5667°N 77.35°E

Madathukulam
- Constituency No. 126 for the Tamil Nadu Legislative Assembly

Constituency details
- Country: India
- Region: South India
- State: Tamil Nadu
- District: Tiruppur
- Lok Sabha constituency: Pollachi
- Established: 2008
- Total electors: 214,837
- Reservation: None

Member of Legislative Assembly
- 17th Tamil Nadu Legislative Assembly
- Incumbent R. Jayaramakrishnan
- Party: DMK
- Alliance: SPA
- Elected year: 2026

Madathukulam is a state assembly constituency in Tamil Nadu, India newly formed after constituency delimitations in 2008. Its State Assembly Constituency number is 126. It is included in Pollachi Lok Sabha constituency. It is one of the 234 State Legislative Assembly Constituencies in Tamil Nadu in India. It covers the area of Madathukulam block.

== Members of Legislative Assembly ==
Year	Winner	Party
2011	C. Shanmugavelu	All India Anna Dravida Munnetra Kazhagam
2016	R. Jayaramakrishnan	Dravida Munnetra Kazhagam
2021	C. Mahendran	All India Anna Dravida Munnetra Kazhagam
2026	R. Jayaramakrishnan	Dravida Munnetra Kazhagam

== Election results ==
Vote share of winning candidates
2026	37.43%
2021	46.35%
2016	44.66%
2011	54.71%

=== 2026 ===
2026 Tamil Nadu Legislative Assembly election: Madathukulam
Party	Candidate	Votes	%	±%
DMK	R. Jayaramakrishnan	70,458	37.43	▼5.38
AMMK	C. Shanmugavelu	54,490	28.95	▲25.37
TVK	R. Thirumalai	52,684	27.99	New
NTK	M Radhamani	6,578	3.49	▲0.06
NOTA	NOTA	911	0.48	▼0.10
Independent	K Vadivazhagan Balaji	664	0.35	New
PT	Ak Senthilkumar	621	0.33	New
Independent	Sp Mahendran	464	0.25	New
Independent	M Shanugavel	397	0.21	New
Independent	S Shanmugavel	301	0.16	New
Independent	P Thangaraj	263	0.14	New
Independent	M Ahamed Ali	206	0.11	New
Independent	A Shanmugavel	120	0.06	New
Independent	K Shanmugavel	92	0.05	New
Margin of victory		15,968	8.48	▲4.94
Turnout		1,88,249	87.62	▲14.42
Registered electors		2,14,837		▼33,664
DMK gain from AIADMK		Swing	▼5.38	

=== 2021 ===
2021 Tamil Nadu Legislative Assembly election: Madathukulam
Party	Candidate	Votes	%	±%
AIADMK	C. Mahendran	84,313	46.35%	2.66%
DMK	R. Jayaramakrishnan	77,875	42.81%	−1.86%
AMMK	C. Shanmugavelu	6,515	3.58%	
NTK	U Sanuja	6,245	3.43%	2.86%
MNM	K Kumaresan	2,894	1.59%	
NOTA	Nota	1,048	0.58%	−0.68%
Independent	G Ramakrishnan	712	0.39%	
Independent	K Mahendrakumar	611	0.34%	
Independent	K Manickasamy	503	0.28%	
BSP	J. Benjamin Kirubakaran	467	0.26%	−0.20%
Independent	P Mahendran	172	0.09%	
Margin of victory		6,438	3.54%	2.57%
Turnout		1,81,913	73.20%	−2.89%
Rejected ballots		11	0.01%	
Registered electors		2,48,501		
AIADMK gain from DMK		Swing	1.68%	

=== 2016 ===
2016 Tamil Nadu Legislative Assembly election: Madathukulam
Party	Candidate	Votes	%	±%
DMK	Jayaramakrishnan R	76,619	44.66%	3.64%
AIADMK	Manoharan K	74,952	43.69%	−11.02%
TMC(M)	Maheswari A S	6,208	3.62%	
BJP	Muthukumar A	2,619	1.53%	0.72%
PMK	Ravichandran A	2,443	1.42%	
NOTA	None Of The Above	2,147	1.25%	
KMDK	Kumaragurubaran	1,573	0.92%	
Independent	Manoharan S	1,450	0.85%	
NTK	Ravishankar C	980	0.57%	
BSP	Alavudeen S	783	0.46%	0.04%
Independent	Veeramanickam S	569	0.33%	
Margin of victory		1,667	0.97%	−12.72%
Turnout		1,71,544	76.09%	−5.40%
Registered electors		2,25,451		
DMK gain from AIADMK		Swing	-10.05%	

=== 2011 ===
2011 Tamil Nadu Legislative Assembly election: Madathukulam
Party	Candidate	Votes	%	±%
AIADMK	C. Shanmugavelu	78,622	54.71%	
DMK	M. P. Saminathan	58,953	41.02%	
Independent	D. Varadharajan	1,742	1.21%	
BJP	R. Vijayaragavan	1,166	0.81%	
Independent	P. Nandakumar	946	0.66%	
Independent	S. Sadayappan	739	0.51%	
BSP	S. Radhakrishnan	598	0.42%	
Independent	N. Thangavel	289	0.20%	
Independent	P. Subramaniam	289	0.20%	
Independent	T. Saminathan	218	0.15%	
Independent	M. Kandhasamy	141	0.10%	
Margin of victory		19,669	13.69%	{{{change}}}
Turnout		1,76,351	81.49%	
Registered electors		1,43,703		
AIADMK win (new seat)				
