= V. P. Singaravelu =

Indian politician

- Born: 3 June 1959
- Died: 7 December 2011 (aged 52)
- Occupation: politician

V. P. Singaravelu (3 June 1959 – 7 December 2011) was an Indian politician. He was elected to the Tamil Nadu Legislative Assembly from the Valparai constituency in the 1996 elections as a candidate of the Dravida Munnetra Kazhagam (DMK) party.

Singaravelu joined the DMK in his college days at Madurai Law College. He quit the party to join Vaiko's Marumalarchi Dravida Munnetra Kazhagam, where he remained a member for some time before being convinced by then DMK Coimbatore district secretary, Pongalur Palanisamy, to rejoin the DMK before the 1996 Tamil Nadu assembly polls. Palanisamy considered him to be a charismatic leader with strong backing from the dalit community in Valparai.

Singaravelu won the Valparai constituency in the 1996 elections as a DMK candidate. The constituency was reserved for candidates from the Scheduled Castes. Electoral pacts for the 2001 election saw the DMK to prefer that the Puthiya Tamizhagam party contest it rather than Singaravelu.

Singaravelu acted as the legal advisor of a plantation workers union and championed fair wages and amenities for the workers.

He died on 7 December 2011 and was survived by his wife, two daughters and a son.
