= Moongiltholuvu =

- Village
- Location in Tamil Nadu, India Moongiltholuvu (India)
- Coordinates: 10.76400°N 77.21294°E
- Country: India
- State: Tamil Nadu
- District: Tirupur

Population (2005)
  - Total: 3,030

Languages
  - Official: Tamil
- Time zone: UTC+5:30 (IST)
- PIN: 642 202
- Telephone code: 011 91 4252

Moongiltholuvu is a village and Village Panchayat (Includes Mannampalayam and Sikkanoothu and few other small settlements as part of its territory) in Udumalpet Taluk, Tirupur District (Formerly in Coimbatore District), Tamil Nadu, India.

Moongiltholuvu gets its name from once abundant presence of bamboo in this area, though at present there is rare places we can find bamboo in this village.

== Demographics ==
The total population of Moongiltholuvu is 3,030 (Male - 1,520 Female -1,510).

== Schools ==
Moongiltholuvu has Panchayat Union Middle School.

Link to Tamil Nadu government details on the school: School Link to Tamilnadu government

== Occupation ==
The main occupation is agriculture. The sources of irrigation are wells, bore wells and canal water from Thirumoorthy hills - (Thirumoorthy Dam). There are few small ponds, water sources to them are not properly maintained and are mostly dry. Due to scarce rainfall and improper water management, the water table is too deep and posing a great challenge.

One of the ponds in Moongiltholuvu village

== Temples ==
There are number of Ganesh temples including one Sakthi Vinayagar temple, one Mariyamman temple, one Kariyakaliamman temple, one Perumal temple, one Ramar temple and several others.

== Shopping ==
There are number of general provision shops, many tea shops, one bakery and there are two fertilizer shops. At times whole sale vegetable markets will be set up to procure local produce. There is a Tamil Nadu government run civil supplies shop in Moongiltholuvu.

== Nearby tourist attractions ==
Moongiltholuvu is located 45.4 km from Amaravathinagar and 43.4 km from Thirumoorthy hills - both of which are regional tourist destinations.

Ooty - 130 km Kodaikanal 122 km and Valparai - 99.4 km are the nearby hill stations.

Palani - 59.6 km is the important religious place near Moongiltholuvu.

== Transportation ==
Moongiltholuvu is about 21 km from Udumalaipettai on the Highway from Palani to Coimbatore.

Reach Udumalaipettai from Coimbatore or Palani and from Udumalaipettai - Local buses (Bus no:4, 4A and 34 (Three trips 7:15 am, 1:15 pm, 7:15 pm)) fly here.

There are buses available from Coimbatore and Palladam as well.

Coimbatore has an international airport -Coimbatore International Airport. Flights connect it to Chennai and other important cities. Coimbatore is connected by rail to Chennai, Trivandrum, Delhi and other cities. It is also connected to all the important cities and places of interest by road.

== Postal ==
Pincode - 642 202

== Telephone ==
BSNL Longdistance code - 04252

BSNL, Airtel, Reliance Jio cell phones also work well in this area.

== Political ==
Moongiltholuvu is in 125.Udumalaipettai assembly constituency of Tamil Nadu and Pollachi MP constituency.
