= C. Rajendran =

Indian politician

Chitlapakkam C. Rajendran is an Indian politician and former member of the Parliament of India from Chennai South Constituency. He represents the All India Anna Dravida Munnetra Kazhagam party. Rajendran was also the AIADMK candidate in the 2016 and 2026 assembly elections from Tambaram
