= K. Sugumar =

Indian politician

K. Sugumar is an Indian politician and was a member of the Parliament of India from Pollachi Constituency. He represents the All India Anna Dravida Munnetra Kazhagam party.
