= Pollachi Lok Sabha constituency =

Parliamentary constituency in Tamil Nadu, India

Coordinates: 10.659°N 77.008°E

Pollachi
- Lok Sabha constituency
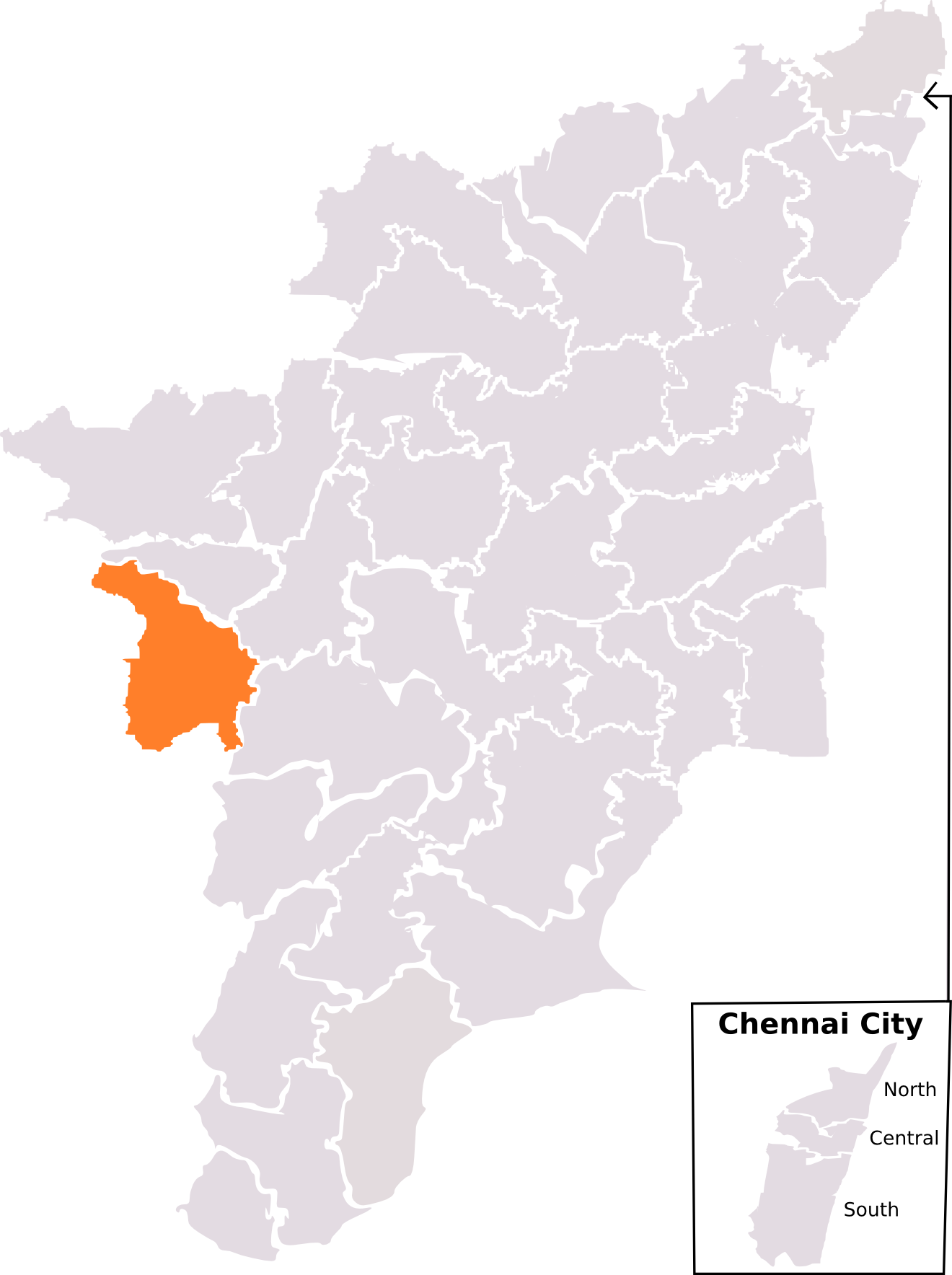
- Pollachi constituency, post-2008 delimitation

Constituency details
- Country: India
- Region: South India
- State: Tamil Nadu
- Assembly constituencies: Thondamuthur; Kinathukadavu; Pollachi; Valparai; Udumalaipettai; Madathukulam
- Established: 1952
- Total electors: 15,20,276
- Reservation: None

Member of Parliament
- 18th Lok Sabha
- Incumbent K. Eswarasamy
- Party: DMK
- Alliance: None
- Elected year: 2024

Pollachi is a Lok Sabha (Parliament of India) constituency in Tamil Nadu. Its Tamil Nadu Parliamentary Constituency number is 21 of 39.

== Assembly segments ==
=== 2009-present ===
Constituency number	Name	Reserved for (SC/ST/None)	District	Party	2024 Lead
119	Thondamuthur	None	Coimbatore	AIADMK	DMK
122	Kinathukadavu	None	Coimbatore	TVK	DMK
123	Pollachi	None	Coimbatore	DMK	DMK
124	Valparai	SC	Coimbatore	DMK	DMK
125	Udumalaipettai	None	Tiruppur	DMK	DMK
126	Madathukulam	None	Tiruppur	DMK	DMK

Before delimitation in 2009, it consisted of the following constituencies:

1. Coimbatore West (defunct)
2. Coimbatore East (defunct)
3. Perur (defunct)
4. Singanallur
5. Palladam
6. Tiruppur (defunct)

=== Before 2009 ===
1. Kinathukkadavu
2. Pollachi
3. Valparai (SC)
4. Udumalpet
5. Pongalur (defunct)
6. Dharapuram (moved to Erode constituency after 2009)

== Members of Parliament ==
Year	Winner	Party	Runner-up	Party
1951	G. R. Damodaran	Indian National Congress	Krisnabai Nimbkar Vasudev	SP
1957	P. R. Ramakrishnan	Indian National Congress	Gurusami Aicker	PSP
1962	Chidambaram Subramaniam	Indian National Congress	R. M. Ramasamy	SWA
1967	Narayanan	Dravida Munnetra Kazhagam	SK Paramasivam	INC
1971	Narayanan	Dravida Munnetra Kazhagam	Nallasivam	SSP
1971 (by-election)	M. Kalingarayar	Dravida Munnetra Kazhagam	RK Gounder	Independent
1977	K. A. Raju	All India Anna Dravida Munnetra Kazhagam	C.T. Dhandapani	DMK
1980	C.T. Dhandapani	Dravida Munnetra Kazhagam	Natarajan M.A.M	AIDMK
1984	R. Anna Nambi	All India Anna Dravida Munnetra Kazhagam	K. Krishnasamy	DMK
1989	B. Raja Ravi Varma	All India Anna Dravida Munnetra Kazhagam	M. Arumugham	CPI
1991	B. Raja Ravi Varma	All India Anna Dravida Munnetra Kazhagam	C.T. Dhandapani	DMK
1996	V. Kandasamy	Tamil Maanila Congress	R. Anna Nambi	AIADMK
1998	M. Thiyagarajan	All India Anna Dravida Munnetra Kazhagam	N. Kovaithangam	TMC(M)
1999	C. Krishnan	Marumalarchi Dravida Munnetra Kazhagam	M. Thiyagarajan	AIADMK
2004	C. Krishnan	Marumalarchi Dravida Munnetra Kazhagam	G. Murugan	AIADMK
2009	K. Sugumar	All India Anna Dravida Munnetra Kazhagam	K. Shamugasundaram	DMK
2014	C. Mahendran	All India Anna Dravida Munnetra Kazhagam	E. R. Eswaran	KMDK
2019	K. Shamugasundaram	Dravida Munnetra Kazhagam	C. Mahendran	AIADMK
2024	Eswarasamy	Dravida Munnetra Kazhagam	A. Karthikeyan	AIADMK

== Election results ==
Vote share of Winning candidates
2024	47.37%
2019	51.44%
2014	41.72%
2009	39.77%
2004	56.76%
1999	48.63%
1998	55.22%
1996	55.18%
1991	65.65%
1989	67.28%
1984	59.27%
1980	51.41%
1977	64.48%
1971	64.66%
1967	58.56%
1962	56.40%
1957	53.10%
1951	44.40%

=== General Elections 2024 ===
2024 Indian general election: Pollachi
Party	Candidate	Votes	%	±%
DMK	K. Eswarasamy	533,377	47.37	▼4.07
AIADMK	A. Karthikeyan	281,335	24.98	▼10.14
BJP	K. Vasantharajan	223,354	19.84	▲17.65
NOTA	None of the above	14,503	1.29	▼0.11
Margin of victory		252,042	22.38	▲6.06
Turnout		1,126,045		
Registered electors				
DMK hold		Swing		

=== General Elections 2019 ===
2019 Indian general election: Pollachi
Party	Candidate	Votes	%	±%
DMK	K. Shamugasundaram	554,230	51.44	26.25
AIADMK	C. Mahendran	3,78,347	35.12	−6.60
MNM	R. Mookambika	59,693	5.54	
Independent	S. Muthukumar	26,663	2.47	
NOTA	None of the above	15,110	1.40	0.11
Margin of victory		1,75,883	16.32	2.22
Turnout		10,77,420	71.15	−1.51
Registered electors		15,20,504		10.06
DMK gain from AIADMK		Swing	9.72	

=== General Elections 2014 ===
2014 Indian general election: Pollachi
Party	Candidate	Votes	%	±%
AIADMK	C. Mahendran	417,092	41.72	1.95
KMDK	E. R. Eswaran	2,76,118	27.62	25.43
DMK	Pongalur N. Palanisamy	2,51,829	25.19	−8.60
INC	Selvaraj	30,014	3.00	
NOTA	None of the above	12,947	1.30	
Independent	M. Mary Stella	4,942	0.49	
Margin of victory		1,40,974	14.10	8.12
Turnout		9,99,720	73.31	−3.22
Registered electors		13,81,505		35.73
AIADMK hold		Swing	1.95	

=== General Elections 2009 ===
2009 Indian general election: Pollachi
Party	Candidate	Votes	%	±%
AIADMK	K. Sugumar	305,935	39.77	1.81
DMK	K. Shamugasundaram	2,59,910	33.79	
KNMK	Best S. Ramasamy	1,03,004	13.39	
DMDK	K. P. Thangavel	38,824	5.05	
BJP	V. S. Baba Ramesh	16,815	2.19	
MNMK	E. Ummar	13,933	1.81	
Independent	P. Sukumar	5,660	0.74	
Margin of victory		46,025	5.98	−12.82
Turnout		7,69,303	75.80	13.71
Registered electors		10,17,811		−2.07
AIADMK gain from MDMK		Swing	-17.00	

=== General Elections 2004 ===
2004 Indian general election: Pollachi
Party	Candidate	Votes	%	±%
MDMK	C. Krishnan	364,988	56.76	8.14
AIADMK	G. Murugan	2,44,067	37.96	−9.09
Independent	R. Rajkumar	13,039	2.03	
Independent	K. M. Ganesan	6,503	1.01	
Independent	A. Krishnan	5,452	0.85	
BSP	N. Muthukumar	5,294	0.82	
Independent	K. Devaraj	3,656	0.57	
Margin of victory		1,20,921	18.81	17.23
Turnout		6,42,999	61.88	4.78
Registered electors		10,39,279		−3.25
MDMK hold		Swing	8.14	

=== General Elections 1999 ===
1999 Indian general election: Pollachi
Party	Candidate	Votes	%	±%
MDMK	C. Krishnan	293,038	48.63	
AIADMK	M. Thiyagarajan	2,83,523	47.05	13.05
JD(S)	K. N. Rajan	9,914	1.65	
PT	M. Jothiraj	9,280	1.54	
Independent	P. Ganesan	6,886	1.14	
Margin of victory		9,515	1.58	−15.63
Turnout		6,02,641	57.09	−14.80
Registered electors		10,74,230		4.70
MDMK gain from AIADMK		Swing	-6.55	

=== General Elections 1998 ===
1998 Indian general election: Pollachi
Party	Candidate	Votes	%	±%
AIADMK	M. Thiyagarajan	306,083	55.22	
TMC(M)	N. Kovaithangam	2,10,682	38.01	
INC	R. Eswaravelu	31,967	5.77	
PT	M. Jothiraj	4,926	0.89	
Margin of victory		95,401	17.21	−3.97
Turnout		5,54,275	56.42	−15.47
Registered electors		10,26,056		5.92
AIADMK gain from TMC(M)		Swing	0.04	

=== General Elections 1996 ===
1996 Indian general election: Pollachi
Party	Candidate	Votes	%	±%
TMC(M)	V. Kandasamy	361,743	55.18	
AIADMK	R. Anna Nambi	2,22,852	33.99	−31.65
JD	K. N. Rajan	49,032	7.48	
BJP	E. K. Elangandhi	15,123	2.31	
Margin of victory		1,38,891	21.19	−11.46
Turnout		6,55,567	71.89	4.43
Registered electors		9,68,739		0.53
TMC(M) gain from AIADMK		Swing	-10.47	

=== General Elections 1991 ===
1991 Indian general election: Pollachi
Party	Candidate	Votes	%	±%
AIADMK	B. Raja Ravi Varma	414,810	65.65	−1.63
DMK	C. T. Dhandapani	2,08,540	33.00	
PMK	G. Selvaraj	5,237	0.83	
Margin of victory		2,06,270	32.64	−3.66
Turnout		6,31,864	67.46	0.42
Registered electors		9,63,590		−0.28
AIADMK hold		Swing	-1.63	

=== General Elections 1989 ===
1989 Indian general election: Pollachi
Party	Candidate	Votes	%	±%
AIADMK	B. Raja Ravi Varma	428,704	67.28	8.01
CPI	M. Aurmugham	1,97,395	30.98	
THMM	C. Sankar	5,800	0.91	
PMK	T. Subramaniam	3,532	0.55	
Margin of victory		2,31,309	36.30	17.76
Turnout		6,37,210	67.04	−7.33
Registered electors		9,66,256		25.74
AIADMK hold		Swing	8.01	

=== General Elections 1984 ===
1984 Indian general election: Pollachi
Party	Candidate	Votes	%	±%
AIADMK	R. Anna Nambi	324,200	59.27	11.33
DMK	K. Krishnaswamy	2,22,770	40.73	−10.68
Margin of victory		1,01,430	18.54	15.08
Turnout		5,46,970	74.37	8.60
Registered electors		7,68,435		8.88
AIADMK gain from DMK		Swing	7.86	

=== General Elections 1980 ===
1980 Indian general election: Pollachi
Party	Candidate	Votes	%	±%
DMK	C. T. Dhandapani	233,261	51.41	17.80
AIADMK	M. A. M. Natarajan	2,17,526	47.94	−16.54
Independent	K. Nagarajan	2,934	0.65	
Margin of victory		15,735	3.47	−27.41
Turnout		4,53,721	65.77	4.06
Registered electors		7,05,793		5.27
DMK gain from AIADMK		Swing	-13.07	

=== General Elections 1977 ===
1977 Indian general election: Pollachi
Party	Candidate	Votes	%	±%
AIADMK	K. A. Raju	259,388	64.48	
DMK	C. T. Dhandapani	1,35,194	33.61	−31.05
Independent	V. Murugan	7,664	1.91	
Margin of victory		1,24,194	30.88	0.41
Turnout		4,02,246	61.71	−9.69
Registered electors		6,70,445		10.97
AIADMK gain from DMK		Swing	-0.17	

=== General Elections 1971 ===
1971 Indian general election: Pollachi
Party	Candidate	Votes	%	±%
DMK	Narayanan	267,811	64.66	6.09
SSP	K. R. Nallasivam	1,41,605	34.19	
Independent	K. N. Lingasami Gounder	4,799	1.16	
Margin of victory		1,26,206	30.47	10.27
Turnout		4,14,215	71.40	−5.30
Registered electors		6,04,191		9.95
DMK hold		Swing	6.09	

=== General Elections 1967 ===
1967 Indian general election: Pollachi
Party	Candidate	Votes	%	±%
DMK	Narayanan	237,035	58.56	
INC	S. K. Paramasivam	1,55,281	38.36	−18.03
Independent	N. L. Gounder	12,437	3.07	
Margin of victory		81,754	20.20	−11.78
Turnout		4,04,753	76.70	3.99
Registered electors		5,49,500		22.45
DMK gain from INC		Swing	2.17	

=== General Elections 1962 ===
1962 Indian general election: Pollachi
Party	Candidate	Votes	%	±%
INC	Chidambaram Subramaniam	176,512	56.40	3.29
SWA	R. M. Ramasami	76,415	24.41	
Independent	Thangavel Gounder	46,922	14.99	
Independent	Ramanujam	13,142	4.20	
Margin of victory		1,00,097	31.98	25.77
Turnout		3,12,991	72.71	13.14
Registered electors		4,48,744		1.42
INC hold		Swing	3.29	

=== General Elections 1957 ===
1957 Indian general election: Pollachi
Party	Candidate	Votes	%	±%
INC	P. R. Ramakrishnan	139,984	53.10	8.70
PSP	Gurusami Aicker	1,23,618	46.90	
Margin of victory		16,366	6.21	−15.97
Turnout		2,63,602	59.58	2.46
Registered electors		4,42,467		20.13
INC hold		Swing	8.70	

=== General Elections 1951 ===
1951–52 Indian general election: Pollachi
Party	Candidate	Votes	%	±%
INC	G. R. Damodaran	93,405	44.40	44.40
SP	Krisnabai Nimbkar Vasudev	46,744	22.22	
CPI	Ramaswami	44,383	21.10	
Independent	Paranjothi Ganpathi Swami	20,699	9.84	
Independent	Ramalinga Chetty	5,128	2.44	
Margin of victory		46,661	22.18	
Turnout		2,10,359	57.11	
Registered electors		3,68,310		0.00
INC win (new seat)				

== See also ==
- List of constituencies of the Lok Sabha
