= Virudhachalam =

Vriddhachalam Thirumudhukundram, Pazhamalai
- Municipality
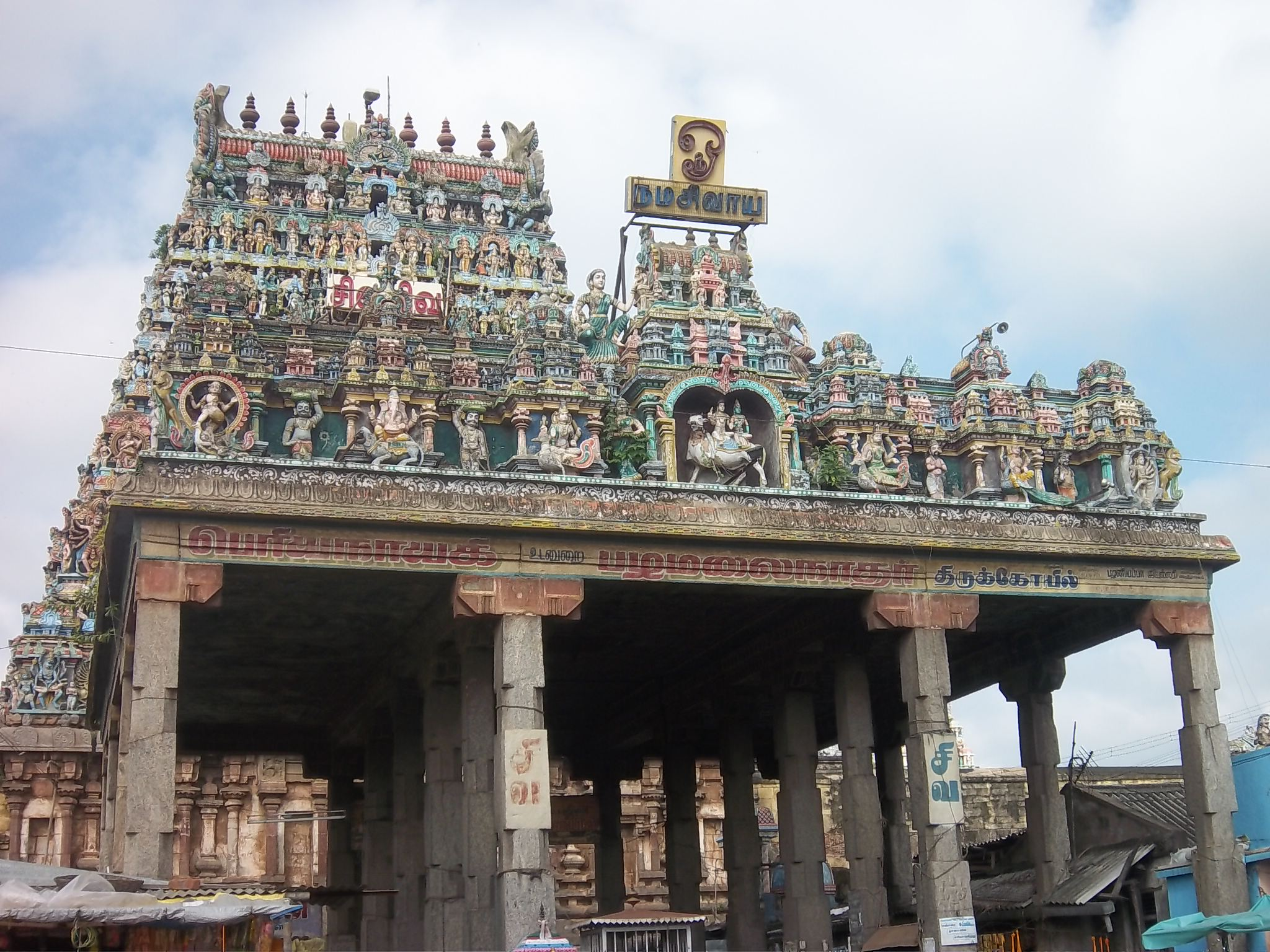
- Nicknames: Virudhai, Ceramic City
- Location in Tamil Nadu, India
- Coordinates: 11.50°N 79.33°E
- Country: India
- State: Tamil Nadu
- District: Cuddalore

Government
  - Type: First Grade Municipality
  - MLA: Premalatha Vijayakanth
- Elevation: 45 m (148 ft)

Population (2011)
  - Total: 73,585

Languages
  - Official: Tamil
- Time zone: UTC+5:30 (IST)
- Postal code: 606 001
- Vehicle registration: TN-91( TN-31 till Jun17,2015)

Virudhachalam, also called Vriddhachalam, is a Municipality and taluk headquarters in Cuddalore district in the Indian state of Tamil Nadu. The ancient name of this town is Thirumudhukundram. As per the 2011 census, the town had a population of 73,585 of which 37,066 are males while 36,519 are females. Population of children in the ages of 0-6 is 7735 which is 10.51% of the total population. The Virudhagiriswarar temple (or Pazhamalai Nadhar Temple) dedicated to Lord Shiva is located in the heart of town.

Virudhachalam Railway junction is one of the most important railway junctions which connects Chennai - Madurai line to Salem, Cuddalore, and Puducherry.

Vriddhachalam is famous for its ceramic industry. The industry with an industrial estate that only consists of ceramic and refractory manufactures is exclusive in Virudhachalam. The ceramic industrial estate is situated only at Virudhachalam in the whole of Tamil Nadu. A polytechnic college, especially for ceramic technology, is also only located in Virudhachalam for the entire Tamil Nadu. A unique research center for the research of cashew and byproducts is situated in Virudhachalam.

== Geography ==
Virudhachalam is located at 11.50°N 79.33°E. It has an average elevation of 45 m (148 ft).

== Demographics ==
Religious census
Religion	Percent(%)
Hindu	85.72%
Muslim	10.78%
Christian	3.23%
Jain	0.07%
Sikh	0.06%
Buddhist	0.01%
Other	0.13%
No religion	0.01%

According to the 2011 census, Virudhachalam had a population of 73,585 with a sex ratio of 985 females for every 1,000 males, much above the national average of 929. A total of 7,735 were under the age of six, constituting 4,041 males and 3,694 females. Scheduled Castes and Scheduled Tribes accounted for 16.76% and .44% of the population, respectively. The average literacy of the town was 77.57%, compared to the national average of 72.99%. The town had a total of 18209 households. There were a total of 26,153 workers, comprising 609 cultivators, 2,257 primary agricultural labourers, 644 in household industries, 18,988 other workers, 3,655 marginal workers, 77 marginal cultivators, 409 marginal agricultural labourers, 245 marginal workers in household industries, and 2,924 other marginal workers. As per the religious census of 2011, Virudhachalam had 85.72% Hindus, 10.78% Muslims, 3.23% Christians, 0.06% Sikhs, 0.01% Buddhists, 0.07% Jains, 0.13% following other religions, and 0.01% following no religion or did not indicate any religious preference.

There are several temples, Mosques and churches in this city.

== Politics ==
MLA of Virudhachalam assembly constituency is M.R.R.Radhakrishnan. During the 2009 general elections, Virudhachalam was a part of Cuddalore (Lok Sabha constituency) with six assembly segments. Tittakudi (SC), Vridhachalam, Neyveli, Cuddalore, Panruti, and Kurinjipadi. Before 2009, the Cuddalore Lok Sabha constituency was composed of the following assembly segments: Ulundurpet (SC), Nellikkuppam, Cuddalore, Panruti, Rishivandinam, and Sankarapuram. The Lok Sabha seat has been held by the Indian National Congress for eight terms during 1951–56, 1971–77, 1977–80. 1980–84, 1984–1989, 1989–91, 1991–96, and 2009–2014, Dravida Munnetra Kazhagam for four times during 1962–1967, 1967–71, 1999-04, and 2004–09, Anna Dravida Munnetra Kazhagam once during 1998–99, 2014-present, Tamil Maanila Congress once during 1996-2001 and an independent during 1957–62, The current Member of Parliament from the constituency is T.R.V.S.Ramesh from DMK. Virudhachalam Constituency is where Vijaykanth, the leader of DMDK, became MLA for the first time. G. Bhuvaraghan of INC was MLC of Virudhachalam at the period of 1962 to 1971 who have developed town with the current advantages like bridges, government schools for boys and girls, government arts college, Government Printing Press Etc., Virudhachalam is a first-grade municipality with 34 municipal wards and 34 municipal councilors. The current chairman of the municipality is Dr.Sangavi Murugadoss who was elected in the by-election after Mr. Ranganathan, municipal chairman, and Ex MLA, Virudhachalam.

== See also ==
- New Viruthakirikuppam
