= Saba Rajendran =

Indian politician

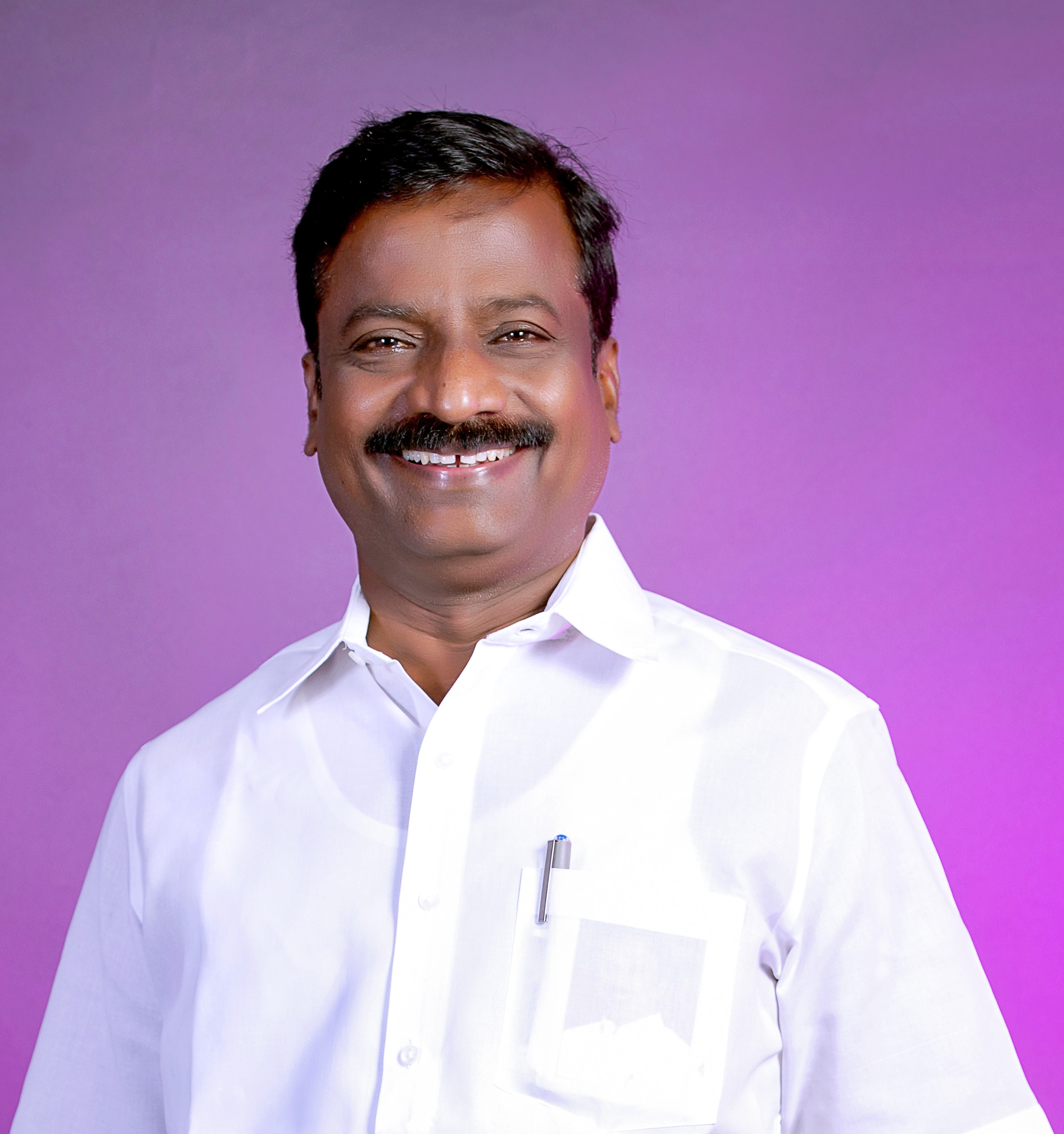
- Saba Rajendran

Member of Tamil Nadu Legislative Assembly
- In office 19 May 2016 – 6 May 2026
- Preceded by: M. P. S. Sivasubramaniyan
- Succeeded by: Sorathur R. Rajendran
- Constituency: Neyveli
- In office 11 May 2006 – 13 May 2011
- Succeeded by: M. C. Sampath
- Constituency: Nellikkuppam

Personal details
- Born: 18 June 1961 (age 65) Cuddalore, Tamil Nadu India
- Party: Dravida Munnetra Kazhagam
- Spouse: R. Angayarkanni
- Children: R. Sumanth
- Parent: C. Sabapathy (father)
- Relatives: Saba Balamurugan (Younger Brother)
- Education: Annamalai University; J. M. I. T College
- Profession: Agriculture

Saba Rajendran (born 18 June 1961) is an Indian politician and an incumbent Member of legislative assembly of Neyveli, Tamil Nadu.

He was born in Sorathur. He holds a B.Sc. in Mathematics and a B.E. in mechanical engineering.

He was elected to the Tamil Nadu legislative assembly as a Dravida Munnetra Kazhagam candidate from Neyveli constituency in the 2016 elections. Previously he was elected to the Tamil Nadu legislative assembly as a Dravida Munnetra Kazhagam candidate from Nellikuppam constituency in the 2006 election. He again won the election in 2021 in Neyveli constituency.

== Early life and education ==
Saba Rajendran, was born and brought up in Sorathur village, Cuddalore, Tamilnadu.

== Political career ==
In the 2006 Tamil Nadu Legislative Assembly election, Saba Rajendran contested the Nellikuppam constituency and won the election.

In the 2011 Tamil Nadu Legislative Assembly election, he represented DMK and lost the election to a Desiya Murpokku Dravida Kazhagam candidate by a vote share difference of 6%.

Subsequently, in the 2016 and 2021 Tamil Nadu Legislative Assembly election, he won in the Neyveli constituency.

== Electoral performance ==
=== Tamil Nadu Legislative elections ===
Elections	Constituency	Party	Result	Vote Percentage
2006 Tamil Nadu Legislative Assembly election	Nellikkuppam	DMK	Won	46.16%
2011 Tamil Nadu Legislative Assembly election	Panruti	DMK	Lost	44.27%
2016 Tamil Nadu Legislative Assembly election	Neyveli	DMK	Won	34.10%
2021 Tamil Nadu Legislative Assembly election	Neyveli	DMK	Won	45.80%

=== Detailed performance ===
2021 Tamil Nadu Legislative Assembly election: Neyveli
Party	Candidate	Votes	%	±%
DMK	Saba Rajendran	75,177	45.80%	+11.7
PMK	K. Jagan	74,200	45.21%	+32.81
NTK	K. Ramesh	7,785	4.74%	+3.77
AMMK	R. Baktharatchagan	2,230	1.36%	New
NOTA	NOTA	1,171	0.71%	−0.36
IJK	R. Ilangovan	1,011	0.62%	New
Margin of victory		977	0.60%	−10.58%
Turnout		164,130	75.08%	−4.13%
Rejected ballots		328	0.20%	
Registered electors		218,603		
DMK hold		Swing	11.70%	

2016 Tamil Nadu Legislative Assembly election: Neyveli
Party	Candidate	Votes	%	±%
DMK	Saba Rajendran	54,299	34.10%	New
AIADMK	R. Rajsekar	36,508	22.93%	−27.71
TVMK	T. Velmurugan	30,528	19.17%	New
PMK	K. Jagan	19,749	12.40%	−32.32
CPI(M)	T. Arumugman	12,674	7.96%	New
NOTA	NOTA	1,710	1.07%	New
NTK	B. Kalaiselvan	1,557	0.98%	New
Margin of victory		17,791	11.17%	5.26%
Turnout		159,241	79.21%	−3.49%
Registered electors		201,040		
DMK gain from AIADMK		Swing	-16.54%	

2011 Tamil Nadu Legislative Assembly election: Panruti
Party	Candidate	Votes	%	±%
DMDK	P. Sivakozhundu	82,187	50.91	+29.86
DMK	Saba Rajendran	71,471	44.27	New
IJK	R. Sankar	1,570	0.97	New
Puratchi Bharatham	M. Deiveegadas	1,155	0.72	New
BJP	R. M. Selvakumar	1,064	0.66	New
Independent	N. S. Velmurugan	943	0.58	New
BSP	K. K. Iyappan	859	0.53	New
Margin of victory		10,716	6.64	6.53
Turnout		161,443	83.25	1.59
Registered electors		193,924		
DMDK gain from PMK		Swing	12.73	

2006 Tamil Nadu Legislative Assembly election: Nellikkuppam
Party	Candidate	Votes	%	±%
DMK	Saba Rajendran	57,403	46.16%	+1.9
MDMK	R. T. Sabapathi Mohan	45,323	36.44%	+33.99
DMDK	P. Sivakolunthu	15,853	12.75%	New
BJP	J. Sugumaran	1,160	0.93%	New
Independent	M. Saravanan	1,043	0.84%	New
BSP	K. Iyappan	947	0.76%	New
Independent	P. Sarangapani	924	0.74%	New
CPI(ML)L	N. Kaliyamoorthy	889	0.71%	New
Margin of victory		12,080	9.71%	3.04%
Turnout		124,365	75.66%	6.71%
Registered electors		164,369		
DMK gain from AIADMK		Swing	-4.78%	

district.
