= B. Valarmathi =

Indian politician

B.Valarmathi

Chairman- Tamil Nadu Textbook Corporation
- In office 8 Jan 2017 – 2 May 2021
- Preceded by: K. Pandiarajan
- Succeeded by: Dindigul I. Leoni

Cabinet Minister Government of Tamil Nadu
- In office 12 December 2011 – 22 May 2016
- Minister: Minister of Social Welfare and Nutritious Noon meal program
- Chief Minister: J. Jayalalithaa; O. Panneerselvam; J. Jayalalithaa
- Preceded by: Selvi Ramajayam
- Succeeded by: V. Saroja
- In office 27 August 2004 – 12 May 2006
- Minister: Minister of Rural Industries
- Chief Minister: J. Jayalalithaa
- Preceded by: K. Pandurangan
- Succeeded by: Pongalur N. Palanisamy
- In office 14 May 2001 – 27 August 2004
- Minister: Minister of Social Welfare and Nutritious Noon meal program
- Chief Minister: J. Jayalalithaa; O. Panneerselvam; J. Jayalalithaa
- Preceded by: S. P. Sarguna Pandian
- Succeeded by: Vijayalakshmi Palanisamy

Member of the Tamil Nadu Legislative Assembly
- In office 23 May 2011 – 21 May 2016
- Preceded by: M. K. Stalin
- Succeeded by: K. K. Selvam
- Constituency: Thousand Lights
- In office 13 May 2001 – 11 May 2006
- Preceded by: C. Shanmugam
- Succeeded by: T. M. Anbarasan
- Constituency: Alandur
- In office 1984–1989
- Preceded by: T. K. Kapali
- Succeeded by: N. Ganapathy
- Constituency: Mylapore

State Secretary of the AIADMK Women's Wing
- Incumbent
- Assumed office 23 July 2021
- General Secretary: Edappadi K. Palaniswami
- Joint Secretary: Margatham Kumaravel; Keerthika Muniyasamy
- Deputy: V. M. Rajalakshmi; Gayathri Raguram
- Preceded by: Vijila Sathyananth
- In office 1 January 2007 – 28 January 2010
- General Secretary: J. Jayalalithaa
- Preceded by: S. Gokula Indira
- Succeeded by: S. Gokula Indira

Personal details
- Born: 20 October 1957 (age 69) Madurai, Madras, India (present-day Tamil Nadu, India)
- Party: All India Anna Dravida Munnetra Kazhagam
- Spouse: Balasubramanian (m. 1977)
- Children: 2
- Education: B.A.

Balasubramanian Valarmathi is an Indian politician and was a member of the 14th Tamil Nadu Legislative Assembly from Thousand Lights constituency. As a member of All India Anna Dravida Munnetra Kazhagam, she was elected from Mylapore in 1984, Alandur constituency in the 2001 and Thousand Lights in 2011 elections. She is currently serving as the Women's Wing Secretary of AIADMK. She also served as Minister in Jayalalithaa cabinet on two occasions. Minister of Rural Industries (2004-2006) and Social welfare (2001-2004, 2011-2016).

The elections of 2016 resulted in her constituency being won by Ku. Ka. Selvam. She was one among the 13 incumbent ADMK ministers defeated in 2016 Tamil Nadu assembly election.

After Jayalalitha's death, she briefly aligned with Sasikala faction before returning to ADMK camp in 2018.

She was appointed as the Chairman of Tamil Nadu Textbook Association from 2017 to 2021, a position which had equivalent rank as Cabinet Minister.

She was one among the few leading female leaders of ADMK.

== Elections contested ==
Election	Constituency	Party	Result	Vote %	Winner/Runner-up	Winner/Runner-up Party	Winner/Runner-up vote %	Ref.
2021 Tamil Nadu Legislative Assembly election	Alandur	AIADMK	Lost	32.06%	T. M. Anbarasan	DMK	49.12%	
2016 Tamil Nadu Legislative Assembly election	Thousand Lights	AIADMK	Lost	38.78%	Ku. Ka. Selvam	DMK	48.56%	
2011 Tamil Nadu Legislative Assembly election	Thousand Lights	AIADMK	Won	50.55%	Hasan Mohamed Jinnah	DMK	44.87%	
2006 Tamil Nadu Legislative Assembly election	Alandur	AIADMK	Lost	40.55%	T. M. Anbarasan	DMK	46.85%	
2001 Tamil Nadu Legislative Assembly election	Alandur	AIADMK	Won	47.59%	R. M. Veerappan	MGRK	41.25%	
1984 Tamil Nadu Legislative Assembly election	Mylapore	AIADMK	Won	51.68%	R. S. Bharathi	DMK	46.22%	
