= V. N. P. Venkatraman =

Indian politician

V. N. P. Venkatraman is an Indian politician and was a member of the 14th Tamil Nadu Legislative Assembly from the Alandur constituency. He represented the All India Anna Dravida Munnetra Kazhagam party after defeating Panruti S. Ramachandran in a by-election in 2014. Ramachandran had resigned the seat in December 2013 at the same time that he resigned from the Desiya Murpokku Dravida Kazhagam.

The elections of 2016 resulted in his constituency being won by T. M. Anbarasan.

In September 2016, Venkatraman was put forward as an AIADMK candidate for the Chennai Corporation elections.

== Electoral performance ==
Election	Constituency	Political party	Result	Vote %	Opposition			Ref
Election	Constituency	Political party	Result	Vote %	Candidate	Political party	Vote %	Ref
2014 by-election	Alandur	AIADMK	Won	44.38%	Bharathr. R. S	DMK	35.08%	
