= R. Rajendran =

R. Rajendran may refer to:

- R. Rajendran (DMK politician), member of the Tamil Nadu Legislative Assembly from the Salem North constituency
- R. Rajendran (AIADMK politician), member of the Tamil Nadu Legislative Assembly from the Kurinjipadi constituency
