= SZK =

SZK may refer to:

- IATA code for Skukuza Airport
- Statistical zero knowledge, a computational complexity class introduced by Salil Vadhan
- Organization of the Kurdish language in People's Council of West Kurdistan
- szk, ISO code for the Ikizu language
- Slovenská živnostenská komora, a political lobbying group in Politics of Slovakia
