= Selvi Ramajayam =

Indian politician

Minister for Social Welfare and Nutritious Noon Meal Programme
- In office 16 May 2011 – 9 December 2011
- Chief Minister: J.Jayalalithaa
- Preceded by: P. Geetha Jeevan
- Succeeded by: B. Valarmathi

Personal details
- Party: All India Anna Dravida Munnetra Kazhagam

Selvi Ramajayam is an Indian politician an ex Member of the Legislative Assembly of Tamil Nadu from Bhuvanagiri constituency. As a cadre of All India Anna Dravida Munnetra Kazhagam, She was previously elected to the same Bhuvanagiri constituency in 2006 and 2011 elections.

== Electoral performance ==
Election	Constituency	Political party	Result	Vote %	Opposition			Ref
Election	Constituency	Political party	Result	Vote %	Candidate	Political party	Vote %	Ref
2006	Bhuvanagiri	AIADMK	Won	51.24%	K. Devadass	PMK	39.65%	
2011	Bhuvanagiri	AIADMK	Won	51.34%	T. Arivu Selvan	PMK	43.64%	
2016	Bhuvanagiri	AIADMK	Lost	28.85%	K. Saravanan Durai	DMK	31.73%	
2021	Kurinjipadi	AIADMK	Lost	42.48%	M. R. K. Panneerselvam	DMK	51.35%	-
