= M. Harish =

Indian politician (born 1995)

Member of the Tamil Nadu Legislative Assembly
- Incumbent
- Assumed office 11 May 2026
- Constituency: Alandur

Personal details
- Party: Tamilaga Vettri Kazhagam

M. Harish (born 1995) is an Indian politician from Tamil Nadu. He is a member of the Tamil Nadu Legislative Assembly from Alandur Assembly constituency in Chennai district representing Tamilaga Vettri Kazhagam.

Harish is from Alandur, Chennai district. He declared assets worth Rs.2.7 crore in the affidavit to the Election Commission of India.

== Career ==
Harish made his electoral debut as an MLA winning the 2026 Tamil Nadu Legislative Assembly election from Alandur Assembly constituency representing Tamilaga Vettri Kazhagam. He polled 1,12,205 votes and defeated his nearest opponent, T. M. Anbarasan of the Dravida Munnetra Kazhagam, by a margin of 29,609 votes.

== Electoral performance ==
Election	Constituency	Political party	Result	Vote %	Opposition			Ref
Election	Constituency	Political party	Result	Vote %	Candidate	Political party	Vote %	Ref
2026	Alandur	TVK	Won	42.90%	T. M. Anbarasan	DMK	31.58%	-
