= Alandur Assembly constituency =

State Legislative Assembly constituency in Tamil Nadu

Coordinates: 13.003899°N 80.203052°E

Alandur
- Constituency No. 28 for the Tamil Nadu Legislative Assembly

Constituency details
- Country: India
- Region: South India
- State: Tamil Nadu
- District: Chennai
- Lok Sabha constituency: Sriperumbudur
- Established: 1967
- Total electors: 3,01,127

Member of Legislative Assembly
- 17th Tamil Nadu Legislative Assembly
- Incumbent M. Harish
- Party: TVK
- Alliance: TVK+
- Elected year: 2026

Alandur is a legislative assembly in Chennai district and partially includes areas from Chengalpattu district and Kanchipuram district in the Indian state of Tamil Nadu. Its State Assembly Constituency number is 28. It consists of portions that includes the Alandur, Nanganallur, Kovur, Chennai, Adambakkam, Palavanthangal, Moulivakkam, Nandambakkam, Iyyapanthangal, Manapakkam, Mugalivakkam, Cowl Bazaar, St Thomas Mount cum Pallavaram Cantonment Board, Gerugambakkam, Kolapakkam, and some other parts of Chennai City and forms a part of Sriperumbudur Lok Sabha constituency for elections to the Parliament of India. It is one of the 234 State Legislative Assembly Constituencies in Tamil Nadu, in India.

== Members of the Legislative Assembly ==
Election	Member	Party
1977	K. M. Abdul Razack	All India Anna Dravida Munnetra Kazhagam
1980	K. M. Abdul Razack	All India Anna Dravida Munnetra Kazhagam
1984	M. Abraham	Dravida Munnetra Kazhagam
1989	C. Shanmugam	Dravida Munnetra Kazhagam
1991	S. Annamalai	All India Anna Dravida Munnetra Kazhagam
1996	C. Shanmugam	Dravida Munnetra Kazhagam
2001	B. Valarmathi	All India Anna Dravida Munnetra Kazhagam
2006	T. M. Anbarasan	Dravida Munnetra Kazhagam
2011	Panruti S. Ramachandran	Desiya Murpokku Dravida Kazhagam
2014 By-election	V. N. P. Venkatraman	All India Anna Dravida Munnetra Kazhagam
2016	T. M. Anbarasan	Dravida Munnetra Kazhagam
2021	T. M. Anbarasan	Dravida Munnetra Kazhagam
2026	M. Harish	Tamilaga Vettri Kazhagam

== Election results ==
Vote share of winning candidates
2026	42.90%
2021	49.12%
2016	44.64%
2011	45.52%
2006	46.85%
2001	47.59%
1996	66.23%
1991	58.45%
1989	42.88%
1984	49.14%
1980	50.18%
1977	37.45%

=== 2026 ===
2026 Tamil Nadu Legislative Assembly election : Alandur
Party	Candidate	Votes	%	±%
TVK	M. Harish	112,205	42.90	New
DMK	T. M. Anbarasan	82,596	31.58	▼17.94
AIADMK	S. Saravanan	52,243	19.97	New
NTK	Y. G. Mahalakshmi	10,405	3.98	▼3.03
NOTA	None of the above	1,263	0.48	▼0.33
Margin of victory		29,609	11.32	▼5.88
Turnout		261,666	86.90	▲25.72
Total valid votes		261,570		
Registered electors		301,127		▼22.61
TVK gain from DMK		Swing	▼6.62	

=== 2021 ===
2021 Tamil Nadu Legislative Assembly election : Alandur
Party	Candidate	Votes	%	±%
DMK	T. M. Anbarasan	116,785	49.52	▲4.88
AIADMK	B. Valarmathi	76,214	32.32	▼3.49
MNM	Sarathbabu	21,139	8.96	New
NTK	Dr. R. Karthikeyan	16,522	7.01	▲5.20
NOTA	None of the above	1,908	0.81	▼1.37
SDPI	M. Mohammed Thameem Ansari	1,770	0.75	New
Margin of victory		40,571	17.20	▲8.37
Turnout		238,072	61.18	▼0.57
Total valid votes		235,843		
Rejected ballots		321	0.13	▲0.12
Registered electors		389,118		▲10.71
DMK hold		Swing		

=== 2016 ===
2016 Tamil Nadu Legislative Assembly election : Alandur
Party	Candidate	Votes	%	±%
DMK	T. M. Anbarasan	96,877	44.64	▲9.56
AIADMK	Panruti S. Ramachandran	77,708	35.81	▼8.57
BJP	Dr. S. Sathyanarayanan	12,806	5.90	New
DMDK	U. Chandran	12,291	5.66	▼4.50
PMK	R. Srinivasan	7,194	3.32	New
NOTA	None of the above	4,727	2.18	▲0.07
NTK	Dhanachezhian	3,927	1.81	New
Margin of victory		19,169	8.83	▼0.47
Turnout		217,027	61.75	▼2.52
Total valid votes		216,997		
Rejected ballots		30	0.01	▼2.12
Registered electors		351,470		▲12.24
DMK gain from AIADMK		Swing	▲0.26	

=== Assembly by-election 2014 ===
2014 Tamil Nadu Legislative Assembly by-election : Alandur
Party	Candidate	Votes	%	±%
AIADMK	V. N. P. Venkatraman	89,295	44.38	New
DMK	R. S. Bharathi	70,587	35.08	New
DMDK	Kamaraja. M	20,442	10.16	▼35.36
INC	Nanjil Veswara Prasad	6,535	3.25	▼38.85
AAP	Gnand	5,729	2.85	New
NOTA	None of the above	4,248	2.11	New
Independent	Sathya. Narsan. N	2,556	1.27	
Margin of victory		18,708	9.30	▲5.88
Turnout		201,261	64.27	▼5.80
Total valid votes		201,216		
Rejected ballots		4,293	2.13	▲2.13
Registered electors		313,145		▲30.51
AIADMK gain from DMDK		Swing	▼1.14	

=== 2011 ===
2011 Tamil Nadu Legislative Assembly election : Alandur
Party	Candidate	Votes	%	±%
DMDK	Panruti S. Ramachandran	76,537	45.52	▲37.48
INC	Dr. K. Ghayathri Devi	70,783	42.10	New
BJP	Dr. S. Sathyanarayanan	9,628	5.73	▲2.46
Independent	L. Ayodhi	2,731	1.62	
Puratchi Bharatham	P. Thomas Barnabas	1,817	1.08	New
IJK	A. Anand	1,265	0.75	New
Margin of victory		5,754	3.42	▼2.88
Turnout		168,135	70.07	▲4.22
Total valid votes		168,135		
Registered electors		239,939		▼44.45
DMDK gain from DMK		Swing	▼1.33	

=== 2006 ===
2006 Tamil Nadu Legislative Assembly election : Alandur
Party	Candidate	Votes	%	±%
DMK	T. M. Anbarasan	133,232	46.85	New
AIADMK	B. Valarmathi	115,322	40.55	New
DMDK	R. Vijayakumar	22,866	8.04	New
BJP	H. Raja	9,298	3.27	New
Margin of victory		17,910	6.30	▼0.04
Turnout		284,421	65.85	▲18.89
Total valid votes		284,403		
Registered electors		431,953		▲2.07
DMK gain from AIADMK		Swing	▼0.74	

=== 2001 ===
2001 Tamil Nadu Legislative Assembly election : Alandur
Party	Candidate	Votes	%	±%
AIADMK	B. Valarmathi	94,554	47.59	▲24.18
M.G.R. Kazhagam	Eraama Veerappan	81,958	41.25	New
MDMK	R. Lavakumar	13,440	6.76	▲2.92
Puratchi Bharatham	B. Rajappa	2,728	1.37	New
Independent	P. N. Srinivasan	1,980	1.00	
Margin of victory		12,596	6.34	▼36.48
Turnout		198,708	46.96	▼10.00
Total valid votes		198,701		
Registered electors		423,174		▲33.55
AIADMK gain from DMK		Swing	▼18.64	

=== 1996 ===
1996 Tamil Nadu Legislative Assembly election : Alandur
Party	Candidate	Votes	%	±%
DMK	C. Shanmugam	117,545	66.23	▲30.86
AIADMK	K. Purushothaman	41,551	23.41	New
MDMK	Vijaya Thayanban	6,816	3.84	New
BJP	Tamilvinayagam	6,258	3.53	▲1.23
JP	P. Antony	2,008	1.13	▲0.70
KMK	Elangovan	1,673	0.94	New
Margin of victory		75,994	42.82	▲19.75
Turnout		180,490	56.96	▲4.90
Total valid votes		177,478		
Rejected ballots		3,040	1.68	▼0.15
Registered electors		316,856		▲7.01
DMK gain from AIADMK		Swing	▲7.78	

=== 1991 ===
1991 Tamil Nadu Legislative Assembly election : Alandur
Party	Candidate	Votes	%	±%
AIADMK	S. Annamalai	88,432	58.45	New
DMK	Pammal Nallathambi	53,521	35.37	▼7.51
PMK	A. Damodaran	4,401	2.91	New
BJP	S. Ranganath	3,474	2.30	▲0.78
Margin of victory		34,911	23.07	▲6.66
Turnout		154,153	52.06	▼12.66
Total valid votes		151,301		
Rejected ballots		2,816	1.83	▲0.14
Registered electors		296,098		▲18.84
AIADMK gain from DMK		Swing	▲15.57	

=== 1989 ===
1989 Tamil Nadu Legislative Assembly election : Alandur
Party	Candidate	Votes	%	±%
DMK	C. Shanmugam	67,985	42.88	▼6.26
AIADMK	K. Adaikalam	41,976	26.48	New
INC	S. Janarthanan	27,950	17.63	New
AIADMK	G. P. Lenin	15,092	9.52	New
BJP	P. Venkatakrishnan	2,417	1.52	▲0.22
Margin of victory		26,009	16.41	▲15.68
Turnout		161,261	64.72	▼2.17
Total valid votes		158,532		
Rejected ballots		2,729	1.69	▼1.55
Registered electors		249,164		▲29.26
DMK hold		Swing		

=== 1984 ===
1984 Tamil Nadu Legislative Assembly election : Alandur
Party	Candidate	Votes	%	±%
DMK	M. Abraham	61,300	49.14	New
AIADMK	R. Mohanarangam	60,394	48.41	▼1.77
BJP	C. K. Kesavan	1,618	1.30	New
Independent	V. Kosavan	772	0.62	
Margin of victory		906	0.73	▼5.09
Turnout		128,927	66.89	▲6.15
Total valid votes		124,756		
Rejected ballots		4,171	3.24	▲2.20
Registered electors		192,759		▲15.49
DMK gain from AIADMK		Swing	▼1.04	

=== 1980 ===
1980 Tamil Nadu Legislative Assembly election : Alandur
Party	Candidate	Votes	%	±%
AIADMK	K. M. Abdul Razack	50,345	50.18	New
INC	N. P. L. Sampath	44,506	44.36	▲36.37
JP	D. Duraivelu	2,919	2.91	New
Independent	T. L. Ragupathy	2,562	2.55	
Margin of victory		5,839	5.82	▲1.16
Turnout		101,383	60.74	▲6.50
Total valid votes		100,332		
Rejected ballots		1,051	1.04	▼0.08
Registered electors		166,900		▲8.27
AIADMK gain from AIADMK		Swing	▲12.73	

=== 1977 ===
1977 Tamil Nadu Legislative Assembly election : Alandur
Party	Candidate	Votes	%	±%
AIADMK	K. M. Abdul Razack	30,961	37.45	New
DMK	M. Abraham	27,112	32.80	New
JP	K. Narayanrao	17,042	20.62	New
INC	A. Ranganathan	6,608	7.99	New
Margin of victory		3,849	4.66	
Turnout		83,605	54.24	
Total valid votes		82,665		
Rejected ballots		940	1.12	
Registered electors		154,152		
AIADMK win (new seat)				
