= Sathya Panneerselvam =

Indian politician

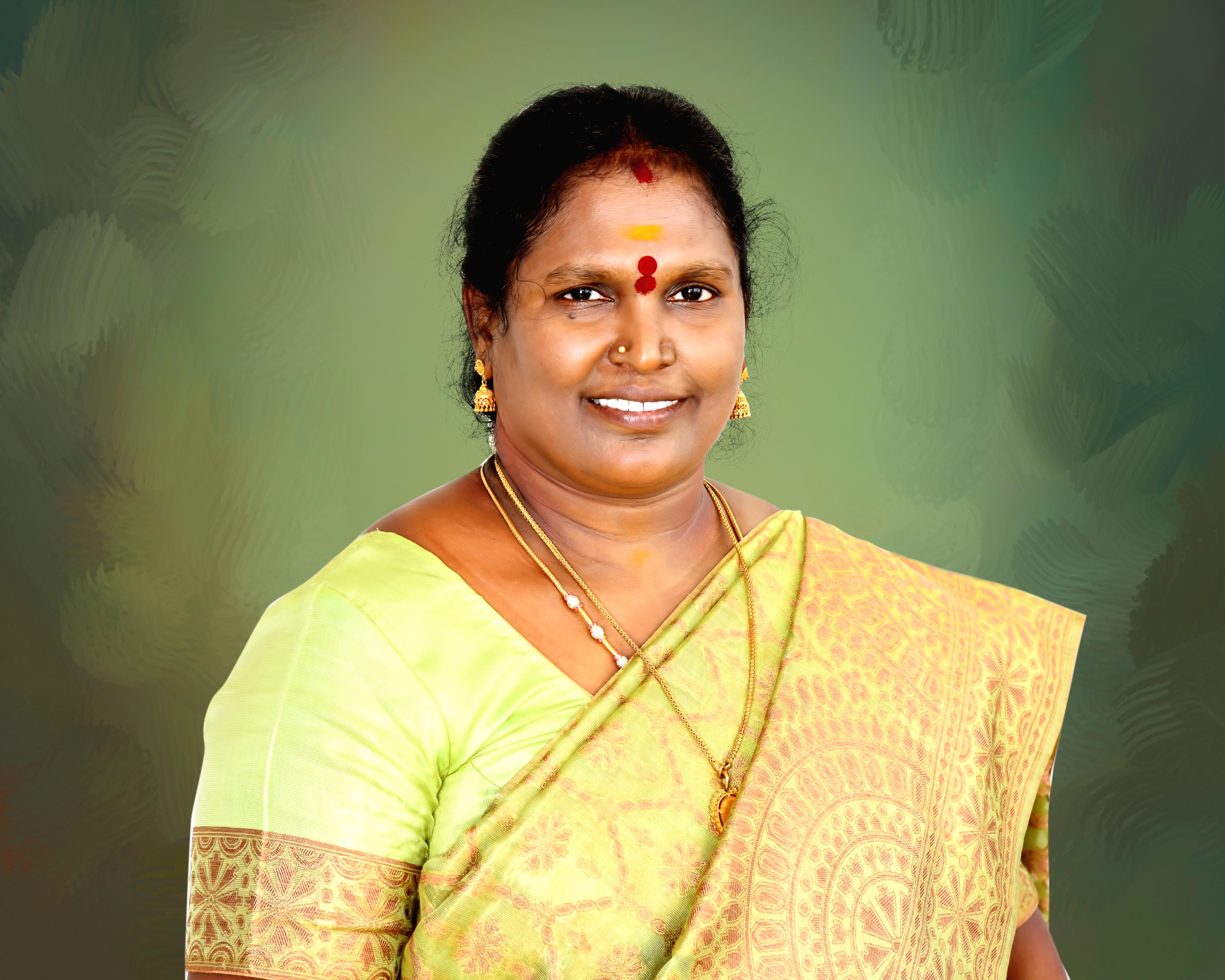

Member of the Tamil Nadu Legislative Assembly
- Constituency: Panruti
- Preceded by: P. Sivakozhundu
- Succeeded by: T. Velmurugan

Personal details
- Born: Panruti, Tamil Nadu, India
- Other political affiliations: All India Anna Dravida Munnetra Kazhagam

Sathya Panneerselvam also known as Sathya.P is an Indian politician and a former Member of the Legislative Assembly (MLA) of Tamil Nadu. She was elected to the Tamil Nadu Legislative Assembly in the 2016 elections as a candidate of the All India Anna Dravida Munnetra Kazhagam (AIADMK) party, representing the Panruti constituency in Cuddalore district.
