= A. Mani =

A. Mani may refer to the following Indian politicians:

- A. Mani (Dharmapuri politician) (born 1968), Lok Sabha member
- A. Mani (Nellikuppam MLA) (died 1996) Tamil Nadu Legislative Assembly member
- A. Mani (Ulundurpet MLA), Tamil Nadu Legislative Assembly member for Scheduled Castes
