= Veyyalore Nagar Panchayat =

Village in Tamil Nadu, India

Veyyalore Veyya luru
- Village Panchayat
- Location in Tamil Nadu, India Veyyalore (India)
- Coordinates: 11.45606°N 79.688°E
- Country: India
- State: Tamil Nadu
- District: Cuddalore

Population (2011)
  - Total: 2,234

Languages
  - Official: Tamil
- Time zone: UTC+5:30 (IST)

Veyyalore Town Panchayat (Veyyalore Gram Panchayat), is located in Keerapalayam district in Cuddalore district of Tamil Nadu. This panchayat falls under Bhuvanagiri Assembly constituency and Chidambaram Lok Sabha constituency. This panchayat has a total of 7 panchayat constituencies. 7 Panchayat Council members are elected from these. According to the 2011 India Census, the total population is 2234. Among them 1120 females and 1114 males.

== Villages ==
List of villages located in this panchayat:

1. Paripoorana nattam
2. Veyyalur
