= M. Abraham =

Indian politician

M. Abraham is an Indian politician and former Member of the Legislative Assembly of Tamil Nadu. He was elected to the Tamil Nadu Legislative Assembly as a Dravida Munnetra Kazhagam candidate representing the Alandur constituency in the 1984 election.
