= Panruti Assembly constituency =

One of the 234 State Legislative Assembly Constituencies in Tamil Nadu, in India

Coordinates: 11.77°N 79.55°E

Panruti
- Constituency No. 154 for the Tamil Nadu Legislative Assembly

Constituency details
- Country: India
- Region: South India
- State: Tamil Nadu
- District: Cuddalore
- Lok Sabha constituency: Cuddalore
- Established: 1951
- Total electors: 241,839
- Reservation: None

Member of Legislative Assembly
- 17th Tamil Nadu Legislative Assembly
- Incumbent K. Mohan
- Party: AIADMK
- Alliance: NDA
- Elected year: 2026

Panruti is a legislative assembly in Cuddalore district, which includes the city of Panruti. It is a part of Cuddalore Lok Sabha constituency. This constituency is notable for Panruti Ramachandran or Panruttiar, who was elected from this constituency six times, under three different parties, DMK, AIADMK and PMK. Elections were not held in the years 1957 and 1962. It is one of the 234 State Legislative Assembly Constituencies in Tamil Nadu, in India.

== Members of Legislative Assembly ==
Year	Member	Political party
Madras State
1952	S. Radhakrishnan	Tamil Nadu Toilers' Party
1967	S. Ramachandran	Dravida Munnetra Kazhagam
Tamil Nadu
1971	S. Ramachandaran	Dravida Munnetra Kazhagam
1977	S. Ramachandaran	All India Anna Dravida Munnetra Kazhagam
1980	S. Ramachandaran	All India Anna Dravida Munnetra Kazhagam
1984	S. Ramachandaran	All India Anna Dravida Munnetra Kazhagam
1989	K. N Gopalakirutinan	Dravida Munnetra Kazhagam
1991	S. Ramachandaran	Pattali Makkal Katchi
1996	V. Ramaswamy	Dravida Munnetra Kazhagam
2001	T. Velmurugan	Pattali Makkal Katchi
2006	T. Velmurugan	Pattali Makkal Katchi
2011	P. Sivakozhundu	Desiya Murpokku Dravida Kazhagam
2016	Sathya Panneerselvam	All India Anna Dravida Munnetra Kazhagam
2021	T. Velmurugan	Tamizhaga Vazhvurimai Katchi
2026	K. Mohan	All India Anna Dravida Munnetra Kazhagam

== Election results ==
Vote share of winning candidates
2026	37.20%
2021	47.60%
2016	39.01%
2011	50.91%
2006	38.18%
2001	37.67%
1996	57.32%
1991	37.51%
1989	56.24%
1984	53.97%
1980	51.88%
1977	59.24%
1971	52.06%
1967	60.82%
1952	55.34%

=== 2026 ===
2026 Tamil Nadu Legislative Assembly election:Panruti
Party	Candidate	Votes	%	±%
AIADMK	K. Mohan	78,398	37.20	▼8.02
VCK	Abdur Rahman.A.R	67,735	32.14	New
TVK	Manikandan.M	56,022	26.58	New
NTK	Banupriya.M	4,884	2.32	▼1.00
TVK	Surendar.R	1,449	0.69	▼46.91
NOTA	NOTA	907	0.43	▼0.24
Independent	Mohammed Safi.A	431	0.20	New
BSP	Srikanthu.S	412	0.20	New
Thamizhaka Padaippalar Makkal Katchi	Prakash.R	388	0.18	New
Independent	Ramalingam.A	141	0.07	New
Margin of victory		10,663	5.06	▲2.68
Turnout		2,10,767	87.15	▲6.87
Registered electors		2,41,839		▼3,612
AIADMK gain from TVK		Swing	▼8.02	

=== 2021 ===
2021 Tamil Nadu Legislative Assembly election: Panruti
Party	Candidate	Votes	%	±%
TVK	T. Velmurugan	93,801	47.60	+10.28
AIADMK	R. Rajendran	89,104	45.22	+6.21
NTK	R. Subhashini	6,547	3.32	+2.64
DMDK	P. Sivakozhundu	3,362	1.71	−8.22
MNM	Jaylani	1,670	0.85	New
NOTA	NOTA	1,323	0.67	−0.4
Margin of victory		4,697	2.38	0.70
Turnout		197,049	80.28	−1.69
Rejected ballots		495	0.25	
Registered electors		245,451		
TVK gain from AIADMK		Swing	8.59	

=== 2016 ===
2016 Tamil Nadu Legislative Assembly election: Panruti
Party	Candidate	Votes	%	±%
AIADMK	Sathya Panneerselvam	72,353	39.01	New
DMK	Ponkumar	69,225	37.33	−6.95
PMK	A. Dharmalingam	18,666	10.06	New
DMDK	P. Sivakozhundu	18,409	9.93	−40.98
NOTA	NOTA	1,988	1.07	New
BJP	S. R. Saravanan	1,373	0.74	+0.08
NTK	S. Mahaboobasha	1,262	0.68	New
Margin of victory		3,128	1.69	−4.95
Turnout		185,465	81.97	−1.28
Registered electors		226,257		
AIADMK gain from DMDK		Swing	-11.90	

=== 2011 ===
2011 Tamil Nadu Legislative Assembly election: Panruti
Party	Candidate	Votes	%	±%
DMDK	P. Sivakozhundu	82,187	50.91	+29.86
DMK	Saba Rajendran	71,471	44.27	New
IJK	R. Sankar	1,570	0.97	New
Puratchi Bharatham	M. Deiveegadas	1,155	0.72	New
BJP	R. M. Selvakumar	1,064	0.66	New
Independent	N. S. Velmurugan	943	0.58	New
BSP	K. K. Iyappan	859	0.53	New
Margin of victory		10,716	6.64	6.53
Turnout		161,443	83.25	1.59
Registered electors		193,924		
DMDK gain from PMK		Swing	12.73	

=== 2006 ===
2006 Tamil Nadu Legislative Assembly election: Panruti
Party	Candidate	Votes	%	±%
PMK	T. Velmurugan	54,653	38.18	+0.51
AIADMK	R. Rajendiran	54,505	38.08	New
DMDK	Panruti S. Ramachandran	30,133	21.05	New
Independent	S. Balu	1,366	0.95	New
Independent	V. K. Kumaraguru	793	0.55	New
Margin of victory		148	0.10	−4.03
Turnout		143,148	81.66	9.02
Registered electors		175,294		
PMK hold		Swing	0.51	

=== 2001 ===
2001 Tamil Nadu Legislative Assembly election: Panruti
Party	Candidate	Votes	%	±%
PMK	T. Velmurugan	45,963	37.67	+29.26
DMK	V. Ramaswamy	40,915	33.54	−23.79
MNK(PLP)	S. Ramachandran	30,459	24.97	New
MDMK	K. M. Selvamani	2,555	2.09	−7.28
Independent	V. K. Kumaraguru	2,111	1.73	New
Margin of victory		5,048	4.14	−28.84
Turnout		122,003	72.65	−4.50
Registered electors		168,037		
PMK gain from DMK		Swing	-19.65	

=== 1996 ===
1996 Tamil Nadu Legislative Assembly election: Panruti
Party	Candidate	Votes	%	±%
DMK	V. Ramaswamy	68,021	57.32	+31.62
AIADMK	R. Rajendran	28,891	24.35	−12.11
MDMK	K. Nandagopalakrishnan	11,123	9.37	New
PMK	N. Murugavel	9,988	8.42	New
Margin of victory		39,130	32.98	31.92
Turnout		118,663	77.15	1.24
Registered electors		161,495		
DMK gain from PMK		Swing	19.81	

=== 1991 ===
1991 Tamil Nadu Legislative Assembly election: Panruti
Party	Candidate	Votes	%	±%
PMK	S. Ramachandaran	39,911	37.51	New
AIADMK	R. M. Devasudaram	38,789	36.45	+17.68
DMK	A. Mani	27,354	25.71	−30.53
Margin of victory		1,122	1.05	−36.41
Turnout		106,407	75.91	3.83
Registered electors		147,023		
PMK gain from DMK		Swing	-18.73	

=== 1989 ===
1989 Tamil Nadu Legislative Assembly election: Panruti
Party	Candidate	Votes	%	±%
DMK	K. Nanda Gopalakirutinan	52,395	56.24	+10.21
AIADMK	R. Devasudaram	17,487	18.77	−35.2
INC	G. Asokan	8,636	9.27	New
AIADMK	R. Krishnamurthy	7,223	7.75	−46.22
Independent	T. Kaliyamurthy	7,104	7.63	New
Margin of victory		34,908	37.47	29.53
Turnout		93,166	72.08	−13.39
Registered electors		132,406		
DMK gain from AIADMK		Swing	2.27	

=== 1984 ===
1984 Tamil Nadu Legislative Assembly election: Panruti
Party	Candidate	Votes	%	±%
AIADMK	S. Ramachandaran	51,900	53.97	+2.09
DMK	K. Nandagopala Krishnan	44,263	46.03	−0.62
Margin of victory		7,637	7.94	2.72
Turnout		96,163	85.47	8.21
Registered electors		117,364		
AIADMK hold		Swing	2.09	

=== 1980 ===
1980 Tamil Nadu Legislative Assembly election: Panruti
Party	Candidate	Votes	%	±%
AIADMK	S. Ramachandaran	44,557	51.88	−7.36
DMK	K. Nandagopala Krishnan	40,070	46.65	New
JP	Seenuvasan Alias Seenu	681	0.79	New
Margin of victory		4,487	5.22	−16.18
Turnout		85,891	77.26	3.72
Registered electors		112,744		
AIADMK hold		Swing	-7.36	

=== 1977 ===
1977 Tamil Nadu Legislative Assembly election: Panruti
Party	Candidate	Votes	%	±%
AIADMK	S. Ramachandaran	43,330	59.24	New
JP	K. Nandagopala Krishnan	27,673	37.83	New
INC	S. Thiyagarajan	2,139	2.92	−38.04
Margin of victory		15,657	21.41	10.31
Turnout		73,142	73.54	−0.52
Registered electors		100,977		
AIADMK gain from DMK		Swing	7.18	

=== 1971 ===
1971 Tamil Nadu Legislative Assembly election: Panruti
Party	Candidate	Votes	%	±%
DMK	S. Ramachandaran	42,141	52.06	−8.76
INC	S. V. Vadivelu Padayachi	33,156	40.96	+1.78
CPI(M)	S. Natarajan	5,643	6.97	New
Margin of victory		8,985	11.10	−10.54
Turnout		80,940	74.06	4.21
Registered electors		116,399		
DMK hold		Swing	-8.76	

=== 1967 ===
1967 Madras Legislative Assembly election: Panruti
Party	Candidate	Votes	%	±%
DMK	S. Ramachandaran	43,745	60.82	New
INC	S. V. Vadivelu Padayachi	28,179	39.18	New
Margin of victory		15,566	21.64	
Turnout		71,924	69.85	
Registered electors		106,540		
DMK win (new seat)				

=== 1952 ===
1952 Madras Legislative Assembly election: Panruti
Party	Candidate	Votes	%	±%
TTP	S. Radhakrishnan	28,972	55.34	New
INC	P. A. Raganatha Padayachi	18,427	35.20	New
Independent	B. Peter	2,592	4.95	New
Socialist Party (India)	P. V. Pandarinathan	2,357	4.50	New
Margin of victory		10,545	20.14	
Turnout		52,348	61.50	
Registered electors		85,118		
TTP win (new seat)				
