= K. Mohan (politician) =

Indian politician

Member of the Tamil Nadu Legislative Assembly
- Incumbent
- Assumed office 11 May 2026
- Preceded by: T. Velmurugan
- Constituency: Panruti

Personal details
- Party: All India Anna Dravida Munnetra Kazhagam
- Parent: V. Kaliyavaranthan (father)
- Occupation: Businessman, politician

K. Mohan is an Indian politician who is a Member of the 17th Legislative Assembly of Tamil Nadu. He was elected from Panruti as an AIADMK candidate in 2026.

== Elections contested ==
2026 Tamil Nadu Legislative Assembly election: Panruti
Party	Candidate	Votes	%	±%
AIADMK	K. Mohan	78,398	37.20%	−8.02%
VCK	Abdul Rahman	67,735	32.14%	+32.14%
TVK	M. Manikandan	56,022	26.58%	New
NTK	M. Bhanu Priya	4,884	2.32%	−1.00%
TVK	R. Surendar	1,449	0.69%	−46.91%
NOTA	NOTA	907	0.43%	
Margin of victory		10,663	5.06%	+2.68%
Turnout				
Rejected ballots				
Registered electors		240,048		
AIADMK gain from TVK		Swing		
