= New Viruthakirikuppam =

New Viruthakirikuppam is a village. it is also called as puthu viruthakirikuppam in Tamil. It is in Virudhachalam taluk near Neyveli in Cuddalore district, Tamil Nadu state in southern India. It is fifteen kilometers far from Virudhachalam. Mudhanai is five kilometer far from new viruthakirikuppam. It is in between Etakuppam and Pazhaya Viruthakirikuppam. There is a government middle school and a church dedicated to Our Lady of Good Health(called arokia annai alayam in Tamil language). The church is under the parish of Iruppukuricy of the Roman Catholic Archdiocese of Pondicherry and Cuddalore. There are two hundred Hindu families, about seventy Christian families and six families of barbars.

== Demographics ==
Around eight hundred people live in this village. Many of them are Hindus. Around hundred and fifty people are Christians. Around fifty people are barbers.

== Geology ==
The soil in New Viruthakirikuppam is good for all kinds of agricultural works. The main basis of the local economy is agriculture, including sugar cane, ground nuts, green grain and other crops. people cultivate groundnuts a lot in this areas. people also cultivate cashew nuts, mango and jack fruit.

== Churches and temples ==
There are three temples and a church in the village.
