= P. S. Arul =

Indian politician

P. S. Arul was elected to the Tamil Nadu Legislative Assembly from the Bhuvanagiri constituency in the 2001 elections. He ran as an independent and supported by AIADMK, After Nomination Rejection of J. Jayalalithaa and another candidate. He stood under Banana Symbol.

== Electoral performance ==
Election	Constituency	Political party	Result	Vote %	Opposition			Ref
Election	Constituency	Political party	Result	Vote %	Candidate	Political party	Vote %	Ref
2001	Bhuvanagiri	Independent	Won	44.85%	M. Gopalakrishanan	Makkal Tamil Desam	41.46%	
