= Nellikkuppam Assembly constituency =

One of the 234 State Legislative Assembly Constituencies in Tamil Nadu, in India

Coordinates: 11.78°N 79.67°E

Nellikkuppam
- Former constituency for the Tamil Nadu Legislative Assembly

Constituency details
- Country: India
- Region: South India
- State: Tamil Nadu
- District: Cuddalore
- Established: 1957
- Abolished: 2008
- Total electors: 1,64,369
- Reservation: None

Nellikkuppam is the legislative assembly in Cuddalore district, that includes the city, Nellikuppam. Nellikkupam Assembly constituency is a part of Cuddalore Lok Sabha constituency. It is one of the 234 State Legislative Assembly Constituencies in Tamil Nadu, in India.

== Members of the Legislative Assembly ==
Year	Winner	Party
Madras State
1957 (Note: 2-member constituency)	S. Thangavelu	Indian National Congress
1957	Sivachidambara Ramasamy Padayachi	Indian National Congress
1962	V. Krishnamurthy Gounder	Dravida Munnetra Kazhagam
1967	C. Govindarajan	Communist Party of India (Marxist)

=== Tamil Nadu ===
Assembly	Duration	Winner	Party
Fifth	1971–77	V. Krishnamoorthi Gounder	Dravida Munnetra Kazhagam
Sixth	1977–80	C. Govindarajan	Communist Party of India (Marxist)
Seventh	1980–84	V. Krishnamoorthi	Dravida Munnetra Kazhagam
Eighth	1984–89	Anbarasan	All India Anna Dravida Munnetra Kazhagam
Ninth	1989–91	S. Krishnamoorthy	Dravida Munnetra Kazhagam
Tenth	1991–96	M.C. Dhamodaran	All India Anna Dravida Munnetra Kazhagam
Eleventh	1996–96	A. Mani	Dravida Munnetra Kazhagam
Eleventh	1996–2000	S. Krishnamoorthy (Note: By-election due to the death of A. Mani in 1996.)	Dravida Munnetra Kazhagam
Eleventh	2000–01	V.C. Shanmugam (Note: By-election due to the resignation of S. Krishnamoorthy in 2000.)	Dravida Munnetra Kazhagam
Twelfth	2001–06	M. C. Sampath	All India Anna Dravida Munnetra Kazhagam
Thirteenth	2006-Incumbent	Saba Rajendran	Dravida Munnetra Kazhagam

== Election results ==
Vote share of winning candidates
2006	46.16%
2001	50.93%
1996	53.84%
1991	59.61%
1989	31.88%
1984	56.71%
1980	55.17%
1977	32.75%
1971	44.93%
1967	47.24%
1962	56.14%
1957	27.38%

=== 2006 ===
2006 Tamil Nadu Legislative Assembly election: Nellikkuppam
Party	Candidate	Votes	%	±%
DMK	Saba Rajendran	57,403	46.16%	+1.9
MDMK	R. T. Sabapathi Mohan	45,323	36.44%	+33.99
DMDK	P. Sivakolunthu	15,853	12.75%	New
BJP	J. Sugumaran	1,160	0.93%	New
Independent	M. Saravanan	1,043	0.84%	New
BSP	K. Iyappan	947	0.76%	New
Independent	P. Sarangapani	924	0.74%	New
CPI(ML)L	N. Kaliyamoorthy	889	0.71%	New
Margin of victory		12,080	9.71%	3.04%
Turnout		124,365	75.66%	6.71%
Registered electors		164,369		
DMK gain from AIADMK		Swing	-4.78%	

=== 2001 ===
2001 Tamil Nadu Legislative Assembly election: Nellikkuppam
Party	Candidate	Votes	%	±%
AIADMK	M. C. Sampath	56,349	50.93%	+20.67
DMK	V. C. Shanmugham	48,967	44.26%	−9.58
MDMK	A. S. Soundhararajan	2,713	2.45%	−2.96
Independent	P. Jeyachandran	1,716	1.55%	New
Independent	K. Sekar	886	0.80%	New
Margin of victory		7,382	6.67%	−16.90%
Turnout		110,631	68.95%	−3.64%
Registered electors		160,479		
AIADMK gain from DMK		Swing	-2.90%	

=== 1996 ===
1996 Tamil Nadu Legislative Assembly election: Nellikkuppam
Party	Candidate	Votes	%	±%
DMK	A. Mani	57,977	53.84%	New
AIADMK	M. C. Dhamodaran	32,594	30.27%	−29.34
PMK	A. Devanathan	7,180	6.67%	New
MDMK	V. Krishnamoorthi	5,827	5.41%	New
Independent	J. Balasubramanian	2,133	1.98%	New
BJP	M. Selvakumar	589	0.55%	New
Margin of victory		25,383	23.57%	−12.91%
Turnout		107,689	72.59%	2.89%
Registered electors		155,744		
DMK gain from AIADMK		Swing	-5.77%	

=== 1991 ===
1991 Tamil Nadu Legislative Assembly election: Nellikkuppam
Party	Candidate	Votes	%	±%
AIADMK	C. Damotharan	57,373	59.61%	+42.42
CPI(M)	C. Govindarajan	22,265	23.13%	−8.75
PMK	A. Devanathan	15,610	16.22%	New
Independent	M. Selvam	540	0.56%	New
Margin of victory		35,108	36.48%	22.59%
Turnout		96,250	69.71%	5.13%
Registered electors		145,061		
AIADMK gain from CPI(M)		Swing	27.72%	

=== 1989 ===
1989 Tamil Nadu Legislative Assembly election: Nellikkuppam
Party	Candidate	Votes	%	±%
DMK	S. Krishnamoorthy	26,233	31.88%	+0.42
Independent	N. V. Jayaseelan	14,804	17.99%	New
AIADMK	C. Damodharan	14,143	17.19%	−39.52
INC	Vasu Selvaraju	11,981	14.56%	New
Independent	M. Velayutham	9,241	11.23%	New
Independent	S. Kaliyaperumal Padayatchi	3,173	3.86%	New
Independent	S. D. Krishnamurthy	1,423	1.73%	New
Independent	S. Veeraputhiran	540	0.66%	New
Margin of victory		11,429	13.89%	−11.35%
Turnout		82,278	64.57%	−12.72%
Registered electors		130,637		
CPI(M) gain from AIADMK		Swing	-24.82%	

=== 1984 ===
1984 Tamil Nadu Legislative Assembly election: Nellikkuppam
Party	Candidate	Votes	%	±%
AIADMK	Anbarasan Alias Ramalingam	48,018	56.71%	New
CPI(M)	C. Govindarajan	26,641	31.46%	−7.22
Independent	Pandurangan	7,520	8.88%	New
Independent	Rajalakshmi	763	0.90%	New
Independent	Arjunan	490	0.58%	New
Independent	Abdul Wahab	448	0.53%	New
Margin of victory		21,377	25.25%	8.76%
Turnout		84,676	77.29%	10.58%
Registered electors		117,487		
AIADMK gain from DMK		Swing	1.54%	

=== 1980 ===
1980 Tamil Nadu Legislative Assembly election: Nellikkuppam
Party	Candidate	Votes	%	±%
DMK	V. Krishnamurthy Gounder	40,526	55.17%	+29.26
CPI(M)	C. Govindarajan	28,415	38.68%	+5.93
JP	C. Dhandapani	3,655	4.98%	New
RPI	R. V. Seetharaman	859	1.17%	New
Margin of victory		12,111	16.49%	9.65%
Turnout		73,455	66.71%	−0.89%
Registered electors		111,615		
DMK gain from CPI(M)		Swing	22.42%	

=== 1977 ===
1977 Tamil Nadu Legislative Assembly election: Nellikkuppam
Party	Candidate	Votes	%	±%
CPI(M)	C. Govindarajan	23,077	32.75%	+20.65
DMK	V. Krishnamurthy Gounder	18,260	25.91%	−19.02
JP	S. L. Krishnamoorthy	14,217	20.18%	New
INC	K. G. Kandhan	9,444	13.40%	−22.1
Independent	N. V. Jayaseelan	5,466	7.76%	New
Margin of victory		4,817	6.84%	−2.59%
Turnout		70,464	67.60%	−9.40%
Registered electors		106,084		
CPI(M) gain from DMK		Swing	-12.18%	

=== 1971 ===
1971 Tamil Nadu Legislative Assembly election: Nellikkuppam
Party	Candidate	Votes	%	±%
DMK	V. Krishnamurthy Gounder	27,741	44.93%	New
INC	K. G. Kandan	21,921	35.50%	−3.37
CPI(M)	C. Govindaranjan	7,471	12.10%	−35.14
Independent	C. Gunasekaran	4,325	7.01%	New
Margin of victory		5,820	9.43%	1.06%
Turnout		61,741	76.99%	0.82%
Registered electors		87,406		
DMK gain from CPI(M)		Swing	-2.31%	

=== 1967 ===
1967 Madras Legislative Assembly election: Nellikkuppam
Party	Candidate	Votes	%	±%
CPI(M)	C. Govindarajan	28,090	47.24%	New
INC	A. Lakshminarayanan	23,117	38.88%	−3.12
Independent	S. S. Chandrasekaran	5,537	9.31%	New
Independent	M. Gangachalam	1,633	2.75%	New
Independent	V. Rajaram	1,085	1.82%	New
Margin of victory		4,973	8.36%	−5.78%
Turnout		59,462	76.18%	3.94%
Registered electors		84,171		
CPI(M) gain from DMK		Swing	-8.90%	

=== 1962 ===
1962 Madras Legislative Assembly election: Nellikkuppam
Party	Candidate	Votes	%	±%
DMK	V. Krishnamurthy Gounder	37,419	56.14%	New
INC	L. Subbarayalu Reddiar	27,989	41.99%	+14.61
Independent	G. Ramachandran	1,245	1.87%	New
Margin of victory		9,430	14.15%	12.57%
Turnout		66,653	72.24%	−24.16%
Registered electors		95,780		
DMK gain from INC		Swing	28.76%	

=== 1957 ===
1957 Madras Legislative Assembly election: Nellikkuppam
Party	Candidate	Votes	%	±%
INC	Sivachidambara Ramasamy Padayachi	42,890	27.38%	New
Independent	Krishnamoorthy Goundar	40,417	25.80%	New
INC	S. Thangavelu	34,299	21.90%	New
Independent	Rajaangam (Sc)	29,492	18.83%	New
Independent	Perumal (Sc)	9,554	6.10%	New
Margin of victory		2,473	1.58%	
Turnout		156,652	96.40%	
Registered electors		162,499		
INC win (new seat)				
