= Kurinjipadi Assembly constituency =

One of the 234 State Legislative Assembly Constituencies in Tamil Nadu, in India

Coordinates: 11.57°N 79.60°E

Kurinjipadi
- Constituency No. 156 for the Tamil Nadu Legislative Assembly

Constituency details
- Country: India
- Region: South India
- State: Tamil Nadu
- District: Cuddalore
- Lok Sabha constituency: Cuddalore
- Established: 1962
- Total electors: 238,287
- Reservation: None

Member of Legislative Assembly
- 17th Tamil Nadu Legislative Assembly
- Incumbent M. R. K. Panneerselvam
- Party: DMK
- Elected year: 2026

Kurinjipadi is a legislative assembly constituency in Cuddalore district, which includes Vadalur municipality and Kurinjipadi Town Panchayat. There are 59 Panchayats, including 39 Village Panchayats of Kurinjipadi Panchayat Union and 20 Panchayats of Cuddalore Panchayat Union. It is a part of Cuddalore Lok Sabha constituency. It is one of the 234 State Legislative Assembly Constituencies in Tamil Nadu, in India. Before 1977, Kurinjipadi Assembly constituency was reserved for Scheduled Castes. Most successful party: DMK (ten times)

== Members of Legislative Assembly ==
=== Madras State ===
Year	Winner	Party
1962	N. Rajangam	Dravida Munnetra Kazhagam
1967	N. Rajangam	Dravida Munnetra Kazhagam

=== Tamil Nadu ===
Assembly	Duration	Winner	Party
Fifth	1971-77	N. Rajangam	Dravida Munnetra Kazhagam
Sixth	1977-80	M. Selvaraj	Dravida Munnetra Kazhagam
Seventh	1980-84	A. Thangarasu	All India Anna Dravida Munnetra Kazhagam
Eighth	1984-89	A. Thangarasu	All India Anna Dravida Munnetra Kazhagam
Ninth	1989-91	N. Ganeshmurthy	Dravida Munnetra Kazhagam
Tenth	1991-96	K. Sivasubramanian	All India Anna Dravida Munnetra Kazhagam
Eleventh	1996-01	M. R. K. Panneerselvam	Dravida Munnetra Kazhagam
Twelfth	2001-06	M. R. K. Panneerselvam	Dravida Munnetra Kazhagam
Thirteenth	2006-11	M. R. K. Panneerselvam	Dravida Munnetra Kazhagam
Fourteenth	2011-16	R. Rajendran	All India Anna Dravida Munnetra Kazhagam
Fifteenth	2016-21	M.R.K.Panneerselvam	Dravida Munnetra Kazhagam
Sixteenth	2021-2026	M.R.K.Panneerselvam	Dravida Munnetra Kazhagam
Seventeenth	2026-Incumbent	M.R.K.Panneerselvam	Dravida Munnetra Kazhagam

== Election results ==
Vote share of winning candidates
2026	35.84%
2021	51.35%
2016	44.03%
2011	56.38%
2006	45.64%
2001	55.78%
1996	54.99%
1991	46.92%
1989	47.14%
1984	49.90%
1980	49.65%
1977	28.75%
1971	51.43%
1967	54.50%
1962	56.48%

=== 2026 ===
2026 Tamil Nadu Legislative Assembly election: Kurinjipadi
Party	Candidate	Votes	%	±%
DMK	M.R.K.Panneerselvam	76,695	35.84	▼15.51
AIADMK	A Bhuvanenthiran	69,106	32.30	▼10.18
TVK	Rajkumar D	53,110	24.82	New
TVK	T Kannan	7,113	3.32	New
NTK	Kavitha Renganathan	4,813	2.25	▼2.06
Independent	Arumugam R	928	0.43	New
NOTA	NOTA	629	0.29	▼0.32
Independent	Manimala R	458	0.21	New
Tamil Telugu National Party	R Srinivasan	323	0.15	New
BSP	M Kanagaraj	273	0.13	▼0.11
Independent	Dhanakesavamoorthy A.C.T	265	0.12	New
Independent	Muthazhagan N	252	0.12	New
Margin of victory		7,589	3.54	▼5.33
Turnout		2,13,965	89.79	▲8.54
Registered electors		2,38,287		▼4,877
DMK hold		Swing	▼15.51	

=== 2021 ===
2021 Tamil Nadu Legislative Assembly election: Kurinjipadi
Party	Candidate	Votes	%	±%
DMK	M. R. K. Panneerselvam	101,456	51.35%	▲7.32
AIADMK	Selvi Ramajayam	83,929	42.48%	▲13.39
NTK	S. Sumathi	8,512	4.31%	▲3.49
NOTA	Nota	1,212	0.61%	▼0.21
JD(S)	K. Chandramouli	1,189	0.60%	New
AMMK	A. Vasanthakumar	837	0.42%	New
Independent	R. Rajesh	515	0.26%	New
BSP	T. Velayudham	482	0.24%	▲0.09
Independent	R. Sarathkumar	154	0.08%	New
AIADMK	R. Muthukrishnan	140	0.07%	▼29.02
Independent	L. Madhiyazhagan	139	0.07%	New
Margin of victory		17,527	8.87%	−6.06%
Turnout		197,569	81.25%	−2.93%
Rejected ballots		468	0.24%	
Registered electors		243,164		
DMK hold		Swing	7.32%	

=== 2016 ===
2016 Tamil Nadu Legislative Assembly election: Kurinjipadi
Party	Candidate	Votes	%	±%
DMK	M. R. K. Panneerselvam	82,864	44.03%	▲2.87
AIADMK	R. Rajendran	54,756	29.09%	▼27.29
PMK	S. Muthukrishnan	22,705	12.06%	New
DMDK	K. M. S. Balamurugan	21,063	11.19%	New
NOTA	None Of The Above	1,541	0.82%	New
NTK	V. Jaladeepan	1,534	0.82%	New
BJP	Mu. Shakthi Ganapathy	957	0.51%	▼0.21
Independent	A. Tatabirla	855	0.45%	New
Independent	A. P. Muthukumaran	636	0.34%	New
Independent	R. Murugan	342	0.18%	New
BSP	S. Senthilmurugan	288	0.15%	▼0.4
Margin of victory		28,108	14.93%	−0.28%
Turnout		188,205	84.18%	−1.96%
Registered electors		223,575		
DMK gain from AIADMK		Swing	-12.35%	

=== 2011 ===
2011 Tamil Nadu Legislative Assembly election: Kurinjipadi
Party	Candidate	Votes	%	±%
AIADMK	R. Rajendran	88,345	56.38%	New
DMK	M. R. K. Panneerselvam	64,497	41.16%	▼4.48
Independent	R. Panneerselvam	1,863	1.19%	New
BJP	A. S. Vairakannu	1,123	0.72%	▼0.09
BSP	T. S. Premalatha	866	0.55%	▲0.04
Margin of victory		23,848	15.22%	13.67%
Turnout		181,914	86.14%	12.35%
Registered electors		156,694		
AIADMK gain from DMK		Swing	10.74%	

=== 2006 ===
2006 Tamil Nadu Legislative Assembly election: Kurinjipadi
Party	Candidate	Votes	%	±%
DMK	M. R. K. Panneerselvam	56,462	45.64%	▼10.14
MDMK	N. Ramalingam	54,547	44.09%	▲38.62
DMDK	R. Sundara Moorthy	8,541	6.90%	New
BJP	D. Saravanas Undaram	1,002	0.81%	New
BSP	G. Hari Krishnan	636	0.51%	▼0.33
RSP	C. Kaliyamoorthy	590	0.48%	New
Independent	A. Bala Subramanian	515	0.42%	New
Independent	V. Pazhni Murugan	431	0.35%	New
Independent	B. Kantharajan	334	0.27%	New
Independent	P. Chandra	276	0.22%	New
JD(U)	S. Muralidharan	206	0.17%	New
Margin of victory		1,915	1.55%	−18.80%
Turnout		123,708	73.79%	13.62%
Registered electors		167,658		
DMK hold		Swing	-10.14%	

=== 2001 ===
2001 Tamil Nadu Legislative Assembly election: Kurinjipadi
Party	Candidate	Votes	%	±%
DMK	M. R. K. Panneerselvam	65,425	55.78%	▲0.8
AIADMK	Sivasubramanian K	41,562	35.44%	▲12.4
MDMK	N. Ramalingam	6,415	5.47%	New
Independent	Susila G	1,007	0.86%	New
BSP	M. Jawahar Mohan	985	0.84%	New
Independent	B. S. Ramanathan	864	0.74%	New
Independent	Rajendran C	594	0.51%	New
Independent	Ravi G	431	0.37%	New
Margin of victory		23,863	20.35%	−11.60%
Turnout		117,283	60.17%	−6.83%
Registered electors		194,949		
DMK hold		Swing	0.80%	

=== 1996 ===
1996 Tamil Nadu Legislative Assembly election: Kurinjipadi
Party	Candidate	Votes	%	±%
DMK	MRK Panneer selvam	67,152	54.99%	▲19.47
AIADMK	N. Pandarinathan	28,139	23.04%	▼23.88
PMK	M. Gnanamoorthy	12,231	10.02%	New
CPI(M)	K. Balakrishnan	11,387	9.32%	New
BJP	M. Ashokkumar	1,717	1.41%	New
Independent	T. Selvaraj	231	0.19%	New
Independent	Muthupattusamy	216	0.18%	New
Independent	N. Muthazhagan	186	0.15%	New
Independent	G. Kumaraguru	139	0.11%	New
Independent	S. S. Nathan	137	0.11%	New
Independent	R. Baskar	123	0.10%	New
Margin of victory		39,013	31.95%	20.54%
Turnout		122,122	67.00%	1.42%
Registered electors		190,256		
DMK gain from AIADMK		Swing	8.07%	

=== 1991 ===
1991 Tamil Nadu Legislative Assembly election: Kurinjipadi
Party	Candidate	Votes	%	±%
AIADMK	K. Sivasubramanian	51,313	46.92%	▲30.07
DMK	N. M. Ganeshmurthy	38,842	35.52%	▼11.62
PMK	A. Thangarasu	18,638	17.04%	New
Independent	R. N. Anbuduraisamy	571	0.52%	New
Margin of victory		12,471	11.40%	−18.89%
Turnout		109,364	65.59%	−0.21%
Registered electors		172,154		
AIADMK gain from DMK		Swing	-0.22%	

=== 1989 ===
1989 Tamil Nadu Legislative Assembly election: Kurinjipadi
Party	Candidate	Votes	%	±%
DMK	N. Ganeshmurthy	44,887	47.14%	▲9.29
AIADMK	R. Rasendran	16,043	16.85%	▼33.05
INC	C. Natesan	15,000	15.75%	New
AIADMK	R. Sivashanmugam	7,923	8.32%	▼41.58
India Farmers and Tailers Party	R. Shanmugasundaram	6,311	6.63%	New
Independent	K. V. Dakshinamurthy	1,019	1.07%	New
Independent	V. Jayakumar	955	1.00%	New
Independent	M. P. Thangavel	843	0.89%	New
Independent	A. Arasuganesan	823	0.86%	New
Independent	G. Dhanagopal	610	0.64%	New
INS(SCS)	M. K. S. Rahiman Sait	319	0.34%	New
Margin of victory		28,844	30.29%	18.24%
Turnout		95,222	65.80%	−11.44%
Registered electors		147,835		
DMK gain from AIADMK		Swing	-2.76%	

=== 1984 ===
1984 Tamil Nadu Legislative Assembly election: Kurinjipadi
Party	Candidate	Votes	%	±%
AIADMK	A. Thangarasu	45,400	49.90%	▲0.25
DMK	C. Kuppusami	34,434	37.85%	▼7.98
Independent	N. Pandarinathan	10,908	11.99%	New
Independent	Murthupattusamy	239	0.26%	New
Margin of victory		10,966	12.05%	8.22%
Turnout		90,981	77.24%	9.36%
Registered electors		124,612		
AIADMK hold		Swing	0.25%	

=== 1980 ===
1980 Tamil Nadu Legislative Assembly election: Kurinjipadi
Party	Candidate	Votes	%	±%
AIADMK	A. Thangarasu	38,349	49.65%	New
DMK	M. Selvaraj	35,390	45.82%	▲17.07
RPI	P. Elumalai	2,083	2.70%	New
Independent	P. Dhayalan	929	1.20%	New
Independent	K. T. P. Palaniappa Nadar	246	0.32%	New
Independent	R. Palanivelu	118	0.15%	New
Independent	Mathu Pattusamy	116	0.15%	New
Margin of victory		2,959	3.83%	0.11%
Turnout		77,231	67.88%	5.94%
Registered electors		115,509		
AIADMK gain from DMK		Swing	20.90%	

=== 1977 ===
1977 Tamil Nadu Legislative Assembly election: Kurinjipadi
Party	Candidate	Votes	%	±%
DMK	M. Selvaraj	19,523	28.75%	▼22.68
CPI(M)	S. Natarrajan	16,997	25.03%	New
INC	P. Radhakrishnan	14,663	21.60%	▼26.98
JP	M. Balasubramaniyan	13,080	19.26%	New
Independent	S. Ramaswamy	1,818	2.68%	New
Independent	K. Dhanagopal	1,690	2.49%	New
Independent	Muthupattusamy	127	0.19%	New
Margin of victory		2,526	3.72%	0.86%
Turnout		67,898	61.94%	−7.63%
Registered electors		111,845		
DMK hold		Swing	-22.68%	

=== 1971 ===
1971 Tamil Nadu Legislative Assembly election: Kurinjipadi
Party	Candidate	Votes	%	±%
DMK	N. Rajangam	27,465	51.43%	▼3.07
INC	M. Jayaraman	25,939	48.57%	▲9.58
Margin of victory		1,526	2.86%	−12.66%
Turnout		53,404	69.57%	3.69%
Registered electors		79,098		
DMK hold		Swing	-3.07%	

=== 1967 ===
1967 Madras Legislative Assembly election: Kurinjipadi
Party	Candidate	Votes	%	±%
DMK	N. Rajangam	25,478	54.50%	▼1.98
INC	M. Jayaraman	18,226	38.99%	▲0.4
Independent	P. Vaithilingam	1,569	3.36%	New
Independent	G. Dhanagopal	1,473	3.15%	New
Margin of victory		7,252	15.51%	−2.37%
Turnout		46,746	65.88%	3.49%
Registered electors		74,712		
DMK hold		Swing	-1.98%	

=== 1962 ===
1962 Madras Legislative Assembly election: Kurinjipadi
Party	Candidate	Votes	%	±%
DMK	N. Rajangam	32,046	56.48%	New
INC	M. Jayaraman	21,898	38.59%	New
Independent	G. Dhanagopal	2,796	4.93%	New
Margin of victory		10,148	17.89%	
Turnout		56,740	62.38%	
Registered electors		94,690		
DMK win (new seat)				
