= A. V. Abdul Naser =

Indian politician

A. V. Abdul Nasar was elected to the Tamil Nadu Legislative Assembly from the Bhuvanagiri constituency in the 1996 elections. He was a candidate of the Dravida Munnetra Kazhagam (DMK) party. He came from a Traditional Agricultural Family Ayangudi (Kattumannarkoil)

== Electoral performance ==
| Election | Constituency | Political party | Result | Vote % | Opposition | | | Ref |
| Election | Constituency | Political party | Result | Vote % | Candidate | Political party | Vote % | Ref |
|---|---|---|---|---|---|---|---|---|
| 1996 | Bhuvanagiri | DMK | Won | 43.80% | P. D. Elangovan | PMK | 26.67% | |
