= N. Rajangam =

Indian politician

- என். இராஜாங்கம்
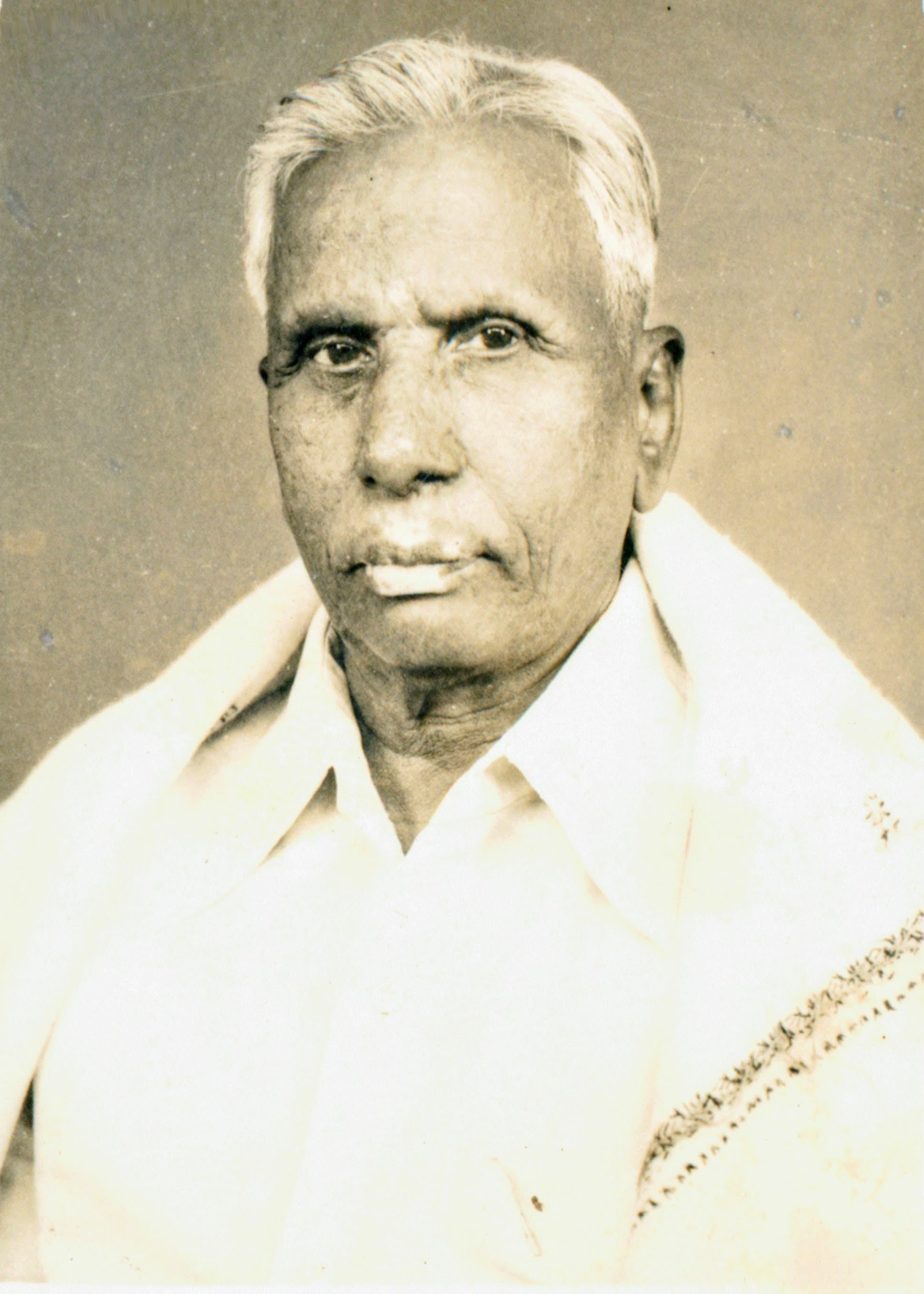
- Rajangam in circa 1982

Minister of Harijan Welfare (Tamil Nadu Government)
- In office 1974–1976

Member of Legislative Assembly
- In office 1962–1976
- Constituency: Kurinjipadi (state assembly constituency)

Member of Rajya Sabha from Tamil Nadu
- In office 1984–1990

Personal details
- Born: 1920-12-01 Karunguzhi, Cuddalore District, Tamil Nadu, INDIA
- Died: 2018-01-22 Cuddalore, Tamil Nadu, INDIA

N. Rajangam was an Indian politician and former Minister for Harijan Welfare (Tamil Nadu Government) and former Member of Parliament, Rajya Sabha.

Born in 1920 in the village of Karunguzhi in (then South Arcot District) Cuddalore district, Mr. Rajangam started in public life as a member and organizer in the Nandanar movement. In 1937, he was arrested for his participation in Anti-Hindi agitations of Tamil Nadu (Mozhi Por), a movement against the imposition of Hindi as a compulsory language. Mr. Rajangam started his professional life as the warden at Nandanar high school, Chidambaram.

He was elected to the Tamil Nadu legislative assembly from Kurinjipadi constituency as a Dravida Munnetra Kazhagam candidate in 1962, 1967, and 1971 elections. During his tenure, he was appointed the Minister of Harijan Welfare and was instrumental in the establishment of Tamil Nadu Harijan Housing and Development Corporation (THHADCO) in 1974. Later in 1984 he was elected to the Rajya Sabha as a Member of Parliament from Tamilnadu and served in various consultative committees in the department of Railways, Steel & Industries, Coal and Mines, etc.
