= V. Krishnamurthy Gounder =

Indian politician

Member of the Madras State Assembly
- In office 1962 - 1967; 1971 - 1976; 1980 - 1985
- Constituency: Nellikkuppam

Personal details
- Political party: Dravida Munnetra Kazhagam

V. Krishnamurthy Gounder was an Indian politician and former Member of the Legislative Assembly of Tamil Nadu. He was elected to the Tamil Nadu legislative assembly as a Dravida Munnetra Kazhagam candidate from Nellikuppam constituency in 1962, 1971 and 1980 elections.
