= S. Krishnamoorthy =

Indian politician

S. Krishnamoorthy is an Indian politician and former Member of the Legislative Assembly of Tamil Nadu. He is elected to the Tamil Nadu legislative assembly as a Dravida Munnetra Kazhagam candidate from Nellikuppam constituency in 1989 election. Previously he was elected to the Tamil Nadu legislative assembly as an Anna Dravida Munnetra Kazhagam candidate from Andimadam constituency in 1980 election he has called as nellikuppam krishnamoorthy by his followers and also he served as member of parliament in Rajya Sabha.
