= T. Velmurugan =

Indian politician

- தி.வேல்முருகன்
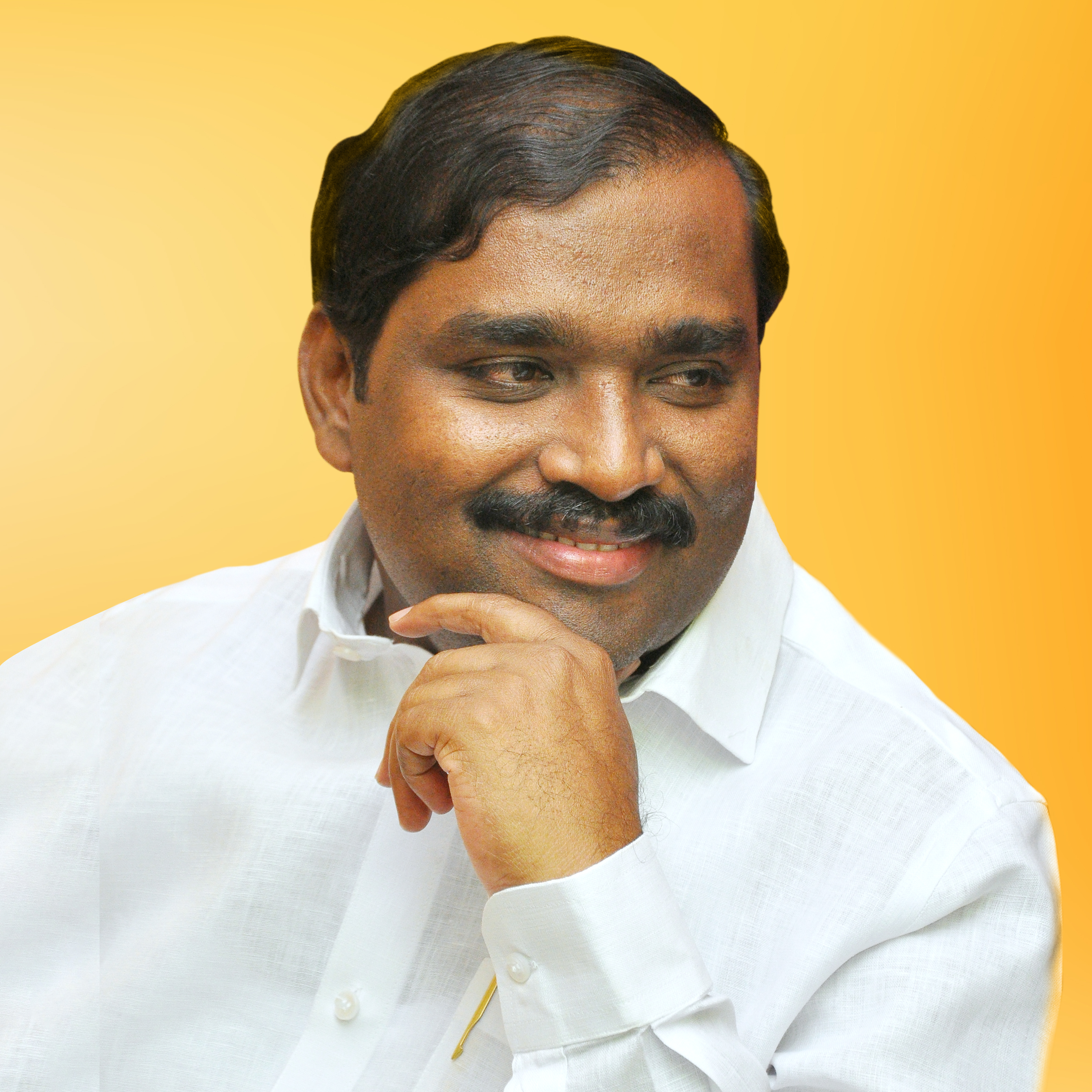

Member of the Tamil Nadu Legislative Assembly
- In office 2 May 2021 – 4 May 2026
- Preceded by: Sathya Panneerselvam
- Succeeded by: K. Mohan
- Constituency: Panruti
- In office 13 May 2001 – 13 May 2011
- Preceded by: V. Ramaswamy
- Succeeded by: P. Sivakozhundu
- Constituency: Panruti

Personal details
- Born: 11 April 1970 (age 56) Puliyur, Tamil Nadu, India
- Party: Tamizhaga Vazhvurimai Katchi (since 2012)
- Other political affiliations: Pattali Makkal Katchi (till 2012)
- Occupation: Politician
- Website: https://tvkparty.in/

T. Velmurugan is an Indian politician and Member of the Legislative Assembly of Tamil Nadu. He was elected to the Tamil Nadu Legislative Assembly as a Dravida Munnetra Kazhagam candidate from Panruti constituency in the 2021 elections. . He is the founder of Tamizhaga Vazhvurimai Katchi (TVMK) party.

== Early life ==
Velmurugan was born in 1970 in Puliyur Kattusagai village, Kurinchipadi circle, Cuddalore district as the fifth child of Thirunavukkarasu, Tanakkodi, in a farming family.

At age 15, he was inspired by the Tamil Nadu Liberation Force and attended their meetings and events. In 1987, the government attacked the Tamil Nadu Liberation Force, and Velmurugan and his family fled to Chennai.

== Politics ==
He entered politics as the Tiruvottiyur city secretary of the PMK.

He was fielded as the candidate of Thiruvettiyur in the assembly elections held on 24 June 1996 and became the State Youth Secretary.

After Panruti Ramachandran left the party, Velmurugan won the post of Unified Cuddalore District Secretary. He then became the candidate in Panruti Assembly elections in 2001, which he won, and was re-elected in 2006.

Velmurugan founded Tamizhaga Vazhvurimai Katchi, a Tamil Nadu political party. The Gangaikondan police registered a case against Velmurugan and 32 other TVK cadres after agitation organized by them against the upcoming unit of Pepsi at the SIPCOT Industrial Growth Centre in Gangaikondan on 27 October 2015.

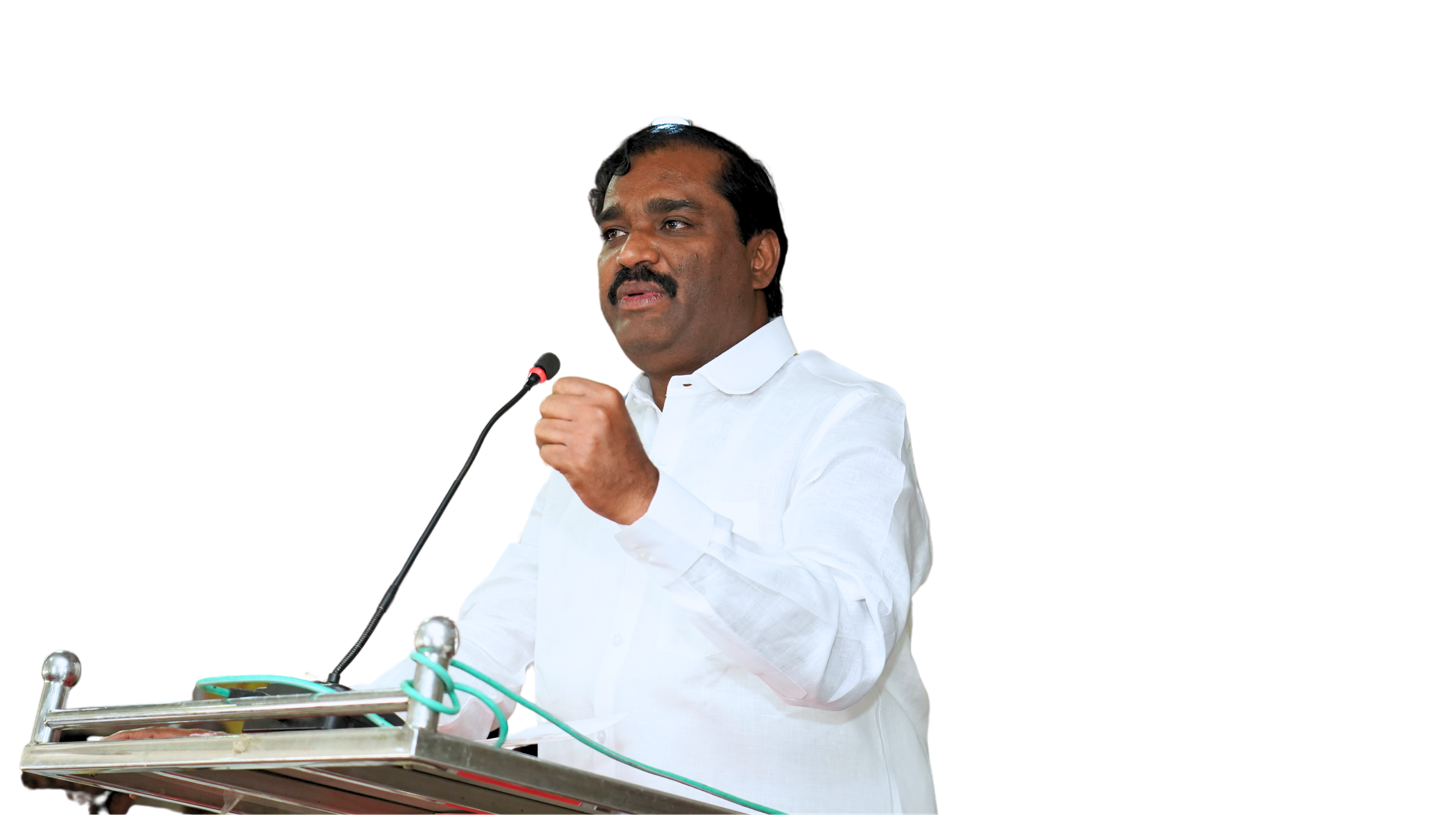

== Elections ==
Election	Party	Constituency	Result	Votes gained	%
1996 Tamilnadu Legislative Assembly Election	PMK	Thiruvottiyur	Lost	4,559	2.52%
2001 Tamilnadu Legislative Assembly Election	PMK	Panruti	Won	45,963	37.67%
2006 Tamilnadu Legislative Assembly Election	PMK	Panruti	Won	54,653	38.18
2011 Tamilnadu Legislative Assembly Election	PMK	Neyveli	Lost	61,431	44.72%
2016 Tamilnadu Legislative Assembly Election	TVK	Neyveli	Lost	30,523	19.17%
2021 Tamilnadu Legislative Assembly Election	DMK	Panruti	Won	93,801	47.6%

In 2026, Velmurugan led the Tamilaga Vazhvurimai Katchi to exit the DMK-led alliance ahead of the Tamil Nadu Legislative Assembly elections due to seat-sharing disagreements.
