= C. Govindarajan =

Indian politician and freedom fighter

C Govindarajan
- Born: 15 September 1921 cuddalore District, British India
- Died: 26 January 2008 (aged 86); Nellikuppam, Tamilnadu, India
- Education: Annamalai University, Chidambaram, Tamil Nadu
- Known for: Indian politician, Marxist
- Spouse: Shajati
- Children: Zareen Chumki Raj

C. Govindarajan (15 September 1921 – 26 January 2008) was a freedom fighter, Indian politician, and former Member of the Legislative Assembly of Tamil Nadu. He was one of the founder-members of the CPI(M) Tamilnadu, he worked for the growth of the party in the Unified South Arcot District. He had also served as the party State Committee member for a long time. He was elected to the Tamil Nadu legislative assembly as a Communist Party of India (Marxist) candidate from Nellikuppam constituency in 1967 and 1977 elections.
