= Bhuvanagiri Assembly constituency =

One of the 234 State Legislative Assembly Constituencies in Tamil Nadu, in India

Coordinates: 11.47°N 79.63°E

Bhuvanagiri
- Constituency No. 157 for the Tamil Nadu Legislative Assembly

Constituency details
- Country: India
- Region: South India
- State: Tamil Nadu
- District: Cuddalore
- Lok Sabha constituency: Chidambaram
- Established: 1951
- Total electors: 233,353
- Reservation: None

Member of Legislative Assembly
- 17th Tamil Nadu Legislative Assembly
- Incumbent A. Arunmozhithevan
- Party: AIADMK
- Alliance: NDA
- Elected year: 2026

Bhuvanagiri is a legislative assembly in Cuddalore district, which includes the city of Bhuvanagiri, Tamil Nadu. It is a part of Chidambaram Lok Sabha constituency. It is one of the 234 State Legislative Assembly Constituencies in Tamil Nadu, in India.

== Members of the Legislative Assembly ==
Election	Member	Party
1952	V. Krishnaswamy Padayachi	Indian National Congress
1957	Samikannu Pandayachi	Indian National Congress
1962	Ramachandra Rayar	Indian National Congress
1967	A. Govindarasan	Dravida Munnetra Kazhagam
1971	M. A. Abusali	Independent politician
1977	V. Raghuraman	Dravida Munnetra Kazhagam
1980	V. V. Swaminathan	All India Anna Dravida Munnetra Kazhagam
1984	V. V. Swaminathan	All India Anna Dravida Munnetra Kazhagam
1989	S. Sivalogam	Dravida Munnetra Kazhagam
1991	G. Malliga	All India Anna Dravida Munnetra Kazhagam
1996	A. V. Abdul Naser	Dravida Munnetra Kazhagam
2001	P. S. Arul	Independent politician
2006	Selvi Ramajayam	All India Anna Dravida Munnetra Kazhagam
2011	Selvi Ramajayam	All India Anna Dravida Munnetra Kazhagam
2016	K. Saravanan Durai	Dravida Munnetra Kazhagam
2021	A. Arunmozhithevan	All India Anna Dravida Munnetra Kazhagam
2026	A. Arunmozhithevan	All India Anna Dravida Munnetra Kazhagam

Madras State

== Election results ==
=== Assembly election 2026 ===
2026 Tamil Nadu Legislative Assembly election : Bhuvanagiri
Party	Candidate	Votes	%	±%
AIADMK	A. Arunmozhithevan	75,707	36.52%	New
DMK	K. Saravanan Durai	73,220	35.32%	▼9.65
TVK	T. Mahalingam	49,904	24.07%	New
NTK	S. Sumathi	5,105	2.46%	▼1.09
NOTA	None of the above	681	0.33%	▼0.21
Margin of victory		2,487	1.20%	▼3.01
Turnout		207,463	88.91%	▲9.51
Total valid votes		207,310		
Registered electors		233,353		▼6.14
AIADMK gain from AIADMK		Swing	▼12.66	

=== Assembly election 2021 ===
2021 Tamil Nadu Legislative Assembly election : Bhuvanagiri
Party	Candidate	Votes	%	±%
AIADMK	A. Arunmozhithevan	96,453	49.18%	▲20.33
DMK	K. Saravanan Durai	88,194	44.97%	▲13.24
NTK	R. Rathinavel	6,958	3.55%	▲2.98
AMMK	K. S. K. Balamurugan	2,470	1.26%	New
NOTA	None of the above	1,058	0.54%	▼0.05
Margin of victory		8,259	4.21%	▲1.33
Turnout		197,418	79.40%	▼0.52
Total valid votes		196,107		
Rejected ballots		253	0.13%	▲0.12
Registered electors		248,629		▲4.10
AIADMK gain from DMK		Swing	▲17.45	

=== Assembly election 2016 ===
2016 Tamil Nadu Legislative Assembly election : Bhuvanagiri
Party	Candidate	Votes	%	±%
DMK	K. Saravanan Durai	60,554	31.73%	New
AIADMK	Selvi Ramajayam	55,066	28.85%	▼22.49
PMK	Ashokkumar	33,681	17.65%	▼25.99
VCK	Sinthanai Selvan	33,662	17.64%	New
Independent	R. Marimuthu	1,345	0.70%	
NOTA	None of the above	1,132	0.59%	New
Margin of victory		5,488	2.88%	▼4.82
Turnout		190,882	79.92%	▼2.12
Total valid votes		190,854		
Rejected ballots		28	0.01%	
Registered electors		238,837		▲15.07
DMK gain from AIADMK		Swing	▼19.61	

=== Assembly election 2011 ===
2011 Tamil Nadu Legislative Assembly election : Bhuvanagiri
Party	Candidate	Votes	%	±%
AIADMK	Selvi Ramajayam	87,413	51.34%	▲0.10
PMK	T. Arivu Selvan	74,296	43.64%	▲3.99
Independent	K. Murugavel	2,511	1.47%	
JMM	A. Muthu	1,475	0.87%	New
LJP	R. Kamalakannan	1,189	0.70%	New
BSP	N. Samy	1,031	0.61%	▲0.25
Margin of victory		13,117	7.70%	▼3.90
Turnout		170,284	82.04%	▲5.86
Total valid votes		170,265		
Rejected ballots		19	0.01%	▲0.01
Registered electors		207,558		▲23.65
AIADMK hold		Swing		

=== Assembly election 2006 ===
2006 Tamil Nadu Legislative Assembly election : Bhuvanagiri
Party	Candidate	Votes	%	±%
AIADMK	Selvi Ramajayam	65,505	51.24%	New
PMK	K. Devadass	50,682	39.65%	New
DMDK	S. Shafiuddin	7,292	5.70%	New
BJP	S. Elumalai	1,237	0.97%	New
Margin of victory		14,823	11.60%	▲8.21
Turnout		127,867	76.18%	▲12.34
Total valid votes		127,834		
Registered electors		167,859		▼3.41
AIADMK gain from Independent		Swing	▲6.39	

=== Assembly election 2001 ===
2001 Tamil Nadu Legislative Assembly election : Bhuvanagiri
Party	Candidate	Votes	%	±%
Independent	P. S. Arul	49,753	44.85%	
Makkal Tamil Desam	M. Gopalakrishanan	45,989	41.46%	New
MDMK	A. N. Gunasekaran	4,247	3.83%	▲0.03
JD(S)	Z. Fazlur Rahaman	3,413	3.08%	New
Independent	A. P. Chidambara Naddan	1,802	1.62%	
BSP	A. Murugesan	1,217	1.10%	New
Independent	A. K. Veerasamy	1,155	1.04%	
Independent	R. Thirusangumurthy	813	0.73%	
Independent	C. S. Abdullah	774	0.70%	
Margin of victory		3,764	3.39%	▼13.74
Turnout		110,943	63.84%	▼8.42
Total valid votes		110,930		
Rejected ballots		13	0.01%	▼4.44
Registered electors		173,785		▲6.60
Independent gain from DMK		Swing	▲1.05	

=== Assembly election 1996 ===
1996 Tamil Nadu Legislative Assembly election : Bhuvanagiri
Party	Candidate	Votes	%	±%
DMK	A. V. Abdul Naser	49,457	43.80%	▲17.29
PMK	P. D. Elangovan	30,112	26.67%	▲0.18
AIADMK	P. M. Rasavel	27,904	24.71%	New
MDMK	D. Anbarasan	4,294	3.80%	New
Margin of victory		19,345	17.13%	▼2.74
Turnout		117,798	72.26%	▲0.60
Total valid votes		112,920		
Rejected ballots		5,243	4.45%	▲1.08
Registered electors		163,025		▲8.69
DMK gain from AIADMK		Swing	▼2.58	

=== Assembly election 1991 ===
1991 Tamil Nadu Legislative Assembly election : Bhuvanagiri
Party	Candidate	Votes	%	±%
AIADMK	G. Malliga	48,164	46.38%	New
DMK	R. T. Sabapathy Mohan	27,530	26.51%	▼19.99
PMK	P. D. Aruimozhi	27,511	26.49%	New
Margin of victory		20,634	19.87%	▼5.93
Turnout		107,472	71.66%	▲7.32
Total valid votes		103,853		
Rejected ballots		3,619	3.37%	▲1.16
Registered electors		149,984		▲11.28
AIADMK gain from DMK		Swing	▼0.12	

=== Assembly election 1989 ===
1989 Tamil Nadu Legislative Assembly election : Bhuvanagiri
Party	Candidate	Votes	%	±%
DMK	S. Sivalogam	39,430	46.50%	▲3.61
Independent	R. Rathakrishnan	17,553	20.70%	
AIADMK	V. V. Swaminathan	13,555	15.99%	New
AIADMK	K. Kalaimani	7,212	8.51%	New
INC	R. Sundaramurthy	6,247	7.37%	New
Margin of victory		21,877	25.80%	▲12.49
Turnout		86,712	64.34%	▼15.32
Total valid votes		84,795		
Rejected ballots		1,917	2.21%	▼2.77
Registered electors		134,779		▲10.42
DMK gain from AIADMK		Swing	▼9.70	

=== Assembly election 1984 ===
1984 Tamil Nadu Legislative Assembly election : Bhuvanagiri
Party	Candidate	Votes	%	±%
AIADMK	V. V. Swaminathan	51,922	56.20%	▲7.10
DMK	Durai Krishnamoorthy	39,621	42.89%	New
Independent	M. Kanagaraj	844	0.91%	
Margin of victory		12,301	13.31%	▲5.78
Turnout		97,234	79.66%	▲7.71
Total valid votes		92,387		
Rejected ballots		4,847	4.98%	▲3.58
Registered electors		122,059		▲3.18
AIADMK hold		Swing		

=== Assembly election 1980 ===
1980 Tamil Nadu Legislative Assembly election : Bhuvanagiri
Party	Candidate	Votes	%	±%
AIADMK	V. V. Swaminathan	41,207	49.10%	New
Independent	K. S. Asanudeen	34,883	41.56%	
JP	A. Nedunchezhiyan	6,647	7.92%	New
Independent	A. Satchidanandam	1,194	1.42%	
Margin of victory		6,324	7.53%	▲1.92
Turnout		85,123	71.95%	▲3.92
Total valid votes		83,931		
Rejected ballots		1,192	1.40%	▼0.31
Registered electors		118,301		▲3.58
AIADMK gain from DMK		Swing	▲20.77	

=== Assembly election 1977 ===
1977 Tamil Nadu Legislative Assembly election : Bhuvanagiri
Party	Candidate	Votes	%	±%
DMK	V. Raghuraman	21,638	28.33%	New
JP	T. M. D. Mahalingam	17,350	22.72%	New
INC	P. Balraj	17,282	22.63%	New
Independent	M. A. Abusali	14,870	19.47%	
Independent	V. Radhakrishnan	3,613	4.73%	
Independent	P. Arumugam	1,390	1.82%	
Margin of victory		4,288	5.61%	▼2.63
Turnout		77,698	68.03%	▼4.96
Total valid votes		76,369		
Rejected ballots		1,329	1.71%	▲1.71
Registered electors		114,210		▲17.60
DMK gain from Independent		Swing	▼15.98	

=== Assembly election 1971 ===
1971 Tamil Nadu Legislative Assembly election : Bhuvanagiri
Party	Candidate	Votes	%	±%
Independent	M. A. Abusali	28,615	44.31%	
INC	R. Balakrishnan	23,291	36.06%	New
Independent	K. Arumugam	9,962	15.42%	
Independent	C. Venkatakrishnan	1,618	2.51%	
Independent	P. Subrarayan	865	1.34%	
Margin of victory		5,324	8.24%	▼7.08
Turnout		70,886	72.99%	▼3.35
Total valid votes		64,585		
Registered electors		97,115		▲3.87
Independent gain from DMK		Swing	▼11.97	

=== Assembly election 1967 ===
1967 Madras State Legislative Assembly election : Bhuvanagiri
Party	Candidate	Votes	%	±%
DMK	A. Govindarasan	38,795	56.28%	▲14.90
INC	D. Ramachandran	28,234	40.96%	▼2.59
Independent	M. Chellappa	1,900	2.76%	
Margin of victory		10,561	15.32%	▲13.14
Turnout		71,376	76.34%	▲4.59
Total valid votes		68,929		
Registered electors		93,496		▼5.50
DMK gain from INC		Swing	▲12.73	

=== Assembly election 1962 ===
1962 Madras State Legislative Assembly election : Bhuvanagiri
Party	Candidate	Votes	%	±%
INC	Ramachandra Rayar	29,434	43.55%	▼5.73
DMK	Vaithilingam	27,964	41.38%	New
Independent	Venkatakrishna Naidu	5,982	8.85%	
SWA	Balakrishnan	3,358	4.97%	New
Independent	Pattusami	847	1.25%	
Margin of victory		1,470	2.18%	▼30.21
Turnout		70,987	71.75%	▲23.17
Total valid votes		67,585		
Registered electors		98,934		▲9.89
INC hold		Swing		

=== Assembly election 1957 ===
1957 Madras State Legislative Assembly election : Bhuvanagiri
Party	Candidate	Votes	%	±%
INC	Samikannu Pandayachi	21,553	49.28%	▲10.96
Independent	R. Balagurusamy	7,386	16.89%	
CPI	T. M. Somasundiram	7,099	16.23%	New
Independent	C. Govindarasu	5,668	12.96%	
Independent	Gandhi	2,029	4.64%	
Margin of victory		14,167	32.39%	▲29.76
Turnout		43,735	48.58%	▼9.63
Total valid votes		43,735		
Registered electors		90,032		▲46.48
INC hold		Swing		

=== Assembly election 1952 ===
1952 Madras State Legislative Assembly election : Bhuvanagiri
Party	Candidate	Votes	%	±%
INC	V. Krishnaswamy Padayachi	13,709	38.32%	New
TTP	S. Tiruvenkata Nainar	12,768	35.69%	New
Independent	V. Pattuswamisethuvaryar	2,591	7.24%	New
Independent	S. Paramananda Rayar	2,380	6.65%	New
Independent	S. Sundaramoorthy	2,319	6.48%	New
Socialist Party (India)	M. S. Zainulabuddin	2,011	5.62%	New
Margin of victory		941	2.63%	
Turnout		35,778	58.21%	
Total valid votes		35,778		
Registered electors		61,462		
INC win (new seat)				
