= Panruti S. Ramachandran =

Indian politician (born 1937)

Cabinet Minister Government of Tamil Nadu
- In office 30 June 1977 – 7 January 1988
- Minister: Public Works; Electricity; Iron & Steel
- Chief Minister: M. G. Ramachandran
- In office 15 March 1971 – 31 January 1976
- Minister: Transport
- Chief Minister: M. Karunanidhi

Deputy Leader of the Opposition in the Tamil Nadu Legislative Assembly
- In office 2011–2013
- Preceded by: O. Pannerselvam
- Succeeded by: Alagaapuram R. Mohanraj

Presidium Chairman of Desiya Murpokku Dravida Kazhagam
- In office 2005–2013
- President: Vijayakanth

Member of Tamil Nadu Legislative Assembly
- In office 1967–1989
- Constituency: Panruti
- In office 1991–1996
- Constituency: Panruti
- In office 2011–2014
- Constituency: Alandur

Personal details
- Born: 10 November 1937 (age 88) Panruti, Madras Presidency, British India
- Party: MGR Anna DMK (2026-present)
- Other political affiliations: AIADMK Thondar Urimai Meetpu Kuzhu (2022–2026); All India Anna Dravida Munnetra Kazhagam (2014–2022) (1977–1991); DMDK (2005–2013); Makkal Nalla Urimai Kazhagam (1997–2001); PMK (1991–1997); DMK (Till 1977)

Panruti Sankaradevan Ramachandran (born 10 November 1937) is an Indian politician and former Member of the Legislative Assembly (MLA) of Tamil Nadu.

He served as the party presidium chairman of DMDK till 2013.

== Early life and education ==
Ramachandran was born in a village named Puliyurkaattusaagai in Panruti taluk, Cuddalore District. He is the only son of Sankaradevan and Chinnapillai. He did his schooling in St. David High School at Cuddalore Old Town.

After SSLC, he joined Annamalai University for his PUC and later graduated in Electrical and Electronic Engineering (honours degree in B.E). Thereafter, he joined the Tamil Nadu Electricity Board as Assistant Engineer at Arni, North Arcot.

== Politics ==
Ramachandran was the Dravida Munnetra Kazhagam (DMK) student secretary while at Annamalai University. As a secretary, he organised DMK meetings at Arignar Anna would be the prime speaker. Anna was impressed by Ramachandran's government of Tamil Nadu he used to speak as Sampath in DMK public meetings. He named his son as Sampath after his pen name.

He started his political career as a DMK member. He was the Minister for Transport of Tamil Nadu during 1971–77. He later joined Anna Dravida Munnetra Kazhagam (ADMK). He has won six assembly elections contesting from Panruti constituency.

He was elected to the Tamil Nadu legislative assembly from Panruti constituency as a Dravida Munnetra Kazhagam candidate in 1967, and 1971 elections as an Anna Dravida Munnetra Kazhagam candidate in 1977, 1980, and 1984 elections and as a Pattali Makkal Katchi candidate in 1991 election. Karunanidhi claimed in two separate interviews, in April 2009 and in May 2012, that Ramachandran was ready for the merger of his party, AIADMK, with the DMK in September 1979, with Biju Patnaik acting as the mediator. However, the plan failed to materialise as Panruti S. Ramachandran, a close confidante of Ramachandran, acted as a spoiler and Ramachandran later changed his mind.

The chairman of the Desiya Murpokku Dravida Kazhagam presidium and Deputy Leader of the Opposition in the Tamil Nadu Legislative Assembly, Ramachandran on 10 December 2013 announced retirement from active politics. In his letter addressed to DMDK founder-president Vijayakanth, he stated that he had taken the decision as he had been maintaining indifferent health and his doctor had advised him to take rest. He resigned from the DMDK and in February 2014 he joined the All India Anna Dravida Munnetra Kazhagam party. He blamed the abnormal distance formed between the DMDK and him. After that he spoke in many Constituencies for the AIADMK Victory in 16th Lok Sahba Election. In 2005 he received Periyar Award and in 2013, the Tamil Nadu government honoured him with Arignar Anna Award.

== Electoral career ==
=== Tamil Nadu Legislative Assembly Elections Contested ===
Elections	Constituency	Party	Result	Vote percentage	Opposition Candidate	Opposition Party	Opposition vote percentage
1967 Madras State Legislative Assembly election	Panruti	DMK	Won	60.82	S. V. Vadivelu Padayachi	INC	39.18
1971 Tamil Nadu Legislative Assembly election	Panruti	DMK	Won	52.06	S. V. Vadivelu Padayachi	INC	40.96
1977 Tamil Nadu Legislative Assembly election	Panruti	AIADMK	Won	59.24	K. Nandagopala Krishnan	JP	37.83
1980 Tamil Nadu Legislative Assembly election	Panruti	AIADMK	Won	51.88	K. Nandagopala Krishnan	DMK	46.65
1984 Tamil Nadu Legislative Assembly election	Panruti	AIADMK	Won	53.97	K. Nandagopala Krishnan	DMK	46.03
1991 Tamil Nadu Legislative Assembly election	Panruti	PMK	Won	37.51	R. M. Devasudaram	AIADMK	36.45
2001 Tamil Nadu Legislative Assembly election	Panruti	Independent	Lost	38.08	T. Velmurugan	PMK	38.18
2006 Tamil Nadu Legislative Assembly election	Panruti	DMDK	Lost	12.7	T. Velmurugan	PMK	24.27
2011 Tamil Nadu Legislative Assembly election	Alandur	DMDK	Won	45.52	Dr. K. Ghayathri Devi	INC	42.10
2016 Tamil Nadu Legislative Assembly election	Alandur	AIADMK	Lost	35.81	T. M. Anbarasan	DMK	44.64
