= V. Ramaswamy =

Indian politician

V. Ramaswamy was elected to the Tamil Nadu Legislative Assembly from the Panruti constituency in the 1996 elections. He was a candidate of the Dravida Munnetra Kazhagam (DMK) party.
