= C. Shanmugam =

Indian politician

C. Shanmugam is an Indian politician and was a Member of the Legislative Assembly (MLA) of Tamil Nadu. He was elected to the Tamil Nadu legislative assembly as a Dravida Munnetra Kazhagam (DMK) candidate from Alandur constituency in the 1989 and 1996 elections.

Shanmugam - together with his wife and son - was among several DMK legislators charged by Tamil Nadu Police in June 2005 of having assets disproportionate to their known income.
