= A. Mani (Nellikuppam MLA) =

Indian politician

A. Mani (died 11 July 1996) was elected to the Tamil Nadu Legislative Assembly from the Nellikuppam constituency in the 1996 elections. He was a candidate of the Dravida Munnetra Kazhagam (DMK) party.

Mani died on 11 July 1996.
