= Neyveli Assembly constituency =

One of the 234 Legislative Assembly Constituencies in Tamil Nadu

Coordinates: 11.54°N 79.48°E

Neyveli
- Constituency No. 153 for the Tamil Nadu Legislative Assembly

Constituency details
- Country: India
- Region: South India
- State: Tamil Nadu
- District: Cuddalore
- Lok Sabha constituency: Cuddalore
- Established: 2008
- Total electors: 191,337
- Reservation: None

Member of Legislative Assembly
- 17th Tamil Nadu Legislative Assembly
- Incumbent R. Rajendran
- Party: AIADMK
- Alliance: NDA
- Elected year: 2026

Neyveli is a state assembly constituency in Tamil Nadu, India, newly formed after Mangalore Assembly constituency was abolished in delimitations in 2008. It is included in Cuddalore Lok Sabha constituency. It is one of the 234 State Legislative Assembly Constituencies in Tamil Nadu.

== Members of Legislative Assembly ==
Year	Winner	Party
2011	M. P. S. Sivasubramaniyan	All India Anna Dravida Munnetra Kazhagam
2016	Saba Rajendran	Dravida Munnetra Kazhagam
2021	Saba Rajendran	Dravida Munnetra Kazhagam
2026	Rajendran.R	All India Anna Dravida Munnetra Kazhagam

== Electorate ==
	Electors				Voters	
Election	Men	Women	Others	Total	Total	Percentage
2011	85,505	80,594	0	1,66,099	137411	82.73%
2016	1,01,533	99,499	8	2,01,040	159370	79.27%
2021	1,09,315	1,09,332	19	2,18,666	164458	75.21%

== Election results ==
Vote share of winning candidates
2026	37.76%
2021	45.80%
2016	34.10%
2011	50.63%

=== 2026 ===
2026 Tamil Nadu Legislative Assembly election: Neyveli
Party	Candidate	Votes	%	±%
AIADMK	Rajendran.R	63,731	37.76	New
DMK	Saba.Rajendran	52,769	31.26	▼14.54
TVK	Anand.K	34,291	20.32	New
TVK	Thirumalvalavan.T	11,381	6.74	New
NTK	Veeramani.B	4,444	2.63	▼2.11
NOTA	NOTA	768	0.46	▼0.25
Independent	Karthikeyan.C.M	459	0.27	New
Independent	Manimaran.P	347	0.21	New
Independent	Chezhiyan.G	221	0.13	New
Veerath Thiyagi Viswanathadoss Thozhilalarkal Katchi	Mayakrishnan.K	136	0.08	New
BSP	Jothimurugan.V	131	0.08	New
Independent	Sathiyaseelan.M	102	0.06	New
Margin of victory		10,962	6.50	▲5.90
Turnout		1,68,780	88.21	▲13.13
Registered electors		1,91,337		▼27,266
AIADMK gain from DMK		Swing	▲37.76	

=== 2021 ===
2021 Tamil Nadu Legislative Assembly election: Neyveli
Party	Candidate	Votes	%	±%
DMK	Saba Rajendran	75,177	45.80%	+11.7
PMK	K. Jagan	74,200	45.21%	+32.81
NTK	K. Ramesh	7,785	4.74%	+3.77
AMMK	R. Baktharatchagan	2,230	1.36%	New
NOTA	NOTA	1,171	0.71%	−0.36
IJK	R. Ilangovan	1,011	0.62%	New
Margin of victory		977	0.60%	−10.58%
Turnout		164,130	75.08%	−4.13%
Rejected ballots		328	0.20%	
Registered electors		218,603		
DMK hold		Swing	11.70%	

=== 2016 ===
2016 Tamil Nadu Legislative Assembly election: Neyveli
Party	Candidate	Votes	%	±%
DMK	Saba Rajendran	54,299	34.10%	New
AIADMK	R. Rajsekar	36,508	22.93%	−27.71
TVMK	T. Velmurugan	30,528	19.17%	New
PMK	K. Jagan	19,749	12.40%	−32.32
CPI(M)	T. Arumugman	12,674	7.96%	New
NOTA	NOTA	1,710	1.07%	New
NTK	B. Kalaiselvan	1,557	0.98%	New
Margin of victory		17,791	11.17%	5.26%
Turnout		159,241	79.21%	−3.49%
Registered electors		201,040		
DMK gain from AIADMK		Swing	-16.54%	

=== 2011 ===
2011 Tamil Nadu Legislative Assembly election: Neyveli
Party	Candidate	Votes	%	±%
AIADMK	M. P. S. Sivasubramaniyan	69,549	50.63%	New
PMK	T. Velmurugan	61,431	44.72%	New
BJP	M. Karpagam	1,406	1.02%	New
Independent	S. Pandian	1,273	0.93%	New
Loktantrik Samajwadi	P. Lily	1,232	0.90%	New
IJK	P. Kumar	971	0.71%	New
LJP	S. Elangovan	576	0.42%	New
SUCI(C)	P. Chandra	478	0.32%	New
Independent	V.K Kumaraguru	441	0.35%	New
Margin of victory		8,118	5.91%	
Turnout		1,37,357	82.70%	
Registered electors		1,66,099		
AIADMK win (new seat)				
