= KMK =

KMK may refer to

- Kongunadu Munnetra Kazhagam, a political party in the Indian state of Tamil Nadu
- Kottonmouth Kings, an American rap rock band
- Kultusministerkonferenz, a German state conference
- Makabana Airport, in the Republic of the Congo, which has that IATA airport code
