= M. P. S. Sivasubramaniyan =

Indian politician

M. P. S. Sivasubramaniyan is an Indian politician and was member of the Tamil Nadu Legislative Assembly from the Neyveli constituency during 2011–16. He represents the Anna Dravida Munnetra Kazhagam party.

== Electoral Performance ==
=== Tamil Nadu Legislative elections ===
Elections	Constituency	Party	Result	Vote Percentage
2011 Tamil Nadu Legislative Assembly election	Neyveli	AIADMK	Won	50.63
