= R. Rajendran (AIADMK politician) =

Indian politician

Sorathur R. Rajendran

Member of the Tamil Nadu Legislative Assembly
- Incumbent
- Assumed office 11 May 2026
- Preceded by: Saba. Rajendran
- Constituency: Neyveli
- In office 16 May 2011 – 19 May 2016
- Preceded by: M. R. K. Panneerselvam
- Succeeded by: M. R. K. Panneerselvam
- Constituency: Kurinjipadi

Personal details
- Party: All India Anna Dravida Munnetra Kazhagam

R. Rajendran is an Indian politician and was a member of the Tamil Nadu Legislative Assembly from the Kurinjipadi constituency. He represents the All India Anna Dravida Munnetra Kazhagam party.
