= People's Council of West Kurdistan =

The People's Council of West Kurdistan (Kurdish: Meclîsa Gel a Rojavayê Kurdistanê, MGRK), is one of the main overarching coordinating (i.e. "governing") bodies of Rojava Syria. It is a directly democratic "people's" council founded by various Syrian Kurdish political groups including the Democratic Union Party (PYD), in 2011.

The MGRK body consists of delegates (Coordinating Chairs) elected by lower neighborhood councils.

The MGRK plays a significant role in the Syrian Kurdistan campaign leading to the de facto autonomous Kurdish region of Rojava. It is currently co-chaired by Sinem Mihemed and Abdulselam Ahmed who are also delegates to the Kurdish Supreme Committee.

The MGRK comprises the following groups:

- Democratic Union Party (Syria) (PYD)
- Movement for a Democratic Society (TEV-DEM)
- Star Union of Women (Yekîtiya Star)
- Organization of families of martyrs
- Organization of the Kurdish language (SZK)
- Organization of revolutionist Youth of West Kurdistan (KCRK)
- Other groups

== See also ==
- Syrian Kurdistan
- Kobanî
- Movement for a Democratic Society
