= M. R. K. Panneerselvam =

Indian politician

Cabinet Minister Government of Tamil Nadu
- In office 7 May 2021 – 5 May 2026
- Minister: Agriculture; Agricultural Engineering; Agro Service Co-operatives; Horticulture; Sugarcane Excise; Sugarcane Development; Waste Land Development
- Chief Minister: M. K. Stalin

Minister for Health and Family Welfare Government of Tamil Nadu
- In office 13 May 2006 – 15 May 2011
- Chief Minister: M. Karunanidhi

Minister for Backward Classes Government of Tamil Nadu
- In office 13 May 1996 – 13 May 2001
- Chief Minister: M. Karunanidhi

Member of the Tamil Nadu Legislative Assembly for Kurinjipadi constituency
- Incumbent
- Assumed office 19 May 2016
- In office 10 May 1996 – 14 May 2011

Personal details
- Born: 25 August 1957 (age 69) Muttam, Kattumannarkoil
- Party: Dravida Munnetra Kazhagam
- Children: 3
- Occupation: Politician

M. R. K. Panneerselvam is an Indian Politician and Department of Agriculture Government of Tamilnadu and he has been the Minister for Health in the state of Tamil Nadu during the period from 2006 to 2011, Minister for Backward Classes during 1996. He was born in Muttam and has a bachelor's degree in Law (The Tamil Nadu Dr.Ambedkar Law University).

Panneerselvam has been elected to the Tamil Nadu Legislative Assembly on five occasions from the Kurinjipadi constituency as a candidate of the Dravida Munnetra Kazhagam party. These were in the elections of 1996, 2001, 2006, 2016 and 2021.

== Agriculture Minister ==
As promised in the DMK election manifesto, a separate Agriculture Budget for the state was presented on 14 August 2021. MRK Panneerselvam, the minister for agriculture and farmer’s welfare, presented the budget and said that it was in line with the views of farmers and experts, whose opinions were sought before preparing it.

Minister for Agriculture and Farmer’s Welfare MRK Pannerselvam began the presentation by dedicating the budget to those farmers who are protesting at New Delhi against the farm laws.

== Electoral performance ==
=== Tamil Nadu Legislative elections ===
| Elections | Constituency | Party | Result | Vote Percentage |
|---|---|---|---|---|
| 1991 Tamil Nadu Legislative Assembly election | Chidambaram | DMK | Lost | 30.57% |
| 1996 Tamil Nadu Legislative Assembly election | Kurinjipadi | DMK | Won | 54.99% |
| 2001 Tamil Nadu Legislative Assembly election | Kurinjipadi | DMK | Won | 55.78% |
| 2006 Tamil Nadu Legislative Assembly election | Kurinjipadi | DMK | Won | 45.64% |
| 2011 Tamil Nadu Legislative Assembly election | Kurinjipadi | DMK | Lost | 41.16% |
| 2016 Tamil Nadu Legislative Assembly election | Kurinjipadi | DMK | Won | 44.03% |
| 2021 Tamil Nadu Legislative Assembly election | Kurinjipadi | DMK | Won | 51.05% |
| 2026 Tamil Nadu Legislative Assembly election | Kurinjipadi | DMK | Won | 35.84% |
