= T. M. Anbarasan =

Indian politician (born 1960)

Cabinet Minister Government of Tamil Nadu
- In office 7 May 2021 – 5 May 2026
- Minister: Minister of Rural Industries, Cottage Industries, Small Industries, Tamil Nadu Urban Habitat Development Board.
- Chief Minister: M. K. Stalin
- In office 12 May 2006 – 14 May 2011
- Minister: Minister for Labour Development
- Chief Minister: M. Karunanidhi

Member of the Tamil Nadu Legislative Assembly for Alandur constituency
- In office 12 May 2006 – 14 May 2011
- In office 19 May 2016 – 4 May 2026

Personal details
- Born: 21 April 1960 (age 66) Kundrathur, Tamil Nadu
- Party: Dravida Munnetra Kazhagam
- Spouse: A. Tamilselvi
- Children: 1 son, 1 daughter
- Occupation: Politician

T. Mohalingam Anbarasan is an Indian politician. He is the former minister for Rural Industries, Cottage Industries, Small Industries, Slum clearance board in the Indian state of Tamil Nadu Government. He is district DMK secretary of Kancheepuram. He had been elected to the Tamil Nadu assembly thrice.

== Early life ==
Tha Mo Anbarasan was born to Textile merchant Tha. Mohalingam Sengundha Mudaliar in Kundrathur on 21 April 1960. He had finished PUC education. At his school days he joined DMK party and started his political career.

== Political career ==
He defeated B. Valarmathi of AIADMK during the 2006 assembly election in Alandur constituency.

The elections of 2016 resulted in him winning the Alandur constituency again.

== Electoral performance ==
2021 Tamil Nadu Legislative Assembly election : Alandur
Party	Candidate	Votes	%	±%
DMK	T. M. Anbarasan	116,785	49.52	▲4.88
AIADMK	B. Valarmathi	76,214	32.32	▼3.49
MNM	Sarathbabu	21,139	8.96	New
NTK	Dr. R. Karthikeyan	16,522	7.01	▲5.20
NOTA	None of the above	1,908	0.81	▼1.37
SDPI	M. Mohammed Thameem Ansari	1,770	0.75	New
Margin of victory		40,571	17.20	▲8.37
Turnout		238,072	61.18	▼0.57
Total valid votes		235,843		
Rejected ballots		321	0.13	▲0.12
Registered electors		389,118		▲10.71
DMK hold		Swing		

2016 Tamil Nadu Legislative Assembly election : Alandur
Party	Candidate	Votes	%	±%
DMK	T. M. Anbarasan	96,877	44.64	▲9.56
AIADMK	Panruti S. Ramachandran	77,708	35.81	▼8.57
BJP	Dr. S. Sathyanarayanan	12,806	5.90	New
DMDK	U. Chandran	12,291	5.66	▼4.50
PMK	R. Srinivasan	7,194	3.32	New
NOTA	None of the above	4,727	2.18	▲0.07
NTK	Dhanachezhian	3,927	1.81	New
Margin of victory		19,169	8.83	▼0.47
Turnout		217,027	61.75	▼2.52
Total valid votes		216,997		
Rejected ballots		30	0.01	▼2.12
Registered electors		351,470		▲12.24
DMK gain from AIADMK		Swing	▲0.26	

2011 Tamil Nadu Legislative Assembly election: Pallavaram
Party	Candidate	Votes	%	±%
AIADMK	P. Dhansingh	105,631	52.70	New
DMK	T. M. Anbarasan	88,257	44.03	New
Loktantrik Samajwadi	R. Kumar	1,082	0.54	New
BSP	B. Rajappa	1,074	0.54	New
IJK	R. Samesudoss	1,052	0.52	New
Margin of victory		17,374	8.67	
Turnout		277,671	72.19	
Registered electors		200,455		
AIADMK win (new seat)				

2006 Tamil Nadu Legislative Assembly election : Alandur
Party	Candidate	Votes	%	±%
DMK	T. M. Anbarasan	133,232	46.85	New
AIADMK	B. Valarmathi	115,322	40.55	New
DMDK	R. Vijayakumar	22,866	8.04	New
BJP	H. Raja	9,298	3.27	New
Margin of victory		17,910	6.30	▼0.04
Turnout		284,421	65.85	▲18.89
Total valid votes		284,403		
Registered electors		431,953		▲2.07
DMK gain from AIADMK		Swing	▼0.74	
