= P. Sivakozhundu =

Indian politician

P.Sivakozhundu is an Indian politician and former member of the Tamil Nadu Legislative Assembly from the Panruti constituency. He represented the Desiya Murpokku Dravida Kazhagam party.
