= Vadakadu =

- city
- Location in Tamil Nadu, India Vadakadu (India)
- Coordinates: 10.341771°N 79.060879°E
- Country: India
- State: Tamil Nadu
- District: Pudukkottai

Government
  - President: S Manikandan BE

Area
  - Total: 1,250 km^{2} (480 sq mi)
- Elevation: 79 m (259 ft)

Population (2004)
  - Total: 8,742
  - Density: 100/km^{2} (260/sq mi)

Languages
  - Official: Tamil
- Time zone: UTC+5:30 (IST)
- PIN: 622304
- Telephone code: 04322-253***
- Sex ratio: 50% ♂/♀
- Website: www.vadakadu.blogspot.com

Vadakadu is one of the largest villages in Alangudi, Tamil Nadu, India.

Mariamman Temple is a Hindu temple in the village. The temple's annual festival falls in May as well as Sithirai.

People are mostly engaged in agriculture.

== Geography ==
Vadakadu is located at 10.341771°N 79.060879°E

- This town lies near Alangudi, a town in Pudukkottai district, Tamil Nadu, India.
- This area mostly consists of red soil.

== Demographics ==
Nearby villages are Pullanviduthi, Avanam

== Protest ==
- This is a place where the protests intensified for the hydrocarbon fracking to mine gas decision from the central government of India where people of Neduvasal are agitating against decision of the Government as it can pollute water and land here used for agriculture.

== Economy ==
- This area is mainly depends on agriculture.
- It's plux board are quality and high quality vinyl banners.

== Tourism ==
- Sri muthumariyamman kovil

== Schools ==
- Thangam matriculation school, Vadakadu
- Lions matriculation school, Mangadu
- Government hr. sec school, Vadakadu
- 1 government middle school and 5 primary school among different streets
- ThaiTamil school, Vadakadu
- Mercy School, Vadakadu

== Banks ==
- UCO Bank
- PCC Bank

== Nearest villages ==
- Keeramangalam
- Mangadu
- Avanam
- Kothamangalam
- Pullanviduthi

== Entertainment ==
- Kabaddi, frequently arranged kabaddi matches
- Cricket, cricket matches held annually from April to June
- Volleyball, many volleyball players around this area with state level matches held here

== Notable people ==
- A.Venkatachalam, [1984, 1996 and 2001], during this time, he was also the Minister for Tourism in Chief Minister J. Jayalalitha's cabinet.
- T. Pushparaju, Indian National Congress candidate from Alangudi constituency in 1977 election and from Thirumayam constituency in 1984 election. District President Thirumayam constituency Pudukkottai Congress Committee in 15 year continue.
