= S. Shanmuganathan =

S. Shanmuganathan may refer to:

- S. Shanmuganathan (Indian politician)
- S. Shanmuganathan (Sri Lankan politician)
