= Pullanviduthi =

Village in India

- Village
- Location in Tamil Nadu, India Pullanviduthi (India)
- Coordinates: 10.359°N 79.088°E
- Country: India
- State: Tamil Nadu
- District: Pudukkottai

Government
  - President: Valli Alagar

Area
  - Total: 1,250 km^{2} (480 sq mi)
- Elevation: 79 m (259 ft)

Population (2004)
  - Total: 8,742
  - Density: 100/km^{2} (260/sq mi)

Languages
  - Official: Tamil
- Time zone: UTC+5:30 (IST)
- PIN: 622304
- Telephone code: 04322-251***
- Sex ratio: 50% ♂/♀

Pullanviduthi is a village in Alangudi, Tamil Nadu, India.

The majority of its population works in the agriculture industry.

== Geography ==
Pullanviduthi lies near Vadakadu, in an area consisting mostly of red soil.

== Economy ==
The primary exports of Pullanviduthi are crops and dairy products.

== Nearest villages and towns ==
- Vadakadu
- Peravurani
- Avanam
- Neduvasal

== Nearest railway stations ==
- Peravurani railway station
- Thanjavur railway station
