= K. Dhanushkodi Thevar =

Indian politician

K. Dhanushkodi Thevar was an Indian politician and former Member of the Legislative Assembly of Tamil Nadu. He was elected to the Tamil Nadu legislative assembly as an Anna Dravida Munnetra Kazhagam candidate from Rajapalayam constituency in 1977 election and as an Independent candidate from Mudukulathur constituency in 1980 election.
