= Neduvasal =

Village in India

- village
- Location in Tamil Nadu, India Neduvasal (India)
- Coordinates: 10.355159°N 79.133706°E
- Country: India
- State: Tamil Nadu
- District: Pudukkottai

Area
  - Total: 45 km^{2} (17 sq mi)

Population (2006)
  - Total: 5,030
  - Density: 110/km^{2} (290/sq mi)

Languages
  - Official: Tamil
- Time zone: UTC+5:30 (IST)
- PIN: 622 304
- Telephone code: 04371

Neduvasal is a village in Pudukkottai district, Tamil Nadu, India.

== Demographics ==
As per the 2006 census, Neduvasal had a total population of 5030 with 2650 males and 2380 females.

== Protest ==
- This is a place where the protests intensified for the Hydrocarbon fracking to mine gas decision from the central govt of India where people of Neduvasal are Agitating against decision of the Government as it can pollute water and land here used for Agriculture'

== Attractions ==
The villages around Neduvasal are covered with picturesque coconut plantations. The town is home to the Lord Sri Nadiamman Temple, the Lord Padrakaliyamman Temple, and the Thiruvalluvar Temple.

Manora, 30 km east of Neduvasal, is an eight-story tower built by the Maratha King Serfoji II in 1814 to commemorate the victory of the British over Napoleon Bonaparte at Waterloo. From the top of the tower there is a panoramic view of the palm-fringed Bay of Bengal. The tower has also served as a lighthouse.

This is a place where the protests intensified for the Hydrocarbon fracking to mine gas decision from the central govt of India where people of Neduvasal are Agitating against decision of the Government as it can pollute water and land here used for Agriculture.

== Surrounding villages ==
The town is surrounded by a cluster of 15 villages:

- Karambakudi
- Peravurani
- Pattukottai
- Pullanviduthi
- Aranthangi
- Avanam
- Thiruchitrambalam
- Thennangudi
- Vadakadu
- Karukkagurichi
- Vembangudi/Paingal
- Kalathur
- Veeriyankottai
- Kuruvikarambai
- Nadiyam
- Thuraiyur
- Mudapulikadu (Peravurani)
- Andakottai

== Schools and colleges near Neduvasal ==
- M. S. Swaminathan Research Foundation, Neduvasal
- Govt. Higher Secondary School, Neduvasal
- Panchayat Union Primary School, Anna Nagar Neduvasal
- Govt. Higher Secondary School, Avanam
- Dr. Abdulkalam Polytechnic College, Avanam
- Sri Venkateswara College of Arts & Science, Peravurani
- Muvendar Matriculation Higher Secondary School, Peravurani
- Dr. J. C. Kumarappa Centenary Vidya Mandir Matric Higher Secondary School
- V. R. Veerappa Higher Secondary School, Peravurani
- Govt. Boys Higher Secondary School, Andavan kovil, Peravurani
- Govt. Girls Higher Secondary School, Pookollai, Peravurani
- Atlantic's International School Kuruvikarambai-Peravurani.
- Sri Venkateshwara CBSE School Peravurani.
- SMR East Coast Engineering College Peravurani TK
- Government Arts and Science College-Peravurani.
