= S. Rajasekaran =

Indian politician

S. Rajasekaran is an Indian politician and incumbent Member of the Legislative Assembly of Tamil Nadu. He was elected to the Tamil Nadu legislative assembly as a Communist Party of India candidate from Alangudi constituency in 2006 election.
