= M. Chandra (Rajapalayam MLA) =

Indian politician

M. Chandra is an Indian politician and has been a Member of the Legislative Assembly of Tamil Nadu. She was elected to the Tamil Nadu legislative assembly as an Anna Dravida Munnetra Kazhagam candidate from Rajapalayam constituency in 2006 election.

She converted to Hinduism in 1994 under the guidance of Arya Samaj. Her father was a Christian and her mother a Hindu.
