= K. B. V. Sc. Chandrasekaran =

Indian politician

K. Chandrasekaran is an Indian politician, Secretary of Pudukkottai district MDMK party and incumbent Member of the Legislative Assembly of Tamil Nadu. He was elected to the Tamil Nadu legislative assembly as a Dravida Munnetra Kazhagam candidate from Alangudi constituency in 1989 election. He also became the minister for animal husbandry during that period. He was a veterinary physician before he became the minister. He is now contesting in Alangudi constituency for the Tamil Nadu elections-2016 for Makkal Nala Koottani, also known as the People's Welfare Front.
