= V. P. Rajan =

Indian politician

V. P. Rajan is an Indian politician and former Member of the Legislative Assembly of Tamil Nadu. He was elected to the Tamil Nadu legislative assembly as a Dravida Munnetra Kazhagam (DMK) candidate from Rajapalayam constituency in the 1989 and 1996 elections. The constituency was reserved for candidates from the Scheduled Castes.
