= 1980 Tamil Nadu Legislative Assembly election =

Indian election

- 28 May 1980

All 234 seats in the Legislature of Tamil Nadu 118 seats needed for a majority
- Turnout: 65.42% (▲3.84%)
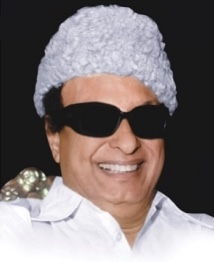

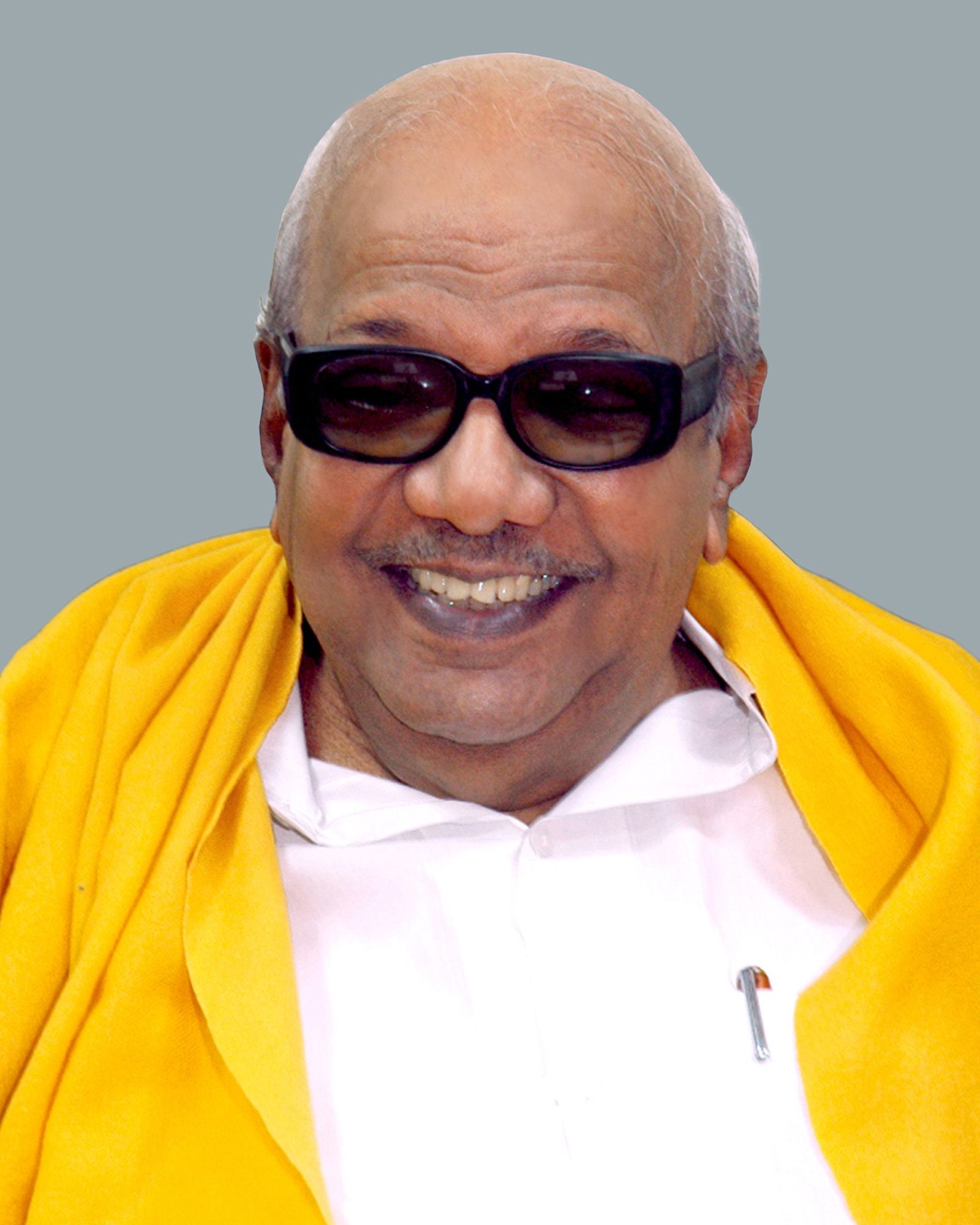
	First party	Second party
Leader	M. G. Ramachandran	M. Karunanidhi (Note: In fact Congress contested more constituencies than DMK but Indira Gandhi announced that M. Karunanidhi is the Chief Ministrial Candidate for the 1980 election.)
Party	AIADMK	DMK
Alliance	AIADMK Alliance+LF	INC+
Leader's seat	Madurai West	Anna Nagar
Seats won	129	37
Seat change	▼1	▼11
Popular vote	7,303,010	4,164,389
Percentage	38.8%	22.1%
Swing	▲8.4%	▼2.8%
Alliance seats	162	69
Alliance seat change	▲18	▼6
Alliance popular vote	93,28,839	83,71,718
Alliance percentage	48.9%	44.4%
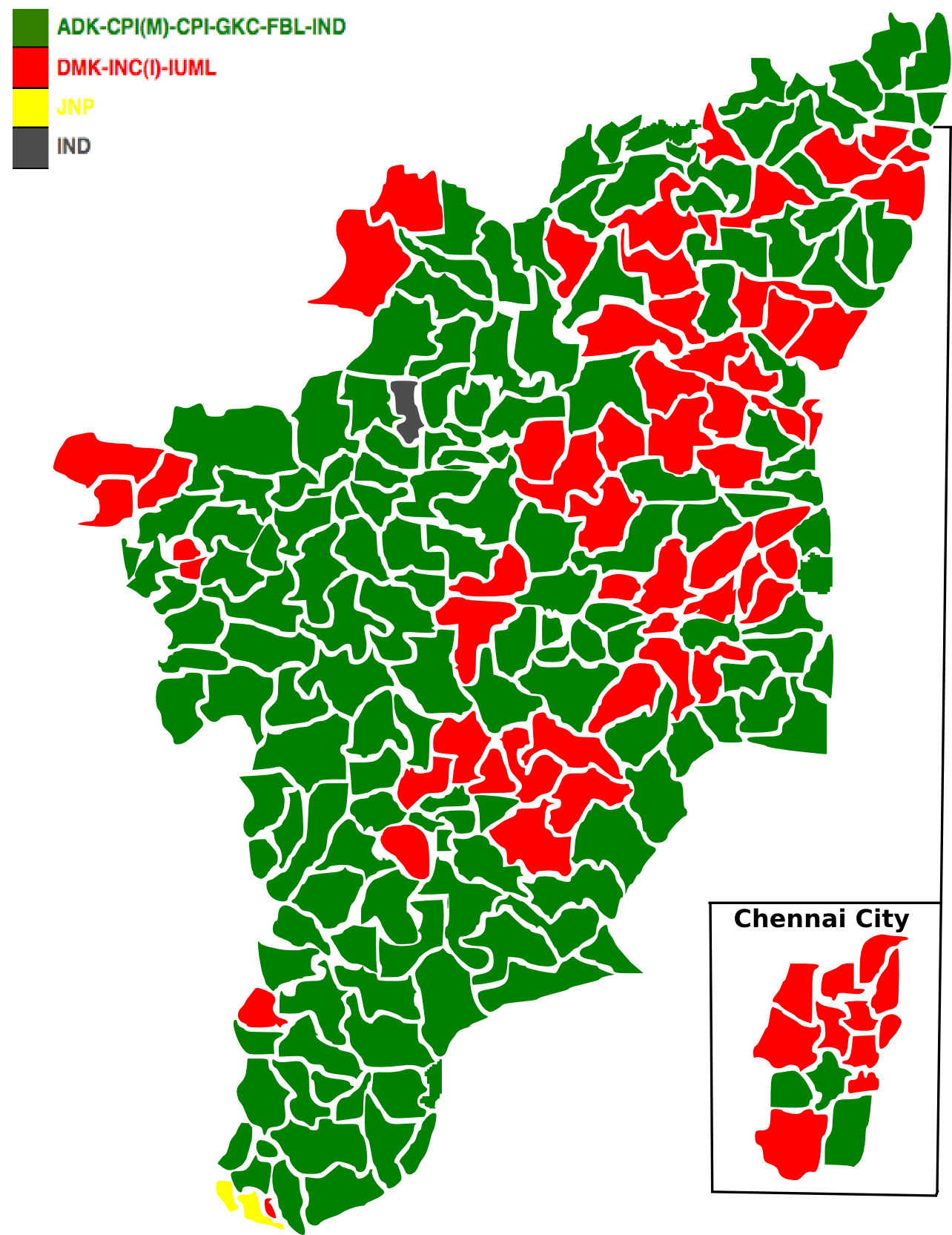
- 1980 election map (by constituencies)

- Alliance wise Result
Chief Minister before election
President's rule
Chief Minister
M. G. Ramachandran
AIADMK

The seventh legislative assembly election of Tamil Nadu was held on 28 May 1980. The election was held two years before the end of the M. G. Ramachandran (MGR) administration's term, as it was dissolved for the failure of the state machinery by the then President of India Neelam Sanjiva Reddy. Dravida Munnetra Kazhagam allied with the Indian National Congress (Indira) and All India Anna Dravida Munnetra Kazhagam allied with Janata Party. Despite their landslide victory of 37 out of 39 seats at the general election in January 1980, DMK and the Indira Congress failed to win the legislative assembly election. AIADMK won the election and its leader and incumbent Chief Minister MGR was sworn in as Chief Minister for the second time.

== Background ==
The All India Anna Dravida Munnetra Kazhagam allied with Indian National Congress (Indira) in 1977 parliamentary election. However, when Janata Party won the election and Morarji Desai became the Prime Minister, M. G. Ramachandran extended unconditional support to the Janata party Government. He continued his support to the Charan Singh Government in 1979. After the fall of the Charan Singh government, fresh parliamentary elections were conducted in 1980. Dravida Munnetra Kazhagam struck alliance with INC(I). AIADMK and Janata Party alliance won only 2 seats in Tamil Nadu in that parliamentary election. INC(I) won the election and Indira Gandhi became the Prime Minister.

M. G. Ramachandran government introduced a ₹9,000 income ceiling in July 1979 to apply an economic criterion for reservation and exclude the “creamy layer,” and later advocated extending reservation to all categories, including the general category, on economic grounds. The move triggered protests led by K. Veeramani and aided M. Karunanidhi’s Dravida Munnetra Kazhagam in the 1980 Lok sabha general election, where the AIADMK suffered a drubbing; the order was withdrawn on 21 January 1980, raising the Backward Classes quota to 50%, following which the K. Veeramani led Dravidar Kazhagam supported the AIADMK in the June 1980 Assembly elections.

== Dismissal of AIADMK government ==
Congress-DMK victory in the 1980 parliamentary election emboldened their alliance and made them think that people lost their faith in M. G. Ramachandran government. DMK pressed the union government to dismiss the Tamil Nadu government. The AIADMK ministry and the assembly were dismissed by the union government on grounds of civil disorder due to Farmers protest for electricity subsidy. General elections were conducted in 1980.

During the campaign, following the dismissal of his government, MGR directly appealed to the electorate with a single question, “What wrong did I do to deserve this (dismissal)?”, thereby reinforcing his reliance on the popular mandate and his image as a leader closely aligned with the masses, which yielded fruitful results. On 1 June 1980, votes were counted. In other states where governments had been dismissed, Congress (I) secured victories. However, in Tamil Nadu alone, the DMK-Congress alliance was defeated, despite having won a landslide victory in loksabha elections just five months earlier.

== Seat allotments ==
After the Lok Sabha election, negotiations in seat allotments between DMK and INC(I) were heated. They finally agreed on contesting in equal number of seats. This led to the debate on who the will be the Chief Minister if the alliance wins, which led to TNCC general secretary G.K. Moopanar and Prime Minister Indira Gandhi announcing that DMK president M. Karunanidhi will be the CM candidate for the alliance. Even after the announcement, party leaders were under the impression that DMK must outperform INC(I), in order for Karunanidhi to get the chief ministership. As part of Aiadmk front, Kumari Ananathan led GKNC contested in Rose electoral Symbol.

=== AIADMK Front ===
AIADMK-led Alliance
Party	Flag	Symbol	Leader	Seats	
All India Anna Dravida Munnetra Kazhagam			M. G. Ramachandran	174	177
Republican Party of India (Gavai)				1	177
Christian Democratic Front (Clement Group)				1	177
Tamil Nadu Muslim League				1	177
Communist Party of India (Marxist)			A. Balasubramaniam	17 (Note: N. Varadarajan of CPM contested on the "Independent" symbol in Dindigul, and is officially recorded as an independent candidate in electoral records.)	
Communist Party of India			P. Manickam	15	
Gandhi Kamaraj National Congress			Kumari Ananthan	10	
Tamil Nadu Kamaraj Congress			Pazha. Nedumaran	7	
All India Forward Bloc			S. Andi Thevar	5 (Note: Three All India Forward Bloc Candidates contested on the "Independent" symbol, and is officially recorded as an independent candidate in electoral records.)	
Indian National Congress (U)			T. N. Anadhanayakhi	3	
Total				234	

=== DMK + INC(I) Front ===
DMK + INC(I) Front
Party	Flag	Symbol	Leader	Seats	
Indian National Congress (I)			M. P. Subramaniam	112	114
Uzhaippalar Munnetra Kazhagam			R. Margabandhu	1	114
Indian National Forward Bloc				1	114
Dravida Munnetra Kazhagam			M. Karunanidhi	108	112
Pasumpon Thevar Forward Bloc				2	112
Christian Democratic Front (Rayan Group)				1	112
Republican Party of India (K)				1	112
Indian Union Muslim League (Note: Scales Symbol was Independent Symbol throughout India, except Punjab in 1980 elections.)			A. K. A. Abdul Samad	8 (Note: IUML Contested as independents under DMK-Indira Congress alliance.)	
Total				234	

== List of Candidates ==
District	Constituency		AIADMK+		DMK + INC(I)	
District	#	Name (Note: SC and ST indicate constituencies reserved for Scheduled Castes and Scheduled Tribes respectively.)	Party	Candidate	Party	Candidate
Madras	1	Royapuram	CPI	D. Pandian	DMK	P. Ponnurangam
Madras	2	Harbour	ADMK	Habibullah Baig (Note: Tamil Nadu Muslim League contested on the "Two Leaves" symbol of the All India Anna Dravida Munnetra Kazhagam (AIADMK), and is officially recorded as a AIADMK candidate in electoral records.)	DMK	A. Selvarajan
Madras	3	R. K. Nagar	ADMK	Isari Velan	INC(I)	V. Rajasekaran
Madras	4	Park Town	GKC	S. Lalchand Daga	DMK	N. V. N. Somu
Madras	5	Perambur (SC)	CPI(M)	V. Murugaian	DMK	S. Balan
Madras	6	Purasawalkam	ADMK	Valampuri John (Note: Christian Democratic Front (Clement Group) contested on the "Two Leaves" symbol of the All India Anna Dravida Munnetra Kazhagam (AIADMK), and is officially recorded as a AIADMK candidate in electoral records.)	DMK	K. Anbazhagan
Madras	7	Egmore (SC)	INC(U)	D. R. Sivanesan	INC(I)	L. Elayaperumal
Madras	8	Anna Nagar	ADMK	H. V. Hande	DMK	M. Karunanidhi
Madras	9	Theagaraya Nagar	GKC	K. Sourirajan	DMK	R. E. Chandran Jeyapal
Madras	10	Thousand Lights	ADMK	K. A. Krishnasamy	DMK	S. J. Sadiq Pasha
Madras	11	Chepauk	ADMK	M. S. Abdul Khader	DMK	A. Rahman Khan
Madras	12	Triplicane	INC(U)	V. K. Sridharan	INC(I)	K. S. G. Haja Shareeff
Madras	13	Mylapore	ADMK	T. K. Kapali	DMK	Nanjil K. Manoharan
Madras	14	Saidapet	ADMK	Saidhai Duraisamy	DMK	D. Purushothaman
Chengalpattu	15	Gummidipundi	ADMK	R. S. Munirathinam	DMK	K. Venu
Chengalpattu	16	Ponneri (SC)	ADMK	R. Chakarapani	DMK	P. Nagalingam
Chengalpattu	17	Thiruvottiyur	GKC	Kumari Ananthan	INC(I)	T. Loganathan
Chengalpattu	18	Villivakkam	ADMK	J. C. D. Prabhakar	DMK	K. Suppu
Chengalpattu	19	Alandur	ADMK	K. M. Abdul Razack	INC(I)	N. P. L. Sampath
Chengalpattu	20	Tambaram	ADMK	Munu Adhi	DMK	Pammal Nallathambi
Chengalpattu	21	Tirupporur (SC)	ADMK	M. Govindarasan	DMK	G. Chockalingam
Chengalpattu	22	Chengalpattu	ADMK	P. G. Anoor Jagadeesan	INC(I)	K. Natarajan
Chengalpattu	23	Maduranthakam	ADMK	S. D. Ugamchand	DMK	C. Arumugam
Chengalpattu	24	Acharapakkam (SC)	ADMK	C. Ganesan	DMK	C. M. Manavalan
Chengalpattu	25	Uthiramerur	ADMK	S. Jagathrakshakan	INC(I)	S. Ramadoss
Chengalpattu	26	Kancheepuram	ADMK	P. Venkatasubramanian	DMK	V. Sambandan
Chengalpattu	27	Sriperumbudur (SC)	ADMK	S. Jaganathan	INC(I)	D. Yasodha
Chengalpattu	28	Poonamallee	GKC	Sambandan	DMK	D. Rajarathinam
Chengalpattu	29	Tiruvallur	ADMK	S. Pattabiraman	INC(I)	R. Purushothaman
Chengalpattu	30	Tiruttani	ADMK	R. Shanmugam	INC(I)	T. Namashivayam
Chengalpattu	31	Pallipet	ADMK	P. M. Narasimhan	INC(I)	A. Eakambara Reddy
North Arcot	32	Arkonam (SC)	ADMK	M. Vijayasarathy	INC(I)	G. Jayaraj
North Arcot	33	Sholinghur	ADMK	C. Gopal	DMK	K. Moorthy
North Arcot	34	Ranipet	ADMK	N. Renu	DMK	Durai Murugan
North Arcot	35	Arcot	ADMK	A. M. Sethuraman	INC(I)	B. Akber Pasha
North Arcot	36	Katpadi	CPI	N. A. Poongavanam	INC(I)	A. K. Shanmugasundaram
North Arcot	37	Gudiyatham	CPI(M)	K. R. Sundaram	IND	K. A. Wahab
North Arcot	38	Pernambut (SC)	ADMK	G. Moorthy	INC(I)	C. Rajarathinam
North Arcot	39	Vaniayambadi	ADMK	N. Kulasekara Pandiyan	IND	M. Abdul Lathief
North Arcot	40	Natrampalli	ADMK	T. Anbazhagan	DMK	N. K. Raja
North Arcot	41	Tiruppattur	ADMK	G. Ramasamy	DMK	B. Sundaram
North Arcot	42	Chengam (SC)	ADMK	T. Swamikannu	INC(I)	A. Arumugam
North Arcot	43	Thandarambattu	GKC	U. Kasinathan	DMK	D. Venugopal
North Arcot	44	Tiruvannamalai	ADMK	P. U. Shunmugam	INC(I)	K. Narayanasamy
North Arcot	45	Kalasapakkam	ADMK	C. N. Visvanathan	DMK	P. S. Thiruvengadam
North Arcot	46	Polur	ADMK	A. Selvan	INC(I)	L. Balaraman
North Arcot	47	Anaicut	ADMK	G. Viswanathan	INC(I)	R. Jeevarathinam
North Arcot	48	Vellore	ADMK	A. K. Ranganathan	DMK	V. M. Devaraj
North Arcot	49	Arni	ADMK	A. C. Shanmugam	DMK	E. Selvarasu
North Arcot	50	Cheyyar	ADMK	K. A. Vizhi Vendan	DMK	Babu Janarthanan
North Arcot	51	Vandavasi (SC)	ADMK	C. Kuppusami	DMK	C. Kanniappan
North Arcot	52	Peranamallur	ADMK	P. M. Venkitesan	INC(I)	R. Margabandhu (Note: Uzhaippalar Munnetra Kazhagam contested on the "Hand" symbol of the Indian National Congress (INC), and is officially recorded as an INC candidate in electoral records.)
South Arcot	53	Melmalayanur	ADMK	A. Chinnadurai	INC(I)	V. Perumal Nainar
South Arcot	54	Gingee	ADMK	G. Krishnasamy	DMK	N. Ramchandran
South Arcot	55	Tindivanam	ADMK	Erajaram Reddy	INC(I)	K. M. Thangamani Gounder
South Arcot	56	Vanur (SC)	ADMK	M. N. Ramajayam	DMK	N. Muthuvel
South Arcot	57	Kandamangalam (SC)	ADMK	M. Kannan	INC(I)	P. Madhavan
South Arcot	58	Villupuram	ADMK	M. Rajarathinam	DMK	K. P. Palaniappan
South Arcot	59	Mugaiyur	ADMK	G. Ragothuman	INC(I)	R. Sundaramurthy
South Arcot	60	Thirunavalur	ADMK	T. N. G. A. Manoharan	DMK	V. Subramanian
South Arcot	61	Ulundurpet (SC)	ADMK	Karu Natesan	DMK	K. Rangasamy
South Arcot	62	Nellikuppam	CPI(M)	C. Govindarajan	DMK	V. Krishnamoorthi
South Arcot	63	Cuddalore	ADMK	A. Ragupathi	DMK	Babu Govindarajan
South Arcot	64	Panruti	ADMK	Panruti Ramachandran	DMK	K. Nandagopalakrishnan
South Arcot	65	Kurinjipadi	ADMK	A. Thangarasu	DMK	M. Selvarasu
South Arcot	66	Bhuvanagiri	ADMK	V. V. Swaminathan	IND	K. S. Asanudeen
South Arcot	67	Kattumannarkoil (SC)	CPI(M)	P. S. Mahalingam	DMK	E. Ramalingam
South Arcot	68	Chidambaram	ADMK	K. R. Ganapathy	DMK	Durai Kaliyamoorthy
South Arcot	69	Vridhachalam	ADMK	C. Ramanathan	INC(I)	R. Thiyagarajan
South Arcot	70	Mangalore (SC)	ADMK	P. Kaliamoorthy	INC(I)	S. Kamaraj
South Arcot	71	Rishivandiam	ADMK	M. Deiveekan	INC(I)	M. Sundaram
South Arcot	72	Chinnasalem	ADMK	A. Ambayiram	INC(I)	S. Sivaraman
South Arcot	73	Sankarapuram	ADMK	S. Kalitheerthan	INC(I)	D. Muthusami
Dharmapuri	74	Hosur	INC(U)	S. Seetharama Reddy	INC(I)	T. Venkata Reddy
Dharmapuri	75	Thalli	CPI	N. Munireddi	INC(I)	D. R. Rajaram Naidu
Dharmapuri	76	Kaveripattinam	ADMK	K. Samarasam	DMK	S. Venkatesan
Dharmapuri	77	Krishnagiri	ADMK	K. R. Chinnarasu	DMK	M. Kamalanathan
Dharmapuri	78	Bargur	ADMK	Bn. S. Doraisamy	DMK	K. Murugesan
Dharmapuri	79	Harur (SC)	ADMK	C. Sabapathy	INC(I)	T. V. Natesan
Dharmapuri	80	Morappur	ADMK	N. Kuppusamy	INC(I)	R. Balasubramanian
Dharmapuri	81	Palacode	ADMK	M. B. Munusamy	INC(I)	R. Balasubhrmaniam
Dharmapuri	82	Dharmapuri	ADMK	S. Aranganathan	INC(I)	D. N. Vadivel
Dharmapuri	83	Pennagaram	GKC	P. Theertha Raman	DMK	K. Marumuthu
Salem	84	Mettur	ADMK	K. P. Nachimuthu	DMK	S. Kandappan
Salem	85	Taramangalam	CPI	S. R. Perumal	INC(I)	R. Narayanan
Salem	86	Omalur	ADMK	M. Sivaperuman	DMK	C. Marimuthu
Salem	87	Yercaud (ST)	ADMK	Thiruman	DMK	R. Natesan
Salem	88	Salem-I	ADMK	G. Krishnaraj	IND	Amanullah Khan
Salem	89	Salem-II	ADMK	M. Arumugam	INC(I)	K. Anbalagan
Salem	90	Veerapandi	ADMK	P. Vijayalakshmi Palanisamy	DMK	K. P. Srinivasan
Salem	91	Panamarathupatty	ADMK	K. Rajaram	INC(I)	P. M. Santhanantham
Salem	92	Attur	ADMK	P. Kandasami	INC(I)	C. Palanimuthu
Salem	93	Talavasal (SC)	ADMK	M. Devarajan	INC(I)	T. Rajambal
Salem	94	Rasipuram	ADMK	K. P. Ramalingam	DMK	P. T. Muthu
Salem	95	Sendamangalam (ST)	ADMK	S. Sivaprakasam	INC(I)	Vadama Gounder
Salem	96	Namakkal (SC)	ADMK	R. Arunachalam	DMK	K. Veluswamy
Salem	97	Kapilamalai	ADMK	C. V. Velappan	INC(I)	P. Sengottaiyan
Salem	98	Tiruchengode	ADMK	C. Ponnaiyan	INC(I)	T. M. Kaliannan
Salem	99	Sankari (SC)	ADMK	P. Dhanapal	DMK	R. Varadarajan
Salem	100	Edapadi	ADMK	I. Ganesan	INC(I)	K. S. Subramania Gounder
Coimbatore	101	Mettupalayam	ADMK	S. Palanisamy	INC(I)	K. Vijayan
Coimbatore	102	Avanashi (SC)	CPI	M. Arumugam	INC(I)	S. N. Palanisamy
Coimbatore	103	Thondamuthur	ADMK	Chinnaraj	DMK	R. Manickkavachagam
Coimbatore	104	Singanallur	CPI(M)	R. Venkidu	DMK	A. D. Kulasekar
Coimbatore	105	Coimbatore West	ADMK	C. Aranganayagam	DMK	M. Ramanathan
Coimbatore	106	Coimbatore East	CPI(M)	K. Ramani	INC(I)	Ganga Nair
Coimbatore	107	Perur	ADMK	Kovaithambi	DMK	A. Natarasan
Coimbatore	108	Kinathukkadavu	ADMK	K. V. Kandasamy	INC(I)	S. T. Doraiswamy
Coimbatore	109	Pollachi	ADMK	M. V. Rathinam	DMK	M. Kannappan
Coimbatore	110	Valparai (SC)	CPI	A. T. Karuppiah	INC(I)	Kovai Thangam
Coimbatore	111	Udumalpet	ADMK	P. Kolandaivelu	DMK	R. T. Mariappan
Coimbatore	112	Dharapuram (SC)	ADMK	A. Periasamy	DMK	V. P. Palaniammal
Coimbatore	113	Vellakoil	ADMK	D. Ramasami	INC(I)	N. Nallasenapathy Sakkarai
Coimbatore	114	Pongalur	ADMK	P. Kandaswamy	INC(I)	S. R. Balasubramaniam
Coimbatore	115	Palladam	ADMK	Paramasiva Gounder	INC(I)	K. N. Kumarasamy
Coimbatore	116	Tiruppur	ADMK	R. Manimaran	INC(I)	Mohan Kandasamy
Coimbatore	117	Kangayam	ADMK	K. G. Krishnaswamy	DMK	M. Sivasabapathi
Erode	118	Modakurichi	ADMK	S. Balakrishnan	DMK	A. Ganeshamoorthy
Erode	119	Perundurai	CPI	T. K. Nallapan	INC(I)	N. K. P. Jaganathan
Erode	120	Erode	ADMK	S. Muthusamy	INC(I)	R. Sainathan
Erode	121	Bhavani	ADMK	P. G. Narayanan	INC(I)	M. P. V. Madeswaran
Erode	122	Andhiyur (SC)	ADMK	P. Guruswamy	DMK	T. G. Vadivel
Erode	123	Gobichettipalayam	ADMK	K. A. Sengottaiyan	INC(I)	K. M. Subramaniam
Erode	124	Bhavanisagar	ADMK	G. K. Subramaniam	DMK	Sampoornam Swamynathan
Erode	125	Sathyamangalam	ADMK	R. Rangasamy	INC(I)	C. R. Rasappa
Nilgiris	126	Coonoor (SC)	ADMK	C. Periasamy	DMK	M. Ranganathan
Nilgiris	127	Ootacamund	ADMK	B. Gopalan	INC(I)	K. Kallan
Nilgiris	128	Gudalur	CPI	M. S. Narayanan Nair	DMK	K. Hutchi
Madurai	129	Palani (SC)	CPI(M)	N. Palanivel	INC(I)	S. R. P. Mani
Madurai	130	Oddanchatram	ADMK	K. Kuppuswamy	INC(I)	S. K. Palaniswamy
Madurai	131	Periyakulam	ADMK	K. Gopalakrishnan	INC(I)	K. Sheik Abdul Kader
Madurai	132	Theni	ADMK	V. R. Jeyaraman	INC(I)	N. R. Alagar Raja
Madurai	133	Bodinayakkanur	ADMK	K. M. S. Subramanian	INC(I)	K. S. M. Ramachandran
Madurai	134	Cumbum	ADMK	R. T. Gopalan	DMK	A. K. Cumbum Mahandiran
Madurai	135	Andipatti	ADMK	S. S. Rajendran	INC(I)	K. Kandasamy
Madurai	136	Sedapatti	ADMK	Sedapatti R. Muthiah	DMK	R. S. Thangarasan
Madurai	137	Thirumangalam	AIFB	A. R. Perumal	INC(I)	N. S. V. Chitthan
Madurai	138	Usilampatti	AIFB	S. Andi Thevar	DMK	L. Santhanam (Note: Pasumpon Thevar Forward Bloc contested on the "Rising Sun" symbol of the Dravida Munnetra Kazhagam (DMK), and is officially recorded as a DMK candidate in electoral records.)
Madurai	139	Nilakottai (SC)	IND	A. S. Ponnammal (Note: Tamil Nadu Kamaraj Congress contested on the "Independent" symbol, and is officially recorded as an independent candidate in electoral records.)	DMK	A. Manivasagam
Madurai	140	Sholavandan	ADMK	P. S. Manian	INC(I)	A. Chandrasekaran
Madurai	141	Tirupparankundram	ADMK	K. Kalimuthu	DMK	P. Seeni Thevar
Madurai	142	Madurai West	ADMK	M. G. Ramachandran	DMK	Pon. Muthuramalingam
Madurai	143	Madurai Central	IND	P. Nedumaran	DMK	P. T. R. Palanivel Rajan
Madurai	144	Madurai East	CPI(M)	N. Sankariah	INC(I)	M. A. Ramamoorthy
Madurai	145	Samayanallur (SC)	ADMK	A. Baluchamy	DMK	P. Subashchandra Bose
Madurai	146	Melur	ADMK	A. M. Paramasivan	INC(I)	K. V. Veeranambalam
Madurai	147	Natham	IND	T. Alagarisamy	INC(I)	M. Andi Ambalam
Madurai	148	Dindigul	IND	N. Varadarajan	INC(I)	N. Abdul Khader
Madurai	149	Athoor	ADMK	A. Vellaisamy	DMK	Rajambal
Madurai	150	Vedasandur	ADMK	V. P. Balasubramanian	INC(I)	G. P. V. Raju
Tiruchirapalli	151	Aravakurichi	ADMK	P. S. Sennimalai	INC(I)	K. Shanmugam
Tiruchirapalli	152	Karur	ADMK	M. Chinnasamy	DMK	S. Nallasamy
Tiruchirapalli	153	Krishnarayapuram (SC)	ADMK	O. Rengaraju	INC(I)	P. M. Thangavelraj
Tiruchirapalli	154	Marungapuri	ADMK	M. A. Raj Kumar	INC(I)	V. Ramanathan
Tiruchirapalli	155	Kulithalai	CPI	R. Karuppaiah	INC(I)	P. E. Srinivasa Reddiar
Tiruchirapalli	156	Thottiam	IND	T. P. K. Jayaraj	INC(I)	R. Periasami
Tiruchirapalli	157	Uppiliapuram (ST)	ADMK	V. Arengarajan	INC(I)	R. Palanimuthu
Tiruchirapalli	158	Musiri	ADMK	M. K. Rajamanickam	DMK	R. Natarajan
Tiruchirapalli	159	Lalgudi	IND	A. Swamickan	DMK	Anbil Dharmalingam
Tiruchirapalli	160	Perambalur (SC)	ADMK	M. Angamuthu	DMK	J. S. Raju
Tiruchirapalli	161	Varahur (SC)	ADMK	N. Perumal	INC(I)	P. Chinnaian
Tiruchirapalli	162	Ariyalur	ADMK	M. Asokan	DMK	T. Arumugam
Tiruchirapalli	163	Andimadam	ADMK	S. Krishnamoorthy	DMK	S. Sivasubramanian
Tiruchirapalli	164	Jayankondam	ADMK	T. Selvarajan	INC(I)	P. Thangavelu
Tiruchirapalli	165	Srirangam	ADMK	R. Soundararajan	INC(I)	V. Swaminathan
Tiruchirapalli	166	Tiruchirapalli-I	ADMK	P. Musiri Putthan	DMK	A. V. Krishnamurthi
Tiruchirapalli	167	Tiruchirapalli-II	ADMK	K. Soundararajan	IND	K. M. Kader Mohideen
Tiruchirapalli	168	Thiruverambur	ADMK	N. Gurusamy	DMK	K. S. Murugesan
Thanjavur	169	Sirkali (SC)	ADMK	K. Balasubramanian	DMK	K. Subravelu
Thanjavur	170	Poompuhar	ADMK	N. Vijayabalan	DMK	S. Ganesan
Thanjavur	171	Mayuram	ADMK	Bala Velayutham	DMK	N. Kittappa
Thanjavur	172	Kuttalam	CPI(M)	G. Veeraiyan	DMK	R. Rajamanickam
Thanjavur	173	Nannilam (SC)	ADMK	A. Kalaiarasan	DMK	M. Manimaran
Thanjavur	174	Tiruvarur (SC)	CPI(M)	M. Sellamuthu	DMK	Kovi Kuppusamy
Thanjavur	175	Nagapattinam	CPI(M)	R. Umanath	INC(I)	S. S. R. Ramanatha Thevar
Thanjavur	176	Vedaranyam	ADMK	M. S. Manickam	DMK	M. Meenatchisundaram
Thanjavur	177	Tiruthuraipundi (SC)	CPI(M)	P. Uthirapathi	INC(I)	V. Vedaiyan
Thanjavur	178	Mannargudi	CPI	M. Ambikapathy	INC(I)	M. Gopalasamy Thenkondar
Thanjavur	179	Pattukkottai	ADMK	S. D. Somasundaram	INC(I)	A. R. Marimuthu
Thanjavur	180	Peravurani	ADMK	M. R. Govendan	INC(I)	A. Palanivel
Thanjavur	181	Orathanad	ADMK	T. M. Thailappan	INC(I)	T. Veeraswamy
Thanjavur	182	Thiruvonam	ADMK	Durai Govindarajan	INC(I)	N. Sivagnanam
Thanjavur	183	Thanjavur	IND	A. Ramamurthy	DMK	S. Natarajan
Thanjavur	184	Tiruvaiyaru	ADMK	M. Subramanian	DMK	G. Elangovan
Thanjavur	185	Papanasam	ADMK	Govi Narayanaswamy	INC(I)	S. Rajaraman
Thanjavur	186	Valangiman (SC)	ADMK	Gomathi Srinivasan	DMK	A. Chellappa
Thanjavur	187	Kumbakonam	ADMK	S. R. Eradha	INC(I)	E. S. M. Pakeer Mohamed
Thanjavur	188	Thiruvidamarudur	ADMK	K. Rajamanickam	DMK	S. Ramalingam
Pudukottai	189	Thirumayam	ADMK	Pulavar Ponnambalam	INC(I)	N. Sundararaj
Pudukottai	190	Kolathur (SC)	ADMK	T. Marimuthu	DMK	A. Keerai Thamizhselvan
Pudukottai	191	Pudukkottai	CPI	K. R. Subbiah	INC(I)	Rajkumar Thondaiman
Pudukottai	192	Alangudi	ADMK	P. M. Thirumaran	INC(I)	T. Pushparaju
Pudukottai	193	Arantangi	ADMK	S. Thirunavukkarasu	IND	M. Mohamed Mashood
Ramanathapuram	194	Tiruppattur	CPI	S. Shanmugam Koothakudi	INC(I)	V. Valmigi
Ramanathapuram	195	Karaikudi	ADMK	P. Kaliappan	DMK	C. T. Chidambaram
Ramanathapuram	196	Tiruvadanai	ADMK	S. Anguchamy	INC(I)	A. T. M. Ramanathan Thevar
Ramanathapuram	197	Ilayangudi	CPI	S. Sivasamy	DMK	V. Malaikkannan
Ramanathapuram	198	Sivaganga	IND	N. Natarajasamy	INC(I)	O. Subramanian
Ramanathapuram	199	Manamadurai (SC)	IND	K. Paramalai	INC(I)	U. Krishnan
Ramanathapuram	200	Paramakudi (SC)	ADMK	R. Thavasi	DMK	A. Elamaran
Ramanathapuram	201	Ramanathapuram	ADMK	T. Ramasamy	INC(I)	Zeenath Sheriffdeen
Ramanathapuram	202	Kadaladi	ADMK	S. Sathiamoorthy	IND	T. S. O. Abdul Cadir
Ramanathapuram	203	Mudukulathur	IND	K. Dhanukkodi Thevar	INC(I)	S. Balakrishnan
Ramanathapuram	204	Aruppukottai	ADMK	M. Pituhai	DMK	V. Thangapandian
Ramanathapuram	205	Sattur	ADMK	K. K. S. S. R. Ramachandran	DMK	S. Saudi Sundara Barati
Ramanathapuram	206	Virudhunagar	ADMK	M. Sundararajan	DMK	P. Srinivasan
Ramanathapuram	207	Sivakasi	ADMK	V. Balakrishnan	DMK	S. Alagu Thevar
Ramanathapuram	208	Srivilliputhur	ADMK	R. Thamaraikkani	INC(I)	P. Karruppiah Thevar
Ramanathapuram	209	Rajapalayam (SC)	IND	P. Mokkian	INC(I)	K. Pottu Pottan
Tirunelveli	210	Vilathikulam	ADMK	R. K. Perumal	DMK	S. Kumaragurubara
Tirunelveli	211	Pottapidaram (SC)	CPI	M. Appadurai	INC(I)	O. S. Veluchami
Tirunelveli	212	Koilpatti	CPI	S. Alagarasamy	INC(I)	V. Jeyalakshmi
Tirunelveli	213	Sankaranayanarkoil (SC)	ADMK	P. Durairaj	DMK	K. Madan
Tirunelveli	214	Vasudevanallur (SC)	CPI(M)	R. Krishnan	INC(I)	R. Eswaran
Tirunelveli	215	Kadayanallur	ADMK	A. M. Gani	IND	A. Shahul Hameed
Tirunelveli	216	Tenkasi	ADMK	A. K. Sattanatha Karayalar	INC(I)	T. R. Ramanan
Tirunelveli	217	Alangulam	GKC	R. Navaneetha Pandian	DMK	E. Dorai Singh
Tirunelveli	218	Tirunelveli	ADMK	V. R. Nedunchezhiyan	INC(I)	Rajathi Kunchithapatham
Tirunelveli	219	Palayamcottai	ADMK	V. R. Karuppasami Pandian	DMK	Suba Seetharaman
Tirunelveli	220	Cheranmahadevi	ADMK	P. H. Pandian	INC(I)	V. Ratnasabhapathy
Tirunelveli	221	Ambasamudram	CPI(M)	Easwarmoorthy	INC(I)	S. Sangumuthu Thevar
Tirunelveli	222	Nanguneri	ADMK	N. John Vincent	INC(I)	J. Thangaraj
Tirunelveli	223	Radhapuram	GKC	S. Muthu Ramalingam	DMK	Nellai Nedumaran
Tirunelveli	224	Sattangulam	GKC	S. N. Ramasamy	INC(I)	R. Dhanuskodi Athithan
Tirunelveli	225	Tiruchendur	ADMK	S. Kesava Athithan	DMK	Samsudin Alias Kathiravan
Tirunelveli	226	Srivaikuntam	ADMK	E. Ramasubramanian	INC(I)	V. Shanmugam
Tirunelveli	227	Tuticorin	ADMK	S. N. Rajendran	DMK	R. Krishnan
Kanyakumari	228	Kanniyakumari	ADMK	S. Muthukrishnan	INC(I)	A. Mathevan Pillai
Kanyakumari	229	Nagercoil	ADMK	M. Vincent	DMK	A. Thiraviam
Kanyakumari	230	Colachel	ADMK	M. Sanotsham	DMK	Retnaraj
Kanyakumari	231	Padmanabhapuram	GKC	K. Lawrence	INC(I)	A. Pauliah
Kanyakumari	232	Thiruvattar	CPI(M)	J. Hemachandran	INC(I)	P. Thobias
Kanyakumari	233	Vilavancode	CPI(M)	D. Moni	DMK	P. Davis Raj (Note: Christian Democratic Front (Rayan group) contested on the "Rising Sun" symbol of the Dravida Munnetra Kazhagam (DMK), and is officially recorded as a DMK candidate in electoral records.)
Kanyakumari	234	Killiyoor	ADMK	R. S. Radhakrishnan	DMK	C. Russel Raj

== Voting and results ==
=== Results by Pre-Poll Alliance ===
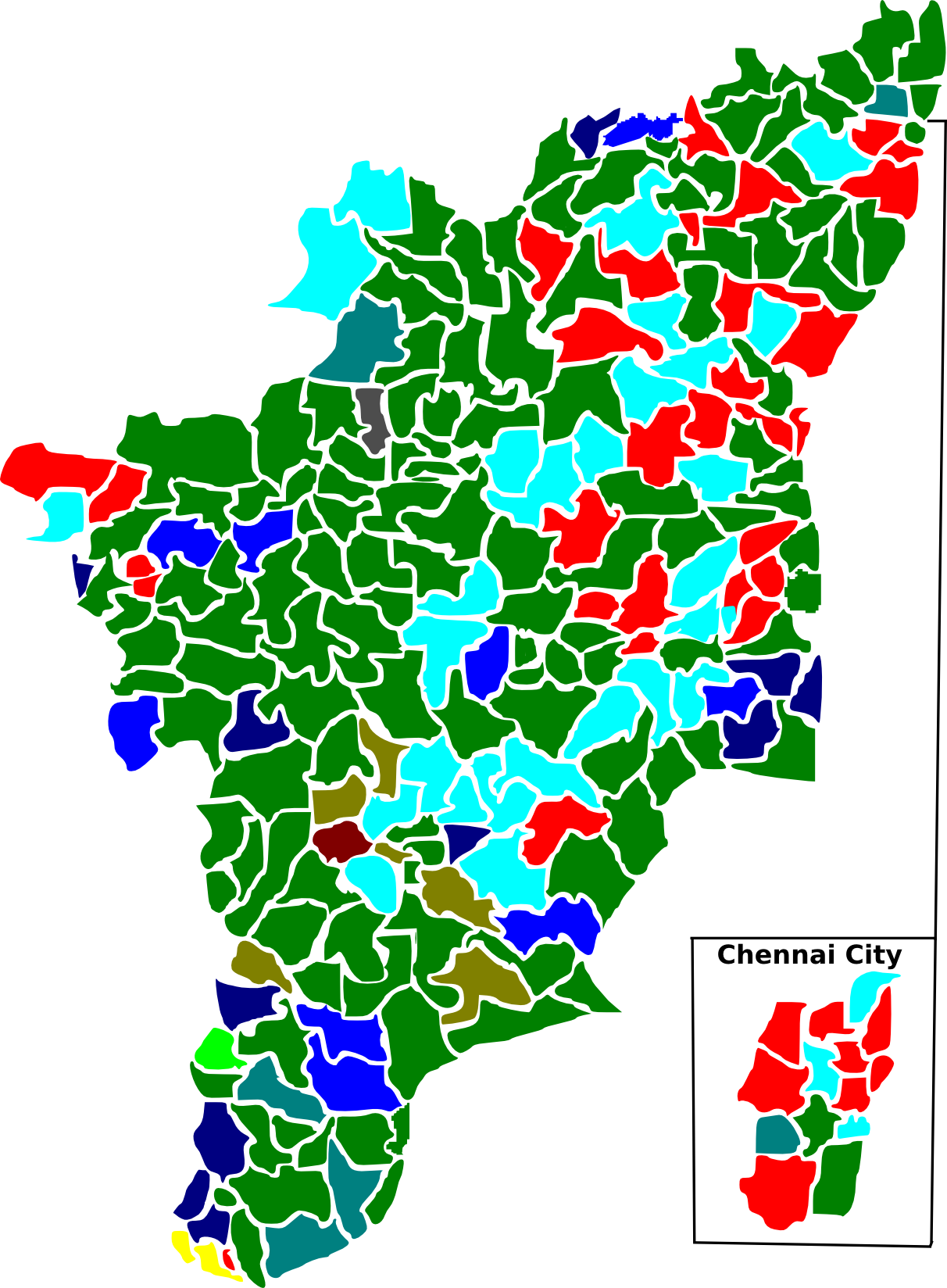
Election map of results based on parties. Colours are based on the results table on the left

Summary of the 1980 May Tamil Nadu Legislative Assembly election results
Alliance/Party	Seats won	Change	Popular Vote	Vote %	Adj. %^{‡}
AIADMK+ alliance	162	+18	9,328,839	48.9%	
AIADMK	129	−1	7,303,010	38.8%	50.4%
CPI(M)	11	−1	596,406	3.2%	47.6%
CPI	9	+4	501,032	2.7%	43.9%
GKC	6	+6	322,440	1.7%	44.1%
IND	6	+6	488,296	2.6%	
FBL	1	–	65,536	0.4%	44.6%
INC(U)	0	–	52,119	0.3%	29.3%
DMK+ alliance	69	−6	8,371,718	44.4%	
DMK	37	−11	4,164,389	22.1%	45.7%
INC(I)	31	+4	3,941,900	20.9%	43.4%
IND	1	+1	265,429	1.4%	
Others	3	−8	1,144,449	6.1%	
JNP(JP)	2	−8	522,641	2.8%	6.9%
IND	1	–	598,897	3.2%	–
Total	234	–	18,845,006	100%	–

‡: Vote % reflects the percentage of votes the party received compared to the entire electorate that voted in this election. Adjusted (Adj.) Vote %, reflects the % of votes the party received per constituency that they contested.
Sources: Election Commission of India and Keesing's Report

=== Results by district ===
District	Seats			
District	Seats	ADK+	DMK+	OTH
Chengalpattu	17	13	4	—N/a
Madras	14	3	11	—N/a
North Arcot	21	13	8	—N/a
South Arcot	21	8	13	—N/a
Dharmapuri	10	8	2	—N/a
Salem	17	15	2	—N/a
Coimbatore	17	16	1	—N/a
Erode	8	8	—N/a	—N/a
Nilgiris	3	—N/a	3	—N/a
Tiruchirapalli	18	12	6	—N/a
Thanjavur	20	12	8	—N/a
Pudukottai	5	3	2	—N/a
Ramanathapuram	16	13	3	—N/a
Madurai	22	17	4	1
Tirunelveli	18	17	1	—N/a
Kanyakumari	7	4	1	2
Total	234	162	69	3

=== By Region ===
Alliance-wise Results
Region	Total Seats	AIADMK-led Alliance	DMK - Congress Alliance
Northern Tamil Nadu	73	37 / 73 (51%)	36 / 73 (49%)
Western Tamil Nadu	55	47 / 55 (85%)	8 / 55 (15%)
Southern TamilNadu	63	51 / 63 (81%)	9 / 63 (14%)
Central TamilNadu	43	27 / 43 (63%)	16 / 43 (37%)

=== By constituency ===
Winner, runner-up, voter turnout, and victory margin in every constituency
District	Assembly Constituency		Winner				Runner Up				Margin
District	#k	Name	Candidate	Party	Votes	%	Candidate	Party	Votes	%	Margin
Madras	1	Royapuram	Ponnurangam. P	DMK	37,390	50.31	Pandian. D	CPI	36,455	49.05	935
Madras	2	Harbour	Selvarasan. A	DMK	32,716	54.14	Habibulla Baig. Dr.	AIADMK	21,701	35.91	11,015
Madras	3	Radhakrishnan Nagar	Rajasekaran. V	INC	44,076	48.62	Isari Velan	AIADMK	36,888	40.69	7,188
Madras	4	Park Town	N. V. N. Somu	DMK	38,095	55.94	Lalchand Daga. S.	GKC	23,197	34.06	14,898
Madras	5	Perambur	Balan. S	DMK	49,269	54.59	Murugaian. V	CPI(M)	40,989	45.41	8,280
Madras	6	Purasawalkam	Anbazhagan. K	DMK	52,729	52.35	Valampuri John	AIADMK	47,021	46.68	5,708
Madras	7	Egmore	Ellayaperumal. L	INC	38,200	61.19	Sivanesan. D. R	INC(U)	23,444	37.55	14,756
Madras	8	Anna Nagar	M. Karunanidhi	DMK	51,290	48.97	H. V. Hande	AIADMK	50,591	48.31	699
Madras	9	Thiyagaraya Nagar	K. Sourirajan	GKC	42,566	50.58	Chandran Jeyapal. R. E	DMK	36,100	42.89	6,466
Madras	10	Thousand Lights	Krishnasamy. K. A	AIADMK	40,499	50.19	Sadiq Pasha. S. J	DMK	40,192	49.81	307
Madras	11	Chepauk	A. Rahman Khan	DMK	32,627	55.64	Abdul Khader. M. S	AIADMK	23,401	39.91	9,226
Madras	12	Triplicane	K. S. G. Haja Shareef	INC	33,664	52.77	Sridharan. V. K	INC(U)	26,786	41.99	6,878
Madras	13	Mylapore	T. K. Kapali	AIADMK	41,260	49.66	Manoharan. K	DMK	37,944	45.67	3,316
Madras	14	Saidapet	D. Purushothaman	DMK	40,403	47.95	Saithai Duraisamy. S	AIADMK	38,706	45.94	1,697
Chengalpattu	15	Gummidipoondi	R. S. Munirathinam	AIADMK	41,845	49.01	Venu. K	DMK	34,019	39.84	7,826
Chengalpattu	16	Ponneri	Chakarapani. R	AIADMK	42,408	51.07	Nagalingam. P	DMK	27,490	33.11	14,918
Chengalpattu	17	Thiruvottiyur	Kumari Ananthan	GKC	48,451	47.36	Loganathan. T	INC	44,993	43.98	3,458
Chengalpattu	18	Villivakkam	Prabakaran. J. C. D	AIADMK	57,192	47.84	Suppu. K	DMK	56,489	47.25	703
Chengalpattu	19	Alandur	K. M. Abdul Razack	AIADMK	50,345	50.18	Sampath. N. P. L	INC	44,506	44.36	5,839
Chengalpattu	20	Tambaram	Pammal Nallathambi	DMK	59,931	51.52	Munu Adhi	AIADMK	53,746	46.2	6,185
Chengalpattu	21	Thiruporur	G. Chockalingam	DMK	33,287	50.63	Govindarasan. M	AIADMK	30,990	47.13	2,297
Chengalpattu	22	Chengalpattu	P. G. Anoor Jegadeesan	AIADMK	40,466	53.07	Natarajan. K	INC	35,314	46.32	5,152
Chengalpattu	23	Maduranthakam	S. D. Ugamchand	AIADMK	46,922	56.84	C. Arumugam	DMK	35,113	42.54	11,809
Chengalpattu	24	Acharapakkam	C. Ganesan	AIADMK	35,233	50.08	Manavalan. C. M	DMK	35,114	49.92	119
Chengalpattu	25	Uthiramerur	S. Jagathrakshakan	AIADMK	43,303	49.11	Ramadoss. S	INC	41,717	47.31	1,586
Chengalpattu	26	Kancheepuram	P. Venkatasubramanian	AIADMK	46,051	48.25	Sambandan. V	DMK	43,859	45.95	2,192
Chengalpattu	27	Sriperumbudur	D. Yasodha	INC	37,370	52.97	Jaganathan. S	AIADMK	31,341	44.42	6,029
Chengalpattu	28	Poonamallee	Rajarathinam. D.	DMK	38,018	48.83	Sambandan	GKC	26,930	34.59	11,088
Chengalpattu	29	Thiruvallur	Pattabiraman. S	AIADMK	30,121	41.49	Purushothaman. R	INC	24,585	33.87	5,536
Chengalpattu	30	Tiruttani	Shanmugam. R	AIADMK	35,845	49.6	Namashivayam. T	INC	25,754	35.64	10,091
Chengalpattu	31	Pallipet	Narasimhan. P. M	AIADMK	26,377	35.03	Eakambara Reddy. A	INC	25,967	34.48	410
North Arcot	32	Arakkonam	M. Vijayasarathy	AIADMK	36,314	48.84	Jayaraj. G	INC	35,393	47.6	921
North Arcot	33	Sholingur	C. Gopal Mudaliyar	AIADMK	35,783	49.4	Moorthy. K	DMK	35,626	49.18	157
North Arcot	34	Ranipet	Durai Murugan	DMK	44,318	53.7	Renu. N	AIADMK	37,064	44.91	7,254
North Arcot	35	Arcot	Sethuraman. A M	AIADMK	35,998	48.85	Akber Pasha. B	INC	34,058	46.21	1,940
North Arcot	36	Katpadi	Poongavanam. N. A	CPI	31,918	46.48	Shanmugasundaram. A. K	INC	26,639	38.79	5,279
North Arcot	37	Gudiyatham	Sundaram. K. R	CPI(M)	30,869	43.87	Wahab. K. A	IND	20,929	29.74	9,940
North Arcot	38	Pernambut	Moorthy. G	AIADMK	30,048	45.31	Rajarathinam. C	INC	24,713	37.26	5,335
North Arcot	39	Vaniyambadi	Kulasekara Pandiyan. N	AIADMK	38,049	52.54	Abdul Latheef. M	IND	34,375	47.46	3,674
North Arcot	40	Natrampalli	Anbazhagan. T	AIADMK	42,786	49.82	Raja. N. K	DMK	36,161	42.11	6,625
North Arcot	41	Tirupattur (Vellore)	B. Sundaram	DMK	42,786	54.74	Ramasamy. G	AIADMK	34,682	44.37	8,104
North Arcot	42	Chengam	T. Swamikannu	AIADMK	26,823	48.06	Arumugam. A	INC	25,987	46.56	836
North Arcot	43	Thandarambattu	Venugopal. D	DMK	46,326	63.86	Kasinathan. U	GKC	25,257	34.82	21,069
North Arcot	44	Tiruvannamalai	Narayanasamy. K	INC	54,437	58.78	Shunmugam. P. U	AIADMK	36,052	38.93	18,385
North Arcot	45	Kalasapakkam	P. S. Thiruvengadam	DMK	44,923	54.49	Visvanathan. C. N	AIADMK	32,972	39.99	11,951
North Arcot	46	Polur	L. Balaraman	INC	35,456	48.92	Selvan. A	AIADMK	33,303	45.95	2,153
North Arcot	47	Anaikattu	G. Viswanathan	AIADMK	35,242	53.37	Jeevarathinam. R	INC	29,287	44.35	5,955
North Arcot	48	Vellore	V. M. Devaraj	DMK	43,126	49.68	Ranganathan. A. K	AIADMK	38,619	44.49	4,507
North Arcot	49	Arani	A. C. Shanmugam	AIADMK	42,928	50.65	Selvarasu. E	DMK	37,877	44.69	5,051
North Arcot	50	Cheyyar	Babu Janarthanan	DMK	43,341	55.26	Vizhi Vendan. K. A.	AIADMK	35,091	44.74	8,250
North Arcot	51	Vandavasi	Kuppusami. C	AIADMK	38,501	50.21	Kanniappan. C	DMK	36,019	46.97	2,482
North Arcot	52	Peranamallur	Venkitesan. P. M	AIADMK	32,645	44.09	Margabandu. R	INC	31,767	42.9	878
South Arcot	53	Melmalayanur	Chinnadurai. A	AIADMK	39,572	48.84	Perumal Nainar. V	INC	39,374	48.59	198
South Arcot	54	Gingee	Ramchandran. N	DMK	41,708	49.92	Krishnasamy. G	AIADMK	40,075	47.96	1,633
South Arcot	55	Tindivanam	Thangamani Gounder. K. M	INC	29,778	42.33	Erajaram Reddy	AIADMK	24,302	34.55	5,476
South Arcot	56	Vanur	N. Muthuvel	DMK	38,883	52.89	Ramajayam. M. N	AIADMK	33,635	45.75	5,248
South Arcot	57	Kandamangalam	Kannan. M	AIADMK	34,368	49.49	Madhavan. P	INC	32,011	46.09	2,357
South Arcot	58	Villupuram	Palaniappan. K. P	DMK	45,952	52.02	Rajarathinam. M	AIADMK	40,792	46.18	5,160
South Arcot	59	Mugaiyur	Sundaramurthy. R	INC	39,490	53.17	Ragothuman. G	AIADMK	31,889	42.94	7,601
South Arcot	60	Thirunavalur	Subramanian. V	DMK	36,517	48.29	Manoharan. T. N. G. A	AIADMK	36,344	48.06	173
South Arcot	61	Ulundurpet	Rangasamy. K	DMK	40,068	55.35	Natesan. Karu	AIADMK	30,113	41.6	9,955
South Arcot	62	Nellikuppam	Krishnamoorthi. V	DMK	40,526	55.17	Govindarajan. C	CPI(M)	28,415	38.68	12,111
South Arcot	63	Cuddalore	Babu Govindarajan	DMK	40,539	49.05	Ragupathi. A	AIADMK	37,398	45.25	3,141
South Arcot	64	Panruti	S. Ramachandaran	AIADMK	44,557	51.88	K. Nandagopala Krishnan	DMK	40,070	46.65	4,487
South Arcot	65	Kurinjipadi	A. Thangarasu	AIADMK	38,349	49.65	M. Selvaraj	DMK	35,390	45.82	2,959
South Arcot	66	Bhuvanagiri	V. V. Swaminathan	AIADMK	41,207	49.1	Asanudeen. K. S	IND	34,883	41.56	6,324
South Arcot	67	Kattumannarkoil	E. Ramalingam	DMK	44,012	59.46	Mahalingam. P. S	CPI(M)	29,350	39.65	14,662
South Arcot	68	Chidambaram	K. R. Ganapathi	AIADMK	41,728	51.71	Kaliyamoorthy Durai	DMK	38,461	47.66	3,267
South Arcot	69	Vriddhachalam	R. Thiyagarajan	INC	45,382	51.86	C. Ramanathan	AIADMK	41,234	47.12	4,148
South Arcot	70	Mangalore	Kaliamoorthy. P	AIADMK	40,678	48.9	Kamaraj. S	INC	39,495	47.48	1,183
South Arcot	71	Rishivandiyam	Sundaram. M	INC	38,238	51.11	Deiveekan. M	AIADMK	33,317	44.54	4,921
South Arcot	72	Chinnasalem	S. Sivaraman	INC	39,370	52.45	Ambayiram. A	AIADMK	34,123	45.46	5,247
South Arcot	73	Sankarapuram	Kalitheerthan. S	AIADMK	36,352	49.91	Muthusami. D	INC	32,811	45.05	3,541
Dharmapuri	74	Hosur	T. Venkata Reddy	INC	25,855	49.8	Kothandaramaiah. K. S	IND	21,443	41.31	4,412
Dharmapuri	75	Thalli	D. R. Rajaram Naidu	INC	25,558	41.53	Vijayendriah. D. R	JP	22,601	36.72	2,957
Dharmapuri	76	Kaveripattinam	Samarasam. K	AIADMK	35,434	51.13	Venkatesan. S	DMK	31,911	46.05	3,523
Dharmapuri	77	Krishnagiri	Chinnarasu. K. R	AIADMK	28,020	49.75	Kamalanathan. M	DMK	26,223	46.55	1,797
Dharmapuri	78	Bargur	Doraisamy. Bn. S	AIADMK	39,893	57.26	Murugesan. K	DMK	29,045	41.69	10,848
Dharmapuri	79	Harur	Sabapathy. C.	AIADMK	40,009	57.66	Natesan. T. V.	INC	27,401	39.49	12,608
Dharmapuri	80	Morappur	Kuppusamy. N.	AIADMK	43,096	57.18	Balasubramanian. R.	INC	29,967	39.76	13,129
Dharmapuri	81	Palacode	Munusamy. M. B.	AIADMK	38,999	52.36	Balasubhrmaniam . R.	INC	34,864	46.81	4,135
Dharmapuri	82	Dharmapuri	Aranganathan. S.	AIADMK	33,977	46.12	Vadivel. D. N.	INC	32,472	44.08	1,505
Dharmapuri	83	Pennagaram	Theertha Raman. P	GKC	34,590	52.74	Marumuthu. K	DMK	27,481	41.9	7,109
Salem	84	Mettur	Nachimuthu. K. P	AIADMK	48,845	58.28	Kandappan. S	DMK	29,977	35.77	18,868
Salem	85	Taramangalam	Semmalai. S	IND	49,597	60.33	Narayanan. R	INC	27,214	33.11	22,383
Salem	86	Omalur	Sivaperuman. M	AIADMK	42,399	58.2	Marimuthu. C	DMK	30,447	41.8	11,952
Salem	87	Yercaud	Thiruman	AIADMK	28,869	51.35	Natesan. R	DMK	27,020	48.06	1,849
Salem	88	Salem-I	Krishnaraj. G	AIADMK	50,976	52.55	Amanullah Khan	IND	31,745	32.72	19,231
Salem	89	Salem-Ii	Arumugam. M	AIADMK	40,975	51.57	Anbalagan. K	INC	36,235	45.61	4,740
Salem	90	Veerapandi	P. Vijayalakshmi	AIADMK	51,034	57.95	Srinivasan. K. P	DMK	35,061	39.81	15,973
Salem	91	Panamarathupatty	Rajaram. K	AIADMK	44,218	57.25	Santhanantham. P. M	INC	31,614	40.93	12,604
Salem	92	Attur	C. Palanimuthu	INC	38,416	53.44	Kandasami. P	AIADMK	31,525	43.85	6,891
Salem	93	Talavasal	Rajambal. T.	INC	38,217	52.4	Devarajan. M.	AIADMK	34,718	47.6	3,499
Salem	94	Rasipuram	Ramalingam. K. P	AIADMK	49,779	58.25	Muthu. P. T.	DMK	34,175	39.99	15,604
Salem	95	Sendamangalam	Sivaprakasam. S.	AIADMK	37,577	54.44	Vadama Gounder	INC	30,543	44.25	7,034
Salem	96	Namakkal	Arunachalam R.	AIADMK	42,850	51.78	Veluswamy K.	DMK	38,957	47.07	3,893
Salem	97	Kapilamalai	C. V. Velappan	AIADMK	39,224	45.11	Sengottaiyan. P.	INC	33,823	38.9	5,401
Salem	98	Tiruchengodu	Ponnaiyan. C.	AIADMK	69,122	55.34	Kaliyannan. T. M.	INC	52,046	41.67	17,076
Salem	99	Sankari	P. Dhanapal	AIADMK	45,664	56.61	Varadarajan. R.	DMK	33,109	41.04	12,555
Salem	100	Edapadi	I. Ganesan	AIADMK	37,978	38.93	Natarajan. T.	IND	32,159	32.97	5,819
Coimbatore	101	Mettupalayam	S. Palanisamy	AIADMK	48,266	58.96	Vijayan. K.	INC	32,311	39.47	15,955
Coimbatore	102	Avanashi	Arumugam. M.	CPI	33,294	54.22	Palanisamy. S. N.	INC	23,623	38.47	9,671
Coimbatore	103	Thondamuthur	Chinnaraj.	AIADMK	57,822	57.54	Manickkavachagam. R.	DMK	42,673	42.46	15,149
Coimbatore	104	Singanallur	Kulasekar. A. D.	DMK	44,523	45.16	Venkidu Alias Venkatasamy. R.	CPI(M)	41,302	41.9	3,221
Coimbatore	105	Coimbatore (West)	C. Aranganayagam	AIADMK	38,061	48.2	M. Ramanathan	DMK	35,634	45.13	2,427
Coimbatore	106	Coimbatore (East)	Ramani. K.	CPI(M)	33,666	45.39	Ganga Nair	INC	33,533	45.21	133
Coimbatore	107	Perur	Kovaithambi	AIADMK	47,308	48.04	Natarasan. A.	DMK	46,823	47.54	485
Coimbatore	108	Kinathukadavu	K. V. Kandaswamy	AIADMK	42,822	53.58	Doraiswamy. S. T.	INC	37,093	46.42	5,729
Coimbatore	109	Pollachi	M. V. Rathinam	AIADMK	52,833	56.61	M. Kannappan	DMK	39,797	42.64	13,036
Coimbatore	110	Valparai	A. T. Karuppiah	CPI	46,406	56.83	N. Kovaithangam	INC	33,354	40.85	13,052
Coimbatore	111	Udumalaipettai	P. Kolandaivelu	AIADMK	50,570	52.34	R. T. Mariyappan	DMK	46,049	47.66	4,521
Coimbatore	112	Dharapuram	Periasamy. A.	AIADMK	43,319	56.05	Palaniammal. V. P.	DMK	32,887	42.55	10,432
Coimbatore	113	Vellakoil	Ramasami. D.	AIADMK	56,975	62.63	M. Andi Ambalam	INC	36,859	52.46	20,116
Coimbatore	114	Pongalur	P. Kandaswamy	AIADMK	40,116	58.67	S. R. Balasubramaniam	INC	26,420	38.64	13,696
Coimbatore	115	Palladam	P. N. Paramasiva Gounder	AIADMK	40,305	48.36	K. N. Kumarasamy Gounder	INC	32,345	38.81	7,960
Coimbatore	116	Tiruppur	Manimaran. R.	AIADMK	63,371	56.98	Mohan Kandasamy Alias P. Kandasamy Gounder	INC	39,276	35.32	24,095
Coimbatore	117	Kangayam	Krishnaswamy. K. G.	AIADMK	45,950	56.1	Sivasabapathi. M.	DMK	34,341	41.92	11,609
Erode	118	Modakkurichi	Balakrishnan. S.	AIADMK	56,049	58.67	Ganesamoorthy. A.	DMK	38,402	40.2	17,647
Erode	119	Perundurai	Nallapan. T. K.	CPI	44,210	54.69	Jaganathan. N. K. P.	INC	32,543	40.26	11,667
Erode	120	Erode	S. Muthusamy	AIADMK	62,342	56.62	Sainathan. R.	INC	43,839	39.82	18,503
Erode	121	Bhavani	P. G. Narayanan	AIADMK	44,152	60.89	Madeswaran. M. P. V.	INC	22,926	31.61	21,226
Erode	122	Anthiyur	P. Guruswamy	AIADMK	34,498	57.06	Vadivel. T. G.	DMK	20,662	34.17	13,836
Erode	123	Gobichettipalayam	K. A. Sengottaiyan	AIADMK	44,703	59.38	Subramaniam. K. M.	INC	29,690	39.44	15,013
Erode	124	Bhavanisagar	Subramaniam. G. K.	AIADMK	38,557	48.28	Sampoornam Swamynathan.	DMK	27,852	34.88	10,705
Erode	125	Sathyamangalam	Rangasamy. R.	AIADMK	35,096	50.04	Rasappa. C. R.	INC	35,036	49.96	60
Nilgiris	126	Coonoor	Ranganathan. M.	DMK	34,424	56.85	Periasamy. C.	AIADMK	22,756	37.58	11,668
Nilgiris	127	Udhagamandalam	K. Kallan	INC	35,528	51.82	B. Gopalan	AIADMK	25,628	37.38	9,900
Nilgiris	128	Gudalur	K. Hutchi Gowder	DMK	36,780	58.39	Narayanan Nair. M. S.	CPI	23,636	37.52	13,144
Madurai	129	Palani	N. Palanivel	CPI(M)	41,874	53.12	Mani. S. R. P.	INC	35,646	45.22	6,228
Madurai	130	Oddanchatram	K. Kuppuswamy	AIADMK	35,269	45.26	Palaniswamy. S. K.	INC	23,882	30.65	11,387
Madurai	131	Periyakulam	Gopalakrishnan. K	AIADMK	43,774	54.01	Sheik Abdul Kader. K.	INC	34,938	43.11	8,836
Madurai	132	Theni	V. R. Jayaraman	AIADMK	51,534	55.44	Alagar Raja. N. R.	INC	41,415	44.56	10,119
Madurai	133	Bodinayakkanur	Subramanian. K. M. S.	AIADMK	50,972	59.77	Ramachandran. K. S. M.	INC	34,013	39.89	16,959
Madurai	134	Cumbum	Gopalan. R. T.	AIADMK	47,577	49.2	Cumbum Mahandiran. A. K.	DMK	35,395	36.6	12,182
Madurai	135	Andipatti	S. S. Rajendran	AIADMK	44,490	59.79	Kandasamy. K.	INC	16,508	22.18	27,982
Madurai	136	Sedapatti	Muthiah. R.	AIADMK	42,012	59.87	Thangarasan. R. S.	DMK	28,157	40.13	13,855
Madurai	137	Tirumangalam	N. S. V. Chitthan	INC	35,181	46.43	Perumal. A. R.	AIFB	31,679	41.81	3,502
Madurai	138	Usilampatti	Andi Thevar. S.	AIFB	33,857	47.67	Muthuramalingam. P. K. M.	IND	21,534	30.32	12,323
Madurai	139	Nilakottai	A. S. Ponnammal	IND	48,892	61.6	Manivasagam. A.	DMK	30,480	38.4	18,412
Madurai	140	Sholavandan	Chandrasekaran. A.	INC	41,720	50.28	Manian. P. S.	AIADMK	41,255	49.72	465
Madurai	141	Thiruparankundram	K. Kalimuthu	AIADMK	61,247	60.53	Seeni Thevar. P.	DMK	38,740	38.29	22,507
Madurai	142	Madurai West	M. G. Ramachandran	AIADMK	57,019	59.61	Pon. Muthuramalingam	DMK	35,953	37.59	21,066
Madurai	143	Madurai Central	Pazha Nedumara	IND	45,700	58.13	P. T. R. Palanivel Rajan	DMK	31,566	40.15	14,134
Madurai	144	Madurai East	N. Sankaraiah	CPI(M)	36,862	49.35	Ramamoorthy. M. A.	INC	30,923	41.4	5,939
Madurai	145	Samayanallur	Baluchamy. A.	AIADMK	50,612	53.61	Subashchandra Bose. P.	DMK	42,958	45.5	7,654
Madurai	146	Melur	Veeranambalam. K. V.	INC	54,003	54.6	Paramasivan. A. M.	AIADMK	41,849	42.31	12,154
Madurai	147	Natham	Alagarsamy. T.	IND	32,471	46.21	Somasundaram. A.	IND	509	0.72	31,962
Madurai	148	Dindigul	N. Varadarajan	IND	55,195	54.89	Abdul Khader. N.	INC	43,676	43.44	11,519
Madurai	149	Athoor	A. Vellaisamy	AIADMK	55,359	58.17	Rajambal	DMK	38,990	40.97	16,369
Madurai	150	Vedasandur	V. P. Balasubramanian	AIADMK	58,128	63.89	Raju. G. P. V.	INC	32,857	36.11	25,271
Tiruchirapalli	151	Aravakurichi	Sennimalai Alias. Kandahsamy P. S.	AIADMK	45,145	51.6	Shanmugam. K.	INC	40,233	45.99	4,912
Tiruchirapalli	152	Karur	M. Chinnasamy	AIADMK	54,331	50.79	S. Nallasamy	DMK	46,025	43.02	8,306
Tiruchirapalli	153	Krishnarayapuram	P. M. Thangavelraj	INC	43,623	55.33	Rengaraju. O.	AIADMK	34,584	43.86	9,039
Tiruchirapalli	154	Marungapuri	Raj Kumar. M. A.	AIADMK	32,021	41.98	Ramanathan. V.	INC	28,444	37.29	3,577
Tiruchirapalli	155	Kulithalai	Karuppaiah. R.	CPI	44,525	52.96	Srinivasa Reddiar. P. E.	INC	36,336	43.22	8,189
Tiruchirapalli	156	Thottiam	Periasami. R.	INC	37,426	42.89	Jayaraj. T. P. K.	IND	37,119	42.53	307
Tiruchirapalli	157	Uppiliapuram	Arengarajan. V.	AIADMK	43,263	49.46	Palanimuthu. R.	INC	40,997	46.87	2,266
Tiruchirapalli	158	Musiri	Rajamanickam. M. K.	AIADMK	53,697	52.2	Natarajan. R.	DMK	49,171	47.8	4,526
Tiruchirapalli	159	Lalgudi	Anbil P. Dharmalingam	DMK	40,899	40.9	Swamickan. A.	IND	38,099	38.1	2,800
Tiruchirapalli	160	Perambalur	J. S. Raju	DMK	28,680	40.98	Angamuthu. M.	AIADMK	24,224	34.62	4,456
Tiruchirapalli	161	Varahur	Perumal. N.	AIADMK	39,476	53.27	Chinnaian. P.	INC	33,277	44.9	6,199
Tiruchirapalli	162	Ariyalur	T. Arumugam	DMK	45,980	52.53	Asokan.	AIADMK	36,776	42.01	9,204
Tiruchirapalli	163	Andimadam	S. Krishnamoorthy	AIADMK	36,120	50.49	Sivasubramanian. S.	DMK	35,412	49.51	708
Tiruchirapalli	164	Jayankondam	Thangavelu. P.	INC	39,862	45.76	Selvarajan. T.	AIADMK	34,955	40.13	4,907
Tiruchirapalli	165	Srirangam	R. Soudararajan	AIADMK	49,160	53.48	Swaminathan. V.	INC	42,761	46.52	6,399
Tiruchirapalli	166	Tiruchirappalli I	Musiri Putthan. P.	AIADMK	35,361	49.68	Krishnamurthi. A. V.	DMK	33,183	46.62	2,178
Tiruchirapalli	167	Tiruchirappalli Ii	K. Soundararajan	AIADMK	43,029	55.52	Kader Mohideen. M. K.	IND	34,467	44.48	8,562
Tiruchirapalli	168	Thiruverumbur	Gurusamy Alias Annadasan. N.	AIADMK	51,012	56.24	Murugesan. K. S.	DMK	39,047	43.05	11,965
Thanjavur	169	Sirkazhi	K. Balasubramanian	AIADMK	49,334	57.78	K. Subravelu	DMK	36,054	42.22	13,280
Thanjavur	170	Poompuhar	Vijayabalan. N.	AIADMK	45,292	53.36	Ganesan. S.	DMK	39,587	46.64	5,705
Thanjavur	171	Mayiladuthurai	N. Kittappa	DMK	37,671	48.89	Bala Velayutham	AIADMK	37,001	48.03	670
Thanjavur	172	Kuttalam	Rajamanickam. R.	DMK	44,254	53.39	Veeraiyan. G.	CPI(M)	33,364	40.25	10,890
Thanjavur	173	Nannilam	Kalaiarasan. A.	AIADMK	44,829	52.73	M. Manimaran	DMK	39,689	46.69	5,140
Thanjavur	174	Thiruvarur	M. Sellamuthu	CPI(M)	45,557	50.18	Kuppusamy. Kovi	DMK	43,959	48.42	1,598
Thanjavur	175	Nagapattinam	R. Umanath	CPI(M)	44,105	51.38	Ramanatha Thevar. S. S. R.	INC	41,738	48.62	2,367
Thanjavur	176	Vedaranyam	M. S. Manickam	AIADMK	52,311	60.86	M. Meenakshi Sundaram	DMK	32,656	37.99	19,655
Thanjavur	177	Thiruthuraipoondi	P. Uthirapathy	CPI(M)	62,051	61.2	V. Vedaiyan	INC	39,345	38.8	22,706
Thanjavur	178	Mannargudi	M. Ambigapathi	CPI	51,818	56.33	Gopalasamy Thenkondar M.	INC	33,496	36.41	18,322
Thanjavur	179	Pattukkottai	Somasundaram. S. D.	AIADMK	52,900	54.96	Marimuthu. A. R.	INC	42,302	43.95	10,598
Thanjavur	180	Peravurani	Govendan. M. R.	AIADMK	56,010	58.56	Palanivel. A.	INC	39,633	41.44	16,377
Thanjavur	181	Orathanadu	T. Veeraswamy	INC	47,021	50.53	T.M. Thailappan	AIADMK	45,402	48.79	1,619
Thanjavur	182	Thiruvonam	Sivagnanam. N.	INC	44,748	49.36	Durai Govindarajan	AIADMK	44,686	49.29	62
Thanjavur	183	Thanjavur	S. Natarajan	DMK	40,880	50.61	Ramamurthy. A.	IND	39,901	49.39	979
Thanjavur	184	Thiruvaiyaru	Subramanian. M.	AIADMK	42,636	55.14	Elangovan. G.	DMK	32,967	42.64	9,669
Thanjavur	185	Papanasam	S. Rajaraman	INC	36,101	50.3	Narayanaswamy. Govi	AIADMK	33,152	46.19	2,949
Thanjavur	186	Valangiman	Gomathy	AIADMK	40,667	56.11	Chellappa. A.	DMK	29,502	40.7	11,165
Thanjavur	187	Kumbakonam	Pakeer Mohamed. E. S. M.	INC	45,038	55.98	Eradha. S. R.	AIADMK	35,415	44.02	9,623
Thanjavur	188	Thiruvidaimarudur	Ramalingam. S.	DMK	46,943	53.31	Rajamaniekam. K.	AIADMK	41,111	46.69	5,832
Pudukottai	189	Thirumayam	Sundararaj. N.	INC	39,479	45.72	Pulavar Ponnambalam	AIADMK	39,256	45.46	223
Pudukottai	190	Kolathur	Marimuthu. T.	AIADMK	50,810	57.25	Thamizhselvan. A. Keerai.	DMK	37,200	41.91	13,610
Pudukottai	191	Pudukkottai	Rajakumar Vijaya Raghunatha Thondaiman	INC	47,660	49.71	Subbiah. K. R.	CPI	46,387	48.38	1,273
Pudukottai	192	Alangudi	P. Thirumaran	AIADMK	59,206	55.33	T. Pushparaju	INC	44,605	41.68	14,601
Pudukottai	193	Aranthangi	Su. Thirunavukkarasar	AIADMK	50,792	49.5	Mohamed Mashood. M.	IND	36,519	35.59	14,273
Ramanathapuram	194	Tiruppattur (Sivaganga)	Valmigi. V.	INC	34,342	42	Madhavan. S.	IND	20,116	24.6	14,226
Ramanathapuram	195	Karaikudi	Chidambaram. C. T.	DMK	46,541	51.78	Kaliappan. P.	AIADMK	42,648	47.45	3,893
Ramanathapuram	196	Tiruvadanai	Anguchamy. S.	AIADMK	34,392	37.96	Ramanathan Thevar. A. T. M.	INC	32,406	35.77	1,986
Ramanathapuram	197	Ilayangudi	Sivasamy. S.	CPI	34,437	46.51	Malaikkannan. V.	DMK	34,381	46.43	56
Ramanathapuram	198	Sivaganga	O. Subramanian	INC	41,327	56.94	Natarajasamy. N.	IND	29,875	41.16	11,452
Ramanathapuram	199	Manamadurai	K. Paramalai	IND	38,435	50.52	Krishnan. U.	INC	36,824	48.4	1,611
Ramanathapuram	200	Paramakudi	R. Thavasi	AIADMK	43,710	54.22	Elamaran. A.	DMK	34,876	43.26	8,834
Ramanathapuram	201	Ramanathapuram	T. Ramasamy	AIADMK	46,987	57.63	Zeenath Sheriffdeen	INC	32,755	40.18	14,232
Ramanathapuram	202	Kadaladi	S. Sathiamoorthy	AIADMK	40,246	51.41	Abdul Cadir. T. S. O.	IND	37,010	47.28	3,236
Ramanathapuram	203	Mudukulathur	C. Dinesh Thevar	IND	42,711	51.43	Balakrishnan. S.	INC	37,175	44.77	5,536
Ramanathapuram	204	Aruppukottai	M. Pitchai	AIADMK	42,589	53.67	V. Thangapandian	DMK	30,904	38.95	11,685
Ramanathapuram	205	Sattur	K. K. S. S. R. Ramachandran	AIADMK	54,720	55.1	Saudi Sundara Barati. S.	DMK	43,795	44.1	10,925
Ramanathapuram	206	Virudhunagar	M. Sundararajan	AIADMK	40,285	48.86	P. Seenivasan	DMK	29,665	35.98	10,620
Ramanathapuram	207	Sivakasi	V. Balakrishnan	AIADMK	53,081	61.32	S. Alagu Thevar	DMK	27,348	31.59	25,733
Ramanathapuram	208	Srivilliputhur	R. Thamaraikani	AIADMK	46,882	52.36	Karruppiah Thevar P.	INC	29,216	32.63	17,666
Ramanathapuram	209	Rajapalayam	P. Mokkian	IND	38,339	44.07	Pottu Pottan K.	INC	29,758	34.2	8,581
Tirunelveli	210	Vilathikulam	Perumal R. K.	AIADMK	40,728	53.75	Kumaragurubara Ramanathan S.	DMK	34,088	44.99	6,640
Tirunelveli	211	Ottapidaram	Appadurai. M.	CPI	33,071	52.11	Veluchami. O. S.	INC	30,393	47.89	2,678
Tirunelveli	212	Kovilpatti	Alagarasamy. S.	CPI	39,442	51.37	Jeyalakshmi. V.	INC	30,792	40.11	8,650
Tirunelveli	213	Sankarankoil	P. Durairaj	AIADMK	31,818	48.87	Madan. K.	DMK	29,436	45.21	2,382
Tirunelveli	214	Vasudevanallur	R. Krishnan	CPI(M)	33,107	50.51	Eswaran. R.	INC	29,921	45.65	3,186
Tirunelveli	215	Kadayanallur	A. Shahul Hameed	IND	38,225	50.71	Gani A. M. Alias Mohideen Pitchai. A.	AIADMK	36,354	48.23	1,871
Tirunelveli	216	Tenkasi	A. K. Sattanatha Karayalar	AIADMK	36,638	49.88	Ramanan Alias Venkataramanan. T. R.	INC	35,963	48.96	675
Tirunelveli	217	Alangulam	Navaneetha Krishna Pandian. R.	GKC	41,271	53.88	Dorai Singh. E.	DMK	34,587	45.15	6,684
Tirunelveli	218	Tirunelveli	V. R. Nedunchezhiyan	AIADMK	48,338	57.96	Rajathi Kunchithapatham	INC	34,142	40.94	14,196
Tirunelveli	219	Palayamkottai	V. Karuppasamy Pandian	AIADMK	45,049	57.96	Seetharaman. Suba	DMK	32,680	42.04	12,369
Tirunelveli	220	Cheranmahadevi	P. H. Pandian	AIADMK	42,793	57.62	Ratnasabhapathy. V.	INC	30,683	41.31	12,110
Tirunelveli	221	Ambasamudram	Easwarmoorthy (Soranam)	CPI(M)	31,262	47.39	Sangumuthu Thevarm S.	INC	26,975	40.89	4,287
Tirunelveli	222	Nanguneri	M. John Vincent	AIADMK	36,725	52.18	Thangaraj. J.	INC	32,676	46.43	4,049
Tirunelveli	223	Radhapuram	E. Muthuramalingam	GKC	38,044	53.95	Nellai Nedumaran	DMK	31,408	44.54	6,636
Tirunelveli	224	Sattangulam	Ramasamy. S. N.	GKC	24,700	41.24	Dhanuskodi Athithan. R.	INC	23,688	39.55	1,012
Tirunelveli	225	Tiruchendur	Kesava Athithan. S.	AIADMK	35,499	49.49	Samsudin Alias Kathiravan	DMK	34,294	47.81	1,205
Tirunelveli	226	Srivaikuntam	Ramasubramanian. E.	AIADMK	26,502	38.99	Shanmugam. V.	INC	24,404	35.91	2,098
Tirunelveli	227	Thoothukkudi	Rajendran. S. N.	AIADMK	54,171	57.61	Krishnan. R.	DMK	39,365	41.86	14,806
Kanyakumari	228	Kanniyakumari	S. Muthukrishnan	AIADMK	35,613	47.58	Mathevan Pillai. A.	INC	28,515	38.1	7,098
Kanyakumari	229	Nagercoil	Vincent. M.	AIADMK	39,328	54.76	Thiraviam. A.	DMK	30,045	41.83	9,283
Kanyakumari	230	Colachel	S. Retnaraj	DMK	42,949	67.03	Sanotsham. M.	AIADMK	21,127	32.97	21,822
Kanyakumari	231	Padmanabhapuram	P. Mohammad Ismail	JP	19,758	37.27	Lawrence. K.	GKC	17,434	32.88	2,324
Kanyakumari	232	Thiruvattar	Hemachandran J.	CPI(M)	29,463	47.71	Thobias P.	INC	17,099	27.69	12,364
Kanyakumari	233	Vilavancode	Moni D.	CPI(M)	34,170	53.66	Davis Raj P.	DMK	25,348	39.81	8,822
Kanyakumari	234	Killiyoor	P. Vijayaraghavan	JP	31,521	54.28	Russel Raj C.	DMK	16,691	28.74	14,830

== M. G. R.'s Second Cabinet ==
After the Seventh General Elections held in 1980, a new Ministry with Dr. M. G. Ramachandran as Chief Ministers was formed on the noon of 9 June 1980. The names of the Ministers with their portfolios are given below:

S.no	Name	Constituency	Designation	Portfolios	Party
Chief Minister
1.	Dr. M. G. Ramachandran	Madurai (West)	Chief Minister	Public; General Administration; Indian Administrative Service; District Revenue Officers; Deputy Collector; Police; Prevention of Corruption; Public Works Department.	AIADMK
Cabinet Ministers
2.	Dr. V. R. Nedunchezhiyan	Tirunelveli	Minister for Finance Minister	Planning; Legislature; Elections; Food; Fisheries; Backward Classes; Youth Service Corps; Price Control; Ex-Servicemen	AIADMK
3.	S. Ramachandran	Panruti	Minister for Electricity	Electricity; Iron and Steel control	AIADMK
4.	K. A. Krishnaswamy	Thousand Lights	Minister for Rural Industries-Minister	Rural Industries; Village; Cottage and Small Industries; Milk, Dairy Development; Registration	AIADMK
5.	S. D. Somasundaram	Pattukkottai	Minister for Revenue; Minister for Prohibition and Excise	Revenue; Commercial Taxes; Excise and Census	AIADMK
6.	R. M. Veerappan		Minister for Information and religious Endowments,	Information and Publicity; Film Technology; Tourism; Tourism Development Corporation; Cinematograph Act; Hindu Religious and Charitable Endowments; Forest and Cinchona; Grant of Liquor Permits; Minerals.	AIADMK
7.	C. Aranganayagam	Coimbatore (South)	Minister for Education	Education including Technical Education; Official Language	AIADMK
8.	K. Kalimuthu	Thiruparankundram	Minister for Agriculture	Agriculture; Agricultural Refinance; Agricultural Engineering wing; Agro-Engineering	AIADMK
9.	C. Ponnaiyan	Tiruchengode	Minister for Co-operation and Law-Minister	Law; Courts; Prisons; Legislation on Weights and Measures; Registration of companies; Debt Relief including legislation on Money lending; Chits and Registration of Companies	AIADMK
10.	P. Kolandaivelu	Udumalaipettai	Minister for Local Administration-Minister	Municipal Administration; Panchayats and Panchayat Unions; Community Development; Rural Indebtedness; Bhoodan and Gramdhan; Highways	AIADMK
11.	S. Raghavanandam		Minister for Labour	Labour; Housing; Slum Clearance Board; Statistics; Tamil Nadu Water Supply and Drainage Board; Town Planning and Accommodation control	AIADMK
12.	Dr. H. V. Hande		Minister for Health-Minister	Health.	AIADMK
13.	K. Raja Mohammed		Minister for Irrigation-Minister	Agro Service cooperative societies; Irrigation; Minor Irrigation; Wakf	AIADMK
14.	S. Muthusamy	Erode	Minister for Transport	Transport; Nationalized Transport; Motor Vehicles Act; Ports	AIADMK
15.	Su. Thirunavukkarasar	Arantangi	Minister for Industries	Large scale Industries; Mines and Textiles	AIADMK
16.	S. N. Rajendran	Thoothukkudi	Minister for Handlooms and Khadi-Minister	Handlooms; Khadi; Prohibition excluding grant of liquor permits and passports	AIADMK
17.	M. Vijayasarathy	Arakkonam (SC)	Minister for Harijan Welfare-Minister	Harijan Welfare; Stationery and Printing; Government Press; News Print control; Hill Tribes and Bonded Labour; Employment and Training	AIADMK
18.	Gomathi Srinivasan	Valangiman (SC)	Minister for Social Welfare-Minister	Social Welfare; Women and Children Welfare; Animal Husbandry; Beggars Home; Orphanages; Indian Overseas; Refugees and evacuees; Correctional Administration	AIADMK

Thiruvalargal S.R. Eradha and M.R. Govendan and Selvi P. Vijayalakhsmi were appointed as additional Members of the Council of Ministers with effect from 1 July 1983. Consequently the business of the Government was re-allocated among the Ministers as follows with effect from 1 July 1983:

1. Thiru M. G. Ramachandran, Chief Minister-Minister in-charge of Public, General Administration, Indian administrative Service, District Revenue Officers, Deputy Collectors, Police, Prevention of corruption, Planning Molasses and Archaeology.
2. Thiru (Dr.). V. R. Nedunchezhiyan, Minister for Finance-Minister-in-charge of Finance, Legislature, Elections, Food, Youth Service Corps, Price Control and exservicemen.
3. Thiru S. Ramachandran, Minister for Electricity-Minister-in-charge of Electricity, Iron and Steel control.
4. Thiru K. A. Krishnasamy, Minister for Rural Industries-Minister-in-charge of Rural Industries including Village, Cottage and small Industries, Milk Dairy development, Registration and Stamp Act.
5. Thiru S. D. Somasundaram, Minister for Revenue-Minister-in-charge of Revenue, Commercial Taxes, Excise and Census.
6. Thiru R. M. Veerappan, Minister for Information and Religious Endowments Minister-in-charge of Information and Publicity, Film Technology, Tourism, Tourism Development corporation, Cinchona and Grant of Liquor Permits.
7. Thiru C. Arangayagam, Minister for Education-Minister-in-charge of Education including Technical education, Official Language and Handlooms.
8. Thiru K. Kalimuthu, Minister for Agriculture-Minister-in-charge of Agriculture, Agricultural Refinance, Agricultural Engineering Wing and Agro-Engineering
9. Thiru C. Ponnaiyan, Minister for Co-operation and Law-Minister-in-charge of Law, Courts, Prisons, Legislation on Weights and Measures, Registration of companies, Debt Relief including Legislation on Money Lending and Legislation on Chits and Co-operation.
10. Thiru P. Kulandaivelu, Minister for Local Administration-Minister-in-charge of Municipal Administration, Panchayats, and Panchayat Unions, Community Development, Rural Indebtedness Bhoodan and Gramdhan and Highways.
11. Thiru S. Raghavanandham, Minister for Labour-Minister-in-charge of Labour, Housing, slum-clearance Board, Statistics, Tamil Nadu water Supply and Drainage Board, Town Planning and Accommodation Control
12. Thiru (Dr.) H. V. Hande, Minister for Health-Minister-in-charge of Health.
13. Thiru K. Raja Mohammed, Minister for Irrigation-Minister-in-charge of AgroService, Co-operative Societies, Irrigation including Minor Irrigation and Wakf.
14. Thiru S. Muthusamy, Minister for transport-Minister-in-charge of Transport, Nationalised Transport, Motor Vehicles Act and Ports.
15. Thiru S. Thirunavukkarasu, Minister for Industries-Minister-in-charge of Large Scale Industries, Mines and Minerals and Textiles.
16. Thiru S. N. Rajendran, Minister for Public works-Minister-in-charge of Prohibition excluding grant of liquor permits, Passports, P.W.D. and Establishment matters relating to public Works Department.
17. Thiru M. Vijayasarathi, Minister for Adi-Dravidar Welfare-Minister-in-charge of Adi-Dravidar Welfare, Stationery and Printing, Government Press, News Print control, Hilo Tribes and Bonded Labour and Employment Training.
18. Thiru S. R. Eradha, Minister for Fisheries-Minister-in-charge of Fisheries.
19. Thiru M. R. Govendan, Minister for Backward Classes: Minister-in-charge of Backward Classes.
20. Thirumathi Gomathi Sainivasan, Minister for Social Welfare: Minister-in charge of Social welfare including women and Children welfare, Animal Husbandry, Beggars Home, Orphanages, Indian Overseas, Refugees and Evacuees and Correctional Administration.
21. Selvi P. Vijayalakshmi, Minister for Khadi-Minister-in-charge of Khadi. Thiru K. Raja Mohammed ceased to be a Member of the Council of Ministers and Tvl.

R. Soundararajan, Y. S. M. Yusuf, R Arunachalam and K.Kalaimani were appointed as additional Members of the Council of Minister with effect from 9 September 1983. Consequently the business of the Government was re-allocated among the Ministers as follows with effect from 9 September 1983:

1. Thiru (Dr). M. G. Ramachandran, Chief Minister-Minister-in-charge of Public, General Administration, Indian Administrative Service and Other All India Services, District Revenue Officers, Deputy Collectors, Police, Prevention of Corruption, Planning, Molasses, Archaeology and Excise.
2. Thiru (Dr). V. R. Nedunchezhiyan, Minister for Finance-Minister-in-charge of Finance. Legislature, Election, Food, Youth Service Corps, Price Control and Ex-servicemen.
3. Thiru S. Ramafhandran, Minister for Electricity-Minister-in-charge of Electricity, Iron and Steel Control.
4. Thiru K. A. Krishnaswamy, Minister for Dairy Development-Minister-in-charge of Milk, Dairy Development, Registration and Stamp Act.
5. Thiru S. D. Somasundaran, Minister for Revenue. Minister-in-charge of Revenue, Commercial Taxes and Census.
6. Thiru R. M. Veerappan, Minister for Information and Religious Endowments. Minister-in-charge of Information and Publicity Film Technology, Tourism, Tourism Development Corporation, Cinematograph Act, Hindu Religious and Charitable Endowments, Forest, Cinchona and Grant of Liquor Permits.
7. Thiru C. Aranganayagam, Minister for Education: Minister-in-charge of Education Including Technical Education Official Language, and Handlooms.
8. Thiru K. Kalimuhth, Minister for Agriculture: Ministers in Charge of Agriculture, Agricultural Refinance, Agricultural Engineering Wing and Agro Engineering.
9. Thiru C. Ponnaiyan, Minister for Co-operation and Law: Ministers in Charge of Law, Courts Prisons, Legislation on Weights and Measures, Registration of Companies, Debt Relief Including Legislation on Money Lending and Legislation on Chits and Co-operation.
10. Thiru P. Kulandaivelu, Minister for Local Administration: Minister in Charge of Municipal Administration, Panchayats and Panchayat Union, Community Development, Rural Indebtedness, Bhodhan and Gramphan and Highway.
11. Thiru S. Raghavanandham, Minister for Labour: Minister in Charge of Labour, Housing, Slum Clearance Board, Statistics, Tamil Nadu Water Supply and Drainage Board, Town Planning and Accommodation Control:
12. Thiru (Dr.) H. V. Hande, Minister for Health: Minister in Charge of Health.
13. Thiru S. Muhtusamy, Minister for Transport: Minister in Charge of Transport, Nationalised Transport Motor Vehicles Act and Ports.
14. Thiru S. Thirunavukkarasu, Minister for Industries: Minister in Charge of Large Scale Industries Mines and Minerals and Textiles.
15. Thiru S. N. Rajendran, Minister for Public Works: Minister in charge of Prohibition excluding grant of Liquor permits, Passports, P.W.D. and Establishment matters relating to Public Works Department.
16. Thiru M. Vijayasarathi, Minister for Adi-dravidar Welfare. Minister in Charge of Adi-dravidar Welfare, Stationery and Printing, Government Press, News Print Control, Hill Tribes and Bonded Labour and Employment Training.
17. Thiru R. Soundararajan, Minister for Nutritious Meals: Minister in Charge of Nutritious Meals.
18. Thiru S. R. Eradha, Minister for Environmental Pollution Control. Minister in Charge of Environmental Pollution Control.
19. Thiru M. R. Govendan, Minister for Backward Classes. Minister in Charge of Backward Classes.
20. Thirumathi Gomathi Srinivasan, Minister for Social Welfare. Minister in Charge of Social Welfare Including Women and Children Welfare, Animal Husbandry, Beggars Home, Orphanages, Indian Overseas, Refugees and Evacuees and Correctional Administration.
21. Thirumathi Vijayalakshmi Palanisamy, Minister for Khadi. Minister in Charge of Khadi.
22. Thiru Y. S. M. Yusuf, Minister for Irrigation and Wakf. Minister in Charge of Agro Services Co-operative Societies, Irrigation Including Minor Irrigation and Wakf.
23. Thiru R. Arunachalam, Minister for Rural Industries-Minister in Charge of Rural Industries Including Village, Cottage and Small Industries.
24. Thiru K. Kalaimani, Minister for Fisheries. Minister in Charge of Fisheries.

Thiruvalargal T. Veerasamy and K.K.S.S.R. Ramachandran were appointed as additional Members of the Council of Ministers with effect from 5 September 1984. The business of the Government was re-allocated among the Ministers as follows with effect from 5 September 1984.

1. Thiru (Dr.) M. G. Ramachandran Chief Minister, Minister in Charge of Public, General Administration, Indian Administrative Service and Other All India Services, District Revenue Officers, Deputy Collectors, Police, Prevention of Corruption, Planning, Molasses Archaeology, Prohibition Excluding Grant of Liquor Permits, Electronics, Science and Technology.
2. Thiru (Dr.) V. R. Nedunchezhiyan, Minister for Finance. Minister in Charge of Finance, Revenue, Legislature, Elections, Youth Service Corps, and Ex-servicemen.
3. Thiru S. Ramachandran, Minister for Electricity. Minister in Charge of Electricity, Iron and Steel Control.
4. Thiru K. A. Krishnasamy, Minister for Dairy Development. Minister in Charge of Milk, Dairy Development, Registration and Stamp Act.
5. Thiru R. M. Veerappan, Minister for Information and Religious Endowments. Minister in Charge of Information and Publicity, Film Technology, Tourism, Tourism Development Corporation, Cinematograph Act, Hindu Religious and Charitable Endowments, Forest, Cinchona and Grant of Liquor Permits.
6. Thiru C. Aranganayagam, Minister for Education. Minister in Charge of Education and Official Language.
7. Thiru (Dr.) K. Kalimuthu, Minister for Agriculture. Minister in Charge of Agriculture, Agricultural Refinance, Agricultural Engineering Wing and Agro-engineering.
8. Thiru C. Ponnaiyan, Minister for Law and Industries. Minister in Charge of Law, Courts, Prisons, Legislation on Weights and Measures, Registration of Companies, Debt Relief Including Legislation on Money Lending and Legislation on Chits, Large Scale Industries, Mines and Minerals.
9. Thiru P. Kulandaivelu, Minister for Nutritious Meals-Minister in Charge of Nutritious Meals, Bhoodan and Gramdhan and Highways.
10. Thiru S. Raghavanandham, Minister for Labour-Minister in Charge of Labour, Statistics, Tamil Nadu Water Supply and Drainage Board, Town Planning and Accommodation Control.
11. Thiru (Dr.) H. V. Hande, Minister for Health. Minister in Charge of Health.
12. Thiru S. Muthusamy, Minister for Transport-Minister in Charge of Transport, Nationalised Transport, Motor Vehicles Act and Ports.
13. Thiru S. Thirunavukkarasu, Minister for Commercial Taxes and Handloomsminister in Charge of Commercial Taxes, Excise, Handlooms and Textiles.
14. Thiru S. Rajendran, Minister for Environmental Pollution Control-Minister in Charge of Environmental Pollution Control and Passport.
15. Thiru M. Vijayasarathi, Minister for Adi-drav9dar Welfare-Minister in Charge of Adi-dravidar Welfare, Stationery and Printing, Government Press, News Print Control, Hill Tribes and Bonded Labour and Employment Training.
16. Thiru R. Soundararajan, Minister for Local Administration-Minister in Charge of Municipal Administration, Panchayats and Panchayat Unions, Community Development And\ Rural Indebtedness.
17. Thiru S. R. Eradha, Minister for Public Works-Minister in Charge of Housing, Slum Clearance Board, Public Works Department and Establishment Matters Relating to Public Works Department.
18. Thiru M. R. Govendan, Minister for Backward Classes-Minister in Charge of Backward Classes.
19. Thirmathi Gomathi Srinivasan, Minister for Social Welfare-Minister in Charge of Social Welfare Including Women and Children Welfare, Animal Husbandry, Beggars Home, Orphanages, Indians Overseas, Refugees and Evacuees and Correctional Administration.
20. Thirumathi Vijayalakshmi Palanisamy, Minister for Khadi-Minister in Charge of Khadi.
21. Thiru Y. S. M. Yusuf, Minister for Irrigation and Wakf-Minister in Charge of Agro Service Co-operative Societies, Irrigation Including Minor Irrigation and Wakf.
22. Thiru R. Arunachalam, Minister for Rural Industries-Minister in Charge of Rural Industries Including Village, Cottage and Small Industries.
23. Thiru K. Kalaimani, Minister for Fisheries-Minister in Charge of Fisheries.
24. Thiru T. Veeraswamy, Minister for Food-Minister in Charge of Food, Price Control and Census.
25. Thiru K. K. S. S. R. Ramachandran, Minister for Co-operation-Minister in Charge of Co-operation.

== See also ==
- Elections in Tamil Nadu
- Legislature of Tamil Nadu
- Government of Tamil Nadu
