= Arunachala Thevar =

Indian politician

Arunachala Thevar was an Indian politician and former Member of the Legislative Assembly of Tamil Nadu.He was lived in small village Poongudi, Pudukkottai district. He was elected to the Tamil Nadu legislative assembly as an Indian National Congress (INC) candidate from Alangudi constituency in 1957 election. Chinniah from INC was the other winner from the same constituency.
