= P. Mokkian =

Indian politician

P. Mokkian was an Indian politician and former Member of the Legislative Assembly of Tamil Nadu. He was elected to the Tamil Nadu Legislative Assembly as an Independent candidate from Rajapalayam constituency in 1980 election.
