= K. V. Subbiah =

Indian politician

Member of the Tamil Nadu Legislative Assembly
- In office 1967 - 1972; 1971 - 1976
- Constituency: Alangudi

Personal details
- Political party: Dravida Munnetra Kazhagam

K. V. Subbiah was an Indian politician and former Member of the Legislative Assembly of Tamil Nadu. He was elected to the Tamil Nadu legislative assembly as a Dravida Munnetra Kazhagam candidate from Alangudi constituency in 1967 and 1971 elections
