= Rajapalayam Assembly constituency =

One of the 234 State Legislative Assembly Constituencies in Tamil Nadu, in India

Coordinates: 9°27′0″N 77°33′0″E

Rajapalayam
- Constituency No. 202 for the Tamil Nadu Legislative Assembly

Constituency details
- Country: India
- Region: South India
- State: Tamil Nadu
- District: Virudhunagar
- Lok Sabha constituency: Tenkasi
- Established: 1962
- Total electors: 214,192

Member of Legislative Assembly
- 17th Tamil Nadu Legislative Assembly
- Incumbent Jegadeshwari. K.
- Party: TVK
- Elected year: 2026

Rajapalayam is an assembly constituency located in Virudhunagar district in Tamil Nadu. It falls under Tenkasi Lok Sabha constituency. It is one of the 234 State Legislative Assembly Constituencies in Tamil Nadu, in India.

== Members of Legislative Assembly ==
Year	Member	Political party
Madras State
1962	R. Krishnasamy Naidu	Indian National Congress
1967	A. A. S. Raja	Independent
Tamil Nadu
1971	K. Suppu	Communist Party of India
1977	K. Dhanuskodi	All India Anna Dravida Munnetra Kazhagam
1980	P. Mokkian	Independent
1984	K. Raman	Indian National Congress
1989	V. P. Rajan	Dravida Munnetra Kazhagam
1991	T. Sathiah	All India Anna Dravida Munnetra Kazhagam
1996	V. P. Rajan	Dravida Munnetra Kazhagam
2001	M. Rajasekar	All India Anna Dravida Munnetra Kazhagam
2006	M. Chandra	All India Anna Dravida Munnetra Kazhagam
2011	K. Gopalsamy	All India Anna Dravida Munnetra Kazhagam
2016	S. Thangappandian	Dravida Munnetra Kazhagam
2021	S. Thangappandian	Dravida Munnetra Kazhagam
2026	K. Jegadeshwari	Tamilaga Vettri Kazhagam

Rajapalayam Assembly constituency was absorbed into Tenkasi Lok Sabha constituency in 2008, for the 2009 election onwards.

== Election results ==
Vote share of winning candidates
2026	35.81%
2021	41.50%
2016	43.82%
2011	53.80%
2006	39.37%
2001	47.63%
1996	38.62%
1991	63.45%
1989	40.75%
1984	54.49%
1980	44.07%
1977	37.55%
1971	50.45%
1967	53.29%
1962	51.73%

=== 2026 ===
2026 Tamil Nadu Legislative Assembly election: Rajapalayam
Party	Candidate	Votes	%	±%
TVK	Jegadeshwari. K.	65,548	35.81	New
DMK	Thangapandian S	54,943	30.02	▼11.92
BJP	Priscilla Pandian J	36,318	19.84	
NTK	Dr Karthikeyan T E	16,972	9.27	▲0.45
NOTA	NOTA	753	0.41	
Margin of victory		10,605	5.79	
Turnout				
Rejected ballots				
Registered electors		212,220		
TVK gain from DMK		Swing		

=== 2021 ===
2021 Tamil Nadu Legislative Assembly election: Rajapalayam
Party	Candidate	Votes	%	±%
DMK	S. Thangappandian	74,158	41.94	−1.88
AIADMK	K. T. Rajenthra Bhalaji	70,260	39.73	−1.27
NTK	V. Jeyaraj	15,601	8.82	+7.41
AMMK	K. Kalimuthu	7,664	4.33	New
MNM	S. Vivekananthan	4,057	2.29	New
PT	V. K. Ayyar	3,384	1.91	New
NOTA	NOTA	1,875	1.06	−0.28
Margin of victory		3,898	2.20	−0.61
Turnout		176,833	73.85	−2.22
Rejected ballots		288	0.16	
Registered electors		239,461		
DMK hold		Swing	-1.88	

=== 2016 ===
2016 Tamil Nadu Legislative Assembly election: Rajapalayam
Party	Candidate	Votes	%	±%
DMK	S. Thangappandian	74,787	43.82	+4.4
AIADMK	A. A. S. Shyam	69,985	41.00	−12.8
CPI(M)	A. Gurusamy	12,505	7.33	New
BJP	A. N. Ramachandra Raja	3,435	2.01	−1.63
NTK	V. Jeyaraj	2,414	1.41	New
NOTA	NOTA	2,290	1.34	New
PMK	P. Lakshmanan	1,073	0.63	New
Independent	I. Jeyaprakash	919	0.54	New
Margin of victory		4,802	2.81	−11.58
Turnout		170,688	76.06	−4.18
Registered electors		224,407		
DMK gain from AIADMK		Swing	-9.99	

=== 2011 ===
2011 Tamil Nadu Legislative Assembly election: Rajapalayam
Party	Candidate	Votes	%	±%
AIADMK	K. Gopalsamy	80,125	53.80	+14.43
DMK	S. Thangappandian	58,693	39.41	+0.37
BJP	N. S. Ramakrishnan	5,428	3.64	+2.54
Margin of victory		21,432	14.39	14.06
Turnout		148,925	80.24	6.47
Registered electors		185,596		
AIADMK hold		Swing	14.43	

=== 2006 ===
2006 Tamil Nadu Legislative Assembly election: Rajapalayam
Party	Candidate	Votes	%	±%
AIADMK	M. Chandra	58,320	39.37	−8.25
DMK	V. P. Rajan	57,827	39.04	−1.18
BSP	P. Kalimuthu	13,218	8.92	New
DMDK	N. Ayyanar	10,251	6.92	New
AIFB	R. Vijayakumari	4,082	2.76	New
BJP	M. Chellapandi	1,640	1.11	New
Independent	P. Muniasamy	1,210	0.82	New
Margin of victory		493	0.33	−7.07
Turnout		148,122	73.77	9.88
Registered electors		200,783		
AIADMK hold		Swing	-8.25	

=== 2001 ===
2001 Tamil Nadu Legislative Assembly election: Rajapalayam
Party	Candidate	Votes	%	±%
AIADMK	M. Rajasekar	61,740	47.63	+23.64
DMK	V. P. Rajan	52,145	40.23	+1.61
MDMK	P. Ramanathan	12,613	9.73	−4.07
Independent	M. Vellaichamy	1,280	0.99	New
Independent	T. Ramachandran	736	0.57	New
Margin of victory		9,595	7.40	−7.23
Turnout		129,633	63.89	−6.63
Registered electors		203,123		
AIADMK gain from DMK		Swing	9.01	

=== 1996 ===
1996 Tamil Nadu Legislative Assembly election: Rajapalayam
Party	Candidate	Votes	%	±%
DMK	V. P. Rajan	49,984	38.62	New
AIADMK	P. Prabakar	31,045	23.99	−39.46
JP	K. Dhanuskodi	26,706	20.63	New
MDMK	T. Sadhan Tirumalaikumar	17,862	13.80	New
BJP	M. Thangaraj	1,805	1.39	New
Margin of victory		18,939	14.63	−14.47
Turnout		129,427	70.52	7.80
Registered electors		192,670		
DMK gain from AIADMK		Swing	-24.83	

=== 1991 ===
1991 Tamil Nadu Legislative Assembly election: Rajapalayam
Party	Candidate	Votes	%	±%
AIADMK	T. Sathiah	68,657	63.45	+46.58
Thayaga Marumalarchi Kazhagam	K. Dhanuskodi	37,169	34.35	New
Independent	M. Poomari	687	0.63	New
Independent	M. Sonai	640	0.59	New
Margin of victory		31,488	29.10	25.77
Turnout		108,212	62.72	−13.88
Registered electors		177,434		
AIADMK gain from DMK		Swing	22.69	

=== 1989 ===
1989 Tamil Nadu Legislative Assembly election: Rajapalayam
Party	Candidate	Votes	%	±%
DMK	V. P. Rajan	49,137	40.75	New
INC	Arunachalam M	45,122	37.42	−17.07
AIADMK	K. Dhanuskodi	20,339	16.87	New
Independent	M. Shanmugaveli	4,873	4.04	New
Margin of victory		4,015	3.33	−6.38
Turnout		120,575	76.59	2.96
Registered electors		159,823		
DMK gain from INC		Swing	-13.74	

=== 1984 ===
1984 Tamil Nadu Legislative Assembly election: Rajapalayam
Party	Candidate	Votes	%	±%
INC	K. Raman	54,670	54.49	+20.29
CPI	I. Paulraj	44,924	44.78	New
Margin of victory		9,746	9.71	−0.15
Turnout		100,331	73.63	7.10
Registered electors		141,300		
INC gain from Independent		Swing	10.42	

=== 1980 ===
1980 Tamil Nadu Legislative Assembly election: Rajapalayam
Party	Candidate	Votes	%	±%
Independent	P. Mokkian	38,339	44.07	New
INC	K. Pottu Pottan	29,758	34.20	+1.81
Independent	A. Chinnaswamy	17,119	19.68	New
Independent	S. S. Maran	1,298	1.49	New
Independent	K. Paraman	489	0.56	New
Margin of victory		8,581	9.86	4.71
Turnout		87,003	66.53	6.71
Registered electors		131,952		
Independent gain from AIADMK		Swing	6.52	

=== 1977 ===
1977 Tamil Nadu Legislative Assembly election: Rajapalayam
Party	Candidate	Votes	%	±%
AIADMK	K. Dhanuskodi	28,028	37.55	New
INC	K. Pottupoattan	24,181	32.39	−17.15
JP	J. S. Baliah	11,702	15.68	New
DMK	K. Andi Alias Gurusamy	10,220	13.69	New
Independent	M. Sundaram	382	0.51	New
Margin of victory		3,847	5.15	4.24
Turnout		74,649	59.82	−17.21
Registered electors		126,020		
AIADMK gain from CPI		Swing	-12.91	

=== 1971 ===
1971 Tamil Nadu Legislative Assembly election: Rajapalayam
Party	Candidate	Votes	%	±%
CPI	K. Suppu	36,827	50.45	New
INC	K. R. Srirenga Raja	36,163	49.55	+14.41
Margin of victory		664	0.91	−17.24
Turnout		72,990	77.03	−6.81
Registered electors		98,432		
CPI gain from Independent		Swing	-2.83	

=== 1967 ===
1967 Madras Legislative Assembly election: Rajapalayam
Party	Candidate	Votes	%	±%
Independent	A. A. S. Raja	38,936	53.29	New
INC	P. A. A. Raja	25,675	35.14	−16.59
CPI(M)	T. Nadar	8,224	11.26	New
Margin of victory		13,261	18.15	−9.80
Turnout		73,066	83.83	3.99
Registered electors		89,597		
Independent gain from INC		Swing	1.56	

=== 1962 ===
1962 Madras Legislative Assembly election: Rajapalayam
Party	Candidate	Votes	%	±%
INC	R. Krishnasamy Naidu	41,692	51.73	New
SWA	V. Ramakrishna Raja	19,165	23.78	New
CPI	S. Alagirisamy	18,063	22.41	New
Independent	A. Chelliah	1,674	2.08	New
Margin of victory		22,527	27.95	
Turnout		80,594	79.84	
Registered electors		103,902		
INC win (new seat)				
