= A. A. S. Raja =

Indian politician

A. A. Subba Raja was an Indian politician and former Member of the Legislative Assembly of Tamil Nadu. He was elected to the Tamil Nadu legislative assembly as an Independent candidate from Rajapalayam constituency in 1967 election .

He was a four-time chairperson and two-time vice-chairperson of the municipality of Rajapalayam.
