= Valangiman Assembly constituency =

Legislative assembly constituency

Coordinates: 10.89°N 79.39°E

Valangiman
- Former constituency for the Tamil Nadu Legislative Assembly

Constituency details
- Country: India
- Region: South India
- State: Tamil Nadu
- District: Thanjavur
- Lok Sabha constituency: Thanjavur
- Established: 1967
- Abolished: 2008
- Total electors: 139,552

Valangaiman was a state assembly constituency in Thiruvarur district of Tamil Nadu. It was a Scheduled Caste reserved constituency. It was one of the 234 State Legislative Assembly Constituencies in Tamil Nadu, in India. Elections and winners in the constituency are listed below.

== Members of the Legislative Assembly ==
Year	Name	Party
1971	N. Somasundaram	Dravida Munnetra Kazhagam
1977	A. Chellappa	Dravida Munnetra Kazhagam
1980	Gomathi Srinivasan	All India Anna Dravida Munnetra Kazhagam
1984	Gomathi Srinivasan	All India Anna Dravida Munnetra Kazhagam
1989	Yasodha Chellappa	Dravida Munnetra Kazhagam
1991	K. Panchavarnam	All India Anna Dravida Munnetra Kazhagam
1996	Gomathi Srinivasan	Dravida Munnetra Kazhagam
2001	Boopathi Mariappan	All India Anna Dravida Munnetra Kazhagam
2006	Ilamathi Subramanian	All India Anna Dravida Munnetra Kazhagam

== Election results ==
Vote share of winning candidates
2006	47.23%
2001	57.93%
1996	50.78%
1991	64.59%
1989	40.98%
1984	55.78%
1980	56.11%
1977	36.01%
1971	58.11%
1967	53.10%

=== 2006 ===
2006 Tamil Nadu Legislative Assembly election: Valangiman
Party	Candidate	Votes	%	±%
AIADMK	Ilamathi Subramanian	51,939	47.23%	−10.70%
DMK	S. Senthamil Chelvan	50,306	45.75%	
DMDK	R. Sooriyamurthi	4,554	4.14%	
Independent	M. Anbalagan	1,265	1.15%	
BSP	A. Senthilkumar	665	0.60%	
BJP	M. Palaniappan @ Puratchikavidhasan	658	0.60%	
Independent	Arjunan Malai	573	0.52%	
Margin of victory		1,633	1.49%	−23.39%
Turnout		109,960	78.80%	12.39%
Registered electors		139,552		
AIADMK hold		Swing	-10.70%	

=== 2001 ===
2001 Tamil Nadu Legislative Assembly election: Valangiman
Party	Candidate	Votes	%	±%
AIADMK	Boopathi Mariappan	54,677	57.93%	28.84%
PT	T. Nadaiyazhagan	31,200	33.06%	
MDMK	M. Thiagarajan	3,298	3.49%	
Independent	Gomathi Srinivasan	1,813	1.92%	
Independent	G. Marimuthu	1,412	1.50%	
Independent	S. Prabakaran	1,060	1.12%	
Independent	S. Kasthuri	925	0.98%	
Margin of victory		23,477	24.87%	3.18%
Turnout		94,385	66.40%	−7.47%
Registered electors		142,156		
AIADMK gain from DMK		Swing	7.15%	

=== 1996 ===
1996 Tamil Nadu Legislative Assembly election: Valangiman
Party	Candidate	Votes	%	±%
DMK	Gomathi Srinivasan	48,019	50.78%	16.76%
AIADMK	V. Vivekanandan	27,508	29.09%	−35.50%
Independent	B. John Pandian	11,984	12.67%	
CPI(M)	M. Malathi	4,567	4.83%	
Independent	M. Vasu	950	1.00%	
Independent	R. Pandiyan	473	0.50%	
JP	P. Boobalasubramanian	433	0.46%	
PMK	P. Kaliyamurthy	337	0.36%	
Independent	M. Gowthaman	195	0.21%	
Independent	O. Mahalingam	89	0.09%	
Margin of victory		20,511	21.69%	−8.88%
Turnout		94,555	73.87%	1.70%
Registered electors		137,058		
DMK gain from AIADMK		Swing	-13.80%	

=== 1991 ===
1991 Tamil Nadu Legislative Assembly election: Valangiman
Party	Candidate	Votes	%	±%
AIADMK	K. Panchavarnam	58,504	64.59%	34.14%
DMK	S. Senthamil Chelvan	30,816	34.02%	−6.96%
AMI	T. Kaliamoorthy	646	0.71%	
PMK	P. Kalimurthy	613	0.68%	
Margin of victory		27,688	30.57%	20.04%
Turnout		90,579	72.17%	−27.83%
Registered electors		129,813		
AIADMK gain from DMK		Swing	23.61%	

=== 1989 ===
1989 Tamil Nadu Legislative Assembly election: Valangiman
Party	Candidate	Votes	%	±%
DMK	Yasotha Chellappa	38,522	40.98%	−0.12%
AIADMK	Vivekananda	28,624	30.45%	−25.33%
INC	V. R. Gopal	17,731	18.86%	
AIADMK	E. Thilagavathi	6,381	6.79%	−48.99%
Independent	N. Mahalingam	1,710	1.82%	
Independent	C. Thirumavalavan	530	0.56%	
LKD	Malarkodi Gunasekaran	257	0.27%	
Independent	K. Mahalingam	253	0.27%	
Margin of victory		9,898	10.53%	−4.15%
Turnout		94,008	100.00%	18.82%
Registered electors		96,050		
DMK gain from AIADMK		Swing	-14.80%	

=== 1984 ===
1984 Tamil Nadu Legislative Assembly election: Valangiman
Party	Candidate	Votes	%	±%
AIADMK	Gomathi Srinivasan	46,618	55.78%	−0.33%
DMK	N. Somasundaram Sithmalli	34,347	41.10%	0.39%
INC(J)	A. Nageswari	1,751	2.10%	
Independent	S. K. Swaminathan	861	1.03%	
Margin of victory		12,271	14.68%	−0.72%
Turnout		83,577	81.18%	8.39%
Registered electors		107,560		
AIADMK hold		Swing	-0.33%	

=== 1980 ===
1980 Tamil Nadu Legislative Assembly election: Valangiman
Party	Candidate	Votes	%	±%
AIADMK	Gomathi Srinivasan	40,667	56.11%	25.11%
DMK	A. Chellappa	29,502	40.70%	4.70%
Independent	A. Srinivasan	1,967	2.71%	
JP	S. K. Kannusamy	343	0.47%	
Margin of victory		11,165	15.40%	10.40%
Turnout		72,479	72.78%	2.03%
Registered electors		100,415		
AIADMK gain from DMK		Swing	20.10%	

=== 1977 ===
1977 Tamil Nadu Legislative Assembly election: Valangiman
Party	Candidate	Votes	%	±%
DMK	A. Chellappa	24,270	36.01%	−22.10%
AIADMK	P. Srinivasan	20,897	31.00%	
INC	A. Srinivasan	19,172	28.44%	−8.29%
JP	A. Pichaiyan	3,065	4.55%	
Margin of victory		3,373	5.00%	−16.37%
Turnout		67,404	70.76%	−8.12%
Registered electors		96,692		
DMK hold		Swing	-22.10%	

=== 1971 ===
1971 Tamil Nadu Legislative Assembly election: Valangiman
Party	Candidate	Votes	%	±%
DMK	N. Somasundaram	38,519	58.11%	5.01%
INC	V. Thangavelu	24,351	36.73%	−10.17%
Independent	K. Nedunchezian	2,683	4.05%	
Independent	A. Pichaiyan	525	0.79%	
Independent	Palanisamy	213	0.32%	
Margin of victory		14,168	21.37%	15.18%
Turnout		66,291	78.87%	−2.24%
Registered electors		87,481		
DMK hold		Swing	5.01%	

=== 1967 ===
1967 Madras Legislative Assembly election: Valangiman
Party	Candidate	Votes	%	±%
DMK	N. Somasundaram	34,436	53.10%	
INC	R. Subramaniam	30,418	46.90%	
Margin of victory		4,018	6.20%	
Turnout		64,854	81.12%	
Registered electors		82,620		
DMK win (new seat)				
