= K. Raman =

Indian politician

Personal details
- Party: Indian National Congress

K. Raman was an Indian politician and former Member of the Legislative Assembly of Tamil Nadu. He was elected to the Tamil Nadu legislative assembly as an Indian National Congress candidate from Rajapalayam constituency in 1984 election.
