= S. Thanga Pandian =

Indian politician

Member of the Tamil Nadu Legislative Assembly
- In office 16 May 2016 – 11 May 2026
- Preceded by: K. T. Rajenthra Bhalaji
- Succeeded by: K. Jegadeshwari
- Constituency: Rajapalayam

Personal details
- Party: Dravida Munnetra Kazhagam

S. Thanga Pandian is an Indian politician who is a Member of Legislative Assembly of Tamil Nadu. He was elected from Rajapalayam as a Dravida Munnetra Kazhagam candidate in 2016 & 2021.

== Elections contested ==
Election	Constituency	Party	Result	Vote %	Runner-up	Runner-up Party	Runner-up vote %
2021 Tamil Nadu Legislative Assembly election	Rajapalayam	DMK	Won	41.94%	K. T. Rajenthra Bhalaji	ADMK	39.73%
2016 Tamil Nadu Legislative Assembly election	Rajapalayam	DMK	Won	43.82%	A. A. S. Shyam	ADMK	41.00%
2011 Tamil Nadu Legislative Assembly election	Rajapalayam	DMK	Lost	39.41%	K. Gopalsamy	AIADMK	53.80%
