= A. Venkatachalam =

Indian politician

A.Venkatachalam

Member of Tamil Nadu Legislative Assembly
- In office 10 May 1996 – 11 May 2006
- Constituency: Alangudi
- In office 1984–1989
- Constituency: Alangudi

Personal details
- Born: 15 September 1955 Pullachi Kutiyiruppu, Vadakadu, Tamil Nadu, India
- Died: 7 October 2010 (aged 55) Vadakadu, Tamil Nadu
- Children: 3
- Occupation: Politician

A. Venkatachalam (15 September 1955 – 7 October 2010) was a MLA from Alangudi, Tamil Nadu; he represented the constituency for five year terms starting in 1984, 1996 and 2001. During this time, he was also the Minister for Tourism in Chief Minister J. Jayalalitha's cabinet. Venkatachalam was from the village of Vadakadu, which is located in what was his constituency.

Venkatachalam died on 7 October 2010, reportedly murdered by sickle in his house by four people. Angry mobs blocked roads and damaged vehicles in protest.
