= Gomathi Srinivasan =

Indian politician

Member of Legislative Assembly
- In office 1980–1989
- In office 1996–2001
- Constituency: Valangiman

Minister of Social Welfare
- In office 1980–1987

Personal details
- Party: Bharatiya Janata Party
- Other political affiliations: All India Anna Dravida Munnetra Kazhagam (1980-1995) and (2013-2024); Dravida Munnetra Kazhagam (1995-2001)
- Occupation: Politician

Gomathi Srinivasan is an Indian politician and was Minister of Social Welfare in the Government of Tamil Nadu between 1980 and 1987, as well as a Member of the Legislative Assembly (MLA) in the Tamil Nadu Legislative Assembly.

== Political career ==
G.Srinivasan is elected to be the Tamil Nadu State President from Metur Salem (AIADMK) candidate from Valangiman constituency in 1980. She served as Minister of Social Welfare in the cabinet of M. G. Ramachandran between 1980 and 1987, being re-elected from the same constituency, in the 1984 election. After Ramachandran had died, Gomathi Srinivasan switched allegiances and joined the Dravida Munnetra Kazhagam (DMK), for whom she won the Valangiman seat in the 1996 elections. The DMK denied her the opportunity to contest the 2001 elections and later suspended her for alleged anti-party activities. She returned to the AIADMK in September 2013. Gomathi Srinivasan was among several former DMK ministers legislators charged by Tamil Nadu Police in June 2005 of having assets disproportionate to their known income. All charges were dismissed by the courts in 2015 due to lack of evidence. In 2024, she joined the Bharatiya Janata Party in the presence of Tamil Nadu BJP chief K. Annamalai and Rajeev Chandrasekhar.

== Elections Contested ==
=== Tamilnadu State Legislative Assembly Elections ===
Elections	Constituency	Party	Result	Vote percentage	Opposition Candidate	Opposition Party	Opposition vote percentage
1980 Tamil Nadu Legislative Assembly election	Valangiman	AIADMK	Won	56.11	A. Chellappa	DMK	40.70
1984 Tamil Nadu Legislative Assembly election	Valangiman	AIADMK	Won	55.78	N. Somasundaram Sithmalli	DMK	41.10
1996 Tamil Nadu Legislative Assembly election	Valangiman	DMK	Won	50.78	V. Vivekanandan	AIADMK	29.09
2001 Tamil Nadu Legislative Assembly election	Valangiman	Independent	Lost	1.92	Boopathi Mariappan	AIADMK	57.93
