= P. Murugaiyan =

Indian politician

P. Murugaiyan was an Indian politician and former Member of the Legislative Assembly of Tamil Nadu. He was elected to the Tamil Nadu legislative assembly as a Dravida Munnetra Kazhagam candidate from Alangudi constituency in the 1962 election.
