= Ilamathi Subramanian =

Indian politician

Ilamathi Subramanian is an Indian politician and Member of the Legislative Assembly of Tamil Nadu. She was elected to the Tamil Nadu legislative assembly from Valangaiman constituency as a All India Anna Dravida Munnetra Kazhagam candidate in 2006 election.
