= Chinniah =

Indian politician

Chinniah was an Indian politician and former Member of the Legislative Assembly of Tamil Nadu. He was elected to the Tamil Nadu legislative assembly as an Indian National Congress (INC) candidate from Alangudi constituency in 1957 election. Arunachala Thevar from INC was the other winner from the same constituency.
