= S. Shanmuganathan (Indian politician) =

Indian politician

S. Shanmuganathan is an Indian politician and former Member of the Legislative Assembly of Tamil Nadu. He was elected to the Tamil Nadu Legislative Assembly as an Anna Dravida Munnetra Kazhagam candidate from Alangudi constituency in 1991 election.
