= Alangudi Assembly constituency =

One of the 234 State Legislative Assembly Constituencies in Tamil Nadu, in India

Coordinates: 10.26°N 78.81°E

Alangudi
- Constituency No. 182 for the Tamil Nadu Legislative Assembly

Constituency details
- Country: India
- Region: South India
- State: Tamil Nadu
- District: Pudukottai
- Lok Sabha constituency: Sivaganga
- Established: 1957
- Total electors: 2,12,139
- Reservation: None

Member of Legislative Assembly
- 17th Tamil Nadu Legislative Assembly
- Incumbent Siva.V.Meyyanathan
- Party: DMK
- Elected year: 2026

Alangudi is a state legislative assembly constituency in Pudukkottai district in the Indian state of Tamil Nadu. It includes the city of Alangudi and is a part of Sivaganga Lok Sabha constituency. The constituency has been in existence since the 1957 election. It is one of the 234 State Legislative Assembly Constituencies in Tamil Nadu, in India.

== Members of the Legislative Assembly ==
Year	Member	Political party
1957	Arunachala Thevar	Indian National Congress
1957	Chinniah	Indian National Congress
1962	P. Murugaiyan	Dravida Munnetra Kazhagam
1967	K. V. Subbiah	Dravida Munnetra Kazhagam
1971	K. V. Subbiah	Dravida Munnetra Kazhagam
1977	T. Pushparaju	Indian National Congress
1980	P. Thirumaran	All India Anna Dravida Munnetra Kazhagam
1984	A. Venkatachalam	All India Anna Dravida Munnetra Kazhagam
1989	K. B. V. Sc. Chandrasekaran	Dravida Munnetra Kazhagam
1991	S. Shanmuganathan	All India Anna Dravida Munnetra Kazhagam
1996	A. Venkatachalam	Independent politician
2001	A. Venkatachalam	All India Anna Dravida Munnetra Kazhagam
2006	S. Rajasekaran	Communist Party of India
2011	Ku. Pa. Krishnan	All India Anna Dravida Munnetra Kazhagam
2016	Meyyanathan Siva V	Dravida Munnetra Kazhagam
2021	Meyyanathan Siva V	Dravida Munnetra Kazhagam
2026	Meyyanathan Siva V	Dravida Munnetra Kazhagam

Madras State

== Election results ==
Vote share of winning candidates
2021	35.98%
2021	51.17%
2016	46.17%
2011	41.42%
2006	39.30%
2001	42.67%
1996	25.58%
1991	68.83%
1989	29.18%
1984	65.86%
1980	55.33%
1977	38.94%
1971	54.22%
1967	50.64%
1962	60.99%
1957	20.27%

=== Assembly election 2026 ===
2026 Tamil Nadu Legislative Assembly election : Alangudi
Party	Candidate	Votes	%	±%
DMK	Meyyanathan Siva V	64,929	35.98%	▼15.40
TVK	Kandasamy	51,952	28.78%	New
AIADMK	Dhana Vimal	50,063	27.74%	New
NTK	R. Rajaram	10,652	5.90%	▼3.14
NOTA	None of the above	673	0.37%	▼0.04
Margin of victory		12,977	7.19%	▼7.91
Turnout		180,598	85.13%	▲6.05
Total valid votes		180,483		
Registered electors		212,139		▼2.39
DMK hold		Swing		

=== Assembly election 2021 ===
2021 Tamil Nadu Legislative Assembly election : Alangudi
Party	Candidate	Votes	%	±%
DMK	Meyyanathan Siva V	87,935	51.38%	▲5.21
AIADMK	Dharma Thangavel	62,088	36.28%	▼3.60
NTK	C. Thiruchelvam	15,477	9.04%	▲8.09
AMMK	D. Vidangar	2,924	1.71%	New
MNM	N. Vairavan	1,230	0.72%	New
NOTA	None of the above	702	0.41%	▼0.27
Margin of victory		25,847	15.10%	▲8.81
Turnout		171,868	79.08%	▼0.37
Total valid votes		171,140		
Rejected ballots		26	0.02%	▲0.02
Registered electors		217,344		▲9.22
DMK hold		Swing		

=== Assembly election 2016 ===
2016 Tamil Nadu Legislative Assembly election : Alangudi
Party	Candidate	Votes	%	±%
DMK	Meyyanathan Siva V	72,992	46.17%	New
AIADMK	Gnana Kalaiselvan	63,051	39.88%	▼1.54
MDMK	Dr. K. Chandrasekaran	11,387	7.20%	New
PMK	S. Arulmani	5,514	3.49%	▼34.22
NTK	Kala Durai	1,495	0.95%	New
NOTA	None of the above	1,068	0.68%	New
Margin of victory		9,941	6.29%	▲2.58
Turnout		158,100	79.45%	▼2.57
Total valid votes		158,096		
Rejected ballots		4	0.00%	▼0.12
Registered electors		198,988		▲17.96
DMK gain from AIADMK		Swing	▲4.75	

=== Assembly election 2011 ===
2011 Tamil Nadu Legislative Assembly election : Alangudi
Party	Candidate	Votes	%	±%
AIADMK	Ku. Pa. Krishnan	57,250	41.42%	▲8.10
PMK	S. Arulmani	52,123	37.71%	New
Independent	A. V. Rajapandiyan	21,717	15.71%	
IJK	A. Saravanan	3,666	2.65%	New
BJP	S. Jeganathan	2,033	1.47%	▼3.52
Independent	P. Nagamoorthy	1,414	1.02%	
Margin of victory		5,127	3.71%	▼2.27
Turnout		138,365	82.02%	▲4.65
Total valid votes		138,203		
Rejected ballots		162	0.12%	▲0.12
Registered electors		168,687		▼14.69
AIADMK gain from CPI		Swing	▲2.12	

=== Assembly election 2006 ===
2006 Tamil Nadu Legislative Assembly election : Alangudi
Party	Candidate	Votes	%	±%
CPI	S. Rajasekaran	60,122	39.30%	New
AIADMK	A. Venkatachalam	50,971	33.32%	New
DMDK	K. Selvinraj	16,739	10.94%	New
Independent	Rajaparamasivam	14,939	9.76%	
BJP	R. Jeevanandham	7,634	4.99%	New
BSP	K. Karuppaiah	1,400	0.92%	New
Independent	Durai. Sivakumar	1,181	0.77%	
Margin of victory		9,151	5.98%	▼5.99
Turnout		152,998	77.37%	▲8.77
Total valid votes		152,986		
Registered electors		197,741		▼3.00
CPI gain from AIADMK		Swing	▼3.37	

=== Assembly election 2001 ===
2001 Tamil Nadu Legislative Assembly election : Alangudi
Party	Candidate	Votes	%	±%
AIADMK	A. Venkatachalam	59,631	42.67%	▲23.40
DMK	S. A. Soosairaj	42,900	30.70%	New
Independent	T. Pushparaj	18,052	12.92%	
MDMK	Dr. K. Chandrasekaran	11,578	8.29%	▼3.22
Independent	M. Yoganantham	5,332	3.82%	
Independent	K. Ramaiahthondaiman	2,242	1.60%	
Margin of victory		16,731	11.97%	▲11.50
Turnout		139,840	68.60%	▼7.09
Total valid votes		139,735		
Rejected ballots		105	0.08%	▼6.25
Registered electors		203,850		▲4.69
AIADMK gain from Independent		Swing	▲17.09	

=== Assembly election 1996 ===
1996 Tamil Nadu Legislative Assembly election : Alangudi
Party	Candidate	Votes	%	±%
Independent	A. Venkatachalam	35,345	25.58%	
CPI	S. Erasasekaran	34,693	25.11%	New
AIADMK	V. P. Raman	26,623	19.27%	New
MDMK	Dr. K. Chandrasekaran	15,904	11.51%	New
AIIC(T)	V. C. Ganesan	15,625	11.31%	New
Independent	N. Gurumoorthi	5,712	4.13%	
Independent	S. Vetriselvan	999	0.72%	
BJP	K. Rajappu Trirumatri	865	0.63%	New
Margin of victory		652	0.47%	▼38.11
Turnout		147,393	75.69%	▲1.28
Total valid votes		138,176		
Rejected ballots		9,328	6.33%	▲3.60
Registered electors		194,721		▲9.40
Independent gain from AIADMK		Swing	▼43.25	

=== Assembly election 1991 ===
1991 Tamil Nadu Legislative Assembly election : Alangudi
Party	Candidate	Votes	%	±%
AIADMK	S. Shanmuganathan	88,684	68.83%	New
DMK	S. Chirtrarasu	38,983	30.26%	▲1.08
Margin of victory		49,701	38.58%	▲35.28
Turnout		132,452	74.41%	▼7.45
Total valid votes		128,837		
Rejected ballots		3,615	2.73%	▲1.22
Registered electors		177,995		▲12.08
AIADMK gain from DMK		Swing	▲39.65	

=== Assembly election 1989 ===
1989 Tamil Nadu Legislative Assembly election : Alangudi
Party	Candidate	Votes	%	±%
DMK	K. B. V. Sc. Chandrasekaran	37,361	29.18%	▼3.81
INC	T. Purhparaju	33,141	25.88%	New
Independent	Vijaya Regunatha Pallavaraya Durai	29,649	23.15%	
AIADMK	T. Valaramathy	26,192	20.45%	New
Margin of victory		4,220	3.30%	▼29.57
Turnout		130,009	81.86%	▼2.24
Total valid votes		128,050		
Rejected ballots		1,959	1.51%	▼2.21
Registered electors		158,817		▲14.14
DMK gain from AIADMK		Swing	▼36.68	

=== Assembly election 1984 ===
1984 Tamil Nadu Legislative Assembly election : Alangudi
Party	Candidate	Votes	%	±%
AIADMK	A. Venkatachalam	74,202	65.86%	▲10.53
DMK	A. Periyannan	37,173	32.99%	New
Independent	M. Mathinirai Selvan	994	0.88%	
Margin of victory		37,029	32.87%	▲19.23
Turnout		117,018	84.10%	▲2.61
Total valid votes		112,667		
Rejected ballots		4,351	3.72%	▲2.76
Registered electors		139,144		▲4.94
AIADMK hold		Swing		

=== Assembly election 1980 ===
1980 Tamil Nadu Legislative Assembly election : Alangudi
Party	Candidate	Votes	%	±%
AIADMK	P. Thirumaran	59,206	55.33%	New
INC	T. Pushparaju	44,605	41.68%	▲2.74
Independent	A. Bala Krishnan	2,296	2.15%	
Margin of victory		14,601	13.64%	▲2.70
Turnout		108,046	81.49%	▲2.67
Total valid votes		107,011		
Rejected ballots		1,035	0.96%	▼0.02
Registered electors		132,592		▲7.06
AIADMK gain from INC		Swing	▲16.39	

=== Assembly election 1977 ===
1977 Tamil Nadu Legislative Assembly election : Alangudi
Party	Candidate	Votes	%	±%
INC	T. Pushparaju	37,634	38.94%	New
AIADMK	P. Thirumaran	27,059	28.00%	New
DMK	A. Periyannan	20,244	20.95%	▼33.27
JP	M. Ramachandran	10,788	11.16%	New
Independent	A. Sathyanathan	927	0.96%	
Margin of victory		10,575	10.94%	▲1.07
Turnout		97,613	78.82%	▼8.10
Total valid votes		96,652		
Rejected ballots		961	0.98%	▲0.98
Registered electors		123,846		▲30.25
INC gain from DMK		Swing	▼15.28	

=== Assembly election 1971 ===
1971 Tamil Nadu Legislative Assembly election : Alangudi
Party	Candidate	Votes	%	±%
DMK	K. V. Subbiah	43,279	54.22%	▲3.58
INC	T. A. S. Thangavelu	35,397	44.34%	New
Independent	S. Soorianarayanan	1,150	1.44%	
Margin of victory		7,882	9.87%	▲8.59
Turnout		82,644	86.92%	▲2.33
Total valid votes		79,826		
Registered electors		95,080		▲18.61
DMK hold		Swing		

=== Assembly election 1967 ===
1967 Madras State Legislative Assembly election : Alangudi
Party	Candidate	Votes	%	±%
DMK	K. V. Subbiah	32,984	50.64%	▼10.35
INC	T. A. S. Thangavelu	32,148	49.36%	▲13.52
Margin of victory		836	1.28%	▼23.87
Turnout		67,806	84.59%	▲18.40
Total valid votes		65,132		
Registered electors		80,163		▼2.22
DMK hold		Swing		

=== Assembly election 1962 ===
1962 Madras State Legislative Assembly election : Alangudi
Party	Candidate	Votes	%	±%
DMK	P. Murugaiyan	31,438	60.99%	New
INC	V. R. Mangappan	18,472	35.84%	▼0.30
Independent	K. U. Velan	1,636	3.17%	
Margin of victory		12,966	25.15%	▲18.13
Turnout		54,265	66.19%	▼24.86
Total valid votes		51,546		
Registered electors		81,983		▼47.10
DMK gain from INC		Swing	▲40.72	

=== Assembly election 1957 ===
1957 Madras State Legislative Assembly election : Alangudi
Party	Candidate	Votes	%	±%
INC	Arunachala Thevar	28,599	20.27%	New
INC	Chinniah	22,405	15.88%	New
Independent	Subbiah	18,692	13.25%	New
Independent	Balakrishan	18,337	12.99%	New
PSP	Karuppiah	14,538	10.30%	New
Independent	A. Arumugam	10,983	7.78%	New
Independent	Sengol Udayar	9,482	6.72%	New
CPI	M. Thangavelu	9,209	6.53%	New
Independent	Sheik Dawwod	3,037	2.15%	New
Independent	Periathambi	2,299	1.63%	New
Independent	Miras Theethappan Kandiyar	1,774	1.26%	New
Independent	S. R. Muthuvelu	1,765	1.25%	New
Margin of victory		9,907	7.02%	
Turnout		141,120	91.05%	
Total valid votes		141,120		
Registered electors		154,984		
INC win (new seat)				
