= Avanam =

Coordinates: 10°20′N 79°08′E

Avanam is a village in Peravurani taluk, Thanjavur district, Tamil Nadu, India. In 2011, it had a population of 3,051 with 1,421 males and 1,630 females.

There is a temple dedicated to goddess Muthumariamman in the village.
