= T. Pushparaju =

Indian politician

T. Pushparaju is an Indian politician and former Member of the Legislative Assembly of Tamil Nadu. He was elected to the Tamil Nadu legislative assembly as an Indian National Congress candidate from Alangudi constituency in 1977 election and from Thirumayam constituency in 1984 election. District President in Pudukkottai Congress Committee in 15 year continue.
