= R. Krishnan (Pattali Makkal Katchi politician) =

Indian politician

Member of the Legislative Assembly, Tamil Nadu Legislative Assembly
- In office 2001–2006
- Preceded by: P. Selvarasu
- Succeeded by: S. Gurusamy
- Constituency: Anthiyur

Personal details
- Born: 23 October 1953 Chithakkavundanpalayam
- Party: Pattali Makkal Katchi
- Profession: Weaving

R. Krishnan is an Indian politician and a former Member of the Legislative Assembly (MLA) of Tamil Nadu. He hails from the village of Chithakkavundanpalayam in the Erode district. Having completed his education up to the eighth standard, Krishnan is a member of the Pattali Makkal Katchi (PMK) party. He contested the 2001 Tamil Nadu Legislative Assembly elections from the Anthiyur Assembly constituency and emerged victorious to become a Member of the Legislative Assembly.

== Electoral Performance ==
=== 2001 ===
2001 Tamil Nadu Legislative Assembly election: Anthiyur
Party	Candidate	Votes	%	±%
PMK	R. Krishanan	53,436	54.38%	
DMK	Selvarasu. P	35,374	36.00%	−16.97%
MDMK	Thangavel . M. D	3,808	3.88%	−0.03%
Independent	Raja . M	2,167	2.21%	
Independent	Sellammal	1,556	1.58%	
Independent	Ponnusamy. G	1,083	1.10%	
MNK(PLP)	Gurusamy. V	466	0.47%	
Independent	Shanmugam . G	379	0.39%	
Margin of victory		18,062	18.38%	−6.82%
Turnout		98,269	56.66%	−9.99%
Registered electors		1,73,432		
PMK gain from DMK		Swing	1.41%	
