= By-elections to the 12th Tamil Nadu Assembly =

2001–2006 Indian States elections

2001–2006 Tamil Nadu assembly by-elections
- 21 February – 31 May 2002; 26 February 2003 (needed to include February 26, 2003, May 10, 2004, May 14, 2005)

5 vacant seats in the Legislature of Tamil Nadu
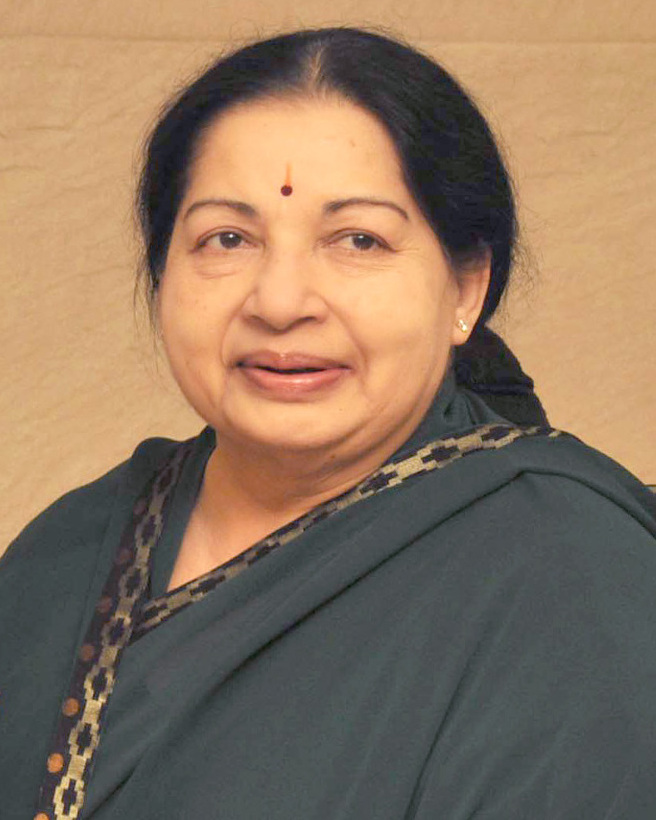

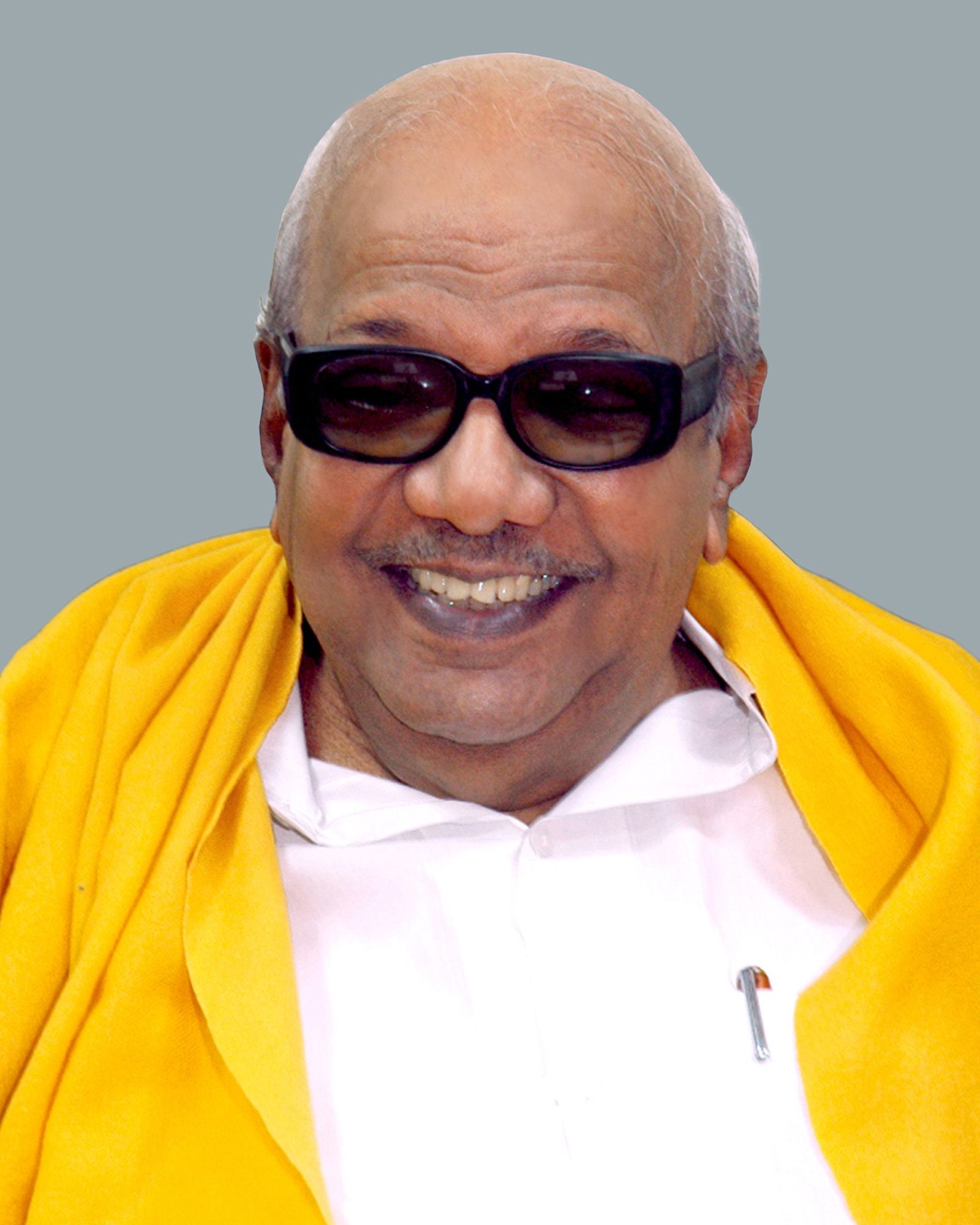
	First party	Second party
Leader	J. Jayalalithaa	M. Karunanidhi
Party	AIADMK	DMK
Alliance	N/A	NDA (2001-03); UPA (2004-06)
Leader's seat	Andipatti	Chepauk
Seats won	5	0
Seat change	▲4	▼3
Popular vote	219,906	212,100
Percentage	53.5%	35.5%
Chief Minister before election
O. Panneerselvam
AIADMK
Chief Minister
J. Jayalalithaa
AIADMK

By-elections to Andipatti constituency was held in Tamil Nadu, India, on 21 February 2002. Three state assembly constituencies, Saidapet, Vaniyambadi, and Acharapakkam were held on 31 May 2002. In 2003, by-election in Sathankulam was held on 26 February 2003. During this by-election, the DMK and all the other major parties supported the Congress candidate, while only BJP supported the AIADMK candidate. This election came after the support of the Anti-conversion bill by AIADMK general secretary, Jayalalithaa and increasing tension between DMK and BJP due to the passage of the bill. The AIADMK win in Sathankulam was significant, since it completes the AIADMK sweep in by-elections after its victory in 2001. Also the anti-conversion bill was not an important factor in the congress-bastion Sathankulam, whose electorate consists of a large percentage of minorities.

Despite attempts by the opposition to delay the Andipatti by-election, due to alleged voter list irregularities, the Election Commission of India decided to have the vacant seat in Andipatti, early in February and push off the other three vacant seats, in May. Andipatti seat was made vacant by the resignation of Thanga Tamil Selvan to facilitate the election of J. Jayalalithaa, who had her corruption charges cleared in late December in 2001. Despite the fact that she could not participate in the 2001 General Elections due to her 4 nominations being disqualified, she was sworn-into office. After being released from the case, she contested this election and became Chief minister in March 2002.

As AIADMK had won 132 seats in 2001 State assembly election, even with the breakup of its previous alliance with Tamil Maanila Congress (TMC), Indian National Congress (INC), Communist Party of India (CPI), Communist Party of India (Marxist) (CPIM) and Pattali Makkal Katchi (PMK), it would have still continued to stay in power, regardless of the results in the by-election. But since Jayalalithaa was legally not allowed to run for an MLA seat in 2001, she made the decision to run for an MLA seat before swearing in as Chief Minister.

The Andipatti victory, in late February, paved way for Jayalalithaa to swear in as Chief Minister. The party also swept the by-election in late May. The PMK lost an anticipated victory in Acharappakam, a constituency with a high percentage of Vanniyars electorates. It was observed that the Dalit vote base coupled with the popularity of Jayalalithaa led to the defeat, allowing AIADMK to wrest this seat from the PMK.

== Alliances ==
Due to reported frustrations with J. Jayalalithaa, almost all of her allies from 2001 election, left the AIADMK alliance and started their own third front. The Third Front consisted of CPM, CPI, Indian National League (INL), TMC and INC. AIADMK, which was supported by 196 MLAs in 2001, shrunk to 132 seats, with 64 MLAs leaving the alliance. Only 117 seats are required for a party to form a Government. The PMK, who backed AIADMK in 2001, backed the Dravida Munnetra Kazhagam (DMK), in this by-election, which was part of the National Democratic Alliance (NDA).

== Results ==
After Sathankulam by-election in 2003:

AIADMK+	SEATS	DMK+	SEATS	Third Front	SEATS	OTHERS	SEATS
AIADMK	136 (+4)	DMK	30 (-1)	CPM	6	MDMK	0
		PMK	19 (-1)	CPI	5	FBL	1
		BJP	4	TMC	22		
		MADMK	2	INC	7		
				INL	0 (-1)		
TOTAL (2003)	136	TOTAL (2003)	55	TOTAL (2003)	42	TOTAL (2003)	1
TOTAL (2001)	196	TOTAL (2001)	37	TOTAL (2001)	n/a	TOTAL (2001)	1

- The number on the left, in the table, represents the total number of MLAs after the by-election, and the number in parentheses represents, the seats picked up or lost due to the by-election
- The numbers presented for 2001, represents, the alliance, when the PMK and Third Front allied with the AIADMK.

== Constituents and results ==
Source: Election Commission of India

=== Andipatti ===
2002–03 Tamil Nadu Legislative Assembly by-elections: Andipatti
Party	Candidate	Votes	%	±%
AIADMK	J. Jayalalithaa	78,437	58.22%	+4.44%
DMK	Vaigai Sekar	37,236	27.64%	−4.03%
MDMK	Jayachandran	8,421	6.25%	−5.94%
Majority		41,201	n/a	n/a
Turnout		134,734	n/a	n/a
AIADMK hold		Swing		

=== Saidapet ===
The election here became very controversial, when opposition leaders, DMK, the left and others, complained about ADMK party cadres allegedly working with the police, that resulted in taking over of polling booths. There were also complaints of voter registration fraud by the opposition. The opposition leaders appealed for an entirely new election in this constituent, which was rejected, by the ECI.

2002–03 Tamil Nadu Legislative Assembly by-elections: Saidapet
Party	Candidate	Votes	%	±%
AIADMK	Radha Ravi	65,868	50.9%	
DMK	Ma. Subramanian	53,943	41.7%	
CPI(M)	T. Nandagopal	4,154	3.2%	
MDMK	P. Subramani	2,235	1.7%	
Majority		11,925		
Turnout		129,433	52.2%	
AIADMK gain from DMK		Swing		

=== Vaniyambadi ===
Source: The Hindu

2002–03 Tamil Nadu Legislative Assembly by-elections: Vaniyambadi
Party	Candidate	Votes	%	±%
AIADMK	R. Vadivelu	63,599	49.2%	
DMK	E.M. Anifa	43,878	34.0%	
INL	Nawaz	11,324	8.8%	
MDMK	R. Lakshmi Kanthan	3,191	2.5%	
PNK	S. Shakila	1,135	0.9%	
LJSP	Abdullah Basha	1,045	0.8%	
Majority		19,721		
Turnout		129,217	63.7%	
AIADMK gain from INL		Swing		

- Indian National League is not a recognized party by ECI, so Nawaz was listed as an independent, rather than under the INL banner in the election ballots.

=== Acharapakkam (SC) ===
Source: The Hindu
The MDMK, did not contest this seat, instead supported the PMK candidate, which also got the support of DMK and BJP.

2002 Tamil Nadu Legislative Assembly by-election : Acharapakkam
Party	Candidate	Votes	%	±%
AIADMK	A. Boovaraghamoorthy	55,507	53.42%	New
PMK	D. Parventhan	37,590	36.18%	▼17.51
CPI	P. S. Ellappan	4,047	3.89%	New
APMK	S. J. Raja	1,928	1.86%	New
Independent	D. Vinoth Khannan	1,558	1.50%	
Independent	S. Ramesh	852	0.82%	
Independent	A. Murugesan	825	0.79%	
Margin of victory		17,917	17.24%	▲1.88
Turnout		103,911	62.13%	▲1.97
Total valid votes		103,911		
Registered electors		167,240		▼0.18
AIADMK gain from PMK		Swing	▼0.27	

=== Sathankulam ===
Source: ECI
Election was necessitated due to death of S.S. Mani Nadar.

2002–03 Tamil Nadu Legislative Assembly by-elections: Sathankulam
Party	Candidate	Votes	%	±%
AIADMK	L. Neelamegavarnam	56,945	57.0%	
INC	A. Mahendran	39,453	39.0%	
Majority		17,492	18.0%	n/a
Turnout		100,446	64.8%	n/a
AIADMK gain from TMC(M)		Swing		

== See also ==
1. ECI Press Release
