= 1962 Madras State Legislative Assembly election =

Election in India

1962 Madras Legislative Assembly election
- 17–24 February 1962

All 206 seats in the Legislature of Madras State 104 seats needed for a majority
- Turnout: 70.65% (▲24.09%)
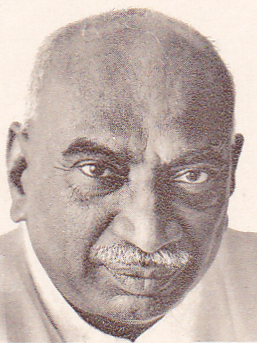

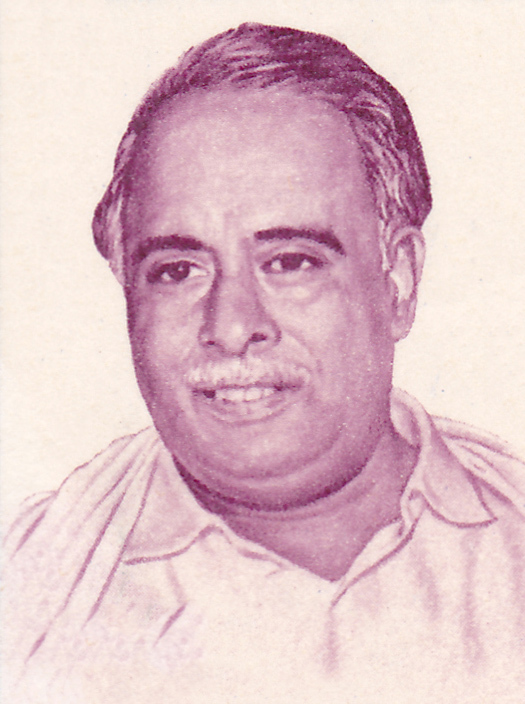
	First party	Second party
Leader	K. Kamaraj	C. N. Annadurai
Party	INC	DMK
Leader's seat	Sattur	Kancheepuram (lost)
Seats won	139	50
Seat change	▼14	New Party
Popular vote	5,848,974	3,435,633
Percentage	46.14%	27.10%
Swing	▲0.80%	New
Chief Minister before election
K. Kamaraj
INC
Elected Chief Minister
K. Kamaraj
INC

The third legislative assembly election to the Madras state (presently Tamil Nadu) was held between 17 and 24 February 1962. The Indian National Congress party, led by K. Kamaraj, won the election. Dravida Munnetra Kazhagam made significant in-roads in the election and emerged as the second party for the first time by winning 50 seats. 1962 Election remains the most recent election in which Indian National Congress formed a majority Government in the State as its support has heavily declined due to rise of Dravidian political parties.

The election also marked the last time a non-Dravidian party emerged as the largest party in the legislature, a record not broke until 59 years later by Vijay's Tamilaga Vettri Kazhagam.

While the Dravida Munnetra Kazhagam emerged as the opposition, its leader C. N. Annadurai, lost in his Kanceehpuram constituency, thus becoming the first and only DMK leader to lose his seat until 2026, when the incumbent DMK Chief Minister Stalin lost re-election in his bastion of Kolathur.

== Constituencies ==
Two member constituencies were abolished in 1961 by the Two-Member Constituencies(Abolition) Act, 1961. 38 two member constituencies were abolished and an equal number of single member constituencies were established and reserved for Scheduled Caste and Scheduled Tribe candidates. The total number of constituencies remained at 206.

== Background ==
Dravida Munnetra Kazhagam was emerging as a major challenger to Indian National Congress party in Tamil Nadu. However, its popularity was limited to the urban areas surrounding Madras and North and South Arcot districts. It had lacked a major support base in rural central and southern Tamil Nadu, a strong base of the Congress party. It won three city elections of the five largest cities, Madras, Madurai, Tiruchirappalli, Salem and Coimbatore in Madras state in alliance with the Communist Party of India in 1959 capitalising on its powerful urban base.

While trying to clarify DMK's position on "Northern domination", Annadurai said his party only meant that the existing Central Government was holding extraordinary powers over the States and his party only seeks to change this by "amendment of the Constitution through Constitutional methods". Infuriated by the softening of DMK's position, E. V. K. Sampath condemned what he called Annadurai's "dictatorship".

== Parties and issues ==
Indian National Congress contested the election alone. Periyar E. V. Ramasamy supported Congress headed by K. Kamaraj. He said

I am old and may not live much longer. After I am gone, Kamaraj will safeguard the interests of the Tamils. He is my heir. Ultimately, Kamaraj is the one who matters—not others, candidates, or even voters who are unfit to judge what is right and good for them! Trust me, vote Congress, and you will be well. If you don't, the cunning Rajaji, riding the DMK horse, will trample you all without mercy.

As the 1962 election approached, the two wings of Dravida Munnetra Kazhagam further polarised over the issue of electoral alliance. E. V. K. Sampath favoured alliance with Communist Party of India and Annadurai favoured alliance with the newly formed C. Rajagopalachari's Swatantra Party. Rajaji, the Chief Minister of Madras State between 1952 and 1954 had been a declared enemy of DMK and now he sought alliance with DMK. He said that the

Congress party is more communal than parties which are openly communal.

In 1961, Sampath left DMK to form his own party Tamil Nationalist Party with an objective and goal to establish an "autonomous Tamil State". Annadurai's idea to include Swatantra Party in the electoral alliance was not totally welcome in the DMK party and despite Rajaji's opposition DMK aligned with the Communist Party of India. It also formed coalition with Muthuramalinga Thevar's Forward Bloc and Mohammad Ismail's Muslim League.

DMK leader C. N. Annadurai accused the then ruling Congress party of bribing voters during his Kancheepuram Assembly constituency campaign. He appealed to voters not to sell their votes for the newly introduced ₹5 currency note, alleging that police support was used to facilitate such practices. It was also reported that voters were asked to place the currency note over the image of Tirupati Lord Perumal and pledge to vote for the Congress party.

== Support from Tamil film industry ==
M. G. Ramachandran actively campaigned for Dravida Munnetra Kazhagam. S. S. Rajendran, one of the popular actors contested and won from Theni Constituency. Shivaji Ganesan extended his support & actively campaigned to Congress Party. Congress party made a movie Vakkurimai by popular film actors which was played all across Tamil Nadu.

== Voting and results ==
Source: Election Commission of India

=== Results ===
Alliances	Party	Popular Vote	Vote %	Seats contested	Seats won	Change
INC; Seats: 139; Seat Change: -12; Popular Vote: 5,848,974; Popular Vote %: 46.14%	Indian National Congress	5,848,974	46.14%	206	139	▼12
Others; Seats: 67; Seat Change: +25; Popular Vote: 6,827,372; Popular Vote %: 53.86%	Dravida Munnetra Kazhagam	3,435,633	27.10%	143	50	▲37
Others; Seats: 67; Seat Change: +25; Popular Vote: 6,827,372; Popular Vote %: 53.86%	Swatantra Party	991,773	7.82%	94	6	▲6
Others; Seats: 67; Seat Change: +25; Popular Vote: 6,827,372; Popular Vote %: 53.86%	All India Forward Bloc	173,261	1.37%	6	3	▲3
Others; Seats: 67; Seat Change: +25; Popular Vote: 6,827,372; Popular Vote %: 53.86%	Communist Party of India	978,806	7.72%	68	2	▼2
Others; Seats: 67; Seat Change: +25; Popular Vote: 6,827,372; Popular Vote %: 53.86%	Socialist Party of India	48,753	0.38%	7	1	–
Others; Seats: 67; Seat Change: +25; Popular Vote: 6,827,372; Popular Vote %: 53.86%	Praja Socialist Party	159,212	1.26%	21	0	▼2
Others; Seats: 67; Seat Change: +25; Popular Vote: 6,827,372; Popular Vote %: 53.86%	Naam Tamilar Katchi	117,640	0.93%	16	0	–
Others; Seats: 67; Seat Change: +25; Popular Vote: 6,827,372; Popular Vote %: 53.86%	Indian Union Muslim League	89,968	0.71%	6	0	–
Others; Seats: 67; Seat Change: +25; Popular Vote: 6,827,372; Popular Vote %: 53.86%	Republican Party of India	57,457	0.45%	4	0	–
Others; Seats: 67; Seat Change: +25; Popular Vote: 6,827,372; Popular Vote %: 53.86%	Tamil National Party	44,048	0.35%	9	0	–
Others; Seats: 67; Seat Change: +25; Popular Vote: 6,827,372; Popular Vote %: 53.86%	Tamilnad Socialist Labour Party	43,186	0.34%	7	0	–
Others; Seats: 67; Seat Change: +25; Popular Vote: 6,827,372; Popular Vote %: 53.86%	Jan Sangh	10,743	0.08%	4	0	–
Others; Seats: 67; Seat Change: +25; Popular Vote: 6,827,372; Popular Vote %: 53.86%	Independent	676,892	5.34%	207	5	▼17
Total	13 Political Parties	12,676,346	100%	—	206	—

=== District wise results ===
District	Seats			
District	Seats	INC	DMK	OTH
Chengalpattu	19	12	5	2
Madras	11	6	5	0
North Arcot	15	7	8	0
South Arcot	17	9	7	1
Salem	23	13	8	2
Coimbatore	22	21	0	1
Nilgiris	2	2	0	0
Tiruchirapalli	20	10	9	1
Thanjavur	20	15	4	1
Madurai	20	15	3	2
Ramanathapuram	14	8	1	5
Tirunelveli	17	17	0	0
Kanyakumari	6	4	0	2
Total	206	139	50	17

=== By Region ===
Major Party-wise Results
Region	Total Seats	Indian National Congress	Dravida Munnetra Kazhagam	Others
Northern Madras	62	34 / 62 (55%)	25 / 62 (40%)	3 / 62 (5%)
Western Madras	47	36 / 47 (77%)	8 / 47 (17%)	3 / 47 (6%)
Southern Madras	57	44 / 57 (77%)	4 / 57 (7%)	9 / 57 (16%)
Central Madras	40	25 / 40 (63%)	13 / 40 (33%)	2 / 40 (5%)

=== By constituency ===
Winner, runner-up, voter turnout, and victory margin in every constituency
District	Assembly Constituency		Winner				Runner Up				Margin
District	#k	Name	Candidate	Party	Votes	%	Candidate	Party	Votes	%	Margin
Madras	1	Washermanpet	M. Mayandi Nadar	INC	25,732	37.77	M. Vedachalam	DMK	24,095	35.37	1,637
Madras	2	Harbour	K. S. G. Haja Shareef	INC	26,330	49.87	C. P. Chinnaraj	DMK	23,098	43.74	3,232
Madras	3	Basin Bridge	T. N. Anandanayaki	INC	31,477	50.63	N. V. Natarajan	DMK	25,913	41.68	5,564
Madras	4	Perambur	D. Sulochana	INC	40,451	54.48	Satyavani Muthu	DMK	32,309	43.51	8,142
Madras	5	Purasawalkam	Bashyam Reddy	INC	27,474	42.04	S. Pakkirisamy Pillai	Tamilnad Socialist Labour Party	18,713	28.64	8,761
Madras	6	Thousand lights	K. A. Mathialagan	DMK	27,984	45.59	Indrani Chengalvarayan	INC	25,609	41.72	2,375
Madras	7	Egmore	Jothi Venkatachalam	INC	29,283	48.25	Anbazhagan	DMK	27,666	45.58	1,617
Madras	8	Triplicane	V. R. Nedunchezhiyan	DMK	33,273	51.29	Sivanesan	INC	22,903	35.31	10,370
Madras	9	Mylapore	Arangannal	DMK	25,825	40.24	A. Varadappa Chettiar	INC	18,472	28.78	7,353
Madras	10	T. Nagar	Kanchi Manimozhiar	DMK	35,402	41.02	Guntur Narasimha Rao	INC	26,834	31.09	8,568
Chengalpattu	11	Gummidipundi	A. Ragahava Reddy	SWA	19,575	46.50	K. Kamalambujammal	INC	18,946	45.01	629
Chengalpattu	12	Ponneri	T. P. Elumalai	INC	26,125	48.41	P. Nagalingam	DMK	15,721	29.13	10,404
Chengalpattu	13	Madhavaram	R. Govindarajulu Naidu	INC	29,896	47.00	A. P. Arasu	DMK	29,646	46.6	250
Madras	14	Saidapet	Munu Adhi	DMK	37,123	58.08	Vinayakam	INC	23,902	37.4	13,221
Chengalpattu	15	Kunnathur	P. Appavoo	INC	20,207	41.61	A. Ratnam	RPI	19,422	40	785
Chengalpattu	16	Chengapattu	C. G. Viswanathan	DMK	27,933	50.32	G. Rajarathana Nayagar	INC	25,809	46.5	2,124
Chengalpattu	17	Maduranthakam	B. Parameswaran	INC	29,743	51.67	P. S. Ellappan	SWA	19,424	33.75	10,319
Chengalpattu	18	Acharapakkam	Venkatasubba Reddy	INC	27,170	48.55	V. Venka	DMK	22,748	40.65	4,422
Chengalpattu	19	Uttangarai	M. Kamalanathan	DMK	33,766	53.71	T. Theerthagiri Gounder	INC	24,276	38.61	9,490
Chengalpattu	20	Kancheepuram	S. V. Natesa Mudaliar	INC	46,018	54.80	C. N. Annadurai	DMK	36,828	43.86	9,190
Chengalpattu	21	Sriperumbudur	M. Bhaktavatsalam	INC	33,825	49.64	Annamalai	DMK	32,588	47.82	1,237
Chengalpattu	22	Tiruvallur	V. S. Arunachalam	INC	21,609	50.19	S. M. Durairaj	DMK	17,175	39.89	4,434
Chengalpattu	23	Kadambathur	Ekambara Mudaliar	INC	17,314	44.28	Govindaswamy Naidu	SWA	10,767	27.54	6,547
Chengalpattu	24	Tiruttani	C. Chiranjeevulu Naidu	Independent	36,884	50.51	E. S. Thyagarajan Mudaliar	INC	34,176	46.81	2,708
Chengalpattu	25	Arakkonam	S. J. Ramaswamy Mudali	DMK	26,586	38.98	B. Bhaktavatsalu Naidu	INC	25,152	36.87	1,434
Chengalpattu	26	Sholinghur	A. M. Ponnuranga Mudaliar	INC	33,291	56.02	V. Munuswamy	DMK	20,762	34.94	12,529
Chengalpattu	27	Cheyyar	K. Govindan	DMK	23,250	41.99	V. Dharmalinga Naicker	INC	22,892	41.35	358
Chengalpattu	28	Vandavasi	S. Muthulingam	DMK	34,922	64.57	D. Dasarathan	INC	19,160	35.43	15,762
Chengalpattu	29	Peranamallur	P. Ramachandra	INC	24,817	49.50	V. D. Annamalai Mudaliar	DMK	16,252	32.41	8,565
North Arcot	30	Arcot	Munirathinam	DMK	28,485	48.26	S. Khader Sheriff	INC	19,705	33.38	8,780
North Arcot	31	Ranipet	Abdul Khaleel	DMK	24,082	39.32	A. E. Chandrasekara Naicker	INC	23,218	37.91	864
North Arcot	32	Katpadi	B. Rajagopal Naidu	INC	26,389	44.19	Natarajan	DMK	20,710	34.68	5,679
North Arcot	33	Gudiyatham	T. Manavalan	INC	25,795	44.97	C. Kuppuswamy	RPI	15,258	26.6	10,537
North Arcot	34	Vellore	R. Jeevarathna Mudaliar	INC	26,739	40.61	M. P. Sarathy	DMK	26,549	40.32	190
North Arcot	35	Virinchipuram	Sampangi Naidu	DMK	23,459	50.40	Krishnamurthi	INC	11,229	24.13	12,230
North Arcot	36	Ambur	P. Rajagopal	INC	25,505	53.73	S. R. Muniswamy	RPI	15,979	33.66	9,526
North Arcot	37	Vaniyambadi	M. P. Vadivel	DMK	27,275	54.86	T. Karia Gounder	INC	20,068	40.37	7,207
North Arcot	38	Tiruppattur (41)	K. Thirupathy Gounder	DMK	32,400	62.38	R. C. Samanna Gounder	INC	19,540	37.62	12,860
North Arcot	39	Chengam	C. K. Chinnaraji Gounder	DMK	34,374	55.22	Y. Shanmugam	INC	25,008	40.17	9,366
North Arcot	40	Polur	Kesava Reddiar	DMK	29,283	62.16	Periasami	INC	17,828	37.84	11,455
North Arcot	41	Arni	C. Kothandarama Bhagavathar	INC	30,773	51.60	A. C. Narasimhan	DMK	23,055	38.66	7,718
North Arcot	42	Thurinjapurma	S. Murugaiyan	DMK	21,163	43.18	Nataraja Mudaliar	INC	13,865	28.29	7,298
North Arcot	43	Tanippadi	A. Arumugam	INC	33,129	56.26	P. S. Santhanam	DMK	25,753	43.74	7,376
North Arcot	44	Tiruvannamalai	P. Palani Pillai	INC	35,148	50.06	P. U. Shanmugham	DMK	33,399	47.57	1,749
Coimbatore	45	Sathyamangalam	Gopal Kounder	INC	23,914	59.63	Anthonisamy	Independent	10,115	25.22	13,799
South Arcot	46	Gingee	Rajaram	INC	29,235	51.53	Aranganathan	SWA	27,494	48.47	1,741
South Arcot	47	Tindivanam	A. Thangavelu	DMK	27,687	45.33	P. Veerappa Gounder	INC	27,422	44.9	265
South Arcot	48	Vanur	A. G. Balakrishnan	DMK	22,463	51.70	S. Kannana	INC	20,987	48.3	1,476
Salem	49	Vazhapadi	Ramasamy Udayar	INC	38,580	54.88	Karipatti T. Ponnumalai	DMK	31,718	45.12	6,862
South Arcot	50	Villupuram	M. Shanmugam	DMK	39,923	59.36	V. P. Sarangapani Gounder	INC	26,115	38.83	13,808
South Arcot	51	Ulundurpet	Manonmani	SWA	25,234	48.16	M. Kandaswamy Padayachi	INC	22,627	43.18	2,607
South Arcot	52	Nellikkuppam	V. Krishnamurthy Gounder	DMK	37,419	56.14	L. Subbarayalu Reddiar	INC	27,989	41.99	9,430
South Arcot	53	Kurinjipadi	N. Rajangam	DMK	32,046	56.48	Jayarama	INC	21,898	38.59	10,148
South Arcot	54	Cuddalore	P. R. Seenivasa Padayachi	INC	27,567	40.72	R. Sambasiva Reddiar	DMK	21,147	31.24	6,420
South Arcot	55	Bhuvanagiri	Ramachandra Rayar	INC	29,434	43.55	Vaithialingam	DMK	27,964	41.38	1,470
South Arcot	56	Chidambaram	S. Sivasubramanian	INC	33,438	53.34	K. Arumugham	DMK	23,837	38.02	9,601
South Arcot	57	Kattumannarkoil	M. R. Krishnamurthi	DMK	27,706	47.14	G. Vageesam Pillai	INC	27,599	46.95	107
South Arcot	58	Vridachalam	G. Boovaraghan	INC	26,990	44.42	M. Selvaraj	DMK	25,138	41.37	1,852
South Arcot	59	Nallur	K. Narayanasami	INC	28,322	55.03	T. Pichamuthu	DMK	20,209	39.27	8,113
South Arcot	60	Tirukoilur	Lakshminarasimma Ammal	INC	27,954	51.26	Balasubramaniam	DMK	14,687	26.93	13,267
South Arcot	61	Rishivandiyam	L. Anandan	INC	25,057	58.82	M. Anadan	DMK	17,544	41.18	7,513
South Arcot	62	Kallakurichi	T. Chinnasamy	DMK	25,084	48.76	P. Vedamanickam	INC	18,837	36.61	6,247
South Arcot	63	Sankarapuram	K. Parthasarathi	INC	26,123	52.71	S. P. Pachaiya Pillai	DMK	23,441	47.29	2,682
Salem	64	Harur	C. Manickam	DMK	26,879	41.33	M. K. Mariappa	INC	22,411	34.46	4,468
Chengalpattu	65	Uthiramerur	O. Srinivasa Reddiar	INC	37,259	58.38	Doraisamy Naicker	Independent	23,313	36.53	13,946
Salem	66	Krishnagiri	Sreeramulu	DMK	38,833	58.47	P. M. Munisamy Gounder	INC	27,583	41.53	11,250
Nilgiris	67	Udagamandalam	T. Karchan	INC	12,732	30.13	K. Bojan	SWA	10,107	23.92	2,625
Salem	68	Hosur	Ramachandra Reddy	INC	25,577	64.46	K. Shamanna	SWA	14,101	35.54	11,476
Salem	69	Pennagaram	M. V. Karivengadam	DMK	26,911	53.86	S. Hemalatha Devi	INC	17,303	34.63	9,608
Salem	70	Dharmapuri	R. S. Veerappa Chettiar	Independent	24,191	40.81	M. Subramania Gounder	DMK	18,754	31.64	5,437
Salem	71	Yercaud	M. Kolandaisamy Gounder	INC	19,921	52.47	Chinna Gounder	DMK	18,048	47.53	1,873
Salem	72	Valavanur	K. M. Krishna Kounder	INC	31,154	55.51	A. Govindasamy	DMK	23,259	41.44	7,895
Salem	73	Salem - I	G. Venkataraman	INC	43,726	50.67	E. R. Krishnan	DMK	39,838	46.16	3,888
Salem	74	Salem - II	A. Rathnavel Gounder	INC	28,811	47.56	S. M. Ramiah	CPI	19,976	32.98	8,835
Salem	75	Veerapandi	S. Arumugam	DMK	30,840	54.78	A. Mariappan	INC	22,171	39.39	8,669
Salem	76	Attur	S. Angamuthu Naicker	INC	23,542	39.28	K. N. Sivaperumal	DMK	19,811	33.05	3,731
Salem	77	Talavasal	A. Doraiswamy	INC	22,286	46.84	K. R. Thangavel	DMK	17,386	36.54	4,900
Salem	78	Rasipuram	N. P. Sengottuvel	DMK	26,846	49.21	Muthuswamy Gounder	INC	26,776	49.08	70
Salem	79	Sendamangalam	V. R. Periannan	DMK	27,728	53.39	P. B. K. Thiagaraja Reddiar	INC	24,205	46.61	3,523
Salem	80	Namakkal	S. Chinnayan	INC	26,756	48.48	K. V. Rasappan	DMK	24,937	45.18	1,819
Salem	81	Kapilamali	V. Velappa Gounder	DMK	36,960	63.82	P. K. Ramalinga Gounder	INC	20,954	36.18	16,006
Salem	82	Mallasamudram	R. Nallamuthu	DMK	18,718	56.30	R. Kandasamy	INC	12,545	37.73	6,173
Salem	83	Tiruchengode	T. M. Kaliannan	INC	24,640	48.64	T. A. Rajavelu	DMK	21,050	41.55	3,590
Salem	84	Sankari	K. S. Subramania Gounder	INC	26,531	48.38	B. Pandarinathan	DMK	17,587	32.07	8,944
Salem	85	Taramangalam	N. S. Sundararajan	INC	30,020	52.65	P. R. Nallathambi Gounder	DMK	26,997	47.35	3,023
Salem	86	Mettur	K. S. Ardhanareeswara Gounder	INC	18,065	34.04	M. Sundaram	PSP	17,620	33.21	445
Coimbatore	87	Bhavani	N. K. Ranganayaki	INC	32,739	49.10	A. M. Raja	DMK	22,919	34.37	9,820
Coimbatore	88	Andhiyur	Perumalraju	INC	22,533	56.01	Kalimuthu	DMK	11,984	29.79	10,549
Coimbatore	89	Gobichettipalayam	Muthuvelappa Gounder	INC	31,977	49.14	Sundaramurthi	SWA	17,249	26.51	14,728
Coimbatore	90	Nambiyur	A. K. Kaliappa Gounder	INC	27,795	55.66	P. A. Saminathan	DMK	16,275	32.59	11,520
Coimbatore	91	Perundurai	N. Nallasenapathi Sarkarai Manrdadiar	INC	36,225	58.41	N. K. Palaniswami	CPI	24,986	40.29	11,239
Coimbatore	92	Erode	A. S. Dhakshinamoorthy Gounder	INC	32,895	39.61	M. Chinnasami Gounder	We Tamils	25,392	30.57	7,503
Coimbatore	93	Chennimalai	K. R. Nallasivam	SOC	35,379	50.82	K. S. periasami Gounder	INC	26,978	38.75	8,401
Coimbatore	94	Kangayam	K. S. Nataraja Gounder	INC	41,006	61.56	M. Palanisamy Gounder	DMK	24,711	37.1	16,295
Coimbatore	95	Dharapuram	Parvathi Anjuman	INC	37,842	57.45	A. R. Subramanian	DMK	18,059	27.42	19,783
Coimbatore	96	Udumalpet	R. rajagopalasami Naicker	INC	29,529	41.72	S. J. Sadiq Pasha	DMK	25,514	36.05	4,015
Coimbatore	97	Anamalai	K. Ponniah	INC	22,474	42.30	Ramasamy	DMK	15,767	29.67	6,707
Coimbatore	98	Pollachi	N. Mahalingam	INC	38,929	56.18	Rangaswamy	DMK	28,780	41.53	10,149
Coimbatore	99	Kovilpalayam	M. P. Muthukaruppasami Kounder	INC	27,464	51.22	K. Gopal	DMK	13,636	25.43	13,828
Coimbatore	100	Palladam	Sengaliappan	INC	33,437	51.66	P. S. Chinnadurai	PSP	14,736	22.77	18,701
Coimbatore	101	Tiruppur	K. N. Palanisamy Gounder	INC	41,748	51.89	Ponnulinga Gounder	CPI	26,175	32.53	15,573
Coimbatore	102	Avanashi	Marappa Gounder	INC	27,009	53.02	M. Ponnusami	SWA	12,196	23.94	14,813
Coimbatore	103	Sulur	C. Kolantaiammal	INC	25,732	38.76	K. N. Chinnaiyan	CPI	21,375	32.19	4,357
Coimbatore	104	Tondamuttur	V. Ellama Naidu	INC	32,520	52.67	L. Arputhaswamy	CPI	12,735	20.63	19,785
Coimbatore	105	Coimbatore - I	G. E. Chinnadurai	INC	38,645	42.10	Rajamanickam	DMK	21,023	22.9	17,622
Coimbatore	106	Coimbatore - II	K. P. Palanisamy	INC	32,313	37.38	N. Marudachalam	CPI	23,948	27.7	8,365
Coimbatore	107	Mettupalayam	N. Shamnugasundaram	INC	25,398	46.90	K. Vellingiri	CPI	19,145	35.36	6,253
Nilgiris	108	Coonoor	J. Matha Gowder	INC	36,668	51.65	J. Belli	DMK	15,103	21.27	21,565
Salem	109	Uddanapalli	Chinna Munisamy Chettiar	SWA	32,860	49.57	K. Muni Reddy	INC	26,278	39.64	6,582
Madurai	110	Palani	Venkidusamy Gounder	Independent	29,908	46.32	Lakshmipathy Raju	INC	22,174	46.32	7,734
Madurai	111	Kodaikanal	M. Alagarsamy	INC	31,062	49.71	Somasundaram	DMK	27,671	44.29	3,391
Madurai	112	Bodinayakanoor	A. S. Subbaraj	INC	35,398	54.61	R. Subbiah	Independent	16,759	25.85	18,639
Madurai	113	Uthamapalayam	M. Rajangam	DMK	28,907	42.99	K. S. Rajagopal	INC	27,368	40.7	1,539
Madurai	114	Theni	S. S. Rajendran	DMK	37,404	59.91	N. R. Thyagarajan	INC	24,610	39.42	12,794
Madurai	115	Andipatti	A. Krishnaveni	INC	19,853	45.68	T. Mokkayan	FL	16,478	37.91	3,375
Madurai	116	Tirumangalam	Thiruvengada Reddiar	INC	34,188	53.58	M. C. M. Muthurama Thevar	SWA	25,919	40.62	8,269
Madurai	117	Usilampatti	P. K. Mookiah Thevar	FL	47,069	67.18	Thinagarasamy Thevar	INC	22,992	32.82	24,077
Madurai	118	Madurai East	P. K. R. Lakshmi Kanthan	INC	36,679	48.11	N. Sankariah	CPI	27,228	35.72	9,451
Madurai	119	Madurai Central	V. Sankaran	INC	32,801	54.60	S. Devasahayam	FL	15,445	25.71	17,356
Madurai	120	Thirupparangundram	Chinnakaruppa Thevar	INC	35,491	42.82	Janakiammal	CPI	25,179	30.38	10,312
Madurai	121	Samayanallur	P. Kakkan	INC	33,091	52.23	G. R. Muniyandi	CPI	16,596	26.19	16,495
Madurai	122	Melur	M. Sivaramanambalam	INC	28,986	43.19	V. V. N. Natarajan	DMK	20,985	31.27	8,001
Madurai	123	Sholavandan	V. Ponnammal	INC	25,911	46.37	A. Muniandi	DMK	18,445	33.01	7,466
Madurai	124	Nilakkottai	Abdul Aziz	INC	20,187	31.75	Anbuchezhiyan	DMK	19,246	30.27	941
Madurai	125	Athoor	V. S. S. Mani	DMK	34,632	50.30	M. A. B. Arumugasamy	INC	29,136	42.32	5,496
Madurai	126	Oddanchatram	A. Senapathi Gounder	INC	30,380	54.25	Nachimuthu Gounder	DMK	24,327	43.44	6,053
Madurai	127	Dindigul	R. Rengaswamy	INC	32,047	48.23	A. Balasubramanian	CPI	29,174	43.91	2,873
Madurai	128	Vadamadurai	M. Maruthanayagam Pillai	INC	27,975	57.97	A. Nallathambi	DMK	18,788	38.93	9,187
Madurai	129	Vedasandur	S. Nanjunda Roy	INC	30,394	48.58	V. Madanagopal	CPI	25,171	40.24	5,223
Tiruchirapalli	130	Aravakurichi	S. Sadasivam	INC	28,372	45.26	C. Muthusami Gounder	SWA	21,082	33.63	7,290
Tiruchirapalli	131	Karur	T. M. Nallasamy	INC	35,969	51.02	K. S. Ramasamy	CPI	20,160	28.59	15,809
Tiruchirapalli	132	Kulittalai	V. Ramanathan	INC	47,243	64.04	N. Rathanam	DMK	26,525	35.96	20,718
Tiruchirapalli	133	Panjapatti	K. Karunagiri Muthiah	INC	25,520	56.27	A. S. Ganapathy	DMK	15,416	33.99	10,104
Tiruchirapalli	134	Manapparai	P. Chinniah Gounder	INC	24,048	42.54	S. Annavi	DMK	19,412	34.34	4,636
Tiruchirapalli	135	Tirumayam	V. Ramaiah	INC	28,219	43.58	V. Balakrishnan	Independent	17,916	27.67	10,303
Tiruchirapalli	136	Alangudi	P. Murugaiyan	DMK	31,438	60.99	V. R. Mangappan	INC	18,472	35.84	12,966
Tiruchirapalli	137	Pudukkottai	A. Thiagarajan	DMK	37,563	64.97	V. Arunachala Thevar	INC	20,252	35.03	17,311
Tiruchirapalli	138	Andanallur	A. Chinnathurai Ambalakaran	INC	32,580	58.29	K. P. Annavi	DMK	20,970	37.52	11,610
Tiruchirapalli	139	Tiruchirappalli - I	M. S. Mani	DMK	31,221	51.37	E. P. Mathuram	INC	28,379	46.69	2,842
Tiruchirapalli	140	Tiruchirappalli - II	M. Kalyanasundaram	CPI	38,281	55.71	T. N. Rajendran	INC	30,436	44.29	7,845
Tiruchirapalli	141	Srirangam	N. Subramanian Chettiar	INC	39,101	54.76	T. Oraisamy	DMK	24,651	34.52	14,450
Tiruchirapalli	142	Musiri	S. Ramalingam	INC	32,155	50.79	A. Dorairaju	DMK	27,661	43.69	4,494
Tiruchirapalli	143	Uppiliapuram	V. A. Muthiah	INC	29,435	47.26	N. Pethu Reddiar	DMK	29,077	46.69	358
Tiruchirapalli	144	Perambalur	T. P. Alagamuthu	DMK	38,686	55.38	R. Rama Reddiar	INC	31,168	44.62	7,518
Tiruchirapalli	145	Vengalam	S. Mani	DMK	24,091	41.66	M. Ayyakannu	INC	22,498	38.9	1,593
Tiruchirapalli	146	Lalgudi	P. Dharmalingam	DMK	38,951	51.85	I. Anthoniswamy	INC	31,707	42.21	7,244
Tiruchirapalli	147	Ariyalur	R. Narayanan	DMK	41,721	64.34	R. Viswanathan	INC	17,681	27.27	24,040
Tiruchirapalli	148	Jayankondam	Jagadambal Velayudam	DMK	33,005	52.16	S. Samikannu Padayachi	INC	24,856	39.28	8,149
Tiruchirapalli	149	T. Palur	S. Ramasami	DMK	40,593	60.06	T. K. Subiah	INC	22,969	33.98	17,624
Thanjavur	150	Tiruvayar	Palani	INC	33,332	53.77	Vaiyapuri Nattar	DMK	24,220	39.07	9,112
Thanjavur	151	Papanasam	R. Subramanian	INC	33,144	53.42	N. Somasundaram	DMK	28,904	46.58	4,240
Thanjavur	152	Saliamangalam	A. Appavoo Thevar	INC	36,259	57.01	Abdul Samad	AIML	11,527	18.12	24,732
Thanjavur	153	Kumbakonam	Ramaswami	INC	32,397	49.72	Krishnamoorthy	DMK	22,704	34.84	9,693
Thanjavur	154	Aduthurai	K. S. Mani	DMK	39,750	53.38	Ramamirtha Thondaman	INC	32,125	43.14	7,625
Thanjavur	155	Kudavasal	P. Jayaraj	INC	29,819	48.64	P. Appasamy	CPI	16,433	26.81	13,386
Thanjavur	156	Mayuram	G. Narayanasamy Naidu	INC	37,362	51.10	Palanisamy Nadar	DMK	25,220	34.49	12,142
Thanjavur	157	Sirkazhi	R. Thangavelu	INC	22,434	35.80	K. B. S. Mani	Independent	15,890	25.36	6,544
Thanjavur	158	Porayar	K. R. sambandam	INC	24,112	39.45	S. Ganesan	DMK	21,018	34.39	3,094
Thanjavur	159	Nannilam	M. D. Thiagaraja Pillai	INC	26,346	39.78	Ramiah Mudaliar	DMK	21,519	32.49	4,827
Thanjavur	160	Tiruvarur	C. M. Ambikapathy	INC	29,384	44.89	S. Vadivelu	CPI	23,993	36.66	5,391
Thanjavur	161	Nagapattinam	A. M. P. S. Balagangadaran	INC	27,447	42.89	G. Bhaktavatchalam	CPI	20,355	31.81	7,092
Thanjavur	162	Vedaranyam	N. S. Ramalingam	INC	27,200	40.09	N. Dharmalingam	DMK	17,764	26.18	9,436
Thanjavur	163	Thiruthuraipundi	A. K. Subbaiah	CPI	45,148	56.28	V. VEdaiyan	INC	35,078	43.72	10,070
Thanjavur	164	Mannargudi	T. S. Swaminatha Odayar	INC	37,117	51.94	P. Narayanasami	DMK	19,021	26.62	18,096
Thanjavur	165	Thanjavur	M. Karunanidhi	DMK	32,145	50.89	A. Y. S. Parisutha Nadar	INC	30,217	47.84	1,928
Thanjavur	166	Gandarvakottai	R. Krishnaswamy Gopalar	INC	24,878	41.99	Govindarasu Kalingarar	DMK	22,061	37.24	2,817
Thanjavur	167	Adiramapattinam	Dhandayuthapani Pillai	INC	31,503	47.33	Marimuthu	PSP	26,104	39.22	5,399
Thanjavur	168	Pattukkottai	V. Arunachala Thevar	DMK	35,151	44.39	R. Srinivasa Iyer	INC	28,806	36.38	6,345
Thanjavur	169	Arantangi	A. Durai Arasan	DMK	33,781	55.25	K. Ramanathan Servai	INC	25,112	41.07	8,669
Ramanathapuram	170	Tiruvadanai	KR. RM. Kariya Manickam Ambalam	SWA	37,612	59.88	S. Ramakrishna Thevar	INC	23,011	36.64	14,601
Ramanathapuram	171	Karaikudi	Saw Ganesan	SWA	27,890	49.31	A. I. Subbiah Ambalam	INC	23,282	41.16	4,608
Ramanathapuram	172	Tirukostiyur	S. Madhavan	DMK	24,833	37.95	N. V. Chokkalingam Ambalam	INC	21,284	32.53	3,549
Ramanathapuram	173	Sivaganga	R. V. Swaminathan	INC	43,410	53.93	Kalailingam	SWA	34,159	42.44	9,251
Ramanathapuram	174	Ramanathapuram	Shanmuga Rajeshwara Sethupathi	INC	44,942	61.92	S. Abdul Rahim	AIML	18,363	25.3	26,579
Ramanathapuram	175	Paramakudi	C. Srinivasa Iyengar	INC	33,301	44.78	S. P. Thangavelan	DMK	22,439	30.17	10,862
Ramanathapuram	176	Manamadurai	K. Cheemaichamy	SWA	33,895	54.62	M. Amin Nainar Howth	INC	26,627	42.91	7,268
Ramanathapuram	177	Tiruchili	A. Perumal	FL	28,524	55.94	M. Vellathurai	INC	18,428	36.14	10,096
Ramanathapuram	178	Mudukulathur	T. L. Sasivarna Thevar	FL	37,162	49.36	Kasinatha Dorai	INC	34,217	45.45	2,945
Ramanathapuram	179	Aruppukkottai	T. Kadambavana Sundaram	INC	35,597	54.54	S. Sowdi Sundara Bharathi	FL	28,583	43.8	7,014
Ramanathapuram	180	Sattur	K. Kamaraj Nadar	INC	46,950	56.38	P. Ramamoorthy	SWA	33,506	40.24	13,444
Ramanathapuram	181	Sivakasi	S. Ramasamy Naidu	INC	35,726	57.62	K. Doraisamy Thevar	SWA	23,078	37.22	12,648
Ramanathapuram	182	Srivilliputhur	M. Chelliah	INC	36,122	57.60	G. Gurusamy	DMK	26,595	42.4	9,527
Ramanathapuram	183	Rajapalayam	R. Krishnasamy Naidu	INC	41,692	51.73	V. Ramakrishna Raja	SWA	19,165	23.78	22,527
Tirunelveli	184	Kovilpatti	N. V. Venugopalakrishnasami	INC	22,158	36.22	R. S. Appasami	SWA	18,059	29.52	4,099
Tirunelveli	185	Kadambur	S. Sangili	INC	19,200	50.29	M. Muthiah	SWA	17,838	46.73	1,362
Tirunelveli	186	Ottapidaram	A. L. Ramakrishna Naicker	INC	30,067	44.17	K. Vaiyappan	SWA	19,906	29.24	10,161
Tirunelveli	187	Tuticorin	Ponnusamy Nadar	INC	31,280	43.88	K. R. Ramalingam	DMK	19,924	27.95	11,356
Tirunelveli	188	Srivaikuntam	A. P. C. Veerabahu	INC	29,949	48.28	S. Pechi	DMK	12,844	20.7	17,105
Tirunelveli	189	Tirunelveli	Rajathi Kunchithapatham	INC	25,985	36.89	Ramasami	SWA	24,544	34.85	1,441
Tirunelveli	190	Gangaikondan	R. S. Arumugam	INC	17,548	34.92	S. Chelliah	Independent	13,780	27.42	3,768
Tirunelveli	191	Alangulam	S. Chellapandian	INC	32,650	51.44	N. H. M. Pandian	SWA	22,438	35.35	10,212
Tirunelveli	192	Puliyangudi	P. Urkavala Kudumbar	INC	23,485	42.69	P. Dorairaj	DMK	13,458	24.46	10,027
Tirunelveli	193	Sankarankoil	S. M. Abdul Majid Sahib	INC	32,799	52.41	S. Krishnan Servai	DMK	16,388	26.19	16,411
Tirunelveli	194	Tenkasi	A. R. Subbiah Mudaliar	INC	29,684	44.33	Reboi Sahib	AIML	16,882	25.21	12,802
Tirunelveli	195	Ambasamudram	G. Gomathisankara Dikshithar	INC	25,883	38.16	A. Nallasivan	CPI	20,216	29.81	5,667
Tirunelveli	196	Kadayam	A. B. Balagan	INC	46,160	67.75	R. V. Ananthakrishnan	CPI	13,821	20.28	32,339
Tirunelveli	197	Tiruchendur	M. S. Selvarajan	INC	39,944	58.00	S. P. Adithanar	We Tamils	27,994	40.65	11,950
Tirunelveli	198	Sathankulam	K. T. Kosalram	INC	43,428	68.42	A. P. Rajsingh	We Tamils	17,351	27.33	26,077
Tirunelveli	199	Radhapuram	N. Soundrapandian	INC	42,334	67.04	P. R. Carmel	SWA	19,271	30.52	23,063
Tirunelveli	200	Nanguneri	M. G. Sankar	INC	28,548	43.97	S. Madasamy	SWA	23,211	35.75	5,337
Kanyakumari	201	Kanyakumari	B. Natarajan	INC	46,263	80.58	S. Rassiah	PSP	9,825	17.11	36,438
Kanyakumari	202	Nagercoil	A. Chidambaranatha Nadar	INC	37,079	54.13	M. C. Balan	DMK	17,318	25.28	19,761
Kanyakumari	203	Colachel	A. Swamidhes Nadar	Independent	36,054	55.64	Lourdammal Simon	INC	28,275	43.63	7,779
Kanyakumari	204	Killiyur	R. Ponnappan Nadar	INC	25,278	60.05	G. Devadas	Independent	9,872	23.45	15,406
Kanyakumari	205	Padmanabapuram	Kunjan Nadar (Rayan Nadar)	Independent	23,747	46.47	Francis	CPI	11,572	22.65	12,175
Kanyakumari	206	Vilavancode	M. William	INC	30,386	58.19	D. Gnanasigamony	CPI	21,388	40.96	8,998

== See also ==
- Elections in Tamil Nadu
- Legislature of Tamil Nadu
- Government of Tamil Nadu
