= Venkatasubba Reddy =

Indian politician

Member of the Madras State Assembly
- In office 1962–1967
- Preceded by: E. Ramakrishnan
- Constituency: Acharapakkam

Personal details
- Party: Indian National Congress

Venkatasubba Reddy was an Indian politician and former Member of the Legislative Assembly of Tamil Nadu. He was elected to the Tamil Nadu legislative assembly as an Indian National Congress candidate from Acharapakkam constituency in 1962 election.
