= R. Krishnan =

R. Krishnan may refer to:

- R. Krishnan (director) (1909–1997), Indian film director, of the duo Krishnan–Panju
- R. Krishnan (Vasudevanallur politician), Indian politician
- R. Krishnan (Pattali Makkal Katchi politician), Indian politician
- R. S. Krishnan (1911–1999), Indian physicist
- Ramanathan Krishnan (born 1937), Indian tennis player
- Ramesh Krishnan (born 1961), Indian tennis player
