= M. R. Kannan =

Member of Tamil Nadu Legislative Assembly
- In office 1967–1971
- Preceded by: T. N. Anandanayaki
- Constituency: Basin Bridge
- In office 1971–1976

Personal details
- Born: 13 July 1922 Chengalpattu
- Party: DMK

M. R. Kannan (born 1922) was an Indian politician and a former Member of the Tamil Nadu Legislative Assembly. Kannan was born in Chengalpattu and later resided on Annappillai Street in Chennai. He received his education at M. P. U. High School and at Hindu Theological High School in Chennai. He was a member of the Dravida Munnetra Kazhagam (DMK). Kannan was elected as a Member of the Tamil Nadu Legislative Assembly from the Basin Bridge constituency as a DMK candidate in the 1967 and 1971 Tamil Nadu Legislative Assembly elections.

== Elections contested ==
Year	Constitution	Party	Result	Votes	%
1967	Basin Bridge	DMK	Won	40,109	52.38
1971	Basin Bridge	DMK	Won	48,959	55.39

== Electoral performance ==
Election	Constituency	Political party	Result	Vote %	Opposition			Ref
Election	Constituency	Political party	Result	Vote %	Candidate	Political party	Vote %	Ref
1967	Basin Bridge	DMK	Won	53.81%	K. Ramadoss	INC	41.26%	
1971	Basin Bridge	DMK	Won	56.73%	K. Ramadoss	INC	38.44%	
