= O. Srinivasa Reddiar =

Former legislative member of Tamil Nadu assembly

O. Srinivasan Reddiar

Member of the Madras Legislative Assembly
- In office 1962–1967
- Preceded by: V. K. Ramaswami Mudaliar
- Succeeded by: K. M. Rajagopal
- Constituency: Uthiramerur constituency

Personal details
- Born: 30 May 1920
- Party: Indian National Congress
- Profession: former

O. Srinivasan Reddiar was an Indian politician and a former Member of the Tamil Nadu Legislative Assembly. He was from the village of Kaliyampoondi in Kanchipuram district. A member of the Indian National Congress party, he contested and won the 1962 Tamil Nadu Legislative Assembly election from the Uthiramerur constituency.

== Electoral performance ==
1962 Madras Legislative Assembly election: Uthiramerur
Party	Candidate	Votes	%	±%
INC	O. Srinivasa Reddiar	33,766	53.71%	+15.29
Independent	Doraswamy Naicker	24,276	38.61%	New
Independent	K. C. Deenadayalu Naidu	1,705	2.71%	New
Tamilnad Socialist Labour Party	T .G. Sundaramoorthy	1,421	2.26%	New
Independent	P. Muthumari Pillai	771	1.23%	New
SWA	Chinna Kannu Naicker	630	1.00%	New
Margin of victory		9,490	15.09%	12.26%
Turnout		62,871	77.76%	23.36%
Registered electors		84,188		
INC gain from Independent		Swing	12.46%	
