= Ambedkar Makkal Iyakkam =

Ambedkar People Movement Ambedkar Makkal Iyakkam
- Abbreviation: AMI
- President: Vai.Ramalingam
- General Secretary: Siva.Murugesan
- Founder: V. Balasundaram
- Founded: 1970
- Ideology: Ambedkarism; Social justice

Party flag
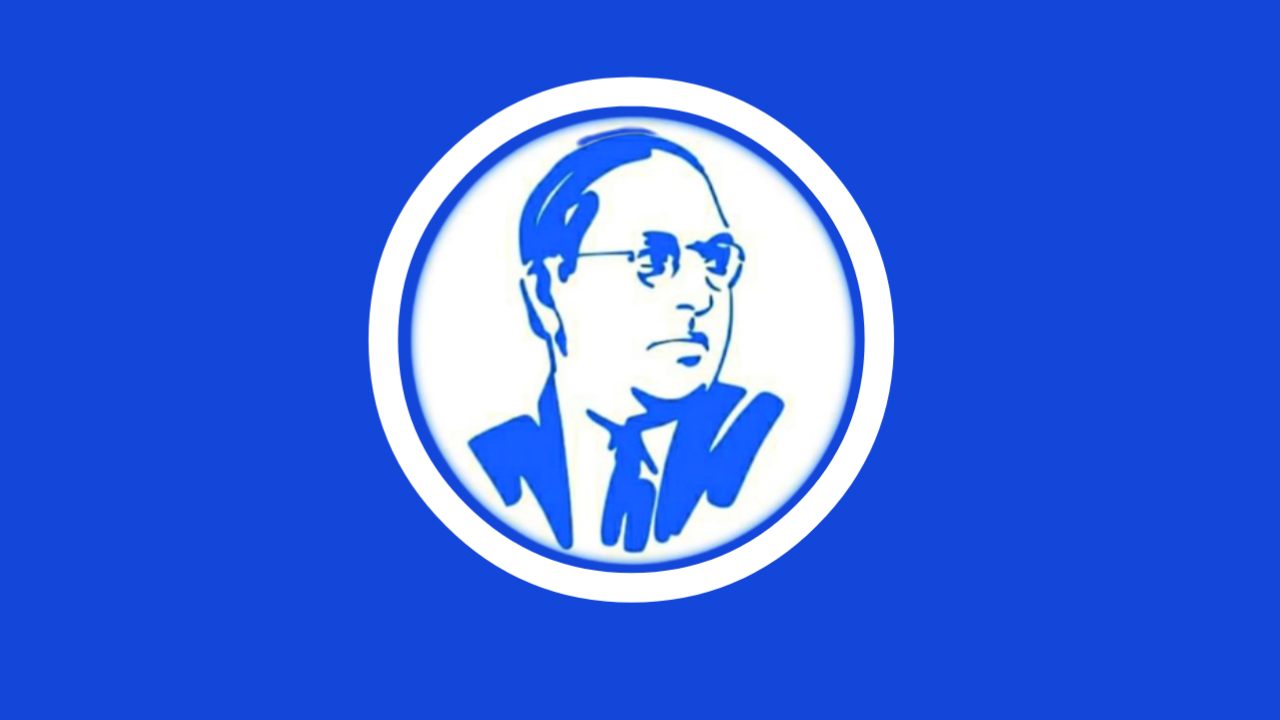

Ambedkar Makkal Iyakkam (Ambedkar People Movement) is a political movement in the Indian state of Tamil Nadu working for the upliftment of Dalits. The founder of AMI was Dr. V. Balasundaram. Dr.Vai. Balasundaram formed 'Ambedkar People Movement' in 1977 in a ceremony held at Rajaji Hall, Chennai, in the esteemed presence of Mr. Prabhudas Patwari, Hon’ble then Governor of Tamil Nadu.Ambedkar Makkal Iyakkam is constantly fighting for social welfare, equality, human rights, women welfare, Panchami Land recovery and educational upliftment. After demise of Vai Balasundaram, his brother Vai.Ramalingam was elected as president for the party in the general body meeting held at Pudukkottai on 25 January 2020. In that same general body meeting Siva.Murugesan was elected as General Secretary for the party.
