= U. P. Mathaiyan =

Indian politician

U. P. Mathaiyan is an Indian politician and former Member of the Legislative Assembly of Tamil Nadu. He was elected to the Tamil Nadu Legislative Assembly as an Anna Dravida Munnetra Kazhagam candidate from Anthiyur constituency in 1984 election.

== Electoral performance ==
Election	Constituency	Political party	Result	Vote %	Opposition			Ref
Election	Constituency	Political party	Result	Vote %	Candidate	Political party	Vote %	Ref
1984	Anthiyur	AIADMK	Won	69.75%	S. Lakshmi	DMK	29.13%	
1989	Anthiyur	AIADMK	Lost	11.28%	V. Periasamy	AIADMK	37.31%	
