= E. M. Natarajan =

Indian politician

Member of the Tamil Nadu Legislative Assembly
- In office 1971–1977
- Constituency: Anthiyur

Member of the Madras State Legislative Assembly
- In office 1967–1971
- Constituency: Anthiyur

Personal details
- Party: Dravida Munnetra Kazhagam

E. M. Natarajan (died 28 April 2001) was an Indian politician and former Member of the Legislative Assembly of Tamil Nadu. He was elected to the Tamil Nadu legislative assembly as a Dravida Munnetra Kazhagam candidate from Anthiyur constituency in 1967 and 1971 elections.

== Electoral performance ==
Election	Constituency	Political party	Result	Vote %	Opposition			Ref
Election	Constituency	Political party	Result	Vote %	Candidate	Political party	Vote %	Ref
1967	Anthiyur	DMK	Won	55.99%	Gurumurthi	INC	44.01%	
1971	Anthiyur	DMK	Won	56.79%	K. S. Nanjappan	INC	43.21%	
