= Mallasamudram Assembly constituency =

Coordinates: 11.495°N 78.030°E

Mallasamudram
- Former constituency for the Tamil Nadu Legislative Assembly

Constituency details
- Country: India
- Region: South India
- State: Tamil Nadu
- District: Namakkal
- Lok Sabha constituency: Namakkal
- Established: 1962
- Abolished: 1967
- Total electors: 75,078
- Reservation: None

Mallasamudram was one of the 206 constituencies in the Tamil Nadu Legislative Assembly of Tamil Nadu, a southern state of India. It was in Namakkal district and it was also part of Namakkal Lok Sabha constituency.

== Members of the Legislative Assembly ==
| Year | Winner | Party |
|---|---|---|
| 1962 | R. Nallamuthu | Dravida Munnetra Kazhagam |

== Election results ==
Vote share of winning candidates
| 1962 | 56.30% |

=== 1962 ===
1962 Madras Legislative Assembly election: Mallasamudram
| Party | Candidate | Votes | % | ±% |
|---|---|---|---|---|
| DMK | R. Nallamuthu | 18,718 | 56.30% | |
| INC | R. Kanadasamy | 12,545 | 37.73% | |
| We Tamils | V. Muthu | 1,530 | 4.60% | |
| Independent | S. Vaiyapuri | 454 | 1.37% | |
| Margin of victory | | 6,173 | 18.57% | |
| Turnout | | 33,247 | 46.10% | |
| Registered electors | | 75,078 | | |
| DMK win (new seat) | | | | |
