= Virinchipuram Assembly constituency =

Coordinates: 12.92°N 79.02°E

Virinchipuram
- Former constituency for the Tamil Nadu Legislative Assembly

Constituency details
- Country: India
- Region: South India
- State: Tamil Nadu
- District: Vellore
- Established: 1962
- Abolished: 1967
- Reservation: None

Virinchipuram is a former state assembly constituency in Vellore district, Tamil Nadu, India. It existed from 1962 to 1971.

== Members of the Legislative Assembly ==
Year	Winner	Party
1962	Sampangi Naidu	Dravida Munnetra Kazhagam

== Election results ==
Vote share of winning candidates
1962	50.40%

=== 1962 ===
1962 Madras Legislative Assembly election: Virinchipuram
Party	Candidate	Votes	%	±%
DMK	Sampangi Naidu	23,459	50.40%	
INC	Krishnamurthi	11,229	24.13%	
Independent	R. Radhakrishnan	5,489	11.79%	
Independent	A. M. Jayaraman	2,043	4.39%	
Independent	Neduncheralathan	1,826	3.92%	
SWA	Narayanaswami Mudaliar	1,339	2.88%	
Independent	T. R. Rangasamy Reddiar	587	1.26%	
Independent	V. P. Kuppusamy Gounder	570	1.22%	
Margin of victory		12,230	26.28%	
Turnout		46,542	60.45%	
Registered electors		82,644		
DMK win (new seat)				
