= Kadambathur Assembly constituency =

Former assembly constituency of Tamil Nadu, India

Coordinates: 13.10°N 79.86°E

Kadambathur
- Former constituency for the Tamil Nadu Legislative Assembly

Constituency details
- Country: India
- Region: South India
- State: Tamil Nadu
- District: Thiruvallur
- Established: 1962
- Abolished: 1971
- Reservation: None

Kadambathur was a state assembly constituency in Thiruvallur district, Tamil Nadu, India. It existed from 1962 to 1971.

== Members of the Legislative Assembly ==
Year	Winner	Party
1971	A Parandhaman	Dravida Munnetra Kazhagam
1967	C. V. M. Annamalai	Dravida Munnetra Kazhagam
1962	Ekambara Mudaliar	Indian National Congress

== Election results ==
Vote share of winning candidates
1971	67.11%
1967	66.68%
1962	44.28%

=== 1971 ===
1971 Tamil Nadu Legislative Assembly election: Kadambathur
Party	Candidate	Votes	%	±%
DMK	A Parandhaman	38,569	67.11%	0.43%
INC	Era Kulasekaran	18,903	32.89%	−0.43%
Margin of victory		19,666	34.22%	0.87%
Turnout		57,472	72.27%	−9.92%
Registered electors		85,210		
DMK hold		Swing	0.43%	

=== 1967 ===
1967 Madras Legislative Assembly election: Kadambathur
Party	Candidate	Votes	%	±%
DMK	C. V. M. Annamalai	43,499	66.68%	
INC	C. C. Naidu	21,741	33.32%	−10.96%
Margin of victory		21,758	33.35%	16.61%
Turnout		65,240	82.19%	22.34%
Registered electors		82,750		
DMK gain from INC		Swing	22.39%	

=== 1962 ===
1962 Madras Legislative Assembly election: Kadambathur
Party	Candidate	Votes	%	±%
INC	Ekambara Mudaliar	17,314	44.28%	
SWA	Govindaswamy Naidu	10,767	27.54%	
Independent	P. Srinivasan	6,143	15.71%	
Independent	Chengalvaraya Naidu	2,554	6.53%	
Independent	K. Thiruvengidam	2,320	5.93%	
Margin of victory		6,547	16.75%	
Turnout		39,098	59.85%	
Registered electors		69,958		
INC win (new seat)				
