= Anamalai Assembly constituency =

Former legislative Assembly constituency in Andhra Pradesh, India

Coordinates: 10.58°N 76.93°E

Anamalai
- Former constituency for the Tamil Nadu Legislative Assembly

Constituency details
- Country: India
- Region: South India
- State: Tamil Nadu
- District: Coimbatore
- Established: 1962
- Abolished: 1962
- Reservation: None

Anamalai was one of the 234 constituencies in the Tamil Nadu Legislative Assembly of Tamil Nadu, a southern state of India. It was in Coimbatore district.

== Members of the Legislative Assembly ==
Year	Winner	Party
1962	K. Ponniah	Indian National Congress

== Election results ==
Vote share of winning candidates
1962	42.30%

=== Assembly election 1962 ===
1962 Madras State Legislative Assembly election : Anamalai
Party	Candidate	Votes	%	±%
INC	K. Ponniah	22,474	42.30%	New
DMK	Ramasamy	15,767	29.67%	New
CPI	A. T. Karuppiah	10,376	19.53%	New
PSP	S. N. Palamisamy	3,206	6.03%	New
Independent	Marathumuthu	1,311	2.47%	New
Margin of victory		6,707	12.62%	
Turnout		55,027	66.08%	
Total valid votes		53,134		
Registered electors		83,269		
INC win (new seat)				
