= P. Guruswamy =

Indian politician

P. Guruswamy is an Indian politician and former Member of the Legislative Assembly of Tamil Nadu. He was elected to the Tamil Nadu legislative assembly as an Anna Dravida Munnetra Kazhagam candidate from the Anthiyur constituency in the 1977 and 1980 elections.

== Electoral performance ==
Election	Constituency	Political party	Result	Vote %	Opposition			Ref
Election	Constituency	Political party	Result	Vote %	Candidate	Political party	Vote %	Ref
1977	Anthiyur	AIADMK	Won	42.46%	A. Palani	JP	20.25%	
1980	Anthiyur	AIADMK	Won	57.06%	T. G. Vadivel	DMK	34.17%	
