= C. Ganesan =

Indian politician

C. Ganesan was an Indian politician and former Member of the Legislative Assembly of Tamil Nadu. He was elected to the Tamil Nadu legislative assembly as an Anna Dravida Munnetra Kazhagam candidate from Acharapakkam constituency in 1980 election.
