= A. G. Venkatachalam =

Indian politician

Member of the Tamil Nadu Legislative Assembly
- In office 12 May 2021 – 4 May 2026
- Preceded by: E. M. R. Raja @ Rajakrishnan. K.
- Succeeded by: P. Haribaskar
- Constituency: Anthiyur

Personal details
- Party: Dravida Munnetra Kazhagam

A. G. Venkatachalam is an Indian politician who is a Member of Legislative Assembly of Tamil Nadu. He was elected from Anthiyur as a Dravida Munnetra Kazhagam candidate in 2021.

== Elections contested ==
Election	Constituency	Party	Result	Vote %	Runner-up	Runner-up Party	Runner-up vote %	Ref.
2021 Tamil Nadu Legislative Assembly election	Anthiyur	DMK	Won	44.84%	K. S. Shanmugavel	AIADMK	44.12%	
2016 Tamil Nadu Legislative Assembly election	Anthiyur	DMK	Lost	39.07%	E. M. R. Raja Alias Rajakrishnan. K. R	AIADMK	42.21%	
