= Kudavasal Assembly constituency =

Coordinates: 10.856°N 79.481°E

Kudavasal
- Former constituency for the Tamil Nadu Legislative Assembly

Constituency details
- Country: India
- Region: South India
- State: Tamil Nadu
- District: Tiruvarur
- Established: 1962
- Abolished: 1971
- Total electors: 81,818
- Reservation: None

Kudavasal was former state assembly constituency in Tiruvarur district, Tamil Nadu, India. It existed from 1962 to 1971.

== Members of the Legislative Assembly ==
Year	Winner	Party
1971	K. Periasamy	Dravida Munnetra Kazhagam
1967	C. Krishnamoorthi	Dravida Munnetra Kazhagam
1962	P. Jayaraj	Indian National Congress

== Election results ==
Vote share of winning candidates
1971	47.75%
1967	54.96%
1962	48.64%

=== 1971 ===
1971 Tamil Nadu Legislative Assembly election: Kudavasal
Party	Candidate	Votes	%	±%
DMK	K. Periasamy	31,302	47.75%	−7.21%
INC	Daksinamoorthy Kalingaraya	23,576	35.97%	−9.08%
CPI(M)	Veeraiyan G.	10,221	15.59%	
Independent	Uruthirapathy Nadar K. S.	453	0.69%	
Margin of victory		7,726	11.79%	1.87%
Turnout		65,552	82.59%	−2.31%
Registered electors		81,818		
DMK hold		Swing	-7.21%	

=== 1967 ===
1967 Madras Legislative Assembly election: Kudavasal
Party	Candidate	Votes	%	±%
DMK	C. Krishnamoorthi	34,880	54.96%	
INC	M. D. T. Pillai	28,585	45.04%	−3.60%
Margin of victory		6,295	9.92%	−11.92%
Turnout		63,465	84.89%	12.72%
Registered electors		76,794		
DMK gain from INC		Swing	6.32%	

=== 1962 ===
1962 Madras Legislative Assembly election: Kudavasal
Party	Candidate	Votes	%	±%
INC	P. Jayaraj	29,819	48.64%	
CPI	P. Appasamy	16,433	26.81%	
SWA	M. S. Veeraiah	12,083	19.71%	
Independent	C. Chinnaniyan	1,961	3.20%	
Independent	U. Krishnan	1,006	1.64%	
Margin of victory		13,386	21.84%	
Turnout		61,302	72.17%	
Registered electors		89,549		
INC win (new seat)				
