= Vengalam Assembly constituency =

Coordinates: 11.38°N 78.79°E

Vengalam
- Former constituency for the Tamil Nadu Legislative Assembly

Constituency details
- Country: India
- Region: South India
- State: Tamil Nadu
- District: Perambalur
- Lok Sabha constituency: Perambalur
- Established: 1962
- Abolished: 1967
- Total electors: 97,574
- Reservation: None

Vengalam was former constituency in the Tamil Nadu Legislative Assembly of Tamil Nadu, a southern state of India. It was in Perambalur district.

== Members of the Legislative Assembly ==
Year	Winner	Party
1962	S. Mani	Dravida Munnetra Kazhagam

== Election results ==
Vote share of winning candidates
1962	41.66%

=== 1962 ===
1962 Madras Legislative Assembly election: Vengalam
Party	Candidate	Votes	%	±%
DMK	S. Mani	24,091	41.66%	
INC	M. Ayyakannu	22,498	38.90%	
SWA	M. Palanimuthu	11,241	19.44%	
Margin of victory		1,593	2.75%	
Turnout		57,830	62.82%	
Registered electors		97,574		
DMK win (new seat)				
