= N. V. Natarajan =

Indian politician (1912–1975)

Tamil Nadu Minister of Labour and Backward Classes
- In office 1969–1975
- First Minister: M. Karunanidhi

Organisation Secretary of DMK
- In office 1959–1972
- Preceded by: Position established
- Succeeded by: P. U. Shanmugam

Member of the Tamil Nadu Legislative Council
- In office 1964–1975

Personal details
- Born: 12 November 1912 India
- Died: 3 August 1975 (aged 62)
- Party: Dravida Munnetra Kazhagam
- Other political affiliations: Justice Party

N. V. Natarajan was an Indian politician of the Dravida Munnetra Kazhagam (DMK) and Member of the Legislative Assembly of Tamil Nadu. He was a founding member of the DMK. He served as the Minister of Labour and Backward Classes in the Tamil Nadu government during 1969–1975.

== Biography ==
N. V. Natarajan was born on 12 November 1912 in a famous Mudaliar Thuluva Vellala merchant family of Madras. Initially, he was a member of the Indian National Congress. From 1938 to 1946, he was a member of the Justice Party (later renamed as Dravidar Kazhagam). In 1949, he, together with C. N. Annadurai, K. A. Mathiazhagan, E. V. K. Sampath and V. R. Nedunchezhiyan, split from the Dravidar Kazhagam and formed the Dravida Munnetra Kazhagam. He was the party's organisational secretary from 1960 until his death. He unsuccessfully contested the 1957 and 1962 assembly elections from the Basin Bridge constituency. In 1964, he was nominated to the Tamil Nadu Legislative Council. He was the minister for Labour and Backward Classes in the M. Karunanidhi cabinet during 1969-75. He died on 3 August 1975.

Natarajan and his wife, Bhuvaneshwari Natarajan, had seven children. One of his sons, N. V. N. Somu, later became a member of Parliament as a DMK candidate.

== Electoral performance ==
Election	Constituency	Political party	Result	Vote %	Opposition			Ref
Election	Constituency	Political party	Result	Vote %	Candidate	Political party	Vote %	Ref
1957	Basin Bridge	Independent	Lost	39.65%	T. N. Anandanayaki	INC	56.41%	
1962	Basin Bridge	DMK	Lost	41.68%	T. N. Anandanayaki	INC	50.63%	
