= Nambiyur Assembly constituency =

Indian constituency

Coordinates: 11.36°N 77.32°E

Nambiyur
- Former constituency for the Tamil Nadu Legislative Assembly

Constituency details
- Country: India
- Region: South India
- State: Tamil Nadu
- District: Erode
- Lok Sabha constituency: 0
- Established: 1951
- Abolished: 1962
- Total electors: 76,281

Nambiyur was assembly constituency in Tamil Nadu. The elections conducted in the constituency and winners are listed below.

== Members of Legislative Assembly ==
Year	Winner	Party
1952	P. G. Manickam & P. G. Karuthiruman	Indian National Congress
1957	K. L. Ramaswami	Indian National Congress
1962	A. K. Kaliappa Gounder	Indian National Congress

== Election results ==
Vote share of winning candidates
1962	55.66%
1952	88.75%

=== 1962 ===
1962 Madras Legislative Assembly election: Nambiyur
Party	Candidate	Votes	%	±%
INC	A. K. Kaliappa Goundar	27,795	55.66%	
DMK	P. A. Saminathan	16,275	32.59%	
SWA	S. K. Sami Gounder	5,867	11.75%	
Margin of victory		11,520	23.07%	
Turnout		49,937	69.30%	69.30%
Registered electors		76,281		
INC hold		Swing		

=== 1957 ===
1957 Madras Legislative Assembly election: Nambiyur
Party	Candidate	Votes	%	±%
INC	K. L. Ramaswami	Unopposed		
Registered electors		77,537		
INC hold		Swing		

=== 1952 ===
1952 Madras Legislative Assembly election: Nambiyur
Party	Candidate	Votes	%	±%
INC	P. G. Karuthiruman	46,889	88.75%	88.75%
INC	P. G. Manickam	44,789	84.78%	84.78%
Independent	C. K. Subramanian Gounder	33,116	62.68%	
RPI	K. A. Palaniappan	14,476	27.40%	
TTP	K. S. Krishnaswami Pillai	10,788	20.42%	
Independent	Mariappa	9,404	17.80%	
Margin of victory		2,100	3.97%	
Turnout		52,831	66.86%	
Registered electors		79,022		
INC win (new seat)				
