= S. Mathivanan =

Indian politician

S. Mathivanan is an Indian politician and former Member of the Legislative Assembly of Tamil Nadu. He was elected to the Tamil Nadu Legislative Assembly as a Dravida Munnetra Kazhagam candidate from Acharapakkam constituency in 1996 election.
