= A. K. Kaliappa Gounder =

Tamil Nadu politician

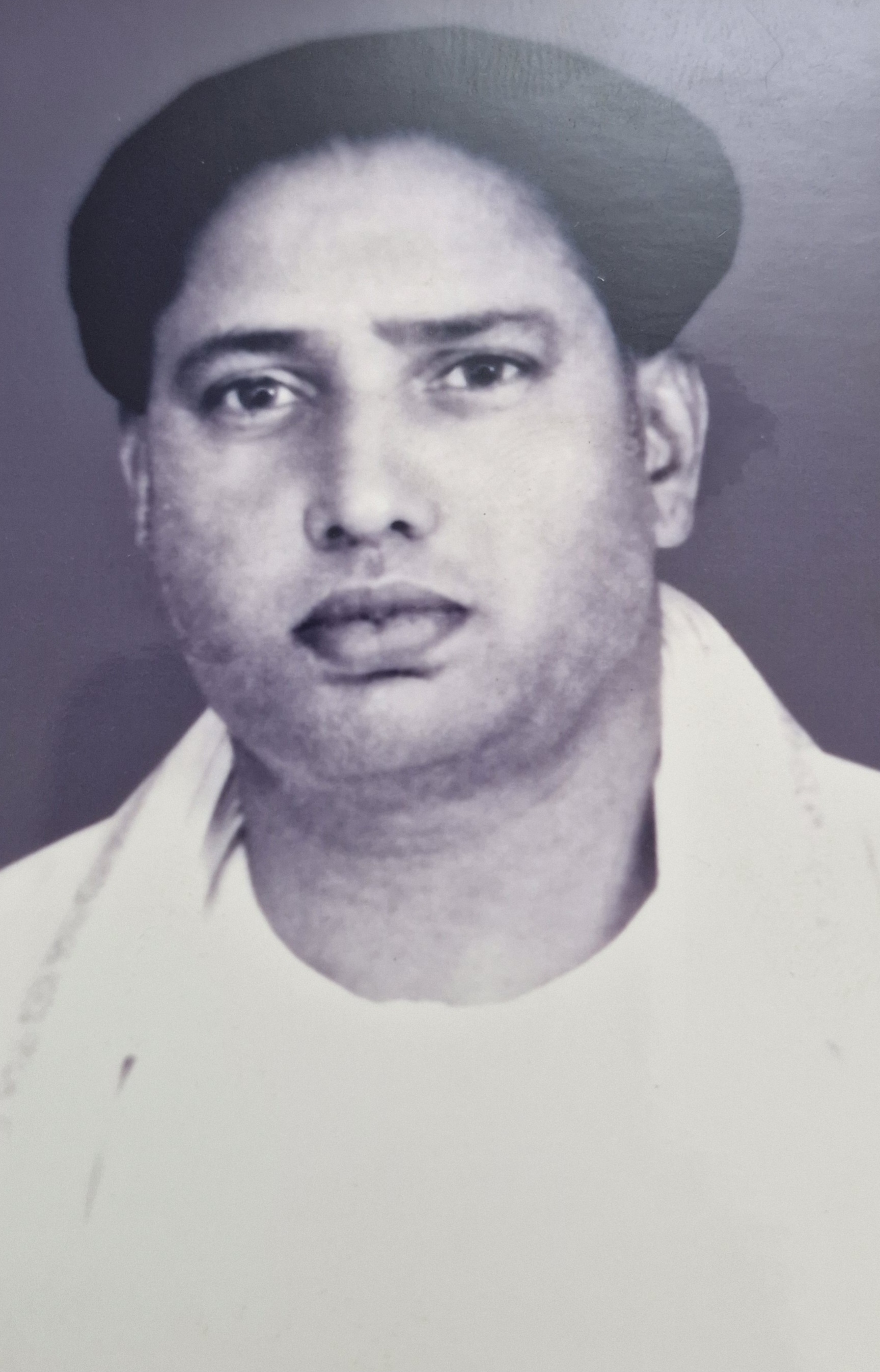

Member of the Tamil Nadu Legislative Assembly
- In office 1962–1967
- Preceded by: K. L. Ramasamy
- Constituency: Nambiyur

Chairman of Sathyamangalam Panchayat Union

Personal details
- Born: 6 October 1913
- Died: 11 June 1991 (aged 77)
- Party: Indian National Congress
- Children: 6
- Profession: Agriculturist

A. K. Kaliappa Gounder was an Indian politician and a former Member of the Legislative Assembly (MLA) of Tamil Nadu. Hailing from the Shanarpalayam area in the Erode district, he was a member of the Indian National Congress party.

In the 1962 Tamil Nadu Legislative Assembly elections, he contested from the Nambiyur Assembly constituency and emerged victorious. Additionally, he served as the Chairman of the Sathyamangalam Panchayat Union, having been elected unopposed to the position twice.

== Electoral Performance ==
=== 1962 ===
1962 Madras Legislative Assembly election: Nambiyur
Party	Candidate	Votes	%	±%
INC	A. K. Kaliappa Goundar	27,795	55.66%	
DMK	P. A. Saminathan	16,275	32.59%	
SWA	S. K. Sami Gounder	5,867	11.75%	
Margin of victory		11,520	23.07%	
Turnout		49,937	69.30%	69.30%
Registered electors		76,281		
INC hold		Swing		
