= A. Selvaraj =

Indian politician

Member of the Tamilnadu Legislative Assembly for Acharapakkam constituency
- In office 13 May 2001 – 29 January 2002

Personal details
- Party: Pattali Makkal Katchi

A. Selvaraj is an Indian politician and former Member of the Legislative Assembly of Tamil Nadu. He was elected to the Tamil Nadu legislative assembly as a Pattali Makkal Katchi candidate from Acharapakkam constituency in 2001 election.
