= Puliyangudi Assembly constituency =

Coordinates: 9.17°N 77.39°E

Puliyangudi
- Former constituency for the Tamil Nadu Legislative Assembly

Constituency details
- Country: India
- Region: South India
- State: Tamil Nadu
- District: Tenkasi
- Lok Sabha constituency: Tenkasi
- Established: 1962
- Abolished: 1967
- Total electors: 91,260

Puliyangudi former constituency in the Tamil Nadu Legislative Assembly of Tamil Nadu, a southern state of India. It was in Tenkasi district and it was also part of Tenkasi Lok Sabha constituency.

== Members of the Legislative Assembly ==
Year	Winner	Party
1962	P. Urukavala Kudumbar	Indian National Congress

== Election results ==
Vote share of winning candidates
1962	42.69%

=== 1962 ===
1962 Madras Legislative Assembly election: Puliyangudi
Party	Candidate	Votes	%	±%
INC	P. Urukavala Kudumbar	23,485	42.69%	
DMK	P. Dorai Raj	13,458	24.46%	
CPI	S, Periasami	8,673	15.76%	
SWA	V. Karadi Madasamy	7,453	13.55%	
Independent	K. Shunmugam	1,950	3.54%	
Margin of victory		10,027	18.22%	
Turnout		55,019	63.46%	
Registered electors		91,260		
INC win (new seat)				
