= Basin Bridge Assembly constituency =

Former legislative Assembly constituency in Andhra Pradesh, India

Coordinates: 13.1013672°N 80.2682343°E

Basin Bridge
- Former constituency for the Tamil Nadu Legislative Assembly

Constituency details
- Country: India
- Region: South India
- State: Tamil Nadu
- District: Chennai
- Lok Sabha constituency: Chennai North
- Established: 1957
- Abolished: 1971
- Total electors: 1,35,430
- Reservation: None

Basin Bridge was an assembly constituency in Tamil Nadu. The elections conducted in the constituency and winners are listed below.

== Members of the Legislative Assembly ==
| Election | Member | Party |
|---|---|---|
| 1957 | T. N. Anandanayaki | Indian National Congress |
| 1962 | T. N. Anandanayaki | Indian National Congress |
| 1967 | M. R. Kannan | Dravida Munnetra Kazhagam |
| 1971 | M. R. Kannan | Dravida Munnetra Kazhagam |

Madras State

== Election results ==
Vote share of winning candidates
| 1971 | 56.73% |
| 1967 | 53.81% |
| 1962 | 50.63% |
| 1957 | 56.41% |

=== Assembly election 1971 ===
1971 Tamil Nadu Legislative Assembly election : Basin Bridge
| Party | Candidate | Votes | % | ±% |
|---|---|---|---|---|
| DMK | M. R. Kannan | 48,959 | 56.73% | ▲2.92 |
| INC | K. Ramadoss | 33,174 | 38.44% | New |
| CPI(M) | K. M. Hari Bhatt | 2,312 | 2.68% | New |
| Independent | A. Varadadesikan | 1,184 | 1.37% | |
| Independent | K. Muthiah | 672 | 0.78% | |
| Margin of victory | | 15,785 | 18.29% | ▲5.74 |
| Turnout | | 88,376 | 65.26% | ▼9.43 |
| Total valid votes | | 86,301 | | |
| Registered electors | | 135,430 | | ▲32.11 |
| DMK hold | | Swing | | |

=== Assembly election 1967 ===
1967 Madras State Legislative Assembly election : Basin Bridge
| Party | Candidate | Votes | % | ±% |
|---|---|---|---|---|
| DMK | M. R. Kannan | 40,109 | 53.81% | ▲12.13 |
| INC | K. Ramadoss | 30,757 | 41.26% | ▼9.37 |
| CPI | G. Kannan | 3,450 | 4.63% | New |
| Margin of victory | | 9,352 | 12.55% | ▲3.60 |
| Turnout | | 76,571 | 74.69% | ▲1.69 |
| Total valid votes | | 74,545 | | |
| Registered electors | | 102,515 | | ▲16.14 |
| DMK gain from INC | | Swing | ▲3.18 | |

=== Assembly election 1962 ===
1962 Madras State Legislative Assembly election : Basin Bridge
| Party | Candidate | Votes | % | ±% |
|---|---|---|---|---|
| INC | T. N. Anandanayaki | 31,477 | 50.63% | ▼5.78 |
| DMK | N. V. Natarajan | 25,913 | 41.68% | New |
| SWA | V. S. Kannan | 3,554 | 5.72% | New |
| Independent | T. Kannan | 1,221 | 1.96% | |
| Margin of victory | | 5,564 | 8.95% | ▼7.81 |
| Turnout | | 64,434 | 73.00% | ▲30.70 |
| Total valid votes | | 62,165 | | |
| Registered electors | | 88,271 | | ▲3.04 |
| INC hold | | Swing | | |

=== Assembly election 1957 ===
1957 Madras State Legislative Assembly election : Basin Bridge
| Party | Candidate | Votes | % | ±% |
|---|---|---|---|---|
| INC | T. N. Anandanayaki | 20,441 | 56.41% | New |
| Independent | N. V. Natarajan | 14,367 | 39.65% | New |
| Independent | R. Ramanathan | 866 | 2.39% | New |
| Independent | Pachaiyappan | 564 | 1.56% | New |
| Margin of victory | | 6,074 | 16.76% | |
| Turnout | | 36,238 | 42.30% | |
| Total valid votes | | 36,238 | | |
| Registered electors | | 85,667 | | |
| INC win (new seat) | | | | |
