= P. Appavoo =

Indian politician

Member of the Legislative Assembly, Tamil Nadu
- In office 1957–1962
- Constituency: Kunnathur

Member of the Legislative Assembly, Tamil Nadu
- In office 1962–1967
- Succeeded by: M. Gopal
- Constituency: Kunnathur

Personal details
- Born: 1 September 1927
- Party: Indian National Congress
- Profession: Farmer

P. Appavoo was an Indian politician and a former Member of the Legislative Assembly (MLA) of Tamil Nadu. He hailed from the Chennakuppam area of Sriperumbudur in the Kanchipuram district. He completed his schooling at St. Joseph's School in Chengalpattu. Representing the Indian National Congress party, he contested and won the Tamil Nadu Legislative Assembly elections from the Kunnathur constituency in 1957 and 1962 to become a Member of the Legislative Assembly.

== Electoral Performance ==
=== 1962 ===
1962 Madras Legislative Assembly election: Kunnathur
Party	Candidate	Votes	%	±%
INC	P. Appavoo	20,207	41.61%	
RPI	A. Ratnam	19,422	40.00%	
We Tamils	Durai Elumalai	8,931	18.39%	
Margin of victory		785	1.62%	
Turnout		48,560	60.18%	
Registered electors		85,427		
INC win (new seat)				
