= P. Haribaskar =

Indian politician

Member of the Tamil Nadu Legislative Assembly
- Incumbent
- Assumed office 11 May 2026
- Preceded by: A. G. Venkatachalam
- Constituency: Anthiyur

Personal details
- Party: All India Anna Dravida Munnetra Kazhagam
- Parent: Prakash (father)
- Occupation: Politician, Agriculture

Prakash Haribaskar is an Indian politician who is a Member of the 17th Legislative Assembly of Tamil Nadu. He was elected from Anthiyur as an AIADMK candidate in 2026.

== Electoral performance ==
Election	Constituency	Political party	Result	Vote %	Opposition			Ref
Election	Constituency	Political party	Result	Vote %	Candidate	Political party	Vote %	Ref
2026	Anthiyur	AIADMK	Won	32.32%	Sivabalan. M	DMK	31.64%	-
