= Kunnathur, Tamil Nadu Assembly constituency =

Coordinates: 11.27°N 77.41°E

Kunnathur
- Former constituency for the Tamil Nadu Legislative Assembly

Constituency details
- Country: India
- Region: South India
- State: Tamil Nadu
- District: Kanchipuram
- Established: 1962
- Abolished: 1971
- Total electors: 1,09,509
- Reservation: None

Kunnathur former state assembly constituency in Kanchipuram district, Tamil Nadu, India. It existed from 1962 to 1971.

== Members of the Legislative Assembly ==
| Year | Winner | Party |
|---|---|---|
| 1971 | M. Gopal | Dravida Munnetra Kazhagam |
| 1967 | M. Gopal | Dravida Munnetra Kazhagam |
| 1962 | P. Appavoo | Indian National Congress |

== Election results ==
Vote share of winning candidates
| 1971 | 64.48% |
| 1967 | 68.88% |
| 1962 | 41.61% |

=== 1971 ===
1971 Tamil Nadu Legislative Assembly election: Kunnathur
| Party | Candidate | Votes | % | ±% |
|---|---|---|---|---|
| DMK | M. Gopal | 47,126 | 64.48% | −4.40% |
| INC | P. Appavoo | 24,488 | 33.50% | 3.86% |
| Independent | G. Dayalan | 1,477 | 2.02% | |
| Margin of victory | | 22,638 | 30.97% | −8.26% |
| Turnout | | 73,091 | 69.20% | −7.59% |
| Registered electors | | 1,09,509 | | |
| DMK hold | | Swing | -4.40% | |

=== 1967 ===
1967 Madras Legislative Assembly election: Kunnathur
| Party | Candidate | Votes | % | ±% |
|---|---|---|---|---|
| DMK | M. Gopal | 47,772 | 68.88% | |
| INC | P. Appavoo | 20,563 | 29.65% | −11.97% |
| Independent | B. A. Moorthy | 1,024 | 1.48% | |
| Margin of victory | | 27,209 | 39.23% | 37.61% |
| Turnout | | 69,359 | 76.79% | 16.60% |
| Registered electors | | 92,716 | | |
| DMK gain from INC | | Swing | 27.26% | |

=== 1962 ===
1962 Madras Legislative Assembly election: Kunnathur
| Party | Candidate | Votes | % | ±% |
|---|---|---|---|---|
| INC | P. Appavoo | 20,207 | 41.61% | |
| RPI | A. Ratnam | 19,422 | 40.00% | |
| We Tamils | Durai Elumalai | 8,931 | 18.39% | |
| Margin of victory | | 785 | 1.62% | |
| Turnout | | 48,560 | 60.18% | |
| Registered electors | | 85,427 | | |
| INC win (new seat) | | | | |
