= Tanippadi Assembly constituency =

Coordinates: 12.11°N 78.83°E

Tanippadi
- Former constituency for the Tamil Nadu Legislative Assembly

Constituency details
- Country: India
- Region: South India
- State: Tamil Nadu
- District: Tiruvannamalai
- Established: 1962
- Abolished: 1967
- Total electors: 1,00,133
- Reservation: None

Tanippadi was one of the 234 constituencies in the Tamil Nadu Legislative Assembly of Tamil Nadu, a southern state of India. It was in Tiruvannamalai district.

== Members of the Legislative Assembly ==
Year	Winner	Party
Madras State
1962	A. Arumugam	Indian National Congress

== Election results ==
Vote share of winning candidates
1962	56.26%

=== 1962 ===
1962 Madras Legislative Assembly election: Tanippadi
Party	Candidate	Votes	%	±%
INC	A. Arumugam	33,129	56.26%	
DMK	P. S. Santhanam	25,753	43.74%	
Margin of victory		7,376	12.53%	
Turnout		58,882	62.31%	
Registered electors		1,00,133		
INC win (new seat)				
