= Thurinjapuram Assembly constituency =

Coordinates: 12.32°N 79.10°E

Thurinjapuram
- Former constituency for the Tamil Nadu Legislative Assembly

Constituency details
- Country: India
- Region: South India
- State: Tamil Nadu
- District: Tiruvannamalai
- Established: 1962
- Abolished: 1967
- Reservation: None

Thurinjapuram was one of the 234 constituencies in the Tamil Nadu Legislative Assembly of Tamil Nadu, a southern state of India. It was in Tiruvannamalai district.

== Members of the Legislative Assembly ==
Year	Winner	Party
1957	M. A. Manickavelu	Indian National Congress
1962	Murugaiyan	Dravida Munnetra Kazhagam

== Election results ==
Vote share of winning candidates
1962	43.18%

=== 1962 ===
1962 Madras Legislative Assembly election: Thurinjapuram
Party	Candidate	Votes	%	±%
DMK	Murugaiyan	21,163	43.18%	
INC	Nataraja Mudaliar	13,865	28.29%	
Independent	S. M. Anamalai	8,979	18.32%	
SWA	Chandranathan Kandar	1,551	3.16%	
Independent	C. Govinda Naidu	1,259	2.57%	
Independent	Perianayagam	937	1.91%	
Independent	Narayanasami	795	1.62%	
Independent	D. Chinthamani Mudali	464	0.95%	
Margin of victory		7,298	14.89%	
Turnout		49,013	59.69%	
Registered electors		87,936		
DMK win (new seat)				
