= Vazhapadi Assembly constituency =

1962 Madras Assembly Election, Vazhapadi constitution

Coordinates: 11.66°N 78.40°E

Vazhapadi
- Former constituency for the Tamil Nadu Legislative Assembly

Constituency details
- Country: India
- Region: South India
- State: Tamil Nadu
- District: Salem
- Established: 1951
- Abolished: 1967
- Reservation: None

Vazhapadi is a former state assembly constituency in Salem district, Tamil Nadu, India. It existed from the 1951 delimitation to 1967.

== Members of the Legislative Assembly ==
Year	Winner	Party
1962	Ramasamy Udayar	Indian National Congress
1952	P. Kandasamy Gounder	Independent politician

== Election results ==
Vote share of winning candidates
1962	55.51%
1952	45.43%

=== 1962 ===
1962 Madras Legislative Assembly election: Vazhapadi
Party	Candidate	Votes	%	±%
INC	Ramasamy Udayar	31,154	55.51%	
DMK	Ponnumalai	23,259	41.44%	
Independent	Kuppusamy	1,202	2.14%	
Independent	Vyamalai	506	0.90%	
Margin of victory		7,895	14.07%	
Turnout		56,121	73.37%	
Registered electors		79,148		
INC win (new seat)				

=== 1952 ===
1952 Madras Legislative Assembly election: Vazhapadi
Party	Candidate	Votes	%	±%
Independent	P. Kandasamy Gounder	16,245	45.43%	
INC	B. A. Rajarathnam	13,290	37.17%	37.17%
Independent	A. Ramaswamy	2,759	7.72%	
Independent	Podujanaupa T. V. Anganna Chettiar	2,293	6.41%	
KMPP	Thiruvenginathan	1,168	3.27%	
Margin of victory		2,955	8.26%	
Turnout		35,755	51.26%	
Registered electors		69,749		
Independent win (new seat)				
