= Sankaravalli =

Indian politician

Sankara Valli is an Indian politician and incumbent Member of the Legislative Assembly of Tamil Nadu. She was elected to the Tamil Nadu legislative assembly as a Dravida Munnetra Kazhagam candidate from Acharapakkam constituency in 2006 election.
