= Saliamangalam Assembly constituency =

Coordinates: 10.78°N 79.28°E

Saliamangalam
- Former constituency for the Tamil Nadu Legislative Assembly

Constituency details
- Country: India
- Region: South India
- State: Tamil Nadu
- District: Thanjavur
- Established: 1962
- Abolished: 1967
- Reservation: None

Saliamangalam was one of the 234 constituencies in the Tamil Nadu Legislative Assembly of Tamil Nadu, a southern state of India. It was in Thanjavur district.

== Members of the Legislative Assembly ==
| Year | Winner | Party |
|---|---|---|
| 1962 | A. Appavoo Thevar | Indian National Congress |

== Election results ==
Vote share of winning candidates
| 1962 | 57.01% |

=== 1962 ===
1962 Madras Legislative Assembly election: Saliamangalam
| Party | Candidate | Votes | % | ±% |
|---|---|---|---|---|
| INC | A. Appavoo Thevar | 36,259 | 57.01% | |
| IUML | Addul Samad | 11,527 | 18.12% | |
| SWA | O. M. Samiaiyah Posum Badiar | 10,483 | 16.48% | |
| Tamilnad Socialist Labour Party | Murugesan | 3,362 | 5.29% | |
| Independent | P. Krishnasamy | 1,974 | 3.10% | |
| Margin of victory | | 24,732 | 38.88% | |
| Turnout | | 63,605 | 72.20% | |
| Registered electors | | 92,945 | | |
| INC win (new seat) | | | | |
