= Kanchi Manimozhiar =

Kanchi Manimozhiyar
- Born: 9 May 1900; Kancheepuram, Madras Presidency, British India (Now Tamil Nadu, India)
- Died: 7 June 1972 (aged 72); Madras (now Chennai), Tamilnadu, India
- Other name: Manikavasagam
- Occupations: Social activist, Publisher, Politician, Social reformer
- Political party: Dravida Munnetra Kazhagam
- Movement: Social Justice, Self-respect
- Spouse: Abhirami Ammaiyyal
- Awards: Suyamariyathai Semmal

Kanchi Manimozhiyar (9 May 1900 – 7 June 1972) - was a Tamil scholar, publisher, politician and social worker. He was the publisher and editor of the magazine Por Vaal, which had Dravidian movement views. He received many titles such as "Suyamariyathai Semmal".

== Life ==
Kanchi Manimozhiyar was born on 9 May 1900 in Kancheepuram, the capital of the Thondai Nadu, as the last son of the Tamil poet and textile merchant Perunagar Chengalvaraya Mudaliar. He studied at Kancheepuram Pachaiyappan School. His wife was Abhirami Ammaiyar. His eldest son is Professor M. Ilancheliyan, his younger son M. Natarajan, a building contractor and his daughter M. Tamil Selvi, who worked as a high school teacher. N. Ilavarasu is his grandson, and N. Kalaichelvi, N. Thenmozhi, N. Vasanthi are his granddaughters. He belongs to the Senguntha Kaikola Mudaliar community. He contested the 1962 Legislative assembly elections from the Thiagaraya Nagar assembly constituency on behalf of the DMK and was elected as a member of the Tamil Nadu Legislative Assembly.

== Publisher, editor ==
Kanchi Manimozhiyar started the weekly magazine Porvaal on August 16, 1947, and also served as its associate editor. Porvaal magazine was published in Tamilnadu for seven years from August 16, 1947, to August 8, 1954, and after a short break, published from January 5, 1957, to May 3, 1958, for almost nine years. "Our ambition is to tell the truth without cover up. No matter how disgusting it may be to someone, we do not care about it. We know only one direct way to speak the truth in our hearts. That one is enough. We have embarked on the serious work of taking Tamil Nadu on the path to a new world." These sentences were found in the editorial of the first issue of that magazine. From 1947 to 1949, Porvaal has worked well for the development of the Dravidar Kazhagam (DK) and for the development of the Dravida Munnetra Kazhagam (DMK), which was founded in 1949. In 1948, it provided excellent writings and illustrations to promote the anti-Hindi movement. It changed the situation where only newspapers run by a particular community could publish special edition on occasions. Porvaal published many special issues in a grand manner. Some of them are: Periyar's birthday special issue (September 1947), Pongal festival edition (1948, 1951, 1958), DMK first anniversary special issue (1950), "Parasakthi" Tamil movie victory issue (December 1952), Kalaivanar N. S. Krishnan memorial special issue (September 1957) etc. were very well received by the people.

He had a keen interest in publishing a newspaper since his youth, and had gained expertise and experience in it. During the years 1924–1927, while working as a teacher at Wallaja Bath, he was the editor of the Monday magazine "Bharatham" published by the Kancheepuram United Press and ran it effectively. From 1929, Manimozhiyar was the assistant editor of the monthly magazine "Senguntha Mithran" and from 1934, functioned as its Editor for fifteen years. Manimozhiyar has the honor and distinction of running the weekly magazine "Navayugam" with Arignar Anna as its editor in 1937. It was that magazine which first gave Arignar Anna the opportunity to realize that he was also a talented writer.

While publishing the daily magazine "Porvaal" in a manner that was admired by all Tamil Nadu itself he also established a book publishing company called "Pakutharivu Pasarai" and through it published many valuable books that contributed greatly to the progress and well-being of the Tamil people. Some of the books published in "Pakutharivu Basarai" are - "Vakuppurimai Porattam" written by Professor K. Anbazhagan, "Manaphuyal", "Ilavarasi", "Thenmozhi", "Puduvellam", "Potshilai" all written by Radhamanalan; "Thamizhan Thodutha Por" "Erottu Pathai", "Arignar Annadurai", Indian Constitution" written by Professor M. Ilanchezhiyan. "Anna Kanda Thiagarayar" written by scholar C.N Annadurai.

Another innovation that Manimozhiyar made as a publisher was to publish a diary called "Dravidar Natkurippu". Published from 1950 to 1958, the diary was a compilation of the Dravida Munnetra Kazhagam's ideas/projects, addresses of speakers, and information about the DMK. It also served as a storehouse of knowledge, providing the sayings of the great C.N Annadurai and the golden quotes of world scholars, one quote a day.

== Service to Senguntha community ==
During his time, he saw that the Senguntha community was very poor in terms of education and economy and did many charitable works through the South India Senguntha Mahajana Sangam. While he was the secretary of the Sangam, he created an organization called the Senguntha Education Fund. A stipend was provided to students pursuing graduate studies. From 1928 to 1938, he visited villages across the country where the Senguntha community lived and helped the Sangam grow. He encouraged the children of the Senguntha community to attend school and study. In 1932, he raised the flag and addressed the Sri Lanka Senguntha Conference held in Jaffna. Then traveled around Sri Lanka for two months and spoke in many meetings. He took great efforts to build a hostel for the students of the Senguntha community to stay and study. The vacant plot at No. 35, Arrington Road, Sethupat, Chennai, was purchased by the South India Senguntha Mahajana Sangam from Dravida Munnetra Kazhagam from its president, Peraringar Anna. The person who helped in this was Kanchi Manimozhiyar. Manimozhiyar contributed to the prosperity and excellence of the monthly publication "Senguntha Mithran" from 24–2–1929. He served as its editor from 1934 to 1941. Although "Senguntha Mithran" was published only for a specific community, it became famous as a traditional Tamil magazine that could be read and enjoyed by Tamil people regardless of caste.

== Anti-Hindi protest ==
In 1938, an order was issued to make Hindi a compulsory subject in Tamil Nadu. Protests broke out all over Tamil Nadu against this. Manimozhiyar organized the first anti-Hindi procession in Chennai. He organized hundreds of anti-Hindi meetings around Chennai and gave lectures in them, helping this movement grow. When many printing press owners were afraid to print reports and books about the anti-Hindi struggle due to government repression, Manimozhiyar himself printed them in his own printing house. Manimozhiyar printed 10,000 copies of "Tamil Thai Pulambal" composed by Swami Arunagirinathar and "An Open Letter to C. Rajagopalachari" written by novelist Somasundara Bharathiyar at his own expense and quickly sent them to different places in Tamil nadu. On 3-6-38 a Hindi abolition conference was held in Kodambakkam, Chennai under the leadership of Maraimalai Adikalar. On that day, Palladam Ponnusamy, who was on a hunger strike in front of the Chief Minister's house, was arrested. On learning of this, the conference turned into a procession and reached the Chief Minister's house with the slogan "Long live Tamil, Hindi should go". In that day's meeting, S. T. Nayakam, Kanchi Manimozhiyar, and Sami Shanmuganandam spoke for three hours. On 22-8-1948 and 7–9–48, Manimozhiar was arrested along with the leaders of the organization and sentenced to a week in prison.

== Politician ==
In 1917, he was impressed by the reception given to Sir P. Thyagarayar in Kanchi, and after learning about Thyagarayar's principles, he became actively involved in the great work of spreading them. At the age of 17 (in 1917), he started Sir P. Thyagarayar reading room and a non-Brahmin youth association, which he kept functional and worked as its secretary until 1930. He first served the Justice Party and then the Dravidian Party led by Thanthai Periyar. Manimozhiyar, was one of the founders of the Dravida Munnetra Kazhagam. He worked tirelessly from the day the organization was founded until his death to ensure that the party's influence and fame spread throughout Tamil Nadu. He served as the finance committee secretary of the party for three years from 1949, and was a great support to party leader Arignar Anna. The DMK did not field its candidates in the 1952 general elections. But it supported and promoted independent candidates who were in line with its policies. Manimozhiyar worked tirelessly for such candidates in and around Chennai. In 1957, when Aringar Anna was contesting in the Kanchipuram constituency, Manimozhiyar stayed in Kanchipuram for several days and did door to door campaign for Anna.

In the 1962 general election, Kanchi Manimozhiyar contested as a candidate of the Dravida Munnetra Kazhagam from T-Nagar constituency, which was the largest among all the Tamil Nadu legislative constituencies, and won by a margin of about 9000 votes. Manimozhiar regularly attended each and every legislative session and actively took part in the debates held there. The need for the government to improve the living standards of primary school teachers, the need to eliminate the hardships and miseries plaguing the lives of handloom weavers, the need for the state government to pay full attention to arrangements to alleviate the water shortage in Chennai city, and suggestions for the livelihood of slum dwellers were among his legislative speeches. He worked tirelessly for the people of Thyagaraya Nagar constituency and earned the full support of the people. During the 1967 general elections, he wholeheartedly gave up the constituency for Kalaignar Karunanidhi. When Arignar Anna called Manimozhiyar and told him that for some reason, Kalaignar Karunanidhi had to be fielded as the DMK candidate for the Saidapet constituency and that Manimozhiyar should kindly give him the assembly seat that was his to Kalaignar Karunanidhi. Manimozhiyar immediately gave his consent without hesitation, even though he knows that he had the full support of the people of the constituency and could easily win again in the next elections. In 1969, he was appointed as one of the Deputy General Secretaries of the DMK Central Committee and carried out his responsibilities as a leader efficiently until his last days.

Manimozhiyar was imprisoned six times. He was imprisoned for leading and participating in the anti-Hindi protests of 1948 and 1965, for organizing black flag displays in protest against the policies of the central government in 1951 and 1958 and for the protests highlighting the price hikes in 1962.

== Tamil language / social service ==
He spent his time and effort in numerous public welfare works while serving in the Sengundar Movement, Justice Party, Self-Esteem Movement, Dravida Kazhagam, Dravida Munnetra Kazhagam. Realizing the need for primary education, Manimozhiyar in 1921 started a primary school called Kalaimagal Primary School at his own expense in Karukkinil amarnthaval Koil Street, Kanchipuram and ran it effectively for 9 years. In 1930, he took the post of public policy secretary for the Sengunthar Sangam. So, he merged the primary school run by him with the municipal school. In April 1935, Manimozhiar along with the great efforts of the Executive President of the Saivasithananda Nalapathippu Kazhagam, V. Subaiya Pillai, Tamil scholars K. Namasivaya Mudaliar as the President, and Mr. V. K., Reverend Papli, and S. Sachithanandam Pillai B.A. L. D as vice-presidents, started an organization called Thiruvalluvar Thirunal Kazhagam. Through this group, they would explain the importance of Thirukkural to the people and every year celebrate Thiruvalluvar Thirunal.

== Social reformer ==
Manimozhiyar has active in the self-respect movement. He was against rituals that indicated hierarchy in society and conducted many self-respect marriages without any traditional chants or rituals.

Tamil Wikipedia page:
