= P. Selvarasu =

Indian politician

P. Selvarasu is an Indian politician and former Member of the Legislative Assembly of Tamil Nadu. He was elected to the Tamil Nadu legislative assembly as a Dravida Munnetra Kazhagam candidate from Anthiyur constituency in 1996 election and served as Adi Dravidar Welfare Minister during 1996-2001. He was elected as Member of Rajyasabha in 2020.

== Electoral performance ==
Election	Constituency	Political party	Result	Vote %	Opposition			Ref
Election	Constituency	Political party	Result	Vote %	Candidate	Political party	Vote %	Ref
1996	Anthiyur	DMK	Won	52.97%	M. Subramaniam	AIADMK	27.77%	
2001	Anthiyur	DMK	Lost	36.00%	R. Krishnan	PMK	54.38%	
