= T. N. Anandanayaki =

Indian politician

T. N. Ananthanayaki

Member of Madras Legislative Assembly
- In office 1971 - 1977
- Constituency: Mylapore

Personal details
- Born: 18 June 1931
- Died: 4 April 2001 (aged 69) Chennai
- Party: Indian National Congress (Organisation)
- Education: Lawyer
- Alma mater: Madras Law College
- Occupation: Politician

T. N. Anandanayaki (1931-2001) was an Indian politician and former Member of the Legislative Assembly of Tamil Nadu.She also served as the president of the Tamil Nadu Congress Committee. She was elected to the Tamil Nadu legislative assembly as an Indian National Congress candidate from Basin Bridge (State Assembly Constituency)(Two Times) and Mylapore (State Assembly Constituency)

== Early life ==
Born in 1931; Educated at Nehru Board High School Papanasam, Presidency college and Madras law college. She was a member of Indian National Congress Party (INCP) from 1946.

== Electoral performance ==
Election	Constituency	Political party	Result	Vote %	Opposition			Ref
Election	Constituency	Political party	Result	Vote %	Candidate	Political party	Vote %	Ref
1957	Basin Bridge	INC	Won	56.41%	N. V. Natarajan	Independent	39.65%	
1962	Basin Bridge	INC	Won	50.63%	N. V. Natarajan	DMK	41.68%	
1971	Mylapore	INC	Won	55.01%	M. P. Sivagnanam	DMK	44.99%	
