= V. Periasamy =

Indian politician

V. Periasamy is an Indian politician and a former Member of the Tamil Nadu Legislative Assembly. He was elected to the assembly as an Anna Dravida Munnetra Kazhagam (Jayalalitha) candidate from the Anthiyur constituency in the 1989 election and as an Anna Dravida Munnetra Kazhagam candidate in the 1991 election.

== Electoral performance ==
Election	Constituency	Political party	Result	Vote %	Opposition			Ref
Election	Constituency	Political party	Result	Vote %	Candidate	Political party	Vote %	Ref
1989	Anthiyur	AIADMK	Won	37.31%	K. Ramasamy	DMK	34.57%	
1991	Anthiyur	AIADMK	Won	59.68%	Era. Dha. Rukmani	DMK	24.43%	
