= E. Ramakrishnan =

Indian politician

Dr. E. Ramakrishnan (born December 12, 1948) is an Indian politician and Doctor. He is a former Member of the Legislative Assembly of Tamil Nadu. He was elected to the Tamil Nadu legislative assembly as a Dravida Munnetra Kazhagam candidate from Acharapakkam constituency in 1989 election and as an Anna Dravida Munnetra Kazhagam candidate 1991 election.
