= V. Balasundaram =

Indian politician (died 2019)

V. Balasundaram (1941/1942 – 7 December 2019) was an Indian politician who served as Member of the Legislative Assembly of Tamil Nadu. He was Mayor of Chennai for the year 1969–70, and was elected to the Tamil Nadu legislative assembly as a Dravida Munnetra Kazhagam candidate from Acharapakkam constituency in 1971 election.

He was later described as a "veteran Dalit leader", and became President of the Ambedkar Makkal Iyakkam (Ambedkar People's movement), a political movement in Tamil Nadu working for the upliftment of Dalits.
