= Anthiyur Assembly constituency =

State Legislative Assembly Constituency in Tamil Nadu

Coordinates: 11.58°N 77.60°E

Anthiyur
- Constituency No. 105 for the Tamil Nadu Legislative Assembly

Constituency details
- Country: India
- Region: South India
- State: Tamil Nadu
- District: Erode
- Lok Sabha constituency: Tiruppur
- Established: 1962
- Total electors: 2,07,413
- Reservation: None

Member of Legislative Assembly
- 17th Tamil Nadu Legislative Assembly
- Incumbent P. Haribaskar
- Party: AIADMK
- Alliance: NDA
- Elected year: 2026

Anthiyur is a legislative assembly, that includes the town of Anthiyur and other neighbouring local bodies. Its State Assembly Constituency number is 105. It is a part of Tiruppur Lok Sabha constituency. The constituency is in existence since 1962 election. Anthiyur was a part of Gobichettipalayam Lok Sabha constituency until 2009 election. It is one of the 234 State Legislative Assembly Constituencies in Tamil Nadu.

== Demographics ==
Kongu Vellalar Gounder, Vanniyar Uppuliyr Arunththathiyar, Senguntha Mudaliar, Devanga Chettiyar, Muslims and Adi Dravida communities are populated in this constituency.

== Members of the Legislative Assembly ==
Election	Member	Party
1962	Perumalraju	Indian National Congress
1967	E. M. Natarajan	Dravida Munnetra Kazhagam
1971	E. M. Natarajan	Dravida Munnetra Kazhagam
1977	P. Guruswamy	All India Anna Dravida Munnetra Kazhagam
1980	P. Guruswamy	All India Anna Dravida Munnetra Kazhagam
1984	U. P. Mathaiyan	All India Anna Dravida Munnetra Kazhagam
1989	V. Periasamy	All India Anna Dravida Munnetra Kazhagam
1991	V. Periasamy	All India Anna Dravida Munnetra Kazhagam
1996	P. Selvarasu	Dravida Munnetra Kazhagam
2001	R. Krishnan	Pattali Makkal Katchi
2006	S. Gurusamy	Dravida Munnetra Kazhagam
2011	S. S. Ramanitharan	All India Anna Dravida Munnetra Kazhagam
2016	E. M. R. Raja	All India Anna Dravida Munnetra Kazhagam
2021	A. G. Venkatachalam	Dravida Munnetra Kazhagam
2026	P. Haribaskar	All India Anna Dravida Munnetra Kazhagam

Madras State
- Note: From 1967 to 1971, Andhiyur was not listed as a (SC) constituency.

== Election results ==
=== Assembly election 2026 ===
2026 Tamil Nadu Legislative Assembly election : Anthiyur
Party	Candidate	Votes	%	±%
AIADMK	P. Haribaskar	60,042	32.32%	New
DMK	Sivabalan. M	58,782	31.64%	▼13.47
TVK	Vijay Venkatesh. M	56,372	30.34%	New
NTK	Aalangattur Anandhi	5,287	2.85%	▼1.84
NOTA	None of the above	754	0.41%	▼0.18
Margin of victory		1,260	0.68%	▼0.05
Turnout		185,970	89.66%	▲9.20
Total valid votes		185,775		
Registered electors		207,413		▼5.56
AIADMK gain from DMK		Swing	▼12.79	

=== Assembly election 2021 ===
2021 Tamil Nadu Legislative Assembly election : Anthiyur
Party	Candidate	Votes	%	±%
DMK	A. G. Venkatachalam	79,096	45.11%	▲6.04
AIADMK	K. S. Shanmugavel	77,821	44.38%	▲2.17
NTK	M. Saravanan	8,230	4.69%	▲4.04
MNM	M. Gurunathan	2,474	1.41%	New
Ahimsa Socialist Party	A. Prathaban	2,045	1.17%	New
AMMK	S. R. Selvam	1,212	0.69%	New
NOTA	None of the above	1,027	0.59%	▼0.32
Margin of victory		1,275	0.73%	▼2.40
Turnout		176,702	80.46%	▼1.23
Total valid votes		175,358		
Rejected ballots		317	0.18%	▲0.15
Registered electors		219,615		▲5.77
DMK gain from AIADMK		Swing	▲2.90	

=== Assembly election 2016 ===
2016 Tamil Nadu Legislative Assembly election : Anthiyur
Party	Candidate	Votes	%	±%
AIADMK	E. M. R. Raja Alias K. R. Rajakrishnan	71,575	42.21%	▼12.71
DMK	A. G. Venkatachalam	66,263	39.07%	▲1.82
PMK	S. C. R. Gopal	11,570	6.82%	New
KMDK	D. Raja	5,995	3.54%	New
DMDK	M. K. Raja Sampath	5,828	3.44%	New
BJP	P. G. Mohankumar	1,962	1.16%	▼0.23
NOTA	None of the above	1,546	0.91%	New
NTK	K. Manimekalai	1,101	0.65%	New
Margin of victory		5,312	3.13%	▼14.54
Turnout		169,628	81.69%	▼0.65
Total valid votes		169,581		
Rejected ballots		47	0.03%	▼0.03
Registered electors		207,641		▲19.55
AIADMK hold		Swing		

=== Assembly election 2011 ===
2011 Tamil Nadu Legislative Assembly election : Anthiyur
Party	Candidate	Votes	%	±%
AIADMK	S. S. Ramanitharan	78,496	54.92%	▲21.38
DMK	N. K. K. P. Raaja	53,242	37.25%	▼14.05
Independent	K. Pongiyia Gounder	2,269	1.59%	
BJP	A. P. S. Bargunan	1,988	1.39%	▲0.09
Independent	A. M. Sheikdavood	1,528	1.07%	
Ulzaipali Makkal Katchy	A. Velumani	1,493	1.04%	New
BSP	A. Paramasivan	1,132	0.79%	New
Margin of victory		25,254	17.67%	▼0.08
Turnout		143,004	82.34%	▲12.80
Total valid votes		142,922		
Rejected ballots		82	0.06%	▲0.06
Registered electors		173,681		▲8.61
AIADMK gain from DMK		Swing	▲3.62	

=== Assembly election 2006 ===
2006 Tamil Nadu Legislative Assembly election : Anthiyur
Party	Candidate	Votes	%	±%
DMK	S. Gurusamy	57,043	51.30%	▲15.30
AIADMK	M. Subramaniam	37,300	33.54%	New
DMDK	P. Jagadeeswaran	11,574	10.41%	New
Independent	P. Raju	1,763	1.59%	
BJP	V. Palanisamy	1,446	1.30%	New
Independent	P. Mannathan	784	0.71%	
Independent	P. Gurusamy	709	0.64%	
Margin of victory		19,743	17.75%	▼0.63
Turnout		111,199	69.54%	▲12.88
Total valid votes		111,198		
Registered electors		159,908		▼7.80
DMK gain from PMK		Swing	▼3.08	

=== Assembly election 2001 ===
2001 Tamil Nadu Legislative Assembly election : Anthiyur
Party	Candidate	Votes	%	±%
PMK	R. Krishnan	53,436	54.38%	▲40.34
DMK	P. Selvarasu	35,374	36.00%	▼16.97
MDMK	M. D. Thangavel	3,808	3.88%	▼0.03
Independent	M. Raja	2,167	2.21%	
Independent	Sellammal	1,556	1.58%	
Independent	G. Ponnusamy	1,083	1.10%	
Margin of victory		18,062	18.38%	▼6.82
Turnout		98,269	56.66%	▼9.99
Total valid votes		98,269		
Registered electors		173,432		▲12.87
PMK gain from DMK		Swing	▲1.41	

=== Assembly election 1996 ===
1996 Tamil Nadu Legislative Assembly election : Anthiyur
Party	Candidate	Votes	%	±%
DMK	P. Selvarasu	52,535	52.97%	▲28.54
AIADMK	M. Subramaniam	27,541	27.77%	New
PMK	Sivakami	13,924	14.04%	▼0.92
MDMK	Era. Dha. Rukmani	3,874	3.91%	New
Margin of victory		24,994	25.20%	▼10.05
Turnout		102,416	66.65%	▲3.79
Total valid votes		99,181		
Rejected ballots		3,352	3.27%	▲0.30
Registered electors		153,654		▲6.35
DMK gain from AIADMK		Swing	▼6.71	

=== Assembly election 1991 ===
1991 Tamil Nadu Legislative Assembly election : Anthiyur
Party	Candidate	Votes	%	±%
AIADMK	V. Periasamy	52,592	59.68%	New
DMK	Era. Dha. Rukmani	21,530	24.43%	▼10.14
PMK	S. Selvaraj	13,179	14.96%	New
Margin of victory		31,062	35.25%	▲32.51
Turnout		90,814	62.86%	▲7.32
Total valid votes		88,116		
Rejected ballots		2,698	2.97%	▲0.47
Registered electors		144,480		▲9.32
AIADMK gain from AIADMK		Swing	▲22.37	

=== Assembly election 1989 ===
1989 Tamil Nadu Legislative Assembly election : Anthiyur
Party	Candidate	Votes	%	±%
AIADMK	V. Periasamy	26,702	37.31%	New
DMK	K. Ramasamy	24,740	34.57%	▲5.44
INC	V. Chidambaram	8,199	11.46%	New
AIADMK	U. P. Mathaiyam	8,071	11.28%	New
India Farmers and Tailers Party	R. Ganesan	746	1.04%	New
Independent	D. Madesh	701	0.98%	
Independent	P. Guruswamy	606	0.85%	
Independent	S. Subramanian	523	0.73%	
Margin of victory		1,962	2.74%	▼37.88
Turnout		73,411	55.54%	▼14.73
Total valid votes		71,574		
Rejected ballots		1,837	2.50%	▼1.44
Registered electors		132,166		▲15.61
AIADMK gain from AIADMK		Swing	▼32.44	

=== Assembly election 1984 ===
1984 Tamil Nadu Legislative Assembly election : Anthiyur
Party	Candidate	Votes	%	±%
AIADMK	U. P. Mathaiyan	53,825	69.75%	▲12.69
DMK	S. Lakshmi	22,479	29.13%	▼5.04
Independent	T. Sivalingam	863	1.12%	
Margin of victory		31,346	40.62%	▲17.74
Turnout		80,329	70.27%	▲13.61
Total valid votes		77,167		
Rejected ballots		3,162	3.94%	▲2.15
Registered electors		114,321		▲5.21
AIADMK hold		Swing		

=== Assembly election 1980 ===
1980 Tamil Nadu Legislative Assembly election : Anthiyur
Party	Candidate	Votes	%	±%
AIADMK	P. Guruswamy	34,498	57.06%	New
DMK	T. G. Vadivel	20,662	34.17%	▲16.27
JP	M. Karuppan	4,588	7.59%	New
Independent	T. P. Muthusamy	714	1.18%	
Margin of victory		13,836	22.88%	▲0.67
Turnout		61,565	56.66%	▲0.06
Total valid votes		60,462		
Rejected ballots		1,103	1.79%	▼0.03
Registered electors		108,662		▲7.04
AIADMK gain from AIADMK		Swing	▲14.60	

=== Assembly election 1977 ===
1977 Tamil Nadu Legislative Assembly election : Anthiyur
Party	Candidate	Votes	%	±%
AIADMK	P. Guruswamy	23,950	42.46%	New
JP	A. Palani	11,423	20.25%	New
DMK	V. P. Palaniammal	10,099	17.90%	▼38.89
INC	K. C. Raju	9,080	16.10%	New
Independent	T. Sivalingam	1,283	2.27%	
Independent	A. K. Aran	388	0.69%	
Margin of victory		12,527	22.21%	▲8.63
Turnout		57,454	56.60%	▼6.40
Total valid votes		56,406		
Rejected ballots		1,048	1.82%	▲1.82
Registered electors		101,515		▲8.06
AIADMK gain from DMK		Swing	▼14.33	

=== Assembly election 1971 ===
1971 Tamil Nadu Legislative Assembly election : Anthiyur
Party	Candidate	Votes	%	±%
DMK	E. M. Natarajan	32,691	56.79%	▲0.80
INC	K. S. Nanjappan	24,876	43.21%	New
Margin of victory		7,815	13.58%	▲1.59
Turnout		59,182	63.00%	▼10.27
Total valid votes		57,567		
Registered electors		93,941		▲6.27
DMK hold		Swing		

=== Assembly election 1967 ===
1967 Madras State Legislative Assembly election : Anthiyur
Party	Candidate	Votes	%	±%
DMK	E. M. Natarajan	34,877	55.99%	▲26.20
INC	Gurumurthi	27,409	44.01%	▼12.00
Margin of victory		7,468	11.99%	▼14.23
Turnout		64,768	73.27%	▲24.72
Total valid votes		62,286		
Registered electors		88,402		▼0.29
DMK gain from INC		Swing	▼0.02	

=== Assembly election 1962 ===
1962 Madras State Legislative Assembly election : Anthiyur
Party	Candidate	Votes	%	±%
INC	Perumalraju	22,533	56.01%	New
DMK	Kalimuthu	11,984	29.79%	New
Independent	Thavasi	4,272	10.62%	New
Independent	Karuppan	1,444	3.59%	New
Margin of victory		10,549	26.22%	
Turnout		43,046	48.55%	
Total valid votes		40,233		
Registered electors		88,662		
INC win (new seat)				
