= S. Gurusamy =

Indian politician

S. Gurusamy (born 4 June 1952), also known as S. S. Gurusaamy, is an Indian politician who was elected to the Tamil Nadu Legislative Assembly in the 2006 election. A member of the Dravida Munnetra Kazhagam, he represented the Anthiyur constituency.

== Biography ==
S. Gurusamy was born on 4 June 1952 in Sankarappalayam in Tamil Nadu. Prior to his election, he had been associated with the Telecommunication Staff Development Association for 30 years. He is married and has one child. On 27 April 2008, he changed his name to S. S. Gurusaamy.

In the 2006 election, Gurusamy ran as a Dravida Munnetra Kazhagam for the Tamil Nadu Legislative Assembly, standing in the Anthiyur constituency. He was elected with 57,043 votes, defeating AIADMK candidate M. Subramaniam, who received 37,300 votes.

While in the legislative assembly, Gurusamy was a member of the Committee on Government Assurances from 2006 to 2007, the House Committee from 2007 to 2008, and the Committee on Papers Laid on the Table of the House from 2008 to 2011. During his tenure, he asked 31 questions. He may have been the same S. Gurusamy who was elected in 2006 to a three year term on the board of directors of the Tamil Nadu Agricultural University.

== Electoral performance ==
Election	Constituency	Political party	Result	Vote %	Opposition			Ref
Election	Constituency	Political party	Result	Vote %	Candidate	Political party	Vote %	Ref
2006	Anthiyur	DMK	Won	51.30%	M. Subramaniam	AIADMK	33.54%	
