= Acharapakkam Assembly constituency =

Former constituency of the Tamil Nadu Legislative Assembly

Coordinates: 12.41°N 79.82°E

Acharapakkam
- Former constituency for the Tamil Nadu Legislative Assembly

Constituency details
- Country: India
- Region: South India
- State: Tamil Nadu
- District: Chengalpattu
- Established: 1962
- Abolished: 2008
- Total electors: 146,977
- Reservation: SC

Acharapakkam was a state assembly constituency in Chengalpattu district in the Indian state of Tamil Nadu. It included the town, Acharapakkam. Acharapakkam Assembly constituency (SC) was part of Chengalpattu Lok Sabha constituency which is now defunct.

== Members of the Legislative Assembly ==
Election	Member	Party
1962	Venkatasubba Reddy	Indian National Congress
1967	P. S. Ellappan	Swatantra Party
1971	V. Balasundaram	Dravida Munnetra Kazhagam
1977	K. Ethirajan	All India Anna Dravida Munnetra Kazhagam
1980	C. Ganesan	All India Anna Dravida Munnetra Kazhagam
1984	K. Ethirajan	All India Anna Dravida Munnetra Kazhagam
1989	E. Ramakrishnan	Dravida Munnetra Kazhagam
1991	E. Ramakrishnan	All India Anna Dravida Munnetra Kazhagam
1996	S. Mathivanan	Dravida Munnetra Kazhagam
2001	A. Selvaraj	Pattali Makkal Katchi
2002 By-election	A. Boovaraghamoorthy	All India Anna Dravida Munnetra Kazhagam
2006	Sankara Valli @ Sankari Narayanan	Dravida Munnetra Kazhagam

Madras State

== Election results ==
=== Assembly election 2006 ===
2006 Tamil Nadu Legislative Assembly election : Acharapakkam
Party	Candidate	Votes	%	±%
DMK	Sankara Valli @ Sankari Narayanan	55,116	50.56%	New
AIADMK	M. Saraswathi	39,260	36.02%	▼17.40
DMDK	S. Kantha Gurunathan	10,478	9.61%	New
Independent	R. K. Balasundaram	1,926	1.77%	
BJP	K. M. Shanmugam	1,629	1.49%	New
Margin of victory		15,856	14.55%	▼2.69
Turnout		109,003	74.16%	▲12.03
Total valid votes		109,003		
Registered electors		146,977		▼12.12
DMK gain from AIADMK		Swing	▼2.86	

=== Assembly by-election 2002 ===
Source: The Hindu
The MDMK, did not contest this seat, instead supported the PMK candidate, which also got the support of DMK and BJP.

2002 Tamil Nadu Legislative Assembly by-election : Acharapakkam
Party	Candidate	Votes	%	±%
AIADMK	A. Boovaraghamoorthy	55,507	53.42%	New
PMK	D. Parventhan	37,590	36.18%	▼17.51
CPI	P. S. Ellappan	4,047	3.89%	New
APMK	S. J. Raja	1,928	1.86%	New
Independent	D. Vinoth Khannan	1,558	1.50%	
Independent	S. Ramesh	852	0.82%	
Independent	A. Murugesan	825	0.79%	
Margin of victory		17,917	17.24%	▲1.88
Turnout		103,911	62.13%	▲1.97
Total valid votes		103,911		
Registered electors		167,240		▼0.18
AIADMK gain from PMK		Swing	▼0.27	

=== Assembly election 2001 ===
2001 Tamil Nadu Legislative Assembly election : Acharapakkam
Party	Candidate	Votes	%	±%
PMK	A. Selvaraj	54,114	53.69%	▲45.36
DMK	Dr. T. Murugesan	38,636	38.33%	▼17.82
MDMK	E. Sekar	3,397	3.37%	New
Independent	P. Balaraman	2,153	2.14%	
Independent	M. Kadirvelu	1,943	1.93%	
Margin of victory		15,478	15.36%	▼10.75
Turnout		100,793	60.16%	▼8.93
Total valid votes		100,793		
Registered electors		167,541		▲13.77
PMK gain from DMK		Swing	▼2.46	

=== Assembly election 1996 ===
1996 Tamil Nadu Legislative Assembly election : Acharapakkam
Party	Candidate	Votes	%	±%
DMK	S. Mathivanan	54,558	56.15%	▲26.37
AIADMK	A. Boovaraghamoorthy	29,187	30.04%	New
PMK	E. Adhikesavan	8,098	8.33%	▼3.97
JD	A. V. Nagarajan	2,676	2.75%	New
Independent	M. Kadirvelu	656	0.68%	
Margin of victory		25,371	26.11%	▼0.41
Turnout		101,740	69.09%	▼0.20
Total valid votes		97,170		
Rejected ballots		4,680	4.60%	▲1.70
Registered electors		147,264		▲6.26
DMK gain from AIADMK		Swing	▼0.15	

=== Assembly election 1991 ===
1991 Tamil Nadu Legislative Assembly election : Acharapakkam
Party	Candidate	Votes	%	±%
AIADMK	E. Ramakrishnan	52,494	56.30%	New
DMK	M. Jayapal	27,769	29.78%	▼21.84
PMK	Raghavan Alias Ambedkar Pithan	11,465	12.30%	New
Independent	S. Vinayagam	737	0.79%	
Margin of victory		24,725	26.52%	▼8.94
Turnout		96,025	69.29%	▲4.22
Total valid votes		93,241		
Rejected ballots		2,784	2.90%	▲0.05
Registered electors		138,588		▲11.36
AIADMK gain from DMK		Swing	▲4.68	

=== Assembly election 1989 ===
1989 Tamil Nadu Legislative Assembly election : Acharapakkam
Party	Candidate	Votes	%	±%
DMK	E. Ramakrishnan	40,609	51.62%	▲7.79
AIADMK	P. Singaram	12,716	16.16%	New
INC	V. Ramalingam	10,534	13.39%	New
Independent	Dhanasingh	10,122	12.87%	
Independent	K. Mariappan	2,921	3.71%	
Independent	Goodalore Jayaraj	1,205	1.53%	
Margin of victory		27,893	35.46%	▲24.64
Turnout		80,973	65.07%	▼10.15
Total valid votes		78,664		
Rejected ballots		2,309	2.85%	▼1.06
Registered electors		124,447		▲13.47
DMK gain from AIADMK		Swing	▼3.04	

=== Assembly election 1984 ===
1984 Tamil Nadu Legislative Assembly election : Acharapakkam
Party	Candidate	Votes	%	±%
AIADMK	K. Ethirajan	43,323	54.66%	▲4.58
DMK	E. Ramakrishnan	34,744	43.83%	▼6.09
Independent	S. Sukumaran	1,199	1.51%	
Margin of victory		8,579	10.82%	▲10.65
Turnout		82,494	75.22%	▲5.57
Total valid votes		79,266		
Rejected ballots		3,228	3.91%	▲2.17
Registered electors		109,675		▲6.70
AIADMK hold		Swing		

=== Assembly election 1980 ===
1980 Tamil Nadu Legislative Assembly election : Acharapakkam
Party	Candidate	Votes	%	±%
AIADMK	C. Ganesan	35,233	50.08%	New
DMK	C. M. Manavalan	35,114	49.92%	▲11.25
Margin of victory		119	0.17%	▼4.34
Turnout		71,590	69.65%	▲5.71
Total valid votes		70,347		
Rejected ballots		1,243	1.74%	▼0.08
Registered electors		102,790		▲4.17
AIADMK gain from AIADMK		Swing	▲6.89	

=== Assembly election 1977 ===
1977 Tamil Nadu Legislative Assembly election : Acharapakkam
Party	Candidate	Votes	%	±%
AIADMK	K. Ethirajan	26,756	43.19%	New
DMK	N. Muthuvel	23,959	38.67%	▼28.10
INC	R. Kuppuswamy	6,366	10.28%	New
JP	T. Ayyavoo	4,871	7.86%	New
Margin of victory		2,797	4.51%	▼39.69
Turnout		63,099	63.94%	▼10.00
Total valid votes		61,952		
Rejected ballots		1,147	1.82%	▲1.82
Registered electors		98,677		▲15.98
AIADMK gain from DMK		Swing	▼23.58	

=== Assembly election 1971 ===
1971 Tamil Nadu Legislative Assembly election : Acharapakkam
Party	Candidate	Votes	%	±%
DMK	V. Balasundaram	39,816	66.77%	New
INC	C. Ganesan	13,457	22.57%	New
Independent	A. Perumal	4,346	7.29%	
Independent	C. Elumalai	1,652	2.77%	
Independent	J. R. Jeyaraj	365	0.61%	
Margin of victory		26,359	44.20%	▲19.99
Turnout		62,913	73.94%	▼3.68
Total valid votes		59,636		
Registered electors		85,083		▲1.83
DMK gain from SWA		Swing	▲4.66	

=== Assembly election 1967 ===
1967 Madras State Legislative Assembly election : Acharapakkam
Party	Candidate	Votes	%	±%
SWA	P. S. Ellappan	38,223	62.11%	New
INC	P. Saradambal	23,322	37.89%	▼10.66
Margin of victory		14,901	24.21%	▲16.31
Turnout		64,858	77.62%	▲4.42
Total valid votes		61,545		
Registered electors		83,554		▲2.35
SWA gain from INC		Swing	▲13.56	

=== Assembly election 1962 ===
1962 Madras State Legislative Assembly election : Acharapakkam
Party	Candidate	Votes	%	±%
INC	Venkatasubba Reddy	27,170	48.55%	New
DMK	V. Venka	22,748	40.65%	New
Socialist Party (India)	O. N. Borai Babu	6,044	10.80%	New
Margin of victory		4,422	7.90%	
Turnout		59,756	73.20%	
Total valid votes		55,962		
Registered electors		81,633		
INC win (new seat)				
