= Tamilnad Socialist Labour Party =

- Leader: S.C.C. Anthony Pillai
- Founded: April 1959
- Dissolved: 8 April 1962
- Split from: Socialist Party
- Merged into: Tamil National Party
- Ideology: Socialism
- Seats in the Lok Sabha: 1 / 496

The Tamilnad Socialist Labour Party was a political party in Madras State of India, active between 1959 and 1962. The party was led by S.C.C. Anthony Pillai, a prominent labour leader and member of the Second Lok Sabha (the lower house of the Parliament of India). The party contested the 1962 elections unsuccessfully, and would soon thereafter merge into the Tamil National Party.

== Split in the Socialist Party ==
The party emerged from a split in the Socialist Party of Dr. Ram Manohar Lohia. S.C.C. Anthony Pillai (who was one of the Socialist Party candidates elected to the Lok Sabha in the 1957 Indian general election) and his grouping in Madras State broke away from the Socialist Party in early 1959, arguing that the Socialist Party under Lohia was characterized by 'dictatorial tendencies'. The S.C.C. Anthony Pillai group formed the Tamilnad Socialist Labour Party in April 1959. Among the leaders that sided with the Tamilnad Socialist Labour Party was S. Pakkirisamy Pillai, general secretary of the Madras Port Trust Employees Union and member of the Madras State Legislative Assembly representing the Perambur constituency. The party published the journal Manithakulam ('Mankind').

== 1962 elections ==
The party contested the 1962 Lok Sabha election and the 1962 Madras State Legislative Assembly election. It fielded one candidate in the Lok Sabha election, S.C.C. Anthony Pillai contesting the Madras North Lok Sabha constituency. He finished in third place with 80,227 votes (24.74% of the votes in the constituency). The party fielded seven candidates in for the legislative assembly,

Constituency	Candidate	Votes	%	Rank
Purasawalkam	S. Pakkirisamy Pillai	18,713	28.64%	2nd
Madavaram	Balaram	3,364	5.29%	3rd
Saidapet	N.S. Naidu	2,888	4.52%	3rd
Uthiramerur	T.G. Sundaramoorthy	1421	2.26%	4th
Bodinayakkanur	R.K. Rajan	12,668	19.54%	3rd
Sholavandan	K. Subbiah alias Alagumalai	770	1.38%	6th
Saliamangalam	Murugesan	3,362	5.29%	4th

All in all the party obtained 43,186 votes in the legislative assembly election, getting 9.81% of the votes in the constituencies contested.

== Merger with the Tamil National Party ==
The Tamilnad Socialist Labour Party merged with the Tamil National Party of E.V.K. Sampath on 8 April 1962. E.V.K. Sampath and S.C.C. Anthony Pillai announced the merger together, the unified party retained the name Tamil National Party. In the process of the merger the Tamilnad Socialist Labour Party accepted the position of the Tamil National Party to demand Tamil national autonomy within an Indian federation with the right to secede.
