= P. S. Ellappan =

Indian politician

Member of the Tamil Nadu Legislative Assembly
- In office 1962–1967
- Preceded by: V. Venka
- Constituency: Acharapakkam

Personal details
- Party: Swatantra Party

P. S. Ellappan was an Indian politician and former Member of the Legislative Assembly of Tamil Nadu. He was elected to the Tamil Nadu legislative assembly as a Swatantra Party candidate from Acharapakkam constituency in 1967 election.
