= Mayiladuthurai Lok Sabha constituency =

Parliamentary constituency in Tamil Nadu, India

Coordinates: 11°06′07″N 79°34′47″E

Mayiladuthurai
- Lok Sabha constituency
- Interactive map of Mayiladuthurai Loksabha constituency, post-2008 delimitation

Constituency details
- Country: India
- Region: South India
- State: Tamil Nadu
- Assembly constituencies: Sirkazhi; Mayiladuthurai; Poompuhar; Thiruvidaimarudur; Kumbakonam; Papanasam
- Established: 1984
- Total electors: 14,84,348
- Reservation: None

Member of Parliament
- 18th Lok Sabha
- Incumbent R Sudha
- Party: INC
- Alliance: INDIA
- Elected year: 2024

Mayiladuthurai is a Lok Sabha (Parliament of India) constituency in Tamil Nadu. Its Tamil Nadu Parliamentary Constituency number is 28 of 39. It spreads on two districts, Mayiladuthurai and Thanjavur.

== History ==
Mayiladuthurai (Lok Sabha constituency) has six assembly constituencies – Mayiladuthurai, Sirkali (SC), Poompuhar, Thiruvidaimarudur (SC), Kumbakonam and Papanasam.

The constituency was constituted during the third Lok Sabha (lower house) as Mayuram until the 1980 elections, when it was renamed Mayiladuthurai. During the first elections in 1957, Mayiladuthurai was part of Chidambaram constituency and was held by the Indian National Congress party. From 1962, the Mayiladuthurai parliament seat was held by the Dravida Munnetra Kazhagam (DMK) twice between 1967 and 1971, and from 1971 to 1977, Tamil Maanila Congress for two terms between 1998 and 1999, and 1996 to 1998, Anna Dravida Munnetra Kazhagam twice during 2009 and 2014, Indian National Congress for eight terms during 1962–67, 1977–80, 1980–84, 1984–89, 1989–91, 1991–96, 1999–2004, and 2004–09.

Popular Communist leader K. Ananda Nambiar represented Mayiladuthurai in the Lok Sabha from 1951 to 1957. Mani Shankar Aiyar who served as a minister in India's cabinet was elected to the Parliament from the Mayiladuthurai Lok Sabha constituency in the 1991, 1999 and 2004 elections. in 2014, the Member of Parliament from the constituency was R.K. Bharathi Mohan of the AIADMK party.

The current Member of Parliament from the constituency is Sudha Ramakrishnan of the Indian National CongressIndian National Congress party.

== Assembly segments ==
=== 2009–present ===
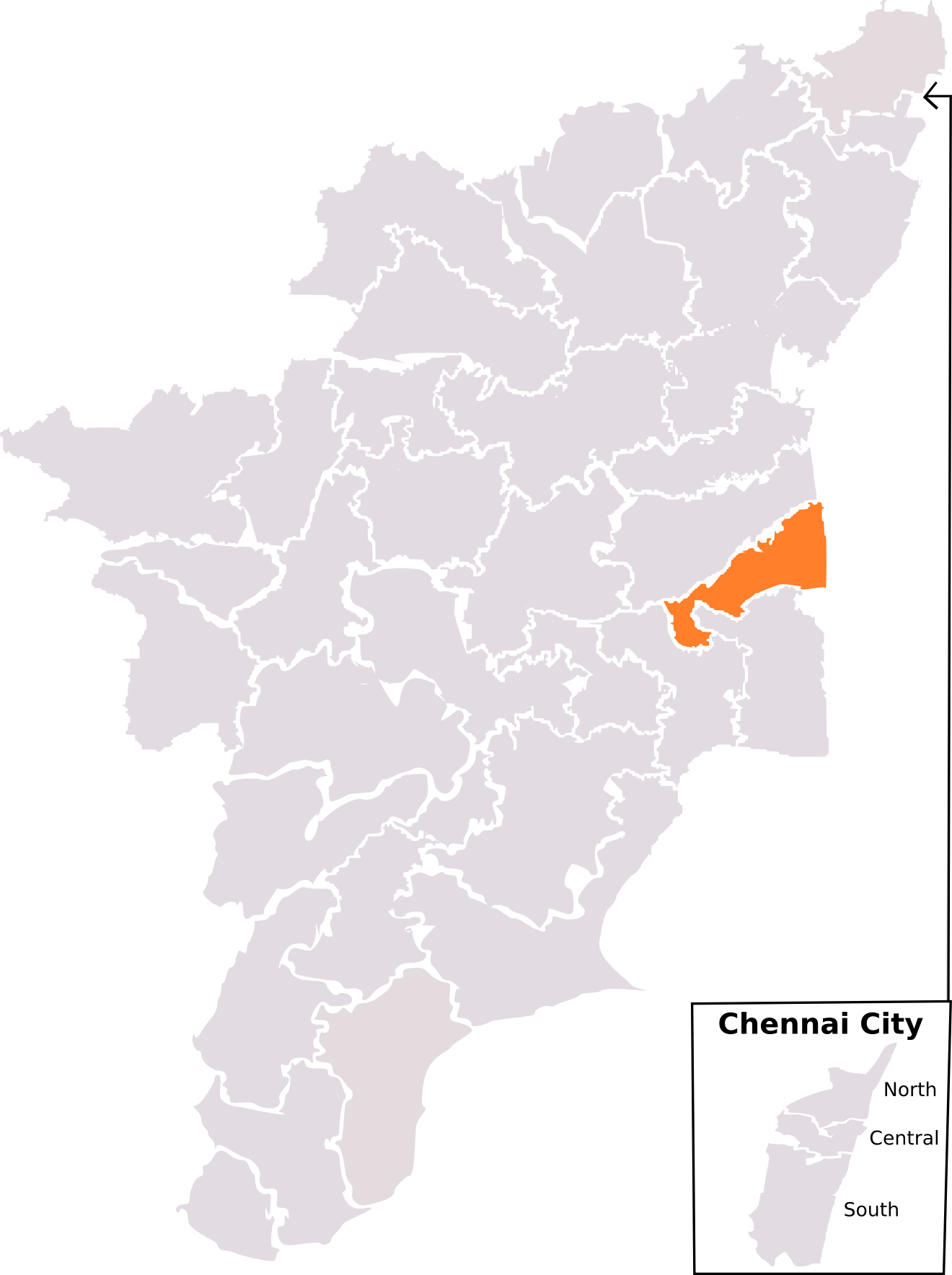
Mayiladuthurai constituency as laid out by 2008 Delimitation

Mayiladuthurai Lok Sabha constituency is composed of the following assembly segments:

Constituency number	Name	Reserved for (SC/ST/None)	District	Party	2024 Lead
160	Sirkazhi	SC	Mayiladuthurai	DMK	INC
161	Mayiladuthurai	None	Mayiladuthurai	INC	INC
162	Poompuhar	None	Mayiladuthurai	DMK	INC
170	Thiruvidaimarudur	SC	Thanjavur	DMK	INC
171	Kumbakonam	None	Thanjavur	TVK	INC
172	Papanasam	None	Thanjavur	IUML	INC

=== Before 2009 ===
1. Sirkazhi (SC)
2. Poompuhar
3. Kuttalam (defunct)
4. Kumbakonam
5. Thiruvidaimarudur
6. Mayiladuthurai

== Members of Parliament ==
Duration	Winner	Party
1952	K. Ananda Nambiar & V Veeraswamy	Communist Party of India & Independent SC Candidate
1962	Maragatham Chandrasekar	Indian National Congress
1967	K. Subravelu	Dravida Munnetra Kazhagam
1971	K. Subravelu	Dravida Munnetra Kazhagam
1977	N. Kudanthai Ramalingam	Indian National Congress
1980	N. Kudanthai Ramalingam	Indian National Congress
1984	E.S.M. Packeer Mohamed	Indian National Congress
1989	E.S.M. Packeer Mohamed	Indian National Congress
1991	Mani Shankar Aiyar	Indian National Congress
1996	P. V. Rajendran	Tamil Maanila Congress
1998	K. Krishnamoorthy	Tamil Maanila Congress
1999	Mani Shankar Aiyar	Indian National Congress
2004	Mani Shankar Aiyar	Indian National Congress
2009	O. S. Manian	All India Anna Dravida Munnetra Kazhagam
2014	R. K. Bharathi Mohan	All India Anna Dravida Munnetra Kazhagam
2019	S. Ramalingam	Dravida Munnetra Kazhagam
2024	Sudha Ramakrishnan	Indian National Congress

== Election results ==
Vote share of Winning candidates
2024	47.67%
2019	54.83%
2014	50.75%
2009	45.60%
2004	59.11%
1999	50.23%
1998	45.68%
1996	55.70%
1991	58.98%
1989	52.42%
1984	60.16%
1980	57.20%
1977	55.94%
1971	53.84%
1967	57.09%
1962	45.74%
1951	22.49%

=== General Elections 2024 ===
2024 Indian general election: Mayiladuthurai
Party	Candidate	Votes	%	±%
INC	Sudha Ramakrishnan	518,459	47.67	
AIADMK	P. Babu	247,276	22.73	
PMK	Ma.Ka.Stalin	166,437	15.30	
NOTA	None of the above	8,695	0.80	
Margin of victory		271,183	24.94	−
Turnout		1,068,509	98.23	
INC gain from DMK		Swing		

=== General Elections 2019 ===
2019 Indian general election: Mayiladuthurai
Party	Candidate	Votes	%	±%
DMK	S. Ramalingam	599,292	54.83	
AIADMK	S. Asaimani	3,37,978	30.92	−19.82
Independent	S. Senthamizhan	69,030	6.32	
MNM	M. Refayudeen	17,005	1.56	
NOTA	None of the above	8,231	0.75	−0.55
Margin of victory		2,61,314	23.91	−3.46
Turnout		10,92,917	73.93	−1.37
Registered electors		14,84,842		9.96
DMK gain from AIADMK		Swing	4.09	

=== General Elections 2014 ===
2014 Indian general election: Mayiladuthurai
Party	Candidate	Votes	%	±%
AIADMK	R. K. Bharathi Mohan	513,729	50.75	5.15
MNMK	S. Hyder Ali	2,36,679	23.38	
PMK	K. Agoram	1,44,085	14.23	
INC	Mani Shankar Aiyar	58,465	5.78	−35.20
NOTA	None of the above	13,181	1.30	
Independent	R. Pandiyan	11,613	1.15	
Independent	R. Fathima Alias Bharathi	7,582	0.75	
Independent	A. Raguraman	7,214	0.71	
Independent	A. Revathi	6,286	0.62	
Independent	R. Thirunavukkarasu	4,714	0.47	
Margin of victory		2,77,050	27.37	22.75
Turnout		10,12,357	76.03	1.81
Registered electors		13,50,318		23.71
AIADMK hold		Swing	5.15	

=== General Elections 2009 ===
2009 Indian general election: Mayiladuthurai
Party	Candidate	Votes	%	±%
AIADMK	O. S. Manian	364,089	45.60	14.62
INC	Mani Shankar Aiyar	3,27,235	40.98	−18.13
DMDK	K. Pandian	44,754	5.60	
MNMK	Dr. M. H. Jawahirullah	19,814	2.48	
BJP	S. Karthikeyan	7,486	0.94	
BSP	V. S. Chandirakumar	5,554	0.70	
Margin of victory		36,854	4.62	−23.52
Turnout		7,98,527	73.25	5.09
Registered electors		10,91,519		6.80
AIADMK gain from INC		Swing	-13.51	

=== General Elections 2004 ===
2004 Indian general election: Mayiladuthurai
Party	Candidate	Votes	%	±%
INC	Mani Shankar Aiyar	411,160	59.11	8.88
AIADMK	O. S. Manian	2,15,469	30.97	
JD(U)	J. Rajan	49,124	7.06	
Independent	U. Rahmathullah	8,335	1.20	
Independent	D. Malarvizhi	3,573	0.51	
Margin of victory		1,95,691	28.13	21.92
Turnout		6,95,627	68.09	4.45
Registered electors		10,22,018		−0.84
INC hold		Swing	8.88	

=== General Elections 1999 ===
1999 Indian general election: Mayiladuthurai
Party	Candidate	Votes	%	±%
INC	Mani Shankar Aiyar	324,384	50.23	47.79
PMK	P. D. Arul Mozhi	2,84,253	44.02	5.11
TMC(M)	K. Krishnamoorthy	34,998	5.42	
Margin of victory		40,131	6.21	−0.56
Turnout		6,45,796	63.61	−8.96
Registered electors		10,30,626		4.03
INC gain from TMC(M)		Swing	-5.47	

=== General Elections 1998 ===
1998 Indian general election: Mayiladuthurai
Party	Candidate	Votes	%	±%
TMC(M)	K. Krishnamoorthy	286,098	45.68	
PMK	P. D. Arul Mozhi	2,43,642	38.90	33.05
Independent	Mani Shankar Aiyar	72,911	11.64	
INC	R. Thirunavukkarasu	15,265	2.44	−30.01
Margin of victory		42,456	6.78	−16.48
Turnout		6,26,270	64.97	−7.60
Registered electors		9,90,666		4.18
TMC(M) hold		Swing	-10.02	

=== General Elections 1996 ===
1996 Indian general election: Mayiladuthurai
Party	Candidate	Votes	%	±%
TMC(M)	P. V. Rajendran	367,778	55.70	
INC	Mani Shankar Aiyar	2,14,234	32.45	−26.53
PMK	Kothai Kesavan	38,656	5.85	
MDMK	A. Venkatesan	30,209	4.58	
Independent	S. Raja Pather	3,030	0.46	
Margin of victory		1,53,544	23.25	−2.94
Turnout		6,60,278	72.57	1.50
Registered electors		9,50,926		5.34
TMC(M) gain from INC		Swing	-3.28	

=== General Elections 1991 ===
1991 Indian general election: Mayiladuthurai
Party	Candidate	Votes	%	±%
INC	Mani Shankar Aiyar	364,598	58.98	6.56
DMK	P. Kalayanam Kuttalam	2,02,661	32.78	−4.47
IUML	A. K. A. Abdul Samad	37,677	6.09	
BJP	Jaga Veerapandian	5,479	0.89	
Independent	S. Manisekar	4,109	0.66	
Margin of victory		1,61,937	26.20	11.04
Turnout		6,18,188	71.07	−3.62
Registered electors		9,02,685		−0.86
INC hold		Swing	6.56	

=== General Elections 1989 ===
1989 Indian general election: Mayiladuthurai
Party	Candidate	Votes	%	±%
INC	E.S.M. Packeer Mohamed	352,492	52.42	−7.75
DMK	P. Kalyanam	2,50,547	37.26	−1.42
PMK	K. Kottrava Moorthy	64,203	9.55	
Margin of victory		1,01,945	15.16	−6.33
Turnout		6,72,495	74.69	−5.50
Registered electors		9,10,538		26.26
INC hold		Swing	-7.75	

=== General Elections 1984 ===
1984 Indian general election: Mayiladuthurai
Party	Candidate	Votes	%	±%
INC	E.S.M. Packeer Mohamed	335,033	60.16	
DMK	P. Kalayanam	2,15,390	38.68	
Independent	S. Krithivasan	4,697	0.84	
Margin of victory		1,19,643	21.49	3.44
Turnout		5,56,859	80.19	3.20
Registered electors		7,21,157		6.57
INC gain from INC(I)		Swing	2.96	

=== General Elections 1980 ===
1980 Indian general election: Mayiladuthurai
Party	Candidate	Votes	%	±%
INC(I)	Kudanthai N. Ramalingam	291,625	57.20	
JP	S. Govindasamy	1,99,620	39.16	
JP(S)	P. Mayuram Sundaresan	13,743	2.70	
Independent	T. Malavai Singaravelan	4,822	0.95	
Margin of victory		92,005	18.05	2.78
Turnout		5,09,810	76.99	0.35
Registered electors		6,76,693		4.45
INC(I) gain from INC		Swing	1.26	

=== General Elections 1977 ===
1977 Indian general election: Mayiladuthurai
Party	Candidate	Votes	%	±%
INC	Kudanthai N. Ramalingam	272,202	55.94	
INC(O)	S. Govindasamy	1,97,937	40.68	
Independent	K. B. S. Manee	14,554	2.99	
Margin of victory		74,265	15.26	−1.97
Turnout		4,86,569	76.64	−2.73
Registered electors		6,47,843		28.58
INC gain from DMK		Swing	2.11	

=== General Elections 1971 ===
1971 Indian general election: Mayiladuthurai
Party	Candidate	Votes	%	±%
DMK	K. Subravelu	207,304	53.84	−3.25
INC(O)	K. Rajangam	1,40,931	36.60	
CPI(M)	P. S. Dhanushkodi	36,829	9.56	
Margin of victory		66,373	17.24	3.07
Turnout		3,85,064	79.37	−2.71
Registered electors		5,03,830		7.94
DMK hold		Swing	-3.25	

=== General Elections 1967 ===
1967 Indian general election: Mayiladuthurai
Party	Candidate	Votes	%	±%
DMK	K. Subravelu	209,660	57.09	24.60
INC	Maragatham Chandrasekar	1,57,616	42.91	−2.82
Margin of victory		52,044	14.17	0.92
Turnout		3,67,276	82.08	6.75
Registered electors		4,66,790		3.96
DMK gain from INC		Swing	11.35	

=== General Elections 1962 ===
1962 Indian general election: Mayiladuthurai
Party	Candidate	Votes	%	±%
INC	Maragatham Chandrasekar	149,330	45.74	
DMK	Subirra Velu	1,06,059	32.48	
CPI	Veerappan	71,098	21.78	
Margin of victory		43,271	13.25	
Turnout		3,26,487	75.32	
Registered electors		4,49,027		
INC win (new seat)				

=== General Elections 1951 ===
1951–52 Indian general election: Mayiladuthurai
Party	Candidate	Votes	%	±%
CPI	K. Ananda Nambiar	198,743	22.49	
INC	K. Santhanam	189,089	21.40	21.40
Independent	V. Veeraswami	1,76,639	19.99	
INC	R. Subramanyam	1,68,343	19.05	19.05
CPI	Veerappan Voikaran	83,440	9.44	
Independent	M. Jagadesan	45,561	5.16	
RPI	Veeran Ilam Singam	21,950	2.48	
Margin of victory		9,654	1.09	
Turnout		8,83,765	121.02	
Registered electors		7,30,234		0.00
CPI win (new seat)				

== See also ==
- Mayiladuthurai
- Kumbakonam
- List of constituencies of the Lok Sabha
