= S. K. Vedarathinam =

Indian politician

- Born: 18 March 1958 (age 68); Thethakudi South, Vedaranyam
- Occupations: Politician, Farmer
- Political party: Dravida Munnetra Kazhagam
- Spouse: Isaiyarasi
- Children: 2
- Parent: Kailasha Gounder-Sarathambal

S. K. Vedarathinam (தமிழ் : எஸ். கே. வேதரத்தினம்) is an Indian politician and former Member of the Legislative Assembly of Tamil Nadu. He was elected to the Tamil Nadu legislative assembly as a Dravida Munnetra Kazhagam candidate from Vedaranyam constituency in 1996, 2001, 2006 elections. He won 3 consecutive elections in Vedaranyam constituency. Later he joined BJP and is a former national executive member of 2011 election. He is one among the 11 State secretaries of BJP, Tamilnadu during his involvement with BJP. He again joined DMK on 22.07.2020 with his followers. He was National General Council member of BJP at the time he rejoined DMK in 2020.

== Electoral performance ==
2021 Tamil Nadu Legislative Assembly election: Vedaranyam
Party	Candidate	Votes	%	±%
AIADMK	O. S. Manian	78,719	50.02%	+8.58
DMK	S. K. Vedarathinam	66,390	42.18%	New
NTK	K. Rajendran	9,106	5.79%	+4.84
AMMK	P. S. Arumugam	1,284	0.82%	New
Margin of victory		12,329	7.83%	−7.83%
Turnout		157,387	81.69%	0.27%
Rejected ballots		185	0.12%	
Registered electors		192,658		
AIADMK hold		Swing	8.58%	

2016 Tamil Nadu Legislative Assembly election: Vedaranyam
Party	Candidate	Votes	%	±%
AIADMK	O. S. Manian	60,836	41.44%	+0.28
INC	P. V. Rajendiran	37,838	25.77%	New
BJP	S. K. Vedarathinam	37,086	25.26%	+24.3
DMDK	T. Vairavanathan	4,594	3.13%	New
PMK	Usha Kannan	2,081	1.42%	−16.12
NTK	K. Rajendran	1,386	0.94%	New
NOTA	NOTA	1,206	0.82%	New
Margin of victory		22,998	15.67%	7.31%
Turnout		146,803	81.42%	−2.87%
Registered electors		180,294		
AIADMK hold		Swing	0.28%	

2011 Tamil Nadu Legislative Assembly election: Vedaranyam
Party	Candidate	Votes	%	±%
AIADMK	N. V. Kamaraj	53,799	41.16%	−3.86
Independent	S. K. Vedarathinam	42,871	32.80%	New
PMK	R. Chinnathurai	22,925	17.54%	New
Independent	K. Jegan	2,270	1.74%	New
JMM	G. Shanmugavel	2,041	1.56%	New
Independent	M. Rani	1,991	1.52%	New
Independent	D. Ramsingh	1,826	1.40%	New
BJP	S. Karthikeyan	1,260	0.96%	+0.01
Independent	T. V. R. Veeramani	838	0.64%	New
Margin of victory		10,928	8.36%	3.45%
Turnout		130,708	84.29%	0.93%
Registered electors		155,065		
AIADMK gain from DMK		Swing	-8.77%	

2006 Tamil Nadu Legislative Assembly election: Vedaranyam
Party	Candidate	Votes	%	±%
DMK	S. K. Vedarathinam	66,401	49.93%	−3.78
AIADMK	O. S. Manian	59,870	45.02%	New
DMDK	B. Veera Vinayagam	1,708	1.28%	New
BJP	M. Udayakumar	1,267	0.95%	New
SP	G. Mahendran	1,049	0.79%	New
Independent	G. Vedarathinam	817	0.61%	New
Margin of victory		6,531	4.91%	−7.76%
Turnout		132,984	83.37%	9.19%
Registered electors		159,520		
DMK hold		Swing	-3.78%	

2001 Tamil Nadu Legislative Assembly election: Vedaranyam
Party	Candidate	Votes	%	±%
DMK	S. K. Vedarathinam	63,568	53.71%	+6.79
CPI	R. Mutharasan	48,568	41.04%	New
MDMK	N. Ilangovan	3,678	3.11%	−22.22
Independent	R. Ramamurthy	2,539	2.15%	New
Margin of victory		15,000	12.67%	−7.06%
Turnout		118,353	74.18%	−4.34%
Registered electors		159,591		
DMK hold		Swing	6.79%	

1996 Tamil Nadu Legislative Assembly election: Vedaranyam
Party	Candidate	Votes	%	±%
DMK	S. K. Vedarathinam	54,185	46.92%	+12.54
INC	P. C. V. Balasubramaniam	31,393	27.19%	−22.04
MDMK	M. Meenakshi Sundaram	29,252	25.33%	New
Margin of victory		22,792	19.74%	4.90%
Turnout		115,473	78.52%	−3.98%
Registered electors		154,906		
DMK gain from INC		Swing	-2.30%	
