= M. S. Manickam =

Indian politician(1946–2010), businessman, and farmer

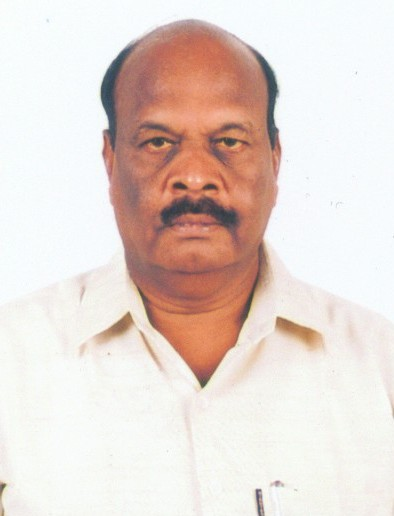
- Official Portrait, 2008

Member of Tamil Nadu Legislative Assembly
- In office 9 June 1980 – 15 November 1984
- Preceded by: M. Meenakshi Sundaram
- Succeeded by: M. Meenakshi Sundaram
- Constituency: Vedaranyam

Personal details
- Born: Manickam Sabapathy; 26 October 1946 (age 79) Thagattur, Madras Presidency, British India
- Died: 14 December 2010 (aged 64) Chennai, Tamil Nadu, India
- Party: Dravida Munnetra Kazhagam (2009–10)
- Other political affiliations: All India Anna Dravida Munnetra Kazhagam (1974–93)
- Spouse: Latha (m. 1964)
- Children: 2, (Radha (b. 1982), Srinivasan (b. 1985))
- Parent(s): M. Sabapathy, Bhavani
- Relatives: Manickam family
- Education: M.A
- Alma mater: Alagappa Government Arts College, Karaikudi, Alagappa University and Pachaiyappa's College, Chennai, Madras University
- Occupation: Politician, Farmer & Businessmen
- Nickname: MSM

M.S. Manickam (Tamil: எம்.எஸ்.மாணிக்கம்), also known locally as MSM, (born October 26, 1946) was an Indian politician, businessman, and farmer. He served as a Member of the Legislative Assembly of Tamil Nadu. Born on 26 October 1946, he was a public figure in his region and was associated with political, commercial, and community activities over several decades. He was involved in business activities, including a partnership in retail shop operations for a limited period, and also had associations with agriculture through management of ancestral farmland. Alongside his professional engagements, he was active in local public life and was recognized within his constituency for his participation in civic and social affairs.

== Family life ==
M.S. Manickam was born in the village of Thagattur in Vedaranyam taluk, Nagapattinam district, into a close-knit family. As the eldest son, he held a significant role within the household. His immediate family includes his wife Latha, his daughter Radha, and his son Srinivasan.

The family resided in their ancestral village of Thagattur until 1991. In order to facilitate better educational opportunities for their children, he later relocated to the nearby town of Thiruthuraipoondi in Thiruvarur district, and subsequently moved to Tiruchirappalli in 2001, where the children pursued higher education.

He is a follower of Hinduism.

== Education ==
M.S. Manickam completed his undergraduate and postgraduate studies in Arts at Alagappa Government Arts College, Karaikudi, which was later affiliated with Alagappa University. He pursued his higher education in the field of arts and humanities during this period.

He also continued further studies at Pachaiyappa's College, Chennai, affiliated with University of Madras, where he expanded his academic exposure in the arts stream.

== Role ==
=== Farmer ===
M.S. Manickam had a general familiarity with agriculture, shaped by his upbringing in a delta region where farming was a common way of life. He was not engaged as a full-time farmer, but was associated with the management of ancestral agricultural lands. Farming operations were largely carried out through hired labour, with his involvement being occasional and supervisory in nature.

=== Business ===
M.S. Manickam was engaged in business activities, including a partnership in a retail outlet for a limited period, alongside his other professional and public engagements. (Further details regarding the scope and duration of his business involvement may be added when supported by reliable sources.)

=== Politics ===
==== ADMK (1972–1993) ====
M.S. Manickam’s political involvement began during his college years, where he was influenced by the popularity and public campaigns of M.G. Ramachandran. He was also inspired by MGR’s film career and his philanthropic initiatives, which were widely supported by student groups and fan associations, including charity activities organised during his college period. Influenced by his seniors and mentors involved in these initiatives, he developed an interest in public service.

In 1972, he joined the newly formed All India Anna Dravida Munnetra Kazhagam (ADMK), led by M.G. Ramachandran, following the split from the DMK. His early political outlook was shaped by the ideals associated with MGR’s leadership and welfare-oriented politics, which he continued to support throughout his association with the party.

===== Member of the Legislative Assembly [1980–84] =====
M. S. Manickam first contested the Tamil Nadu legislative assembly elections in 1977 as an ADMK candidate from the Vedaranyam, at the age of 30. In this election, he was not successful and secured third place, while M. Meenakshi Sundaram of the DMK won the seat, and the Congress candidate finished second.

In the 1980 elections, he was elected to the Tamil Nadu legislative assembly from the Vedaranyam as an ADMK candidate at the age of 33.He became the fourth Member of the Legislative Assembly representing the Vedaranyam. During his term from 1980 to 1984, he was involved in constituency-level public service and development-related activities.

===== Exit from ADMK =====
Following the death of MGR in 1987 and the subsequent changes in party leadership within the All India Anna Dravida Munnetra Kazhagam (AIADMK), Manickam’s political position within the party gradually diminished. Over time, differences in the internal political environment limited his ability to continue active participation in party activities.

In 1995, he formally left the AIADMK, citing a lack of opportunities to continue his public service within the party framework.

==== Mentor (1995–2009) ====
After leaving the ADMK in 1995, he remained intermittently active in politics through the MGR Kazhagam, formed under the leadership of R. M. Veerappan. During this period, he gradually shifted his role from active politics to mentoring and supporting younger individuals who were entering public life.

He is noted to have encouraged and supported emerging political aspirants, assisting them during election campaigns and constituency-level political work, while maintaining a more advisory and supportive role.

==== DMK (2010–until Death) ====
In early 2010, he joined the Dravida Munnetra Kazhagam (DMK), along with several former legislators and former minister Alagu Thirunavukkarasu.

This transition marked his return to active political affiliation after a period of reduced engagement, with the intention of continuing his involvement in public life and social welfare activities through the party platform.

== Death ==
On the early hours of 14 December 2010, he experienced a sudden cardiac ailment and was taken to Apollo Hospital, Chennai, for medical treatment. Despite medical attention, he died the same day at 9:31 p.m. at the age of 64 due to a heart attack.

His funeral was held the following day at his native place, Thagattur, in Vedaranyam taluk. The funeral was attended by a large number of people, including family members, relatives, members of the public, and local political representatives from various parties, who gathered to pay their respects.

The final rites were performed by his son, Srinivasan, at the crematorium in Thagattur.

== Posts held ==
#	From	To	Position
1	1980	1984	Member, Tamil Nadu Legislative Assembly

== Electoral performance ==
1977 Tamil Nadu Legislative Assembly election: Vedaranyam
Party	Candidate	Votes	%	±%
DMK	M. Meenakshi Sundaram	29,601	35.40	−28.46
INC	S. Devarajan	28,009	33.50	+6.79
AIADMK	M. S. Manickam	21,530	25.75	New
JP	K. Gokilachandran	3,965	4.74	New
Independent	G. Venkatachalam	508	0.61	New
Margin of victory		1,592	1.90	−35.25
Turnout		83,613	82.89	0.71
Registered electors		101,857		
DMK hold		Swing	-28.46	

1980 Tamil Nadu Legislative Assembly election: Vedaranyam
Party	Candidate	Votes	%	±%
AIADMK	M. S. Manickam	52,311	60.86	+35.11
DMK	M. Meenakshi Sundaram	32,656	37.99	+2.59
JP	K. V. M. Subramania Gounder	988	1.15	New
Margin of victory		19,655	22.87	20.96
Turnout		85,955	80.79	−2.09
Registered electors		107,177		
AIADMK gain from DMK		Swing	25.46	

== Electoral performance ==
Election	Party	Constituency Name	Result	Votes gained	Vote share %
1980	AIADMK	Vedaranyam	Won	52,311	60.86%
