= Mani Shankar Aiyar =

Indian politician and former diplomat

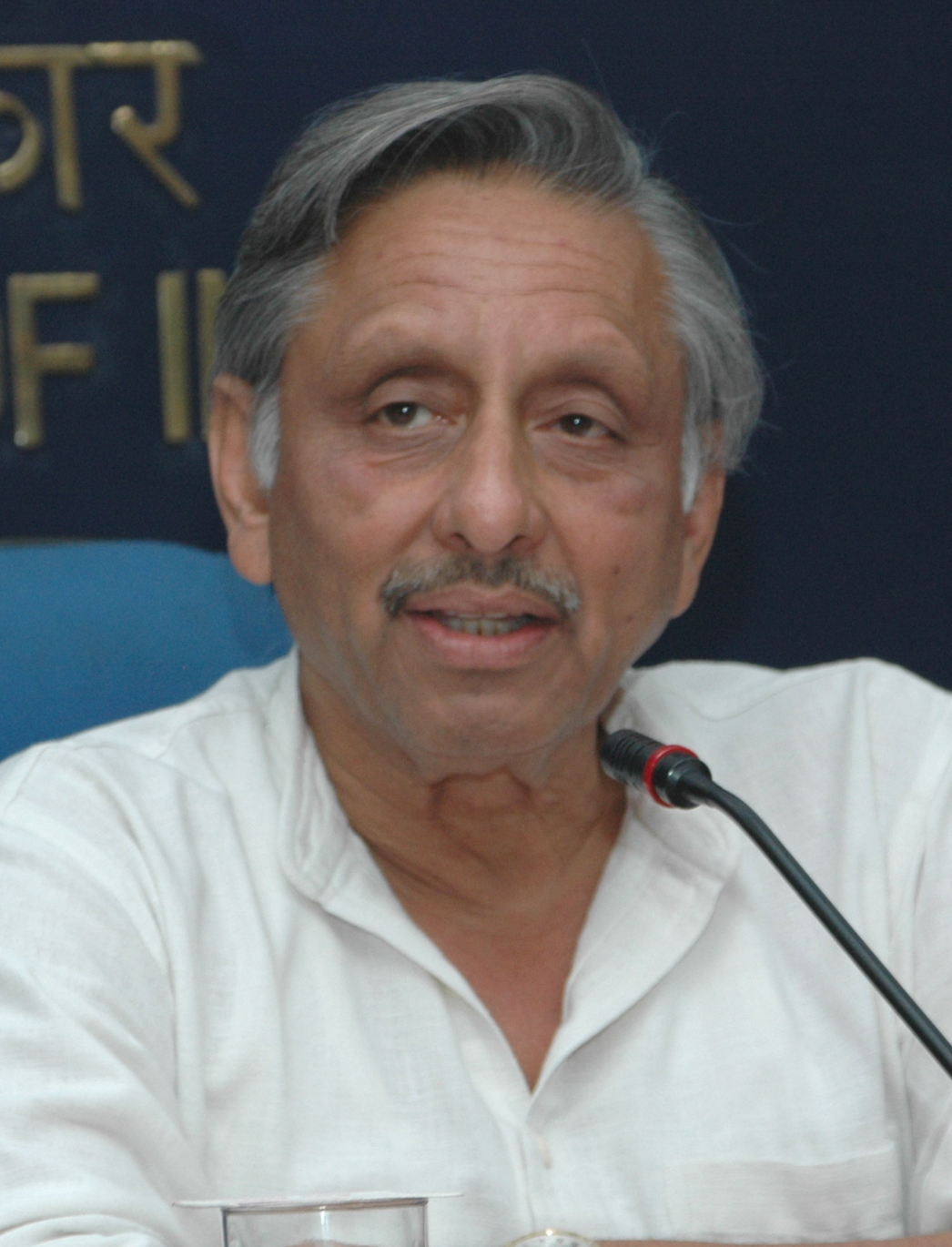

Minister of Panchayati Raj Government of India
- In office 23 May 2004 – 22 May 2009
- Prime Minister: Manmohan Singh
- Preceded by: Ministry created
- Succeeded by: C. P. Joshi

Minister of Petroleum and Natural Gas
- In office 23 May 2004 – 29 January 2006
- Prime Minister: Manmohan Singh
- Preceded by: Ram Naik
- Succeeded by: Murli Deora

Minister of Youth Affairs and Sports
- In office 29 January 2006 – 6 April 2008
- Preceded by: Oscar Fernandes, MoS (I/C)
- Succeeded by: M. S. Gill, MoS (I/C)

Minister for Development of North Eastern Region
- In office 24 October 2006 – 22 May 2009
- Preceded by: Paty Ripple Kyndiah
- Succeeded by: Bijoy Krishna Handique

Member of Parliament, Lok Sabha for Mayiladuthurai
- In office 6 October 1999 – 16 May 2009
- Preceded by: K. Krishnamoorthy
- Succeeded by: O. S. Manian
- In office 20 June 1991 – 10 May 1996
- Preceded by: E.S.M. Packeer Mohamed
- Succeeded by: P. V. Rajendran

Member of Parliament, Rajya Sabha (Nominated)
- In office 22 March 2010 – 21 March 2016

Personal details
- Born: 10 April 1941 (age 85) Lahore, Punjab, British India (present-day Punjab, Pakistan)
- Party: Indian National Congress
- Spouse: Suneet Vir Singh (aka Suneet Mani Aiyar)
- Relations: Swaminathan Aiyar (brother); Vidya Shankar Aiyar (nephew)
- Children: 3, including Yamini Aiyar
- Education: St. Stephen's College, Delhi (BA); Trinity Hall, Cambridge (BA, MA)
- Occupation: Diplomat; journalist/writer; politician; social worker

Mani Shankar Aiyar (born 10 April 1941) is an Indian politician and former diplomat. He is a member of the Indian National Congress party.

He represented the Mayiladuthurai constituency of Tamil Nadu in the 10th Lok Sabha, 13th Lok Sabha, and 14th Lok Sabha. He was a nominated member of parliament from Rajya Sabha.

== Early life and education ==
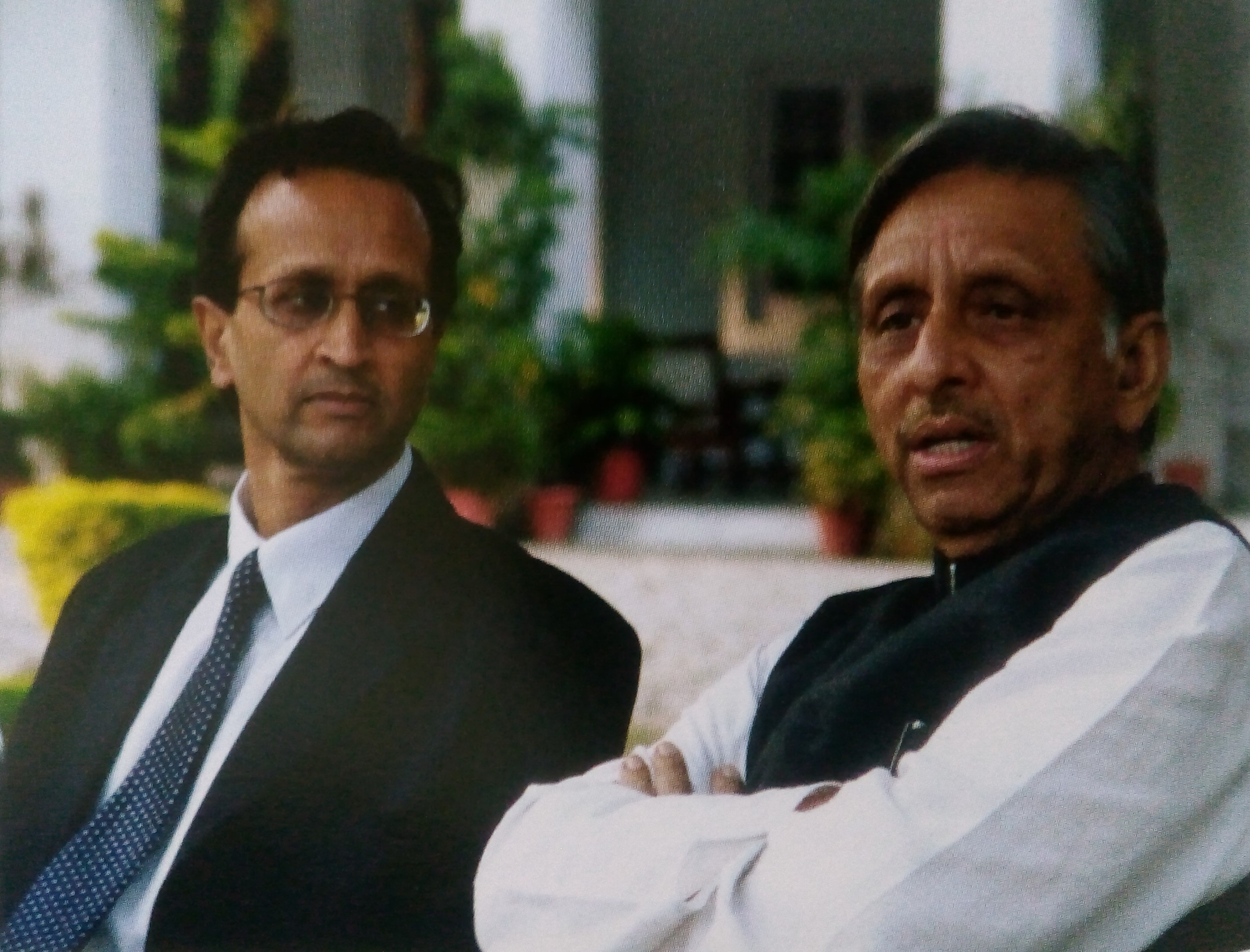
Aiyar with Kanti Bajpai, then headmaster, at The Doon School.

Mani Shankar Aiyar was born in Lahore, Punjab, British India. He was born in Laxmi Mansions, Lahore which as post-Partition refugee property, became house for the family of Saadat Hassan Manto.

He is the son of Vaidyanatha Shankar Aiyar, a chartered accountant, and Bhagyalakshmi Shankar Aiyar. He was born in Laxmi Mansions, Lahore in British India, which as post-Partition refugee property, became house for the family of Saadat Hassan Manto. His older brother is the journalist, Swaminathan Aiyar. He lost his father at age 12 in an air crash.

He attended Welham Boys' School, The Doon School and obtained B.A. in economics from St. Stephen's College, Delhi, University of Delhi. While at Doon, he was an editor of The Doon School Weekly. After the loss of his father, Aiyar's mother had to negotiate with Doon to allow him to continue his studies with reduced fees and in return she taught at the school.

He graduated in economics from Delhi University, and then did a two-year B.A. in Tripos in economics at Trinity Hall, Cambridge at the University of Cambridge which, in the Oxbridge tradition, became an M.A. with the passage of time. He was a member of Trinity Hall. He was also an active member of the Marxist Society in Cambridge. At Cambridge, Aiyar joined student politics and once even tried to win a presidential contest. Rajiv Gandhi, who was his junior both at Doon and Cambridge, supported him in his campaign.

== Positions held ==
Period	Position Held
6 April 2008 – 22 May 2009	Minister, Panchayati Raj and Minister of Development of North Eastern Region
29 January 2006 – 6 April 2008	Union Cabinet Minister of Panchayati Raj and Minister of Youth Affairs & Sports and Minister of Development of North Eastern Region
23 May 2004 – 28 January 2006	Union Cabinet Minister, Petroleum & Natural Gas; Panchayati Raj
2004	Re-elected to 14th Lok Sabha (3rd term)
2002–2004	Member, Committee on Public Undertakings
1999–2004	Member, Committee on Urban and Rural Development
1999	Elected to 13th Lok Sabha (2nd term)
1998	Secretary, All India Congress Committee
1998	Member, Committee on External Affairs
1992–1996	Member, Committee on Human Resource Development
1992	Elected to All India Congress Committee (AICC)
1991–1992	Member, Committee on Environment and Forests
1991	Elected to 10th Lok Sabha

== Career ==
He joined the Indian Foreign Service in 1963 and served as Joint Secretary to Government of India from 1982 to 1983 in Ministry of External Affairs and later as Joint Secretary at Prime Minister's Office from 1985 to 1989. He resigned from service in 1989 to take up a career in politics and media, entering the Parliament as a Congress MP from Mayiladuthurai in 1991, 1999 and 2004 but was defeated in 1996, 1998, 2009 and 2014. He spent some time in Pakistan posted as a diplomat, serving as India's first consul-general in Karachi from 1978 to 1982.

He is a special invitee to the Congress Working Committee and was a chairman of both the party's political training department and the department of policy planning and coordination. He is also a well-known political columnist and has written several books, including Pakistan Papers and Remembering Rajiv, and has edited a four-volume publication, Rajiv Gandhi's India.

His special interests include grassroots democracy, Indian foreign policy particularly with India's neighbouring countries, and West Asia and nuclear disarmament.

== Electoral History ==
=== Lok Sabha ===
Year	Constituency	Party	Votes	%	Opponent	Party	Votes	%	Result	Margin	%
2014	Mayiladuthurai	INC	58,465	5.78	R. K. Bharathi Mohan	ADMK	5,13,729	50.75	Lost	-4,55,264	-44.97
2009	Mayiladuthurai	INC	3,27,235	40.98	O. S. Manian	ADMK	3,64,089	45.60	Lost	-36,854	-4.62
2004	Mayiladuthurai	INC	4,11,160	59.11	O. S. Manian	ADMK	2,15,469	30.97	Won	+1,95,691	+28.14
1999	Mayiladuthurai	INC	3,24,384	50.23	P. D. Arul Mozhi	PMK	2,84,253	44.02	Won	+40,131	+6.21
1998	Mayiladuthurai	IND	72,911	11.64	K. Krishnamoorthy	TMC	2,86,098	45.68	Lost	-2,13,187	-34.04
1996	Mayiladuthurai	INC	2,14,234	32.45	P. V. Rajendran	TMC	3,67,778	55.70	Lost	-1,53,544	-23.25
1991	Mayiladuthurai	INC	3,64,598	58.98	P. Kalayanam Kuttalam	DMK	2,02,661	32.78	Won	+1,61,937	+26.20

== Personal life ==
He was married on 4 January 1973 to Suneet Vir Singh, a Sikh woman. They have 3 daughters – the eldest, Suranya Aiyar is a lawyer; the second, Yamini Aiyar is a senior research fellow and director of the Accountability Initiative.

Aiyar is the uncle of Vidya Shankar Aiyar, former anchor on Channelnews asia and CNN- IBN.

== Controversies ==
While on a tour of the Andamans as the Cabinet Minister in the later part of 2004, Aiyar was quoted as saying at the Cellular Jail there that there was no difference between Hindutva ideologue Vinayak Savarkar and Pakistan's founder Mohammed Ali Jinnah as they shared a 'divisive' philosophy. He also ordered that a plaque with a poem commemorating Savarkar be replaced with a plaque with quotes from Mahatma Gandhi. Reports of the incident paralysed Parliament and led to agitations by the Shiv Sena in Maharashtra. Aiyar's remarks created confusion as well in the ruling party; the official spokesman, Anand Sharma, noted that the Congress Party did not consider Savarkar either a freedom fighter or a patriot. A few days later, the Prime Minister dissociated himself and the cabinet from that view.

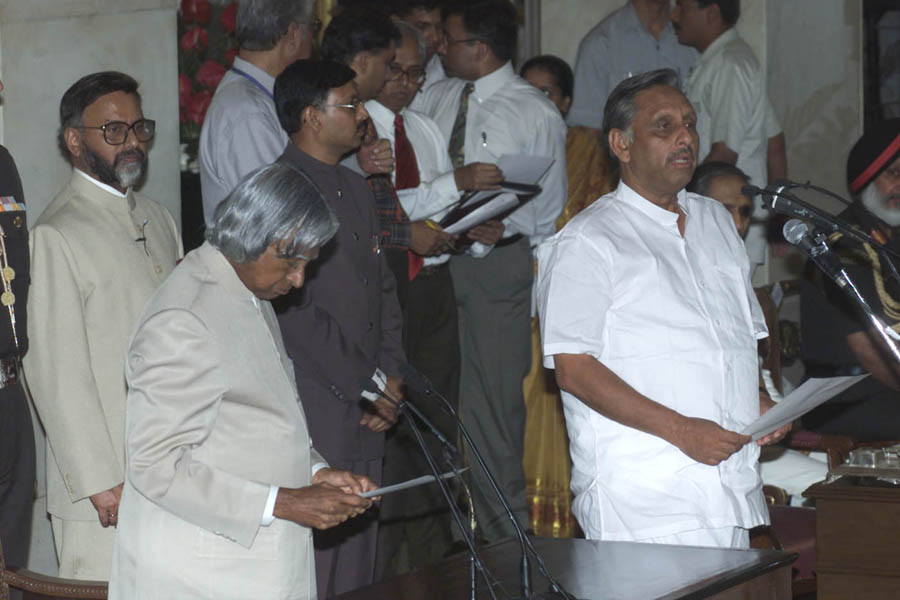
11th President of India A. P. J. Abdul Kalam administering the oath as Cabinet Minister at a Swearing-in Ceremony in New Delhi on 2004.

In September 2011, Aiyar visited his alma mater—St. Stephen's College—to speak about 'Governance and Corruption: Is Panchayati Raj A Solution?'. However, he began to mock the Hansraj College and its former student Ajay Maken. He also belittled the Kirori Mal College and the BA (Programme) Degree, a course in the University of Delhi. This led to an agitation by the students of Hansraj College. When the agitated students approached him, he mocked them even further. When later questioned by the media, Aiyar refused to apologise and rather ridiculed the institutions even further. Baffled by his remarks, Stephen's College and its students went on to apologise to Hansraj College and extended a hand of friendship.

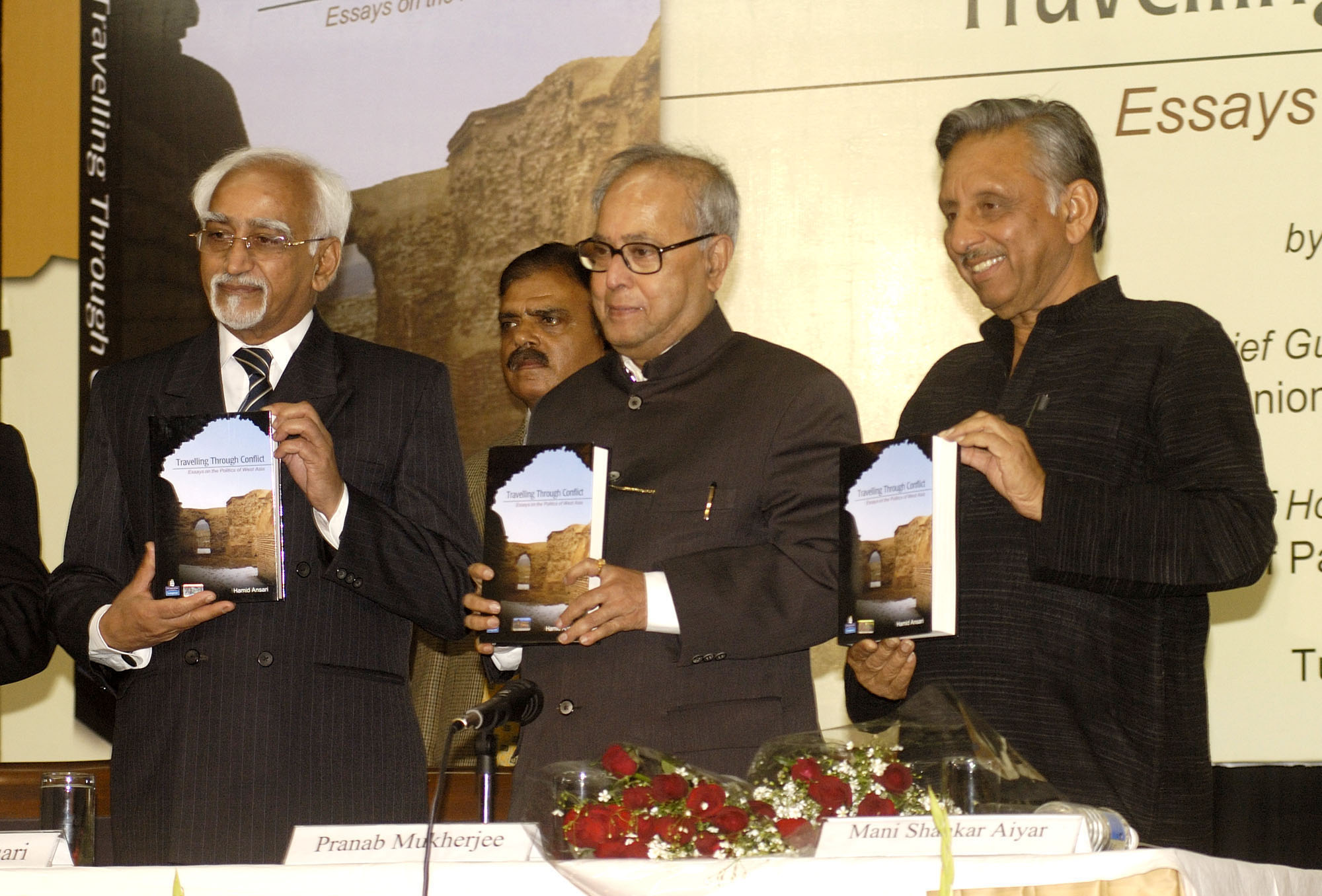
13th President of India Pranab Mukherjee releasing a book authored by 12th Vice-President of India Mohammad Hamid Ansari, in New Delhi on 2008.

He in an interview days before the run up to the 2014 Parliament elections in India, said that a tea seller (The Prime Ministerial candidate Narendra Modi of the BJP) can never become the Prime Minister of India, but can sell tea in AICC meetings. His comment was disowned by the Congress saying it's his personal view and not the party's view. Rahul Gandhi asked him not to make personal attacks.

Mani Shankar Aiyer justified the November 2015 Paris attacks as a response to France banning hijab. He also justified the Charlie Hebdo shooting as a backlash for the death of Muslims. His comments were disapproved by his own party members.

He sparked a political firestorm when he called Prime Minister Narendra Modi a "neech aadmi". Subsequently, he was temporarily suspended from the party's primary membership. Aiyar said the comments by the PM showed his "low-level mindset and one bereft of any manners". He further justified his remarks on Modi by adding "Yes, I called Modi 'neech' but did not mean it as a low-born; I meant it as low".

== Publications ==
Aiyar has written ten books:

- How To Be A Sycophant, NBS, New Delhi, 1990.
- Rajiv Gandhi: The Great Computer Scientist of India, Mughal Publishers, New Delhi, 1991.
- Remembering Rajiv, Rupa & Co., New Delhi, 1992.
- One Year in Parliament, Konark, New Delhi, 1993.
- Pakistan Papers, UBSPD, New Delhi, 1994.
- Knickerwallahs, Silly-Billies and Other Curious Creatures, UBS Publishers, 1995.
- Rajiv Gandhi's India, 4 vols. (General Editor), UBSPD New Delhi, 1997.
- Confessions of a Secular Fundamentalist, Penguin, 2004.
- A Time of Transition: Rajiv Gandhi to the 21st Century, Penguin, 2009.

Memoir Trilogy

- Memoirs of A Maverick : The First Fifty Years 1941-1991 - Juggernaut - 2023
- A Maverick in Politics 1991-2024 - Juggernaut -2023
- The Rajiv I Knew: And why He was India's Most Misunderstood Prime Minister - Juggernaut - 2024

Political offices
New title	Minister of Panchayati Raj; 2004–2009	Succeeded by C. P. Joshi
Preceded by Ram Naik	Minister of Petroleum and Natural Gas; 2004–2006	Succeeded by Murli Deora
