= Rama Ramanathan =

Indian politician

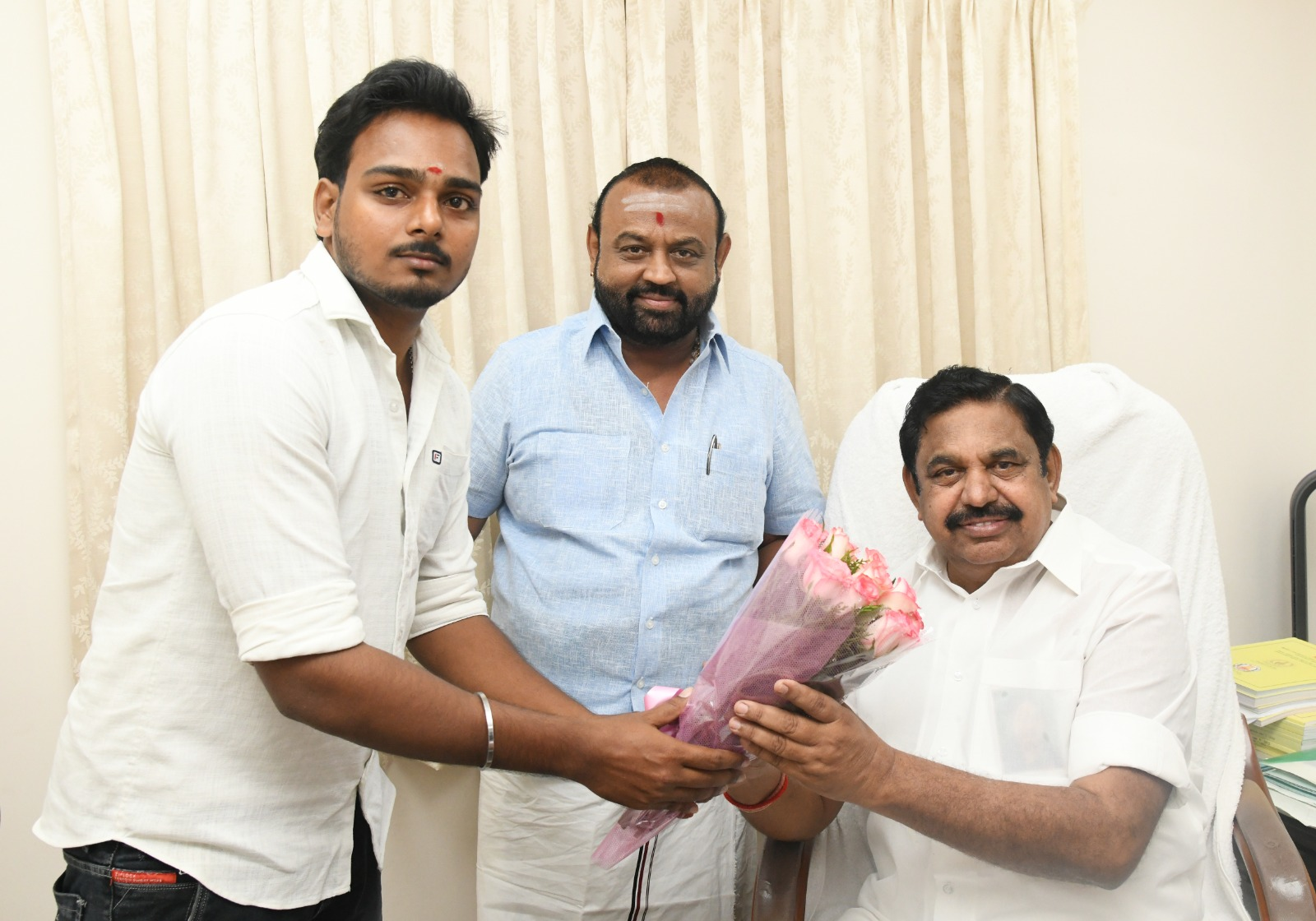
- Ramanathan standing behind AIADMK General Secretary Edappadi K. Palaniswami

Member of Tamil Nadu Legislative Assembly
- In office 1991–1996
- Preceded by: Ko. Si. Mani
- Succeeded by: Ko. Si. Mani
- Constituency: Kumbakonam

Personal details
- Born: 1964 (age 61–62)

Rama Ramanathan (born 1964) is an Indian politician from the All India Anna Dravida Munnetra Kazhagam who served as a Member of the Tamil Nadu Legislative Assembly for Kumbakonam from 1991 to 1996.He was a staunch loyalist of AIADMK Supremo J. Jayalalithaa. He contested and lost assembly elections from kumbakonam constituency under IADMKt in 1996, 2001, 2006,2011 elections. In 2011 he lost by a margin of 1000 votes to G.Anbalagan of DMK. He is Currently Kumbakonam Town Secretary of All India Anna Dravida Munnetra Kazhagam.
