= G. Anbalagan =

Indian politician

Sakkottai G. Anbalagan

Member of the Tamil Nadu Legislative Assembly
- In office 13 May 2011 – 4 May 2026
- Preceded by: Ko. Si. Mani
- Constituency: Kumbakonam

Personal details
- Party: Dravida Munnetra Kazhagam

Sakkottai G. Anbalagan is an Indian politician and former member of the Tamil Nadu Legislative Assembly from the Kumbakonam constituency. He represents the Dravida Munnetra Kazhagam party and was elected in elections of 2011 elections of 2016. and in the elections of 2021. He represents the Dravida Munnetra Kazhagam party. He won the 2021 assembly election with a margin of 21,383 votes against his opponent AIADMK candidate G.M. Srithar Vandayar.

== Electoral performance ==
2021 Tamil Nadu Legislative Assembly election: Kumbakonam
Party	Candidate	Votes	%	±%
DMK	G. Anbalagan	96,057	49.03%	▲3.99
AIADMK	G. M. Srithar Vandayar	74,674	38.12%	▼2.45
NTK	M. Anandh	12,480	6.37%	▲4.81
AMMK	S. Balamurugan	6,523	3.33%	New
MNM	G. Gopalakrishnan	5,276	2.69%	New
NOTA	Nota	1,648	0.84%	▼0.53
Independent	D. Gurumoorthi	234	0.12%	New
Independent	M. Ayyappan	209	0.11%	New
Independent	C. Vijayakumar	190	0.10%	New
Independent	P. Subramanian	153	0.08%	New
Independent	P. Prakash	120	0.06%	New
Margin of victory		21,383	10.91%	6.44%
Turnout		195,916	71.76%	−4.88%
Rejected ballots		76	0.04%	
Registered electors		273,029		
DMK hold		Swing	3.99%	

2016 Tamil Nadu Legislative Assembly election: Kumbakonam
Party	Candidate	Votes	%	±%
DMK	G. Anbalagan	85,048	45.04%	▼3.68
AIADMK	S. Rathna	76,591	40.56%	▼7.37
DMDK	D. Paramasivam	8,098	4.29%	New
PMK	K. Venkatraman	8,048	4.26%	New
NTK	Mani Senthil	2,937	1.56%	New
BJP	P. L. Annamalai	2,934	1.55%	▲0.56
NOTA	None Of The Above	2,593	1.37%	New
Independent	C. Vijayakumar	569	0.30%	New
TAVK	V. Arokkiya Raj	456	0.24%	New
BSP	T. Kalavathy	371	0.20%	▼0.25
Independent	R. Fathima	367	0.19%	New
Margin of victory		8,457	4.48%	3.69%
Turnout		188,827	76.64%	−3.92%
Registered electors		246,392		
DMK hold		Swing	-3.68%	

2011 Tamil Nadu Legislative Assembly election: Kumbakonam
Party	Candidate	Votes	%	±%
DMK	G. Anbalagan	78,642	48.72%	▼3.51
AIADMK	Rama Ramanathan	77,370	47.93%	▲7.02
BJP	P. L. Annamalai	1,606	0.99%	▼0.31
IJK	M. B. S. Dhasnamurthi	1,087	0.67%	New
BSP	G. Rajkumar	727	0.45%	▲0.03
Independent	S. Vijayalakshmi Kudanthi	649	0.40%	New
Independent	M. Panimayamaryraj	555	0.34%	New
Independent	R. Mohan	478	0.30%	New
Independent	P. Subramanian	294	0.18%	New
Margin of victory		1,272	0.79%	−10.52%
Turnout		200,372	80.55%	5.32%
Registered electors		161,408		
DMK hold		Swing	-3.51%	
