= K. Krishnamoorthy =

Indian politician (1944–2019)

Member of parliament, Lok Sabha for Mayiladuthurai
- In office 10 March 1998 – 26 April 1999
- Prime Minister: Atal Bihari Vajpayee
- Preceded by: P. V. Rajendran
- Succeeded by: Mani Shankar Aiyar

Personal details
- Born: July 1, 1944 Kumbakonam, India
- Died: January 16, 2019 (aged 74) Kumbakonam
- Party: TMC
- Children: 2

Krishnasamy Krishnamoorthy (1 July 1944 – 16 January 2019) was an Indian politician. He served as a Member of Lok Sabha from Mayiladuthurai from 1998 to 1999.

He was born on 1 July 1944 to Krishnasamy at Kumbakonam in India. He graduated in arts from Government College, Kumbakonam and qualified as a lawyer from Madras Law College.

== Politics ==
Krishnamoorthi served as a Member of the Tamil Nadu Legislative Assembly from 1984 to 1988. In 1998, he stood for election from Mayiladuthurai constituency for 12th Lok Sabha as a candidate of Tamil Maanila Congress and won over Pattali Makkal Katchi candidate by margin of 42,456 votes in which the election Mani Shankar Aiyar finished fourth and lost his deposit.
