= Kumbakonam Assembly constituency =

One of the 234 State Legislative Assembly Constituencies in Tamil Nadu, in India

Coordinates: 10.97°N 79.42°E

Kumbakonam
- Constituency No. 171 for the Tamil Nadu Legislative Assembly

Constituency details
- Country: India
- Region: South India
- State: Tamil Nadu
- District: Thanjavur
- Lok Sabha constituency: Mayiladuthurai
- Established: 1951
- Total electors: 254,383
- Reservation: None

Member of Legislative Assembly
- 17th Tamil Nadu Legislative Assembly
- Incumbent Vinoth
- Party: TVK
- Elected year: 2026

Kumbakonam is a state assembly constituency in Thanjavur district in Tamil Nadu. It is one of the 234 State Legislative Assembly Constituencies in Tamil Nadu, in India. Elections and winners in the constituency are listed below.

== Members of Legislative Assembly ==
| Year | Member | Political party |
Madras State
| 1952 | Varadan | Indian National Congress |
| 1957 | T. Sampath | Indian National Congress |
| 1962 | Ramaswami | Indian National Congress |
| 1967 | N. Kasiraman | Indian National Congress |
Tamil Nadu
| 1971 | N. Kasiraman | Indian National Congress (O) |
| 1977 | S. R. Radha | All India Anna Dravida Munnetra Kazhagam |
| 1980 | E. S. M. Pakeer Mhd. | Indian National Congress (I) |
| 1984 | K. Krishnamurthy | Indian National Congress |
| 1989 | Ko. Si. Mani | Dravida Munnetra Kazhagam |
| 1991 | Rama Ramanathan | All India Anna Dravida Munnetra Kazhagam |
| 1996 | Ko. Si. Mani | Dravida Munnetra Kazhagam |
| 2001 | Ko. Si. Mani | Dravida Munnetra Kazhagam |
| 2006 | Ko. Si. Mani | Dravida Munnetra Kazhagam |
| 2011 | G. Anbalagan | Dravida Munnetra Kazhagam |
| 2016 | G. Anbalagan | Dravida Munnetra Kazhagam |
| 2021 | G. Anbalagan | Dravida Munnetra Kazhagam |
| 2026 | Vinoth | Tamilaga Vettri Kazhagam |

== Election results ==
Vote share of winning candidates
| 2026 | 37.76% |
| 2021 | 49.03% |
| 2016 | 45.04% |
| 2011 | 48.72% |
| 2006 | 52.23% |
| 2001 | 51.18% |
| 1996 | 61.69% |
| 1991 | 65.15% |
| 1989 | 35.03% |
| 1984 | 64.57% |
| 1980 | 55.98% |
| 1977 | 32.52% |
| 1971 | 51.45% |
| 1967 | 50.63% |
| 1962 | 49.72% |
| 1957 | 48.65% |
| 1952 | 39.73% |

=== 2026 ===
2026 Tamil Nadu Legislative Assembly election: Kumbakonam
| Party | Candidate | Votes | % | ±% |
|---|---|---|---|---|
| TVK | Vinoth | 78,650 | 37.76 | New |
| DMK | Anbalagan G | 77,971 | 37.43 | ▼11.60 |
| BJP | Ashokkumar R | 40,103 | 19.25 | New |
| NTK | Anandh M | 7,710 | 3.70 | ▼2.67 |
| Independent | Stalin Ma Ka | 1,405 | 0.67 | New |
| NOTA | NOTA | 960 | 0.46 | ▼0.38 |
| Independent | Srinivasan V | 384 | 0.18 | New |
| Independent | Arivazhagan K | 241 | 0.12 | New |
| Thamizh Desiya Munnetra Kazhagam | Sundar G | 233 | 0.11 | New |
| TVK | Arokiyaraj V | 196 | 0.09 | New |
| Independent | Vijayakumar C | 173 | 0.08 | New |
| Independent | Karthi G | 90 | 0.04 | New |
| Independent | Ramamoorthi R | 89 | 0.04 | New |
| Independent | Senthamilselvi S | 83 | 0.04 | New |
| Margin of victory | | 679 | 0.33 | ▼10.58 |
| Turnout | | 2,08,288 | 81.88 | ▲10.12 |
| Registered electors | | 2,54,383 | | ▼18,646 |
| TVK gain from DMK | | Swing | ▲37.76 | |

=== 2021 ===
2021 Tamil Nadu Legislative Assembly election: Kumbakonam
| Party | Candidate | Votes | % | ±% |
|---|---|---|---|---|
| DMK | G. Anbalagan | 96,057 | 49.03% | ▲3.99 |
| AIADMK | G. M. Srithar Vandayar | 74,674 | 38.12% | ▼2.45 |
| NTK | M. Anandh | 12,480 | 6.37% | ▲4.81 |
| AMMK | S. Balamurugan | 6,523 | 3.33% | New |
| MNM | G. Gopalakrishnan | 5,276 | 2.69% | New |
| NOTA | Nota | 1,648 | 0.84% | ▼0.53 |
| Independent | D. Gurumoorthi | 234 | 0.12% | New |
| Independent | M. Ayyappan | 209 | 0.11% | New |
| Independent | C. Vijayakumar | 190 | 0.10% | New |
| Independent | P. Subramanian | 153 | 0.08% | New |
| Independent | P. Prakash | 120 | 0.06% | New |
| Margin of victory | | 21,383 | 10.91% | 6.44% |
| Turnout | | 195,916 | 71.76% | −4.88% |
| Rejected ballots | | 76 | 0.04% | |
| Registered electors | | 273,029 | | |
| DMK hold | | Swing | 3.99% | |

=== 2016 ===
2016 Tamil Nadu Legislative Assembly election: Kumbakonam
| Party | Candidate | Votes | % | ±% |
|---|---|---|---|---|
| DMK | G. Anbalagan | 85,048 | 45.04% | ▼3.68 |
| AIADMK | S. Rathna | 76,591 | 40.56% | ▼7.37 |
| DMDK | D. Paramasivam | 8,098 | 4.29% | New |
| PMK | K. Venkatraman | 8,048 | 4.26% | New |
| NTK | Mani Senthil | 2,937 | 1.56% | New |
| BJP | P. L. Annamalai | 2,934 | 1.55% | ▲0.56 |
| NOTA | None Of The Above | 2,593 | 1.37% | New |
| Independent | C. Vijayakumar | 569 | 0.30% | New |
| TAVK | V. Arokkiya Raj | 456 | 0.24% | New |
| BSP | T. Kalavathy | 371 | 0.20% | ▼0.25 |
| Independent | R. Fathima | 367 | 0.19% | New |
| Margin of victory | | 8,457 | 4.48% | 3.69% |
| Turnout | | 188,827 | 76.64% | −3.92% |
| Registered electors | | 246,392 | | |
| DMK hold | | Swing | -3.68% | |

=== 2011 ===
2011 Tamil Nadu Legislative Assembly election: Kumbakonam
| Party | Candidate | Votes | % | ±% |
|---|---|---|---|---|
| DMK | G. Anbalagan | 78,642 | 48.72% | ▼3.51 |
| AIADMK | Rama Ramanathan | 77,370 | 47.93% | ▲7.02 |
| BJP | P. L. Annamalai | 1,606 | 0.99% | ▼0.31 |
| IJK | M. B. S. Dhasnamurthi | 1,087 | 0.67% | New |
| BSP | G. Rajkumar | 727 | 0.45% | ▲0.03 |
| Independent | S. Vijayalakshmi Kudanthi | 649 | 0.40% | New |
| Independent | M. Panimayamaryraj | 555 | 0.34% | New |
| Independent | R. Mohan | 478 | 0.30% | New |
| Independent | P. Subramanian | 294 | 0.18% | New |
| Margin of victory | | 1,272 | 0.79% | −10.52% |
| Turnout | | 200,372 | 80.55% | 5.32% |
| Registered electors | | 161,408 | | |
| DMK hold | | Swing | -3.51% | |

=== 2006 ===
2006 Tamil Nadu Legislative Assembly election: Kumbakonam
| Party | Candidate | Votes | % | ±% |
|---|---|---|---|---|
| DMK | Ko. Si. Mani | 65,305 | 52.23% | ▲1.05 |
| AIADMK | Rama Ramanathan | 51,164 | 40.92% | ▼4.77 |
| DMDK | G. Devadoss (Kuppal) | 5,195 | 4.15% | New |
| BJP | R. Godhandaraman | 1,629 | 1.30% | New |
| Independent | R. Venkatramani | 824 | 0.66% | New |
| BSP | T. Ramakrishnan | 530 | 0.42% | New |
| SP | A. Sankara Narayanan | 391 | 0.31% | New |
| Margin of victory | | 14,141 | 11.31% | 5.82% |
| Turnout | | 125,038 | 75.24% | 15.01% |
| Registered electors | | 166,196 | | |
| DMK hold | | Swing | 1.05% | |

=== 2001 ===
2001 Tamil Nadu Legislative Assembly election: Kumbakonam
| Party | Candidate | Votes | % | ±% |
|---|---|---|---|---|
| DMK | Ko. Si. Mani | 60,515 | 51.18% | ▼10.51 |
| AIADMK | Rama Ramanathan | 54,019 | 45.69% | ▲15.18 |
| MDMK | R. Stalin | 1,480 | 1.25% | ▼1.59 |
| Independent | A. Jayasankar | 885 | 0.75% | New |
| Independent | Devados G Kuppal | 651 | 0.55% | New |
| Independent | P. Rethinakumar | 366 | 0.31% | New |
| Independent | N. Balakrishnan | 173 | 0.15% | New |
| Independent | K. Ganeshkumar | 153 | 0.13% | New |
| Margin of victory | | 6,496 | 5.49% | −25.69% |
| Turnout | | 118,242 | 60.23% | −8.79% |
| Registered electors | | 196,625 | | |
| DMK hold | | Swing | -10.51% | |

=== 1996 ===
1996 Tamil Nadu Legislative Assembly election: Kumbakonam
| Party | Candidate | Votes | % | ±% |
|---|---|---|---|---|
| DMK | Ko. Si. Mani | 69,849 | 61.69% | New |
| AIADMK | Rama Ramanathan | 34,539 | 30.51% | ▼34.64 |
| MDMK | V. Kaliaperumal | 3,221 | 2.84% | New |
| BJP | A. H. Nagaraj | 1,582 | 1.40% | ▲0.3 |
| Independent | G. Balasubramanian | 1,537 | 1.36% | New |
| Independent | Santhanaraman | 1,031 | 0.91% | New |
| Independent | T. Sankaran | 441 | 0.39% | New |
| Independent | N. Balakrishnan | 127 | 0.11% | New |
| Independent | Uppili Srinivasan | 112 | 0.10% | New |
| Independent | R. Krishna Kumar | 93 | 0.08% | New |
| Independent | V. Perumal | 81 | 0.07% | New |
| Margin of victory | | 35,310 | 31.19% | −3.98% |
| Turnout | | 113,224 | 69.02% | 2.61% |
| Registered electors | | 169,247 | | |
| DMK gain from AIADMK | | Swing | -3.46% | |

=== 1991 ===
1991 Tamil Nadu Legislative Assembly election: Kumbakonam
| Party | Candidate | Votes | % | ±% |
|---|---|---|---|---|
| AIADMK | Rama Ramanathan | 67,271 | 65.15% | ▲39.52 |
| JD | S. Kumarasamy | 30,962 | 29.99% | New |
| PMK | V. G. Ganesan | 2,971 | 2.88% | New |
| BJP | A. R. Sonraj | 1,137 | 1.10% | New |
| Independent | S. Ganesan | 377 | 0.37% | New |
| Independent | S. Asaimani | 157 | 0.15% | New |
| Independent | R. Kodimari | 121 | 0.12% | New |
| Independent | K. A. Umakathab | 104 | 0.10% | New |
| THMM | A. Jeevanandam | 86 | 0.08% | New |
| Independent | C. Shanmugam | 70 | 0.07% | New |
| Margin of victory | | 36,309 | 35.16% | 27.84% |
| Turnout | | 103,256 | 66.41% | −8.84% |
| Registered electors | | 160,229 | | |
| AIADMK gain from DMK | | Swing | 30.12% | |

=== 1989 ===
1989 Tamil Nadu Legislative Assembly election: Kumbakonam
| Party | Candidate | Votes | % | ±% |
|---|---|---|---|---|
| DMK | Ko. Si. Mani | 36,763 | 35.03% | ▲12.15 |
| INC | K. Krishnamurthy | 29,071 | 27.70% | ▼36.87 |
| AIADMK | S. H. Krishnamurthy | 26,906 | 25.63% | New |
| Independent | S. Kumarasamy | 11,919 | 11.36% | New |
| Independent | S. Murugaiyan | 127 | 0.12% | New |
| Independent | A. Gandhi | 110 | 0.10% | New |
| Independent | S. Rajasekekaran | 65 | 0.06% | New |
| Margin of victory | | 7,692 | 7.33% | −34.37% |
| Turnout | | 104,961 | 75.24% | −0.63% |
| Registered electors | | 141,644 | | |
| DMK gain from INC | | Swing | -29.55% | |

=== 1984 ===
1984 Tamil Nadu Legislative Assembly election: Kumbakonam
| Party | Candidate | Votes | % | ±% |
|---|---|---|---|---|
| INC | K. Krishnamurthy | 58,334 | 64.57% | ▲8.59 |
| DMK | S. Kaliyanasudaram | 20,666 | 22.88% | New |
| JP | R. Padmanthan | 9,027 | 9.99% | New |
| INC(J) | T. R. V. Jayaraman | 1,083 | 1.20% | New |
| Independent | K. Arumugam | 539 | 0.60% | New |
| Independent | P. Sowrirajan | 305 | 0.34% | New |
| Independent | S. Ayyappan | 215 | 0.24% | New |
| Independent | K. A. Alagarsamy | 171 | 0.19% | New |
| Margin of victory | | 37,668 | 41.70% | 29.73% |
| Turnout | | 90,340 | 75.88% | 6.82% |
| Registered electors | | 124,280 | | |
| INC hold | | Swing | 8.59% | |

=== 1980 ===
1980 Tamil Nadu Legislative Assembly election: Kumbakonam
| Party | Candidate | Votes | % | ±% |
|---|---|---|---|---|
| INC | E. S. M. Pakeer Mohamed | 45,038 | 55.98% | ▲27.13 |
| AIADMK | S. R. Eradha | 35,415 | 44.02% | ▲11.5 |
| Margin of victory | | 9,623 | 11.96% | 8.29% |
| Turnout | | 80,453 | 69.06% | −0.05% |
| Registered electors | | 118,130 | | |
| INC gain from AIADMK | | Swing | 23.46% | |

=== 1977 ===
1977 Tamil Nadu Legislative Assembly election: Kumbakonam
| Party | Candidate | Votes | % | ±% |
|---|---|---|---|---|
| AIADMK | S. R. Eradha | 26,432 | 32.52% | New |
| INC | O. Vadivelu Mazhavarayar | 23,450 | 28.85% | ▼22.6 |
| DMK | R. Durai | 17,460 | 21.48% | ▼26.58 |
| JP | C. R. Santhanam | 12,814 | 15.77% | New |
| Independent | K. Ramani | 1,116 | 1.37% | New |
| Margin of victory | | 2,982 | 3.67% | 0.28% |
| Turnout | | 81,272 | 69.10% | −9.71% |
| Registered electors | | 118,847 | | |
| AIADMK gain from INC | | Swing | -18.93% | |

=== 1971 ===
1971 Tamil Nadu Legislative Assembly election: Kumbakonam
| Party | Candidate | Votes | % | ±% |
|---|---|---|---|---|
| INC | N. Kasiraman | 39,755 | 51.45% | ▲0.82 |
| DMK | S. Padmananbhan | 37,136 | 48.06% | ▼0.94 |
| Independent | O. M. Irusappa Baktar | 374 | 0.48% | New |
| Margin of victory | | 2,619 | 3.39% | 1.77% |
| Turnout | | 77,265 | 78.81% | −2.89% |
| Registered electors | | 100,368 | | |
| INC hold | | Swing | 0.82% | |

=== 1967 ===
1967 Madras Legislative Assembly election: Kumbakonam
| Party | Candidate | Votes | % | ±% |
|---|---|---|---|---|
| INC | N. Kasiraman | 37,276 | 50.63% | ▲0.91 |
| DMK | K. S. Mani | 36,083 | 49.01% | ▲14.16 |
| Independent | M. L. Ramamoorthy | 268 | 0.36% | New |
| Margin of victory | | 1,193 | 1.62% | −13.26% |
| Turnout | | 73,627 | 81.70% | 2.92% |
| Registered electors | | 92,433 | | |
| INC hold | | Swing | 0.91% | |

=== 1962 ===
1962 Madras Legislative Assembly election: Kumbakonam
| Party | Candidate | Votes | % | ±% |
|---|---|---|---|---|
| INC | Ramaswami | 32,397 | 49.72% | ▲1.07 |
| DMK | Krishnamoorthy | 22,704 | 34.84% | New |
| SWA | Palanisami Chettiar | 6,074 | 9.32% | New |
| CPI | Kannaian | 3,677 | 5.64% | ▲0.85 |
| Independent | Irusappa Bakthar | 307 | 0.47% | New |
| Margin of victory | | 9,693 | 14.88% | −12.74% |
| Turnout | | 65,159 | 78.78% | 26.33% |
| Registered electors | | 85,256 | | |
| INC hold | | Swing | 1.07% | |

=== 1957 ===
1957 Madras Legislative Assembly election: Kumbakonam
| Party | Candidate | Votes | % | ±% |
|---|---|---|---|---|
| INC | T. Sampath | 22,613 | 48.65% | ▲8.92 |
| Independent | Neelamegham | 9,777 | 21.03% | New |
| Independent | Kasiraman | 5,550 | 11.94% | New |
| Independent | Sonu Rao | 4,229 | 9.10% | New |
| CPI | Ramasamy | 2,230 | 4.80% | ▼34.02 |
| Independent | Irusappan | 1,697 | 3.65% | New |
| Independent | Ramanatha Vanniar | 387 | 0.83% | New |
| Margin of victory | | 12,836 | 27.61% | 26.70% |
| Turnout | | 46,483 | 52.45% | −14.17% |
| Registered electors | | 88,621 | | |
| INC hold | | Swing | 8.92% | |

=== 1952 ===
1952 Madras Legislative Assembly election: Kumbakonam
| Party | Candidate | Votes | % | ±% |
|---|---|---|---|---|
| INC | Varadan | 21,175 | 39.73% | New |
| CPI | Somu Rao | 20,690 | 38.82% | New |
| Independent | Rathna Sabapathi Chettiyar | 8,485 | 15.92% | New |
| Akhil Bharat Hindu Maha Sabha | Sabbu Pillai | 1,558 | 2.92% | New |
| Socialist Party (India) | Thakku Rangaswami | 1,386 | 2.60% | New |
| Margin of victory | | 485 | 0.91% | |
| Turnout | | 53,294 | 66.62% | {{{change}}} |
| Registered electors | | 79,991 | | |
| INC win (new seat) | | | | |
