= S. Ganesan =

Indian politician

S. Ganesan was an Indian politician and former Member of the Legislative Assembly of Tamil Nadu. He was elected to the Tamil Nadu legislative assembly as a Dravida Munnetra Kazhagam candidate from Sembanarkoil constituency in 1967 election, from Kuttalam constituency in 1971 election and from Poompuhar constituency in 1977 election.
