= Vedaranyam Assembly constituency =

One of the 234 State Legislative Assembly Constituencies in Tamil Nadu, in India

Coordinates: 10°22′31″N 79°51′1″E

Vedaranyam
- Constituency No. 165 for the Tamil Nadu Legislative Assembly

Constituency details
- Country: India
- Region: South India
- State: Tamil Nadu
- District: Nagapattinam
- Lok Sabha constituency: Nagapattinam
- Established: 1962
- Total electors: 187,527
- Reservation: None

Member of Legislative Assembly
- 17th Tamil Nadu Legislative Assembly
- Incumbent O. S. Manian
- Party: AIADMK
- Alliance: NDA
- Elected year: 2026

Vedaranyam is a legislative assembly constituency in Nagapattinam district in the Indian state of Tamil Nadu. This constituency comprises Vedharanyam and Thalaignayiru Panchayat union. It is one of the 234 State Legislative Assembly Constituencies in Tamil Nadu, in India.

The most successful party is DMK, having won six times.

== Members of Legislative Assembly ==
Year	Member	Political party
Madras State
1962	N. S. Ramalingam	Indian National Congress
1967	Karuppampulam P. Venkatachala Thevar	Indian National Congress
Tamil Nadu
1971	M. Meenakshi Sundaram	Dravida Munnetra Kazhagam
1977|	M. Meenakshi Sundaram	Dravida Munnetra Kazhagam
1980	M. S. Manickam	All India Anna Dravida Munnetra Kazhagam
1984	M. Meenakshi Sundaram	Dravida Munnetra Kazhagam
1989	P. V. Rajendran	Indian National Congress
1991	P. V. Rajendran	Indian National Congress
1996	S. K. Vedarathinam	Dravida Munnetra Kazhagam
2001	S. K. Vedarathinam	Dravida Munnetra Kazhagam
2006	S. K. Vedarathinam	Dravida Munnetra Kazhagam
2011	N. V. Kamaraj	All India Anna Dravida Munnetra Kazhagam
2016	O. S. Manian	All India Anna Dravida Munnetra Kazhagam
2021	O. S. Manian	All India Anna Dravida Munnetra Kazhagam
2026	O. S. Manian	All India Anna Dravida Munnetra Kazhagam

== Election results ==
Vote share of winning candidates
2026	36.48%
2021	50.02%
2016	41.44%
2011	41.16%
2006	49.93%
2001	53.71%
1996	46.92%
1991	49.22%
1989	41.82%
1984	50.23%
1980	60.86%
1977	35.40%
1971	63.86%
1967	38.71%
1962	40.09%

=== 2026 ===
2026 Tamil Nadu Legislative Assembly election: Vedaranyam
Party	Candidate	Votes	%	±%
AIADMK	O. S. Manian	59,172	36.48	▼13.54
DMK	M. PugazhendI	51,841	31.96	▼10.22
TVK	A. Kingsly Gerald	38,347	23.64	New
NTK	T. Karthick	10,396	6.41	▲0.62
NOTA	NOTA	563	0.35	
Margin of victory		7,331	4.52	▼3.31
Turnout		1,62,216	86.50	▲4.81
Registered electors		1,87,527		▼5,131
AIADMK hold		Swing	▼13.54	

=== 2021 ===
2021 Tamil Nadu Legislative Assembly election: Vedaranyam
Party	Candidate	Votes	%	±%
AIADMK	O. S. Manian	78,719	50.02	+8.58
DMK	S. K. Vedarathinam	66,390	42.18	New
NTK	K. Rajendran	9,106	5.79	+4.84
AMMK	P. S. Arumugam	1,284	0.82	New
Margin of victory		12,329	7.83	−7.83
Turnout		157,387	81.69	0.27
Rejected ballots		185	0.12	
Registered electors		192,658		
AIADMK hold		Swing	8.58	

=== 2016 ===
2016 Tamil Nadu Legislative Assembly election: Vedaranyam
Party	Candidate	Votes	%	±%
AIADMK	O. S. Manian	60,836	41.44	+0.28
INC	P. V. Rajendiran	37,838	25.77	New
BJP	S. K. Vedarathinam	37,086	25.26	+24.3
DMDK	T. Vairavanathan	4,594	3.13	New
PMK	Usha Kannan	2,081	1.42	−16.12
NTK	K. Rajendran	1,386	0.94	New
NOTA	NOTA	1,206	0.82	New
Margin of victory		22,998	15.67	7.31
Turnout		146,803	81.42	−2.87
Registered electors		180,294		
AIADMK hold		Swing	0.28	

=== 2011 ===
2011 Tamil Nadu Legislative Assembly election: Vedaranyam
Party	Candidate	Votes	%	±%
AIADMK	N. V. Kamaraj	53,799	41.16	−3.86
Independent	S. K. Vedarathinam	42,871	32.80	New
PMK	R. Chinnathurai	22,925	17.54	New
Independent	K. Jegan	2,270	1.74	New
JMM	G. Shanmugavel	2,041	1.56	New
Independent	M. Rani	1,991	1.52	New
Independent	D. Ramsingh	1,826	1.40	New
BJP	S. Karthikeyan	1,260	0.96	+0.01
Independent	T. V. R. Veeramani	838	0.64	New
Margin of victory		10,928	8.36	3.45
Turnout		130,708	84.29	0.93
Registered electors		155,065		
AIADMK gain from DMK		Swing	-8.77	

=== 2006 ===
2006 Tamil Nadu Legislative Assembly election: Vedaranyam
Party	Candidate	Votes	%	±%
DMK	S. K. Vedarathinam	66,401	49.93	−3.78
AIADMK	O. S. Manian	59,870	45.02	New
DMDK	B. Veera Vinayagam	1,708	1.28	New
BJP	M. Udayakumar	1,267	0.95	New
SP	G. Mahendran	1,049	0.79	New
Independent	G. Vedarathinam	817	0.61	New
Margin of victory		6,531	4.91	−7.76
Turnout		132,984	83.37	9.19
Registered electors		159,520		
DMK hold		Swing	-3.78	

=== 2001 ===
2001 Tamil Nadu Legislative Assembly election: Vedaranyam
Party	Candidate	Votes	%	±%
DMK	S. K. Vedarathinam	63,568	53.71	+6.79
CPI	R. Mutharasan	48,568	41.04	New
MDMK	N. Ilangovan	3,678	3.11	−22.22
Independent	R. Ramamurthy	2,539	2.15	New
Margin of victory		15,000	12.67	−7.06
Turnout		118,353	74.18	−4.34
Registered electors		159,591		
DMK hold		Swing	6.79	

=== 1996 ===
1996 Tamil Nadu Legislative Assembly election: Vedaranyam
Party	Candidate	Votes	%	±%
DMK	S. K. Vedarathinam	54,185	46.92	+12.54
INC	P. C. V. Balasubramaniam	31,393	27.19	−22.04
MDMK	M. Meenakshi Sundaram	29,252	25.33	New
Margin of victory		22,792	19.74	4.90
Turnout		115,473	78.52	−3.98
Registered electors		154,906		
DMK gain from INC		Swing	-2.30	

=== 1991 ===
1991 Tamil Nadu Legislative Assembly election: Vedaranyam
Party	Candidate	Votes	%	±%
INC	P. V. Rajendran	55,957	49.22	+7.41
DMK	M. Meenakshi Sundaram	39,089	34.39	−2.24
PMK	M. Marimuthu Gounder	17,327	15.24	New
BJP	K. Subramaniam	889	0.78	New
Margin of victory		16,868	14.84	9.64
Turnout		113,679	82.49	2.83
Registered electors		141,246		
INC hold		Swing	7.41	

=== 1989 ===
1989 Tamil Nadu Legislative Assembly election: Vedaranyam
Party	Candidate	Votes	%	±%
INC	P. V. Rajendran	42,060	41.82	−7.13
DMK	M. Meenakshi Sundaram	36,836	36.62	−13.61
AIADMK	O. S. Manian	18,226	18.12	New
AIADMK	S. Kanagasunderam	2,460	2.45	New
Independent	P. Jayaraman	558	0.55	New
Margin of victory		5,224	5.19	3.91
Turnout		100,585	79.67	−8.64
Registered electors		127,781		
INC gain from DMK		Swing	-8.41	

=== 1984 ===
1984 Tamil Nadu Legislative Assembly election: Vedaranyam
Party	Candidate	Votes	%	±%
DMK	M. Meenakshi Sundaram	49,922	50.23	+12.24
INC	P. V. Rajendran	48,646	48.94	New
Independent	K. Veerasamy	822	0.83	New
Margin of victory		1,276	1.28	−21.58
Turnout		99,390	88.31	7.51
Registered electors		116,682		
DMK gain from AIADMK		Swing	-10.63	

=== 1980 ===
1980 Tamil Nadu Legislative Assembly election: Vedaranyam
Party	Candidate	Votes	%	±%
AIADMK	M. S. Manickam	52,311	60.86	+35.11
DMK	M. Meenakshi Sundaram	32,656	37.99	+2.59
JP	K. V. M. Subramania Gounder	988	1.15	New
Margin of victory		19,655	22.87	20.96
Turnout		85,955	80.79	−2.09
Registered electors		107,177		
AIADMK gain from DMK		Swing	25.46	

=== 1977 ===
1977 Tamil Nadu Legislative Assembly election: Vedaranyam
Party	Candidate	Votes	%	±%
DMK	M. Meenakshi Sundaram	29,601	35.40	−28.46
INC	S. Devarajan	28,009	33.50	+6.79
AIADMK	M. S. Manickam	21,530	25.75	New
JP	K. Gokilachandran	3,965	4.74	New
Independent	G. Venkatachalam	508	0.61	New
Margin of victory		1,592	1.90	−35.25
Turnout		83,613	82.89	0.71
Registered electors		101,857		
DMK hold		Swing	-28.46	

=== 1971 ===
1971 Tamil Nadu Legislative Assembly election: Vedaranyam
Party	Candidate	Votes	%	±%
DMK	M. Meenakshi Sundaram	41,787	63.86	+25.54
INC	P. C. Velayuthan	17,478	26.71	−12
CPI(M)	G. Raming	6,171	9.43	New
Margin of victory		24,309	37.15	36.76
Turnout		65,436	82.18	−4.60
Registered electors		87,223		
DMK gain from INC		Swing	25.15	

=== 1967 ===
1967 Madras Legislative Assembly election: Vedaranyam
Party	Candidate	Votes	%	±%
INC	P. V. Thevar	25,942	38.71	−1.38
DMK	M. Meenakshisundaram	25,678	38.32	+12.14
Independent	M. V. Gowndar	9,812	14.64	New
CPI	S. S. Pillai	5,584	8.33	−7.72
Margin of victory		264	0.39	−13.51
Turnout		67,016	86.77	5.97
Registered electors		81,342		
INC hold		Swing	-1.38	

=== 1962 ===
1962 Madras Legislative Assembly election: Vedaranyam
Party	Candidate	Votes	%	±%
INC	N. S. Ramalingam	27,200	40.09	New
DMK	N. Dharmalingam	17,764	26.18	New
CPI	R. Sellathurathevar	10,893	16.05	New
Independent	K. V. Veerappapillai	6,750	9.95	New
Independent	M. Vaithianathan	2,770	4.08	New
SWA	N. Samithuraithevar	2,475	3.65	New
Margin of victory		9,436	13.91	
Turnout		67,852	80.80	
Registered electors		87,047		
INC win (new seat)				
