= S. Ramalingam =

Member of the Indian Legislative Assembly

Member of Parliament, Lok Sabha
- In office 2019–2024
- Preceded by: R. K. Bharathi Mohan
- Succeeded by: R.Sudha
- Constituency: Mayiladuthurai

Personal details
- Born: 24 April 1945 (age 80) Srinivas, Tanjore, Madras Presidency, British India (now in Tamil Nadu, India)
- Party: Dravida Munnetra Kazhagam

Sellaperumal Ramalingam is an Indian politician belonging to the Dravida Munnetra Kazhagam.He was elected to the Lok Sabha, the lower house of the Parliament of India from Mayiladuthurai, Tamil Nadu in the 2019 Indian general election. He was earlier elected four times to the Tamil Nadu legislative assembly from Thiruvidamarudur constituency in 1977, 1980, 1989 and 1996 elections.
