= Govi. Chezhian =

Indian politician

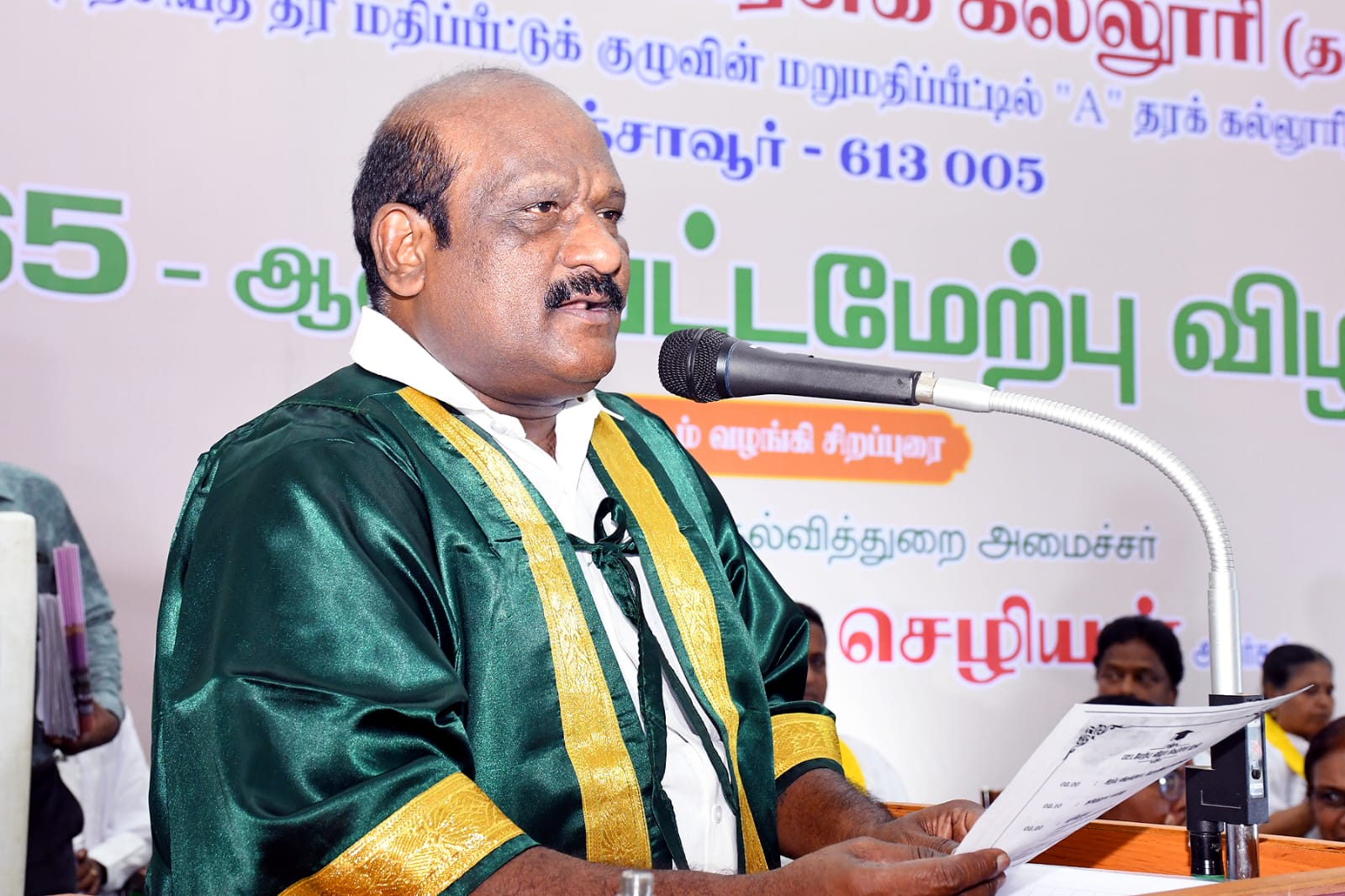

Minister of Higher Education Government of Tamil Nadu
- In office 28 September 2024 – 6 May 2026
- Chief Minister: M. K. Stalin
- Preceded by: K. Ponmudy
- Succeeded by: P. Viswanathan

Member of the Tamil Nadu Legislative Assembly
- Incumbent
- Assumed office 13 May 2011
- Preceding: R. K. Bharathi Mohan
- Constituency: Thiruvidamarudur

Personal details
- Born: Covi Chezhian; 13 May 1966 (age 60) Rajanganallur, Thanjavur district, Tamil Nadu India
- Party: Dravida Munnetra Kazhagam
- Occupation: Politician, lawyer

Govindan Nedunchezhian, popularly known as Govi. Chezhian is an Indian politician from the Dravida Munnetra Kazhagam party of Tamil Nadu. He is the State's incumbent Minister of Higher Education since September 2024. He has been representing the Thiruvidaimarudur constituency in the Tamil Nadu Legislative Assembly since May 2011. He also served as the Chief Government Whip in the Assembly from May 2021 till his elevation as Minister.
