= Yamini Aiyar =

Indian public policy researcher

- Education: University of Cambridge; St Stephen's College, Delhi; London School of Economics
- Occupation: Public policy specialist
- Years active: 2017–present
- Employer: Centre for Policy Research
- Title: Chief Executive and President at Centre for Policy Research (CPR India)
- Father: Mani Shankar Aiyar

Yamini Aiyar is an Indian author and social political commentator. She is the former president and chief executive of the Centre for Policy Research (CPR). She was appointed President of CPR in 2017. She was previously a senior research fellow and founder, in 2008, of the Accountability Initiative (AI) at the centre. Through Accountability Initiative, Yamini is credited with pioneering one of India's largest expenditure tracking surveys for elementary education. She is also regular columnist in newspapers, such as The Hindustan Times, LiveMint, and The Indian Express.

== Early life ==
Daughter of Congress leader Mani Shankar Aiyar, Yamini Aiyar did her Bachelor of Arts in philosophy at St. Stephen's College, Delhi and then an MA in social and political science at the University of Cambridge. She later studied at London School of Economics and was awarded Master of Science in development science from University of London.

== Career ==
Yamini's work sits at the intersection of research and policy practice. Her research interests span the fields of public finance, social policy, state capacity, federalism, governance and the study of contemporary politics in India. She has published widely in academic publications and the popular press, and writes regularly on current affairs and policy matters in mainstream Indian newspapers.

Yamini serves on a number of government and international policy committees as well as boards of nonprofits and think tanks. Her recent policy commitments include: commissioner and chair governance working group, Lancet Commission on Reimagining India's Health System; Member State Advisory Council, Government of Punjab, Member Technical Advisory Group, National Data and Analytics Platform, Niti Aayog.

Yamini Aiyar is a TED fellow, and a founding member of the International Experts Panel of the Open Government Partnership. She has also been a member of the World Economic Forum’s Global Council on Good Governance. Previously, she has worked with the World Bank’s Water and Sanitation Programme and Rural Development unit in Delhi, where she focussed on action research, aimed at strengthening mechanisms for citizen engagement in local government. Additionally, she was a member of the decentralisation team at the World Bank that provided policy support to strengthen Panchayati Raj (local governance) in India. Her analysis has often compared development and governance models in India and China, emphasizing the importance of empowering democratic local governments.

== Publications ==
Yamini's writings have appeared in multiple journals and edited volumes:

- 'Maximum Schemes, Minimum Welfare', in Re-forming India: The Nation Today, ed. Niraja Jayal Gopal.
- "Modi Consolidates Power: Leveraging Welfare Politics." Journal of Democracy, vol. 30 no. 4, 2019, p. 78-88.
- '“One nation,” BJP, and the future of Indian federalism,' with Louis Tillin, India Review, 19 May 2020.

Yamini is also actively involved in the preparation of annual Budget Briefs that are published by the Accountability Initiative. Using government reported data, the briefs analyse trends in allocations, public expenditures, outputs and outcomes of key social sector programmes. These briefs are published in the run-up to the Government of India budget in February every year.
