= M. Rajangam =

Indian politician

M. Rajangam (born 1939) is an Indian politician from the Indian National Congress, and was a member of the Tamil Nadu Assembly representing Thiruvidamarudur from 1984 to 1988. He was also the union chairman of Thiruvidamarudur.

He wrote an autobiography entitled Ninaivgulm Pagirvugulum. He maintains a website on Union Shipping Minister G. K. Varsan at gkvasan.in. He is the district leader for the Thanjavur Congress Party.
