= Kuttalam Assembly constituency =

One of the 234 State Legislative Assembly Constituencies in Tamil Nadu, in India

Coordinates: 11.1°N 79.55°E

Kuttalam
- Former constituency for the Tamil Nadu Legislative Assembly

Constituency details
- Country: India
- Region: South India
- State: Tamil Nadu
- District: Mayiladuthurai
- Established: 1967
- Abolished: 2008
- Total electors: 1,67,513

Kuttalam is a state assembly constituency in Mayiladuthurai district in Tamil Nadu. It is one of the 234 State Legislative Assembly Constituencies in Tamil Nadu, in India. Elections and winners in the constituency are listed below.

The constituency was disestablished in the year 2008.

== Members of the Legislative Assembly ==
Year	Winner	Party
1971	S. Ganesan	Dravida Munnetra Kazhagam
1977	R. Rajamanickam	Dravida Munnetra Kazhagam
1980	R. Rajamanickam	Dravida Munnetra Kazhagam
1984	Pappa Subramanian	All India Anna Dravida Munnetra Kazhagam
1989	R. Rajamanickam	Dravida Munnetra Kazhagam
1991	S. Asaimani	All India Anna Dravida Munnetra Kazhagam
1996	P. Kalayanam Kuttalam	Dravida Munnetra Kazhagam
2001	Natarajan	All India Anna Dravida Munnetra Kazhagam
2006	Anbazhagam Kuttalam	Dravida Munnetra Kazhagam

== Election results ==
=== 2006 ===
2006 Tamil Nadu Legislative Assembly election: Kuttalam
Party	Candidate	Votes	%	±%
DMK	Kuttalam K. Anbazhagan	66,841	51.77%	5.42%
AIADMK	S. Rajendran	55,236	42.78%	−5.86%
DMDK	K. Sarangambani	3,240	2.51%	
Independent	D. Malarvizhi	1,435	1.11%	
SP	R. Kathamuthu Sharma	905	0.70%	
BJP	T. Mohana Sundaram	813	0.63%	
BSP	R. Kudiyarasan	653	0.51%	
Margin of victory		11,605	8.99%	6.69%
Turnout		129,123	77.08%	8.06%
Registered electors		167,513		
DMK gain from AIADMK		Swing	3.12%	

=== 2001 ===
2001 Tamil Nadu Legislative Assembly election: Kuttalam
Party	Candidate	Votes	%	±%
AIADMK	Natarajan	55,921	48.64%	17.35%
DMK	P. Kalyanam	53,277	46.34%	−7.80%
MDMK	A. S. Mohan	2,054	1.79%	−4.81%
Independent	Ramadoss	1,585	1.38%	
Independent	G. Senthi Vasan	1,028	0.89%	
Independent	M. Dhakshinamoorthi	872	0.76%	
Independent	Anbalagan	228	0.20%	
Margin of victory		2,644	2.30%	−20.55%
Turnout		114,965	69.03%	−6.06%
Registered electors		166,639		
AIADMK gain from DMK		Swing	-5.50%	

=== 1996 ===
1996 Tamil Nadu Legislative Assembly election: Kuttalam
Party	Candidate	Votes	%	±%
DMK	P. Kalayanam Kuttalam	60,940	54.14%	18.52%
AIADMK	M. Rajendran	35,219	31.29%	−25.73%
PMK	Pappa Subramanian	8,267	7.34%	
MDMK	R. Rajamanickam	7,424	6.60%	
Independent	A. V. Murugan	139	0.12%	
Independent	C. Kaliaperumal	133	0.12%	
Independent	A. R. Sabarulla	77	0.07%	
Independent	S. Saminathan	74	0.07%	
Independent	A. Abdul Jaleel	70	0.06%	
Independent	D. Nacooran	66	0.06%	
Independent	Balasubramaniam	63	0.06%	
Margin of victory		25,721	22.85%	1.45%
Turnout		112,557	75.09%	0.26%
Registered electors		157,532		
DMK gain from AIADMK		Swing	-2.87%	

=== 1991 ===
1991 Tamil Nadu Legislative Assembly election: Kuttalam
Party	Candidate	Votes	%	±%
AIADMK	S.Asaimani	60,617	57.02%	41.17%
DMK	Ko. Si. Mani	37,866	35.62%	−11.95%
PMK	K. Kasinathan	7,036	6.62%	
THMM	A. Ramakrishanan	261	0.25%	
Independent	S. Saminathan	228	0.21%	
Independent	A. R. Sabarulla	222	0.21%	
Independent	Singara Muthusamy	85	0.08%	
Margin of victory		22,751	21.40%	−3.55%
Turnout		106,315	74.83%	−0.18%
Registered electors		148,950		
AIADMK gain from DMK		Swing	9.45%	

=== 1989 ===
1989 Tamil Nadu Legislative Assembly election: Kuttalam
Party	Candidate	Votes	%	±%
DMK	R. Rajamanickam	47,559	47.57%	4.23%
INC	S. Dhinakaran	22,609	22.61%	
AIADMK	N. Rethinam	15,843	15.85%	−39.78%
AIADMK	M. Rajendran	12,451	12.45%	−43.17%
Independent	M. Mailaiyan	869	0.87%	
Independent	C. Saminatha Odayar	245	0.25%	
Independent	K. Balu	243	0.24%	
Independent	C. Ramalinga Shatriyar	166	0.17%	
Margin of victory		24,950	24.95%	12.66%
Turnout		99,985	75.01%	−7.47%
Registered electors		135,941		
DMK gain from AIADMK		Swing	-8.06%	

=== 1984 ===
1984 Tamil Nadu Legislative Assembly election: Kuttalam
Party	Candidate	Votes	%	±%
AIADMK	Pappa Subbramanian	53,214	55.63%	
DMK	R. Rajamanickam	41,454	43.33%	−10.06%
Independent	Rama Sampath	621	0.65%	
INC(J)	V. Rajendran	376	0.39%	
Margin of victory		11,760	12.29%	−0.84%
Turnout		95,665	82.48%	7.87%
Registered electors		120,416		
AIADMK gain from DMK		Swing	2.24%	

=== 1980 ===
1980 Tamil Nadu Legislative Assembly election: Kuttalam
Party	Candidate	Votes	%	±%
DMK	R. Rajamanickam	44,254	53.39%	13.47%
CPI(M)	G. Veeraiyan	33,364	40.25%	11.03%
Independent	R. Idumpaiyan	5,274	6.36%	
Margin of victory		10,890	13.14%	2.44%
Turnout		82,892	74.61%	3.36%
Registered electors		112,552		
DMK hold		Swing	13.47%	

=== 1977 ===
1977 Tamil Nadu Legislative Assembly election: Kuttalam
Party	Candidate	Votes	%	±%
DMK	R. Rajamaniam	30,819	39.92%	−14.66%
CPI(M)	G. Veeraiyan	22,556	29.22%	
INC	V. Dhakshinamurthy Kalingaryar	19,666	25.47%	−9.92%
JP	Govindarajan Pon	3,924	5.08%	
Independent	A. B. Jaganatha Sharma	241	0.31%	
Margin of victory		8,263	10.70%	−8.48%
Turnout		77,206	71.26%	−9.69%
Registered electors		110,107		
DMK hold		Swing	-14.66%	

=== 1971 ===
1971 Tamil Nadu Legislative Assembly election: Kuttalam
Party	Candidate	Votes	%	±%
DMK	S. Ganesan	34,781	54.57%	
INC	K. K. Deen	22,554	35.39%	−7.08%
CPI(M)	C. Nataraja Pillai	5,886	9.24%	
Independent	M. Somasundaram	512	0.80%	
Margin of victory		12,227	19.18%	7.66%
Turnout		63,733	80.94%	−0.63%
Registered electors		81,421		
DMK gain from CPI(M)		Swing	0.58%	

=== 1967 ===
1967 Madras Legislative Assembly election: Kuttalam
Party	Candidate	Votes	%	±%
CPI(M)	G. B. Mohan	31,548	53.99%	
INC	M. Sivakadaksham	24,812	42.47%	
Independent	N. Subbaih	1,243	2.13%	
Independent	A. B. J. Sharma	825	1.41%	
Margin of victory		6,736	11.53%	
Turnout		58,428	81.58%	
Registered electors		76,359		
CPI(M) win (new seat)				
