= Thiruvidamarudur Assembly constituency =

One of the 234 State Legislative Assembly Constituencies in Tamil Nadu, in India

Coordinates: 11.00°N 79.45°E

Thiruvidamarudur
- Constituency No. 170 for the Tamil Nadu Legislative Assembly

Constituency details
- Country: India
- Region: South India
- State: Tamil Nadu
- District: Thanjavur
- Lok Sabha constituency: Mayiladuthurai
- Established: 1977
- Total electors: 257,014
- Reservation: SC

Member of Legislative Assembly
- 17th Tamil Nadu Legislative Assembly
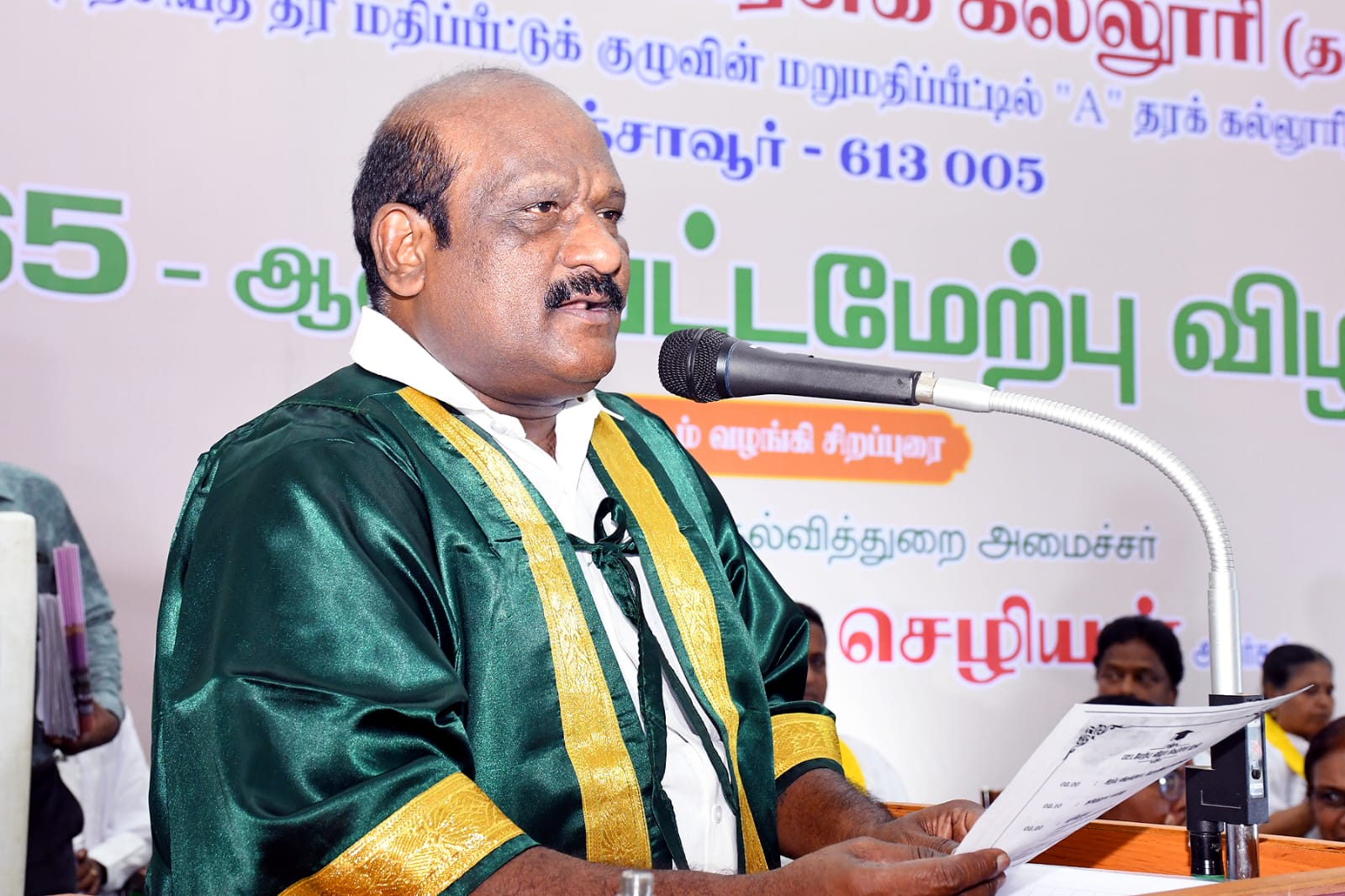
- Incumbent Govi. Chezhian
- Party: DMK
- Elected year: 2026

Thiruvidaimarudur is a state assembly constituency in Thanjavur district in Tamil Nadu. It is one of the 234 State Legislative Assembly Constituencies in Tamil Nadu, in India. Elections and winners in the constituency are listed below.

== Members of Legislative Assembly ==
Year	Winner	Party
1977	S. Ramalingam	Dravida Munnetra Kazhagam
1980	S. Ramalingam	Dravida Munnetra Kazhagam
1984	M. Rajangam	Indian National Congress
1989	S. Ramalingam	Dravida Munnetra Kazhagam
1991	N. Panneerselvam	Indian National Congress
1996	S. Ramalingam	Dravida Munnetra Kazhagam
2001	G. Thavamani	All India Anna Dravida Munnetra Kazhagam
2006	R. K. Bharathi Mohan	All India Anna Dravida Munnetra Kazhagam
2011	Govi. Chezhian	Dravida Munnetra Kazhagam
2016	Govi. Chezhian	Dravida Munnetra Kazhagam
2021	Govi. Chezhian	Dravida Munnetra Kazhagam
2026	Govi. Chezhian	Dravida Munnetra Kazhagam

== Election results ==
Vote share of winning candidates
2026	38.26%
2021	48.26%
2016	41.93%
2011	48.12%
2006	46.94%
2001	50.22%
1996	59.67%
1991	56.24%
1989	44.51%
1984	51.18%
1980	53.31%
1977	32.59%

=== 2026 ===
2026 Tamil Nadu Legislative Assembly election: Thiruvidamarudur
Party	Candidate	Votes	%	±%
DMK	Govi.Chezhiaan	79,951	38.26	▼10.00
TVK	S.Prabakaran	65,835	31.51	New
AIADMK	Elamathi Subramanian	52,922	25.33	▼17.54
NTK	M.Divya Bharathi	6,363	3.05	▼2.58
BSP	T.M.Puratchi Mani	1,043	0.50	▼0.43
NOTA	NOTA	747	0.36	▼0.26
Independent	P.Manikandan	588	0.28	New
CPI(ML)L	Kannaiyan.T	321	0.15	New
TVK	A.Viswanathan	273	0.13	New
Independent	Dhanasekar	266	0.13	New
Independent	L.Prabakaran	174	0.08	New
Independent	M.Tamilmaran	143	0.07	New
Independent	Selvarani.S	139	0.07	New
Independent	Keerthiga.K	95	0.05	New
Independent	Aravindaraj.R	84	0.04	New
Margin of victory		14,116	6.75	▲1.37
Turnout		2,08,944	81.30	▲4.81
Registered electors		2,57,014		▼2,415
DMK hold		Swing	▼10.00	

=== 2021 ===
2021 Tamil Nadu Legislative Assembly election: Thiruvidamarudur
Party	Candidate	Votes	%	±%
DMK	Govi. Chezhian	95,763	48.26%	+6.33
AIADMK	S. Union Veeramani	85,083	42.87%	+1.23
NTK	M. Divya Bharathi	11,176	5.63%	+4.85
BSP	M. Puratchi Mani	1,839	0.93%	New
AMMK	J. Kudanthai Arasan	1,746	0.88%	New
NOTA	NOTA	1,240	0.62%	−0.4
Margin of victory		10,680	5.38%	5.09%
Turnout		198,446	76.49%	−2.50%
Rejected ballots		146	0.07%	
Registered electors		259,429		
DMK hold		Swing	6.33%	

=== 2016 ===
2016 Tamil Nadu Legislative Assembly election: Thiruvidamarudur
Party	Candidate	Votes	%	±%
DMK	Govi. Chezhian	77,538	41.93%	−6.19
AIADMK	U. Settu	77,006	41.64%	−6.23
PMK	R. S. Madahaiyan	13,709	7.41%	New
VCK	S. Vivekanandan	10,622	5.74%	New
NOTA	NOTA	1,899	1.03%	New
NTK	R. Sulochana Devi	1,437	0.78%	New
BJP	S. Vasudevan	1,321	0.71%	New
Margin of victory		532	0.29%	0.04%
Turnout		184,929	78.99%	−2.56%
Registered electors		234,108		
DMK hold		Swing	-6.19%	

=== 2011 ===
2011 Tamil Nadu Legislative Assembly election: Thiruvidamarudur
Party	Candidate	Votes	%	±%
DMK	Govi. Chezhian	77,175	48.12%	New
AIADMK	T. Pandiyarajan	76,781	47.87%	+0.93
Independent	Kudanthai Arasan	1,646	1.03%	New
Independent	S. Ravi Chandran	1,253	0.78%	New
BSP	K. Rajavelu	902	0.56%	New
Independent	A. Elangovan	819	0.51%	New
Margin of victory		394	0.25%	−2.55%
Turnout		160,392	81.56%	4.55%
Registered electors		196,663		
DMK gain from AIADMK		Swing	1.17%	

=== 2006 ===
2006 Tamil Nadu Legislative Assembly election: Thiruvidamarudur
Party	Candidate	Votes	%	±%
AIADMK	R. K. Bharathi Mohan	63,231	46.94%	−3.27
PMK	G. Alayamani	59,463	44.14%	New
DMDK	G. Sankar	5,261	3.91%	New
Independent	K. Vasudevan	2,014	1.50%	New
Independent	H. Ansar Ali	1,127	0.84%	New
SP	S. Elango	1,059	0.79%	New
BJP	B. Sowrirajan	806	0.60%	New
Margin of victory		3,768	2.80%	−3.25%
Turnout		134,700	77.01%	3.99%
Registered electors		174,917		
AIADMK hold		Swing	-3.27%	

=== 2001 ===
2001 Tamil Nadu Legislative Assembly election: Thiruvidamarudur
Party	Candidate	Votes	%	±%
AIADMK	G. Thavamani	61,235	50.22%	New
DMK	S. Ramalingam	53,863	44.17%	−15.5
MDMK	R. Murugan	4,172	3.42%	−0.54
Independent	P. G. Ramalingam	1,519	1.25%	New
CPI(ML)L	T. K. S. Janardhanan	1,153	0.95%	+0.42
Margin of victory		7,372	6.05%	−29.45%
Turnout		121,942	73.02%	−1.71%
Registered electors		167,543		
AIADMK gain from DMK		Swing	-9.45%	

=== 1996 ===
1996 Tamil Nadu Legislative Assembly election: Thiruvidamarudur
Party	Candidate	Votes	%	±%
DMK	S. Ramalingam	70,500	59.67%	+26.03
INC	T. R. Loganathan	28,559	24.17%	−32.07
PMK	G. Alayamani	9,506	8.05%	New
MDMK	R. Murugan	4,684	3.96%	New
Independent	K. Gandhimathi	3,168	2.68%	New
CPI(ML)L	T. Kannaiyan	622	0.53%	New
Margin of victory		41,941	35.50%	12.89%
Turnout		118,155	74.73%	0.13%
Registered electors		166,439		
DMK gain from INC		Swing	3.42%	

=== 1991 ===
1991 Tamil Nadu Legislative Assembly election: Thiruvidamarudur
Party	Candidate	Votes	%	±%
INC	N. Panneer Selvam	62,523	56.24%	+31.61
DMK	S. Ramalingam	37,392	33.64%	−10.88
PMK	G. Kesavan	10,035	9.03%	New
Margin of victory		25,131	22.61%	2.73%
Turnout		111,163	74.60%	0.93%
Registered electors		153,316		
INC gain from DMK		Swing	11.73%	

=== 1989 ===
1989 Tamil Nadu Legislative Assembly election: Thiruvidamarudur
Party	Candidate	Votes	%	±%
DMK	S. Ramalingam	44,914	44.51%	+7.12
INC	M. Rajangam	24,857	24.64%	−26.54
AIADMK	K. Ramalingam	12,434	12.32%	New
Independent	A. Asaithambi	10,416	10.32%	New
AIADMK	A. C. Chitrarasu	7,247	7.18%	New
Margin of victory		20,057	19.88%	6.10%
Turnout		100,898	73.67%	−8.06%
Registered electors		139,862		
DMK gain from INC		Swing	-6.66%	

=== 1984 ===
1984 Tamil Nadu Legislative Assembly election: Thiruvidamarudur
Party	Candidate	Votes	%	±%
INC	M. Rajangam	50,002	51.18%	New
DMK	S. Ramalingam	36,539	37.40%	−15.91
Independent	P. Sowrirajan	11,163	11.43%	New
Margin of victory		13,463	13.78%	7.16%
Turnout		97,704	81.73%	5.91%
Registered electors		124,072		
INC gain from DMK		Swing	-2.13%	

=== 1980 ===
1980 Tamil Nadu Legislative Assembly election: Thiruvidamarudur
Party	Candidate	Votes	%	±%
DMK	S. Ramalingam	46,943	53.31%	+20.72
AIADMK	K. Rajamaniekam	41,111	46.69%	+16.87
Margin of victory		5,832	6.62%	4.37%
Turnout		88,054	75.82%	4.15%
Registered electors		118,003		
DMK hold		Swing	20.72%	

=== 1977 ===
1977 Tamil Nadu Legislative Assembly election: Thiruvidamarudur
Party	Candidate	Votes	%	±%
DMK	S. Ramalingam	26,304	32.59%	New
INC	K. Govindarajulu	24,489	30.34%	New
AIADMK	M. C. Mahalingam	24,067	29.82%	New
JP	N. G. Rangarajan	3,018	3.74%	New
Independent	K. Nedunchezhian	2,053	2.54%	New
Independent	M. G. Mani	781	0.97%	New
Margin of victory		1,815	2.25%	
Turnout		80,712	71.67%	
Registered electors		114,391		
DMK win (new seat)				
