= Vidya Shankar Aiyar =

Indian journalist

Vidya Shankar Aiyar is an Indian convicted sex offender and journalist.

== Career ==
He was honorary adviser to the Indian PM's nuclear disarmament group from 2011 to 2014. He was the India Coordinator of the Parliamentarians for Nuclear Nonproliferation and Disarmament (PNND), and part of the Abolition 2000 network. He was associated with the International Campaign to Abolish Nuclear Weapons (ICAN). Aiyar successfully lobbied the Indian government to attend global anti-nuclear conferences in Oslo, Nayarit and Vienna. At the Vienna conference, Aiyar succeeded in making a presentation at the Austrian parliament, seeking its support to reverse Austria’s negative vote at the UN on India’s offer of a treaty prohibiting any use of nuclear weapons.

Aiyar obtained a doctorate on the breakup of the Soviet Union from Jawaharlal Nehru University in 1997. He led the first-ever South Asian team to the Harvard Project for Asian and International Relations. A Rockefeller Foundation 'Next Generation Strategic Analyst' (1988), he writes and speaks globally on these issues.

Aiyar was the executive editor and prime time anchor of CNN IBN (CNN-News18) in India. He hosted the Real India Travel Show on the BBC, and began Indian TV’s first popular chat show, the Eyewitness Chat Show, with Karan Thapar.

Aiyar previously worked as an anchor for Channel NewsAsia (CNA) in Singapore. He became the only Indian TV journalist to have interviewed both then Indian PM Vajpayee and Pakistan Chief Executive, Gen Pervez Musharraf. It was PM Vajpayee’s only TV interview given to an Indian.

== Sexual assault conviction ==
In the case of Public Prosecutor v Vidya Shankar Aiyar [2003] SGDC 327, Aiyar was convicted by the State Courts of Singapore for raping an intoxicated woman. Aiyar was sentenced to 16 months in prison and four strokes of the cane, with the court describing him as a "hunting wolf in sheep's clothing". The trial was covered by leading news outlets in Singapore, Malaysia and India. Following an appeal to the President of Singapore, Aiyar managed to avoid the caning on medical grounds and his prison term was eventually reduced on grounds of good behaviour. Aiyar's counsel, the well-known Singaporean criminal lawyer Subhas Anandan, later stated that Aiyar's family members had "acted like royalty" and threatened the Singaporean authorities that a harsh sentence could "jeopardise" relations between Singapore and India.

== Personal life ==
Aiyar is the nephew of the Indian politician Mani Shankar Aiyar.
