= Sudha Ramakrishnan =

Indian politician

R Sudha

Member of Parliament, Lok Sabha
- Incumbent
- Assumed office 4 June 2024
- Preceded by: S. Ramalingam
- Constituency: Mayiladuthurai

Personal details
- Born: July 27, 1977 (age 49) Gummidipoondi, Tamil Nadu, India
- Party: Indian National Congress
- Occupation: Politician

Sudha Ramakrishnan is an Indian politician. She was elected to the Lok Sabha, lower house of the Parliament of India from Mayiladuthurai, Tamil Nadu in the 2024 Indian general election as member of the Indian National Congress.

Sudha was present among the Opposition members during protests in the Lok Sabha in the 2026 Budget Session, during which members entered the well and displayed placards near the front benches, including the area of the Prime Minister’s seat, leading to disruptions and adjournment of the House.
