= R. Rajamanickam =

Indian politician

R. Rajamanickam was an Indian politician and former Member of the Legislative Assembly of Tamil Nadu. He was elected to the Tamil Nadu legislative assembly from Kuttalam constituency as a Dravida Munnetra Kazhagam candidate in 1977, 1980, and 1989 elections.
