= O. S. Manian =

Indian politician

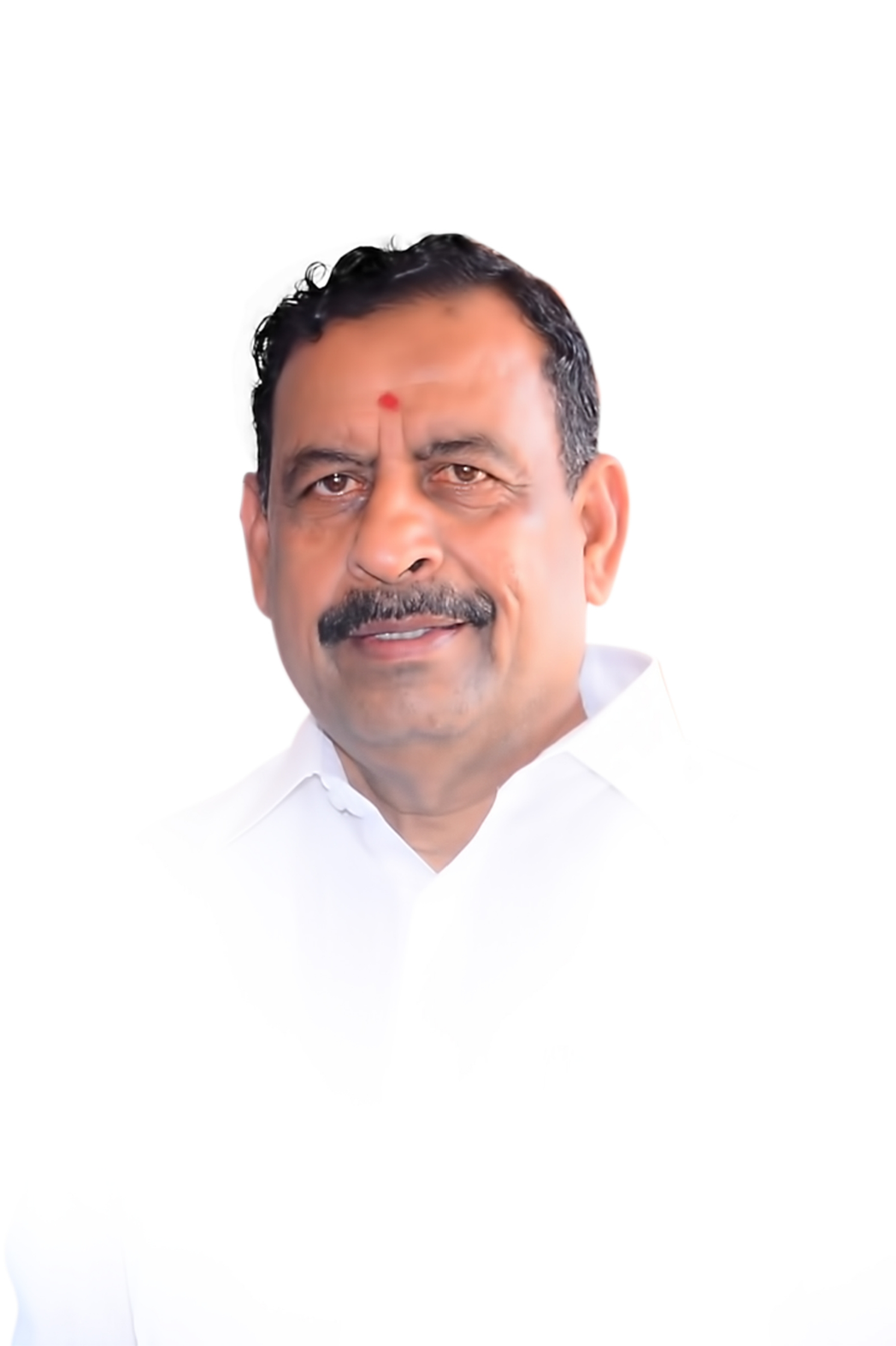

Member of the Tamil Nadu Legislative Assembly
- Incumbent
- Assumed office 16 May 2016
- Preceded by: N. V. Kamaraj
- Constituency: Vedaranyam

Member of Parliament, Lok Sabha
- In office 16 May 2009 – 16 May 2014
- Preceded by: Mani Shankar Aiyar
- Succeeded by: R. K. Bharathi Mohan
- Constituency: Mayiladuthurai

Member of Parliament, Rajya Sabha
- In office 25 July 1995 – 24 July 2001
- Constituency: Tamil Nadu

Personal details
- Born: 29 April 1954 (age 72) Oradiyampulam, Madras Presidency, India (presently Nagapattinam District, Tamil Nadu)
- Party: All India Anna Dravida Munnetra Kazhagam
- Spouse: Kalaiselvi
- Children: 2 (Daughters) OSM Bharathi OSM Vasugi
- Parent(s): Somuthevar (father) & Kasambuammal (mother)
- Education: P.U.C. (Class XII)
- Alma mater: Khadir Mohideen College, Adirampattinam, Tamil Nadu
- Occupation: Politician & Agriculturist

Oradiyampulam Somuthevar Manian, popularly known as O. S. Manian, is a member of the 15th Tamil Nadu Legislative Assembly from Vedaranyam constituency, Nagapattinam district. He is a staunch loyalist to the late AIADMK Supremo J. Jayalalithaa. He previously represented the Mayiladuthurai (Lok Sabha constituency) of Tamil Nadu and is a member of the All India Anna Dravida Munnetra Kazhagam political party.

J Jayalalithaa appointed O.S Manian as Minister for Handlooms and Textiles in May 2016. This was his first cabinet post in the Government of Tamil Nadu.

He has been interested in politics and public interest since his youth. From the age of 18 he joined the All India Anna Dravida Munnetra Kazhagam.

Later, he held many party responsibilities such as Union Secretary, Club Policy Propagation Secretary, District Club Secretary.

== Education and background ==
Manian has completed formal education only till XII standard. An agriculturist by profession, he has held various political offices since 1995. Manian belongs to the Agamudayar community and currently serves as the AIADMK District Secretary for Nagapattinam.

== Posts held ==
#	From	To	Position
1	1995	2001	Member, Rajya Sabha
2	2009	2014	Member, 15th Lok Sabha
3	31 Aug 2009	30 April 2014	Member, Committee on Commerce
4	31 Aug 2009	30 April 2014	Member, Committee on Power
5	23 Sep 2009	30 April 2014	Member, Rules Committee
6	2016	23 May 2016–present	Member, Tamil Nadu Legislative Assembly
7	2016	23 May 2016 – 2021	Minister for Handlooms and Textiles
8	2021	June 2022	Member, Estimate committee

== Electoral performance ==
=== Legislative Assembly ===
Year	Constituency	Party	Votes	%	Opponent	Party	Votes	%	Result	Margin	%
2026	Vedaranyam	ADMK	59,172	36.48	M. Pugazhendi	DMK	51,841	31.96	Won	+7,331	+4.52
2021	Vedaranyam	ADMK	78,719	50.02	S. K. Vedarathinam	DMK	66,390	42.18	Won	+12,329	+7.84
2016	Vedaranyam	ADMK	60,836	41.44	P. V. Rajendiran	INC	37,838	25.77	Won	+22,998	+15.67
2006	Vedaranyam	ADMK	59,870	45.02	S. K. Vedarathinam	DMK	66,401	49.93	Lost	-6,531	-4.91
1989	Vedaranyam	ADMK	18,226	18.12	P. V. Rajendiran	INC	42,060	41.82	Lost	-23,834	-23.70

=== Lok Sabha ===
Year	Constituency	Party	Votes	%	Opponent	Party	Votes	%	Result	Margin	%
2009	Mayiladuthurai	ADMK	3,64,089	45.60	Mani Shankar Aiyar	INC	3,27,235	40.98	Won	+36,854	+4.62
2004	Mayiladuthurai	ADMK	2,15,469	30.97	Mani Shankar Aiyar	INC	4,11,160	59.11	Lost	-1,95,691	-28.14
