= R. K. Bharathi Mohan =

Indian politician

Member of Parliament, Lok Sabha
- In office 1 September 2014 – 23 May 2019
- Preceded by: Mani Shankar Aiyer
- Succeeded by: S. Ramalingam
- Constituency: Mayiladuthurai

Member of Tamil Nadu Legislative Assembly
- In office 11 May 2006 — 13 May 2011
- Preceded by: G. Thavamani
- Succeeded by: Govi. Cheziyan
- Constituency: Thiruvidaimarudhur

Personal details
- Born: 12 June 1967 (age 58) Kumbakonam, Thanjavur, Tamil Nadu
- Party: All India Anna Dravida Munnetra Kazhagam
- Spouse: Smt. B. Rajammal
- Children: 2
- Occupation: Agriculturist
- As of 17 December, 2016

R K Bharathi Mohan (12/06/67) is an Indian politician and Member of Parliament elected from Tamil Nadu. He is elected to the Lok Sabha from Mayiladuthurai constituency as an Anna Dravida Munnetra Kazhagam candidate in 2014 election.

He was member of Tamil Nadu Assembly from Thiruvidamarudur (State Assembly Constituency) during 2006–2011.
