= Bairavanathar Temple, Thagattur =

Temple in Tamil Nadu, India

Bairavanathar Temple is a Hindu temple dedicated to the deity Shiva, located at Thagattur in Nagapattinam district in Tamil Nadu, India.

== Vaippu Sthalam ==
It is one of the shrines of the Vaippu Sthalams sung by Tamil Saivite Nayanar Sundarar.

== Presiding deity ==
Bhairava, the presiding deity in the garbhagriha is represented by the lingam known as Bairavanathar and Sivalokanathar. The Goddess is known as Sivakamasundari. In Abithana Sinthamani there is reference about Bhairava. An asura did penance and got a boon from Shiva, that he would be killed but only a woman. He thought that a woman would not kill him. He started disturbing one and all. Shiva created a woman and named her as Kali, and the asura was killed by Kali.

== Specialities ==
As Bhairava is found in the main shrine, this temple is known as Bairavanathar Temple. This is the only temple having Bhairava in the main shrine. After the annihilation of Ravana in Sri Lanka, in order to get relieved from the ill wills Rama wanted to do puja to Shiva. So he sent Hanuman to Kasi. When Hanuman came from there, Bhairava accompanied him. As he came for protection to the linga from Kasi, he wanted to halt in Thagattur itself. As a chakra is placed in this temple, this place is also known as yantrapuri. Sattainathar sculpture is also found in the shrine.

== Structure ==
As this Bhairava came with Hanuman, Kasi Visvanathar and Visalakshi are found here. Shrines of Ganesha, Subramania with his consorts Valli, Durga and Chandikesvarar are found in this temple. Temple tank is found near the temple.

== Location ==
Thagattur is located at Thiruthuraipoondi-Vedaranyam road, next to Vaimedu.
