= P. Kalayanam Kuttalam =

Indian politician

P. Kalayanam Kuttalam was elected to the Tamil Nadu Legislative Assembly from the Kuttalam constituency in the 1996 elections. He was a candidate of the Dravida Munnetra Kazhagam (DMK) party.
