= N. V. Kamaraj =

Indian politician

N. V. Kamaraj (born 21 May 1963) is an Indian politician and was a member of the 14th Tamil Nadu Legislative Assembly from the Vedaranyam constituency. He represented the All India Anna Dravida Munnetra Kazhagam (AIADMK) party.

Kamaraj did not receive a nomination as an AIADMK candidate in the 2016 state assembly elections, with the party favouring that his constituency should be contested by O. S. Manian. He was expelled from the party in July 2016 and in October he joined the Dravida Munnetra Kazhagam, claiming that the AIADMK leadership was inaccessible and that he had been unable to explain allegations that had been made against him while an AIADMK member.

== Personal life ==
Kamaraj was born on 21 May 1963 in Vedaranyam. He is married and has two children.
