= Thagattur Pethachikadu =

- Village
- Location in Tamil Nadu, India Thagattur Pethachikadu (India)
- Coordinates: 10.4309°N 79.7065°E
- Country: India
- State: Tamil Nadu
- District: Nagapattinam

Population (2011)
  - Total: 2,164

Languages
  - Official: Tamil
- Time zone: UTC+5:30 (IST)
- PIN: 614714

Thagattur Pethachikadu is a Panchayat village in Vedaranyam Taluk, Nagapattinam District, Tamil Nadu, India.

== Educational institutions ==
- Government Higher Secondary School (GHSS)

== See also ==
- Bairavanathar Temple, Thagattur
