= M. Meenakshi Sundaram =

Indian politician

A.K.M. Meenakshi Sundaram (Born 1947) was an Indian politician, and former Member of the Legislative Assembly of Tamil Nadu. He was the district secretary of East Thanjavur District from 1971 to 1991. He was the Ex district secretary of Nagapattinam and was elected to the Tamil Nadu legislative assembly as a Dravida Munnetra Kazhagam candidate from Vedaranyam constituency in 1971, 1977 and 1984 elections. He was a floor president for Nagapattinam South DMK.
