= E. S. M. Packeer Mohamed =

Indian politician

E.S.M. Packeer Mohamed is an Indian politician. He belongs to the Indian National Congress party, was elected Member of Legislative Assembly in 1980-1984 and Member of Parliament, Lok Sabha in 1984-1989 from Mayiladuthurai (Lok Sabha constituency), Tamil Nadu.

== Early life ==
Mohamed is a son of Janab E.Sheik Mydeen Rowther, and was born in Kumbakonam, Thanjavur on 28 April 1937. He was educated at Native Matric High School, Kumbakonam, Tamil Nadu. He married Razya Banu on 21 January 1960, they have one son and three daughters.

== Previous association with political parties ==
He was President of Congress in Kumbakonam, Tamil Nadu from 1967 to 1970

== Previous membership ==
Eighth Lok Sabha in 1984–89; Legislative Assembly, Tamil Nadu in 1980–84;

== Committee experience ==
Member of Consultative Committee, Ministry of Finance, 1985–89, Ministry of Surface Transport, 1990;

== Delegation to foreign countries ==
Member of Government of India Haj Goodwill Mission to Mecca and Medina;

== Social activities ==
President of Mydeen Memorial Charitable Association, Kumbakonam; President of District Muslim Education Society, Thanjavur.

== Other information ==
Vice-president, Mylapore Academy, Madras, Correspondent of Native H.S. School, Kumbakonam and Mydeen Matriculation School, Memberof Indian Cashewnut Development Council, 1986–89.
