= Ko. Si. Mani =

Indian politician

Member of the Tamil Nadu Legislative Assembly
- In office 6 February 1989 — 15 May 2011
- Constituency: Kumbakonam

Personal details
- Born: 13 September 1929 Mekkirimangalam, Mayiladuthurai district, Tamil Nadu
- Died: 2 December 2016 (aged 87) Kumbakonam, Tamil Nadu
- Children: Mathialagan, Indrani, Manimegalai, Pushpa (deceased)

Ko.Si. Mani (13 September 1929 – 2 December 2016) was an Indian politician who was the minister for co-operation, statistics and ex-servicemen in the Tamil Nadu state of India between 2006 and 2011 Dravida Munnetra Kazhagam (DMK) regime. He was instrumental in developing kumbakonam fisheries market and darasuram vegetable market.

== Personal life ==
Mani was born on 13 September 1929 in Mekkirimangalam. He received school education till 9th standard. He had a son named Mathialagan and daughters named Indraani, Manimegalai and Pushpa. Pushpa died on 29 June 2008.

Mani died on 2 December 2016.

== Political career ==
Mani was one of the long-standing members of Dravida Munnetra Kazhagam. He was elected to the legislative assembly five times and legislative council twice. He was also the first DMK MLA to be elected in Kumbakonam, since that region has been dominated by Congress leaders until 1989.

He was elected to the Tamil Nadu legislative assembly from Kumbakonam constituency as a Dravida Munnetra Kazhagam candidate in 1989, 1996, 2001 and 2006 elections.

== Corruption Charges ==
During Jayalalitha's rule in Tamil Nadu, Directorate of Vigilance and Anti-Corruption filed charges against him on 20 May 2003 in connection with disproportionate accumulation of wealth during his tenure as a Local Administration Minister in the previous assembly. The Directorate registered a case against Mani and his second wife under Section 13 (1) (e) read with 13 (2) of the Prevention of Corruption Act and Section 109 IPC.

== Tamaraikani attack ==
Mani was accused along with The Marumalarchi Dravida Munnetra Kazhagam general secretary, Vaiko and the Communist Party of India leader, K. Idumbaiyan, in a case of alleged assault on R. Thamaraikani, the then AIADMK leader, during an election campaign at Siddharkadu on 19 May 1984 and later acquitted
