= P. V. Rajendran =

Indian politician

P. V. Rajendran is an Indian politician and former Member of the Legislative Assembly of Tamil Nadu. He was elected to the Tamil Nadu legislative assembly as an Indian National Congress candidate from Vedaranyam constituency in 1989 and 1991 elections. He has also won the 1996 Parliamentary Elections by contesting from the Mayiladuthurai Constituency. He served as the Member of Parliament from 1996 to 1998, representing Mayiladuthurai Constituency.
