= S. J. Sadiq Pasha =

Indian politician

Treasurer of Dravida Munnetra Kazhagam
- In office 17 May 1977 – 12 May 1994
- President: M. Karunanidhi
- General Secretary: K. Anbazhagan
- Preceded by: K. Anbazhagan
- Succeeded by: Arcot N. Veeraswami

Member of Legislative Assembly
- In office 1977–1980
- Constituency: Thousand Lights
- In office 1967–1977
- In office 1989–1991
- Constituency: Udumalaipettai

Personal details
- Party: Dravida Munnetra Kazhagam

S. J. Sadiq Pasha is an Indian politician and former Member of the Legislative Assembly of Tamil Nadu. He was elected to the Tamil Nadu legislative assembly as a Dravida Munnetra Kazhagam candidate from Udumalpet constituency in 1967, 1971 and 1989 elections in 1977 Thousand Lights (State Assembly Constituency). He was the former Minister of Tamil Nadu from 1967 to 1976 and from 1989 to 1991.

== Elections Contested ==
=== Tamilnadu State Legislative Assembly Elections Contested ===
Elections	Constituency	Party	Result	Vote percentage	Opposition Candidate	Opposition Party	Opposition vote percentage
1962	Udumalaipettai	DMK	Lost	36.05	R. Rajagopalasami Naicker	INC	41.72
1967	Udumalaipettai	DMK	Won	58.17	K. Ramasami	INC	37.68
1971	Udumalaipettai	DMK	Won	62.76	T. Malayappa Gounder	Independent	35.81
1977	Thousand Lights	DMK	Won	37.13	Syed Khaleefa Thullah	Independent	30.35
1980	Thousand Lights	DMK	Lost	49.81	K. A. Krishnaswamy	AIADMK	50.19
1989	Udumalaipettai	DMK	Won	45.21	P. Kolandaivelu	AIADMK(J)	38.32
