= J. C. D. Prabhakar =

Indian politician

15th Speaker of Tamil Nadu Legislative Assembly
- Incumbent
- Assumed office 12 May 2026
- Governor: Rajendra Arlekar
- Deputy: M. Ravisankar
- Chief Minister: C. Joseph Vijay
- Preceded by: M. Appavu
- Constituency: Thousand Lights

Member of the Tamil Nadu Legislative Assembly
- Incumbent
- Assumed office 6 May 2026
- Chief Minister: C. Joseph Vijay
- Preceded by: Ezhilan Naganathan
- Constituency: Thousand Lights
- In office 23 May 2011 – 21 May 2016
- Chief Minister: J. Jayalalithaa
- Preceded by: B. Ranganathan
- Succeeded by: B. Ranganathan
- Constituency: Villivakkam
- In office 25 May 1980 – 31 December 1984
- Preceded by: K. Suppu
- Succeeded by: V. P. Chinthan
- Constituency: Villivakkam

Personal details
- Born: October 13, 1952 (age 74) Dindigul, Tamil Nadu, India
- Party: Tamilaga Vettri Kazhagam (2026–present)
- Other political affiliations: All India Anna Dravida Munnetra Kazhagam (1972–2026)

John Christian Devavaram Prabhakar (born 13 October 1952) is an Indian politician and a Member of the Legislative Assembly of Tamil Nadu representing the Thousand Lights Assembly constituency, as a member of the TVK. He is the Speaker of the Tamil Nadu Legislative Assembly.

He previously was a member of the 14th Tamil Nadu Legislative Assembly from the Thousand Lights constituency in Chennai District as a member of the All India Anna Dravida Munnetra Kazhagam (AIADMK), a party he represented till 2026.

In September 2016, Prabhakar was put forward as an AIADMK candidate for the Chennai Corporation elections.

On 3 January 2026 he joined the Tamilaga Vettri Kazhagam (TVK) party. He is also the candidate in Thousand Lights Chennai in the 2026 Assembly elections.

== Elections contested ==
=== Tamilnadu State Legislative Assembly elections contested ===
Elections	Constituency	Party	Result	Vote percentage	Opposition candidate	Opposition party	Opposition vote percentage
1980	Villivakkam	AIADMK	Won	47.84	K. Suppu	DMK	47.25
1984	Villivakkam	AIADMK	Lost	47.59	V. P. Chintan	CPI(M)	48.21
1989	Villivakkam	AIADMK(Ja)	Lost	14.24	W. R. Varadarajan	CPI(M)	46.77
2011	Villivakkam	AIADMK	Won	52.44	K. Anbazhagan	DMK	44.20
2016	Kolathur	AIADMK	Lost	31.83	M. K. Stalin	DMK	54.25
2021	Villivakkam	AIADMK	Lost	27.26	A. Vetriazhagan	DMK	53.37
2026	Thousand Lights	TVK	Won	44.73	Ezhilan Naganathan	DMK	33.24
