= K. S. G. Haja Shareef =

Indian industrialist and politician

7th Leader of the Opposition of the Tamil Nadu Legislative Assembly
- In office 29 August 1983 – 15 November 1984
- Chief Minister: M. G. Ramachandran
- Preceded by: M. Karunanidhi
- Succeeded by: O. Subramanian

Member of the Tamil Nadu Legislative Assembly
- In office 1980–1984
- Preceded by: M. Aranganathan
- Succeeded by: A. K. A. Abdul Samad
- Constituency: Triplicane

Member of the Madras Legislative Assembly
- In office 1962–1967
- Preceded by: U. Krishna Rao
- Succeeded by: Habibullah Baig
- Constituency: Harbour
- In office 1957–1962
- Preceded by: A. M. Sambandam
- Succeeded by: V. R. Nedunchezhiyan
- Constituency: Triplicane

Personal details
- Party: Indian National Congress

K. S. G. Haja Shareef was an Indian industrialist and politician from Tamil Nadu. Shareef served in the Madras Legislative Assembly and its successor body, the Tamil Nadu Legislative Assembly, from 1957 to 1967 and from 1980 to 1984. A member of the Indian National Congress, Shareef was the 7th Leader of the Opposition in the Tamil Nadu Legislative Assembly from 1983 until 1984.

== Political career ==
Shareef was first elected to represent the Triplicane Assembly constituency in the 1957 Madras Legislative Assembly election. Although Shareef was a Rowther Tamil Muslim, the Indian Union Muslim League led by M. Muhammad Ismail, supported independent Hindu candidates against Shareef after an alliance negotiation between the IUML and INC failed. Shareef received a narrow plurality with 36% of the vote, with his closest opponent at 33%. Shareef supported U. Krishna Rao for speaker of the legislative assembly in 1957.

For the 1962 Madras Legislative Assembly election, Shareef ran in the Harbour Assembly constituency instead of in Triplicane. He defeated C. P. Chitrarasu of the Dravida Munnetra Kazhagam, receiving 50% of the vote to Chitrarasu's 44%. However, in the 1967 Madras Legislative Assembly election, Shareef was defeated by Habibullah Baig, an independent candidate associated with the Muslim League.

Shareef ran again in the 1980 Tamil Nadu Legislative Assembly election, winning in Triplicane with 53% of the vote. In 1981, Sadiq Ali, the governor of Tamil Nadu, announced that Shareef was to be disqualified from the assembly due to his appointment as the Honorary Consul General of Turkey in Madras, as the Election Commission of India concluded that this meant he was in allegiance to a foreign state. However, Shareef was ultimately not disqualified from office.

On 29 August 1983, Shareef became the Leader of the Opposition in the legislative assembly, leading the INC opposition against the government of M. G. Ramachandran of the All India Anna Dravida Munnetra Kazhagam. Shareef served in this role until his defeat by A. K. A. Abdul Samad of the DMK in the 1984 Tamil Nadu Legislative Assembly election.

Shareef was later elected to be the president of the Federation of Indian Chambers of Commerce & Industry for 1987. He was also a longtime member of Rotary International and was the president of the South India Chamber of Commerce.
