= Varadarajan =

Varadarajan is both a surname and a given name. Notable people with the name include:

- Siddharth Varadarajan (born 1965), founding editor of The Wire
- Srinidhi Varadarajan, director of Virginia Tech’s Terascale Computing Facility
- W. R. Varadarajan (1945–2010), Indian politician and trade unionist
- Tunku Varadarajan, Professor of Business at New York University
- Veeravalli S. Varadarajan (1937–2019), mathematician
- Varadarajan Mudaliar (1926–1988)
- Mukund Varadarajan (1983–2014), Indian officer
