= Department of Artificial Intelligence, Information Technology and Digital Services (Tamil Nadu) =

Government department of Tamil Nadu state, India

Agency overview
- Jurisdiction: Tamil Nadu
- Headquarters: Chennai
- Minister responsible: R. Kumar, Minister of Artificial Intelligence, Information Technology and Digital Services
- Agency executive: Dr Atul Anand IAS, Additional Chief Secretary to Government of Tamil Nadu
- Parent agency: Government of Tamil Nadu
- Website: Artificial Intelligence, Information Technology and Digital Services

The Department of Artificial Intelligence, Information Technology and Digital Services is one of the departments of Government of Tamil Nadu.

== Objective ==
The objectives of the department are to provide government services through the internet, enable adoption of Information technology in governance, increase software exports from the state, provide cable television and enable the adoption of Tamil in computing.

== Software and IT ==
As of 2022, The state is amongst the major Information technology (IT) exporters of India with a value of ₹57,687 crore (US$6.2 billion). Established in 2000, Tidel Park in Chennai was amongst the first and largest IT parks in Asia. The presence of SEZs and government policies have contributed to the growth of the sector which has attracted foreign investments and job seekers from other parts of the country. In the 2020s, Chennai has become a major provider of SaaS and has been dubbed the "SaaS Capital of India".

== Sub-divisions ==
The following sub-divisions and undertakings operate under the department:

- Electronics Corporation of Tamil Nadu (ELCOT): Development of IT infrastructure and special economic zones
- Tamil Nadu State Wide Area Network (TANSWAN): Internet connectivity across the state
- Tamil Nadu Skill Development Corporation (TNSDC)
- Tamil Nadu Disaster Recovery Centre (TNDRC): Co-ordination and recovery during disasters
- Tamil Nadu e-Governance Agency (TNeGA): Adoption of IT in government and enable government services through internet
- ICT Academy
- Tamil Nadu Arasu Cable TV Corporation (TACTV): Digital cable television services
- Tamil Nadu Fibernet Corporation (TANFINET): Optical fiber connectivity
- Tamil Virtual Academy (TVA)

== See also ==
- Government of Tamil Nadu
- Tamil Nadu Government's Departments
