= K. Suppu =

Indian politician

Personal details
- Died: 2011
- Party: Indian National Congress (1989-–2011)
- Other political affiliations: Communist Party of India (1951–1976); Dravida Munnetra Kazhagam (1977-–1989)

K. Suppu (died 29 October 2011) was an Indian politician and former Member of the Legislative Assembly of Tamil Nadu. He was elected to the Tamil Nadu legislative assembly as a Communist Party of India candidate from Rajapalayam constituency in 1971 election. He later joined and became a well-known maverick in the Dravida Munnetra Kazhagam party.

== Elections Contested ==
=== Tamil Nadu State Legislative Assembly Elections Contested ===
Elections	Constituency	Party	Result	Vote percentage	Opposition Candidate	Opposition Party	Opposition vote percentage
1971	Rajapalayam	CPI	Won	50.45	K. R. Srirenga Raja	INC	49.55
1977	Villivakkam	DMK	Won	41.07	R. Sarweshwar Rao	AIADMK	32.38
1984	Villivakkam	DMK	Lost	47.25	J. C. D. Prabhakar	AIADMK	47.84
1991	Harbour	INC	Lost	47.26	M. Karunanidhi	DMK	48.66
1991 By-Election	Harbour	INC	Lost	44.18	A. Selvarasan	DMK	53.05
