= K. A. Mathiazhagan =

Indian politician

Speaker of Tamil Nadu legislative assembly
- In office 1971–1972

Minister of Finance (Government of Tamil Nadu)
- In office 1969–1970

Minister of Food, Revenue and Commercial Taxes (Government of Tamil Nadu)
- In office 1967–1969

Personal details
- Born: Kaniyur A. Somasundaram; 7 December 1926 Kaniyur, Coimbatore, Tamil Nadu, India
- Died: 17 August 1983 (aged 56)
- Spouse: Mrs. Raja Sundari Mathialagan
- Children: Late Mrs. Aruna Seralathan, Mrs. Malarvizhi Udayakumar, Mrs. Theanmozhi Yatish and Mr. Udhaya Suriyan

K. A. Mathiazhagan was an Indian politician and co-founder of the Dravida Munnetra Kazhagam (DMK). He served as the Finance Minister, Minister of Food, Revenue and Commercial Taxes in the Tamil Nadu government and Speaker of the Tamil Nadu Legislative Assembly.

== Biography ==
He was born on 7 December 1926 in Kaniyur in Coimbatore district (now Tiruppur district) as Somasunduram. He studied at the Boarding High School in Udumalpet. He graduated from Annamalai University. He also studied law and practiced as a lawyer. He was the younger brother of K. A. Murugesan, a Dravidar Kazhagam (DK) leader and the elder brother of K. A. Krishnaswamy who later on became a minister in the M.G.R. government. Their family is called "The Kaniyur Family" or the "Kaniyur Kudumbam" and was referred to as the foremost family of the Dravidian Movement by C. N. Annadurai, as a recognition given to the family for their contributions to the Dravidian Movement.. He died on 17 August 1983 and at the age of 57 years.

== Political life ==
When C. N. Annadurai split from the DK and went on to form the DMK, Mathiazhagan became one of the founding leaders of the DMK along with Annadurai, V. R. Nedunchezhiyan, E. V. K. Sampath and N. V. Natarajan. Mathialagan along with the other four founding leaders is referred to as the "Aimberum Thalaivargal" after the mummunai struggle in 1950's (Five Great Leaders or Heads). He went on to become one of the early members of the DMK. He was elected to the Tamil Nadu legislative assembly from Thousand Lights constituency as a DMK candidate in the 1962, 1967, and 1971 elections.

=== Electoral history ===
Election	Constituency	Winner	Votes	Party	Runner-up	Votes	Party	Status
1962	Thousand lights	K. A. Mathiazhagan	27,984	DMK	Indrani Changalvarayan	25,609	INC	Won
1967	Thousand lights	K. A. Mathiazhagan	39,518	DMK	M. Sivaraj	25,370	INC	Won
1971	Thousand lights	K. A. Mathiazhagan	38,891	DMK	N. M. Mani Varma	27,332	NCO	Won

== Tamil Nadu minister ==
He served as a minister of Food, Revenue and Commercial Taxes in C. N. Annadurai's administration from 6 March 1967 to 10 February 1969. He also served as Minister of Finance in M. Karunanidhi's administration after the Annadurai's death. In September 1970 he resigned from the cabinet, citing moral and ethical issues after charges of corruption, involving the purchase of a bungalow, were brought upon him by the opposition. These charges were later on proved to be false. It is claimed in some quarters, that these charges were leveled against him because he was considered to be a threat to Karunanidhi's leadership.

== Speaker ==
He served as the Speaker of the Tamil Nadu Legislative Assembly from 1971 to 1972. M. G. Ramachandran was expelled from the DMK on 10 October 1972 and founded the party Anna Dravida Munnetra Kazhagam (AIADMK). Mathiazhagan, the then speaker of the Tamil Nadu assembly, became an open supporter of Ramachandran.

In 1972, he echoed the popular sentiment of that time, that the government had lost its credibility with the people, while being the speaker of the house. A rarity considering the fact that he was speaking the truth against his own party and by default jeopardising his own political future. This was followed by a constitutional drama which happened in late 1972 in the house. On 14 November, Mathiazhagan advised the then chief minister, M.Karunanidhi, to dissolve the house and face the electorate if the government was to earn its lost credibility. Karunanidhi caused the adjournment of the house against all norms. Mathiazhagan and Ramachandran, the leader of the AIADMK in the assembly, filed a writ petition questioning the validity of the whole action . On 2 December, when the assembly was re convened, both Speaker and Deputy Speaker were presiding over the proceedings and both were cancelling each other's actions. After hours of confusion Speaker Mathiazhagan left the house, adjourning the house. At this juncture, Karunanidhi, based on a motion authored in the name of V.R.Nedunchelian, declared that K.A.Mathiazhagan was removed from the post of the Speaker.

He returned to DMK in 1974 and acted as deputy chairperson of planning commission of Tamil Nadu in the Kalaingar government. He acted as deputy general secretary of DMK till his last day.
