= Ezhilan Naganathan =

Indian politician (born 1979)

Ezhilan Naganathan MBBS, M.D.

Member of Tamil Nadu Legislative Assembly
- In office May 2021 – 2026
- Preceded by: Ku.Ka. Selvam
- Succeeded by: J. C. D. Prabhakar
- Constituency: Thousand Lights

Personal details
- Born: 27 June 1979 (age 47) Madras, Tamil Nadu, India
- Party: Dravida Munnetra Kazhagam (DMK)
- Spouse: R. Priyadarshini
- Relations: Anjalai Ammal (maternal great-grandmother); K.R. Jamathakni (maternal grandfather)
- Children: 2
- Parent(s): M.Naganathan; J.Santhi
- Education: Don Bosco Matric Higher Secondary School; Madras Medical College
- Occupation: General Physician, social activist
- Awards: B Braun Medical Award Edward Norraday Award for excellence in the field of Medicine

Ezhilan Naganathan (born 27 June 1979) is an Indian medical practitioner, social activist and politician from the Dravida Munnetra Kazhagam (DMK). He represented the Thousand Lights constituency in the Tamil Nadu Legislative Assembly from 2021 to 2026.

== Early life ==
Ezhilan was born on 27 June 1979 in Madras (now Chennai), the capital of Tamil Nadu. Both his mother, Santhi, and father, M. Naganathan, were Professors with strong Dravidian ideals. Naganathan was a close associate of Ex-Chief Minister of Tamil Nadu M Karunanidhi for over 40 years and served as the Vice-Chairman of Tamil Nadu State Planning Commission from 2006-2011.

Ezhilan graduated from Don Bosco Matriculation Higher Secondary School, Chennai. He was a serious student and talented young dancer. Ezhilan completed his under-graduate and post-graduate studies in Medicine from Madras Medical College (MMC).

During his time at MMC, he was decorated with the B Bruan Medical Award and Edward Norraday Award for academic excellence in the field of medicine. He was a gold medalist in his class for medicine in the year 2007. Ezhilan was force behind protests that fought for an increase in the minimum pay of post-graduate students. Ezhilan was instrumental in establishing an exclusive poison control centre in MMC, that contributes to saving thousands of lives of farmers from snakes, scorpions, rats and pesticides across Tamil Nadu.

== Career ==
Ezhilan has run a private clinic in Teynampet, Chennai since the 2000s to provide free medical assistance for the poor, served at CSI Kalyani Mission Hospital, Chennai for 10 years. He was a consulting physician at Aswenee Hospital at Poes Garden, Chennai. He also consults at Kauvery Hospital, Alwarpet Chennai.

He has mentored 40 post-graduate students who became practising professionals across India.

He was entrusted with the responsibility of complete medical care of Kalaignar for nearly a decade.

== Activist ==
He is the founder of NGO MAX Medical Foundation. It is committed to educating Tamil Nadu youth in imparting the value of scientific temperament and eradicating superstitions. His organization is in the forefront of aiding the poor. He conducts statewide health camps and first aid centres. He is a Rotarian and won two district awards as the Director of Public Health for his work among AIDS-affected children and transgender communities. He is a founder of Illaignar Iyamkkam youth organization - a NGO that works for education and empowerment of the youth of Tamil Nadu about science, social justice and equality.

== Politics ==
Ezhilan and family are Periarists. They believe in Dravidan ideologies and follow the path of Arignar Anna and Thandhai Periyar on secularism and social justice.

Ezhilan joined Dravida Munnetra Kazhagam (DMK) party to run for Tamil Nadu State Assembly Elections 2021 from Thousand Lights Constituency, Chennai.

Ezhilan advocates for the importance of social justice, scientific temperament, secularism and state autonomy across Tamil Nadu.

He opposed exclusionary policies such as NEET, NEP, NRC, CAA through statewide protest, public gatherings, meetings and TV shows. He opposed all the majoritarian policies of the central and state government during 2016-2021. He has been a guest speaker and participated in many debates and interviews in Regional and National television in India, on topics surrounding social justice, state government’s policies on inclusion and education. DMK was responsible for bringing NEET to Tamil Nadu.

Ezhilan is a familiar face, expressed in TheNewsminute article.

His causes include the Sri Lankan Tamil Independence movement and the Kudankulam nuclear power plant protests.

== Electoral performance ==
2021 Tamil Nadu Legislative Assembly election: Thousand Lights
Party	Candidate	Votes	%	±%
DMK	Ezhilan Naganathan	71,867	53.41	+10.06
BJP	Khushbu	39,405	29.29	+23.31
MNM	K. M. Shariff	11,791	8.76	New
NTK	A. J. Sherine	8,884	6.60	+5.15
NOTA	NOTA	1,385	1.03	−1.52
AMMK	N. Vaidhyanathan	1,155	0.86	New
Margin of victory		32,462	24.13	17.93
Turnout		134,555	56.05	−4.36
Rejected ballots		733	0.54	
Registered electors		240,073		
DMK hold		Swing	10.06	
