= S. Thirumalaisamy Gounder =

Indian politician

S. Thirumalaisamy Gounder is an Indian politician and former Member of the Tamil Nadu Legislative Assembly. He was elected to the Tamil Nadu Legislative Assembly as an Indian National Congress candidate from Udumalpet constituency in 1984.
