= C. P. Chitrarasu =

Indian politician

- Born: Chinnaraj P. Chitrarasu; 11 April 1906; Kanchipuram, Tamilnadu
- Died: 16 February 1978 (aged 69)
- Parent(s): C.K.Peddasamy Naidu, Lakshmiammal

C. P. Chitrarasu (11 April 1906 – 16 February 1978) was an Indian politician and writer from Tamil Nadu. He was the chairman of the Tamil Nadu Legislative Council during 1970-76. He was nicknamed Sindhanai Sirpi (lit. Sculptor of thought).

== Biography ==
C.P Chitrarasu was born in Kanchipuram to Bethasamy Naidu and Lakshmi Ammal. His birth name was "Chinnaraj". He changed his name due to the influence of Ku. Mu. Annal Thango of the Tanittamil Iyakkam. He joined the Justice Party in the 1930s. He was an associate of C. N. Annadurai. When Annadurai left the Dravidar Kazhagam (successor to the Justice party) to form the Dravida Munnetra Kazhagam (DMK) in 1949, Chitrarasu followed him. He was among the DMK's leading public speakers. He started a magazine called Theepori in 1953. In 1959 he became the editor of the periodical Inamuzhakkam. In the 1950s he worked as a script writer at the Modern Theaters film company. Chitrarasu wrote a total of 23 books including biographies of world leaders and plays. He also wrote the script for the 1960 film Aadavantha Deivam.

C.P.Chitrarasu was a member of DMK's general and executive councils. He was also the editor of its official newspaper Nam Naadu. He contested and lost the 1957 general elections and 1962 assembly elections from the Tirupattur and Harbour constituencies, respectively, losing to K. S. G. Haja Shareef in the latter. In 1970 he was elected to the Tamil Nadu legislative council and became its presiding officer (chairman). He continued in that position till 1976. He left the DMK in 1976 and joined M. G. Ramachandran's ADMK.

He died in 1978. On his death Mr.M.G.Ramachandran the then chief minister of Tamil Nadu walked the entire of approx 3 km stretch from C.P Chitarasu residence at Anna Nagar, Chennai to burial ground in New Avadi Road, Chennai, along with the vehicle carrying his mortal remains. In 1989, the collectorate at Vellore was named after him by the Chief Minister Mr.M.Karunanidhi.
