= D. Selvaraj (Udumalpet MLA) =

Indian politician

Thiru Selvaraj Nayakar

Member of Tamil Nadu Legislative Assembly
- In office 1996–2001

Personal details
- Party: Dravida Munnetra Kazhagam
- Occupation: Statesman; Lawmaker; Landlord
- Nickname: Thambu

D. Selvaraj was an Indian politician and a Member of the Legislative Assembly, representing Udumalpet Constituency in the 11th Tamil Nadu Legislative Assembly between 1996 and 2001 as a DMK member. He was often referred to by the press and in political circles as Bodipatti Thambu Nayakar in accordance with local custom.
