= Udumalaipettai Assembly constituency =

One of the 234 State Legislative Assembly Constituencies in Tamil Nadu, in India

Coordinates: 10.58°N 77.24°E

Udumalaipettai
- Constituency No. 125 for the Tamil Nadu Legislative Assembly

Constituency details
- Country: India
- Region: South India
- State: Tamil Nadu
- District: Tiruppur
- Lok Sabha constituency: Pollachi
- Established: 1951
- Total electors: 2,31,009
- Reservation: None

Member of Legislative Assembly
- 17th Tamil Nadu Legislative Assembly
- Incumbent Jayakumar M.
- Party: DMK
- Alliance: SPA
- Elected year: 2026

Udumalaipettai is an inter-district legislative assembly of Tamil Nadu that is spread across Tiruppur district and Coimbatore district, which includes the city of Udumalpet. Its State Assembly Constituency number is 125. Udumalpet Assembly constituency is a part of Pollachi Lok Sabha constituency. It is one of the 234 State Legislative Assembly Constituencies in Tamil Nadu, in India.

== Members of Legislative Assembly ==
=== Madras State ===
Year	Winner	Party
1952	Mounagurusami Naidu	Indian National Congress
1957	S. T. Subbaya Gounder	Independent
1962	R. Rajagopalasami Naicker	Indian National Congress
1967	S. J. Sadiq Pasha	Dravida Munnetra Kazhagam

=== Tamil Nadu ===
Year	Winner	Party
1971	S. J. Sadiq Pasha	Dravida Munnetra Kazhagam
1977	P. Kolandaivelu	All India Anna Dravida Munnetra Kazhagam
1980	P. Kolandaivelu	All India Anna Dravida Munnetra Kazhagam
1984	S. Thirumalaisamy Gounder	Indian National Congress
1989	S. J. Sadiq Pasha	Dravida Munnetra Kazhagam
1991	K. P. Manivasagam	All India Anna Dravida Munnetra Kazhagam
1996	D. Selvaraj	Dravida Munnetra Kazhagam
2001	C. Shanmugavelu	All India Anna Dravida Munnetra Kazhagam
2006	C. Shanmugavelu	All India Anna Dravida Munnetra Kazhagam
2011	Pollachi V. Jayaraman	All India Anna Dravida Munnetra Kazhagam
2016	Udumalai K. Radhakrishnan	All India Anna Dravida Munnetra Kazhagam
2021	Udumalai K. Radhakrishnan	All India Anna Dravida Munnetra Kazhagam
2026	M. Jayakumar	Dravida Munnetra Kazhagam

== Election results ==
Vote share of winning candidates
2026	33.67%
2021	50.23%
2016	44.73%
2011	60.87%
2006	46.09%
2001	56.92%
1996	52.53%
1991	60.42%
1989	45.21%
1984	53.30%
1980	52.34%
1977	34.30%
1971	62.76%
1967	58.17%
1962	41.72%
1957	33.92%
1952	47.43%

=== 2026 ===
2026 Tamil Nadu Legislative Assembly election: Udumalaipettai
Party	Candidate	Votes	%	±%
DMK	M. Jeyakumar	68,549	33.67	New
AIADMK	Udumalai K. Radhakrishnan	65,667	32.26	▼17.97
TVK	K. Sankar	59,831	29.39	New
NTK	M. Ram Kumar	6,702	3.29	▼1.16
NOTA	NOTA	1,149	0.56	▼0.21
Margin of victory		2,882	1.41	▼9.94
Turnout		2,03,575	88.12	▲16.62
Registered electors		2,31,009		▼38,751
DMK gain from AIADMK		Swing	New	

=== 2021 ===
2021 Tamil Nadu Legislative Assembly election: Udumalaipettai
Party	Candidate	Votes	%	±%
AIADMK	Udumalai K. Radhakrishnan	96,893	50.23%	+5.51
INC	K. Thennarasu	74,998	38.88%	New
NTK	A. Babu Ranjendra Prasad	8,592	4.45%	New
MNM	V. Srinithi	8,163	4.23%	New
NOTA	NOTA	1,478	0.77%	−1.04
AMMK	R. Palanisamy	1,043	0.54%	New
Margin of victory		21,895	11.35%	8.24%
Turnout		192,880	71.50%	−2.05%
Rejected ballots		299	0.16%	
Registered electors		269,760		
AIADMK hold		Swing	5.51%	

=== 2016 ===
2016 Tamil Nadu Legislative Assembly election: Udumalaipettai
Party	Candidate	Votes	%	±%
AIADMK	Udumalai K. Radhakrishnan	81,817	44.73%	−16.14
DMK	Mu. Ka. Muthu	76,130	41.62%	New
BJP	U. K. P. N. Kandhasamy	7,339	4.01%	+1.58
DMDK	S. Ganeshkumar	7,090	3.88%	New
KMDK	C. Ragupathi Raghavan	3,562	1.95%	New
NOTA	NOTA	3,306	1.81%	New
PMK	P. Duraisamy	1,975	1.08%	New
Margin of victory		5,687	3.11%	−25.30%
Turnout		182,917	73.56%	−4.69%
Registered electors		248,679		
AIADMK hold		Swing	-16.14%	

=== 2011 ===
2011 Tamil Nadu Legislative Assembly election: Udumalaipettai
Party	Candidate	Votes	%	±%
AIADMK	Pollachi V. Jayaraman	95,477	60.87%	+14.79
KNMK	T. Ilamparrithi	50,917	32.46%	New
BJP	M. Viswanathan	3,817	2.43%	+1.61
Independent	M. Venkatachalam	2,403	1.53%	New
Independent	K. Jayaraman	1,870	1.19%	New
Independent	R. S. Mohanraj	1,496	0.95%	New
BSP	P. Velusamy	865	0.55%	−0.01
Margin of victory		44,560	28.41%	26.00%
Turnout		156,845	78.25%	9.01%
Registered electors		200,450		
AIADMK hold		Swing	14.79%	

=== 2006 ===
2006 Tamil Nadu Legislative Assembly election: Udumalaipettai
Party	Candidate	Votes	%	±%
AIADMK	C. Shanmugavelu	66,178	46.09%	−10.84
DMK	C. Veluchamy	62,715	43.68%	+15.53
DMDK	G. R. Gnanasambandham	9,153	6.37%	New
Independent	K. Kathhirvel	1,207	0.84%	New
BJP	M. K. Karthikeyan	1,179	0.82%	New
Independent	N. Vanjimuthu	871	0.61%	New
BSP	K. Ramaganapathy	812	0.57%	New
Margin of victory		3,463	2.41%	−26.37%
Turnout		143,593	69.23%	3.60%
Registered electors		207,409		
AIADMK hold		Swing	-10.84%	

=== 2001 ===
2001 Tamil Nadu Legislative Assembly election: Udumalaipettai
Party	Candidate	Votes	%	±%
AIADMK	C. Shanmugavelu	78,938	56.92%	+22.83
DMK	D. Selvaraj	39,030	28.14%	−24.38
MDMK	R. T. Mariappan	16,884	12.18%	+1
Independent	M. Thangavel	2,070	1.49%	New
Independent	M. Saminathan	1,067	0.77%	New
Margin of victory		39,908	28.78%	10.34%
Turnout		138,676	65.63%	−8.39%
Registered electors		211,445		
AIADMK gain from DMK		Swing	4.40%	

=== 1996 ===
1996 Tamil Nadu Legislative Assembly election: Udumalaipettai
Party	Candidate	Votes	%	±%
DMK	D. Selvaraj	69,286	52.53%	+16.41
AIADMK	C. Shanmugavelu	44,966	34.09%	−26.33
MDMK	R. T. Mariappan	14,737	11.17%	New
BJP	S. Saminathan	1,588	1.20%	New
Margin of victory		24,320	18.44%	−5.86%
Turnout		131,906	74.02%	5.04%
Registered electors		186,663		
DMK gain from AIADMK		Swing	-7.89%	

=== 1991 ===
1991 Tamil Nadu Legislative Assembly election: Udumalaipettai
Party	Candidate	Votes	%	±%
AIADMK	K. P. Manivasagam	75,262	60.42%	+22.1
DMK	R. T. Mariappan	44,990	36.12%	−9.1
PMK	N. P. Kandasamy	1,444	1.16%	New
THMM	N. Kumaran	1,060	0.85%	New
JP	S. Damodharan	863	0.69%	New
Margin of victory		30,272	24.30%	17.40%
Turnout		124,574	68.98%	−8.00%
Registered electors		186,110		
AIADMK gain from DMK		Swing	15.20%	

=== 1989 ===
1989 Tamil Nadu Legislative Assembly election: Udumalaipettai
Party	Candidate	Votes	%	±%
DMK	S. J. Sadiq Pasha	55,089	45.21%	+0.93
AIADMK	P. Kolandaivelu	46,684	38.32%	New
INC	S. Thirumalaisamy Gounder	13,369	10.97%	−42.33
AIADMK	K. Palanisamy Gounder	4,823	3.96%	New
Margin of victory		8,405	6.90%	−2.12%
Turnout		121,842	76.98%	−0.27%
Registered electors		161,620		
DMK gain from INC		Swing	-8.09%	

=== 1984 ===
1984 Tamil Nadu Legislative Assembly election: Udumalaipettai
Party	Candidate	Votes	%	±%
INC	S. Thirumalaisamy Gounder	56,004	53.30%	New
DMK	R. T. Mariyappan	46,526	44.28%	−3.38
Independent	Basheer Ahmed	769	0.73%	New
Independent	K. B. Babu	746	0.71%	New
Independent	A. S. Mani	619	0.59%	New
Margin of victory		9,478	9.02%	4.34%
Turnout		105,064	77.26%	3.89%
Registered electors		144,150		
INC gain from AIADMK		Swing	0.97%	

=== 1980 ===
1980 Tamil Nadu Legislative Assembly election: Udumalaipettai
Party	Candidate	Votes	%	±%
AIADMK	P. Kolandaivelu	50,570	52.34%	+18.04
DMK	R. T. Mariyappan	46,049	47.66%	+22.58
Margin of victory		4,521	4.68%	−0.24%
Turnout		96,619	73.36%	3.98%
Registered electors		134,138		
AIADMK hold		Swing	18.04%	

=== 1977 ===
1977 Tamil Nadu Legislative Assembly election: Udumalaipettai
Party	Candidate	Votes	%	±%
AIADMK	P. Kolandaivelu	28,737	34.30%	New
JP	U. K. P. Natarajan	24,619	29.39%	New
DMK	R. T. Mariyappan	21,015	25.09%	−37.67
CPI	M. Lingasamy	9,403	11.22%	New
Margin of victory		4,118	4.92%	−22.03%
Turnout		83,774	69.38%	−6.44%
Registered electors		122,735		
AIADMK gain from DMK		Swing	-28.45%	

=== 1971 ===
1971 Tamil Nadu Legislative Assembly election: Udumalaipettai
Party	Candidate	Votes	%	±%
DMK	S. J. Sadiq Pasha	45,369	62.76%	+4.59
Independent	T. Malayappa Gounder	25,887	35.81%	New
Independent	M. Dorai Raj Thevar	594	0.82%	New
Independent	P. Rangaswamy Gounder	443	0.61%	New
Margin of victory		19,482	26.95%	6.46%
Turnout		72,293	75.82%	−3.77%
Registered electors		102,495		
DMK hold		Swing	4.59%	

=== 1967 ===
1967 Madras Legislative Assembly election: Udumalaipettai
Party	Candidate	Votes	%	±%
DMK	S. J. Sadiq Pasha	39,796	58.17%	+22.12
INC	K. Ramasami	25,778	37.68%	−4.04
Independent	M. D. Thevar	2,840	4.15%	New
Margin of victory		14,018	20.49%	14.82%
Turnout		68,414	79.59%	1.58%
Registered electors		89,940		
DMK gain from INC		Swing	16.45%	

=== 1962 ===
1962 Madras Legislative Assembly election: Udumalaipettai
Party	Candidate	Votes	%	±%
INC	R. Rajagopalasami Naicker	29,529	41.72%	+14.57
DMK	S. J. Sadiq Pasha	25,514	36.05%	New
CPI	G. Damodaran	10,980	15.51%	New
PSP	C. Muthsami Gounder	4,752	6.71%	New
Margin of victory		4,015	5.67%	−1.10%
Turnout		70,775	78.01%	17.26%
Registered electors		95,170		
INC gain from Independent		Swing	7.80%	

=== 1957 ===
1957 Madras Legislative Assembly election: Udumalaipettai
Party	Candidate	Votes	%	±%
Independent	S. T. Subbayya Gounder	18,621	33.92%	New
INC	N. Mounaguruswamy Naidu	14,903	27.15%	−20.28
PSP	T. Kandasami Gounder	11,093	20.21%	New
Independent	K. A. Mathiyazhagan	10,274	18.72%	New
Margin of victory		3,718	6.77%	−15.41%
Turnout		54,891	60.75%	10.69%
Registered electors		90,360		
Independent gain from INC		Swing	-13.50%	

=== 1952 ===
1952 Madras Legislative Assembly election: Udumalaipettai
Party	Candidate	Votes	%	±%
INC	Mounaguruswami Naidu	19,866	47.43%	New
CPI	Thangavelu	10,574	25.24%	New
Socialist Party (India)	Guruswami Naicker	7,700	18.38%	New
Independent	Naidu C. D	3,749	8.95%	New
Margin of victory		9,292	22.18%	
Turnout		41,889	50.06%	
Registered electors		83,679		
INC win (new seat)				
