= Habibullah Baig =

Indian politician

Dr. Habibullah Baig

Member of the Tamil Nadu Legislative Assembly
- In office 1967 - 1972
- Preceded by: K. S. G. Haja Shareef
- Constituency: Harbour

Personal details
- Party: Independent politician

Dr.Habibullah Baig was an Indian politician who served as member of the Madras Legislative Assembly and mayor of Madras during 1967–68. He belonged to the Muslim League. He defeated K. S. G. Haja Shareef in the 1967 Tamil Nadu Legislative Assembly election for the Harbour Assembly constituency.

== Electoral performance ==
1971 Tamil Nadu Legislative Assembly election: Harbour
Party	Candidate	Votes	%	±%
Independent	A. M. Mohideen	29,225	49.44	New
INC	G. Umapathy	28,739	48.62	+3.71
Independent	Habibullah Baig	1,151	1.95	New
Margin of victory		486	0.82	−5.96
Turnout		59,115	67.52	−5.16
Registered electors		90,850		
Independent hold		Swing	-2.25	

1967 Madras Legislative Assembly election: Harbour
Party	Candidate	Votes	%	±%
Independent	Habibullah Baig	29,360	51.69	New
INC	K. S. G. Haja Shareef	25,510	44.91	−4.96
ABJS	Motilal	1,935	3.41	New
Margin of victory		3,850	6.78	0.66
Turnout		56,805	72.68	1.00
Registered electors		80,590		
Independent gain from INC		Swing	1.82	
