= Harbour Assembly constituency =

State Legislative Assembly Constituency in Tamil Nadu

Coordinates: 13.082°N 80.292°E

Harbour
- Constituency No. 18 for the Tamil Nadu Legislative Assembly

Constituency details
- Country: India
- Region: South India
- State: Tamil Nadu
- District: Chennai
- Lok Sabha constituency: Chennai Central
- Established: 1951
- Total electors: 120,126

Member of Legislative Assembly
- 17th Tamil Nadu Legislative Assembly
- Incumbent P. K. Sekar Babu
- Party: DMK
- Alliance: SPA
- Elected year: 2026

Harbour is a state assembly constituency in Chennai district of the Indian state of Tamil Nadu. Its State Assembly Constituency number is 18. It falls under Chennai Central Lok Sabha constituency during national elections. Most successful party: DMK (ten times). It is one of the 234 State Legislative Assembly Constituencies in Tamil Nadu, in India. Former Chief Minister Karunanidhi won from this in 1991, only dmk candidate who won in election, later resigned.

== Overview ==
As per orders of the Delimitation Commission, No. 18 Harbour Assembly constituency is composed of Ward 23-30, 43-44, 48-49 and 80 of Greater Chennai Corporation.

== Members of Legislative Assembly ==
Year	Member	Political party
Madras State
1952	U. Krishna Rao	Indian National Congress
1957	U. Krishna Rao	Indian National Congress
1962	K. S. G. Haja Sahriff	Indian National Congress
1967	Habibullah Baig	Independent
Tamil Nadu
1971	A. M. Mohideen	Independent
1977	A. Selvarajan	Dravida Munnetra Kazhagam
1980	A. Selvarajan	Dravida Munnetra Kazhagam
1984	A. Selvarajan	Dravida Munnetra Kazhagam
1989	M. Karunanidhi	Dravida Munnetra Kazhagam
1991	M. Karunanidhi	Dravida Munnetra Kazhagam
1991^	Selvarasam	Dravida Munnetra Kazhagam
1996	K. Anbazhagan	Dravida Munnetra Kazhagam
2001	K. Anbazhagan	Dravida Munnetra Kazhagam
2006	K. Anbazhagan	Dravida Munnetra Kazhagam
2011	Pala. Karuppiah	All India Anna Dravida Munnetra Kazhagam
2016	P. K. Sekar Babu	Dravida Munnetra Kazhagam
2021	P. K. Sekar Babu	Dravida Munnetra Kazhagam
2026	P. K. Sekar Babu	Dravida Munnetra Kazhagam

== Election results ==
Vote share of winning candidates
2026	45.43%
2021	58.88%
2016	40.36%
2011	55.89%
2006	44.24%
2001	46.98%
1996	70.57%
1991	48.66%
1991 by-election	53.05%
1989	59.76%
1984	55.30%
1980	54.14%
1977	36.71%
1971	49.44%
1967	51.69%
1962	49.87%
1957	54.99%
1952	46.68%

=== 2026 ===
2026 Tamil Nadu Legislative Assembly election: Harbour
Party	Candidate	Votes	%	±%
DMK	P. K. Sekar Babu	45,254	45.43	▼13.45
TVK	Sinora Ashok	33,504	33.63	New
AIADMK	R. Manohar	17,256	17.32	▼14.49
NTK	R. Faisan Sherif	1607	1.61	▼1.72
NOTA	NOTA	600	0.60	▼0.17
Margin of victory		11,750	11.80	▼15.27
Turnout		99,622	82.93	▲25.62
Rejected ballots				
Registered electors		120,126		
DMK hold		Swing	▼15.27	

=== 2021 ===
2021 Tamil Nadu Legislative Assembly election: Harbour
Party	Candidate	Votes	%	±%
DMK	P. K. Sekar Babu	59,317	58.88	+18.52
BJP	Vinoj P. Selvam	32,043	31.81	+18.99
MNM	A. Ramesh	3,763	3.74	New
NTK	M. Ahamed Fazil	3,357	3.33	+2.47
NOTA	NOTA	913	0.91	−1.11
AMMK	P. Santhana Krishnan	775	0.77	New
Margin of victory		27,274	27.07	22.44
Turnout		100,737	57.31	1.92
Rejected ballots		37	0.04	
Registered electors		175,770		
DMK hold		Swing	18.52	

=== 2016 ===
2016 Tamil Nadu Legislative Assembly election: Harbour
Party	Candidate	Votes	%	±%
DMK	P. K. Sekar Babu	42,071	40.36	+5.53
AIADMK	K. S. Sreenivasan	37,235	35.72	−20.17
BJP	Krishnakumar Nadhani	13,357	12.81	+7.98
SDPI	S. Ameer Hamsa	4,161	3.99	+1.67
NOTA	NOTA	2,101	2.02	New
MDMK	B. Murad Buhari	1,970	1.89	New
PMK	R. Sureshkumar	1,011	0.97	New
NTK	Anwar Baig	902	0.87	New
Margin of victory		4,836	4.64	−16.42
Turnout		104,238	55.40	−7.74
Registered electors		188,171		
DMK gain from AIADMK		Swing	-15.53	

=== 2011 ===
2011 Tamil Nadu Legislative Assembly election: Harbour
Party	Candidate	Votes	%	±%
AIADMK	Pala. Karuppiah	53,920	55.89	New
DMK	Altaf Hussain	33,603	34.83	−9.41
BJP	M. Jaisankar	4,663	4.83	+1.67
SDPI	P. Mohamed Hussain	2,237	2.32	New
Independent	Praveen Maheshwari	761	0.79	New
Margin of victory		20,317	21.06	20.38
Turnout		96,475	63.13	6.05
Registered electors		152,817		
AIADMK gain from DMK		Swing	11.65	

=== 2006 ===
2006 Tamil Nadu Legislative Assembly election: Harbour
Party	Candidate	Votes	%	±%
DMK	K. Anbazhagan	26,545	44.24	−2.74
MDMK	H. Seema Basheer	26,135	43.55	+39.21
DMDK	C. Chandra Prakasam	4,781	7.97	New
BJP	V. Vaithialingam	1,896	3.16	New
Margin of victory		410	0.68	0.03
Turnout		60,005	57.09	17.16
Registered electors		105,115		
DMK hold		Swing	-2.74	

=== 2001 ===
2001 Tamil Nadu Legislative Assembly election: Harbour
Party	Candidate	Votes	%	±%
DMK	K. Anbazhagan	24,225	46.98	−23.59
CPI	D. Pandian	23,889	46.33	New
MDMK	E. B. Pandian	2,239	4.34	−3.88
Puratchi Bharatham	D. Chandrakumar	490	0.95	New
Independent	R. T. Rathnakumar	404	0.78	New
Independent	P. N. Srinivasalu	316	0.61	New
Margin of victory		336	0.65	−53.73
Turnout		51,563	39.92	−14.99
Registered electors		129,157		
DMK hold		Swing	-23.59	

=== 1996 ===
1996 Tamil Nadu Legislative Assembly election: Harbour
Party	Candidate	Votes	%	±%
DMK	K. Anbazhagan	39,263	70.57	+21.91
INC	Earnest Paul	9,007	16.19	−31.07
MDMK	H. Basheer Ahamed	4,576	8.22	New
BJP	K. Dhananjayan	2,352	4.23	+1.45
Margin of victory		30,256	54.38	52.98
Turnout		55,638	54.91	1.72
Registered electors		103,285		
DMK hold		Swing	21.91	

=== 1991 by-election ===
1991 Tamil Nadu Legislative Assembly by-elections: Harbour
Party	Candidate	Votes	%	±%
DMK	A. Selvarasan	19,347	53.05	+4.35
INC	K. Suppu	16,111	44.18	−3.12
Independent	A.. K. Tajudeen	606	1.66	New
Margin of victory		3,236	8.87	7.49
Turnout		36,467	30.13	−23.06
Registered electors		1,21,040		
DMK hold		Swing	+4.35	

=== 1991 ===
1991 Tamil Nadu Legislative Assembly election: Harbour
Party	Candidate	Votes	%	±%
DMK	M. Karunanidhi	30,932	48.66	−11.09
INC	K. Suppu	30,042	47.26	New
BJP	V. Jayapaul	1,763	2.77	+0.26
Margin of victory		890	1.40	−44.52
Turnout		63,564	53.19	−13.28
Registered electors		121,040		
DMK hold		Swing	-11.09	

=== 1989 ===
1989 Tamil Nadu Legislative Assembly election: Harbour
Party	Candidate	Votes	%	±%
DMK	M. Karunanidhi	41,632	59.76	+4.46
IUML	K. A. Wahab	9,641	13.84	New
AIADMK	C. P. Pattabiraman	8,086	11.61	−31.91
AIADMK	Thuraimugam Khaja Mohideen	7,055	10.13	−33.38
BJP	J. Madanagopal Rao	1,752	2.51	New
Independent	M. S. Balasubramaniam	401	0.58	New
Margin of victory		31,991	45.92	34.13
Turnout		69,669	66.47	6.02
Registered electors		106,293		
DMK hold		Swing	4.46	

=== 1984 ===
1984 Tamil Nadu Legislative Assembly election: Harbour
Party	Candidate	Votes	%	±%
DMK	A. Selvarasan	38,953	55.30	+1.16
AIADMK	K. Liakath Ali Khan	30,649	43.51	+7.6
INC(J)	V. Girinath	462	0.66	New
Margin of victory		8,304	11.79	−6.44
Turnout		70,439	60.45	5.94
Registered electors		118,648		
DMK hold		Swing	1.16	

=== 1980 ===
1980 Tamil Nadu Legislative Assembly election: Harbour
Party	Candidate	Votes	%	±%
DMK	A. Selvarasan	32,716	54.14	+17.43
AIADMK	Dr. Habibullah Baig	21,701	35.91	New
JP	T. S. Balasundaram	5,706	9.44	New
Independent	M. Sivashanmugam	307	0.51	New
Margin of victory		11,015	18.23	9.02
Turnout		60,430	54.51	10.97
Registered electors		112,040		
DMK hold		Swing	17.43	

=== 1977 ===
1977 Tamil Nadu Legislative Assembly election: Harbour
Party	Candidate	Votes	%	±%
DMK	A. Selvarasan	23,845	36.71	New
Independent	M. M. Peer Mohammed	17,862	27.50	New
JP	K. P. Shaik Tahmbi	13,002	20.02	New
INC	K. Arumugam	9,500	14.62	−33.99
Margin of victory		5,983	9.21	8.39
Turnout		64,959	43.54	−23.99
Registered electors		150,577		
DMK gain from Independent		Swing	-12.73	

=== 1971 ===
1971 Tamil Nadu Legislative Assembly election: Harbour
Party	Candidate	Votes	%	±%
Independent	A. M. Mohideen	29,225	49.44	New
INC	G. Umapathy	28,739	48.62	+3.71
Independent	Habibullah Baig	1,151	1.95	New
Margin of victory		486	0.82	−5.96
Turnout		59,115	67.52	−5.16
Registered electors		90,850		
Independent hold		Swing	-2.25	

=== 1967 ===
1967 Madras Legislative Assembly election: Harbour
Party	Candidate	Votes	%	±%
Independent	Habibullah Baig	29,360	51.69	New
INC	K. S. G. Haja Shareef	25,510	44.91	−4.96
ABJS	Motilal	1,935	3.41	New
Margin of victory		3,850	6.78	0.66
Turnout		56,805	72.68	1.00
Registered electors		80,590		
Independent gain from INC		Swing	1.82	

=== 1962 ===
1962 Madras Legislative Assembly election: Harbour
Party	Candidate	Votes	%	±%
INC	K. S. G. Haja Shareef	26,330	49.87	−5.12
DMK	C. P. Chinnaraj	23,098	43.74	New
SWA	B. Krishnamurthy	3,374	6.39	New
Margin of victory		3,232	6.12	−20.35
Turnout		52,802	71.69	33.81
Registered electors		76,172		
INC hold		Swing	-5.12	

=== 1957 ===
1957 Madras Legislative Assembly election: Harbour
Party	Candidate	Votes	%	±%
INC	Dr. U. Krishna Rao	15,831	54.99	+8.31
PSP	G. Rajamannar Chettiar	8,209	28.51	New
Independent	Kannan	4,750	16.50	New
Margin of victory		7,622	26.47	4.47
Turnout		28,790	37.87	−16.78
Registered electors		76,022		
INC hold		Swing	8.31	

=== 1952 ===
1952 Madras Legislative Assembly election: Harbour
Party	Candidate	Votes	%	±%
INC	Dr. U. Krishna Rao	21,314	46.68	New
Independent	Ibrahim Saheb	11,264	24.67	New
KMPP	Prakasam	7,287	15.96	New
AIFB	Rajamannar Chetty	2,698	5.91	New
Independent	Rajagopalachari	1,819	3.98	New
Independent	Bashyam	649	1.42	New
Independent	Parasurama Naicker	285	0.62	New
Margin of victory		10,050	22.01	
Turnout		45,663	54.65	
Registered electors		83,559		
INC win (new seat)				
