= Villivakkam Assembly constituency =

State Legislative Assembly Constituency in Tamil Nadu

Coordinates: 13.1101°N 80.2095°E

Villivakkam
- Constituency No. 14 for the Tamil Nadu Legislative Assembly
- Interactive map outlining Villivakkam assembly constituency in Chennai district

Constituency details
- Country: India
- Region: South India
- State: Tamil Nadu
- District: Chennai
- Lok Sabha constituency: Chennai Central
- Established: 1977
- Total electors: 163,372

Member of Legislative Assembly
- 17th Tamil Nadu Legislative Assembly
- Incumbent Aadhav Arjuna
- Party: TVK
- Elected year: 2026

Villivakkam is a legislative assembly constituency in the Indian state of Tamil Nadu. Its State Assembly Constituency number is 14. It consists of a portion of Chennai and falls under Chennai Central Lok Sabha constituency. It is one of the 234 State Legislative Assembly Constituencies in Tamil Nadu, in India.

== Members of Legislative Assembly ==
Year	Winner	Party
1977	K. Suppu	Dravida Munnetra Kazhagam
1980	J. C. D. Prabhakar	All India Anna Dravida Munnetra Kazhagam
1984	V. P. Chinthan	Communist Party of India
1989	W. R. Varadarajan	Communist Party of India
1991	E. Kalan	Indian National Congress
1996	J. M. Aaroon Rashid	Tamil Maanila Congress
2001	D. Napoleon	Dravida Munnetra Kazhagam
2006	B. Ranganathan	Dravida Munnetra Kazhagam
2011	J. C. D. Prabhakar	All India Anna Dravida Munnetra Kazhagam
2016	B. Ranganathan	Dravida Munnetra Kazhagam
2021	A. Vetriazhagan	Dravida Munnetra Kazhagam
2026	Aadhav Arjuna	Tamilaga Vettri Kazhagam

== Overview ==
As per orders of the Delimitation Commission, No. 14 Villivakkam Assembly constituency is composed of Ward 55-58 & 63-64 of Greater Chennai Corporation.

== Election results ==
Vote share of winning candidates
2026	46.97%
2021	53.37%
2016	43.96%
2011	52.44%
2006	45.63%
2001	48.21%
1996	70.24%
1991	55.49%
1989	46.77%
1984	48.21%
1980	47.84%
1977	41.07%

=== 2026 ===
2026 Tamil Nadu Legislative Assembly election: Villivakkam
Party	Candidate	Votes	%	±%
TVK	Aadhav Arjuna	66,445	46.97	New
DMK	Karthik Mohan	49,143	34.74	−18.63
AIADMK	S. R. Vijayakumar	19,338	13.67	−13.59
NTK	Roshini	4,310	3.05	−4.6
NOTA	NOTA	695	0.49	−0.52
Margin of victory		17,302	12.23	−13.87
Turnout		141,452	86.58	+30.70
Rejected ballots				
Registered electors		163,372		
TVK gain from DMK		Swing		

=== 2021 ===
2021 Tamil Nadu Legislative Assembly election: Villivakkam
Party	Candidate	Votes	%	±%
DMK	A. Vetriazhagan	76,127	53.37	+9.41
AIADMK	J. C. D. Prabhakar	38,890	27.26	−10.48
MNM	Sriharan	13,364	9.37	New
NTK	R. Sridar	10,914	7.65	+5.65
NOTA	NOTA	1,444	1.01	−1.26
DMDK	D. Subamangalam	1,094	0.77	−4.72
Margin of victory		37,237	26.10	19.89
Turnout		142,648	55.88	−4.00
Rejected ballots		881	0.62	
Registered electors		255,278		
DMK hold		Swing	9.41	

=== 2016 ===
2016 Tamil Nadu Legislative Assembly election: Villivakkam
Party	Candidate	Votes	%	±%
DMK	B. Ranganathan	65,972	43.96	−0.25
AIADMK	Thadi M. Raju	56,651	37.75	−14.7
DMDK	T. Pandiyan	8,234	5.49	New
BJP	M. Jaishankar	6,438	4.29	+2.88
PMK	G. V. Subramaniyan	4,193	2.79	New
NOTA	NOTA	3,409	2.27	New
NTK	A. Vagai Venthan	3,002	2.00	New
YSRCP	K. M. Sucharitha	952	0.63	New
Margin of victory		9,321	6.21	−2.03
Turnout		150,084	59.88	−7.83
Registered electors		250,657		
DMK gain from AIADMK		Swing	-8.49	

=== 2011 ===
2011 Tamil Nadu Legislative Assembly election: Villivakkam
Party	Candidate	Votes	%	±%
AIADMK	J. C. D. Prabhakar	68,612	52.44	+11.74
DMK	K. Anbazhagan	57,830	44.20	−1.43
BJP	D. Masana Muthu	1,850	1.41	−0.09
Margin of victory		10,782	8.24	3.31
Turnout		130,828	67.71	2.78
Registered electors		193,221		
AIADMK gain from DMK		Swing	6.81	

=== 2006 ===
2006 Tamil Nadu Legislative Assembly election: Villivakkam
Party	Candidate	Votes	%	±%
DMK	B. Ranganathan	278,850	45.63	−2.57
AIADMK	G. Kalan	248,734	40.70	New
DMDK	G. Velmurugan	51,892	8.49	New
BJP	S. Ravisundaram	9,202	1.51	New
LKPT	K. Prema	6,473	1.06	New
Margin of victory		30,116	4.93	2.23
Turnout		611,084	64.93	23.22
Registered electors		941,112		
DMK hold		Swing	-2.57	

=== 2001 ===
2001 Tamil Nadu Legislative Assembly election: Villivakkam
Party	Candidate	Votes	%	±%
DMK	D. Napoleon	164,787	48.21	New
TMC(M)	Dr. A. Chellakumar	155,557	45.51	New
MDMK	J. Sivaprakasam	12,112	3.54	−2.76
Puratchi Bharatham	P. Josuva	3,139	0.92	New
Margin of victory		9,230	2.70	−50.66
Turnout		341,835	41.71	−9.59
Registered electors		819,547		
DMK gain from TMC(M)		Swing	-22.03	

=== 1996 ===
1996 Tamil Nadu Legislative Assembly election: Villivakkam
Party	Candidate	Votes	%	±%
TMC(M)	J. M. Aaroon Rashid	194,471	70.24	New
INC	M. G. Mohan	46,724	16.88	−38.62
MDMK	M. Venugopal	17,463	6.31	New
BJP	D. Selvam	6,714	2.42	−0.37
CPI(ML)L	S. Kumarasamy	3,384	1.22	New
Independent	P. Sivakumar	3,107	1.12	New
Margin of victory		147,747	53.36	31.66
Turnout		276,880	51.30	0.36
Registered electors		551,942		
TMC(M) gain from INC		Swing	14.74	

=== 1991 ===
1991 Tamil Nadu Legislative Assembly election: Villivakkam
Party	Candidate	Votes	%	±%
INC	E. Kalan	118,196	55.49	+40.36
CPI(M)	W. R. Varadarajan	71,963	33.79	−12.99
PMK	Govindaraj	11,635	5.46	New
BJP	Gaanasekar	5,953	2.79	New
Independent	Kumarasamy	1,380	0.65	New
INS(SCS)	Abu Bucker	1,192	0.56	New
Margin of victory		46,233	21.71	−6.21
Turnout		212,993	50.94	−11.80
Registered electors		428,210		
INC gain from CPI(M)		Swing	8.72	

=== 1989 ===
1989 Tamil Nadu Legislative Assembly election: Villivakkam
Party	Candidate	Votes	%	±%
CPI(M)	W. R. Varadarajan	99,571	46.77	−1.44
AIADMK	D. Balasubramaniam	40,150	18.86	−28.73
INC	N. M. Manivarama	32,211	15.13	New
AIADMK	J. C. D. Prabhakar	30,322	14.24	−33.35
Independent	K. Narayanan	1,855	0.87	New
Independent	M. Senthivelayadam	1,266	0.59	New
Margin of victory		59,421	27.91	27.29
Turnout		212,886	62.74	−4.20
Registered electors		343,571		
CPI(M) hold		Swing	-1.44	

=== 1984 ===
1984 Tamil Nadu Legislative Assembly election: Villivakkam
Party	Candidate	Votes	%	±%
CPI(M)	V. P. Chintan	81,595	48.21	New
AIADMK	J. C. D. Prabhakar	80,549	47.59	−0.25
Independent	M. Mohan	4,295	2.54	New
Margin of victory		1,046	0.62	0.03
Turnout		169,247	66.94	4.01
Registered electors		257,909		
CPI(M) gain from AIADMK		Swing	0.37	

=== 1980 ===
1980 Tamil Nadu Legislative Assembly election: Villivakkam
Party	Candidate	Votes	%	±%
AIADMK	J. C. D. Prabhakar	57,192	47.84	+15.46
DMK	K. Suppu	56,489	47.25	+6.18
JP	R. Kanakasabai	5,235	4.38	New
Margin of victory		703	0.59	−8.10
Turnout		119,548	62.94	7.36
Registered electors		191,966		
AIADMK gain from DMK		Swing	6.77	

=== 1977 ===
1977 Tamil Nadu Legislative Assembly election: Villivakkam
Party	Candidate	Votes	%	±%
DMK	K. Suppu	37,327	41.07	New
AIADMK	R. Sarweshwar Rao	29,429	32.38	New
JP	M. G. Pandurangan	16,518	18.17	New
INC	V. R. Bhagavan	6,477	7.13	New
Margin of victory		7,898	8.69	
Turnout		90,891	55.58	
Registered electors		165,872		
DMK win (new seat)				
