= Arcot N. Veeraswami =

Indian politician (born 1931)

Minister for Electricity (Government of Tamil Nadu)
- In office 13 May 2006 – 15 May 2011
- Chief Minister: M. Karunanidhi

Minister for Rural Industries (Government of Tamil Nadu)
- In office 13 May 2006 – 21 August 2007
- Chief Minister: M. Karunanidhi

Minister for Electricity and Health (Government of Tamil Nadu)
- In office 13 May 1996 – 13 May 2001
- Chief Minister: M. Karunanidhi

Minister for Food (Government of Tamil Nadu)
- In office 27 January 1989 – 30 January 1991
- Chief Minister: M. Karunanidhi

Headquarters Principal Secretary of Dravida Munnetra Kazhagam
- In office 27 December 2008 – 8 January 2015
- Leader: M. Karunanidhi
- General Secretary: K. Anbazhagan
- Preceded by: Durai Murugan
- Succeeded by: Durai Murugan

Treasurer of Dravida Munnetra Kazhagam
- In office 12 May 1994 – 26 December 2008
- Leader: M. Karunanidhi
- General Secretary: K. Anbazhagan
- Preceded by: S. J. Sadiq Pasha
- Succeeded by: M. K. Stalin

Personal details
- Born: 21 April 1931 (age 95) Kuppadichatham, North Arcot, Tamil Nadu, India
- Party: Dravida Munnetra Kazhagam
- Spouse: Kasturi
- Children: Kalanidhi Veeraswamy MP, Arcot GajaRajan Veerasamy Business Man, Daughter Mrs Indumathi Veerasamy Industrialist
- Nickname: Arcotar

Arcot N. Veeraswami is a politician and a former minister for electricity in the Tamil Nadu State of India. He became the treasurer of the Dravida Munnetra Kazhagam Party and emerged as number three in the party after Karunanidhi and K Anbazhagan in the early 1980s. He was treated as the right-hand person to Karunanidhi and was also said to be the main peacemaker in the party. He was born in a Kamma family in Kuppadichatham village in North Arcot district in Tamil Nadu on 21 April 1931 to Narayanasamy Naidu and Jeyammal. He finished his education before actively engaging in politics. He was elected to the Tamil Nadu assembly six times. From 1989 to 1991, during the DMK rule, he served as the Minister for Food. Veeraswamy was the Minister for Health & Electricity between 1996 and 2001. Furthermore, between 2006 and 2011, he served as the Minister for Electricity and Rural Industries.

== Politics ==
Veerasamy worked as a clerk in the state electricity board before being handpicked by DMK's founder, C N Annadurai, as a candidate for the Arcot constituency in 1967; after which he became the treasurer of the DMK Party and emerged as number three in the party after Karunanidhi and K Anbazhagan in the early 80s. Following his rise in popularity, Veerasamy rose in the party's ranks and was unanimously elected as the Treasurer of Dravida Munnetras Kazhagam in 1994 to 2008. He has been a member of the Dravida Munnetra Kazhagam party and has been elected to the Tamil Nadu assembly six times. He has participated in several agitations against oppression staged by Dravida Munnetra Kazhagam, and has courted arrest several times, the most notable being MISA in 1976 when he was arrested and tortured for one year. He lost his hearing in one ear. He was elected as a Member of the Legislative Assembly from Arcot constituency in 1967 and 1971, Purasaiwalkam constituency in 1989, and Annanagar constituency in 1996, 2001, and 2006 in the General elections. He also served as a Member of the Legislative Council from 1977 to 1988.

He was sworn in as Minister of the Govt of Tamil Nadu thrice: as Minister for Food in 1989, Minister for Health and Electricity in 1996, and Minister for Electricity and Rural Industries in 2006.

== Elections Contested ==
=== Tamil Nadu Legislative Assembly Elections ===
Elections	Constituency	Party	Result	Vote percentage	Opposition candidate	Opposition party	Opposition vote percentage
1967	Arcot	DMK	Won	60.13	A. G. R. Naicker	INC	37.16
1971	Arcot	DMK	Won	57.79	N. R. Ethirajalu Naidu	INC	37.02
1984	Arcot	DMK	Lost	38.96	T. Palani	AIADMK	58.96
1989	Purasawalkam	DMK	Won	49.88	B. Ranganathan	AIADMK(J)	22.07
1991	Purasawalkam	DMK	Lost	26.99	B. Ranganathan	INC	39.68
1996	Anna Nagar	DMK	Won	67.05	R. Balasubramanian	INC	22.48
2001	Anna Nagar	DMK	Won	48.20	C. Arumugam	PMK	44.73
2006	Anna Nagar	DMK	Won	46.20	Vijaya Thayanban	MDMK	40.48

=== Tamil Nadu Legislative Council Elections Contested ===
Year	Election	Party	PC Name	Result
1977	Tamil Nadu Legislative Council	DMK	Tamil Nadu	Won
1984	Tamil Nadu Legislative Council	DMK	Tamil Nadu	Won
