= Purasawalkam Assembly constituency =

Constituency in Tamil Nadu, India, 1962–2008

Coordinates: 13.08593°N 80.25047°E

Purasuwalkam
- Former constituency for the Tamil Nadu Legislative Assembly

Constituency details
- Country: India
- Region: South India
- State: Tamil Nadu
- District: Chennai
- Lok Sabha constituency: Chennai Central
- Established: 1962
- Abolished: 2008
- Total electors: 167,730 (2006)
- Reservation: None

Purusawalkam is a defunct legislative assembly constituency, that includes the locality, Purasawalkam of Chennai City and its surroundings. Purasawalkam Assembly constituency was part of Chennai Central Lok Sabha constituency.It was later divided between Egmore and newly created Thiru-Vi-Ka Nagar assembly constituencies.

== Members of the Legislative Assembly ==
=== Madras State ===
| Year | Winner | Party |
|---|---|---|
| 1962 | Bashyam Reddy | Indian National Congress |
| 1967 | V. S. Govindarajan | Dravida Munnetra Kazhagam |

=== Tamil Nadu ===
| Year | Duration | Winner | Party |
|---|---|---|---|
| 1971 | 1971–77 | K. Anbazhagan | Dravida Munnetra Kazhagam |
| 1977 | 1977–80 | K. Anbazhagan | Dravida Munnetra Kazhagam |
| 1980 | 1980–84 | K. Anbazhagan | Dravida Munnetra Kazhagam |
| 1984 | 1984–89 | K. Nanjil Manoharan | Dravida Munnetra Kazhagam |
| 1989 | 1989–91 | Arcot N. Veeraswami | Dravida Munnetra Kazhagam |
| 1991 | 1991–96 | B. Ranganathan | Indian National Congress |
| 1996 | 1996–01 | B. Ranganathan | Tamil Maanila Congress |
| 2001 | 2001–06 | B. Ranganathan | Indian National Congress |
| 2006 | 2006–2011 | V.S. Babu | Dravida Munnetra Kazhagam |

== Election results ==
=== 2006 ===
2006 Tamil Nadu Legislative Assembly election: Purasawalkam
| Party | Candidate | Votes | % | ±% |
|---|---|---|---|---|
| DMK | V. S. Babu | 90,140 | 53.74 | |
| AIADMK | T. G. Venkatesh Babu | 82,777 | 49.35 | |
| DMDK | Jacquelene Gomez | 12,690 | 7.57 | |
| BJP | Elumalai. V. | 2,019 | 1.20 | |
| SWA | Kamalaakannan. J. | 769 | 0.46 | |
| Independent | Raja. K. | 603 | 0.36 | |
| Margin of victory | | 7,363 | 4.39 | 1.74 |
| Turnout | | 167,730 | 87.51 | −45.83 |
| DMK hold | | Swing | 5.21 | |

=== 2001 ===
2001 Tamil Nadu Legislative Assembly election: Purasawalkam
| Party | Candidate | Votes | % | ±% |
|---|---|---|---|---|
| DMK | B. Ranganathan | 69,681 | 48.53 | |
| TMC(M) | P. Vetrivel | 65,879 | 45.89 | |
| MDMK | Gurunathan S | 4,902 | 3.41 | |
| JD(S) | Antony Xavier R | 1,033 | 0.72 | |
| Independent | Venkataramani J | 598 | 0.42 | |
| Independent | Peter Solomon | 389 | 0.27 | |
| Margin of victory | | 3,802 | 2.65 | −49.58 |
| Turnout | | 143,574 | 46.71 | −11.55 |
| DMK gain from TMC(M) | | Swing | -22.07 | |

=== 1996 ===
1996 Tamil Nadu Legislative Assembly election: Purasawalkam
| Party | Candidate | Votes | % | ±% |
|---|---|---|---|---|
| TMC(M) | B. Ranganathan | 98,157 | 70.61 | |
| INC | Gnanam. J. Kathipara | 25,543 | 18.37 | |
| BJP | Ethirajan. G. | 9,128 | 6.57 | |
| MDMK | Dhakshina Murthy. K. | 2,623 | 1.89 | |
| PMK | Nadesan. M. | 1,604 | 1.15 | |
| Independent | Gnana Sekar. A. | 657 | 0.47 | |
| Margin of victory | | 72,614 | 52.23 | 34.39 |
| Turnout | | 139,022 | 58.26 | 2.18 |
| TMC(M) gain from INC | | Swing | 14.83 | |

=== 1991 ===
1991 Tamil Nadu Legislative Assembly election: Purasawalkam
| Party | Candidate | Votes | % | ±% |
|---|---|---|---|---|
| INC | B. Ranganathan | 71,391 | 39.68 | |
| DMK | Arcot N. Veeraswami | 48,559 | 26.99 | |
| PMK | Manivannan R. | 3,656 | 20.32 | |
| BJP | Selvaraj B. | 3,120 | 17.34 | |
| JP | Sagunthala B. | 243 | 1.35 | |
| Independent | Elango S. | 206 | 1.14 | |
| Margin of victory | | 22,832 | 17.84 | −9.97 |
| Turnout | | 127,992 | 56.08 | −12.16 |
| INC gain from DMK | | Swing | 5.90 | |

=== 1989 ===
1989 Tamil Nadu Legislative Assembly election: Purasawalkam
| Party | Candidate | Votes | % | ±% |
|---|---|---|---|---|
| DMK | Arcot N. Veeraswami | 68,640 | 49.88 | |
| AIADMK | B. Ranganathan | 30,376 | 22.07 | |
| Independent | Anbarasu. C. | 29,962 | 21.77 | |
| BJP | Purasai Kumaran | 5,169 | 3.76 | |
| Independent | Meiyappan. R. | 1,130 | 0.82 | |
| Independent | Mahendran. K. | 319 | 0.23 | |
| Margin of victory | | 38,264 | 27.81 | 24.04 |
| Turnout | | 137,613 | 68.24 | 1.73 |
| DMK hold | | Swing | -1.26 | |

=== 1984 ===
1984 Tamil Nadu Legislative Assembly election: Purasawalkam
| Party | Candidate | Votes | % | ±% |
|---|---|---|---|---|
| DMK | Nanjil K. Manoharan | 61,246 | 51.14 | |
| AIADMK | Suppu. K. | 56,736 | 47.37 | |
| Independent | Dhanapal R. H. | 482 | 0.40 | |
| Independent | Manivannan. D. | 206 | 0.17 | |
| Independent | Selyamary. S. | 200 | 0.17 | |
| Independent | Munirathinam. E. | 196 | 0.16 | |
| Margin of victory | | 4,510 | 3.77 | −1.90 |
| Turnout | | 119,763 | 66.51 | 6.74 |
| DMK hold | | Swing | -1.21 | |

=== 1980 ===
1980 Tamil Nadu Legislative Assembly election: Purasawalkam
| Party | Candidate | Votes | % | ±% |
|---|---|---|---|---|
| DMK | K. Anbazhagan | 52,729 | 52.35 | |
| AIADMK | Valampuri John | 47,021 | 46.68 | |
| JP | Manivannan.D | 535 | 0.53 | |
| Independent | Mani.D | 439 | 0.44 | |
| Margin of victory | | 5,708 | 5.67 | −15.27 |
| Turnout | | 100,724 | 59.77 | 14.50 |
| DMK hold | | Swing | 7.26 | |

=== 1977 ===
1977 Tamil Nadu Legislative Assembly election: Purasawalkam
| Party | Candidate | Votes | % | ±% |
|---|---|---|---|---|
| DMK | K. Anbazhagan | 41,073 | 45.09 | |
| JP | T. S. Govindaswamy | 22,004 | 24.16 | |
| ADK | P.A. Venkateshwaralu | 19,745 | 21.68 | |
| CPI | R. Dakshinamoorthy | 7,206 | 7.91 | |
| Independent | H. Stanley | 265 | 0.29 | |
| Independent | Rajesekharan | 248 | 0.27 | |
| Margin of victory | | 19,069 | 20.94 | 6.46 |
| Turnout | | 91,085 | 45.27 | −18.47 |
| DMK hold | | Swing | -11.03 | |

=== 1971 ===
1971 Tamil Nadu Legislative Assembly election: Purasawalkam
| Party | Candidate | Votes | % | ±% |
|---|---|---|---|---|
| DMK | K. Anbazhagan | 47,182 | 56.13 | |
| INC | Bashyam Reddy | 35,016 | 41.65 | |
| Independent | M Deenan | 1,865 | 2.22 | |
| Margin of victory | | 12,166 | 14.47 | 7.18 |
| Turnout | | 84,063 | 63.74 | −10.63 |
| DMK hold | | Swing | -1.91 | |

=== 1967 ===
1967 Madras Legislative Assembly election: Purasawalkam
| Party | Candidate | Votes | % | ±% |
|---|---|---|---|---|
| DMK | V. S. Govindarajan | 41,272 | 58.04 | |
| INC | Damodaran | 29,046 | 40.85 | |
| ABJS | Krishniah | 792 | 1.11 | |
| Margin of victory | | 12,226 | 7.29 | |
| Turnout | | 71,110 | 74.37 | |
| DMK gain from | | Swing | | |
