= Tamil Nadu Arasu Cable TV Corporation Limited =

State-owned cable television provider in Tamil Nadu, India

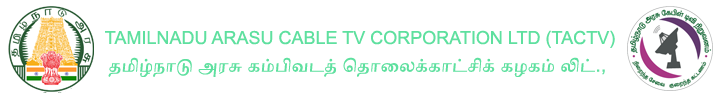
- Company type: A Government of Tamil Nadu's Public Sector Undertaking
- Founded: 4 October 2007
- Headquarters: 11/22, Mangadu Sami Street, Nungambakkam, Chennai– 600034, India
- Area served: Tamil Nadu
- Key people: Dr. Neeraj Mittal IAS (Chairman)
- Owner: Government of Tamil Nadu
- Parent: Department of Information Technology (Tamil Nadu)
- Website: www.tactv.in

Tamil Nadu Arasu Cable TV Corporation Limited (TNACTCL) (Tamil: தமிழ் நாடு அரசு கம்பிவட தொலைக்காட்சி கழகம் (வரையறுக்கப்பட்டது)) is a state-government Public Sector Undertaking of Government of Tamil Nadu located in the Indian state of Tamil Nadu. TNACTCL is a cable television operator across the state. It was founded in 2007.

== TACTV Operation ==
Arasu Cable TV Corporation was incorporated on 4 October 2007 with the objective of providing cable TV signals to the public. In order to achieve this objective, four Digital Head Ends were installed at Thanjavur, Tirunelveli, Coimbatore and Vellore.

After assuming office in May 2011, the Chief Minister of Tamil Nadu revived the Arasu Cable TV Corporation which had become defunct due to various reasons and sanctioned a sum of ₹3 Crores for the revival and expansion of the activities of the corporation. The corporation was renamed as Tamil Nadu Arasu Cable TV Corporation Limited (TACTV).

TACTV has taken on lease the Head Ends of the willing private Multi System Operators in 27 Districts of the State and revamped its existing four digital Head Ends in 4 Districts.

On 30.08.2011, the Chief Minister of Tamil Nadu had announced on the floor of the Assembly that TACTV would provide services at a cost of ₹180 as monthly subscription to the subscribers through the cable TV would collect ₹20 per month per subscriber from the Cable Operators.

The Chief Minister of Tamil Nadu launched the cable TV services all over Tamil Nadu (except Chennai) on 02.09.2011 by switching-on the Head End at Vellore through Video Conferencing. On 20.10.2012, the Chief Minister inaugurated the Cable TV Services of TACTV in Chennai Metro.

At present TACTV is providing the Cable TV services with 99-100 Channels, including Free-to-Air Channels, Pay Channels and Private Local Channels. The corporation has procured 137 pay Channels and almost all the Pay channels are in the bouquet of the corporation.

Before TACTV's existence, the cable TV sector was unorganized and a few Multi System Operators had created monopoly and thereby forced the local Cable TV operators as well as the public to pay exorbitant amount towards cable TV services. Earlier, the public were paying ₹150 to ₹250 per month to the private Cable TV companies to avail the cable TV service.

The service being provided by TACTV is welfare step taken by the Government, in the interest of the public and cable TV operators. Now TACTV is providing the Cable TV services with most of the pay channels, at an affordable cost of ₹120 per month, to the public through cable operators and the public could save a sum of ₹80 to ₹180 per month. Therefore, the public have overwhelmingly welcomed TACTV's cable TV services.

TACTV has selected 1200 private local channels and issued allotment orders, out of which approximately 800 are running through TACTV.
