= Thousand Lights Assembly constituency =

State Legislative Assembly Constituency in Tamil Nadu

Coordinates: 13.061°N 80.252°E

Thousand Lights
- Constituency No. 20 for the Tamil Nadu Legislative Assembly

Constituency details
- Country: India
- Region: South India
- State: Tamil Nadu
- District: Chennai
- Lok Sabha constituency: Chennai Central
- Established: 1951
- Total electors: 157,529
- Reservation: None

Member of Legislative Assembly
- 17th Tamil Nadu Legislative Assembly
- Incumbent J. C. D. Prabhakar; Speaker of the Tamil Nadu Legislative Assembly
- Party: TVK
- Elected year: 2026

Thousand Lights is a constituency of the legislative assembly of the Indian state of Tamil Nadu. Its State Assembly Constituency number is 20. It forms a part of Chennai Central Lok Sabha constituency for national elections to the Parliament of India. It is one of the 234 State Legislative Assembly Constituencies in Tamil Nadu.

== Overview ==
As per orders of the Delimitation Commission, No. 20 Thousand Lights Assembly constituency is composed of Ward 76-78, 107-110, 112-114, 118 & 119 of Greater Chennai Corporation.

== Members of Legislative Assembly ==
=== Madras State ===
Year	Winner	Party
1952	Venkatasami Naidu	Indian National Congress
1957	A. V. P. Asaithambi	Independent
1962	K. A. Mathialagan	Dravida Munnetra Kazhagam
1967	K. A. Mathialagan	Dravida Munnetra Kazhagam

=== Tamil Nadu ===
Assembly	Election	Winner	Party
Fifth	1971	K. A. Mathialagan	Dravida Munnetra Kazhagam
Sixth	1977	S. J. Sadiq Pasha	Dravida Munnetra Kazhagam
Seventh	1980	K. A. Krishnaswamy	All India Anna Dravida Munnetra Kazhagam
Eighth	1984	K. A. Krishnaswamy	All India Anna Dravida Munnetra Kazhagam
Ninth	1989	M. K. Stalin	Dravida Munnetra Kazhagam
Tenth	1991	K. A. Krishnaswamy	All India Anna Dravida Munnetra Kazhagam
Eleventh	1996	M. K. Stalin	Dravida Munnetra Kazhagam
Twelfth	2001	M. K. Stalin	Dravida Munnetra Kazhagam
Thirteenth	2006	M. K. Stalin	Dravida Munnetra Kazhagam
Fourteenth	2011	B. Valarmathi	All India Anna Dravida Munnetra Kazhagam
Fifteenth	2016	K. K. Selvam	Dravida Munnetra Kazhagam
Sixteenth	2021	Ezhilan Naganathan	Dravida Munnetra Kazhagam
Seventeenth	2026	J. C. D. Prabhakar	Tamilaga Vettri Kazhagam

== Election results ==
Vote share of winning candidates
2026	44.73%
2021	53.41%
2016	43.35%
2011	50.55%
2006	46.00%
2001	51.41%
1996	69.72%
1991	56.50%
1989	50.59%
1984	50.36%
1980	50.19%
1977	37.13%
1971	57.39%
1962	45.59%
1957	54.08%
1952	24.64%

=== 2026 ===
2026 Tamil Nadu Legislative Assembly election: Thousand Lights
Party	Candidate	Votes	%	±%
TVK	J. C. D. Prabhakar	58,965	44.73	New
DMK	Ezhilan Naganathan	43,824	33.24	−20.17
AIADMK	B. Valarmathi	23,320	17.69	−19.46
NTK	Kalanjiyam	3,717	2.82	−3.78
NOTA	NOTA	815	0.62	−0.41
Margin of victory		15,141	11.48	−12.65
Turnout		131,824	83.68	+27.63
Rejected ballots				
Registered electors		157,529		
TVK gain from DMK		Swing		

=== 2021 ===
2021 Tamil Nadu Legislative Assembly election: Thousand Lights
Party	Candidate	Votes	%	±%
DMK	Ezhilan Naganathan	71,867	53.41	+10.06
BJP	Khushbu	39,405	29.29	+23.31
MNM	K. M. Shariff	11,791	8.76	New
NTK	A. J. Sherine	8,884	6.60	+5.15
NOTA	NOTA	1,385	1.03	−1.52
AMMK	N. Vaidhyanathan	1,155	0.86	New
Margin of victory		32,462	24.13	17.93
Turnout		134,555	56.05	−4.36
Rejected ballots		733	0.54	
Registered electors		240,073		
DMK hold		Swing	10.06	

=== 2016 ===
2016 Tamil Nadu Legislative Assembly election: Thousand Lights
Party	Candidate	Votes	%	±%
DMK	Ku. Ka. Selvam	61,726	43.35	−1.52
AIADMK	B. Valarmathi	52,897	37.15	−13.41
BJP	M. Shivalingam	8,516	5.98	+3.66
MDMK	C. Ambigapathy	7,805	5.48	New
PMK	V. Rangan	3,968	2.79	New
NOTA	NOTA	3,633	2.55	New
NTK	Murugesan	2,075	1.46	New
Margin of victory		8,829	6.20	0.52
Turnout		142,403	60.41	−6.37
Registered electors		235,724		
DMK gain from AIADMK		Swing	-7.21	

=== 2011 ===
2011 Tamil Nadu Legislative Assembly election: Thousand Lights
Party	Candidate	Votes	%	±%
AIADMK	B. Valarmathi	67,522	50.55	+6.83
DMK	Hasan Mohamed Jinnah	59,930	44.87	−1.13
BJP	M. Photo Siva Alias Sivalingam	3,098	2.32	+1.11
IJK	Thiwan Muhammedu Nahib	849	0.64	New
Margin of victory		7,592	5.68	3.40
Turnout		133,567	66.78	2.89
Registered electors		200,020		
AIADMK gain from DMK		Swing	4.55	

=== 2006 ===
2006 Tamil Nadu Legislative Assembly election: Thousand Lights
Party	Candidate	Votes	%	±%
DMK	M. K. Stalin	49,817	46.00	−5.4
AIADMK	Adhirajaram	47,349	43.72	New
DMDK	M. Thalapathy	5,545	5.12	New
LKPT	A. Ishrayel Maheswar	2,459	2.27	New
BJP	M. Shivalingam	1,305	1.21	New
Margin of victory		2,468	2.28	−5.34
Turnout		108,291	63.89	18.55
Registered electors		169,506		
DMK hold		Swing	-5.40	

=== 2001 ===
2001 Tamil Nadu Legislative Assembly election: Thousand Lights
Party	Candidate	Votes	%	±%
DMK	M. K. Stalin	49,056	51.41	−18.31
TMC(M)	S. Sekar	41,782	43.78	New
MDMK	Mallika	2,511	2.63	+0.05
Independent	G. M. Syed Fasiuddin	539	0.56	New
Margin of victory		7,274	7.62	−39.14
Turnout		95,428	45.34	−13.36
Registered electors		210,474		
DMK hold		Swing	-18.31	

=== 1996 ===
1996 Tamil Nadu Legislative Assembly election: Thousand Lights
Party	Candidate	Votes	%	±%
DMK	M. K. Stalin	66,905	69.72	+30.52
AIADMK	Zeenath Sheriffdeen	22,028	22.95	−33.55
MDMK	K. Thiyagarajan	2,479	2.58	New
BJP	Nagamma	2,015	2.10	+0.29
PMK	N. Elumalai	1,457	1.52	New
Margin of victory		44,877	46.76	29.45
Turnout		95,968	58.70	2.38
Registered electors		167,016		
DMK gain from AIADMK		Swing	13.21	

=== 1991 ===
1991 Tamil Nadu Legislative Assembly election: Thousand Lights
Party	Candidate	Votes	%	±%
AIADMK	K. A. Krishnaswamy	55,426	56.50	+26.45
DMK	M. K. Stalin	38,445	39.19	−11.4
BJP	D. Nagarajan	1,771	1.81	New
PMK	B. Panneerselvam	1,273	1.30	New
Margin of victory		16,981	17.31	−3.23
Turnout		98,092	56.32	−11.49
Registered electors		176,708		
AIADMK gain from DMK		Swing	5.91	

=== 1989 ===
1989 Tamil Nadu Legislative Assembly election: Thousand Lights
Party	Candidate	Votes	%	±%
DMK	M. K. Stalin	50,818	50.59	+2.73
AIADMK	S. S. R. Thambidurai	30,184	30.05	−20.31
IUML	Mohamed Ehiya	10,349	10.30	New
AIADMK	G. M. Syed Fasiuddin	6,616	6.59	−43.77
Margin of victory		20,634	20.54	18.05
Turnout		100,448	67.81	2.85
Registered electors		150,057		
DMK gain from AIADMK		Swing	0.23	

=== 1984 ===
1984 Tamil Nadu Legislative Assembly election: Thousand Lights
Party	Candidate	Votes	%	±%
AIADMK	K. A. Krishnaswamy	46,246	50.36	+0.17
DMK	M. K. Stalin	43,954	47.86	−1.95
Independent	A. Seppan	854	0.93	New
Margin of victory		2,292	2.50	2.12
Turnout		91,831	64.96	7.38
Registered electors		145,099		
AIADMK hold		Swing	0.17	

=== 1980 ===
1980 Tamil Nadu Legislative Assembly election: Thousand Lights
Party	Candidate	Votes	%	±%
AIADMK	K. A. Krishnaswamy	40,499	50.19	New
DMK	S. J. Sadiq Pasha	40,192	49.81	+12.68
Margin of victory		307	0.38	−6.40
Turnout		80,691	57.58	14.41
Registered electors		141,773		
AIADMK gain from DMK		Swing	13.06	

=== 1977 ===
1977 Tamil Nadu Legislative Assembly election: Thousand Lights
Party	Candidate	Votes	%	±%
DMK	S. J. Sadiq Pasha	26,599	37.13	−20.26
Independent	Syed Khaleefa Thullah	21,741	30.35	New
JP	Anbumani	15,230	21.26	New
INC	P. A. Daivasigamani	7,902	11.03	−29.3
Margin of victory		4,858	6.78	−10.28
Turnout		71,635	43.16	−21.16
Registered electors		167,463		
DMK hold		Swing	-20.26	

=== 1971 ===
1971 Tamil Nadu Legislative Assembly election: Thousand Lights
Party	Candidate	Votes	%	±%
DMK	K. A. Mathiazhagan	38,891	57.39	−1.88
INC	N. M. Mani Varma	27,332	40.33	+2.28
Independent	K. Balavarsu	759	1.12	New
Margin of victory		11,559	17.06	−4.16
Turnout		67,767	64.32	−10.10
Registered electors		108,614		
DMK hold		Swing	-1.88	

=== 1967 ===
1967 Madras Legislative Assembly election: Thousand Lights
Party	Candidate	Votes	%	±%
DMK	K. A. Mathiazhagan	39,518	59.27	+13.68
INC	M. Sivaraj	25,370	38.05	−3.67
Margin of victory		14,148	21.22	17.35
Turnout		66,670	74.42	3.77
Registered electors		91,441		
DMK hold		Swing	13.68	

=== 1962 ===
1962 Madras Legislative Assembly election: Thousand Lights
Party	Candidate	Votes	%	±%
DMK	K. A. Mathiazhagan	27,984	45.59	New
INC	Indrani Changalvarayan	25,609	41.72	−4.19
TNP	Sambandam	4,772	7.78	New
SWA	C. M. Baslusamy	3,011	4.91	New
Margin of victory		2,375	3.87	−4.30
Turnout		61,376	70.65	33.01
Registered electors		89,518		
DMK gain from Independent		Swing	-8.49	

=== 1957 ===
1957 Madras Legislative Assembly election: Thousand Lights
Party	Candidate	Votes	%	±%
Independent	A. V. P. Asaithambi	17,632	54.08	New
INC	K. Venkatasamy Naidu	14,970	45.92	+21.28
Margin of victory		2,662	8.17	1.61
Turnout		32,602	37.64	−52.30
Registered electors		86,621		
Independent gain from INC		Swing	29.44	

=== 1952 ===
1952 Madras Legislative Assembly election: Thousand Lights
Party	Candidate	Votes	%	±%
INC	Venkataswami Naiudu	31,042	24.64	New
Independent	Sivashanmugham Pillai	22,787	18.09	New
Justice Party	Indirani Balasubaramaniam	19,236	15.27	New
Socialist Party (India)	Marthandam Pillai	8,127	6.45	New
Independent	Dorairaj	6,448	5.12	New
IUML	Syed Niamuthulla Sahib	5,706	4.53	New
Independent	Jasubatham	5,409	4.29	New
Independent	Manickavasagam	5,125	4.07	New
Independent	Kabalamurthi	3,771	2.99	New
Independent	Raja	3,304	2.62	New
KMPP	Yakambaram	3,034	2.41	New
Margin of victory		8,255	6.55	
Turnout		125,975	89.94	
Registered electors		140,070		
INC win (new seat)				
