= A. Vetriazhagan =

Tamil Nadu politician

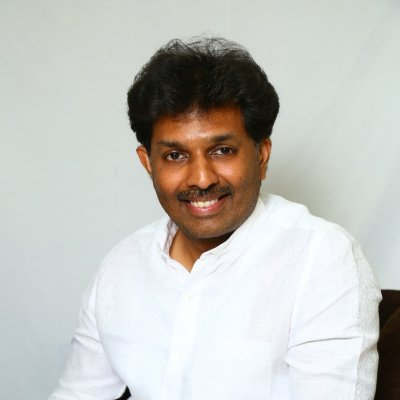

Member of the Tamil Nadu Legislative Assembly
- In office 2 May 2021 – 4 May 2026
- Preceded by: B. Ranganathan
- Constituency: Villivakkam

Personal details
- Born: 11 September 1978 (age 48)
- Party: Dravida Munnetra Kazhagam
- Spouse: V. Valarnila
- Relations: Perasiriyar K. Anbazhagan (Grandfather)
- Children: Dr. Chinappa Kuttyappa Aadhaavan Vetriazhagan muthushekar pintu
- Parent: A. Anbuchelvan (father) V. Kalyani (mother)
- Education: Dav Mogapair, Don bosco, B.E (Electronics and Communication Engineering) From Anna University, MBA from Annamalai University, Chennai
- Occupation: Social entrepreneur, businessman, educationalist, politician
- Website: www.dawnschool.in

Anbuchelvan Vetriazhagan is a member of the Tamil Nadu Legislative Assembly representing the Villivakkam constituency in the 16th Tamil Nadu Assembly. He is the grandson of Perasiriyar K. Anbazhagan who was the finance minister of Tamil Nadu in M. Karunanthi's ministry.

== Early life ==
Born on 11 September 1978, A. Vertiazhagan completed his schooling at Don Bosco, Egmore and higher secondary at DAV Mogappair. He completed his B.E. Electronics & Communication from Anna University, Chennai followed by an MBA from Annamalai University.

== Social Contributions ==
Mr. Vetriazhagan contested the prestigious Senate Constituency of Madras University to be elected for Pachaiyappas Trust Board and got elected in the year 2009 as Trustee from the Madras University and as Financial Trustee in the Board Member Election. Consecutively, he won the Board Elections and got elected as Financial Trustee for a total period of three terms and served the position of FT (Financial Trustee) from 2009 – 2012. He resigned in the year 2012 from Pachaiyappas Trust Board.

== Electoral performance ==
2021 Tamil Nadu Legislative Assembly election: Villivakkam
Party	Candidate	Votes	%	±%
DMK	A. Vetriazhagan	76,127	53.37	+9.41
AIADMK	J. C. D. Prabhakar	38,890	27.26	−10.48
MNM	Sriharan	13,364	9.37	New
NTK	R. Sridar	10,914	7.65	+5.65
NOTA	NOTA	1,444	1.01	−1.26
DMDK	D. Subamangalam	1,094	0.77	−4.72
Margin of victory		37,237	26.10	19.89
Turnout		142,648	55.88	−4.00
Rejected ballots		881	0.62	
Registered electors		255,278		
DMK hold		Swing	9.41	

== Offices Held/Holding ==
- MLA from Villivakkam constituency (from May 2021 to present) on the 16th Assembly of TN
- Financial trustee of Pachaiyappa's trust board from 2009 – 2012
- Senate Member of Madras University – presently serving
- Founder AV Group
- Managing trustee of AV Educational trust
