= Khushbu Sundar =

Indian politician, actress and film producer (born 1970)

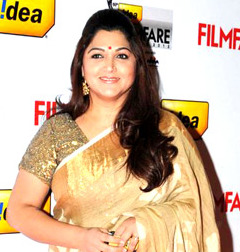
- Khushbu in 2013

Vice President of BJP Tamil Nadu
- Incumbent
- Assumed office 30 July 2025
- President: Nainar Nagenthran

Member of the National Commission for Women
- Incumbent
- Assumed office 28 February 2023

National Executive Committee Member of the Bharatiya Janata Party
- In office 7 October 2021 – 30 June 2025
- President: J. P. Nadda

Personal details
- Born: Nakhat Khan; 29 September 1970 (age 56) Bombay, Maharashtra, India
- Party: Bharatiya Janata Party (2020–present)
- Other political affiliations: Indian National Congress (2014–2020), Dravida Munnetra Kazhagam (2010–2014)
- Spouse: Sundar C (m. 2000)
- Children: 2
- Profession: Politician; actress; film producer; television personality
- Nickname: Kushboo

Khushbu Sundar (born Nakhat Khan on 29 September 1970) is an Indian politician, actress, film producer and television personality. She is known for her work predominantly in Tamil language films.

== Early life ==
Khushbu was born as Nakhat Khan on 29 September 1970 into a Muslim family in Bombay, Maharashtra, India. Her parents gave her the stage name Khushbu when she started her career as a child actress. She has lived in Chennai for nearly 40 years.

== Film career ==
Khushbu started her career as a child artist in the Hindi film The Burning Train (1980) in the song "Teri Hai Zameen Tera Aasman". Between 1980 and 1985, she performed as a child actor in various Hindi films like Naseeb, Laawaris, Kaalia, Dard Ka Rishta, and Bemisal. Her sensitive performance in the emotional 1982 Hindi movie, Dard Ka Rishta was appreciated by audiences.

She made her adult acting debut in the much-acclaimed 1985 Hindi film Meri Jung in a supporting role as Anil Kapoor's younger sister. In the same year, she got her first lead role in the film Jaanoo opposite veteran actor Jackie Shroff. This was followed by Tan-Badan (1986) paired with Govinda. Khushbu played a significant supporting role in Deewana Mujh Sa Nahin (1990), alongside Aamir Khan and Madhuri Dixit.

Khushbu was introduced to South Indian screens by D. Ramanaidu and K. Raghavendra Rao through the Telugu film Kaliyuga Pandavulu (1986). Khushbu moved her base to Chennai and started focussing on Tamil and other South Indian film industries.

Khushbu had done close to 12 movies in Telugu and Kannada, and had bagged her first role in Tamil in the movie Dharmathin Thalaivan (1988). Then she did films like Varusham 16 (1989), Kizhakku Vaasal (1990) and Nadigan (1990), but the movie which catapulted her to the top was the runaway hit Chinna Thambi (1991).

She met her future husband on the set of Sundar C's directorial debut Murai Maman (1995).

She later appeared in successful films such as Nattupura Pattu (1996), Irattai Roja (1996), Ettupatti Rasa (1997), Paththini (1997), Thulli Thirintha Kaalam (1998), Simmarasi (1998), Viralukketha Veekkam (1999), Power of Women (2005), Periyar (2007) and Pazhani (2008).

Khushbu then forayed into television, plunged into politics and also devoted time as a homemaker.

In 2021, she made a comeback with Rajinikanth in Annaatthe.

She also makes appearances in songs directed by her husband Sundar C such as Theeya Velai Seiyyanum Kumaru (2013), Aambala (2015), Aranmanai 2 (2016) and Aranmanai 4 (2024).

== Filmography ==
=== Overseas engagements ===
Involvement with the Australian Football League (AFL) Khushbu and sprinter Usain Bolt are honorary members of Richmond Football Club, based in Melbourne, Australia. Khushbu was made the number-one ticket holder of the club in March 2017, becoming the first Indian and the only Indian woman to receive that honour in the AFL. Khushbu was introduced to Australian Rules Football in connection with her association with the Richmond Football Club.

=== Session at the RMIT University, Melbourne ===
On 14 August 2017, Khushbu was invited by RMIT University to speak with their Media and Communication students about the 'Representation of Women in Indian Cinema' at a session moderated by Dr. Vikrant Kishore. She also engaged in a lengthy Q&A with students and guests, sharing her own experiences of working in Indian cinema for over 37 years and appearing in around 200 films.

Around 200-plus students and guests turned up to listen and interact with Khushbu.

=== Indian Independence Day at the Deakin University, Melbourne ===
On 15 August 2017, Khushbu was invited as the chief guest at the Deakin University Indian Club's (DUIC) Indian Independence Day celebrations event by DUIC Founder President Mr. Amogh Chakravarthy. Deakin University's Deputy Vice-Chancellor for Global Engagement, Professor Gary Smith, was guest of honor at the celebrations, which were hosted at the university's Burwood Campus.

== Political career ==
=== DMK ===
Khushbu joined the DMK on 14 May 2010. She was welcomed by DMK Leader Karunanidhi at the party headquarters in Chennai. Khushbu quit DMK on 16 June 2014.

=== Congress ===
Khushbu joined the Indian National Congress on 26 November 2014 after meeting with then Congress President Mrs. Sonia Gandhi and then Vice-president Mr. Rahul Gandhi. She served as the National Spokesperson of the INC. Khushbu had been very critical of Narendra Modi's policies and had often taken to Twitter to criticise the ruling dispensation.

Khushbu resigned from Congress on 12 October 2020 ahead of the Tamil Nadu Assembly elections in 2021. The Congress Secretary of Media said that Khushbu was being pressured by her husband, Sundar C, to join the BJP. Khushbu claimed that her previous party "does not want an intelligent woman" and there is no freedom to speak the truth within the party. She referred to the Congress as "mentally retarded". The National Platform for the Rights of the Disabled (NPRD) filed 30 complaints at different police stations in the state over her statements, alleging that she made derogatory remarks against people with disabilities.

=== BJP ===
On 12 October 2020, Khushbu joined the Bharatiya Janata Party. She is currently a National Executive Committee Member of the Bharatiya Janata Party.

Khushbu said during a meeting with journalists in November 2023 that she wouldn't apologize for using the term "cheri language". She used the term to highlight the use of foul language against women in a post on social media platform X while responding to a supporter of the DMK who accused her of staying silent during the Manipur ethnic violence on social media. In Tamil, the term refers to Dalit colonies that are separated from the rest of a village or town, and it is frequently used in a derogatory manner in reference to anything crude or crass. Her use of the term 'cheri' was condemned by activists for its caste-based connotations. The Neelam Foundation, an organization fighting for Dalit rights, demanded an unconditional apology. The Viduthalai Chiruthaigal Katchi lodged a police complaint about her remarks. The Chennai city police increased security for Khushbu's house after the SC/ST wing of the Congress party announced a protest in front of her house. In her defence, she claimed that she had utilized the French term 'chéri', which translates to 'beloved', and not the Tamil word 'cheri'.

=== 2021 Tamil Nadu assembly election ===
The Bharatiya Janata Party fielded Khushbu for the 2021 Tamil Nadu Legislative Assembly election from Thousand Lights constituency in Chennai. She lost the election by a margin of 32,200 votes to Ezhilan Naganathan of Dravida Munnetra Kazhagam.

Elections	Constituency	Party	Result	Vote %	Opposition candidate	Opposition party	Opposition vote %
2021	Thousand Lights	BJP	Lost	28.99	Ezhilan Naganathan	DMK	52.87

Khushbu Sundar was appointed as Tamil Nadu BJP vice president on 30 July 2025.

== Popularity ==
=== Temple built for Khushbu ===
During her prime, Khushbu was a prominent actress in Tamil cinema. She became the first Indian actress for whom her fans built a dedicated temple.

=== Food dishes, products named after Khushbu ===
During her prominence in Tamil cinema, several dishes in Tamil Nadu were named after Khushbu. Kushboo Idli, a rice cake, stood out as the most popular food item named after the actress. Other items such as Kushboo Jhumki, Kushboo Sarees, Kushboo Sharbet, Kushboo Coffee, Kushboo Cocktails, and various other food items were also named after her, with many still retaining those names.

== Social issues ==
=== Support for Jallikattu ===
Khushbu has been a very vocal supporter of the bull-taming sport, jallikattu, and has voiced her opinion at various national and international platforms. In Aug 2017, she even visited a cattle station in Warrnambool, Australia, to get a better understanding of how cattle are treated and raised on farms outside India.

=== Advocacy for recognition of South Indian cinema ===
Khushbu has spoken about the need for greater global recognition of South Indian and non-Hindi Indian cinema at international film festivals and platforms. In August 2017, Khushbu visited the Victorian Parliament and met with former Victorian Premier Ted Baillieu regarding broader recognition for South Indian cinema in the Indian Film Festival of Melbourne.

== Awards and nominations ==
Year	Award	Category	Film	Result	Ref.
1991	Cinema Express Awards	Best Actress – Tamil	Chinna Thambi	Won	
1996	Cinema Express Awards	Best Actress – Tamil	Irattai Roja	Won	
1991	Tamil Nadu State Film Award	Tamil Nadu State Film Award for Best Actress	Chinna Thambi	Won	
1995	Tamil Nadu State Film Award	Tamil Nadu State Film Award for Best Actress	Kolangal	Won	
1997	Tamil Nadu State Film Award	Tamil Nadu State Film Award Special Prize	Paththini	Won	

== Personal life ==
She dated actor Prabhu while filming Chinna Thambi (1991). Khushbu started seeing Prahbu in 1989, and by 1991 she had fallen in love with him. In 1996, Khushbu gave an interview to an English film magazine where she revealed that she and Prabhu had been in a live-in relationship for four and a half years before getting married. Their wedding took place on 12 September 1993, at the house they had bought in Poes Garden.

In 2000, Khushbu married actor, director, and producer Sundar C. Following their union, she adopted her husband's name, Sundar, and has since been known as Khushbu Sundar. They have two daughters, Avantika and Anandita, after whom they named their production house, Avni Cinemax.

Although she married a Hindu, she has stated that she has not converted to Hinduism, nor has she been asked to do so by her husband. Khushbu stated in 2006 that she was an atheist.

== Controversies ==
=== Opposition by Hindutva groups ===
Kushbu stirred controversy in December 2012 when she wore a saree that had images of the Hindu gods Rama, Krishna and Hanuman. The Hindu Makkal Katchi demanded an apology from her and threatened to start agitations. She responded by saying, "I am not going to answer every Tom, Dick and Harry. Why should I? There is no need at all. Why are they worried about what a woman sports. Don't they have any other worthwhile work?".

The Hindu Munnani and the Hindu Makkal Katchi filed several cases against Khushbu, accusing the actress of disrespecting Hindu gods by sitting cross-legged with her slippers in front of the idols of the goddesses Lakshmi, Saraswati, and Parvati during a puja for the muhurta in Chennai on 22 November 2007.

=== Maxim morphed photo case ===
In January 2006, in its first Indian edition, Maxim magazine featured a full-page composite photograph with her head pasted onto the body of a model wearing a bikini. Khushbu filed two complaints: defamation and the indecent representation of women against the editor and four others involved with the magazine. The proceedings were later stayed by the Madras High Court in December 2007 based on a plea filed by one of those charged.

=== Comments on pre-marital sex ===
In 2005, she said in an interview it was fine for girls to indulge in pre-marital sex if they safeguard themselves and took precautions to prevent pregnancy and sexually transmitted diseases. Later, she justified her statement by saying no educated man could expect his partner to be a virgin. The Dalit Panthers of India stormed the office of the South India Film Artistes' Association in Chennai demanding an apology from her. The Pattali Makkal Katchi said it will protest outside her house. 22 complaints alleging that she was "defaming Tamil womanhood and chastity" were brought against her, but in 2010, the Supreme Court dismissed all cases.
