= K. A. Krishnaswamy =

Indian politician

- Born: Kaniyur A. Krishnaswamy; 24 March 1932; Kaniyur, Coimbatore, Tamil Nadu
- Died: May 18, 2010 (aged 78)
- Occupation: Politician

K. A. Krishnaswamy (24 March 1932 – 18 May 2010) was an Indian politician and minister in the Government of Tamil Nadu. He was the younger brother of K.A. Murugesan, a DK leader and K. A. Mathiazhagan, a founding leader of the Dravida Munnetra Kazhagam (DMK). He was the third person from the Kaniyur family to enter politics. Initially he belonged to the DMK and was a member of the Rajya Sabha(1972 -1978).

In 1972 when M. G. Ramachandran (M.G.R.) joined the All India Anna Dravida Munnetra Kazhagam (AIADMK), he joined the party as the second member. Krishnaswamy was the first organising secretary of the AIADMK and was the owner and editor of the Thennagam daily newspaper, which subsequently became the official organ of the AIADMK. He gave the title of Puratchi Thalaivar (Revolutionary Leader) to M.G.R.

He was one of the persons witness to alleged assault on MP Nanjil K. Manoharan on 15th November 1972 at Madras Airport.

He was briefly a member of the Tamil Nadu Legislative Council before being elected to the Tamil Nadu Legislative Assembly from Thousand Lights constituency in 1980. He was re-elected in the 1984, and 1991 elections.

During 1978–87, he held portfolios such as cooperation, small industries, dairy development and local administration in Ramachandran's cabinet. During 1991–96 he was the minister for law in J. Jayalalithaa's cabinet. He retired from active politics in 1996.

Krishnaswamy died on 18 May 2010.
