= ICT Academy =

Indian educational initiative

- தமிழ்நாடு தகவல் மற்றும் தகவல்தொடர்பு தொழில்நுட்பவியல் நிறுவனம்
- Formation: 27 August 2009
- Type: Non-profit organization
- Headquarters: Chennai, Tamil Nadu, India
- Members: Yes (Government institutions – No membership fee)
- Owner: Government of Tamil Nadu
- Chairman: Dr Atul Anand IAS
- Chief Executive Officer: Srikanth V
- Publication: ICTACT Journals
- Staff: 150–200
- Website: www.ictacademy.in

ICT Academy is an initiative of the Government of India in collaboration with the state governments and industries. ICT Academy is a not-for-profit society, and a joint venture under the public-private partnership (PPP) model.

ICT Academy was started to meet the skill requirements of the industry and generate more employment especially in tier 2 and 3 towns, the rural parts of the country. The organization was formed with representations from the State Government of Tamil Nadu, leading companies in the ICT industry and National Association of Software Services Companies (NASSCOM) in India.

ICT Academy is recently endorsed and recommended by NITI Aayog (National Institution for Transforming India Aayog), the National Planning body of Government of India as one of the unique organization for dissemination and replication, which is aligned to the Skill India Vision of the Government of India.

With training of teachers and students as the primary objective, ICT Academy has been working through a seven pillar program in the areas of faculty development, student skill development, entrepreneurship development, youth empowerment, industry-institute interaction, digital empowerment and research & publications.

== Initiatives ==
=== For students ===
- Link – Common Placement Drive
- Internship & AICTE Job Portal
- Youth Contests
- Skill Development Program

=== For institutions ===
- Membership
- Faculty development programs
- Faculty workshops
- Academic conferences

=== ICTACT Research Journals ===
- ICTACT Journal on Communication Technology
- ICTACT Journal on Image & Video Processing
- ICTACT Journal on Soft Computing
- ICTACT Journal on Microelectronics
- ICTACT Journal on Management Studies
- ICTACT Journal on Data Science and Machine Learning

IJCT, IJIVP, IJSC and IJME are approved and listed in UGC CARE List 1.

== Awards ==
- In 2022, ICT Academy received International recognitions from Great Place To Work® such as the 2022 Best Workplaces in India.
- In 2017, ICT Academy was recognized as the No.1 Contributor in India by Autodesk.
- In 2018, ICT Academy received the National Excellence Award from ASSOCHAM.
- In 2019, ICT Academy received the Best Skill Trainer Award from TNSDC.
- In 2020, ICT Academy received the Community Spotlight Award from CISCO.
- In 2020, Automation Anywhere honored ICT Academy of Tamil Nadu for its outstanding contributions in helping students to build Robotic Process Automation Skills during New India Learnathon 2020.
