= K. Anbazhagan =

Indian politician (1922–2020)

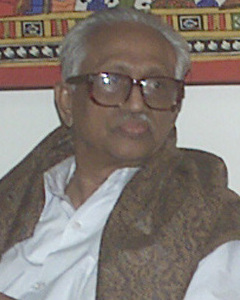
- Anbazhagan in 2006

Leader of the Opposition in Tamil Nadu Legislative Assembly
- In office 24 May 2001 – 14 April 2006
- Deputy: Arcot N. Veeraswami
- Chief Minister: J. Jayalalithaa; O. Panneerselvam
- Preceded by: S. Balakrishnan
- Succeeded by: O. Panneerselvam

Minister of finance in the Government of Tamil Nadu
- In office 17 May 2006 – 15 May 2011
- Chief Minister: M. Karunanidhi
- Preceded by: C. Ponnaiyan
- Succeeded by: O. Panneerselvam

Minister of education in the Government of Tamil Nadu
- In office 16 May 1996 – 15 May 2001
- Chief Minister: M. Karunanidhi
- In office 27 January 1989 – 30 January 1991
- Chief Minister: M. Karunanidhi

Minister for health in the Government of Tamil Nadu
- In office 15 March 1971 – 31 January 1976
- Chief Minister: M. Karunanidhi

Leader of the house in the Tamil Nadu Legislative Assembly
- In office 17 May 2006 – 14 June 2011
- Chief Minister: M. Karunanidhi
- Preceded by: C. Ponnaiyan
- Succeeded by: O. Panneerselvam
- In office 27 January 1989 – 30 January 1991

Member of Tamil Nadu Legislative Assembly
- In office 14 May 2001 – 12 May 2006
- Constituency: Harbour
- In office 16 November 1984 – 26 January 1989
- Constituency: Park Town
- In office 30 June 1977 – 15 November 1984
- Constituency: Purasawalkam

Member of Parliament, Lok Sabha
- In office 4 March 1967 – 15 March 1971
- Constituency: Tiruchengode

Member of Madras Legislative Council
- In office 1 April 1957 – 25 February 1967

General Secretary of Dravida Munnetra Kazhagam
- In office 17 May 1977 – 7 March 2020
- Preceded by: V. R. Nedunchezhiyan
- Succeeded by: Durai Murugan

Personal details
- Born: Ramaiah; 19 December 1922 Kattoor, Madras Presidency, British India (now in Tamil Nadu, India)
- Died: 7 March 2020 (aged 97) Chennai, Tamil Nadu, India
- Party: Dravida Munnetra Kazhagam
- Other political affiliations: Justice Party
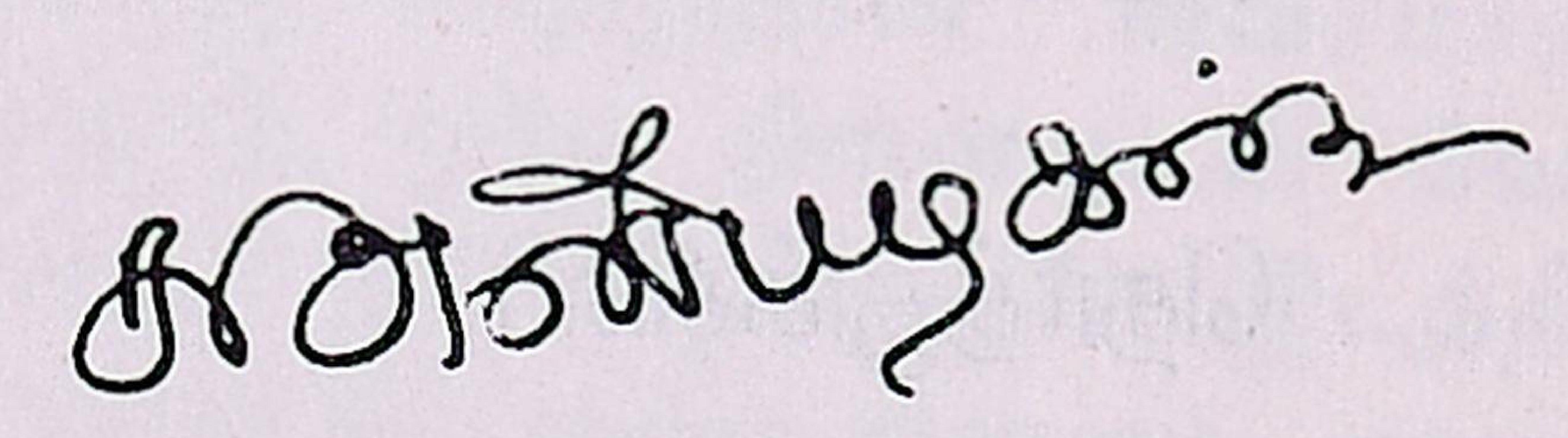
- Signature

Kalyanasundaram Anbazhagan (19 December 1922 – 7 March 2020) was an Indian politician. He was part of the Dravidian movement and later joined the Dravida Munnetra Kazhagam (DMK). He served as the general secretary of the DMK from 1977 to 2020. He has held several ministerial portfolios in the Tamil Nadu government when M. Karunanidhi was the Chief Minister of Tamil Nadu.

Anbazhagan was popularly referred to as Perasiriyar (professor) as he worked in Pachaiyappa's College before resigning to contest elections in 1957. He was elected to the Tamil Nadu Legislative Assembly for the first time in 1957, and was re-elected on eight further occasions. He was later elected to the Madras Legislative Council twice in 1957 and 1962. He was elected to the Lok Sabha, the lower house of Parliament of India from Tiruchengode in the 1967 Indian general election. He served as the leader of opposition in the Tamil Nadu assembly from 2001 to 2006.

== Early life ==
Anbazhagan was born in Kattoor near Thiruvarur in Tanjore district (now Thiruvarur District) of Madras Presidency on 19 December 1922 to M. Kalyanasundaranar and Swarnambal as Ramaiah. His father ran a khadi store at Mayiladuthurai. He changed his name to Anbazhagan after being influenced by the Tanittamil Iyakkam. He was drawn into politics, having influenced by the speeches of Periyar. In 1942, he addressed a Justice Party meeting in Thiruvarur as a student after being requested by C. N. Annadurai and met with M. Karunanidhi for the first time. He completed his college at Annamalai University and joined Pachaiyappa's College as a lecturer in Tamil in 1944.

== Political career ==
=== Early career ===
Anbazhagan resigned his position from the Pachaiyappa's College to contest elections the elections to contest the 1957 Madras State Legislative Assembly election. He was elected as a Member of Legislative Assembly from Egmore. He was a member of the Madras Legislative Council from 1957 to 1967. In the 1967 Indian general election, he was elected as a member of the Lok Sabha from the Tiruchengode Lok Sabha constituency. In 1971, he served as Social Welfare minister of Tamil Nadu. He had given up his M.L.A. position, representing Park Town constituency, in 1984 putting forward the Tamil Eelam issue. He was elected from Harbour constituency in 1996, 2001 and 2006. He served as the opposition leader of Tamil Nadu assembly from 2001 to 2006.

=== General secretary of DMK ===
Beyond his prominent public roles, Anbazhagan was widely regarded as a principal strategist within the Dravida Munnetra Kazhagam. Scholars and party observers have noted that he frequently served as the chief architect behind the party’s election campaigns and policy formulations. Anbazhagan played a significant advisory role in several key areas, including candidate selection—ensuring caste and regional balance within the party’s electoral tickets—and in drafting speeches and framing messages, drawing upon his background in literature and rhetoric to shape the DMK’s communication style. He was also influential in policy planning, particularly in aligning welfare measures with Dravidian ideological precepts. Although his influence was less visible to the public compared to the party’s frontline leaders, party insiders have often described Anbazhagan as the “backroom strategist,” whose counsel guided the DMK’s electoral tactics and political alliances.

During his tenure as General Secretary of the Dravida Munnetra Kazhagam (DMK), K. Anbazhagan was involved in the disproportionate assets case concerning AIADMK leader J. Jayalalithaa. He filed a petition in the Supreme Court requesting the transfer of the case's trial from Tamil Nadu to Karnataka, citing concerns about ensuring a fair judicial process. Anbazhagan subsequently participated as a petitioner and observer in the legal proceedings, which received extensive media coverage and concluded with a landmark judgment.

=== Minister for education ===
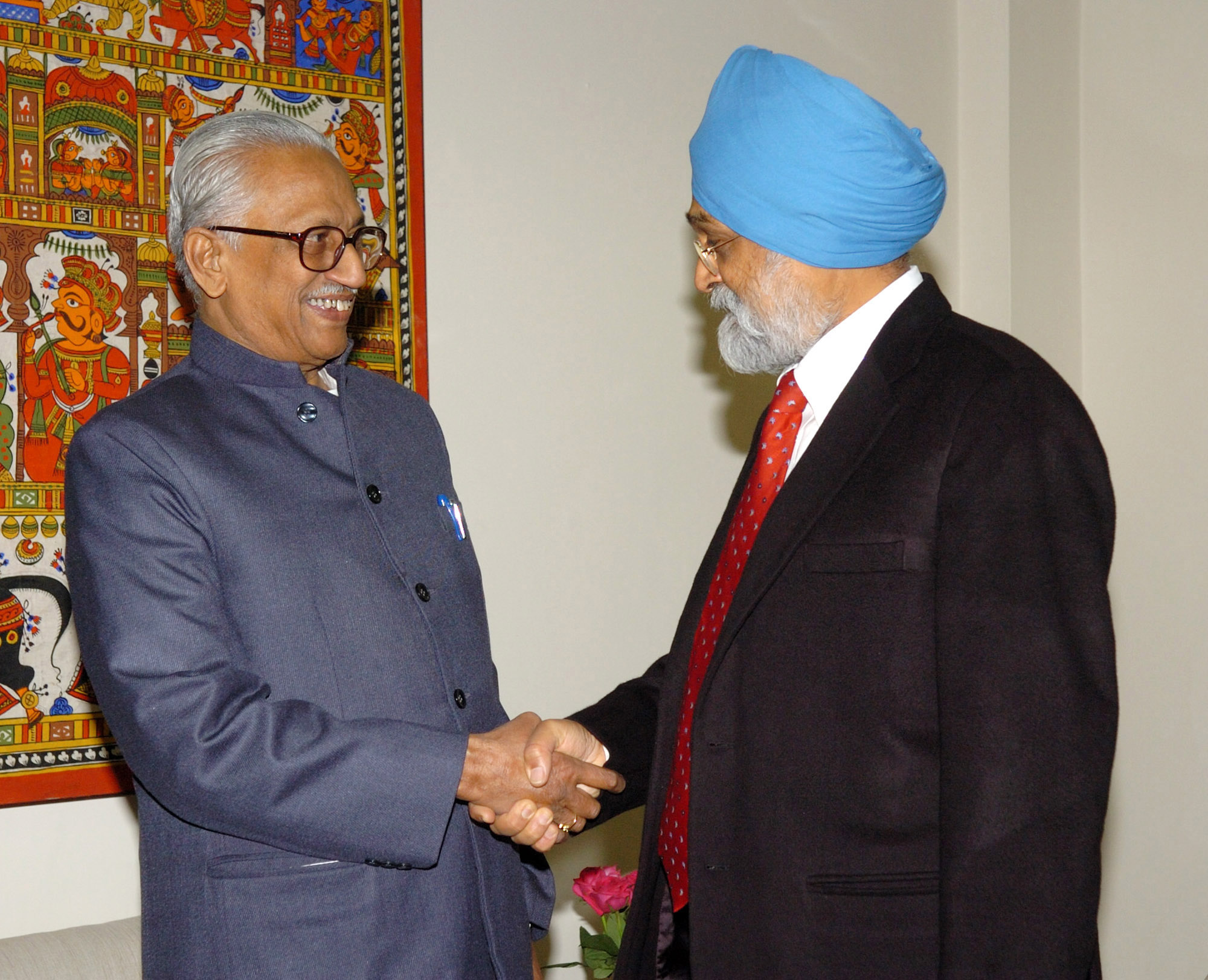
Anbazhagan (left) in 2008

During his tenure as Minister for Education in Tamil Nadu, Anbazhagan implemented reforms that had long-term effects on the state’s academic landscape.

- Curriculum reforms: He oversaw changes aimed at modernizing school curricula, integrating science and social justice themes with Tamil cultural and literary heritage.
- Promotion of Tamil as medium of instruction: A strong proponent of mother tongue education, he expanded opportunities for students to study in Tamil, while simultaneously safeguarding access to English and other languages.
- Higher education policies: He emphasized the need for expanding government colleges and making higher education accessible to marginalized communities, consistent with the Dravidian movement’s social justice agenda.

=== Minister for finance ===
During his tenure as Finance Minister from 2006 to 2011, Anbazhagan presented several annual budget proposals that included agricultural policy reforms. His administration implemented a cooperative loan waiver program valued at ₹7,000 crore, which reportedly provided debt relief to approximately 2.2 million farmers.

In the 2007–2008 state budget, the government reduced interest rates on crop loans from 7% to 5% for borrowers who repaid loans within the stipulated timeframe. The same budget allocation included ₹2,547 crore for the "Irrigated Agriculture Modernisation and Water Bodies Restoration and Management" project, aimed at agricultural infrastructure development.

=== Later years ===
In the 2011 Tamil Nadu Legislative Assembly election, Anbazhagan contested from Villivakkam constituency instead of his traditional Harbour constituency, where he had previously served as the representative. He was defeated by a margin of approximately 8,000 votes.

In the previous election in 2006, Anbazhagan had won the Harbour constituency by a margin of 400 votes.The 2011 defeat marked the end of his electoral career, which had spanned 54 years.

=== Elections contested ===
==== Madras Legislative Council ====
Year	Election	Party	PC Name	Result
1957	Tamil Nadu Legislative Council	DMK	Tamil Nadu	Won
1962	Tamil Nadu Legislative Council	DMK	Tamil Nadu	Won

==== Lok Sabha ====
Elections	Constituency	Party	Result	Vote percentage	Opposition Candidate	Opposition Party	Opposition vote percentage
1967	Tiruchengode	DMK	Won	55.29	T. M. Kaliannan	INC	43.81

==== Tamil Nadu Legislative Assembly ====
Elections	Constituency	Party	Result	Vote percentage	Opposition Candidate	Opposition Party	Opposition vote percentage
1957	Egmore	Independent	Won	51.81	Radhakrishnan	INC	42.2
1962	Egmore	DMK	Lost	45.58	Jothi Venkatachalam	INC	48.25
1971	Purasawalkam	DMK	Won	56.13	Bashyam Reddy	INC	41.65
1977	Purasawalkam	DMK	Won	45.09	T. S. Govindaswamy	JP	24.16
1980	Purasawalkam	DMK	Won	52.35	Valampuri John	AIADMK	46.68
1984	Park Town	DMK	Won	50.89	M. Jothi	Independent	46.92
1989	Anna Nagar	DMK	Won	49.94	V. Sukumar Babu	AIADMK(J)	27.28
1991	Chepauk	DMK	Lost	43.00	Zeenath Sheriffdeen	INC	50.62
1996	Harbour	DMK	Won	70.57	Earnest Paul	INC	16.19
2001	Harbour	DMK	Won	46.98	D. Pandian	CPI	46.33
2006	Harbour	DMK	Won	44.24	H. Seema Basheer	MDMK	43.55
2011	Villivakkam	DMK	Lost	44.20	J. C. D. Prabhakar	AIADMK	52.44

== Personal life and death ==
Anbazhagan lived with his wife Santhakumari in Aspiran Garden, Kilpauk Chennai.

In his later years, Anbazhagan was in poor health, which minimized his political activities and public appearances, with the last one being on his 97th birthday on 19 December 2019.

On 24 February 2020, his health deteriorated and became "extremely critical and unstable", and he was admitted at Apollo Hospital in Chennai for treatment. He died there at 1:05 IST on 7 March 2020 due to complications of diabetes mellitus. The DMK declared a seven-day mourning after his death.

His grandson A. Vetriazhagan served as MLA from Villivakkam constituency.

== Posthumous recognition ==
In 2022, during Anbazhagan's birth centenary commemorations, the Tamil Nadu government established the "Perasiriyar K. Anbazhagan Award for Best Schools". The award program recognizes 76 schools annually—two from each district—based on criteria including academic performance, teaching methods, infrastructure, and student welfare provisions. Chief Minister M. K. Stalin announced the award during the centenary observances.

The state government also announced the "Perasiriyar Anbazhagan School Development Scheme", allocated ₹7,000 crore over a five-year period for government school modernization and the construction of 18,000 new classrooms. The Integrated Finance Complex at Nandanam, Chennai, was renamed the "Professor K. Anbazhagan Complex".The complex includes a statue commemorating Anbazhagan.

== Literary works ==
Anbazhagan has sound knowledge of Tamil poetry. He contributed to Tamil literature through a variety of works. His published writings include books on the Dravidian movement, its leaders, contemporary social and political issues, as well as fictional novels. Some of his published works include:

- Urimai vaazhvu
- Viduthalaik kavignar
- Pesum kalai valarpom
- Thamizh kadal
- Alai osai
- Thamizhar thirumanamum inamaanamum
- Azhagurani
- Dravida Iyakkam
- Dravida Iyakkathin Thotramaum Thevaiyum
- Inamozhi Vaazhvurimai Por
- Ivarthaam Periyar
- Maamanithar Anna
- Neengalum Pechalar Aagalam
- Perasiriyargal
- Singa Ilainjyaney Silirthu Ezhuthu
- Thamizh Kadalin Alai Osai
- Thamizh Vaanin Vidivelli Thandhai Periyar
- Thamizhinakkaavalar Kalaignar
- The Dravidian Movement (in English)
- Thonda? Dhuveshama?
- Valarum Kilarchi
- Vakkupurimai Porattam
- Vazhga Dravidam (வாழ்க திராவிடம்)
- Vivekanandar - Vizhantha Manithakula Thondu

In recognition of his literary contributions, the Tamil Nadu government announced in December 2021 that all of Anbazhagan's works would be nationalized, with Chief Minister M.K. Stalin presenting compensation to his family during his birth centenary celebrations.
