= A. Selvarajan =

Indian politician

A. Selvarajan is an Indian politician and former Member of the Legislative Assembly of Tamil Nadu. He was elected to the Tamil Nadu legislative assembly from Harbour constituency as a Dravida Munnetra Kazhagam candidate in 1977, and 1980 elections.
