= B. Ranganathan =

Indian politician

B. Ranganathan is an Indian politician and has been a Member of the Legislative Assembly of Tamil Nadu. He was elected to the Tamil Nadu legislative assembly from Purasawalkam constituency as an Indian National Congress candidate in the 1991 and 1996 elections. He was elected as a Dravida Munnetra Kazhagam candidate in 2001 election. In 2006 election he was elected as M.L.A. for Villivakkam constituency. He was re-elected to Villivakkam constituency in 2016. He was a staunch opponent of AIADMK and their policies. He is very active in Kolathur ex-Purasai area and lives in Jawahar Nagar near Perambur. B. Ranganathan has a reputation for field work and his fights with the opponents in and outside the assembly. He was once a confidant of P. Chidambaram when in Congress but moved to DMK after Mr Chidambaram merged his Peravai with Congress.

== Elections Contested ==
=== Tamilnadu State Legislative Assembly Elections Contested ===
Elections	Constituency	Party	Result	Vote percentage	Opposition Candidate	Opposition Party	Opposition vote percentage
1989	Purasawalkam	AIADMK(J)	Lost	22.07	Arcot N. Veeraswami	DMK	49.88
1991	Purasawalkam	INC	Won	39.68	Arcot N. Veeraswami	DMK	26.99
1996	Purasawalkam	TMC(M)	Won	70.61	Gnanam. J. Kathipara	INC	18.37
2001	Purasawalkam	DMK	Won	48.53	Vetriivel P	TMC(M)	45.89
2006	Villivakkam	DMK	Won	45.63	G. Kalan	AIADMK	40.70
2016	Villivakkam	DMK	Won	43.96	Thadi M. Raju	AIADMK	37.75
