= P. Kolandaivelu =

Indian politician

P. Kolandaivelu is an Indian politician and former Member of the Legislative Assembly of Tamil Nadu. He was elected to the Tamil Nadu legislative assembly as an Anna Dravida Munnetra Kazhagam candidate from Udumalpet constituency in the 1977 and 1980 elections. He served as minister from 1977 to 1980, Agriculture department, 1980, as local administration, and rural development, departments and highways, and nutrition meals, minister in MGR cabinet, from 1984 to 1989 Gobichetty Palayam member of parliament, and opposition leader in Lok Shaba (AIADMK party) in 1987 to 1989 PAC chairman, second Tamilian as PAC chairman. 1993-1996 special representative of Tamil Nadu. In cm J, Jayalalitha tenure.
