= U. Krishna Rao =

Indian medical practitioner and politician

Udupi Krishna Rau (1900 – 3 August 1961) was a medical practitioner and politician of the Indian National Congress. He served as mayor of Madras city and as State minister.

== Early life ==
Born in 1900 in Madras, Krishna Rau was the son of U. Rama Rau. He studied medicine and started practising in 1924.

== Political career ==
Krishna Rau joined the Indian National Congress and was elected to the Madras Corporation in 1930. He served as member of the corporation from 1930 to 1948 serving as chairman of the Health, Taxation and Finance Committee. In 1947, he was nominated mayor of Madras and served from 1947 to 1948.

Krishna Rau served as Member of the Legislative Assembly of Madras state (representing the Harbour constituency during 1952-61). He was a medical doctor by profession and co-edited a medical journal called Antiseptic founded by his father U. Rama Rau and T. M. Nair. He served as the mayor of Madras during 1947–48. He served as the president of the state president of the Indian Medical Association between 1950 and 52. From 1952 to 54, he served as the minister in charge of Industries, Labour, Motor Transport, Railways, Posts, Telegraphs and Civil Aviation in the cabinet of C. Rajagopalachari. He also served as the Speaker of the Madras Legislative Assembly from 1957 to 1961. His father Rama Rau had earlier served as the chairman of the upper house of the Madras legislature - the Madras Legislative Council.

== Notes ==
Preceded by T. Sundara Rao Naidu	Mayor of Madras; 1947-1948	Succeeded by S. Ramaswamy Naidu
