= W. R. Varadarajan =

Indian politician and trade unionist

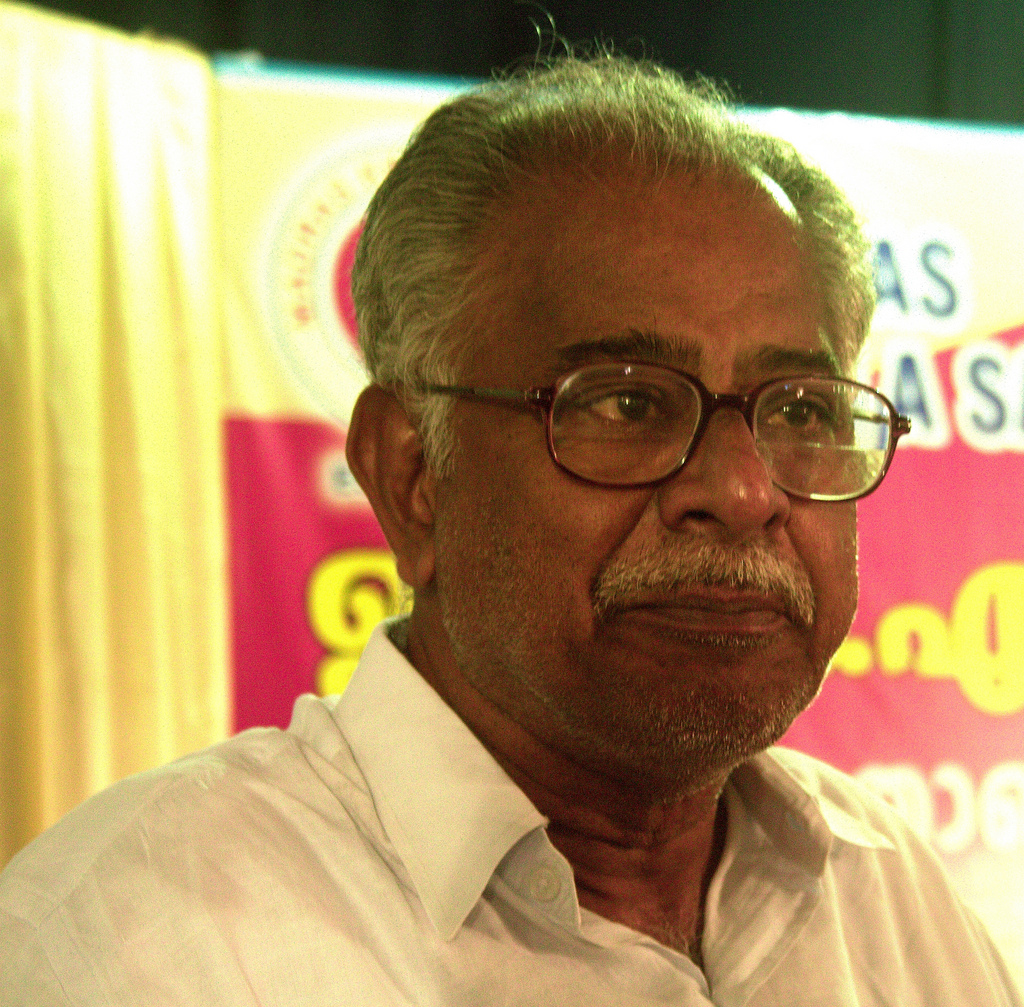
- W. R. Varadarajan
- Born: 9 July 1945; Ulliyanallur, Tamil Nadu, India
- Died: 11 February 2010 (aged 64); Chennai, Tamil Nadu, India

W.R. Varadarajan (Tamil: உ. ரா. வரதராஜன்) (9 July 1945 – 11 February 2010) was an Indian politician and trade unionist. He was a Central Committee member of the Communist Party of India (Marxist) and All India Secretary of the Centre of Indian Trade Unions (CITU).

Varadarajan began his political career with M. P. Sivagnanam's Tamil Arasu Kazhagam. He was a Chartered Accountant and an employee of the Reserve Bank of India (RBI). In 1963 he joined the CPI (M). He was elected to the Tamil Nadu Legislative Assembly from Villivakkam Constituency in 1989 election. He obtained 99571 votes (46.77% of the votes in the constituency). He lost the seat in the 1991 election to Congress candidate E. Kalan. Varadarajan finished second, obtaining 71963 votes (33.79%).

== Death ==
On 14 February 2010, Varadarajan was reported missing by his wife. It was reported he had left behind two unsigned notes. In one suicide note written on 6 February, he had mentioned to problems in his personal life as the reason for choosing suicide. He had earlier been relieved of his membership of the CPI (M) central committee for undisclosed reasons. After a brief search, Tamil Nadu police announced on 21 February that Varadarajan's body had been found in the Porur lake on 13 February and had been kept in the Government Royapettah Hospital mortuary. It was later confirmed as Varadarajan by his wife and Finger print tests. He is survived by his wife Saraswathi and two sons.
