= 5th Tamil Nadu Assembly =

Indian election

1971 Tamil Nadu legislative assembly election
- March 1971

All 234 seats in the Legislature of Tamil Nadu
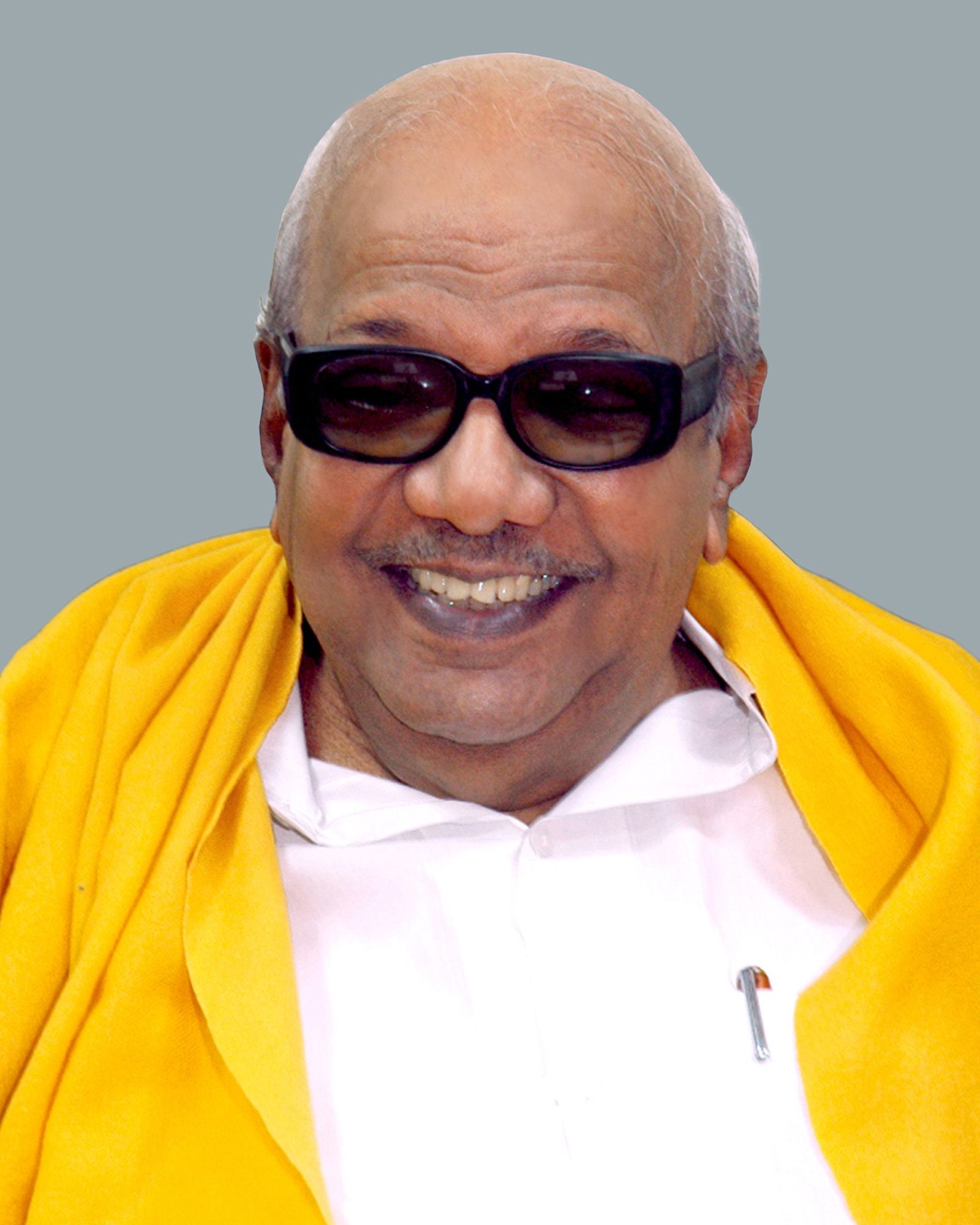

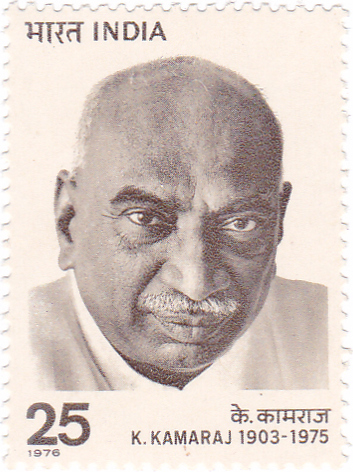
	First party	Second party
Leader	M. Karunanidhi	K. Kamaraj
Party	DMK	INC(O)
Leader's seat	Saidapet	did not contest
Seats won	205	21
Seat change	▲26	▼50
Popular vote	8,506,078	5,579,039
Percentage	54.30%	37.94%
Chief Minister before election
M. Karunanidhi
DMK
Chief Minister
M. Karunanidhi
DMK

The fifth legislative assembly election of Tamil Nadu was held in March 1971. Dravida Munnetra Kazhagam was re-elected, after its first victory under the leadership of C N Annadurai in 1967. This was the first time M. Karunanidhi, contested as the leader of DMK party won the election, since he assumed Chief Ministership for the first time, after the death of C N Annadurai. Karunanidhi had emerged successfully in the leadership crisis with other party leaders M. G. Ramachandran, and Nedunchezhiyan, which ensued after the death of C. N. Annadurai. The main opposition party in the election was Indian National Congress (Organisation) led by K. Kamaraj, whereas the Indian National Congress (Indira) faction aligned with Dravida Munnetra Kazhagam. This was the last election that had only 2 major parties in Tamilnadu. After the election, MGR was slowly cornered out of DMK, and finally he formed AIADMK, which has since then been the close equal of DMK.

== Background ==
The opposition party, Indian National Congress was heavily weakened due to a split that occurred in 1969. This led to the formation of Indian National Congress (Organisation) under K. Kamaraj, which was the major opposition in this election, while the Indian National Congress, supported the Dravida Munnetra Kazhagam. Indira Gandhi continued as Prime Minister with the support of Communist parties and DMK which had 25 seats in the Lok Sabha. It was during this time, the long-awaited Salem steel mill was approved. The ruling Congress party decided to dissolve the Lok Sabha and conduct early elections and Karunanidhi also decided to dissolve the state assembly and face the elections in alliance with Indira's Congress one year before the end of his term.

== Parties and alliances ==
Dravida Munnetra Kazhagam formed a seven party alliance called Left and Democratic Front (Progressive Front). The front was led by the DMK and comprised Indian National Congress (Indira), Communist Party of India (CPI), the Praja Socialist Party, the Forward Block, the Muslim League and M. P. Sivagnanam's Tamil National Party. The Congress party dependent on DMK votes in the Lok Sabha for survival had no influence in the seating arrangements. The Indira Congress contested in 9 out of 39 parliamentary constituencies but not in legislative assembly constituencies. Indira Gandhi instructed the leader of the Tamil Nadu Congress, Subramaniam to accept the arrangement in a sign indicative of writing off Tamil Nadu as a Congress territory.

The opposition front was a coalition of Kamaraj led Indian National Congress (Organisation) (Congress (O)), Rajaji's Swatantara Party, Samyukta Socialist Party, the Tamil Nadu Toilers' Party, the Republican Party and the Coimbatore District Agriculturist Association.

== Voting and results ==
=== Results ===
Source: Election Commission of India

Alliances	Party	Popular Vote	Vote %	Seats contested	Seats won	Change
Progressive Front; Seats: 205; Seat Change: +26; Popular Vote: 8,506,078; Popular Vote %: 54.30%	Dravida Munnetra Kazhagam	7,654,935	48.58%	203	184	▲47
Progressive Front; Seats: 205; Seat Change: +26; Popular Vote: 8,506,078; Popular Vote %: 54.30%	Communist Party of India	364,803	2.32%	10	8	▲6
Progressive Front; Seats: 205; Seat Change: +26; Popular Vote: 8,506,078; Popular Vote %: 54.30%	All India Forward Bloc	268,721	1.71%	9	7	▲6
Progressive Front; Seats: 205; Seat Change: +26; Popular Vote: 8,506,078; Popular Vote %: 54.30%	Praja Socialist Party	147,985	0.94%	4	4	—
Progressive Front; Seats: 205; Seat Change: +26; Popular Vote: 8,506,078; Popular Vote %: 54.30%	Indian Union Muslim League	69,634	0.44%	2	2	▼1
Democratic Front; Seats: 21; Seat Change: -50; Popular Vote: 6,016,530; Popular Vote %: 38.18%	Indian National Congress (Organisation)	5,513,894	34.99%	201	15	▼36
Democratic Front; Seats: 21; Seat Change: -50; Popular Vote: 6,016,530; Popular Vote %: 38.18%	Swatantra Party	465,145	2.95%	19	6	▼14
Democratic Front; Seats: 21; Seat Change: -50; Popular Vote: 6,016,530; Popular Vote %: 38.18%	Samyukta Socialist Party	37,491	0.24%	2	0	—
Others; Seats: 8 Seat Change: Popular Vote: 1,234,193; Popular Vote %: 7.52%	Independents	965,379	6.13%	256	8	
Others; Seats: 8 Seat Change: Popular Vote: 1,234,193; Popular Vote %: 7.52%	Communist Party of India (Marxist)	259,298	1.65%	37	0	▼11
Others; Seats: 8 Seat Change: Popular Vote: 1,234,193; Popular Vote %: 7.52%	Bharatiya Jana Sangh	9,516	0.06%	5	0	—
Total	11 Political Parties	15,756,801	100%	—	234	—

== Karunanidhi's Cabinet ==
The council of ministers in M. Karunanidhi's cabinet (in 1971).

Minister	Portfolios
M. Karunanidhi	Chief Minister
V. R. Nedunchezhiyan	Education and Revenue
K. Rajaram	Backward Classes
K. Anbazhagan	Public Health
Anbil P. Dharmalingam	Agriculture
S. J. Sadiq Pasha	Public Works
Satyavani Muthu	Harijan Welfare
M. Kannappan	Religious Endowments
S. Madhavan	Industries
N. V. Natarajan	Labour
O. P. Raman	Electricity
S. P. Adithanar	Cooperation
S. Ramachandran	Transport

== List of elected members ==
*	Elected as Chief Minister of Madras State

Assembly Constituency	Winner	Party	Runner-up	Party	Margin
Acharapakkam	V. Balasundaram	DMK	C. Ganesan	NCO	26,359
Aduthurai	K. Rajamanickam	DMK	A. Marimuthu	NCO	1,963
Alangudy	K. V. Subbiah	DMK	T. S. Thangavelu	NCO	7,882
Alangulam	V. Arunachalam	DMK	S. K. T. Ramachandran	NCO	1,838
Ambasamudram	S. Sanmugamuthu Thevar	NCO	R. V. Ananthakrishnan	DMK	3,484
Ambur	M. Panneerselvam	DMK	M. Adhimoolam	NCO	11,488
Andhiyur	E. M. Natarasan	DMK	K. S. Nanjappan	NCO	7,815
Andimadam	S. Sadasiva Padayachi	DMK	G. Thiyagarajan	NCO	4,523
Andipatti	N. V. Gurusamy Naidu	SWA	S. Paramasivam	FBL	4,132
Arakkonam	N. S. Balaraman	DMK	S. K. Subramanya Mudaly	NCO	15,378
Aranthangi	S. Ramanathan	DMK	Ramanathan Servaikarar	NCO	12,033
Aravakurichi	Addul Jabbar	MUL	S. Kadasamy Gounder	SWA	15,305
Arcot	N. Veerasami	DMK	N. R. Ethirajulu Naidu	NCO	14,065
Ariyalur	G. Sivaperumal	DMK	R. Sambasiva Moopanar	NCO	25,580
Arni	A. C. Narasimhan	DMK	M. Dharumarajan	NCO	13,083
Aruppukottai	Sowdi Sundara Bharathi	FBL	M. Veerasamy	SWA	9,113
Athoor	A. M. T. Nachiappan	DMK	T. P. S. Lakshmanan	NCO	16,728
Attur	V. Palanivel Gounder	DMK	C. Palanimuthu	NCO	4,211
Avanashi	T. O. Periasamy	IND	K. Thangavelu	DMK	719
Basin Bridge	M. R. Kannan	DMK	K. Ramadoss	NCO	15,785
Bhavani	A. M. Raja	DMK	P. Kuppusamy Mudaliar	NCO	13,047
Bhavanisagar	V. K. Ramarasan	DMK	M. Velusamy	NCO	7,011
Bhuvanagiri	M. A. Abusali	IND	R. Balakrishnan	NCO	5,324
Bodinayakkanur	M. Surulivel	DMK	A. Yellanna	IND	16,377
Chengalpattu	C. G. Viswanathan	DMK	S. T. Neelakantan	NCO	23,659
Chengam	C. Pandurangam	DMK	A. Arumugam	NCO	15,555
Cheranmadevi	D. S. A. Sivaprakasam	SWA	S. Ratnavelpandian	DMK	193
Cheyyar	K. Govindan	DMK	Perumalsamy Nayagar	NCO	8,301
Chidambaram	P. Ponchockalingam	DMK	R. Gopalakrishnan	NCO	1,679
Coimbatore East	K. Ranganathan	DMK	A. Devaraj	NCO	3,512
Coimbatore West	P. Gopal	DMK	S. S. Krishnaswamy	SWA	9,450
Colachel	A. Pauliah	NCO	S. Retnaraj	DMK	7,549
Coonoor	J. Karunainathan	DMK	N. Andy	NCO	18,126
Cuddalore	R. Govindaraj	DMK	P. R. Seenivasa Padayachi	NCO	4,310
Cumbum	K. P. Gopal	NCO	P. S. Chellathurai	DMK	677
Dharapuram	V. S. Palaniammal	DMK	V. N. Gopal	NCO	19,350
Dharmapuri	R. Chinnasamy	DMK	D. N. Adivel	NCO	12,027
Dindigul	O. N. Sundaram Pillai	NCO	Jama Hussain	IND	1,391
Edappadi	A. Arumugam	DMK	M. K. Ramakrishnan	SWA	4,946
Egmore	Arangannal	DMK	M. Kothandapani	NCO	4,863
Erode	M. Subramanian	DMK	K. P. Muthusamy	NCO	17,451
Gandarvakottai	Govindarasu Kalingarar	DMK	Durai Ramachandran	NCO	13,786
Gangaikondan	A. Karuppiah	DMK	S. Koil Pillai	NCO	14,756
Gingee	S. Sagadeva Gounder	DMK	V. Perumal Nainar	NCO	12,772
Gobichettipalayam	S. M. Palaniappan	DMK	K. M. Sundaramurthy	SWA	14,561
Gudalur	K. H. Bomman	SWA	K. Putta	CPI	1,941
Gudiyatham	E. K. Duraisami	DMK	D. A. Adimoolam	NCO	16,374
Gummidipundi	K. A. Vezhavendan	DMK	P. Obul Reddy	NCO	12,480
Harbour	A. M. Mohideen	IND	G. Umapathy	NCO	486
Harur	S. A. Chinnaraju	DMK	M. Ponnusamy	NCO	8,880
Hosur	B. Venkatasamy	SWA	T. Venkata Reddy	IND	13,196
Ilayangudi	V. Malaikannan	DMK	S. Ramakrishna Thevar	NCO	21,413
Jayankondam	A. Chinnasamy	DMK	S. Ramasamy	NCO	12,281
Kadaladi	C. Ramalingam	DMK	M. Alangaram	SWA	17,658
Kadambathur	A. Paranthaman	DMK	Era. Kulasekaran	NCO	19,666
Kadavur	Karuragiri Muthiah	NCO	P. Krishnasamy	DMK	1,989
Kadayanallur	A. R. Subbiah Mudaliar	DMK	S. M. Abdul Majid Sahib	NCO	3,570
Kalapsapakkam	S. Murugaiyan	DMK	M. Sundaraswamy	NCO	12,933
Kallakurichi	D. Kesavalu	DMK	S. Sivaraman	NCO	4,139
Kancheepuram	C. V. M. Annamalai	DMK	D. V. Natesa Mudaliar	NCO	6,312
Kandamangalam	M. Raman	DMK	P. P. Mathavan	NCO	11,665
Kangayam	Kovai Chezhiyan	DMK	K. G. Palanisamy Gounder	IND	22,042
Kaniyambadi	Thoppu Thiruvengadam	DMK	L. Balaraman	NCO	9,788
Kanyakumari	K. Rajah Pillai	DMK	B. Mahadevan Pillai	NCO	4,558
Kapilamalai	C. V. Velappan	DMK	P. Thyagarajan	NCO	9,977
Karaikudi	C. T. Chidambaram	DMK	S. P. R. Ramaswamy	SWA	13,128
Kariapatti	A. R. Perumal	FBL	M. Muthuvel Serval	NCO	9,324
Karur	Nallasamy	DMK	T. M. Nallaswamy	NCO	10,657
Katpadi	Durai Murugan	DMK	Dhandayuthapani	NCO	16,568
Kattumannarkoil	S. Perumal	DMK	T. M. Kuppusami	NCO	3,296
Kaveripattinam	V. C. Govindasamy	DMK	E. Pattabi Naidu	NCO	19,155
Killiyur	N. Dennis	NCO	C. Russel Raj	DMK	14,032
Kinathukadavu	M. Kannappan	DMK	S. T. Duraisamy	IND	25,727
Kodavasal	K. Periasamy Udayar	DMK	Kalingaraya Dakshinamoorthy	NCO	7,726
Kottur	A. K. Subbiah	CPI	T. Rajamanickam	NCO	30,110
Kovilpatti	S. Alagarsamy	CPI	L. Subba Naicker	NCO	15,198
Krishnagiri	C. Manniappan	DMK	T. G. Selvaraj	NCO	12,974
Krishnarayapuram	P. Soundarapandian	DMK	P. M. Thangavelraj	NCO	7,157
Kulittalai	M. Kandaswamy	DMK	P. E. Srinivasan Reddiar	NCO	6,052
Kumbakonam	N. Kasiraman	NCO	S. Padmanabhan	DMK	2,619
Kunnathur	M. Gopal	DMK	P. Appavoo	NCO	22,638
Kurinjipadi	N. Rajangam	DMK	M. Jayaraman	NCO	1,526
Kuttalam	S. Ganesan	DMK	K. K. Deen	NCO	12,227
Lalgudi	V. N. Muthamil Selvan	DMK	D. Rengasamy Udayar	NCO	11,963
Madurai Central	K. Thirupathy	DMK	P. Nedumaran	NCO	3,210
Madurai East	K. Ramakrishnan	DMK	L. K. T. Muthuram	NCO	2,412
Madurai West	K. T. K. Thangamani	CPI	P. Anandam	NCO	9,146
Maduranthakam	C. Arumugam	DMK	V. Gopal Reddiar	NCO	19,049
Manamadurai	T. Soniah	DMK	S. Sankaralingam	NCO	10,179
Mangalore	G. Jabamalai	DMK	R. Perumal	NCO	11,498
Mannargudi	K. Balakrishnan	DMK	T. S. Swaminatha Udayar	NCO	7,128
Mayuram	N. Kittappa	DMK	M. R. Krishnappa	NCO	1,019
Melapalayam	M. Kather Mohideen	MUL	C. Shanmugavel	NCO	13,685
Melmalayanur	R. R. Munusami	DMK	K. Gopal Gounder	NCO	8,872
Melur North	P. Malaichamy	DMK	M. Andi Ambalam	NCO	127
Melur South	O. P. Raman	DMK	C. Karuthanan	NCO	16,876
Mettupalayam	M. C. Thooyamani	DMK	Ramaswami	IND	8,460
Mettur	M. Surendran	PSP	Karuppanna Gounder	NCO	11,118
Modakkurichi	M. Chinnasami	DMK	M. Chenniappan	SOP	13,677
Mudukulathur	Kadher Batcha alias Vellaichind	IND	R. C. Subramaniam	NCO	735
Mugaiyur	A. G. Padmavathi	DMK	K. A. Ranganathan	NCO	19,139
Musiri	P. S. Muthuselvan	DMK	A. R. Murugaiah	NCO	10,859
Mylapore	T. N. Anandanayaki	NCO	M. P. Sivagnanam	DMK	7703
Nagapattinam	Rajamanickam	DMK	Ramanatha Thevar	NCO	6,402
Nagercoil	M. Moses	SWA	G. Christopher	DMK	541
Namakkal	Palanivelan	DMK	Kaliappan	NCO	9,106
Nanguneri	T. Ganapathy	DMK	S. T. Thavasikani	NCO	4,236
Nannilam	A. Devandiran	DMK	V. S. Arunachalam	NCO	15,308
Natrampalli	T. C. Thimmaraya Gounder	DMK	K. Shanmugasundaram	NCO	6,421
Nellikuppam	V. Krishnamurthi Gounder	DMK	K. G. Kandan	NCO	5,820
Nilakkottai	A. Muniyandi	DMK	A. S. Ponnammal	NCO	1,043
Oddanchatram	N. Nachimuthu Gounder	DMK	A. P. Palaniyappan	NCO	13,191
Orathanad	L. Ganesan	DMK	Dhandayudhapani	NCO	22,986
Omalur	V. Selladurai	DMK	C. Govindan	NCO	10,758
Palani	C. Palanisamy	DMK	R. Subramanian	NCO	14,330
Palladam	K. N. Kumarasamy	PSP	R. Sengaliappan	NCO	13,806
Pollachi	A. P. Shanmugasundara Gounder	DMK	A. Easwarasamy Gounder	IND	18,258
Pongalur	N. Palanisamy	DMK	A. Senapathi	IND	18,431
Ottapidaram	M. Muthiah	FBL	K. Manoharan	SWA	9,710
Padmanabhapuram	A. Swamidhas Nadar	NCO	G. C. Michael	DMK	15,242
Palacode	M. V. Karivengadam	DMK	B. K. Narasimhan	NCO	3,377
Panamarathupatti	Karipatti T. Ponnumalai	DMK	P. Chinnu	NCO	8,978
Papanasam	N. Ganapathy	DMK	V. Ramakrishnan	NCO	9,613
Panruti	S. Ramachandran	DMK	S. V. Vadivelu Padayachi	NCO	8,985
Paramakudi	T. K. Siraimeettan	DMK	K. V. Rakkan	NCO	17,750
Park Town	H. V. Hande	SWA	A. V. P. Asaithambi	DMK	5,287
Pattukkottai	A. R. Marimuthu	PSP	N. Nagarajan	NCO	18,336
Pennagaram	N. Manickam	DMK	P. K. C. Muthuswami	NCO	3,007
Perambalur	J. S. Raju	DMK	K. Periyannan	NCO	15,708
Perambur	Sathyavani Muthu	DMK	D. Sulochana	NCO	12,023
Peravurani	Chelliah	IND	M. Krishnamoorthy	DMK	2,020
Periakulam	Anbucheliyan	DMK	Chinnasamy Chettai	NCO	9,595
Pernamallur	P. Ettiappan	DMK	Boopalan	NCO	17,603
Pernambattu	N. Krishnan	DMK	P. Rajagopal	NCO	14,139
Perundurai	N. K. Palanisamy	CPI	K. Chinnasamy Gounder	IND	8,782
Perur	N. Marudachalam	CPI	K. P. Palanisami	NCO	17,963
Polur	T. P. Srinivasan	DMK	T. R. Natesa Gounder	NCO	9,496
Ponneri	p. Nagalingam	DMK	T. P. Elumalai	NCO	18,133
Pudukkottai	M. Sathiamoorthy	NCO	K. R. Subbiah	CPI	1,287
Purasawalkam	K. Anbazhagan	DMK	Bashyam Reddy	NCO	12,166
Radhapuram	V. Karthesan	DMK	K. P. Karuthiah	NCO	2,189
Rajapalayam	K. Suppu	CPI	K. R. Srirenga Raja	NCO	664
Ramanathapuram	M. S. K. Sathiyendan	DMK	R. Balagangadharan	NCO	21,041
Ranipet	K. A. Wahab	IND	A. G. Ranganatha Naicker	NCO	5,335
Rasipuram	R. Nainamalai	DMK	P. Ganapathy	NCO	9,918
Rishivandiyam	N. Dharmalingam	DMK	K. Mappan	NCO	2,108
Saidapet	M. Karunanidhi	DMK	N. Kamalingam	NCO	12,511
Sankarapuram	N. Natichiyappan	DMK	Durai. Muthusamy	NCO	72
Sathankulam	K. P. Kandasamy	DMK	T. Martin	NCO	4,918
St. Thomas Mount	M. G. Ramachandran	DMK	T. L. Raghupathy	NCO	24,632
Salem - I	K. Jayaraman	DMK	P. Thiagarajan	NCO	3,395
Salem - II	K. Rajaram	DMK	R. Ramakrishnan	NCO	5,308
Sankarankoil	S. Subbiah	DMK	M. Jame	NCO	13,658
Sankari	V. Muthur	DMK	P. T. Seerangan	NCO	10,319
Sathyamangalam	S. K. Subramaniam	DMK	P. G. Karuthiruman	NCO	8,986
Sattur	S. Alagu Thevar	FBL	R. Dorairaj Naicker	SWA	8,394
Sedapatti	V. Thavamani Thevar	FBL	M. K. Ramakrishnan	SWA	4,946
Sembanarkoil	T. V. Sampath	DMK	K. R. Sambandam	NCO	14,490
Sendamangalam	Chinna Velaiya Gounder	DMK	Vellaya Gounder	NCO	13,055
Sholavandan	P. S. Maniyan	DMK	R. Sundararajan Servai	NCO	8,712
Sholinghur	A. M. Ponnurangam	NCO	K. M. Natarajan	DMK	7,155
Singanallur	A. Subramaniam	PSP	P. L. Subbian	NCO	15,040
Sirkazhi	S. Vadivel	CPI	K. B. S. Mani	NCO	6,310
Sivaganga	S. Sethuraman	DMK	O. Subramanian	NCO	17,666
Sivakasi	K. Kalimuthu	DMK	N. Sundarraj Naicker	SWA	14,368
Sriperumbudur	D. Rajarathinam	DMK	Manali Ramakrishna Mudaliar	NCO	14,416
Srirangam	Jothi Venkatachalam	NCO	R. Kamatchiammal	DMK	2,933
Srivaikuntam	Adithanar	DMK	R. A. R. Annamalai	NCO	9,605
Srivilliputhur	K. Surusamy	DMK	S. P. Dharmaraj	NCO	17,486
Talavasal	Moo. Marimuthu	DMK	T. R. Sappan	NCO	3,182
Taramangalam	Paramasivam	DMK	Ramasamy Gounder	NCO	12,693
Tenkasi	Kathiravan alias Samshudeen	DMK	I. C. Iswaran	NCO	7,960
Thandarambattu	M. S. Radhakrishnan	DMK	K. Sahadeva Gounder	NCO	11,391
Thanjavur	S. Natarajan	DMK	A. Y. Arokiasamy Nadar	NCO	7,865
Theni	P. T. R. Palanivel Rajan	DMK	Ramasamy	NCO	20,037
T. Nagar	K. M. Subramaniam	NCO	D. V. Narayanasamy	DMK	879
Thirumangalam	M. C. A. Rethinasamy Thevar	FBL	N. S. V. Chithan	NCO	8,920
Thirumayam	A. Thiagarajan	DMK	P. R. Ramanathan	NCO	14,277
Thirupparankundram	C. Kaverimaniam	DMK	I. Pandy Thevar	NCO	12,230
Thiruthuraipundi	C. Manali Kandasami	CPI	G. Thazamanavan	NCO	18,596
Thiruvadanai	P. R. Shanmugham	DMK	K. R. Kariamanickam Ambalam	SWA	6,960
Thiruvaiyaru	G. Ilangovan	DMK	K. B. Palani	NCO	7,326
Thiruvarambur	Kamaichi	DMK	V. Swaminathan	NCO	4,975
Thiruvarur	M. Karunanidhi	DMK	V. Vedaiyan	NCO	12,142
Thiruvattar	J. James	NCO	J. Hemachandran	CPM	21,782
Thondamuthur	R. Manickavasakam	DMK	M. Nataraj	IND	21,492
Thottiyam	S. K. Vadivelu	DMK	K. M. Shanmughasundaram	NCO	2,244
Thousand lights	K. A. Mathiazhagan	DMK	N. M. Mani Varma	NCO	11,559
Tindivanam	G. Rajaram	DMK	K. Ramamurthy	NCO	11,885
Tiruchendur	Edmund	DMK	Ganesa Sundaram	NCO	5,929
Tiruchengode	S. Kandappan	DMK	V. Kumarasamy	NCO	19,260
Tiruchy - I	V. Krishnamurthy	DMK	A. S. G. Lourdusamy Pillai	NCO	4,649
Tiruchy - II	Anbil P. Dharmalingam	DMK	Subramanian	NCO	9,298
Tirukkoilur	A. S. Kumarasamy	DMK	A. Vadivel	NCO	7,349
Tirunelveli	P. Padmanabhan	DMK	Rajathi Kunchithapatham	NCO	16,952
Tiruppattur (41)	G. Ramasamy	DMK	Y. Shanmugam	NCO	7,400
Tiruppattur (191)	S. Madhavan	DMK	S. Sethuramalingam	NCO	31,070
Tirupporur	M. Munu Adhi	DMK	T. M. dhanapal	NCO	15,237
Tiruppur	S. Doraisamy	DMK	S. A. Khader	IND	7,767
Tiruttani	E. S. Thyagarajan	DMK	A. Eakambara Reddz	NCO	16,498
Tiruvallur	S. M. Dorairaj	DMK	V. S. Arunachalam	NCO	18,737
Tiruvannamalai	P. U. Shanmugham	DMK	D. Annamalai Pillai	NCO	18,310
Tiruvottiyur	M. V. Narayanaswamy	DMK	Venkatesalu Naidu	NCO	16,096
Triplicane	V. R. Nedunchezhiyan	DMK	K. Vinayakam	NCO	1,039
Tuticorin	R. Ramalingam	DMK	Naorojiammal	NCO	9,557
Udagamandalam	M. Devarajan	DMK	M. B. Nanjan	SWA	11,239
Uddanapalle	K. S. Kothandaramaiah	IND	N. Ramachandra Reddy	NCO	470
Udumalpet	S. J. Sadiq Pasha	DMK	T. Malayappa Gounder	IND	19,482
Ulundurpet	V. Subramaniam	DMK	N. Ponnambalam	NCO	10,955
Uppiliyapuram	T. P. Alagamuthu	DMK	R. Periasami	NCO	6,807
Usilampatti	P. K. Mookiah Thevar	FBL	S. Andi Thevar	IND	32,383
Uthankarai	K. R. Krishnan	DMK	M. Raman	NCO	11,864
Uthiramerur	E. M. rajagopal	DMK	C. Ramasamy	NCO	28,566
Vadamadurai	K. Nagarajan	DMK	S. Rajendran	NCO	10,719
Valangiman	N. Somasundaram	DMK	V. Thangavelu	NCO	14,168
Valparai	E. Ramaswamy	DMK	M. Kuppuswamy	NCO	24,051
Vandavasi	V. Rajagopal	DMK	D. Dasarathan	NCO	17,987
Vaniyambadi	M. A. Latheef	IND	R. C. Samanna Gounder	NCO	8,817
Vanur	N. Muthuvel	DMK	A. Venkatachalam	NCO	14,815
Varahur	K. Palanivelan	DMK	K. C. Periyasamy	NCO	16,690
Vasudevanallur	A. Velladurai	DMK	A. Gopa Thevar	NCO	8,785
Vedaranyam	M. Meenakshi Sundaram	DMK	P. C. Velayudhan	NCO	24,309
Vedasandur	P. Muthusamy	DMK	S. Nanjunda Rao	NCO	13,739
Veerapandy	S. Arumugam	DMK	T. V. Thirumalai	NCO	22,920
Vellakoil	M. Palanisamy	DMK	S. M. Ramasamy Gounder	IND	25,836
Vellore	Ma. Pa. Sarathy	DMK	A. K. Lalalajapathy	NCO	6,567
Vilathikulam	M. Rathinasabapathy	DMK	K. Subba Reddiar	NCO	10,486
Vilavancode	R. Ponnappan Nadar	NCO	G. Gnanaraj Christopher	DMK	20,969
Villupuram	M. Shanmugam	DMK	V. P. Sarangapani Gounder	NCO	7,276
Viralimalai	V. S. Lenchezhiyan	DMK	A. Karuppiah Udayar	NCO	11,539
Virudhunagar	P. Seenivasan	DMK	V. Seenivasaga Naidu	SWA	1,577
Vridachalam	M. Selvaraj	DMK	B. Thiyagarajan	NCO	7,198
Washermanpet	M. Vedachalam	DMK	Ananthan	NCO	6,758
Yercaud	V. Chinnusamy	DMK	K. Chinna Gounden	NCO	10,378

== See also ==
- Elections in Tamil Nadu
- Legislature of Tamil Nadu
- Government of Tamil Nadu
