= 1971 Tamil Nadu Legislative Assembly election =

Indian election

- 1–7 March 1971

All 234 seats in the Legislature of Tamil Nadu 118 seats needed for a majority
- Turnout: 72.10% (▼4.47%)
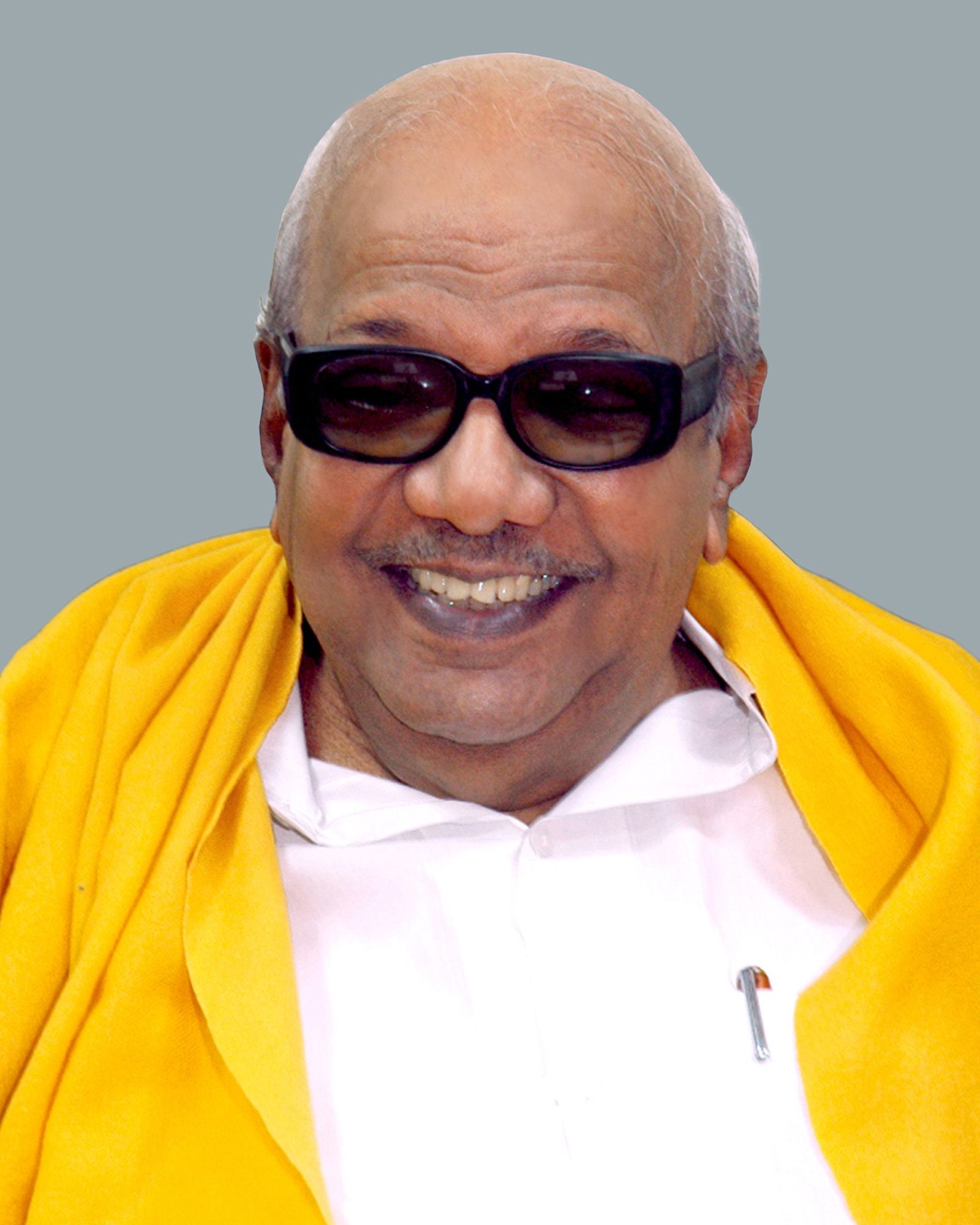

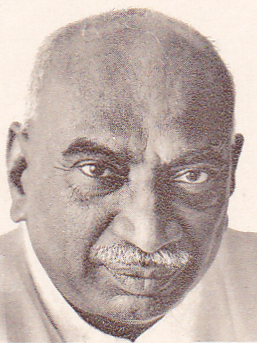
	First party	Second party
Leader	M. Karunanidhi	K. Kamaraj
Party	DMK	INC(O)
Alliance	Progressive Front	Democratic Front
Leader's seat	Saidapet	Did Not Contest (Note: Kamaraj was the sitting MP for Nagercoil.)
Seats won	184	15
Seat change	▲47	New Party
Popular vote	7,654,935	5,513,894
Percentage	48.58%	34.99%
Swing	▲7.89%	New
Alliance seats	205	21
Alliance seat change	▲26	▼50
Alliance popular vote	85,06,078	60,16,530
Alliance percentage	54.30%	38.18%
Chief Minister before election
M. Karunanidhi
DMK
Elected Chief Minister
M. Karunanidhi
DMK

The fifth legislative assembly election of Tamil Nadu was held in March 1971, resulting in a re-election victory for the Dravida Munnetra Kazhagam (DMK), which had first won under the leadership of C. N. Annadurai in 1967. The main opposition was the Indian National Congress (Organisation) led by K. Kamaraj, while the Indian National Congress (Indira) faction aligned with the DMK. This election marked the first victory for M. Karunanidhi as DMK leader, who assumed office as Chief Minister after Annadurai’s death. Karunanidhi, supported by M. G. Ramachandran (MGR) in a leadership dispute with V. R. Nedunchezhiyan, secured his position with MGR and Vai. Balasundaram’s instrumental backing.

This election also set a precedent in national politics, as the Indian National Congress (Indira)—led by Indira Gandhi—formed a coalition with the DMK. This agreement allowed the DMK to take all seats in the state legislature, while conceding half of Tamil Nadu's seats in the Lok Sabha to the Congress.

With a 48.58% vote share and 184 seats, DMK achieved the largest single-party vote and seat count in Tamil Nadu's electoral history. This remains the only instance where a DMK-led government in Tamil Nadu retained power, as all subsequent DMK administrations have been succeeded by rival coalitions.

The state government was dismissed in January 1976 during Emergency, citing non-cooperation with the central government, just before completing 5 years in office, and President's Rule was imposed. The next assembly elections were held in June 1977.

== Background ==
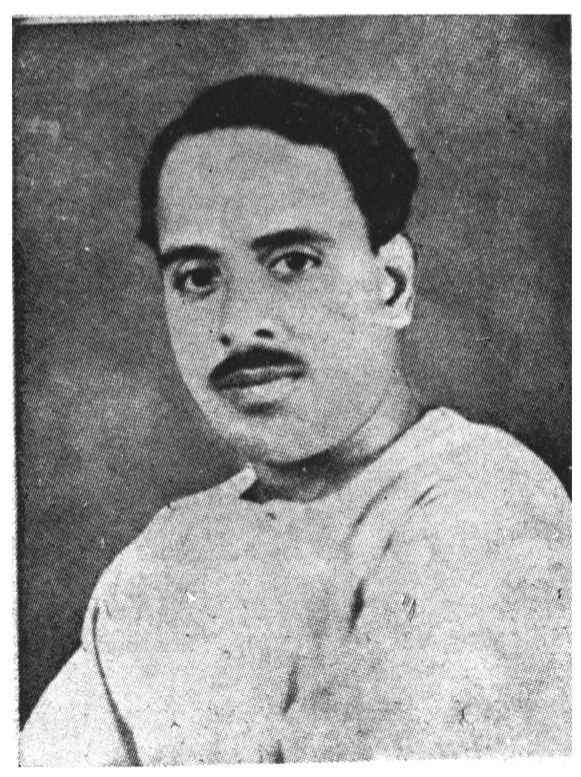
C. N. Annadurai
1909–1969

The fifth legislative assembly election is the first election to the body after the death of the most prominent and first Chief Minister of Tamil Nadu, C. N. Annadurai.

The opposition party, Indian National Congress was heavily weakened due to a split that occurred in 1969. This led to the formation of Indian National Congress (Organisation) under K. Kamaraj, which was the major opposition in this election, while the Indian National Congress, supported the Dravida Munnetra Kazhagam. Indira Gandhi continued as Prime Minister with the support of Communist parties and DMK which had 25 seats in the Lok Sabha. It was during this time that the long-awaited Salem steel mill was approved. The ruling Congress party decided to dissolve the Lok Sabha and conduct early elections to use the popularity from Bangladesh War victory. Then Chief minister of Tamil nadu M. Karunanidhi also decided to dissolve the state assembly and face the elections in alliance with Indira's Congress one year before the end of his term.

This election marked the most recent instance in which the Tamil Nadu Legislative Assembly election was conducted in multiple phases, with polling held over three days, 1 March, 4 March, and 7 March.

== Parties and alliances ==
The Dravida Munnetra Kazhagam (DMK) formed a seven-party alliance known as the Left and Democratic Front (Progressive Front). This coalition was led by the DMK and included the Indian National Congress (Indira), Communist Party of India (CPI), Praja Socialist Party, All India Forward Bloc, Muslim League, and M. P. Sivagnanam's Tamil National Party. The Congress party, reliant on DMK votes in the Lok Sabha for its survival, had no influence over seating arrangements. The Indira Congress contested in nine out of 39 parliamentary constituencies but did not participate in legislative assembly contests. Indira Gandhi directed the Tamil Nadu Congress leader, C. Subramaniam, to accept this arrangement, signaling a shift in the party's focus away from Tamil Nadu as a Congress stronghold.

The opposition front was a coalition of Kamaraj led Indian National Congress (Organisation) (Congress (O)), which joined hands with rival Rajaji's Swatantara Party, Samyukta Socialist Party, the Tamil Nadu Toilers' Party, the Republican Party and the Coimbatore District Agriculturist Association in a bid to unseat the DMK government from power.

== Seat Allotment ==
=== DMK Front ===
Progressive Front
Party	Flag	Symbol	Leader	Seats	
Dravida Munnetra Kazhagam			M. Karunanidhi	201	203
Tamil Arasu Kazhagam			M. P. Sivagnanam	2	203
Communist Party of India			M. Kalyanasundaram	10	
All India Forward Bloc			P. K. Mookiah Thevar	9	
Indian Union Muslim League (Note: Scales Symbol was Independent Symbol throughout India, except Punjab in 1971 elections.)			Muhammed Ismail	7	
Praja Socialist Party				4	
Independent			T. Venkata Reddy	1	
Total				234	

=== INC(O) Front ===
NOTE: Two Leaves was free election symbol before 1972.

Democratic Front
Party	Flag	Symbol	Leader	Seats	
Indian National Congress (Organization)			K. Kamaraj	194	201
Uzhaippalar Katchi				6	201
Republican Party of India				1	201
Swatantra Party			C. Rajagopalachari	19	
Coimbatore District Agriculturist Association				10 (Note: Coimbatore District Agriculturist Association contested as independents under Syndicate Congress-led Alliance.)	
Samyukta Socialist Party			George Fernandes	2	
Revolutionary Forward Bloc			S. Andi Thevar	1	
Tamil Nadu Teachers Association				1 (Note: Tamil Nadu Teachers Association contested as independents under Syndicate Congress-led Alliance.)	
Total				234	

== Voting and results ==
=== Results ===
Source: Election Commission of India

Alliances	Party	Popular Vote	Vote %	Seats contested	Seats won	Change
Progressive Front; Seats: 205; Seat Change: +26; Popular Vote: 8,506,078; Popular Vote %: 54.30%	Dravida Munnetra Kazhagam	7,654,935	48.58%	203	184	▲47
Progressive Front; Seats: 205; Seat Change: +26; Popular Vote: 8,506,078; Popular Vote %: 54.30%	Communist Party of India	364,803	2.32%	10	8	▲6
Progressive Front; Seats: 205; Seat Change: +26; Popular Vote: 8,506,078; Popular Vote %: 54.30%	All India Forward Bloc	268,721	1.71%	9	7	▲6
Progressive Front; Seats: 205; Seat Change: +26; Popular Vote: 8,506,078; Popular Vote %: 54.30%	Praja Socialist Party	147,985	0.94%	4	4	—
Progressive Front; Seats: 205; Seat Change: +26; Popular Vote: 8,506,078; Popular Vote %: 54.30%	Indian Union Muslim League	69,634	0.44%	2	2	▼1
Democratic Front; Seats: 21; Seat Change: -50; Popular Vote: 6,016,530; Popular Vote %: 38.18%	Indian National Congress (Organisation)	5,513,894	34.99%	201	15	New Party
Democratic Front; Seats: 21; Seat Change: -50; Popular Vote: 6,016,530; Popular Vote %: 38.18%	Swatantra Party	465,145	2.95%	19	6	▼14
Democratic Front; Seats: 21; Seat Change: -50; Popular Vote: 6,016,530; Popular Vote %: 38.18%	Socialist Party	37,491	0.24%	2	0	—
Others; Seats: 8 Seat Change: Popular Vote: 1,234,193; Popular Vote %: 7.52%	Independent	965,379	6.13%	256	8	
Others; Seats: 8 Seat Change: Popular Vote: 1,234,193; Popular Vote %: 7.52%	Communist Party of India (Marxist)	259,298	1.65%	37	0	
Total	10 Political Parties	15,756,801	—	—	234	—

=== Results by district ===
District	Seats			
District	Seats	DMK+	INC(O)+	OTH
Chengalpattu	15	15	—N/a	—N/a
Madras	12	8	3	1
North Arcot	22	19	1	2
South Arcot	21	20	—N/a	1
Dharmapuri	9	7	1	1
Salem	17	17	—N/a	—N/a
Coimbatore	25	24	—N/a	1
Nilgiris	3	2	1	—N/a
Tiruchirapalli	22	19	3	—N/a
Thanjavur	23	21	1	1
Madurai	22	19	3	—N/a
Ramanathapuram	17	16	—N/a	1
Tirunelveli	19	17	2	—N/a
Kanyakumari	7	1	6	—N/a
Total	234	205	21	8

=== By Region ===
Alliance-wise Results
Region	Total Seats	DMK-led Progressive Front	INC(O)-led Democratic Front	Others
Northern Tamil Nadu	70	62 / 70 (89%)	4 / 70 (6%)	4 / 70 (6%)
Western Tamil Nadu	54	50 / 54 (93%)	2 / 54 (4%)	2 / 54 (4%)
Southern Tamil Nadu	65	53 / 65 (82%)	11 / 65 (17%)	1 / 65 (2%)
Central Tamil Nadu	45	40 / 45 (89%)	4 / 45 (9%)	1 / 45 (2%)

=== By constituency ===
Winner, runner-up, voter turnout, and victory margin in every constituency
District	Assembly Constituency		Winner				Runner Up				Margin
District	#	Name	Candidate	Party	Votes	%	Candidate	Party	Votes	%	Margin
Madras	1	Washermanpet	M. Vedachalam	DMK	38,989	54.04	Ananthan	INC	32,231	44.68	6,758
Madras	2	Harbour	A M Mohideen	IND	29,225	49.44	Umapathy G	INC	28,739	48.62	486
Madras	3	Basin Bridge	M. R. Kannan	DMK	48,959	56.73	K. Ramadoss	INC	33,174	38.44	15,785
Madras	4	Park Town	H. V. Hande	SWA	30,743	54.7	A. V. P. Asaithambi	DMK	25,456	45.3	5,287
Madras	5	Perambur	Sathyavani Muthu	DMK	49,070	56.37	D Sulochana	INC	37,047	42.56	12,023
Madras	6	Purasawalkam	K. Anbazhagan	DMK	47,182	56.13	Bashyam Reddy	INC	35,016	41.65	12,166
Madras	7	Egmore	Arangannal	DMK	40,596	53.19	M Kothandapani	INC	35,733	46.81	4,863
Madras	8	Thousand Lights	K. A. Mathiazhagan	DMK	38,891	57.39	N M Mani Varma	INC	27,332	40.33	11,559
Madras	9	Triplicane	V. R. Nedunchezhiyan	DMK	36,237	50.4	K Vinayakam	INC	35,198	48.95	1,039
Madras	10	Mylapore	T. N. Anandanayaki	INC	42,301	55.01	M. P. Sivagnanam	DMK	34,598	44.99	7,703
Madras	11	Thiyagaraya Nagar	K M Subramaniam	INC	37,100	48.32	D V Narayanasamy	DMK	36,221	47.18	879
Madras	12	Saidapet	M. Karunanidhi	DMK	63,334	54.46	N Kamalingam	INC	50,823	43.7	12,511
Chengalpattu	13	Gummidipoondi	K. A. Vezhavendan	DMK	43,355	58.41	P Obul Reddy	INC	30,875	41.59	12,480
Chengalpattu	14	Ponneri	P. Nagalingam	DMK	39,783	58.39	T. P. Elumalai	INC	21,650	31.77	18,133
Chengalpattu	15	Thiruvottiyur	M V Narayanaswamy	DMK	51,487	53.74	Venkatesalu Naidu	INC	35,391	36.94	16,096
Chengalpattu	16	St Thomas Mount	M. G. Ramachandran	DMK	65,405	61.11	T L Raghupathy	INC	40,773	38.1	24,632
Chengalpattu	17	Thiruporur	M Munu Adhi	DMK	40,187	57	T M Dhanapal	INC	24,950	35.39	15,237
Chengalpattu	18	Chengalpattu	C. G. Viswanathan	DMK	41,949	62.09	S T Neelakantan	INC	18,290	27.07	23,659
Chengalpattu	19	Maduranthakam	C. Arumugam	DMK	42,295	64.53	V Gopal Reddiar	INC	23,246	35.47	19,049
Chengalpattu	20	Acharapakkam	Vai.Balasundaram	DMK	39,816	66.77	C Ganesan	INC	13,457	22.57	26,359
Chengalpattu	21	Uthiramerur	K M Erasagopal	DMK	48,462	68.85	C Ramasamy	INC	19,896	28.27	28,566
Chengalpattu	22	Kancheepuram	C. V. M. Annamalai	DMK	44,009	52.52	D. V. Natesa Mudaliar	INC	37,697	44.98	6,312
Chengalpattu	23	Kunnathur	M. Gopal	DMK	47,126	64.48	P. Appavoo	INC	24,488	33.5	22,638
Chengalpattu	24	Sriperumbudur	D. Rajarathinam	DMK	46,617	59.15	Manali Ramakrishna Mudaliar	INC	32,201	40.85	14,416
Chengalpattu	25	Kadambathur	A Parandhaman	DMK	38,569	67.11	Era Kulasekaran	INC	18,903	32.89	19,666
Chengalpattu	26	Thiruvallur	S. M. Dorairaj	DMK	36,496	62.81	V. S. Arunachalam	INC	17,759	30.56	18,737
Chengalpattu	27	Tiruttani	E. S. Thyagarajan	DMK	43,436	61.72	A. Ekambara Reddy	INC	26,938	38.28	16,498
North Arcot	28	Arakkonam	N. S. Balaraman	DMK	42,256	60.11	S. K. Subramania Mudaly	INC	26,878	38.24	15,378
North Arcot	29	Sholingur	A. M. Ponnuranga Mudaliar	INC	36,776	55.39	Natrajan K. M.	DMK	29,621	44.61	7,155
North Arcot	30	Ranipet	K. A Wahab	IND	36,357	53.96	A. G. Ranganatha Naicker	INC	31,022	46.04	5,335
North Arcot	31	Arcot	N. Veerasami	DMK	39,126	57.79	N. R. Ethirajalu Naidu	INC	25,061	37.02	14,065
North Arcot	32	Katpadi	Durai Murugan	DMK	37,487	57.79	Dhandayuthapani	INC	20,919	32.25	16,568
North Arcot	33	Gudiyatham	Duraisami F. K.	DMK	34,954	56.38	Adimoolam D. A.	INC	18,580	29.97	16,374
North Arcot	34	Pernambattu	N. Krishnan	DMK	35,804	59.61	P. Rajagopal	INC	21,665	36.07	14,139
North Arcot	35	Natrampalli	T. C. Thimmaraya Gounder	DMK	33,303	55.33	K. Shanmugasundaram	INC	26,882	44.67	6,421
North Arcot	36	Tirupattur (Vellore)	Ramasamy G.	DMK	37,120	55.54	Y. Shammugan	INC	29,720	44.46	7,400
North Arcot	37	Vaniyambadi	M. Abdul Lathief	IND	27,899	56.13	R. C. Samanna Gounder	INC	19,082	38.39	8,817
North Arcot	38	Ambur	M. Panneerselvam	DMK	32,937	55.17	Adimoolam M.	INC	21,449	35.93	11,488
North Arcot	39	Kaniyambadi	Thopputhiruvengadam	DMK	34,435	54.11	L. Balaraman	INC	24,647	38.73	9,788
North Arcot	40	Vellore	M. P. Sarathy	DMK	38,968	52.85	A. K. Lalalajapathy	INC	32,401	43.94	6,567
North Arcot	41	Arani	A. C. Narasimhan	DMK	37,682	60.5	M. Darumarajan	INC	24,599	39.5	13,083
North Arcot	42	Cheyyar	K. Govindan	DMK	39,978	55.79	Perumalsamy Nayagar	INC	31,677	44.21	8,301
North Arcot	43	Vandavasi	V. Rajagopal	DMK	41,452	63.85	D. Dasarathan	INC	23,465	36.15	17,987
North Arcot	44	Pernamallur	P. Ettiappan	DMK	39,160	64.5	Boopalan	INC	21,557	35.5	17,603
North Arcot	45	Polur	T. P. Srinivasan	DMK	34,728	57.92	Natesa Gounder T. R.	INC	25,232	42.08	9,496
North Arcot	46	Chengam	C. Pandurangam	DMK	32,260	61.39	A. Ar. Mugam	INC	16,705	31.79	15,555
North Arcot	47	Thandarambattu	M. S. Radhakrishnan	DMK	37,991	58.82	Sahadeva Ginder K.	INC	26,600	41.18	11,391
North Arcot	48	Kalasapakkam	S. Murugaiyan	DMK	42,893	58.88	M. Sundraswamy	INC	29,960	41.12	12,933
North Arcot	49	Tiruvannamalai	P. U. Shanmugam	DMK	46,633	62.21	D. Annamalai Pillai	INC	28,323	37.79	18,310
South Arcot	50	Melmalayanur	R. R. Munusami	DMK	31,166	53.54	Gopal Gounder K.	INC	22,294	38.3	8,872
South Arcot	51	Gingee	S. Sagadeva Gounder	DMK	39,397	59.67	V. Perumal Nainar	INC	26,625	40.33	12,772
South Arcot	52	Tindivanam	Rajaram G.	DMK	33,933	55.83	K. Ramamurthy	INC	22,048	36.27	11,885
South Arcot	53	Vanur	N. Muthuvel	DMK	34,121	59.81	A. Venkatachalam	INC	19,306	33.84	14,815
South Arcot	54	Kandamagalam	M. Raman	DMK	32,293	57.33	P. P. Mathavan	INC	20,628	36.62	11,665
South Arcot	55	Villupuram	M. Shanmugam	DMK	35,838	51.41	V. P. Sharangapani Gounder	INC	28,562	40.98	7,276
South Arcot	56	Nellikuppam	V. Krishnamurthy Gounder	DMK	27,741	44.93	K. G. Kandan	INC	21,921	35.5	5,820
South Arcot	57	Cuddalore	R. Govindaraj	DMK	35,219	52.6	P. R. Seenivasa Padayachi	INC	30,909	46.17	4,310
South Arcot	58	Panruti	S. Ramachandaran	DMK	42,141	52.06	S. V. Vadivelu Padayachi	INC	33,156	40.96	8,985
South Arcot	59	Kurinjipadi	N. Rajangam	DMK	27,465	51.43	M. Jayaraman	INC	25,939	48.57	1,526
South Arcot	60	Bhuvanagiri	M. A. Abusali	IND	28,615	44.31	R. Balakrishnan	INC	23,291	36.06	5,324
South Arcot	61	Kattumannarkoil	S. Perumal	DMK	32,847	51.72	T. M. Kuppusami	INC	29,551	46.53	3,296
South Arcot	62	Chidambaram	P. Ponchokkalingam	DMK	35,750	50.33	R. Gopalkrishnan	INC	34,071	47.97	1,679
South Arcot	63	Vriddhachalam	M. Selvaraj	DMK	42,132	54.26	B. Thiyagarajan	INC	34,934	44.99	7,198
South Arcot	64	Mangalore	G. Jabamalai	DMK	32,612	52.24	R. Perumal	INC	21,114	33.82	11,498
South Arcot	65	Ulundurpet	V. Subramanian	DMK	36,191	57.87	N. Po. Nambalam	INC	25,236	40.36	10,955
South Arcot	66	Tirukkoyilur	A. S. Kumarasamy	DMK	38,520	55.27	A. Vadivel	INC	31,171	44.73	7,349
South Arcot	67	Mugaiyur	A. G. Padmavathi	DMK	38,744	59.98	K. A. Ranganathan	INC	19,605	30.35	19,139
South Arcot	68	Rishivandiyam	N. Dharmalingam	DMK	29,350	51.86	Mappan K.	INC	27,242	48.14	2,108
South Arcot	69	Sankarapuram	N. Natchiyappan	DMK	28,544	50.06	Duraimuthusamy	INC	28,472	49.94	72
South Arcot	70	Kallakurichi	D. Kesavalu	DMK	38,513	52.84	S. Sivaraman	INC	34,374	47.16	4,139
Dharmapuri	71	Hosur	B. Venkataswamy	SWA	28,259	63.81	T. Venkata Reddy	IND	15,063	34.01	13,196
Dharmapuri	72	Uddanapalle	K. S. Kothanadaramaiah	IND	13,854	32.2	N. Ramachandra Reddy	INC	13,384	31.11	470
Dharmapuri	73	Krishnagiri	C. Manniappan	DMK	31,445	63	T. G. Selvaraj	INC	18,471	37	12,974
Dharmapuri	74	Kaveripatnam	V. C. Govindasamy Gounder	DMK	41,546	64.98	E. Pattabi Naidu	INC	22,391	35.02	19,155
Dharmapuri	75	Uttangarai	K. R. Krishnan	DMK	36,256	57.3	M. Raman	INC	24,392	38.55	11,864
Dharmapuri	76	Harur	S. A. Chinnaraju	DMK	33,039	54.26	M. Ponnusamy	INC	24,159	39.68	8,880
Dharmapuri	77	Dharmapuri	R. Chinnasamy	DMK	39,861	54.16	D. N. Adivel	INC	27,834	37.82	12,027
Dharmapuri	78	Palacode	M. V. Karivengadam	DMK	32,378	52.84	B. K. Narashiman	INC	28,901	47.16	3,477
Dharmapuri	79	Pennagaram	N. Manickkam	DMK	33,298	52.36	P. K. C. Muthuswami	INC	30,291	47.64	3,007
Salem	80	Mettur	M. Surendran	PSP	32,656	57.45	Karuppanna Gounder	INC	21,538	37.89	11,118
Salem	81	Taramangalam	Paramasivam	DMK	33,257	61.79	Ramasamy Gounder	INC	20,564	38.21	12,693
Salem	82	Omalur	V. Selladurai	DMK	26,065	60.81	C. Govindan	INC	15,307	35.71	10,758
Salem	83	Salem I	K. Jayaraman	DMK	46,262	50.92	P. Thiagarajan	INC	42,867	47.19	3,395
Salem	84	Salem I I	K. Rajaram	DMK	37,152	52.77	R. Ramakrishnan	INC	31,844	45.23	5,308
Salem	85	Yercaud	Chinnusamy V.	DMK	29,196	60.81	K. Chinna Gounden	INC	18,818	39.19	10,378
Salem	86	Panamrathupatti	Karipatti T. Ponnumalai	DMK	35,832	54.42	P. Chinnu Alias Seperumal	INC	26,854	40.79	8,978
Salem	87	Veerapandi	Veerapandy S. Arumugam	DMK	41,369	62.23	T. V. Thirumalai	INC	18,449	27.75	22,920
Salem	88	Edapadi	A. Arumugam	DMK	35,638	54.72	T. Natarajan	INC	29,485	45.28	6,153
Salem	89	Sankari	V. Muthur	DMK	27,741	60.73	P. T. Seerangan	INC	17,422	38.14	10,319
Salem	90	Tiruchengodu	S. Kandappan	DMK	43,605	60.89	V. Kumarasamy	INC	24,345	34	19,260
Salem	91	Kapilamalai	C. V. Velappan	DMK	43,022	55.74	P. Thyagarajan	INC	33,045	42.82	9,977
Salem	92	Namakkal	Palanivelan	DMK	39,553	53.57	Kaliappan	INC	30,447	41.23	9,106
Salem	93	Sendamangalam	Chinna Veilaiya Gounder	DMK	34,507	56.92	Vellaya Gounder	INC	21,452	35.38	13,055
Salem	94	Rasipuram	R. Nainamalai	DMK	41,079	54.9	P. Ganapathy	INC	31,161	41.64	9,918
Salem	95	Attur	V. Palanivel Gounder	DMK	39,828	52.79	C. Palanimuthu	INC	35,617	47.21	4,211
Salem	96	Talavasal	Moo. Marimuthu	DMK	32,195	48.67	T. Er. Sappan	INC	29,013	43.86	3,182
Nilgiris	97	Gudalur	K. H. Bomman	SWA	18,519	45.45	K. Putta	CPI	16,578	40.69	1,941
Nilgiris	98	Udhagamandalam	M. Devarajan	DMK	28,901	56.32	Nanjan M. B.	SWA	17,662	34.42	11,239
Nilgiris	99	Coonoor	J. Karunainathan	DMK	33,451	60.84	N. Andy	INC	15,325	27.87	18,126
Coimbatore	100	Mettupalayam	M. C. Thooyamani	DMK	39,013	56.08	Ramaswami	IND	30,553	43.92	8,460
Coimbatore	101	Avanashi	T. O. Periasamy	IND	29,356	49.9	K. Thangavellu	DMK	28,637	48.68	719
Coimbatore	102	Thondamuthur	R. Manickavasakam	DMK	51,181	60.3	M. Nataraj	IND	29,689	34.98	21,492
Coimbatore	103	Singanallur	A. Subramaniam	PSP	35,888	53.89	P. L. Subbian	INC	20,848	31.3	15,040
Coimbatore	104	Perur	N. Marudachalam	CPI	39,270	57.68	K. P. Palanisami	INC	21,307	31.3	17,963
Coimbatore	105	Coimbatore (West)	P. Gopal	DMK	34,736	55.47	S. S. Krishnaswamy	SWA	25,286	40.38	9,450
Coimbatore	106	Coimbatore (East)	K. Rangana Than	DMK	31,003	46.71	A. Devaraj	INC	27,491	41.42	3,512
Coimbatore	107	Kinathukadavu	M. Kannappan	DMK	47,776	68.42	S. T. Duraisamy	IND	22,049	31.58	25,727
Coimbatore	108	Pollachi	A. P. Shanmugasundara Goundar	DMK	41,654	63.53	A. Easwarasamy Gounder	IND	23,396	35.68	18,258
Coimbatore	109	Valparai	E. Ramaswamy	DMK	38,779	65.35	M. Kuppuswamy	INC	14,728	24.82	24,051
Coimbatore	110	Udumalaipettai	S. J. Sadiq Pasha	DMK	45,369	62.76	T. Malayappa Gounder	IND	25,887	35.81	19,482
Coimbatore	111	Dharapuram	V. P. Palaniammal	DMK	40,947	64.41	V. N. Gopal	INC	21,597	33.97	19,350
Coimbatore	112	Vellakoil	M. Pilanisamy	DMK	42,067	68.1	S. M. Ramaswamy Gounder	IND	16,231	26.28	25,836
Coimbatore	113	Kangayam	Kovai Chezhiyan	DMK	42,461	66.41	K. G. Palanisamy Gounder	IND	20,419	31.93	22,042
Coimbatore	114	Pongalur	N. Palanisamy	DMK	37,178	59.98	A. Senapathi	IND	18,747	30.24	18,431
Coimbatore	115	Palladam	K. N. Kumarasamy Gounder	PSP	34,876	57.57	R. Sengaliappan	INC	21,070	34.78	13,806
Coimbatore	116	Tiruppur	S. Duraisamy	DMK	40,762	54.88	Khader S. A.	IND	32,995	44.42	7,767
Coimbatore	117	Modakkurichi	M. Chinnasami	DMK	45,108	58.18	M. Chenniappan	Socialist Party (India)	31,431	40.54	13,677
Coimbatore	118	Perundurai	N. K. Palanisamy	CPI	38,882	56.37	K. Chinnasamy Gounder	IND	30,100	43.63	8,782
Coimbatore	119	Erode	M. Subramanian	DMK	47,809	61.16	K. P. Muthusamy	INC	30,358	38.84	17,451
Coimbatore	120	Bhavani	A. M. Raja	DMK	38,527	59.36	P. Kuppusamy Mudaliar	INC	25,480	39.26	13,047
Coimbatore	121	Anthiyur	E. M. Natarajan	DMK	32,691	56.79	K. S. Nanjappan	INC	24,876	43.21	7,815
Coimbatore	122	Gobichettipalayam	S. M. Palaniappan	DMK	35,184	59.45	K. M. Sundaramurthy	SWA	20,623	34.84	14,561
Coimbatore	123	Satyamangalam	Subramaniam Sk.	DMK	31,873	55.6	Karuthiruman P. G.	INC	22,887	39.93	8,986
Coimbatore	124	Bhavanisagar	V. K. Ramarasan	DMK	28,003	51.89	Velusamy M.	INC	20,992	38.89	7,011
Madurai	125	Oddanchatram	Nachimuthu Goundar N.	DMK	40,845	58.99	Palaniyappan A. P.	INC	27,654	39.94	13,191
Madurai	126	Palani	C. Palanisamy	DMK	38,919	55.79	Subramanian R.	INC	24,589	35.25	14,330
Madurai	127	Periyakulam	N. Anbuchezhian	DMK	37,926	56.85	Chinnasamy Chettai	INC	28,331	42.46	9,595
Madurai	128	Bodinayakkanur	M. Surulivel	DMK	35,427	54.43	Yellanna A.	IND	19,050	29.27	16,377
Madurai	129	Cumbum	Gopal K. P.	INC	34,483	48.87	Chellathurai P. S.	DMK	33,806	47.91	677
Madurai	130	Theni	P. T. R. Palanivel Rajan	DMK	45,785	64.01	Ramasamy	INC	25,748	35.99	20,037
Madurai	131	Andipatti	N. V. Gurusamy Naidu	SWA	20,814	36.37	Paramasivam S.	AIFB	16,682	29.15	4,132
Madurai	132	Sedapatti	Thavamani Thevar V.	AIFB	20,334	36.66	Ramakrishnan M. K.	SWA	15,388	27.75	4,946
Madurai	133	Tirumangalam	M. C. A. Rethinasamy Thevar	AIFB	36,468	56.97	N. S. V. Chitthan	INC	27,548	43.03	8,920
Madurai	134	Usilampatti	P.K. Mookiah Thevar	AIFB	49,292	74.46	S. Andi Thevar	IND	16,909	25.54	32,383
Madurai	135	Nilakottai	A. Muniyandi	DMK	38,583	61.12	A. S. Ponnammal	INC	24,540	38.88	14,043
Madurai	136	Sholavandan	P. S. Maniyan	DMK	43,254	55.23	Sundarajan Servai R.	INC	34,542	44.11	8,712
Madurai	137	Thiruparankundram	Kaverimaniam C.	DMK	39,110	50.41	Pandythevar I	INC	26,880	34.64	12,230
Madurai	138	Madurai West	K. T. K. Thangamani	CPI	40,899	47.88	Anandam P.	INC	31,753	37.17	9,146
Madurai	139	Madurai Central	K. Thirupathy	DMK	30,905	48.9	Pazha Nedumara	INC	27,695	43.82	3,210
Madurai	140	Madurai East	K. Ramakrishnan K. S.	DMK	27,884	44.13	Muthuram L. K. T.	INC	25,472	40.32	2,412
Madurai	141	Melur (South)	O. P. Raman	DMK	45,090	58.8	C. Karuthanan	INC	28,214	36.79	16,876
Madurai	142	Melur (North)	P. Malaichamy	DMK	37,337	50.09	M. Andi Ambalam	INC	37,210	49.91	127
Madurai	143	Vadamadurai	Nagarajan. K	DMK	35,989	58.75	Rajendran. S	INC	25,270	41.25	10,719
Madurai	144	Dindigul	Sundaram Pillai O. N.	INC	27,775	39.8	Jama Hussain	IND	26,384	37.81	1,391
Madurai	145	Athoor	A. M. T. Nachiappan	DMK	42,195	59.7	Lakshmanan T. P. S.	INC	25,467	36.03	16,728
Madurai	146	Vedasandur	P. Muthusamy	DMK	36,746	54.18	Nanjundarow S.	INC	23,007	33.92	13,739
Tiruchirapalli	147	Aravakurichi	Abdul Jabbar	IUML	34,164	60.1	Kadasamy Gounder S.	SWA	18,859	33.18	15,305
Tiruchirapalli	148	Karur	S. Nallasamy	DMK	45,977	56.55	T. M. Nallaswamy	INC	35,320	43.45	10,657
Tiruchirapalli	149	Thottiyam	S. K. Vadivelu	DMK	39,821	51.45	K. M. Shanmughasundaram	INC	37,577	48.55	2,244
Tiruchirapalli	150	Musiri	P. S. Muthuselvan	DMK	35,091	54.29	A. R. Murugaiah	INC	24,232	37.49	10,859
Tiruchirapalli	151	Uppiliyapuram	T. P. Alagamuthu	DMK	42,861	51.6	R. Periasami	INC	36,054	43.4	6,807
Tiruchirapalli	152	Perambalur	J. S. Raju	DMK	39,043	55.28	K. Periyanan	INC	23,335	33.04	15,708
Tiruchirapalli	153	Varahur	K. Palanivelan	DMK	42,733	58.91	K. C. Periyasamy	INC	26,043	35.9	16,690
Tiruchirapalli	154	Andimadam	S. Sadasiva Padayachi	DMK	39,313	53.05	G. Thiyagarajan	INC	34,790	46.95	4,523
Tiruchirapalli	155	Jayankondam	A. Chinnasamy	DMK	41,627	57.78	S. Ramasamy	INC	29,346	40.73	12,281
Tiruchirapalli	156	Ariyalur	G. Sivaperumal	DMK	48,320	64.18	R. Sambasivam Moopanar	INC	22,740	30.2	25,580
Tiruchirapalli	157	Lalgudi	Muthamil Selvan Vn.	DMK	40,213	54.51	Rengasamy Udayar D.	INC	28,250	38.29	11,963
Tiruchirapalli	158	Srirangam	Jothi Venkatachalam	INC	36,172	51.22	Kamatchiammal R.	DMK	33,239	47.07	2,933
Tiruchirapalli	159	Tiruchirappalli I	V. Krishnamurthy	DMK	38,099	52.65	Lourdusamy Pillai A. S. G.	INC	33,450	46.23	4,649
Tiruchirapalli	160	Tiruchirappalli Ii	Anbil P. Dharmalingam	DMK	40,593	55.74	Subramanian	INC	31,295	42.97	9,298
Tiruchirapalli	161	Thiruverumbur	Kamaichi	DMK	43,233	53.05	Swaminathan V.	INC	38,258	46.95	4,975
Tiruchirapalli	162	Kulithalai	M. Kandaswamy	DMK	44,198	53.68	Srinivasan Reddiar P. E.	INC	38,145	46.32	6,053
Tiruchirapalli	163	Krishnarayapuram	P. Soundarapandiyan	DMK	36,177	55.03	P. M. Thangavelraj	INC	29,020	44.15	7,157
Tiruchirapalli	164	Kadavur	Karuraigiri Muthiah	INC	31,752	51.62	P. Krishnasamy	DMK	29,763	48.38	1,989
Tiruchirapalli	165	Viralimalai	Ilechezhiyan V. S.	DMK	41,813	57.47	Karuppiah Udayar A.	INC	30,274	41.61	11,539
Tiruchirapalli	166	Thirumayam	A. Thiagarajan	DMK	38,630	53.2	Pr. Ramanathan	INC	24,353	33.54	14,277
Tiruchirapalli	167	Alangudi	K. V. Subbiah	DMK	43,279	54.22	T. A. S. Thangavelu	INC	35,397	44.34	7,882
Tiruchirapalli	168	Pudukkottai	M. Sathiamoorthy	INC	34,680	46.8	Subbaiah Kr.	CPI	33,393	45.07	1,287
Thanjavur	169	Thiruvaiyaru	G. Elangovan	DMK	37,139	50.75	Palani K. B.	INC	29,813	40.74	7,326
Thanjavur	170	Thanjavur	S. Natarajan	DMK	38,288	55.72	A. Y. Arokiasamy Nadar	INC	30,423	44.28	7,865
Thanjavur	171	Papanasam	N. Ganapathy	DMK	43,497	56.21	V. Ramakrishnan	INC	33,884	43.79	9,613
Thanjavur	172	Valangiman	N. Somasundaram	DMK	38,519	58.11	V. Thangavelu	INC	24,351	36.73	14,168
Thanjavur	173	Kumbakonam	N. Kasiraman	INC	39,755	51.45	S. Padmananbhan	DMK	37,136	48.06	2,619
Thanjavur	174	Aduthurai	K. Rajamanickam	DMK	40,023	51.26	A. Marimuthu	INC	38,060	48.74	1,963
Thanjavur	175	Sirkazhi	Vadivel S.	CPI	31,977	53.25	K. B. S. Mani	INC	25,667	42.74	6,310
Thanjavur	176	Sembanarkoil	Sampath T. V.	DMK	33,937	56.28	Sambandam K. R.	INC	19,447	32.25	14,490
Thanjavur	177	Mayiladuthurai	N. Kittappa	DMK	37,311	50.69	M. R. Krishnappa	INC	36,292	49.31	1,019
Thanjavur	178	Kuttalam	S. Ganesan	DMK	34,781	54.57	K. K. Deen	INC	22,554	35.39	12,227
Thanjavur	179	Kudavasal	Periasamy Udayar K.	DMK	31,302	47.75	Daksinamoorthy Kalingaraya	INC	23,576	35.97	7,726
Thanjavur	180	Nannilam	Devandiran A	DMK	36,740	59.42	V. S. Arunachalam	INC	21,432	34.66	15,308
Thanjavur	181	Thiruvarur	M. Karunanithi Thazhai	DMK	30,828	47.46	Vedaiyan. V	INC	18,686	28.77	12,142
Thanjavur	182	Nagapattinam	Rajamanickam	DMK	29,744	44.8	Ramanatha Thevar	INC	23,342	35.16	6,402
Thanjavur	183	Vedaranyam	M. Meenakshi Sundaram	DMK	41,787	63.86	Velayuthan P. C.	INC	17,478	26.71	24,309
Thanjavur	184	Thiruthuraipoondi	Manali Kandasami C.	CPI	40,714	62.84	Thayamanavang G.	INC	22,118	34.14	18,596
Thanjavur	185	Kottur	Subbiah A. K.	CPI	47,419	73.26	Rajamanickam T.	INC	17,309	26.74	30,110
Thanjavur	186	Mannargudi	Balakrishnan K.	DMK	35,211	52.05	T. S. Swaminatha Odayar	INC	28,083	41.51	7,128
Thanjavur	187	Orathanadu	L. Ganesan	DMK	49,269	61.99	Dhadayaudhapani	INC	26,283	33.07	22,986
Thanjavur	188	Gandharvakottai	Govindarasu Kalingarar	DMK	42,025	57.59	Ramachandra Durai R.	INC	28,239	38.7	13,786
Thanjavur	189	Pattukkottai	A. R. Marimuthu	PSP	44,565	62.95	Nagarajan N.	INC	26,229	37.05	18,336
Thanjavur	190	Peravurani	Chelliah	IND	32,025	36.46	M. Krishnamoorthy	DMK	30,005	34.16	2,020
Thanjavur	191	Aranthangi	S. Ramanathan	DMK	49,322	55.81	Ramanathan Servaikarar	INC	37,289	42.19	12,033
Ramanathapuram	192	Tiruppattur (Sivaganga)	S. Madhavan	DMK	54,117	70.13	S. Sethuramalingam	INC	23,047	29.87	31,070
Ramanathapuram	193	Karaikudi	C. T. Chidambaram	DMK	39,986	59.82	S. P. R. Ramaswamy	SWA	26,858	40.18	13,128
Ramanathapuram	194	Tiruvadanai	Pr. Shanmugham	DMK	40,417	54.32	K. R. Kariamanickam Ambalam	SWA	33,457	44.97	6,960
Ramanathapuram	195	Ilayangudi	Malaikannan V.	DMK	45,551	61.99	Ramakrishna Thevar S.	INC	24,138	32.85	21,413
Ramanathapuram	196	Ramanathapuram	M. S. K. Sathyendran	DMK	40,690	65.05	Balagangadharan R.	INC	19,649	31.41	21,041
Ramanathapuram	197	Kadaladi	C. Ramalingam	DMK	31,521	64.86	Alangaram M.	SWA	13,863	28.53	17,658
Ramanathapuram	198	Mudukulathur	Kadher Batcha Alias Vellaichind	IND	18,267	32.86	Subramoniam R. C.	INC	17,532	31.54	735
Ramanathapuram	199	Paramakudi	T. K. Siraimeettan	DMK	42,614	58.97	Rakkan K. V.	INC	24,864	34.41	17,750
Ramanathapuram	200	Sivaganga	S. Sethuraman	DMK	42,320	60.19	O. Subramanian	INC	24,654	35.06	17,666
Ramanathapuram	201	Manamadurai	T. Soniah	DMK	42,584	56.79	S. Sankaralingam	INC	32,405	43.21	10,179
Ramanathapuram	202	Kariapatti	Perumal A. R.	AIFB	31,499	51.33	Muthuvel Serval M.	INC	22,175	36.14	9,324
Ramanathapuram	203	Aruppukottai	Sowdi Sundara Bharathi	AIFB	37,021	56.67	Veerasamy M.	SWA	27,908	42.72	9,113
Ramanathapuram	204	Virudhunagar	P. Seenivasan	DMK	31,455	49.88	V. Seenivasaga Naidu	SWA	29,878	47.38	1,577
Ramanathapuram	205	Sattur	S. Alagu Thevar	AIFB	32,610	55.43	Dorairaj Naicker R	SWA	24,216	41.16	8,394
Ramanathapuram	206	Sivakasi	K. Kalimuthu	DMK	39,854	59.42	Sundararaj Naicker N.	SWA	25,486	38	14,368
Ramanathapuram	207	Srivilliputhur	K. Gurusamy Alias Andi	DMK	41,522	63.34	Dharmaraj S. P.	INC	24,036	36.66	17,486
Ramanathapuram	208	Rajapalayam	K. Suppu	CPI	36,827	50.45	Srirenga Raja K. R.	INC	36,163	49.55	664
Tirunelveli	209	Vilathikulam	M. Rathnasabapathy	DMK	32,583	57.33	Subba Reddiar K.	INC	22,097	38.88	10,486
Tirunelveli	210	Kovilpatti	S. Alagarsamy	CPI	38,844	62.16	Subba Naicker L.	INC	23,646	37.84	15,198
Tirunelveli	211	Ottapidaram	M. Muthiah	AIFB	27,571	56.92	K. Manoharan	SWA	17,861	36.87	9,710
Tirunelveli	212	Sankarankoil	S. Subbiah	DMK	35,677	61.84	Jame M.	INC	22,019	38.16	13,658
Tirunelveli	213	Vasudevanallur	A. Velladurai	DMK	35,954	56.96	Gopa Thevar A.	INC	27,169	43.04	8,785
Tirunelveli	214	Kadayanallur	A. R. Subbiah Mudaliar	DMK	37,649	52.49	Abdul Majid Sahib S. M.	INC	34,079	47.51	3,570
Tirunelveli	215	Tenkasi	Samsudeen Alias Kathiravan	DMK	39,110	55.66	Iswar An I. C.	INC	31,150	44.34	7,960
Tirunelveli	216	Alangulam	Aladi Aruna	DMK	36,526	51.29	Ramachandran S. K. T.	INC	34,688	48.71	1,838
Tirunelveli	217	Ambasamudram	S. Sanmugamuthu Thevar	INC	31,192	46.52	Ananthakrishnan R. V.	DMK	27,707	41.32	3,485
Tirunelveli	218	Cheranmahadevi	D. S. A. Sivaprakasam	SWA	34,739	50.14	Ratnavelpandian S.	DMK	34,546	49.86	193
Tirunelveli	219	Gangaikondan	A. Karuppiah	DMK	32,963	58.83	Koil Pillai S.	INC	18,207	32.49	14,756
Tirunelveli	220	Tirunelveli	P. Padmanabhan	DMK	43,325	62.16	Rajathi Kunchithapatham	INC	26,373	37.84	16,952
Tirunelveli	221	Melapalayam	M. Kather Mohideen S.	IUML	35,470	56.73	Shanmugavel C.	INC	21,785	34.85	13,685
Tirunelveli	222	Srivaikuntam	S. P. Adithanar	DMK	37,329	54.95	Annamalai R. A. R.	INC	27,724	40.81	9,605
Tirunelveli	223	Thoothukkudi	Ramalingam R.	DMK	39,030	56.98	Naorojiammal	INC	29,473	43.02	9,557
Tirunelveli	224	Tiruchendur	Edmund	DMK	39,974	53.54	Ganesasundaram	INC	34,045	45.6	5,929
Tirunelveli	225	Sattangulam	K. P. Kandasasmy	DMK	33,510	51.72	T. Martin	INC	28,592	44.13	4,918
Tirunelveli	226	Nanguneri	T. Ganapathy	DMK	33,099	53.42	Thavasikani S. T.	INC	28,863	46.58	4,236
Tirunelveli	227	Radhapuram	V. Karthesan	DMK	33,678	51.68	Karuthiah K. P.	INC	31,489	48.32	2,189
Kanyakumari	228	Kanniyakumari	K. Rajah Pillai	DMK	35,884	51.1	Mahadevan Pillai B.	INC	31,326	44.61	4,558
Kanyakumari	229	Nagercoil	M. Moses	SWA	34,726	48.09	Christopher G.	DMK	34,185	47.34	541
Kanyakumari	230	Colachel	A. Pauliah	INC	37,401	54.98	S. Retnaraj	DMK	29,852	43.88	7,549
Kanyakumari	231	Padmanabhapuram	A. Swamidhas	INC	32,416	56.05	Michael G. C.	DMK	17,174	29.7	15,242
Kanyakumari	232	Tiruvattar	J. James	INC	36,097	59.66	J. Hemachandran	CPI(M)	14,315	23.66	21,782
Kanyakumari	233	Vilavancode	R. Ponnappan Nadar	INC	32,139	61.79	Gnanaraj Christopher G.	DMK	11,170	21.48	20,969
Kanyakumari	234	Killiyoor	N. Dennis	INC	34,573	62.25	Russel Raj. C	DMK	20,541	36.99	14,032

== Second Karunanidhi Ministry ==
Minister	Portfolios
M. Karunanidhi	Chief Minister, Finance, Home and police, Legislature
V. R. Nedunchezhiyan	Education and Revenue
K. Rajaram	Backward Classes
K. Anbazhagan	Public Health
Anbil P. Dharmalingam	Agriculture
S. J. Sadiq Pasha	Public Works
Satyavani Muthu	Harijan Welfare
M. Kannappan	Religious Endowments
S. Madhavan	Industries
N. V. Natarajan	Labour
O. P. Raman	Electricity
S. P. Adithanar	Cooperation
S. Ramachandran	Transport

== See also ==
- Elections in Tamil Nadu
- Legislature of Tamil Nadu
- Government of Tamil Nadu
