= Kaniyambadi Assembly constituency =

Coordinates: 12.81°N 79.14°E

Kaniyambadi
- Former constituency for the Tamil Nadu Legislative Assembly

Constituency details
- Country: India
- Region: South India
- State: Tamil Nadu
- District: Vellore
- Established: 1967
- Abolished: 1976
- Total electors: 86,907
- Reservation: None

Kaniyambadi was former constituency in the Tamil Nadu Legislative Assembly of Tamil Nadu, a southern state of India. It was in Vellore district.

== Members of the Legislative Assembly ==
Year	Winner	Party
1971	Thopputhiruvengadam	Dravida Munnetra Kazhagam
1967	L. Balaraman	Indian National Congress

== Election results ==
Vote share of winning candidates
1971	54.11%
1967	49.62%

=== 1971 ===
1971 Tamil Nadu Legislative Assembly election: Kaniyambadi
Party	Candidate	Votes	%	±%
DMK	Thopputhiruvengadam	34,435	54.11%	6.87%
INC	L. Balaraman	24,647	38.73%	−10.89%
Independent	R. Shanmugam	3,084	4.85%	
Independent	C. Rathinam	1,182	1.86%	
Independent	Jayarama Gounder	292	0.46%	
Margin of victory		9,788	15.38%	13.01%
Turnout		63,640	76.58%	−1.06%
Registered electors		86,907		
DMK gain from INC		Swing	4.49%	

=== 1967 ===
1967 Madras Legislative Assembly election: Kaniyambadi
Party	Candidate	Votes	%	±%
INC	L. Balaraman	29,512	49.62%	
DMK	T. Thiruvengadam	28,100	47.24%	
RPI	K. Mayakrishnan	1,867	3.14%	
Margin of victory		1,412	2.37%	
Turnout		59,479	77.64%	
Registered electors		80,337		
INC win (new seat)				
