= Sembanarkoil Assembly constituency =

Coordinates: 11.11°N 79.74°E

Sembanarkoil
- Former constituency for the Tamil Nadu Legislative Assembly

Constituency details
- Country: India
- Region: South India
- State: Tamil Nadu
- District: Mayiladuthurai
- Established: 1967
- Abolished: 1971
- Total electors: 81,142
- Reservation: None

Sembanarkoil is a state assembly constituency in Mayiladuthurai district, Tamil Nadu, India. It existed from 1967 to 1971.

== Members of the Legislative Assembly ==
Year	Winner	Party
Madras State
1971	Sampath T. V.	Dravida Munnetra Kazhagam
1967	S. Ganesan	Dravida Munnetra Kazhagam

== Election results ==
Vote share of winning candidates
1971	56.28%
1967	65.29%

=== 1971 ===
1971 Tamil Nadu Legislative Assembly election: Sembanarkoil
Party	Candidate	Votes	%	±%
DMK	Sampath T. V.	33,937	56.28%	−9.01%
INC	Sambandam K. R.	19,447	32.25%	−2.46%
CPI(M)	Muthusamy V. K.	6,914	11.47%	
Margin of victory		14,490	24.03%	−6.55%
Turnout		60,298	77.51%	−5.86%
Registered electors		81,142		
DMK hold		Swing	-9.01%	

=== 1967 ===
1967 Madras Legislative Assembly election: Sembanarkoil
Party	Candidate	Votes	%	±%
DMK	S. Ganesan	40,453	65.29%	
INC	S. Ramalingam	21,506	34.71%	
Margin of victory		18,947	30.58%	
Turnout		61,959	83.37%	
Registered electors		76,750		
DMK win (new seat)				
