= Melur South Assembly constituency =

Coordinates: 10.027°N 78.335°E

Melur (South)
- Former constituency for the Tamil Nadu Legislative Assembly

Constituency details
- Country: India
- Region: South India
- State: Tamil Nadu
- District: Madurai
- Established: 1967
- Abolished: 1971
- Total electors: 1,09,718

Melur South is a state assembly constituency in Madurai district, Tamil Nadu, India. It existed from 1967 to 1971.

== Members of the Legislative Assembly ==
Year	Winner	Party
1971	O. P. Raman	Dravida Munnetra Kazhagam
1967	O. P. Raman	Dravida Munnetra Kazhagam

== Election results ==
Vote share of winning candidates
1971	58.80%
1967	63.41%

=== 1971 ===
1971 Tamil Nadu Legislative Assembly election: Melur (South)
Party	Candidate	Votes	%	±%
DMK	O. P. Raman	45,090	58.80%	−4.61%
INC	C. Karuthanan	28,214	36.79%	0.20%
Independent	P. Poosari	2,574	3.36%	
Independent	M. Gandhi Veeran	807	1.05%	
Margin of victory		16,876	22.01%	−4.82%
Turnout		76,685	75.80%	−8.16%
Registered electors		1,09,718		
DMK hold		Swing	-4.61%	

=== 1967 ===
1967 Madras Legislative Assembly election: Melur (South)
Party	Candidate	Votes	%	±%
DMK	O. P. Raman	50,913	63.41%	
INC	P. Kakkan	29,376	36.59%	
Margin of victory		21,537	26.82%	
Turnout		80,289	83.96%	
Registered electors		98,125		
DMK win (new seat)				
