= 1967 Madras State Legislative Assembly election =

Election on 5–21 February 1967

1967 Madras Legislative Assembly election
- 5–21 February 1967

All 234 seats in the Tamil Nadu Legislative Assembly 118 seats needed for a majority
- Turnout: 76.57% (▲5.92%)
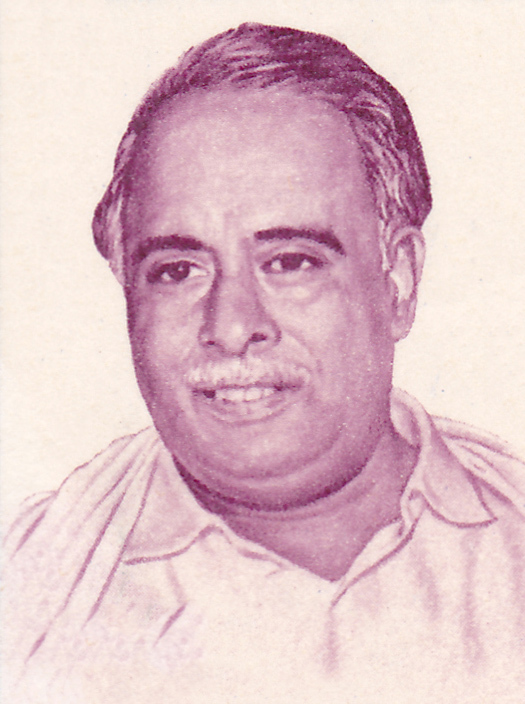

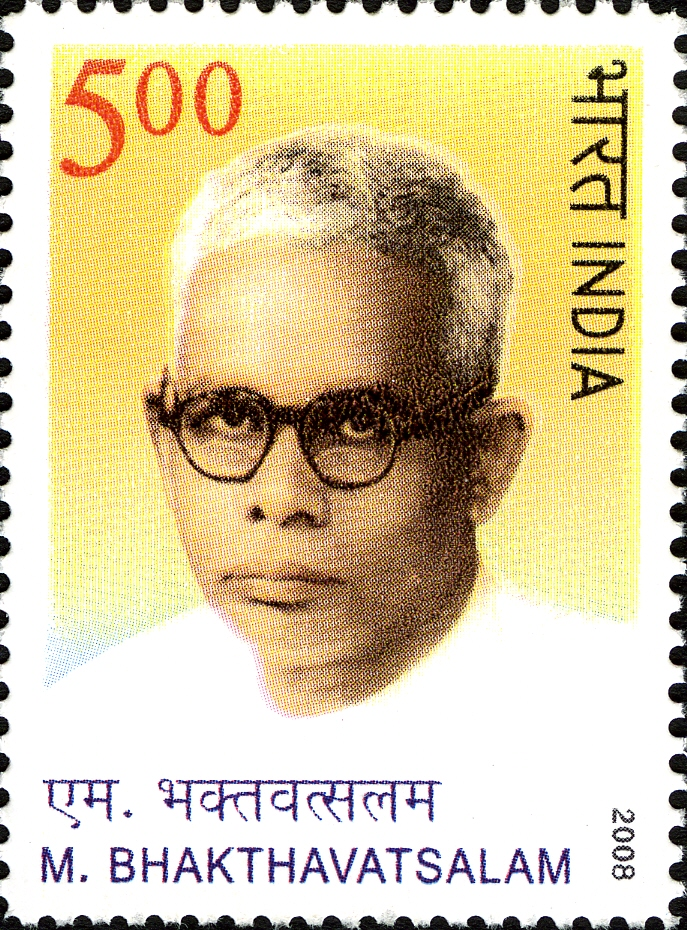
	First party	Second party
Leader	C. N. Annadurai	M. Bhaktavatsalam
Party	DMK	INC
Leader's seat	Did Not Contest (Note: He was contested and won for MP for South Chennai, later resigned it to become MLC)	Sriperumbudur (lost)
Seats won	137	51
Seat change	▲87	▼84
Popular vote	6,230,552	6,293,378
Percentage	40.69%	41.10%
Swing	▲13.59%	▼5.04%
Alliance seats	179	51
Alliance seat change	▲121	▼84
Alliance popular vote	80,51,433	62,93,378
Alliance percentage	52.59%	41.10%
Chief Minister before election
M. Bakthavatsalam
INC
Elected Chief Minister
C. N. Annadurai
DMK

The fourth legislative assembly election of Madras State (later renamed as Tamil Nadu) was held in February 1967. The Dravida Munnetra Kazhagam (DMK) led coalition under the leadership of C.N. Annadurai won the election defeating the Indian National Congress.

== Background ==
The Congress party began to show weakness in the years after the 1962 election. In the summer of 1962, DMK conducted demonstrations against rising prices. These demonstrations turned violent throughout the state leading to the arrest of 6500 DMK volunteers, 14 members of the assembly and four members of the Lok Sabha, including Annadurai.

K. Kamaraj voluntarily resigned the Chief Ministership in 1963, despite being popular, to assume the presidency of the All India Congress Committee and was replaced by M. Bakthavatsalam. Kamaraj had hoped to serve as role model to other senior Congress leaders to pave way for youngsters and strengthen the party's popularity. Robert L. Hardgrave Jr. (Temple Professor Emeritus in the Humanities, Government and Asian Studies from the University of Texas) wrote in an article published in the journal Pacific Affairs, that M. Bhaktavatsalam did not have the personal charisma or political acumen of Kamaraj. Persistent rumours of corruption tarnished the image of the Government. In October 1964, the food crisis brought the popularity of the Congress Government to an all-time low.

== Issues ==
The major issues at play in the election were the official language issue, the rise in essential commodity prices and the shortage of rice. The central Government led by the Indian National Congress had implemented an act replacing English with Hindi as an official language of India while retaining a possible "associate" status to English. The switchover came into effect on 26 January 1965. In protest to the vague wording of the act, fearing a possible elimination of English and imposition of Hindi, DMK had launched an agitation opposing the switchover and that agitation turned violent. The 1967 election was held in the aftermath of this violence.

The acute rice shortage prevailing in the state became an election issue with the DMK promising to supply three padis (approx. 4.5 kg) of rice for 1 Rupee in its election manifesto. The DMK capitalised on the rice shortage as well as widespread discontent with the Bhaktavatsalam administration. Slogans like Kamarajar Annachi kadalaiparuppu vilai ennachu (Elder Brother (Annachi is a title historically been used to refer to a person of Kamaraj's caste) Kamaraj, what happened to the price of chana dal?), Bhaktavatsalam annachi, arisi vilai ennachu (lit. Brother Bhatavatsalam, what happened to the price of rice?) were used effectively by the DMK to stir public anger against the Congress.

This election was noted for popular actor, DMK candidate and future Chief Minister M.G. Ramachandran (MGR) being shot in the throat by actor M.R. Radha mere weeks before the polls. He survived the shooting, but the incident created a huge popularity wave for MGR. This eventually helped to increase the popularity of not only MGR, but also the DMK in the election, and is attributed as one of the reasons for the victory of the DMK.

According to journalist Tharasu Shyam, a college student at the time recalled that during the 1967 Assembly elections, the then-ruling Congress party distributed ₹10 to voters as part of its electoral practices.

== Coalitions ==
There were two major political coalitions running in the elections. The Indian National Congress contested alone, while the Dravidar Kazhagam (DK) under Periyar E. V. Ramasamy supported and campaigned for the incumbent Congress against his protege Annadurai. The DMK-led front comprised the Swatantra Party, Communist Party of India (Marxist), Praja Socialist Party, Samyukta Socialist Party, Tamil Nadu Toilers Party, Republican Party of India and the Indian Union Muslim League. The Tamil Arasu Kazhagam and the We Tamils party campaigned using the DMK election symbol. This opposition coalition was forged by C. Rajagopalachari (Rajaji) with the sole purpose of defeating the Kamaraj led Congress. Rajaji's personal hostility to Kamaraj and his opposition to the Congress party were the main reasons behind Swatantra's alliance with DMK. The Communist Party of India campaigned alone without joining either of the two coalitions.

The electoral alliance between DMK, Swatantra Party and Muslim League had emerged in the years before the 1964 civic elections throughout Madras state. During the 1964 election campaign Rajagopalachari had said, "The DMK and Muslim League are my children and I am duty bound to nurse them to strength and stature."

== Campaigning ==
Both Congress and DMK used films and actors for campaigning. Gemini Studios produced a political film for the Congress – Vazhga Nam Thayagam starring Shivaji Ganesan and Nagesh. Sivaji and Padmini worked for the Congress party. Despite its efforts, Congress could not counter the DMK's propaganda, which had a long history of using films for political campaigns since its founding.

DMK's long-term association with the Tamil Film industry was put to good use in the campaign. MGR's films were used to attack Congress policies and to popularise DMK's positions. Similar to the tactics employed in the elections of 1957 and 1962, film songs and dialogues from Kaanji Thalaivan (1963), "Deivathai (1964), "Padakotti (1964)", Aayirathil Oruvan", Enga Veettu Pillai (1965), Anbe Vaa (1966), Naan Aanaiyittal (1966), "Mugarasi (1966)", "Petralthan Pillaya (1966)",Vivasayee (1967) and Arasakattalai (1967) were used for political messaging. Lesser known film stars like Ravichandran and Jaishankar used their films for praising DMK and Annadurai. The DMK put up posters of MGR recuperating in a hospital bed with a neck cast (from his gunshot wounds) all over Tamil Nadu to garner public sympathy and support.

== Election ==
The election was held for a total of 234 constituencies, including 43 Scheduled Caste and 2 Scheduled Tribe reserved constituencies. 778 candidates, including 11 women were in the fray, of whom 231 men and 3 women were elected to the assembly. The election saw a turnout of 76.57 percent of all eligible voters, with 79.19% men and 73.99% women casting their votes. The polling for the assembly election took place along with the polling for the 1967 parliamentary elections. It took place in three phases between 5 and 21 February (5, 18 and 21 February).

== Seat Allotment ==
=== DMK Front ===
DMK Front
Party	Flag	Symbol	Leader	Seats	
Dravida Munnetra Kazhagam			C. N. Annadurai	168	174
Naam Tamilar Katchi			S. P. Adithanar	4	174
Tamil Arasu Kazhagam			M. P. Sivagnanam	2	174
Swatantra Party			C. Rajagopalachari	27	
Communist Party of India (Marxist)			M. R. Venkataraman	22	
Praja Socialist Party				4	
Indian Union Muslim League (Note: Scales Symbol was Independent Symbol throughout India, except Punjab in 1967 elections.)			Muhammed Ismail	3	
Samyukta Socialist Party			George Fernandes	3	
All India Forward Bloc			P. K. Mookiah Thevar	1	
Independent			K. B. S. Mani; A. R. Subbiah Mudaliar	2	
Total				234	

=== Congress ===
Indian National Congress
Party	Flag	Symbol	Leader	Seats
Indian National Congress			K. Kamaraj	233
Independent				1
Total				234

== Results ==
DMK and its coalition allies won 179 seats (76.5%). The Indian National Congress won 51 seats (21.8%). Four candidates of the Naam Thamizhar Party led by S. P. Adithanar and two candidates of Tamil Arasu Kazhagam led by M. P. Sivagnanam contested under DMK's "Rising Sun" Symbol. The Indian Union Muslim League candidates contested as independents.

Alliances	Party	Popular Vote	Vote %	Seats contested	Seats won	Change
United Front Seats: 179; Seat Change: ▲121; Popular Vote: 8,051,433; Popular Vote %: 52.59%	Dravida Munnetra Kazhagam	6,230,552	40.69%	174	137	▲87
United Front Seats: 179; Seat Change: ▲121; Popular Vote: 8,051,433; Popular Vote %: 52.59%	Swatantra Party	811,232	5.30%	27	20	▲12
United Front Seats: 179; Seat Change: ▲121; Popular Vote: 8,051,433; Popular Vote %: 52.59%	CPI(M)	623,114	4.07%	22	11	▲11
United Front Seats: 179; Seat Change: ▲121; Popular Vote: 8,051,433; Popular Vote %: 52.59%	Praja Socialist Party	136,188	0.89%	4	4	▲4
United Front Seats: 179; Seat Change: ▲121; Popular Vote: 8,051,433; Popular Vote %: 52.59%	Indian Union Muslim League	95,494	0.62%	3	3	▲3
United Front Seats: 179; Seat Change: ▲121; Popular Vote: 8,051,433; Popular Vote %: 52.59%	Samyukta Socialist Party	84,188	0.55%	3	2	▲2
United Front Seats: 179; Seat Change: ▲121; Popular Vote: 8,051,433; Popular Vote %: 52.59%	DMK Backed Independents	70,665	0.46%	2	2	▲2
Indian National Congress; Seats: 51; Seat Change: ▼84; Popular Vote: 6,293,378; Popular Vote %: 41.10%	Indian National Congress	6,293,378	41.10%	232	51	▼84
Others; Seats: 4 Seat Change: ▼4	Independent	591,214	3.86%	246	1	▼4
Others; Seats: 4 Seat Change: ▼4	Communist Party of India	275,932	1.80%	32	2	Steady
Others; Seats: 4 Seat Change: ▼4	Forward Bloc	44,714	0.29%	1	1	Steady
Others; Seats: 4 Seat Change: ▼4	Republican Party of India	31,286	0.20%	13	0	Steady
Others; Seats: 4 Seat Change: ▼4	Bharatiya Jana Sangh	22,745	0.15%	24	0	Steady
Total	11 Political Parties	15,310,702	100%	—	234	▲28

=== Results by district ===
District	Seats			
District	Seats	DMK+	INC+	OTH
Chengalpattu	15	14	1	0
Madras	12	12	0	0
North Arcot	22	17	5	0
South Arcot	21	15	6	0
Dharmapuri	9	3	6	0
Salem	17	16	1	0
Coimbatore	25	22	3	0
Nilgiris	3	2	1	0
Tiruchirapalli	22	16	6	0
Thanjavur	23	14	8	1
Madurai	22	18	3	1
Ramanathapuram	17	16	0	1
Tirunelveli	19	13	5	1
Kanyakumari	7	1	6	0
Total	234	179	51	4

=== By Region ===
Alliance-wise Results
Region	Total Seats	DMK-led Alliance	Indian National Congress
Northern Madras	70	58 / 70 (83%)	12 / 70 (17%)
Western Madras	54	43 / 54 (80%)	11 / 54 (20%)
Southern Madras	65	48 / 65 (74%)	14 / 65 (22%)
Central Madras	45	30 / 45 (67%)	14 / 45 (31%)

=== By constituency ===
**	Muslim League Candidates contesting as independents
*	DMK backed Independents

Winner, runner-up, voter turnout, and victory margin in every constituency
District	Assembly Constituency		Winner				Runner Up				Margin
District	#k	Name	Candidate	Party	Votes	%	Candidate	Party	Votes	%	Margin
Madras	1	Washermanpet	M. Vedachalam	DMK	34,571	50.7	M. Mayandi Nadar	INC	27,329	40.08	7,242
Madras	2	Harbour	H. Baig	Independent	29,360	51.69	K. S. G. Haja Shareef	INC	25,510	44.91	3,850
Madras	3	Basin Bridge	M. R. Kannan	DMK	40,109	53.81	K. Ramdas	INC	30,757	41.26	9,352
Madras	4	Park Town	H. V. Hande	SWA	29,144	51.57	T. N. Anandanayaki	INC	26,465	46.83	2,679
Madras	5	Perambur	Sathyavani Muthu	DMK	40,364	54.19	D. Sulochana	INC	33,677	45.21	6,687
Madras	6	Purasawalkam	V. S. Govindarajan	DMK	41,272	58.04	Damodaran	INC	29,046	40.85	12,226
Madras	7	Egmore	A. V. P. Asaithambi	DMK	36,133	54.2	J. Vencatachellum	INC	29,187	43.78	6,946
Madras	8	Thousand Lights	K. A. Mathiazhagan	DMK	39,518	60.27	M. Sivaraj	INC	25,370	38.69	14,148
Madras	9	Triplicane	V. R. Nedunchezhiyan	DMK	38,721	59.41	M. S. Sammandappa	INC	26,027	39.93	12,694
Madras	10	Mylapore	Arangannal	DMK	37,498	57.02	V. R. Radhakrishnan	INC	28,270	42.98	9,228
Madras	11	Thiyagaraya Nagar	M. P. Sivagnanam	DMK	37,662	57.36	K. M. Subramaniam	Independent	27,669	42.14	9,993
Madras	12	Saidapet	M. Karunanidhi	DMK	53,401	60.96	S. G. Vinayagamurthi	INC	32,919	37.58	20,482
Chengalpattu	13	Gummidipoondi	K. Vezhavendan	DMK	35,887	52.57	Kamalambujammal	INC	31,527	46.19	4,360
Chengalpattu	14	Ponneri	P. Nagalingam	DMK	37,746	56.61	T. P. Elumalai	INC	27,751	41.62	9,995
Chengalpattu	15	Thiruvottiyur	A. P. Arasu	DMK	51,437	61.23	V. Venkateswaralu	INC	32,564	38.77	18,873
Chengalpattu	16	St Thomas Mount	M. G. Ramachandran	DMK	54,106	66.67	T. L. Raghupathy	INC	26,432	32.57	27,674
Chengalpattu	17	Thiruporur	M. Adhi	DMK	39,047	60.03	N. M. Manivarama	INC	22,631	34.79	16,416
Chengalpattu	18	Chengalpattu	C. G. Viswanathan	DMK	43,428	62.77	T. Naicker	INC	19,879	28.73	23,549
Chengalpattu	19	Maduranthakam	Kothandam	DMK	38,382	59.2	G. Reddy	INC	25,200	38.87	13,182
Chengalpattu	20	Acharapakkam	P. S. Ellappan	SWA	38,223	62.11	P. Saradambal	INC	23,322	37.89	14,901
Chengalpattu	21	Uthiramerur	K. M. Rajagopal	DMK	47,689	64.01	O. S. Reddiar	INC	26,814	35.99	20,875
Chengalpattu	22	Kancheepuram	N. Krishnan	DMK	45,266	56.78	V. C. S. Nayagar	INC	33,716	42.3	11,550
Chengalpattu	23	Kunnathur	M. Gopal	DMK	47,772	68.88	P. Appavoo	INC	20,563	29.65	27,209
Chengalpattu	24	Sriperumbudur	D. Rajarathinam	DMK	41,655	54.13	M. Bhaktavatsalam	INC	32,729	42.53	8,926
Chengalpattu	25	Kadambathur	C. V. M. Annamalai	DMK	43,499	66.68	C. C. Naidu	INC	21,741	33.32	21,758
Chengalpattu	26	Thiruvallur	S. M. Dorairaj	DMK	40,687	66.06	V. S. Arunachalam	INC	19,030	30.9	21,657
Chengalpattu	27	Tiruttani	K. Vinayakam	INC	27,123	40.34	V. K. Kuppuswamy	DMK	25,337	37.68	1,786
North Arcot	28	Arakkonam	S. J. Ramaswamy Mudali	DMK	38,478	52.78	B. Naidu	INC	30,870	42.35	7,608
North Arcot	29	Sholingur	Aranganathan	DMK	35,225	51.67	A. M. Ponnuranga Mudaliar	INC	28,201	41.37	7,024
North Arcot	30	Ranipet	A. G. Sahib	Independent	30,011	45.14	S. K. Sheriff	INC	28,953	43.55	1,058
North Arcot	31	Arcot	Arcot N. Veeraswami	DMK	37,514	60.13	A. G. R. Naicker	INC	23,184	37.16	14,330
North Arcot	32	Katpadi	G. Natarajan	DMK	32,952	53.06	P. S. R. Naidu	INC	25,032	40.3	7,920
North Arcot	33	Gudiyatham	V. K. Kothandaraman	CPI(M)	38,825	61.21	B. R. Naidu	INC	21,901	34.53	16,924
North Arcot	34	Pernambattu	P. Jayaraman	DMK	28,868	54.75	T. Manavalan	INC	19,957	37.85	8,911
North Arcot	35	Natrampalli	T. C. T. Gounder	DMK	29,215	52.18	R. C. S. Gounder	INC	26,776	47.82	2,439
North Arcot	36	Tirupattur (Vellore)	C. Gounder	DMK	32,589	49.8	Shunmugam	INC	30,512	46.62	2,077
North Arcot	37	Vaniyambadi	Rajamannar	INC	26,946	50.77	Vadivel	DMK	25,308	47.69	1,638
North Arcot	38	Ambur	M. Panneerselvam	DMK	31,554	56.35	P. Rajagopal	INC	20,947	37.41	10,607
North Arcot	39	Kaniyambadi	L. Balaraman	INC	29,512	49.62	T. Thiruvengadam	DMK	28,100	47.24	1,412
North Arcot	40	Vellore	M. P. Sarathy	DMK	39,863	58.96	J. Mudaliar	INC	25,449	37.64	14,414
North Arcot	41	Arani	A. C. Narasimhan	DMK	38,038	60.74	T. B. J. Chettiar	INC	17,320	27.66	20,718
North Arcot	42	Cheyyar	K. Govindan	DMK	37,068	54.86	K. M. Kangan	INC	17,395	25.74	19,673
North Arcot	43	Vandavasi	Muthulingam	DMK	38,626	61.25	A. Adineelam	INC	21,300	33.78	17,326
North Arcot	44	Pernamallur	V. D. A. Mudaly	DMK	29,413	46.25	P. Ramachandran	INC	20,225	31.8	9,188
North Arcot	45	Polur	S. Kuppamal	DMK	33,292	56.92	S. M. Annamalai	INC	20,224	34.58	13,068
North Arcot	46	Chengam	P. S. Santhanam	DMK	29,828	56.84	A. Arumugham	INC	18,773	35.77	11,055
North Arcot	47	Thandarambattu	K. S. Kandar	INC	29,524	50.31	R. Dharmalingam	DMK	28,185	48.03	1,339
North Arcot	48	Kalasapakkam	S. Murugaiyan	INC	32,697	51.37	M. Sundarasan	DMK	20,554	32.3	12,143
North Arcot	49	Tiruvannamalai	D. Vijayaraj	INC	38,153	49.39	P. U. Shanmugam	DMK	34,968	45.26	3,185
South Arcot	50	Melmalayanur	R. R. Munusamy	DMK	33,115	50.68	K. G. Gounder	INC	17,295	26.47	15,820
South Arcot	51	Gingee	V. Munusami	DMK	39,517	55.59	G. Rajaram	INC	27,905	39.26	11,612
South Arcot	52	Tindivanam	K. Ramamoorthy	INC	34,106	51.59	A. Thangavelu	DMK	32,008	48.41	2,098
South Arcot	53	Vanur	Balakrishnan	DMK	30,023	50.06	Velayudham	INC	29,953	49.94	70
South Arcot	54	Kandamangalam	M. Raman	DMK	35,617	55.83	M. S. Saraswathi	INC	28,180	44.17	7,437
South Arcot	55	Villupuram	M. Shanmugam	DMK	37,605	53.73	V. P. S. Gounder	INC	31,674	45.26	5,931
South Arcot	56	Nellikuppam	C. Govindarajan	CPI(M)	28,090	47.24	A. Lakshminarayanan	INC	23,117	38.88	4,973
South Arcot	57	Cuddalore	Ere. Elamvazhuthi	DMK	35,093	55.09	P. R. Seenivasa Padayachi	INC	27,845	43.71	7,248
South Arcot	58	Panruti	S. Ramachandaran	DMK	43,745	60.82	S. V. Vadivelu Padayachi	INC	28,179	39.18	15,566
South Arcot	59	Kurinjipadi	N. Rajangam	DMK	25,478	54.5	M. Jayaraman	INC	18,226	38.99	7,252
South Arcot	60	Bhuvanagiri	A. Govindarasan	DMK	38,795	56.28	D. Ramachandran	INC	28,234	40.96	10,561
South Arcot	61	Kattumannarkoil	S. Sivasubramanian	INC	30,521	48.34	C. Govindarasu	DMK	30,387	48.13	134
South Arcot	62	Chidambaram	R. Kanagasabai Pillai	INC	34,911	49.18	P. Ponchockalingam	DMK	33,356	46.99	1,555
South Arcot	63	Vriddhachalam	G. Boovaraghan	INC	42,230	54.77	M. Selvaraj	DMK	33,363	43.27	8,867
South Arcot	64	Mangalore	A. Krishnan	DMK	34,538	56.67	P. Vedamanickam	INC	21,669	35.56	12,869
South Arcot	65	Ulundurpet	M. Kandaswamy Padayachi	INC	26,796	47.23	V. S. Padayachi	DMK	25,236	44.48	1,560
South Arcot	66	Tirukkoyilur	E. M. Subramaniam	INC	34,259	51.25	A. S. Kumarasamy	DMK	32,586	48.75	1,673
South Arcot	67	Mugaiyur	A. Govindasamy	DMK	37,598	56.42	N. K Ganapathy	INC	25,555	38.35	12,043
South Arcot	68	Rishivandiyam	M. Anandan	DMK	26,491	49.6	L. Anandan	INC	26,173	49	318
South Arcot	69	Sankarapuram	S. P. Pachaiyappan	DMK	28,292	54.75	D. Muthusami	INC	22,774	44.07	5,518
South Arcot	70	Kallakurichi	D. K. Naidu	DMK	39,175	56.38	V. T. Elayapillai	INC	28,642	41.22	10,533
Dharmapuri	71	Hosur	B. Venkataswami	SWA	21,530	52.69	K. A. Pillai	INC	19,329	47.31	2,201
Dharmapuri	72	Uddanapalle	K. S. Kothandramiah	SWA	29,391	65.75	D. C. Vijendriah	INC	15,313	34.25	14,078
Dharmapuri	73	Krishnagiri	P. M. M. Gounder	INC	24,220	47.31	C. Manniappan	DMK	24,035	46.95	185
Dharmapuri	74	Kaveripatnam	P. Naidu	INC	32,953	52.74	P. V. Seeramulu	DMK	29,532	47.26	3,421
Dharmapuri	75	Uttangarai	T. T. Gounder	INC	31,791	49.06	K. R. Krishnan	DMK	29,751	45.91	2,040
Dharmapuri	76	Harur	N. Theerthagiri	INC	27,565	48.09	N. Arumugam	DMK	27,017	47.14	548
Dharmapuri	77	Dharmapuri	M. S. Gounter	DMK	36,258	53.02	D. N. Vadivel	INC	29,567	43.23	6,691
Dharmapuri	78	Palacode	K. Murugesan	INC	29,186	50.05	M. B. Munusamy	DMK	26,096	44.75	3,090
Dharmapuri	79	Pennagaram	P. K. C. Muthusamy	INC	27,913	49.2	N. Manickam	DMK	26,570	46.84	1,343
Salem	80	Mettur	M. Surendran	PSP	30,635	48.78	K. K. Gounder	INC	24,597	39.17	6,038
Salem	81	Taramangalam	Govindan	DMK	33,222	57.8	M. S. Krishnan	INC	24,259	42.2	8,963
Salem	82	Omalur	C. Palani	DMK	28,121	56.17	C. Govindan	INC	17,876	35.71	10,245
Salem	83	Salem I	K. Jayaraman	DMK	46,776	57.92	P. Thiagarajan	INC	32,710	40.51	14,066
Salem	84	Salem I I	E. R. Krishnan	DMK	38,781	58	A. R. Gounder	INC	27,285	40.81	11,496
Salem	85	Yercaud	V. Chinnasamy	DMK	25,124	56.25	Ponnudurai	INC	19,537	43.75	5,587
Salem	86	Panamarathupatti	Karipatti T. Ponnumalai	DMK	34,597	53.7	C. Sepperumal	DMK	26,870	41.7	7,727
Salem	87	Veerapandi	Veerapandy S. Arumugam	DMK	42,681	66.11	N. S. Sundararajan	INC	21,876	33.89	20,805
Salem	88	Edappadi	A. Arumugam	DMK	36,935	54.7	K. S. S. Gounder	INC	30,593	45.3	6,342
Salem	89	Sankari	R. Nallamuthu	DMK	30,112	61.7	A. Rajendran	INC	17,174	35.19	12,938
Salem	90	Tiruchengodu	T. A. Rajavelu	DMK	42,479	64.73	T. P. Natesan	INC	22,131	33.72	20,348
Salem	91	Kapilamalai	C. V. Velappan	DMK	41,026	52.25	R. S. Gounder	INC	32,733	41.69	8,293
Salem	92	Namakkal	M. Muthuswamy	DMK	39,510	54.37	V. R. K. Gounder	INC	31,651	43.55	7,859
Salem	93	Sendamangalam	A. S. Gounder	INC	31,308	50.62	S. T. Doraiswamy	CPI(M)	30,537	49.38	771
Salem	94	Rasipuram	P. Periasamy	DMK	38,402	52.53	K. M. Gounder	INC	30,873	42.23	7,529
Salem	95	Attur	K. N. Sivaperumal	DMK	40,456	57.22	M. P. Subramanyam	INC	30,252	42.78	10,204
Salem	96	Talavasal	Moo. Marimuthu	DMK	33,289	55.39	A. Doraisamy	INC	24,448	40.68	8,841
Nilgiris	97	Gudalur	C. Nanjam	INC	20,675	49.24	Bomman	SWA	20,047	47.74	628
Nilgiris	98	Udhagamandalam	K. Bojan	SWA	37,525	68.03	T. K. Gowder	INC	17,636	31.97	19,889
Nilgiris	99	Coonoor	B. Gowder	DMK	31,855	58.74	M. K. N. Gowder	INC	22,380	41.26	9,475
Coimbatore	100	Mettupalayam	T. T. S. Thippiah	INC	29,709	45.42	Thooyamani	DMK	26,736	40.87	2,973
Coimbatore	101	Avanashi	R. K. Gounder	SWA	31,927	54.36	K. M. Gounder	INC	26,808	45.64	5,119
Coimbatore	102	Thondamuthur	R. Manickavachakam	DMK	42,261	59.14	V. E. Naidu	INC	26,842	37.56	15,419
Coimbatore	103	Singanallur	P. Velusamy	PSP	38,378	54.93	V. K. L. Gounder	INC	25,115	35.95	13,263
Coimbatore	104	Perur	N. Marudachalam	CPI(M)	43,740	61.49	R. Rayappan	INC	26,548	37.32	17,192
Coimbatore	105	Coimbatore (West)	J, Govindarajulu	DMK	41,059	63.85	S. R. P. P. Chettiar	INC	23,251	36.15	17,808
Coimbatore	106	Coimbatore (East)	M. Bhupathy	CPI(M)	33,122	50.81	G. R. Damodaran	INC	27,477	42.15	5,645
Coimbatore	107	Kinathukadavu	M. Kannappan	DMK	40,645	64.63	S. Gounder	INC	20,691	32.9	19,954
Coimbatore	108	Pollachi	A. P. Shanmugasundara Goundar	DMK	37,480	58.65	E. Gounder	INC	25,688	40.2	11,792
Coimbatore	109	Valparai	E. Ramaswamy	DMK	40,945	66.24	N. Nachimuthu	INC	20,868	33.76	20,077
Coimbatore	110	Udumalaipettai	S. J. Sadiq Pasha	DMK	39,796	58.17	K. Ramasami	INC	25,778	37.68	14,018
Coimbatore	111	Dharapuram	Palaniammal	DMK	42,433	65	P. Velusamy	INC	21,800	33.39	20,633
Coimbatore	112	Vellakoil	K. N. S. Gounder	DMK	46,009	62.44	D. P. Gounder	INC	26,578	36.07	19,431
Coimbatore	113	Kangayam	A. S. Gounder	INC	24,800	36.41	Velusami	DMK	24,654	36.19	146
Coimbatore	114	Pongalur	P. N. P. Gounder	DMK	38,371	61.75	P. S. Rangaswamy	INC	22,414	36.07	15,957
Coimbatore	115	Palladam	K. N. Kumarasamy Gounder	PSP	31,977	46.99	R. Sengaliappan	INC	24,421	35.89	7,556
Coimbatore	116	Tiruppur	S. Duraisamy	DMK	35,518	50.05	K. N. P. Gounder	INC	21,373	30.12	14,145
Coimbatore	117	Modakkurichi	K. R. Nallasivam	SSP	45,303	61.23	C. Kulandiammal	INC	25,444	34.39	19,859
Coimbatore	118	Perundurai	S. Balasubramanian	SSP	33,164	47.41	N. N. S. Nandradiar	INC	30,030	42.93	3,134
Coimbatore	119	Erode	M. Chinnaswamy	DMK	45,471	59.14	P. Arjunan	INC	25,808	33.57	19,663
Coimbatore	120	Bhavani	A. M. Raja	DMK	43,353	65.16	P. K. Mudaliar	INC	21,999	33.07	21,354
Coimbatore	121	Anthiyur	E. M. Natarajan	DMK	34,877	55.99	Gurumurthi	INC	27,409	44.01	7,468
Coimbatore	122	Gobichettipalayam	K. M. R. Gounder	SWA	31,974	52.61	M. Gounder	INC	27,403	45.09	4,571
Coimbatore	123	Satyamangalam	P. G. Karuthiruman	INC	25,484	49.22	S. M. Marappan	CPI(M)	24,278	46.89	1,206
Coimbatore	124	Bhavanisagar	Ramarasan	DMK	26,980	51.76	M. Velusamy	INC	22,187	42.57	4,793
Madurai	125	Oddanchatram	N. Gounder	DMK	39,817	55.55	A. P. Palaniappan	INC	30,953	43.18	8,864
Madurai	126	Palani	Krishnamoorthy	DMK	47,671	65.8	Balakrishnan	INC	24,780	34.2	22,891
Madurai	127	Periyakulam	M. Metha	DMK	36,023	54.85	R. S. Subramaniam	INC	29,648	45.15	6,375
Madurai	128	Bodinayakkanur	S. Srinivasan	INC	34,671	49.83	P. V. Durairaj	CPI(M)	33,905	48.73	766
Madurai	129	Cumbum	Rajangam	DMK	41,440	59.66	N. S. K. S. Pandiaraj	INC	28,025	40.34	13,415
Madurai	130	Theni	P. T. R. Palanivel Rajan	DMK	42,111	58.73	M. Malaichami	INC	29,597	41.27	12,514
Madurai	131	Andipatti	S. Paramasivam	SWA	35,351	54.86	A. Thiruvenkidasamy	INC	29,091	45.14	6,260
Madurai	132	Sedapatti	V. T. Thevar	SWA	41,167	63.84	T. A. Nadar	INC	21,553	33.42	19,614
Madurai	133	Tirumangalam	N. S. V. Chitthan	INC	20,319	33.58	M. P. Rajan	SWA	17,062	28.2	3,257
Madurai	134	Usilampatti	P.K. Mookiah Thevar	AIFB	44,714	72.11	A. M. N. Thevar	INC	16,225	26.17	28,489
Madurai	135	Nilakottai	A. Muniyandi	DMK	37,601	57.71	V. K. L. Gounder	INC	25,115	35.95	12,486
Madurai	136	Sholavandan	P. S. Maniyan	DMK	45,221	60.19	R. S. Servai	INC	28,728	38.24	16,493
Madurai	137	Thiruparankundram	S. Agniraju	DMK	49,169	63.94	S. Sonaimuthu	INC	26,792	34.84	22,377
Madurai	138	Madurai West	N. Sankaraiah	CPI(M)	46,882	59.42	M. Chelliah	INC	23,012	29.17	23,870
Madurai	139	Madurai Central	C. Govindarajan	DMK	39,566	62.86	V. Sankaran	INC	22,787	36.2	16,779
Madurai	140	Madurai East	K. P. Janakiammal	CPI(M)	32,173	50.32	A. G. Subburaman	INC	23,929	37.43	8,244
Madurai	141	Melur (South)	O. P. Raman	DMK	50,913	63.41	P. Kakkan	INC	29,376	36.59	21,537
Madurai	142	Melur (North)	P. Malaichamy	DMK	38,895	56.15	M. Andi Ambalam	INC	30,376	43.85	8,519
Madurai	143	Vadamadurai	P. T. Naicker	INC	30,507	49.11	V. S. Lakshmanan	DMK	28,651	46.13	1,856
Madurai	144	Dindigul	A. Balasubramanayam	CPI(M)	42,381	58.93	O. C. Pillai	INC	29,537	41.07	12,844
Madurai	145	Athoor	V. S. S. Mani Chettiyar	DMK	37,879	50.7	R. R. Reddiar	INC	36,124	48.36	1,755
Madurai	146	Vedasandur	N. Varadaraj	CPI(M)	30,063	48.16	S. N. Rao	INC	29,372	47.05	691
Tiruchirapalli	147	Aravakurichi	S. K. Gounder	SWA	46,614	67.46	V. P. Gounder	INC	22,482	32.54	24,132
Tiruchirapalli	148	Karur	T. M. Nallaswamy	INC	33,552	44.95	S. Nallaswamy	CPI(M)	28,677	38.42	4,875
Tiruchirapalli	149	Thottiyam	Vadivel	DMK	39,701	53.94	T. Veerappan	INC	29,670	40.31	10,031
Tiruchirapalli	150	Musiri	P. S. Muthuselvan	DMK	32,615	51.48	K. V. K. Reddiar	INC	27,750	43.8	4,865
Tiruchirapalli	151	Uppiliapuram	T. P. Alagamuthu	DMK	43,453	56.29	A. V. Mudaliar	INC	31,416	40.69	12,037
Tiruchirapalli	152	Perambalur	J. S. Raju	DMK	33,657	51.03	M. Ayyakannu	INC	28,864	43.76	4,793
Tiruchirapalli	153	Varahur	R. Narayanan	DMK	32,846	49.64	M. V. Perumal	INC	20,533	31.03	12,313
Tiruchirapalli	154	Andimadam	K. N. Ramachandran	DMK	32,253	48.25	N. Manickam	DMK	26,570	46.84	5,683
Tiruchirapalli	155	Jayankondam	K. A. A. K. Moorthy	DMK	34,751	52.57	S. Ramasami	INC	28,791	43.56	5,960
Tiruchirapalli	156	Ariyalur	R. Karuppiam	INC	26,440	37.37	G. Sepperumal	DMK	25,017	35.36	1,423
Tiruchirapalli	157	Lalgudi	D. Natarajan	DMK	37,352	50.63	D. R. Udaiyar	INC	34,712	47.05	2,640
Tiruchirapalli	158	Srirangam	S. Ramalingam	INC	34,474	50.48	P. Ponchockalingam	DMK	33,356	46.99	1,118
Tiruchirapalli	159	Tiruchirappalli I	M. S. Mani	DMK	34,504	52.07	A. S. G. L. Piliai	INC	31,199	47.08	3,305
Tiruchirapalli	160	Tiruchirappalli Ii	R. Nagasundaram	DMK	26,048	46.08	M. K. M. A. Salam	INC	18,842	33.33	7,206
Tiruchirapalli	161	Thiruverumbur	V. Swaminathan	INC	33,513	50.15	K. Kamakshi	DMK	28,884	43.22	4,629
Tiruchirapalli	162	Kulithalai	M. Kandaswamy	DMK	36,120	49.68	P. E. S. Reddiar	INC	32,305	44.43	3,815
Tiruchirapalli	163	Krishnarayapuram	P. Soundarapandiyan	DMK	28,444	48.72	T. V. Sannasi	INC	25,903	44.37	2,541
Tiruchirapalli	164	Kadavur	Karuraigiri Muthiah	INC	35,102	54.94	Anbil P. Dharmalingam	DMK	28,788	45.06	6,314
Tiruchirapalli	165	Viralimalai	S. S. Thethuvandar	DMK	30,288	49.63	P. P. Gounder	INC	26,354	43.19	3,934
Tiruchirapalli	166	Thirumayam	Ponnambalam	DMK	44,511	62.79	V. Ramiah	INC	24,290	34.26	20,221
Tiruchirapalli	167	Alangudi	K. V. Subbiah	DMK	32,984	50.64	T. A. S. Thangavelu	INC	32,148	49.36	836
Tiruchirapalli	168	Pudukkottai	R. V. Thondaiman	INC	45,342	62.07	Thiagarajan	DMK	25,255	34.57	20,087
Thanjavur	169	Thiruvaiyaru	G. M. Sethurar	DMK	37,693	51.94	K. B. Palani	INC	34,165	47.08	3,528
Thanjavur	170	Thanjavur	A. Y. S. Parisutha Nadar	INC	33,228	53.36	S. Natarajan	DMK	28,717	46.12	4,511
Thanjavur	171	Papanasam	R. S. Mooppanar	INC	41,323	56.57	A. M. Sali	Independent	31,077	42.54	10,246
Thanjavur	172	Valangiman	N. Somasundaram	DMK	34,436	53.1	R. Subramaniam	INC	30,418	46.9	4,018
Thanjavur	173	Kumbakonam	N. Kasiraman	INC	37,276	50.63	K. S. Mani	DMK	36,083	49.01	1,193
Thanjavur	174	Aduthurai	A. Marimuthu	INC	36,537	48.52	M. G. Mani	DMK	31,965	42.45	4,572
Thanjavur	175	Sirkazhi	K. B. S. Mani	Independent	34,316	58.23	R. Thangavelu	INC	21,502	36.48	12,814
Thanjavur	176	Sembanarkoil	S. Ganesan	DMK	40,453	65.29	S. Ramalingam	INC	21,506	34.71	18,947
Thanjavur	177	Mayiladuthurai	N. Kittappa	DMK	33,721	51.21	M.R.Krishnappa	INC	30,379	46.14	3,342
Thanjavur	178	Kuttalam	G. B. Mohan	CPI(M)	31,548	53.99	M. Sivakadaksham	INC	24,812	42.47	6,736
Thanjavur	179	Kudavasal	C. Krishnamoorthi	DMK	34,880	54.96	M. D. T. Pillai	INC	28,585	45.04	6,295
Thanjavur	180	Nannilam	P. Jayaraj	INC	26,053	46.36	T. P. Ramachandran	CPI(M)	19,571	34.83	6,482
Thanjavur	181	Thiruvarur	P.S. Dhanushokody	CPI(M)	30,510	48.04	Vedaiyan. V	INC	27,956	44.02	2,554
Thanjavur	182	Nagapattinam	K. R. Gnanasambandan	CPI(M)	36,596	56.4	R. R. V. Naidu	INC	26,462	40.78	10,134
Thanjavur	183	Vedaranyam	P. V. Thevar	INC	25,942	38.71	M. Meenakshisundaram	DMK	25,678	38.32	264
Thanjavur	184	Thiruthuraipoondi	N. Dharumalingam	DMK	23,728	38.04	K. C. Manali	CPI	22,226	35.63	1,502
Thanjavur	185	Kottur	A. K. Subbaih	CPI	28,156	42.47	C. M. Ambikapathy	INC	22,627	34.13	5,529
Thanjavur	186	Mannargudi	T. S. Swaminatha Odayar	INC	32,481	50.1	S. Narayanaswamy	DMK	31,558	48.67	923
Thanjavur	187	Orathanadu	L. Ganesan	DMK	45,232	60.82	M. D. Pillai	INC	29,139	39.18	16,093
Thanjavur	188	Gandharvakottai	R. R. Durai	INC	34,665	52.68	D. G. Kalingarar	DMK	30,434	46.25	4,231
Thanjavur	189	Pattukkottai	A. R. Marimuthu	PSP	35,198	54.6	N. Ramasamy	INC	28,056	43.52	7,142
Thanjavur	190	Peravurani	M. Krishnamurthy	DMK	35,505	45.4	A. V. Servai	INC	26,387	33.74	9,118
Thanjavur	191	Aranthangi	A. Thurairasan	DMK	42,943	53.11	K. B. Dervaikarar	INC	36,522	45.17	6,421
Ramanathapuram	192	Tiruppattur (Sivaganga)	S. Madhavan	DMK	40,170	58.73	V. S. S. Chettiar	INC	26,532	38.79	13,638
Ramanathapuram	193	Karaikudi	S. Meiyappan	SWA	38,310	58.73	C. V. C. V. V. Chettiar	INC	21,992	33.71	16,318
Ramanathapuram	194	Tiruvadanai	K. Ambalam	SWA	37,556	52.21	M. Arunachalam	INC	33,587	46.69	3,969
Ramanathapuram	195	Ilayangudi	V. Malaikannan	DMK	40,461	57.44	S. Ramachandran	INC	29,978	42.56	10,483
Ramanathapuram	196	Ramanathapuram	T. Thangappan	DMK	35,880	56.82	S. R. Sethupathy	INC	27,270	43.18	8,610
Ramanathapuram	197	Kadaladi	M. Alangaram	DMK	38,681	61.5	K. Paramalai	INC	20,556	32.68	18,125
Ramanathapuram	198	Mudukulathur	R. R. Thevar	SWA	33,790	53.17	S. A. Servai	INC	22,500	35.4	11,290
Ramanathapuram	199	Paramakudi	T. K. Siraimeetan	DMK	40,428	56.67	R. Thavasi	INC	25,962	36.39	14,466
Ramanathapuram	200	Sivaganga	S. Sethuraman	DMK	41,604	59.22	R. V. Swaminathan	INC	28,654	40.78	12,950
Ramanathapuram	201	Manamadurai	K. Cheemaichamy	SWA	30,752	44.42	C. B. Rena	INC	30,299	43.77	453
Ramanathapuram	202	Kariapatti	A. R. Perumal	SWA	28,484	45.09	P. M. Baskaran	INC	27,366	43.32	1,118
Ramanathapuram	203	Aruppukottai	S. S. Bharathi	SWA	34,153	54.68	T. K. Sundarm	INC	25,012	40.04	9,141
Ramanathapuram	204	Virudhunagar	P. Seenivasan	DMK	33,421	49.9	K. Kamaraj	INC	32,136	47.98	1,285
Ramanathapuram	205	Sattur	S. Ramaswamy Naidu	SWA	45,223	64.11	R. Krishnasamy Naidu	INC	25,313	35.89	19,910
Ramanathapuram	206	Sivakasi	S. Alagu Thevar	SWA	38,416	55.73	R. R. Thevar	INC	26,918	39.05	11,498
Ramanathapuram	207	Srivilliputhur	K. A. A. Gurusamy	DMK	36,732	53.34	S. P. Dharmaraj	INC	27,791	40.36	8,941
Ramanathapuram	208	Rajapalayam	A. A. S. Raja	Independent	38,936	53.29	P. A. A. Raja	INC	25,675	35.14	13,261
Tirunelveli	209	Vilathikulam	M. Rathinasabapathy	DMK	23,905	37.47	M. P. S. Reddiar	Independent	20,350	31.9	3,555
Tirunelveli	210	Kovilpatti	S. Alagarsamy	CPI	33,311	55.02	V. O. C. A. Pillai	INC	22,885	37.8	10,426
Tirunelveli	211	Ottapidaram	M. Muthiah	SWA	25,937	45.45	S. Dhanushkodi	INC	20,814	36.47	5,123
Tirunelveli	212	Sankarankoil	P. Durairaj	DMK	37,173	62.79	P. Urkavalan	INC	19,211	32.45	17,962
Tirunelveli	213	Vasudevanallur	A. Velladurai	DMK	33,865	50.24	M. P. Swamy	INC	26,885	39.89	6,980
Tirunelveli	214	Kadayanallur	A. R. Subbiah Mudaliar	Independent	36,349	49.89	S. M. A. Majid	INC	35,903	49.28	446
Tirunelveli	215	Tenkasi	I. A. Chidambaram Pillai	INC	34,561	49.86	K. M. K. Samsudin	DMK	33,818	48.79	743
Tirunelveli	216	Alangulam	Aladi Aruna	DMK	33,509	51.26	A. B. Balagan	INC	30,938	47.32	2,571
Tirunelveli	217	Ambasamudram	G. G. S. Dikshidar	INC	30,682	46.35	A. Nallasivan	CPI(M)	28,169	42.55	2,513
Tirunelveli	218	Cheranmahadevi	D. S. Adhimoolam	SWA	36,206	53.78	S. Chellapandian	INC	29,831	44.31	6,375
Tirunelveli	219	Gangaikondan	A. Karuppiah	DMK	34,797	59.59	M. Chellappa	INC	21,576	36.95	13,221
Tirunelveli	220	Tirunelveli	A. L. Subramanian	DMK	41,589	61.74	M. S. M. Pillai	INC	25,364	37.65	16,225
Tirunelveli	221	Melapalayam	M. M. P. Mohammed	Independent	36,123	55.04	S. R. Reddiar	INC	27,999	42.66	8,124
Tirunelveli	222	Srivaikuntam	S. P. Adithanar	DMK	41,828	62.57	R. Nadar	INC	22,767	34.06	19,061
Tirunelveli	223	Thoothukkudi	M. S. Sivasami	DMK	41,851	60.61	S. P. Nadar	INC	27,193	39.39	14,658
Tirunelveli	224	Tiruchendur	E. Fernando	DMK	39,619	56.06	S. Nadar	INC	28,971	40.99	10,648
Tirunelveli	225	Sattangulam	Martin	INC	31,143	52.51	Adithan	DMK	26,846	45.27	4,297
Tirunelveli	226	Nanguneri	N. Duraipandian	INC	33,269	53.34	T. G. Nadar	DMK	29,097	46.66	4,172
Tirunelveli	227	Radhapuram	N. Soundarapandian	INC	31,588	50.44	V. Karthesan	DMK	31,040	49.56	548
Kanyakumari	228	Kanniyakumari	B. M. Pillai	INC	37,998	56.89	S. M. Pillai	SWA	28,260	42.31	9,738
Kanyakumari	229	Nagercoil	M. C. Balan	DMK	36,502	55.05	T. Nadar	INC	29,810	44.95	6,692
Kanyakumari	230	Colachel	A. Chidambaranatha Nadar	INC	29,325	48.37	S. Retnaraj	SWA	27,879	45.99	1,446
Kanyakumari	231	Padmanabhapuram	V. George	INC	24,661	46.06	M. M. Ali	CPI(M)	17,738	33.13	6,923
Kanyakumari	232	Thiruvattar	J. James	INC	29,345	54.47	D. Gnanasingamoni	CPI(M)	21,253	39.45	8,092
Kanyakumari	233	Vilavancode	R. Ponnappan Nadar	INC	27,511	56.19	P. M. N. Pillai	Independent	16,184	33.05	11,327
Kanyakumari	234	Killiyoor	William	INC	21,423	42.4	Paniadimai	SWA	15,767	31.2	5,656

== Analysis ==
The effective grass roots campaigning by the DMK and the political acumen of Annadurai, defeated the Congress and its leader M. Bhaktavatsalam. The popularity of the United Front was so large that they were able to win an absolute majority in ten out of the 14 districts in the state, while Congress could not accomplish that in a single district. This was largely due to the fact that the United Front was able to capitalize on its growing support in large towns and cities, combined with the decline in Congress support in its traditional Schedule Caste constituencies.

=== Margin of Victory ===
The following table shows the number of seats won by corresponding parties, by the margin of votes.

Party	Less than 500	500-1000	1000-3000	3000-5000	5000-10000	10000-20000	20000+
DMK	3	1	10	9	42	56	17
SWA	—	—	5	1	5	8	1
INC	5	5	20	10	5	3	1
CPI(M)	—	—	1	1	4	4	1

== Notable losses ==
The former Chief Minister and prominent Indian National Congress leader, K. Kamaraj, lost his seat in the Virudhunagar by a margin of 1,285 votes to DMK's student leader, P. Seenivasan. Just days before the election, Kamaraj was injured in an accident and was unable to campaign, leading to his well-known remark that he would "win lying down" (i.e., without campaigning efforts). (Tamil: படுத்துக் கொண்டே ஜெயிப்பேன்). He lost the election along with the incumbent Chief Minister M. Bakthavatsalam, who lost his seat in Sriperumbudur to D. Rajarathinam from the DMK by 8926 votes. Except for G. Bhuvaraghan (the minister for Information and Publicity), all ministers of the outgoing Bakthavatsalam cabinet were defeated in this election.

There was a post-result wall-painting in Virudhunagar by DMK which said "படிக்காத காமராஜரை படித்த இளைஞன் சீனிவாசன் தோற்கடித்தார்!" ( The illiterate Kamaraj was defeated by Graduate Youth Sreenivasan!). The Congress replied with "படிக்காத முதல்வர் காமராஜர் அன்று கட்டிய அரசு கல்விக்கூடங்களில் படித்து பட்டம் வாங்கிய இளைஞன் சீனிவாசன், இப்போது அதே காமராஜரை தோற்கடித்தான்" (The Seenivasan who studied and graduated in Education Institutes built under orders of then Chief Minister of Tamil Nadu illiterate Kamaraj, has now defeated the same Kamaraj)

When the election results came in, jubilant party workers informed C. N. Annadurai that K. Kamaraj had lost the Virudhunagar seat to the relatively unknown Srinivasan. Anna, reportedly upset by the defeat, remarked that if people were willing to unseat leaders like Kamaraj, they could do the same to his government as well. After being sworn in as Chief Minister, Annadurai visited several figures who had campaigned against the DMK, including Periyar E. V. Ramasamy and M. Bhaktavatsalam.

== Government formation ==
The election results were announced on 23 February 1967, with the DMK securing an absolute majority. DMK's General Secretary, C.N. Annadurai, who had been serving as a Member of the Rajya Sabha and was newly elected to the Lok Sabha from Kancheepuram, led the party to increase its vote share to 40.6%, up from 27.1% in the 1962 election. Annadurai and the DMK had not anticipated such a decisive victory; Annadurai had contested to become a Member of Parliament rather than a Member of the Legislative Assembly. With no other consensus candidate for the Chief Minister role, Annadurai resigned from both his Rajya Sabha and Lok Sabha seats. He was nominated as Chief Minister of Madras State and formally staked a claim to form the government on 2 March 1967 He was sworn in by Governor Ujjal Singh on 6 March 1967 in Rajaji Hall. He was later elected to the Madras Legislative Council on 22 April 1967.

== Annadurai's cabinet ==
The council of ministers in C. N. Annadurai's cabinet (6 March 1967 – 10 February 1969) were all from the DMK and they are listed in the following table.

Minister	Portfolios
C.N. Annadurai	Chief Minister, General Administration, Finance, Civil services, Planning, Police, Prohibition, Overseas Indians, Refugees and Evacuees
V. R. Nedunchezhiyan	Education, Industries, Official Language, Textiles, Yarn, Handlooms, Mines and Minerals, Electricity, Iron and Steel, Companies and Religious Endowments
M. Karunanidhi	Public Works, Highways, Transport, Ports and Minor Irrigation
K. A. Mathialagan	Food, Revenue and Commercial Taxes
A. Govindasamy	Agriculture, Animal Husbandry, Fisheries, Forests and Chinchona
S. J. Sadiq Pasha	Public Health
Satyavani Muthu	Harijan Welfare and Information
M. Muthuswamy	Local Administration, Community Development, Khadi and Village Industries, Bhoodan and Gramdhan, Ex-servicemen
S. Madhavan	Law, Co-operation and Housing
N. V. Natarajan	Labour

== See also ==
- Indian general election in Madras, 1967
- Elections in Tamil Nadu
- Legislature of Tamil Nadu
- Government of Tamil Nadu
