= Melapalayam Assembly constituency =

Coordinates: 10.96°N 78.13°E

Melapalayam
- Former constituency for the Tamil Nadu Legislative Assembly

Constituency details
- Country: India
- Region: South India
- State: Tamil Nadu
- District: Tirunelveli
- Established: 1967
- Abolished: 1976
- Total electors: 96,761
- Reservation: None

Melapalayam is a state assembly constituency in Tirunelveli district, Tamil Nadu, India. It existed from 1967 to 1971.

== Members of the Legislative Assembly ==
Year	Winner	Party
1971	M. Kather Mohideen S.	Indian Union Muslim League
1967	M. M. P. Mohammed	Independent politician

== Election results ==
Vote share of winning candidates
1971	56.73%
1967	55.04%

=== 1971 ===
1971 Tamil Nadu Legislative Assembly election: Melapalayam
Party	Candidate	Votes	%	±%
IUML	M. Kather Mohideen S.	35,470	56.73%	
INC	Shanmugavel C.	21,785	34.85%	−7.82%
Independent	Susai Mariyan M.	3,743	5.99%	
Independent	Sheik Thambi P.	1,031	1.65%	
Independent	Muthusamy Pandian P.	490	0.78%	
Margin of victory		13,685	21.89%	9.51%
Turnout		62,519	69.65%	−5.84%
Registered electors		96,761		
IUML gain from Independent		Swing	1.69%	

=== 1967 ===
1967 Madras Legislative Assembly election: Melapalayam
Party	Candidate	Votes	%	±%
Independent	M. M. P. Mohammed	36,123	55.04%	
INC	S. R. Reddiar	27,999	42.66%	
Independent	P. Periasamy	1,508	2.30%	
Margin of victory		8,124	12.38%	
Turnout		65,630	75.49%	
Registered electors		91,493		
Independent win (new seat)				
