= Melur North Assembly constituency =

Coordinates: 10.040°N 78.340°E

Melur (North)
- Former constituency for the Tamil Nadu Legislative Assembly

Constituency details
- Country: India
- Region: South India
- State: Tamil Nadu
- District: Madurai
- Established: 1967
- Abolished: 1971
- Total electors: 99,053
- Reservation: None

Melur North is a state assembly constituency in Madurai district, Tamil Nadu, India. It existed from 1967 to 1971.

== Members of the Legislative Assembly ==
Year	Winner	Party
1971	P. Malaichamy	Dravida Munnetra Kazhagam
1967	P. Malaichamy	Dravida Munnetra Kazhagam

== Election results ==
Vote share of winning candidates
1971	50.09%
1967	56.15%

=== 1971 ===
1971 Tamil Nadu Legislative Assembly election: Melur (North)
Party	Candidate	Votes	%	±%
DMK	P. Malaichamy	37,337	50.09%	−6.06%
INC	M. Andi Ambalam	37,210	49.91%	6.06%
Margin of victory		127	0.17%	−12.13%
Turnout		74,547	78.67%	−2.31%
Registered electors		99,053		
DMK hold		Swing	-6.06%	

=== 1967 ===
1967 Madras Legislative Assembly election: Melur (North)
Party	Candidate	Votes	%	±%
DMK	P. Malaichamy	38,895	56.15%	
INC	M. Andi Ambalam	30,376	43.85%	
Margin of victory		8,519	12.30%	
Turnout		69,271	80.98%	
Registered electors		88,373		
DMK win (new seat)				
