= K. Rajah Pillai =

Indian politician

K. Rajah Pillai was an Indian politician and former Member of the Legislative Assembly. He was elected to the Tamil Nadu legislative assembly as a Dravida Munnetra Kazhagam candidate from Kanyakumari constituency in Kanyakumari district in 1971 election. He was social activist and was liked by all the people of Nagercoil.
