= Kadavur Assembly constituency =

Former assembly constituency of Tamil Nadu, India

Coordinates: 10.73°N 78.23°E

Kadavur
- Former constituency for the Tamil Nadu Legislative Assembly

Constituency details
- Country: India
- Region: South India
- State: Tamil Nadu
- District: Karur
- Established: 1967
- Abolished: 1971
- Reservation: None

Kadavur is a former state assembly constituency in Karur district, Tamil Nadu, India. It existed from 1967 to 1971.

== Members of the Legislative Assembly ==
Year	Winner	Party
1971	Karuraigiri Muthiah	Indian National Congress
1967	K. K. Muthiah	Indian National Congress

== Election results ==
Vote share of winning candidates
1971	51.62%
1967	54.94%

=== 1971 ===
1971 Tamil Nadu Legislative Assembly election: Kadavur
Party	Candidate	Votes	%	±%
INC	Karuraigiri Muthiah	31,752	51.62%	−3.32%
DMK	P. Krishnasamy	29,763	48.38%	3.32%
Margin of victory		1,989	3.23%	−6.65%
Turnout		61,515	69.54%	−7.60%
Registered electors		93,616		
INC hold		Swing	-3.32%	

=== 1967 ===
1967 Madras Legislative Assembly election: Kadavur
Party	Candidate	Votes	%	±%
INC	Karuraigiri Muthiah	35,102	54.94%	
DMK	A. P. Dharmalingam	28,788	45.06%	
Margin of victory		6,314	9.88%	
Turnout		63,890	77.14%	
Registered electors		86,286		
INC win (new seat)				
