= T. Soniah =

Indian politician

T. Soniah was an Indian politician and former Member of the Legislative Assembly of Tamil Nadu. He was elected to the Tamil Nadu legislative assembly as a Dravida Munnetra Kazhagam candidate from Manamadurai constituency in the 1971 election.
