= N. S. Balaraman =

Indian politician

N. S. Balaraman was an Indian politician and former Member of the Legislative Assembly of Tamil Nadu. He was elected to the Tamil Nadu legislative assembly as a Dravida Munnetra Kazhagam candidate from Arakkonam constituency in the 1971 election.

== Electoral performance ==
Election	Constituency	Political party	Result	Vote %	Opposition			Ref
Election	Constituency	Political party	Result	Vote %	Candidate	Political party	Vote %	Ref
1971	Arakkonam	DMK	Won	60.11%	S. K. Subramania Mudaly	INC	38.24%	
