= Kariapatti Assembly constituency =

Coordinates: 9.67°N 78.10°E

Kariapatti
- Former constituency for the Tamil Nadu Legislative Assembly

Constituency details
- Country: India
- Region: South India
- State: Tamil Nadu
- District: Virudhunagar
- Established: 1967
- Abolished: 1976
- Total electors: 94,337
- Reservation: None

Kariapatti was former state assembly constituency in Virudhunagar district, Tamil Nadu, India. It existed from 1967 to 1971.

== Members of the Legislative Assembly ==
Year	Winner	Party
1971	A. R. Perumal	All India Forward Bloc
1967	A. R. Perumal	Swatantra Party

== Election results ==
Vote share of winning candidates
1971	51.33%
1967	45.09%

=== 1971 ===
1971 Tamil Nadu Legislative Assembly election: Kariapatti
Party	Candidate	Votes	%	±%
AIFB	A. R. Perumal	31,499	51.33%	
INC	Muthuvel Serval M.	22,175	36.14%	−7.18%
Independent	David Ramasamy S.	7,096	11.56%	
Independent	Meyya Thevar V.	590	0.96%	
Margin of victory		9,324	15.20%	13.43%
Turnout		61,360	67.56%	−5.80%
Registered electors		94,337		
AIFB gain from SWA		Swing	6.24%	

=== 1967 ===
1967 Madras Legislative Assembly election: Kariapatti
Party	Candidate	Votes	%	±%
SWA	A. R. Perumal	28,484	45.09%	
INC	P. M. Baskaran	27,366	43.32%	
Independent	K. K. Thevar	7,316	11.58%	
Margin of victory		1,118	1.77%	
Turnout		63,166	73.37%	
Registered electors		89,931		
SWA win (new seat)				
