= S. Kandappan =

Indian politician

S. Kandappan is an Indian politician and former Member of the Legislative Assembly of Tamil Nadu. He was elected to the Tamil Nadu Legislative Assembly as a Dravida Munnetra Kazhagam candidate from Tiruchengode constituency in the 1971 election.
