= S. Sadasiva Padayachi =

Indian politician

S. Sadasiva Padayachi is an Indian politician and former Member of the Legislative Assembly of Tamil Nadu. He was elected to the Tamil Nadu legislative assembly as a Dravida Munnetra Kazhagam candidate from Andimadam constituency in the 1971 election.
