= Nedunchezhiyan =

Nedunchezhiyan is a surname. Notable people with the surname include:

- Aishwarya Nedunchezhiyan (born 1996), Indian sailor
- Jeevan Nedunchezhiyan (born 1988), Indian tennis player
- V. R. Nedunchezhiyan (1920–2000), Indian politician
