= N. Kasiraman =

Indian politician

Narayana Iyer Kasiraman (died April 11, 1999) was an Indian politician and former Member of the Legislative Assembly of Tamil Nadu. He was elected to the Tamil Nadu legislative assembly from Kumbakonam constituency as an Indian National Congress candidate in 1967 election, and as an Indian National Congress (Organisation) candidate 1971 election.

== Personal life ==
Kasiraman was born to P. S. Narayana Iyer in Kumbakonam. Narayana Iyer was a transportation businessman and founder of Raman and Raman Limited, the biggest transport operators in the town. Kasiraman died on April 11, 1999.
