= A. Subramaniam =

Indian politician (died 2019)

Tamil Nadu Legislative Assembly
- In office 1971–1977
- Preceded by: P. Velusamy
- Succeeded by: R. Venkedusamy
- Constituency: Singanallur

Personal details
- Born: 1925/26
- Died: 20 March 2019 (aged 93)
- Party: Praja Socialist Party

A. Subramaniam was an Indian freedom fighter and politician belonging to Praja Socialist Party. He took part in Quit India Movement. For taking part in this movement he was sent to jail. He was elected as a member of the Tamil Nadu Legislative Assembly from Singanallur in 1971. He died on 20 March 2019 at the age of 93.
