= 1957 Madras State Legislative Assembly election =

Indian state legislative election

1957 Madras Legislative Assembly election
- 1, 4, 6, 8 and 11 March 1957 (5 days)

All 205 seats in the Legislature of Madras State 103 seats needed for a majority
- Turnout: 46.56% (▼8.19%)
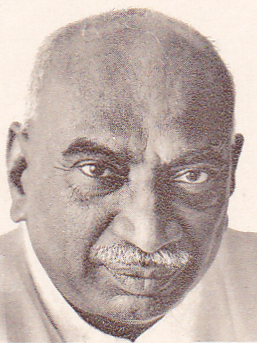

	First party	Second party
Leader	K. Kamaraj	M. Kalyanasundaram
Party	INC	CPI
Leader's seat	Sattur	Tiruchirappalli – II
Seats won	151	4
Seat change	▲24	▼58
Popular vote	5,046,576	8,23,582
Percentage	45.34%	7.4%
Swing	▲10.46%	▼5.78%
Chief Minister before election
K. Kamaraj
INC
Elected Chief Minister
K. Kamaraj
INC

The second legislative assembly election to the Madras state (presently Tamil Nadu) was held for 5 days; 1, 4, 6, 8 and 11 March 1957. This was the first election held after the linguistic reorganisation of Madras State in 1956. Indian National Congress and its leader, K. Kamaraj won the election and defeated their rival, Dravida Munnetra Kazhagam. In 1954, due to the resignation of C. Rajagopalachari, for his controversial Kula Kalvi Thittam, the leadership of Congress was contested between K. Kamaraj, and C. Subramaniam (who got the support of M. Bhaktavatsalam). Eventually, K. Kamaraj, won the support of the party, was elected leader and chief minister of Madras State in 1954. In a surprise move, he appointed both M. Bhaktavatsalam and C. Subramaniam, to his cabinet, allowing great unity amongst the Congress that ruled the state of Madras, for the next decade. This election saw future DMK leaders M. Karunanidhi and K. Anbazhagan win their first MLA seats in the legislative assembly.

== Delimitation and reorganisation ==
On 1 October 1953, a separate Andhra State consisting of the Telugu-speaking areas of the composite Madras State was formed, and the Kannada-speaking area of Bellary District was merged with the then Mysore State. This reduced the strength of the Legislative Assembly to 231.

On 1 November 1956, the States Reorganisation Act 1956 took effect, and consequently, the constituencies in the erstwhile Malabar district were merged with the Kerala State. This further reduced the strength to 190. The Tamil-speaking area of Kerala (present-day Kanyakumari district) and Shenkottah taluk were added to Madras State.

According to the new Delimitation of Parliamentary and Assembly Constituencies Order 1956, made by the Delimitation Commission of India under the provisions of the State Reorganisation Act, 1956, the strength of the Madras Legislative Assembly was increased to 205. The 1957 elections were conducted for these 205 seats. In 1959, as a result of The Andhra Pradesh and Madras (Alteration of Boundaries) Act 1959, one member of the Andhra Pradesh Legislative Assembly was allotted to Madras, increasing its Legislative Assembly strength to 206.

== Two-member constituencies ==
Out of the total 167 constituencies in the state, 38 were two-member constituencies, 37 of which had one reserved for Scheduled caste candidates and one for Scheduled tribe candidates. These constituencies were larger in size and had a greater number of voters (more than 1,00,000) when compared to general constituencies. Two separate lists of candidates, a general list and a reserved list, are contested in those constituencies. Each voter had to cast two votes, one for each list.

The two winners were chosen as follows:

- Reserved Member: Candidate with the most votes among the reserved (SC/ST) list candidates
- General Member: Candidate with the most votes among the rest of the candidates, excluding the Reserved Member (including both reserved and general lists).

This system led to anomalies. In some cases, like the Coimbatore-II constituency in the 1957 election, both elected members belonged to the reserved list; the candidate with the second highest number of votes in the reserved list secured more votes than the highest vote-getter in the general list. Multiple members were elected only in the 1952 and 1957 elections, as double-member representation was abolished in 1961 by the enactment of the Two-Member Constituencies Abolition Act, 1961.

== Parties and issues ==
Indian National Congress, Communist Party of India, Forward Bloc, Praja Socialist Party, Socialist Party, Congress Reform Committee (Indian National Democratic Congress), and Dravida Munnetra Kazhagam (DMK) were the major parties contesting this election. This was the first election contested by the DMK since its formation in 1949. The decision to contest elections was taken in 1956 at the party's Trichy conference. The party fielded its candidates in 8 parliamentary and 117 assembly seats as independents since it was not an officially recognised party. The increased Tamilian character of the Congress party after the appointment of K. Kamaraj, a non-Brahman, as Chief Minister of Tamil Nadu, robbed DMK of its main electoral plank as the sole proponent of Tamil nationalism. It increasingly changed its focus to economic issues and the slower industrialization of the South as an election issue. The DMK election manifesto had a socialist image, and the creation of Dravida Nadu became a side issue as it implicitly accepted the prevailing constitutional order.

Periyar E. V. Ramasamy issued a statement in support of K. Kamaraj before the commencement of the election. In October 1956, the central executive of Dravidar Kazhagam resolved to support K. Kamaraj.

Since Mr. Kamaraj has done his best to serve the Tamilians, since he has changed Acharyar's educational system designed to perpetuate the caste system, since he has conferred many jobs and many benefits on Tamilians in the educational and other spheres and since the Brahman and DMK people are trying to oust him from power, it has become the duty of all Tamilians to support Mr. Kamaraj and his followers in the election

K. Kamaraj accepted the support of Dravidar Kazhagam and said if the Kazhagam canvassed votes for him out of their own free will, he could not possibly tell them he did not want their votes. He also made it clear that the Congress party cannot support a party that is communal in nature, and he did not in any way share E. V. Ramasamy's views.

K. Kamaraj's decision to accept support and provide candidature to some former members of Dravidar Kazhagam caused division within Congress, resulting in a new party called the Congress Reform Committee (CRC). Though the party was created in the last moment, it fielded candidates in 12 parliamentary and 55 assembly seats.

Forward Bloc Leader Pasumpon Muthuramalinga Thevar accused the ruling Congress party of engaging in vote-buying practices by distributing money to voters and urged the electorate to reject such inducements, describing them as immoral. He pointed out that people willingly spent ₹2 to ₹5 to witness Jallikattu, and argued that accepting ₹5 or ₹10 in exchange for exercising one’s franchise was wrong.

== Voting and results ==
Source: Election Commission of India

Summary of results of the 1957 Madras Legislative Assembly election
Political party	Flag	Seats Contested	Won	% of Seats	Votes	Vote %	Change in vote %
Indian National Congress	INC Flag Official	204	151 (▼1)	73.66	50,46,576	45.34	▲10.46
Communist Party of India		58	4 (▼58)	1.95	8,23,582	7.40	▼5.78
Praja Socialist Party		23	2 (New)	0.98	2,93,778	2.64	New
Independent		602	48 (▼14)	23.41	49,67,060	44.62	N/A
		Total Seats	205 (▼170)	Voters	2,39,05,575	Turnout	1,11,30,996 (46.56%)

DMK was not officially recognised as a party by the Election Commission of India until 1962, so it was registered as an independent party. The Congress Reform Committee was the second and Dravida Munnetra Kazhagam was the third party in the assembly. Congress won 45% of the vote, the CRC 8%, and the DMK 14%.

=== By constituency ===
*	Elected as Chief Minister of Madras State
**	DMK Candidates contesting as independents

S.No	Constituency	Winner	Party	Runner up	Party
Madras City
1	Washermanpet	M. Mayandi Nadar	INC	N. Jeevarathnam	IND
2	Harbour	U. Krishna Rao	INC	G. Rajamannar Chettiar	PSP
3	Basin Bridge	T. N. Anandanayaki	INC	N. V. Natarajan	IND
4	Perambur	1) Pakkiriswami Pillai; 3) Satyavani Muthu	IND; IND	2) T. S. Govindaswamy; 4) T. Rajagopal	INC; INC
5	Thousand lights	A. V. P. Asaithambi	IND	K. Venkatasamy Naidu	INC
6	Egmore	Anbazhagan	IND	Radhakrishnan	INC
7	Triplicane	K. S. G. Haja Shareef	INC	Appadurai	IND
8	Mylapore	C. R. Ramaswamy	INC	Kumari S. Vijayalakshmi	PSP
9	T. Nagar	K. Vinayakam	INC	A. S. Jesupatham	IND
Chingleput
10	Maduranthakam	1) O. Venkatasubba Reddy; 4) Ellappan	INC; IND	2) O.N. Doraibabu; 3) V.L. Raja	IND; IND
11	Chengalpattu	1) Muthuswamy Naicker; 2) Appavu	INC	3) Ramachandran; 4) Rathinam	IND
12	Saidapet	A. S. Doraiswami Reddiar	INC	N. P. Loganathan	IND
13	Ponneri	1) V. Govindasami Naidu; 2) T. P. Elumalai	INC; INC	3) T. Shanmugam; 4) Changam Pillai	IND; IND
14	Gummidipundi	Kamalambuiammal	INC	Venugopal Reddy	IND
15	Tiruvallur	1) Eakambara Mudaly; 2) V. S. Arunachalam	INC; INC	3) N. Govindasamy Naidu; 4) M. Dharmalingam	IND; IND
16	Sriperumbudur	M. Bhaktavatsalam	INC	C. V. M. Annamalai	IND
17	Uthiramerur	V. K. Ramaswamy Mudaliar	IND	K. Duraiswamy Nayagar	INC
18	Kancheepuram	C. N. Annadurai	IND	P. S. Srinivasan	INC
North Arcot
19	Arakkonam	S. C. Sadayappa Mudaliar	INC	Thomas	IND
20	Sholinghur	B. Bhakthavatsalu Naidu	INC	M. Subramanian Naicker	IND
21	Cheyyar	P. Ramachandran	INC	V. Darmalinga Nayagar	IND
22	Vandavasi	1) M. Ramachandra Reddy; 3) D. Dasarathan	INC; INC	2) A. Dharma Gounder; 4) S. Muthulingam	IND; IND
23	Arcot	S. Khader Sheriff	INC	Lachaumanan	IND
24	Ranipet	Chandrasekara Naicker	INC	R. A. Subhaan	IND
25	Gudiyatham	1) V. K. Kothandaraman; 2) T. Manavalan	CPI; INC	3) Venkatachalam; 4) M. Krishnasami	INC; IND
26	Vellore	M. P. Sarathy	IND	Sundara Gounder	CPI
27	Ambur	1) V. K. Krishnamurthy; 3) S. R. Munusami	INC; IND	2) Sampangi Naidu; 4) A. R. Rathnasamy	IND; INC
28	Arni	P. Doraisamy Reddiar	IND	V. K. Kannan	INC
29	Polur	S. M. Annamalai	IND	T. B. Kesava Reddiar	IND
30	Thurinjapuram	M. A. Manickavelu	INC	S. Murugan	IND
31	Tiruvannamalai	1) P. U. Shanmugham; 2) C. Santhanam	IND; IND	3) V. K. Annamalai Gounder; 4) A. Arumugam	INC
32	Chengam	T. Karia Goundar	INC	R. Venkatachala Mudaliar	IND
33	Vaniyambadi	A. A. Rasheed	INC	M. P. Vadivelu Gounder	IND
34	Tiruppattur	R. C. Samanna Gounder	INC	Natesa Pillai	IND
Salem
35	Harur	1) P. M. Munusami Gounder; 2) M. K. Mariappan	INC; INC	3) T. Ponnusamy; 4) C. Theerthagiri	IND; IND
36	Krishnagiri	S. Nagaraja Manigar	INC	N. Mohanram	IND
37	Uddanapalli	Muni Reddi	IND	Venkatakrishna Desai	INC
38	Hosur	K. Appavoo Pillai	IND	N. Ramachandra Reddy	INC
39	Pennagaram	Hemalatha Devi	INC	D. K. Gorunatha Chettiar	IND
40	Dharmapuri	M. Kandasami Kandar	INC	R. S. Veerappa Chetty	IND
41	Yercaud	1) S. Andi Goundan; 2) S. Lakshmana Goundar	INC; INC	3) Raja Paul David; 4) Kuppusami Goundan	IND; IND
42	Salem I	A. Mariappan Mudaliar	INC	V. R. Nedunchezhiyan	IND
43	Salem II	A. Rathnavel Gounder	INC	S. M. Ramiah	CPI
44	Veerapandy	M. R. Kandasamy Mudaliar	INC	Chelliah	IND
45	Taramangalam	N. S. Sundararajan	INC	Chinnappan	IND
46	Mettur	K. S. Ardhanareeswara Gounder	INC	Surendiran	PSP
47	Sankari	K. S. Subramanya Gounder	INC	R. Thandavan	IND
48	Tiruchengode	1) T. M. Kaliannan; 2) R. Kandaswami	INC; INC	3) Rangasamy Gounder; 4) Komaran	IND; PSP
49	Namakkal	1) P. Kolanda Gounder; 3) M. P. Periasami	INC; INC	2) V. Kaliappan; 4) Marudaveeran	IND; IND
50	Sendamangalam	T. Sivagnanam Pillai	INC	Somasundara Gounder	IND
51	Rasipuram	A. Raja Gounder	INC	K. V. K. Ramaswamy	IND
52	Attur	1) Irusappan; 2) M. P. Subramaniam	IND; IND	3) A. Sambasiva Reddiar; 4) M. Arumugham	INC; IND
South Arcot
53	Kallakurichi	1) Nataraja Odayar; 3) M. Anandan	IND; IND	2) Parthasarathy; 4) L. Anandan	INC; INC
54	Tirukoilur	1) S. A. M. Annamalai Odayar; 3) Kuppusami	IND; INC	2) Lakshmi Narasamma; 4) Muthusami	INC; IND
55	Satyamangalam	K. Gopal Gounder	IND	K. Aranganathan	INC
56	Gingee	M. Jangal Reddiar	IND	V. Gopal Gounder	IND
57	Tindivanam	1) P. Veerappa Gounder; 2) M. Jagannathan	IND; IND	3) Venugopal Gounder; 4) Pichaikuppan	INC; INC
58	Valavanur	A. Govindasami Nayagar	IND	K. M. Krishna Gounder	INC
59	Villupuram	Sarangapani Gounder	INC	Shanmuga Udayar	IND
60	Ulundurpet	Kandasami Padayachi	INC	Manonmani Ammal	IND
61	Cuddalore	Seenivasa Padayachi	INC	Sambandan	IND
62	Nellikuppam	1) Sivachidambara Ramasamy Padayachi; 3) S. Thangavelu	INC; INC	2) Krishnamoorthy Gounder; 4) Rajaangam	IND; IND
63	Nallur	Vedamanickam	IND	K. S. Venkatakrishna Reddiar	IND
64	Vridhachalam	M. Selvaraj	IND	G. Rajavelu Padayachi	INC
65	Bhuvanagiri	Samikannu Padayachi	INC	R. Balagurusamy	IND
66	Chidambaram	1) G. Vagheesam Pillai; 2) Swami Sahajananda	INC; INC	3) Chokalingam; 4) Sivasubramaniam	IND; IND
Tanjore
67	Sirkazhi	1) C. Muthia Pillai; 2) K. B. S. Mani	INC; INC	3) K. Sami Durai Annangar; 4) V. Velayutham	CPI; CPI
68	Mayuram	1) G. Narayanasami Naidu; 2) P. Jayaraj	INC; INC	3) M. Kathamuthu; 4) A. R. Marianathan	CPI; CPI
69	Nannilam	1) M. D. Thiagaraja Pillai; 2) M. C. Muthukumaraswami	INC; INC	3) S. Arunachalam Pillai; 4) P. Appaswamy	CPI; CPI
70	Nagapattinam	N. S. Ramalingam	INC	P. Jeevanandam	CPI
71	Tiruthuraipundi	1) V. Vedayyan; 2) A. Vedaratnam	INC; INC	3) C. Kandasamy; 4) S. Vadivelu	CPI; CPI
72	Mannargudi	T. S. Swaminatha Odayar	INC	S. K. Sivanada Saluvar	IND
73	Aduthurai	Ramamirtha Thondaiman	INC	Mohammed Amirdeen	IND
74	Kumbakonam	T. Sambath	INC	Neelamegham	IND
75	Panjapatti	Karunagiri Muthaiah	INC	P. Poonambala Gounder	IND
76	Tiruvayur	R. Swaminatha Merkondar	INC	D. Pakshiraja Moovarayar	IND
77	Thanjavur	A. Y. S. Parisutha Nadar	INC	R. Gopalakrishnan	IND
78	Gandarvakottai	Krishnasami Gopalar	INC	Ramachandra Dorai	IND
79	Adiramapattinam	A. R. Marimuthu	PSP	N. Sunderasa Thevar	INC
80	Pattukottai	R. Srinivasa Ayyar	INC	V. Arunachala Thevar	IND
81	Arantangi	S. Ramasami Thevar	IND	Muthuvel Ambalam	INC
Tiruchirappalli
82	Thirumayam	V. Ramiah	INC	Muthuvairava Ambalagarar	IND
83	Alangudi	1) Arunachala Thevar; 2) Chinniah	INC; INC	Subbiah; Balakrishnan	IND
84	Andanallur	Annamalai Muthuraja	INC	E. P. Mathuram	IND
85	Tiruchirappalli - I	E. P. Mathuram	IND	T. Durairaj Pillai	INC
86	Tiruchirappalli - II	M. Kalyanasundaram	CPI	Subburethinam	INC
87	Srirangam	K. Vasudevan	INC	Chitrambalam	IND
88	Lalgudi	S. Lazar	INC	Anbil P. Dharmalingam	IND
89	T Palur	Subbiah	INC	Ramasamy	IND
90	Jayankondam	K. R. Viswanathan	INC	Jayaramulu Chettiar	IND
91	Ariyalur	Ramalinga Padayachi	INC	Narayanan	IND
92	Perambalur	1) Krishnasami; 3) K. Periyannan	INC; INC	2) Raja Chidambaram; 4) Adimoolam	IND; IND
93	Musiri	1) V. A. Muthaiya; 2) T. V. Sannasi	INC; INC	3) M. P. Muthukaruppan; 4) Durairaj	IND; IND
94	Karur	T. M. Nallaswamy	INC	K. S. Ramasami	CPI
95	Aravakurichi	S. Sadasivam	INC	N. Rathinam	IND
96	Kulithalai	M. Karunanidhi	IND	K. A. Dharmalingam	INC
97	Papanasam	1) Venkitachala Nattar; 2) R. Subramaniam	INC; INC	3) Haritharanathan; 4) Tajudeen	IND; IND
98	Manapparai	N. P. M. Chinnaya Kavundar	INC	A. Rajagopal Pillai	IND
Ramanathapuram
99	Tirukoshtiyur	N. V. Chockalingam	INC	S. Shanmugam	CPI
100	Karaikudi	M. A. Muthiah Chettiar	INC	Ganesan Saw	IND
101	Sivaganga	D. Subramania Rajkumar	IND	Saminathan	INC
102	Tiruvadanai	KR. RM. Kariamanickamambalam	IND	S. Ramakrishnathevar	INC
103	Manamadurai	R. Chidambara Bharathi	INC	S. Alagu	IND
104	Paramakudi	K. Ramachandran	IND	G. Govindan	INC
105	Ramanathapuram	R. Shanmuga Rajeshwara Sethupathi	IND	G. Mangalasamy	CPI
106	Mudukulathur	1) U. Muthuramalinga Thevar; 2) A. Perumal	IND; IND	3) Chinniah; 4) A. Krishnan	INC; INC
107	Aruppukottai	M. D. Ramasami	IND	A. V. Thiruppathi	INC
108	Sattur	K. Kamaraj	INC	Jayarama Reddiar	IND
109	Sivakasi	S. Ramasami Naidu	INC	P. Muthuramanuja Thevar	IND
110	Srivilliputhur	1) R. Krishnasami Naidu; 2) A. Chinnasami	INC; INC	3) S. Alagarsamy; 4) Gurusami	CPI; IND
Tirunelveli
111	Kovilpatti	V. Suppaya Naicker	IND	Selvaraj	INC
112	Kadambur	1) K. Ramasubbu; 2) Sangili	INC; INC	3) S. Arunachala Nadar; 4) V. Suppayan	IND; IND
113	Tuticorin	Ponnusami Nadar	INC	M. S. Sivamani	IND
114	Srivaikuntam	A. P. C. Veerabahu	INC	Y. Perumal	IND
115	Tiruchendur	M. S. Selvaraj	INC	M. R. Meganathan	IND
116	Sathankulam	S. P. Adithanar	IND	S. Kandasamy	INC
117	Radhapuram	A. V. Thomas	INC	Kartheesan	IND
118	Nanguneri	M. G. Sankar Reddiar	INC	S. Madasamy	IND
119	Tirunelveli	1) Rajathi Kunchithapatham; 2) Somasundaram	INC; INC	3) Kandish; 4) Ponnusami	IND; PSP
120	Ambasamudram	Gomathisankara Deekshidar	INC	Challapandian	IND
121	Kadayam	D. S. Athimoolam	IND	A. Balagan	INC
122	Tenkasi	K. Sattanatha Karayalar	IND	I. A. Chidambaram Pillai	INC
123	Alangulam	Veluchamy Thevar	IND	Nallasivan	CPI
124	Sankarankoil	1) P. Urkavalan; 2) A. R. Subbiah Mudaliar	INC; INC	3) Adinamilagi; 4) S. Uthaman	IND; PSP
Kanyakumari
125	Kanyakumari	T. S. Ramaswamy Pillai	IND	Natarajan	INC
126	Nagercoil	Chidambaranatha Nadar	INC	C. Sankar	CPI
127	Colachel	Lourdammal	INC	S. Doraiswamy	IND
128	Padmanabhapuram	Thompson Dharmaraj Daniel	INC	S. Muthukaruppa Pillai	IND
129	Killiyur	A. Nesamony	INC	Uncontested	Uncontested
130	Vilavancode	M. William	INC	Uncontested	Uncontested
Madurai
131	Uthamapalayam	K. Pandiaraj	INC	P. T. Rajan	IND
132	Bodinayakkanur	A. S. Subbaraj	INC	M. Muthiala	IND
133	Kodaikanal	M. Alagirisamy	INC	Gurusamy	IND
134	Theni	1) N. R. Thiagarajan; 3) N. M. Velappan	INC; INC	2) S. S. Rajendran; 4) A. Ayyanar	IND; IND
135	Usilampatti	MUTHU	IND	P. V. Raj	-
136	Thirumangalam	A. V. P. Periavala Guruya Reddi	IND	K. Rajaram	INC
137	Madurai East	P. K. R. Lakshmi Kanthan	INC	N. Sankaraiah	CPM
138	Madurai Central	V. Sankaran	INC	S. Muthu	IND
139	Thirupparankundram	S. Chinnakaruppa Thevar	INC	K. P. Janaki	CPI
140	Nilakkottai	1) W. P. A. R. Chandrasekaran; 2) A. S. Ponnammal	INC; INC	3) T. G. Krishnamoorthy; 4) M. Vadivel	IND; IND
141	Melur	1) P. Kakkan; 2) M. Periyakaruppan Ambalam	INC; INC	3) K. Paramasivam Ambalan; 4) P. Vadivel	IND; IND
142	Vadamadurai	Thiruvenkatasamy Naicker	IND	S. Chiinasamy Naidu	INC
143	Vedasandur	T. S. Soundaram Ramachandran	INC	Madanagopal	CPI
144	Dindigul	M. J. Jamal Mohideen	INC	A. Balasubramaniam	CPI
145	Atoor	M. A. B. Arumugasamy Chettiar	INC	V. S. S. Mani Chettiyar	IND
146	Oddanchatram	Karuthappa Gounder	INC	Angamuthu Naicker	IND
147	Palani	Lakshmipathiraj	INC	Venkitasami Gounder	IND
Coimbatore
148	Udumalpet	S. T. Subbaya Gounder	IND	N. Mounaguruswamy Naidu	INC
149	Pollachi	1) N. Mahalingam; 2) K. Ponniah	INC; INC	3) P. Thangavel Gounder; 4) V. K. Rangaswamy	PSP; CPI
150	Kovilpalayam	C. Subramaniam	INC	C. Guruswamy Naidu	PSP
151	Dharapuram	A. Sanapathi Gounder	INC	P. S. Govindasamy Gounder	IND
152	Kangayam	K. G. Palanisamy Gounder	INC	P. Muthuswamy Gounder	IND
153	Chennimalai	K. P. Nallasivam	IND	A. Thengappa Gounder	INC
154	Erode	V. S. Manickasundaram	INC	K. T. Raju	CPI
155	Perundurai	N. K. Palanisami	CPI	Manicka Mudaliar	INC
156	Bhavani	1) G. G. Gurumurthi; 2) P. G. Manickam	INC; INC	3) K. Komarasami Gounder; 4) A. Subramanian	IND; IND
157	Gobichettipalayam	P. G. Karuthiruman	INC	Mariappan	CPI
158	Nambiyur	K. L. Ramaswami	INC	Uncontested	Uncontested
159	Tiruppur	K. N. Palanisamy	INC	V. Ponnulinga Gounder	CPI
160	Palladam	P. S. Chinnadurai	PSP	Kumarasami Gounder	INC
161	Coimbatore - I	Savitri Shanmugam	INC	Bupathy	CPI
162	Coimbatore - II	1) Marudachalam; 2) Palaniswamy	CPI; INC	3) Kuppuswamy; 4) P. Veluswamy	INC; PSP
163	Sulur	Kulanthai Ammal	INC	K. Ramani	CPI
164	Avanashi	K. Marappa Gounder	INC	Karuppa Gounder	IND
165	Mettupalayam	D. Raghubadhi Devi	INC	Madhannan	IND
Nilgiris
166	Coonoor	J. Matha Gowder	INC	H. B. Ari Gowder	IND
167	Udagamandalam	B. K. Linga Gowder	INC	K. Bhojan	IND

== Government formation and aftermath ==
Although the election results were announced in the first week of April, the swearing-in ceremony took place on April 14. The Legislative Assembly convened later, on April 29.

At Fort St. George in Madras (now Chennai), a designated chamber existed for the Governor. From there, Governor A. J. John proceeded ceremonially to the council chamber to administer the oath of office. K. Kamaraj was sworn in as Chief Minister, along with six ministers M. Bhaktavatsalam, C. Subramaniam, M. A. Manickavelu, P. Kakkan, V. Ramaiah, and Lourdhammal Simon. The ceremony concluded within 15 minutes. R. Venkataraman took office separately on a later date before the Governor at Ootacamund.

At the time, political meetings and public gatherings were commonly held along the Marina Beach in Madras, at venues known by names such as Tilakar Thidal and Seerani Arangam, though such gatherings were later discontinued. Following the 1957 elections, thanksgiving meetings were organized by both the Congress and the Dravida Munnetra Kazhagam (DMK) at Marina Beach. The Congress meeting, held on April 8, was presided over by P. Kakkan.

Addressing the gathering, Kamaraj stated that an overwhelming victory for the Congress would be undesirable, emphasizing the need for a strong opposition in a democracy. He noted that although he had predicted around 150 seats, many had doubted it, and attributed his assessment to his understanding of the working classes. He stressed that governance should justify public trust and address common issues such as poverty and unemployment. At a meeting in Royapuram, the Dravida Munnetra Kazhagam elected C. N. Annadurai as Legislative Assembly leader and K. Anbazhagan as deputy leader, with M. Karunanidhi as chief whip. Annadurai urged party workers to uphold public trust and highlighted the importance of a responsible opposition in a democracy..

== Kamaraj's second cabinet ==
Kamaraj's council of ministers during his second tenure as chief minister (1 April 1957 – 1 March 1962)

Minister	Portfolios
K. Kamaraj	Chief Minister, Public, Planning and Development (including Local development Works, Women's Welfare, Community Projects and Rural Welfare), National Extension Scheme
M. Bhaktavatsalam	Home
C. Subramaniam	Finance
R. Venkataraman	Industries
M. A. Manickavelu Naicker	Revenue
P. Kakkan	Works
V. Ramaiah	Electricity
Lourdhammal Simon	Local Administration

== See also ==
- Elections in Tamil Nadu
- Legislature of Tamil Nadu
- Government of Tamil Nadu
