= M. Vedachalam =

- மு. வேதாசலம்

Member of the Tamil Nadu Legislative Assembly
- In office 1967–1976
- Preceded by: M. Mayandi Nadar
- Constituency: Washermanpet

Deputy Mayor of Chennai

Personal details
- Born: 26 June 1927 (age 98) Royapuram, Chennai, Tamil Nadu, India
- Party: Dravida Munnetra Kazhagam
- Occupation: Businessman

M. Vedachalam (born 26 June 1927) was an Indian politician and a former Member of the Legislative Assembly (MLA) of Tamil Nadu. A native of Royapuram, Chennai. He also served as the Deputy Mayor of Chennai Corporation. Representing the Dravida Munnetra Kazhagam (DMK), he contested and won the Tamil Nadu Legislative Assembly elections from the Washermanpet Assembly constituency in both 1967 and 1971.

== Electoral Performance ==
=== 1971 ===
1971 Tamil Nadu Legislative Assembly election: Washermanpet
Party	Candidate	Votes	%	±%
DMK	M. Vedachalam	38,989	54.04%	3.35%
INC	Ananthan	32,231	44.68%	4.60%
Independent	K V Manavala Naicker	923	1.28%	
Margin of victory		6,758	9.37%	−1.25%
Turnout		72,143	67.46%	−9.22%
Registered electors		1,09,476		
DMK hold		Swing	3.35%	

=== 1967 ===
1967 Madras Legislative Assembly election: Washermanpet
Party	Candidate	Votes	%	±%
DMK	M. Vedachalam	34,571	50.70%	15.33%
INC	M. Mayandi Nadar	27,329	40.08%	2.31%
Independent	R. Nayakar	6,072	8.90%	
Independent	K. Balakrishnan	218	0.32%	
Margin of victory		7,242	10.62%	8.22%
Turnout		68,190	76.68%	1.36%
Registered electors		91,287		
DMK gain from INC		Swing	12.93%	
