= K. Karunanithi =

Indian politician

Member of the Tamil Nadu Legislative Assembly
- Incumbent
- Assumed office 2026
- Preceded by: Kadambur Raju
- Constituency: Kovilpatti

Personal details
- Party: Dravida Munnetra Kazhagam
- Profession: Politician

K. Karunanithi is an Indian politician from Tamil Nadu. He is a member of the Tamil Nadu Legislative Assembly from Kovilpatti representing the Dravida Munnetra Kazhagam.

== Political career ==
Karunanithi won the Kovilpatti seat in the 2026 Tamil Nadu Legislative Assembly election as a candidate of the Dravida Munnetra Kazhagam. He received 61,643 votes and defeated S. Balasubramanian of Tamilaga Vettri Kazhagam by a margin of 843 votes.
