= Mayiladuthurai Assembly constituency =

One of the 234 State Legislative Assembly Constituencies in Tamil Nadu, in India

Coordinates: 11°06′07″N 79°34′47″E

Mayiladuthurai
- Constituency No. 161 for the Tamil Nadu Legislative Assembly

Constituency details
- Country: India
- Region: South India
- State: Tamil Nadu
- District: Mayiladuthurai
- Lok Sabha constituency: Mayiladuturai
- Established: 1951
- Total electors: 234,622
- Reservation: None

Member of Legislative Assembly
- 17th Tamil Nadu Legislative Assembly
- Incumbent Jamal Mohamed Younoos
- Party: INC
- Alliance: TVK+
- Elected year: 2026

Mayiladuthurai is a legislative assembly constituency in the Indian state of Tamil Nadu. Elections and winners from this constituency are listed below. Most successful parties: DMK and INC (five times). It is one of the 234 State Legislative Assembly Constituencies in Tamil Nadu, in India.

== History ==
N. Kittappa of the Dravida Munnetra Kazhagam served as member for Mayiladuthurai Assembly constituency for four consecutive terms from 1967 to 1984. The Indian National Congress has won the seat five times (1957, 1962, 1991, 2006, 2021), the Dravida Munnetra Kazhagam, five times (1967, 1971, 1977, 1980, 1989); the Anna Dravida Munnetra Kazhagam twice, Tamil Maanila Congress (Moopanar), Bharatiya Janata Party,and the Desiya Murpokku Dravida Kazhagam, once each.

== Members of Legislative Assembly ==
Year	Name	Political party
Madras State
1952	A. Veloo	Independent politician
1952	K. R. Sambandam	Independent politician
1957	G. Narayanasamy Naidu	Indian National Congress
1962	G. Narayanasamy Naidu	Indian National Congress
1967	N. Kittappa	Dravida Munnetra Kazhagam
Tamil Nadu
1971	N. Kittappa	Dravida Munnetra Kazhagam
1977	N. Kittappa	Dravida Munnetra Kazhagam
1980	N. Kittappa	Dravida Munnetra Kazhagam
1984^	K. Sathiyaseelan	Dravida Munnetra Kazhagam
1984	M. Thangamani	All India Anna Dravida Munnetra Kazhagam
1989	A. Senguttuvan	Dravida Munnetra Kazhagam
1991	M. M. S. Abul Hassan	Indian National Congress
1996	M. M. S. Abul Hassan	Tamil Maanila Congress (Moopanar)
2001	Jega Veerapandian	Bharatiya Janata Party
2006	S. Rajakumar	Indian National Congress
2011	R. Arulselvan	Desiya Murpokku Dravida Kazhagam
2016	V. Rathakrishnan	All India Anna Dravida Munnetra Kazhagam
2021	S. Rajakumar	Indian National Congress
2026	Jamal Md. Younoos	Indian National Congress

== Election results ==
Vote share of winning candidates
2026	36.09%
2021	42.17%
2016	42.02%
2011	44.64%
2006	46.27%
2001	49.51%
1996	58.50%
1991	55.34%
1989	42.73%
1984	51.87%
1980	48.89%
1977	39.34%
1971	50.69%
1967	51.21%
1962	51.10%
1957	30.81%
1952	28.23%

=== 2026 ===
2026 Tamil Nadu Legislative Assembly election: Mayiladuthurai
Party	Candidate	Votes	%	±%
INC	Jamal Mohamed Younoos.Y.N	68,011	36.09	▼6.08
PMK	Palanisamy.A M.Com.	57,166	30.33	▼10.27
TVK	Haroon Rasheed.S.S	52,538	27.88	New
NTK	Kasiraman.K	6,886	3.65	▼3.90
NOTA	NOTA	474	0.25	▼0.36
Margin of victory		10,845	5.76	▲4.19
Turnout		1,88,461	80.33	▲9.33
Registered electors		2,34,622		▼11,365
INC hold		Swing	▼6.08	

=== 2021 ===
2021 Tamil Nadu Legislative Assembly election: Mayiladuthurai
Party	Candidate	Votes	%	±%
INC	S. Rajakumar	73,642	42.17	New
PMK	A. Palanisamy	70,900	40.60	+32.83
NTK	K. Kasiraman	13,186	7.55	+6.56
AMMK	R. K. Anbarasan Komal	7,282	4.17	New
MNM	N. Ravichandran	5,933	3.40	New
NOTA	NOTA	1,067	0.61	−0.39
Margin of victory		2,742	1.57	−1.26
Turnout		174,640	71.00	−1.41
Rejected ballots		129	0.07	
Registered electors		245,987		
INC gain from AIADMK		Swing	0.15	

=== 2016 ===
2016 Tamil Nadu Legislative Assembly election: Mayiladuthurai
Party	Candidate	Votes	%	±%
AIADMK	V. Rathakrishnan	70,949	42.02	New
DMK	K. Anbazhagan	66,171	39.19	New
PMK	A. Ayyappan	13,115	7.77	New
DMDK	R. Arulselvan	12,294	7.28	−37.36
BJP	C. Muthukumarasamy	1,926	1.14	−1.82
NOTA	NOTA	1,688	1.00	New
NTK	J. Shahul Hameed	1,672	0.99	New
Margin of victory		4,778	2.83	0.70
Turnout		168,856	72.40	−4.28
Registered electors		233,224		
AIADMK gain from DMDK		Swing	-2.63	

=== 2011 ===
2011 Tamil Nadu Legislative Assembly election: Mayiladuthurai
Party	Candidate	Votes	%	±%
DMDK	R. Arulselvan	63,326	44.64	+42.67
INC	S. Rajakumar	60,309	42.52	−3.75
Independent	B. Manimaran	6,023	4.25	New
BJP	G. Sethuraman	4,202	2.96	+1.81
Independent	S. Mathiyazhagan	1,678	1.18	New
IJK	S. K. Jayaraman	1,002	0.71	New
Independent	T. Murugan	963	0.68	New
BSP	M. Maithili	790	0.56	+0.02
Margin of victory		3,017	2.13	0.76
Turnout		184,990	76.68	4.01
Registered electors		141,847		
DMDK gain from INC		Swing	-1.62	

=== 2006 ===
2006 Tamil Nadu Legislative Assembly election: Mayuram
Party	Candidate	Votes	%	±%
INC	S. Rajakumar	53,490	46.27	New
MDMK	M. Mahalingam	51,912	44.90	New
Independent	T. Rajendar	4,346	3.76	New
DMDK	P. Thavamani	2,277	1.97	New
BJP	P. Vasudevan	1,327	1.15	−48.36
BSP	P. Muthusamy	624	0.54	New
Margin of victory		1,578	1.36	−1.00
Turnout		115,612	72.67	12.14
Registered electors		159,101		
INC gain from BJP		Swing	-3.24	

=== 2001 ===
2001 Tamil Nadu Legislative Assembly election: Mayuram
Party	Candidate	Votes	%	±%
BJP	Jega Veerapandian	51,303	49.51	New
AIADMK	R. Selvaraj	48,851	47.14	New
Independent	R. Mathanmohan	1,434	1.38	New
Independent	Pon. Prabaakaran	587	0.57	New
Margin of victory		2,452	2.37	−31.08
Turnout		103,626	60.53	−10.47
Registered electors		171,477		
BJP gain from TMC(M)		Swing	-8.99	

=== 1996 ===
1996 Tamil Nadu Legislative Assembly election: Mayuram
Party	Candidate	Votes	%	±%
TMC(M)	M. M. S. Abul Hassan	60,522	58.50	New
INC	Rama Chidambaram	25,918	25.05	−30.29
PMK	K. Ramakrishnan	8,768	8.47	New
MDMK	M. Mahalingam	4,614	4.46	New
Independent	R. Marimuthu	1,103	1.07	New
Independent	V. Kubendhran	697	0.67	New
Margin of victory		34,604	33.45	9.79
Turnout		103,459	71.00	1.78
Registered electors		151,914		
TMC(M) gain from INC		Swing	3.16	

=== 1991 ===
1991 Tamil Nadu Legislative Assembly election: Mayuram
Party	Candidate	Votes	%	±%
INC	M. M. S. Abul Hassan	54,516	55.34	+27.43
DMK	A. Senguttivan	31,208	31.68	−11.05
PMK	K. Periyasamy	11,779	11.96	New
{{{party}}}	{{{candidate}}}	{{{votes}}}	{{{percentage}}}	New
Margin of victory		23,308	23.66	8.84
Turnout		98,510	69.22	2.94
Registered electors		146,043		
INC gain from DMK		Swing	12.61	

=== 1989 ===
1989 Tamil Nadu Legislative Assembly election: Mayuram
Party	Candidate	Votes	%	±%
DMK	A. Senguttivan	36,793	42.73	−4.55
INC	M. M. S. Abul Hassan	24,034	27.91	New
AIADMK	S. R. G. Rajaraman	14,040	16.30	−35.56
Independent	P. Muthusamy	5,325	6.18	New
AIADMK	M. Thangamani	3,791	4.40	−47.46
BJP	V. Subbarayan	1,777	2.06	New
Margin of victory		12,759	14.82	10.23
Turnout		86,110	66.28	−13.43
Registered electors		131,627		
DMK gain from AIADMK		Swing	-9.14	

=== 1984 ===
1984 Tamil Nadu Legislative Assembly election: Mayuram
Party	Candidate	Votes	%	±%
AIADMK	M. Thangamani	47,119	51.87	+3.84
DMK	K. Satiyaseelan	42,948	47.28	−1.62
Margin of victory		4,171	4.59	3.72
Turnout		90,846	79.71	8.71
Registered electors		116,888		
AIADMK gain from DMK		Swing	2.97	

=== 1980 ===
1980 Tamil Nadu Legislative Assembly election: Mayuram
Party	Candidate	Votes	%	±%
DMK	N. Kittappa	37,671	48.89	+9.56
AIADMK	Bala Velayutham	37,001	48.03	+24.7
Independent	K. P. Anbalagan	1,724	2.24	New
Independent	S. Santhanam	649	0.84	New
Margin of victory		670	0.87	−10.46
Turnout		77,045	70.99	−0.97
Registered electors		109,869		
DMK hold		Swing	9.56	

=== 1977 ===
1977 Tamil Nadu Legislative Assembly election: Mayuram
Party	Candidate	Votes	%	±%
DMK	N. Kittappa	29,829	39.34	−11.35
INC	M. M. S. Abul Hassan	21,237	28.01	−21.3
AIADMK	Balavelayatham	17,687	23.33	New
JP	S. Somasundaram	7,071	9.33	New
Margin of victory		8,592	11.33	9.95
Turnout		75,824	71.96	−6.64
Registered electors		106,786		
DMK hold		Swing	-11.35	

=== 1971 ===
1971 Tamil Nadu Legislative Assembly election: Mayuram
Party	Candidate	Votes	%	±%
DMK	N. Kittappa	37,311	50.69	−0.52
INC	M. R. Krishnappa	36,292	49.31	+3.17
Margin of victory		1,019	1.38	−3.69
Turnout		73,603	78.60	−2.37
Registered electors		95,836		
DMK hold		Swing	-0.52	

=== 1967 ===
1967 Madras Legislative Assembly election: Mayuram
Party	Candidate	Votes	%	±%
DMK	N. Kittappa	33,721	51.21	+16.72
INC	G. N. Naidu	30,379	46.14	−4.96
Independent	Lakshmanan	938	1.42	New
Independent	P. Balakrishnan	807	1.23	New
Margin of victory		3,342	5.08	−11.53
Turnout		65,845	80.97	−2.12
Registered electors		84,176		
DMK gain from INC		Swing	0.11	

=== 1962 ===
1962 Madras Legislative Assembly election: Mayuram
Party	Candidate	Votes	%	±%
INC	G. Narayanasamy Naidu	37,362	51.10	+20.29
DMK	Palanisamy Nadar	25,220	34.49	New
CPI	Gnanasambandan	8,163	11.16	−1.67
SWA	Angappan	2,373	3.25	New
Margin of victory		12,142	16.61	2.32
Turnout		73,118	83.09	−4.10
Registered electors		91,209		
INC hold		Swing	20.29	

=== 1957 ===
1957 Madras Legislative Assembly election: Mayuram
Party	Candidate	Votes	%	±%
INC	G. Narayanasamy Naidu	49,188	30.81	17.31
CPI	M. Kathamuthu	20,498	12.84	
Independent	K. Kriahnamoorthi	12,061	7.55	
Independent	B. Venkatakriahnan	9,564	5.99	
Independent	G. Paramananthan	8,222	5.15	
Independent	A. Veloo (SC)	4,137	2.59	
Independent	T. Ramu (SC)	2,232	1.40	
Margin of victory		28,290	17.97	
Turnout		1,59,660	87.19	−23.83
Registered electors		1,83,122		
INC gain from Independent		Swing	2.58	

=== 1952 ===
1952 Madras Legislative Assembly election: Mayuram
Party	Candidate	Votes	%	±%
Independent	K. R. Sambandan	47,323	28.23	
INC	K. Pitchai	22,623	13.50	13.50
Independent	M. S. Ponnuswami Iyer	17,105	10.20	
CPI	N. Kataramuthu	12,251	7.31	
RPI	I. B. S. Mani	9,180	5.48	
Independent	Sidha Sankarananda	3,649	2.18	
Margin of victory		24,700	14.27	
Turnout		1,67,623	111.02	
Registered electors		1,50,988		
Independent win (new seat)				
