= V. Rathakrishnan =

Member-Tamil Nadu Legislative Assembly
- In office 2016–2021
- Preceded by: R. Arulselvan
- Succeeded by: S. Rajakumar
- Constituency: Mayiladuthurai

Personal details
- Born: 19 June 1964 Anathandavapuram
- Party: All India Anna Dravida Munnetra Kazhagam
- Profession: Farmer

V. Rathakrishnan is an Indian politician and a former Member of the Tamil Nadu Legislative Assembly (MLA). Rathakrishnan hails from Anathandavapuram in Mayiladuthurai district. Rathakrishnan, who has completed higher secondary school education (High School/Pre-University), belongs to the All India Anna Dravida Munnetra Kazhagam (AIADMK) party. He contested and won the Mayiladuthurai Assembly constituency in the 2016 Tamil Nadu Legislative Assembly election, becoming an MLA.

== Electoral Performance ==
=== 2016 ===
2016 Tamil Nadu Legislative Assembly election: Mayiladuthurai
Party	Candidate	Votes	%	±%
AIADMK	V. Rathakrishnan	70,949	42.02%	New
DMK	K. Anbazhagan	66,171	39.19%	New
PMK	A. Ayyappan	13,115	7.77%	New
DMDK	R. Arulselvan	12,294	7.28%	−37.36
BJP	C. Muthukumarasamy	1,926	1.14%	−1.82
NOTA	NOTA	1,688	1.00%	New
NTK	J. Shahul Hameed	1,672	0.99%	New
Margin of victory		4,778	2.83%	0.70%
Turnout		168,856	72.40%	−4.28%
Registered electors		233,224		
AIADMK gain from DMDK		Swing	-2.63%	
