= A. Marimuthu =

A. Marimuthu may refer to the following Indian politicians:

- A. Marimuthu (Aduthurai politician), INC, Tamil Nadu MLA for Aduthurai
- A. Marimuthu (Vanur MLA), DMK, Tamil Nadu MLA for Vanur

== See also ==
- A. R. Marimuthu, PSP, Tamil Nadu MLA for Adirampattinam
