= Rangasamy =

Rangasamy is a surname. Notable people with the surname include:

- N. Rangaswamy (also known as N. Rangasamy; born 1950), Indian politician
- R. Rangasamy, Indian politician
- S. R. Janakiraman (born S. Rangasamy Janakiraman; 1928), Indian vocalist
