= S. Rajendran (CPI politician) =

Indian politician

S. Rajendran is a former MLA from Kovilpatti (state assembly constituency) in Tamil Nadu, India, elected in Assembly election 2001.

== Assembly election 2001 ==
2001 Tamil Nadu Legislative Assembly election: Kovilpatti
Party	Candidate	Votes	%	±%
CPI	S. Rajendran	45,796	40.27	+5.08
DMK	K. Rajaram	36,757	32.32	New
MDMK	K. Vishvamithran	27,809	24.45	−4.04
Majority		9,039	7.95	+1.24
Turnout		1,13,785	58.69	−7.16
CPI hold		Swing	+5.08	
