= Kovilpatti Assembly constituency =

One of the 234 State Legislative Assembly Constituencies in Tamil Nadu

Coordinates: 9°10′13.01″N 77°51′07.34″E

Kovilpatti
- Constituency No. 218 for the Tamil Nadu Legislative Assembly
- Area of Kovilpatti State Assembly Constituency

Constituency details
- Country: India
- Region: South India
- State: Tamil Nadu
- District: Thoothukudi
- Lok Sabha constituency: Thoothukkudi
- Established: 1951
- Total electors: 240,017
- Reservation: None

Member of Legislative Assembly
- 17th Tamil Nadu Legislative Assembly
- Incumbent K. Karunanithi
- Party: DMK
- Alliance: SPA
- Elected year: 2026

Kovilpatti is one of the 234 state legislative assembly constituencies in Tamil Nadu in southern India. It is also one of the six state legislative assembly constituencies included in Thoothukkudi Lok Sabha constituency. It is one of the oldest assembly segments in Tamil Nadu, having existed since independence.

== Members of Legislative Assembly ==
Year	Member	Political party
1952	Ramaswamy	Indian National Congress
1957	V. Suppaya Naicker	Independent
1962	N. V. Venu Gopala Krishnasami	Indian National Congress
1967	S. Alagarsamy	Communist Party of India
1971	S. Alagarsamy	Communist Party of India
1977	S. Alagarsamy	Communist Party of India
1980	S. Alagarsamy	Communist Party of India
1984	R. Rangasamy	Indian National Congress
1989	S. Alagarsamy	Communist Party of India
1991	R. Shyamala	All India Anna Dravida Munnetra Kazhagam
2001	L. Ayyalusamy	Communist Party of India
2001	S. Rajendran	Communist Party of India
2006	L. Radhakrishnan	All India Anna Dravida Munnetra Kazhagam
2011	Kadambur C. Raju	All India Anna Dravida Munnetra Kazhagam
2016	Kadambur C. Raju	All India Anna Dravida Munnetra Kazhagam
2021	Kadambur C. Raju	All India Anna Dravida Munnetra Kazhagam
2026	K. Karunanithi	Dravida Munnetra Kazhagam

== Election results ==
Vote share of winning candidates
2026	31.74%
2021	37.89%
2016	38.96%
2011	55.85%
2006	46.62%
2001	40.27%
1996	35.19%
1991	61.81%
1989	35.34%
1984	55.75%
1980	51.37%
1977	32.75%
1971	62.16%
1967	55.02%
1962	36.22%
1957	31.78%
1952	64.67%

=== 2026 ===
2026 Tamil Nadu Legislative Assembly election: Kovilpatti
Party	Candidate	Votes	%	±%
DMK	Karunanithi. K	61,643	31.74	
TVK	Balasubramanian S	60,800	31.3	New
AIADMK	Kadambur Raju C	53,014	27.29	▼10.84
NTK	Pandi P	11,919	6.14	▲1.02
Independent	Athikumar Kudumbar B	2,992	1.54	
NOTA	NOTA	593	0.31	
Margin of victory		843		
Turnout		194,232		
Rejected ballots				
Registered electors		240,017		
DMK gain from AIADMK		Swing		

=== 2021 ===
2021 Tamil Nadu Legislative Assembly election: Kovilpatti
Party	Candidate	Votes	%	±%
AIADMK	Kadambur Raju	68,556	38.13%	−0.83
AMMK	T. T. V. Dhinakaran	56,153	31.23%	New
CPI(M)	K. Srinivasan	37,380	20.79%	New
NTK	M. Gomathi	9,213	5.12%	+3.87
MNM	K. Kathiravan	3,667	2.04%	New
NOTA	NOTA	1,124	0.63%	−0.79
Margin of victory		12,403	6.90%	6.64%
Turnout		1,79,804	67.62%	0.92%
Rejected ballots		576	0.32%	
Registered electors		2,65,915		
AIADMK hold		Swing	-0.83%	

=== 2016 ===
2016 Tamil Nadu Legislative Assembly election: Kovilpatti
Party	Candidate	Votes	%	±%
AIADMK	Kadambur Raju	64,514	38.96%	−16.89
DMK	A. Subramanian	64,086	38.70%	New
MDMK	Vinayaka Ramesh	28,512	17.22%	New
NOTA	NOTA	2,350	1.42%	New
NTK	T. Muthu Mari	2,070	1.25%	New
PMK	G. Ramachandiran	1,075	0.65%	−34.94
Margin of victory		428	0.26%	−20.00%
Turnout		1,65,607	66.70%	−5.48%
Registered electors		2,48,279		
AIADMK hold		Swing	-16.89%	

=== 2011 ===
2011 Tamil Nadu Legislative Assembly election: Kovilpatti
Party	Candidate	Votes	%	±%
AIADMK	Kadambur Raju	73,007	55.85%	+9.24
PMK	G. Ramachandran	46,527	35.59%	New
Independent	P. Mariappan	2,685	2.05%	New
BJP	V. Rengarajan	2,186	1.67%	+1.03
Independent	E. Visuvasam	1,232	0.94%	New
BSP	S. Arumairaj	1,107	0.85%	−1.62
Independent	V. Kennady	1,068	0.82%	New
Independent	P. Ramasamy	679	0.52%	New
Margin of victory		26,480	20.26%	9.48%
Turnout		1,30,723	72.18%	7.46%
Registered electors		1,81,097		
AIADMK hold		Swing	9.24%	

=== 2006 ===
2006 Tamil Nadu Legislative Assembly election: Kovilpatti
Party	Candidate	Votes	%	±%
AIADMK	L. Radhakrishnan	53,354	46.61%	New
CPI	S. Rajendran	41,015	35.83%	−4.44
DMDK	T. Srinivasa Raghavan	11,633	10.16%	New
PT	K. Kovilselvan	2,827	2.47%	New
AIFB	S. Chelladurai	2,560	2.24%	New
Independent	V. Viswanathan	1,201	1.05%	New
BJP	G. Somasundaram	733	0.64%	New
Margin of victory		12,339	10.78%	2.83%
Turnout		1,14,478	64.73%	6.03%
Registered electors		1,76,858		
AIADMK gain from CPI		Swing	6.34%	

=== 2001 ===
2001 Tamil Nadu Legislative Assembly election: Kovilpatti
Party	Candidate	Votes	%	±%
CPI	S. Rajendran	45,796	40.27%	+5.08
DMK	K. Rajaram	36,757	32.32%	New
MDMK	K. Vishvamithran	27,809	24.45%	−4.03
Independent	M. Mariappan	1,881	1.65%	New
Independent	R. Ayyalusamy	757	0.67%	New
TLK	K. G. Muthurajan	726	0.64%	New
Margin of victory		9,039	7.95%	1.25%
Turnout		1,13,726	58.69%	−7.15%
Registered electors		1,93,861		
CPI hold		Swing	5.08%	

=== 1996 ===
1996 Tamil Nadu Legislative Assembly election: Kovilpatti
Party	Candidate	Votes	%	±%
CPI	L. Ayyalusamy	39,315	35.19%	+3.21
MDMK	K. S. Radhakrishnan	31,828	28.49%	New
AIADMK	L. Radhakrishnan	31,168	27.90%	−33.92
JP	V. R. Veeraragavan	5,321	4.76%	New
BJP	V. Rengaraja	806	0.72%	New
Margin of victory		7,487	6.70%	−23.13%
Turnout		1,11,727	65.85%	5.87%
Registered electors		1,75,222		
CPI gain from AIADMK		Swing	-26.62%	

=== 1991 ===
1991 Tamil Nadu Legislative Assembly election: Kovilpatti
Party	Candidate	Votes	%	±%
AIADMK	R. Shyamala	58,535	61.81%	New
CPI	L. Ayyalusamy	30,284	31.98%	−3.36
PMK	P. Krishnamoorthy	4,032	4.26%	New
Margin of victory		28,251	29.83%	26.52%
Turnout		94,698	59.98%	−10.36%
Registered electors		1,61,982		
AIADMK gain from CPI		Swing	26.48%	

=== 1989 ===
1989 Tamil Nadu Legislative Assembly election: Kovilpatti
Party	Candidate	Votes	%	±%
CPI	S. Alagarsamy	35,008	35.34%	+0.72
DMK	S. Radhakrishnan	31,724	32.02%	New
Independent	A. Palpandian	13,981	14.11%	New
Independent	S. Dharmar	6,462	6.52%	New
Independent	M. S. Iyyadurai	4,759	4.80%	New
Independent	V. Anandasamy	3,263	3.29%	New
India Farmers and Tailers Party	R. P. Ramasamy	2,742	2.77%	New
Margin of victory		3,284	3.31%	−17.82%
Turnout		99,069	70.34%	−1.44%
Registered electors		1,43,671		
CPI gain from INC		Swing	-20.41%	

=== 1984 ===
1984 Tamil Nadu Legislative Assembly election: Kovilpatti
Party	Candidate	Votes	%	±%
INC	R. Rangasamy	45,623	55.75%	+15.64
CPI	S. Alagarsamy	28,327	34.61%	−16.76
Independent	P. Seenirasu	4,655	5.69%	New
Independent	V. Paulraj	977	1.19%	New
Independent	R. Paramasivam	715	0.87%	New
Independent	S. Perumalsamy	633	0.77%	New
Independent	T. N. P. Raju	627	0.77%	New
Margin of victory		17,296	21.13%	9.87%
Turnout		81,840	71.78%	3.24%
Registered electors		1,20,666		
INC gain from CPI		Swing	4.37%	

=== 1980 ===
1980 Tamil Nadu Legislative Assembly election: Kovilpatti
Party	Candidate	Votes	%	±%
CPI	S. Alagarsamy	39,442	51.37%	+18.63
INC	V. Jeyalakshmi	30,792	40.11%	New
JP	S. Kalidas	6,281	8.18%	New
Margin of victory		8,650	11.27%	10.68%
Turnout		76,777	68.54%	5.48%
Registered electors		1,13,218		
CPI hold		Swing	18.63%	

=== 1977 ===
1977 Tamil Nadu Legislative Assembly election: Kovilpatti
Party	Candidate	Votes	%	±%
CPI	S. Alagarsamy	21,985	32.75%	−29.42
AIADMK	P. Seeniraj	21,588	32.15%	New
Margin of victory		397	0.59%	−23.73%
Turnout		67,140	63.06%	−9.03%
Registered electors		1,07,794		
CPI hold		Swing	-29.42%	

=== 1971 ===
1971 Tamil Nadu Legislative Assembly election: Kovilpatti
Party	Candidate	Votes	%	±%
CPI	S. Alagarsamy	38,844	62.16%	+7.14
INC	L. Subba Naicker	23,646	37.84%	+0.04
Margin of victory		15,198	24.32%	7.10%
Turnout		62,490	72.09%	−2.89%
Registered electors		92,524		
CPI hold		Swing	7.14%	

=== 1967 ===
1967 Madras Legislative Assembly election: Kovilpatti
Party	Candidate	Votes	%	±%
CPI	S. Alagarsamy	33,311	55.02%	+29.87
INC	V. O. C. A. Pillai	22,885	37.80%	+1.58
Independent	R. K. Thevar	3,709	6.13%	New
Independent	R. Chairman	641	1.06%	New
Margin of victory		10,426	17.22%	10.52%
Turnout		60,546	74.98%	−2.49%
Registered electors		84,101		
CPI gain from INC		Swing	18.80%	

=== 1962 ===
1962 Madras Legislative Assembly election: Kovilpatti
Party	Candidate	Votes	%	±%
INC	N. V. Venugopalakrishnasami	22,158	36.22%	+6.38
SWA	R. S. Appasami	18,059	29.52%	New
CPI	S. Alagarsamy	15,387	25.15%	−2.39
DMK	M. Periasami	5,030	8.22%	New
Independent	K. Venkataram Naidu	543	0.89%	New
Margin of victory		4,099	6.70%	4.76%
Turnout		61,177	77.47%	31.88%
Registered electors		81,603		
INC gain from Independent		Swing	4.44%	

=== 1957 ===
1957 Madras Legislative Assembly election: Kovilpatti
Party	Candidate	Votes	%	±%
Independent	V. Subbaiah Naicker	11,425	31.78%	New
INC	Selvaraj	10,726	29.84%	−34.83
CPI	S. Alagarsamy	9,901	27.54%	New
Independent	Ponnusamy	3,898	10.84%	New
Margin of victory		699	1.94%	−41.94%
Turnout		35,950	45.60%	−7.15%
Registered electors		78,841		
Independent gain from INC		Swing	-32.89%	

=== 1952 ===
1952 Madras Legislative Assembly election: Kovilpatti
Party	Candidate	Votes	%	±%
INC	Ramasamy	25,282	64.67%	New
Independent	Shanmugham	8,124	20.78%	New
Socialist Party (India)	Subbiah	4,370	11.18%	New
KMPP	Perumal	1,319	3.37%	New
Margin of victory		17,158	43.89%	
Turnout		39,095	52.75%	
Registered electors		74,113		
INC win (new seat)				
