= Jamal Mohamed Younoos =

Indian politician

Member of the Tamil Nadu Legislative Assembly
- Incumbent
- Assumed office 2026
- Preceded by: S. Rajakumar
- Constituency: Mayiladuthurai

Personal details
- Born: 22 April 1987 (age 39) Thanjavur, Tamil Nadu, India
- Party: Indian National Congress
- Profession: Politician

Jamal Mohamed Younoos is an Indian politician from Tamil Nadu. He is a member of the Tamil Nadu Legislative Assembly from Mayiladuthurai representing the Indian National Congress.

== Political career ==
Younoos won the Mayiladuthurai seat in the 2026 Tamil Nadu Legislative Assembly election as a candidate of the Indian National Congress. He received 67,189 votes and defeated A. M. Palanisamy of the Pattali Makkal Katchi by a margin of 10,845 votes.
