= D. S. Adhimoolam =

Indian politician

Member of the Madras State Assembly
- In office 1967–1972
- Preceded by: S. Chellapandian
- Constituency: Cheranmadevi

Personal details
- Party: Swatantra Party

D. S. Adhimoolam was an Indian politician and a former Member of the Legislative Assembly of Tamil Nadu. He was elected to the Tamil Nadu Legislative Assembly as an Independent candidate from the Kadayam constituency in 1957 election and as a Swatantra Party candidate from the Cheranmadevi constituency in the 1967 election.
