= T. Palur Assembly constituency =

Coordinates: 11.10°N 79.37°E

T. Palur
- Former constituency for the Tamil Nadu Legislative Assembly

Constituency details
- Country: India
- Region: South India
- State: Tamil Nadu
- District: Ariyalur
- Established: 1957
- Abolished: 1967
- Total electors: 88,957
- Reservation: None

T. Palur was former constituency in the Tamil Nadu Legislative Assembly of Tamil Nadu, a southern state of India. It was in Ariyalur district.

== Members of the Legislative Assembly ==
Year	Winner	Party
Madras State
1962	S. Ramasami	Dravida Munnetra Kazhagam
1957	T. K. Subbiah	Indian National Congress

== Election results ==
Vote share of winning candidates
1962	60.06%
1957	43.37%

=== 1962 ===
1962 Madras Legislative Assembly election: T. Palur
Party	Candidate	Votes	%	±%
DMK	S. Ramasami	40,593	60.06%	
INC	T. K. Subbiah	22,969	33.98%	−9.39%
SWA	G. Rathinam	2,540	3.76%	
Independent	K. M. S. Alagesa Pillai	1,484	2.20%	
Margin of victory		17,624	26.08%	21.32%
Turnout		67,586	79.66%	30.02%
Registered electors		88,957		
DMK gain from INC		Swing	16.69%	

=== 1957 ===
1957 Madras Legislative Assembly election: T. Palur
Party	Candidate	Votes	%	±%
INC	T. K. Subbiah	17,522	43.37%	
Independent	Ramasamy	15,602	38.62%	
Independent	Chinnasamy	7,276	18.01%	
Margin of victory		1,920	4.75%	
Turnout		40,400	49.64%	
Registered electors		81,385		
INC win (new seat)				
