= Uthamapalayam Assembly constituency =

Coordinates: 9.81°N 77.33°E

Uthamapalayam
- Former constituency for the Tamil Nadu Legislative Assembly

Constituency details
- Country: India
- Region: South India
- State: Tamil Nadu
- District: Theni
- Established: 1951
- Abolished: 1962
- Total electors: 91,106
- Reservation: None

Uthamapalayam is a former state assembly constituency in Theni district in Tamil Nadu, India.

== Members of the Legislative Assembly ==
Year	Winner	Party
Madras State
1952	A. S. Subbaraj	Indian National Congress
1957	K. Pandiaraj	Indian National Congress
1962	M. Rajangam	Dravida Munnetra Kazhagam

== Election results ==
Vote share of winning candidates
1962	42.99%
1957	53.60%
1952	48.56%

=== 1962 ===
1962 Madras Legislative Assembly election: Uthamapalayam
Party	Candidate	Votes	%	±%
DMK	M. Rajangam	28,907	42.99%	
INC	K. S. Rajagopal	27,368	40.70%	−12.91%
CPI	S. Venkitasamy Gowder	9,674	14.39%	
SWA	K. V. Rengasamy Gowder	1,297	1.93%	
Margin of victory		1,539	2.29%	−8.77%
Turnout		67,246	75.97%	15.86%
Registered electors		91,106		
DMK gain from INC		Swing	-10.62%	

=== 1957 ===
1957 Madras Legislative Assembly election: Uthamapalayam
Party	Candidate	Votes	%	±%
INC	K. Pandiaraj	30,559	53.60%	5.04%
Independent	P. T. Rajan	24,256	42.55%	
Independent	S. N. Ponnusamy	2,193	3.85%	
Margin of victory		6,303	11.06%	−5.55%
Turnout		57,008	60.11%	−16.35%
Registered electors		94,840		
INC hold		Swing	5.04%	

=== 1952 ===
1952 Madras Legislative Assembly election: Uthamapalayam
Party	Candidate	Votes	%	±%
INC	A. S. Subbaraj	25,939	48.56%	48.56%
Socialist Party (India)	Muthiah	17,069	31.96%	
Independent	Sonaimuthu	8,836	16.54%	
KMPP	Ramaswami Servai	1,570	2.94%	
Margin of victory		8,870	16.61%	
Turnout		53,414	76.46%	
Registered electors		69,858		
INC win (new seat)				
