= Vadamadurai Assembly constituency =

Defunct state assembly constituency in Dindigul district in Tamil Nadu, India

Coordinates: 10.44°N 78.10°E

Vadamadurai
- Former constituency for the Tamil Nadu Legislative Assembly

Constituency details
- Country: India
- Region: South India
- State: Tamil Nadu
- District: Dindigul
- Lok Sabha constituency: Erode
- Established: 1951
- Abolished: 1971
- Total electors: 92,205
- Reservation: None

Vadamadurai is a state assembly constituency in Dindigul district in Tamil Nadu, India.

== Members of the Legislative Assembly ==
Year	Winner	Party
Madras State
1967	P. T. Naicker	Indian National Congress
1962	M. Maruthanayagam Pillai	Indian National Congress
1957	T. Thirumalaimuthu Veerasakkayya Tiruvenkatasamy Naicker	Independent politician
1952	Chinaswamy Naidu	Indian National Congress
Tamil Nadu
1971	Nagarajan. K	Dravida Munnetra Kazhagam

== Election results ==
Vote share of winning candidates
1971	58.75%
1967	49.11%
1962	57.97%
1957	44.00%
1952	62.97%

=== 1971 ===
1971 Tamil Nadu Legislative Assembly election: Vadamadurai
Party	Candidate	Votes	%	±%
DMK	Nagarajan. K	35,989	58.75%	12.62%
INC	Rajendran. S	25,270	41.25%	−7.86%
Margin of victory		10,719	17.50%	14.51%
Turnout		61,259	70.55%	−3.39%
Registered electors		92,205		
DMK gain from INC		Swing	9.64%	

=== 1967 ===
1967 Madras Legislative Assembly election: Vadamadurai
Party	Candidate	Votes	%	±%
INC	P.Thambi Naicker	30,507	49.11%	−8.86%
DMK	V. S. Lakshmanan	28,651	46.13%	7.19%
Independent	S. P. Pillai	1,656	2.67%	
Independent	K. A. Gounder	1,301	2.09%	
Margin of victory		1,856	2.99%	−16.05%
Turnout		62,115	73.94%	4.02%
Registered electors		88,792		
INC hold		Swing	-8.86%	

=== 1962 ===
1962 Madras Legislative Assembly election: Vadamadurai
Party	Candidate	Votes	%	±%
INC	M. Maruthanayagam Pillai	27,975	57.97%	19.38%
DMK	A. Nallathambi	18,788	38.93%	
Independent	N. Ramarajan	1,495	3.10%	
Margin of victory		9,187	19.04%	13.63%
Turnout		48,258	69.92%	25.09%
Registered electors		71,585		
INC gain from Independent		Swing	13.97%	

=== 1957 ===
1957 Madras Legislative Assembly election: Vadamadurai
Party	Candidate	Votes	%	±%
Independent	T. Thirumalaimuthu Veerasakkayya Tiruvenkatasamy Naicker	13,996	44.00%	
INC	S. Chinnasamy Naidu	12,275	38.59%	−24.37%
PSP	R. Gopalakrishna Reddiar	3,707	11.65%	
Independent	T. Ramalingam	1,830	5.75%	
Margin of victory		1,721	5.41%	−34.84%
Turnout		31,808	44.83%	−1.41%
Registered electors		70,949		
Independent gain from INC		Swing	-18.96%	

=== 1952 ===
1952 Madras Legislative Assembly election: Vadamadurai
Party	Candidate	Votes	%	±%
INC	Chinaswamy Naidu	22,745	62.97%	62.97%
Socialist Party (India)	Srinivasan	8,205	22.71%	
KMPP	P. Venkataramadoss	5,173	14.32%	
Margin of victory		14,540	40.25%	
Turnout		36,123	46.24%	
Registered electors		78,116		
INC win (new seat)				
