= A. Marimuthu (Aduthurai politician) =

Indian politician

Member of the Madras State Legislative Assembly
- In office 1967–1971
- Constituency: Aduthurai

Personal details
- Party: Indian National Congress

A. Marimuthu was an Indian politician and former Member of the Legislative Assembly of Tamil Nadu. He was elected to the Tamil Nadu Legislative Assembly as an Indian National Congress candidate from Aduthurai Assembly constituency in the 1967 Tamil Nadu state assembly election.

== Electoral performance ==
Election	Constituency	Political party	Result	Vote %	Opposition			Ref
Election	Constituency	Political party	Result	Vote %	Candidate	Political party	Vote %	Ref
1967	Aduthurai	INC	Won	48.52%	M. G. Mani	DMK	42.45%	
1971	Aduthurai	INC	Lost	48.74%	K. Rajamanickam	DMK	51.26%	
