= Kadayam Assembly constituency =

Coordinates: 8.82°N 77.37°E

Kadayam
- Former constituency for the Tamil Nadu Legislative Assembly

Constituency details
- Country: India
- Region: South India
- State: Tamil Nadu
- District: Tenkasi
- Established: 1957
- Abolished: 1962
- Total electors: 93,773
- Reservation: None

Kadayam was former state assembly constituency in Tenkasi district, Tamil Nadu, India. It exists from 1957 to 1962.

== Members of the Legislative Assembly ==
Year	Winner	Party
1962	A. B. Balagan	Indian National Congress
1957	D. S. Athimoolam	Independent politician

== Election results ==
Vote share of winning candidates
1962	67.75%
1957	56.34%

=== 1962 ===
1962 Madras Legislative Assembly election: Kadayam
Party	Candidate	Votes	%	±%
INC	A. B. Balagan	46,160	67.75%	27.74%
CPI	R. V. Ananthakrishnan	13,821	20.28%	
SWA	E. J. Thomas	8,154	11.97%	
Margin of victory		32,339	47.46%	31.13%
Turnout		68,135	75.11%	9.12%
Registered electors		93,773		
INC gain from Independent		Swing	11.41%	

=== 1957 ===
1957 Madras Legislative Assembly election: Kadayam
Party	Candidate	Votes	%	±%
Independent	D. S. Athimoolam	33,097	56.34%	
INC	A. Balagan	23,503	40.01%	
Independent	S. Thirumalai	2,147	3.65%	
Margin of victory		9,594	16.33%	
Turnout		58,747	65.99%	
Registered electors		89,030		
Independent win (new seat)				
