= Kadambur Raju =

Indian politician

Kadambur C. Raju

Minister for Information and Publicity of Tamil Nadu
- In office 23 May 2016 – 3 May 2021
- Preceded by: K. T. Rajenthra Bhalaji
- Succeeded by: M. P. Saminathan
- Constituency: Kovilpatti

Member of the Tamil Nadu Legislative Assembly
- In office 16 May 2011 – 5 May 2026
- Preceded by: L. Radhakrishnan
- Succeeded by: Karunanidhi
- Constituency: Kovilpatti

Personal details
- Born: 20 August 1959 (age 67) Kovilpatti, Madras State, India (present-day Tamil Nadu)
- Party: Tamilaga Vettri Kazhagam (June 2026-Present)
- Other political affiliations: All India Anna Dravida Munnetra Kazhagam
- Children: 2
- Education: D.T.Ed., PUC
- Profession: Teacher; politician

Kadambur C. Raju (born 20 August 1959) is an Indian politician and the member of Tamil Nadu Legislative Assembly from the Kovilpatti constituency. He represents the All India Anna Dravida Munnetra Kazhagam (AIADMK) party.

== Political career ==
Raju won the Kovilpatti seat in the 14th Tamil Nadu Legislative Assembly in the 2011 elections. He was initially deselected from contesting the seat in the 2016 elections, with then AIADMK General Secretary J. Jayalalithaa preferring to let K. Ramanujam Ganesh stand. However, when it was understood that the experienced Vaiko was to stand there for the People's Welfare Front, Jayalalithaa chose to reinstate Raju because he was a more potent electoral force than Ganesh. A few days later, Vaiko announced that he would not contest the constituency. Raju won the seat with 428 more votes than his nearest rival.

Jayalalithaa appointed Raju as Minister for Information and Publicity in May 2016. This was his first cabinet post. Soon after Jayalalithaa died in December 2016, and despite being in the cabinet, Raju rebelled against then Chief Minister O. Panneerselvam. He demanded that V. K. Sasikala should become Chief Minister, arguing that the post and that of party general secretary, which Sasikala held, had always been combined since the party's foundation by M. G. Ramachandran. Although Sasikala did become party leader in early February, and Panneerselvam resigned as Chief Minister, she was not formally appointed to the office at the time of her conviction for criminal offences that effectively thwarted her ambitions.

In April 2017 he was one of three AIADMK ministers against whom police filed a First Information Report after allegations of obstructing officials who were conducting raids related to income tax. He was alleged to have done so at the house of Sarathkumar, the president of All India Samathuva Makkal Katchi. He attended a conference conducted by the Kamma Naidu caste organization in which he was born.

Following the 2026 Tamil Nadu Legislative Assembly election, Kadambur Raju has joined TVK in June 2026.

== Personal life ==
Raju was born on 20 August 1959 in Kovilpatti. He has a D.T.Ed. degree and took early retirement from his job as a teacher. He is married and he has two children.

== Elections contested and positions held ==
=== Tamil Nadu Legislative Assembly elections ===
Elections	Assembly	Constituency	Political party	Result	Vote percentage	Opposition		
Elections	Assembly	Constituency	Political party	Result	Vote percentage	Candidate	Political party	Vote percentage
2011	14th	Kovilpatti	AIADMK	Won	55.85%	G. Ramachandran	PMK	35.59%
2016	15th	Kovilpatti	AIADMK	Won	38.96%	A. Subramanian	DMK	38.70%
2021	16th	Kovilpatti	AIADMK	Won	37.89%	T. T. V. Dhinakaran	AMMK	31.04%
2026	17th	Kovilpatti	AIADMK	Lost	TBD	K. Karunanidhi	DMK	TBD

=== Positions in Tamil Nadu Legislative Assembly ===
Elections	Position	Elected constituency	Term in office		
Elections	Position	Elected constituency	Assumed office	Left office	Time in office
2011	Member of the Legislative Assembly	Kovilpatti	23 May 2011	21 May 2016	4 years, 364 days
2016	Minister for Information and Publicity	Kovilpatti	23 May 2016	3 May 2021	4 years, 345 days
2021	Member of the Legislative Assembly	Kovilpatti	11 May 2021	4 May 2026	5 years, 138 days
