= B. Srinivasa Rao =

Former Indian politician

B. Srinivasa Rao (10 April 1907 - 30 September 1961) was an Indian politician. He hailed from present-day Karnataka, but moved to Tamil Nadu and became a peasant organiser there.

== Early life ==
Srinivasa Rao was born on 10 April 1907.

== Politics ==
He was a member of the Congress Socialist Party and the Communist Party of India. He was an associate of S.V. Ghate and P. Jeevanandham, and was one of the nine founding members of the Tamil Nadu unit of CPI. He played an important role in the Tamil peasant movement from 1935 onward, in spite of not knowing Tamil language upon his arrival in the region. As of 1935 he was the secretary of the Congress Socialist Party in Madras. B. Srinivasa Rao was jailed for having distributed leaflets calling for boycott to the Silver Jubilee of King George V. After his release from prison he worked with P. Jeevanandham and P. Ramamurthi in setting up various trade unions. According to P. Ramamurthi, he founded the peasants and agricultural labour movement in Thanjavur District as "[h]e toured the district for months, lived with the peasants and agricultural labourers, ate in their houses and built a strong movement."

He managed the monthly publication of CPI 1938–1939. Upon the outbreak of World War II, he was arrested under the Defense of India Rules for having made anti-war speeches. He served as Joint Secretary of the All India Kisan Sabha 1954–1957. He was elected to the CPI National Council at the 1958 Amritsar Party Congress.

== Death ==
He died on 30 September 1961.
