= Uddanapalle Assembly constituency =

Former constituency of the Tamil Nadu Legislative Assembly

Coordinates: 12.608°N 77.937°E

Uddanapalle
- Former constituency for the Tamil Nadu Legislative Assembly

Constituency details
- Country: India
- Region: South India
- State: Tamil Nadu
- Established: 1951
- Abolished: 1971

Uddanapalle was a state assembly constituency in Tamil Nadu. It was in existence from the 1951 delimitation to 1971 state elections.

== Election results ==
=== 1971 ===
1971 Tamil Nadu Legislative Assembly election: Uddanapalle
Party	Candidate	Votes	%	±%
Independent	K. S. Kothanada Ramaiah	13,854	32.20%	
INC	N. Ramachandra Reddy	13,384	31.11%	−3.14%
DMK	D. R. Rajaram	12,998	30.21%	
Independent	M. Munisamy	2,786	6.48%	
Margin of victory		470	1.09%	−30.40%
Turnout		43,022	57.84%	−0.06%
Registered electors		85,295		
Independent gain from SWA		Swing	-33.54%	

=== 1967 ===
1967 Madras Legislative Assembly election: Uddanapalle
Party	Candidate	Votes	%	±%
SWA	K. S. Kothanada Ramaiah	29,391	65.75%	
INC	D. C. Vijendriah	15,313	34.25%	10.34%
Margin of victory		14,078	31.49%	25.28%
Turnout		44,704	57.90%	1.45%
Registered electors		81,023		
SWA hold		Swing	35.62%	

=== 1962 ===
1962 Madras Legislative Assembly election: Uddanapalle
Party	Candidate	Votes	%	±%
SWA	Chinna Munisamy Chettiar N. Munisamy Chetty	12,732	30.13%	
INC	K. Muni Reddy	10,107	23.92%	−5.62%
We Tamils	T. C. Srinivasa Muddaliar	9,931	23.50%	
Independent	Kothanada Ramiah	9,492	22.46%	
Margin of victory		2,625	6.21%	1.90%
Turnout		42,262	56.45%	30.73%
Registered electors		80,827		
SWA gain from Independent		Swing	-3.72%	

=== 1957 ===
1957 Madras Legislative Assembly election: Uddanapalli
Party	Candidate	Votes	%	±%
Independent	Muni Reddi	7,447	33.85%	
INC	Venkatakrishna Desai	6,498	29.53%	
Independent	Srinivasa Mudaliar	6,354	28.88%	
Independent	M. Krishnasami Gounder	1,703	7.74%	
Margin of victory		949	4.31%	
Turnout		22,002	25.72%	
Registered electors		85,551		
Independent win (new seat)				

=== 1952 ===
1952 Madras Legislative Assembly election: Uddanappalli
Party	Candidate	Votes	%	±%
INC	P. N. Munuswamy	10,051	42.60%	42.60%
KMPP	A. N. Nallappa Reddi	5,796	24.57%	
Independent	T. C. Sreenivasa Mudali	5,174	21.93%	
Independent	K. V. Ponnuswami	2,571	10.90%	
Margin of victory		4,255	18.04%	
Turnout		23,592	36.36%	
Registered electors		64,886		
INC win (new seat)				
