= L. Ayyalusamy =

Indian politician

L. Ayyalusamy is an Indian politician and former Member of the Legislative Assembly of Tamil Nadu. He was elected to the Tamil Nadu legislative assembly as a Communist Party of India candidate from Kovilpatti constituency in 1996 election.
