= V. Subbaiah Naicker =

Indian politician

Member of the Madras State Assembly
- In office 1957–1962
- Preceded by: Selvaraj
- Constituency: Kovilpatti

Personal details
- Party: Independent politician

V. Subbaiah Naicker was an Indian politician and former Member of the Legislative Assembly of Tamil Nadu. He was elected to the Tamil Nadu legislative assembly as an Independent candidate from Kovilpatti constituency in 1957 election.
