= Panjapatti Assembly constituency =

Coordinates: 10.83°N 78.30°E

Panjapatti
- Former constituency for the Tamil Nadu Legislative Assembly

Constituency details
- Country: India
- Region: South India
- State: Tamil Nadu
- District: Karur
- Lok Sabha constituency: Karur
- Established: 1957
- Abolished: 1967
- Total electors: 84,244
- Reservation: None

Panjapatti is a former constituency of the Legislative Assembly of Tamil Nadu, a southern state of India. It was in Karur district and it was also part of Karur Lok Sabha constituency.

== Members of the Legislative Assembly ==
Year	Winner	Party
1962	K. Karunagari Muthiah	Indian National Congress
1957	K. Karunagari Muthiah	Indian National Congress

== Election results ==
Vote share of winning candidates
1962	56.27%
1957	54.50%

=== 1962 ===
1962 Madras Legislative Assembly election: Panjapatti
Party	Candidate	Votes	%	±%
INC	K. Karunagari Muthiah	25,520	56.27%	1.76%
DMK	A. S. Ganapathy	15,416	33.99%	
SWA	P. Krishnaswamy	2,825	6.23%	
Independent	T. M. Andivappan	967	2.13%	
Independent	K. V. Karupasami	628	1.38%	
Margin of victory		10,104	22.28%	4.07%
Turnout		45,356	57.09%	8.85%
Registered electors		84,244		
INC hold		Swing	1.76%	

=== 1957 ===
1957 Madras Legislative Assembly election: Panjapatti
Party	Candidate	Votes	%	±%
INC	K. Karunagari Muthiah	20,799	54.50%	
Independent	P. Poonambala Gounder	13,852	36.30%	
Independent	V. S. M. Abdulla Rowther	3,510	9.20%	
Margin of victory		6,947	18.20%	
Turnout		38,161	48.23%	
Registered electors		79,117		
INC win (new seat)				
