= Tirukostiyur Assembly constituency =

Coordinates: 10.06°N 78.56°E

Tirukostiyur
- Former constituency for the Tamil Nadu Legislative Assembly

Constituency details
- Country: India
- Region: South India
- State: Tamil Nadu
- District: Sivaganga
- Lok Sabha constituency: Tirukostiyur Assembly constituency
- Established: 1957
- Abolished: 1967
- Total electors: 93,641

Tirukostiyur was former constituency in the Tamil Nadu Legislative Assembly of Tamil Nadu, a southern state of India. It was in Sivaganga district.

== Members of the Legislative Assembly ==
Madras State MLAs
Year	Winner	Party
1962	S. Madhavan	Dravida Munnetra Kazhagam
1957	N. V. Chokkalingam Ambalam	Indian National Congress

== Election results ==
Vote share of winning candidates
1962	37.95%
1957	44.22%

=== 1962 ===
1962 Madras Legislative Assembly election: Tirukostiyur
Party	Candidate	Votes	%	±%
DMK	S. Madhavan	24,833	37.95%	
INC	N. V. Chokkalingam Ambalam	21,284	32.53%	−11.70%
CPI	S. Shanmugam	15,613	23.86%	
Independent	P. V. Muthiah Ambalam	3,707	5.66%	
Margin of victory		3,549	5.42%	−14.05%
Turnout		65,437	72.72%	19.25%
Registered electors		93,641		
DMK gain from INC		Swing	-6.27%	

=== 1957 ===
1957 Madras Legislative Assembly election: Tirukostiyur
Party	Candidate	Votes	%	±%
INC	N. V. Chokkalingam Ambalam	20,611	44.22%	
CPI	S. Shanmugam	11,533	24.75%	
Independent	Kannadasan	9,389	20.15%	
Independent	N. K. Muthulingam	3,184	6.83%	
Independent	P. A. K. Muhamud Yusuff Lebbai	1,890	4.06%	
Margin of victory		9,078	19.48%	
Turnout		46,607	53.47%	
Registered electors		87,159		
INC win (new seat)				
