= Washermanpet Assembly constituency =

Coordinates: 13.1131°N 80.2886°E

Washermanpet
- Former constituency for the Tamil Nadu Legislative Assembly

Constituency details
- Country: India
- Region: South India
- State: Tamil Nadu
- District: Chennai
- Established: 1951
- Abolished: 1976
- Total electors: 1,09,476
- Reservation: None

Washermanpet was an Assembly constituency in Tamil Nadu. The elections conducted in the constituency and winners are listed below. It existed from the 1951 delimitation to 1971 elections.

== Members of the Legislative Assembly ==
Year	Winner	Party
1952	Jeevanandam	Communist Party of India
1957	M. Mayandi Nadar	Indian National Congress
1962	M. Mayandi Nadar	Indian National Congress
1967	M. Vedachalam	Dravida Munnetra Kazhagam
1971	M. Vedachalam	Dravida Munnetra Kazhagam

== Election results ==
Vote share of winning candidates
1971	54.04%
1967	50.70%
1962	37.77%
1957	29.49%
1952	33.22%

=== 1971 ===
1971 Tamil Nadu Legislative Assembly election: Washermanpet
Party	Candidate	Votes	%	±%
DMK	M. Vedachalam	38,989	54.04%	3.35%
INC	Ananthan	32,231	44.68%	4.60%
Independent	K V Manavala Naicker	923	1.28%	
Margin of victory		6,758	9.37%	−1.25%
Turnout		72,143	67.46%	−9.22%
Registered electors		1,09,476		
DMK hold		Swing	3.35%	

=== 1967 ===
1967 Madras Legislative Assembly election: Washermanpet
Party	Candidate	Votes	%	±%
DMK	M. Vedachalam	34,571	50.70%	15.33%
INC	M. Mayandi Nadar	27,329	40.08%	2.31%
Independent	R. Nayakar	6,072	8.90%	
Independent	K. Balakrishnan	218	0.32%	
Margin of victory		7,242	10.62%	8.22%
Turnout		68,190	76.68%	1.36%
Registered electors		91,287		
DMK gain from INC		Swing	12.93%	

=== 1962 ===
1962 Madras Legislative Assembly election: Washermanpet
Party	Candidate	Votes	%	±%
INC	M. Mayandi Nadar	25,732	37.77%	8.28%
DMK	M. Vedachalam	24,095	35.37%	
CPI	P. Jeevanandham	10,049	14.75%	
SWA	P. M. Lingesan	8,250	12.11%	
Margin of victory		1,637	2.40%	1.17%
Turnout		68,126	75.32%	33.96%
Registered electors		93,359		
INC hold		Swing	8.28%	

=== 1957 ===
1957 Madras Legislative Assembly election: Washermanpet
Party	Candidate	Votes	%	±%
INC	M. Mayandi Nadar	11,770	29.49%	3.20%
Independent	N. Jeevarathanam	11,279	28.26%	
Independent	P. M. Lingesan	9,152	22.93%	
CPI	A. S. K. Lyengar	7,005	17.55%	
Independent	S. Daivasigamoney	707	1.77%	
Margin of victory		491	1.23%	−5.70%
Turnout		39,913	41.37%	−7.16%
Registered electors		96,480		
INC gain from CPI		Swing	-3.73%	

=== 1952 ===
1952 Madras Legislative Assembly election: Washermanpet
Party	Candidate	Votes	%	±%
CPI	P. Jeevanandham	12,526	33.22%	
INC	Radhakrishna Pillai	9,914	26.29%	26.29%
Independent	Albert Jesudason	3,649	9.68%	
Independent	Jevarathinam	3,618	9.59%	
Independent	Pandian	2,409	6.39%	
TTP	Parthasarathy Naicker	1,791	4.75%	
Independent	B. Paramanandam	1,311	3.48%	
KMPP	Seetharaman Nayudu	734	1.95%	
Independent	Arjuna Nayudu	582	1.54%	
Independent	Arjuna Naicker	448	1.19%	
Independent	Ramanathan	298	0.79%	
Margin of victory		2,612	6.93%	
Turnout		37,710	48.53%	
Registered electors		77,709		
CPI win (new seat)				
