= Kodaikanal Assembly constituency =

Former state assembly constituency in Dindigul district in Tamil Nadu, India

Coordinates: 10.24°N 77.49°E

Kodaikanal
- Former constituency for the Tamil Nadu Legislative Assembly

Constituency details
- Country: India
- Region: South India
- State: Tamil Nadu
- District: Dindigul
- Lok Sabha constituency: Dindigul
- Established: 1957
- Abolished: 1962
- Total electors: 90,838

Kodaikanal is a former state assembly constituency in Dindigul district in Tamil Nadu, India.

== Members of the Legislative Assembly ==
Year	Winner	Party
1957	M. Alagirisamy	Indian National Congress
1962	M. Alagirisamy	Indian National Congress

== Election results ==
Vote share of winning candidates
1962	49.71%
1957	47.94%

=== 1962 ===
1962 Madras Legislative Assembly election: Kodaikanal
Party	Candidate	Votes	%	±%
INC	M. Alagirisamy	31,062	49.71%	1.77%
DMK	Somasundaram	27,671	44.29%	
PSP	Thangiah Bhoopathi	2,879	4.61%	
Independent	Murugiah	869	1.39%	
Margin of victory		3,391	5.43%	−2.65%
Turnout		62,481	71.34%	24.44%
Registered electors		90,838		
INC hold		Swing	1.77%	

=== 1957 ===
1957 Madras Legislative Assembly election: Kodaikanal
Party	Candidate	Votes	%	±%
INC	M. Alagirisamy	21,107	47.94%	
Independent	Gurusamy	17,552	39.87%	
Independent	Gnanavaram	5,365	12.19%	
Margin of victory		3,555	8.08%	
Turnout		44,024	46.90%	
Registered electors		93,864		
INC win (new seat)				
