= N. V. Venugopalakrishnasami =

Indian politician

N. V. Venugopalakrishnasami was an Indian politician and former Member of the Legislative Assembly of Tamil Nadu. He was elected to the Tamil Nadu legislative assembly as an Independent candidate from Kovilpatti constituency in 1962 election.
