= Chennimalai Assembly constituency =

Former constituency in Tamil Nadu, India

Coordinates: 11.17°N 77.60°E

Chennimalai
- Former constituency for the Tamil Nadu Legislative Assembly

Constituency details
- Country: India
- Region: South India
- State: Tamil Nadu
- District: Erode
- Lok Sabha constituency: Erode
- Established: 1957
- Abolished: 1962
- Total electors: 95,182
- Reservation: None

Chennimalai is a former state assembly constituency in Erode district in Tamil Nadu, India.

== Members of the Legislative Assembly ==
Election	Member	Party
1957	K. P. Nallasivam	Independent politician
1962	K. P. Nallasivam	Socialist Party of India

Madras State

== Election results ==
Vote share of winning candidates
1962	50.82%
1957	53.00%

=== Assembly election 1962 ===
1962 Madras State Legislative Assembly election : Chennimalai
Party	Candidate	Votes	%	±%
SOC	K. P. Nallasivam	35,379	50.82%	New
INC	K. S. Periasami Gounder	26,978	38.75%	▲2.88
DMK	A. S. Samiappan	5,523	7.93%	New
CPI	M. Ramasain Gounder	1,742	2.50%	New
Margin of victory		8,401	12.07%	▼5.06
Turnout		72,237	75.89%	▲23.57
Total valid votes		69,622		
Registered electors		95,182		▲18.41
SOC gain from Independent		Swing	▼2.18	

=== Assembly election 1957 ===
1957 Madras State Legislative Assembly election : Chennimalai
Party	Candidate	Votes	%	±%
Independent	K. P. Nallasivam	22,289	53.00%	New
INC	A. Thengappa Gounder	15,085	35.87%	New
Independent	S. K. Sundaram	4,682	11.13%	New
Margin of victory		7,204	17.13%	
Turnout		42,056	52.32%	
Total valid votes		42,056		
Registered electors		80,381		
Independent win (new seat)				
