= Jana Sakthi =

- Type: Weekly
- Format: Print
- Owner: Jana Sakthi Trust
- Publisher: R. Mutharasan
- Editor: K. Subbarayan
- Founded: 1938; 88 years ago
- Political alignment: Left-wing
- Language: Tamil
- Headquarters: Chennai
- Website: "Official website".
- Free online archives: "epaper". Archived from the original on 19 September 2020.

The Jana Sakthi is the organ of the Communist Party of India Tamil Nadu State Council. The first editor was P. Jeevanandham and it started in 1938. K. Subbarayan is the current editor of Jana Sakthi.
