= Valavanur Assembly constituency =

Coordinates: 11.92°N 79.58°E

Valavanur
- Former constituency for the Tamil Nadu Legislative Assembly

Constituency details
- Country: India
- Region: South India
- State: Tamil Nadu
- District: Viluppuram
- Lok Sabha constituency: Viluppuram
- Established: 1957
- Abolished: 1962
- Total electors: 1,02,634
- Reservation: None

Valavanur is a former state assembly constituency in Viluppuram district in Tamil Nadu, India.

== Members of the Legislative Assembly ==
| Year | Winner | Party |
|---|---|---|
| 1962 | K. M. Krishna Goundar | Indian National Congress |
| 1957 | A. Govindasam Nayagar | Independent politician |

== Election results ==
Vote share of winning candidates
| 1962 | 54.88% |
| 1957 | 61.39% |

=== 1962 ===
1962 Madras Legislative Assembly election: Valavanur
| Party | Candidate | Votes | % | ±% |
|---|---|---|---|---|
| INC | K. M. Krishna Goundar | 38,580 | 54.88% | 23.54% |
| DMK | A. Govindasamy | 31,718 | 45.12% | |
| Margin of victory | | 6,862 | 9.76% | −20.28% |
| Turnout | | 70,298 | 71.54% | 16.44% |
| Registered electors | | 1,02,634 | | |
| INC gain from Independent | | Swing | -6.51% | |

=== 1957 ===
1957 Madras Legislative Assembly election: Valavanur
| Party | Candidate | Votes | % | ±% |
|---|---|---|---|---|
| Independent | A. Govindasam Nayagar | 31,836 | 61.39% | |
| INC | K. M. Krishna Goundar | 16,256 | 31.35% | |
| Independent | P. Alagappa | 3,769 | 7.27% | |
| Margin of victory | | 15,580 | 30.04% | |
| Turnout | | 51,861 | 55.10% | |
| Registered electors | | 94,114 | | |
| Independent win (new seat) | | | | |
