= Ramasamy (Kovilpatti MLA) =

Indian politician

Ramasamy Doss

Member of the Madras State Assembly
- In office 1952–1957
- Preceded by: Shanmugham
- Constituency: Kovilpatti

Personal details
- Party: Indian National Congress

Ramasamy Doss was an Indian politician and former Member of the Legislative Assembly of Tamil Nadu. He was elected to the Tamil Nadu legislative assembly as an Indian National Congress candidate from Kovilpatti constituency in 1952 election.
