= G. Narayanasamy Naidu =

Indian politician

Member of the Madras State Assembly
- In office 1952–1957
- Preceded by: Palanisamy Nadar
- Constituency: Aduthurai
- In office 1957 - 1962; 1962 - 1967
- Preceded by: Samiyappa Mudaliar
- Constituency: Mayiladuthurai

Personal details
- Party: Indian National Congress

G. Narayanasamy Naidu was an Indian politician and former Member of the Legislative Assembly of Tamil Nadu. He was elected to the Tamil Nadu legislative assembly from Mayuram constituency as an Indian National Congress candidate in 1957, and 1962 elections. He was one of the two winners in 1957 election, the other being P. Jayaraj from Congress party. He was elected as an Indian National Congress candidate from Aduthurai constituency in 1952 election.
