= Nallur Assembly constituency =

Coordinates: 13.285°N 80.240°E

Nallur
- Former constituency for the Tamil Nadu Legislative Assembly

Constituency details
- Country: India
- Region: South India
- State: Tamil Nadu
- District: Cuddalore
- Established: 1957
- Abolished: 1967
- Total electors: 88,518
- Reservation: None

Nallur was former constituency in the Tamil Nadu Legislative Assembly of Tamil Nadu, a southern state of India. It was in Cuddalore district.

== Members of the Legislative Assembly ==
Year	Winner	Party
1962	K. Narayanasami	Indian National Congress
1957	Vedamanickam	Independent politician

== Election results ==
Vote share of winning candidates
1962	55.03%
1957	34.10%

=== 1962 ===
1962 Madras Legislative Assembly election: Nallur
Party	Candidate	Votes	%	±%
INC	K. Narayanasami	28,322	55.03%	30.52%
DMK	T. Pichamuthu	20,209	39.27%	
Independent	V. Duraisami	1,323	2.57%	
SWA	M. Kattimuthu	1,239	2.41%	
Independent	A. Periasami	373	0.72%	
Margin of victory		8,113	15.76%	10.02%
Turnout		51,466	61.29%	2.74%
Registered electors		88,518		
INC gain from Independent		Swing	20.93%	

=== 1957 ===
1957 Madras Legislative Assembly election: Nallur
Party	Candidate	Votes	%	±%
Independent	Vedamanickam	16,105	34.10%	
Independent	K. S. Venkatakrishna Reddiar	13,394	28.36%	
INC	Narayanasami Pillai	11,577	24.51%	
Independent	Kathirvel Padayachi	4,637	9.82%	
Independent	Paramasivam	1,515	3.21%	
Margin of victory		2,711	5.74%	
Turnout		47,228	58.55%	
Registered electors		80,661		
Independent win (new seat)				
