= M. M. S. Abul Hassan =

Indian politician

M. M. S. Abul Hassan (died 19 January 2001) was an Indian politician and Member of the Legislative Assembly of Tamil Nadu. He was elected to the Tamil Nadu legislative assembly from Mayuram constituency as an Indian National Congress candidate in 1991 election, and as Tamil Maanila Congress (Moopanar) candidate in 1996 election.

Hassan died on 19 January 2001.
