= N. Kittappa =

Indian politician (1931–1983)

N. Kittappa (10 February 1931 – 11 November 1983) was an Indian politician who was a Member of the Legislative Assembly for Tamil Nadu. He was elected to the Tamil Nadu legislative assembly from Mayuram constituency as a Dravida Munnetra Kazhagam (DMK) candidate in the 1967, 1971, 1977, and 1980 elections.

== Political career ==
Kittappa was associated with the Dravidar Kazhagam as a student secretary from 1946 and joined the DMK party in 1949. Within the party, he held several organizational positions, including Member in charge of publicity, Deputy Secretary and Secretary of the Mayuram town unit, and Secretary of the DMK Mayuram taluk unit. He also served as a member of the party's General Body and as Deputy Secretary of the DMK in the undivided Thanjavur district. In addition, he was formerly the Assistant Editor of the bi-monthly Tamil publication Ezhuchi.

He participated in the Kallakudi agitation in 1953 and was imprisoned along with the former Chief Minister of Tamil Nadu M. Karunanidhi. He took part in various agitations organized by the DMK. He was associated with several early leaders from the then undivided Thanjavur district, including Mannai N. Narayanasamy, Ko.Si. Mani, and M. Karunanidhi. Following the leadership of C. N. Annadurai, he continued to support Karunanidhi's leadership within the party.

Kittappa was elected from the Mayiladuthurai constituency in four consecutive elections held in 1967, 1971, 1977, and 1980 elections.

In 1989, after assuming office, M. Karunanidhi ordered that the N. Kittappa Municipal Higher Secondary School in Koranad, Mayiladuthurai, be named in his honor. A municipal building in the town, known as Kittappa Angadi, was also established bearing his name.

== Personal life and death ==
Kittappa was born on 10 February 1931 in Mayavaram (now known as Mayiladuthurai), Tamil Nadu, India. He completed his Secondary School Leaving Certificate (SSLC) at the Municipal High School in Mayiladuthurai. Kittappa later married and had two children, a son and a daughter. He resided in Koranad, a neighborhood of Mayiladuthurai.

Kittappa died on 11 November 1983, at the age of 57.

== Sources ==
- Who's Who 1967. Who's Who Publishers. 1967. p. 106.
