= R. Shyamala =

Indian politician

R. Shyamala is an Indian politician and former Member of the Legislative Assembly of Tamil Nadu. She was elected to the Tamil Nadu legislative assembly as an Anna Dravida Munnetra Kazhagam candidate from Kovilpatti constituency in 1991 election.
