= Kovilpalayam Assembly constituency =

Coordinates: 10°44′37.9″N 77°01′25.2″E

Kovilpalayam
- Former constituency for the Tamil Nadu Legislative Assembly

Constituency details
- Country: India
- Region: South India
- State: Tamil Nadu
- District: Coimbatore
- Established: 1951
- Abolished: 1967
- Total electors: 80,641
- Reservation: None

Kovilpalayam Assembly constituency was former state assembly constituency in Coimbatore district, Tamil Nadu, India. It existed from the 1951 delimitation to 1967.

== Members of the Legislative Assembly ==
Year	Winner	Party
Madras State
1952	V . K . Palani Swamy Gounder	Indian National Congress
1957	C. Subramaniam	Indian National Congress
1962	M. P. Muthukaruppasami Kounder	Indian National Congress

== Election results ==
Vote share of winning candidates
1962	51.22 %
1957	56.27 %
1952	54.99 %

=== 1962 ===
1962 Madras Legislative Assembly election: Koilpalayam
Party	Candidate	Votes	%	±%
INC	M. P. Muthukaruppasami Kounder	27,464	51.22%	−5.05%
DMK	K. Gopal	13,636	25.43%	
PSP	C. Gurusami Naidu	11,216	20.92%	
Independent	S. Krishnasami Gounder	1,308	2.44%	
Margin of victory		13,828	25.79%	7.17%
Turnout		53,624	70.77%	8.85%
Registered electors		80,641		
INC hold		Swing	-5.05%	

=== 1957 ===
1957 Madras Legislative Assembly election: Koilpalayam
Party	Candidate	Votes	%	±%
INC	C. Subramaniam	27,199	56.27%	
PSP	C. Guruswamy Naidu	18,202	37.66%	
Independent	N. Krishnamurthy	2,937	6.08%	
Margin of victory		8,997	18.61%	
Turnout		48,338	61.92%	
Registered electors		78,059		
INC hold		Swing		

=== 1952 ===
1952 Madras Legislative Assembly election: Koilpalaiyam
Party	Candidate	Votes	%	±%
INC	V . K . Palani Swamy Gounder	20,539	54.99%	
Socialist Party (India)	Ramaswamy Naidu	10,193	27.29%	
Independent	Shanmugasundaram Chettiar	5,336	14.29%	
Independent	Stephen	1,281	3.43%	
Margin of victory		10,346	27.70%	
Turnout		37,349	55.66%	
Registered electors		67,098		
INC win (new seat)				
