= Andanallur Assembly constituency =

Former legislative Assembly constituency in Andhra Pradesh, India

Coordinates: 10.87°N 78.59°E

Andanallur
- Former constituency for the Tamil Nadu Legislative Assembly

Constituency details
- Country: India
- Region: South India
- State: Tamil Nadu
- District: Tiruchirappalli
- Established: 1957
- Abolished: 1962
- Total electors: 88,953
- Reservation: None

Andanallur is a former state assembly constituency in Tiruchirappalli district in Tamil Nadu, India.

== Members of the Legislative Assembly ==
| Year | Winner | Party |
|---|---|---|
| 1962 | A. Chinnathurai Ambalakaran | Indian National Congress |
| 1957 | Annamalai Muthuraja | Indian National Congress |

== Election results ==
Vote share of winning candidates
| 1962 | 58.29% |
| 1957 | 62.42% |

=== Assembly election 1962 ===
1962 Madras State Legislative Assembly election : Andanallur
| Party | Candidate | Votes | % | ±% |
|---|---|---|---|---|
| INC | A. Chinnathurai Ambalakaran | 32,580 | 58.29% | ▼4.13 |
| DMK | K. P. Annavi | 20,970 | 37.52% | New |
| TNP | P. Periasamy | 1,655 | 2.96% | New |
| Independent | V. Anganna Chettiar | 459 | 0.82% | |
| Margin of victory | | 11,610 | 20.77% | ▼17.15 |
| Turnout | | 57,201 | 64.30% | ▲23.70 |
| Total valid votes | | 55,897 | | |
| Registered electors | | 88,953 | | ▲5.11 |
| INC hold | | Swing | | |

=== Assembly election 1957 ===
1957 Madras State Legislative Assembly election : Andanallur
| Party | Candidate | Votes | % | ±% |
|---|---|---|---|---|
| INC | Annamalai Muthuraja | 21,444 | 62.42% | New |
| Independent | E. P. Mathuram | 8,417 | 24.50% | New |
| Independent | A. Rajagopalam | 4,496 | 13.09% | New |
| Margin of victory | | 13,027 | 37.92% | |
| Turnout | | 34,357 | 40.60% | |
| Total valid votes | | 34,357 | | |
| Registered electors | | 84,629 | | |
| INC win (new seat) | | | | |
