= Ramamirda Thondaman =

Indian politician

Member of the Madras State Assembly
- In office 1957–1962
- Preceded by: Mohammed Amirdeen
- Constituency: Aduthurai

Personal details
- Party: Indian National Congress

Ramamirda Thondaman was an Indian politician and former Member of the Legislative Assembly of Tamil Nadu. He was elected to the Tamil Nadu legislative assembly as an Indian National Congress candidate from Aduthurai constituency in 1957 election.
