= Jega Veerapandian =

Indian politician

Jaga Veerapandian
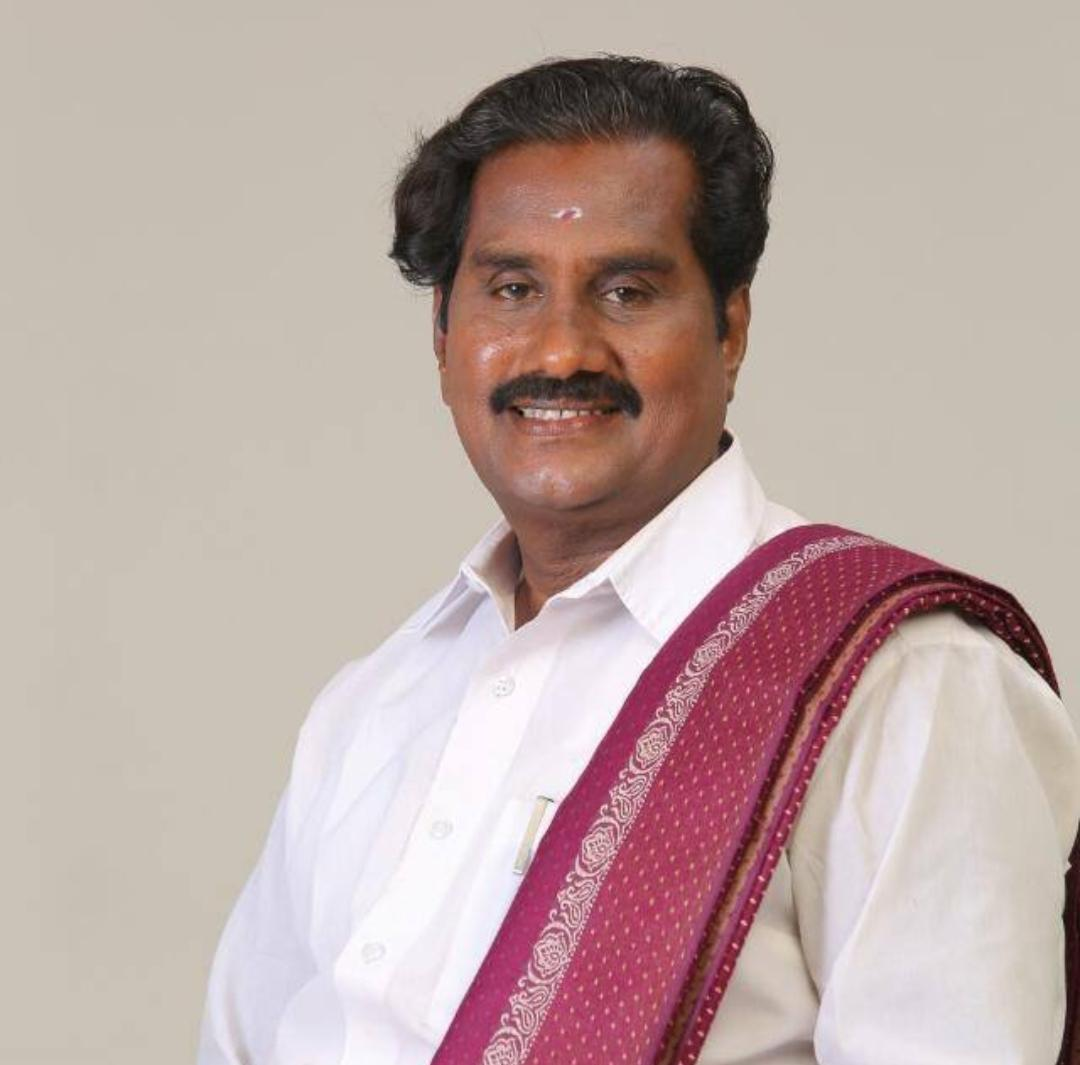

Agricultural Labor Wing Joint Secretary of Dravida Munnetra Kazhagam

President of General Labor Organisation
- Incumbent
- Assumed office 1980

Member of Legislative Assembly, Government of Tamilnadu
- In office 14 May 2001 – 12 May 2006
- Constituency: Mayiladuthurai

Personal details
- Born: Mayiladuthurai, Tamil Nadu, India
- Party: Dravida Munnetra Kazhagam
- Spouse(s): Thenmozhi Jagaveerapandian, Former Municipal Chairperson, Mayiladuthurai (m. 1998)
- Children: 3
- Education: Annamalai University, Chidambaram, A.V.C College, Mannampandal, Mayiladuthurai M.A (Economics), M.A (Demography), M.Phil, B.Ed, M.B.A.

Jaga Veerapandian is an Indian politician. He was a former member of the Tamil Nadu legislative assembly elected from Mayiladuthurai constituency as a Bharatiya Janata Party candidate in 2001 under the alliance of Dravida Munnetra Kazhagam. He is also the president of General Labour Organisation (GLO), Mayiladuthurai .

== See also ==
2001 Tamil Nadu Legislative Assembly election
