= Kadambur Assembly constituency =

Former assembly constituency of Tamil Nadu, India

Coordinates: 8.98°N 77.87°E

Kadambur
- Former constituency for the Tamil Nadu Legislative Assembly

Constituency details
- Country: India
- Region: South India
- State: Tamil Nadu
- District: Thoothukudi
- Lok Sabha constituency: Thoothukkudi
- Established: 1951
- Abolished: 1962
- Reservation: None

Kadambur was a state assembly constituency in Tamil Nadu. It was in existence from the 1951 delimitation to 1962 state elections.

== Members of the Legislative Assembly ==
Year	Winner	Party
1952	Venugopala Krishnaswamy	Indian National Congress
1957	S. Sangili and K. Ramasubbu	Indian National Congress
1962	S. Sangili	Indian National Congress

== Election results ==
=== 1957 ===
1957 Madras Legislative Assembly election: Kadambur
Party	Candidate	Votes	%	±%
INC	K. Ramasubbu	34,155	29.28%	−15.01%
INC	Sangili (SC)	27,787	23.82%	−20.47%
Independent	S. Arunachala Nadar	13,447	11.53%	
Independent	V. Suppayan (SC)	9,867	8.46%	
Independent	Marinaicker	9,096	7.80%	
Independent	M. Mariappan	8,865	7.60%	
CPI	Muthia (SC)	6,770	5.80%	
Independent	Velayudam (SC)	6,669	5.72%	
Margin of victory		6,368	5.46%	−18.82%
Turnout		1,16,656	72.29%	21.63%
Registered electors		1,61,364		
INC hold		Swing	-15.01%	

=== 1952 ===
1952 Madras Legislative Assembly election: Kadambur
Party	Candidate	Votes	%	±%
INC	Venugopala Krishnaswamy	17,000	44.29%	44.29%
Independent	Subbiah Naicker	7,682	20.01%	
Socialist Party (India)	Krishnaswami	6,343	16.53%	
KMPP	Karunakara Pandian	3,943	10.27%	
Independent	John	3,414	8.89%	
Margin of victory		9,318	24.28%	
Turnout		38,382	50.67%	
Registered electors		75,752		
INC win (new seat)				
