= K. Ramasubbu =

Indian politician (born 1911)

Member of the Madras State Assembly
- In office 1957–1962
- Constituency: Kadambur

Personal details
- Party: Indian National Congress

K. Ramasubbu (born 30 May 1911, date of death unknown) was an Indian politician who was a member of the Tamil Nadu Legislative Assembly.

Ramasubbu was born in Palayamkottai, Tirunelveli district on 30 May 1911. He had school education at St. Xavier's Higher Secondary School, Palayamkottai. He studied at The Madurai Diraviyam Thayumanavar Hindu College in Tirunelveli Pettai and the Presidency College in Chennai. He was also the district functionary of the Indian National Congress Party and held several key positions in the Tirunelveli district administration. He contested and won assembly elections of Kadampur Assembly constituency in the year 1957.
