= A. S. Subbaraj =

Indian politician

Member of the Tamil Nadu Legislative Assembly
- In office 1957–1967
- Succeeded by: S. Srinivasan
- Constituency: Bodinayakanur
- In office 1952–1957
- Succeeded by: K. Pandiaraj
- Constituency: Uthamapalayam

Personal details
- Party: Indian National Congress

A. S. Subbaraj (28 October 1914 – 22 February 1963) was an Indian politician and former Member of the Legislative Assembly of Tamil Nadu. He was elected to the Tamil Nadu legislative assembly as an Indian National Congress candidate from Uthamapalayam constituency in 1952 election and from Bodinayakkanur constituency in 1957 and 1962 elections.

He was born to a Kulala family but adopted by a prominent Chettiar family, The Pankajam family of Bodinayakanur. He co-authored high-level petitions directly to Prime Minister Jawaharlal Nehru when the state began drafting the first Other Backward Class lists, to ensure Kulalas (who often used the honorific title "Chettiar" or "Telugu Chettiar") would not be excluded from these benefits.

== Electoral performance ==
Election	Constituency	Political party	Result	Vote %	Opposition			Ref
Election	Constituency	Political party	Result	Vote %	Candidate	Political party	Vote %	Ref
1952	Uthamapalayam	INC	Won	48.56%	Muthiah	Socialist Party (India)	31.96%	
1957	Bodinayakanur	INC	Won	58.11%	M. Muthiala	Independent	41.89%	
1962	Bodinayakanur	INC	Won	54.61%	R. Subbiah	Independent	25.85%	
