= Aduthurai Assembly constituency =

Former legislative Assembly constituency in Andhra Pradesh, India

Coordinates: 11.017489°N 79.480526°E

Aduthurai
- Former constituency for the Tamil Nadu Legislative Assembly

Constituency details
- Country: India
- Region: South India
- State: Tamil Nadu
- District: Thanjavur
- Lok Sabha constituency: Thanjavur
- Established: 1951
- Abolished: 1971
- Total electors: 97,689
- Reservation: None

Aduthurai was a state assembly constituency in the Indian state of Tamil Nadu. The elections conducted in the constituency and winners are listed below.

== Members of the Legislative Assembly ==
Election	Member	Party
1952	G. Narayanasamy Naidu	Indian National Congress
1957	Ramamirda Thondaman	Indian National Congress
1962	K. S. Mani	Dravida Munnetra Kazhagam
1967	A. Marimuthu	Indian National Congress
1971	K. Rajamanickam	Dravida Munnetra Kazhagam

Madras State

== Election results ==
=== Assembly election 1971 ===
1971 Tamil Nadu Legislative Assembly election : Aduthurai
Party	Candidate	Votes	%	±%
DMK	K. Rajamanickam	40,023	51.26%	▲8.81
INC	A. Marimuthu	38,060	48.74%	New
Margin of victory		1,963	2.51%	▼3.56
Turnout		80,347	82.25%	▼2.18
Total valid votes		78,083		
Registered electors		97,689		▲5.58
DMK gain from INC		Swing	▲2.74	

=== Assembly election 1967 ===
1967 Madras State Legislative Assembly election : Aduthurai
Party	Candidate	Votes	%	±%
INC	A. Marimuthu	36,537	48.52%	▲5.38
DMK	M. G. Mani	31,965	42.45%	▼10.93
CPI	A. M. Govindarajan	5,353	7.11%	New
Independent	K. Govinmdarasan	975	1.29%	
Independent	K. Manian	474	0.63%	
Margin of victory		4,572	6.07%	▼4.17
Turnout		78,121	84.43%	▲7.31
Total valid votes		75,304		
Registered electors		92,525		▼7.75
INC gain from DMK		Swing	▼4.86	

=== Assembly election 1962 ===
1962 Madras State Legislative Assembly election : Aduthurai
Party	Candidate	Votes	%	±%
DMK	K. S. Mani	39,750	53.38%	New
INC	Ramamirda Thondaman	32,125	43.14%	▼11.02
Independent	Mahalinga Padayachi	1,330	1.79%	
PSP	Sathivel	1,257	1.69%	New
Margin of victory		7,625	10.24%	▼25.36
Turnout		77,350	77.12%	▲21.48
Total valid votes		74,462		
Registered electors		100,303		▲2.40
DMK gain from INC		Swing	▼0.78	

=== Assembly election 1957 ===
1957 Madras State Legislative Assembly election : Aduthurai
Party	Candidate	Votes	%	±%
INC	Ramamirda Thondaman	29,516	54.16%	▼3.37
Independent	Mohammed Amirdeen	10,114	18.56%	
Independent	Mohammed Hussain	7,720	14.17%	
Independent	Dharmalingam	6,136	11.26%	
Independent	P. Arunachalam	1,010	1.85%	
Margin of victory		19,402	35.60%	▲5.60
Turnout		54,496	55.64%	▼10.81
Total valid votes		54,496		
Registered electors		97,950		▲43.44
INC hold		Swing		

=== Assembly election 1952 ===
1952 Madras State Legislative Assembly election : Aduthurai
Party	Candidate	Votes	%	±%
INC	G. Narayanasamy Naidu	26,107	57.53%	New
Justice Party	Samiyappa Mudaliar	12,496	27.54%	New
Independent	Sivagurunatha Pillai	5,318	11.72%	New
Independent	Anantharama Bhagavathar	1,455	3.21%	New
Margin of victory		13,611	30.00%	
Turnout		45,376	66.45%	
Total valid votes		45,376		
Registered electors		68,288		
INC win (new seat)				
