= R. Arulselvan =

Indian politician

R. Arulselvan is an Indian politician and was a member of the 14th Tamil Nadu Legislative Assembly from the Mayiladuthurai constituency. He represented the Desiya Murpokku Dravidar Kazhagam party.

The elections of 2016 resulted in his constituency being won by V. Rathakrishnan. He is presently working under the leadership of M.K.Stalin in Dravidar Munetra Kazhagam Party.
