= S. Rajakumar =

Indian politician

S. Rajakumar is an Indian politician. A member of the Indian National Congress, he represents the Mayiladuthurai constituency in the Tamil Nadu Legislative Assembly.

Rajakumar was first elected to the Tamil Nadu Legislative Assembly in 2006. He ran for re-election in 2011 but lost to DMDK candidate R. Arulselvan by approximately 3,000 votes. He ran again in the 2021 election and was re-elected to his former office, defeating Pattali Makkal Katchi candidate A. Palanichamy.
