= K. Rajamanickam =

Indian politician

K. Rajamanickam was an Indian politician and former Member of the Legislative Assembly of Tamil Nadu. He was elected to the Tamil Nadu legislative assembly as a Dravida Munnetra Kazhagam candidate from Aduthurai constituency in 1971 election.
