= P. Jeevanandham =

Indian politician

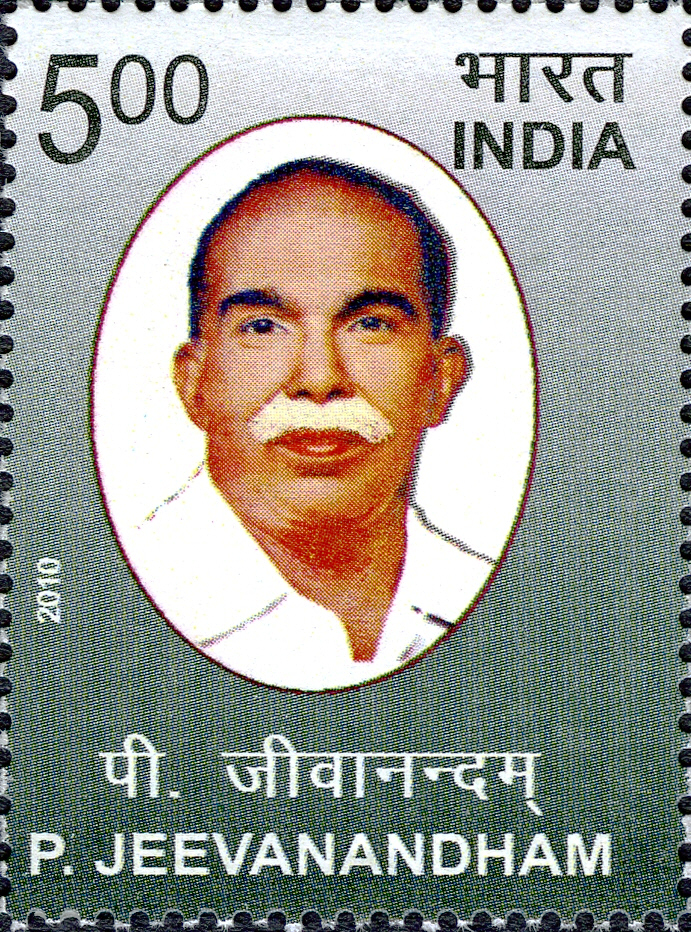
- Jeevanandham on a 2010 stamp of India
- Born: Sorimuthu; 21 August 1907; Boothapandi, Kingdom of Travancore, British India (now part of Kanyakumari District, Tamil Nadu, India)
- Died: 18 January 1963 (aged 55); Madras, Madras State (now Chennai, Tamil Nadu), India
- Education: Government School, Boothapandi, Kanyakumari district
- Known for: Communist Leader and Social Reformer
- Political party: Communist party of India

P. Jeevanandham (21 August 1907 – 18 January 1963), also called Jeeva, was a social reformer, political leader, litterateur, journalist, critic and one of the pioneers of the Communist and socialist movements in the state of Tamil Nadu, India.

== Early life ==
P. Jeevanandham was born in the town of Boothapandi, near Nagercoil, in the then princely state of Travancore (presently in Kanyakumari District of Tamil Nadu) into an orthodox middle-class family on 21 August 1907. His original name was Sorimuthu. He was named after his clan god Sorimuthu.

The orthodox and religious background of his family exposed Jeevanandham to literature, devotional songs and the arts, early on in his life. He grew up in an era when caste-based rigidity was widely prevalent, and from early on in his life he resented the idea of untouchability and could not tolerate his Dalit friends being denied entry into temples and public places. As a schoolboy, he became averse to Varnasrama Dharma, a Hindu religious code that stratifies society on caste lines and facilitates the practice of untouchability. The national movement and Gandhi’s call to wear khadi and his stand against untouchability influenced Jeevanandham to join the movement. He began wearing only khadi from then on.

Jeevanandham took his Dalit friends into the streets and public places where, usually, entry was denied to them, which earned him the displeasure of his family and orthodox caste members in his village. His father disapproved his behaviour and asked him to stop all things which were against their caste traditions. Jeevanandham said he would rather leave his home rather than follow discriminatory practices and eventually did so.

== Political life ==
=== Gandhian and Congress Worker ===
Jeevanandham started his political life basing himself on Gandhian ideas. In 1924, he participated in the Vaikom Satyagraha against upper-caste Hindus, where Dalits were barred from walking on the road leading to the temple at Vaikom. He participated in a similar protest, demanding entry for Dalits into the Suchindram temple. When he joined an ashram run by V. V. S. Aiyar at Cheranmadevi, he found that Dalits and ‘upper-caste’ students were fed in separate halls. He supported Periyar's protest against this practice and quit the ashram. Later, he took charge of an ashram funded by a philanthropist in Siravayal near Karaikkudi. The ashram life gave him an opportunity to read a lot of books. In this ashram, he got opportunity to meet Gandhi. Jeeva had written a letter to Gandhi disagreeing with his methods. When Gandhi came to Madras, he had this letter in his pocket and wanted to meet Jeeva. Rajagopalachari asked Gandhi to name the person he wanted to meet so that particular person can be called. Gandhi mentioned that he did not want the person to be called and would like to go to the ashram where Jeeva resided and meet him. When Gandhi went to the Siruvayal ashram and asked for Jeeva a young man of around 25 years appeared before him. Gandhi asked him if he was the same person who wrote the 'letter' and Jeeva replied in the affirmative.

When Periyar (Periyar E. V. Ramasamy), on returning from a visit to the Soviet Union, spoke highly of its achievements and expressed his desire to propagate socialism, Jeevanandham, who was by then familiar with the egalitarian principle, felt elated. His hopes of getting the national movement merged with the Congress Socialist Party were dashed when Periyar began dragging his feet. He, however, remained in the Congress. He was elected as a member of the All India Congress Committee, a prestigious post in those days, and was also a member of the working committee of the State Congress unit. Later, when the Madras Provincial Congress Socialist Party was formed in 1937, Jeevanandham became its first secretary. He joined the Communist Party of India (CPI) two years later along with P. Ramamurthi, another veteran of the movement.

=== Communist years (before Indian independence) ===
The last 25 years of colonial rule saw the emergence of two movements in Tamil Nadu – the Self-Respect Movement (which was a precursor to the Dravidian movement led by Periyar) and the Communist movement. Before enrolling himself as the first member of the CPI in Tamil Nadu, Jeevanandham was an active participant in these two earlier movements. His patriotism took him to the national movement; his revulsion toward untouchability and caste-based discrimination led him to support the Self-Respect Movement.

After joining the CPI, Jeevanandham and Ramamurthi organized rickshaw-pullers and factory workers on Marxist lines. In this they were assisted by leaders such as M. R. Venkatraman and B. Srinivasa Rao. They had already organized workers and formed unions in industrial towns such as Madurai and Coimbatore when they were functioning as socialists. Jeevanandham was in the forefront of efforts to build a strong labor movement based on Marxism. His oratory and writings helped him fulfill the task. But these leaders suffered police repression and were imprisoned several times. Jeevanandham visited sensitive areas and kept the workers’ fighting spirit alive. Alongside industrial workers, agricultural laborers and small farmers were also organized in Thanjavur and other districts. Jeevanandham and Ramamurthi inspired thousands of people through powerful speeches.

Under the colonial rule, Marxist literature and propaganda were banned, and Marxist workers were frequently arrested on one pretext or the other. Jeevanandham was no exception. He even had an externment order against him and had to stay away from the then Madras province for a brief period.

== Political life (after Indian independence) ==
After Indian Independence, the ban on the CPI was lifted, and all its leaders were released.

In the first general elections in post independent India, Jeevanandham won a seat for the Legislative Assembly from the Wasermanpet constituency in Madras. P. Ramamurthi, his close associate, who was in jail then, was also elected from the Madurai constituency. After being elected to the Legislative Assembly, he put pressure on the government to initiate action on issues relating to development schemes and reform measures. He also led many struggles, one of which was against the proposal to form Dakshina Pradesh comprising the four southern states. Despite his loss in the subsequent elections, he continued his party work.

== Tamil nationalism and literary works ==
He played a key role in making his native Tamil language an official language in the state and the judiciary, and a medium of instruction in educational institutions.

He was a supporter of pure usage of Tamil, which had, to an extent, become corrupted by the influence of Sanskrit and other languages. He declared his name to be "Uyirinban", a literal translation of the Sanskrit word Jeevanandham. One of his major influences was the works of the Tamil poet Subramania Bharati, and also Bharati's persona and simple lifestyle. Jeevanandham was the first to take to cultural politics and cited his long struggle for nationalising Subramania Bharati's songs.

He was well-versed in Tamil literature and was a good orator.

Jeevanandham was the founder of Thamara, a Tamil literary magazine. The Communist Tamil newspaper Jana Sakthi was also begun with his commitment.

Periyar encouraged Jeeva to translate Bhagat Singh’s classic essay "Why I am an Atheist" in 1933. He translated it into Tamil, which was probably its first-ever translation. It was published by Periyar's publication.

== Later years ==
Jeeva led a busy and hectic life: teaching classes on Marxism for party workers, advising students to equip themselves to meet the nascent republic's development needs, addressing literary fora on topics such as the greatness of the poet Bharati, explaining the flaws in the government's language policy at meetings of intellectuals, and addressing factory gate meetings in support of workers on strike. In between, he wrote editorials for the party daily or discussed strategies for resolving industrial disputes.

In 1962, his health suffered a setback. Later in the year he visited the Soviet Union. He took treatment there and returned by the end of the year. However, his health worsened weeks later. On 18 January 1963, he died at his modest home at Tambaram, near Chennai. About two lakh (200,000) people attended his funeral and paid their last respects to one who had toiled all his life for the common man, who symbolised the simplicity of Gandhism and who had a Periyar-like zest for social equality and the Marxist spirit to fight exploitation.

== Legacy ==
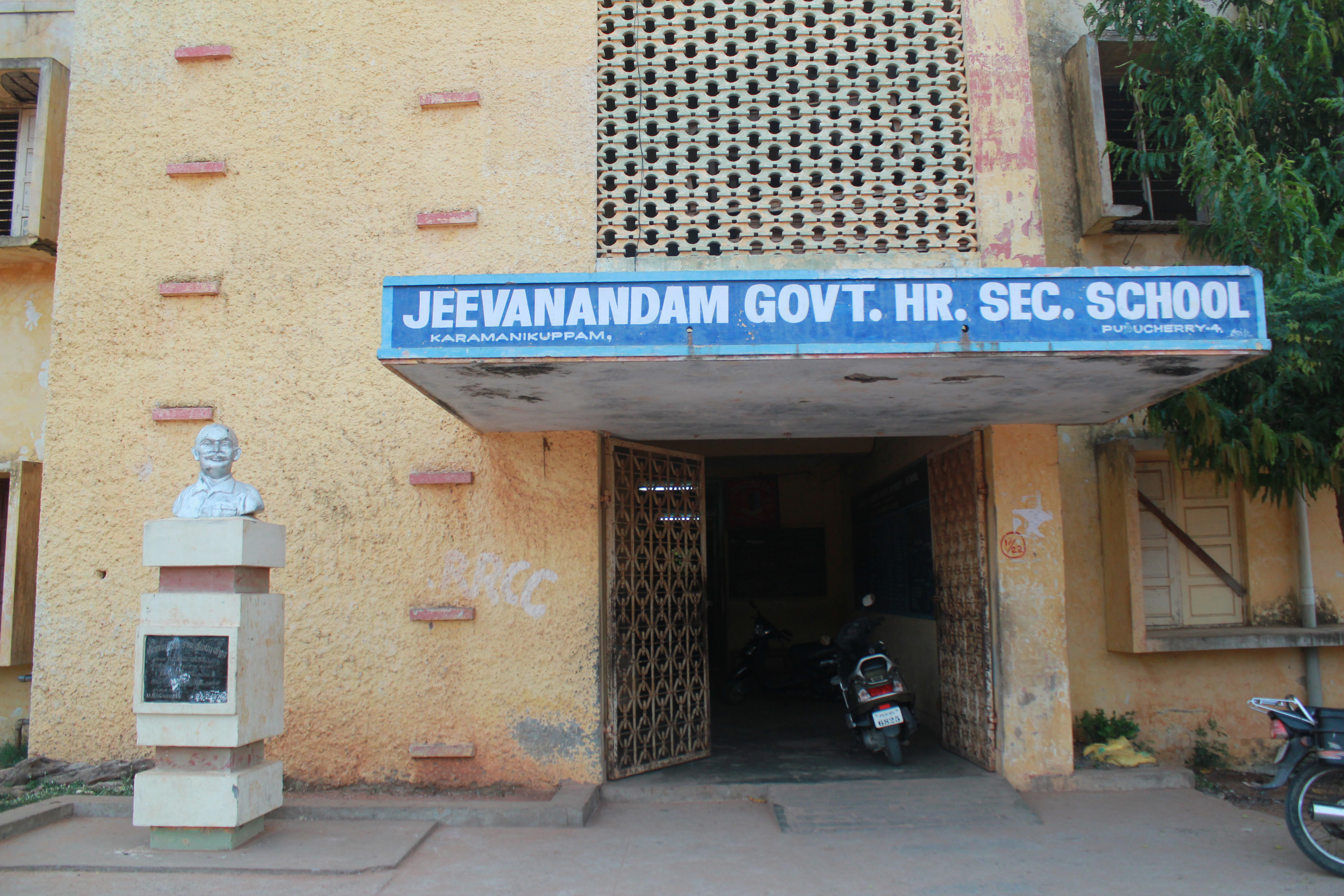
Jeevanandam Government Higher Secondary School, Puducherry

- The Tamil Nadu State Transport Corporation(TNSTC), Erode Division is named the Jeeva Transport Corporation in modern days.
- The railway station at Vyasarpadi in Chennai is named Vyasarpadi Jeeva, as he lived in the area for a period.
- A commemorative stamp on him was issued on 21-August-2010.
- Jeevanandam Government Higher Secondary School, Puducherry, is named after him.
- Jeevanandam Government Girls High School, Bhoothapandy, Kanyakumari district, is named after him

== Reputation ==
Even his political adversaries respected him. He led a justified and honest life. No one could criticize his personal life.

DMK leader C. N. Annadurai saw Jeeva walking down a road, and offered him a ride in his car. Jeeva thanked Annadurai but humbly refused his help.

When Communists were proscribed and subject to arrest, Jeeva took refuge in the home of N.S. Krishnan, a notable stage and cinema actor. Kalaignar Karunanidhi came to the house, and saw a sannyasi (Hindu renunciate) with a shaved head. He was suspicious of the sannyasi, trying to remember the well known face. N.S.Krishnan entered the room and asked Karunanidhi whether he could recognize the sannyasi. Later Karunanidhi recognized the sannyasi as Jeeva.

He and Rajaji were always political rivals but still respected each other.

He and K. Kamaraj were good allies. On his deathbed, Jeeva told his attendants "Telegram Padma Vathi [his wife]. Call Kamaraj." This shows how close these two leaders were.
