= L. Radhakrishnan =

Indian politician

L. Radhakrishnan is an Indian politician and presently serving Member of the Legislative Assembly of Tamil Nadu. He was elected to the Tamil Nadu legislative assembly as an Anna Dravida Munnetra Kazhagam candidate from Kovilpatti constituency in 2006 election.
