= M. Mayandi Nadar =

Indian politician

Member of the Madras State Assembly
- In office 1957 - 1962; 1962 - 1967
- Constituency: Washermanpet

Personal details
- Political party: Indian National Congress

M. Mayandi Nadar was an Indian politician and former Member of the Legislative Assembly of Tamil Nadu. He was elected to the Tamil Nadu legislative assembly from Washermanpet constituency as an Indian National Congress candidate in 1957, and 1962 elections.
