= Anbazhagan =

Anbazhagan (Tamil: அன்பழகன்) is a Tamil patronymic surname and given name. Notable people with the name include:

- J. Anbazhagan (1958–2020), Indian politician
- K. Anbazhagan (1922–2020), Indian politician
- M. Anbazhagan (born 1987), Indian film director and screenwriter
- T. Anbazhagan, Indian politician
