= S. Alagarsamy =

Indian politician (1926-2009)

S. Alagarsamy சோ. அழகர்சாமி
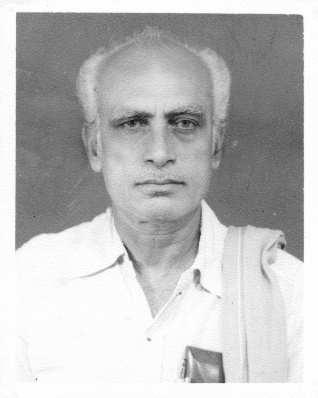

Member of the Madras State Assembly
- In office 1967–1984
- Constituency: Kovilpatti
- In office 1989–1991
- Constituency: Kovilpatti

Personal details
- Born: 5 August 1926 Ramanoothu, Tirunelveli Dist, Madras Province, British India
- Died: 6 March 2009 (aged 82) Ettayapuram, Tamil Nadu, India
- Party: Communist Party of India
- Spouse: A.Thayammal
- Children: A.Ramamurthy; A.Jeyabharathi; A.Ravindran; A.Geetharani

Soliah Alagarsamy (Tamil: சோ. அழகர்சாமி; 5 August 1926 – 6 March 2009) was an Indian politician and was elected as Member of the Legislative Assembly for 5 terms from 1967 to 1991 to the Tamil Nadu Legislative Assembly as a Communist Party of India candidate from Kovilpatti constituency in 1967, 1971, 1977, 1980 and 1989 elections.

== Early life ==
He was born on 5 August 1926 to A. Soliah and S.Koppammal in a village Ramanoothu, Tuticorin Dist, Tamil Nadu. Having lost his father at the age of 13, he had to take on the responsibilities of taking care of their agricultural farming. He and his younger brother S.Ramasamy were brought up by their widowed mother and aunt.

== Political career ==
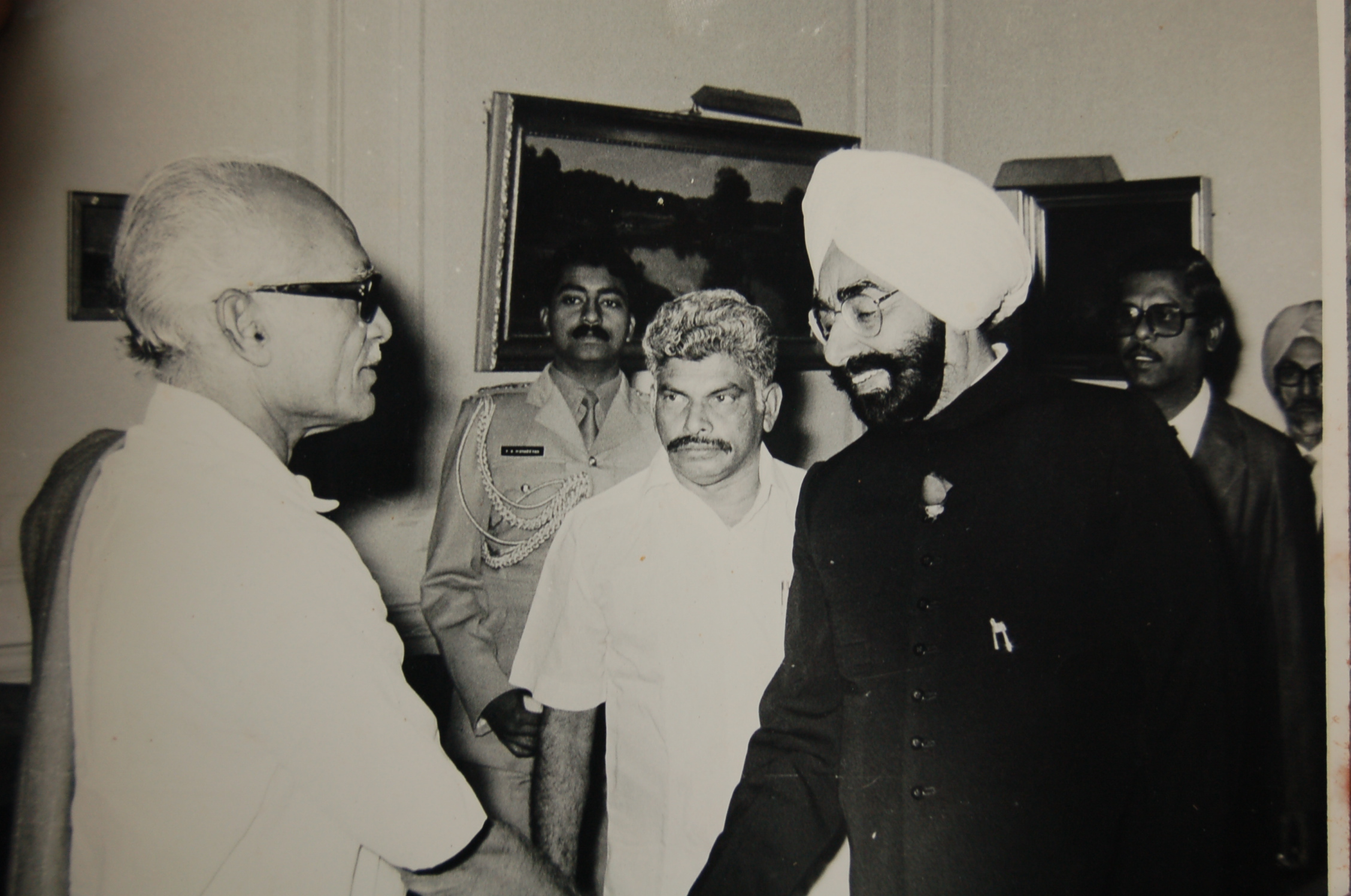
S. Alagarsamy with the President of India Hon Giani Zail Singh.

Alagarsamy first contested for Madras State Assembly in 1957 and continued to contest in all subsequent State General Assembly Elections till 1989 from Kovilpatti constituency Prior to that he contested for Unified Tirunelveli Jilla Board in 1952.

The then-unified Tirunelveli district consisted of the present Tirunelveli, Tuticorin, Kannayakumari Districts and part of Malabar and Ramnad District. He was leader of the CPI Legislative Group from 1971 till 1991 in The Tamil Nadu Legislative Assembly.

Thiru C.N.Annadurai was the Chief Minister of Tamil Nadu, when he was the Member of the Legislative Assembly in 1967 and subsequently he continued to be M.L.A, when Thiru V.R. Nedunchezhiyan, Thiru. M. Karunanidhi and Thiru M. G. Ramachandran, were the Chief Ministers of Tamil Nadu.

=== Electoral performance ===
1967 Madras Legislative Assembly election: Kovilpatti
Party	Candidate	Votes	%	±%
CPI	S. Alagarsamy	33,311	55.02%	+29.87
INC	V. O. C. A. Pillai	22,885	37.80%	+1.58
Independent	R. K. Thevar	3,709	6.13%	New
Independent	R. Chairman	641	1.06%	New
Margin of victory		10,426	17.22%	10.52%
Turnout		60,546	74.98%	−2.49%
Registered electors		84,101		
CPI gain from INC		Swing	18.80%	

1971 Tamil Nadu Legislative Assembly election: Kovilpatti
Party	Candidate	Votes	%	±%
CPI	S. Alagarsamy	38,844	62.16%	+7.14
INC	L. Subba Naicker	23,646	37.84%	+0.04
Margin of victory		15,198	24.32%	7.10%
Turnout		62,490	72.09%	−2.89%
Registered electors		92,524		
CPI hold		Swing	7.14%	

1977 Tamil Nadu Legislative Assembly election: Kovilpatti
Party	Candidate	Votes	%	±%
CPI	S. Alagarsamy	21,985	32.75%	−29.42
AIADMK	P. Seeniraj	21,588	32.15%	New
Margin of victory		397	0.59%	−23.73%
Turnout		67,140	63.06%	−9.03%
Registered electors		1,07,794		
CPI hold		Swing	-29.42%	

1980 Tamil Nadu Legislative Assembly election: Kovilpatti
Party	Candidate	Votes	%	±%
CPI	S. Alagarsamy	39,442	51.37%	+18.63
INC	V. Jeyalakshmi	30,792	40.11%	New
JP	S. Kalidas	6,281	8.18%	New
Margin of victory		8,650	11.27%	10.68%
Turnout		76,777	68.54%	5.48%
Registered electors		1,13,218		
CPI hold		Swing	18.63%	

1989 Tamil Nadu Legislative Assembly election: Kovilpatti
Party	Candidate	Votes	%	±%
CPI	S. Alagarsamy	35,008	35.34%	+0.72
DMK	S. Radhakrishnan	31,724	32.02%	New
Independent	A. Palpandian	13,981	14.11%	New
Independent	S. Dharmar	6,462	6.52%	New
Independent	M. S. Iyyadurai	4,759	4.80%	New
Independent	V. Anandasamy	3,263	3.29%	New
India Farmers and Tailers Party	R. P. Ramasamy	2,742	2.77%	New
Margin of victory		3,284	3.31%	−17.82%
Turnout		99,069	70.34%	−1.44%
Registered electors		1,43,671		
CPI gain from INC		Swing	-20.41%	

== Public offices ==
He held various public offices in Kovilpatti Taluk for many years. He also served on the board of directors in various co-operative organisations and banks. He was a member of the District Development Council for Tirunelveli and Tuticorin Districts. He was head of the Tamil Nadu Kishan Sabha organisation and Vice President of All India Kishan Sabha. He served in various Tamil Nadu Government Legislative Committees. He served as State Executive Committee Member and State Control Committee President of Communist Party of India.
