= M. G. Ramachandran =

Indian actor and politician (1917–1987)

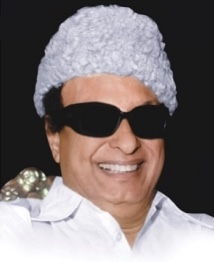

3rd Chief Minister of Tamil Nadu
- In office 9 June 1980 – 24 December 1987
- Governor: Prabhudas B. Patwari; S. L. Khurana
- Cabinet: Ramachandran II; Ramachandran III
- Preceded by: President's rule
- Succeeded by: V. N. Janaki Ramachandran (Note: V. R. Nedunchezhiyan served as acting chief minister in the interim for 14 days.)
- Constituency: Madurai West; Andipatti
- In office 30 June 1977 – 17 February 1980
- Governor: Prabhudas B. Patwari
- Cabinet: Ramachandran I
- Preceded by: President's rule
- Succeeded by: President's rule
- Constituency: Aruppukottai

Member of the Tamil Nadu Legislative Assembly
- In office 24 December 1984 – 24 December 1987
- Chief Minister: Himself
- Political Party: AIADMK
- Preceded by: S. S. Rajendran
- Succeeded by: P. Aasiyan
- Constituency: Andipatti
- In office 9 June 1980 – 15 November 1984
- Chief Minister: Himself
- Political Party: AIADMK
- Preceded by: T. P. M. Periyaswamy
- Succeeded by: Pon. Muthuramalingam
- Constituency: Madurai West
- In office 30 June 1977 – 17 February 1980
- Chief Minister: Himself
- Political Party: AIADMK
- Preceded by: Sowdi Sundara Bharathi
- Succeeded by: M. Pitchai
- Constituency: Aruppukottai
- In office 1 March 1967 – 31 January 1976
- Chief Minister: C. N. Annadurai; M. Karunanidhi
- Political Party: DMK; AIADMK
- Preceded by: position established
- Succeeded by: position abolished
- Constituency: St. Thomas Mount

Member of the Tamil Nadu Legislative Council
- In office 30 March 1962 – 7 July 1964
- Chief Minister: K. Kamaraj; M. Bhaktavatsalam
- Succeeded by: S. R. P. Ponnuswamy Chettiar

General Secretary of the All India Anna Dravida Munnetra Kazhagam
- In office 17 October 1986 – 24 December 1987
- Preceded by: S. Raghavanandam
- Succeeded by: J. Jayalalithaa
- In office 17 October 1972 – 22 June 1978
- Preceded by: position established
- Succeeded by: V. R. Nedunchezhiyan

Treasurer of the Dravida Munnetra Kazhagam
- In office 27 July 1969 – 10 October 1972
- President: M. Karunanidhi
- General Secretary: V. R. Nedunchezhiyan
- Preceded by: M. Karunanidhi
- Succeeded by: K. Anbazhagan

President of the South Indian Artistes' Association
- In office 1961–1963
- Preceded by: R. Nagendra Rao
- Succeeded by: S. S. Rajendran
- In office 1957–1959
- Preceded by: N. S. Krishnan
- Succeeded by: Anjali Devi

Personal details
- Born: Maruthur Gopalan Menon Ramachandran; 17 January 1917 Nawalapitiya, British Ceylon (present-day Kandy District, Central Province, Sri Lanka)
- Died: 24 December 1987 (aged 70) Madras (now Chennai), Tamil Nadu, India
- Cause of death: Cardiac arrest
- Resting place: M.G.R. and Amma Memorial
- Party: All India Anna Dravida Munnetra Kazhagam (1972–1987)
- Other political affiliations: Dravida Munnetra Kazhagam (1953–1972); Indian National Congress (1935–1945)
- Spouses: Chitarikulam Bhargavi (m. 1939; died 1942); Sadanandavati (m. 1942; died 1962); V. N. Janaki (m. 1962)
- Relatives: M. G. Chakrapani (brother); Papanasam Sivan (uncle-in-law)
- Profession: Actor; film director; film producer; politician; philanthropist
- Awards: Bharat Ratna (1988); National Film Award for Best Actor (1971)
- Nicknames: Makkal Thilagam; Ponmana Chemmal; Puratchi Thalaivar; Vaathiyar; Idhayakani

Maruthur Gopalan Ramachandran (17 January 1917 – 24 December 1987), popularly known by his initials M. G. R., was an Indian politician, actor, film director, film producer and philanthropist who served as the chief minister of Tamil Nadu from 1977 until his death in 1987. He was the founder and first general secretary of the political party All India Anna Dravida Munnetra Kazhagam (AIADMK). He is regarded as one of the most influential politicians of post-independent India, and was known by the epithets Makkal Thilagam (Jewel of the People) and Puratchi Thalaivar (Revolutionary Leader). In March 1988, he was posthumously awarded the Bharat Ratna, India's highest civilian honour.

Born in British Ceylon in 1917, Ramachandran's family later emigrated to India. In his youth, he joined the drama troupe to support the family. After a few years of acting in plays, he made his debut in the Tamil film industry with Sathi Leelavathi in 1936. In a career spanning more than five decades, he acted in more than 135 films, majority of them in Tamil. He was regarded as one of the three biggest male actors of Tamil cinema during the period alongside Sivaji Ganesan and Gemini Ganesan. He won the National Film Award for Best Actor in 1971, three Tamil Nadu State Film Awards, and three Filmfare Awards South.

Ramachandran became part of the Indian National Congress in the late 1930s. In 1953, he became a member of the C. N. Annadurai-led Dravida Munnetra Kazhagam (DMK). He rose through its ranks based on his popularity as a film star. In 1972, three years after Annadurai's death, he left the DMK to establish AIADMK. He steered the AIADMK-led alliance to victory in the 1977 assembly election, defeating the DMK in the process, and was sworn in as the chief minister of Tamil Nadu. Except for a four-month interregnum in 1980, he remained as chief minister until his death in 1987 and led the AIADMK to electoral wins in the 1980 and 1984 elections.

In October 1984, Ramachandran was diagnosed with renal failure caused by diabetes, which led to further health problems. Despite undergoing a renal transplant and subsequent treatment at the United States, his condition worsened. He died on 24 December 1987 in his residence in Ramapuram due to a cardiac arrest. On 25 December 1987, his remains were buried at the northern end of the Marina beach, where the MGR Memorial was constructed later. In December 2006, a life-size statue of Ramachandran was unveiled in the Indian Parliament. India Post has released several stamps in his honour, and several establishments and places have been named in his honour including the Chennai Central railway station.

== Early life ==
Ramachandran was born on 17 January 1917 in Nawalapitiya, Kandy District, British Ceylon (now in Sri Lanka) in a Malayali Nair family to Melakkath Gopalan Menon and Maruthur Satyabhama. His family hailed from Palakkad region in the modern-day Indian state of Kerala. His father worked as a magistrate in Kandy, and moved back to India with his family after retirement. He was the youngest of the two sons, and his elder brother was Chakrapani. Ramachandran's father died when he was two and a half years old. Soon after the death of his father, his sister also died due to ill health. After his father's death, their relatives did not support the family, and his mother moved to her brother's house in Kumbakonam. His mother worked as a housemaid to put both her sons through school.

During his school days, Ramachandran joined a drama troupe called Boys Company. He trained himself in various aspects, and took on different roles. With help from Kandasamy Mudaliar, he had a brief acting stint overseas in Rangoon and Singapore, where he took up female roles. He returned to India to rejoin Boys Company, and started playing lead roles.

== Acting career ==
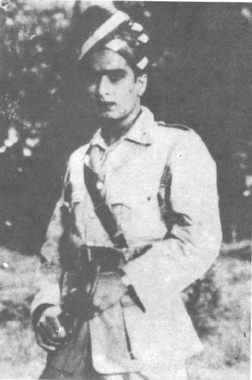
Ramachandran in his debut film Sathi Leelavathi

Ramachandran made his film debut in 1936, in the film Sathi Leelavathi, directed by Ellis R. Dungan, an American-born film director. He followed it with minor appearances and supporting roles in many films. During his early film career, Ramachandran was addressed by his co-stars as "Chinnavar" (the younger one) to distinguish him from his elder brother, Chakrapani, who also worked in the film industry. He worked for over a decade in various films before he played his first lead role in Rajakumari, which was commercially successful. Ramachandran later delivered various hit films such as Manthiri Kumari and Maruthanad Elavarasee in 1950. He established himself as an action hero in Tamil cinema with Manthiri Kumari (1950) and Marmayogi (1951). His popularity rose with the success of En Thangai (1952) and Malaikkallan (1954).

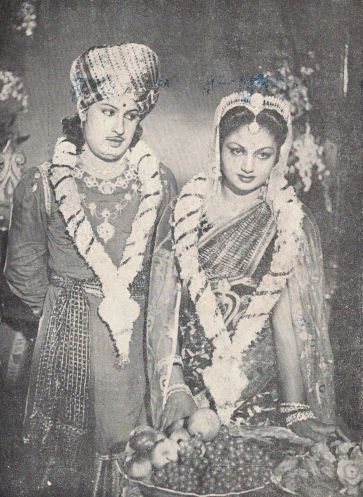
Ramachandran with Janaki in Mohini (1948)

Ramachandran's 1955 film Alibabavum 40 Thirudargalum was the Tamil film industry's first-ever full-length gevacolor film. He acted further in commercially successful films such as Madurai Veeran (1956), Chakravarthi Thirumagal and Mahadevi (both released in 1957). He also directed few films, and his first film as a director and producer was Nadodi Mannan (1958), which became a blockbuster. He later starred in Kalai Arasi (1963), which featured a storyline of aliens visiting the earth. The following year, he appeared in Thozhilali and Padagotti. After starring in numerous commercially successful films, he held a matinée idol status in Tamil Nadu. In 1960, MGR declined the Padma Shri honour, stating that he could not accept an invitation written in the Devanagari script, consistent with his adherence to Dravidian ideology and advocacy of the Tamil language.

Ramachandran was shot in 1967, which permanently changed his voice. His first film to release after his release from the hospital was Arasakattalai, which had been finished earlier. However, he was shooting for the film Kaavalkaaran, when he was shot, and the film had parts featuring his old and new voices across scenes.

Ramachandran won the Tamil Nadu State Film Award for Best Actor for the film Kudiyirundha Koyil in 1968 and the National Film Award for Best Actor for Rickshawkaran in 1972. His 1973 film Ulagam Sutrum Valiban was one of the first Tamil films to be filmed abroad, and broke the previous box office records of his films. He later acted in successful films like Netru Indru Naalai (1974), Idhayakkani (1975), and Indru Pol Endrum Vaazhga (1977). His acting career ended in 1978 with his last film being Madhuraiyai Meetta Sundharapandiyan.

Ramachandran remarked there was no question of retirement for anyone associated in whichever capacity with the cine field. Kali N. Rathnam, a pioneer of Tamil stage drama, and K. P. Kesavan were mentors of Ramachandran in his acting career. Ramachandran was often paired with actresses B. Saroja Devi, and J. Jayalalithaa. Jayalalithaa, who later followed him into politics, acted with him in 28 films, with the last film being Pattikaattu Ponnaiya in 1973.

== Early political career ==
Ramachandran was a member of the Indian National Congress till 1953. In 1953, he joined the Dravida Munnetra Kazhagam (DMK), founded by C. N. Annadurai, and became a prominent member of the party. He became a member of the Madras State Legislative Council in 1962.

=== 1967 assassination attempt ===
On 12 January 1967, M. R. Radha, an actor who had appeared in several films alongside Ramachandran, visited him to discuss a future film. During the conversation, Radha stood up, shot Ramachandran near his left ear, and then attempted to shoot himself. The bullet was lodged behind the first vertebra, and Ramachandran underwent a surgery to remove the bullet. However, a piece of the bullet was left behind as the doctors were apprehensive that it would cause further damage if attempted to be removed.

As a consequence of the surgery, he lost hearing in his left ear and his voice was altered permanently. The bullet piece left behind got dislodged later, and was removed safely. He was hospitalised for six weeks and was visited by commoners and people from the film industry, polity and bureaucracy. He conducted his campaign for the 1967 assembly elections from the hospital bed, and was elected to the legislative assembly for the first time. Radha was later sentenced to five years in prison for the incident, and died in 1979.

=== Differences with Karunanidhi and birth of AIADMK ===
Flag of All India Anna Dravida Munnetra Kazhagam

After the death of his mentor Annadurai, he became the treasurer of the DMK in 1969 after he helped Karunanidhi became the chief minister of the state and president of the party. However, in the early 1970s, the growing popularity of Ramachandran caused a rift with the DMK president and chief minister Karunanidhi. Ramachandran played a key role in the victory of the DMK in the 1971 assembly elections.

Later in the same year, when the DMK government led by Karunanithi wanted to repel the law that was in effect in Tamil Nadu, Ramachandran launched a staunch opposition to it. In 1972, Ramachandran accused that corruption had grown in the DMK after the demise of Annadurai, and demanded the ministers to publicly declare their assets. As a consequence, Ramachandran was expelled from the party temporarily on 10 October 1972, and permanently four days later. On 17 October 1972, Ramachandran became the leader and general secretary of All India Anna Dravida Munnetra Kazhagam (AIADMK), established by Anakaputhur Ramalingam. He continued to act in films and used cinema as a medium to spread his political messages. He submitted a Memorandum to the President of India on 4th November 1972 requesting a appointment of commission to look into various allegations (that he had made in the annexure to the memorandum) against Karunanidhi, cabinet of Ministers and DMK district secretaries.

== Chief ministership and continued success ==
=== First term (1977–1980) ===
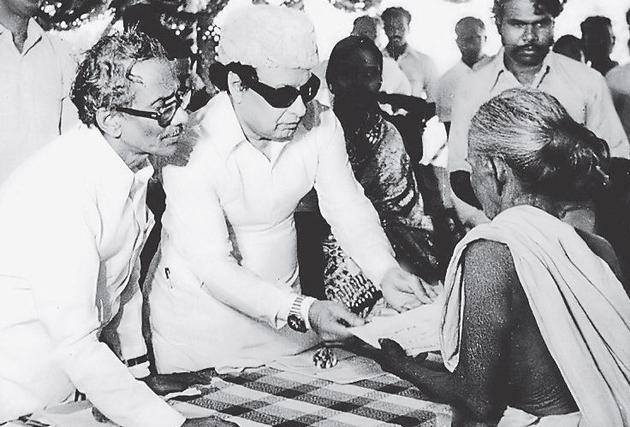
M. G. Ramachandran collecting the petitions from the public

The AIADMK, led by Ramachandran, allied with Congress (I) for the 1977 parliamentary election. Though the combine won 34 of the 39 seats in Tamil Nadu, the Janata party won the election and Morarji Desai became the Prime Minister of India. However, Ramachandran later extended unconditional support to the Janata party government. In the 1977 Tamil Nadu assembly elections, AIADMK allied itself with the Communist Party of India (Marxist), and was part of a four cornered contest against the DMK, the Congress (O) and the Janata Party. The AIADMK-led alliance won the elections by winning 144 seats out of 234 and Ramachandran became the chief minister of Tamil Nadu on 30 June 1977.

Indira Gandhi, the leader of Congress (I) leader, sought re-entry into the Parliament after her expulsion from it on 19 December 1978. She considered contesting Thanjavur by-election in Tamil Nadu, scheduled for 17 June 1979, following the resignation of the AIADMK member S. D. Somasundaram, and sought the support of Ramachandran. Ramachandran, who had reportedly agreed to support her during a meeting in New Delhi on 19 May 1979 with Congress leader G. K. Moopanar, later withdrew his backing citing law-and-order concerns.

In July 1979, after the fall of the Desai-led government, Ramachandran extended his support to the newly formed Charan Singh-led government at the centre, and Aravinda Bala Pajanor and Satyavani Muthu from the AIADMK became part of the Union Cabinet. Karunanidhi claimed in two separate interviews, in April 2009 and in May 2012, that Ramachandran was ready for the merger of his party, AIADMK, with the DMK in September 1979, with Biju Patnaik acting as the mediator. However, the plan failed to materialise as Panruti S. Ramachandran, a close confidante of Ramachandran, acted as a spoiler and Ramachandran later changed his mind. After the fall of the Charan Singh-led government in January 1980, fresh parliamentary elections were called for. The AIADMK–Janata party alliance won only two seats in the elections, with the remaining 37 seats won by the DMK–Congress (I) coalition. Subsequently, the AIADMK-led government was dismissed and the Tamil Nadu assembly was dissolved by the central government led by the Congress in February 1980.

==== Policies ====
"On the five spheres including state welfare, language rights, the two-language policy and social justice, We (DMK and AIADMK) will certainly remain as Anna's double-barrel gun (Irattai kuzhal tuppaki)."

— Ramachandran, during Chief Minister's Reply to motion of thanks on the Governor's first address of the 6th Tamil Nadu Assembly, 15 July 1977

In 1978, Ramachandran's government introduced the "one lamp" (oru vilakku) schme which provided free electricity and a government-funded electric lamp for ₹10 (equivalent to ₹300 or US$3.20 in 2026) to eligible dwellings measuring up to 20 ft × 10 ft (6.1 m × 3.0 m). In the same year, the state government introduced the 10+2 system of education by abolishing the PUC and moving higher secondary education to school, based on advice from then education minister C. Aranganayagam. His government also improved educational infrastructure with the addition of laboratories in government schools and improved rural access to schools. The rise in demand for college education led the government to encourage private engineering colleges, with further policies enacted to reserving at least half of the seats in such colleges under an open quota and restricting capitation fees. In July 1979, Ramachandran's government introduced a ₹9,000 (equivalent to ₹250,000 or US$2,700 in 2026) family income ceiling as an economic criterion for availing reservation in educational institutions and later advocated extending reservation to all categories, including the general category, on economic grounds, rather than caste basis. The policy was opposed by Dravidar Kazhagam, with the support of the DMK, and on 21 January 1980, the government withdrew the order and announced an increase in the reservation quota for backward classes to fifty per cent.

=== Second term (1980–1985) ===
In the 1980 Tamil Nadu assembly elections, the DMK–Congress combined failed to win despite their victory in the earlier 1980 Lok Sabha polls, and the AIADMK, led by Ramachandran, won the election. Ramachandran was sworn in as chief minister for the second time on 9 June 1980.

In the by-election held for the Tiruppattur assembly constituency on 29 November 1981, following the death of the incumbent legislator from the Congress, Ramachandran announced that the AIADMK would not contest and would instead offer support to the opposition Congress. While Ramachandran cited a "democratic principle" that the party which originally won the seat should retain it in the event of a vacancy, the decision was criticised by the Communist Party of India as "politics of convenience" and political commentator Cho Ramaswamy viewed it as an attempt to revive ties with then ruling Congress at the centre.

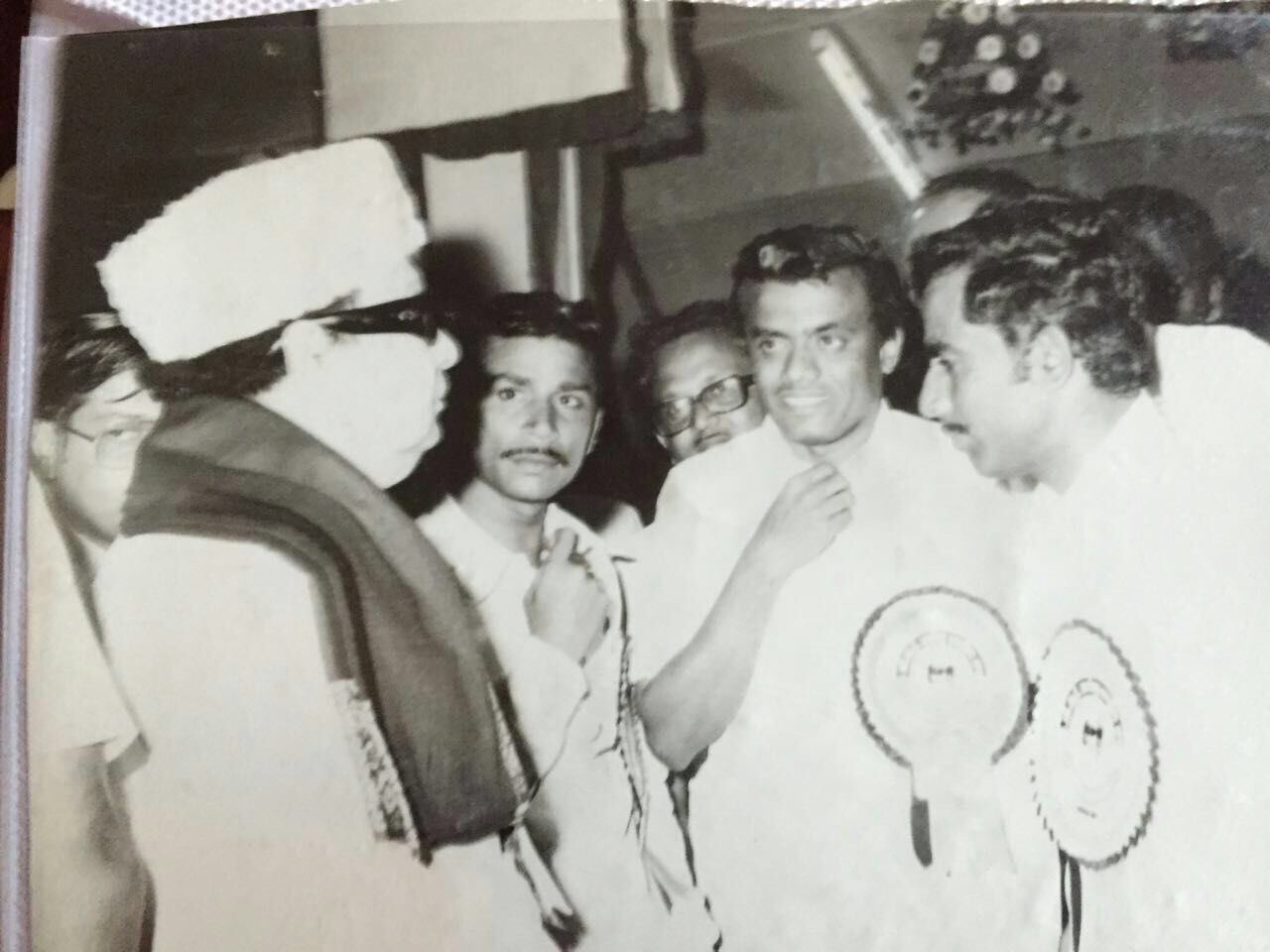
Ramachandran with his party colleagues

In February 1983, Ramachandran undertook a fast at Marina Beach, alleging that the central government, led by Indira Gandhi, had failed to supply adequate food grains to Tamil Nadu. The move drew criticism from the Congress and the DMK, who alleged it was a political diversion from the case involving the theft of the golden vel at the Tiruchendur Murugan Temple and the subsequent death of a government official, and aimed at influencing the impending by-election to the Tiruchendur constituency. Ramachandran subsequently visited New Delhi to meet the prime minister, after which he ended his fast, as the issue was reportedly sorted out.

In the first week of October 1984, Ramachandran fainted while attending a ceremony at the Brihadeeswarar Temple in Thanjavur. On 5 October 1984, he was hospitalised due to respiratory distress and renal impairment. The government released regular health updates, while V. R. Nedunchezhiyan performed the function of the chief minister in the interim. Later, Ramachandran was diagnosed with kidney failure as a result of uncontrolled diabetes, which was soon followed by a heart attack and stroke. He was flown to the United States on 5 November 1984, and underwent a kidney transplant at the Downstate Medical Center in New York City on 19 December 1984, with his niece Leelavathy donating one of her kidneys.

While Ramachandran was hospitalised, Indian prime minister Indira Gandhi was assassinated on 31 October 1984, and her son Rajiv Gandhi succeeded her. Rajiv called for fresh elections, and the Ramachandran-led AIADMK allied with Rajiv's Congress for the 1984 Indian general election. Indira Gandhi's assassination, Rajiv Gandhi's visits to the state and Ramachandran's ill health helped create a sympathy wave that helped the AIADMK-Congress alliance sweep the elections with the AIADMK winning 12 seats.

==== Inter-state water diplomacy ====
MGR employed personal diplomacy to address inter-state water disputes. During the 1980 Cauvery water shortage, he made an unannounced visit to meet the ailing Karnataka Chief Minister Ramakrishna Hegde in Bengaluru. During the breakfast meeting, when offered a glass of water after a bout of hiccups, MGR remarked that Tamil Nadu too needed water for Kuruvai cultivation, following which Karnataka released Cauvery water to the state before his return to madras. He later secured further releases, including an electricity-for-water arrangement with Karnataka. During another shortage, MGR hosted Karnataka Chief Minister R. Gundu Rao, an admirer of MGR, for breakfast in Chennai and raised the issue. After returning to Bengaluru, Rao directed maintenance work at the Krishnaraja Sagar Dam, facilitating the release of Cauvery water to Tamil Nadu. MGR also persuaded Andhra Pradesh Chief Minister N. T. Rama Rao to launch the Telugu Ganga Project, which supplied Krishna River water to meet Chennai's drinking water needs.

==== Policies ====
In August 1980, the Tamil Nadu Police launched Operation Ajantha, a year-long anti-Naxalite operation, which resulted in the killing of 19 Naxalites, and limited the spread of Naxalism in Tamil Nadu, as their influence was expanding across the region.

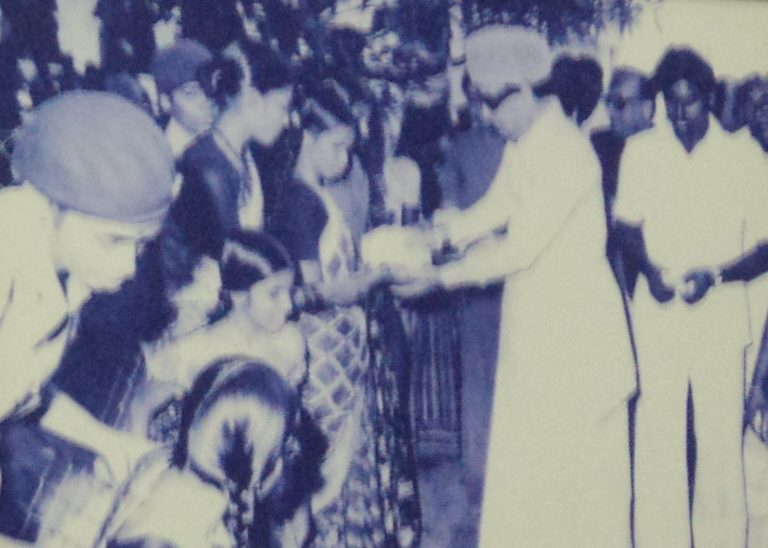
Ramachandran greeting people and receiving gifts on the Independence day ceremony on 15 August 1982

On 13 November 1980, the state government promulgated an ordinance abolishing the posts of traditional village officers, which were often hereditary roles, and replaced them with village administrative officers, who would be recruited through competitive examinations. The displaced officers were opposed to this and media reports indicated that government records had to be obtained by force from these officers in a few places. Later, revenue minister S. D. Somasundaram announced that ₹50 million (equivalent to ₹1.3 billion or US$13 million in 2026) would be provided as compensation for the 24,000 village officers affected by the rule. In April 1981, Ramachandran urged the central government to declare Thirukkural as the national scripture of India.

Ramachandran allowed the continued sale of liquor in the state, which he had opposed when the ban on which was overturned by his predecessor Karunanidhi in 1971. He rescinded the ban on toddy in 1981, however, the decision was reversed six years later. He later established the Tamil Nadu State Marketing Corporation in 1983 for the import and sale of foreign made liquor.

In the early 1980s, there were several instances of clashes between Hindus and Christians in Kanyakumari district, with the tensions escalated on 1 March 1982 during the Mondaicaud Amman Temple festival, which resulted in a police firing, and the deaths of six people and injuries to several others. The unrest soon spread to several areas, resulting in additional casualties, and destruction of property. Ramachandran later visited Mondaicaud and the state government appointed a judicial commission, headed by judge Venugopal, to investigate the incident. The government later issued an order on 29 April 1986 based on the report of the Venugopal commission, to constitute a committee of senior officials to curb antisocial elements that incite violence by creating communal, religious, and political tensions in the state.

The Midday Meal Scheme for school students, which had been introduced in 1956 during the tenure of K. Kamaraj, was significantly expanded by Ramachandran in July 1982. It was expanded to cover all government and aided schools for all the days of the year including holidays. In 1983, Ramachandran proposed relocating the state capital from Chennai to Tiruchirappalli, citing the drought and drinking water crisis in Chennai. The proposal was later shelved following opposition from various quarters, including within his own party. The government introduced a free electricity scheme for small and marginal farmers in 1984.

=== Third term (1985–1987) ===
Despite flailing health, Ramachandran contested the 1984 assembly election while still confined to the hospital, and won from Andipatti. During the election, photos of Ramachandran recuperating in hospital were published widely in the media, which helped create a sympathy wave amongst the people. In the elections, the AIADMK–Congress combine won 195 of the 234 seats in the assembly. Following his recovery, Ramachandran returned from the United States on 4 February 1985 and was sworn in as the chief minister, for the third time, on 10 February. He remained in the chief minister's office till 24 December 1987. MGR attended his final public function at Kathipara Junction on 21 December 1987, alongside Prime Minister Rajiv Gandhi and his wife Sonia Gandhi. Despite his impaired voice, MGR delivered a 15-minute speech at the ceremony, where Rajiv unveiled a statue of Jawaharlal Nehru. On 23 December, After drinking his usual glass of buttermilk and retiring around 22:00 IST, he suffered a cardiac arrest. Doctors were unable to revive him and at approximately 3:00 IST MGR died of cardiac arrest at his Ramavaram Garden residence in the early hours of 24 December 1987, aged 70. He had spent the previous evening preparing for a reception for President R. Venkataraman. His death came as the state government was preparing to inaugurate Dr. M.G.R. Medical University in his honour. Thousands gathered at his residence following the news, and V. R. Nedunchezhiyan was sworn in as interim Chief Minister, succeeding MGR.

== Policies and governance ==
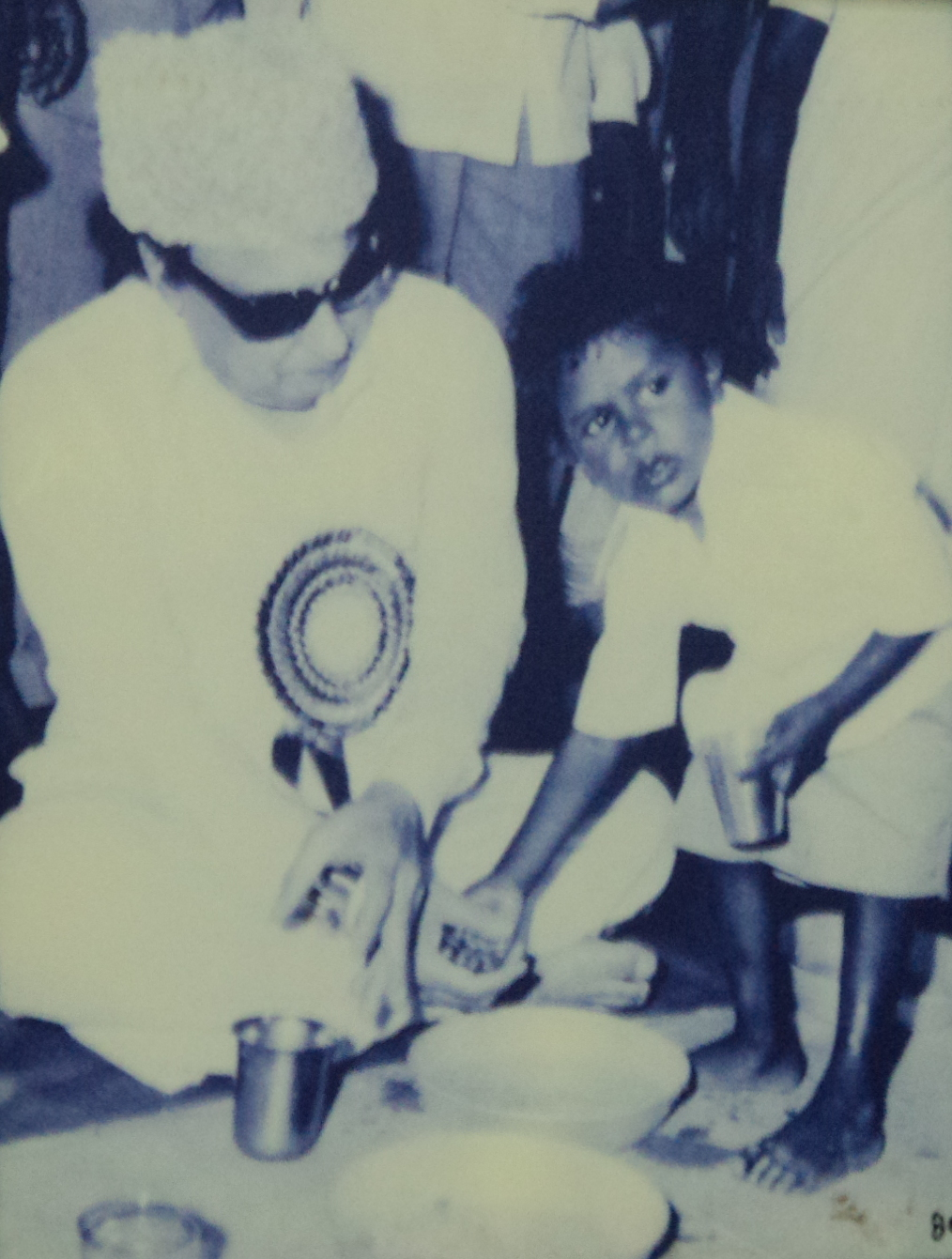
Ramachandran during a Midday Meal Scheme event

Ramachandran was very popular in Tamil Nadu and had high approval from the public. He introduced and expanded welfare schemes and enacted several populist measures. His charisma and popularity often trumped policy decisions and led to his eventual success during his tenure as chief minister.

The decision-making was often centralised during Ramachandran's tenure. While there was criticism regarding the efficiency of such a system, supporters of Ramachandran countered that this was a result of the party members serving Ramachandran's interests rather than theirs. Ramachandran's charisma and popularity trumped policy decisions that led to his eventual success during his tenure as chief minister. The decade-long rule of Ramachandran was marked by an increase in institutional corruption, tensions between the executive and judiciary, and the proliferation of short-term populist welfare schemes. There was a dilution of the Dravidian rhetoric, including a moderation of anti-Hindi sentiments. As per a study by the Madras Institute of Development Studies in 1988, Ramachandran's tenure saw a lower economic growth than the national average, and limited improvement in essential services, in large due to the shift of government resources to social welfare schemes. Ramachandran's government often used the state machinery against political criticism and censored the media. In April 1987, S. Balasubramanian, the editor of Ananda Vikatan, was sentenced to three months in jail and A.M. Paulraj of Vaniga Otrumai, was ordered to serve a two month jail term by the state legislative assembly, for writing against the government. However, they were later released after cases were filed against the legality of the arrest in the courts

Natwar Singh, who served as the minister of state in the external affairs ministry in the mid 1980s, in his autobiography One Life is Not Enough, alleged that Ramachandran covertly supported the cause of independent Tamil Eelam and Liberation Tigers of Tamil Eelam (LTTE), a militant organisation in Sri Lanka. He alleged that the LTTE cadres were given military training in Tamil Nadu, and that Ramachandran had gifted ₹40 million (US$430,000) to the group without the knowledge of the Indian government.

== Elections results ==
Tamil Nadu Legislative Assembly

Elections	Assembly	Constituency	Political party	Result	Vote percentage	Opposition		
Elections	Assembly	Constituency	Political party	Result	Vote percentage	Candidate	Political party	Vote percentage
1967	4th	St. Thomas Mount	DMK	Won	66.67%	T. L. Raghupathy	INC	32.57%
1971	5th	St. Thomas Mount	DMK	Won	61.11%	T. L. Raghupathy	INC(O)	38.10%
1977	6th	Aruppukottai	AIADMK	Won	56.23%	M. Muthuvel Servai	JP	17.87%
1980	7th	Madurai West	AIADMK	Won	59.61%	Pon. Muthuramalingam	DMK	37.59%
1984	8th	Andipatti	AIADMK	Won	67.40%	Thangaraj	DMK	31.22%

== Positions held ==
Elections	Position	Constituency	Term in office		
Elections	Position	Constituency	Assumed office	Left office	Time in office
1962	Member of the Legislative Council	—N/a	30 March 1962	7 July 1964	2 years, 99 days
1967	Member of the Legislative Assembly	St. Thomas Mount	15 March 1967	5 January 1971	3 years, 296 days
1971	Member of the Legislative Assembly	St. Thomas Mount	22 March 1971	31 January 1976	4 years, 315 days
1977	Chief Minister of Tamil Nadu	Aruppukottai	30 June 1977	17 February 1980	2 years, 232 days
1980	Chief Minister of Tamil Nadu	Madurai West	9 June 1980	9 February 1985	4 years, 245 days
1984	Chief Minister of Tamil Nadu	Andipatti	10 February 1985	24 December 1987	2 years, 317 days

== Illness and death ==
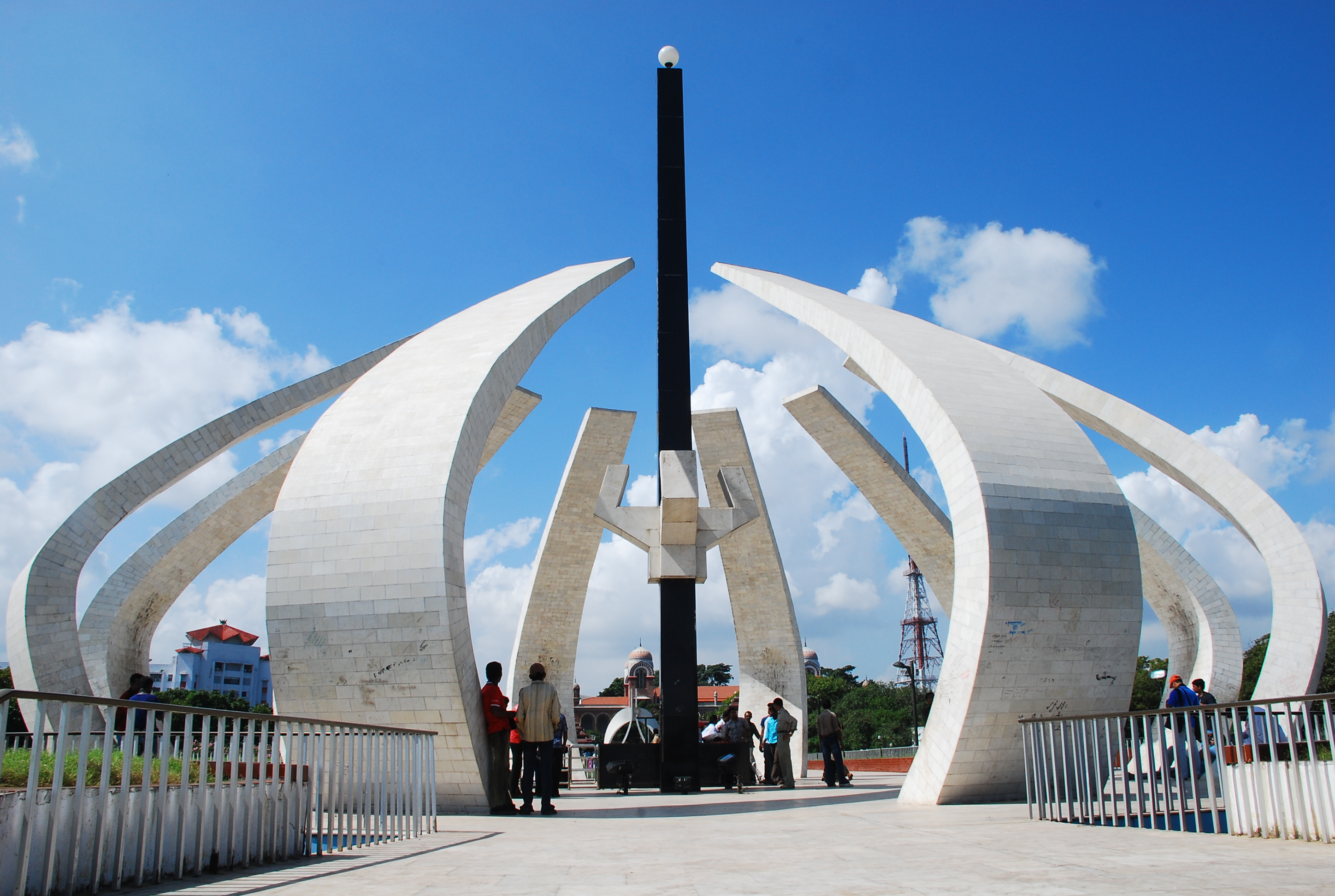
MGR Memorial at Marina beach in Chennai

From the time of his hospitalisation in October 1984, Ramachandran's health continued to worsen over the next three years, and he had frequent trips to the United States for treatment. He never fully recovered from his health issues and died on 24 December 1987 at 3:30 am in his Ramavaram Garden residence in Manapakkam at the age of 70. His body was kept in state at Rajaji Hall for two days for public viewing. On 25 December 1987, his remains were buried at the northern end of the Marina beach, now called MGR Memorial, adjacent to the Anna Memorial. Around one million people were estimated to have attended his funeral.

Ramachandran's death sparked a frenzy of public rioting over the state, and various shops, cinemas, buses and other public and private property became the target of the violence. The police were given shoot-at-sight orders to bring the situation under control. Schools, colleges and various establishments announced holidays due to the situation. The state of affairs continued for almost a month across Tamil Nadu. Some women allegedly shaved their heads bald, and dressed like widows. A few whipped or self immolated themselves. Violence during the funeral alone left 129 people dead and 47 police personnel wounded.

== Personal life ==
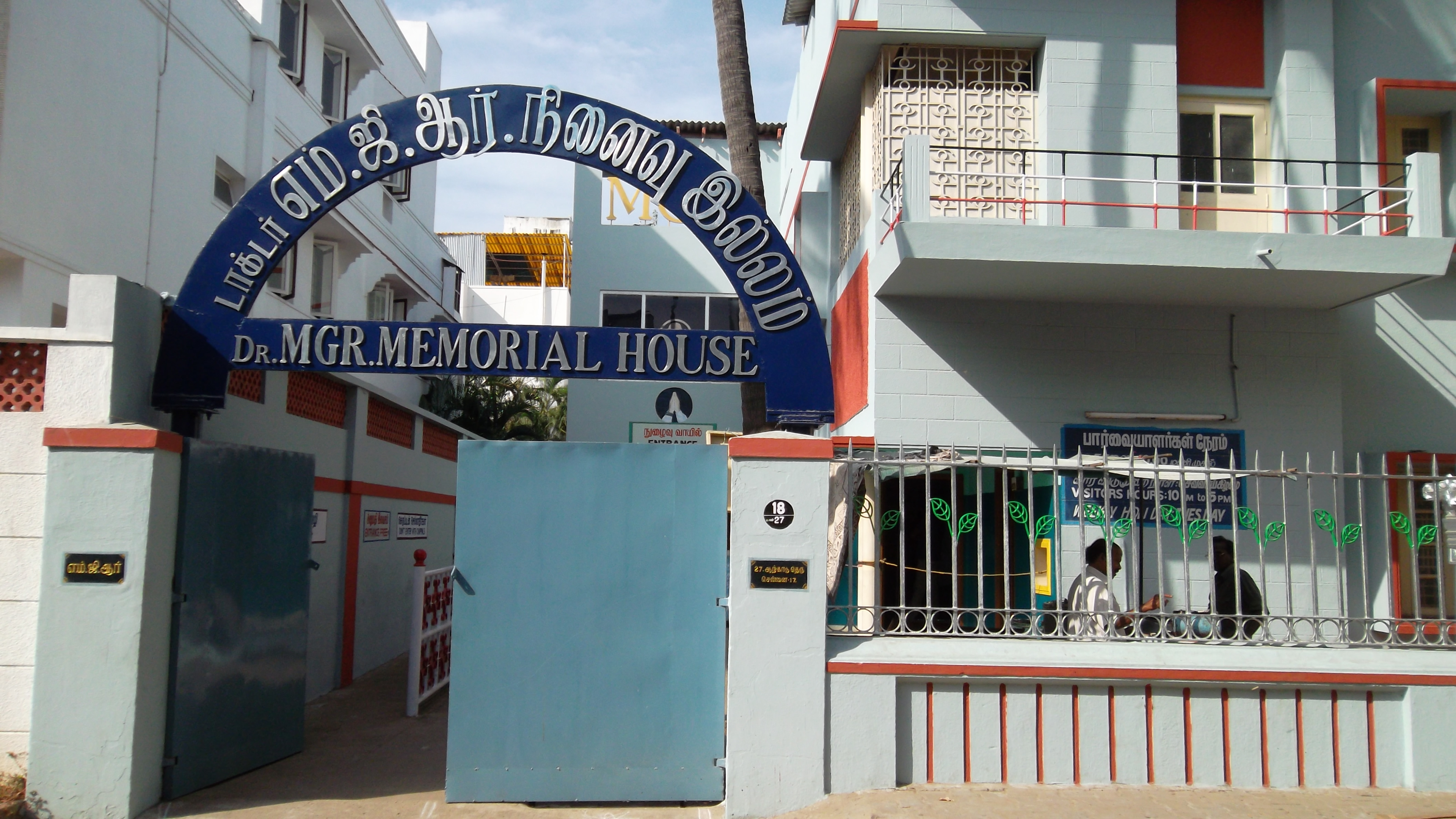
Ramachandran's erstwhile house at T. Nagar in Chennai

In 1939, Ramachandran married Chitarikulam Bhargavi alias Thangamani,who later died in 1942 due to an illness. In late 1942, he married Sadanandavati, who died later due to tuberculosis in 1962. In 1962, same year after his second wife death he married actress V. N. Janaki, who later became the chief minister of Tamil Nadu after his death. He had no biological children from any of his marriages.

In his early days, Ramachandran was a devout Hindu and a devotee of Murugan and his mother's favourite god, Guruvayurappan. After joining the DMK, he identified himself as a rationalist. He gifted a golden sword weighing half a Kilogram to Mookambika temple in Kollur, Udupi district.

Ramachandran was the founder and editor of Thai weekly magazine and Anna daily newspaper in Tamil. He established Sathya Studios and Emgeeyar Pictures. He offered personal financial donations during disasters and calamities, and donated Rs. 75,000 to the war fund during the Sino-Indian War.

== Legacy and honours ==
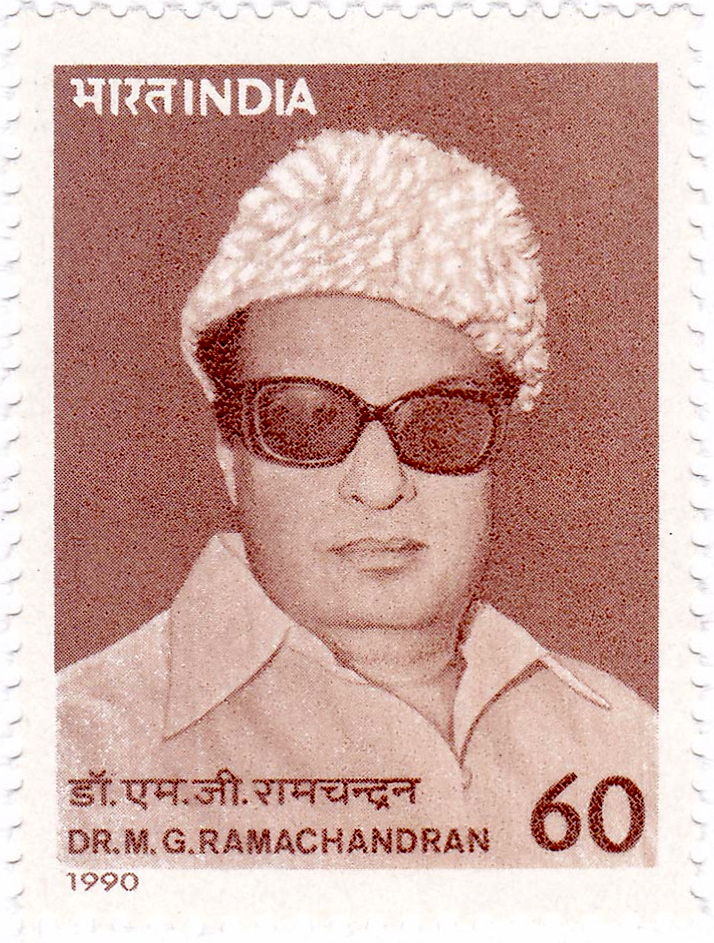
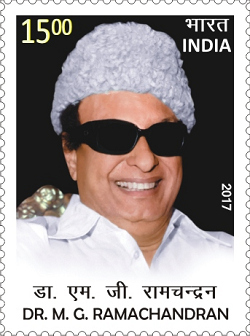
Ramachandran memorial stamps released by India Post in 1990 (left) and 2017

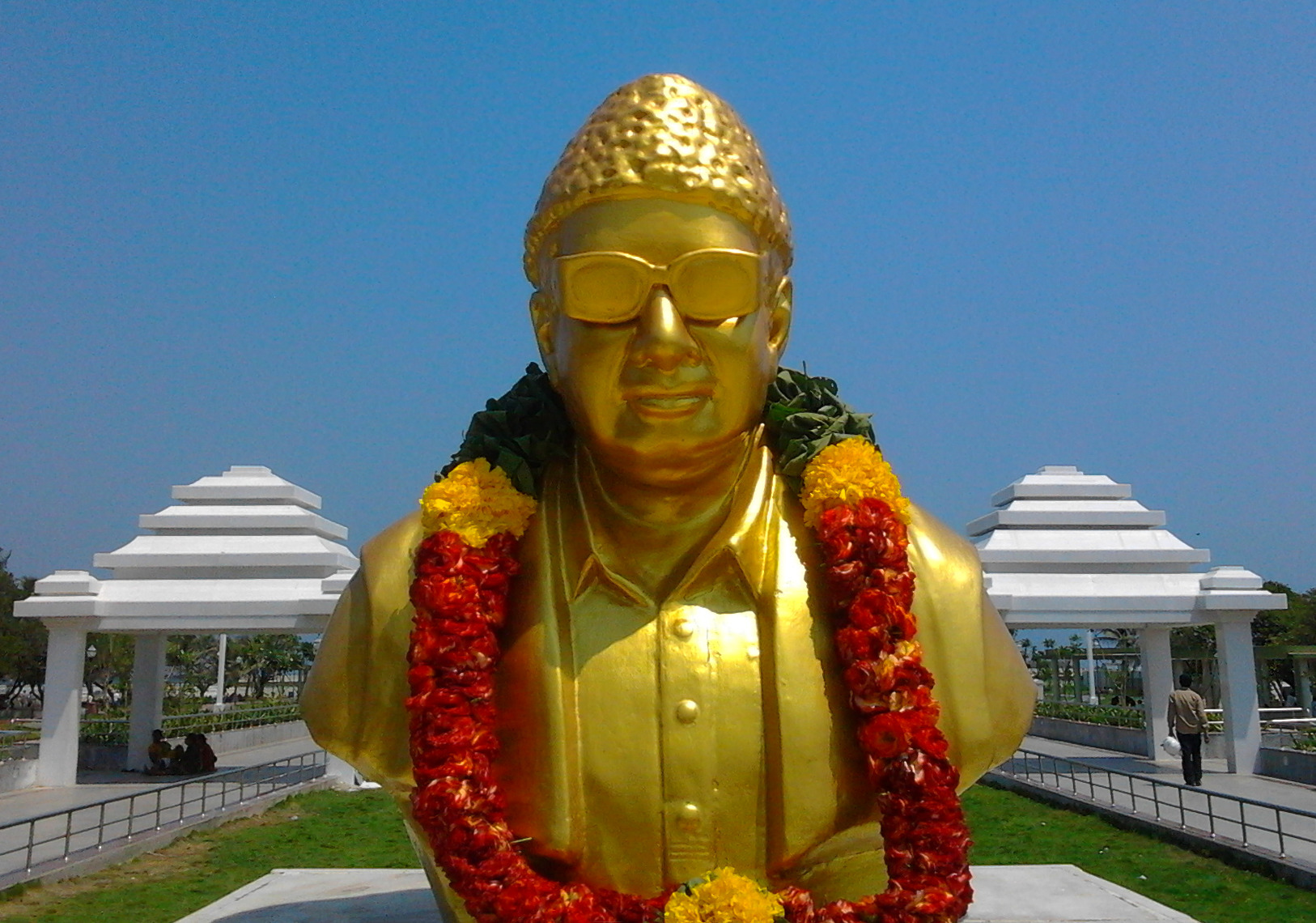
Ramachandran's statue at the MGR Memorial in Chennai

Ramachandran generally began all his speeches with the phrase En rathathin rathamana udan pirappukkale ("Blood of my blood, my fellow siblings"). He is widely known by the epithets "Makkal Thilagam" (Jewel of the People), "Puratchi Thalaivar" (Revolutionary Leader), and "Ponmana Chemmal" (Generous one) in Tamil Nadu.

Ramachandran was awarded honorary doctorates by The World University in 1974 for his contributions to Indian cinema, and the University of Madras in 1987 for his contributions to public affairs. On 19 March 1988, Ramachandran was posthumously honoured with Bharat Ratna, India's highest civilian honour. He became the third chief minister of the state to receive the award after C. Rajagopalachari and K. Kamaraj. The timing of the award was controversial, and his opponents criticised the central government led by Congress under Rajiv Gandhi to have influenced the decision to give the award to help win the upcoming 1989 Lok Sabha election.

In 1989, Dr. M. G. R. Home and Higher Secondary School for the Speech and Hearing Impaired was established at his erstwhile residence in Ramapuram, Chennai, in accordance with his last will and testament written in January 1987. His official residence located at 27, Arcot Street, Thyagaraya Nagar was converted into a memorial house and opened for public viewing. The Dr. MGR-Janaki College of Arts and Science for Women was established in a part of the land that housed Sathya Studios.

A life-size statue of Ramachandran was unveiled on 7 December 2006 in the Parliament House by then Lok Sabha Speaker Somnath Chatterjee. To commemorate Ramachandran's birth centenary in 2017, the Reserve Bank of India issued Rs. 100 and Rs.5 coins that bore his image as a portrait along with an inscription mentioning the event.

Several localities, roads, places, and establishments have been named in his honour. MGR Nagar, a residential neighbourhood in Chennai was named after him. Chennai Mofussil Bus Terminus, Salem Central Bus Stand, Tirunelveli New Bus Stand, and M.G.R. Bus Stand at Madurai are named after him. On 5 April 2019, Government of India renamed the Chennai Central railway station as Puratchi Thalaivar Dr. M.G. Ramachandran Central Railway Station to honour him. On 31 July 2020, Central Metro station of the Chennai Metro was renamed after Ramachandran. On 17 October 2021, the AIADMK headquarters in Royapettah was renamed as Puratchi Thalaivar M.G.R. Maaligai by party leaders in memory of the party's founder.

=== Film awards ===
Year	Event	Category	Film	Conferred by
1971	19th National Film Awards	Best Actor in a Leading Role	Rickshawkaran	Government of India
1968	2nd Tamil Nadu State Film Award	Best Actor	Kudiyirundha Koyil	Government of Tamil Nadu
1969	3rd Tamil Nadu State Film Award	Best Film	Adimai Penn	Government of Tamil Nadu
1978	12th Tamil Nadu State Film Award	Special Award	Madhuraiyai Meetta Sundharapandiyan	Government of Tamil Nadu
1965	13th Filmfare Awards South	Special Award – South	Enga Veettu Pillai	Filmfare
1969	17th Filmfare Awards South	Best Film – Tamil	Adimai Penn	Filmfare
1973	21st Filmfare Awards South	Special Award – South	Ulagam Sutrum Valiban	Filmfare

== In popular culture ==
Ramachandran's autobiography, "Naan Yaen Piranthen? (Why Was I Born?)", was published in 2003.

The 1997 Tamil film Iruvar, by Mani Ratnam, is based on the rivalry and friendship between Ramachandran and Karunanidhi. Mohanlal played Anandan, the character based on Ramachandran. In the 2019 web series Queen, Indrajith Sukumaran portrayed G. M. Ravichandran, the fictional adaptation of Ramachandran. In the Tamil film Thalaivii (2021), Ramachandran was portrayed by Arvind Swamy.

The 2026 Tamil feature film Vaa Vaathiyaar is based on his larger-than-life screen persona which inspires events in the film.

== See also ==
- M. G. Ramachandran's unrealised projects

== Notes ==
Political offices
Vacant President's Rule Title last held by M. Karunanidhi	Chief Minister of Tamil Nadu; 1977–1987	Succeeded by V. N. Janaki Ramachandran
