= Maruthanad Elavarasee =

1950 film by A. Kasilingam

- Theatrical release poster
- Directed by: A. Kasilingam
- Written by: M. Karunanidhi
- Produced by: G. Muthuswamy
- Starring: M. G. Ramachandar; V. N. Janaki
- Cinematography: G. Dorai
- Edited by: A. Kasilingam
- Music by: M. S. Gnanamani
- Production companies: G. Govindan & Company
- Distributed by: G. Govindan & Company
- Release date: 2 April 1950
- Running time: 136 minutes
- Country: India
- Language: Tamil

Maruthanad Elavarasee or Maruthanattu Ilavarasi (transl. Princess of the Marudha Kingdom) is a 1950 Indian Tamil-language film directed and edited by A. Kasilingam, and written by M. Karunanidhi. The film stars M. G. Ramachandran (credited as Ramachandar) and V. N. Janaki. It was released on 2 April 1950 and became a box office success.

== Plot ==
Chithra is one of a king's two wives. The minister Dhurjeyan's sister is the younger queen. The two become pregnant and Dhurjeyan persuades the king that the older queen has poisoned the younger queen out of jealousy which the king tends to believe, but does not take any action. Dhurjeyan tries to kill the younger queen but she is saved by a courtier whom Dhurjeyan kills. The younger queen escapes many trials and gives birth to a son named Kandeeban. He grows up and meets a young woman Rani and her friend and falls in love unaware that she is a princess. Their love grows and when he discovers that she is a princess, he begins to distance himself from her. After many trials, the couple reunites.

== Cast ==
Male cast

- M. G. Ramachandar as Kandeeban
- Pulimootai Ramasami Iyer as Azhagu
- M. G. Chakarapani as Minister Dhurjeyan
- Battling C. S. D. Singh
- P. S. Veerappa as King
- N. S. Narayana Pillai
- T. M. Ramasami Pillai
- Kottapuli Jayaraman
- Vishnu Ramasami Iyengar
- S. M. Thirupathi

Female cast

- V. N. Janaki as Princess Rani
- C. K. Saraswathi as Queen Chithra
- C. K. Nagarathnam as Rani's friend
- K. Meenakshi as Veerathayai Pannivom

Dance

- Lalitha-Padmini

== Production ==
In 2015, lyricist P. K. Muthusamy claimed he wrote a story and gave it to M. Karunanidhi in December 1949, but Karunanidhi "stole" the story and made it into Maruthanad Elavarasee without Muthusamy's knowledge. However, according to M. G. Ramachandran (known and credited as Ramachandar at that time), T. V. Chari began work on a film titled Kaali Dasi as producer, director and writer, but it was shelved after some progress due to the production company dissolving. Ramachandar added that G. Govindan & Company took over production with A. Kasilingam as director and Karunanidhi as writer, retaining some of the already shot scenes but using them to weave a new story. The new film, titled Maruthanad Elavarasee, was produced by G. Muthuswamy, and Kasilingam also handled the editing while cinematography was handled by G. Dorai.

== Soundtrack ==
The music composed by M. S. Gnanamani, while lyrics written by C. A. Lakshmana Das & K. P. Kamatchi Sundaram.

Song title	Singers	Lyrics	Length
"Endruindha Nilai"			
"Indha Inbame Thandha Paingili"			
"Kallam Illa Ullam"	K. V. Janaki &		04:10
"Malarathiye Malarum"			
"Nadhiye Neeraazhi"	M. M. Mariyappa & K. V. Janaki		03:07
"Raajaa Bayam Pochudhe"	M. M. Mariyappa &		03:10
"Thaaye Dayadhari"	K. V. Janaki		03:00
"Veerathaayai Pannivom"	P. Leela		03:55
"Virindhvaarayo"			
"Sindhaikkinbame"	M. M. Mariyappa		03:04
"En Jenmamae Pothuma"	K. V. Janaki		03:46

== Release and reception ==
Maruthanad Elavarasee was released on 2 April 1950. The film became a box office success and, according to historian Randor Guy, established Ramachandar and Janaki as a "star pair sure to go places".
