= Operation Ajantha =

Anti Naxal operation by Tamil Nadu police in India

Operation Ajantha was a significant anti-Naxal operation conducted by Tamil Nadu police in the Vellore district of Tamil Nadu. The operation was led by Walter Devaram, then Deputy Inspector General of Police (DIG) for the erstwhile North Arcot district

== Background ==
In the early 90s, Vellore, South Arcot & Dharmapuri districts were the most affected regions of Tamil Nadu due to Naxalite violence.

On August 6, 1980, Tirupattur Police Inspector Palaniswamy and his team arrested dreaded Naxalites — Anbu Sivalingam, Perumal, Rajappa, Selvam, and Chinnathambi — who were hiding in the Yelagiri Hills. While they were being transported back to the police station in a car, Sivalingam threw a hand grenade inside the vehicle, killing everyone on board, including the police officers and his fellow Naxalite members. Sivalingam managed to escape from the police & went on hiding in state of Andhra Pradesh

== Police Operation ==
This incident sent shockwaves across the state. Then Chief Minister of the state, M. G. Ramachandran, visited the funeral of the Inspector Palaniswamy & announced Operation Ajanta named after Palanisamy's six-year-old daughter Ajanta. The operation which lasted one year resulted in death of 19 naxalites prominent Naxals Kannamani, Rathinavel, Anbu, Irutupatchai. This early step against naxalism helped Tamil Nadu stay naxal free though the bordering state of Andhra suffered severely due to Naxalite attacks.

== Aftermath ==
In 2009, The fugitive Anbu Shivalingam, who was absconding in Andhra Pradesh was arrested by Villupuram police after 29 years. Trail court sentenced him to five life sentences and 10 years of rigorous imprisonment for possession of a bomb, all to be served concurrently.

With Walter Devaram's initiative, a commemorative pillar was installed at the Tirupattur Town Police Station in honour of the four police personnel who were martyred in the bomb attack. Every year on August 6, both police and the public pay tribute to the martyrs.
