= Dr. MGR-Janaki College of Arts and Science for Women =

College in Tamil Nadu, India

- Motto: Excellence through Diligence
- Type: Self financing
- Established: 1996; 30 years ago
- Academic affiliations: University of Madras
- Principal: R. Manimekalai
- Faculty: 160
- Total staff: 215
- Location: 11&13, Durgabai Deshmuk Road, Chennai 600028, Chennai, Tamil Nadu, India; 13.0170°N 80.2610°E
- Campus: Urban
- Website: www.mgrjanaki.ac.in

Dr. MGR-Janaki College of Arts and Science for Women is a college for women in the Sathyabama MGR Maligai Campus in Chennai. It was established in 1996.

V. N. Janaki Ramachandran, former Chief Minister of Tamil Nadu, help found the college in memory of her husband Bharat Ratna Dr. M.G. Ramachandran, and is currently managed and administered by the Directors of Sathya Studios Private Limited.

== Affiliation and accreditation ==
The courses offered by the college are affiliated to the University of Madras. The college received permission from the Government of Tamil Nadu and is affiliated to the University of Madras. It is known for its academic and co-curricular activities.

The motto of the college is "Excellence through Diligence."

== Photos ==
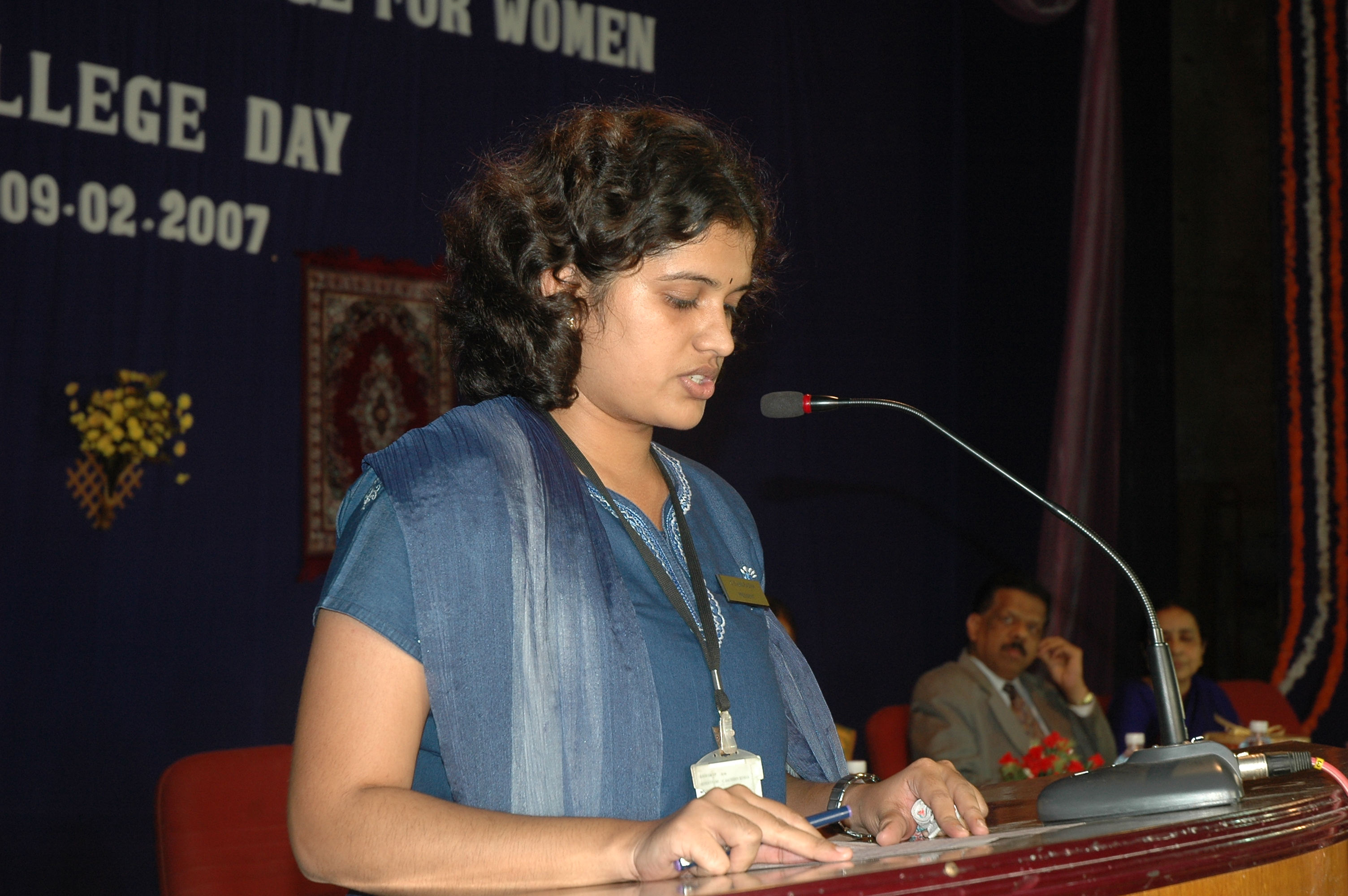
Senate President Anu addressing the students

College Day 2007

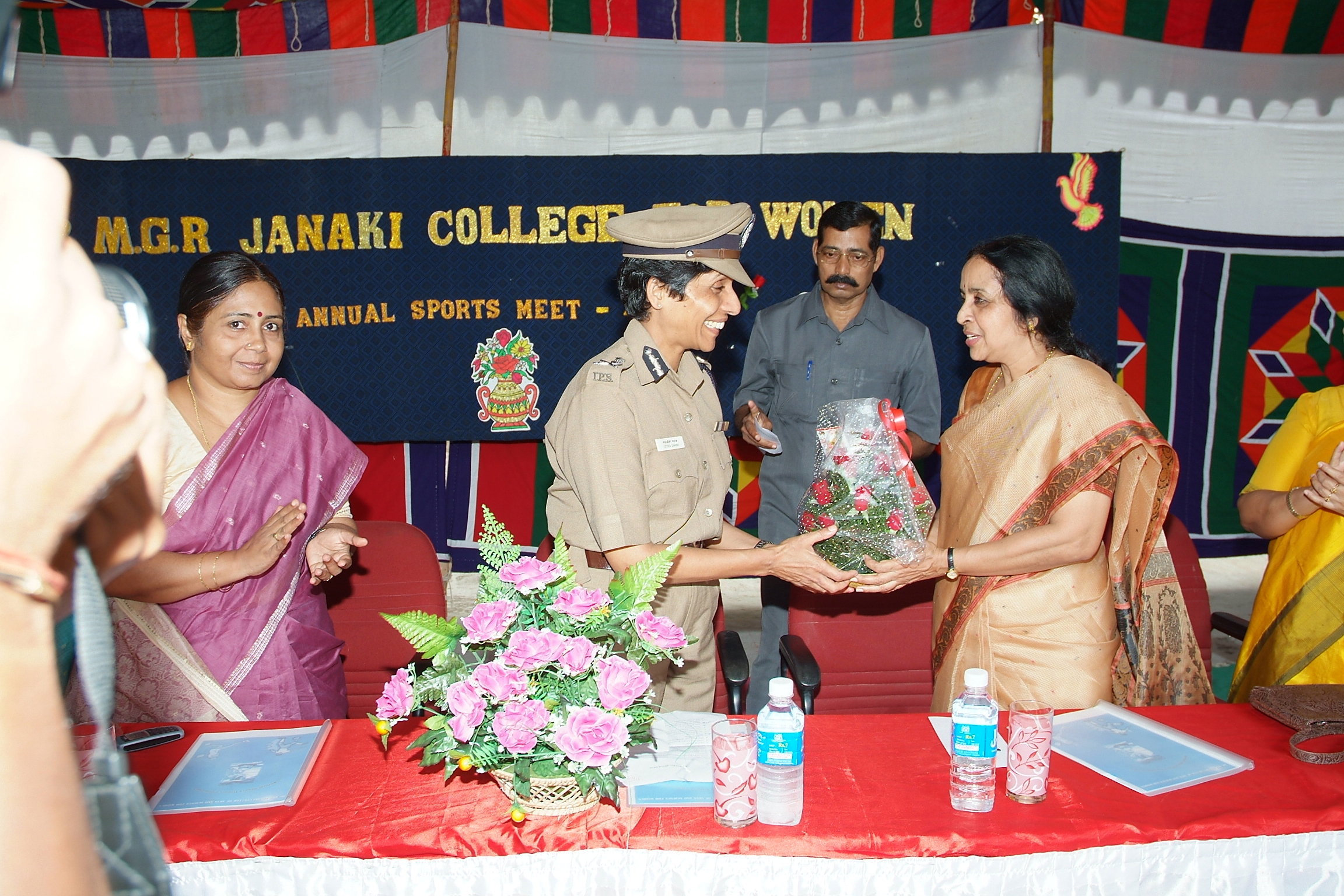
Commissioner Lathika Charan in Sports Day 2007

His Excellency the Governor of Tamil Nadu in convocation 2007

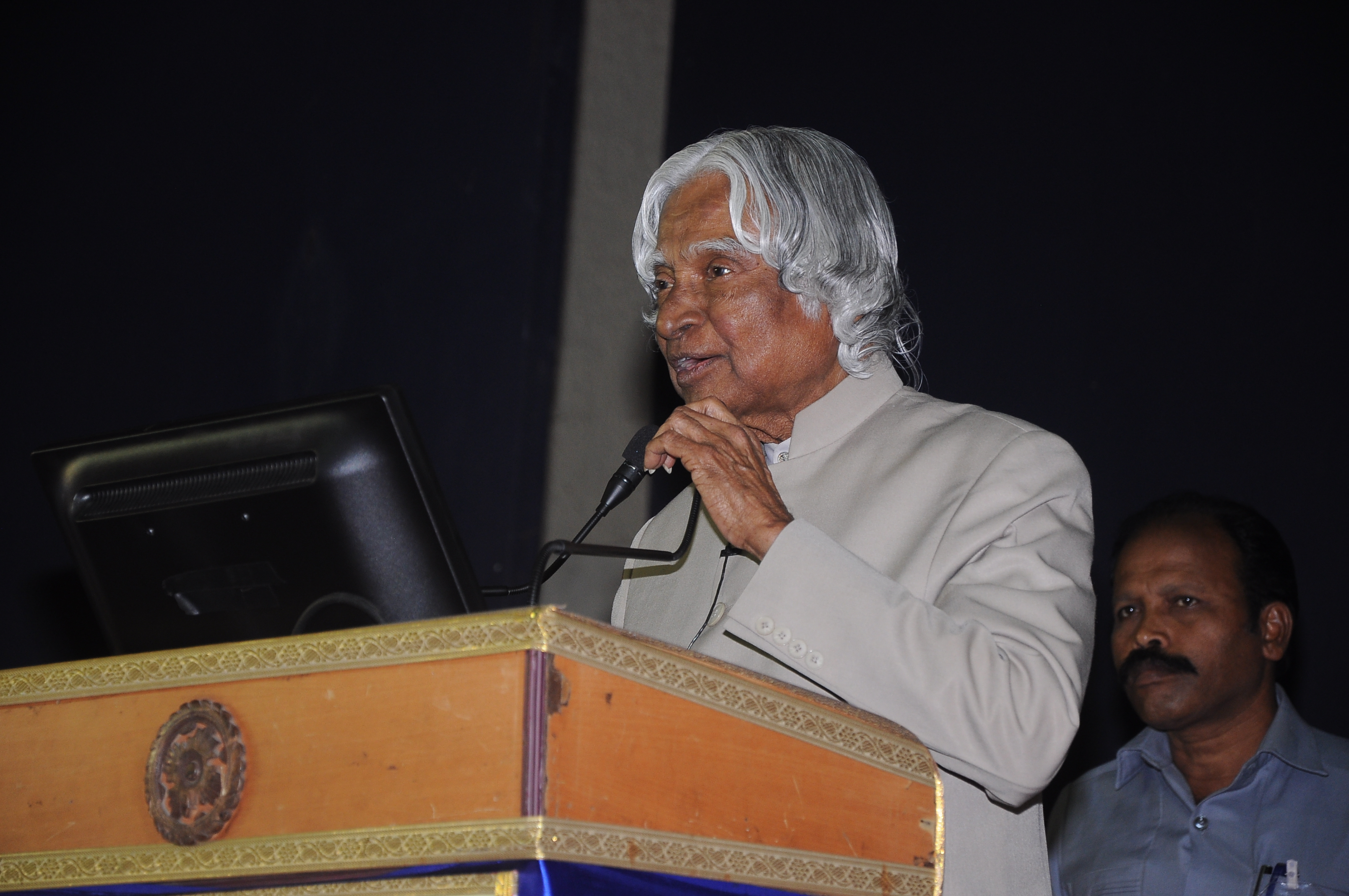
President Dr.A.P.J.Abdul Kalam addressing college students in 2014
