= St. Thomas Mount Assembly constituency =

Former state assembly constituency in Tamil Nadu, India

Coordinates: 13.01°N 80.19°E

St. Thomas Mount
- Former constituency No. 16 for the Tamil Nadu Legislative Assembly
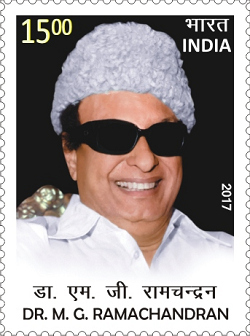
- Dr. M. G. Ramachandran - only M.L.A. from this constituency

Constituency details
- Country: India
- Region: South India
- State: Tamil Nadu
- District: Chingleput
- Established: 1967
- Abolished: 1976
- Total electors: 163,527
- Reservation: None

The St. Thomas Mount Assembly constituency was one of the 234 state legislative assembly constituencies in Tamil Nadu, a state in southern India. It was in existence for the 1967 and 1971 assembly elections. At that time, this constituency was represented only by the former chief minister of Tamil Nadu M. G. Ramachandran. Later, it was merged with the Alandur assembly constituency from the 1977 assembly election.

== Members of the Legislative Assembly ==
No.	Name (Birth–Death)	Term of office		Assembly (Election)	Political party
No.	Name (Birth–Death)	Assumed office	Left office	Assembly (Election)	Political party
1	M. G. Ramachandran (1917–1987)	15 March 1967	5 January 1971	4th (1967)	Dravida Munnetra Kazhagam
1	M. G. Ramachandran (1917–1987)	22 March 1971	14 October 1972	5th (1971)	Dravida Munnetra Kazhagam
1	M. G. Ramachandran (1917–1987)	17 October 1972	31 January 1976	5th (1971)	All India Anna Dravida Munnetra Kazhagam

== Election results ==
Vote share of winning candidates
1971	61.11%
1967	66.67%

=== Assembly election 1971 ===
1971 Tamil Nadu Legislative Assembly election: St. Thomas Mount
Party	Candidate	Votes	%	±%
DMK	M. G. Ramachandran	65,405	61.11	▼5.56
INC(O)	T. L. Raghupathy	40,773	38.10	New
Independent	M. Varadarajan	850	0.79	New
Majority		24,632	23.01	▼11.09
Turnout		107,028	67.31	▼9.26
DMK hold		Swing	▼5.56	

=== Assembly election 1967 ===
1967 Madras Legislative Assembly election: St. Thomas Mount
Party	Candidate	Votes	%	±%
DMK	M. G. Ramachandran	54,106	66.67	New
INC	T. L. Raghupathy	26,432	32.57	New
ABJS	K. Kasinathan	613	0.76	New
Majority		27,674	34.10	New
Turnout		81,151	76.57	New
DMK win (new seat)				
