= Transport in Tirunelveli =

Overview of transport in Tamil Nadu, India

Tirunelveli City being the district headquarters of Tirunelveli District in the Indian state of Tamil Nadu has a very extensive transport network. Tirunelveli district is a vital tourist destination with lot of religious places, monuments and hill stations. Tirunelveli is also a major junction for transportation around Tirunelveli, Thoothukudi and Kanyakumari Districts.

== Road ==
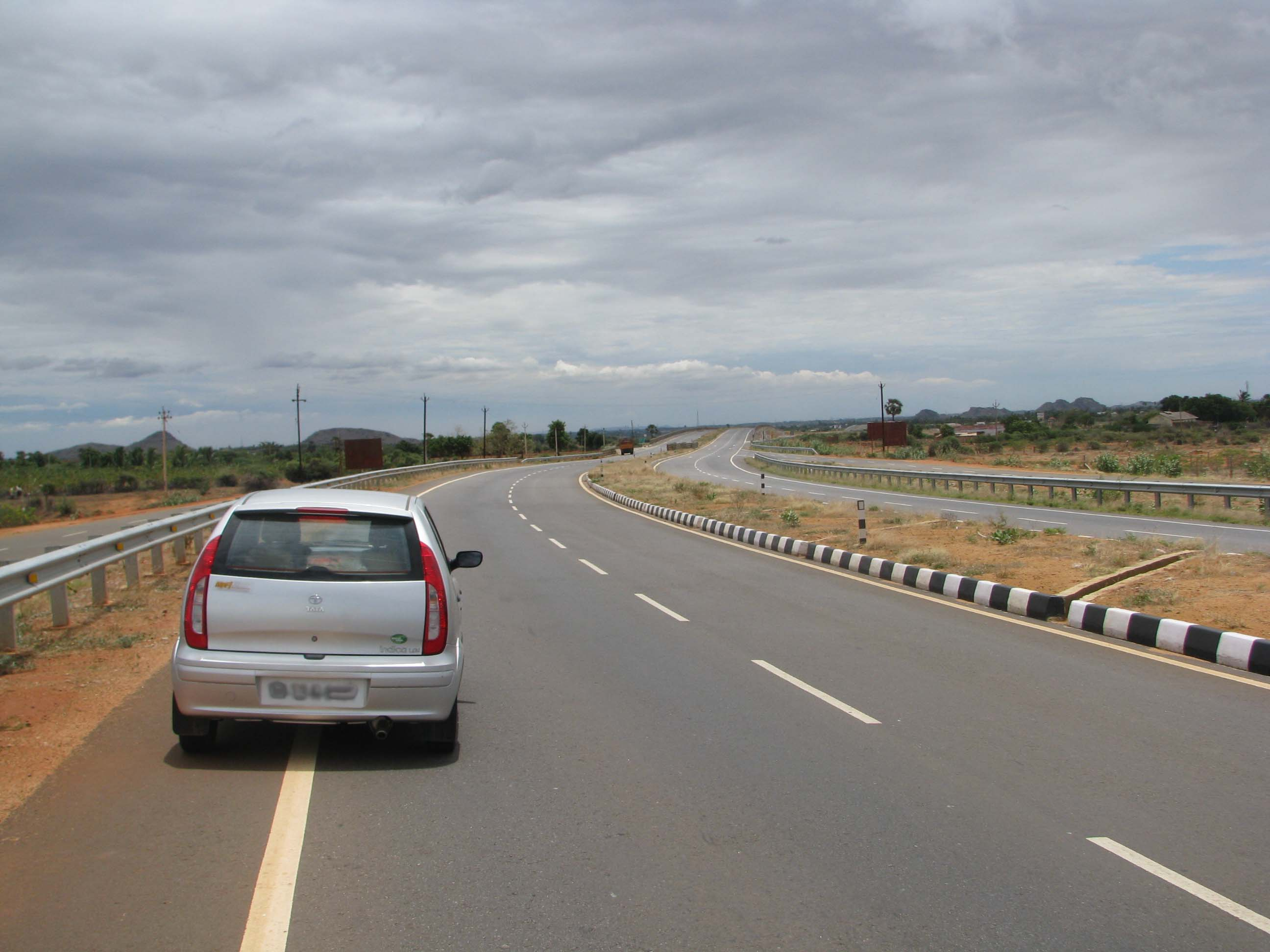
NH 44 at Nanguneri area in Tirunelveli district

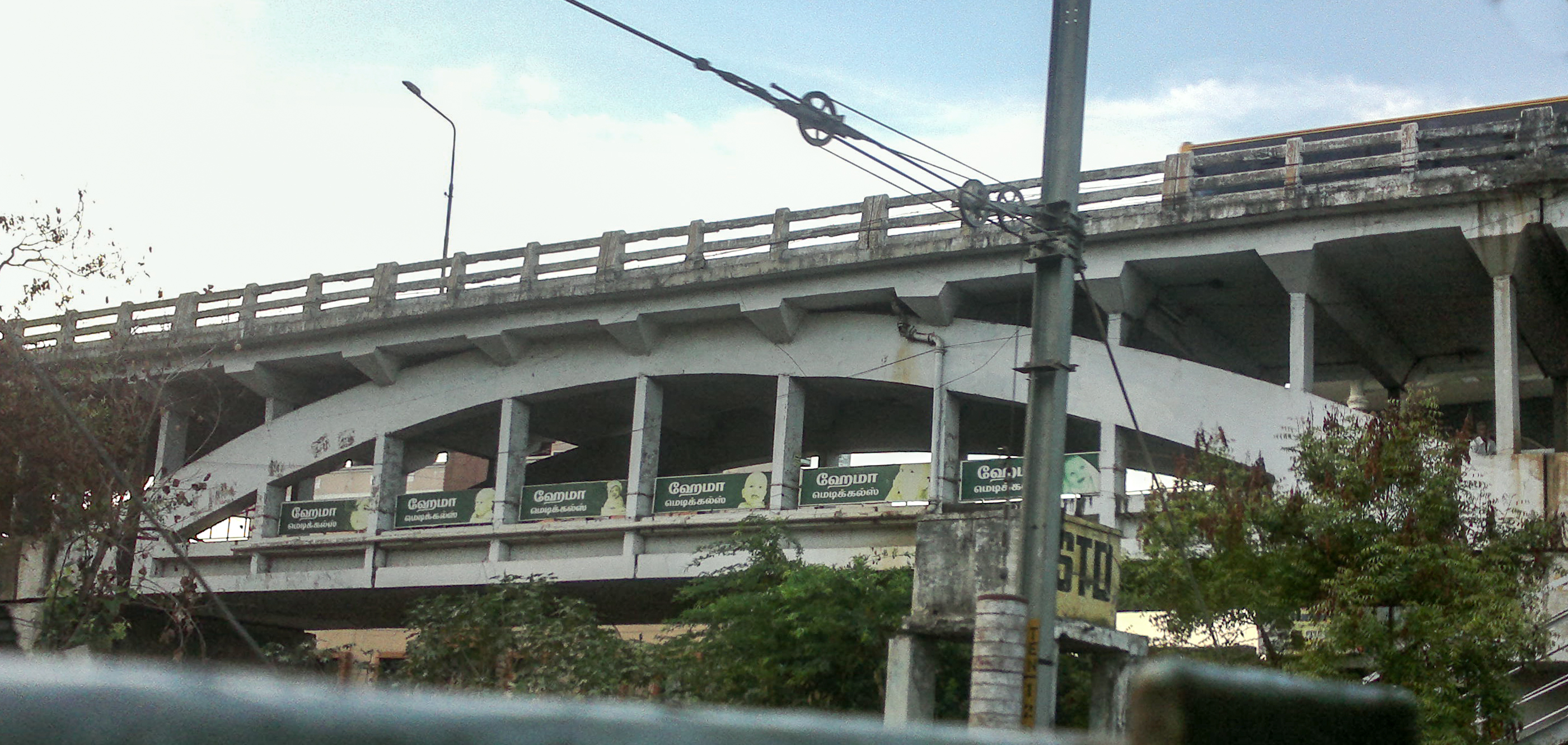
Two-tier Tiruvalluvar bridge, Tirunelveli

Tirunelveli city is well-connected by roads. It is located on NH 44, 150 kilometres (93 mi) south of Madurai and 80 kilometres (50 mi) north of Kanyakumari. NH 138, an extension of NH 44, connects Tirunelveli with Thoothukudi. The road infrastructure is being expanded with an extensive 4 carriageway expansion and the NH 138 stretch is almost in its final stage. Tirunelveli is accessible by road from Madurai (3 hours) and Nagercoil (1.5 hours).

Tirunelveli is also connected by major highways to Thiruvananthapuram, Kollam, Tiruchendur, Rajapalayam, Srivilliputtur, Sankarankovil, Ambasamudram, Kanyakumari, Thoothukudi, Madurai, Nazareth, Tenkasi, Sengottai, Virudhunagar, Kovilpatti, Aruppukottai, Nagercoil, Marthandam, etc. A 2-tier overbridge at Tirunelveli Junction known as Thiruvalluvar bridge is the first of its kind in India. This 800 m (2,600 ft) bridge was constructed to avoid the railway line crossing and was opened for traffic in 1972. This bridge consists of 25 spans of which 13 are of bow string arch, each with a width of 30.30 metres (99.4 ft) and 12 are single tier R.C.C girder each having a width of 11.72 metres (38.5 ft). Autorickshaws and call taxis are also important means of transport.

== Bus Stations ==
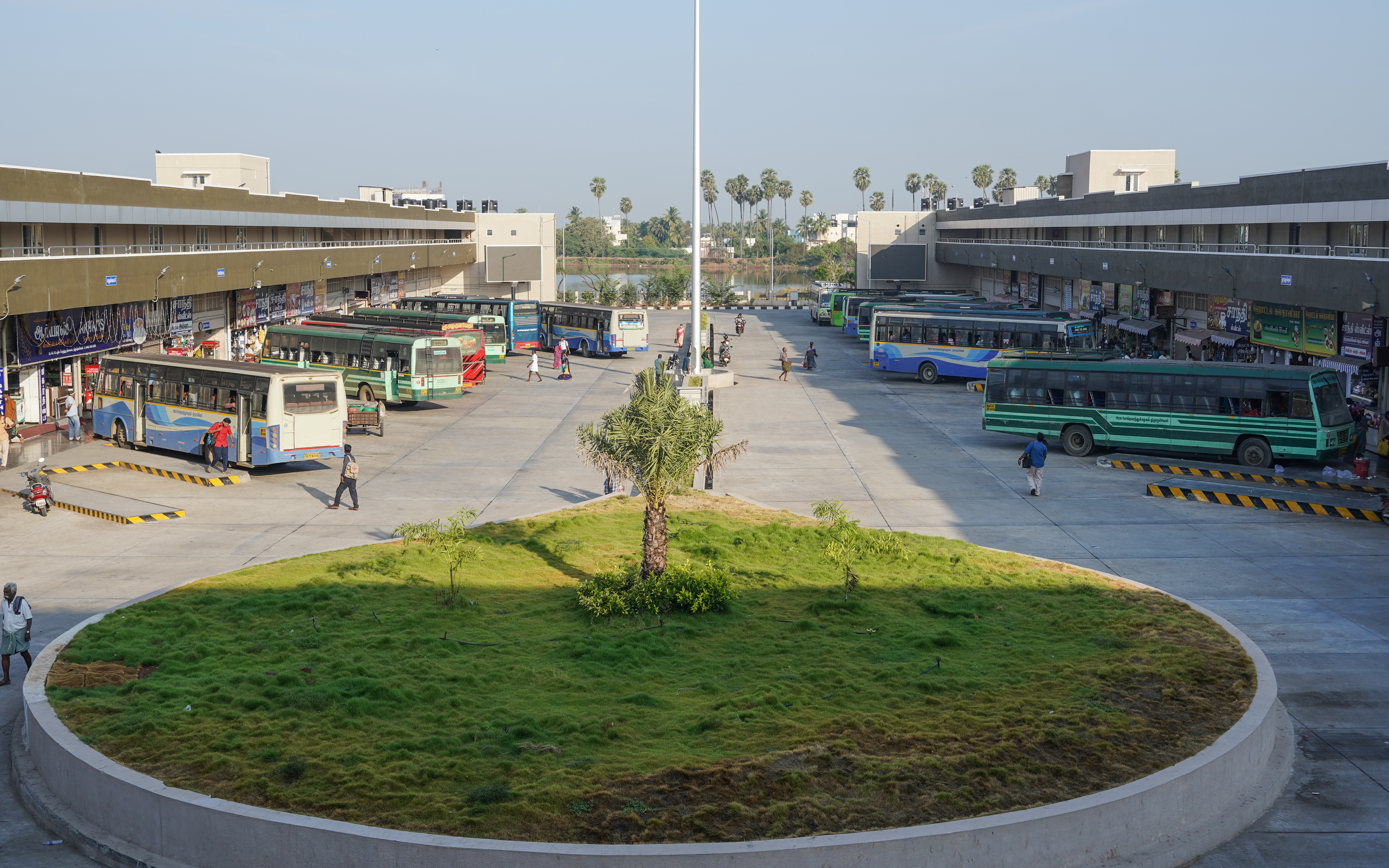
Main platforms, MGR Bus Stand. Apr '22

There are 4 bus stands in Tirunelveli city, the Bharat Ratna Dr. M.G.R. Bus Stand, the Periyar Junction Bus Stand, the Palayamkottai Bus Stand, and the Omni Bus Stand. The Main bus station was relocated from Tirunelveli Junction to Veinthankulam near Perumalpuram in 2003. The main bus stand has been developed under the Smart City Projects at a total cost of Rs. 50.72 crores (500.72 million). Renamed as the Bharat Ratna Dr. MGR Bus Stand, it was inaugurated by Chief Minister M.K. Stalin on 8 December 2021 through video conferencing. It is the 3rd largest bus terminal in Tamil Nadu after Koyambedu in Chennai and Madurai Mattuthavani. The Junction Periyar Old Bus Stand serves as the main Intra-city Bus Terminal. Some Omni buses due to traffic in and around the bus stand, operate on the North and South Bypass roads. Palayankottai Bus Stand is also an important Intra-city bus terminal.

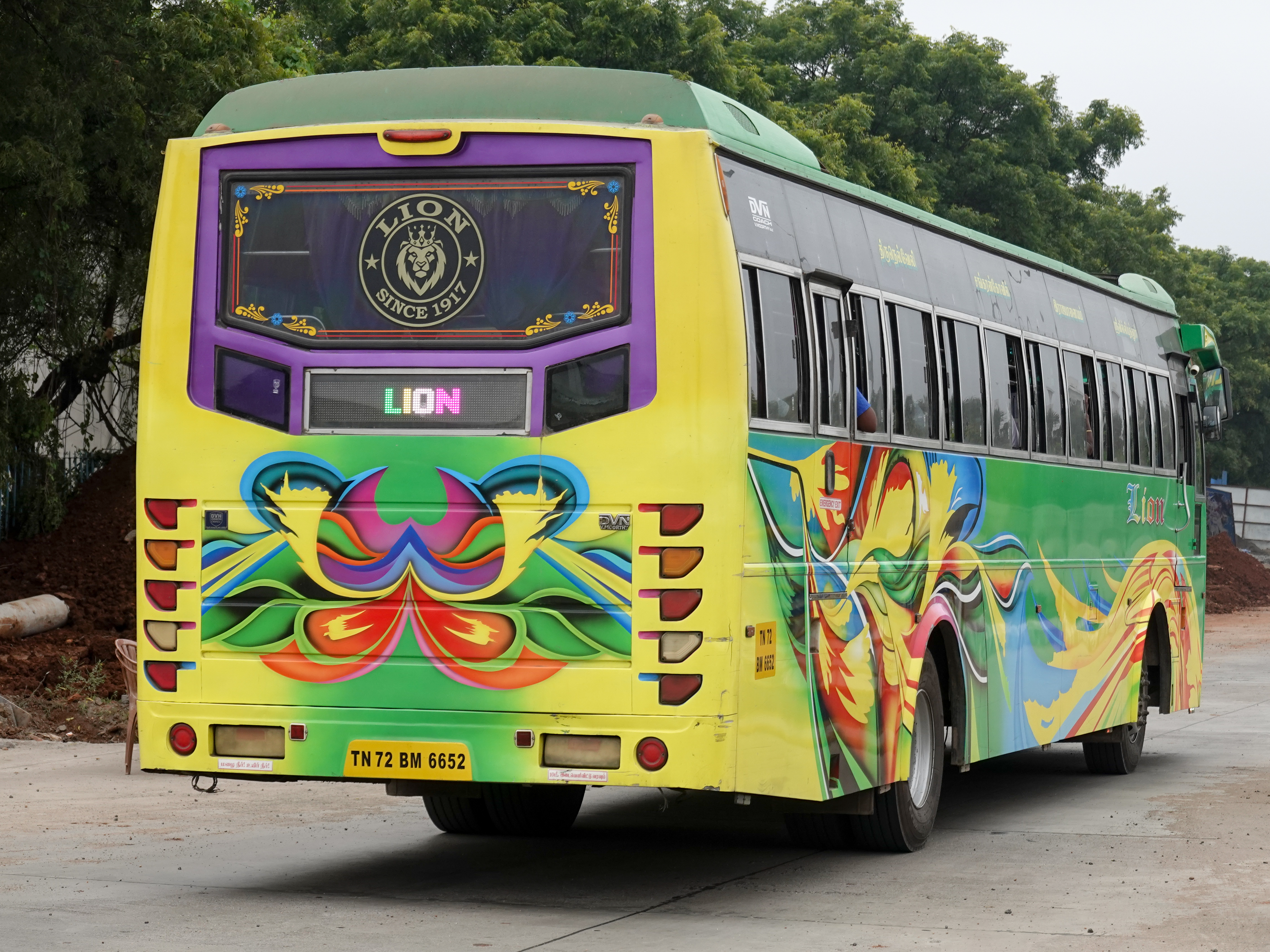
Private bus departing MGR Bus Stand. Jan '22

A large network of interstate and intrastate buses ply to various destinations. There is a good co-existence of both private and public transport networks in the city round the clock. The Tirunelveli Division of the TNSTC (Tamil Nadu State Transport Corporation) serves the district's road transport needs with a string of local and Mofussil services. Tamil Nadu's State Express Bus Corporation (SETC) operates express services to Chennai, Bengaluru, Salem, Coimbatore, Tirupur, Nagapattinam, Velankanni, Erode, Thanjavur, Kumbakonam, Mayiladuthurai, Chidambaram, Cuddalore, Puducherry, Viluppuram, Tirupati, Thiruvananthapuram, Kollam, Ernakulam, Udagamandalam (Ooty), Nagercoil, Kanyakumari, Marthandam, etc. The Kerala State Road transport Corporation (KSRTC) operates buses to Kollam, chenganacherry. There are omnibuses running to Chennai, Coimbatore, Bangalore. Omnibuses run as Inter-city Buses also.

== Railways ==
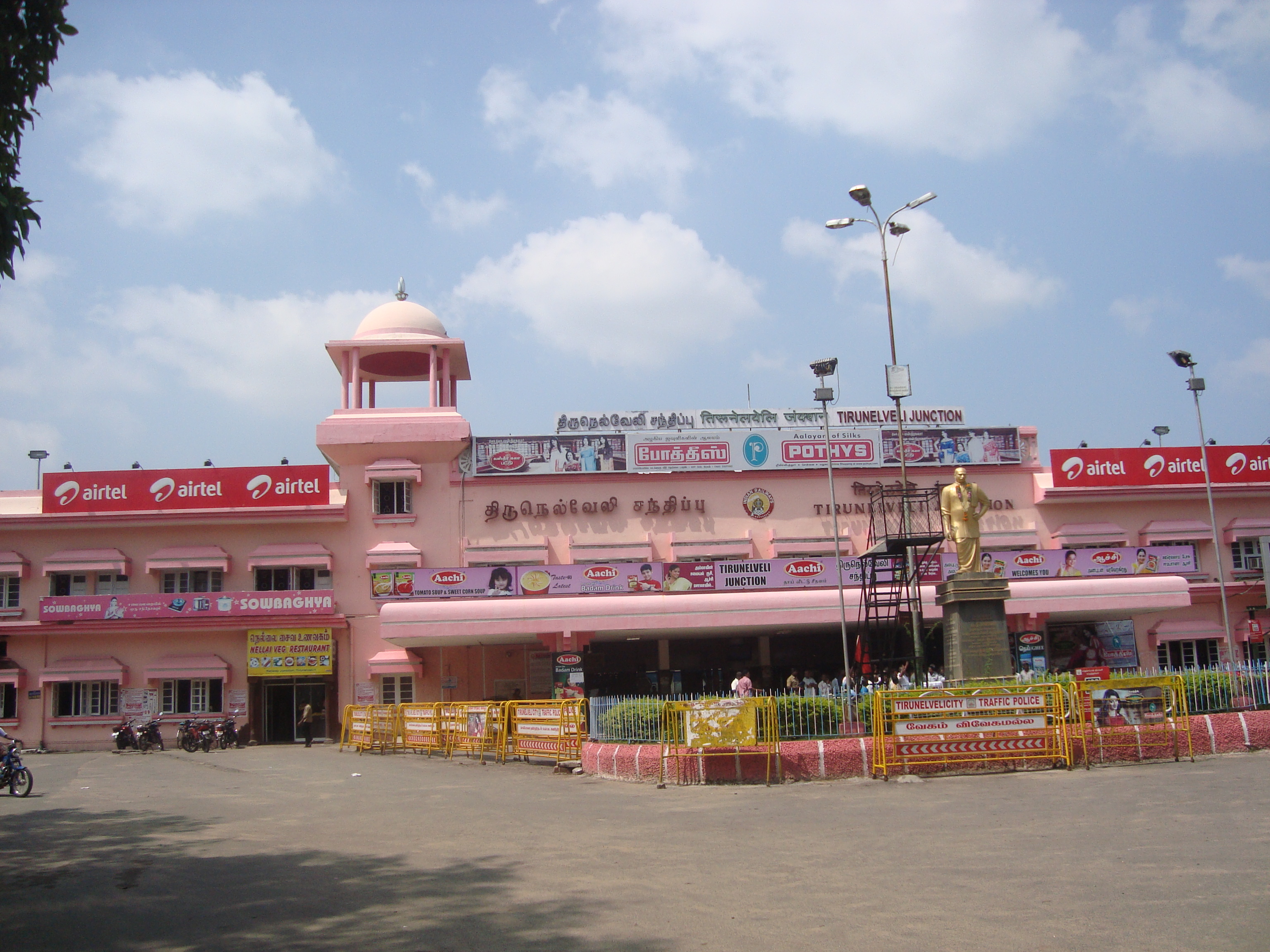
Tirunelveli Junction

The Tirunelveli Junction Railway Station is a majestic looking structure with a high elevated facade. It is one of the busiest and most important stations in Tamil Nadu. It is connected to major cities in all four directions, Madurai to the North, Nagercoil to the South, Tenkasi to the West and Tiruchendur to the East.

The Tirunelveli-Tiruchendur route is a broad-gauge network. At present, all engines and coaches with problems are sent to Nagercoil for maintenance. However, a large engine maintenance and service station is under construction. This station is facilitated with computerized ticket booking and touchscreens to know the train schedule and status. A computerized ticket booking center at Palayamkottai is operational. There are many express trains starting from Tirunelveli like Nellai Express, Hapa Express, Bilaspur Express, Jammutawi Express, etc.

The Tirunelveli railway station produces a substantial profit for the Madurai Railway division. The Nellai Express, — a super-fast train connecting Tirunelveli Junction and Chennai Egmore runs fully packed almost throughout the year. The station has six platforms . Tirunelveli Junction is coded as TEN. It is one of the oldest and most popular stations in Indian Railways.

Suburban stations:

Sl No.	Station Name	Station Code
1	Tirunelveli Junction	TEN
2	Tirunelveli Town	TYT
3	Palayamkottai	PCO
4	Pettai	PEA
5	Melapalayam	MP
6	Thalayoothu	TAY

== Airport ==
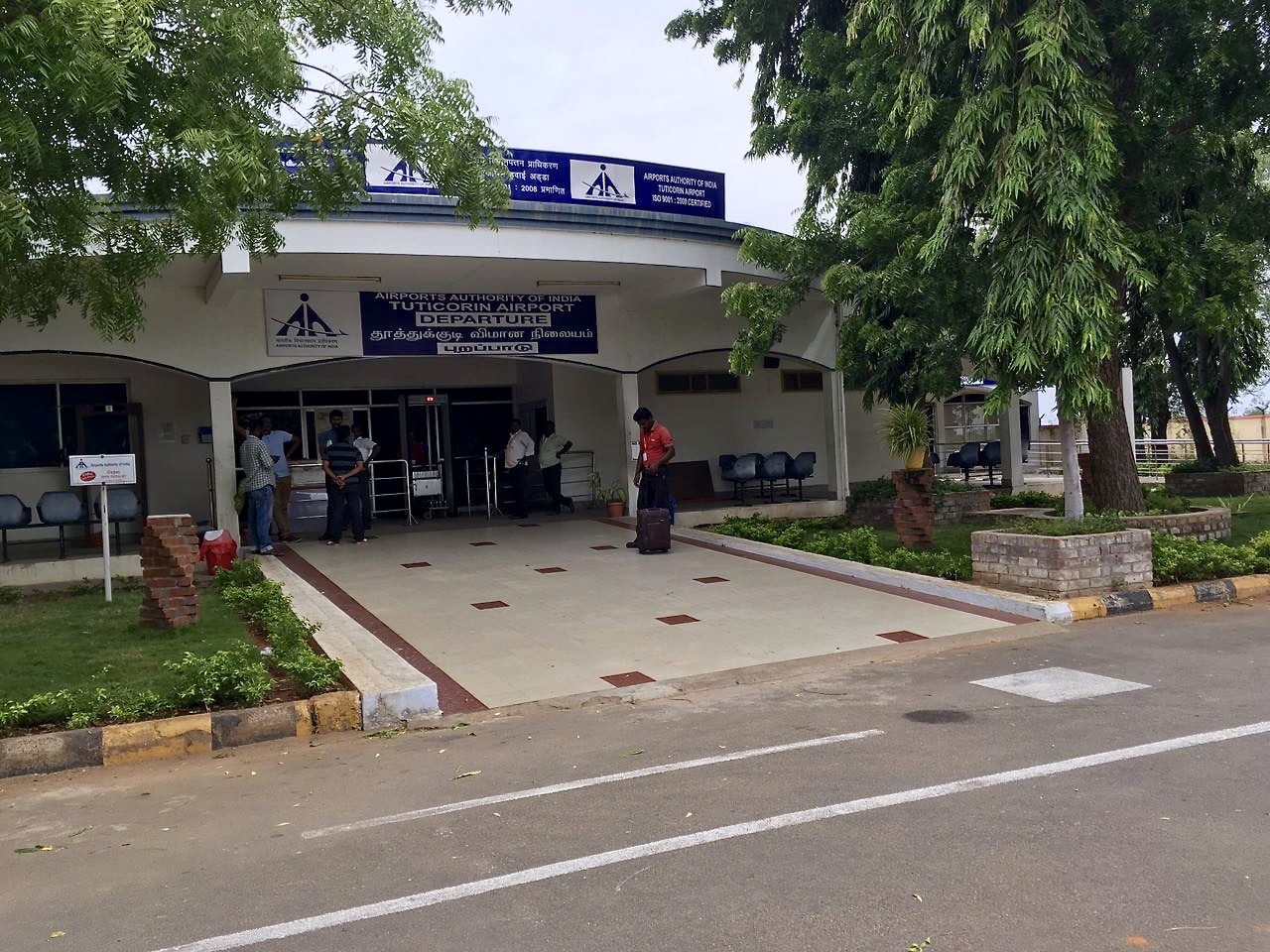
Thoothukudi Airport

Tirunelveli is served by the Tuticorin Airport (TCR), located at Vaagaikulam, Thoothukudi district, about 28 km (17 mi) east of Tirunelveli City. Several flights operate daily to Chennai and Bengaluru. The nearest international airport is Thiruvananthapuram International Airport and Madurai International Airport each about 150 km (93 mi) away by road .

== Seaport ==
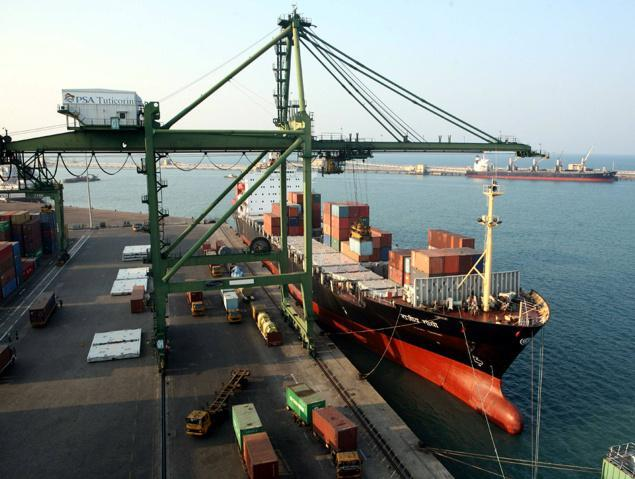
V.O. Chidambaranar Port Authority in Thoothukudi

The nearest seaport is V.O. Chidambaranar Port Authority in Thoothukkudi. it is about 54 km from Tirunelveli.
