= Kuruvai =

Delta crops grown in Tamil Nadu, India

Kuruvai is a short-duration rice crop. It is cultivated from June or July to September or October. The crops that are grown in this delta are mostly paddy and the health of these crops and the eventual livelihood of these farmers are extremely dependent on abundant flow of water on the Cauvery river.

The river has been the center of controversy between Tamil Nadu State and Karnataka State of India. The river which originates in Karnataka has been the life line of farmers of Karnataka and Tamil Nadu. Karnataka's capital city Bangalore gets its drinking water from Krishnaraja sagar Dam.
