= Reddiar =

Hindu agrarian caste

- ரெட்டியார் (Tamil) రెడ్డియార్ (Telugu)
- Religions: Hinduism
- Languages: Tamil (majority); Telugu (minority; native)
- Country: India
- Populated states: Tamil Nadu; Pondicherry
- Region: South India
- Ethnicity: Telugu
- Population: 400,000

Reddiar (also spelt as Reddiyar) is an ethnic-Telugu Warrior, landowning, merchantile, agricultural social group in Tamil Nadu and Pondicherry in India.

Reddiars, Reddy, Reddappa are of the same origins but spelled differently and they spread across the lands of Southern and Central India. They are the patrons/financial supporters of local temples in Tamil Region. The names have been believed to be derived according to the regions they are spread across. Reddy in Andhra Pradesh and Telangana, Reddiar (Reddy + ar) in Tamil Nadu, Pondicherry, and Kerala. Reddy, Reddappa (Reddy + appa- signifying respect) in Karnataka.

Many Reddiars moved from the Andhra region in search of rich soil for cultivation and settled in Pondicherry and the northern districts of Cuddalore, Villupuram and Chengalpet in Tamil Nadu during Vijayanagar Empire.

The migration of the Reddys/Reddiars to Tamil Nadu is assumed to have occurred during the Reddy dynasty expansion till Kanchipuram areas.

Following are the districts that have significant Reddiar Population. Chennai, Tiruvallur, Kanchipuram, Chengalpattu, Ranipet, Vellore, Thirupattur, Thiruvannamalai, Krishnagiri, Dharmapuri, Puducherry, Cuddalore, Villupuram, Kallakurichi, Salem, Erode, Tiruppur, Coimbatore, Karur, Perambalur, Tiruchirappalli, Dindigul, Madurai, Virudhunagar, Thoothukudi and Tirunelveli.

== Origins ==
Anavota Reddy (1335-1364 CE) of Reddy dynasty extended the dominion of the kingdom to Rajahmundry on the north, Kanchi on the south and Srisailam on the west. In a battle at Vallioor, Reddiapuram army defeated Travancore army in the 14th century. In an information Board at the entrance of the Vallioor Murugan Temple it is stated that 14th century Vallioor War - Reddiapuram army defeated Travancore Army at vallioor Battle. After this war Reddiars settled at Samugarengapuram, Seelathikulam, Parameswarapuram and all over Tirunelveli Region in the 14th century.

A mural at the Tiruppudaimaruthur temple in Tirunelveli district in Tamil Nadu, shows the emissaries of the Vijayanagara king Achyutadeva Raya serving an ultimatum to the Travancore ruler Bhoothala Veera Udaya Marthanda Varma to pay tributes to him and return the Pandya territory to Sri Vallabhan. It also depicts the battle between the armies of Achyutadeva Raya and Bhoothala Varma.They are believed moved into Tamil Nadu with the Vijayanagara Emperor Kumara Kampana to liberate Madurai [Madura Vijayam] from Islamic rule and expansion of Vijayanagar empire along with other Telugu and Kannada origin social groups.

== Diaspora ==
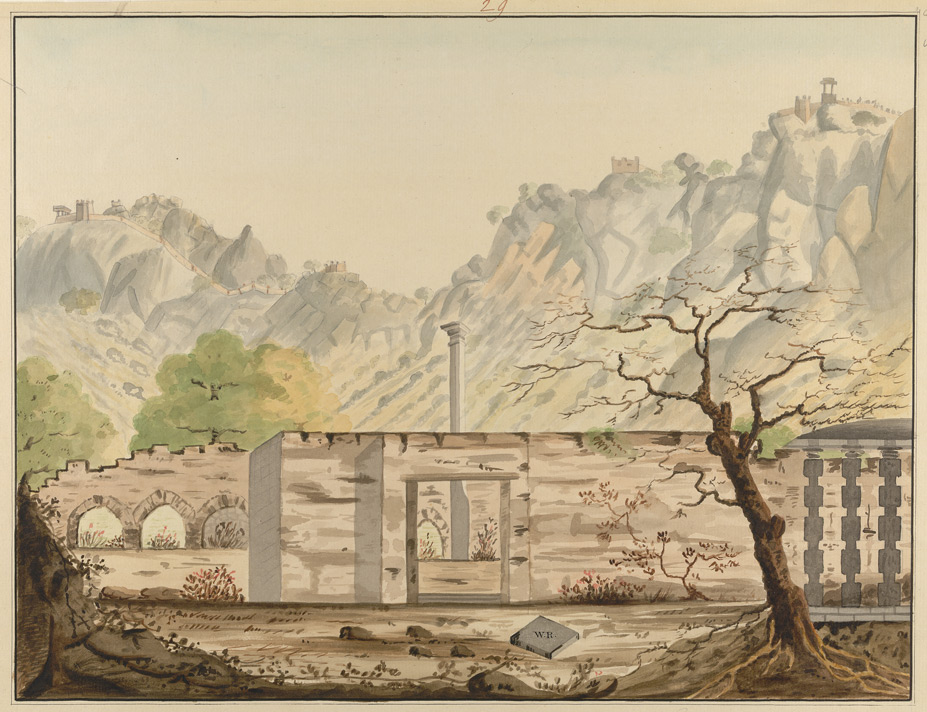
Water colour painting - Kondavidu fort, Reddy Kingdom.

Through emigration, there are now many Reddiars in the United States, South Africa, Singapore, Australia and United Kingdom. Many were brought to South Africa during British colonial era to work on the sugarcane farms as indentured labourers. The descendants of such Reddiars can still be found in South Africa today.

== Reddy versus Reddiars ==
Reddys predominantly speak Telugu and follow Telugu cultural norms like Ugadi, Dussehra and Sankranthi and follow all other Andhra norms, whereas Reddiars who came from Andhra to the Tamil region speak both Tamil and Telugu, and follow both Tamil and Telugu cultural norms. They also celebrate Thai Pongal, Tamil New Year and Ugadi. Some have represented in Tamil literary circles as great patrons and scholars of Tamil language.

== Prominent Reddiars ==
=== Former Chief Ministers ===
- A. Subbarayalu Reddiar - First Chief Minister of Madras Presidency from Dec 1920 - June 1921
- O. P. Ramaswamy Reddiyar - Former Premier of Madras Presidency from 1947-1949 and Former Member of Legislative Council of Madras Presidency from 1946 to 1958
- V. Venkatasubba Reddiar - Former Chief Minister of Puducherry from 1959 - 1963, 1964 - 1967 and 1968 and a prominent Puducherry freedom fighter
- V. Vaithilingam - Former Chief Minister of Puducherry - July 4, 1991 to May 13, 1996 (first term), September 4, 2008 – April 13, 2011, Member of Parliament from Puducherry, 2019 -
- M. D. R. Ramachandran - Former Chief Minister of Puducherry - 16 January 1980 to 23 June 1983 and 8 March 1990 – 3 March 1991

=== Ministers and Former Ministers of State ===
- K. K. S. S. R. Ramachandran - Minister for Revenue and Disaster Management in DMK Cabinet (2021-), Former Co-operation, PWD Minister in MGR Cabinet (1980 - 1988), Former Minister for Backward Classes (2006-2011),
- K. N. Nehru - Minister For Municipal Administration and Urban and Water Supply in DMK cabinet (2021-), Former Minister for Electricity (1989-1991), Former Minister for Food & Public Distribution System (1996–2001), Former Transport Minister in DMK Cabinet (2006–2011),
- Napoleon - Actor and Former MP of Perambalur Constituency Former Central Minister Of State for Social Justice and Empowerment, 2009 - 2013, Former Vice-President of Nadigar Sangam
- P. Balakrishna Reddy - Former Animal Husbandry Minister and Former Youth Welfare and Sports Development Minister of Tamil Nadu, 2016 - 2019
- N. Nallusamy - Former Housing and Slum Clearance Board Minister of Tamil Nadu in MGR Cabinet, 1985-1986
- C. Perumalswamy Reddiar - Former Industries, Mines and Materials Minister of Madras Presidency from 1949 - 1952 and Member of Indian Constituent Assembly from Madras Presidency

=== Freedom Fighters ===
- Muthukomarappa Reddiar - Freedom Fighter, who spearheaded the revolution to allow Puducherry to join with Indian Union.
- K. S. Venkatakrishna Reddiar - Freedom Fighter, Politician and, President of Congress Reform Committee and Former Member of Madras State Legislative Assembly
- Purushothama Reddiar R.L - Freedom Fighter who organized and presided over the French India People’s Convention in 1947 which fought for the conditional withdrawal of the French Regime in Puducherry and Former Member of Puducherry Legislative Assembly from Kuruvinatham Kariambuthur, 1956 - 1959 and 1959 - 1964.
- Venugopal Reddiar R. - Freedom Fighter who fought for the independence of Puducherry from French Regime.
- Chandrasekara Reddiar - Freedom Fighter who fought for the independence of Puducherry from French Regime.
- B.B.K. Raja Chidambara Reddiar - Freedom Fighter who took part in the Quit India Movement in 1941 and was imprisoned for one year in Trichy central jail. He was a member of the Trichy Jilla Board and he was a member of the Madras Legislative Assembly.
- J.Ramadoss Reddiar - Freedom Fighter from Villivakkam, Chennai.
- V.Ganapathi Reddiar - Freedom Fighter from Perambalur and Participated in Various Freedom Struggles and Donated Land to Poor for the Initiative of Bhoodan Movement.

=== Judiciary ===
- N. Krishnaswami Reddy - Former Justice of Madras High Court from 1964 to 1966.

=== Elected Representatives And Former Elected Representatives ===
==== Elected Representatives ====
- Arun Nehru (Tamil Nadu politician) - Member of Parliament of Lok Sabha from Perambalur Lok Sabha constituency, 2024 -
- R. Girirajan - Member of Parliament of Rajya Sabha from Tamil Nadu, 2022 -
- S. R. Raja - Member of Tamil Nadu Legislative Assembly from Tambaram Constituency, 2016 -
- M. Varalakshmi - Member of Tamil Nadu Legislative Assembly from Chengalpattu Constituency, 2016 -
- G. V. Markandayan - Member of Tamil Nadu Legislative Assembly from Vilathikulam Constituency, 2021 -, 2011 - 2016
- S. Kathiravan - Member of Tamil Nadu Legislative Assembly from Manachanallur Constituency, 2021 -
- M. Sivasankar - Member of Puducherry Legislative Assembly from Ozhukarai Constituency, 2021 -
- R. Senthilkumar - Member of Puducherry Legislative Assembly from Bahour Constituency, 2021 -

==== Former Elected Representatives ====
- R.Venkatasubbu Reddiar - Former Member of Parliament of Lok Sabha from Tindivanam Constituency, 1962 - 1967
- M. R. Lakshmi Narayanan - Former Member of Parliament of Lok Sabha from Tindivanam Constituency 1971 - 1977 and 1977 - 1979
- S. R. Vijayakumar - Former Member of Parliament of Lok Sabha from Chennai Central Constituency, 2014 - 2019
- R. Radhakrishnan (politician) - Former Member of Parliament of Lok Sabha from Puducherry Constituency, 2014 - 2019 and Former Member of Puducherry Legislative Assembly from Kuruvinatham Constituency, 2001 - 2011
- Jayarama Reddiar - Former Member of Madras State Legislative Assembly from Aruppukottai Constituency,1952 - 1957
- O.Venkatasubba Reddi - Former Member of Madras State Legislative Assembly from Maduranthakam Constituency, 1952 - 1957 and 1957 - 1962 and Former Member of Madras State Legislative Assembly from Acharapakkam constituency,1962 - 1967
- Gajapathi Reddiar - Former Member of Madras State Legislative Assembly from Ponneri Constituency, 1952 - 1957
- P. Rangaswami Reddiar - Former Member of Madras State Legislative Assembly from Thuraiyur Constituency, 1952 - 1957
- A. Ramachandra Reddiar - Former Member of Madras State Legislative Assembly of from Tiruvannamalai Constituency, 1952 - 1957
- M. Muni Reddy - Former Member of Madras State Legislative Assembly from Hosur constituency, 1952 - 1957 and Former Member of Madras State Legislative Assembly from Uddanapalle Constituency, 1957 - 1962
- M. G. Sankar - Former Member of Madras State Legislative Assembly from Nanguneri Constituency, 1952 - 1962, Philanthropist
- Thirukamu Reddi - Former Member of Puducherry Legislative Assembly from Sellipet Constituency, 1956 - 1959
- R.Krishnaswami Reddiar - Former Member of Madras State Legislative Assembly from Perambalur Constituency, 1957 - 1962
- A.V.P.Periavalaguruva Reddy - Former Member of Madras State Legislative Assembly from Tirumangalam Constituency from 1957 - 1962
- M. Ramachandra Reddy- Former Member Of Madras State Legislative Assembly from Vandavasi Constituency,1957 - 1962
- P.Doraisamy Reddiar - Former Member of Madras State Legislative Assembly from Arni Constituency, 1957 - 1962
- A.S.Doraiswamy Reddiar - Former Member of Madras State Legislative Assembly from Saidapet Constituency, 1957 - 1962
- M.Jangal Reddiar - Former Member of Tamil Nadu Legislative Assembly from Gingee Constituency, 1957 - 1962
- P.C. Purushottam Reddiar - Former Member of Puducherry Legislative Assembly from Thavalakuppam Constituency, 1959 - 1964
- N. Ramachandra Reddy - Former Member Of Madras State Legislative Assembly from Hosur Constituency,1962 - 1967 and Former Member of Tamil Nadu Legislative Assembly from Hosur Constituency, 1977 - 1980, 1989 - 1991
- A.Somasundara Reddiar - Former Member of Madras State Legislative Council,1962 - 1968
- Kesava Reddiar - Former Member of Tamil Nadu Legislative Assembly from Polur Constituency, 1962 - 1967
- O.Srinivasa Reddiar - Former Member of Madras State Legislative Assembly from Uthiramerur Constituency, 1962 - 1967
- A.Raghava Reddi - Former Member of Madras State Legislative Assembly from Gummidipoondi Constituency,1962 - 1967
- R.Rengasamy Reddiar- Former Member of Madras State Lesgislative Assembly from Dindigul Constituency,1962-1967
- K.Thiruvengadam - Former Member of Madras State Legislative Assembly from Tirumangalam Constituency, 1962 - 1967
- V. Bashyam Reddy - Former Member of Madras State Legislative Assembly from Purasawalkam Constituency, 1962 - 1967
- Manickavasaga Reddiar - Former Member of Puducherry Legislative Assembly from Mannadipet Constituency, 1964 - 1969
- P. S. Muthuselvan - Former Member of Tamil Nadu Legislative Assembly from Musiri Constituency, 1967 - 1976
- M. Kandaswamy - Former Member of Tamil Nadu Legislative Assembly from Kulithalai Constituency, 1967 - 1976
- E.M.Subramaniam - Former Member of Tamil Nadu Legislative Assembly from Tirukkoyilur Constituency, 1967 - 1971
- D. Ramachandran - Former Member of Puducherry Legislative Assembly from Mannadipet Constituency, 1974 - 1990 and 2001 - 2006
- P.E.Srinivasa Reddiar - Former Member of Tamil Nadu Legislative Assembly from Kulithalai Constituency, 1977 - 1980
- A.Ekambara Reddy - Former Member of Tamil Nadu Legislative Assembly from Pallipattu Constituency, 1977 - 1980, 1989 - 1991 and 1991 - 1996
- Pakkur S.Subramanian - Former Member of Tamil Nadu Legislative Assembly from Uthiramerur constituency, 1977 - 1980
- R. K. Perumal - Former Member of Tamil Nadu Legislative Assembly from Vilathikulam Constituency,1977 - 1984
- T.R.Rajaram Reddy - Former Member of Tamil Nadu Legislative Assembly from Tindivanam Constituency, 1977 - 1980
- K.Narayanasamy - Former Member of Tamil Nadu Legislative Assembly from Tiruvannamalai Constituency, 1980 - 1984
- S. Kumara Kurubara Ramanathan - Former Member of Tamil Nadu Legislative Assembly from Vilathikulam Constituency, 1984- 1987
- T. Venkata Reddy - Former Member of Tamil Nadu Legislative Assembly from Hosur Constituency, 1980 - 1989.
- R. Ramanathan - Former Member of Puducherry Legislative Assembly, Kurivinatham Constituency, 1985 - 1991
- G.G.Gurumoorthy - Former Member of Tamil Nadu Legislative Assembly from Bhavani Constituency, 1989 - 1991.
- M.Venkatarama Reddy - Former Member of Tamil Nadu Legislative Assembly from Thalli Constituency, 1991 - 1996
- A. Pappasundaram - Former Member of Tamil Nadu Legislative Assembly from Kulithalai Constituency,1989 - 1996, 2001 - 2006, 2011 - 2016
- S. Raja Reddy - Former Member of Tamil Nadu Legislative Assembly from Thalli Constituency, 1996 - 2001
- K. Ravisankar - Former Member of Tamil Nadu Legislative Assembly from Vilathikulam Constituency, 2001 - 2006
- N. K. Perumal - Former Member of Tamil Nadu Legislative Assembly from Vilathikulam Constituency, 2001 - 2006
- P. Chinnappan - Former Member of Tamil Nadu Legislative Assembly from Vilathikulam Constituency, 2006-2011 and 2019 - 2021
- Sorathur R. Rajendran (AIADMK politician) - Former Member of Tamil Nadu Legislative Assembly from Kurinjipadi Constituency, 2011 - 2016
- V. Muthukumar - Former Member of Tamil Nadu Legislative Assembly from Virudhachalam Constituency, 2011 - 2016
- P. R. Manogar - Former member of the Tamil Nadu Legislative Assembly from the Sholingur constituency, 2011 - 2016.
- E. Ramar - Former Member of Tamil Nadu Legislative Assembly from Kulithalai Constituency, 2016 - 2021
- K. Uma Maheswari - Former Member of Tamil Nadu Legislative Assembly from Vilathikulam Constituency, 2016 - 2019
- R. B. Ashok Babu - Former Nominated Member of Puducherry Legislative Assembly, 2021 - 2025

=== Politicians ===
- Trichy Velusamy - Indian National Congress Spokesperson
- Prof. Dr. R. Srinivasan - Tamil Nadu Bharatiya Janata Party General Secretary and Spokesperson and Independent Director of NABARD

=== Tamil Writers and Poets ===
- Annamalai Reddiyar - Tamil Poet
- A.Ve.Ra Krishnaswami Reddiar - Renowned Journalist and Tamil Writer
- Ve.Vengadarajulu Reddiar - Notable Tamil Researcher and Tamil Writer
- Prof. Dr. N Subbu Reddiar - Eminent Tamil Writer and Researcher
- Illakiyaveedhi Iniyavan - Prominent Tamil Writer
- Va.Ko.Shanmugam - Renowned Tamil Poet and Writer
- Nesamigu S.Rajakumaaran - Prominent Tamil Poet and Writer and Directed Various Documentary Films

=== Doctors and Health Practitioners ===
- Muthulakshmi Reddi - First Indian Woman Doctor and Former Legislator, Founder of Cancer Institute (WIA), Padma Bhushan Awardee
- Dr.T.Sundara Reddi - First Indian doctor to become a Fellow of the Royal Society of Civil Surgeons (FRCS) and he had set up the Clinic for Poor and Downtrodden People, Husband of Muthulakshmi Reddi and Nephew of A. Subbarayalu Reddiar
- Krishnamurthy Reddiar - Notable Herbal Practitioner from Sri Lanka
- Dr. Venugopal S Reddiar - Physician, Success Coach & Behavioural Scientist
- Dr S Venkatesh Babu, FRCS, FACS - Orthopaedic & Trauma Surgeon from Tirunelveli. Founder of Sri Sakthi Hospital, Tirunelveli City.

=== Agriculture ===
- T. Venkatapathi Reddiar - Famous Horticulturist and Florist and a Recipient of Padma Shri Award
- G. Sundarama Reddiar - Prominent leader in the South India Farmers’ Union

=== Education ===
- Dhanalakshmi A. Srinivasan - Founder - Chancellor of Dhanalakshmi Group of Institutions
- K.Ramaswamy - Founder of National Engineering College, Kovilpatti
- K.R.Arunachalam - Managing Trustee of K.R Group of Institutions
- R.Shanmugaiah - Founder of RSR International School, Sivakasi
- Ramesh Prabha - Educationist, Chairman of Galaxy Institute of Management Chennai, Career Guidance Specialist and a Television Presenter.
- N.Narayanasamy Reddiyar - Renowned Teacher and Tamil Writer and Founder of Narayana Gardens
- T.Kalathur Pulavar Rengaraju Reddiyar - Won the Best Teacher Award from then President of India K. R. Narayanan in 1997 & Best Teacher Award (state level) from the Ex-Chief Minister of Tamilnadu J. Jayalalithaa in 1993. Also a Tamil poet.
- M.Sathya Kumar - Educationist and Renowned Economic & Tax Law Advisor in India. He Completed Chartered Accountancy, Cost Accountancy and Company Secretary courses, becoming one of the few triple-qualified finance professionals in India and now practicing as an Advocate.

=== Arts and Cinema ===
- C. V. Sridhar - Famous Film Director
- K.M. Adimoolam - Prominent Artist and a recipient of Lalit Kala Akademi National Award
- Sirpy - Renowned Tamil, Telugu Music Composer
- Vasanth Ravi - Tamil Film Actor
- Alagesh alias Venkatesh - Tamil Film and Serial Actor

=== Sports ===
- G. R. Vaishnav - Indian Volleyball Player
- Muthamizh Selvi - First Woman from Tamil Nadu to Climb Mount Everest

=== Entrepreneurs ===
- A.Muthukrishnan - Co-Founder of Namma Veedu Vasanta Bhavan Chain of Restaurants, Tamil Nadu
- A.Rengasamy - Co-Founder of Namma Veedu Vasanta Bhavan Chain of Restaurants, Tamil Nadu
- M.Ravi - Owner of Namma Veedu Vasanta Bhavan Chain of Restaurants, Tamil Nadu
- R. Kandasamy Reddiar - Founder of Valarmathi Hotels(Now Known as Temple City Group of Hotels), Madurai, Tamil Nadu
- Temple City Lakshamana Kumar - Owner of Temple City Group of Hotels, Madurai, Tamil Nadu
- G. Renganathan - Owner of Guru Hotel, Tiruchirappalli, Tamil Nadu
- E.V.Perumalsamy Reddy - Founder of EVP Group of Companies
- E.V.P.Santhosh Reddy - Managing Director of EVP Group of Companies
- S.T. Reddiar - Founder of ST Reddiar Press, Ernakulam, Kerala
- Veeraiah Reddiar - Founder of Seematti, One of Kerala's Big Textile and Silk Showrooms.
- Beena Kannan - Owner of Seematti, Kerala
- Aiyappa Reddiar - Founder of Aiyappas, Kottayam, Kerala
- K. Lakshmana Reddiar - Textile Tycoon, Founder of Parthas, Textile and Silk Showroom Chain, Kerala
- M. Venkatanarayana Reddiar - Textile Tycoon, Founder of Sreenivas Fabrics, Kerala
- T.K.Perumal Reddiar - Prominent Pulses and Grains Merchant, Kollam, Kerala
- Nataraja Reddiar - Founder of Famous Grand Sweets & Snacks, Chennai
- K. Santhanam Reddiar - Founder of Sanco Trans Group, Chennai
- M. Vengadasubbu - Founder of Darling Electronics
- Ramanuja Reddiar Kumar - Founder of Anuj Tiles
- K.R.V. Ganesan - Founder of Aswins Sweets, Perambalur
- R.Manoharan - Founder of Banana Leaf Group of Restaurants
- Preetha Jagadeesh Reddiar - Co-Founder of Godavari Restaurant and Nalas Kitchen, Minneapolis, Veedu Indian Kitchen, Michigan USA

=== Intrapreneur ===
- Rajmohan Rajagopalan - General Manager at Microsoft, Palo Alto, California
- Nindhana Paranthaman - Executive Medical Director at Summit Therapeutics, Menlo Park, California

== See also ==
- Tamil diaspora
- Telugu diaspora
- List of Reddy dynasties and states
