= D. Murugesan (politician) =

Indian politician

Member of the Tamil Nadu Legislative Assembly
- In office 2011–2016
- Preceded by: K. Arumugam
- Succeeded by: M. Varalakshmi
- Constituency: Chengalpattu

Personal details
- Party: Desiya Murpokku Dravida Kazhagam

D. Murugesan is an Indian politician from Anakaputhur. He was a member of the 14th Tamil Nadu Legislative Assembly from the Chengalpattu constituency, representing the Desiya Murpokku Dravida Kazhagam party.

The elections of 2016 resulted in his constituency being won by M. Varalakshmi.

In the 2026 Tamil Nadu Legislative Assembly election, Murugesan contested from the Pallavaram Assembly constituency representing the Desiya Murpokku Dravida Kazhagam (DMDK). He lost the election to J. Kamatchi of the Tamilaga Vettri Kazhagam (TVK) by a margin of 54,693 votes. Murugesan secured 78,918 votes (27.82%), while the winning candidate, Kamatchi, received 1,33,611 votes (47.10%) out of the total 283,677 votes polled in the constituency.

== Electoral performance ==
Election	Constituency	Political party	Result	Vote %	Opposition			Ref
Election	Constituency	Political party	Result	Vote %	Candidate	Political party	Vote %	Ref
2011	Chengalpattu	DMDK	Won	44.58%	V. G. Rangasamy	PMK	44.42%	
2016	Chengalpattu	DMDK	Lost	6.98%	M. Varalakshmi	DMK	45.11%	
