= C. G. Viswanathan =

Member of Tamil Nadu Legislative Assembly
- In office 1962–1967
- Preceded by: Muthusamy Naicker & Appavu
- Constituency: Chengalpattu
- In office 1967–1971
- In office 1971–1976
- Succeeded by: P. G. Anoor Jegadeesan

Personal details
- Born: 9 March 1933 Chengalpattu
- Party: DMK

C. G. Viswanathan (born 9 March 1933) was an Indian politician and a former Member of the Tamil Nadu Legislative Assembly. He hailed from Alagesan Nagar in Chengalpattu. Viswanathan received his education at St. Columba's Higher Secondary School in Chengalpattu. He was a member of the Dravida Munnetra Kazhagam (DMK). He served as the president of the Thirukazhukundram Town Panchayat from 1970 and had earlier served as a member of the Chengalpattu Municipality from 1957 to 1961. Viswanathan was elected to the Tamil Nadu Legislative Assembly from the Chengalpattu constituency as a DMK candidate in the 1962, 1967, and 1971 Tamil Nadu Legislative Assembly elections.

== Electoral performance ==
Election	Constituency	Political party	Result	Vote %	Opposition			Ref
Election	Constituency	Political party	Result	Vote %	Candidate	Political party	Vote %	Ref
1962	Chengalpattu	DMK	Won	50.32%	G. Rajarathana Nayagar	INC	46.50%	
1967	Chengalpattu	DMK	Won	62.77%	T. Naicker	INC	28.73%	
1971	Chengalpattu	DMK	Won	62.09%	S. T. Neelakantan	INC	27.07%	
