= G. V. Markandayan =

Indian politician

Member of Tamil Nadu Legislative Assembly
- Incumbent
- Assumed office 12 May 2021
- Preceded by: P. Chinnappan
- Constituency: Vilathikulam
- In office 23 May 2011 – 21 May 2016
- Preceded by: P. Chinnappan
- Succeeded by: K. Uma Maheshwari
- Constituency: Vilathikulam

Personal details
- Born: 1976 (age 49–50) Tamil Nadu, India
- Party: Dravida Munnetra Kazhagam (2020-Present)
- Other political affiliations: All India Anna Dravida Munnetra Kazhagam (until 2020)
- Spouse: Anita
- Children: 2
- Education: BL

G. Varatharajan Markandayan (born 1976) is an Indian politician from Tamil Nadu. He is a member of the Tamil Nadu Legislative Assembly from the Vilathikulam constituency. He was last elected in the 2026 Tamil Nadu Legislative Assembly election representing the Dravida Munnetra Kazhagam party.

== Early life and education ==
Markandayan is from Vilathikulam, Thoothukudi district, Tamil Nadu. He is the son of Varatharajan. He completed his B.L at Government Law College, Madurai in 2000. His wife is also an advocate.

== Career ==
Markandayan was first elected as an MLA from Vilathikulam Assembly constituency in the 2011 Tamil Nadu Legislative Assembly election representing the All India Anna Dravida Munnetra Kazhagam. He polled 72,753 votes and defeated his nearest rival, Perumalsamy. K of the Indian National Congress, by a margin of 22,597 votes. He was denied a ticket in the 2019 Tamil Nadu Legislative Assembly by-elections by the AIADMK party and he lost as independent rebel candidate from the Vilathikulam constituency, finishing third with about 28000 votes. Later, AIADMK leadership expelled him from the party. Later, he joined the DMK and was elected from the same constituency in the 2021 Assembly election where he defeated P. Chinnappan of the AIADMK by a margin of 38,549 votes.

In February 2016, during a debate on the interim budget he made some remarks about DMK and M K Stalin's son-in- law Sabareesan, which infuriated the DMK members that led to an argument with the speaker, P Dhanapal, who later ordered that some members who squatted to be forcefully removed.

== Electoral performance ==
=== Tamil Nadu Legislative Assembly Election ===
Elections	Constituency	Party	Result	Vote percentage	Opposition Candidate	Opposition Party	Opposition vote percentage
2011	Vilathikulam	AIADMK	Won	54.58	K. Perumalsamy	INC	37.63
2019 By-Election	Vilathikulam	Independent	Lost	17.35	P. Chinnappan	AIADMK	44.32
2021	Vilathikulam	DMK	Won	54.38	P. Chinnappan	AIADMK	31.18
2026	Vilathikulam	DMK	Won	33.40	P. Kasiram	TVK	28.70
