= J. Kamatchi =

Indian politician (born 1981)

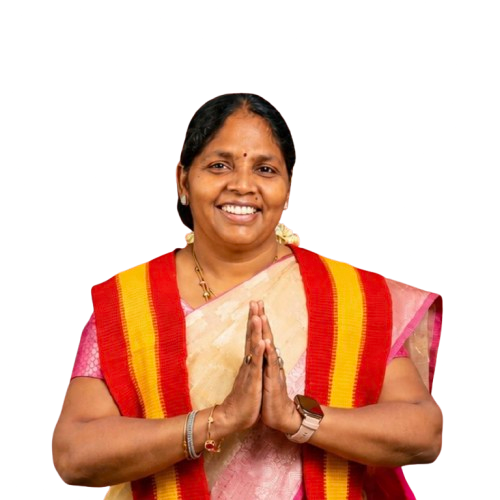

Member of the Tamil Nadu Legislative Assembly
- Incumbent
- Assumed office 10 May 2026
- Chief Minister: C. Joseph Vijay
- Preceded by: I. Karunanithi (DMK)
- Constituency: Pallavaram

Personal details
- Born: 26 May 1981 (age 45)
- Party: Tamilaga Vettri Kazhagam
- Spouse: J. Jayakrishnan
- Children: Dhanush J Vishal J
- Education: Higher Secondary Education, Avvai Home TVR Girls Higher Secondary School (1998)
- Occupation: Business owner (real estate, supermarket, restaurant, cinema production) and licensed stamp vendor

Jayakrishnan Kamatchi (born 26 May 1981) is an Indian politician from Tamil Nadu. She is a Member of the Legislative Assembly from the Pallavaram Assembly constituency in the Chengalpattu district, representing the Tamilaga Vettri Kazhagam.

Following her election in May 2026, her five-year legislative term is scheduled to run until its natural expiration on 18 June 2031, unless the assembly is dissolved earlier. (Note: Under Article 172(1) of the Constitution of India, a State Legislative Assembly, unless sooner dissolved, continues for five years from the date appointed for its first meeting and no longer, operating as an automatic dissolution.)

== Early life and education ==
Kamatchi is from Sholinganallur, Tamil Nadu. She married Jayakrishnan. She went to Avvai Home TVR Girls Higher Secondary School and passed Class 12 in 1998. She runs her own business. She declared assets worth Rs.106 crore in her affidavit to the Election Commission of India.

== Career ==
Kamatchi began her political life with TVK and became an MLA for the first time winning the 2026 Tamil Nadu Legislative Assembly election from Pallavaram Assembly constituency representing the Tamilaga Vettri Kazhagam. She is the first female MLA of the Pallavaram constituency. She polled 1,33,611 votes and defeated her nearest rival, D. Murugesan of the Desiya Murpokku Dravida Kazhagam, by a margin of 54,693 votes.

== Electoral history ==
| Year | Constituency | Party | Votes | % | Opponent | Opponent Party | Opponent Votes | % | Result | Margin | % |
|---|---|---|---|---|---|---|---|---|---|---|---|
| 2026 | Pallavaram | TVK | 1,33,611 | 47.10 | D.Murugesan | DMDK | 78,918 | 27.82 | Won | 54,693 | 19.28 |
