= Suriyanur A. Chandran =

Member of the Tamil Nadu Legislative Assembly
- Incumbent
- Assumed office 2026
- Preceded by: R. Manickam
- Constituency: Kulithalai

Personal details
- Born: Melappatti, Karur district, Tamil Nadu, India
- Party: Dravida Munnetra Kazhagam
- Spouse: Thilagavathi
- Children: Mirunalini, Surutheerena (daughters)
- Education: Annamalai University
- Profession: Agriculture

Suriyanur A. Chandran is an Indian politician and member of Dravida Munnetra Kazhagam (DMK). He is the elected Member of the Legislative Assembly (MLA) for the Kulithalai Assembly constituency in Karur district, Tamil Nadu, having won the seat in the 2026 Tamil Nadu Legislative Assembly election.

== Electoral Performance ==
2026 Tamil Nadu Legislative Assembly election: Kulithalai
Party	Candidate	Votes	%	±%
DMK	Suriyanur A. Chandran	68,138	32.59	▼18.78
TVK	G. Balasubramani	67,559	32.31	New
AIADMK	S.Karunakaran	60,317	28.85	▼10.53
NTK	Selva.Nanmaaran	7,978	3.82	▼2.05
NOTA	NOTA	612	0.29	▼0.32
Independent	S.Senthilkumar	607	0.29	New
Independent	V.Chinnasamy	488	0.23	New
Independent	P.Selvakumar	452	0.22	New
Independent	D.Saravanan	381	0.18	New
Ganasangam Party of India	P.Murugan	330	0.16	New
Independent	K.Sheikanwardeen	302	0.14	New
Independent	T.Selvaraj	217	0.10	New
Independent	J.Santhosh Kumar	206	0.10	New
Independent	K.Hakkim	182	0.09	New
Independent	B.Sampathkumar	162	0.08	New
Independent	Chandrasekar.P	133	0.06	New
Independent	M.Vadivelan	117	0.06	New
Independent	M.Arunkumar	113	0.05	New
Independent	O.Kathalingam	95	0.05	New
Independent	M.Gayathiri	84	0.04	New
Independent	B.Kajahmohideen	83	0.04	New
Independent	T.Muruganantham	82	0.04	New
Independent	K.Veeramalai	79	0.04	New
Independent	S.Imrankhan	68	0.03	New
Independent	M.Tamilselvan	67	0.03	New
Independent	N.Ramakrishnan	63	0.03	New
Independent	R.Arunkumar	53	0.03	New
Independent	M.Mayilvaganan	46	0.02	New
Independent	J.Madhavan	41	0.02	New
Independent	J.Pradhap	36	0.02	New
Margin of victory		579	0.28	▼11.71
Turnout		2,09,091	93.60	▲7.17
Registered electors		2,23,376		▼3,692
DMK hold		Swing	▼18.78	
