= V. Tamilmani =

Indian politician

Member of the Tamil Nadu Legislative Assembly
- In office 1989–2001
- Preceded by: P. G. Anoor Jegadeesan
- Succeeded by: K. Arumugam
- Constituency: Chengalpattu

Personal details
- Party: Dravida Munnetra Kazhagam

V. Tamilmani was elected to the Tamil Nadu Legislative Assembly from the Chengalpattu constituency in the 1996 elections. He was a candidate of the Dravida Munnetra Kazhagam (DMK) party.

== Electoral performance ==
Election	Constituency	Political party	Result	Vote %	Opposition			Ref
Election	Constituency	Political party	Result	Vote %	Candidate	Political party	Vote %	Ref
1989	Chengalpattu	DMK	Won	45.73%	C. D. Varadarajan	AIADMK	26.54%	
1991	Chengalpattu	DMK	Lost	32.84%	C. D. Varadarajan	AIADMK	48.65%	
1996	Chengalpattu	DMK	Won	57.53%	C. V. N. Kumarasamy	AIADMK	25.66%	
