= Pallavaram Assembly constituency =

State Legislative Assembly constituency in Tamil Nadu, India

Coordinates: 12.97°N 80.15°E

Pallavaram
- Constituency No. 30 for the Tamil Nadu Legislative Assembly

Constituency details
- Country: India
- Region: South India
- State: Tamil Nadu
- District: Chengalpattu
- Lok Sabha constituency: Sriperumbudur
- Established: 2008
- Total electors: 3,37,024 (as of 23 Apr 2026)
- Reservation: None

Member of Legislative Assembly
- 17th Tamil Nadu Legislative Assembly
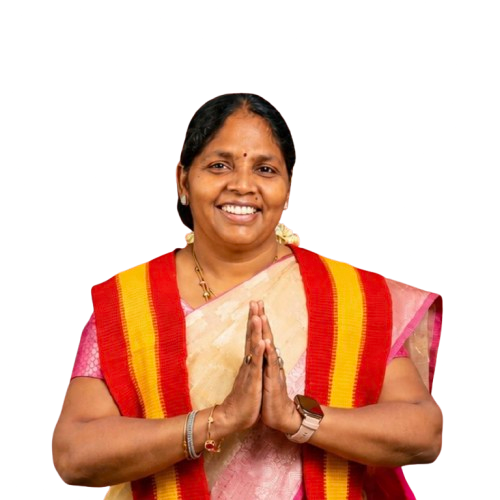
- Incumbent J. Kamatchi
- Party: TVK
- Alliance: TVK+
- Elected year: 2026

Pallavaram is a state assembly constituency in Tamil Nadu, India, that was formed after the constituency delimitation in 2008. Its State Assembly Constituency number is 30. Located in Chengalpattu district, it is included in Sriperumbudur Lok Sabha constituency for national elections. It is one of the 234 State Legislative Assembly Constituencies in Tamil Nadu in India.

It includes All Wards in Zone 1 and Zone 2, Wards comprising Hashinapuram and Nemilicherry villages in Zone 3 of Tambaram City Municipal Corporation, Ward 159 in Zone 12 of Greater Chennai Corporation (Meenambakkam) and Pozhichalur and Tirusulam Villages in St.Thomas Mount Panchayat Union.

== Members of Legislative Assembly ==
Year	Member	Political party
2026	J. Kamatchi	Tamilaga Vettri Kazhagam
2021	I. Karunanithi	Dravida Munnetra Kazhagam
2016	I. Karunanithi	Dravida Munnetra Kazhagam
2011	P. Dhansingh	All India Anna Dravida Munnetra Kazhagam

== Election results ==
Vote share of winning candidates
2026	48.40%
2021	47.50%
2016	44.94%
2011	52.70%

2026 Tamil Nadu Legislative Assembly election: Pallavaram
Party	Candidate	Votes	%	±%
TVK	J. Kamatchi	133,611	47.10	New
DMDK	D. Murugesan	78,918	27.82	▲26.42
AIADMK	V. Venkatesan	48,921	17.25	▼16.05
NTK	Dr. R. Karthikeyan	14,065	4.96	▼3.13
NOTA	NOTA	1,602	0.56	▼0.17
Margin of victory		54,693	19.28	▲5.09
Turnout		2,83,677	84.17	▲23.14
Registered electors		3,37,024		▼99,151
TVK gain from DMK		Swing	▲47.10	

=== 2021 ===
2021 Tamil Nadu Legislative Assembly election: Pallavaram
Party	Candidate	Votes	%	±%
DMK	I. Karunanithi	126,427	47.50	+2.56
AIADMK	S. Rajendran	88,644	33.30	−2.82
NTK	Minishree Kanagaraj	21,522	8.09	+6.3
MNM	Senthil Arumugam	20,774	7.80	New
NOTA	NOTA	1,945	0.73	−1.59
DMDK	Murugesan	3,719	1.40	New
Margin of victory		37,783	14.19	5.37
Turnout		266,190	61.03	−0.72
Rejected ballots		618	0.23	
Registered electors		436,175		
DMK hold		Swing	2.56	

=== 2016 ===
2016 Tamil Nadu Legislative Assembly election: Pallavaram
Party	Candidate	Votes	%	±%
DMK	I. Karunanithi	112,891	44.94	+0.91
AIADMK	C. R. Saraswathi	90,726	36.12	−16.58
MDMK	C. Veeralakshmi	14,083	5.61	New
BJP	Dr. Gopi Ayyaswamy	11,781	4.69	New
PMK	R. Venkatesan	9,339	3.72	New
NOTA	NOTA	5,823	2.32	New
NTK	P. Srinivasa Kumar	4,488	1.79	New
Margin of victory		22,165	8.82	0.16
Turnout		251,204	61.75	−10.45
Registered electors		406,839		
DMK gain from AIADMK		Swing	-7.76	

=== 2011 ===
2011 Tamil Nadu Legislative Assembly election: Pallavaram
Party	Candidate	Votes	%	±%
AIADMK	P. Dhansingh	105,631	52.70	New
DMK	T. M. Anbarasan	88,257	44.03	New
Loktantrik Samajwadi	R. Kumar	1,082	0.54	New
BSP	B. Rajappa	1,074	0.54	New
IJK	R. Samesudoss	1,052	0.52	New
Margin of victory		17,374	8.67	
Turnout		277,671	72.19	
Registered electors		200,455		
AIADMK win (new seat)				
