= N. C. Kanagavalli =

Indian politician

N. C. Kanagavalli was an Indian politician and former Member of the Legislative Assembly. She was elected to the Tamil Nadu legislative assembly as an Anna Dravida Munnetra Kazhagam candidate from Vilathikulam constituency in 1991 election. She took steps for the upliftment to the people of vilathilulam.
