= R. Selvam =

Indian politician

R. Selvam was elected to the Tamil Nadu Legislative Assembly from the Kulittalai constituency in the 1996 elections. He was a candidate of the Dravida Munnetra Kazhagam (DMK) party. He has a brother called Bar Sheffer.
