= K. Arumugam (Chengalpattu) =

Indian politician (born 1958)

Member of the Legislative Assembly-Tamilnadu
- In office 2001–2006
- Preceded by: V. Tamilmani
- Constituency: Chengalpattu
- In office 2006–2011
- Succeeded by: D. Murugesan

Personal details
- Born: 6 June 1958 Thirukachur
- Party: Pattali Makkal Katchi
- Profession: Farmer, Mill Owner

K. Arumugam is an Indian politician and a former Member of the Legislative Assembly (MLA) of Tamil Nadu. He hails from the village of Thirukachur in the Chengalpattu district.

A graduate with a Bachelor of Science (B.Sc.) degree, he is a member of the Pattali Makkal Katchi (PMK) party. He was elected to the Tamil Nadu Legislative Assembly from the Chengalpattu Assembly constituency in the 2001 and 2006 state elections.

== Electoral performance ==
Election	Constituency	Political party	Result	Vote %	Opposition			Ref
Election	Constituency	Political party	Result	Vote %	Candidate	Political party	Vote %	Ref
2001	Chengalpattu	PMK	Won	43.50%	V. Viswanathan	DMK	39.23%	
2006	Chengalpattu	PMK	Won	48.37%	S. Arumugam	AIADMK	40.36%	
2016	Chengalpattu	PMK	Lost	8.37%	M. Varalakshmi	DMK	45.11%	
