= P. Dhansingh =

Indian politician

Member of the Tamil Nadu Legislative Assembly
- In office 2011–2016
- Constituency: Pallavaram Assembly constituency

Personal details
- Party: All India Anna Dravida Munnetra Kazhagam

P. Dhansingh is an Indian politician and was a member of the 14th Tamil Nadu Legislative Assembly from the Pallavaram constituency. He represented the All India Anna Dravida Munnetra Kazhagam party.

The elections of 2016 resulted in his constituency being won by I. Karunanithi. Dhansingh was one of thirteen AIADMK MLAs in the Greater Chennai area who were deselected by the party, apparently in an attempt to thwart a potential anti-incumbency backlash from the electorate following the recent flooding. It was felt that fresh faces would put some distance between the past and the present.
