= R. Manickam =

Indian politician

Member of the Tamil Nadu Legislative Assembly
- Incumbent
- Assumed office 12 May 2021
- Preceded by: N. R. Chandrasekar
- Succeeded by: E. Ramar
- Constituency: Kulithalai
- In office May 2006 - April 2011
- Preceded by: A. Pappa Sundaram
- Succeeded by: A. Pappa Sundaram

Personal details
- Party: Dravida Munnetra Kazhagam

R. Manickam is an Indian politician who is a Member of Legislative Assembly of Tamil Nadu. He was elected from Kulithalai as a Dravida Munnetra Kazhagam candidate in 2006 and 2021.

== Elections contested ==
Election	Constituency	Party	Result	Vote %	Runner-up	Runner-up Party	Runner-up vote %	Ref.
2021 Tamil Nadu Legislative Assembly election	Kulithalai	DMK	Won	51.37%	N. R. Chandrasekar	ADMK	39.38%	
2011 Tamil Nadu Legislative Assembly election	Kulithalai	AIADMK	Lost	40.70%	A. Pappa Sundaram	AIADMK	54.78%	
2006 Tamil Nadu Legislative Assembly election	Kulithalai	DMK	Won	52.78%	A. Pappa Sundaram	AIADMK	39.46%	
