= S. Thiyagarajan =

Indian politician (born 1989)

Soundarajan Thiyagarajan (born 1989) is an Indian politician from Tamil Nadu. He is a member of the Tamil Nadu Legislative Assembly from Chengalpattu Assembly constituency in Chengalpattu district representing Tamilaga Vettri Kazhagam.

== Early life and education ==
Thiyagarajan is from Chengalpattu, Tamil Nadu. He is the son of Soundarajan. He is a self-employed graduate. He did his Diploma in Electrical & Electronics Engineering at Sri Balaji Polytechnic College in 2010 and later completed his B.Tech (EEE) at SRM University in 2016. He declared assets worth Rs.94 lakhs in his affidavit to the Election Commission of India.

== Career ==
Thiyagarajan became an MLA for the first time winning the 2026 Tamil Nadu Legislative Assembly election from Chengalpattu Assembly constituency representing Tamilaga Vettri Kazhagam. He polled 1,37,136 votes and defeated his nearest rival, M. K. T. Karthik Dhandapani of the Dravida Munnetra Kazhagam, by a margin of 35,641 votes.

== Electoral performance ==
| Election | Constituency | Political party | Result | Vote % | Opposition | | | Ref |
| Election | Constituency | Political party | Result | Vote % | Candidate | Political party | Vote % | Ref |
|---|---|---|---|---|---|---|---|---|
| 2026 | Chengalpattu | TVK | Won | 42.32% | Karthik Dhandapani | DMK | 31.32% | - |
