= Namma Veedu Vasanta Bhavan =

Indian vegetarian restaurant chain

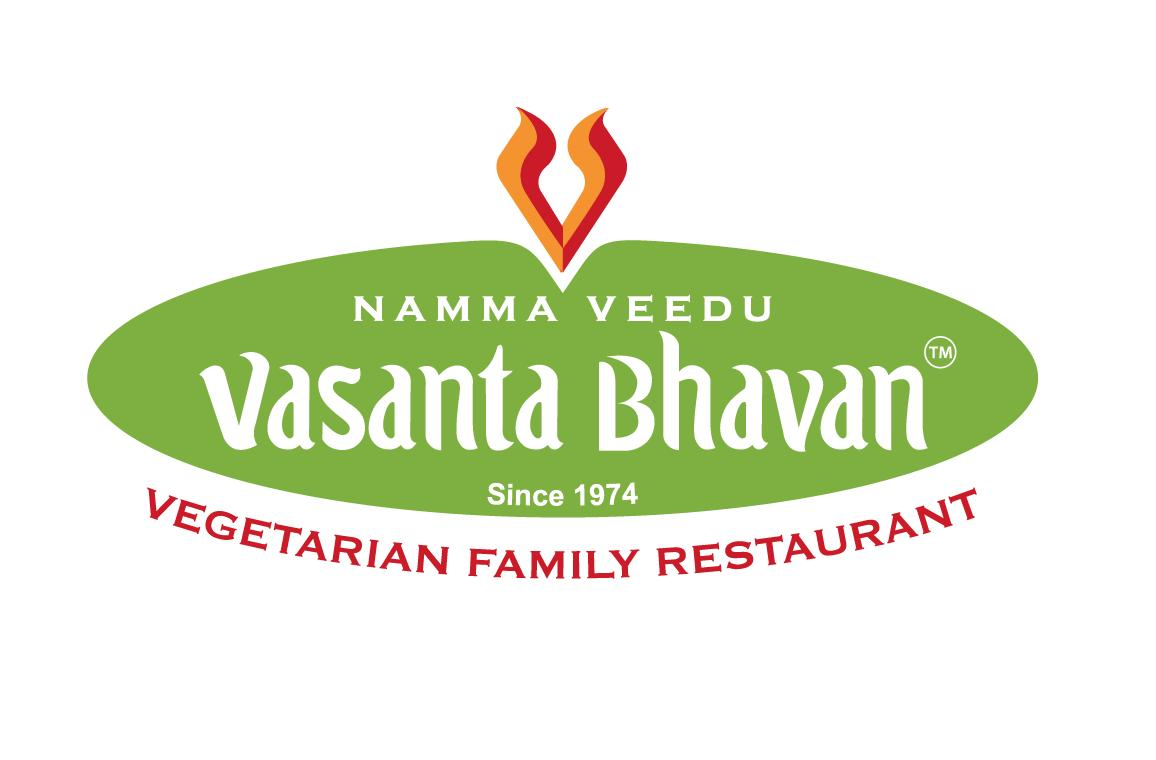
- Type: Restaurant Chain
- Industry: Restaurant
- Genre: South Indian Vegetarian Cuisine
- Founded: 1969 - Trichy,1974 - Chennai
- Founder: Muthukrishnan
- Headquarters: Chennai, India
- Area served: India, Dubai, London, Oman, Qatar,Riyadh.
- Key people: Ravi; Swarnalatha Ravi
- Website: www.vasantabhavan.in

Namma Veedu Vasanta Bhavan (Tamil: நம்ம வீடு வஸந்த பவன்) is a chain of vegetarian restaurants headquartered in Egmore, Chennai, India, started in 1969.

== History ==
Vasanta Bhavan restaurant was started in Trichy by Patron Mr. A. Muthukrishnan. Mr.A.Muthukrishnan started branches in Chennai. The chain of restaurants handled by Mr. M. Ravi was changed to Namma Veedu Vasanta Bhavan chain of restaurants. He is also the Vice President of the Tamil Nadu Hotels Association.

== ISO 22000:2005 ==
Vasanta Bhavan has been accredited with the ISO 22000:2005 quality certificate from QMS, a UK-based company.
For ISO 22000:2005 Certification Click Here

== The Spring Hotel ==
The Spring is Chennai's first all-suite hotel that is owned by superstar Rajinikanth who leased out the restaurant to Vasanta Bhavan.

== Catering division ==
Apart from the restaurant division, Namma Veedu Vasanta Bhavan also undertakes catering orders for individuals and corporates. A Food and Beverage Manager assisted by a team of chefs, look after the health aspects. The committee not only works on the taste and the quality but also works on the nutrition value. Namma Veedu Vasanta Bhavan is also operating as the official caterers at companies such as Mahindra Satyam, Sutherland Global Services Limited, FL Smidth, Siemens Shared Services and the HCL Technologies.

== Branches in Chennai ==
- Egmore
- Egmore ll
- Mylapore
- Tambaram
- Vadapalani Arcot Road
- 100 feet road, Vadapalani
- Nungambakkam
- Medavakkam
- Vikravandi
- Maduravoyal
- Phoenix Market City, Velachery
- Neelankarai
- Chromepet
- Villupuram

== See also ==
- List of vegetarian and vegan restaurants
