= I. Karunanithi =

Indian politician

Member of the Tamil Nadu Legislative Assembly
- In office 19 May 2016 – 6 May 2026
- Preceded by: S. Rajendran
- Succeeded by: P. Dhansingh
- Constituency: Pallavaram

Personal details
- Party: Dravida Munnetra Kazhagam
- Relatives: Anto Mathivanan (Son ), Merlina Ann (Daughter-in-law)

I. Karunanithi is an Indian politician who is a Member of Legislative Assembly of Tamil Nadu. He was elected from Pallavaram as a Dravida Munnetra Kazhagam candidate in 2021.

== Electoral performance ==
2021 Tamil Nadu Legislative Assembly election: Pallavaram
Party	Candidate	Votes	%	±%
DMK	I. Karunanithi	126,427	47.50%	+2.56
AIADMK	S. Rajendran	88,644	33.30%	−2.82
NTK	Minishree Kanagaraj	21,522	8.09%	+6.3
MNM	Senthil Arumugam	20,774	7.80%	New
NOTA	NOTA	1,945	0.73%	−1.59
DMDK	Murugesan	3,719	1.40%	New
Margin of victory		37,783	14.19%	5.37%
Turnout		266,190	61.03%	−0.72%
Rejected ballots		618	0.23%	
Registered electors		436,175		
DMK hold		Swing	2.56%	

2016 Tamil Nadu Legislative Assembly election: Pallavaram
Party	Candidate	Votes	%	±%
DMK	I. Karunanithi	112,891	44.94%	+0.91
AIADMK	C. R. Saraswathi	90,726	36.12%	−16.58
MDMK	C. Veeralakshmi	14,083	5.61%	New
BJP	Dr. Gopi Ayyaswamy	11,781	4.69%	New
PMK	R. Venkatesan	9,339	3.72%	New
NOTA	NOTA	5,823	2.32%	New
NTK	P. Srinivasa Kumar	4,488	1.79%	New
Margin of victory		22,165	8.82%	0.16%
Turnout		251,204	61.75%	−10.45%
Registered electors		406,839		
DMK gain from AIADMK		Swing	-7.76%	
