= Chengalpattu Assembly constituency =

State Legislative Assembly Constituency in Tamil Nadu

Coordinates: 12°41′N 79°59′E

Chengalpattu
- Constituency No. 32 for the Tamil Nadu Legislative Assembly

Constituency details
- Country: India
- Region: South India
- State: Tamil Nadu
- District: Chengalpattu
- Lok Sabha constituency: Kancheepuram
- Established: 1951
- Total electors: 3,72,889
- Reservation: None

Member of Legislative Assembly
- 17th Tamil Nadu Legislative Assembly
- Incumbent S. Thiyagarajan
- Party: TVK
- Elected year: 2026

Chengalpattu is a state assembly constituency in Chengalpattu district, Tamil Nadu, India. It is one of the 234 assembly constituencies in Tamil Nadu and comprises parts of Chengalpattu taluk. It forms part of Kancheepuram Lok Sabha constituency for national elections to the Parliament of India.

== Members of the Legislative Assembly ==
Election	Member	Party
1952	K. Vinayakam	Kisan Mazdoor Praja Party
1957	Muthuswamy Naickar	Indian National Congress
1957	Appavu	Indian National Congress
1962	C. G. Viswanathan	Dravida Munnetra Kazhagam
1967	C. G. Viswanathan	Dravida Munnetra Kazhagam
1971	C. G. Viswanathan	Dravida Munnetra Kazhagam
1977	P. G. Anoor Jegadeesan	All India Anna Dravida Munnetra Kazhagam
1980	P. G. Anoor Jegadeesan	All India Anna Dravida Munnetra Kazhagam
1984	P. G. Anoor Jegadeesan	All India Anna Dravida Munnetra Kazhagam
1989	V. Tamilmani	Dravida Munnetra Kazhagam
1991	C. D. Varadarajan	All India Anna Dravida Munnetra Kazhagam
1996	V. Tamilmani	Dravida Munnetra Kazhagam
2001	K. Arumugam	Pattali Makkal Katchi
2006	K. Arumugam	Pattali Makkal Katchi
2011	D. Murugesan	Desiya Murpokku Dravida Kazhagam
2016	M. Varalakshmi	Dravida Munnetra Kazhagam
2021	M. Varalakshmi	Dravida Munnetra Kazhagam
2026	S. Thiyagarajan	Tamilaga Vettri Kazhagam

Madras State

== Election results ==
Vote share of winning candidates
2026	42.32%
2021	48.18%
2016	45.11%
2011	44.58%
2006	48.37%
2001	43.50%
1996	57.53%
1991	48.65%
1989	45.73%
1984	50.14%
1980	53.07%
1977	43.50%
1971	62.09%
1967	62.77%
1962	50.32%
1957	24.73%
1952	45.38%

=== Assembly election 2026 ===
2026 Tamil Nadu Legislative Assembly election : Chengalpattu
Party	Candidate	Votes	%	±%
TVK	S. Thiyagarajan	137,136	42.32%	New
DMK	Karthik Dhandapani	101,495	31.32%	▼16.86
AIADMK	M. Gajendran	69,763	21.53%	New
NTK	Amutha. N	12,032	3.71%	▼6.20
NOTA	None of the above	1,395	0.43%	▼0.70
Margin of victory		35,641	11.00%	▲1.16
Turnout		324,093	86.91%	▲22.82
Total valid votes		324,010		
Registered electors		372,889		▼12.97
TVK gain from DMK		Swing	▼5.86	

=== Assembly election 2021 ===
2021 Tamil Nadu Legislative Assembly election : Chengalpattu
Party	Candidate	Votes	%	±%
DMK	M. Varalakshmi	130,573	48.18%	▲3.07
AIADMK	M. Gajendran	103,908	38.34%	▲3.76
NTK	K. Sanjeevinathan	26,868	9.91%	▲8.29
IJK	S. Muthamilselvan	4,146	1.53%	▲0.92
NOTA	None of the above	3,075	1.13%	▼0.30
AMMK	A. Sathishkumar	3,069	1.13%	New
Margin of victory		26,665	9.84%	▼0.69
Turnout		274,566	64.09%	▼3.22
Total valid votes		271,012		
Rejected ballots		479	0.17%	▲0.16
Registered electors		428,440		▲15.45
DMK hold		Swing		

=== Assembly election 2016 ===
2016 Tamil Nadu Legislative Assembly election : Chengalpattu
Party	Candidate	Votes	%	±%
DMK	M. Varalakshmi	112,675	45.11%	New
AIADMK	R. Kamalakkannan	86,383	34.58%	New
PMK	K. Arumugam	20,899	8.37%	▼36.05
DMDK	D. Murugesan	17,438	6.98%	▼37.60
NTK	K. Sanjeevinathan	4,035	1.62%	New
NOTA	None of the above	3,584	1.43%	New
IJK	S. Muthamilselvan	1,517	0.61%	▼1.14
Margin of victory		26,292	10.53%	▲10.37
Turnout		249,792	67.31%	▼6.77
Total valid votes		249,774		
Rejected ballots		18	0.01%	▼0.05
Registered electors		371,109		▲47.03
DMK gain from DMDK		Swing	▲0.53	

=== Assembly election 2011 ===
2011 Tamil Nadu Legislative Assembly election : Chengalpattu
Party	Candidate	Votes	%	±%
DMDK	D. Murugesan	83,297	44.58%	▲37.64
PMK	V. G. Rangasamy	83,006	44.42%	▼3.95
Akhila India Jananayaka Makkal Katchi (Dr. Issac)	M. Panneer Selvam	4,124	2.21%	New
BJP	K. T. Raghavan	4,073	2.18%	▲1.60
Independent	R. Murugan	3,597	1.92%	
IJK	S. Muthamilselvan	3,265	1.75%	New
BSP	L. Durairaj	1,167	0.62%	▲0.17
Margin of victory		291	0.16%	▼7.85
Turnout		186,986	74.08%	▲2.65
Total valid votes		186,867		
Rejected ballots		119	0.06%	▲0.06
Registered electors		252,409		▲41.43
DMDK gain from PMK		Swing	▼3.79	

=== Assembly election 2006 ===
2006 Tamil Nadu Legislative Assembly election : Chengalpattu
Party	Candidate	Votes	%	±%
PMK	K. Arumugam	61,664	48.37%	▲4.87
AIADMK	S. Arumugam	51,451	40.36%	New
DMDK	S. Manjula	8,852	6.94%	New
Independent	M. Jeevarathinam	1,880	1.47%	
Independent	P. Prakashbabu	871	0.68%	
Margin of victory		10,213	8.01%	▲3.74
Turnout		127,479	71.43%	▲12.30
Total valid votes		127,475		
Registered electors		178,466		▼12.52
PMK hold		Swing		

=== Assembly election 2001 ===
2001 Tamil Nadu Legislative Assembly election : Chengalpattu
Party	Candidate	Votes	%	±%
PMK	K. Arumugam	52,465	43.50%	▲33.14
DMK	V. Viswanathan	47,316	39.23%	▼18.30
MDMK	E. Sathya	15,617	12.95%	▲7.95
Independent	Venkatesan. V	1,663	1.38%	
Puratchi Bharatham	Ramesh. K	990	0.82%	New
Independent	Subramanian. E	826	0.68%	
Margin of victory		5,149	4.27%	▼27.60
Turnout		120,628	59.13%	▼9.57
Total valid votes		120,607		
Rejected ballots		15	0.01%	▼3.95
Registered electors		204,010		▲16.92
PMK gain from DMK		Swing	▼14.03	

=== Assembly election 1996 ===
1996 Tamil Nadu Legislative Assembly election : Chengalpattu
Party	Candidate	Votes	%	±%
DMK	V. Tamilmani	66,443	57.53%	▲24.69
AIADMK	C. V. N. Kumarasamy	29,638	25.66%	New
PMK	C. R. Bhaskaran	11,969	10.36%	▼6.32
MDMK	N. Radhakrishnan	5,776	5.00%	New
BJP	N. J. Veeraraghavan	848	0.73%	▼0.46
Margin of victory		36,805	31.87%	▲16.06
Turnout		119,875	68.70%	▲0.48
Total valid votes		115,493		
Rejected ballots		4,745	3.96%	▲1.65
Registered electors		174,487		▲9.43
DMK gain from AIADMK		Swing	▲8.88	

=== Assembly election 1991 ===
1991 Tamil Nadu Legislative Assembly election : Chengalpattu
Party	Candidate	Votes	%	±%
AIADMK	C. D. Varadarajan	51,694	48.65%	New
DMK	V. Tamilmani	34,896	32.84%	▼12.89
PMK	C. R. Bhaskaran	17,725	16.68%	New
BJP	A. N. Elumalai	1,262	1.19%	New
Margin of victory		16,798	15.81%	▼3.38
Turnout		108,776	68.22%	▲6.71
Total valid votes		106,266		
Rejected ballots		2,510	2.31%	▲0.22
Registered electors		159,450		▲12.76
AIADMK gain from DMK		Swing	▲2.92	

=== Assembly election 1989 ===
1989 Tamil Nadu Legislative Assembly election : Chengalpattu
Party	Candidate	Votes	%	±%
DMK	V. Tamilmani	38,948	45.73%	▼3.07
AIADMK	C. D. Varadarajan	22,607	26.54%	New
INC	R. Vasudevan	12,866	15.11%	New
AIADMK	Ponkumar	5,342	6.27%	New
Independent	T. Munusamy	3,545	4.16%	
Margin of victory		16,341	19.19%	▲17.84
Turnout		86,983	61.51%	▼15.69
Total valid votes		85,167		
Rejected ballots		1,816	2.09%	▼0.29
Registered electors		141,410		▲17.64
DMK gain from AIADMK		Swing	▼4.41	

=== Assembly election 1984 ===
1984 Tamil Nadu Legislative Assembly election : Chengalpattu
Party	Candidate	Votes	%	±%
AIADMK	P. G. Anoor Jegadeesan	45,423	50.14%	▼2.93
DMK	V. Rudrakotti	44,203	48.80%	New
Margin of victory		1,220	1.35%	▼5.41
Turnout		92,799	77.20%	▲15.31
Total valid votes		90,587		
Rejected ballots		2,212	2.38%	▲1.00
Registered electors		120,202		▼3.78
AIADMK hold		Swing		

=== Assembly election 1980 ===
1980 Tamil Nadu Legislative Assembly election : Chengalpattu
Party	Candidate	Votes	%	±%
AIADMK	P. G. Anoor Jegadeesan	40,466	53.07%	New
INC	K. Natarajan	35,314	46.32%	▲39.98
Independent	S. P. Ramachandran	465	0.61%	
Margin of victory		5,152	6.76%	▲1.02
Turnout		77,315	61.89%	
Total valid votes		76,245		
Rejected ballots		1,070	1.38%	▼0.16
Registered electors		124,925		▲12.98
AIADMK gain from AIADMK		Swing	▲9.57	

=== Assembly election 1977 ===
1977 Tamil Nadu Legislative Assembly election : Chengalpattu
Party	Candidate	Votes	%	±%
AIADMK	P. G. Anoor Jegadeesan	29,306	43.50%	New
DMK	V. Rudrakotti	25,436	37.75%	▼24.34
JP	B. S. Raghupathy	6,942	10.30%	New
INC	P. Dhanpal Nayagar	4,275	6.34%	New
Independent	N. E. Mahboob Basha	611	0.91%	
Independent	M. Vedachalam	504	0.75%	
Margin of victory		3,870	5.74%	▼29.28
Turnout		68,431	61.89%	▼10.21
Total valid votes		67,377		
Rejected ballots		1,054	1.54%	▲1.54
Registered electors		110,575		▲11.70
AIADMK gain from DMK		Swing	▼18.59	

=== Assembly election 1971 ===
1971 Tamil Nadu Legislative Assembly election : Chengalpattu
Party	Candidate	Votes	%	±%
DMK	C. G. Viswanathan	41,949	62.09%	▼0.68
INC	S. T. Neelakantan	18,290	27.07%	New
Independent	P. Ramakrishnan	3,748	5.55%	
Independent	U. T. Krishnasamy	1,455	2.15%	
Independent	P. Ramasamy	1,264	1.87%	
Margin of victory		23,659	35.02%	▲0.98
Turnout		71,372	72.10%	▼6.93
Total valid votes		67,558		
Registered electors		98,995		▲9.06
DMK hold		Swing		

=== Assembly election 1967 ===
1967 Madras State Legislative Assembly election : Chengalpattu
Party	Candidate	Votes	%	±%
DMK	C. G. Viswanathan	43,428	62.77%	▲12.45
INC	T. Naicker	19,879	28.73%	▼17.77
Independent	Narasimhan	5,879	8.50%	
Margin of victory		23,549	34.04%	▲30.21
Turnout		71,739	79.03%	▲2.85
Total valid votes		69,186		
Registered electors		90,773		▲18.28
DMK hold		Swing		

=== Assembly election 1962 ===
1962 Madras State Legislative Assembly election : Chengalpattu
Party	Candidate	Votes	%	±%
DMK	C. G. Viswanathan	27,933	50.32%	New
INC	G. Rajarathana Nayagar	25,809	46.50%	▼2.29
Independent	T. M. Ramaswamy	1,767	3.18%	
Margin of victory		2,124	3.83%	▲0.40
Turnout		58,460	76.18%	▲0.89
Total valid votes		55,509		
Registered electors		76,741		▼46.22
DMK gain from INC		Swing	▲25.59	

=== Assembly election 1957 ===
1957 Madras State Legislative Assembly election : Chengalpattu
Party	Candidate	Votes	%	±%
INC	Muthuswamy Naickar	26,568	24.73%	▼1.34
INC	Appavu	25,854	24.06%	▼2.01
Independent	Ramachandran	22,884	21.30%	
Independent	Rathinam	21,682	20.18%	
Independent	Paramasivan	10,453	9.73%	
Margin of victory		3,684	3.43%	▼15.88
Turnout		107,441	75.29%	▲30.60
Total valid votes		107,441		
Registered electors		142,694		▲97.14
INC gain from KMPP		Swing	▼20.65	

=== Assembly election 1952 ===
1952 Madras State Legislative Assembly election : Chengalpattu
Party	Candidate	Votes	%	±%
KMPP	K. Vinayakam	14,681	45.38%	New
INC	U. L. Raja	8,435	26.07%	New
RPI	Paramasivan	3,185	9.85%	New
Independent	M. Palaniswamy	1,964	6.07%	New
Union	Govindarajulu Reddiar	1,643	5.08%	New
Independent	Elumalai Naicker	1,276	3.94%	New
Independent	P. V. Srinivasan	1,167	3.61%	New
Margin of victory		6,246	19.31%	
Turnout		32,351	44.69%	
Total valid votes		32,351		
Registered electors		72,383		
KMPP win (new seat)				
