= N. K. Perumal =

Indian politician

N. K. Perumal was an Indian politician and former Member of the Legislative Assembly. He was elected to the Tamil Nadu legislative assembly as an Anna Dravida Munnetra Kazhagam candidate from Vilathikulam constituency in 2001 election.
