= Vilathikulam Assembly constituency =

One of the 234 State Legislative Assembly Constituencies in Tamil Nadu

Coordinates: 9°07′50.55″N 78°09′28.58″E

Vilathikulam
- Constituency No. 213 for the Tamil Nadu Legislative Assembly
- Area of Vilathikulam State Assembly Constituency

Constituency details
- Country: India
- Region: South India
- State: Tamil Nadu
- District: Thoothukudi
- Lok Sabha constituency: Thoothukkudi
- Established: 1951
- Total electors: 204,982
- Reservation: None

Member of Legislative Assembly
- 17th Tamil Nadu Legislative Assembly
- Incumbent V. Markandayan
- Party: DMK
- Alliance: SPA
- Elected year: 2026

Vilathikulam is one of the 234 state legislative assembly constituencies in Tamil Nadu, in southern India. It is also one of the six state legislative assembly constituencies included in Thoothukkudi Lok Sabha constituency. It is one of the oldest assembly segments in Tamil Nadu, being in existence since independence.

== Members of Legislative Assembly ==
Election	Assembly	Member	Political Party	Tenure
1952	1st	P. Selvaraj	Indian National Congress	1952-1957
1967	4th	M. Rathinasabapathy	Dravida Munnetra Kazhagam	1967-1971
1971	5th	M. Rathinasabapathy	Dravida Munnetra Kazhagam	1971-1977
1977	6th	R. K. Perumal	All India Anna Dravida Munnetra Kazhagam	1977-1980
1980	7th	R. K. Perumal	All India Anna Dravida Munnetra Kazhagam	1980-1984
1984	8th	S. Kumaragurubara Ramanathan	Dravida Munnetra Kazhagam	1984-1989
1989	9th	K. K. S. S. R. Ramachandran	All India Anna Dravida Munnetra Kazhagam	1989-1991
1991	10th	N. C. Kanagavalli	All India Anna Dravida Munnetra Kazhagam	1991-1996
1996	11th	K. Ravisankar	Dravida Munnetra Kazhagam	1996-2001
2001	12th	N. K. Perumal	All India Anna Dravida Munnetra Kazhagam	2001-2006
2006	13th	P. Chinnappan	All India Anna Dravida Munnetra Kazhagam	2006-2011
2011	14th	GV. Markandayan	All India Anna Dravida Munnetra Kazhagam	2011-2016
2016	15th	K. Uma Maheswari	All India Anna Dravida Munnetra Kazhagam	2016-2019
2019	15th	P. Chinnappan	All India Anna Dravida Munnetra Kazhagam	2019-2021
2021	16th	GV. Markandayan	Dravida Munnetra Kazhagam	2021-Incumbent
2026	17th	GV. Markandayan	Dravida Munnetra Kazhagam	2021-Incumbent

== Election results ==
Vote share of winning candidates
2026	33.4%
2021	54.38%
2019 by-election	44.32%
2016	46.79%
2011	54.58%
2006	46.73%
2001	48.16%
1996	32.10%
1991	62.10%
1989	36.59%
1984	40.52%
1980	53.75%
1977	38.39%
1971	57.33%
1967	37.47%
1952	50.44%

=== 2026 ===
2026 Tamil Nadu Legislative Assembly election: Vilathikulam
Party	Candidate	Votes	%	±%
DMK	Markandayan G V	58,395	33.40	▼20.98
TVK	Kasiram	50,167	28.70	New
AIADMK	R. Sathya	48,879	27.96	▼3.22
NTK	Balaji Ramachandran	11,780	6.74	▼0.38
PT	P Madasamy	2,057	1.18	▲0.54
AIPTMMK	C Ponpandi	1,380	0.79	New
NOTA	None of the above	642	0.37	
Margin of victory		8,228		
Turnout		1,74,814		
Rejected ballots				
Registered electors		203,732		
gain from		Swing		

=== 2021 ===
2021 Tamil Nadu Legislative Assembly election: Vilathikulam
Party	Candidate	Votes	%	±%
DMK	G. V. Markandayan	90,348	54.38	+19.84
AIADMK	P. Chinnappan	51,799	31.18	−15.61
NTK	R. Balaji	11,828	7.12	+5.96
AMMK	K. Seeni Selvi	6,657	4.01	New
MNM	X. Wilson	1,520	0.91	New
PT	C. Muthukumar	1,055	0.64	New
NOTA	NOTA	1,036	0.62	−0.41
Margin of victory		38,549	23.20	10.95
Turnout		166,133	76.72	2.44
Rejected ballots		264	0.16	
Registered electors		216,542		
DMK gain from AIADMK		Swing	27.77	

=== 2019 by-election ===
2019 Tamil Nadu Legislative Assembly bye-election: Vilathikulam
Party	Candidate	Votes	%	±%
AIADMK	P. Chinnappan	70,139	44.32	▼2.47
DMK	A. C. Jayakumar	41,585	26.28	▼8.26
Independent	G. V. Markandayan	27,456	17.35	New
Amma Makkal Munnettra Kazagam	K. Jothimony	9,695	6.13	New
NTK	M. Kalidoss	4,628	2.93	▲1.77
MNM	T. Natarajan	1,399	0.88	New
None of the Above	None of the Above	1,386	0.88	▼0.15
Majority		28,554	18.04	▲5.79
Turnout		158,289	75.65	▲1.37
AIADMK hold		Swing	▼2.47	

=== 2016 ===
2016 Tamil Nadu Legislative Assembly election: Vilathikulam
Party	Candidate	Votes	%	±%
AIADMK	K. Uma Maheswari	71,496	46.79	−7.79
DMK	S. Beemaraj	52,778	34.54	New
TMC(M)	P. Kathirvel	15,030	9.84	New
BJP	P. Rama Moorthy	6,441	4.22	+3.09
NTK	G. N. Marudhanayagam	1,766	1.16	New
NOTA	NOTA	1,581	1.03	New
BSP	I. Subbulakshmi	850	0.56	−0.51
Margin of victory		18,718	12.25	−4.70
Turnout		152,795	74.28	−1.72
Registered electors		205,689		
AIADMK hold		Swing	-7.79	

=== 2011 ===
2011 Tamil Nadu Legislative Assembly election: Vilathikulam
Party	Candidate	Votes	%	±%
AIADMK	G. V. Markandayan	72,753	54.58	+7.85
INC	K. Perumalsamy	50,156	37.63	New
Independent	M. Karuthu Maiyanan	2,378	1.78	New
Independent	G. Manthiramuthu	1,795	1.35	New
BJP	K. Sundaramoorthy	1,499	1.12	−0.11
BSP	S. Ayyadurai	1,423	1.07	−3.08
Independent	P. S. Ayyanar	1,102	0.83	New
Independent	G. Nadaraj	806	0.60	New
Margin of victory		22,597	16.95	9.08
Turnout		133,292	76.01	10.27
Registered electors		175,367		
AIADMK hold		Swing	7.85	

=== 2006 ===
2006 Tamil Nadu Legislative Assembly election: Vilathikulam
Party	Candidate	Votes	%	±%
AIADMK	P. Chinnappan	45,409	46.73	−1.43
DMK	K. Rajaram	37,755	38.85	+7.22
DMDK	S. Balakrishnan	5,779	5.95	New
PT	P.Lingaraj	4,026	4.14	New
BJP	V. P. Jayaraj	1,197	1.23	New
Independent	A. Nataraj	1,077	1.11	New
AIFB	R. Murugapandian	710	0.73	New
Independent	M. Gandhi	541	0.56	New
Margin of victory		7,654	7.88	−8.65
Turnout		97,171	65.73	4.85
Registered electors		147,823		
AIADMK hold		Swing	-1.43	

=== 2001 ===
2001 Tamil Nadu Legislative Assembly election: Vilathikulam
Party	Candidate	Votes	%	±%
AIADMK	N. K. Perumal	44,415	48.16	+20.63
DMK	R. K. P. Rajasekaran	29,172	31.63	−0.47
MDMK	Kumara Gurubara Ramanathan	16,237	17.61	−13.82
Independent	K. Boominathan	1,331	1.44	New
Independent	K. Selvaraj	1,066	1.16	New
Margin of victory		15,243	16.53	15.85
Turnout		92,221	60.88	−4.40
Registered electors		151,571		
AIADMK gain from DMK		Swing	16.06	

=== 1996 ===
1996 Tamil Nadu Legislative Assembly election: Vilathikulam
Party	Candidate	Votes	%	±%
DMK	K. Ravisankar	30,190	32.10	−4.9
MDMK	Vai. Gopalsamy	29,556	31.43	New
AIADMK	N. K. Perumal	25,891	27.53	−34.57
PMK	Krishna Kanthan Yadhav	3,374	3.59	New
Independent	K. Shanmugavel	1,749	1.86	New
Independent	A. Selvarajar	1,369	1.46	New
BJP	P. Rajammal	918	0.98	New
Margin of victory		634	0.67	−24.43
Turnout		94,040	65.29	5.15
Registered electors		149,924		
DMK gain from AIADMK		Swing	-30.00	

=== 1991 ===
1991 Tamil Nadu Legislative Assembly election: Vilathikulam
Party	Candidate	Votes	%	±%
AIADMK	N. C. Kanagavalli	53,713	62.10	+25.51
DMK	K. Muthuraj	32,004	37.00	+9.03
Margin of victory		21,709	25.10	16.48
Turnout		86,489	60.13	−10.16
Registered electors		147,419		
AIADMK hold		Swing	25.51	

=== 1989 ===
1989 Tamil Nadu Legislative Assembly election: Vilathikulam
Party	Candidate	Votes	%	±%
AIADMK	K. K. S. S. R. Ramachandran	33,951	36.59	+3.98
DMK	S. Kumaragurubara Ramanathan	25,955	27.97	−12.55
AIADMK	M. Deivendran	21,486	23.16	−9.46
INC	K. S. K. Subba Reddiar	6,247	6.73	New
Independent	P. Subburam	3,624	3.91	New
Independent	M. John	691	0.74	New
Margin of victory		7,996	8.62	0.71
Turnout		92,781	70.29	1.15
Registered electors		134,566		
AIADMK gain from DMK		Swing	-3.93	

=== 1984 ===
1984 Tamil Nadu Legislative Assembly election: Vilathikulam
Party	Candidate	Votes	%	±%
DMK	S. Kumara Kurubara Ramanathan	32,481	40.52	−4.47
AIADMK	R. K. Perumal	26,143	32.62	−21.14
Independent	M. Deivendran	20,326	25.36	New
Margin of victory		6,338	7.91	−0.86
Turnout		80,153	69.14	3.24
Registered electors		121,435		
DMK gain from AIADMK		Swing	-13.23	

=== 1980 ===
1980 Tamil Nadu Legislative Assembly election: Vilathikulam
Party	Candidate	Votes	%	±%
AIADMK	R. K. Perumal	40,728	53.75	+15.37
DMK	S. Kumaragurubara Ramanathan	34,088	44.99	+31.8
Margin of victory		6,640	8.76	3.65
Turnout		75,766	65.90	7.45
Registered electors		116,745		
AIADMK hold		Swing	15.37	

=== 1977 ===
1977 Tamil Nadu Legislative Assembly election: Vilathikulam
Party	Candidate	Votes	%	±%
AIADMK	R. K. Perumal	25,384	38.39	New
INC	K. Subba Reddiar	22,001	33.27	−5.61
DMK	A. K. Kondu Reddiar	8,720	13.19	−44.14
JP	A. A. Arulanandam	8,452	12.78	New
Independent	Ramaswamy Reddiar	706	1.07	New
AIFB	K. P. Ganapathy	579	0.88	New
Margin of victory		3,383	5.12	−13.33
Turnout		66,125	58.44	−7.76
Registered electors		114,745		
AIADMK gain from DMK		Swing	-18.94	

=== 1971 ===
1971 Tamil Nadu Legislative Assembly election: Vilathikulam
Party	Candidate	Votes	%	±%
DMK	M. Rathnasabapathy	32,583	57.33	+19.86
INC	K. Subba Reddiar	22,097	38.88	+8.25
Independent	S. Ramalingam	2,154	3.79	New
Margin of victory		10,486	18.45	12.88
Turnout		56,834	66.20	−12.06
Registered electors		90,503		
DMK hold		Swing	19.86	

=== 1967 ===
1967 Madras Legislative Assembly election: Vilathikulam
Party	Candidate	Votes	%	±%
DMK	M. Rathnasabapathy	23,905	37.47	New
Independent	M. P. S. Reddiar	20,350	31.90	New
INC	A. L. R. Naicker	19,540	30.63	New
Margin of victory		3,555	5.57	
Turnout		63,795	78.25	
Registered electors		84,925		
DMK win (new seat)				

=== 1952 ===
1952 Madras Legislative Assembly election: Vilathikulam
Party	Candidate	Votes	%	±%
INC	P. Selvaraj	18,819	50.44	New
Independent	Sankaralingam	18,494	49.56	New
Margin of victory		325	0.87	
Turnout		37,313	58.57	
Registered electors		63,707		
INC win (new seat)				
