= K. Ravisankar =

Indian politician

K. Ravishankar was an Indian politician and former Member of the Legislative Assembly. He was elected to the Tamil Nadu legislative assembly as a Dravida Munnetra Kazhagam candidate from Vilathikulam constituency in 1996 election.

Then he joined ADMK and now he is in jail on a theft case.
