= R. Radhakrishnan (politician, born 1971) =

Indian politician (born 1971)

Member of Parliament, Lok Sabha
- In office 16 May 2014 – 23 May 2019
- Succeeded by: V. Vaithilingam
- Constituency: Puducherry

Speaker of Puducherry Legislative Assembly
- In office 2006–2011

Member of Puducherry Legislative Assembly
- In office 2001–2011

Personal details
- Born: 9 June 1971 (age 55) Poudouthottame, Kancheepuram, (Tamil Nadu)
- Party: All India NR Congress
- Other political affiliations: Indian National Congress
- Spouse: R Subhashini
- Children: 2
- Relatives: R. Senthilkumar

Ramanathan Radhakrishnan (born 9 June 1971) is an Indian member of parliament (MP) and former speaker of the Union Territory of Puducherry assembly from 2006 to 2011. He is a member of the All India N R Congress (AINRC) and represents Puducherry constituency in the Lok Sabha from 2014 to 2019.

== Family and education ==
R. Radhakrishnan hails from a family with political lineage. He is the elder son of politician R. Ramanathan (former member of Puducherry legislative assembly).

R. Radhakrishnan completed his High school at ARLM Matriculation school, Cuddalore & Higher secondary Education at Campion Anglo-Indian Higher Secondary school. Under graduation in Commerce from Vivekananda College, Chennai. He completed his post-graduation in Master of Business Administration (MBA) from PSG Institute of Management in Coimbatore, which counts him as one of its distinguished alumni.

== Political career ==
R Radhakrishnan was elected member of Puducherry Assembly twice following his election from the erstwhile Kuruvinatham constituency in 2001 and successively in 2006.

R Radhakrishnan was the Chairman of Puducherry Slum clearance Board from 2001–2006. He served as speaker of the Puducherry assembly from 2006 until 2011.

R Radhakrishnan was candidate for All India NR Congress (AINRC) from Puducherry in the Indian general election. He won with a margin of 60,854 defeating union minister of state V Narayanasamy of Indian National Congress in the 2014 Indian election.
