= S. Kumara Kurubara Ramanathan =

Indian politician

S. Kumara Kurubara Ramanathan was an Indian politician and former Member of the Legislative Assembly. He was elected to the Tamil Nadu legislative assembly as a Dravida Munnetra Kazhagam candidate from Vilathikulam constituency in 1984 election.
