= M. Kandaswamy (Tamil Nadu politician) =

Indian politician

M. Kandaswamy is an Indian politician and former Member of the Legislative Assembly of Tamil Nadu. He was elected to the Tamil Nadu legislative assembly as a Dravida Munnetra Kazhagam candidate from Kulithalai constituency in 1967, and 1971 elections.
