= R. Ramanathan =

Indian politician (c.1948–2019)

Puducherry Legislative Assembly
- In office 1985–1991
- Preceded by: M. A. Shanmugam
- Succeeded by: T. Thiagarajan
- Constituency: Kuruvinatham

Personal details
- Born: c. 1948
- Died: 3 December 2019 (aged 71)
- Party: Dravida Munnetra Kazhagam
- Relatives: R. Radhakrishnan, R. Senthilkumar (sons)

R. Ramanathan (c. 1948 – 3 December 2019) was an Indian politician from Puducherry belonging to Dravida Munnetra Kazhagam. He was elected twice as a legislator of the Puducherry Legislative Assembly.

== Biography ==
Ramanathan was elected as a legislator of the Puducherry Legislative Assembly from Kuruvinatham in 1985. He was also elected from this constituency in 1990. He is the father of R. Radhakrishnan who was a legislator of the Puducherry Legislative Assembly and MP of Lok Sabha.

Ramanathan died of cardiac arrest on 3 December 2019 at the age of 71.
