= Kulithalai Assembly constituency =

One of the 234 State Legislative Assembly Constituencies in Tamil Nadu, in India

Coordinates: 10.56°N 78.25°E

Kulithalai
- Constituency No. 137 for the Tamil Nadu Legislative Assembly

Constituency details
- Country: India
- Region: South India
- State: Tamil Nadu
- District: Karur
- Lok Sabha constituency: Perambalur
- Established: 1957
- Total electors: 2,23,376
- Reservation: None

Member of Legislative Assembly
- 17th Tamil Nadu Legislative Assembly
- Incumbent Suriyanur A. Chandran
- Party: DMK
- Elected year: 2026

Kulithalai is a state assembly constituency in Karur district in the state of Tamil Nadu, India. Its State Assembly Constituency number is 137. It consists of portions of the Kulithalai taluks. It is included in Perambalur Lok Sabha constituency. Former chief minister Karunanidhi represented this.

== Demographics ==
Gender demographic of Kulithalai as of 09.11.2022, taken post the State General election in 2022.

Year	Female	Male	Transgender	Total
2023	110,311	115,918	7	226,236

== Members of Legislative Assembly ==
Year	Member	Political party
Madras State
1957	M. Karunanidhi	Dravida Munnetra Kazhagam
1962	V. Ramanathan	Indian National Congress
1967	M. Kandaswamy	Dravida Munnetra Kazhagam
Tamil Nadu
1971	M. Kandasamy	Dravida Munnetra Kazhagam
1977	P. E. Srinivasa Reddiar	Indian National Congress
1980	R. Karuppiah	Communist Party of India
1984	P. Musiri Puppnan	All India Anna Dravida Munnetra Kazhagam
1989	A. Pappa Sundaram	All India Anna Dravida Munnetra Kazhagam
1991	A. Pappa Sundaram	All India Anna Dravida Munnetra Kazhagam
1996	R. Selvam	Dravida Munnetra Kazhagam
2001	A. Pappa Sundaram	All India Anna Dravida Munnetra Kazhagam
2006	R. Manickam	Dravida Munnetra Kazhagam
2011	A. Pappa Sundaram	All India Anna Dravida Munnetra Kazhagam
2016	E. Ramar	Dravida Munnetra Kazhagam
2021	R. Manickam	Dravida Munnetra Kazhagam
2026	Suriyanur A. Chandran	Dravida Munnetra Kazhagam

== Election results ==
Vote share of winning candidates
2026	32.59%
2021	51.37%
2016	48.85%
2011	54.78%
2006	50.42%
2001	52.78%
1996	49.19%
1991	69.83%
1989	43.02%
1984	64.05%
1980	52.96%
1977	33.59%
1971	53.68%
1967	49.68%
1962	64.04%
1957	47.32%

=== 2026 ===
2026 Tamil Nadu Legislative Assembly election: Kulithalai
Party	Candidate	Votes	%	±%
DMK	Suriyanur A. Chandran	68,138	32.59	▼18.78
TVK	G. Balasubramani	67,559	32.31	New
AIADMK	S.Karunakaran	60,317	28.85	▼10.53
NTK	Selva.Nanmaaran	7,978	3.82	▼2.05
NOTA	NOTA	612	0.29	▼0.32
Independent	S.Senthilkumar	607	0.29	New
Independent	V.Chinnasamy	488	0.23	New
Independent	P.Selvakumar	452	0.22	New
Independent	D.Saravanan	381	0.18	New
Ganasangam Party of India	P.Murugan	330	0.16	New
Independent	K.Sheikanwardeen	302	0.14	New
Independent	T.Selvaraj	217	0.10	New
Independent	J.Santhosh Kumar	206	0.10	New
Independent	K.Hakkim	182	0.09	New
Independent	B.Sampathkumar	162	0.08	New
Independent	Chandrasekar.P	133	0.06	New
Independent	M.Vadivelan	117	0.06	New
Independent	M.Arunkumar	113	0.05	New
Independent	O.Kathalingam	95	0.05	New
Independent	M.Gayathiri	84	0.04	New
Independent	B.Kajahmohideen	83	0.04	New
Independent	T.Muruganantham	82	0.04	New
Independent	K.Veeramalai	79	0.04	New
Independent	S.Imrankhan	68	0.03	New
Independent	M.Tamilselvan	67	0.03	New
Independent	N.Ramakrishnan	63	0.03	New
Independent	R.Arunkumar	53	0.03	New
Independent	M.Mayilvaganan	46	0.02	New
Independent	J.Madhavan	41	0.02	New
Independent	J.Pradhap	36	0.02	New
Margin of victory		579	0.28	▼11.71
Turnout		2,09,091	93.60	▲7.17
Registered electors		2,23,376		▼3,692
DMK hold		Swing	▼18.78	

=== 2021 ===
2021 Tamil Nadu Legislative Assembly election: Kulithalai
Party	Candidate	Votes	%	±%
DMK	R. Manickam	100,829	51.37%	▲2.52
AIADMK	N. R. Chandrasekar	77,289	39.38%	▼3.01
NTK	Seeni Prakasu	11,511	5.87%	▲4.97
NOTA	Nota	1,191	0.61%	▼0.43
Independent	R. Saravanan	838	0.43%	New
AMMK	V. Nirosha	761	0.39%	New
Independent	R. Chandrasekar	694	0.35%	New
IJK	S. Manikandan	674	0.34%	New
Independent	V. Vellaiyan	612	0.31%	New
BSP	P. Anbalagan	590	0.30%	▼0.22
Independent	K. Suresh	494	0.25%	New
Margin of victory		23,540	11.99%	5.53%
Turnout		196,265	86.43%	−1.69%
Rejected ballots		165	0.08%	
Registered electors		227,068		
DMK hold		Swing	2.52%	

=== 2016 ===
2016 Tamil Nadu Legislative Assembly election: Kulithalai
Party	Candidate	Votes	%	±%
DMK	E. Ramar	89,923	48.85%	▲8.15
AIADMK	R. Chandrasekaran	78,027	42.39%	▼12.39
DMDK	Jamuna Thangavel	6,726	3.65%	New
NOTA	None Of The Above	1,906	1.04%	New
NTK	Seeni Prakasu	1,643	0.89%	New
BJP	N. K. N. Shathakathulla	1,437	0.78%	▼0.6
Independent	T. Chandrasekaran	1,031	0.56%	New
BSP	V. Maruthaiveeran	950	0.52%	New
PMK	S. Balasubramani	870	0.47%	New
Independent	M. Jeganathan	554	0.30%	New
Independent	R. Selvam	449	0.24%	New
Margin of victory		11,896	6.46%	−7.61%
Turnout		184,076	88.13%	−0.67%
Registered electors		208,870		
DMK gain from AIADMK		Swing	-5.93%	

=== 2011 ===
2011 Tamil Nadu Legislative Assembly election: Kulithalai
Party	Candidate	Votes	%	±%
AIADMK	A. Pappa Sundaram	87,459	54.78%	▲14.49
DMK	R. Manickam	64,986	40.70%	▼9.72
BJP	A. Dhanasekaran	2,200	1.38%	▼0.08
Independent	K. V. Chinnasami	1,670	1.05%	New
IJK	R. Prakashkanna	1,344	0.84%	New
PPIS (Tamil Nadu)	M. Selvam	1,164	0.73%	New
Independent	S. Kandasamy	839	0.53%	New
Margin of victory		22,473	14.08%	3.94%
Turnout		179,805	88.80%	8.31%
Registered electors		159,662		
AIADMK gain from DMK		Swing	4.36%	

=== 2006 ===
2006 Tamil Nadu Legislative Assembly election: Kulithalai
Party	Candidate	Votes	%	±%
DMK	R. Manickam	69,615	50.42%	▲10.96
AIADMK	A. Pappa Sundaram	55,626	40.29%	▼12.49
DMDK	M. Viswanathan	4,790	3.47%	New
BJP	N. C. Raju	2,010	1.46%	New
Independent	P. Mahendran	1,338	0.97%	New
Independent	N. Nagarajan	1,026	0.74%	New
BSP	K. Kadirvelu	1,006	0.73%	New
Independent	R. Boopathi	900	0.65%	New
SP	M. Munusamy	700	0.51%	New
Independent	V. Chinnasami	357	0.26%	New
Independent	R. Kothai	355	0.26%	New
Margin of victory		13,989	10.13%	−3.19%
Turnout		138,070	80.49%	10.57%
Registered electors		171,539		
DMK gain from AIADMK		Swing	-2.36%	

=== 2001 ===
2001 Tamil Nadu Legislative Assembly election: Kulithalai
Party	Candidate	Votes	%	±%
AIADMK	A. Pappa Sundaram	66,406	52.78%	▲18.02
DMK	D. Thirunavukkarasu	49,640	39.46%	▼9.73
MDMK	M. R. Pugalendhe	5,492	4.37%	▼4.86
Independent	P. Ramasamy	2,292	1.82%	New
Independent	M. Selvam	1,077	0.86%	New
Independent	S. Raju	903	0.72%	New
Margin of victory		16,766	13.33%	−1.10%
Turnout		125,810	69.92%	−4.79%
Registered electors		179,980		
AIADMK gain from DMK		Swing	3.60%	

=== 1996 ===
1996 Tamil Nadu Legislative Assembly election: Kulithalai
Party	Candidate	Votes	%	±%
DMK	R. Selvam	60,521	49.19%	▲20.42
AIADMK	A. Pappa Sundaram	42,771	34.76%	▼35.07
MDMK	R. Pugalendhi	11,356	9.23%	New
Independent	P. Kaliappan	5,132	4.17%	New
Independent	E. Dravida Mani	995	0.81%	New
JP	L. Srirenga Reddiar	578	0.47%	New
Independent	A. P. Erajalingam	539	0.44%	New
Independent	N. Karuppaian	293	0.24%	New
Independent	A. Thangavelu	227	0.18%	New
Independent	J. Anbumozhi	165	0.13%	New
Independent	M. J. Selvanathan	143	0.12%	New
Margin of victory		17,750	14.43%	−26.64%
Turnout		123,046	74.72%	3.17%
Registered electors		173,318		
DMK gain from AIADMK		Swing	-20.65%	

=== 1991 ===
1991 Tamil Nadu Legislative Assembly election: Kulithalai
Party	Candidate	Votes	%	±%
AIADMK	A. Pappa Sundaram	80,499	69.83%	▲26.81
DMK	S. P. Sethiraman	33,158	28.76%	▼3.94
Independent	M. Dharamaraju	341	0.30%	New
Independent	V. Vellusamy	302	0.26%	New
PMK	P. Somasundaram	299	0.26%	New
Independent	M. Vellaisamy	156	0.14%	New
Independent	M. Mohan	142	0.12%	New
THMM	S. R. Kannadasan	137	0.12%	New
Independent	K. R. Ramasamy	108	0.09%	New
Independent	S. K. Manoharan	67	0.06%	New
Independent	P. Ponnambalam	66	0.06%	New
Margin of victory		47,341	41.07%	30.75%
Turnout		115,275	71.55%	−7.39%
Registered electors		165,240		
AIADMK hold		Swing	26.81%	

=== 1989 ===
1989 Tamil Nadu Legislative Assembly election: Kulithalai
Party	Candidate	Votes	%	±%
AIADMK	A. Pappa Sundaram	49,231	43.02%	▼21.03
DMK	A. Sivaraman	37,421	32.70%	New
Independent	R. Karuppaiah	17,551	15.34%	New
AIADMK	N. Nallusamy	8,814	7.70%	▼56.35
Independent	R. Sekar	630	0.55%	New
Independent	N. Thiagarajan	397	0.35%	New
Independent	T. Muthusamy Poojari	206	0.18%	New
Independent	S. Arockiam	179	0.16%	New
Margin of victory		11,810	10.32%	−20.43%
Turnout		114,429	78.94%	−0.35%
Registered electors		147,731		
AIADMK hold		Swing	-21.03%	

=== 1984 ===
1984 Tamil Nadu Legislative Assembly election: Kulithalai
Party	Candidate	Votes	%	±%
AIADMK	P. Musiri Puppnan	62,165	64.05%	New
CPI	B. Karuppaiah	32,317	33.30%	▼19.66
Independent	P. Dearmaraj	1,748	1.80%	New
Independent	P. Rajalingam	500	0.52%	New
Independent	R. Annavi	321	0.33%	New
Margin of victory		29,848	30.75%	21.01%
Turnout		97,051	79.29%	8.63%
Registered electors		130,379		
AIADMK gain from CPI		Swing	11.09%	

=== 1980 ===
1980 Tamil Nadu Legislative Assembly election: Kulithalai
Party	Candidate	Votes	%	±%
CPI	R. Karuppaiah	44,525	52.96%	New
INC	P. E. Srinivasa Reddiar	36,336	43.22%	▲9.63
Independent	C. Periasamy	2,737	3.26%	New
Independent	T. Muthusamy Poosari	474	0.56%	New
Margin of victory		8,189	9.74%	0.24%
Turnout		84,072	70.66%	2.56%
Registered electors		120,320		
CPI gain from INC		Swing	19.37%	

=== 1977 ===
1977 Tamil Nadu Legislative Assembly election: Kulithalai
Party	Candidate	Votes	%	±%
INC	P. E. Srinivasa Reddiar	27,043	33.59%	▼12.73
AIADMK	S. Rasu	19,396	24.09%	New
DMK	K. V. Muthusamy	18,581	23.08%	▼30.59
JP	C. John Britto	14,642	18.19%	New
Independent	M. S. Royappan	843	1.05%	New
Margin of victory		7,647	9.50%	2.15%
Turnout		80,505	68.09%	−10.09%
Registered electors		119,673		
INC gain from DMK		Swing	-20.08%	

=== 1971 ===
1971 Tamil Nadu Legislative Assembly election: Kulithalai
Party	Candidate	Votes	%	±%
DMK	M. Kandaswamy	44,198	53.68%	▲4
INC	P. E. Srinivasan Reddiar	38,145	46.32%	▲1.89
Margin of victory		6,053	7.35%	2.10%
Turnout		82,343	78.18%	−1.67%
Registered electors		107,450		
DMK hold		Swing	4.00%	

=== 1967 ===
1967 Madras Legislative Assembly election: Kulithalai
Party	Candidate	Votes	%	±%
DMK	M. Kandaswamy	36,120	49.68%	▲13.72
INC	P. E. S. Reddiar	32,305	44.43%	▼19.61
CPI	R. Karuppaiah	3,949	5.43%	New
Independent	Pillai	336	0.46%	New
Margin of victory		3,815	5.25%	−22.84%
Turnout		72,710	79.85%	4.23%
Registered electors		96,359		
DMK gain from INC		Swing	-14.37%	

=== 1962 ===
1962 Madras Legislative Assembly election: Kulithalai
Party	Candidate	Votes	%	±%
INC	V. Ramanathan	47,243	64.04%	▲33.95
DMK	N. Rathanam	26,525	35.96%	New
Margin of victory		20,718	28.09%	10.86%
Turnout		73,768	75.63%	21.88%
Registered electors		101,216		
INC gain from Independent		Swing	16.72%	

=== 1957 ===
1957 Madras Legislative Assembly election: Kulithalai
Party	Candidate	Votes	%	±%
Independent	M. Karunanidhi	22,785	47.32%	New
INC	K. A. Dharmalingam	14,489	30.09%	New
Independent	R. Venkatarama Naidu	3,784	7.86%	New
Independent	S. Shanmugham	3,726	7.74%	New
Independent	R. Govindan	1,866	3.88%	New
Independent	R. Rajagopala Iyengar	759	1.58%	New
Independent	K. P. Veerappan	740	1.54%	New
Margin of victory		8,296	17.23%	
Turnout		48,149	53.75%	
Registered electors		89,574		
Independent win (new seat)				
