= A. Pappa Sundaram =

Indian politician (died 2021)

Member of the Tamil Nadu Legislative Assembly
- In office 13 May 2011 – 19 May 2016
- Constituency: Kulithalai
- In office 13 May 2001 – 11 May 2006
- Constituency: Kulithalai
- In office 6 February 1989 – 12 May 1996
- Constituency: Kulithalai

Personal details
- Born: 1931/1932
- Died: 18 April 2021 (aged 89)

A. Pappa Sundaram (1931/1932 – 18 April 2021) was an Indian politician.

He served as a member of the Tamil Nadu Legislative Assembly from Kulithalai. Previously, he was elected as an Anna Dravida Munnetra Kazhagam (Jayalalitha) candidate in 1989 election, and as an Anna Dravida Munnetra Kazhagam candidate in the 1991, 2001 and 2011 elections.

Sundaram died from lung congestion and COVID-19 at age 89 on 18 April 2021 during the COVID-19 pandemic in India.
