= P. G. Anoor Jegadeesan =

Indian politician

P. G. Anoor Jegadeesan was an India politician and three times Member of Legislative Assembly. He was elected from Chengalpattu constituency in 1977, 1980 and 1984 elections as an Anna Dravida Munnetra Kazhagam candidate.

== Electoral performance ==
Election	Constituency	Political party	Result	Vote %	Opposition			Ref
Election	Constituency	Political party	Result	Vote %	Candidate	Political party	Vote %	Ref
1977	Chengalpattu	AIADMK	Won	43.50%	V. Rudrakotti	DMK	37.75%	
1980	Chengalpattu	AIADMK	Won	53.07%	K. Natarajan	INC	46.32%	
1984	Chengalpattu	AIADMK	Won	50.14%	V. Rudrakotti	DMK	48.80%	
