= P. Chinnappan =

Indian politician

P. Chinnappan is an Indian politician and a presently serving Member of the Legislative Assembly. He was elected to the Tamil Nadu legislative assembly as an Anna Dravida Munnetra Kazhagam candidate from Vilathikulam constituency in 2006 election. and he has also been selected once again as the member of legislative assembly from vilathikulam during 2019 byelection.according to the election results released on 23 rd of May, he secured 70002 votes which is 28,600 votes more than the 2nd place.
