= M. Varalakshmi =

Indian politician (born 1974)

Member of Tamil Nadu Legislative Assembly
- In office 21 May 2016 – 06 May 2026
- Constituency: Chengalpattu constituency

Personal details
- Born: 16 April 1974 (age 52)
- Party: Dravida Munnetra Kazhagam
- Spouse: Madhusudhanan P
- Children: 1 Son & 1 Daughter
- Education: College of Nursing, Chengalpattu Medical College

M. Varalakshmi (born 16 April 1974) is an Indian politician and member of the Tamil Nadu Legislative Assembly. She was elected as the representative of the Chengalpattu constituency in the 2016 Tamil Nadu Legislative Assembly election as a member of the Dravida Munnetra Kazhagam.

== Personal life ==
Varalakshmi is a resident of Appur village in the Kanchipuram district of Tamil Nadu and a diploma graduate of the Kanchipuram Government College of Nursing.

== Political career ==
Varalakshmi was the representative as the head of the Appur Panchayat between 2006 and 2016.

In the 2016 Tamil Nadu Legislative Assembly election, she was nominated to contest as the candidate of the Dravida Munnetra Kazhagam from the Chengalpattu state assembly constituency in the Kanchipuram district. Her primary opponent in the election was R. Kamalakkannan who was the candidate of the All India Anna Dravida Munnetra Kazhagam. The election resulted in Varalakshmi emerging as the winning candidate with a margin of over 27,000 votes and polling at 45.11% of the votes cast against 34.58% of the votes cast in favor of Kamalakkannan.

== Electoral performance ==
Election	Constituency	Political party	Result	Vote %	Opposition			Ref
Election	Constituency	Political party	Result	Vote %	Candidate	Political party	Vote %	Ref
2016	Chengalpattu	DMK	Won	45.11%	R. Kamalakkannan	AIADMK	34.58%	
2021	Chengalpattu	DMK	Won	48.18%	M. Gajendran	AIADMK	38.34%	-
